= Poyntelle, Pennsylvania =

Unincorporated community in Pennsylvania, US

- Village
- Village of Poyntelle
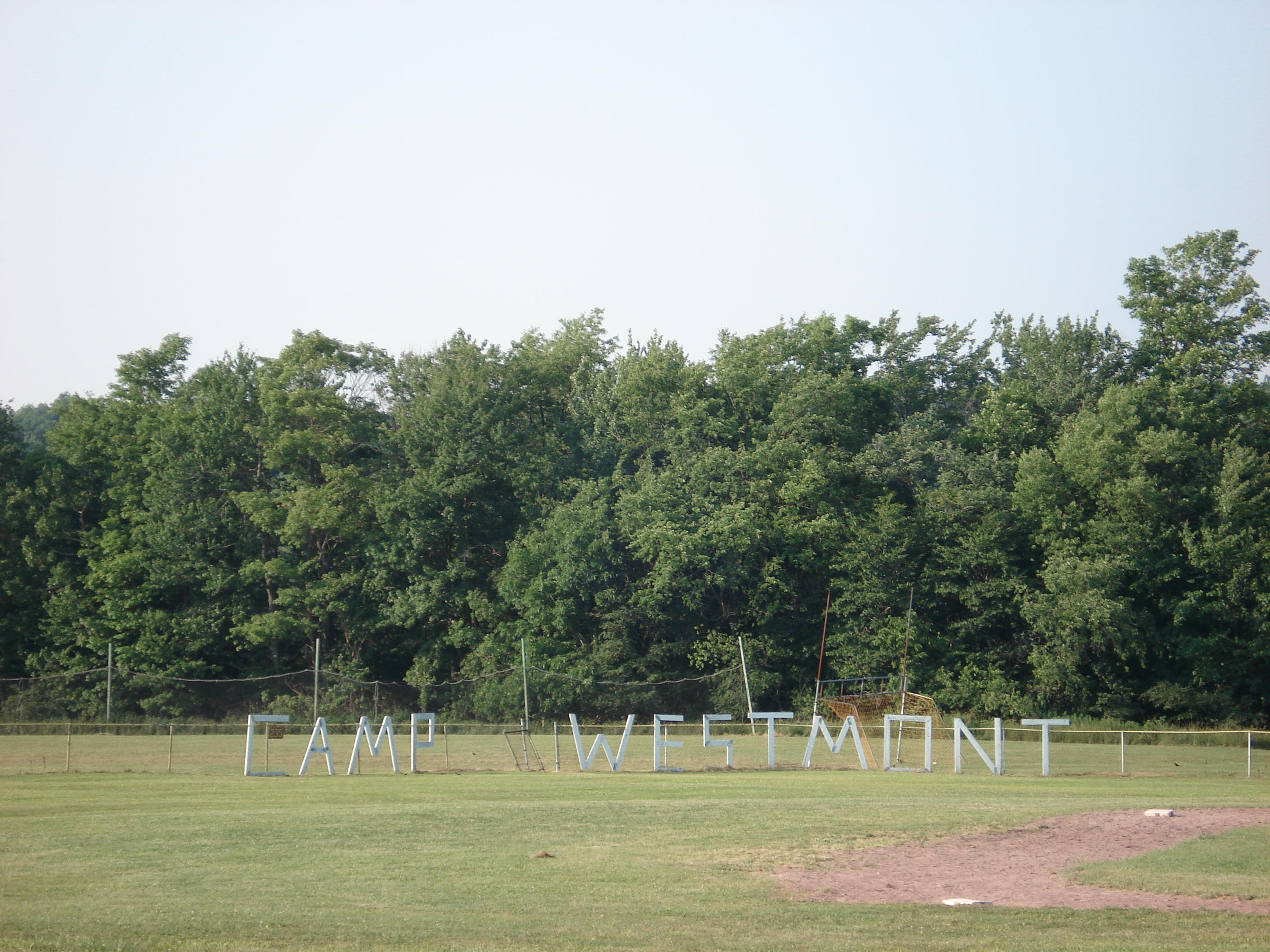
- Camp Westmont in Poyntelle

- Poyntelle's location within Pennsylvania. Poyntelle (the United States)
- Coordinates: 41°49′16″N 75°25′12″W
- Country: United States
- State: Pennsylvania
- U.S. Congressional District: 10
- County: Wayne
- School District: Wayne Highlands; Region I
- Magisterial District: 22-3-04
- Township: Preston
- Named for: William Poyntell I
- Elevation: 2,070 ft (630 m)
- Time zone: UTC-5 (Eastern (EST))
  - Summer (DST): UTC-4 (Eastern Daylight (EDT))
- ZIP codes: De jure 18454 De facto 18454; 18439 (Lakewood); 18453 (Pleasant Mount); 18465 (Thompson)
- Area code: 570
- GNIS feature ID: 1204443
- FIPS code: 42-127-62600-57144
- Waterways: Bone Pond, Equinunk Creek, Independent Lake, Johnson Creek, Lackawanna River (East Branch), Lackawaxen River (West Branch), Lake Lorain, Poyntelle Lake, Riley Creek

Poyntelle (/pɔɪˈnɛl/ poy-NEL) is a village that is located in Preston Township, Wayne County, Pennsylvania, United States, in the Lake Region of the Poconos.

== History ==
This community was once designated as a depot of the Scranton Division of the New York, Ontario & Western (O&W) Railway, but today, when it is referred to outside of its immediate vicinity, it is largely known for being the location of Camps Westmont and Poyntelle, since the reputation and commercial reach of both, like those of most rural American summer camps, extend beyond the community in which the camps are physically located.

== Municipal status and boundaries ==
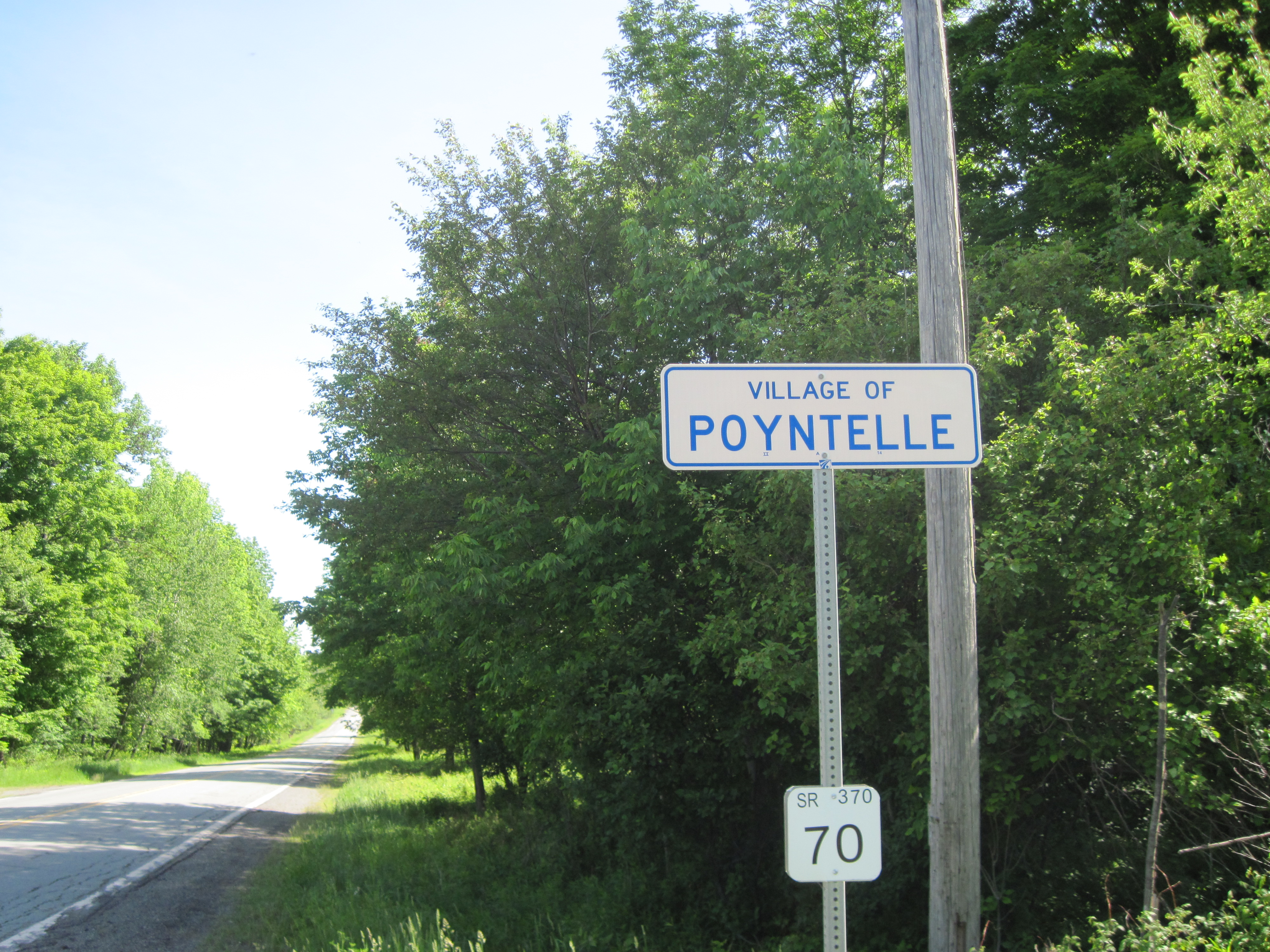
An image of one of Poyntelle's two PennDOT signs, this one facing northeast along Crosstown Highway

Two Pennsylvania Department of Transportation (PennDOT) signs on Crosstown Highway identify the community as the "Village of Poyntelle." In Pennsylvania, a village is an unincorporated community within a township, but PennDOT identifies most villages with roadside signs, a fact that might reasonably lead those unfamiliar with this practice to believe that these communities are incorporated municipalities administered separately from the townships in which they are located. Since Pennsylvania's villages, including Poyntelle, are, in fact, not municipalities in their own right, they do not have official boundaries, and the United States Census Bureau does not collect statistics for them (unless, unlike Poyntelle, they are census-designated places).

In spite of this, because of strong local consensus, as well as the fact that many features are named for the villages they are associated with, it is almost always possible to consistently determine whether a particular feature is in one village or another.

== Natural features ==
Notable natural features located in Poyntelle include Bone Pond (also called Summit Lake), Independent Lake (partially in Orson, Pennsylvania, and formerly known as Independence Pond or Independent Pond, and sometimes known today as Lake Independence or Lake Independent), Lake Lorain (also called Five Mile Pond), and Poyntelle Lake (also called Pointed Pond).

In addition, the Equinunk, Riley, and Johnson Creeks run through Poyntelle, and some of the small, unnamed streams that are the source of the West Branch of the Lackawaxen River begin in the southern part of the village (the rest are in Orson).

Independent Lake, Bone Pond, and Lake Lorain are three of the four sources of the East Branch of the Lackawanna River (the fourth being Dunn Pond, or Dunns Lake, in East Ararat, Pennsylvania). Lake Lorain has the highest elevation of any lake in Wayne County, hence the alternate name "Summit Lake." Poyntelle Lake feeds into the Equinunk. Like most of the lakes in Preston Township, all of Poyntelle's are fed by natural springs on their lake bottoms.

== Roads and intersections ==
Poyntelle is located along Crosstown Highway, which is entirely concurrent with PA-370 (PA-370). Besides Crosstown, there are two other state routes in the village, Cribbs Road (PA-4031), which connects to Crosstown, and South Preston Road (PA-4033). All three of these are paved.

There are also eight township roads in Poyntelle. Three of them are entirely located within the village: Czapnik Road (designated Township Road 571, or T571), which connects to both Cribbs and South Preston; Poyntelle Road (T722), which connects to Crosstown, Cribbs, and South Preston; and Lake Lorain Road (T729; referred to as "Lorain Road" on the United States Geological Survey (USGS) Orson Quadrangle topographic map, which includes Poyntelle), which connects to just Crosstown. The other five cross into other villages: Paluch Road (T567; the USGS map says "Poluch Road"), which connects to Cribbs; Clark Road (T579), which connects to Crosstown; Dix Road (T594; referred to as "North Road" on the PennDOT General Highway Map for Wayne County), which connects to Paluch; Spruce Lake Road (T688), which connects to Crosstown and Clark; and O & W Road (T727; the USGS map says "Old State Road"), which connects to Cribbs and Poyntelle. Like many township roads in the state, Paluch, Czapnik, Clark, Dix, Spruce Lake, Poyntelle, O & W, and Lake Lorain are all unpaved.

Finally, there are seven officially-named (i.e., their names may be used in addresses) private roads in the community, all of which fall entirely within its boundaries. They are Bone Pond Lane, which connects to just Crosstown; Forest Road; Hemlock Lane, which connects to just Crosstown; Lake Drive, which connects to Forest; Lakehill Road, which connects to Clark, Forest, and Lake; Lakeside Drive, which connects to Spruce Lake, Forest, and Lake; and Spruce Road, which does not connect to any of the others. All of these are unpaved.
