= Orson, Pennsylvania =

Unincorporated community in Pennsylvania, US

- Village
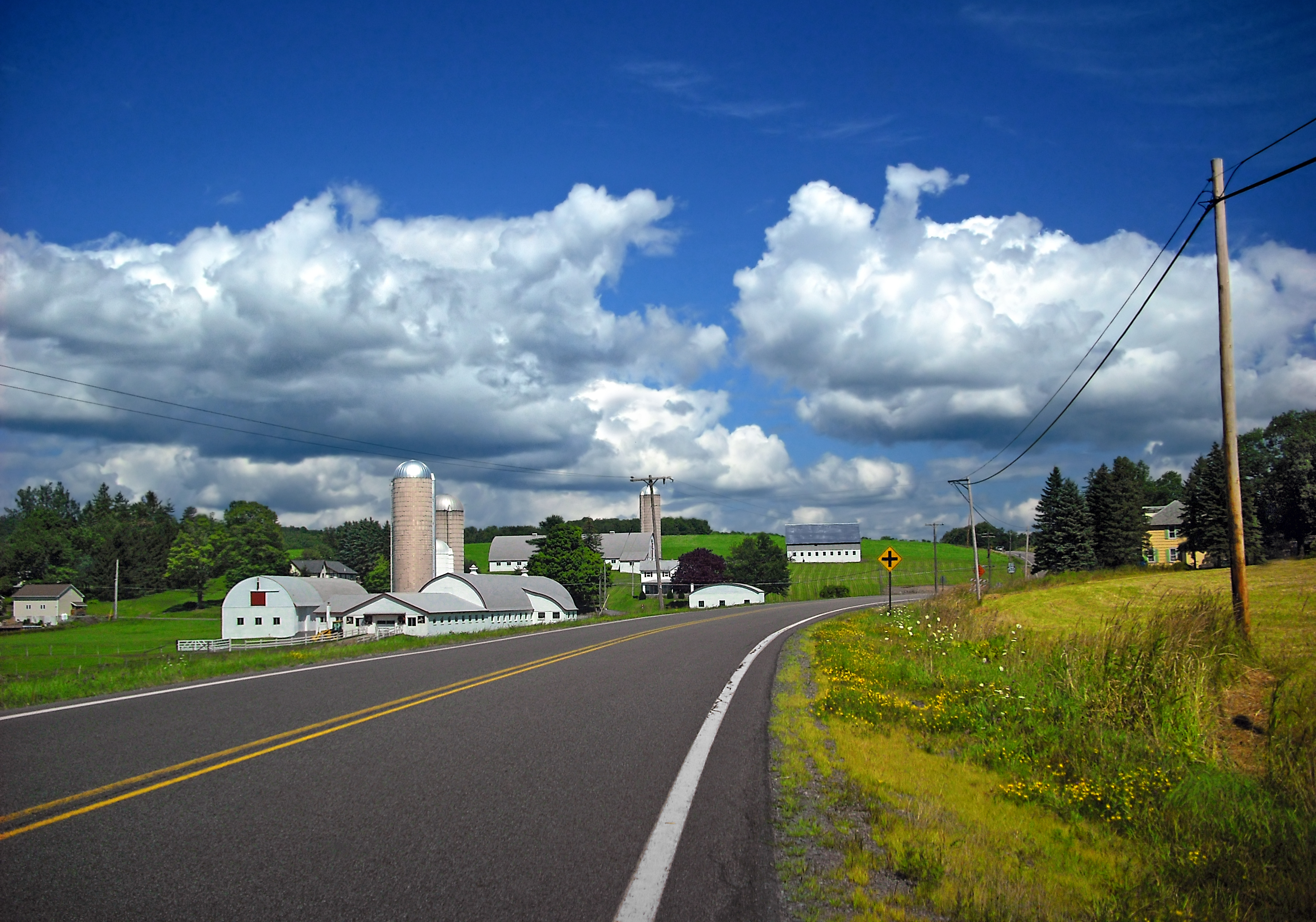
- Orson as seen from Crosstown Highway, facing east.
- Nicknames: Hine's Corners (historical), Orson Corners (rarely used)
- Orson's Location within Pennsylvania.
- Coordinates: 41°48′49.302″N 75°26′52.6518″W
- Country: United States
- State: Pennsylvania
- U.S. Congressional District: PA-10
- School District: Wayne Highlands; Region I
- County: Wayne
- Magisterial District: 22-3-04
- Township: Preston
- Settled: 1831 or 1840
- Founder: Merritt Hine
- Named for: Orson C. Chamberlain
- Elevation: 1,998 ft (609 m)
- Time zone: UTC-5 (Eastern (EST))
  - Summer (DST): UTC-4 (Eastern Daylight (EDT))
- ZIP codes: De jure 18449 De facto 18439 (Lakewood); 18465 (Thompson); 18470 (Union Dale)
- Area code: 570
- GNIS feature ID: 1183050
- FIPS code: 42-127-62600-57144
- Waterways: Independent Lake, Lackawanna River (East Branch), Lackawaxen River (West Branch), Mud Pond, Orson Pond

Orson is a village in Preston Township, Pennsylvania, United States, situated in the Lake Region of the Poconos. It was once an important depot of the Scranton Division of the New York, Ontario & Western (O&W) Railway, but today is best known for being the site of the intersection of two state roads, Belmont Turnpike (partially concurrent with Pennsylvania Route 670, or PA-670) and Crosstown Highway (entirely concurrent with PA-370), or as the location of Independent Lake Camp (ILC).

== Municipal status and boundaries ==
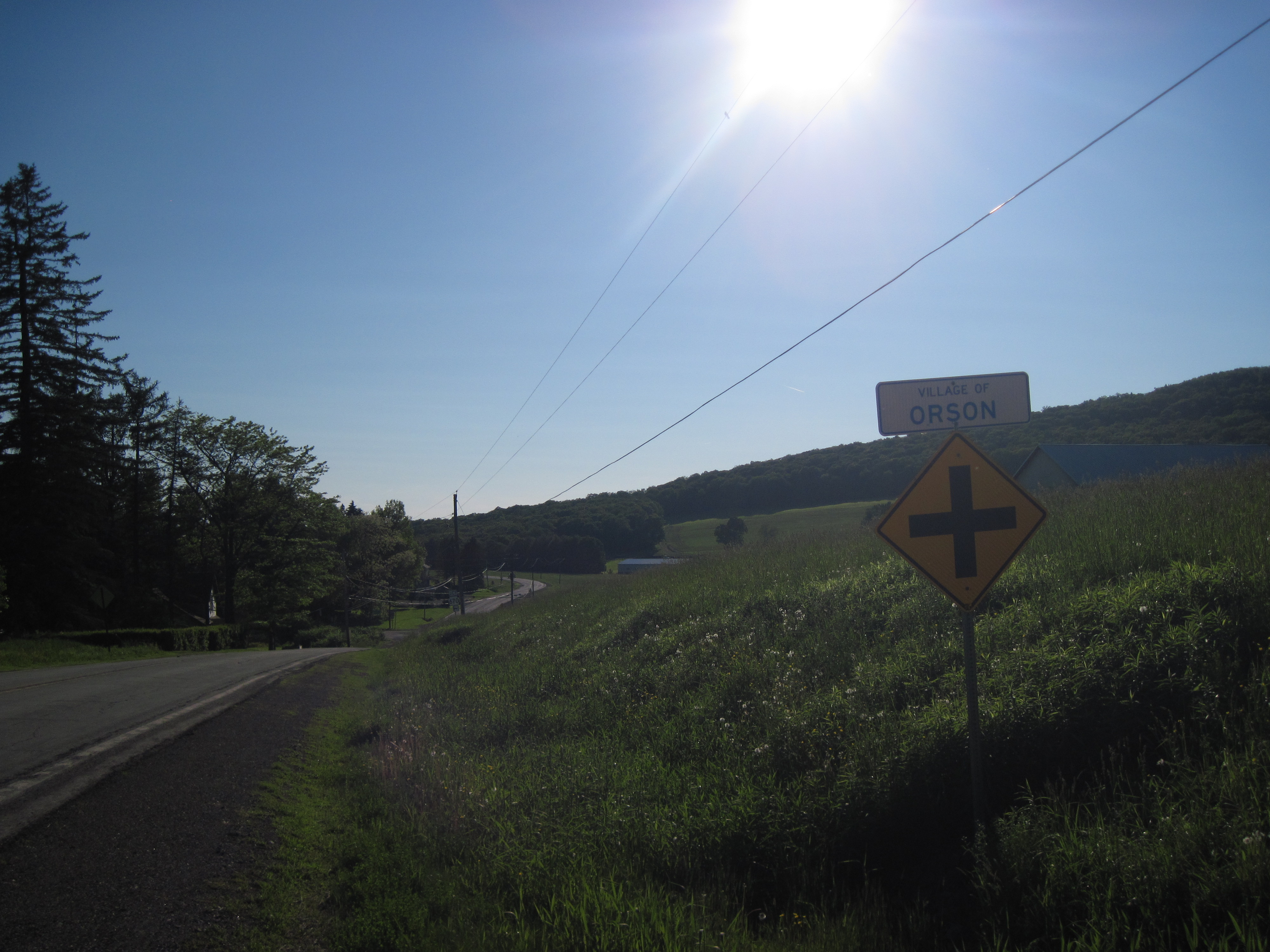
One of Orson's PennDOT signs, located on Crosstown Highway to the east of the intersection with Belmont Turnpike.

Two Pennsylvania Department of Transportation (PennDOT) signs on Crosstown Highway identify the community as the "Village of Orson." In Pennsylvania, a village is an unincorporated community within a township, but PennDOT identifies most villages with roadside signs, a fact that might reasonably lead those unfamiliar with this practice to believe that these communities are incorporated municipalities administered separately from the townships in which they are located. Since Pennsylvania's villages, including Orson, are, in fact, not municipalities in their own right, they do not have official boundaries, and the United States Census Bureau does not collect statistics for them (unless, unlike Orson, they are census-designated places). In spite of this, because of strong local consensus, as well as the fact that many features are named for the villages they are associated with, it is almost always possible to consistently determine whether a particular feature is in one village or another.

== Natural features ==
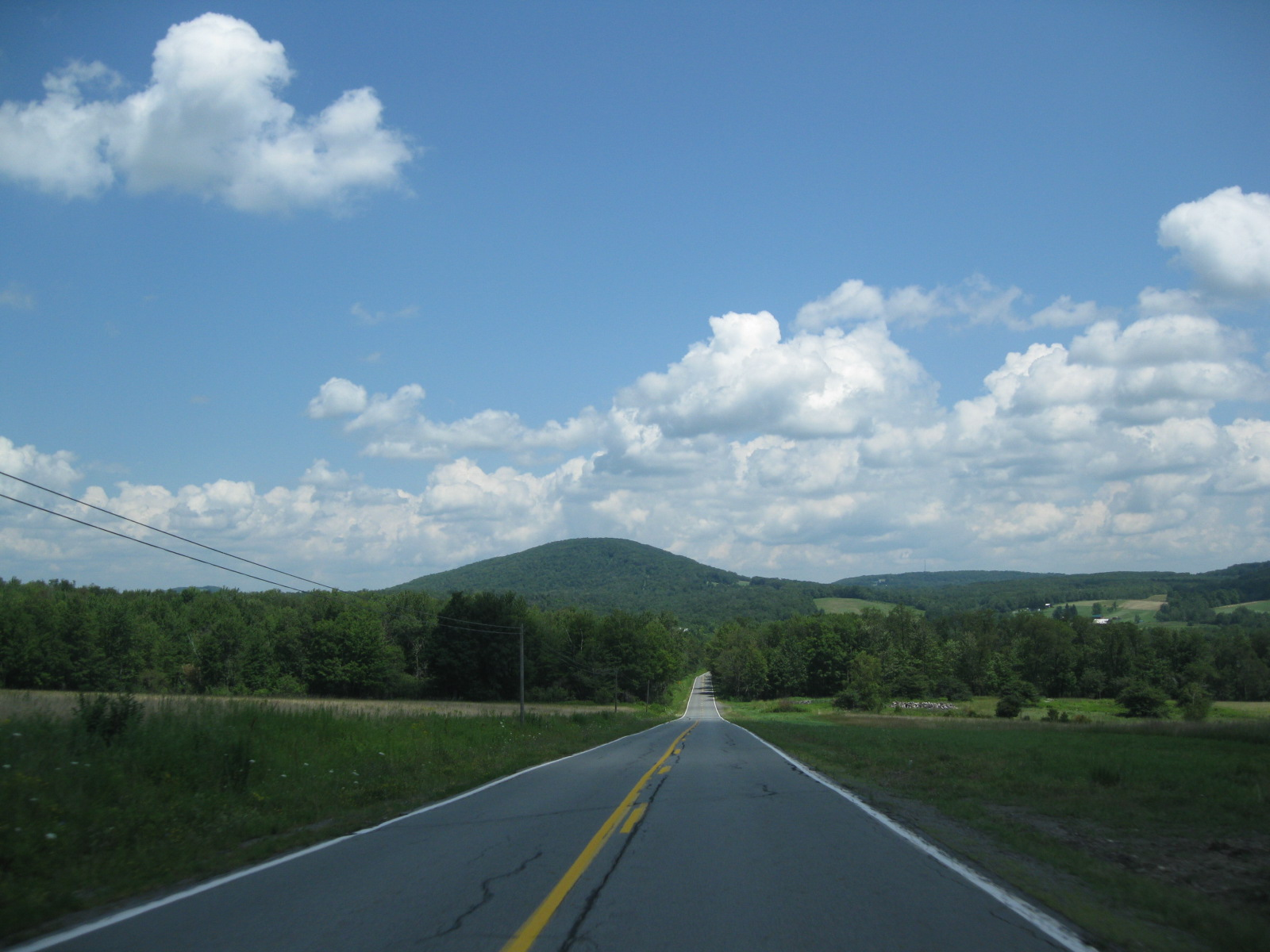
Sugarloaf Mountain, center-left, as seen from East Ararat on Crosstown Highway between Orson and PA-171, facing northeast. The NEP cell tower and a few buildings that are part of ILC can also be seen in the distance, center-right.

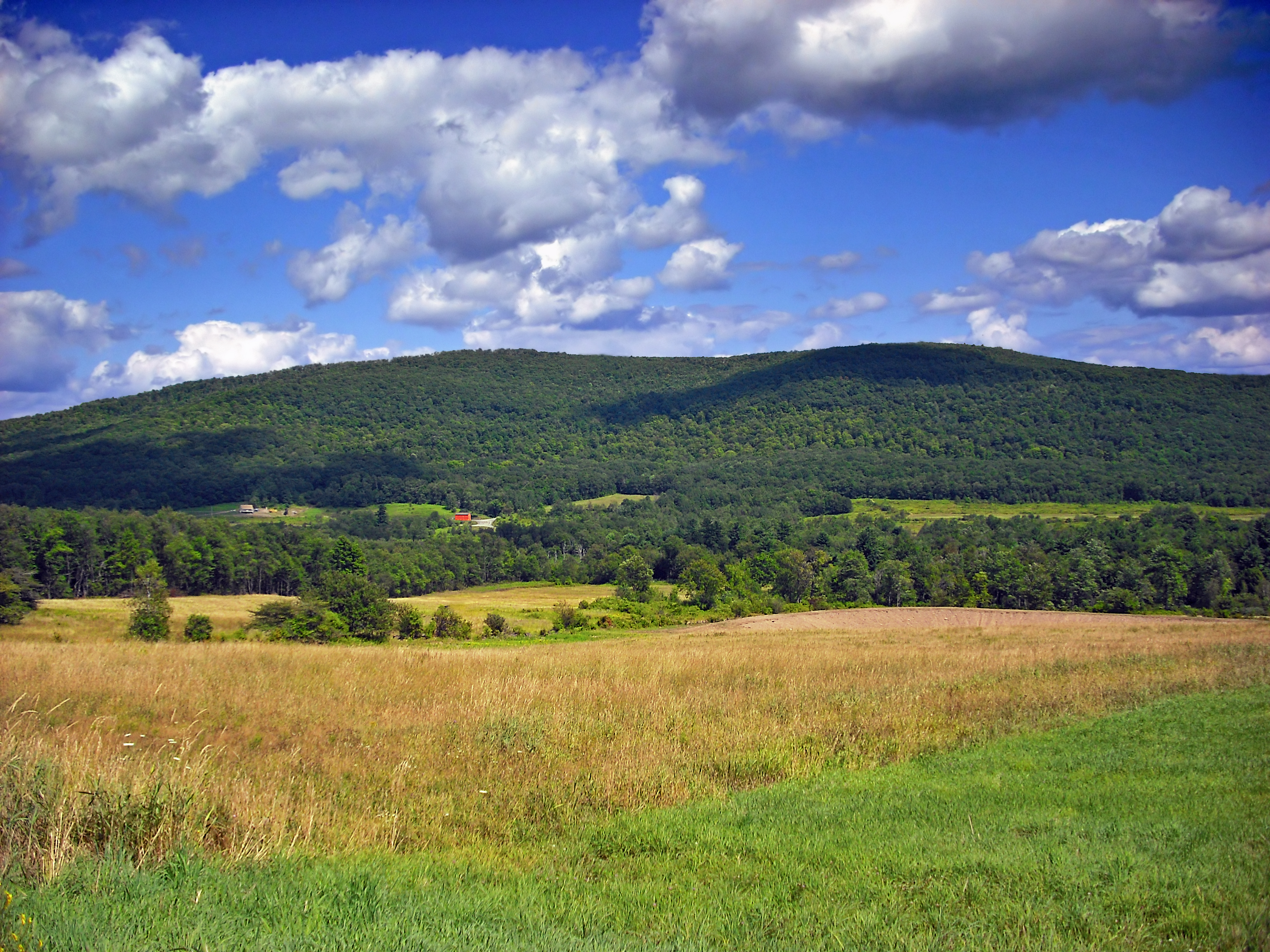
Mount Ararat, as seen from approximately the same spot, but facing southeast.

Notable natural features located in Orson include Mount Ararat (partially in Belmont Corners, Pennsylvania, and sometimes called Ararat Mountain, Ararat Peak, Ararat Summit, or simply "Ararat"), Independent Lake (partially in Poyntelle, Pennsylvania, and formerly known as Independence Pond or Independent Pond, and sometimes known today as Lake Independence or Lake Independent), Mud Pond (partially in East Ararat, Pennsylvania), Orson Pond, and Sugarloaf Mountain (formerly called Sugar Loaf Peak or Sugar-loaf Mountain). In addition, some of the small, unnamed streams that are the source of the West Branch of the Lackawaxen River begin in the southern part of the village (the rest are in Poyntelle).

Independent Lake is one of the four sources of the East Branch of the Lackawanna River (the other three being Bone Pond, or Summit Lake, and Lake Lorain, or Five Mile Pond, in Poyntelle; and Dunn Pond, or Dunns Lake, in East Ararat). It is fed by natural springs on the lake bottom. Orson Pond, a reservoir once used for ice harvesting and other economic activities, was originally a much smaller body of water, but was expanded significantly when the Orson Pond Dam, or Orson Dam, (which is of the rock-fill variety) was built. The pond drains into the Lackawanna.

== Roads and intersections ==
As has been noted above, Orson is centered around the intersection of Belmont Turnpike and Crosstown Highway. This intersection is the northern terminus of both Belmont and PA-670 (which are concurrent there), and the paved road that runs north from the junction is called Oxbow Road (at least one source says "Orson" Road). Oxbow is designated PA-4035, and is part of neither PA-670 nor Belmont.

Township roads in Orson include Blewett Road (Township Road 678, or T678), which connects to Crosstown; Clark Road (T579), which connects to Crosstown and Oxbow; Doyle Road (T686), which connects to Crosstown and Clark; Hines Road (T692), which connects to just Clark; Mud Pond Road (T565), which connects to just Crosstown; and Paluch Road (T567), which connects to Belmont. In Pennsylvania, township roads are numbered by county (i.e., a single number may be assigned to multiple roads as long as each road is in a different county), but are maintained by township (i.e., the township is entirely responsible for their upkeep). Like many township roads in the state, Blewett, Clark, Doyle, Hines, Mud Pond, and Paluch are all unpaved. There is also one officially named (i.e., its name may be used in addresses) private road in the village, Black Bear Lane, which connects to Crosstown and is also unpaved.

== History ==
The community known today as Orson was founded by Merritt Hine (at least one source says "Merrill" Hine) of Woodbridge, Connecticut, in 1840 (one source says he was from Massachusetts and that he founded the village in 1831). He was the son of David Hine, who relocated to Pennsylvania sometime after his son was established there. Like many of the early settlers of Wayne County, the elder Hine was a veteran of the Revolutionary War, having served in the Continental Army. In its early days, the settlement was known as Hine's Corners, and was situated around what is now the intersection of Clark and Oxbow Roads. "Hines Corners" (note that the apostrophe is dropped) is still the accepted name for the intersection of Clark and Oxbow, and it is labeled as such on the United States Geological Survey (USGS) topographic quadrangle map which includes Orson (the quadrangle also being called "Orson").

Hine's Corners quickly grew to a reasonable size and appears in F. W. Beers' 1872 Atlas of Wayne County. The population subsisted in large part on agriculture, dairying, and ice harvesting, the last of which was facilitated by the large number of lakes in the area. The Hine's Corners United Methodist Congregation was formed in 1849 after the conversion of Catharine Hine (née Belcher), wife of Merritt Hine, and the Hine's Corners Methodist Episcopal (ME) Church (later the Orson ME Church) was completed in July 1876. Hine's Corners Post Office opened on September 8, 1873.

On December 25, 1878, Orson C. Chamberlain, a great-grandchild of Catharine and Merritt Hine, died of diphtheria in an epidemic that affected many people in the area. The community came to be known as Orson Corners (virtually always shortened to Orson) in his honor, and the post office was accordingly renamed "Orson Post Office" on September 19, 1896.

When the O&W Railway expanded its service to Scranton, Pennsylvania, in 1890, it created several depots in rural Wayne County, one of which was located in Orson. The station was listed on maps and timetables as both "Orson" and as "Belmont," the latter being a variant name for Belmont Corners. The Orson/Belmont depot, which had the call letters "BM," was located a few yards south of what is now the intersection of Belmont Turnpike and Crosstown Highway, and its construction caused the community to move slightly southwards in order to take advantage of the economic opportunities brought by the new railroad. The rail traffic brought great prosperity to Orson, and at the height of the railroad's popularity, the village boasted two creameries, two ice houses, a grain mill, a sawmill, and several hotels and stores, created in large part to serve the influx of people brought to and through Orson by the O&W.

=== Summer camp industry ===
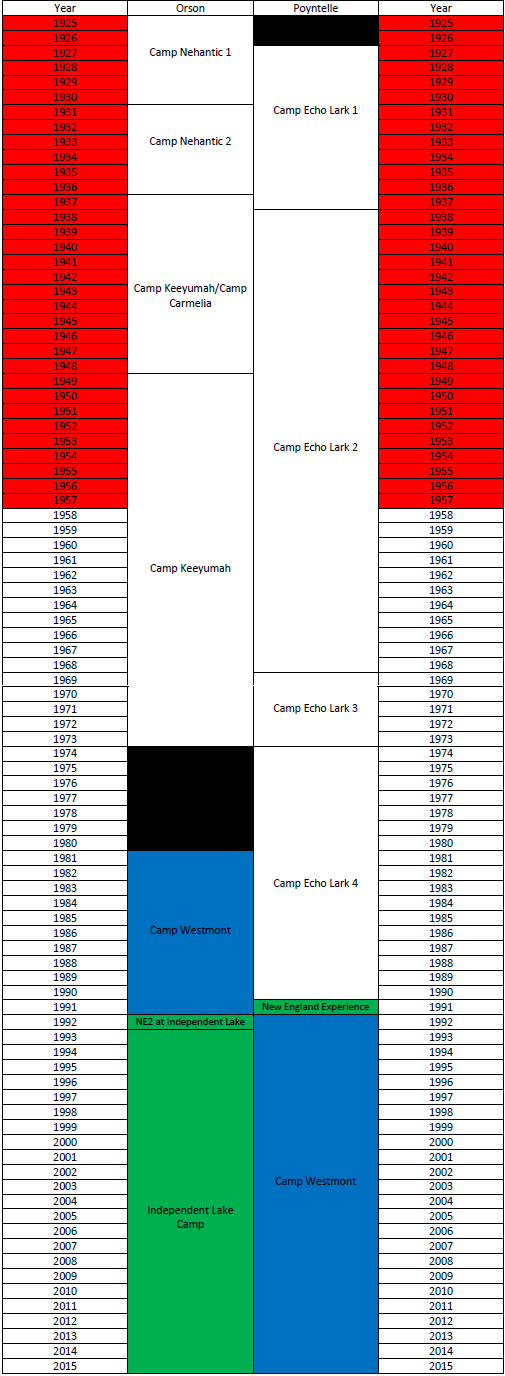
A visual representation of the summer camps situated on the banks of Independent Lake, in either Orson (western bank) or Poyntelle (eastern bank). Numbers with the same name indicate a change in ownership/management. Vacancy Current occupier of eastern bank Current occupier of western bank Years the O&W was in operation

The depot building burned down on March 24, 1933. The O&W did not rebuild it (although it continued to use the stop for freight operations) and got permission on June 5, 1939, from the Pennsylvania Public Utility Commission to convert it to an unstaffed station. It was finally abandoned in 1957 after the O&W went bankrupt, and this event largely marked the end of Orson's notability outside of its contiguity. Many of the village's business establishments closed soon after the railroad did, with the notable exception of the summer camps that would gradually come to replace the railroad as Orson's main source of supra-regional prominence. The first of these was Camp Nehantic, a Jewish girls’ camp that was founded in 1919 by Harry Davidson and his wife, and that had originally been located on Crescent Beach in Niantic, Connecticut. Between 1925 and 1926, Nehantic moved to the western bank of Independent Lake, in Orson, and soon became an important part of the community's economy. In 1931, the camp was bought by J.A. Wells, and then, between 1936 and 1937, it closed and was replaced in 1937 by Camps Carmelia and Keeyumah, twin Jewish camps for girls and boys, respectively. These two had both opened around 1928 on the banks of Lake Champlain in Milton, Vermont (at least one source says they were located in Oneonta, New York, and refers to the boys' camp as "Keeyuma"). The two camps shared facilities and operated in concert with each other until 1949, when they were consolidated into one coeducational, Jewish camp that seems to have been administratively distinct from them, but was nevertheless also called Camp Keeyumah. This Keeyumah was open until 1974.

Meanwhile, the eastern bank of the lake, in Poyntelle, had long been occupied by Camp Echo Lark. Echo Lark had been founded in 1923 in Hyde Park, New York, and had moved to Poyntelle in 1927. Originally a Jewish girl's camp under the direction of Augusta Nomburg, Echo Lark went coed when it was taken over by Ace Weinstein in either 1938 or 1940 (two additional sources say 1932 and 1935, respectively, but they cannot be independently verified). Echo Lark was subsequently owned by Ben Applebaum from 1968 (or 1969) until 1974, when he sold it to Robert and Zelda Gould. Echo Lark survived until 1991, when a camp called New England Experience supplanted it. New England Experience had relocated from Avon, Connecticut, where it had been founded in 1983. It had originally been associated with French Woods Festival of the Performing Arts, a still-operating performing arts-oriented camp in Hancock, New York.

In 1981, after the western bank had been vacant for seven years, a new camp, called Camp Westmont, took over the property. This situation continued until 1992, when Westmont and New England Experience switched places, with Westmont moving to the lake's eastern bank in Poyntelle, where it remains today, and New England Experience relocating to the western bank in Orson. In addition, New England Experience changed its name to NE2 at Independent Lake, and became alternatively known as "Independent Lake Camp." By 1995, the latter moniker had fully replaced the former, a phenomenon which had the effect of obscuring the link between ILC and the original Connecticut camp for those who began attending or working there after the name change.

On September 13, 2001, the owners of ILC, Dan and Anne Gould, purchased land on a nameless hill to the south of the lakefront. This new area was dubbed "Elkview," after Elk Hill (often called Elk Mountain) in Tirzah, Pennsylvania, which is visible from the top of the nameless hill, while the original land that had been part of the previous camps became known as "Lakeside," after Independent Lake.

== Places of interest ==
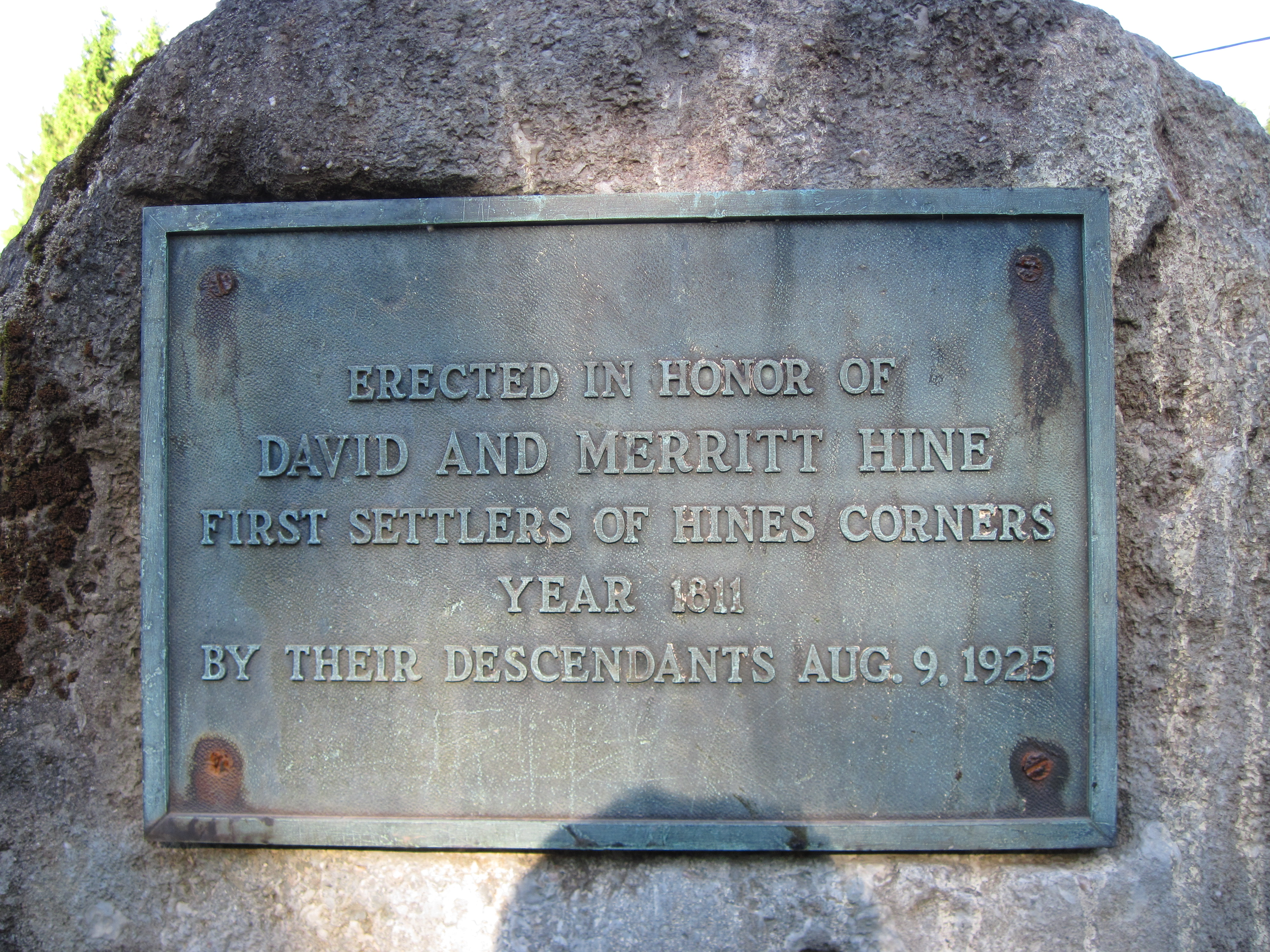
The plaque commemorating the village's founding, located at Hines Corners.

Orson Cemetery, which was originally called Hine's Corners Cemetery, is a small family cemetery which is no longer an active burial site. It contains the graves of Catharine, David, and Merritt Hine, Orson C. Chamberlain, and other early Hine's Corners/Orson residents, and is on Clark Road across from Independent Lake. Orson Field Airport, a privately owned and operated airstrip, connects to Hines Road in northern Orson. The building that once housed the aforementioned Orson ME Church, which was officially abandoned on July 1, 2013, is located on Oxbow Road between Clark and Crosstown Highway.

There are also three cell towers in the village, the first of which is owned by the North-Eastern Pennsylvania Telephone Company (NEP) and is located on the above-mentioned nameless hill in Elkview. The other two are owned by the Commonwealth of Pennsylvania and the Pennsylvania State Police (PSP), respectively, and are both located on Mount Ararat, the former (which is also called Mount Ararat) a few feet southwest of the latter (which is called Waldon Remote). They are accessible by a small, nameless path that connects to Belmont Turnpike near the border of Preston and Mount Pleasant Townships. In addition, the PA O&W Trail, maintained by the Rails-to-Trails Conservancy, runs through Orson.

At Hines Corners, there is a plaque commemorating the founding of the original Village of Hine's Corners by David and Merritt Hine. The plaque was placed there on August 9, 1925, by descendants of the Hine family. It states that the Hines founded the community in 1811, while historical sources (all of which were published before the erection of the plaque) put the founding date at either 1831 or 1840 instead. However, these sources also offer a possible solution: both note that the younger Hine came from Connecticut (or Massachusetts) in 1811 (or 1810), and say that he came first to the nearby Village of Ararat in Ararat Township, Susquehanna County, Pennsylvania. It is possible that family lore may have diverged from the truth in the intervening century between Hine's Corners' founding and the plaque's erection.

=== Orson Post Office and ZIP code situation ===
The previously mentioned Orson Post Office is in the basement of a home on Belmont Turnpike, just under a mile south of the intersection of Belmont and Crosstown. While it is technically still open, it was placed under emergency suspension on May 9, 2008, and no longer provides postal services.

The last entity to use Orson's ZIP code, 18449 (which retains legal status because the post office has not been officially discontinued), in its mailing address was Orson Corners Veterinary Clinic, and all mailing addresses within the village now employ 18439, 18465, or 18470 (the ZIP codes of Lakewood, Pennsylvania; Thompson, Pennsylvania; and Union Dale, Pennsylvania, respectively). While discrepancies between physical and mailing addresses are not uncommon in sparsely populated rural areas, where the number of locally recognized communities routinely exceeds the number of post offices, in most cases a community with a discontinued or suspended post office tends to be absorbed into a single ZIP code (e.g., Panther, Pennsylvania). Since Orson now straddles three ZIP codes, some people without a relatively high degree of familiarity with the area may mistakenly think that a given feature is actually in one of the three communities those ZIP codes primarily represent. This is especially problematic given that two of those communities, Union Dale and Thompson, are incorporated municipalities (and therefore have clearly defined borders), and are not even in the same county as Orson. However, at least in theory, it would still be appropriate to give the physical addresses of places in Orson using "Orson, PA 18449," regardless of what ZIP code these places use in their mailing addresses.

== Education ==
Hine's Corners/Orson has been home to four public schools over the course of its history. The first and second existed during the Hine's Corners-era, and were both situated along what is today Oxbow Road near what is now Clark Road, the first on the southern side of Clark and the second on its northern side. They existed from 1860 to c. 1872 and from c. 1872 to c. 1890, respectively, and both were referred to simply as "Hine's Corners School." The third and fourth schools were built after the community became known as Orson, and were located on Oxbow between Clark and Crosstown Highway, adjacent to Orson ME Church, the third pushed back significantly from the road. The former of these two operated from c. 1890 to 1924, and the latter was open from 1924 to 1956. Both were generally referred to as "Orson School," although at least one source refers to the fourth school as "Simpson School." The building that once housed this last school is still standing and has been converted into a private residence.

Today, Orson, along with the rest of Preston Township, is in Region I of the Wayne Highlands School District. The closest school to Orson is the Preston Area School in Lakewood, which serves pupils grades K-8. For high school-aged students, Honesdale High School serves the entire district. While there are also a few private and parochial schools in Wayne County, none of them are in Preston Township.

== Economy ==
Modern Orson is home to one year-round business. The aforementioned Orson Corners Veterinary Clinic is located on the south side of Crosstown Highway, and mainly serves local dairy farms in the area. Dr. James Watson (not to be confused with James Watson, biologist) of the clinic once maintained a heliport, called Watson Airport, behind the clinic building, which he used to facilitate veterinary visits in the area.

Orson is also the location of one seasonal business, the previously described ILC, which operates annually from the second-to-last Sunday in June until the last Sunday in August.

== Gallery ==
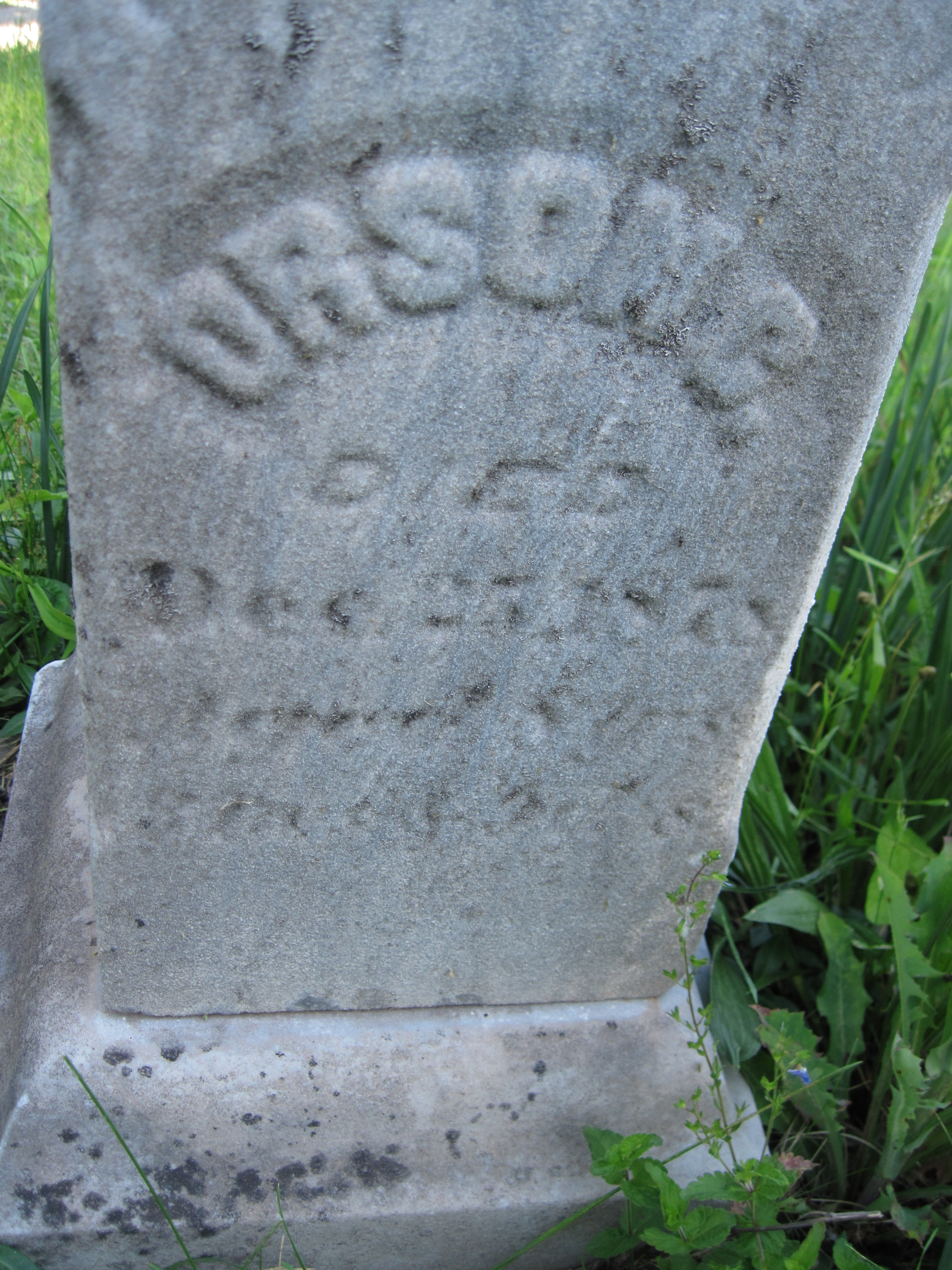
Orson C. Chamberlain's grave.

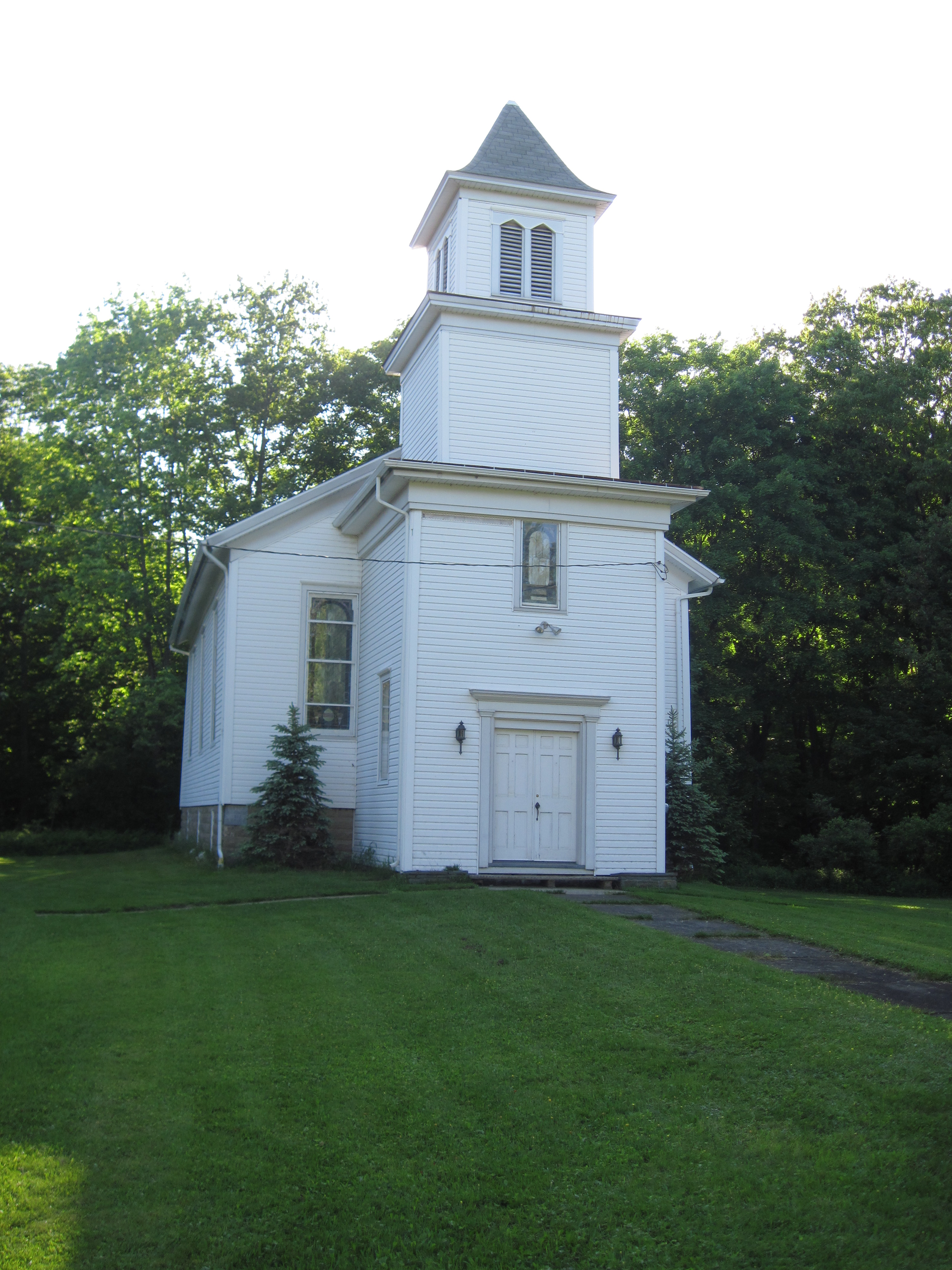
The former Orson UM Church.

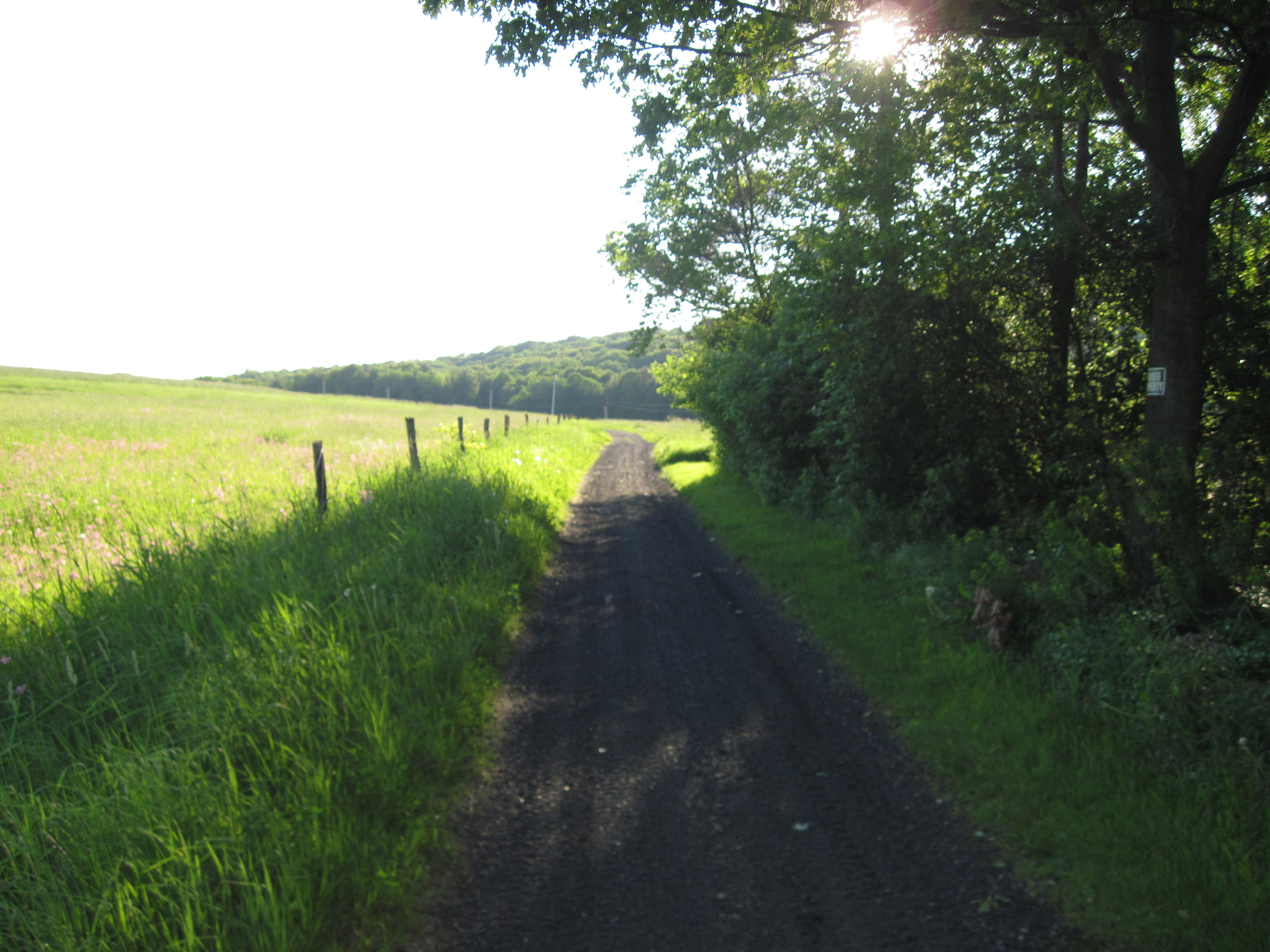
The O&W Trail.

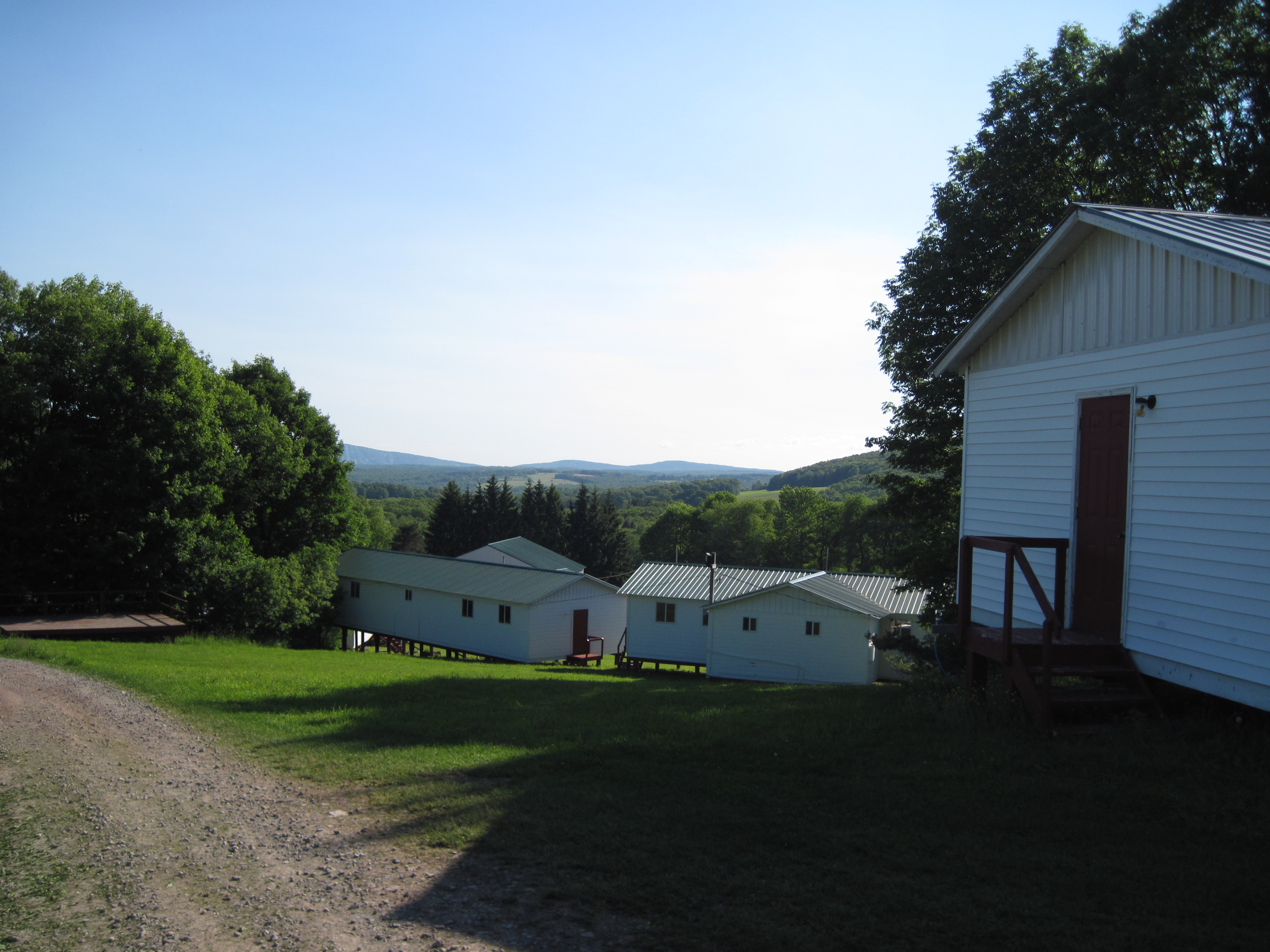
Elk Mountain viewed from the nameless hill above Elkview, with camp buildings in the foreground.

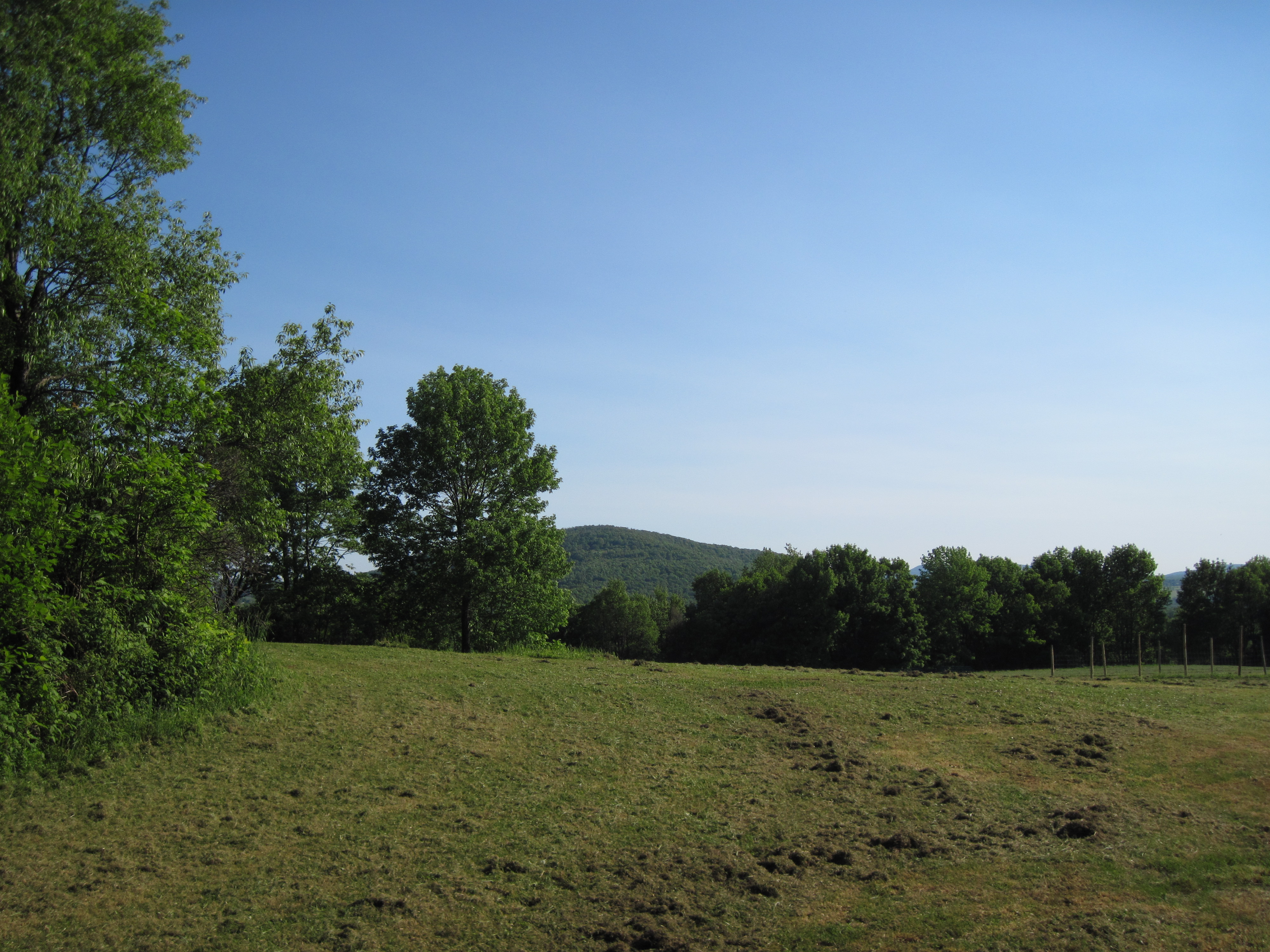
Mount Ararat viewed from the nameless hill above Elkview.

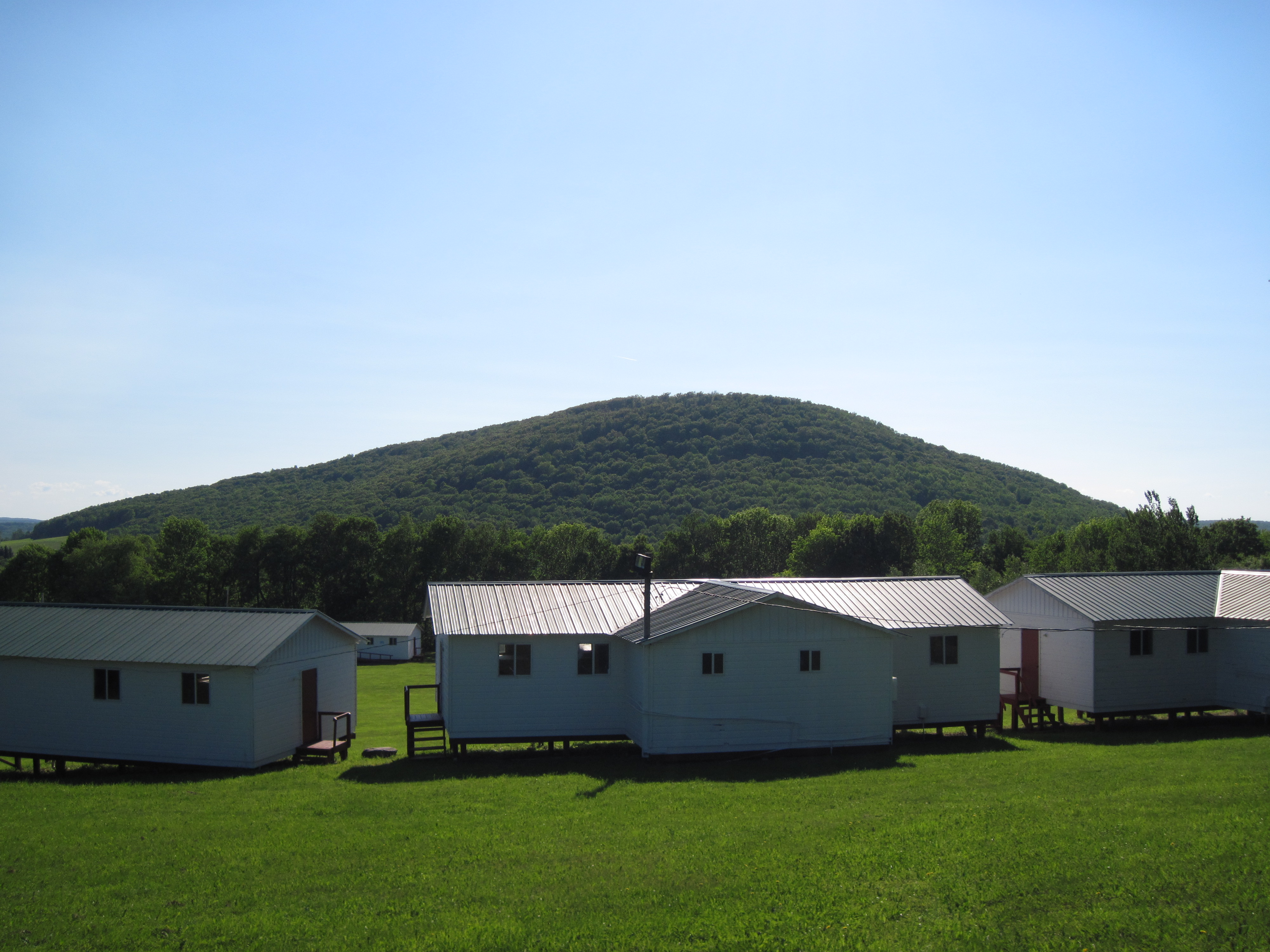
Sugarloaf Mountain viewed from the nameless hill above Elkview, with camp buildings in the foreground.
