= Preston Township, Pennsylvania =

Township in Pennsylvania, US

Preston, Pennsylvania
- Second-class township
- Township of Preston
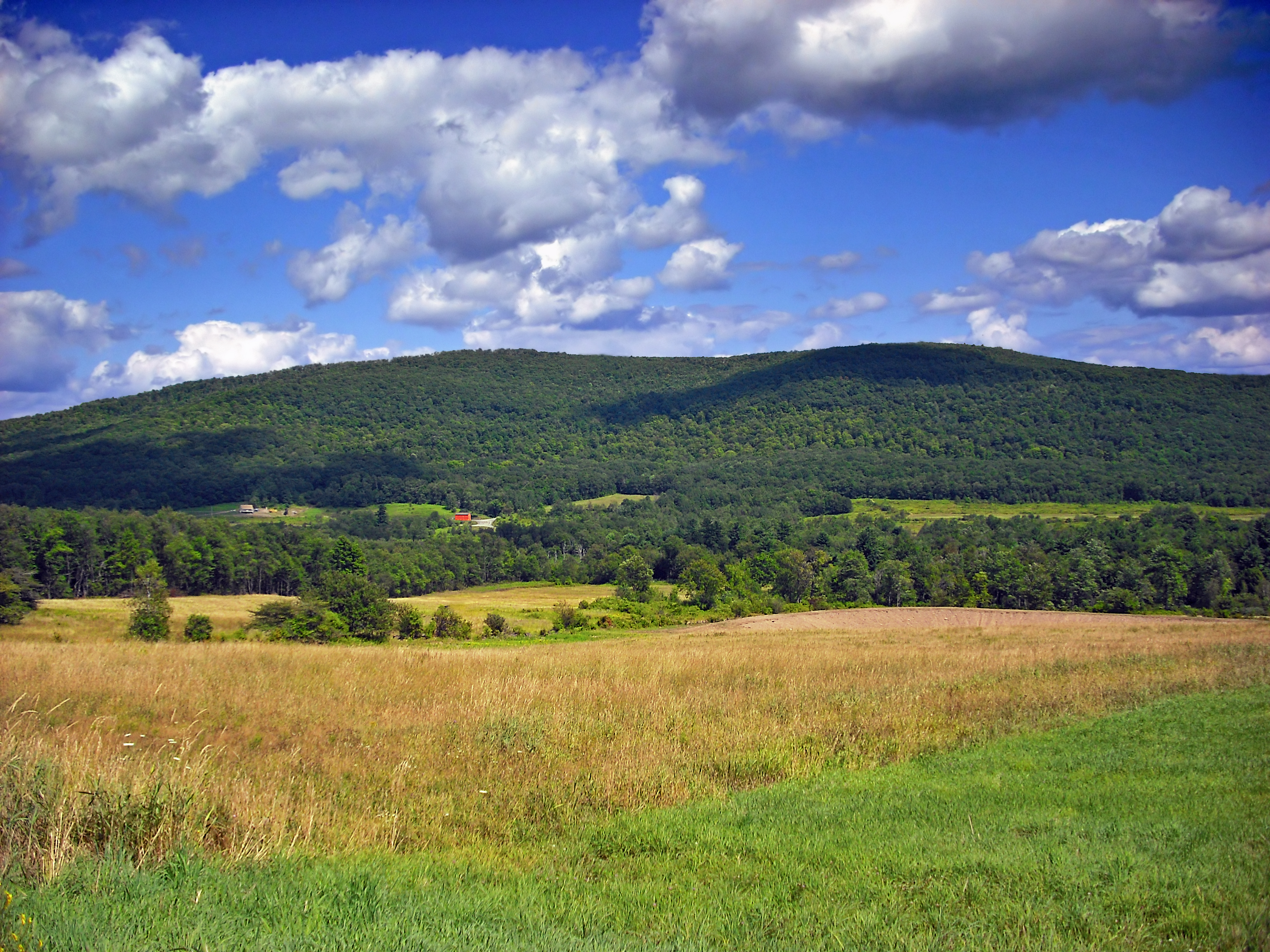
- Mount Ararat, the highest point in Wayne County, viewed from Crosstown Highway between Pennsylvania Route 171 (PA-171) and Belmont Turnpike.

- Location in Wayne County and the state of Pennsylvania.
- Country: United States
- State: Pennsylvania
- US Congressional District: PA-8
- State Senatorial District: 20
- State House of Representatives District: 111
- County: Wayne
- School District: Wayne Highlands; Region I
- Settled: c. 1812
- Incorporated: April 28, 1828
- Founder: Peter Spencer and Ezra Spencer
- Named for: Samuel Preston, Sr.

Government
  - Type: Board of Supervisors
  - Board of Supervisors: Supervisors: Robert Sienko (Chair); Alan Jones (Vice-Chair); J. C. Neu
  - US Representative: Matt Cartwright (D)
  - State Senator: Lisa Baker (R)
  - State Representative: Sandra Major (R)

Area
  - Total: 51.55 sq mi (133.51 km^{2})
  - Land: 49.42 sq mi (128.00 km^{2})
  - Water: 2.13 sq mi (5.51 km^{2})
- Elevation: 2,077 ft (633 m)

Population (2010)
  - Total: 1,014
  - Estimate (2016): 977
  - Density: 19.8/sq mi (7.63/km^{2})
- Time zone: UTC-5 (Eastern (EST))
  - Summer (DST): UTC-4 (Eastern Daylight (EDT))
- Area code: 570
- GNIS feature ID: 1217249
- FIPS code: 42-127-62600
- Website: Preston Township

Preston is a second-class township in Wayne County, Pennsylvania, United States. The township's population was 1,014 at the time of the 2010 United States Census.

== Geography ==
According to the United States Census Bureau, Preston Township has a total area of 51.546 sq mi (133.51 km^{2}), of which 49.419 sq mi (128.00 km^{2}) is land and 2.127 sq mi (5.510 km^{2}), or 4.126%, is water.

The township and surrounding area has been called "the highlands of Wayne [County]" because it is especially mountainous. About half of the highest peak in the county, Mount Ararat (historically called Ararat Mountain, Ararat Peak, Ararat Summit, or simply "Ararat"), is located in the village of Orson (the other half of it is in Belmont Corners in Mount Pleasant Township), as is the entirety of Sugarloaf Mountain (formerly called Sugar Loaf Peak or Sugar-loaf Mountain), another especially prominent summit.

It is also known for its abundance of lakes, most of which are fed by natural springs on their lake bottoms. As a result of this latter fact, combined with its generally high elevation, two significant Pennsylvania rivers, the Lackawanna and the Lackawaxen, begin in Preston Township. Specifically, Bone Pond (or Summit Lake) and Lake Lorain (or Five Mile Pond) in the village of Poyntelle and Independent Lake (formerly known as Independence Pond or Independent Pond, and sometimes known today as Lake Independence or Lake Independent) in Poyntelle and Orson are three of the four sources of the East Branch of the Lackawanna (the fourth being Dunn Pond, or Dunns Lake, in the village of East Ararat in Ararat Township in Susquehanna County), while the West Branch of the Lackawaxen rises from a confluence of several small, unnamed streams in Orson and Poyntelle.

== Communities ==
The following villages are located in Preston Township:

- Lake Como
- Lakewood (once called Winwood)
- Orson (once called Hine's Corners)
- Poyntelle
- Preston (also called Preston Corner)
- Preston Center
- Preston Park
- Shehawken
- Tallmanville
- Wrighter Corner

== Demographics ==
Historical population
Census	Pop.	Note	%±
2010	1,014		—
2016 (est.)	977		−3.6%
U.S. Decennial Census

As of the Census of 2010, there were 1,014 people, 439 households, and 292 families in Preston Township. The township's population density was 20.52 people per square mile (7.922/km^{2}), and there were 983 housing units at an average density of 19.9/sq mi (7.68/km^{2}). The racial makeup of the populace was 98.6% White, 0.0% African American, 0.1% Native American, 0.4% Asian, 0.0% Pacific Islander, 0.0% of other races, and 0.9% of two or more races. Hispanics and Latinos of all races made up 0.5% of the population.

66.5% of Preston Township's households were families, 56.7% were headed by a heterosexual married couple (Pennsylvania did not allow same-sex marriage until May 20, 2014, after the 2010 Census had been completed), and 22.3% included children under the age of 18. 6.2% of households were headed by a female householder with no husband present, 3.6% by a male householder with no wife present, and 33.5% consisted of non-families. 27.8% of all households were made up of individuals, and 10.4% consisted of a person 65 years of age or older living alone. The average household size was 2.31 and the average family size was 2.81.

Preston Townships's age distribution was 19.7% under the age of 18, 2.8% between the ages of 18 and 24, 22.7% between 25 and 44, 35.3% between 45 and 64, and 19.5% 65 years of age or older. The population's median age was 48.0 years. For every 100 females, there were 98.0 males. For every 100 females age 18 and over, there were 99.0 males in the same age range.

According to American Community Survey (ACS) estimates, the median income for a household in Preston Township in 2013 was $49,167, and the median income for a family was $68,594. Males had a median income of $30,850, while females had a median income of $32,125. The per capita income for the township was $25,393. 5.7% of families and 15.5% of people were below the Census Bureau's poverty thresholds (different from the federally defined poverty guidelines), including 26.0% of those under age 18 and 3.7% of those age 65 or over.

According to self-reported ancestry figures recorded by the ACS, the five largest ancestral groups in Preston Township in 2013 were Germans (27.3%), English (22.5%), Irish (17.6%), Poles (13.3%), and Russians (5.5%). Those reporting American ancestry made up 3.4% of the population.

== Education ==
For children in grades K through 8, Preston Township is primarily served by the Preston Area School in Lakewood, part of the Wayne Highlands School District. Because there are no private or parochial schools within the township, high school students (grades 9 through 12) may attend one of two public high schools. Honesdale High School, the only public high school in the district, or Hancock Middle/High School located in Hancock, NY. Both schools offer a unique education experience. Honesdale High school has a large diverse student body with many extracurricular activities. Hancock being a much smaller school offers the students much more individual teaching environment.
