= Equinunk, Pennsylvania =

Unincorporated community in Pennsylvania, US

- Village
- Village of Equinunk
- Equinunk's Location within Pennsylvania. Equinunk (the United States)
- Coordinates: 41°51′21″N 75°13′26″W
- Country: United States
- State: Pennsylvania
- U.S. Congressional District: PA-8
- School District: Wayne Highlands; Region I
- County: Wayne
- Magisterial District: 22-3-04
- Townships: Buckingham; Manchester
- Founded by: Isaiah Scudder
- Elevation: 883 ft (269 m)
- Time zone: UTC-5 (Eastern (EST))
  - Summer (DST): UTC-4 (Eastern Daylight (EDT))
- ZIP code: 18417
- Area code: 570
- GNIS feature ID: 1174297
- FIPS code: 42-127-09824-23848
- Major Roads: PA 191 (Hancock Highway) – Hancock, NY
- Waterways: Delaware River, Equinunk Creek

Equinunk is a village in Buckingham and Manchester Townships in Wayne County, Pennsylvania, United States. The community's name is pronounced EE-kwi-nunk.
