= Berlin Township, Wayne County, Pennsylvania =

Township in Pennsylvania, US

- Second-class township
- Township of Berlin
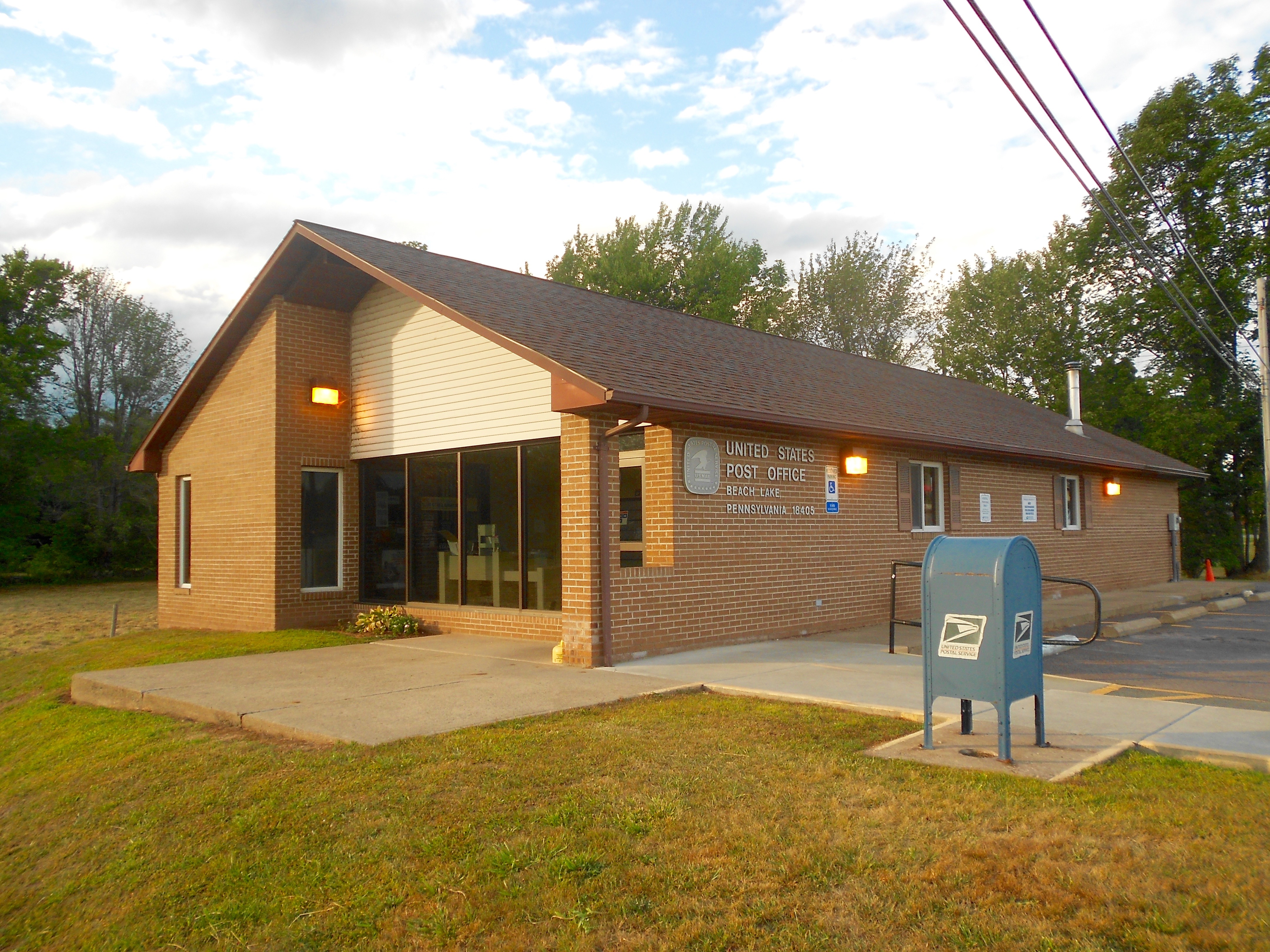
- Beach Lake post office

- Location in Wayne County and the state of Pennsylvania.
- Country: United States
- State: Pennsylvania
- US Congressional District: PA-8
- State Senatorial District: 20
- State House of Representatives District: 139
- County: Wayne
- School District: Wayne Highlands; Region III
- Incorporated: November 28, 1826
- Named for: Berlin, Germany

Government
  - Type: Board of Supervisors
  - Board of Supervisors: Supervisors: Paul Henry; Charles Gries; Cathy Hunt
  - US Representative: Matt Cartwright (D)
  - State Senator: Lisa Baker (R)
  - State Representative: Michael Peifer (R)

Area
  - Total: 39.56 sq mi (102.46 km^{2})
  - Land: 38.45 sq mi (99.59 km^{2})
  - Water: 1.11 sq mi (2.87 km^{2})
- Elevation: 1,211 ft (369.1 m)

Population (2020)
  - Total: 2,452 ▲
  - Estimate (2021): 2,455
  - Density: 63.2/sq mi (24.42/km^{2})
- Time zone: UTC-5 (Eastern (EST))
  - Summer (DST): UTC-4 (Eastern Daylight (EDT))
- Area codes: 570 and 272
- GNIS feature ID: 1217213
- FIPS code: 42-127-05784
- Website: www.berlintownship.org

Berlin Township (Note: formally the Township of Berlin) is a second-class township in Wayne County, Pennsylvania, United States. The township's population was 2,452 at the time of the 2020 United States Census.

== Geography ==
According to the United States Census Bureau, the township has a total area of 39.6 square miles (103 km^{2}), 38.5 square miles (100 km^{2}) of which is land and 1.1 square miles (2.8 km^{2}) (2.78%) of which is water.

=== Communities ===
The following villages are located in Berlin Township:

- Beach Lake (also called Beech Pond)
- Berlin Center (also called Berlin Centre)
- Bethel
- East Berlin
- Laurella

== Demographics ==
Historical population
Census	Pop.	Note	%±
2010	2,578		—
2020	2,452		−4.9%
2021 (est.)	2,455		0.1%
U.S. Decennial Census

As of the census of 2010, there were 2,578 people and 712 families residing in the township. The population density was 66.9 inhabitants per square mile (25.8/km^{2}). There were 1,234 housing units at an average density of 32.1 per square mile (12.4/km^{2}). The racial makeup of the township was 97.5% White, 0.6% Black or African American, 0.1% American Indian or Alaska Native, 0.7% Asian. 0.2% of the township's inhabitants classified themselves as being from other races, and 0.9% identified as two or more races. Hispanics and Latinos of any race made up 2.4% of the population.

There were 1,002 households, 57.9% of which were heterosexual married couples living together (Pennsylvania did not start performing same-sex marriages until May 20, 2014), and 29.9% of which had children under the age of 18 living with them. % had a male householder with no wife present, while 8.1% had a female householder with no husband present, and 28.9% of households were non-families. 23.6% of all households were made up of individuals, 10.8% of which consisted of an individual 65 years of age or older. The average household size was 2.55 and the average family size was 3.00.

The township's population was relatively age-diverse, with 23.1% of residents under the age of 18, 60.5% aged 18 to 64, and 16.4% aged 65 years of age or older. The median age was 42.8 years.

The median income for a household in the township was $54,844, and the median income for a family was $65,375. The median income for male full-time, year-round workers was $50,902, while similar females had a median income of $28,203. The per capita income for the township was $27,739. About 7% of families and 10.4% of the population were below the poverty threshold, including 27.8% of those under age 18 and 2.2% of those ages 65 or over.
