= Honesdale National Bank =

The Honesdale National Bank
- Type: Privately held company
- Industry: Banking
- Founded: December 26, 1836; 189 years ago
- Headquarters: Honesdale, Pennsylvania
- Key people: William Schweighofer, Chairman; Thomas E. Sheridan, Jr., President & CEO
- Total assets: $1.17 billion (June 30, 2026)
- Total equity: $154 million (June 30, 2026)
- Website: www.hnbbank.bank

The Honesdale National Bank is a bank headquartered in Honesdale, Pennsylvania. Established on December 26, 1836, the bank holds the distinction of being the area’s oldest, independent, community bank. It has twelve full-service offices across Wayne, Pike, Susquehanna, Lackawanna and Luzerne Counties. Financial and trust services for customers are also provided through the HNB Financial Group headquartered in Honesdale, and the HNB Mortgage Center headquartered in Wilkes-Barre. The bank offers customer service through personal banking, business banking and wealth management and also serves the greater local communities. Honat Bancorp, Inc. (OTCID Basic: HONT) is the bank's parent company and the sole owner.

== History ==
Honesdale Bank opened at 1011 Main Street, Honesdale, Pennsylvania on December 26, 1836. Fifteen years later, the Bank relocated to a new building at 10th & Main Streets in Honesdale. In 1864, national currency and a banking system was established and the Bank began operations under The Honesdale National Bank (HNB) name. The HNB joined the Federal Reserve System in 1914.

In 2012, the bank opened a branch in Lakewood, Pennsylvania.

In 2013, the bank opened a branch in Lackawanna County, Pennsylvania.

In February 2017, David E. Raven was named president and chief executive officer of the bank.
