= Van Auken Creek =

River in Pennsylvania, United States

Coordinates: 41°34′54″N 75°19′29″W

Van Auken Creek is a 8.2-mile-long (13.2 km) tributary of the Lackawaxen River in Wayne County, Pennsylvania in the United States.

Van Auken Creek and the West Branch Lackawaxen River join near Prompton to form the main stem of the Lackawaxen River.

== See also ==
- List of rivers of Pennsylvania
