= Mount Ararat (Pennsylvania) =

Mountain in Pennsylvania, United States

- Ararat Mountain, Ararat Peak, Ararat Summit, Ararat
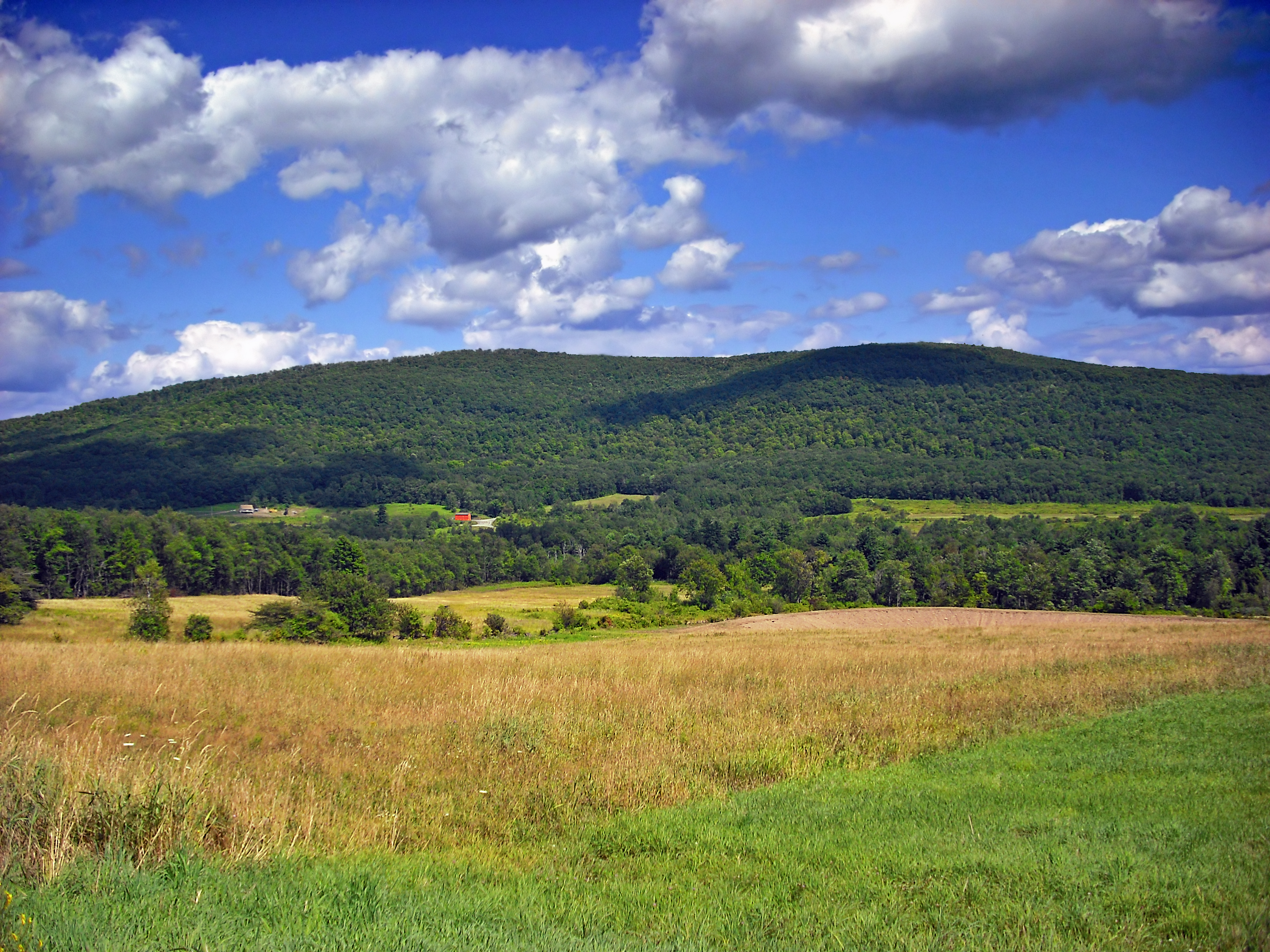
- Mount Ararat, as seen from East Ararat on Crosstown Highway between Belmont Turnpike and Pennsylvania Route 171 (PA-171), facing northeast.

Highest point
- Elevation: 2,638 ft (804 m)
- Prominence: 816 ft (249 m)
- Listing: Mountains of the United States
- Coordinates: 41°47′29″N 75°27′20″W

Geography
- Location within Pennsylvania
- Location: Belmont Corners, Pennsylvania Orson, Pennsylvania
- Parent range: Glaciated Allegheny Plateau (Appalachian Mountains)
- Topo map: USGS Orson (PA)

Mount Ararat is a mountain located in the Pennsylvania villages of Belmont Corners and Orson. Its summit, which is in Orson, is the highest point in Wayne County, Pennsylvania, and one of the higher points in eastern Pennsylvania. Mount Ararat is located in the Glaciated Low Plateaus geological section of Pennsylvania. This section is characterized with low rolling hills and modest relief. This summit is of low relief but stands as a peak above the countryside.

The west and north sides of Mount Ararat drain into the East Branch of the Lackawanna River, thence into the Susquehanna River, and into the Chesapeake Bay. The east side of Ararat drains into the West Branch of the Lackawaxen River, thence into the Delaware River, and into Delaware Bay.
