= Lackawaxen River =

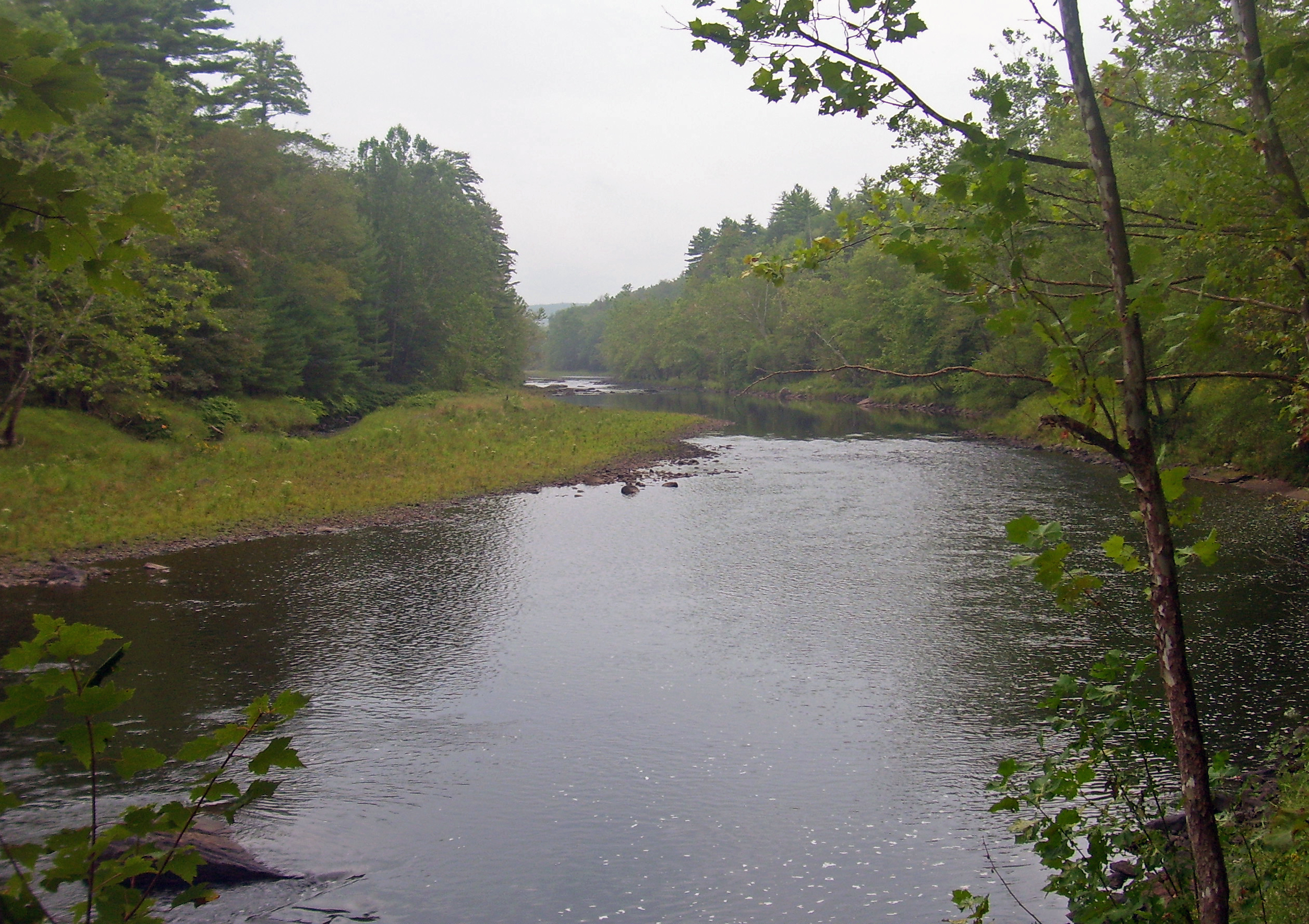
- The Lackawaxen River several miles above its confluence with the Delaware River

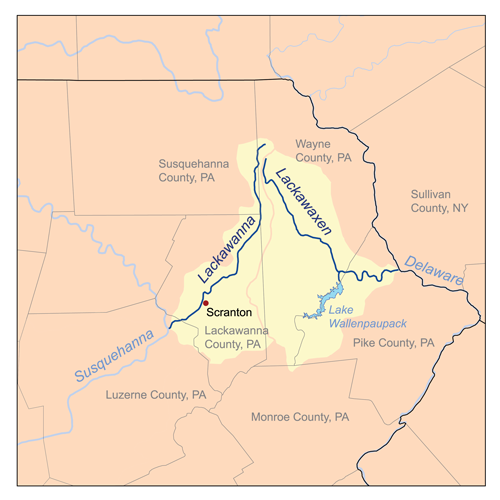
- Map of Lackawaxen and Lackawanna watersheds

Location
- Country: United States
- State: Pennsylvania
- Region: Poconos
- Counties: Wayne, Pike

Physical characteristics
- Source: West Branch Lackawaxen River
  - location: Confluence above Belmont Lake, in Orson and Poyntelle
  - coordinates: 41°47′31″N 75°25′54″W
  - elevation: 1,840 ft (560 m)
- 2nd source: Johnson Creek
  - location: Mt. Pleasant Twp.
  - coordinates: 41°44′45″N 75°23′1″W
  - elevation: 1,480 ft (450 m)
- Source confluence: E of PA 170
  - location: Creamtown
  - coordinates: 41°40′40″N 75°22′44″W
  - elevation: 1,250 ft (380 m)
- Mouth: Delaware River
  - location: Lackawaxen
  - coordinates: 41°29′13″N 74°59′14″W
  - elevation: 580 ft (180 m)
- Length: 31 mi (50 km)
- Basin size: 598 sq mi (1,550 km^{2})
- Discharge
  - location: Rowland
  - average: 1,318 cu ft/s (37.3 m^{3}/s)
  - minimum: 53 cu ft/s (1.5 m^{3}/s)
  - maximum: 13,208 cu ft/s (374.0 m^{3}/s)
- Discharge
  - location: Honesdale
  - average: 394 cu ft/s (11.2 m^{3}/s)
  - maximum: 34,000 cu ft/s (960 m^{3}/s)

Basin features
- Tributaries
  - right: Wallenpaupack Creek
- Discharge figures from "Water data for Lackawaxen River at Howland, 2008" (PDF). United States Geological Survey. and

The Lackawaxen River is a 31.3-mile-long (50.4 km) tributary of the Delaware River in northeastern Pennsylvania in the United States. The river flows through a largely rural area in the northern Pocono Mountains, draining an area of approximately 598 square miles (1,550 km^{2}).

Its source is in the borough of Prompton in western Wayne County, at the confluence of the West Branch and Van Auken Creek. It flows past Honesdale and Hawley, where it is joined from the southwest by Wallenpaupack Creek and by Middle Creek. Water discharged from the Lake Wallenpaupack hydroelectric facility enters the river downstream from Hawley. The river continues east and joins the Delaware at Lackawaxen. East of Honesdale, it was deepened as part of the Delaware and Hudson Canal project.

The river is a popular destination for canoeing and recreational fly fishing for trout. It was reportedly where the American author Zane Grey first learned to fly fish. The Stourbridge Line railroad follows the river from Honesdale to its discharge at Lackawaxen.

Lackawaxen is Lenape for "swift waters".

== West Branch Lackawaxen River ==
The West Branch, approximately 21.5 miles (34.6 km) long, rises from a confluence of several small streams in the villages of Orson and Poyntelle in northern Wayne County, and flows south-southeast through Belmont Lake in Belmont Corners. After a second confluence, with Johnson Creek, it flows southeast through Prompton Lake reservoir, to a third confluence, with Van Auken Creek, to form the main stem.

== See also ==
- List of Pennsylvania rivers
