= Equinunk Creek =

River in Pennsylvania, United States

Coordinates: 41.83161°N 75.28334°W

Equinunk Creek is a 15.4-mile-long (24.8 km) tributary of the Delaware River in Wayne County, Pennsylvania in the United States.

Equinunk Creek (Lenape for "where cloth is distributed") joins the Delaware River at Equinunk.

== See also ==
- List of Pennsylvania rivers
