= Lakewood, Pennsylvania =

Unincorporated community in Pennsylvania, US

- Village
- Village of Lakewood
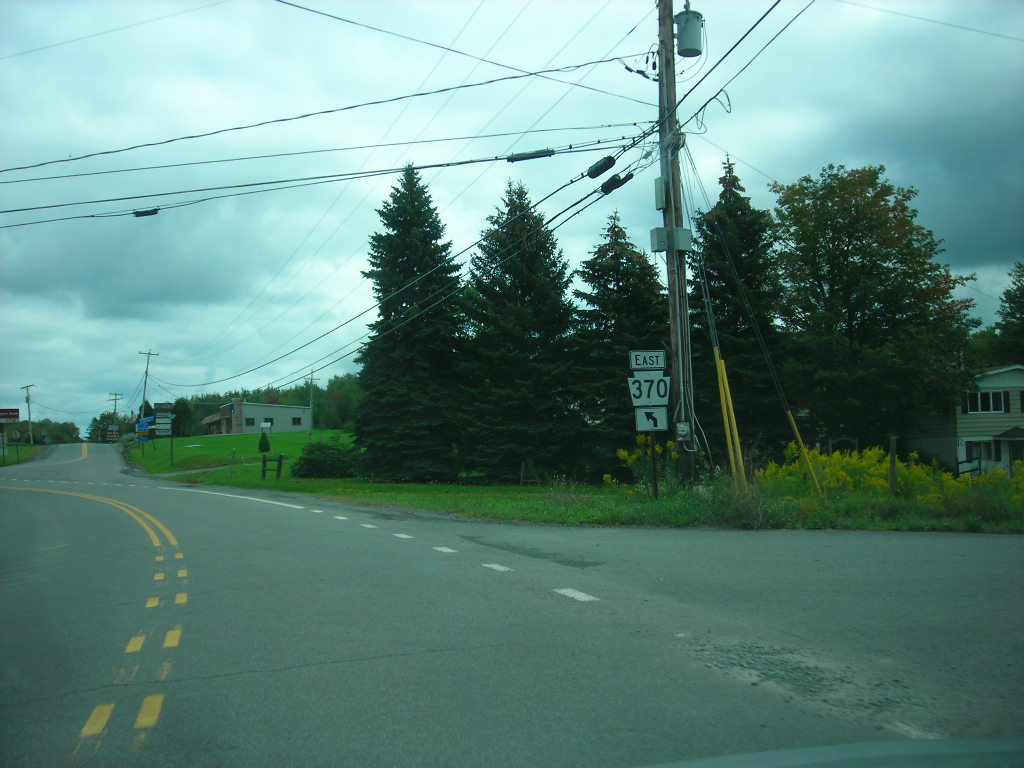
- Lakewood, as seen from PA-370.
- Nicknames: Little York, Lakin, Como, Winwood (all historical)
- Lakewood's location within Pennsylvania.
- Coordinates: 41°51′07″N 75°22′53″W
- Country: United States
- State: Pennsylvania
- U.S. Congressional District: 10
- County: Wayne
- School District: Wayne Highlands; Region I
- Magisterial District: 22-3-04
- Township: Preston
- Settled: 1817
- Founder: David Wooley, James Moore, and Franklin Duval
- Elevation: 1,778 ft (542 m)
- Time zone: UTC-5 (Eastern (EST))
  - Summer (DST): UTC-4 (Eastern Daylight (EDT))
- ZIP code: 18439
- Area code: 570
- GNIS feature ID: 1181094
- FIPS code: 42-127-62600-41096

Lakewood is a village that is located in Preston Township, Wayne County, Pennsylvania, United States. It is situated on Pennsylvania Route 370 (PA-370), approximately 7 miles (11 km) east of Thompson, Pennsylvania and about 10 miles (16 km) southwest of Hancock, New York.

== History and notable features ==
The Preston Township Municipal Building, the township's only school, Preston Area School, and the Northern Wayne Community Library, part of the Wayne Library Alliance, are both located within the community.

There are also multiple summer camps in the community, including Camp Ramah, Camp Morasha, Camp Weequahic, Camp Nesher, Camp Zeke, Camp Lavi and Yeshivas Kayitz Program.

The Preston Area School has a student enrollment of approximately 190 from grades K-8. The school also acts as a community center. The school has 28 full and part-time teachers, as well as a support staff of 10 members, and a parent–teacher organization.
