= Prompton, Pennsylvania =

Borough in Pennsylvania, US

Borough of Prompton
- Borough
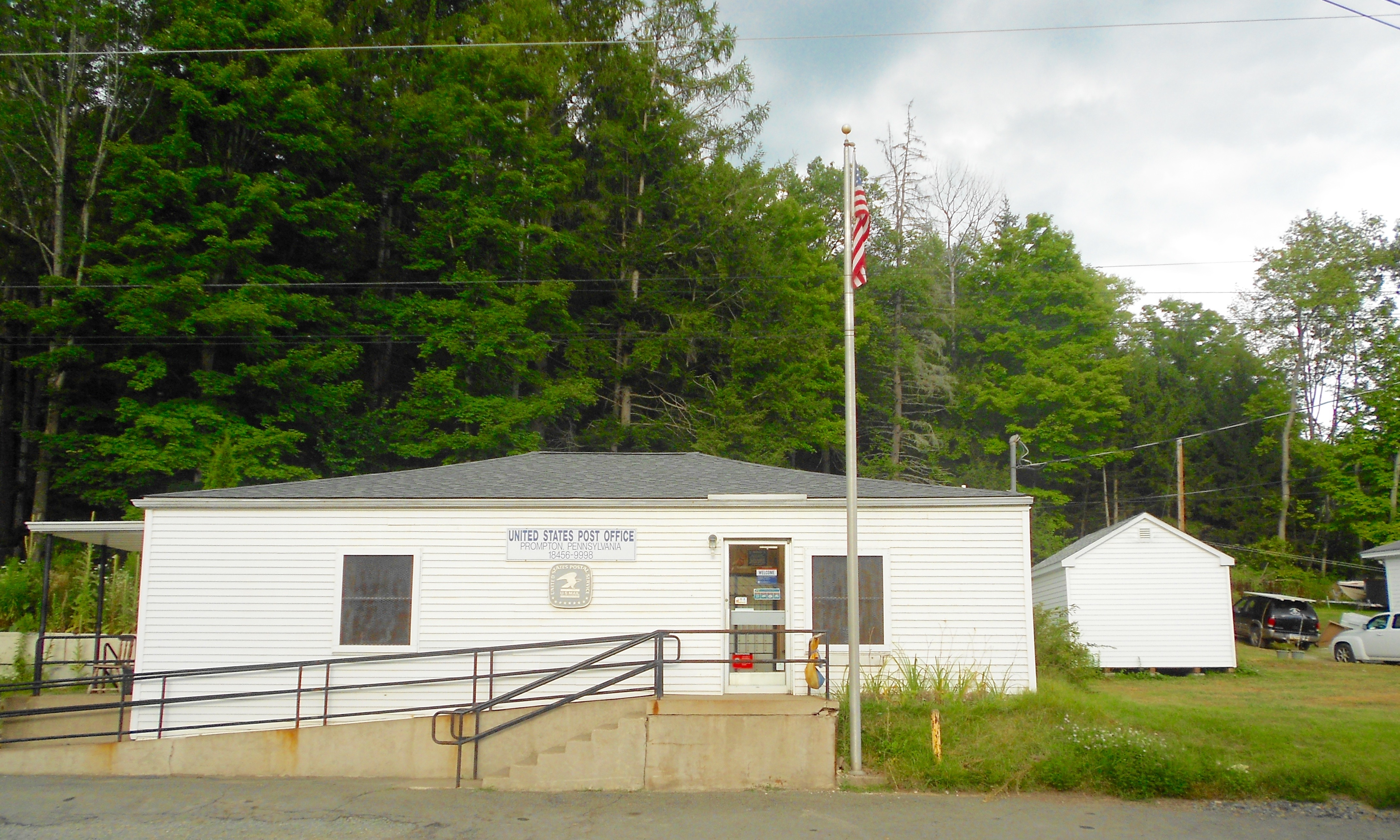
- Post office, ZIP code 18456-9998

- Location in Wayne County and the U.S. state of Pennsylvania.

- Location of Prompton in Pennsylvania Prompton (the United States)
- Coordinates: 41°34′56″N 75°19′48″W
- Country: United States
- State: Pennsylvania
- County: Wayne

Area
  - Total: 1.67 sq mi (4.32 km^{2})
  - Land: 1.53 sq mi (3.97 km^{2})
  - Water: 0.14 sq mi (0.35 km^{2})
- Elevation: 1,234 ft (376 m)

Population (2020)
  - Total: 237
  - Density: 154.6/sq mi (59.71/km^{2})
- Time zone: UTC-5 (EST)
  - Summer (DST): UTC-4 (EDT)
- Postal code: 18456
- Area code: 570
- FIPS code: 42-62744
- Website: Prompton Borough

Prompton is a borough that is located in Wayne County, Pennsylvania, United States. As of the 2020 census, Prompton had a population of 237.

== Geography ==
Prompton is located at 41°34′56″N 75°19′48″W (41.582133, -75.329922).

According to the United States Census Bureau, the borough has a total area of 1.7 square miles (4.4 km^{2}), of which 1.6 square miles (4.1 km^{2}) is land and 0.1 square miles (0.26 km^{2}) (7.51%) is water.

== Demographics ==
=== 2010 census ===
Historical population
Census	Pop.	Note	%±
1850	306		—
1860	296		−3.3%
1870	394		33.1%
1880	310		−21.3%
1890	289		−6.8%
1900	258		−10.7%
1910	263		1.9%
1920	220		−16.3%
1930	186		−15.5%
1940	202		8.6%
1950	197		−2.5%
1960	204		3.6%
1970	224		9.8%
1980	249		11.2%
1990	238		−4.4%
2000	243		2.1%
2010	250		2.9%
2020	237		−5.2%

As of the census of 2010, there were 250 people, 104 households, and 68 families living in the borough.

The population density was 156.25 inhabitants per square mile (60.33/km^{2}). There were 111 housing units at an average density of 69.4 per square mile.

The racial makeup of the borough was 96.8% White and 3.2% from two or more races. Hispanic or Latino of any race were 3.2% of the population.

Of the 104 households in this township, 29.8% had children who were under the age of eighteen living with them, 46.2% were married couples living together, 12.5% had a female householder with no husband present, and 34.6% were non-families. 28.8% of households were one-person households and 16.3% were one-person households with residents who were aged sixty-five or older.

The average household size was 2.40 and the average family size was 2.96.

The age distribution was 24% of residents who were under the age of eighteen, 59.6% who were aged eighteen to sixty-four, and 16.4% who were aged sixty-five or older. The median age was 39.7 years.

The median household income was $24,375 and the median family income was $31,250. Males had a median income of $31,071 compared with that of $19,167 for females.

The per capita income for the borough was $15,601.

Approximately 12.2% of families and 10.8% of the population were living below the poverty line, including 22.6% of those who were under the age of eighteen and 9.5% of those who were aged sixty-five or older.

=== 2000 census ===
At the time of the 2000 census, there were 243 people, 103 households, and 71 families living in the borough.

The population density was 152.4 inhabitants per square mile (58.8/km^{2}). There were 112 housing units at an average density of 70.2 per square mile (27.1/km^{2}).

The racial makeup of the borough was 98.77% White, 0.82% Asian, and 0.41% from two or more races.

Of the 103 households in the township, 31.1% had children who were under the age of eighteen living with them, 57.3% were married couples living together, 9.7% had a female householder with no husband present, and 30.1% were non-families. 28.2% of households were one-person households and 16.5% were one-person households with residents who were aged sixty-five or older.

The average household size was 2.36 and the average family size was 2.88.

The age distribution was 24.7% of residents who were under the age of eighteen, 3.3% who were aged eighteen to twenty-four, 28.0% who were aged forty-five to sixty-four, 25.5% who were aged forty-five to sixty-four, and 18.5% who were aged sixty-five or older. The median age was forty-two years.

For every one hundred females, there were 94.4 males. For every one hundred females who were aged eighteen or older, there were 84.8 males.

The median household income was $24,375 and the median family income was $31,250. Males had a median income of $31,071 compared with that of $19,167 for females.

The per capita income for the borough was $15,601.

Approximately 12.2% of families and 10.8% of the population were living below the poverty line, including 22.6% of those who were under the age of eighteen and 9.5% of those who were aged sixty-five or older.

== Education ==
The school district is the Wayne Highlands School District.
