= Wayne Highlands School District =

School district in Pennsylvania

Address
- 474 Grove Street Northeastern Pennsylvania Honesdale, Pennsylvania, 18431-1099; United States
- Coordinates: 41.70649°N 75.20107°W

District information
- Type: Public
- Grades: Preschool-12th
- Established: 1 July 1970; 56 years ago

Other information
- Website: www.waynehighlands.org

Wayne Highlands is a third-class school district in Wayne County, Pennsylvania. The district's population was 20,870 at the time of the 2010 United States Census.

Organized on July 1, 1970, the district operates preschools, four elementary schools, one middle school, and one high school. It covers 435 square miles (1,130 km^{2}) (roughly one-third the size of Rhode Island), making it the second largest geographical school district in the state. According to federal census data, the district's population decreased by 636 residents from 21,506 residents in 2000. In 2009, the District residents’ per capita income was $17,330, while the median family income was $40,683. In the Commonwealth, the median family income was $49,501 and the United States median family income was $49,445, in 2010.

== Regions and constituent municipalities ==
Map of Wayne County with the highlighted boroughs and townships served by WHSD

The district is divided into three regions, which include the following municipalities:

=== Region I ===
- Buckingham Township
- Damascus Township
- Manchester Township
- Preston Township
- Scott Township

=== Region II ===
- Bethany Borough
- Dyberry Township
- Honesdale Borough
- Lebanon Township

=== Region III ===
- Berlin Township
- Cherry Ridge Township
- Oregon Township
- Prompton Borough
- Texas Township (partially in the Wallenpaupack Area School District)

== Schools ==
- Damascus Area School
- Honesdale High School
- Lakeside Elementary School
- Preston Area School
- Stourbridge Primary School
- Wayne Highlands Middle School

== Extracurriculars ==
Wayne Highlands School District offers a wide variety of clubs, activities and an extensive sports program.

=== Sports ===
The District funds:

Boys

- Baseball - AAA
- Basketball- AAA
- Cross Country - AA
- Football - AAA
- Golf - AAA
- Soccer - AA
- Tennis - AA
- Track and Field - AAA
- Wrestling - AAA

Girls

- Basketball - AAA
- Cross Country - AA
- Field Hockey - AAA
- Soccer (Fall) - AA
- Softball - AAA
- Girls' Tennis - AA
- Track and Field - AAA
- Wrestling - AAA

Middle School Sports

Boys

- Baseball
- Basketball
- Cross Country
- Football
- Soccer
- Track and Field
- Wrestling

Girls

- Basketball
- Cross Country
- Field Hockey
- Softball
- Soccer (fall)
- Track and Field
- Wrestling

According to PIAA directory July 2012

== See also ==
- Wayne County, Pennsylvania
- List of school districts in Pennsylvania
