= Pennsylvania's congressional districts =

Congressional districting since 2003

Map of district boundaries since 2023 Interactive map version

After the 2000 census, the Commonwealth of Pennsylvania was divided into 19 congressional districts, decreasing from 21 due to reapportionment.

After the 2010 census, the number of districts decreased again to 18. In the 2022 midterms, per the 2020 United States census, Pennsylvania lost one congressional seat, bringing the delegation's number to 17 districts.

== Current districts and representatives ==
The congressional delegation from Pennsylvania consists of 17 members. In the current delegation, 7 representatives are Democrats and 10 are Republicans. The list below identifies the members of the United States House delegation from Pennsylvania, their service start dates, and current court-ordered district boundaries.

Current U.S. representatives from Pennsylvania
| District | Member (Residence) | Party | Incumbent since | CPVI (2025) | District map |
|---|---|---|---|---|---|
| 1st | Brian Fitzpatrick (Levittown) | Republican | January 3, 2017 | D+1 | |
| 2nd | Brendan Boyle (Philadelphia) | Democratic | January 3, 2015 | D+19 | |
| 3rd | Dwight Evans (Philadelphia) | Democratic | November 14, 2016 | D+40 | |
| 4th | Madeleine Dean (Bala Cynwyd) | Democratic | January 3, 2019 | D+8 | |
| 5th | Mary Gay Scanlon (Swarthmore) | Democratic | November 13, 2018 | D+15 | |
| 6th | Chrissy Houlahan (Devon) | Democratic | January 3, 2019 | D+6 | |
| 7th | Ryan Mackenzie (Lower Macungie Township) | Republican | January 3, 2025 | R+1 | |
| 8th | Rob Bresnahan (Dallas Township) | Republican | January 3, 2025 | R+4 | |
| 9th | Dan Meuser (Dallas) | Republican | January 3, 2019 | R+19 | |
| 10th | Scott Perry (Dillsburg) | Republican | January 3, 2013 | R+3 | |
| 11th | Lloyd Smucker (West Lampeter Township) | Republican | January 3, 2017 | R+11 | |
| 12th | Summer Lee (Swissvale) | Democratic | January 3, 2023 | D+10 | |
| 13th | John Joyce (Hollidaysburg) | Republican | January 3, 2019 | R+23 | |
| 14th | Guy Reschenthaler (Peters Township) | Republican | January 3, 2019 | R+17 | |
| 15th | Glenn Thompson (Howard) | Republican | January 3, 2009 | R+19 | |
| 16th | Mike Kelly (Butler) | Republican | January 3, 2011 | R+11 | |
| 17th | Chris Deluzio (Aspinwall) | Democratic | January 3, 2023 | D+3 | |

== Historical elections summary ==
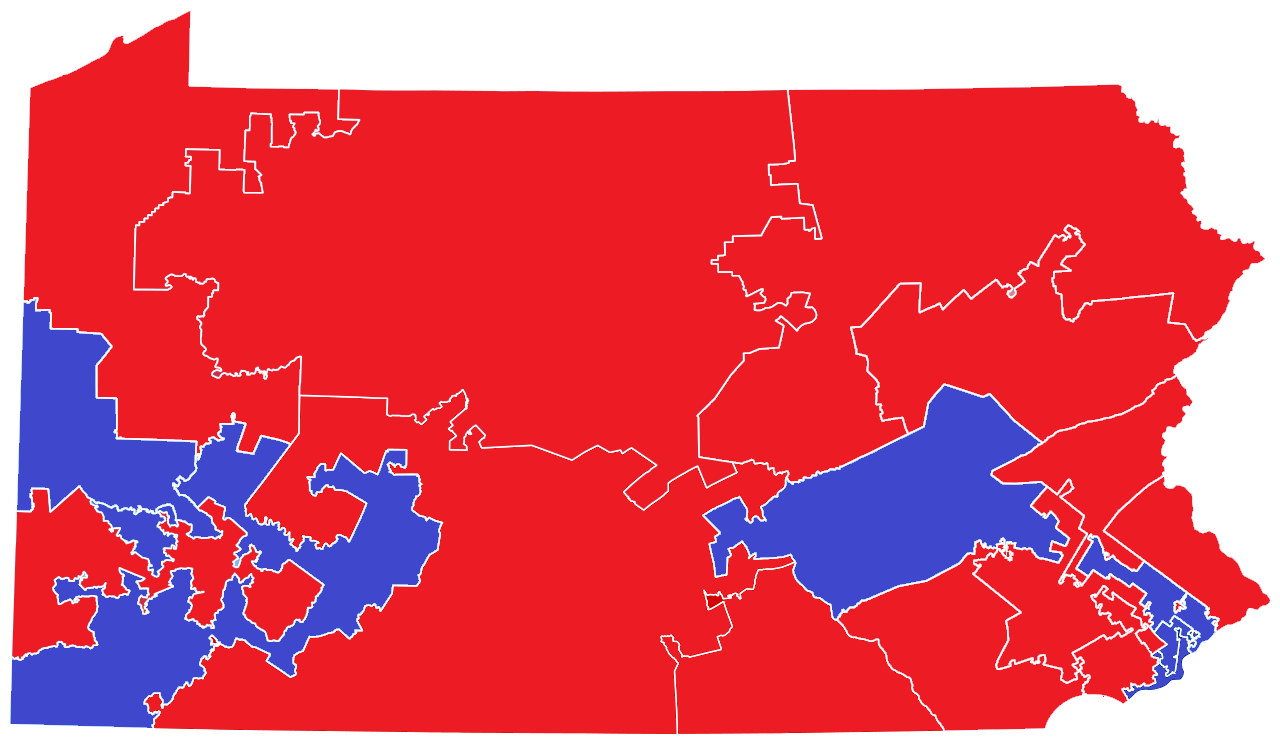
2010

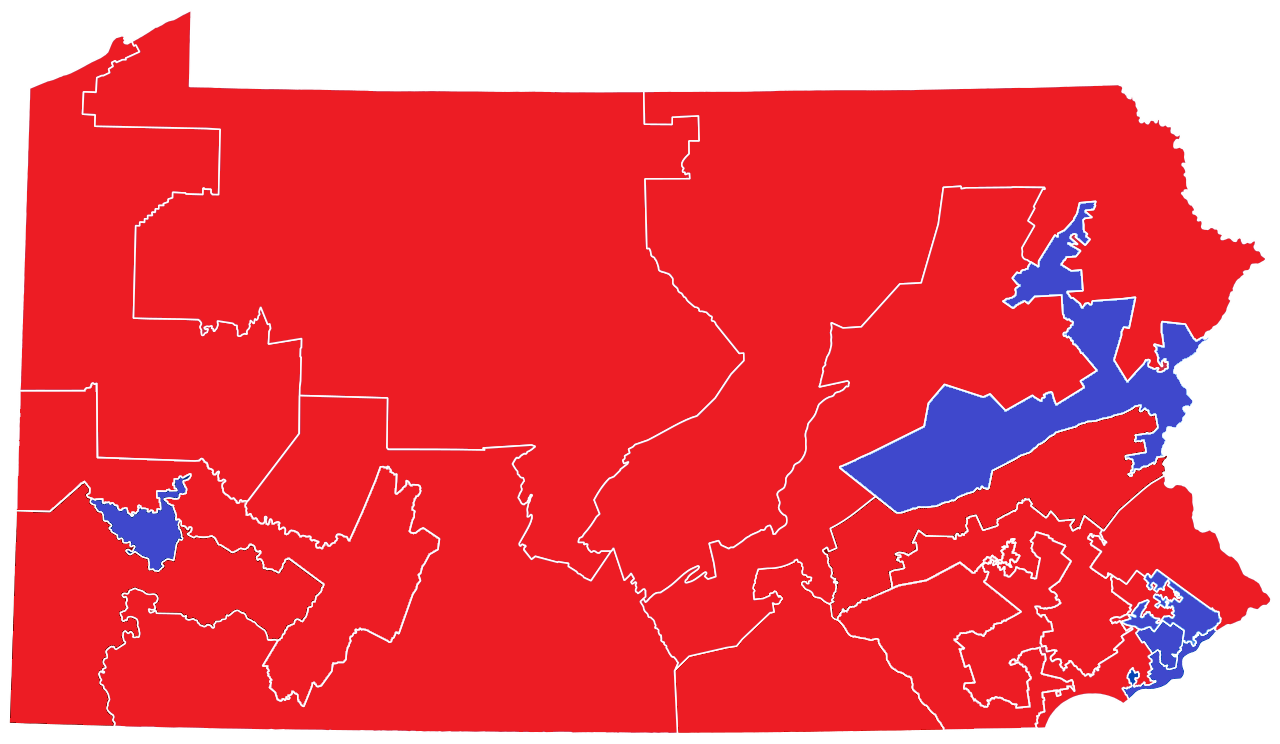
2012

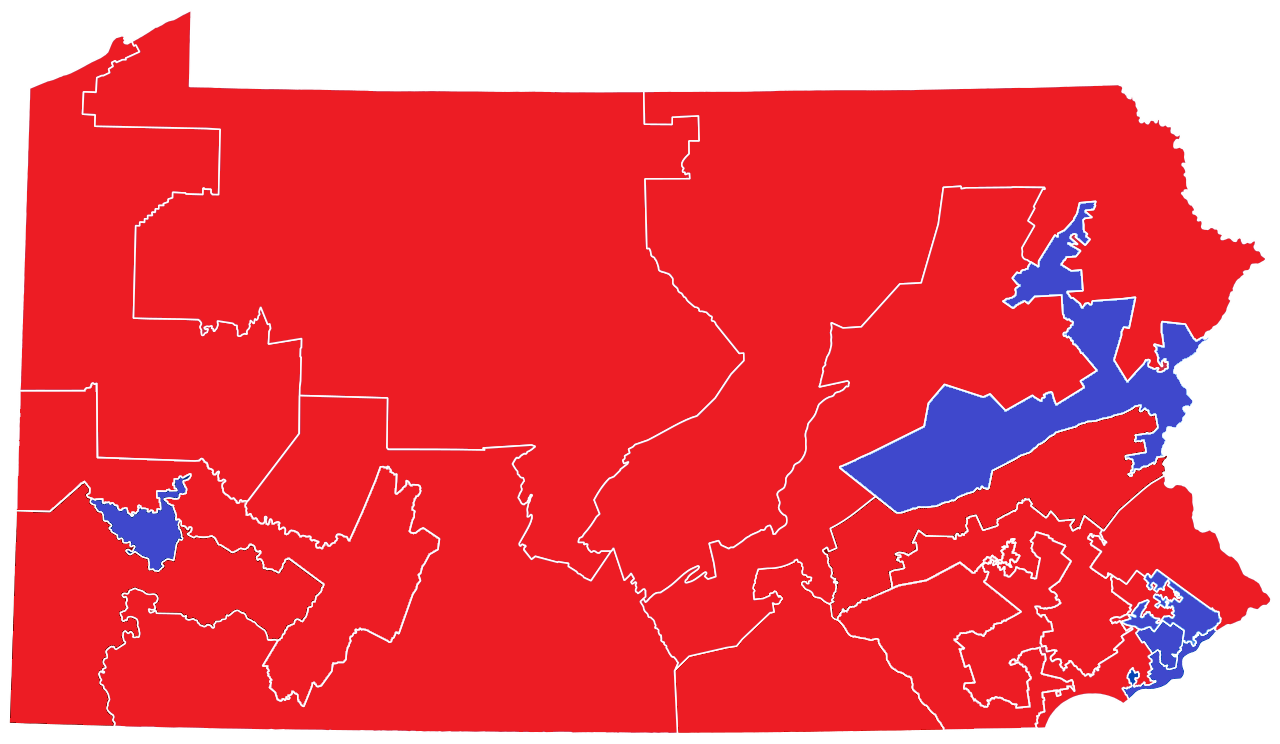
2014

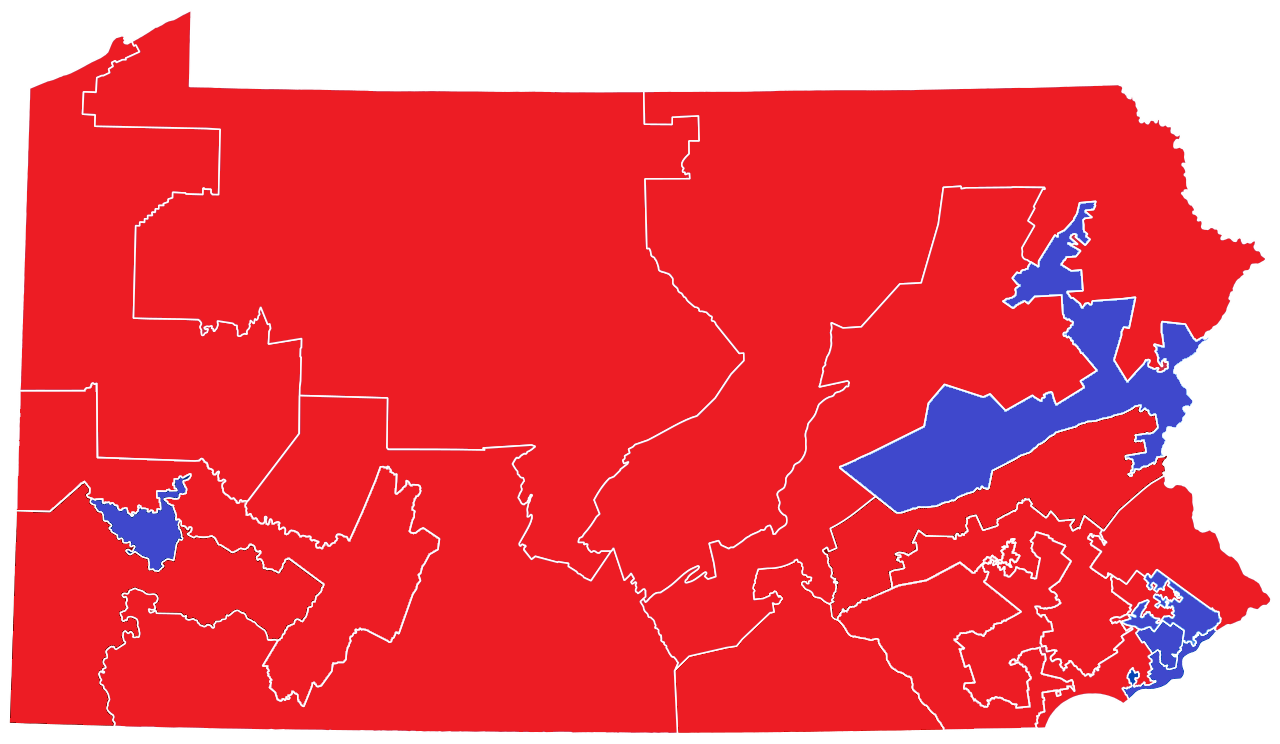
2016

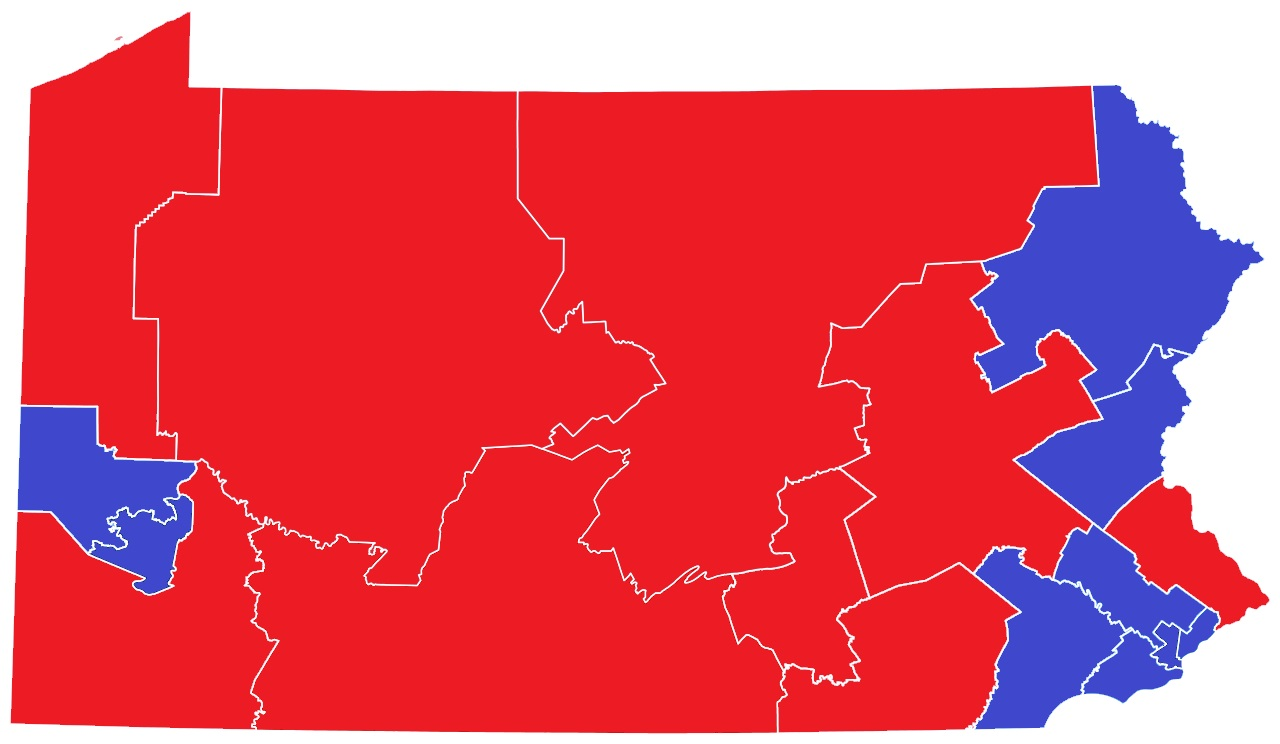
2018

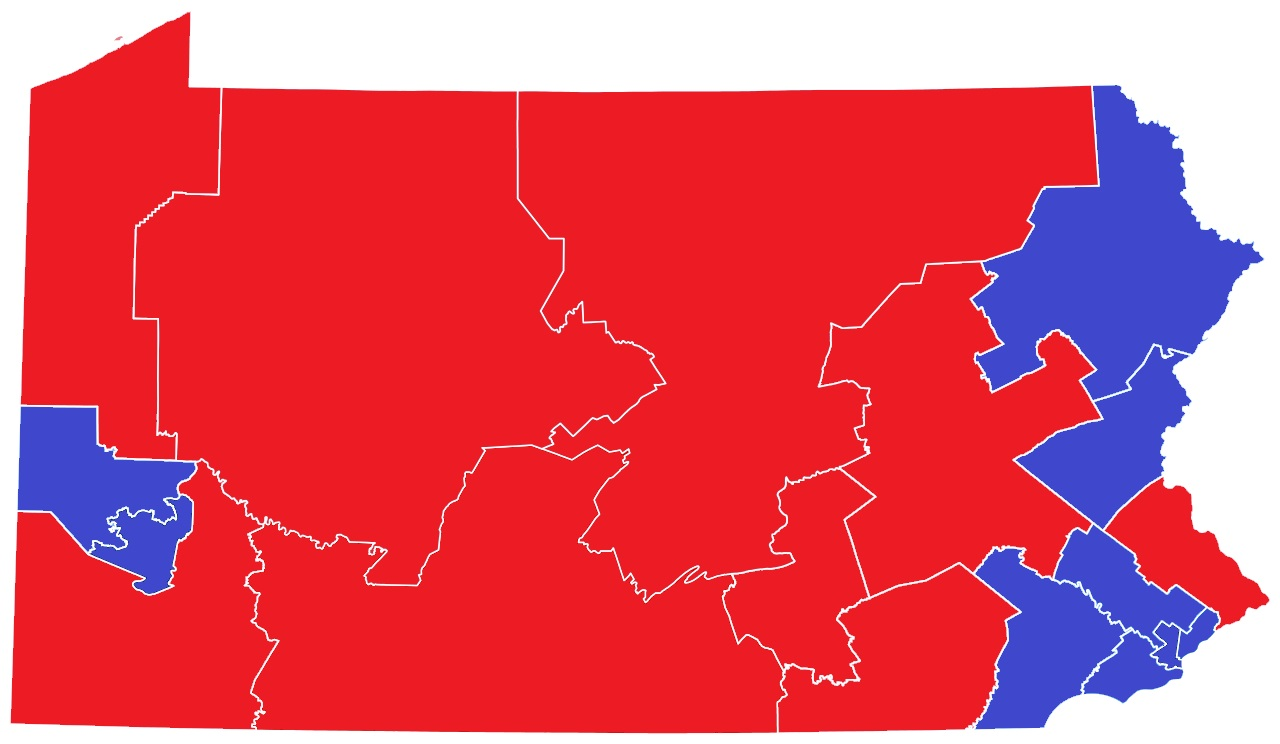
2020

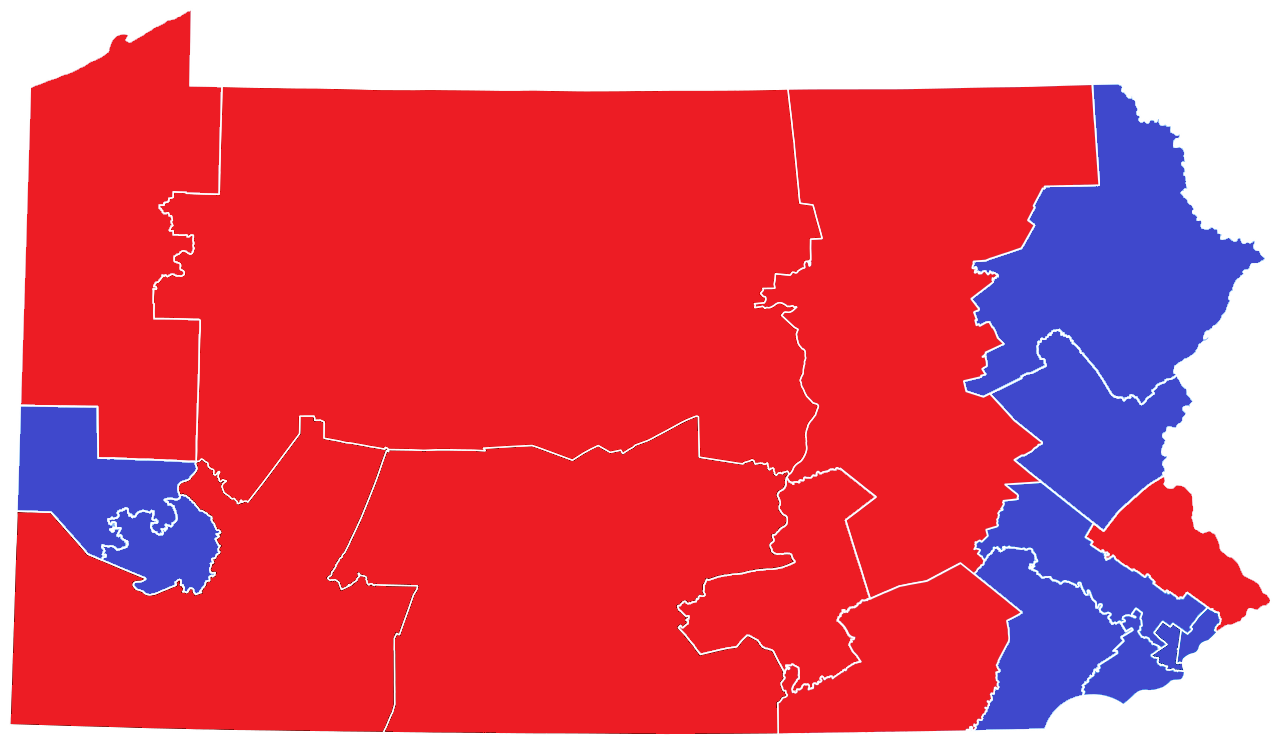
2022

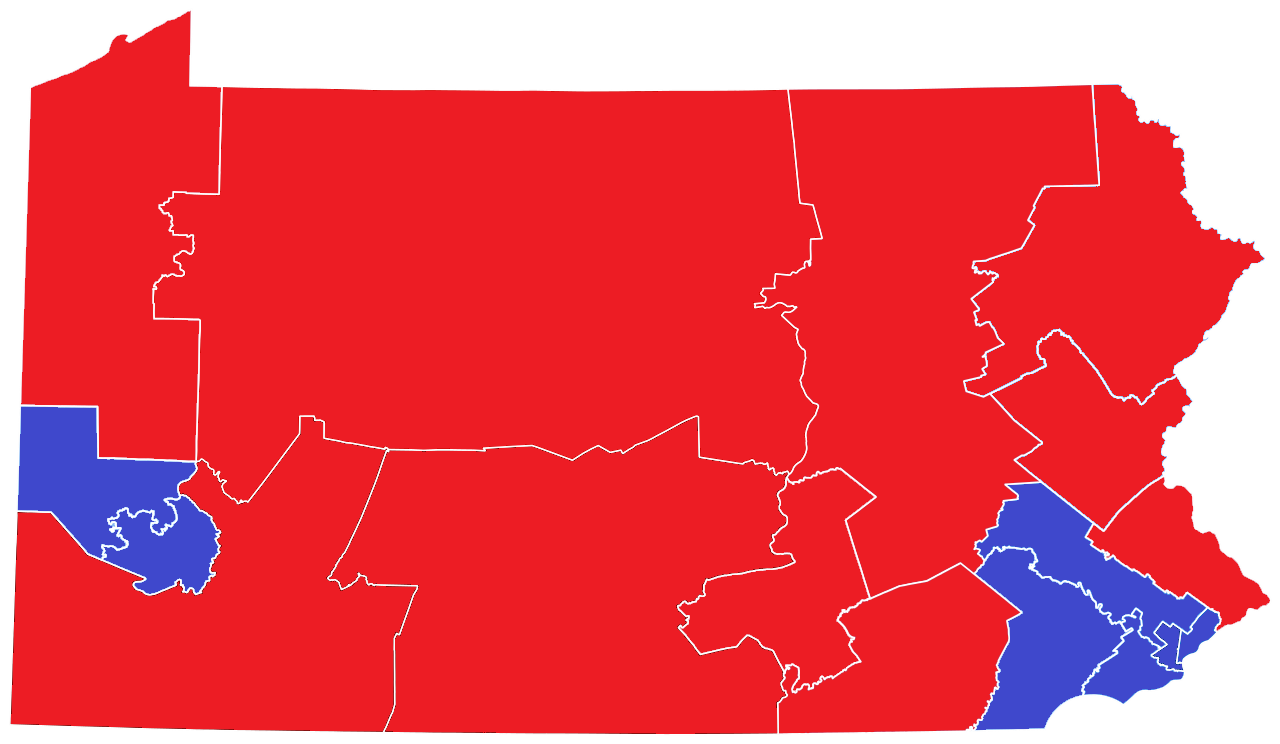
2024

== 2012 redistricting and gerrymandering challenge ==
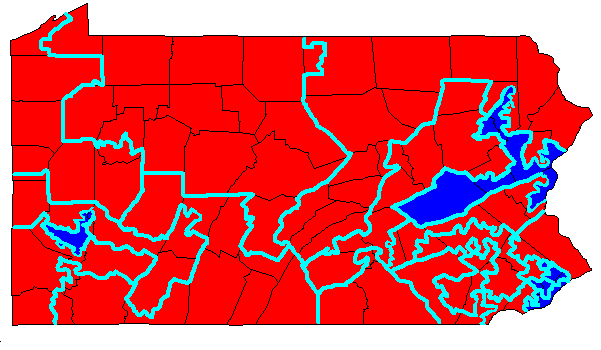
Delegation affiliation following 2012 elections: Red – Republicans (13) Blue – Democrats (5)

Following the 2010 census, redistricting in Pennsylvania was controlled by elected officials from the Republican party. In 2012, Pennsylvania realigned a number of districts. A number of sitting congressional representatives had their districts modified or merged as part of the redistricting. The merger of districts 4 and 12 forced a primary runoff between the two sitting congressional representatives.

The 2012 redistricting process resulted in a map that according to Democrats favored Republican candidates. Pennsylvania has voted majority Democrat in every presidential election since 1992, with the exception of Donald Trump's victories in the 2016 and 2024 elections. In the 2012 congressional elections, Democratic candidates won 50.5% of the total votes cast. However, only five of the state's 18 federal Representatives (27.78%) were Democrats.

On June 14, 2017, the League of Women Voters of Pennsylvania filed a lawsuit, alleging that the district boundaries constituted a partisan gerrymander, and that such a gerrymander was contrary to the Constitution of Pennsylvania. The case was eventually appealed to the Pennsylvania Supreme Court. On January 22, 2018, the Pennsylvania Supreme Court ruled that the congressional districts were unlawfully gerrymandered in violation of the Pennsylvania Constitution. The court ordered the General Assembly and the governor to adopt a remedied map, to be used for the 2018 congressional elections. Pennsylvania Republicans requested a stay from the United States Supreme Court, to delay the drawing of new district boundaries; however, that request was denied on February 5, 2018. The governor and General Assembly failed to reach an agreement regarding the district boundaries, thus the Pennsylvania Supreme Court drew its own remedial map.

On February 19, 2018, the Pennsylvania Supreme Court released its new congressional map, to take effect for the May 15, 2018, primaries. The Court voted to implement the new map by a 4–3 vote. The map was designed with the assistance of Stanford University law professor Nathaniel Persily. The districts in the Court's map were significantly more compact, and its map split fewer municipalities and counties than the prior Republican-drawn map. While the GOP-drawn map had favored Republican candidates, the court-drawn map is expected not to favor one party over the other.

Republican lawmakers from Pennsylvania requested that the Supreme Court block the implementation of the court-drawn map; however, on March 19, 2018, the United States Supreme Court denied their request. A Pennsylvania federal district court dismissed a parallel suit on the same day. Prior to the 2018 House elections, the Republicans had held 12 seats to 6 for the Democrats, and prior to the March 2018 special election in the 18th district, the delegation had consisted of 13 Republicans and 5 Democrats. The 2018 election resulted in 9 Democrats and 9 Republicans in the delegation.

== Historical district boundaries ==
Districts 2003–2013

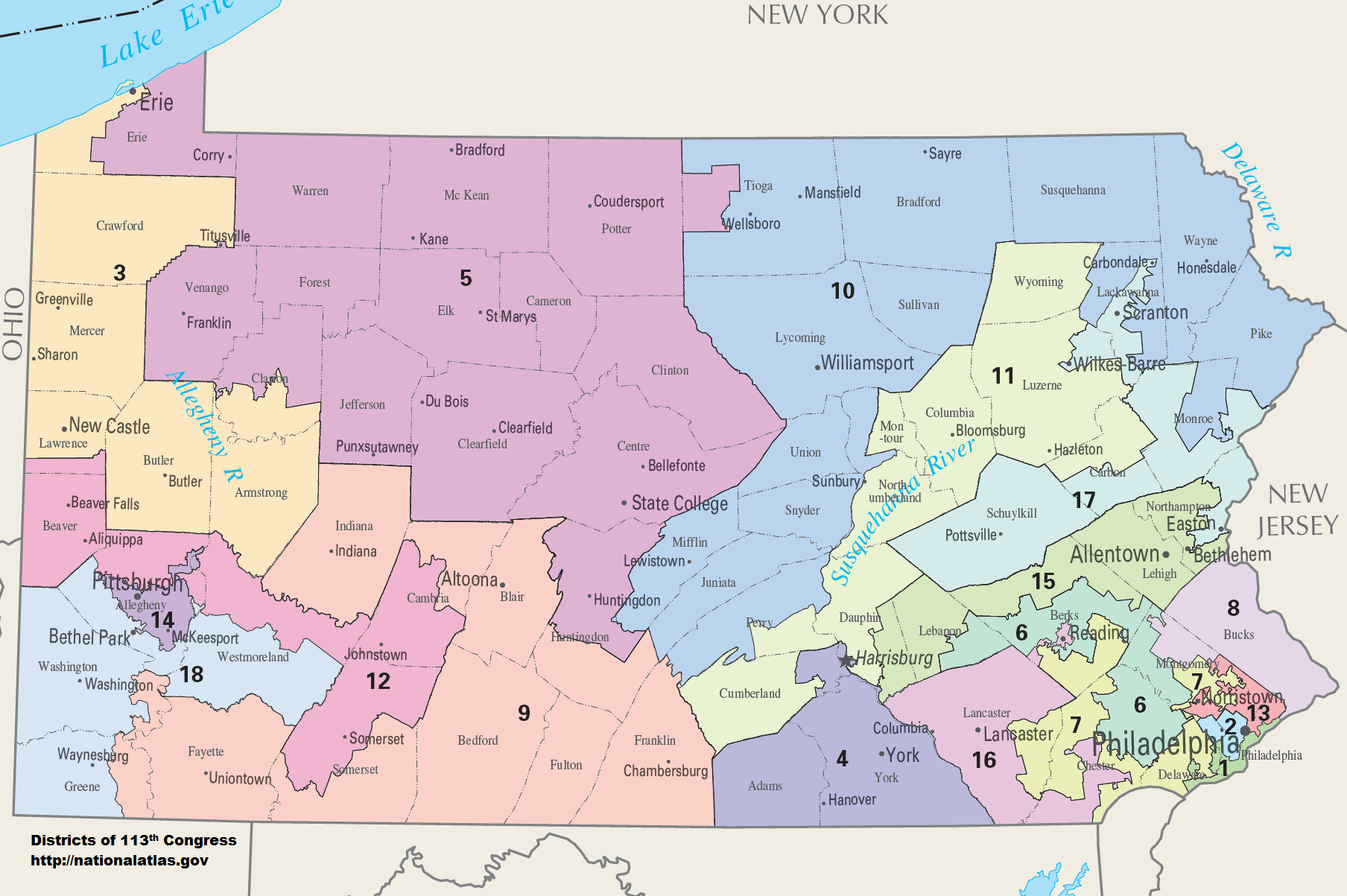
Districts 2013–2019

Districts 2019–2023

== See also ==
- List of United States congressional districts
