= Pennsylvania Route 247 =

State highway in Pennsylvania, US

Pennsylvania Route 247

Route information
- Maintained by PennDOT
- Length: 50.471 mi (81.225 km)

Major junctions
- South end: I-84 in Mount Cobb
- US 6 in Jessup; US 6 Bus. in Archbald; PA 438 in Montdale; PA 107 in Scott Township; PA 106 in Finch Hill; PA 171 in Forest City; PA 296 in Clinton Township; PA 170 in Creamton; PA 670 in Mount Pleasant Township; PA 371 in Mount Pleasant Township
- North end: PA 370 in Preston Park

Location
- Country: United States
- State: Pennsylvania
- Counties: Lackawanna, Susquehanna, Wayne

Highway system
- Pennsylvania State Route System; Interstate; US; State; Scenic; Legislative
| ← PA 246 | → PA 248 |

Pennsylvania Route 247 (PA 247) is a 50.5-mile-long (81.3 km) state highway located in Lackawanna, Susquehanna, and Wayne counties in Pennsylvania. The southern terminus is at Interstate 84 (I-84) in Mount Cobb. The northern terminus is at PA 370 in Preston Park. The route heads north from I-84 in Lackawanna County and crosses the Moosic Mountains before it heads into suburban areas northeast of Scranton, serving Jessup, Blakely, and Archbald. In this area, PA 247 has an interchange with the U.S. Route 6 (US 6) freeway in Jessup and intersects US 6 Business (US 6 Bus.) in Archbald. Past here, the route continues north into rural areas in northern Lackawanna County. PA 247 heads into the southeastern part of Susquehanna County and passes through Forest City, where it forms a short concurrency with PA 171. The route continues into Wayne County and heads east before curving to the north and continuing to its terminus at PA 370.

PA 247 was designated in 1928 between US 6 at Main Street in Blakely and an unnumbered road north of Rock Lake. The route followed its current alignment except between Montdale and Dundaff, where it ran further to the west along current PA 438, Jordan Hollow Road, PA 107, Worth Church Road, Creamery Road, and Airport Road. PA 147 was designated in 1928 between PA 247/PA 347 in Montdale and PA 247 in Dundaff. PA 248 was designated in the 1930s to run between PA 348 in Mount Cobb and US 6 at Main Street in Winton. PA 247 was extended north to PA 570 (now PA 370) in Preston Park in the 1930s. In the 1940s, PA 247 was realigned between Montdale and Dundaff to replace PA 147 and was extended south to PA 348 in Mount Cobb, replacing PA 248. The route was extended south to I-84 in 1976.

== Route description ==
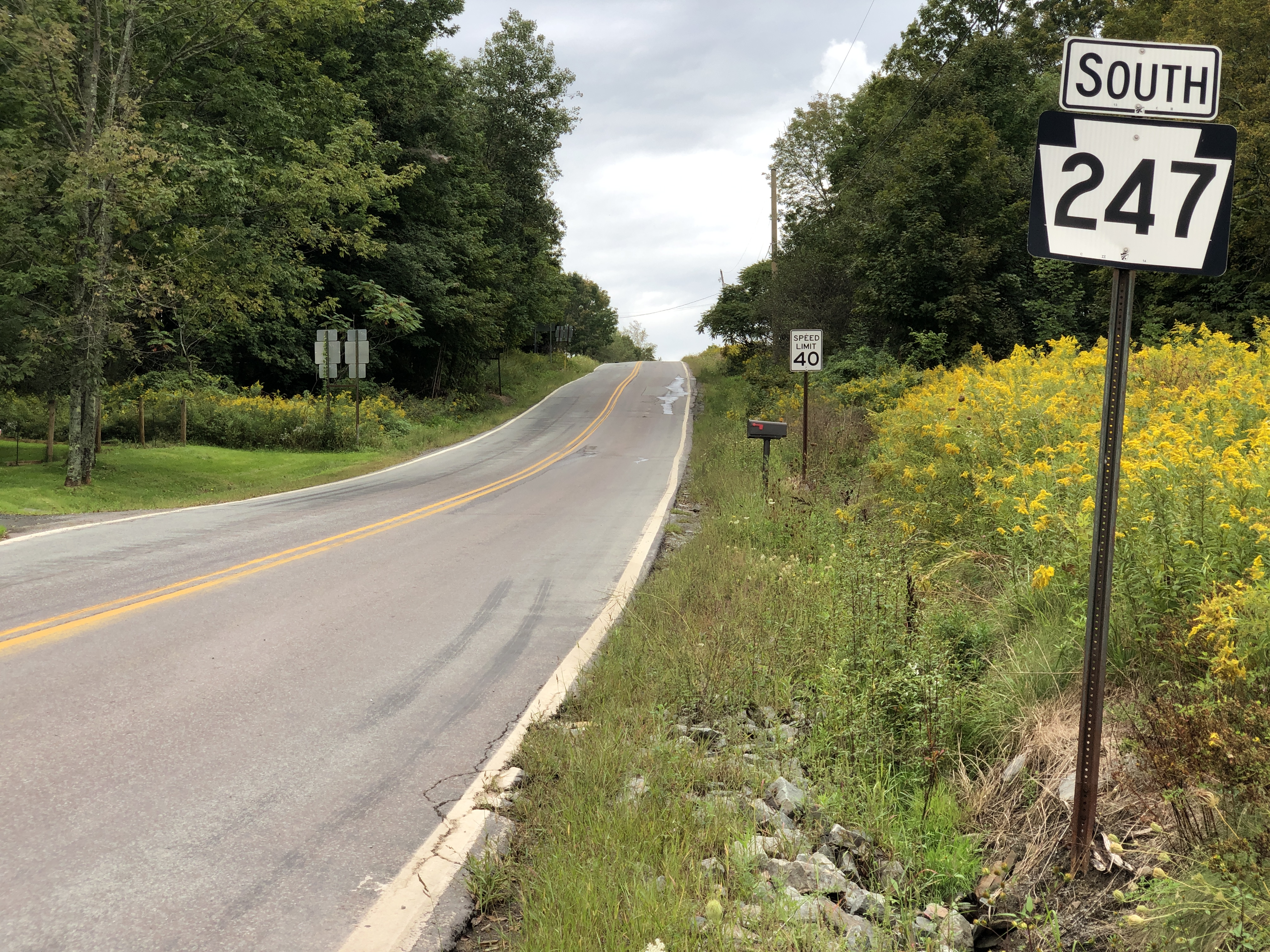
PA 247 southbound at PA 670 in Mount Pleasant Township

PA 247 begins at a diamond interchange with I-84 in Jefferson Township, Lackawanna County, heading north on a two-lane undivided road. The route heads west of a park and ride lot and passes businesses, coming to an intersection with PA 348. Following this, the roadway continues into forested areas with some homes. The road turns northwest and passes through Jefferson Heights before heading across the forested Moosic Mountains. Along this stretch, PA 247 crosses into the borough of Jessup, briefly heading through a portion of the borough of Olyphant before crossing back into Jessup. The road heads north and comes to a partial cloverleaf interchange with the US 6 freeway, becoming Moosic Lake Road and passing west of a park and ride lot. The name changes to Hill Street and PA 247 heads northwest past businesses. The route turns southwest onto Grassy Island Avenue and continues into residential areas, turning northwest onto Church Street. PA 247 briefly heads southwest on Front Street before resuming northwest on Church Street, passing more homes. The route heads through the commercial downtown of Jessup and crosses a Delaware-Lackawanna Railroad line at-grade, turning southwest onto Constitution Avenue for a short distance before continuing northwest onto Bridge Street. The road passes more homes prior to crossing the Lackawanna River into the borough of Blakely and becoming Depot Street. PA 247 turns west onto River Street and runs through more residential areas, turning north onto Keystone Avenue. The route curves to the northwest before turning northeast onto Gino Meril Drive. PA 247 heads north onto Wildcat Road and passes near homes with some businesses, crossing into the borough of Archbald. The road comes to an intersection with US 6 Business and heads into dense forests, turning northwest and entering Scott Township.

The route heads west through forested areas with some homes as an unnamed road, intersecting the eastern terminus of PA 632 and turning to the northwest. PA 247 heads through more rural areas with some residences, turning north onto Lakeland Drive and intersecting the eastern terminus of PA 438 in Montdale. The road heads through a mix of farmland and woodland with some homes, curving to the north-northeast and becoming an unnamed road. The route intersects PA 107 before crossing into Greenfield Township and passing through more rural areas. PA 247 heads through more agricultural areas with some woods and residences, passing through Spencers Corners before crossing PA 106 in Finch Hill. North of here, the road turns to the north and heads through more wooded areas with some homes to the west of Newton Lake. The route heads into Clifford Township in Susquehanna County and continues through more woodland with some fields and residences, turning to the southeast in Dundaff. PA 247 heads through more rural areas, passing to the northeast of Crystal Lake. At this point, the route crosses into Fell Township in Lackawanna County and heads through wooded areas of homes, turning to the northeast. PA 247 heads back into Clifford Township, Susquehanna County, and runs through farmland with some homes, turning to the southeast into a mix of farms and woods with some residences. The road curves to the east-northeast and heads through forested areas with a few homes, becoming Dundaff Street. The road enters the borough of Forest City and passes through residential areas, coming to an intersection with PA 171. Here, PA 247 turns south to form a concurrency with PA 171 on Main Street, passing through the commercial downtown. PA 247 splits from PA 171 by turning northeast onto Marion Street, heading into wooded areas.

PA 247 enters Clinton Township in Wayne County and becomes White Rock Drive, heading into the residential community of Browndale and turning to the north-northeast. The road continues through forested areas with occasional homes. The route heads east before turning southeast onto Belmont Turnpike, entering agricultural areas with some woods and residences. PA 247 intersects the northern terminus of PA 296, which continues south on Belmont Turnpike, and turns east onto Creamton Road. The road passes through more rural areas, turning northeast and intersecting PA 170 in Creamton. The route heads through more farmland and woodland with some homes, crossing into Mount Pleasant Township and intersecting PA 670. PA 247 heads through more rural areas and curves more to the north, coming to an intersection with PA 371. At this point, the route forms a short concurrency with PA 371 before that route splits to the east in Niagara. The road continues north through more wooded areas with some farmland and residences, passing through Rudes Corner and Rock Lake. PA 247 heads into Preston Township and winds to the northeast, becoming White Rock Drive. The road enters Buckingham Township and turns to the northwest, crossing back into Preston Township. The route passes through another corner of Buckingham Township prior to heading into Preston Township again and passing through the community of Lake Como. PA 247 winds through forested areas near Lower Twin Lake and Upper Twin Lake, ending at an intersection with PA 370 near Preston Park.

== History ==
The portion of PA 247 along the Belmont Turnpike near the northern terminus of PA 296 follows part of the alignment of the Belmont and Easton Turnpike, a turnpike that was chartered on March 15, 1812 to run along the North and South road between the Easton and Wilkes-Barre Turnpike in Northampton County and the community of Belmont in Mount Pleasant Township, Wayne County. The turnpike was completed in 1819-1820. The Belmont and Easton Turnpike was used to transport cattle and sheep from Western New York to Easton and Philadelphia. The turnpike saw heavy traffic in its early days but traffic would decline with the rise of the railroads and other roads. When Pennsylvania legislated routes in 1911, what would become PA 247 between Clifford and Forest City was designated as Legislative Route 296.

Pennsylvania Route 147
- Location: Montdale–Dundaff
- Existed: 1928–1940s

Pennsylvania Route 248
- Location: Mount Cobb–Winton
- Existed: 1930s–1940s

PA 247 was designated in 1928 to run from US 6 (Main Street) in Blakely north to an unnumbered road (present-day T682) north of Rock Lake. The route followed its current alignment to Montdale before it continued northwest along present-day PA 438 and Jordan Hollow Road to PA 107. Here, PA 247 turned east briefly on PA 107 prior to heading north on Worth Church Road and east on Creamery Road, bending back north again. The route curved east and became Airport Road, picking up its current alignment again and continuing to north of Rock Lake. At this time, the section of PA 247 between Blakely and Montdale was paved while the remainder was unpaved. PA 147 was designated in 1928 to run from PA 247/PA 347 in Montdale north to PA 247 in Dundaff along an unpaved road. By 1930, PA 247 was paved between Montdale and northwest of Scott and to the east of Whites Valley while a section along Jordan Hollow Road was under construction. Also by 1930, PA 147 was paved between US 106 (now PA 106) and the border of Lackawanna and Susquehanna counties and was under construction between PA 247 in Montdale and US 106. By this time, the road between Mount Cobb and Jessup was an unnumbered, unpaved road.

In the 1930s, PA 247 was extended north to PA 570 (now PA 370) near Preston Park while PA 248 was designated to run from PA 348 in Mount Cobb north to US 6 (Main Street) in Winton. The entire length of both PA 147 and PA 247 were paved during the 1930s. PA 247 was realigned to its current route between Montdale and Dundaff in the 1940s, replacing the entire length of PA 147; the former alignment of PA 247 that ran further to the west became unnumbered. In addition, the route was extended south from Blakely to PA 348 in Mount Cobb, replacing the entire length of PA 248. In 1976, the south end of PA 247 was extended to an interchange with I-84.

== Major intersections ==
| County | Location | mi | km | Destinations | Notes |
|---|---|---|---|---|---|
| Lackawanna | Jefferson Township | 0.000 | 0.000 | I-84 – Milford, Scranton | I-84 exit 8; southern terminus |
| Lackawanna | Jefferson Township | 0.281 | 0.452 | PA 348 (Mt. Cobb Road) – Lake Ariel, South Canaan | |
| Lackawanna | Jessup | 5.396– 5.415 | 8.684– 8.715 | US 6 (Casey Highway) – Scranton, Carbondale | US 6 exit 3 |
| Lackawanna | Archbald | 9.190 | 14.790 | US 6 Bus. (Scranton-Carbondale Highway) | |
| Lackawanna | Scott Township | 11.327 | 18.229 | PA 632 west (Waverly Road) | Eastern terminus of PA 632 |
| Lackawanna | Scott Township | 12.618 | 20.307 | PA 438 west (Montdale Road) to I-81 | Eastern terminus of PA 438 |
| Lackawanna | Scott Township | 15.974 | 25.708 | PA 107 (Heart Lake Road) to I-81 – Fleetville, Jermyn | |
| Lackawanna | Greenfield Township | 18.814 | 30.278 | PA 106 – Clifford, Carbondale | |
| Susquehanna | Forest City | 27.184 | 43.748 | PA 171 north (Main Street) – Union Dale, Stillwater Dam | South end of PA 171 overlap |
| Susquehanna | Forest City | 27.573 | 44.374 | PA 171 south (Main Street) – Carbondale | North end of PA 171 overlap |
| Wayne | Clinton Township | 32.329 | 52.028 | PA 296 south (Belmont Turnpike) – Waymart | Northern terminus of PA 296 |
| Wayne | Clinton Township | 33.838 | 54.457 | PA 170 (Creek Drive) | |
| Wayne | Mount Pleasant Township | 35.790 | 57.598 | PA 670 (Bethany Turnpike) – Pleasant Mount, Honesdale | |
| Wayne | Mount Pleasant Township | 38.812 | 62.462 | PA 371 west (Great Bend Turnpike) | South end of PA 371 overlap |
| Wayne | Mount Pleasant Township | 38.954 | 62.690 | PA 371 east (Great Bend Turnpike) | North end of PA 371 overlap |
| Wayne | Preston Township | 50.471 | 81.225 | PA 370 (Crosstown Highway) | Northern terminus |
1.000 mi = 1.609 km; 1.000 km = 0.621 mi: Concurrency terminus
