= Pennsylvania Route 670 =

State highway in Wayne County, Pennsylvania, US

Pennsylvania Route 670

Route information
- Maintained by PennDOT
- Length: 21.264 mi (34.221 km)

Major junctions
- South end: PA 191 in Honesdale
- PA 247 in Mount Pleasant Township; PA 170 in Mount Pleasant Township; PA 371 in Mount Pleasant Township
- North end: PA 370 in Preston Township

Location
- Country: United States
- State: Pennsylvania
- Counties: Wayne

Highway system
- Pennsylvania State Route System; Interstate; US; State; Scenic; Legislative
← PA 669	→ PA 672

Pennsylvania Route 670 (PA 670) is a 21.26-mile-long (34.21 km) state highway located in Wayne County, Pennsylvania. The southern terminus is at PA 191 in Honesdale. The northern terminus is at PA 370 in Preston Township. The route is a two-lane undivided road that runs through rural areas in the northern part of Wayne County. PA 670 heads northwest from PA 191 and passes through Bethany. Farther northwest, the route crosses PA 247 and intersects the northern terminus of PA 170 before turning west to run concurrent with PA 371 in Pleasant Mount. PA 670 turns north from PA 371 and continues to its end at PA 370 in Orson.

The route follows the alignment of two turnpikes chartered in the 19th century. The southern portion of the route follows the Bethany and Honesdale Turnpike chartered in 1831 while the section north of Pleasant Mount follows the Belmont and Easton Turnpike, which continued south to Easton, which was chartered in 1812 and completed in 1820. The road in the Pleasant Mount area was designated as part of PA 170 in 1928. By 1930, PA 670 was designated between PA 170 (now PA 371) in Pleasant Mount and PA 370 in Orson. The route was extended southeast to PA 90 (now PA 191) north of Honesdale in the 1930s, replacing the section of PA 170 through Pleasant Mount.

== Route description ==
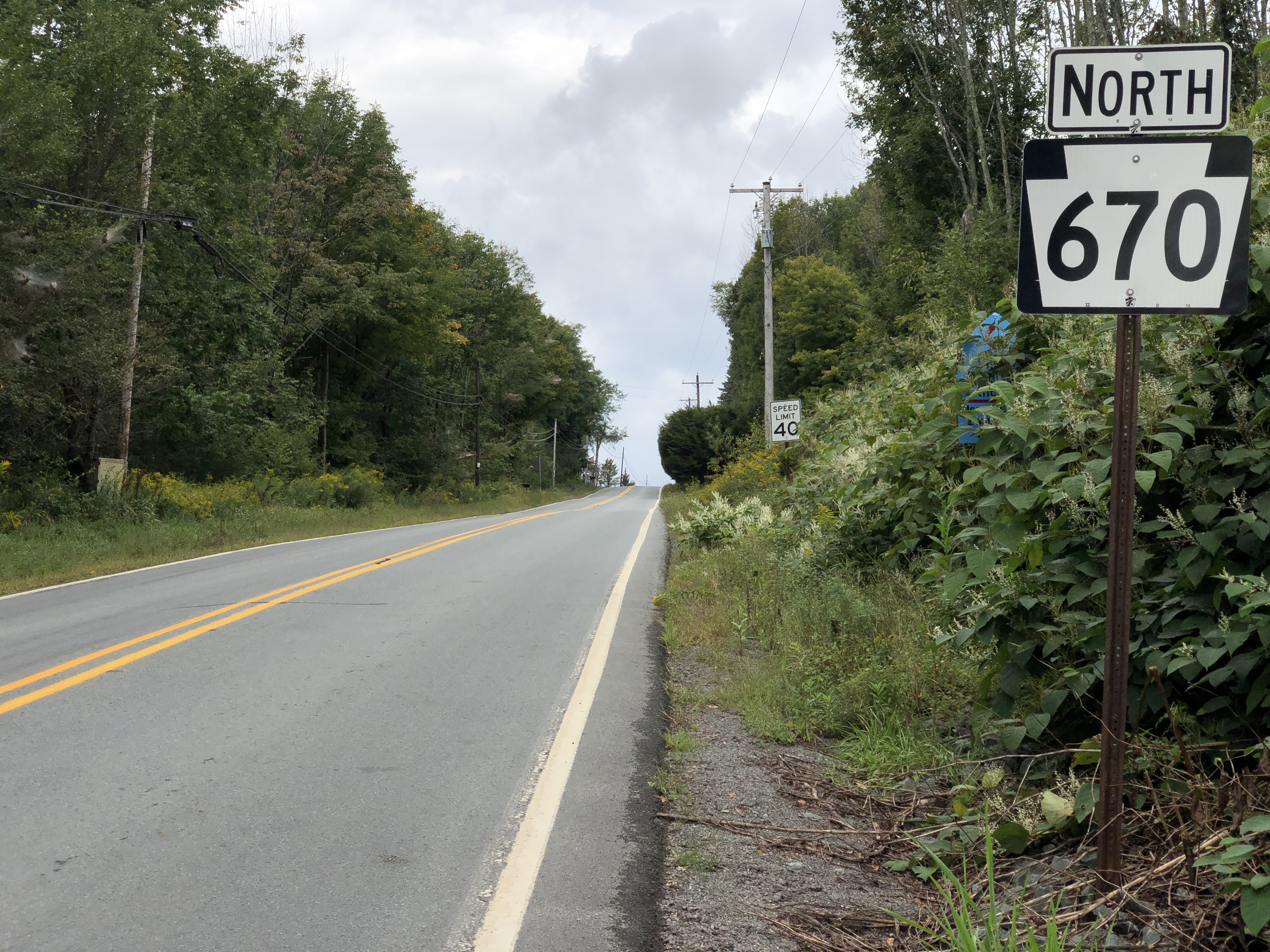
PA 670 northbound at PA 170 in Mount Pleasant Township

PA 670 begins at an intersection with PA 191 in the borough of Honesdale, heading northwest on two-lane undivided Elm Place. The road heads through wooded areas with some homes, crossing into Dyberry Township. Here, the route becomes Bethany Turnpike and continues through more wooded areas with some fields and residences, turning north. PA 670 enters the borough of Bethany, where it becomes Wayne Street and passes homes, turning northwest. The road heads back into Dyberry Township and becomes Bethany Turnpike again, heading north through woodland with some fields and residences. The route turns northwest and runs through more rural areas, crossing into Mount Pleasant Township and coming to an intersection with PA 247. PA 670 runs through more farmland and woodland with homes, passing through Whites Valley and intersecting the northern terminus of PA 170. The road continues northwest to an intersection with PA 371 in Pleasant Mount. At this point, PA 670 turns west to form a concurrency with PA 371 on Great Bend Turnpike, heading west through more rural areas. In Belmont Corner, PA 670 splits from PA 371 by turning north onto Belmont Turnpike, running through more farms and woods with residences. PA 670 continues northeast and north through more rural areas, entering Preston Township and ending at an intersection with PA 370 in Orson.

== History ==
The section of PA 670 north of PA 371 follows part of the alignment of the Belmont and Easton Turnpike, a turnpike that was chartered on March 15, 1812 to run along the North and South road between the Easton and Wilkes-Barre Turnpike in Northampton County and the community of Belmont in Mount Pleasant Township, Wayne County. The turnpike was completed in 1819-1820. The Belmont and Easton Turnpike was used to transport cattle and sheep from Western New York to Easton and Philadelphia. The turnpike saw heavy traffic in its early days but traffic would decline with the rise of the railroads and other roads. The southern portion of PA 670 was chartered as the Bethany and Honesdale Turnpike on March 25, 1831, connecting Bethany and Honesdale.

When Pennsylvania first legislated routes in 1911, what is now PA 670 was not given a number. In 1928, the present route between Honesdale and southeast of Pleasant Mount was an unnumbered paved road while the stretch southeast of and through Pleasant Mount was designated as part of PA 170. PA 670 was designated by 1930 to run from PA 170 (now PA 371) in Pleasant Mount north to PA 370 in Orson. At this time, the route was under construction. In the 1930s, PA 670 was extended southeast to PA 90 (now PA 191) north of Honesdale, replacing the stretch of PA 170 through Pleasant Mount. At this time, the entire length of the route was paved.

== Major intersections ==
The entire route is in Wayne County.

Location	mi	km	Destinations	Notes
Honesdale	0.000	0.000	PA 191 (Fair Avenue/Main Street)	Southern terminus
Mount Pleasant Township	9.069	14.595	PA 247 (Creamton Road) – Forest City, Lake Como	
Mount Pleasant Township	13.523	21.763	PA 170 south (Creek Road)	Northern terminus of PA 170
Mount Pleasant Township	14.839	23.881	PA 371 east (Great Bend Turnpike)	Southern end of concurrency with PA 371
Mount Pleasant Township	16.008	25.762	PA 371 west	Northern end of concurrency with PA 371
Preston Township	21.264	34.221	PA 370 (Crosstown Highway)	Northern terminus
1.000 mi = 1.609 km; 1.000 km = 0.621 mi: Concurrency terminus
