= Pennsylvania Route 371 =

State highway in Pennsylvania, US

Pennsylvania Route 371

Route information
- Maintained by PennDOT and JIBC
- Length: 23.541 mi (37.886 km)
- Existed: 1936–present

Major junctions
- West end: PA 171 / PA 374 near Union Dale
- PA 670 in Mount Pleasant Township; PA 247 in Niagara; PA 191 in Lebanon Township
- East end: CR 114 at the New York state line

Location
- Country: United States
- State: Pennsylvania
- Counties: Susquehanna, Wayne

Highway system
- Pennsylvania State Route System; Interstate; US; State; Scenic; Legislative
← PA 370	→ PA 372

Pennsylvania Route 371 (PA 371, designated by the Pennsylvania Department of Transportation as SR 0371) is a 23.5 mi (37.8 km) long state highway located in Susquehanna and Wayne Counties. The western terminus is at an intersection with PA 171 and PA 374 near the community of Union Dale in Herrick Center. The eastern terminus is at the New York state line in Damascus Township where it crosses the Delaware River on the Cochecton–Damascus Bridge. It continues into Sullivan County, New York, as County Route 114 (CR 114), which heads east toward New York State Route 97 (NY 97).

PA 371 originates as a road cut in 1791 and later used for the Newburgh and Cochecton Turnpike in 1806. The new turnpike was finished in 1811 and renamed as the Great Bend and Newburgh Turnpike in accordance for the extension to Great Bend, Pennsylvania. The turnpike was abandoned in 1853. PA 371 was originally designated along the turnpike route in 1936 by the Department of Highways from Great Bend to Damascus. The route remained intact until 1954, when the route was truncated back to PA 171 in Herrick Center. The route was replaced by PA 374 and PA 848 in 1961.

== Route description ==
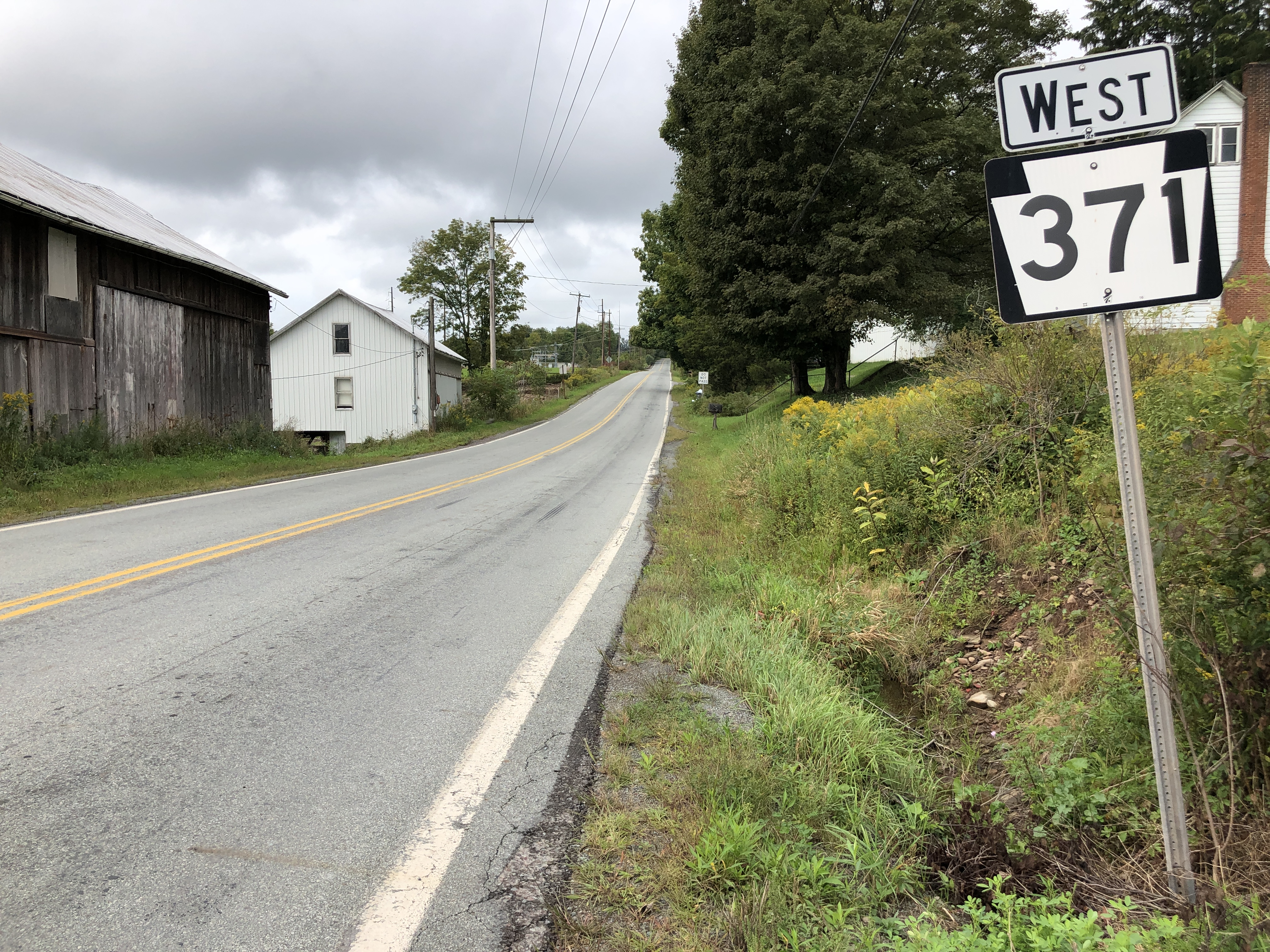
PA 371 westbound in West Damascus

PA 371 begins at an intersection with PA 171 and PA 374 in the community of Herrick Center. The route heads eastward, progressing through rural forests north of Union Dale. PA 371 begins in Susquehanna County, but just a short distance from Herricks Center, crosses into Wayne County. The route heads to the east, but soon begins to curve to the north, entering the community of Belmont Corners. PA 371 becomes known as the Great Bend Turnpike, leaving Belmont Corners at an intersection with PA 670 (Belmont Turnpike). At the intersection, PA 371 and PA 670 becomes concurrent for a distance. The routes head eastward through the forests in northern Wayne County. A short distance later, PA 371 and PA 670 enter the community of Pleasant Mount, where the alignment becomes surrounded by residences.

In Pleasant Mount, PA 371 and PA 670 head eastward as the main street in the community until a split at the eastern end of the community. There, PA 371 continues eastward along the Great Bend Turnpike while PA 670 forks to the southeast along the Bethany Turnpike. PA 371 heads eastward through fields until an intersection with "Crossroad", where it turns to the southeast towards the center of Mount Pleasant Township. The highway continues on the southeast pattern for a distance, past a large farm and into more forests nearby. At an intersection with Bush Road, PA 371 changes direction, heading to the northwest along the Turnpike. A short distance later, the highway heads through the rural farmlands until entering the community of Niagara. In the small community, the highway intersects with PA 247, where they start a short concurrency. The two routes head northward for a short distance, until PA 371 splits to the east.

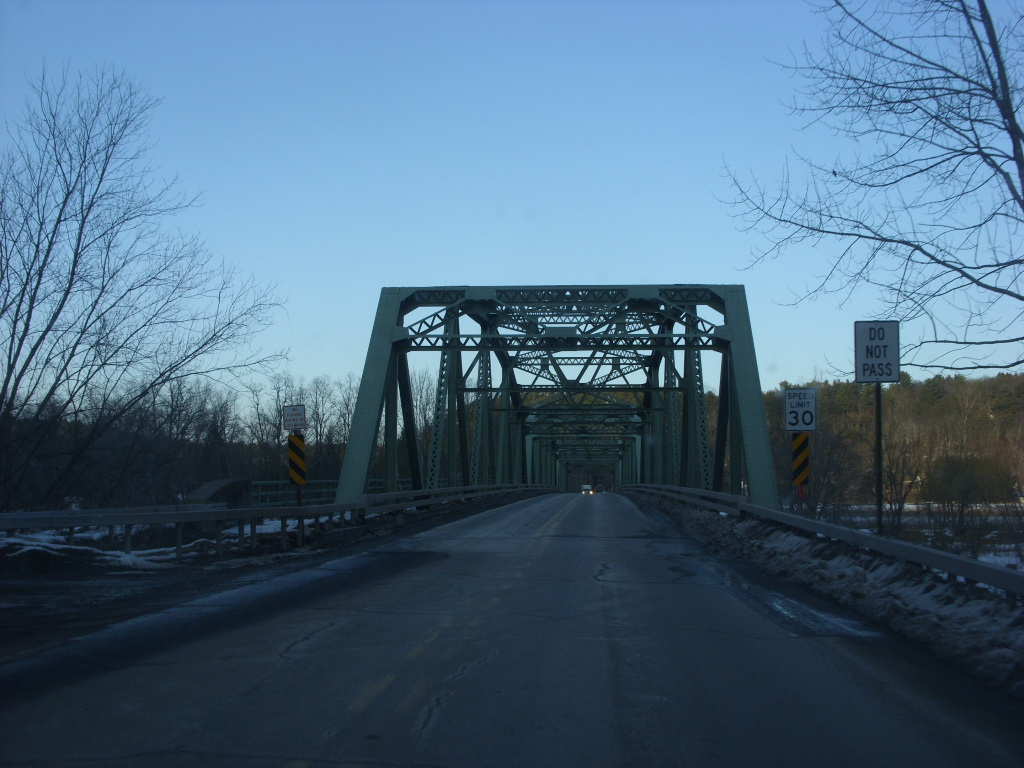
Cochecton–Damascus Bridge, the dividing line between PA 371 and Sullivan CR 114

PA 371 continues eastward through the rural regions, continuing its way through Mount Pleasant Township. The highway intersects with Township Road 613 (TR 613), where the highway makes a hairpin turn to the south. The route continues to the southeast into a denser portion of Lebanon Township. The route continues for a distance to the east until an intersection with TR 614 in the community of Cold Spring. In Cold Spring, PA 371 turns to the southeast through deep forests until an intersection with TR 612 and TR 617. There, the forests break, and the route continues to the southeast. A short distance later, PA 371 intersects with PA 191 (Hancock Highway) in the community of Rileyville. There, the route begins to follow the alignment of the Newburgh and Cochecton Turnpike. PA 371 continues through rural farmlands until a hairpin turn in the deep forests nearby.

After leaving the deep forests, the route re-emerges in Damascus Township's community of West Damascus. The route heads to the southeast even further into Fallsdale, where it passes two large ponds and several athletic fields. At the end of the eastern pond, PA 371 turns to the northeast crossing a creek and into the community of Tyler Hill. The route heads to the northeast through a small developed portion of the community before turning to the southeast and soon to the northeast again. The route continues to the northeast for a short distance before reaching the Delaware River, where PA 371 ends at the New York state line on the Cochecton–Damascus Bridge and continues into Sullivan County as CR 114.

== History ==
Records indicate that the alignment of PA 371 was first constructed as a cut from the Delaware River to the community of Great Bend, Pennsylvania, in 1791 through Wayne and Susquehanna Counties. In 1801, the state legislature of New York and Pennsylvania brought up the proposal for the Newburgh and Cochecton Turnpike (later the Great Bend and Newburgh Turnpike) to connect the Hudson River to the Delaware River. Although the route was finished in New York, the portion in Pennsylvania was not legislated until March 29, 1804. Construction through Wayne and Susquehanna Counties commenced in 1806, with completion of the roadway coming in 1811. At that point, the turnpike was extended onto the cut in Pennsylvania to the Susquehanna River. The turnpike was used for transportation of farmers' goods and stock along with a route for pioneers to use for heading westward. After construction of the original Cochecton–Damascus Bridge in 1817 (and later in 1821), the area around the bridge became a bustling community. The alignment of what is now PA 371 eventually became littered with a large rate of development, with nineteenth-century style buildings constructed in Damascus. The turnpike itself fared poorly later on, and was abandoned in 1853. Although the roadway itself was abandoned, the turnpike corporation that was supposed to maintain the roadway remained intact until 1868, when it was dissolved. Even afterwards, the roadway remained the only physical route in the area until at least the 1890s.

On August 14, 1992, the stretch of PA 371 from Galilee Road to the Delaware River was entered into the National Register of Historic Places as the Damascus Historic District. The record for the National Register included the roadway and forty different structures along the roadway for its historical significance.

Originally, a short portion of PA 371 was part of PA 170 in the 1928 mass numbering of state highways in Pennsylvania. 83 years after the abandonment of the Great Bend and Newburgh Turnpike (1936), the Pennsylvania Department of Highways took over the alignment of the highway for the designation of Legislative PA 371. The route at that point began at an intersection of U.S. Route 11 in Great Bend to the state line on the Delaware River in Damascus. The route remained intact along the turnpike for only eighteen years when in 1954, the Department of Highways truncated PA 371 back to the intersection with PA 171 in the community of Herrick Center. Seven years later, the Department of Highways designated both PA 374 on the alignment from Royal to Herrick Center and PA 848 from the community of New Milford (south of Great Bend) to Gibson.

== Major intersections ==
County	Location	mi	km	Destinations	Notes
Susquehanna	Herrick Township	0.000	0.000	PA 171 (Still Water Road) / PA 374 west (Old Newburg Turnpike)	Western terminus; eastern terminus of PA 374
Wayne	Mount Pleasant Township	1.329	2.139	PA 670 north (Belmont Turnpike)	West end of PA 670 overlap
Wayne	Mount Pleasant Township	2.498	4.020	PA 670 south (Bethany Turnpike)	East end of PA 670 overlap
Wayne	Mount Pleasant Township	7.302	11.751	PA 247 south (Creamton Road)	West end of PA 247 overlap
Wayne	Mount Pleasant Township	7.444	11.980	PA 247 north (Creamton Road) – Rock Lake, Lake Como	East end of PA 247 overlap
Wayne	Lebanon Township	14.280	22.981	PA 191 (Hancock Highway)	
Delaware River		23.541	37.886	Cochecton–Damascus Bridge	
Delaware River		23.541	37.886	To NY 97	Eastern terminus; access via CR 114
1.000 mi = 1.609 km; 1.000 km = 0.621 mi: Concurrency terminus

== See also ==
- Pennsylvania Route 848
