= Rileyville, Pennsylvania =

Unincorporated community in Pennsylvania, US

- Village
- Village of Rileyville
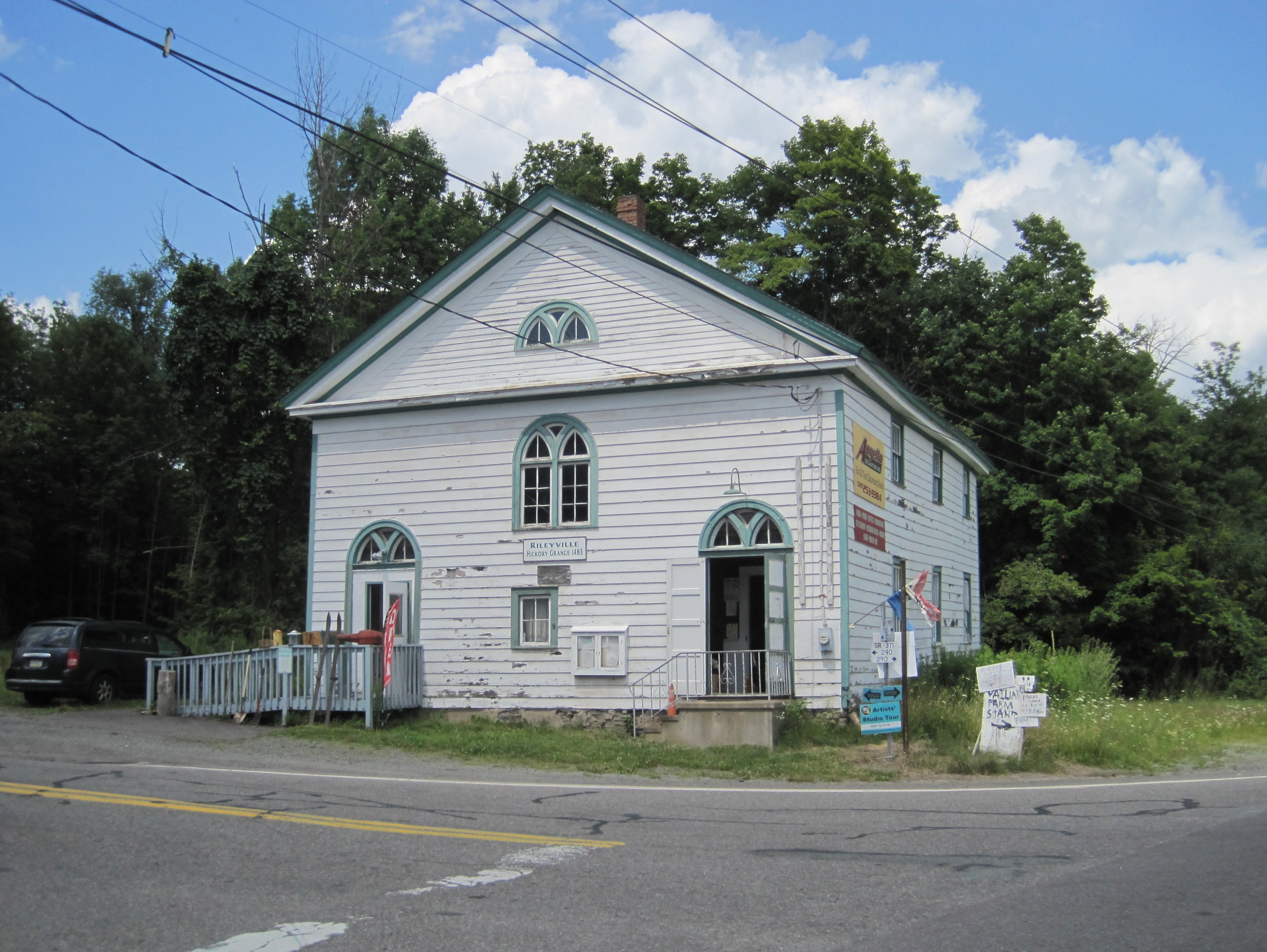
- Hickory Grange in Rileyville

- Rileyville's Location within Pennsylvania.
- Coordinates: 41°42′56″N 75°13′46″W
- Country: United States
- State: Pennsylvania
- U.S. Congressional District: PA-8
- School District: Wayne Highlands; Region II
- County: Wayne
- Magisterial District: 22-3-04
- Township: Lebanon
- Elevation: 1,611 ft (491 m)
- Time zone: UTC-5 (Eastern (EST))
  - Summer (DST): UTC-4 (Eastern Daylight (EDT))
- ZIP code: De jure None De facto 18431 (Honesdale)
- Area code: 570
- GNIS feature ID: 1204511
- FIPS code: 42-127-42176-64884

Rileyville is a village in Lebanon Township, Wayne County, Pennsylvania, United States. It is located at the intersection of Route 191 and Route 371. The mailing city address for the area is Honesdale, a borough and the county seat directly south of Rileyville.
