= Pennsylvania Route 370 =

State highway in Pennsylvania, US

Pennsylvania Route 370
- Crosstown Highway

Route information
- Maintained by PennDOT
- Length: 16.733 mi (26.929 km)
- Existed: 1946–present

Major junctions
- West end: PA 171 in Ararat Township
- PA 670 in Preston Township; PA 247 in Preston Township
- East end: PA 191 in Buckingham Township

Location
- Country: United States
- State: Pennsylvania
- Counties: Susquehanna, Wayne

Highway system
- Pennsylvania State Route System; Interstate; US; State; Scenic; Legislative
← PA 368	→ PA 371

Pennsylvania Route 370 (PA 370, designated by the Pennsylvania Department of Transportation as SR 370) is a 16.73-mile-long (26.92 km) state highway located in Susquehanna and Wayne counties in Pennsylvania. The western terminus is at PA 171 in East Ararat. The eastern terminus is at PA 191 in Buckingham Township near Hancock, New York. PA 370 was first designated by the Pennsylvania Department of Highways in 1928 from the intersection with then PA 70 in East Ararat to an intersection with PA 570 in the hamlet of Preston Park (in Preston Township). The route was extended to an intersection with PA 90 (now PA 191) in 1946, when the 23-mile-long (37 km) PA 570 was decommissioned.

== Route description ==
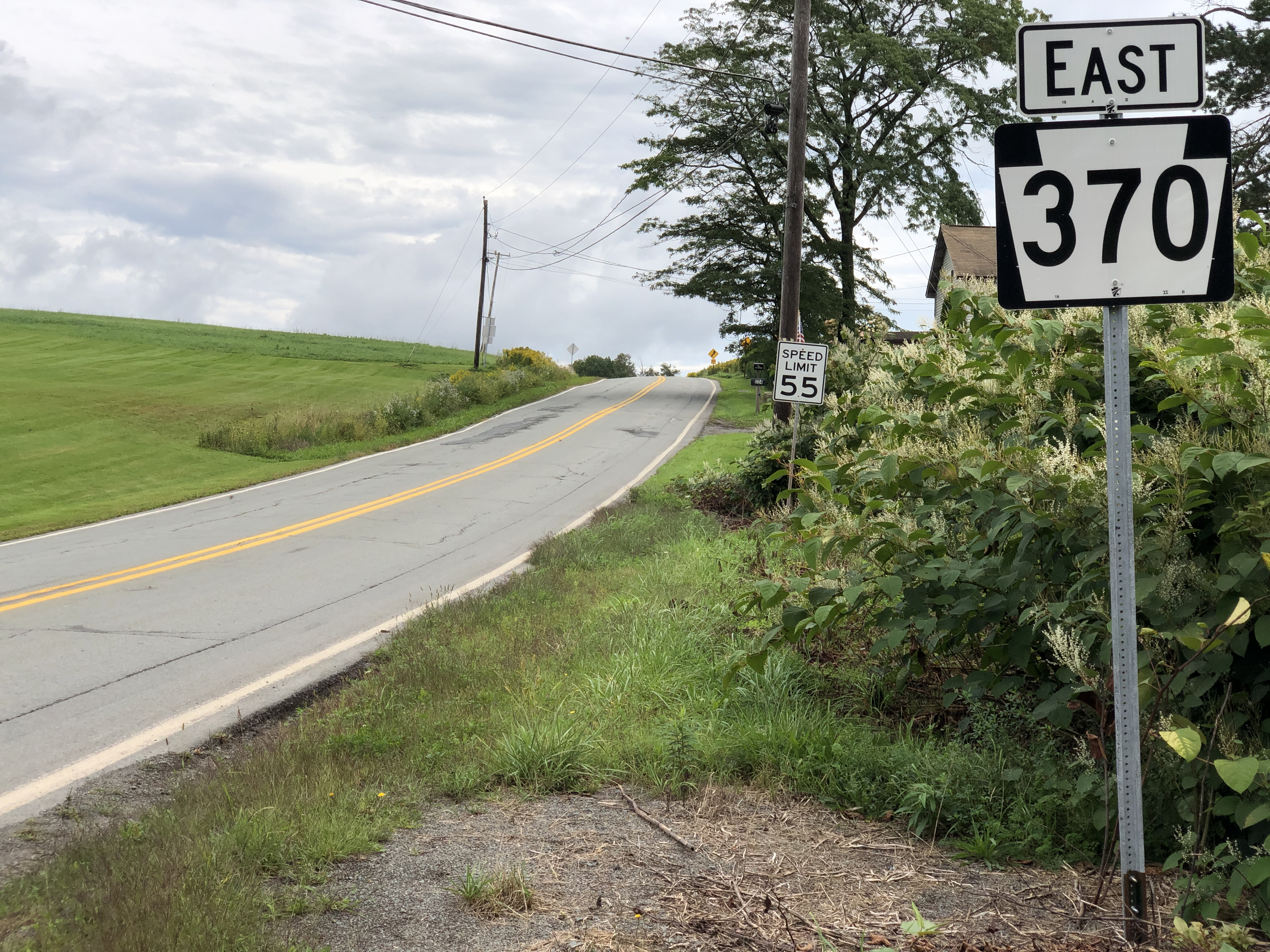
PA 370 eastbound at PA 670 in Preston Township

PA 370 begins at an intersection with PA 171 in the hamlet of East Ararat in Ararat Township. PA 370 heads to the northeast through tree patches and fields before entering a dense patch of woods. Upon leaving the woods, PA 370 crosses the county line from Susquehanna County to Wayne County and enters Preston Township. At the intersection with Mud Pond Road, the highway bends eastward but returns to its northeastern progression at an intersection with Blewett Road. PA 370 turns to the east once again and enters the community of Orson.

In Orson, PA 370 passes local farms and some houses. Shortly after it intersects with the northern terminus of PA 670 (Belmont Turnpike North), which continues north as Oxbow Road. PA 370 continues eastward out of Orson, passing Orson Pond and several residences in a mainly rural area before entering the hamlet of Poyntelle. In Poyntelle, the highway passes to the north of Lake Lorain and Lake Lorain Golf Course. At the intersection with Lake Lorain Road, PA 370 turns to the northeast once again, paralleling Cribbs Road into downtown Poyntelle. The two roads cross a former alignment of the Ontario and Western Railroad before merging just north of Poyntelle.

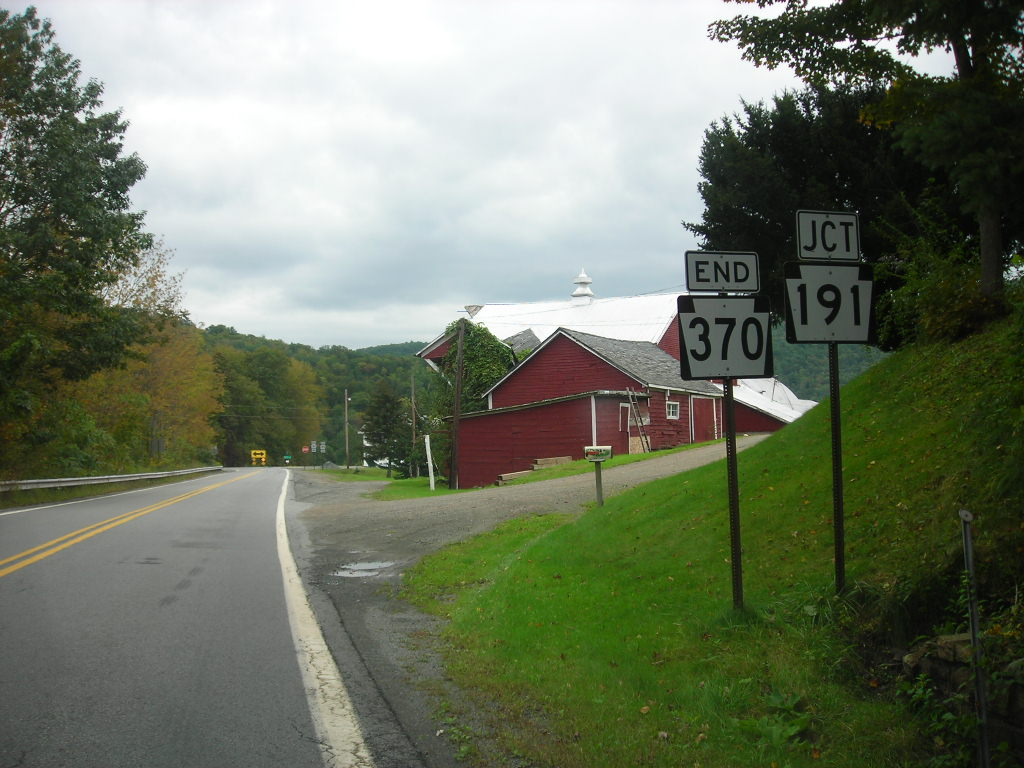
PA 370 heading eastbound its northernmost terminus at PA 191 in Buckingham Township

After Cribbs Road, PA 370 turns northward, entering Lakewood in dense woods. The route passes Little Hickory Lake and soon Hickory Lake. After entering the Tamarack Swamp and passing a local pond, PA 370 makes a gradual curve to the east at an intersection with Dixie Highway. The route remains rural, paralleling the Ontario and Western Railroad alignment into the hamlet of Tallmanville. In Tallmanville, the route is primarily residential, passing the local school. At the intersection with Como Road, PA 370 turns to the northeast, paralleling the railroad alignment into the hamlet of Preston Park.

Through Preston Park, PA 370 intersects with an old alignment of itself twice before coming to the main intersection in town, the northern terminus of PA 247 (Creamton Drive) and its continuation Rabbit Run Road. The road turns northeastward and passes several residences before intersecting with Shehawken Road, where the road becomes mainly wooded once again. The route parallels an alignment of former PA 570 and the former Ontario and Western Railroad into Buckingham Township, where the route enters the hamlet of Starlight. In Starlight, PA 370 passes the former Ontario and Western station and turns eastward once the old alignment of PA 570 merges in. After passing a pond, the highway leaves Starlight and continues northeastward in dense forestry. A short while later, the route turns northward and weaves to an intersection with PA 191 (the Hancock Highway) in Buckingham Township. This serves as the northern terminus of PA 370.

== History ==
PA 370 was first signed along Crosstown Highway in 1928 from its current western terminus of PA 171 (then designated PA 70) in Ararat Township to an intersection with PA 570, another spur of PA 70 in the hamlet of Preston Park. The entire stretch was paved by the Pennsylvania Department of Highways in 1932. At that point, PA 570 used the current alignment from the intersection with Shehawken Road to the intersection with PA 90 (now PA 191). PA 570, along with PA 470 and PA 270 were decommissioned in 1946 by the Department of Highways, and PA 370 was extended along the alignment from Shehawken Road to PA 90. In 1961, the routes at PA 370's termini changed from PA 70 to PA 171 and from PA 90 to PA 191.

== Major intersections ==
County	Location	mi	km	Destinations	Notes
Susquehanna	Ararat Township	0.000	0.000	PA 171 – Forest City, Thompson	Western terminus of PA 370; hamlet of East Ararat
Wayne	Preston Township	2.777	4.469	PA 670 south (Belmont Turnpike North) – Pleasant Mount	Northern terminus of PA 670; community of Orson
Wayne	Preston Township	10.577	17.022	PA 247 south (Creamton Drive) – Lake Como	Northern terminus of PA 247; hamlet of Preston Park
Wayne	Buckingham Township	16.733	26.929	PA 191 (Hancock Highway) – Hancock, Honesdale	Eastern terminus of PA 370
1.000 mi = 1.609 km; 1.000 km = 0.621 mi

== See also ==
- Pennsylvania Route 170 - the other remaining spur of PA 70.
