= Stillwater Dam =

Stillwater Dam may refer to:

- Stillwater Dam (Maine), in Old Town, Penobscot County
- Stillwater Dam (Pennsylvania), in Susquehanna County
- Part of Stillwater Mill museum
