= Rileyville =

Rileyville may refer to:

- Rileyville, New Jersey
- Rileyville, Pennsylvania
- Rileyville, Virginia
