= Pennsylvania Route 170 =

State highway in Wayne County, Pennsylvania, US

Pennsylvania Route 170

Route information
- Maintained by PennDOT
- Length: 11.629 mi (18.715 km)
- Existed: 1928–present

Major junctions
- South end: US 6 in Prompton
- PA 247 in Clinton Township
- North end: PA 670 in Mount Pleasant Township

Location
- Country: United States
- State: Pennsylvania
- Counties: Wayne

Highway system
- Pennsylvania State Route System; Interstate; US; State; Scenic; Legislative
← PA 168	→ PA 171

Pennsylvania Route 170 (PA 170, designated by the Pennsylvania Department of Transportation as SR 170) is an 11.65-mile-long (18.75 km) state highway located in Wayne County in Pennsylvania. The southern terminus is at U.S. Route 6 (US 6) in Prompton. The northern terminus is at PA 670 near Mount Pleasant Township. The route was designated in 1928 by the Pennsylvania Department of Highways as a spur of PA 70, although did not intersect with PA 70. Route 70 was renumbered in 1961 to PA 171. It is currently one of three remaining spurs of PA 70, including PA 370 and PA 670.

== Route description ==
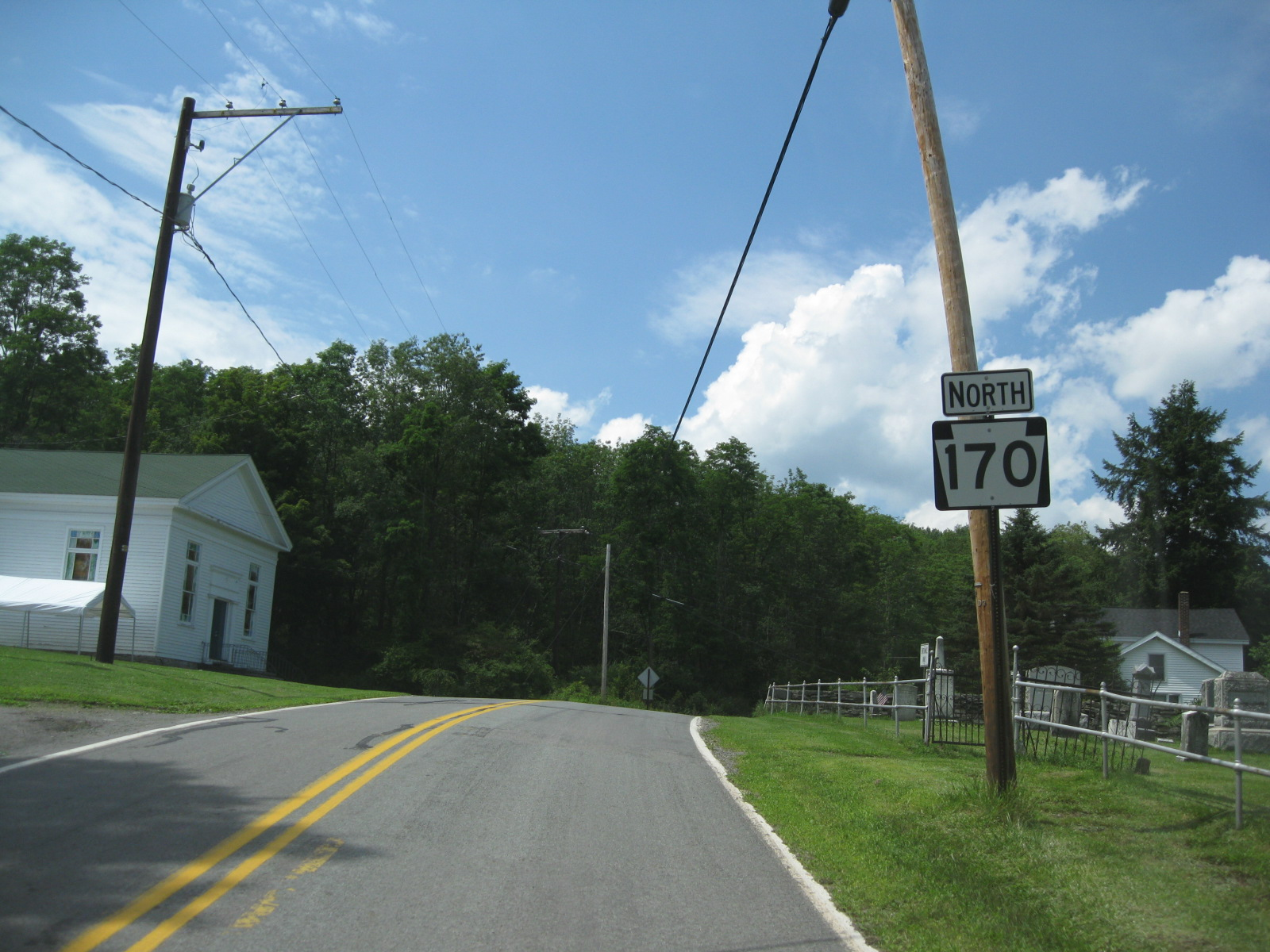
PA 170 heading northbound through the village of Aldenville

PA 170 begins at the intersection with US 6 (Roosevelt Highway / Grand Army of the Republic Highway) in the borough of Prompton. PA 170 heads northward as Creek Drive, heading uphill through forests before a clearing near Prompton Lake. Once the highway approaches the lake, it turns to the northwest to parallel the lake and the border into Prompton State Park. The surroundings remain wooded for a distance, paralleling the lake and some nearby homes. At the intersection with Lakeview Road, PA 170 turns from the northwest to the north as Prompton Lake dissipates into a creek. The road makes a second northwest turn and crosses the new creek close to the intersection with Beech Grove Road. After winding through forests, the highway returns to civilization entering the hamlet of Aldenville. PA 170 passes through downtown before turning northward back into the rural surroundings. The surroundings remain the same for several miles until the highway enters the hamlet of Creamton. In Creamton, PA 170, where it intersects with PA 247 (Creamton Drive).

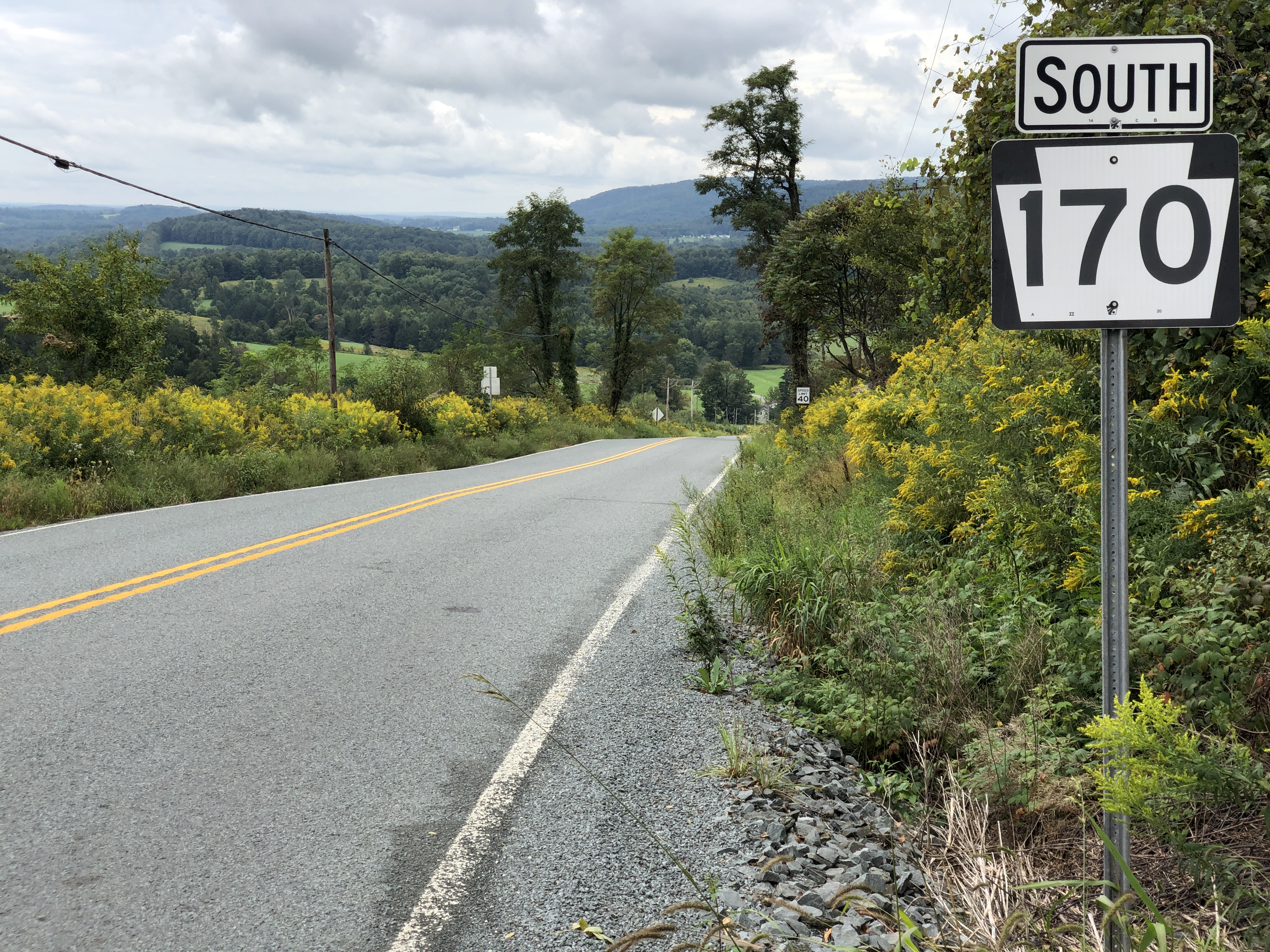
PA 170 southbound at PA 670 in Mount Pleasant Township

Continuing north from Creamton, the route turns to the northwest again, remaining rural for several miles. The route bends to the north, then northwest again. At a nearby home, PA 170 intersects with Sherwood Drive and McAvoy Road, where the highway and Creek Drive moniker turn to the northeast. After the intersection with Memorial Links Road, PA 170 leaves the forests for fields and intersects at a T with PA 670 (Bethany Turnpike) in now Mount Pleasant Township. At this intersection, the PA 170 designation terminates.

== History ==
The alignment that was designated PA 170 in 1928, as one of six spurs designated off of PA 70. At that time, only the portion from US 6 in Prompton to the hamlet of Aldenville was a paved highway. The stretch from Aldenville to the intersection with McAvoy Road was paved in 1939. Eight years later, PA 170 was paved from the intersection with McAvoy Road north to the terminus at PA 670. In 1961, PA 70 was re-designated as PA 171, though the x70 spurs retained their numbers.

== Major intersections ==
The entire route is in Wayne County.

Location	mi	km	Destinations	Notes
Prompton	0.000	0.000	US 6 (Roosevelt Highway / Grand Army of the Republic Highway)	Southern terminus of PA 170
Clinton Township	6.877	11.067	PA 247 (Creamton Road)	
Mount Pleasant Township	11.629	18.715	PA 670 (Bethany Turnpike)	Northern terminus of PA 170
1.000 mi = 1.609 km; 1.000 km = 0.621 mi

== See also ==
- Pennsylvania Route 171 - The parent highway formerly designated Route 70.
- Pennsylvania Route 370 - The other remaining spur of Route 70.
