= Prompton State Park =

State park in Wayne County, Pennsylvania

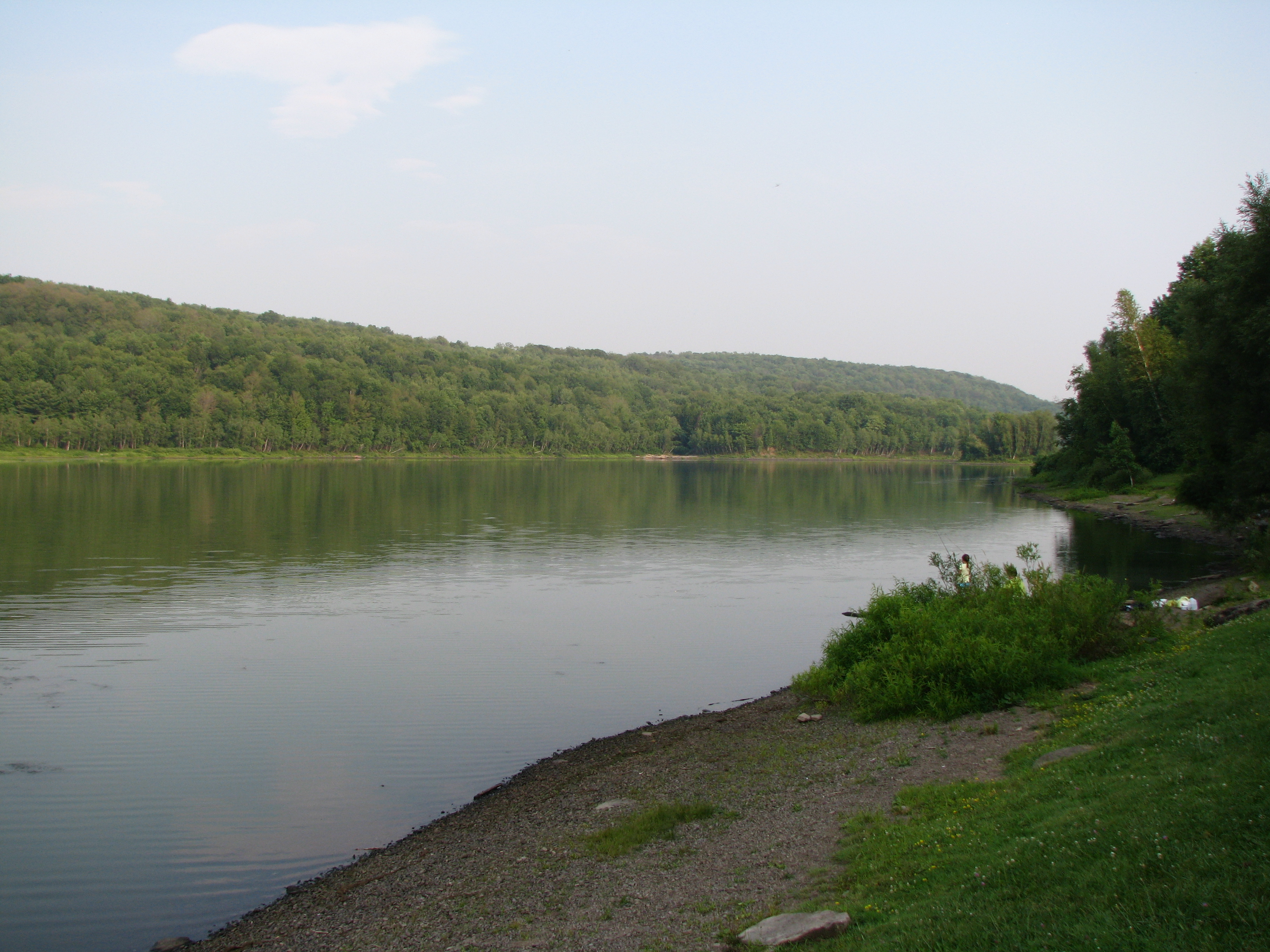

- Location within Pennsylvania Location within the United States
- Interactive map of Prompton State Park
- Location: Wayne County, Pennsylvania, United States
- Coordinates: 41°36′42″N 75°20′29″W
- Area: 949.3 acres (384.2 ha)
- Elevation: 1,289 feet (393 m)
- Established: 1962
- Administrator: Pennsylvania Department of Conservation and Natural Resources
- Website: Official website
- Pennsylvania State Parks

Prompton State Park is a Pennsylvania state park on 2,000 acres (809 ha) in Clinton and Dyberry Townships, Wayne County, Pennsylvania in the United States. This park, which was established in 1962, is officially listed by the Pennsylvania Department of Conservation and Natural Resources as being undeveloped. This means that it is officially a state park but the PA-DCNR is not currently managing the park. However, the lands of the park are open to visitors. Friends of Prompton State Park, a grassroots organization is working to take over management of the park in much the same way that Salt Springs State Park in Susquehanna County is managed by The Friends of Salt Springs Park. Northeast Sports Ltd. of Honesdale sponsors several outdoor sports events that are held at the park. Prompton State Park is 4.2 miles (6.8 km) west of Honesdale on Pennsylvania Route 170.

== History ==
In May 1942, heavy rains caused the Lackawaxen River and Dyberry Creek to rise rapidly. The record-breaking flooding in nearby Honesdale and Hawley claimed 29 lives and caused over $7 million damages. Following this flood, plans were made to control future flooding in the Lackawaxen River valley. Congress authorized funding in 1948 for the construction of two dams by the U.S. Army Corps of Engineers. In nearby Dyberry Township, Jadwin Dam was completed in 1959. In the following year, Prompton Dam was completed, which included a reservoir. The park was opened for public use in 1962.

== Recreation ==
Prompton State Park is open to visitors year-round. Activities available to the visitor include fishing, hiking, boating, picnicking, mountain biking, hunting, ice fishing, geocaching, sledding, cross-country skiing, and snowshoeing. The park closes at dusk, so the park and its lake are for day-use recreational activities only. There are no campgrounds on premise.

=== Disc Golf ===
The park also includes an 18-hole dual basket disc golf course. The course has multiple terrains, including moderate hills and lightly wooded areas. The disc golf course is located at the dam entrance at the south end of the park.

=== Boating ===
Small motorboats, up to 10 horsepower, are permitted on the 280-acre lake. Kayaks, canoes, rowboats, and other non-powered water-crafts are permitted on the lake. The boat launch is located on the west shore. It is accessible on route 170 2-miles (3.2 km) from the route 6 intersection.

=== Fishing and Hunting ===
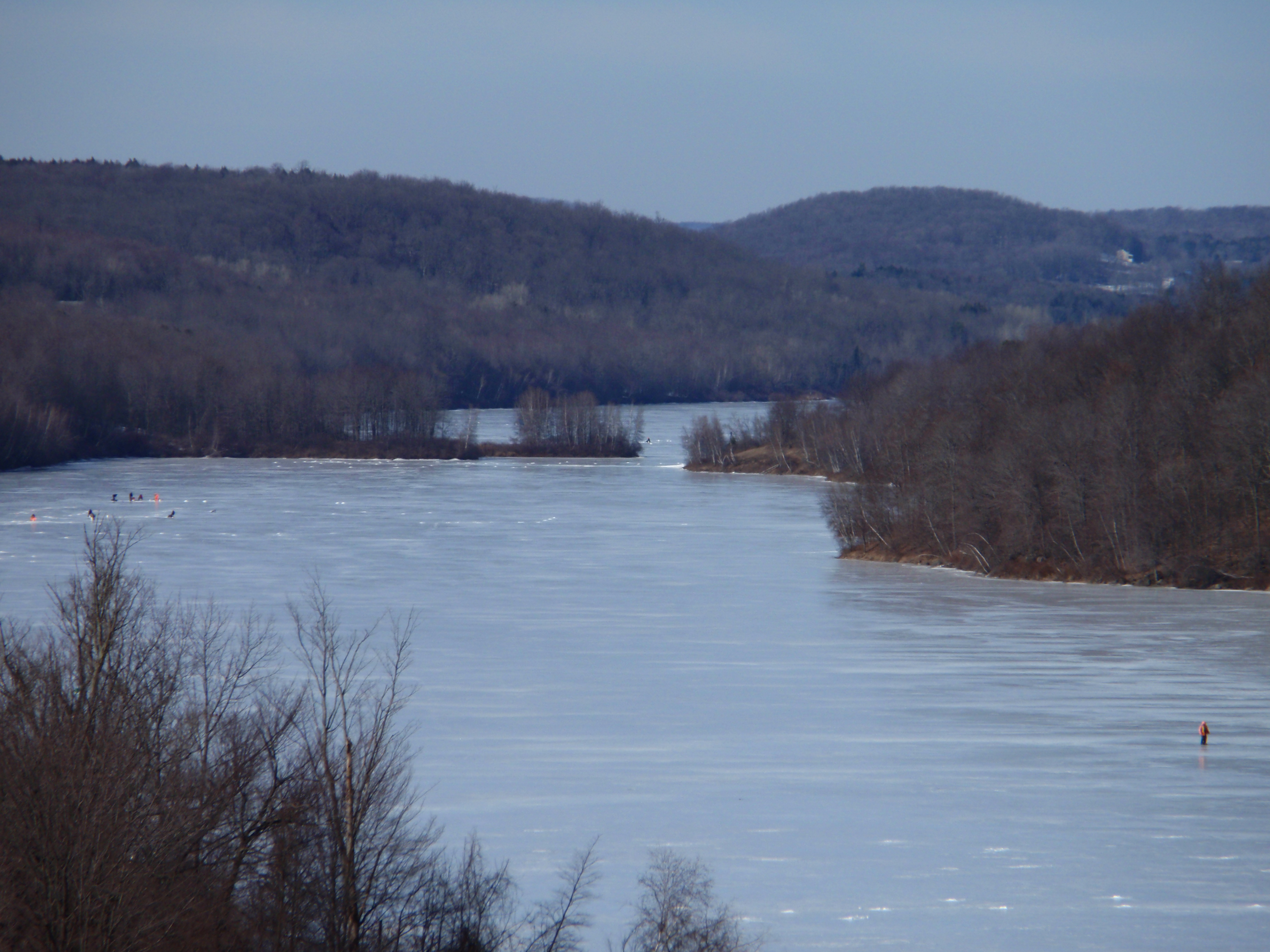
Ice fishing on a frozen Prompton Lake.

Fishing, including ice-fishing, is permitted in the 290-acre Prompton Lake. Hunting is also permitted in most of the park along with trapping and dog training during hunting season. Both activities require proper licenses.

=== Trails ===
There are over 26 miles (41 km) of hiking trails surrounding the lake. All trails are marked with blazes. All hiking trails are also open to mountain biking, snowshoeing, and cross-country skiing. The hiking trails have varying terrains and elevation with varying levels of difficulty.

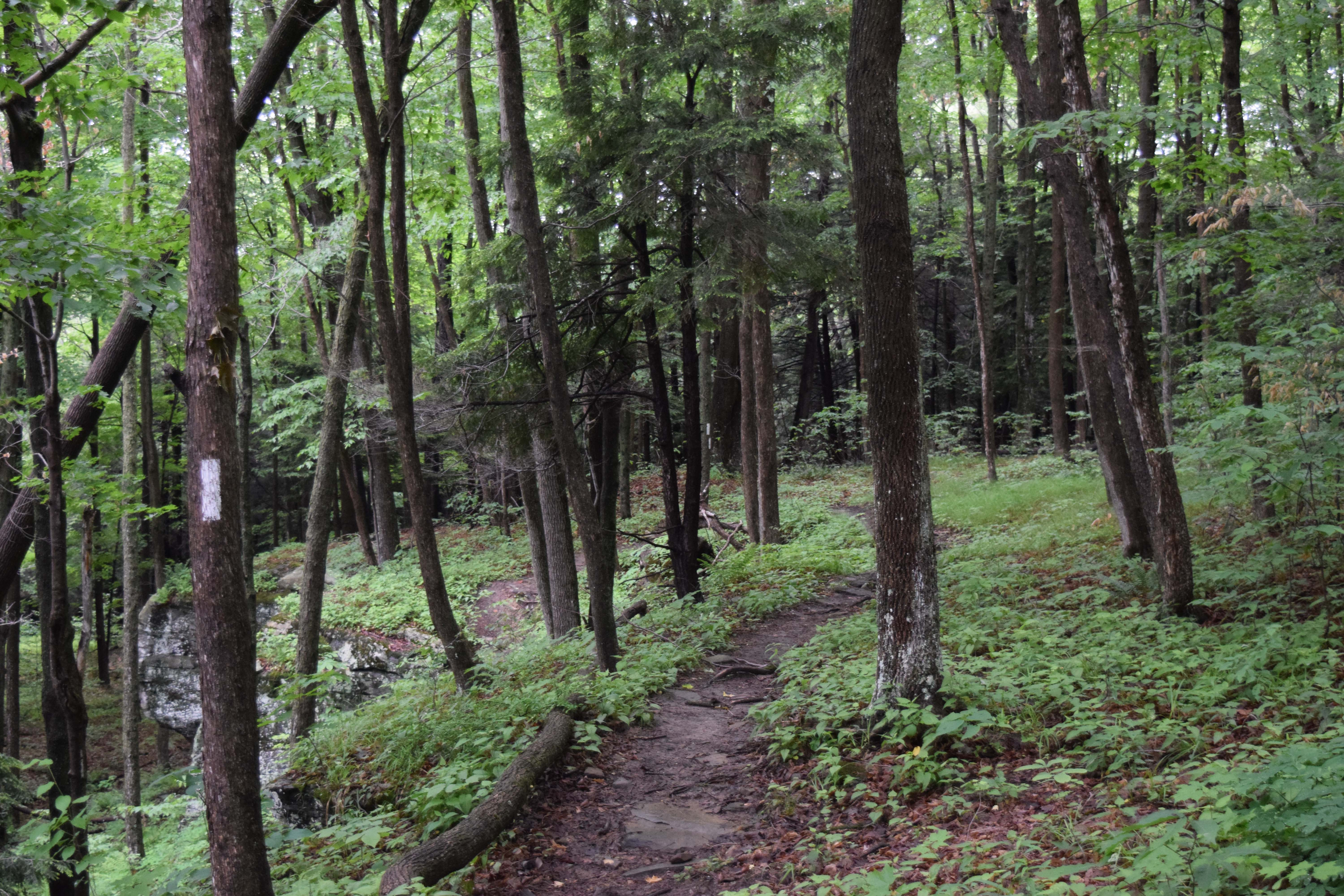
Single-track trail at Prompton State Park

On the south end of the park, the parking lot is beside the dam on route 170 near the intersection of route 6. On the north end of the park, a parking lot is accessible off of Beech Grove Road.

- East Shore Trail is a 4.5-mile (7.2 km) trail with red blazes It extends the complete length of the lake from Beech Grove Road in the north to the top of the dam at the south. From Beech Grove Road, the trail is paved for the first mile. The paved portion of the trail is the original route 170 from before the dam was built. The remaining road was flooded under the lake.
- West Shore Trail is a 3.5-mile (5.6 km) trail with red blazes. This trail also runs the complete length of the lake. It runs from the west starting at the dam in the south to the RV airplane field in the north.
- Orchard Trail is a 3.5-mile (5.6 km) trail with white blazes. This trail runs the complete length of the lake along the west side of the lake, and it parallels the West Shore Trail.
- Sugar Shack Trail is a 2-mile (4.8 km) trail with white blazes. It begins on East Shore Trail and meets Eagle Pass Trail on the east side of the lake.

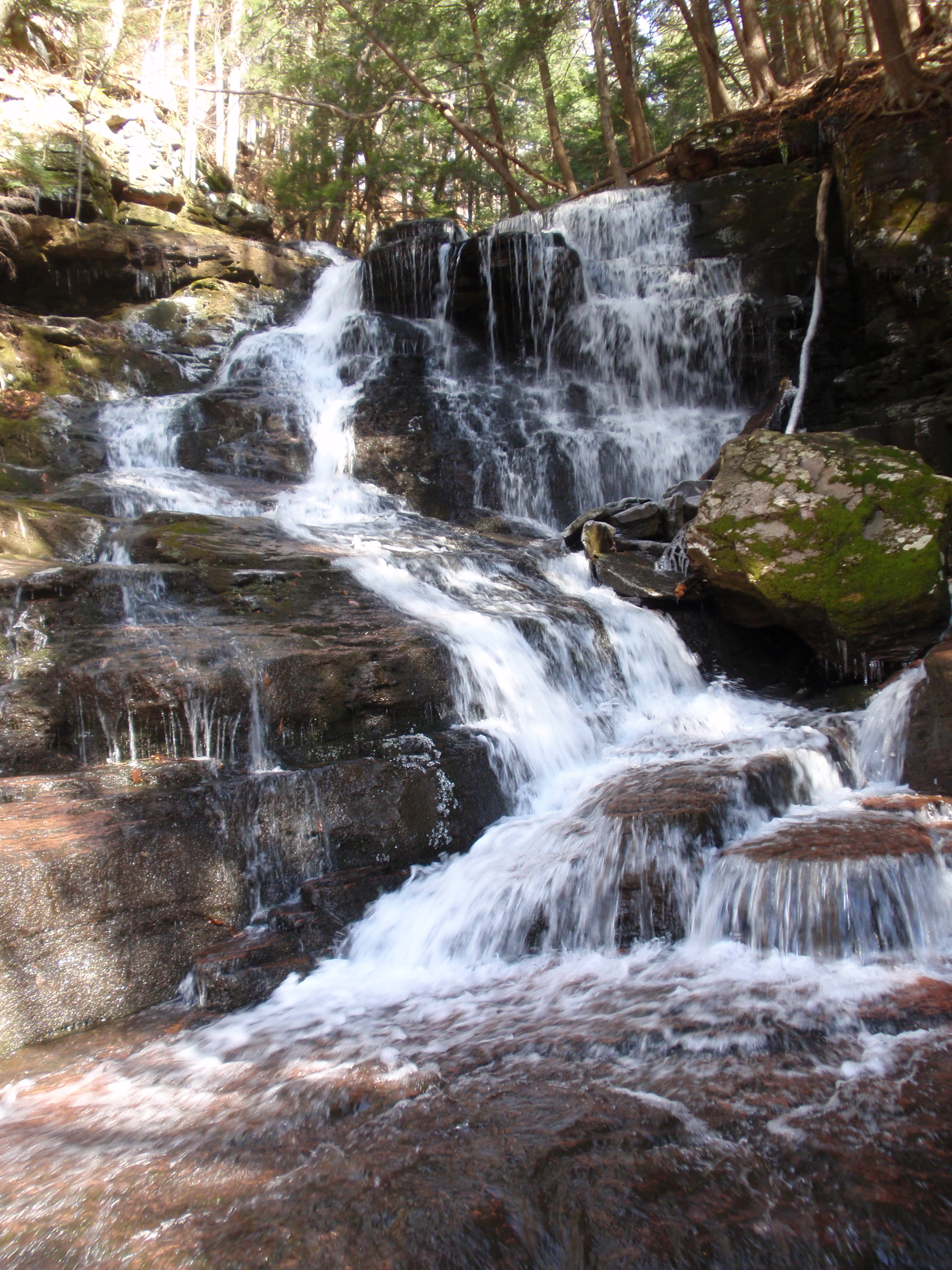
Waterfall near Cliff Trail

Additional trails accessible from the North End:

- Cliff Trail is a 1.3-mile (2 km) trail with red blazes. Starts at Sidewinder Trail and comes back to Pine Creek Trail.
- Blueberry Trail is a 1.5-mile (2.4 km) trail with blue blazes. A loop off Pine Creek Trail at the northeast end of the park.
- Eagle Pass Trail is a 1-mile (1.6 km) trail green blazes. Connects Cross Trail with East Shore and Sugar Shack trails.
- Sidewinder Trail is a 1-mile (1.6 km) trail with red blazes. From East Shore Trail to the beginning of Sidewinder Trail.
- Pine Creek Trail is a 1.7-mile (2.7 km) trail with orange blazes. In the northeast end of the park, this trail begins and ends at Cliff Trail.

Additional trails accessible from the South End:

- Bone Ridge Trail is a 2-mile (3.2 km) trail with yellow blazes Starts and ends on Hemlock Trail near the east side of the dam.
- Hemlock Trail is a 2-mile (3.2 km) trail with yellow blazes Starts at the east end of the dam and meets up with High Ledge Trail.
- High Ledge Trail is a 2-mile (3.2 km) trail white blazes Starts at East Shore Trail and meets Sugar Shack Trail.
