= Daniel J. O'Neill =

US Army major general

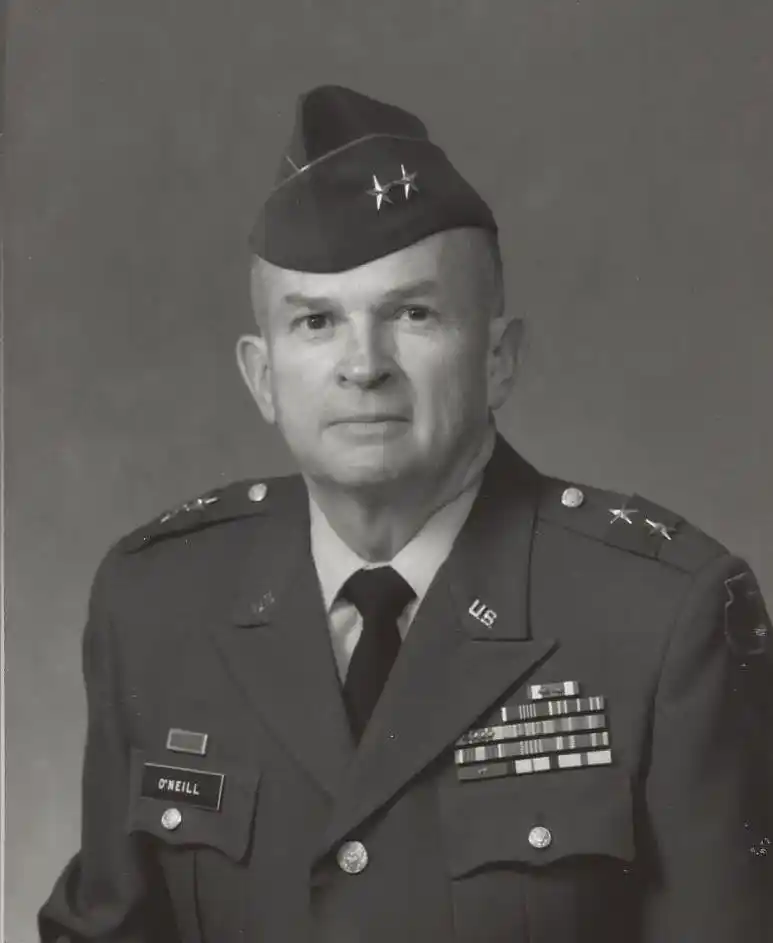
- O'Neill as commander of the 28th Infantry Division, c. 1989
- Born: July 24, 1937; Pleasant Mount, Pennsylvania, US
- Died: July 28, 2015 (aged 78); Honesdale, Pennsylvania, US
- Burial place: Saint Juliana's Cemetery, Rock Lake, Pennsylvania, US
- Education: University of Scranton; Lehigh University; United States Army Command and General Staff College; Industrial College of the Armed Forces; United States Army War College
- Spouse: Alice Hauenstein (m. 1959–2015)
- Children: 4
- Military career
- Service: United States Army
- Service years: 1959–1995
- Rank: Major General (National Guard); Lieutenant General (Pennsylvania retired list)
- Unit: Pennsylvania Army National Guard
- Commands: Company A, 1st Battalion, 109th Infantry Regiment; 1st Battalion, 109th Infantry Regiment; 55th Infantry Brigade; 28th Infantry Division
- Awards: Army Distinguished Service Medal; Legion of Merit
- Other work: Public school teacher and administrator

Daniel J. O'Neill (24 July 1937 – 28 July 2015) was an American schoolteacher, school administrator, and military officer from Pennsylvania. A longtime member of the Pennsylvania Army National Guard, he served from 1959 to 1995 and attained the rank of major general as commander of the 28th Infantry Division. O'Neill was the recipient of several military awards, including the Army Distinguished Service Medal and Legion of Merit.

A native of Pleasant Mount, Pennsylvania, O'Neill was raised and educated in Pleasant Mount and was a 1955 graduate of Pleasant Mount High School. He received his bachelor's degree from the University of Scranton in 1959, and began a career as a school teacher, principal, and superintendent that culminated with appointment as superintendent of the Wayne Highlands School District. During his career as an educator, he received master's degrees from the University of Scranton (education) and Lehigh University (counseling).

O'Neill participated in the Army Reserve Officers' Training Corps while at the University of Scranton and in June 1959 he received his commission as a second lieutenant in the Military Police. He served in the United States Army for 18 months, then joined the Pennsylvania Army National Guard. He attained qualification as an Infantry officer and served primarily in 1st Battalion, 109th Infantry Regiment. In addition to staff assignments of increased rank and responsibility, O'Neill commanded a company, a battalion, and a brigade. He attained the rank of brigadier general in 1987 as assistant division commander of the 28th Infantry Division. In 1989, he was assigned to command the division, and in 1990 he was promoted to major general. He left command in 1994, and retired from the military in 1995.

O'Neill died in Honesdale, Pennsylvania on 28 July 2015. He was buried at Saint Juliana's Cemetery in Rock Lake, Pennsylvania.

== Early life ==
Daniel Joseph O'Neill was born in Pleasant Mount, Pennsylvania on 24 July 1937, the son of Paul L. O'Neill and Eleanor M. (Leonard) O'Neill. He was raised and educated in Pleasant Mount, and graduated from Pleasant Mount High School in 1955. He was known for his athletic ability and as a member of the basketball team averaged over 30 points a game during his senior year. O'Neill graduated from the University of Scranton with a Bachelor of Science degree in 1959; during his college athletic career, he was a six time letter-winner in basketball and baseball. He went on to earn a Master of Science in education from the University of Scranton in 1964 and a Master of Science in counseling from Lehigh University in the mid-1980s.

== Start of career ==
After his college graduation, O'Neill taught in the Susquehanna School District, where he also coached varsity baseball and basketball. In 1969, he moved to the Wayne Highlands School District, where he served as assistant principal of Honesdale High School until 1972. He was then appointed as the school's principal, and he remained in this position through 1989. From 1989 to 1999, he served as the Wayne Highlands School District's school superintendent. His tenure was notable for his oversight of planning and construction of numerous building and sports complex projects.

O'Neill completed the Army Reserve Officers' Training Corps program at the University of Scranton and received his commission as a second lieutenant of Military Police in June 1959. After graduating from the Military Police Officer Basic Course, he served on active duty as a platoon leader with the 716th Military Police Battalion, which was stationed at Fort Dix, New Jersey. He left the army in December 1960 and joined the Pennsylvania Army National Guard.

=== Family ===
In December 1959, O'Neill married Alice Hauenstein. They were the parents of four children, Kelly, Erin, Sandra, and Michael.

=== Military education ===
Among the courses O'Neill completed were:

- Military Police Officer Basic Course
- Infantry Officer Advanced Course
- United States Army Command and General Staff College
- Industrial College of the Armed Forces National Security Management Course
- United States Army War College

== Continued career ==
During his National Guard career, O'Neill served in staff assignments of increasing rank and responsibility. As he advanced through the ranks, his command assignments included: Company A, 1st Battalion, 109th Infantry Regiment in Honesdale; 1st Battalion, 109th Infantry in Scranton; and commander of the 55th Infantry Brigade in Scranton.

In 1987, O'Neill was promoted to brigadier general and assigned as assistant division commander of the 28th Infantry Division. In November 1989, O'Neill was appointed to command the 28th Infantry Division, succeeding Vernon E. James, and he was subsequently promoted to major general. He continued to lead the division until 1994, when he was succeeded by Joseph F. Perugino and assigned as deputy commander of the Pennsylvania National Guard's State Area Command. He retired from the military in September 1995.

O'Neill was a licensed fixed-wing pilot and a longtime high school and college basketball referee. A noted civic activist, a partial list of his activities included president of the Suburban Football Conference, board of directors of the Pennsylvania Interscholastic Athletic Association's District 12; member of the board of controllers of the Pennsylvania Interscholastic Athletic Association, member of the board of directors of the Wayne County Bank and Trust Company, and chairman of the board of trustees of the Wayne Memorial Hospital Authority. He was also a founding member of "E-Z Construction Company," the volunteer organization that planned and oversaw construction of the Honesdale Community Pool. Beginning in 2005, O'Neill spent winters in Florida while continuing to reside in Honesdale. He died in Honesdale on 28 July 2015. O'Neill was buried at Saint Juliana's Cemetery in Rock Lake, Pennsylvania.

== Dates of rank ==
O'Neill's dates of rank were:

- Major General (retired), 1995
- Major General, 1990
- Brigadier General, 1987
- Colonel, 1986
- Lieutenant Colonel, 1981
- Major, 1972
- Captain, 1965
- First Lieutenant, 1962
- Second Lieutenant, 1959

== Awards ==
=== Federal awards ===
O'Neill's federal awards included:

- Army Distinguished Service Medal.
- Legion of Merit.
- Army Meritorious Service Medal
- Army Commendation Medal
- Army Achievement Medal
- National Defense Service Medal
- Armed Forces Reserve Medal
- Army Reserve Components Achievement Medal
- Army Service Ribbon

=== State awards ===
Among O'Neill's state awards were:

- Pennsylvania Meritorious Service Medal
- Pennsylvania Service Ribbon
- Pennsylvania 20-Year Service Medal
- Major General Thomas R. White Medal
- Major General Thomas J. Stewart Medal

=== Additional recognition ===
At his retirement, O'Neill was promoted to lieutenant general on the Pennsylvania National Guard's retired list. In 2016, the athletic facility at Honesdale High School was dedicated as the Daniel J. O'Neill Sports Complex.
