= Preston Park, Pennsylvania =

Unincorporated community in Pennsylvania, US

- Unincorporated community
- Location within Pennsylvania
- Coordinates: 41°52′52″N 75°21′22″W
- Country: United States
- State: Pennsylvania
- County: Wayne
- Elevation: 1,447 ft (441 m)
- Time zone: UTC-5 (Eastern (EST))
  - Summer (DST): UTC-4 (EDT)
- ZIP code: 18455
- Area codes: 272 & 570
- GNIS feature ID: 1184401

Preston Park is an unincorporated community in Wayne County, Pennsylvania, United States. The community is located along Pennsylvania Route 370, 6 miles (9.7 km) east-southeast of Starrucca. Preston Park has a post office with ZIP code 18455, which opened on December 11, 1890.
