= Newburgh and Cochecton Turnpike =

Route information
- Maintained by NYSDOT
- Length: 57 mi (92 km)
- Existed: 1810–1872

Major junctions
- West end: Cochecton, New York
- East end: Newburgh, New York

Location
- Country: United States
- State: New York

Highway system
- Auto trails; New York Highways; Interstate; US; State; Reference; Parkways

The Newburgh and Cochecton Turnpike was a turnpike road in southern New York in the United States. It ran from Newburgh on the Hudson River west to Cochecton on the Delaware River, where travelers could continue west through Pennsylvania on the Cochecton and Great Bend Turnpike toward Binghamton. The road operated as a toll road from 1810 to 1872. It is now mostly maintained by the state, carrying New York State Route 17K (NY 17K) from Newburgh to Bloomingburg and NY 17B from Monticello to Fosterdale. Between Bloomingburg and Monticello, the turnpike has been bypassed by the Quickway (NY 17), and is now maintained by Sullivan County; similarly, the route west of Fosterdale to Cochecton is County Route 114 (CR 114). Across the Delaware River, Pennsylvania Route 371 (PA 371) leads west from the Cochecton–Damascus Bridge.

== Route description ==
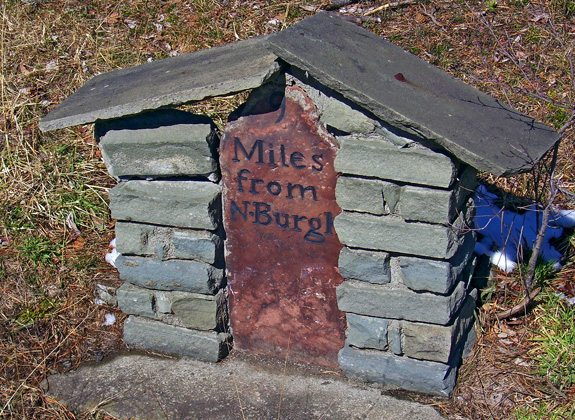
Old Newburgh and Cochecton Turnpike marker on NY 17K in the town of Montgomery.

The Newburgh and Cochecton Turnpike began on the eastern bank of the Delaware River in the hamlet of Cochecton, New York, where travelers could continue west through Pennsylvania on the Cochecton and Great Bend Turnpike toward Binghamton. This turnpike became the basis for modern PA 371. From Cochecton, the turnpike headed generally southeastward to the city of Newburgh on the Hudson River by way of Monticello and Wurtsboro. The old turnpike path roughly corresponds to what is now CR 114 from Cochecton to Fosterdale, NY 17B between Fosterdale and Monticello, CR 173, CR 172, and CR 171 from Monticello to Bloomingburg, and NY 17K between Bloomingburg and Newburgh. The Quickway (NY 17) closely parallels the old turnpike alignment between Monticello and Bloomingburg.

== History ==
On March 20, 1801, the Newburgh and Cochecton Turnpike Company was established, tasked with building a road from the Delaware River at Cochecton to the then-village of Newburgh. The company's initial funds came from the village of Newburgh and area residents, who allocated $126,000 to the new company. These funds were used to construct the Newburgh and Cochecton Turnpike in 1810. The construction of the toll road caused the area surrounding the highway to quickly grow in size. At its west end, the influx of workers led to the creation of Sullivan County in 1809. To the east, the traffic generated by this and other turnpikes sparked a similar period of growth and prosperity in the village of Newburgh. The village became a city in 1865.

The turnpike served as the area's main transport route until 1871, when it was replaced in purpose by the Middletown and Crawford Railroad. Ownership and maintenance of the highway was turned over to the towns it passed through in 1872, effectively dissolving the toll road. In the early 20th century, the state of New York took over maintenance of the old turnpike from Fosterdale to Newburgh, repurposing the highway as a toll-free state road. Two sections of the highway became part of state routes when the modern New York state route system was established in 1924, and the entire Fosterdale–Newburgh highway was assigned a number as part of the 1930 state highway renumbering. The piece from Monticello to Bloomingburg was bypassed by the Quickway in the mid-to-late 1950s; however, the rest of the Fosterdale–Newburgh segment is still state-maintained as parts of NY 17B and NY 17K.

== See also ==
- List of turnpikes in New York
