= Lebanon Township, Wayne County, Pennsylvania =

Township in Pennsylvania, US

Lebanon Township
- Township
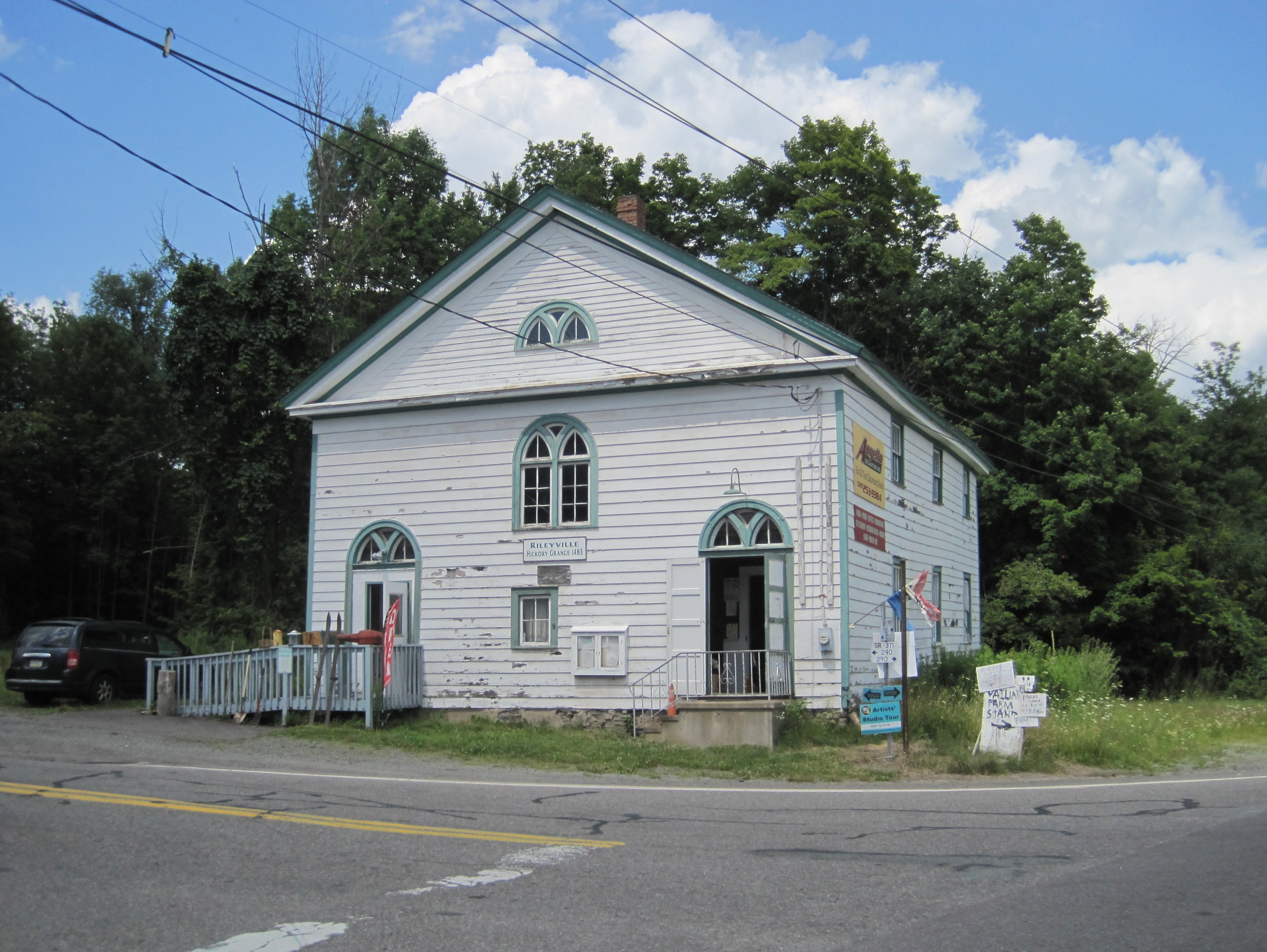
- Hickory Grange in Rileyville where some township supervisor meetings are held

- Location in Wayne County and the state of Pennsylvania.

- Location of Pennsylvania in the United States
- Coordinates: 41°42′00″N 75°12′59″W
- Country: United States
- State: Pennsylvania
- County: Wayne

Area
  - Total: 38.15 sq mi (98.81 km^{2})
  - Land: 37.24 sq mi (96.44 km^{2})
  - Water: 0.92 sq mi (2.38 km^{2})
- Elevation: 1,457 ft (444 m)

Population (2010)
  - Total: 684
  - Estimate (2016): 657
  - Density: 17.6/sq mi (6.81/km^{2})
- Time zone: UTC-5 (EST)
  - Summer (DST): UTC-4 (EDT)
- Area code: 570
- FIPS code: 42-127-42176

Lebanon is a second-class township in Wayne County, Pennsylvania, United States. The township's population was 684 at the time of the 2010 United States Census.

== Geography ==
According to the United States Census Bureau, the township has a total area of 38.1 square miles (99 km^{2}), of which 37.2 square miles (96 km^{2}) is land and 0.9 square miles (2.3 km^{2}) (2.36%) is water.

== Demographics ==
Historical population
Census	Pop.	Note	%±
2010	684		—
2016 (est.)	657		−3.9%
U.S. Decennial Census

As of the census of 2010, there were 684 people, 279 households, and 201 families residing in the township. The population density was 18.4 people per square mile (7.1/km^{2}). There were 440 housing units at an average density of 11.8/sq mi (4.6/km^{2}). The racial makeup of the township was 97.1% White, 1.6% African American, 0.4% Asian, 0.1% some other race, and 0.7% two or more races. Hispanic or Latino of any race were 1.6% of the population.

There were 279 households, out of which 25.8% had children under the age of 18 living with them, 59.9% were married couples living together, 8.2% had a female householder with no husband present, and 28% were non-families. 24.4% of all households were made up of individuals, and 10.7% had someone living alone who was 65 years of age or older. The average household size was 2.45 and the average family size was 2.88.

In the township the population was spread out, with 20.9% under the age of 18, 60.5% from 18 to 64, and 18.6% who were 65 years of age or older. The median age was 47 years.

The median income for a household in the township was $42,000, and the median income for a family was $53,214. Males had a median income of $45,156 versus $30,217 for females. The per capita income for the township was $29,011. About 11.6% of families and 10.1% of the population were below the poverty line, including 47.1% of those under age 18 and 6.3% of those age 65 or over.
