= Clinton Township, Wayne County, Pennsylvania =

Township in Pennsylvania, US

Coordinates: 41°38′38.4″N 75°24′12.7″W

- Second-class township
- Township of Clinton
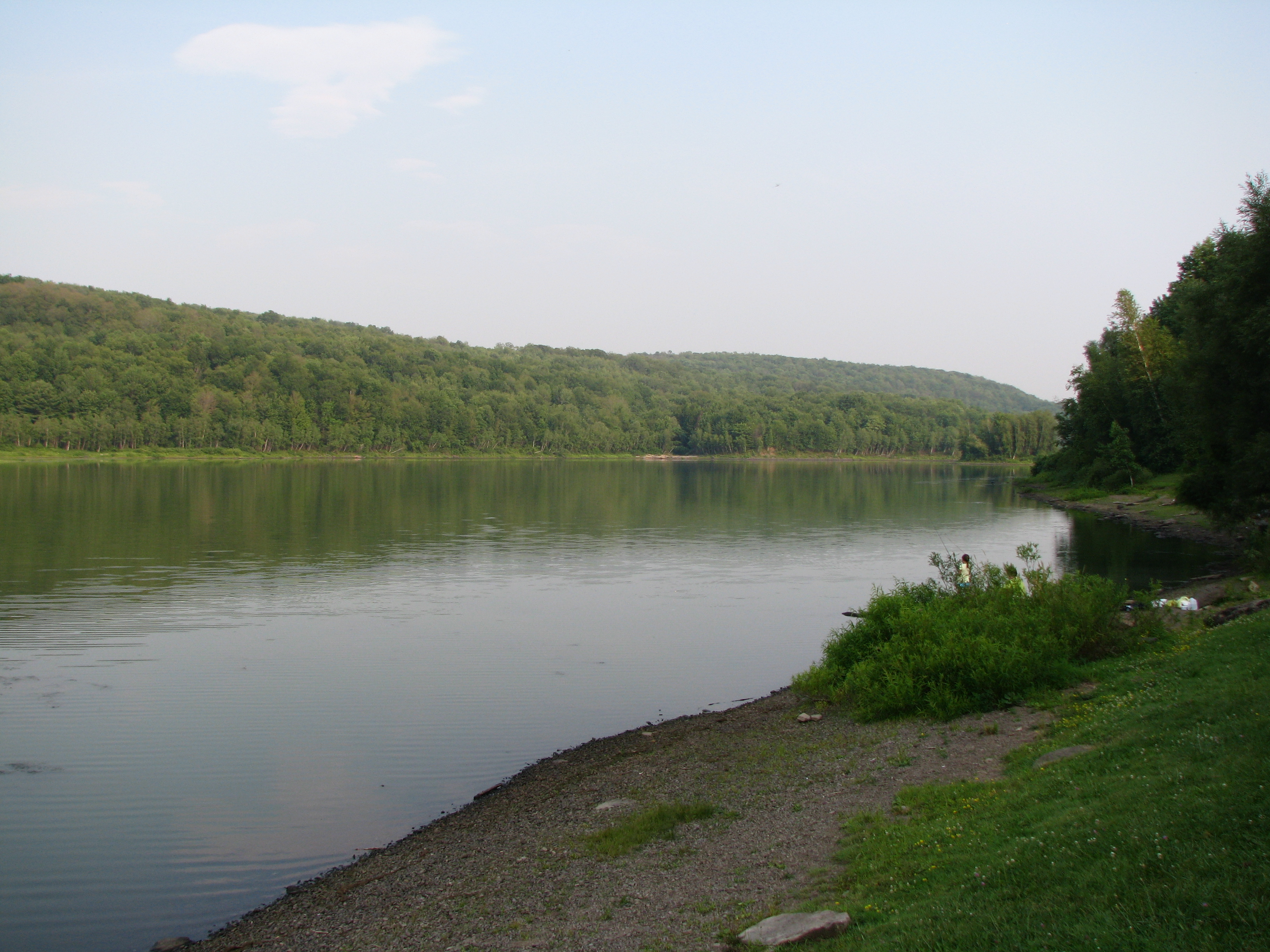
- Lake at Prompton State Park

- Location in Wayne County and the state of Pennsylvania.
- Country: United States
- State: Pennsylvania
- US Congressional District: PA-8
- State Senatorial District: 20
- State House of Representatives Districts: 111; 139
- County: Wayne
- School Districts: Forest City Regional (Region I); Western Wayne (Region I)
- Settled: 1810
- Incorporated: November 17, 1834
- Founder: Levi Norton
- Named for: DeWitt Clinton

Government
  - Type: Board of Supervisors
  - Board of Supervisors: Supervisors: Ken Coles (Chairman); Scott Zablocky (Vice-Chairman); Ronald Poska
  - US Representative: Matt Cartwright (D)
  - State Senator: Lisa Baker (R)
  - State Representatives: Sandra Major (R); Michael Peifer (R)

Area
  - Total: 39.59 sq mi (102.54 km^{2})
  - Land: 38.26 sq mi (99.09 km^{2})
  - Water: 1.33 sq mi (3.45 km^{2})
- Elevation: 1,434 ft (437 m)

Population (2020)
  - Total: 2,040
  - Density: 53.3/sq mi (20.59/km^{2})
- Time zone: UTC-5 (Eastern (EST))
  - Summer (DST): UTC-4 (Eastern Daylight (EDT))
- Area code: 570
- GNIS feature ID: 1217216
- FIPS code: 42-127-14352

Clinton Township is a second-class township in Wayne County, Pennsylvania, United States. The township's population was 2,040 at the time of the 2020 United States Census.

== Geography ==
According to the United States Census Bureau, the township has a total area of 39.6 square miles (103 km^{2}), of which 38.3 square miles (99 km^{2}) is land and 1.3 square miles (3.4 km^{2}) (3.36%) is water.

=== Communities ===
The following villages are located in Clinton Township:

- Aldenville
- Browndale (also called Forest City Station)
- Creamton

== Demographics ==
Historical population
Census	Pop.	Note	%±
2010	2,053		—
2020	2,040		−0.6%
U.S. Decennial Census

As of the census of 2010, there were 2,053 people, 851 households, and 567 families residing in the township. The population density was 53.7 inhabitants per square mile (20.7/km^{2}). There were 1,185 housing units at an average density of 30.2 per square mile (11.7/km^{2}). The racial makeup of the township was 98.5% White, 0.2% African American, 0.05% Native American, 0.2% Asian, 0.1% from other races, and 0.8% from two or more races. Hispanic or Latino of any race were 0.9% of the population.

There were 851 households, out of which 25.7% had children under the age of 18 living with them, 55% were married couples living together, 8.2% had a female householder with no husband present, and 33.4% were non-families. 28.9% of all households were made up of individuals, and 12.5% had someone living alone who was 65 years of age or older. The average household size was 2.41 and the average family size was 2.97.

In the township the population was spread out, with 20.8% under the age of 18, 61.6% from 18 to 64, and 17.6% who were 65 years of age or older. The median age was 44.9 years.

The median income for a household in the township was $34,811, and the median income for a family was $42,782. Males had a median income of $29,896 versus $20,341 for females. The per capita income for the township was $15,363. About 6.0% of families and 9.6% of the population were below the poverty line, including 10.0% of those under age 18 and 13.2% of those age 65 or over.

== Education ==
The majority of areas of the township in the Western Wayne School District, while a portion in the northwest is in the Forest City Regional School District.
