= Lake Como, Pennsylvania =

Unincorporated community in Pennsylvania, US

- Village
- Village of Lake Como
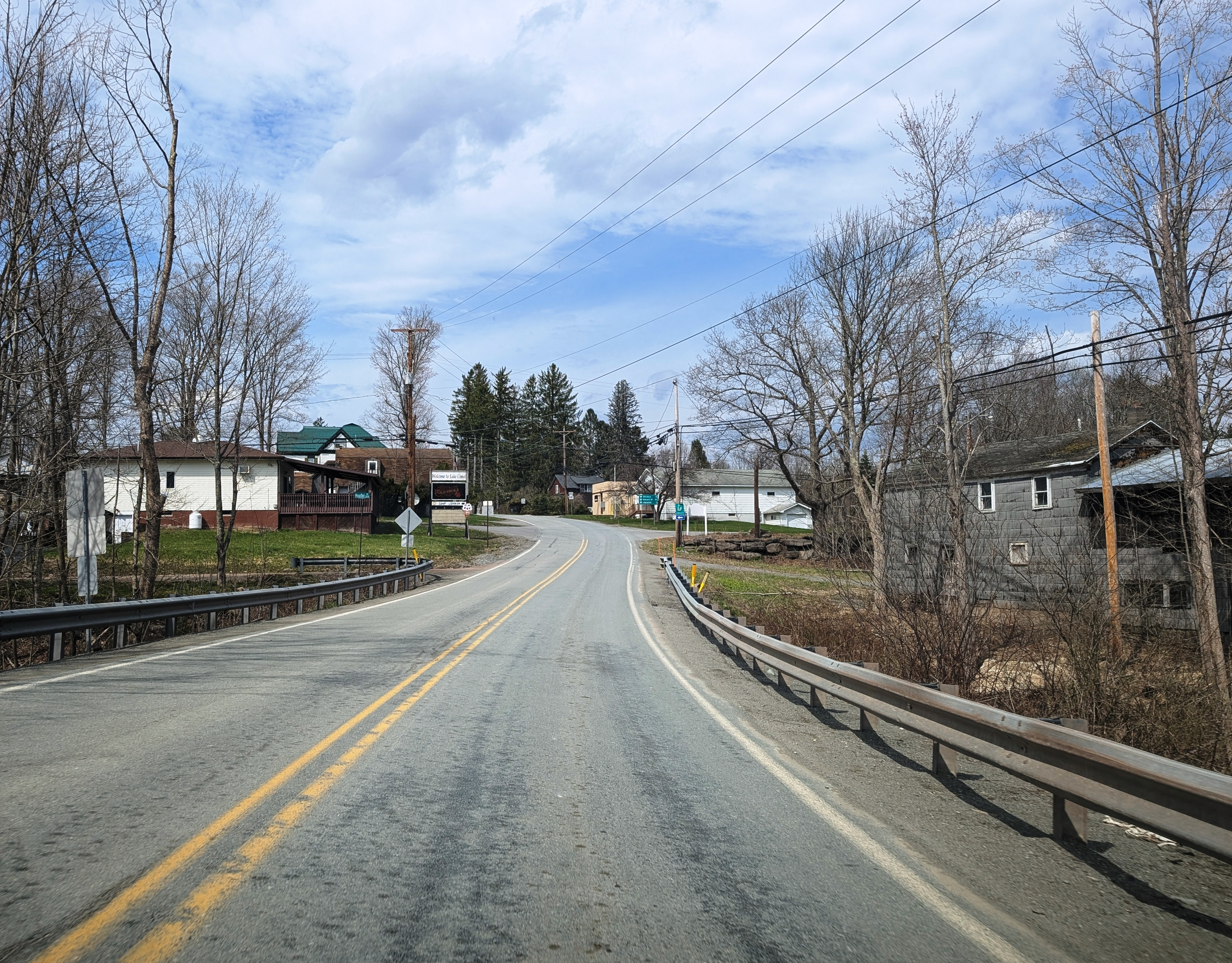
- PA 247 northbound in Lake Como
- Nickname: Como
- Lake Como's location within Pennsylvania. Lake Como (the United States)
- Coordinates: 41°50′59″N 75°20′13″W
- Country: United States
- State: Pennsylvania
- U.S. Congressional District: 10
- County: Wayne
- School District: Wayne Highlands; Region I
- Magisterial District: 22-3-04
- Townships: Buckingham; Preston
- Named for: Lake Como, Italy
- Elevation: 1,519 ft (463 m)
- Time zone: UTC-5 (Eastern (EST))
  - Summer (DST): UTC-4 (Eastern Daylight (EDT))
- ZIP code: 18437
- Area code: 570
- GNIS feature ID: 1178772
- FIPS code: 42-127-62600-40968

Lake Como is a village in Buckingham and Preston Townships in Wayne County, Pennsylvania.

== History ==
The town is named after Lake Como in Italy.

== Background ==
Lake Como between 20 and 30 houses along its shores, inhabited by a mix of year-round residents and vacationers.

Nearby are summer camps Nesher, Lohikan, Wayne and Morasha. Landmarks include "The Fort," "The Rock Wall", and "Endless LW."

There are many species of fish in the private lake, including bass, chain pickerel, walleye, perch, blue-gills, crappies, sun-fish, and bullheads. There are also turtles, snakes, frogs and freshwater mussels.
