= Stillwater Dam (Pennsylvania) =

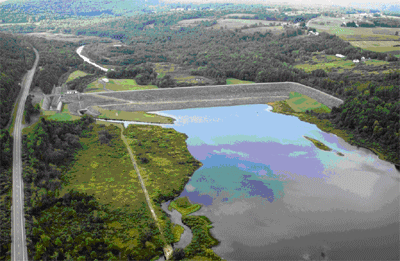
- Stillwater Dam and lake

- Location within Pennsylvania
- Country: USA
- Location: Clifford Township, Susquehanna County, near Union Dale, Pennsylvania, USA
- Coordinates: 41°41′48″N 075°29′09″W
- Purpose: Flood control
- Opening date: September 1960
- Construction cost: $5,725,700

Dam and spillways
- Impounds: Lackawanna River
- Height (thalweg): 75 ft (23 m)
- Length: 1,700 ft (518 m)

Reservoir
- Inactive capacity: 11,600 acre⋅ft (14,308,389 m^{3})
- Catchment area: 36.8 mi^{2} (95 km^{2})

The Stillwater Dam is an embankment dam on the Lackawanna River in Susquehanna County, Pennsylvania. It is located 3.2 mi (5 km) north of Forest City and was completed in September 1960. The primary purpose of the dam is flood control and its reservoir is usually maintained at low levels for that purpose. The high-water mark for the reservoir was on 2 April 1993 when it reached 1,617.85 ft (493 m) and a capacity of 88.9%.
