= Pleasant Mount, Pennsylvania =

Unincorporated community in Pennsylvania, US

- Unincorporated community
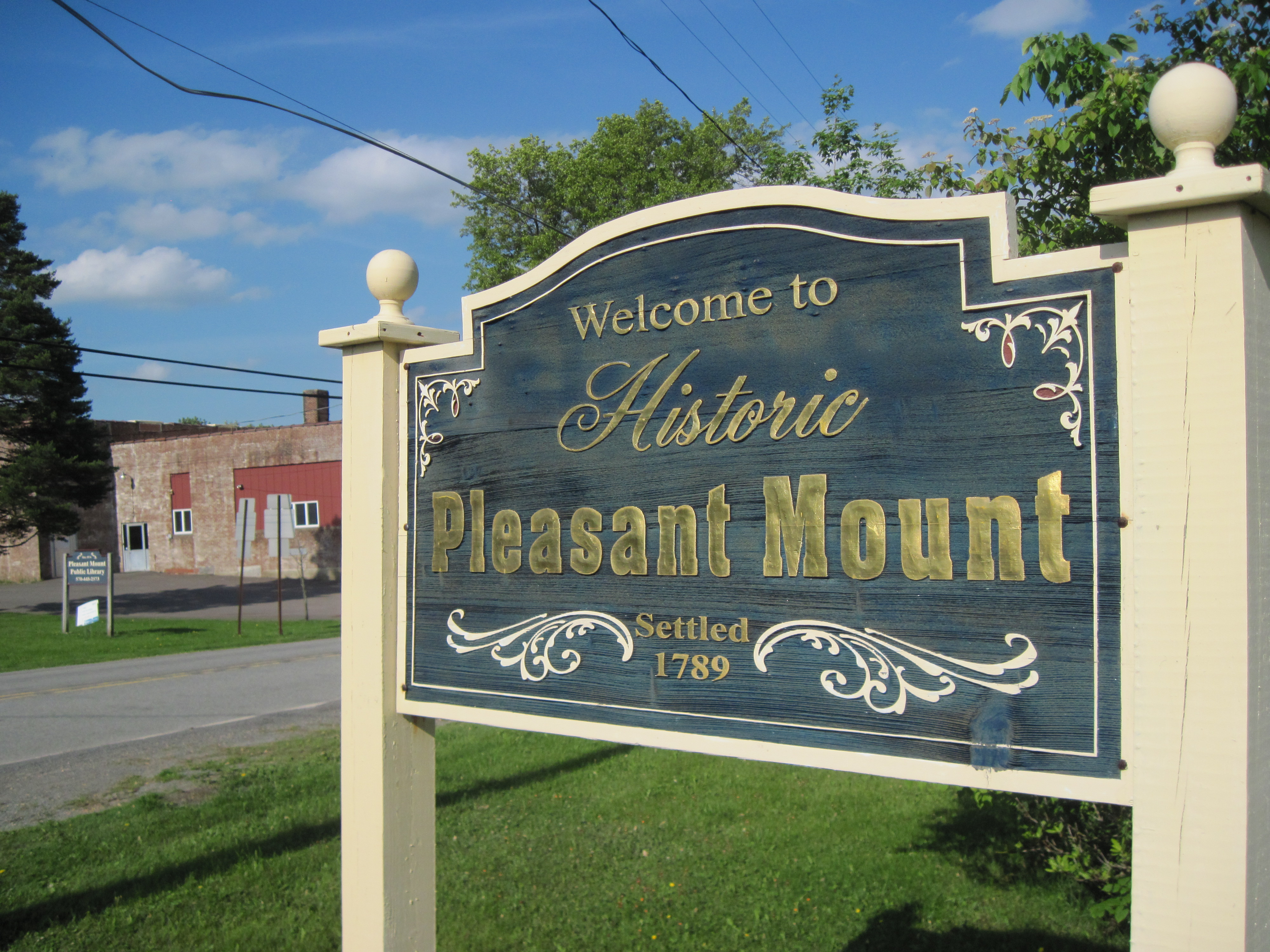
- The welcome sign for the Village of Pleasant Mount.
- Nicknames: Mount Pleasant, Mt. Pleasant, Pleasant Mt.
- Pleasant Mount's Location within Pennsylvania.
- Coordinates: 41°44′23″N 75°26′4″W
- Country: United States
- State: Pennsylvania
- U.S. Congressional District: PA-10
- School District: Forest City Regional
- County: Wayne
- Magisterial District: 22-3-04
- Township: Mount Pleasant
- Settled: June 1789
- Founder: Samuel Stanton
- Named for: Mount Pleasant Township
- Elevation: 1,982 ft (604 m)
- Time zone: UTC-5 (Eastern (EST))
  - Summer (DST): UTC-4 (Eastern Daylight (EDT))
- ZIP codes: 18453
- Area code: 570
- GNIS feature ID: 1184047
- FIPS code: 42-127-51872-61344
- Waterways: Biglow Lake, Lackawaxen River (West Branch)

Pleasant Mount is an unincorporated community in Mount Pleasant Township, Wayne County, Pennsylvania, United States.

== Notable residents ==
- Daniel J. O'Neill, US Army major general
