= Mount Pleasant Township, Wayne County, Pennsylvania =

Township in Pennsylvania, US

Mount Pleasant, Pennsylvania
- Second-class township
- Township of Mount Pleasant
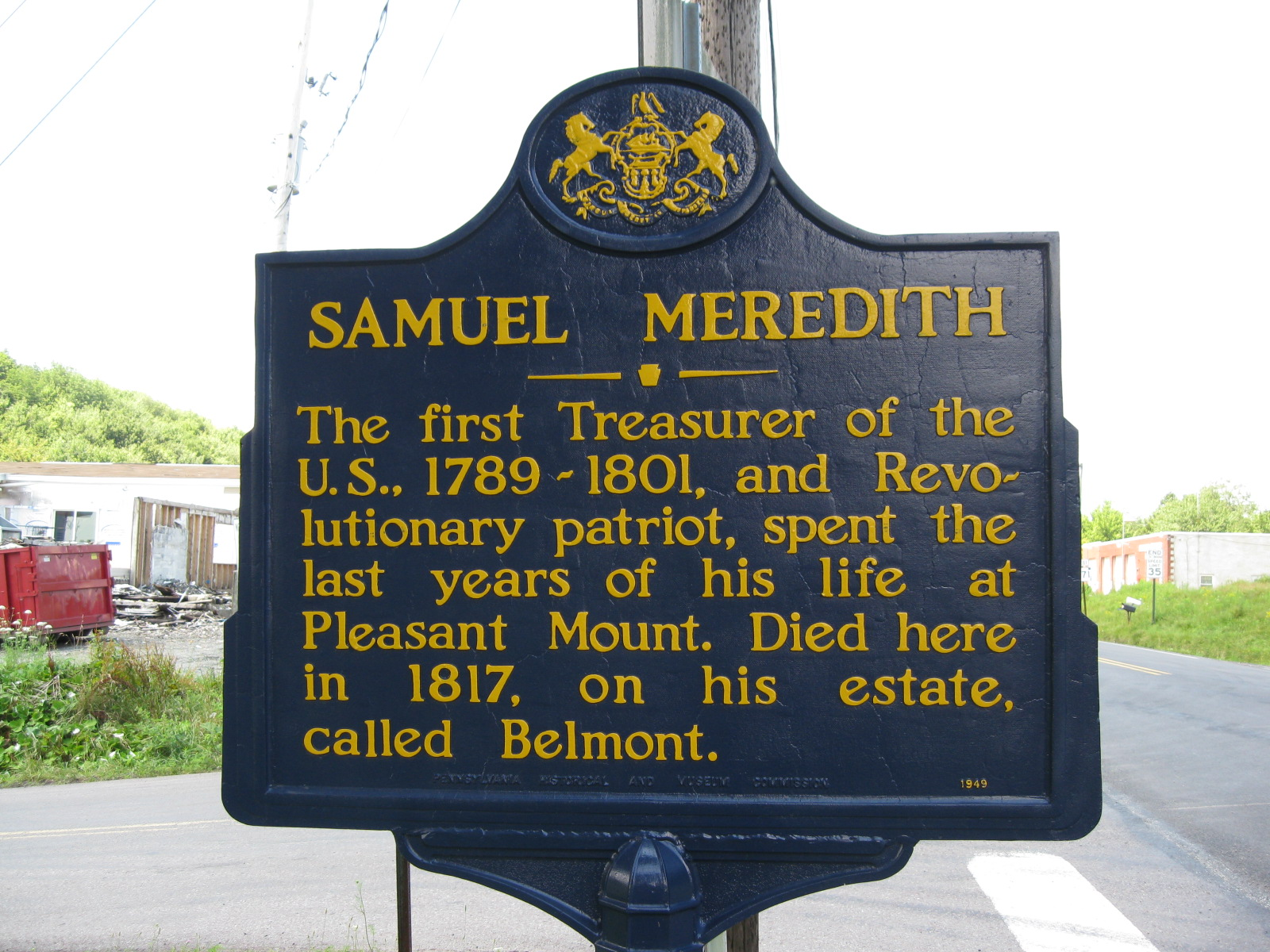
- A sign in Belmont Corners commemorating Samuel Meredith, the first Treasurer of the United States, and one of the more famous former residents of Mount Pleasant. Claims that Meredith was actually the second treasurer are incorrect as Meredith was the first treasurer to serve under the new U.S. constitution.

- Location in Wayne County and the state of Pennsylvania.
- Country: United States
- State: Pennsylvania
- US Congressional District: PA-8
- State Senatorial District: 20
- State House of Representatives District: 111
- County: Wayne
- School District: Forest City Regional; Regions V & IV
- Settled: June 1789
- Incorporated: March 21, 1798 (original township of Wayne County)
- Founder: Samuel Stanton

Government
  - Type: Board of Supervisors
  - Board of Supervisors: Supervisors: Albert Wildenstein; Phillip Eltz; Francis Nebzydoski
  - US Representative: Rob Bresnahan (R)
  - State Senator: Lisa Baker (R)
  - State Representative: Sandra Major (R)

Area
  - Total: 57.57 sq mi (149.11 km^{2})
  - Land: 56.46 sq mi (146.22 km^{2})
  - Water: 1.12 sq mi (2.89 km^{2})
- Elevation: 1,427 ft (434.9 m)

Population (2010)
  - Total: 1,357
  - Estimate (2016): 1,322
  - Density: 23.4/sq mi (9.04/km^{2})
- Time zone: UTC-5 (Eastern (EST))
  - Summer (DST): UTC-4 (Eastern Daylight (EDT))
- Area code: 570
- GNIS feature ID: 1217224
- FIPS code: 42-127-51872

Mount Pleasant is a second-class township in Wayne County, Pennsylvania, United States. The township's population was 1,357 at the time of the 2010 United States Census.

== Geography ==
According to the United States Census Bureau, the township has a total area of 57.6 square miles (149.2 km^{2}), of which 56.5 square miles (146 km^{2}) is land and 1.1 square miles (3 km^{2}) (1.91%) is water.

== Communities ==
The following villages are located in Mount Pleasant Township:

- Belmont Corners (also called Belmont Corner or simply "Belmont")
- Cascade
- Niagara
- Pleasant Mount
- Rock Lake
- Rudes Corners (also called Rudes Corner)
- Whites Valley

== Demographics ==
Historical population
Census	Pop.	Note	%±
2010	1,357		—
2016 (est.)	1,322		−2.6%
U.S. Decennial Census

As of the census of 2010, there were 1,357 people, 565 households, and 383 families residing in the township. The population density was 24 people per square mile (9.3/km^{2}). There were 831 housing units at an average density of 14.7/sq mi (5.7/km^{2}). The racial makeup of the township was 97.1% White, 0.7% African American, 0.2% American Indian, 0.9% Asian, 0.5% from other races, and 0.6% from two or more races. Hispanic or Latino of any race were 2.8% of the population.

There were 565 households, out of which 20.9% had children under the age of 18 living with them, 55.6% were married couples living together, 7.4% had a female householder with no husband present, and 32.2% were non-families. 26.4% of all households were made up of individuals, and 12% had someone living alone who was 65 years of age or older. The average household size was 2.40 and the average family size was 2.91.

In the township the population was spread out, with 19.7% under the age of 18, 59.4% from 18 to 64, and 20.9% who were 65 years of age or older. The median age was 48.6 years.

The median income for a household in the township was $53,424, and the median income for a family was $63,100. Males had a median income of $42,250 versus $29,038 for females. The per capita income for the township was $25,987. About 1.5% of families and 1.8% of the population were below the poverty line, including 2.2% of those under age 18 and 1.7% of those age 65 or over.

== Education ==
Forest City Regional School District is a Preschool-12th grade public school district serving residents of Mount Pleasant Township.

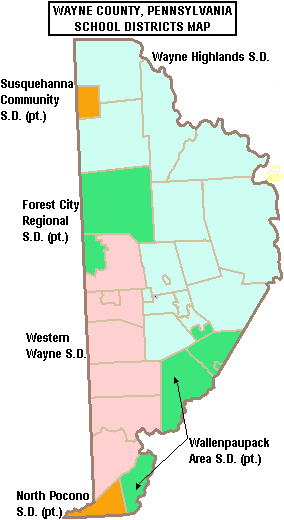
Map of Wayne County, Pennsylvania School Districts
