= Local government in Pennsylvania =

Government below the state level in the U.S. state of Pennsylvania

Pennsylvania Municipalities

Local government in Pennsylvania is government below the state level in Pennsylvania. There are six types of local governments listed in the Pennsylvania Constitution: county, township, borough, town, city, and school district. All of Pennsylvania is included in one of the state's 67 counties, which are in total subdivided into 2,560 municipalities. There are currently no independent cities or unincorporated territories within Pennsylvania. There is only one incorporated town in Pennsylvania, Bloomsburg.

== Government in Pennsylvania ==
Local municipalities can be governed by statutes, which are enacted by the Pennsylvania General Assembly, and are specific to the type and class of municipality; by a home rule municipality, under a home rule charter, adopted by the municipality; or by an optional form of government, adopted by the municipality. The township is the basic population center or town element in Pennsylvania, ranging in size from small hamlets to important population centers. These are given Class I or Class II powers, attributes, and responsibilities, and comprise the majority of communities in Pennsylvania. They are often characterized by lower population densities over a widespread region, within which small clusters of housing and mixed main road businesses occur.

Larger, more densely populated municipal entities, usually ones with a well defined business district and recognizable as having the traditional attributes of a 'town' is the Pennsylvania borough. There is a single (for historic reasons) town in Pennsylvania, so the next step up is the city. Both counties and school districts generally span multiple communities, including groups of municipalities that sometimes cross county lines. Each other subdivision is subordinate to county governmental functions, which include administration of courts, jails, code enforcement, and land registration.

Each municipality falls under a certain type of municipal laws by the classification of municipality, and some types of municipalities are then eligible to be reclassified into another class according to their population and passage of a change referendum. These classes limit or expand the local governmental powers, and the forms of local office holders and town officials. The General Assembly sets the population threshold for classifying said certain types of municipalities. There are currently nine classifications for counties, four classes of cities, two classes of townships, five classes of school districts, and no classes for boroughs or the single Pennsylvania town.

Finally, villages and census-designated places are a part of the local community. Although they are not recognized local governments, they often refer to specific areas of township or other municipality and are often more familiar to people than the incorporated municipality. That can cause confusion to people who live outside the area, who are unfamiliar with the local municipal structure.

== County ==
Counties (Pennsylvania German: Kaundis, singular Kaundi) in Pennsylvania serve the traditional roles for state including law enforcement, judicial administration, and election conduct. Some of the other functions that Pennsylvania's counties may perform include public health, property assessment, and redevelopment. Some of the welfare functions often performed by counties include mental health, geriatric care, community colleges, and library support.

Pennsylvania is divided into 67 counties. Most counties are governed by a board of commissioners, consisting of three members. Two must be of the majority party, and the third must be of the minority party, which is determined by which candidates receive the most votes, as two candidates from each party are on the November ballot. One of the members serves as the chair. The board of commissioners typically serves as both the legislative and executive body. In addition to the elected commissioners, most counties elect other officials, commonly called "row officers", independent of the board of commissioners. The offices include sheriff, district attorney, prothonotary, clerk of courts, register of wills, clerk of the orphans' court, recorder of deeds, treasurer, controller, auditors, and jury commissioners.

Seven counties currently have home rule charters: Allegheny, Delaware, Erie, Lackawanna, Lehigh, Luzerne, and Northampton. Philadelphia is a consolidated city-county with all of its county functions being administered by the city government. Those counties have the types of officials elected determined by the home rule charter, and they often differ from the officials elected in most counties.

Counties are further classified by population. Each classification has its own code, set up by the General Assembly, to administer county functions. The classification of counties is as follows:

Class	Max. Population	Min. Population	Number	Counties
First	—	1,500,000	1	Philadelphia
Second	1,499,999	1,000,000	1	Allegheny
Second A	999,999	500,000	4	Bucks, Delaware, Lancaster, Montgomery
Third	499,999	210,000*	11	Berks, Chester+, Cumberland, Dauphin, Erie, Lackawanna, Lehigh, Luzerne, Northampton, Westmoreland, York
Fourth	209,999	145,000	9	Beaver, Butler, Cambria+, Centre, Fayette+, Franklin, Monroe, Schuylkill+, Washington
Fifth	144,999	90,000	7	Adams, Blair, Lawrence+, Lebanon, Lycoming, Mercer, Northumberland
Sixth	89,999	45,000~	24	Armstrong, Bedford, Bradford, Carbon, Clarion~, Clearfield, Clinton~, Columbia, Crawford, (Note: This county is a sixth class county even though it had a population of over 90,000 in the 2000 census.) Elk+~, Greene~, Huntingdon+, Indiana, Jefferson+, McKean+, Mifflin, Perry, Pike, Somerset, Susquehanna~, Tioga~, Venango, Warren+, (Note: Warren County had to have elected to remain a sixth class county, however no source was found.) Wayne
Seventh	44,999	20,000	4	Juniata, Snyder, Union, Wyoming
Eighth	19,999	0	6	Cameron, Forest, Fulton, Montour, Potter, Sullivan

(*): A county of the third class that is determined to have a population of 500,000 or more may elect to continue to be a county of the third class.

(~): A county having a population between 35,000 and 44,999 may elect to be a county of the sixth class.

(+): A county's population must be under the minimum for a class for two (2) censuses prior to a reduction in class. Changes in county classification are suspended until after the 2030 United States census, unless a county elected to allow the change to occur before February 22, 2022. Lancaster County approved such a change, becoming a class 2A county.

== Municipalities ==
Keeping in mind that the geography and geology of Pennsylvania present many landscapes that are dominated by hills, streams, deep valleys, and mountain ridges, the list of municipalities of Pennsylvania range from higher numbers of entities with small populations in sparsely populated large regions, to those large in population, with less relative territory having denser populations. Pennsylvania's municipal classes are: townships, boroughs and cities. Most such subdivisions are entirely contained within a county. Some, like Bethlehem, cross county lines. It is not unusual for a borough to be adjacent to, and sometimes nearly surrounded by a township of the same name. In some instances, such as with the case of Thornbury Township in Chester County and Delaware County, two townships with the same name will border each other in adjoining counties.

Below the county level of organized services, everyone in Pennsylvania lives under the jurisdiction of at least two types of municipal governments. The first type of municipal government will provide police and fire protection, maintenance of local roads and streets, water supply, sewage collection and treatment, parking and traffic control, local planning and zoning, parks and recreation, garbage collection, health services, libraries, licensing of businesses, and code enforcement. The second type will administer the local schools, claim a separate portion of taxes and are called school districts. Organized along practical geographic lines, an occasional Area school district will cross county boundaries, though most are located within county regions providing community ties across multiple municipalities. The sense of belonging to a community in Pennsylvania is often tied to area High School sports teams.

Due to historic legalisms, Bloomsburg is the only officially designated and incorporated "town" in Pennsylvania. The mostly uninhabited, township-sized area of the East Fork Road District was classified as a sui generis district, unlike any other in the state, until its 2004 dissolution.

=== Unincorporated communities ===
Unincorporated communities in the state of Pennsylvania are well-defined communities that are part of one or more incorporated municipalities but are not independent municipalities in their own right. They have no elected form of government and have no authority granted to them by the state or county, but have a historical authority all their own. Often they are little more than neighborhoods once serviced by a railway station, that once had a post office in the 19th century, or were clustered as supporting community housing for a local industry, which may no longer exist. Many unincorporated communities though, often overshadow the true municipal government. King of Prussia is an example of an unincorporated community that tends to be better known than Upper Merion, the municipality King of Prussia actually resides in.

==== Villages ====
Villages in Pennsylvania are often small unincorporated communities within a township. Many villages are identified by familiar PennDOT signs along a state highway even though the community has not chosen to incorporate into a borough. Lahaska is an example of typical village in eastern Pennsylvania.

==== Census-designated place ====
These are areas recognized by the United States Census Bureau for enumeration purposes. Many Census-designated places are also names of villages or post offices that tie a community together. The steep forested landscape and terrains of Pennsylvania generally forced settlements into relatively small areas that had appropriate conditions making it easy to build. Modern heavy machinery has broadened the scope of where housing settlements and business can be situated, but at the cost of moving a lot of soils and rocks.

=== Township ===
Townships in Pennsylvania were the first form of land grants established by William Penn, and are generally large in area with a sparse population centered on one or a few clusters of homes and a handful of businesses. They have existed in one form or another since the Province of Pennsylvania was established. They were usually large tracts of land given to a person, a family, or a group of people by Penn or his heirs.

Townships can be of the first or second class, the difference being the powers and offices of the municipal government or its officials. All begin as second class townships, and when certain legal requirements are met, the township may become a first-class township by a referendum of the township's voters, provided it meets population threshold requirements. Many that qualify prefer to continue as second class townships (established by voter referendum).

Representation in a second-class township is by a board of supervisors elected at-large for 6 year terms. Representation in a first-class township is by a board of commissioners that can consist of anywhere from five commissioners elected at large to boards with 7-15 elected by wards to four-year terms; though via home rule petitions, some townships have also maintained at-large representation, or mixed geographical wards and at-large election organization. By law there is always an odd number of township commissioners.

A second-class township usually has three supervisors, elected at large for six-year terms. A referendum may allow a second-class township's board of supervisors to expand to five members. Some townships have home-rule charters, which allow for a mayor/council form of government.

=== Borough ===
What outside Pennsylvania many would think are called "towns" are by law officially boroughs (often also spelled as boros) which are generally smaller than cities in terms of both geographic area and population. Most cities in Pennsylvania were once incorporated as a borough before becoming a city, and both began under the constitution as a township. Boroughs are not strictly classified by population and are administered through the borough legal code. Each borough elects a mayor and a council of three, five, seven, or nine members with broad powers, as determined by home rule measures. Some boroughs have even numbers of council members. The borough offices of tax assessor, tax collector and auditor are elected independently. The borough council can also hire a borough manager to enforce ordinances and carry out the day-to-day business of the town's administration and dictates of its council. The definition of boroughs is a town or district that is an administrative unit, in particular. Nineteen boroughs have also adopted home rule charters.

Boroughs generally incorporate from areas of dense populations in a township. The areas generally had a train station and were centers of businesses and industrial activities. The first borough to be incorporated in Pennsylvania was Germantown in 1690. That borough ceased to exist when all of Philadelphia's municipalities were consolidated in 1854. The borough of Chester Heights has a unique distinction of incorporating into a borough out of Aston Township by a tax revolt.

=== District ===
From the late 18th century until the Philadelphia Act of Consolidation in 1854, districts were politically independent municipalities made up of densely populated neighborhoods adjacent to but outside the legal boundaries of the City of Philadelphia. Northern Liberties, Southwark, and Spring Garden were among the ten largest municipalities by population in the United States.

== City ==
There are a total of 56 incorporated cities (Pennsylvania German: Schtedt, singular Schtadt) in Pennsylvania, the smallest being Parker, in Armstrong County, with a population of 840 (2010 census). Each is further classified according to population.

Class	Min. Population	Max. Population
First	1,000,000	--
Second	250,000	999,999
Second A*	80,000	249,999
Third*	--	249,999

(*): In addition to having a population between 80,000 and 249,999, a city must pass an ordinance to become a second class A city. Otherwise it is a third class city.

=== First and second class cities ===
There is one first class city, Philadelphia, which has more than 1 million residents.

There is only one second class city, Pittsburgh, which has between 250,000 and 1,000,000 residents.

A city with between 80,000 and 250,000 inhabitants that has also adopted a certain ordinance can be classified as a second class A city — only Scranton has done so.

First class, second class, and second class A cities have a strong mayor and home rule charters; their charters are in effect a bargain with the state as to which powers the city takes on itself. These sometimes include county functions. The mayor has broad power to appoint and remove certain commissioners and department heads. Most of the city's functions are independent of the state's control because of their charters, which must pass legislative approval.

=== Third class cities ===
Any municipality adopting conversion into a city government with a population below 250,000 people that has not adopted the second class ordinance is a third class city.

Third class cities can be governed three ways:

1. The third class city codes establishes a commission form of government; the mayor and four other members constitute the commission, the governing body of the city. The mayor is one of the members of council and acts as president. Each council member is in charge of one of the five major departments. The city controller and treasurer are elected independently. Twenty cities employ this form of governance.
2. The mayor-council form has a council of five, seven, or nine members, elected at large for overlapping four-year terms. A mayor, treasurer, and a controller also are elected for a four-year period. The mayor is the chief executive of the city and enforces the ordinances of council. The mayor may veto ordinances, but that can be overridden by at least two thirds of the council. The mayor supervises the work of all city departments and submits the annual city budget to council. This form was adopted by nine cities by referendums.
3. The last is the council-manager form, in which all authority is lodged with council which is composed of five, seven, or nine members elected at-large for a four-year term. A city treasurer and controller also are elected. A city manager is appointed by council. The manager is the chief administrative officer of the city and is responsible for executing the ordinances of council. The manager appoints and may remove department heads and subordinates. Only four cities use this method of city organization.

Sixteen third class cities have adopted home rule charters. Two cities (DuBois and Altoona) have an optional council-manager plan, and one city (Hazleton) has a mayor-council optional plan.

== School districts ==
There are 500 school districts in Pennsylvania, administered by the Pennsylvania Public School Code of 1949. School districts can comprise one municipality, like the School District of Philadelphia, or multiple municipalities. School districts have the sole responsibility to instruct the school-aged population of the Commonwealth. Some school districts cross one or more county lines creating challenges in equalizing property taxes because of widely varying property tax assessments. Like some other local governments, school districts are classified based on population and these classifications determine what regulations they follow.

Class	Max. Population	Min. Population
First	--	1,000,000
First A	999,999	250,000
Second	249,999	30,000
Third	29,999	5,000
Fourth	4,999	--

== Municipal authorities ==
Municipal authorities are a special kind of local unit: unlike cities, boroughs, and townships, which are general government entities, they are set up to perform special services. An authority is a body corporate and politic authorized to acquire, construct, improve, maintain, and operate projects, and to borrow money and issue bonds to finance them. Projects include public facilities such as buildings, including school buildings, transportation facilities, marketing and shopping facilities, highways, parkways, airports, parking places, waterworks, sewage treatment plants, playgrounds, hospitals, and industrial development projects.

An authority can be organized by any county, city, town, borough, township, or school district of the Commonwealth, acting singly or jointly with another municipality. An authority is established by ordinance by one or more municipalities. The governing bodies of the parent local unit or units appoint the members of the authority's board. If the body created by one unit, the board consists of five members. If the body created by two or more local units, there is at least one member from each unit but no fewer than five. The board carries on the work of the authority, acquires property, appoints officers and employees, undertakes projects, makes regulations and charges, and collects revenue from services of the facilities or projects.
