= Wilson Creek (Lackawanna River tributary) =

Wilson Creek Elk Creek

Physical characteristics
- Source
  - location: small lake in Fell Township, Lackawanna County, Pennsylvania
  - elevation: between 1,880 and 1,900 feet (570 and 580 m)
- Mouth
  - location: Lackawanna River in Fell Township, Lackawanna County, Pennsylvania
  - coordinates: 41°35′35″N 75°29′05″W
  - elevation: 1,129 ft (344 m)
- Length: 3.7 mi (6.0 km)
- Basin size: 3.82 sq mi (9.9 km^{2})

Basin features
- Progression: Lackawanna River → Susquehanna River → Chesapeake Bay

Wilson Creek (also known as Elk Creek) is a tributary of the Lackawanna River in Lackawanna County, Pennsylvania, in the United States. It is approximately 3.7 miles (6.0 km) long and flows through Fell Township. The watershed of the creek has an area of 3.82 square miles (9.9 km^{2}). The creek is impaired by metals and pH from abandoned mine drainage. Some reaches of it also experience total flow loss. There are three discharges of acid mine drainage entering the creek: the Upper Wilson Outfall, the Lower Wilson Outfall, and the Molensky Slope Outfall. The watershed of the creek is in the Appalachian Mountain section of the Ridge and Valley physiographic province. The main rock types in the watershed are interbedded sedimentary rock and sandstone. The creek flows past areas of disturbed mining land.

Wilson Creek is a first-order stream with a relatively narrow watershed. The watershed is mostly forested, with the upper reaches being largely undeveloped. Other land uses include abandoned mine lands, developed lands, and open fields. Various coal mines, breakers, and collieries historically existed in the creek's vicinity. Additionally, a number of bridges have been constructed across the creek. Wilson Creek is designated as a Coldwater Fishery and a Migratory Fishery. Wild trout naturally reproduce in the creek, but it has a low concentration of macroinvertebrates, as of the early 1990s. A possible greenway/trail along the creek could provide a link between the communities of Simpson and Richmondale.

== Course ==
Wilson Creek begins in a small lake in Fell Township, near the Lackawanna County/Susquehanna County line. It flows east-southeast for a few tenths of a mile before passing through another lake, turning southeast, and flowing down a slope. Several tenths of a mile further downstream, the creek turns south-southwest for several tenths of a mile, flowing between the base of a mountain and Pennsylvania Route 171. It then turns south for a few tenths of a mile before very briefly turning east and crossing Pennsylvania Route 171. The creek then turns south for more than a mile, still flowing alongside Pennsylvania Route 171. It eventually enters Simpson and turns south-southwest. After a short distance, it turns south for several tenths of a mile before turning southeast and reaching its confluence with the Lackawanna River.

Wilson Creek joins the Lackawanna River 30.82 miles (49.60 km) upriver of its mouth.

== Hydrology ==
Wilson Creek is designated as an impaired stream. The causes of the impairment are metals and pH. The likely source of the impairment is abandoned mine drainage. In 1996 and 1998, 0.6 miles (0.97 km) were impaired, while in 2002 and 2004, 4 miles (6.4 km) were impaired. Reaches of Wilson Creek experience total flow loss. A loss of base flow in the stream was observed at the Richmondale Pile in September 2000.

In 2002, the discharge of Wilson Creek in its upper reaches ranged from 73 to 1,130 US gal (280 to 4,280 L) per minute, with an average of 534 US gal (2,020 L) per minute. In the creek's middle reaches, it ranged from 0 to 3,580 US gal (13,600 L) per minute, with an average of 1,700 US gal (6,400 L) per minute. In its lower reaches, the discharge ranged from 3,460 to 12,370 US gal (13,100 to 46,800 L) per minute, with an average of 6,870 US gal (26,000 L) per minute.

In 2002, the concentration of iron in Wilson Creek ranged from less than 0.30 milligrams per liter to 0.39 milligrams per liter in the creek's upper reaches. In its middle reaches, the iron concentration was less than 0.30 milligrams per liter and in its lower reaches, it ranged from 0.01 to less than 0.30 milligrams per liter. In 2002, the concentration of manganese in Wilson Creek ranged from less than 0.05 milligrams per liter to 0.12 milligrams per liter in the creek's upper reaches. In its middle reaches, the manganese concentration was less than 0.050 milligrams per liter and in its lower reaches, it ranged from 0.02 to less than 0.12 milligrams per liter. In 2002, the concentration of aluminum in Wilson Creek was less than 0.5 milligrams per liter in its upper and middle reaches. In its lower reaches, the aluminum concentration ranged from 0.01 to 0.15 milligrams per liter.

In its upper reaches, the concentration of acidity in Wilson Creek ranged from 0 to 31 milligrams per liter, with an average of 21 milligrams per liter. The concentration of alkalinity ranged from 10.4 to 17.8 milligrams per liter, with an average of 13.2 milligrams per liter. The pH ranged from 5.8 to 6.7, with an average of 6.1. In its middle reaches, the concentration of acidity in the creek ranged from 0.8 to 22.0 milligrams per liter, with an average of 10.5 milligrams per liter. The concentration of alkalinity ranged from 8.6 to 15.0 milligrams per liter, with an average of 10.5 milligrams per liter. The pH ranged from 5.6 to 6.2, with an average of 6.0. In its lower reaches, the concentration of acidity in Wilson Creek ranged from 0 to 2 milligrams per liter, with an average of 0.25 milligrams per liter. The concentration of alkalinity ranged from 32 to 44 milligrams per liter, with an average of 37 milligrams per liter. The pH ranged from 5.9 to 6.9, with an average of 6.3.

There are three discharges of acid mine drainage that flow into Wilson Creek: the Upper Wilson Outfall, the Lower Wilson Outfall, and the Molensky Slope Outfall. The first was found to have almost no flow, the second was found to have a flow of 10 gallons per minute, and the third was found to have a flow of 80 gallons per minute. The last of these accounts for most of the flow that Wilson Creek contributes to the Lackawanna River. The water from this outfall has a slightly sulfuric odor, but has low concentrations of metals. In the early 1900s, the creek had no culm at its mouth, but did have high concentrations of sulfur. The creek also historically carried some silt.

== Geography and geology ==
The elevation near the mouth of Wilson Creek is 1,129 feet (344 m) above sea level. The elevation of the creek's source is between 1,880 and 1,900 feet (570 and 580 m) above sea level.

The watershed of Wilson Creek is in the Appalachian Mountain section of the Ridge and Valley physiographic province. The topography of the watershed mainly consists of long, steep ridges with valleys interspersed. This is similar to the topography of the Lackawanna River watershed as a whole, but on a smaller scale. The creek has a defined channel. Various small bogs, ponds, and wetlands are in the watershed.

The headwaters of Wilson Creek are in a wetland pond. The first 1 mile (1.6 km) of the creek are largely unimpacted, with an intact stream corridor. However, it eventually begins to flow alongside Pennsylvania Route 171, where it receives impacts from stripping pits and waste rock piles left over from past mining operations. The creek is also impacted by Pennsylvania Route 171 itself in this reach. Around the time that it begins flowing alongside Pennsylvania Route 171, it passes through the Richmondale Pile, an area of disturbed mining land with some culm. The creek has been channelized near its mouth.

A report from the early 1900s noted that the streambed of Wilson Creek was rocky in certain reaches, with culm deposits of up to 10 to 12 square feet (0.93 to 1.11 m^{2}) in area. The report also stated that the creek was fairly large, with banks high enough to avoid overflowing in most reaches.

The uplands of the watershed of Wilson Creek lie on poorly-drained, rocky soil. The other parts of the watershed have rapid permeability. Interbedded sedimentary rock is the most common type of rock in the watershed, occupying 53 percent of its area. The remaining 47 percent is occupied by sandstone.

== Watershed ==
The watershed of Wilson Creek has an area of 3.82 square miles (9.9 km^{2}). The mouth of the creek is in the United States Geological Survey quadrangle of Waymart. However, its source is in the quadrangle of Clifford.

Wilson Creek is a first-order stream. The watershed is relatively narrow. The vast majority of the creek's drainage basin is in Fell Township. However, a small part of the northernmost reach is in Clifford Township, in Susquehanna County. The upper reaches of the creek's watershed are largely undeveloped. However, residential land lines the creek in Simpson. A total of 84 percent of the watershed is forested. The remaining 16 percent consists of abandoned mine lands, developed lands (which are mostly concentrated near the creek's mouth), and open fields.

Wilson Creek can be accessed by taking US Route 6 to Carbondale and then taking Pennsylvania Route 171 to Simpson.

== History and recreation ==
Wilson Creek was entered into the Geographic Names Information System on August 2, 1979. Its identifier in the Geographic Names Information System is 1191536. The creek is also known as Elk Creek. This name appears on county highway maps published by the Pennsylvania Department of Transportation.

The Williams Coal Mine was constructed on Wilson Creek by J.W. Williams and J.P. Williams in 1864. The Elk Creek Mine was constructed along the creek in 1873 by Clarkson and Brennan. Their breakers were built in 1874 and 1873, respectively. Additionally, the Richmond Number 4 Colliery was historically located near the creek's headwaters and the Buffalo Breaker was also in the watershed. Wilson Creek overflowed its banks during a 1924 flood. During the same flood, the creek inundated a road to Forest City, rendering it impassible.

A concrete stringer/multi-beam or girder bridge carrying T604/Midland Street was constructed across Wilson Creek in 1930. It is 32.2 feet (9.8 m) long. A steel stringer/multi-beam or girder bridge carrying Pennsylvania Route 171 was constructed over the creek in 1953. This bridge is 46.9 feet (14.3 m) long and is situated in Fell Township.

Wilson Creek was given a stream ranking of "Moderate" in the Lackawanna Valley Industrial Highway Project's Environmental Impact Statement in 1992.

In the early 2000s, the Lackawanna River Watershed Conservation Plan proposed the Wilson Creek Trail. A greenway and trail along the creek could link Simpson and Richmondale. The Lackawanna River Watershed Conservation Plan also recommended that Fell Township include protection of Wilson Creek in its comprehensive plans, as well as their ordinances for land use, zoning, and subdivision. The creek is on the Watershed Restoration Priority List of the Lackawanna River Corridor Association. In 2006, the Lackawanna County Conservation District received a letter of support for a Growing Greener grant for a Wilson Creek Watershed Implementation Plan.

== Biology ==
The drainage basin of Wilson Creek is designated as a Coldwater Fishery and a Migratory Fishery. Wild trout naturally reproduce in Wilson Creek from its headwaters downstream to its mouth. As of the early 1990s, the creek has a low density of macroinvertebrates.

Native trees and understory plants occur in the riparian buffer of Wilson Creek upstream of Pennsylvania Route 171. There is successional vegetation along the creek at the Richmondale Pile. In Simpson, the vegetation alongside the creek is either mowed or consists of successional and invasive understory plants.

== See also ==
- Coal Brook, next tributary of the Lackawanna River going downriver
- Rogers Brook, next tributary of the Lackawanna River going upriver
- List of rivers of Pennsylvania
- List of tributaries of the Lackawanna River
