= Pennsylvania Route 171 =

State highway in Lackawanna and Susquehanna counties in Pennsylvania, United States

Pennsylvania Route 171
- PA 171 highlighted in red

Route information
- Maintained by PennDOT
- Length: 40.170 mi (64.647 km)
- Existed: April 1961–present

Major junctions
- South end: US 6 Bus. in Carbondale
- PA 247 in Forest City; PA 374 / PA 371 in Herrick Township; PA 370 in Ararat Township; PA 92 in Susquehanna Depot; I-81 in Great Bend Township
- North end: US 11 in Great Bend

Location
- Country: United States
- State: Pennsylvania
- Counties: Lackawanna, Susquehanna

Highway system
- Pennsylvania State Route System; Interstate; US; State; Scenic; Legislative
← PA 170	→ PA 172
← I-70	PA 70	→ PA 71
← PA 601	PA 602	→ PA 604
← PA 690	PA 692	→ I-695

Pennsylvania Route 171 (PA 171, also designated by the Pennsylvania Department of Transportation as SR 0171) is a 40.17-mile-long (64.65 km) north–south state highway located in northeast Pennsylvania. The southern terminus of the route is at U.S. Route 6 Business (US 6 Bus.) in Carbondale. The northern terminus is officially at an intersection with US 11, 250 feet (76 m) to the west of Interstate 81 (I-81).

PA 171, at its southern end, was once part of the Providence and Carbondale Turnpike, a turnpike which ran along US 6 Bus. from Dickson City to Carbondale and PA 171 from Carbondale to Forest City. The turnpike, chartered in 1851, ran from Scranton until being abandoned in 1889. In 1911, after the Sproul Road Bill was signed, a large segment of PA 171 was designated as Legislative Route 10. This was its designation for several years, and in 1928, the mass amount of state highways in Pennsylvania were designated.

In the 1928 renumbering, the alignments of PA 171 were designated as Pennsylvania Route 70, Pennsylvania Route 602, and Pennsylvania Route 692, which stretched the highway from US 6/US 106 in Carbondale to the New York state line at Hallstead. In 1946, PA 692 and PA 602 were later removed from the state system and replaced by an extended PA 70. In 1961, PA 70 was renumbered as PA 171 to prevent duplication with I-70.

== Route description ==
=== Carbondale to Herrick Center ===
PA 171 begins at an intersection with US 6 Bus. in the eastern part of the city of Carbondale. The route progresses northward, along Belmont Street, passing several homes for several blocks. At an intersection with Spencer Street, the highway leaves downtown Carbondale and enters Fell Township, a nearby community. There, PA 171 changes names to Main Street, passing more residential homes and local businesses, until entering the community of Simpson. At Reservoir Street, PA 171 turns northward and leaves Simpson. After an intersection with Owego Street, PA 171 leaves Fell Township and becomes parallel to the Owego Turnpike through a residential community surrounded by forests.

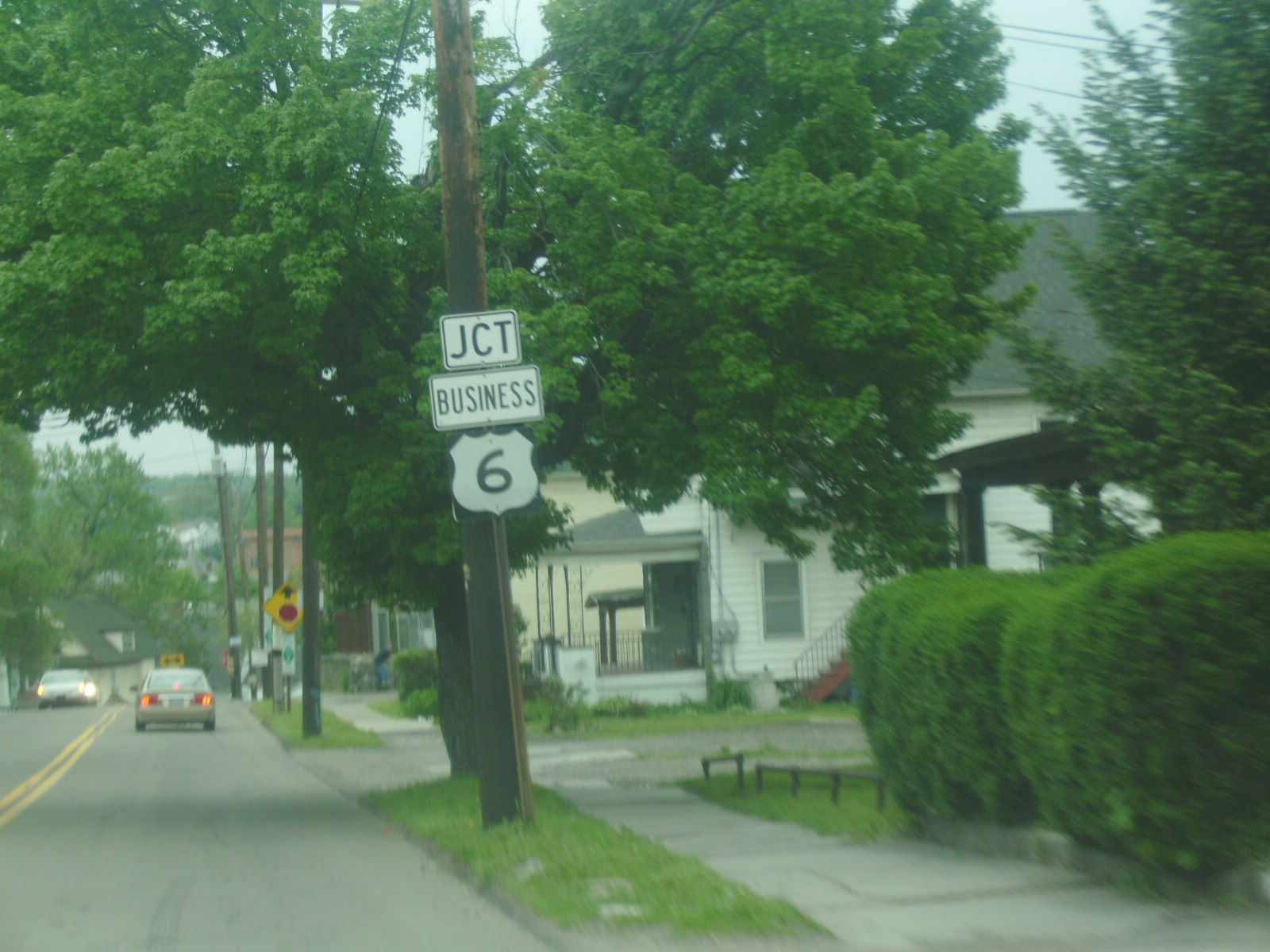
PA 171 approaching the southern terminus at US 6 Bus. in Carbondale

After about a mile, PA 171 turns away from the residential and commercial buildings and winds through the local woodlands. This scenery continues for several miles, passing by a reservoir. After an intersection with Buffalo Road, the road turns to the northeast. After the turn, PA 171 enters the community of Richmondale. In Richmondale, the highway heads eastward, the development of the scenery around the highway once again. After leaving Richmondale, the highway enters the borough of Vandling, where the highway becomes highly developed. After an intersection with Clinton Street, PA 171 leaves Vandling and crosses into Susquehanna County, where the highway enters the borough of Forest City.

PA 171 continues into Forest City, where it curves along as Main Street, and enters downtown. In downtown Forest City, the highway is squeezed to two local lanes and PA 171 intersects with PA 247, which heads eastward. However, PA 247 westbound becomes concurrent with PA 171 through downtown Forest City, and the highway eventually splits off westbound, while PA 171 continues north through the northern ends of Forest City. The route bends around for a while in Forest City, where at an intersection with Cemetery Road, the route leaves the community.

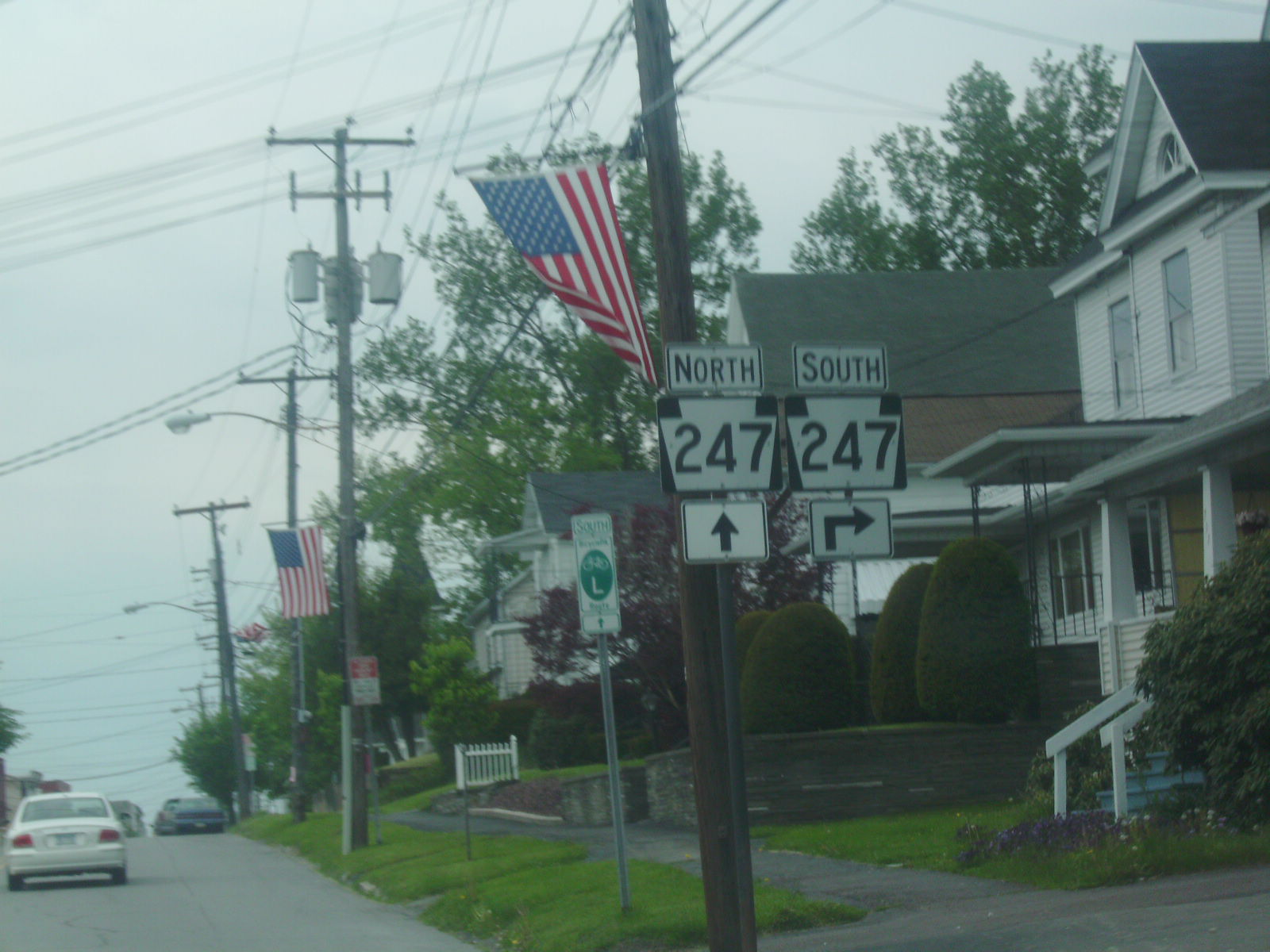
PA 171 and PA 247 head in the community of Forest City

North of Forest City, PA 171 heads north for several miles through deep forests. After a while, PA 171 crosses over the Lackawanna River, which straddles the Wayne County border. The route, at that point, changes names to Stillwater Road, parallelling Old Logging Road 296 until approaching Stillwater Lake, where the logging road merges back into the highway. PA 171 parallels the shores of Stillwater Lake and passes the Stillwater Dam, maintained by the U.S. Army Corps of Engineers. While PA 171 continues to follow the lake, it enters the borough of Union Dale.

PA 171 enters Union Dale, leaving forests that it was following. The route intersects and parallels Mausoleum Road, which heads through a cemetery in southern Union Dale. After an intersection with Asley Drive, Stillwater Lake ends, and the community enters the center of Union Dale. The center consists of an intersection with Skyline Drive, and PA 171 leaves. The highway continues out of Union Dale, winding its way to the north. PA 171 continues running as Stillwater Road into the deep forests which break up soon after.

A short distance later, PA 171 becomes slightly developed, entering the small community of Herrick Center. There, the highway intersects with the eastern terminus of PA 374 and the western terminus of PA 371, also known as the Great Bend Turnpike. The route leaves Herrick Center and heads northward through rural parts of Susquehanna County.

=== Thompson to Oakland ===
After leaving Herrick Center and PA 371/PA 374, PA 171 progresses through Susquehanna County, leaving Stillwater Road. The route continues through the rural parts of Susquehanna County. After a break in a patch of trees, PA 171 intersects with Township Road 592, beginning a wind along the Wayne County border. The township road parallels for sometime, and the highways eventually enters the small community of Burnwood, where the highway becomes slightly developed. North of Burnwood, the route continues northward, entering the community of East Ararat, where PA 370's western terminus is located.

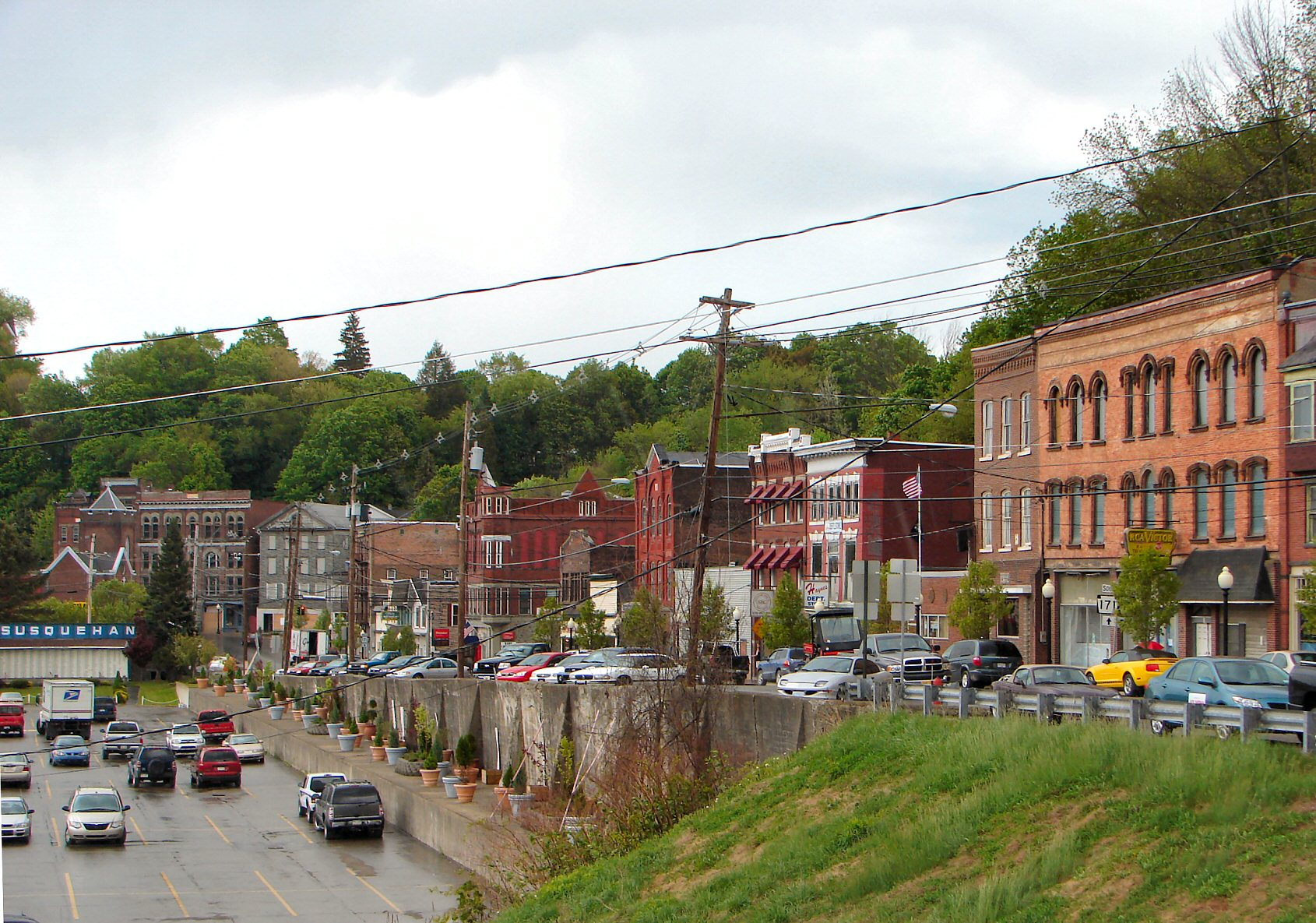
PA 171 seen from the former Erie Railroad Susquehanna shops in Susquehanna Depot

The route passes through East Ararat, leaving soon after. After that, PA 171 begins to progress through the rural areas once again, paralleling a short distance of PA 370. After an intersection with Borden Hollow Road, the highway progresses through a deep area of forests. The route passes Dunn Pond, where it bends to the northwest, entering Ararat Township. Along this stretch, PA 171 passes to the north of the community of Ararat. The route continues for several miles, and after turning to the east, the highway enters the borough of Thompson. Into the borough of Thompson, PA 171 becomes known as Jackson Street and heads through a moderately developed region. The route, at an intersection with Main Street, leaves Jackson and continues northward. After the intersection with Erie Avenue, PA 171 leaves Thompson. A short distance later, the highway continues northward through deep forests and rural farms before continuing into Thompson Township. After that the road starts winding its way northward, it returns to the unpopulated area and intersects with local roads.

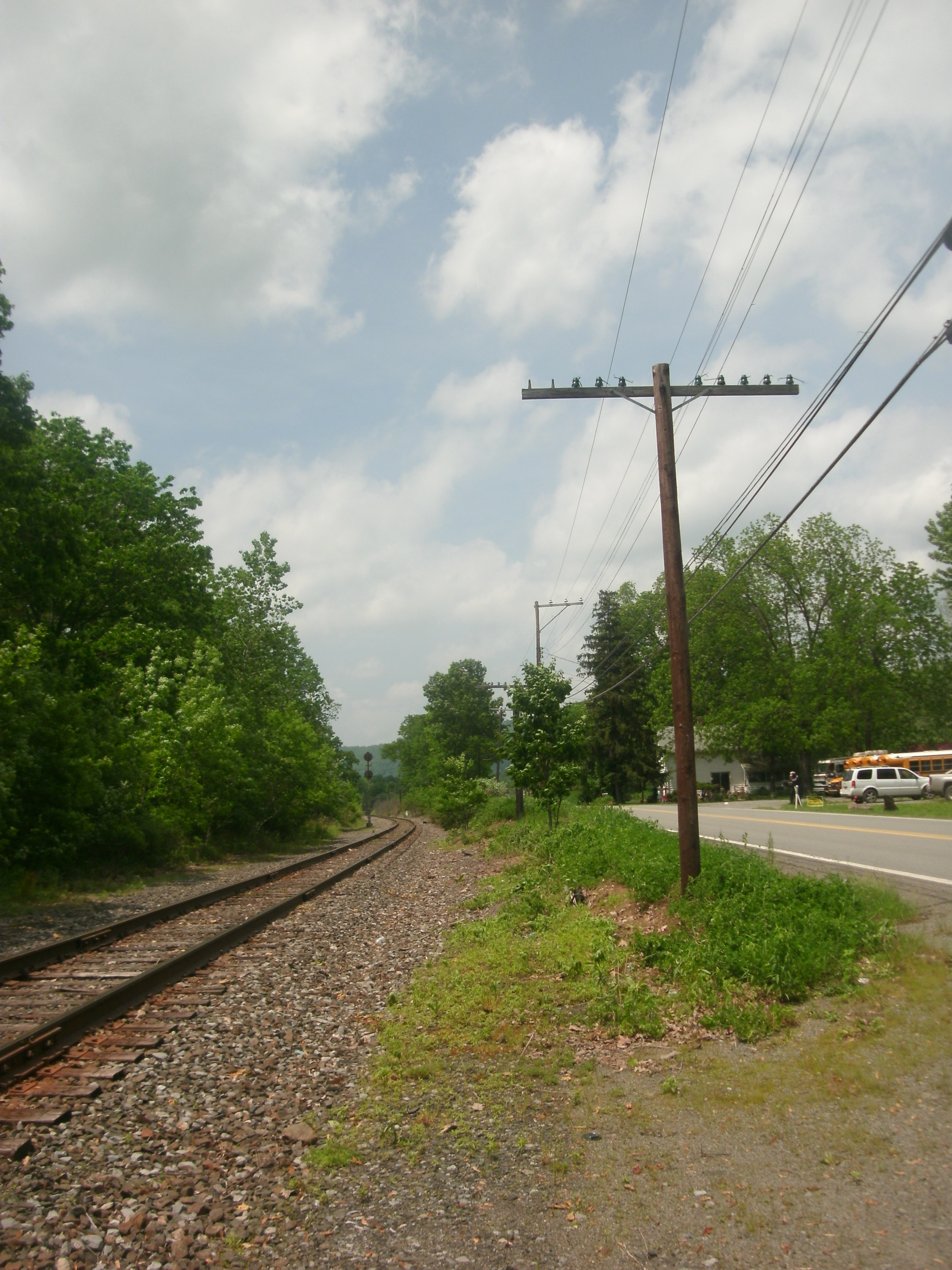
PA 171 running to the right alongside the former Erie Railroad's Susquehanna Division main line in Hickory Grove

This pattern continues for several miles, with PA 171 passing a large pond and deep forests. At the intersection with Comforts Pond Road and Bethels Hill Road, the highway becomes slightly developed. This quickly reverts to the undeveloped rural farms, which follow PA 171 along its trip to the northwest. A short distance later, the highway becomes surrounded by forests once again, beginning to wind its way as the Belmont Turnpike. The forests quickly ends, and the surroundings become highly developed as the community enters the borough of Lanesboro. After entering Lanesboro, PA 171 becomes highly developed and continues as Belmont Turnpike until the intersection with Main Street, where the highway turns to the southwest. The route heads along Main Street, progressing along the developed parts of the Susquehanna River, and enters the borough of Susquehanna Depot. In Susquehanna Depot, PA 171 runs along East Main Street through the eastern segment of the community. Near the dead-end Jackson Street, the highway turns to the south, intersecting with PA 92. From there, the two highways are concurrent.

PA 92 and PA 171 head along Main Street, passing some local businesses and residences before crossing the Susquehanna River on the Susquehanna County Veterans Memorial Bridge into the borough of Oakland. After crossing the bridge, PA 171 and PA 92 split onto State Street and River Street respectively. PA 171 continues westward, paralleling High Street, which merges in along the shores of the Susquehanna. Soon after the intersection with High Street, PA 171 progresses westward leaving Oakland soon after.

=== Hickory Grove to Great Bend ===
After leaving Susquehanna Depot and Oakland Township, PA 171 heads on a westward progression along the Susquehanna River. To the south of the highway is the river, to the north of the highway is residential homes and deep forests behind those. After the intersection with Towner Road, PA 171 enters the small community of Hickory Grove, where the route and river makes a curve to the southwest, still paralleling each other. PA 171 quickly leaves Hickory Grove and enters another set of deep forests which separate the highway and the river.

The highway continues on its southwest progression, with the trees surrounding dissipating. After that, both the river and the highway pass to the north of Island Plain. There, the routes curve to the northwest once again, becoming more developed and now following a railroad line in the area. The route makes a curve to the west, progressing through a short development of residential homes. After that, the highway enters the borough of Great Bend and heads to the southwest. The designation crosses at Interchange 230 along I-81 in downtown Great Bend, but continues to the intersection with US 11 in Great Bend, where the route terminates.

== History ==
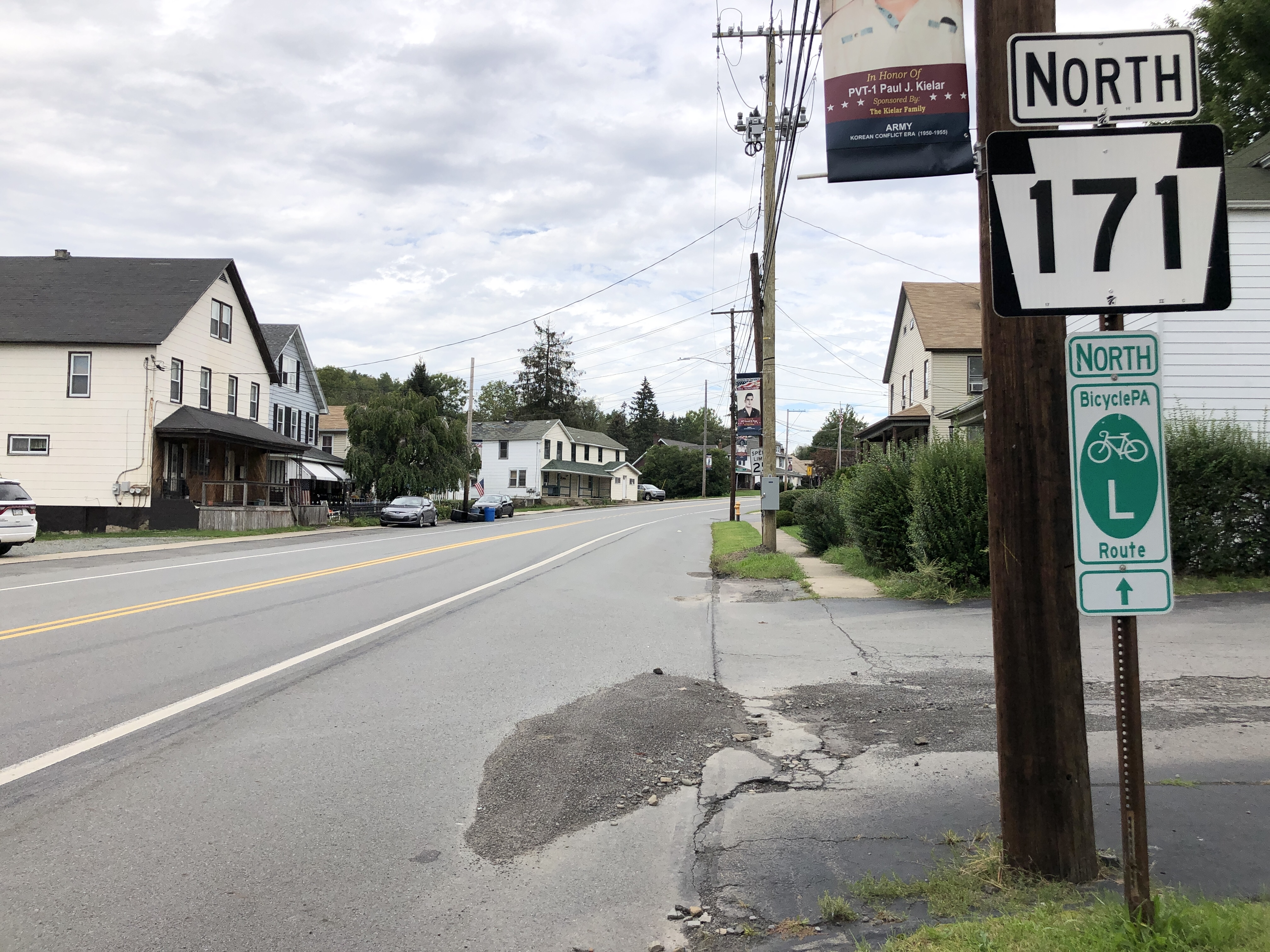
PA 171 northbound in Simpson

=== Pre-designation turnpikes ===
A short segment of PA 171, from Carbondale to the community of Forest City, was part of the Providence and Carbondale Turnpike, a turnpike which went from the city of Scranton, Pennsylvania, following much of US 6 and US 106 (current day US 6 Bus.) through many of the communities in the area: Dickson City, Jermyn, and Carbondale, before turning onto current day PA 171. There, the turnpike followed the alignment through Carbondale, Fell Township, Vandling and into Forest City, where it ended, 20 miles (32 km) from Scranton. This tolled turnpike provided the main highway through many of the communities, including the towns along PA 171, until on December 7, 1889, when local citizens tore down the abandoned tollbooths in Blakely. Originally, the turnpike was chartered by the commonwealth of Pennsylvania in 1851, and remained strong until 1889, the year the tollbooths were torn down. After that the turnpike was abandoned, with control of the turnpike's alignment turned over Lackawanna County for future maintenance.

In 1897, the portion of PA 171 along Main Street in Susquehanna Depot was paved. The project to pave the main highway cost $10,000 (equivalent to $387,000 in 2025) with funds split equally between the borough of Susquehanna Depot, the local businesses, and the nearby Erie Railroad.

=== Designation ===
Pennsylvania Route 70
- Location: Carbondale–Great Bend
- Existed: 1928–1961

The original route designation that follows current-day PA 171 was a part of Legislative Route 10, which ran from an intersection with Legislative Route 9 (currently an intersection with PA 706) in New Milford Township to the New York state line, where it follows current day PA 92's alignment. In 1928, the alignment of PA 171 was designated as Pennsylvania Route 70 from US 6 in Carbondale to Oakland at PA 92, from there to US 11 in Great Bend, it was designated as PA 692, and from US 11 to the New York state line at Hallstead, it was designated as PA 602.

The alignment of PA 70 was under construction in 1929 from the Thompson Township line to Lanesboro. It was completed the next year, when the Pennsylvania Department of Highways paved the highway from Herrick Center to Thompson and Stack Road to the Harmony Township line. These three routes remained intact (in terms of alignment) for eighteen years, until 1946, when PA 692 and PA 602 were removed from the state highway system in favor of extending PA 70 to the north to Hallstead. The route, PA 70, remained intact for another seventeen years, when in April 1961, I-70 was already commissioned, and PA 70 was decommissioned. The PA 70 designation was renumbered to PA 171 to prevent duplication.

== Major intersections ==
County	Location	mi	km	Destinations	Notes
Lackawanna	Carbondale	0.000	0.000	US 6 Bus. (Canaan Street / Church Street)	Southern terminus
Susquehanna	Forest City	6.127	9.860	PA 247 north (Main Street) – Browndale, Creamton	South end of PA 247 overlap
Susquehanna	Forest City	6.516	10.486	PA 247 south (Dundaff Street)	North end of PA 247 overlap
Susquehanna	Herrick Township	13.097	21.078	PA 371 east / PA 374 west (Old Newburg Turnpike)	Western terminus of PA 371; eastern terminus of PA 374
Susquehanna	Ararat Township	16.632	26.767	PA 370 east	Western terminus of PA 370
Susquehanna	Susquehanna Depot	31.548	50.772	PA 92 south (Franklin Avenue)	South end of PA 92 overlap
Susquehanna	Oakland	31.916	51.364	PA 92 north (River Street)	North end of PA 92 overlap
Susquehanna	Great Bend Township	40.068– 40.085	64.483– 64.511	I-81 – Scranton, Binghamton	Exit 230 (I-81)
Susquehanna	Great Bend Township	40.170	64.647	US 11 – Hallstead, Great Bend	Northern terminus
1.000 mi = 1.609 km; 1.000 km = 0.621 mi: Concurrency terminus
