= Pennsylvania Route 374 =

State highway in Susquehanna County, Pennsylvania, US

Pennsylvania Route 374

Route information
- Maintained by PennDOT
- Length: 17.709 mi (28.500 km)
- Existed: April 1961–present

Major junctions
- West end: PA 92 in Lenox Township
- PA 407 in Lenox Township; I-81 in Lenox Township; PA 106 in Clifford Township
- East end: PA 171 / PA 371 in Herrick Township

Location
- Country: United States
- State: Pennsylvania
- Counties: Susquehanna

Highway system
- Pennsylvania State Route System; Interstate; US; State; Scenic; Legislative
← PA 372	→ I-376

Pennsylvania Route 374 (PA 374) is a 17.7-mile-long (28.5 km) state highway located in Susquehanna County, Pennsylvania. The western terminus is at PA 92 in the community of Glenwood in Lenox Township. The eastern terminus is at PA 171 and PA 371 in the community of Herrick Center near Union Dale in Herrick Township. The route is a two-lane undivided road that passes through rural areas of farms and woods in southern Susquehanna County. PA 374 intersects PA 407 and Interstate 81 (I-81) in Lenox Township and forms a concurrency with PA 106 in Clifford Township.

The portion of the route between Dimock Corners and Herrick Center was originally a private turnpike called the Cohecton and Great Bend Turnpike that was chartered in 1804 and completed in 1811. The current alignment of the route was paved in the 1930s and 1940s. Between the 1930s and 1954, the section between Dimock Corners and Herrick Center was designated as part of PA 371. PA 374 was created in April 1961 as one of five state highways designated to interchange with the newly constructed I-81. The route originally ran between PA 92 in Glenwood and U.S. Route 106 (US 106, now PA 106) in Royal. PA 374 was extended east to its current terminus in the 1980s.

== Route description ==
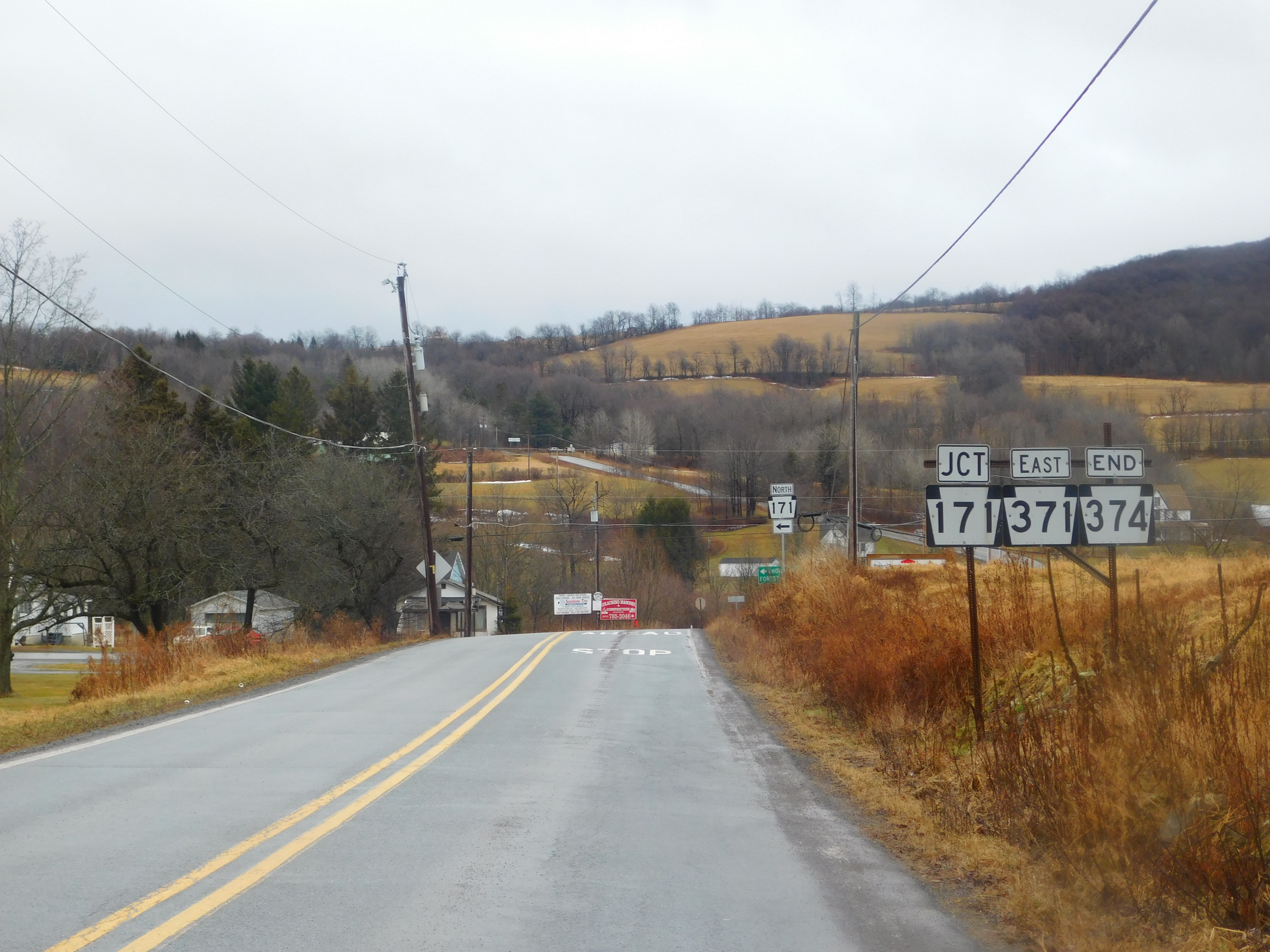
PA 374 approaching its eastern terminus at PA 171 and PA 371 in Herrick Center

PA 374 begins at an intersection with PA 92 in the community of Glenwood in Lenox Township, heading east on a two-lane undivided road. The route crosses the Tunkhannock Creek and heads into farmland before heading into forested areas to the north of the East Branch Tunkhannock Creek and intersecting the northern terminus of PA 407. The road continues through forests with some homes and heads across the creek. PA 374 runs south of the East Branch Tunkhannock Creek and comes to a partial cloverleaf interchange with I-81. Past this interchange, the road heads northeast through more wooded areas with some residences, crossing into Clifford Township. The route runs through areas of fields and woods with a few homes, coming to an intersection with PA 106 in Royal. At this point, PA 374 turns north for a concurrency with PA 106, passing through a mix of farmland and woodland with occasional residences. In West Clifford, PA 374 splits from PA 106 by heading northeast on Brooklyn Street, passing through more rural areas. The route turns north onto an unnamed road and passes through forests before turning northeast and heading through woodland with some farm fields and homes. PA 374 passes through a corner of Gibson Township before entering Herrick Township and turning east onto Brace Road.

The road runs through more farms and woods with some residences, passing to the north of Elk Mountain Ski Area. The route turns north onto Lyon Street and passing through more rural areas. PA 374 turns east onto Old Newburg Turnpike in Dimock Corners and passes through more agricultural and wooded areas with homes, heading through Herrick Center before ending at PA 171. East of here, the road continues as PA 371.

== History ==
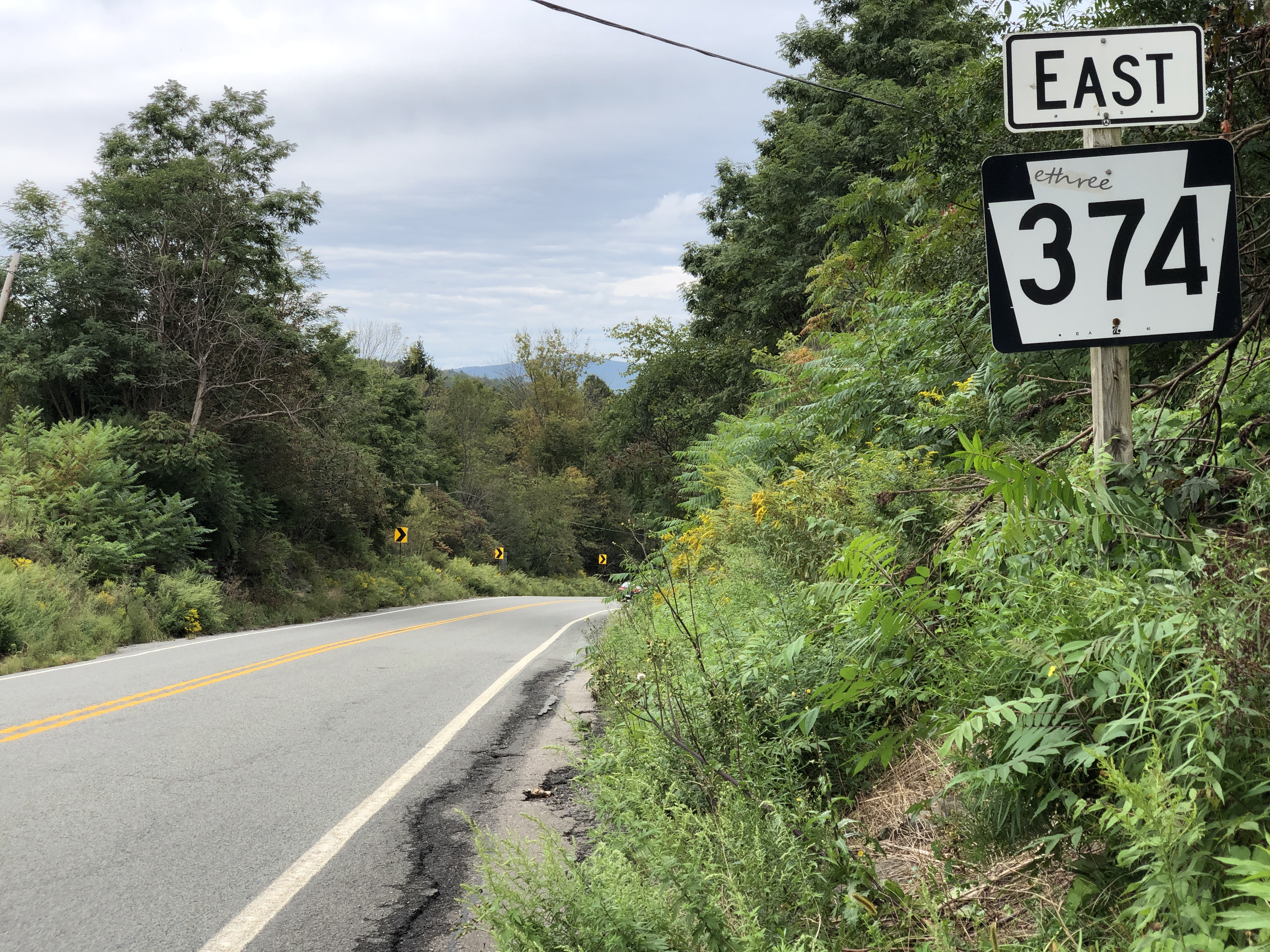
PA 374 eastbound past I-81 in Lenox Township

The portion of PA 374 between Dimock Corners and Herrick Center was chartered as a private turnpike called the Cohecton and Great Bend Turnpike on March 29, 1804. This turnpike was planned to run between Damascus Mills and the summit of Moosic Mountain. The Cohecton and Great Bend Turnpike was completed in 1811. The turnpike, along with the Newburgh and Cochecton Turnpike, served as the main route between Newburgh, New York, and Western New York. Traffic along the Cohecton and Great Bend Turnpike was reduced by both the completion of the Erie Canal and the Erie Railroad. When Pennsylvania first legislated routes in 1911, what is now PA 374 was not given a number. By 1930, the section of the current route between US 106 (now PA 106) in West Clifford and PA 70 (now PA 171) in Herrick Center was an unnumbered, unpaved road. The road between PA 92 in Glenwood and US 106 in Royal was paved in the 1930s. In addition, the section along Old Newburg Turnpike was designated as part of PA 371 in the 1930s, which was paved.

By 1941, the roadway was paved between US 106 in West Clifford and PA 371 in Dimock Corners. The PA 371 designation along the road between Dimock Corners and Herrick Center was removed in 1954. PA 374 was designated in April 1961 as part of a decision to designate several new traffic routes to interchange with I-81 (the Penn-Can Highway), which had been recently constructed. When created, the route ran from PA 92 in Glenwood east to US 106 in Royal. PA 374 was extended east to PA 171/PA 371 in Herrick Center in the 1980s.

== Major intersections ==
The entire route is in Susquehanna County.

Location	mi	km	Destinations	Notes
Lenox Township	0.000	0.000	PA 92	Western terminus
Lenox Township	0.838	1.349	PA 407 south	Northern terminus of PA 407
Lenox Township	3.539– 3.561	5.695– 5.731	I-81 – Scranton, Binghamton	Exit 206 on I-81
Clifford Township	6.007	9.667	PA 106 east – Carbondale	West end of PA 106 overlap
Clifford Township	7.301	11.750	PA 106 west – Kingsley	East end of PA 106 overlap
Herrick Township	17.709	28.500	PA 171 (Still Water Road) / PA 371 east (Old Newburg Turnpike) – Forest City, Thompson	Eastern terminus; western terminus of PA 371
1.000 mi = 1.609 km; 1.000 km = 0.621 mi: Concurrency terminus
