= Coal Brook =

Stream in Pennsylvania, United States

Coordinates: 41°35′06″N 75°29′52″W

Physical characteristics
- Source
  - location: mountain in Fell Township, Lackawanna County, Pennsylvania
  - elevation: between 1,700 and 1,720 feet (520 and 520 m)
- Mouth
  - location: Lackawanna River in Carbondale, Lackawanna County, Pennsylvania
  - elevation: 1,083 ft (330 m)
- Length: 2.2 mi (3.5 km)
- Basin size: 1.93 mi^{2} (5.0 km^{2})

Basin features
- Progression: Lackawanna River → Susquehanna River → Chesapeake Bay

Coal Brook is a tributary of the Lackawanna River in Lackawanna County, Pennsylvania, in the United States. It is approximately 2.2 miles (3.5 km) long and flows through Fell Township and Carbondale. The watershed of the stream has an area of 1.93 square miles (5.0 km^{2}). The stream experiences flow loss and is impaired by flow alterations and metals. Most of its length is heavily impacted by past mining and the lower reaches are in an underground culvert. The Coal Brook Colliery was historically in the stream's watershed. Coal Brook is a first-order stream and is designated as a Coldwater Fishery and a Migratory Fishery.

== Course ==
Coal Brook begins on a mountain in Fell Township. It flows south-southeast for several tenths of a mile before turning east for several hundred feet. The stream then turns south for approximately a mile before entering Carbondale. At this point, it turns southeast. A few tenths of a mile further downstream, it reaches its confluence with the Lackawanna River.

Coal Book joins the Lackawanna River 29.76 miles (47.89 km) upriver of its mouth.

== Hydrology ==
Coal Brook is designated as an impaired stream. The causes of the impairment are flow alterations and metals. The likely source of the impairment is abandoned mine drainage.

Coal Brook experiences total flow loss. In the 1990s, the stream has "very low flow". However, a comprehensive restoration project could restore flow and a natural channel to Coal Brook. In October 2000, stream flow disappeared in a reach upstream of Dundaff Road.

Stormwater pipes from Carbondale drain into Coal Brook in the reach where it flows through an underground culvert. Leaking sewer pipes also drain into the stream in this reach. In the early 1900s, the mouth of the stream was free of culm. However, its flow was colored white by sulfur-contaminated water from the Coal Brook Colliery. A stream of mine water entered the stream at one point and culm banks in its vicinity were subject to wash. Nevertheless, its upper reaches were clear.

== Geography and geology ==
The elevation near the mouth of Coal Brook is 1,083 feet (330 m) above sea level. The elevation of the stream's source is between 1,700 and 1,720 feet (520 and 520 m) above sea level.

Coal Brook flows through coal mining lands. Only the uppermost 0.4 miles (0.64 km) of its length have avoided being impacted; they are above the coal measures. From Dundaff Road to a point 1.3 miles (2.1 km) downstream, the stream flows through areas of culm, waste rock, and strip pits from the old Coal Brook Colliery. Small bogs, ponds, and wetlands are in the stream's watershed. Its headwaters are in mountain springs.

Upon reaching the Carbondale Nursing Home, Coal Brook enters an underground culvert. Its course is not exactly known in this reach. However, it discharges into the Lackawanna River via a pipe.

Some reaches of Coal Brook have been entirely destroyed either by historic mining or by post-mining development. Additionally, substantial deposits of culm and silts from mining operations line occur in the stream's vicinity. The stream does not run through drift, but rather through solid rock. Its course is largely determined by the rocks' structure.

== Watershed ==
The watershed of Coal Brook has an area of 1.93 square miles (5.0 km^{2}). The mouth of the stream is in the United States Geological Survey quadrangle of Waymart. However, its source is in the quadrangle of Carbondale.

Coal Brook is a first-order stream. Dundaff Road is slightly to the east of its headwaters.

== History ==
Coal Brook was entered into the Geographic Names Information System on August 2, 1979. Its identifier in the Geographic Names Information System is 1172047.

The Coal Brook Colliery historically operated in the watershed of Coal Brook. It was owned by the Delaware and Hudson Coal Company. In a reach of Coal Brook upstream of Dundaff Road, the Bureau of Abandoned Mine Reclamation once completed a reclamation project, filling stripping pits and regrading waste rock.

In the early 2000s, the Lackawanna River Watershed Conservation Plan also recommended that Carbondale Township and Carbondale include protection of Coal Brook in their comprehensive plans, as well as their ordinances for land use, zoning, and subdivision. The stream is on the Watershed Restoration Priority List of the Lackawanna River Corridor Association.

== Biology ==
The drainage basin of Coal Brook is designated as a Coldwater Fishery and a Migratory Fishery. As of the early 1990s, no macroinvertebrates inhabit the stream.

At the headwaters of Coal Brook, the stream has a substantial riparian buffer consisting of native trees and understory. However, some logging has occurred in its vicinity. Further downstream, successional and invasive vegetation occurs along the stream channel.

== See also ==
- Racket Brook, next tributary of the Lackawanna River going downriver
- Wilson Creek (Lackawanna River), next tributary of the Lackawanna River going upriver
- List of rivers of Pennsylvania
- List of tributaries of the Lackawanna River
