= Pennsylvania Route 106 =

State highway in Pennsylvania, US

Pennsylvania Route 106

Route information
- Maintained by PennDOT
- Length: 20.685 mi (33.289 km)
- Existed: March 14, 1972–present

Major junctions
- West end: US 11 in Kingsley
- I-81 / PA 92 in Lenox; PA 374 from Royal to Clifford Township
- East end: US 6 Bus. in Carbondale

Location
- Country: United States
- State: Pennsylvania
- Counties: Susquehanna, Lackawanna

Highway system
- Pennsylvania State Route System; Interstate; US; State; Scenic; Legislative
← PA 105	→ PA 107

Pennsylvania Route 106 (PA 106) is a 20.69-mile-long (33.30 km) state highway located in both Susquehanna and Lackawanna counties in Pennsylvania. Route 106 begins at a fork from U.S. Route 11 (US 11) in the community of Kingsley. The route heads southeasterly for most of its length, interchanging with Interstate 81 (I-81) in Lenox Township. PA 106 continues into the city of Carbondale, where the designation terminates at US 6 Business (US 6 Bus., North Main Street), the former alignment of US 6 through Carbondale.

PA 106 is one of five portions of the original U.S. Route 106 (US 106), a spur of US 6 through Pennsylvania. US 106 went from US 6 in Wyalusing to the New York state line in Damascus Township along current-day PA 652. The designation was eliminated in 1972 and replaced by PA 106 from Kingsley to Carbondale, PA 652 from Indian Orchard to Darbytown and PA 706 from Wyalusing to New Milford.

== Route description ==
=== Susquehanna County ===
PA 106 begins at an intersection with US 11 in the community of Kingsley. The route heads to the southeast, paralleling US 11 through forestry until the intersection with Jeffers Road, where it turns away from US 11 and enters fields. The route makes several curves to the southeast and east, crossing through several large fields and industries. The route keeps turning to the southeast, re-entering the deep woods and passing a large pond near West Lenox. In West Lenox, PA 106 passes through forestry and residences until leaving the community for more forestry. After paralleling Creek Road for a distance, PA 106 enters the small community of Lenox, where the highway intersects PA 92 near some industry. A short distance later, the highway comes to a partial interchange with I-81 at Interchange 211, with access to southbound I-81 and access from northbound I-81; PA 92 provides the missing movements. After I-81, PA 106 continues paralleling the interstate through forestry. The highway continues eastward, paralleling Stone Road into East Lenox.

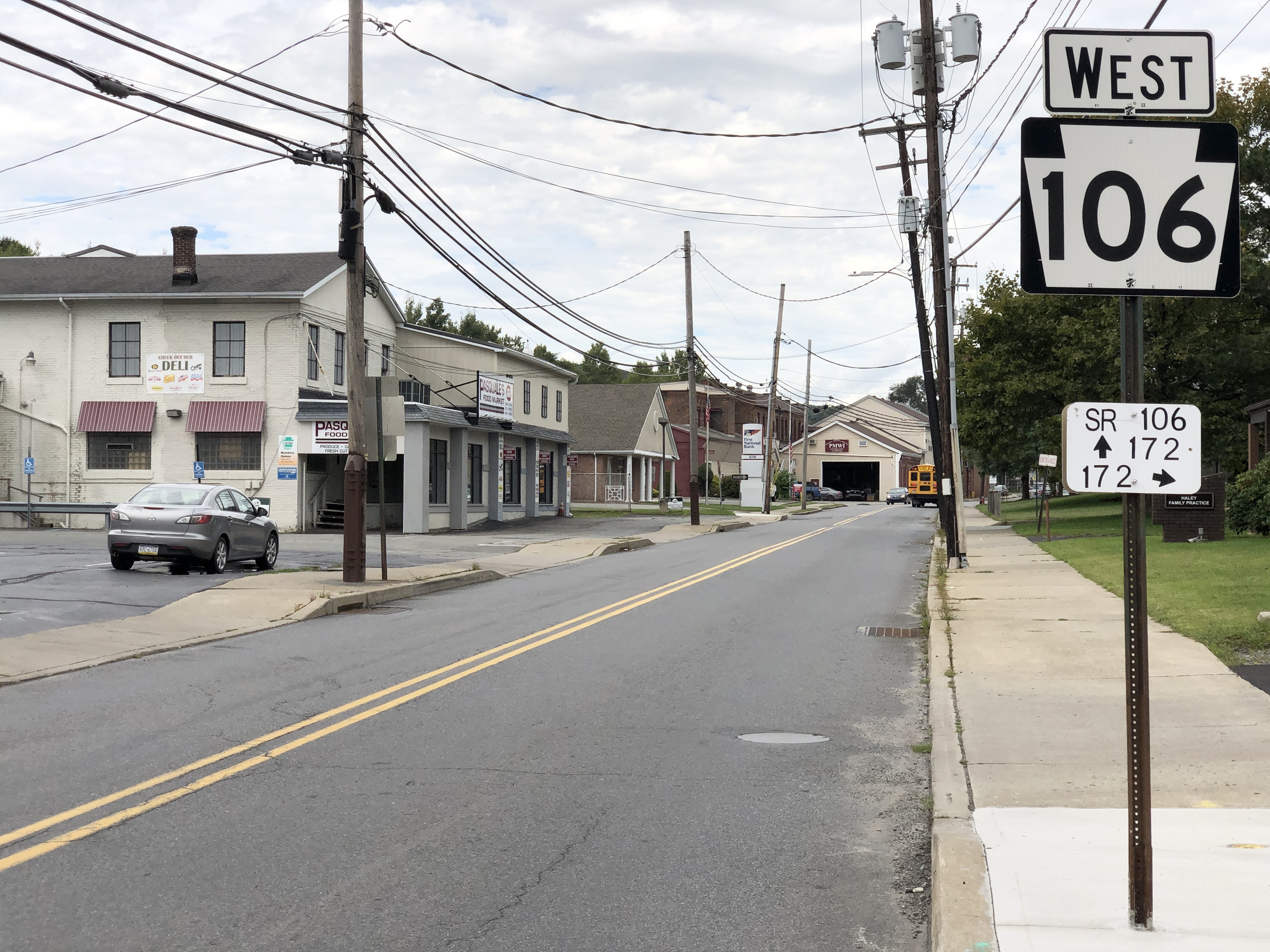
PA 106 westbound in Carbondale

After crossing from East Lenox, PA 106 continues southeastward through fields and soon into a region of residences. The southeastern stretch continues for several miles into the community of West Clifford. There, PA 106 passes some homes and intersects with PA 374. The two designations become concurrent, paralleling the alignment of the Milford and Owego Turnpike Road through West Clifford. PA 106 and PA 374 head southward and soon turn southwestward through forestry, until clearing into the community of Royal. In the small community, PA 106 and PA 374 fork, with PA 374 heading southwestward to Glenwood and PA 106 heading southeastward through Royal. PA 106 continues further, entering deep woods once again after leaving Royal. At the intersection with Cemetery Road, the highway enters a large cemetery and into Clifford. There, the route crosses through a large residential and commercial community, intersecting with State Route 2008 (SR 2008). The route continues southeastward through the residential area before crossing the county line into Lackawanna County.

=== Lackawanna County ===
After crossing into Lackawanna County, PA 106 continues on a southeastern trend, crossing through homes before returning to the deep forestry in Greenfield Township. The route continues further, passing through a lumber yard, where it turns southward and further southeastward into the community of Finch Hill. In Finch Hill, PA 106 passes Our Mother of Sorrows Cemetery and intersects with PA 247 (Lakeland Drive) in the center of the town. After PA 247, PA 106 passes through a small residential district before reaching the Homestead Golf Course. The route passes along the southern side of the golf course and turns eastward after passing to the north of Merli-Sarnoski Park.

After leaving the golf course behind, PA 106 makes a gradual turn to the southeast at Crystal Lake Road. There, the highway becomes known as Fall Brook Road, and turns southward through forestry. At the intersection with 43rd Street, PA 106 enters the city of Carbondale. The route, known now as Fallbrook Street, continues on a southeastern trend, entering a large residential district north of the business district. At the intersection with Dundaff Street, it turns southward again, paralleling a nearby river. At the intersection with River Street, PA 106 turns eastward along Salem Avenue, crosses the river and intersects with US 6 Bus. (North Main Street) in Carbondale. At that intersection, the PA 106 designation terminates while Salem Avenue continues as SR 1019 through Carbondale.

== History ==
U.S. Route 106
- Location: Wyalusing–Narrowsburg
- Existed: 1926–1972

Route of US 106 from 1928 to 1972 in red

PA 106 was originally an alignment of PA 47 designated in 1927. This alignment stretched from US 11 in Kingsley to the intersection with US 6 in Carbondale. In the plan for the U.S. Highway System from November 11, 1926, the road between Wyalusing and Carbondale was to be a part of US 6 while US 106 was to run from US 6 in Wyalusing to the New York border at the Delaware River in Narrowsburg via Scranton. By 1928, US 6 and US 106 switched alignments between Wyalusing and Carbondale. The piece of US 106 that is now PA 106 began in the community of Kingsley and went to the city of Carbondale. The route remained intact for almost 45 years. On December 3, 1971, the American Association of State Highway Officials approved the elimination of the US 106 designation. On March 14, 1972, US 106 was decommissioned and replaced with PA 706 between US 6 in Wyalusing and US 11 south of New Milford, PA 106 between US 11 in Kingsley and US 6 in Carbondale, and PA 652 between US 6 in Indian Orchard and the Delaware River. The remainder of the route was removed from concurrencies with US 11 between south of New Milford and Kingsley and US 6 between Carbondale and Indian Orchard. Signs were changed by April of that year.

== Major intersections ==
County	Location	mi	km	Destinations	Notes
Susquehanna	Kingsley	0.000	0.000	US 11	Western terminus
Susquehanna	Lenox Township	5.670	9.125	I-81 north / PA 92 – South Gibson, Nicholson	
Susquehanna	Lenox Township	5.866– 5.890	9.440– 9.479	I-81 south – Scranton	Exit 211 (I-81)
Susquehanna	Clifford Township	9.490	15.273	PA 374 east (Brooklyn Street) – South Gibson	Western terminus of concurrency with PA 374
Susquehanna	Clifford Township	10.784	17.355	PA 374 west to I-81	Eastern terminus of concurrency with PA 374
Lackawanna	Greenfield Township	15.882	25.560	PA 247 (Lakeland Drive)	
Lackawanna	Carbondale	20.685	33.289	US 6 Bus. (Main Street)	Eastern terminus
1.000 mi = 1.609 km; 1.000 km = 0.621 mi: Concurrency terminus; Incomplete access

== See also ==
- Pennsylvania Route 706
- Pennsylvania Route 652
- U.S. Route 6 in Pennsylvania
