= Simpson, Pennsylvania =

Unincorporated community in Pennsylvania, US

- Census-designated place
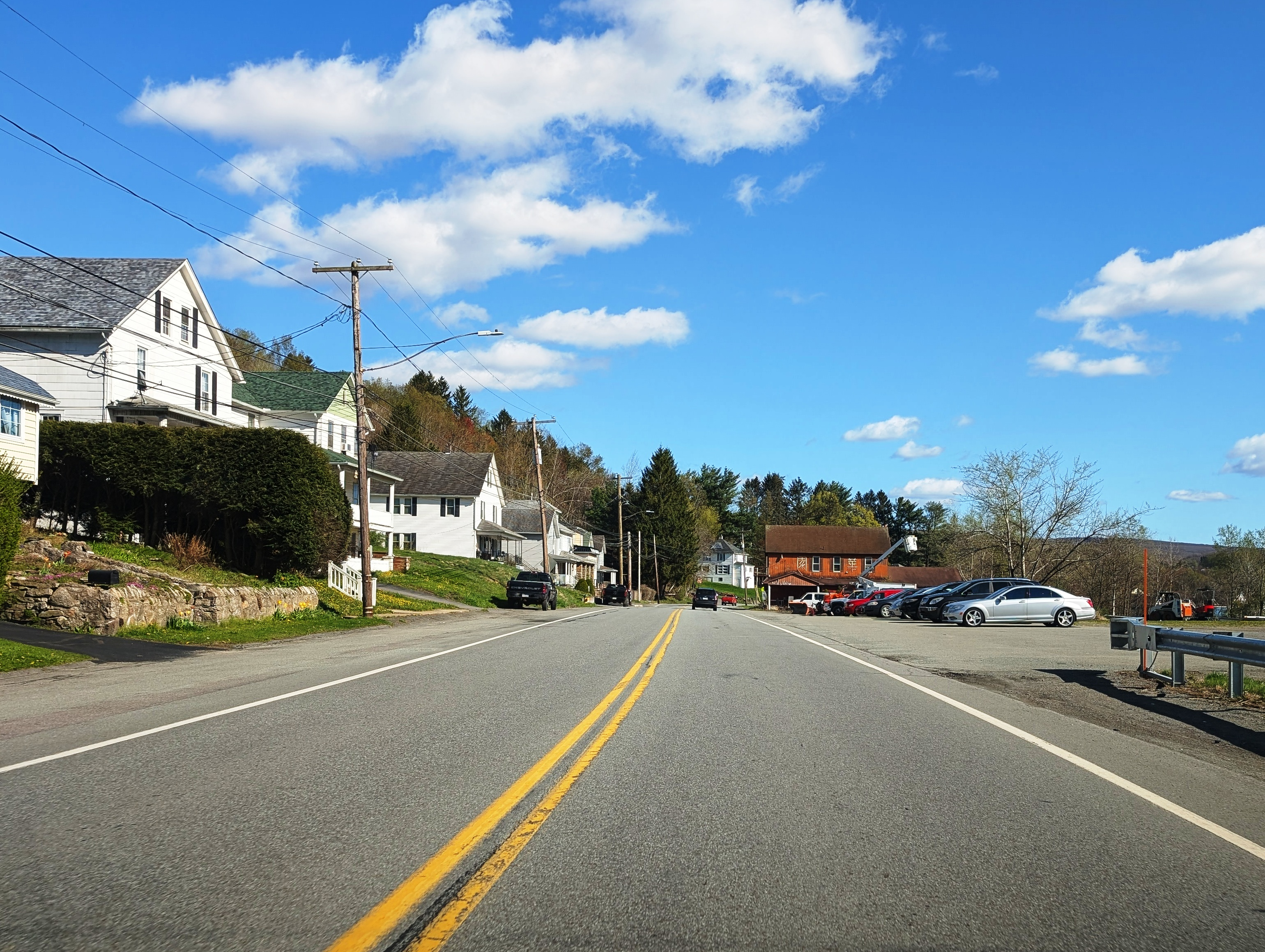
- PA 171 southbound in Simpson

- Location within Pennsylvania Location within the United States
- Coordinates: 41°35′40″N 75°28′53″W
- Country: United States
- State: Pennsylvania
- County: Lackawanna

Area
  - Total: 0.89 sq mi (2.30 km^{2})
  - Land: 0.88 sq mi (2.29 km^{2})
  - Water: 0.0039 sq mi (0.01 km^{2})
- Elevation: 1,197 ft (365 m)

Population (2010)
  - Total: 1,275
  - Density: 1,444/sq mi (557.5/km^{2})
- Time zone: UTC-5 (Eastern (EST))
  - Summer (DST): UTC-4 (EDT)
- ZIP code: 18407
- FIPS code: 42-70840
- GNIS feature ID: 2630039

Simpson is an unincorporated community and census-designated place in Fell Township, Lackawanna County, Pennsylvania, United States. It is directly north of the city of Carbondale on Pennsylvania Route 171. As of the 2010 census the population of Simpson was 1,275.

Simpson was settled in 1818 and organized in 1845. It is named after Clarence D. Simpson, who was one of the large independent coal magnates in the Northern Anthracite Region. Early industries included trapping, tanning and lumbering. Later, coal mining and railroading became dominant professions. The coal miners were often immigrants from Russia, Poland, and Slovakia. Local businesses of the past include Fell Brewing Co., makers of Pennsylvania Pioneer Beer, Mirtz Premium Ale and Fell Porter. The Klotz Throwing Company and Empire Silk Mill merged to become General Textile Mills or Gentex, another important local business. To these jobs and new quarters, working men brought their families. Many churches and schools were built by these new, proud, industrious Americans. The crowning sports achievement came in 1946 when the Fell High School basketball team won the state championship. The final class graduated from Fell High School in 1975 when a merger formed the Carbondale Area District.

== Geography ==
Simpson is in northeastern Lackawanna County, in the southern part of Fell Township. It is bordered to the south by the city of Carbondale. Pennsylvania Route 171 is Simpson's Main Street, leading north 5 miles (8 km) to Forest City and south 1.5 miles (2.4 km) to the center of Carbondale. Simpson is 17 miles (27 km) northeast of Scranton.

According to the U.S. Census Bureau, the Simpson CDP has a total area of 0.89 square miles (2.3 km^{2}), of which 0.006 square miles (0.015 km^{2}), or 0.64%, are water. The Lackawanna River passes through the center of Simpson, flowing southwest to the Susquehanna River at Pittston.
