= Forest City Regional School District =

School district in Pennsylvania

Location
- Lackawanna, Susquehanna, and Wayne Counties US-PA United States
- Coordinates: 41°38′39.6708″N 75°28′22.8642″W

District information
- Type: Public
- Motto: To prepare students to be lifelong learners, critical problem-solvers, and responsible, productive citizens.
- Established: 1961
- Schools: 1 Elementary; 1 High
- NCES District ID: 4209930

Students and staff
- Athletic conference: PIAA; District 2
- District mascot: Forester
- Colors: Purple and gold

Other information
- Website: www.fcrsd.org

Forest City Regional School District is a Pennsylvania third-class school district in Lackawanna, Susquehanna, and Wayne Counties. The district's population was 5,095 at the time of the 2010 United States Census.

Forest City Regional School District covers an area of 87.82 square miles (227.5 km^{2}). The district is one of the 500 public school districts of Pennsylvania. The district's population has remained relatively constant in recent years, being recorded as 5,095 for both the 2000 and 2010 US Censuses. The educational attainment levels for the Forest City Regional School District population (25 years old and over) were 88.10% high school graduates and 16% college graduates. In 2009, the Forest City Regional School District residents’ per capita income was $17,385, while the median family income was $42,652. In the Commonwealth, the median family income was $49,501 and the United States median family income was $49,445, in 2010. By 2013, the median household income in the United States rose to $52,100.

The Forest City Regional School District started with three buildings, two elementary schools (William Penn Elementary, Lincoln Elementary) and Forest City High School. An addition to the high school was done in 1967. In 1971, the three schools were combined into one. In 1995, the building was again expanded. A new gymnasium, an auditorium, a computer lab, a chemistry lab, and more classrooms were added. Extensive remodeling was also done at this time to the existing structure. The high school serves as the starting point for the Steamtown Marathon.

Forest City Regional School District operates two schools: an elementary school and a high school. High school students may choose to attend The Career Technology Center of Lackawanna County for training in the construction and mechanical trades. The Northeastern Educational Intermediate Unit IU19 provides the district with a wide variety of services like specialized education for disabled students (including hearing, speech and visual disability services) and professional development for staff and faculty.

== Regions and constituent municipalities ==
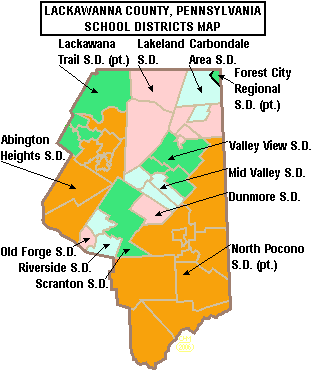
Map of school districts in Lackawanna County

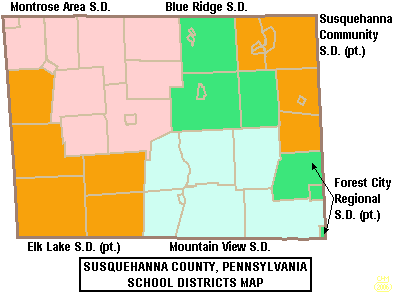
Map of school districts in Susquehanna County

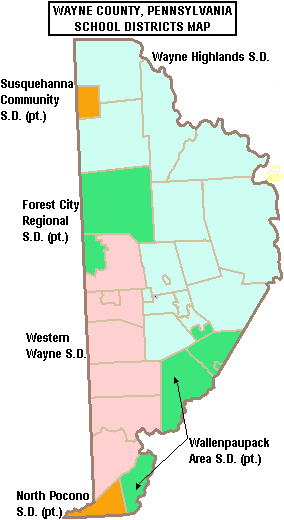
Map of school districts in Wayne County

The district is divided into nine regions (alternate region names in parentheses), which are contiguous with or contained within the following municipalities (with county labels in parentheses):

- Clinton Township (Wayne) (partially in the Western Wayne School District) – Region I (Clinton II)
- Herrick Township (Susquehanna) – Region II (Herrick Township)
- Union Dale Borough (Susquehanna) – Region III (Uniondale)
- Vandling Borough (Lackawanna) – Region IV (Vandling)
- Mount Pleasant Township (Wayne) – Regions V (Pleasant Mount II/III) and VI (Pleasant Mount I)
- Forest City Borough (Susquehanna) – Regions VII (Forest City 1W1D), VIII (Forest City 2W2D), and IX (Forest City 1W2D)

== Extracurriculars ==
The Forest City Regional School District offers a variety of clubs, activities, and an extensive sports program.

Varsity

Boys

- Baseball – A
- Basketball- A
- Cross country running – A
- Golf – AA
- Soccer – A
- Volleyball – AA

Girls

- Basketball – A
- Cross Country – A
- Golf – AA
- Soccer (Fall) – A
- Softball – A
- Volleyball – AA

Junior High School Sports

Boys

- Baseball
- Basketball
- Cross Country
- Golf
- Soccer
- Volleyball

Girls

- Basketball
- Cross Country
- Soccer (Fall)
- Softball
- Volleyball

According to PIAA directory July 2013
