= Vandling, Pennsylvania =

Borough in Pennsylvania, US

- Borough
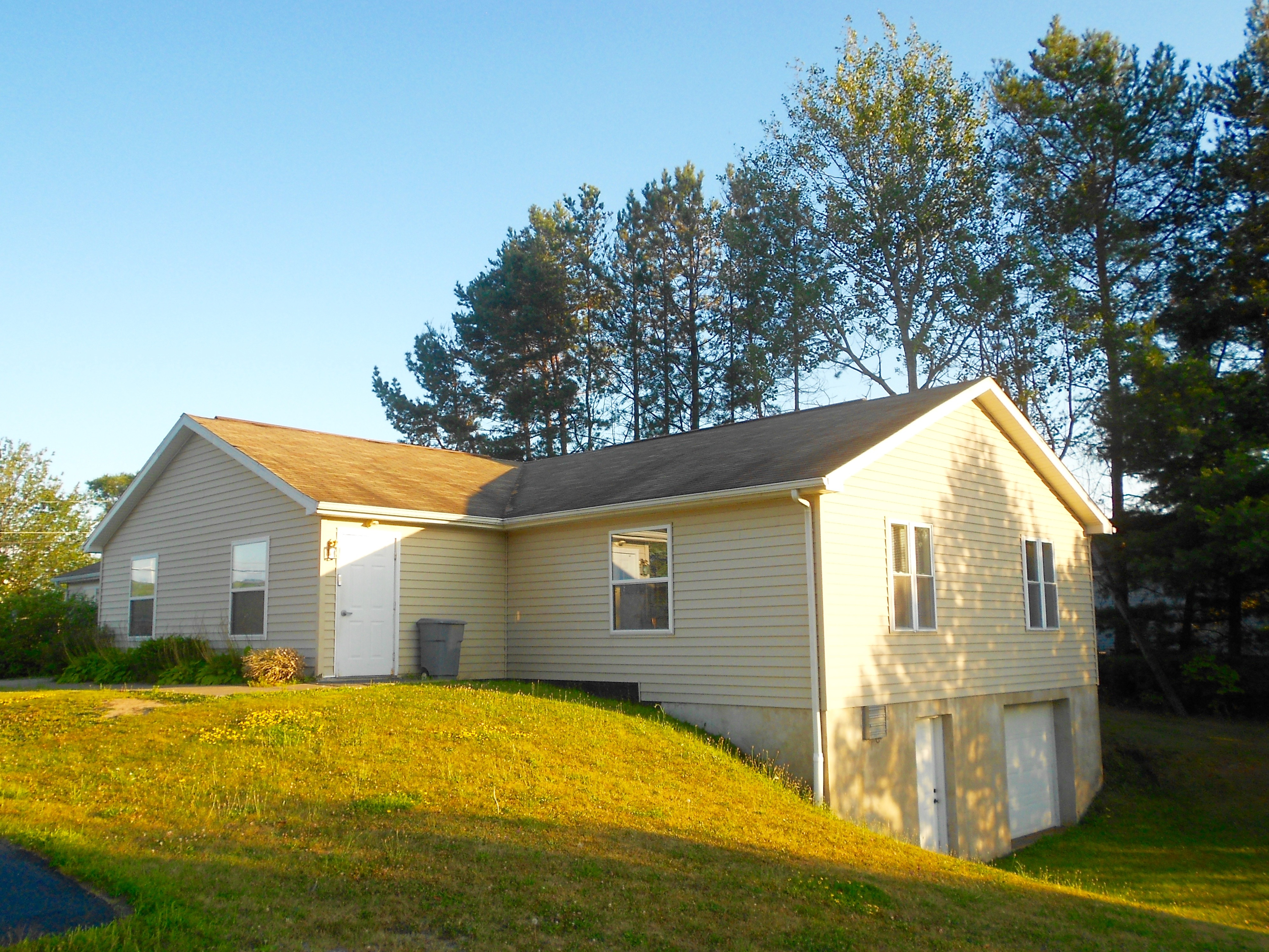
- Vandling Municipal Complex

- Location in Lackawanna County, Pennsylvania

- Location in Pennsylvania Location in the United States
- Coordinates: 41°38′02″N 75°28′10″W
- Country: United States
- State: Pennsylvania
- County: Lackawanna

Area
  - Total: 1.31 sq mi (3.40 km^{2})
  - Land: 1.31 sq mi (3.40 km^{2})
  - Water: 0 sq mi (0.00 km^{2})
- Elevation: 1,365 ft (416 m)

Population (2020)
  - Total: 730 ▼
  - Estimate (2021): 728
  - Density: 537.0/sq mi (207.34/km^{2})
- Time zone: UTC-5 (EST)
  - Summer (DST): UTC-4 (EDT)
- Zip Code: 18421
- Area code: 570
- FIPS code: 42-79792
- Website: vandlingpa.us

Vandling is a borough in the northeastern corner of Lackawanna County, Pennsylvania, United States. The population was 730 at the 2020 census. It is located immediately south of Forest City (population 1,911), which is in Susquehanna County.

== Geography ==
Vandling is located at 41°38′2″N 75°28′10″W (41.633771, -75.469578).

According to the United States Census Bureau, the borough has a total area of 3.4 square kilometers (1.3 sq mi) , all land.

== Demographics ==
Historical population
Census	Pop.	Note	%±
1900	765		—
1910	985		28.8%
1920	1,258		27.7%
1930	1,169		−7.1%
1940	970		−17.0%
1950	722		−25.6%
1960	578		−19.9%
1970	633		9.5%
1980	557		−12.0%
1990	660		18.5%
2000	738		11.8%
2010	751		1.8%
2020	730		−2.8%
2021 (est.)	728	▼	−0.3%

As of the 2010 Census, there were 751 people, 309 households, and 203 families residing in the borough. The population density was 577.7 inhabitants per square mile (223.1/km^{2}). There were 340 housing units at an average density of 102.1 per square kilometer; (261.5 per square mile;). The racial makeup of the borough was 96% White, 1.3% Black, 0.7% American Indian, 0.3% Asian, 0.5% from some other race, and 1.2% from two or more races. Hispanic or Latino of any race were 2.1% of the population.

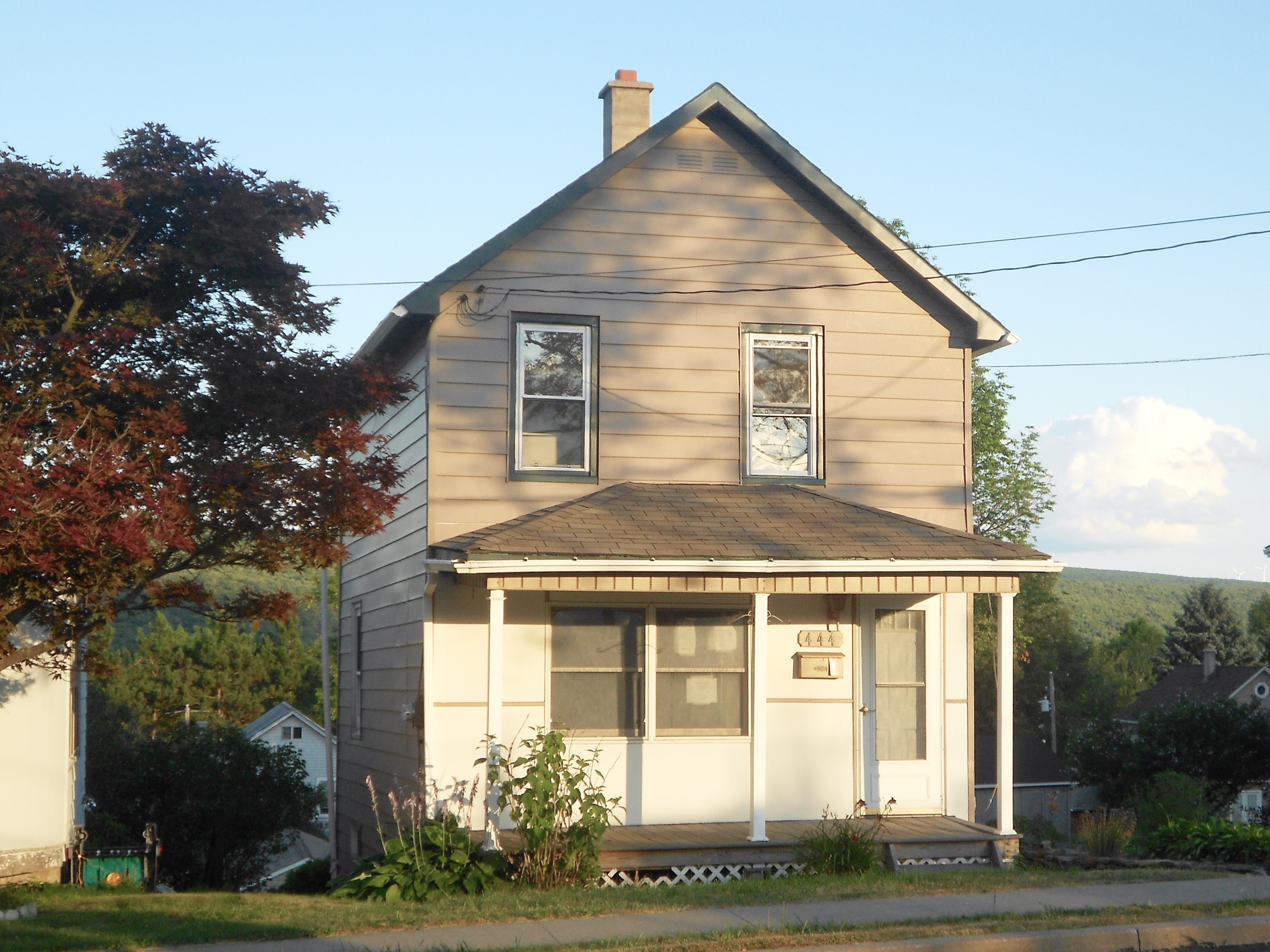
444 Main Street

There were 309 households, out of which 27.5% had children under the age of 18 living with them, 51.8% were married couples living together, 10.7% had a female householder with no husband present, and 34.3% were non-families. 27.2% of all households were made up of individuals, and 13.6% had someone living alone who was 65 years of age or older. The average household size was 2.43 and the average family size was 2.95.

In the borough the population was spread out, with 22.2% under the age of 18, 60.4% from 18 to 64, and 17.4% who were 65 years of age or older. The median age was 42.5 years.

The median income for a household in the borough was $37,212, and the median income for a family was $46,250. Males had a median income of $32,250 versus $24,444 for females. The per capita income for the borough was $18,748. About 3.4% of families and 5.6% of the population were below the poverty line, including 6.3% of those under age 18 and 6.5% of those age 65 or over.

== Education ==
Forest City Regional School District is a Preschool-12th grade public school district serving residents of Vandling Borough.
