= Anthony J. Burshnick =

United States Air Force general

- Born: January 12, 1937 (age 89); Forest City, Pennsylvania, U.S.
- Military career
- Allegiance: United States of America
- Branch: United States Air Force
- Service years: 1954–1991
- Rank: Lieutenant general

Anthony J. Burshnick (born January 12, 1937) is a retired lieutenant general in the United States Air Force. He was vice commander in chief, Military Airlift Command, with headquarters at Scott Air Force Base.

Burshnick was born in Forest City, Pennsylvania, in 1937, where he graduated from high school in 1954. He earned a Bachelor of Science degree from the U.S. Air Force Academy in 1960 and a Master of Science degree in public administration from Auburn University in 1976. He completed Squadron Officer School in 1964, Armed Forces Staff College in 1971 and Air War College as a distinguished graduate in 1976. He also completed the executive development program at Cornell University in 1980 and Harvard University's International Security Forum in 1986.

He enlisted in the Air Force in 1954 and served as an electronics instructor at Chanute Air Force Base, Illinois, until entering the academy in 1956. Upon graduating in June 1960, he was commissioned as a second lieutenant and then completed pilot training at Spence Air Base, Georgia., and Vance Air Force Base, Oklahoma. After receiving his pilot wings in September 1961, he was assigned to the 40th Military Air Transport Squadron at McGuire Air Force Base, N.J., as a C-135 pilot. In January 1965 he transferred to the 19th Air Commando Squadron in the Republic of Vietnam as a C-123 pilot.

Upon his return to the United States in January 1966, he served as a C-135 instructor pilot with the 40th Military Airlift Squadron at McGuire. In January 1967 he returned to the Air Force Academy as an air officer commanding and chief of the Cadet Scheduling Division. He attended the Armed Forces Staff College from January 1971 to July 1971. He then was assigned as war plans officer at MAC headquarters. This was followed by an assignment in January 1973 to Washington, D.C., as an Air Force liaison officer to the U.S. House of Representatives. In June 1975 he was selected to attend the Air War College.

Burshnick served as assistant deputy commander and, then, deputy commander for operations, 443rd Military Airlift Wing, at Altus Air Force Base, Okla., from July 1976 to April 1978. He next was assigned as vice commander of the 63rd Military Airlift Wing at Norton Air Force Base, Calif. In May 1979 he took command of the 475th Air Base Wing, Yokota Air Base, Japan.

Returning to the United States in July 1980, he was assigned to Travis Air Force Base, California, where he served initially as commander of the 60th Military Airlift Wing. In March 1982 he became vice commander of 22nd Air Force. In June 1982 he returned to the Air Force Academy as commandant of cadets and in July 1984 he was assigned as deputy chief of staff for plans at MAC headquarters. In October 1986 he was assigned as director of personnel programs, Office of the Deputy Chief of Staff, Personnel, Headquarters U.S. Air Force, Washington, D.C. He became assistant deputy chief of staff for plans and operations at Air Force headquarters in June 1987. He assumed his present duties in September 1988.

He is a command pilot with more than 5,000 flying hours in aircraft including T-29s, T-39s, C-47s, C-118s, C-123s, C-131s, C-135s, C-141s and C-5s. His military decorations and awards include the Distinguished Service Medal, Legion of Merit, Distinguished Flying Cross, Meritorious Service Medal with three oak leaf clusters, Air Medal with 16 oak leaf clusters, Air Force Commendation Medal with oak leaf cluster, Air Force Outstanding Unit Award with "V" device and four oak leaf clusters, Combat Readiness Medal, Good Conduct Medal, National Defense Service Medal with service star, Armed Forces Expeditionary Medal with three service stars, Vietnam Service Medal with three service stars, Air Force Longevity Service Award Ribbon with seven oak leaf clusters, and Republic of Vietnam Campaign Medal.

He was promoted to lieutenant general October 1, 1988, with same date of rank and retired on March 1, 1991.
