= Steamtown Marathon =

Coordinates: 41.40829°N 75.66336°W

- (2009 photo)
- Date: mid-October
- Location: Scranton, Pennsylvania, United States
- Event type: Road
- Distance: Marathon
- Established: 1996
- Website: Steamtown Marathon

The Steamtown Marathon is an annual marathon (26.2 mi or 42.2 km) in northeastern Pennsylvania, held the Sunday before Columbus Day. The race starts at Forest City High School in Forest City and finishes at Courthouse Square in downtown Scranton. The race has a limit of 3000 runners, and usually sells out.

== History ==
The marathon was founded in 1996 by Scranton Organized Area Runners in conjunction with the Scranton Cultural Center and the Lackawanna County Convention and Visitors Bureau.

The 2020 edition of the race was cancelled due to the coronavirus pandemic, with all registrants automatically receiving full refunds.

== Course ==
The point-to-point course starts at Forest City High School in Forest City and passes through 13 communities before finishing at Courthouse Square in downtown Scranton.

The course is certified by USA Track and Field and has been ranked as one of the fastest qualifying courses for the Boston Marathon. On average, between 22% and 25% of all Steamtown finishers qualify for the Boston Marathon. In 2009, only five other marathons had a higher percentage of Boston qualifiers than Steamtown. Also in 2009, a Runners World survey ranked Steamtown as the 6th best overall marathon. However, in recent years the percentage of finishers who qualify has decreased to less than 10%; in 2018, 8.4% of the 1,251 runners had qualifying times.

== Community impact ==
The race benefits St. Joseph's Center, a facility that assists families in need and handicapped children. Since 1996, the Marathon has donated more than $1.3 million to St. Joseph's Center.
