= Herrick Township, Susquehanna County, Pennsylvania =

Township in Pennsylvania, United States

Coordinates: 41°44′00″N 75°28′59″W

- Township
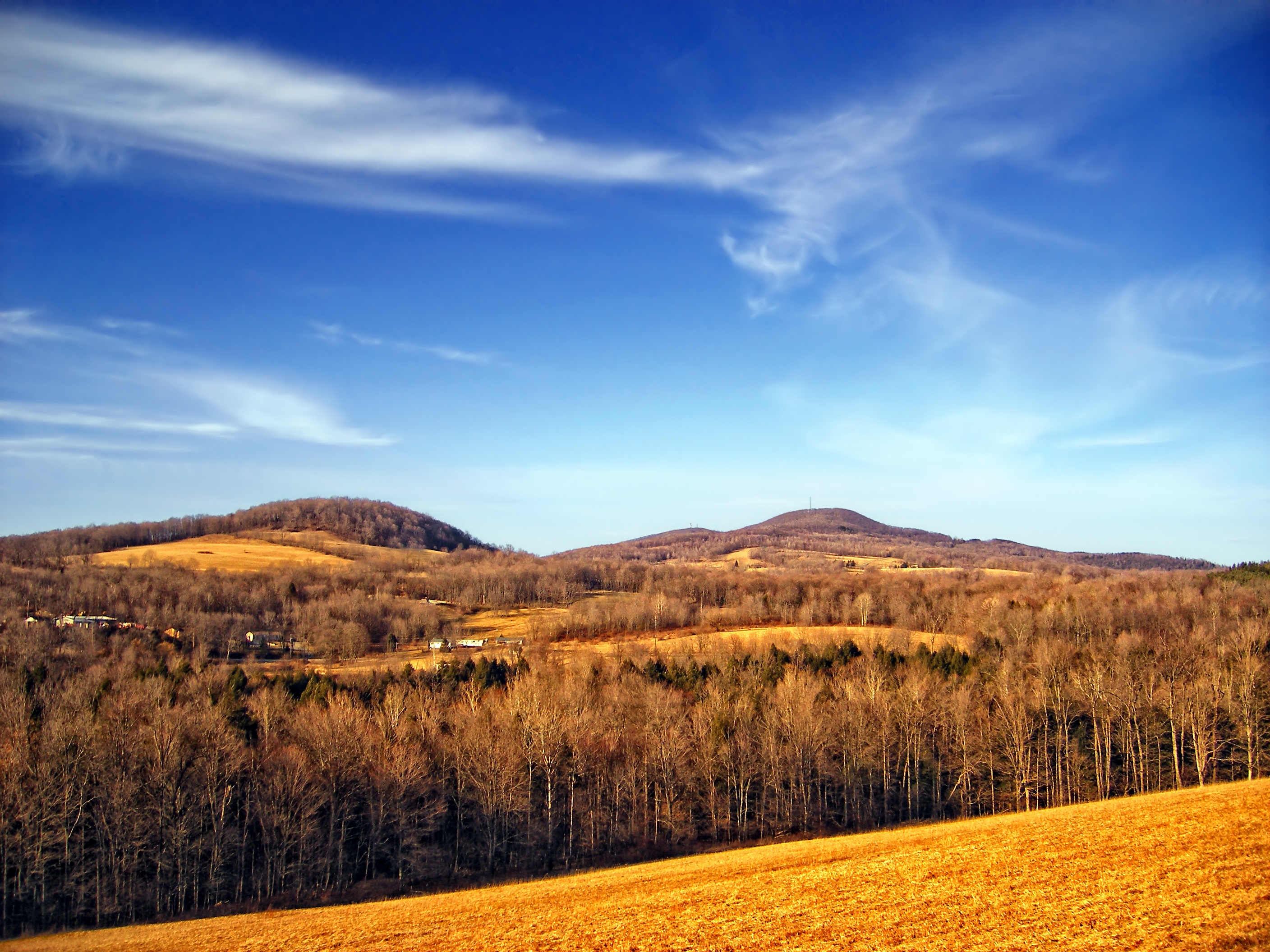
- Elk Hill

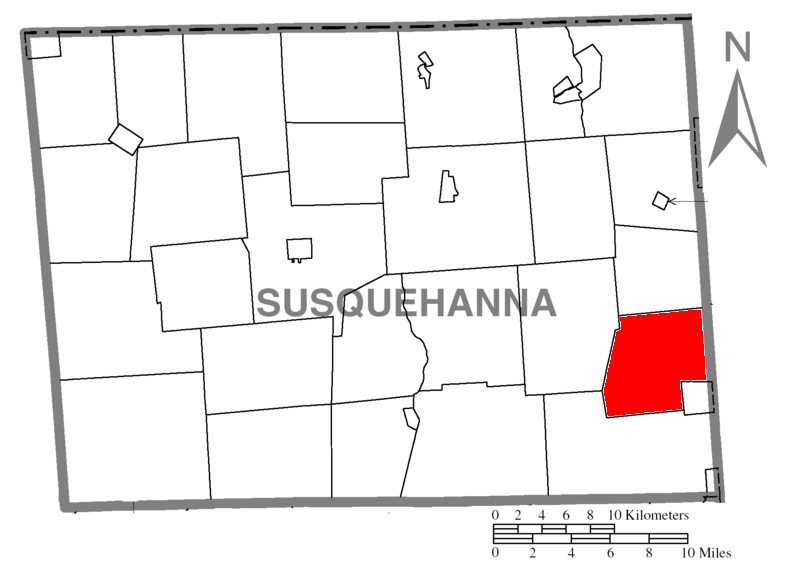
- Map of Susquehanna County, Pennsylvania highlighting Herrick Township

- Map of Susquehanna County, Pennsylvania
- Country: United States
- State: Pennsylvania
- County: Susquehanna
- Settled: 1789
- Incorporated: 1825

Area
  - Total: 24.86 sq mi (64.40 km^{2})
  - Land: 24.65 sq mi (63.84 km^{2})
  - Water: 0.22 sq mi (0.56 km^{2})

Population (2020)
  - Total: 711 ▼
  - Estimate (2021): 714
  - Density: 27.9/sq mi (10.78/km^{2})
- Time zone: UTC-5 (Eastern (EST))
  - Summer (DST): UTC-4 (EDT)
- Area code: 570
- FIPS code: 42-115-34096
- Website: https://www.herricktwp.org/

Herrick Township is a township in Susquehanna County, Pennsylvania. The population was 711 at the 2020 census.

== History ==
Herrick Township was formed from parts of Gibson and Clifford Townships on April 20, 1825.

== Communities ==
The following villages are located in Herrick Township:

- Dimock Corners
- Herrick Center (also called Herrick)
- Tirzah

== Geography ==
According to the U.S. Census Bureau, the township has a total area of 24.85 square miles (64.4 km^{2}), of which 24.65 square miles (63.8 km^{2}) is land and 0.2 square miles (0.52 km^{2}) (1.24%) is water.

== Demographics ==
Historical population
Census	Pop.	Note	%±
2010	713		—
2020	711		−0.3%
2021 (est.)	714		0.4%
U.S. Decennial Census

=== 2010 census ===
At the 2010 census there were 713 people, 308 households, and 217 families living in the township. The population density was 28.9 people per square mile (11.2 people/km^{2}). There were 749 housing units at an average density of 30.4 per square mile (11.7/km^{2}). The racial makeup of the township was 97.3% White, 0.6% African American, 0.3% Native American, 0.3% Asian, 0.7% from some other race, and 0.8% from two or more races. Hispanic or Latino of any race were 1.4%.

Of the 308 households 25% had children under the age of 18 living with them, 58.4% were married couples living together, 5.8% had a female householder with no husband present, and 29.5% were non-families. 25% of households were one person and 8.7% were one person aged 65 or older. The average household size was 2.31 and the average family size was 2.71.

The age distribution was 18% under the age of 18, 61.7% from 18 to 64, and 20.3% 65 or older. The median age was 49 years. The median household income was $58,125 and the median family income was $60,069. Males had a median income of $53,500 versus $37,250 for females. The per capita income for the township was $32,337. About 3% of families and 4.5% of the population were below the poverty line, including 21.1% of those under age 18 and none of those age 65 or over.

== Education ==
Forest City Regional School District is a Preschool-12th grade public school district serving residents of Herrick Township.
