= Kingsley, Pennsylvania =

Unincorporated community in Pennsylvania, US

Coordinates: 41°45′35″N 75°45′08″W

Kingsley is in Harford Township, Susquehanna County, Pennsylvania, United States. Kingsley was named after Revolutionary War veteran Rufus Kingsley, who had been the first settler in the area. Kingsley is located in the Endless Mountains of Northeastern Pennsylvania. The population in 1900 was 75, and the current population is about 50. The town itself is very small but the outskirts extend up to ten miles outside the actual town. The population in the outskirts of the town is over two hundred. Kingsley is located about a half-hour from the cities of Binghamton, New York, and Scranton, Pennsylvania.

Kingsley is served by area codes 570 and 272.

== Prince Perkins ==
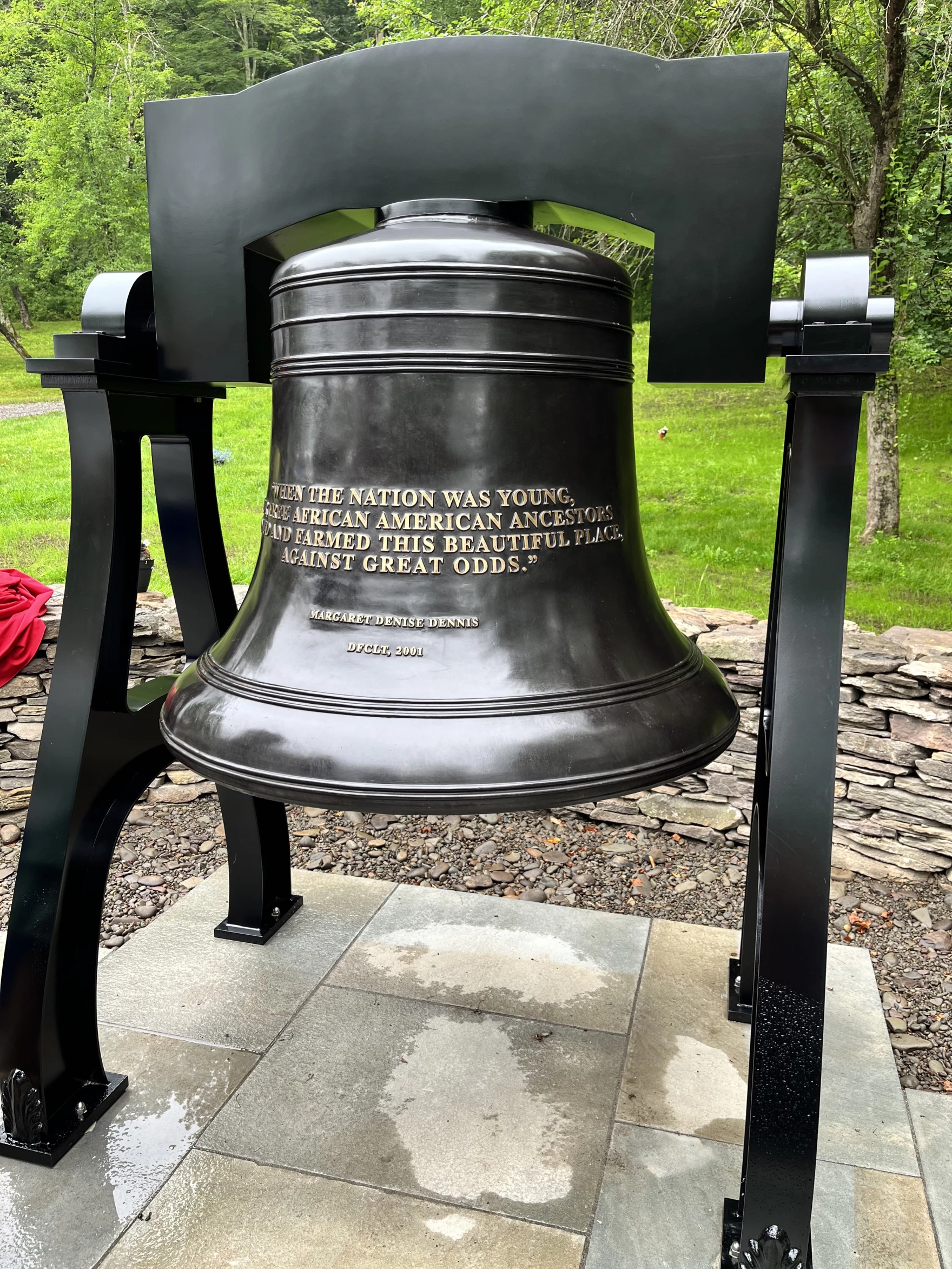
Semisesquicentennial Bell on the Dennis Family Farm

Technically, Rufus Kingsley was not the first person to settle in the area. In 1793, a free African American, Prince Perkins (1750–1839), his wife Judith, son William, and daughter Phebe moved to a place just outside the current town of Kingsley, from Connecticut. There is no record as to whether or not he was ever a slave, but if he had been, he was free according to the laws of Connecticut, which abolished slavery in 1780. Perkins enlisted and fought in the Revolutionary War. His daughter, Phebe Perkins, married Revolutionary War veteran, Bristol Budd Sampson, a comrade and close friend of Perkins' who served with him in the 4th Connecticut of the Continental Army and endured the long winter at Valley Forge. Prince Perkins' son William Perkins inherited his property and upon William's death, it passed to William's widow, Melinda Perkins who upon her death, bequeathed it to their daughter, Angeline Perkins Dennis (1832–1873). Angeline and her husband Henry W. Dennis (1815–1882) expanded the property in the mid-19th century and it has been known as the Dennis Farm ever since. Both Prince Perkins and Bristol Budd Sampson and members of their families are buried in the Perkins-Dennis Cemetery on the Dennis farm. The farm has remained in the stewardship of the Dennis family to the present day and is listed on the National Register of Historic Places.

Bristol Budd Sampson eventually moved to Kingsley himself. Bristol was an African American who served in the Revolutionary War and is said to have been an attendant to General George Washington. He married Phebe Perkins and they had several children. Sampson lost his sight, after he moved to Kingsley. In 1820, with the help of his neighbors, he applied for a pension based on his service in the Revolutionary War. He was eventually awarded a pension of ninety-six dollars a year. Phebe Perkins Sampson continued to receive his pension after his death. She also received a land grant after which, she and one of their daughters left Pennsylvania. Before they left, they sold the Sampson property to Melinda Perkins, William Perkins' widow.

The land where the Perkins-Dennis family settled is now the Dennis Farm Charitable Land Trust and was created by Denise Dennis and the Dennis family, direct descendants of Prince Perkins. It was established in 2001 for the historical preservation of the farmhouse, stone fences, and cemetery on the Dennis Farm where Bristol Budd Sampson and Prince Perkins are buried. The cemetery contains forty others including members of the Perkins Dennis family and a black Civil War veteran. During the spring and summers of 2008 and 2009, students from the State University of New York (SUNY) at Binghamton uncovered thousands of artifacts during archaeological research on the property, on behalf of the Dennis Farm Charitable Land Trust. The history of the Prince Perkins family is fully documented in the Susquehanna County Historical Society and the Brooklyn, PA Historical Society.

== Rufus Kingsley ==
In 1809, a man named Rufus Kingsley, his wife Lucinda, and their four children John, Nancy, Rufus, and Lucretia moved from Windham, Connecticut, to what was then Harford Township (Benning 1). Rufus was born in Windham, Connecticut, on February 1, 1763. He fought in the Battle of Bunker Hill, just outside Boston, at the age of thirteen as a drummer boy. He was one of three drummer boys in the battle. He married Lucinda Cutler on October 12, 1786. He moved to present day Kingsley in 1809, where he built a fulling (wool) mill and a house. His home still stands today and so does a maple tree that he and his family planted. He died on May 26, 1846, at the age of eighty-three (Kesteloot). His wife died three days later. They are both buried in the Universalist Cemetery in Brooklyn, Pennsylvania because they attend the Universalist church all their lives.

John, Rufus's son, lived in town his whole life. He married Edith Chase. He and Edith had at least one daughter. He built a “mansion” next to his father's home (Benning 1). His house burnt while another family lived in it, long after he died. John and his wife are buried in the Harford Cemetery, Harford, Pennsylvania. John had at least one daughter named Ellen. She married another town resident Manning Perigo. She and Manning had at least two children named Bert and Edith. Nancy and Lucretia, Rufus's daughters, moved out of town. They both, at different points in time, taught at a school in Brooklyn. Not much is known about Rufus's other children.

== Railroad ==
The town took the name Kingsley in 1886 when a railroad station was built. The Delaware, Lackawanna and Western Railroad track was built on present day Route 11 in about 1870 (Benning 2). Trains would stop to fill their water tanks in town. In 1886, a group of townspeople decided that Kingsley should have a town station. It cost $1,310 for the station to be built (Benning 2). The townspeople agreed that the station and the town needed a name, so they named it after Rufus Kingsley.

The railroad was moved in 1915 during the construction of the Summit Cut-off. Cut-off construction started in 1912 and ended in 1915. The Delaware, Lackawanna and Western Railroad decided to reroute the tracks to reduce grades and to shorten the time between Clarks Summit, Pennsylvania, and Hallstead, Pennsylvania. The tracks were relocated to their current spot and a new station was built. Because of the cut-off, the town's economy boomed because all the workers needed food and shelter. Every home took in as many people as possible and every structure, including chicken coops, was filled.

Martins Creek Viaduct One of the biggest undertakings of the cut-off was the building of the Martins Creek Viaduct. The Martins Creek Viaduct is 1,600 feet (490 m) long and has ten 150-foot-high (46 m) arches (Bridges to the Future). Construction began in 1912 and ended in the fall of 1914. It was completed a year ahead of schedule. Soldiers guarded the viaduct during World War I. The soldiers slept in tents in the swampland near the viaduct. The viaduct is still used today. The viaduct spans Route 11 and Martins Creek.

== Post Office ==
The first post office in town was built in 1886. The first postmaster was Will Whitney (Benning 12). He was followed by Clark Tiffany. Clark was followed by Stephen E. Tiffany. The post office was moved and R.J. Alexander took over. George Finn was the next postmaster. Frank Tiffany was the next postmaster he moved the post office. It was moved to a building that is currently a garage. Walter Tiffany was then appointed postmaster and the post office was moved again, to its current spot, in 1933. Linda Hunter is the current postmaster.

== Churches ==
The first church in town was built in 1894. The Universalist Church of Our Father received a charter on January 8, 1894. Construction began soon after and the cornerstone was laid in November 1894. The church was dedicated November 13, 1895. Reverend Ralph Edwin Horn was the first pastor of the church. On November 13, 1920, the church, led by reverend George F. Morton, celebrated the church's twenty-fifth anniversary. The church's fiftieth anniversary was celebrated on November 13, 1945, with Reverend D. Lamphear as pastor. After a while membership decreased and the church closed. The basement of the church continued to be used for various town parties/fundraisers. The church became Kingsley Community Church in the 1970s. Reverend Alex Scott was the first pastor. Membership grew and the church was added on to. The church is still a Community Church. The Methodist Church received its charter September 4, 1897. On June 26, 1897, the original plot of land was bought for seventy-five dollars. The church was built by local carpenter Warner Wilmarth. The cornerstone was laid on October 23, 1897.The church burned in 1923. A new church was built on the same plot in 1924. The church's membership grew and the church was added on to. The church was moved back forty feet so it could be added on to. The Kingsley Methodist Church still exists today.

When attendance declined at both churches, the Kingsley Civic Club arranged a community Sunday School that combined both churches. Sunday School classes were held at the Universalist Church from October to April and classes were held in the Methodist church were held from May to September.

== Schools ==
The first school in town was built in 1896. The first teacher was John Palmer. A second story was added to the school in 1907. In 1929, the Kingsley Civic Club landscaped the grounds. In 1939 the school was closed and all the students were bused to Harford. In 1959, the Harford High School was closed and the Mountain View Junior/Senior High School was opened. In 1991 the Mountain View Elementary School was built and three local schools were combined. The original schoolhouse still stands today on Mill Street, near the Rufus Kingsley house. It is now a private residence.

== Kingsley Civic Club ==
The Kingsley Civic Club was founded in 1928 by the women of the town (Benning 5). The club arranged many gatherings and fundraisers. The club held many ice cream socials and dances in the Klan Hall. They also sponsored roller skating in the Klan Hall. The civic club still exists today.

== Woman's Christian Temperance Union ==
Kingsley also had a Woman's Christian Temperance Union. The union was created to educate people of the harmful effect of alcoholic drinks. The union also held fundraisers. An article in a newspaper on February 12, 1909, said “The ladies of the W. C. T. U. will hold an apron sale in the basement of the Universalist church, Feb. 17th. The date is in honor of the birthday of Miss Frances Willard, who was the founder of the organization of the Woman's Christian Temperance Union. A supper will be served of substantial eatables, including warm biscuits, honey and maple syrup. There will be aprons and other articles for sale, also homemade candy. Supper 10 cents, all welcome.” (100 Years Ago).

== Stearns Mill ==
In 1900, George and Coe Stearns built the Stearns Mill on Parsonage Street. Before the mill was built Coe sold feed out of the red barn (mentioned above) for four years. The mill was built by local carpenter Warner Wilmarth. The mill was built for grinding feed and selling western grain (Richardson 368). In 1918, George sold his interests to his brother and moved to Camp Hill, Pennsylvania to work for the State Department of Education. Coe continued the mill until he handed over the mill to his grandson, Richard Masters. Richard ran the mill for about ten years until he sold it to Ross Brothers (Masters). Ross Brothers owned the mill until in burned on September 7, 1966 (Benning 4). During the interview with Mr. Masters, he said of the fire, “I was there that night. I remember it very plainly. I talked with Mr. Ross and he was sure he would go out of business.” Mr. Masters continued saying he helped Mr. Ross find a mill in Hop Bottom, Pennsylvania (Masters). Ross Brothers continued to sell feed in town at a warehouse near the current railroad tracks until they moved to Hop Bottom. Ross Brothers is now owned by three partners. They still use their mill in Hop Bottom. They have a small mill, located in Kingsley, on Mill Street. If you go to the site of Stearns Mill today, you can find actual pieces of the concrete floor still in the ground. The site is now owned by the Scott family. The site is now the Scotts' front yard.

== Acid factory ==
The Messrs. Porter and Bayless Company of Binghamton, New York built an acid factory in town in 1900(Benning 5). An 85-foot-tall (26 m) smokestack was built. Cheap houses were also built to house the workers. The company also purchased the timber in the vicinity of the factory. If you ever look at a picture of Kingsley in the Acid factory days, you will notice a lot of cut down trees. All the timber the company owned was cut down. The factory produced wood alcohol and acetate. The acetate was exported to Germany. The factory could only use certain woods. So all the wood they could not use was sent down Martins Creek, to a saw mill. The factory was soon sold to Ballard-Rought Chemical Company in February 1903 for $60,000. In April 1905, the factory was sold to M. J. Corbet & Son of Conklin, New York, and the name of the company was changed to Kingsley Chemical Company. In 1912, when all the timber was cut, the factory was packed up, except the smokestack, and moved to Shinhopple, New York. The factory was located on Tannery Street. Remnants from the factory are still found today.

== Hotel Kingsley ==
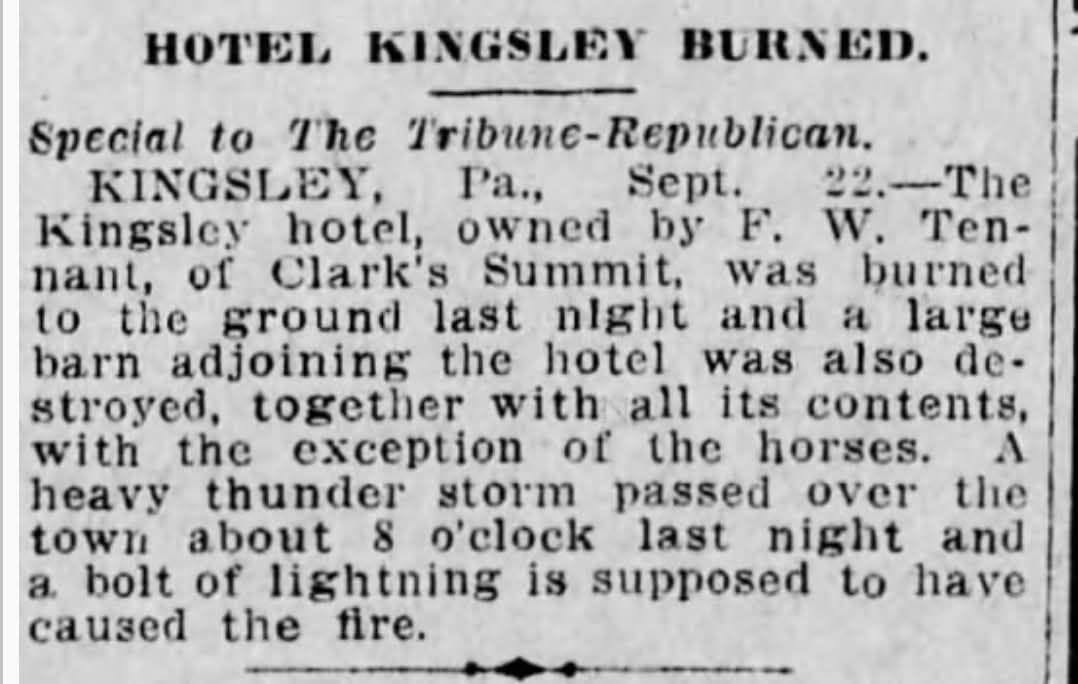

Owned by C. L. Carpenter, the former operator of Tennant House in Hop Bottom, PA and owned by F. W. Tennant of Clarks Summit, PA. (The historic F.W. Tennant property in Hop Bottom, Pennsylvania, also known historically as the Wilmarth Hotel, Exchange Hotel, Valley View House, and Trail Inn, was a prominent 19th-century local landmark. The location is now the site of Hortman's Garage.)

Mr. Carpenter asserted the hotel was a "dry" establishment, "...in full keeping with the law, but even will not have a bottle Soda Pop on the premises..." However; none of that would matter for long - as during the week of September 22nd, 1911, the hotel would be struck by lightning and burn to the ground.

== Aqua Inn ==
In 1910, Coe Stearns decided to build the Aqua Inn. Some townspeople did not like that the Hotel Kingsley served alcohol, so they built the Aqua Inn.

Aqua is Latin for water. This meant the Inn was a temperance, or alcohol-free, inn. The Inn was built by Warner Wilmarth. The business was very successful until it was sold to Mr. and Mr. Grant Tompkins. The Tompkins remolded the Inn so they could cater parties (Benning 9).

The inn was very busy during the reconstruction of Route 11. In 1954, the Inn was sold to Orrin Applemen. He and his wife used the Inn as a boarding home for elderly people. In 1960, the Inn was sold to Wesley Rosengrant. The Inn was made into the Rosengrant Market (Benning 9). The Inn was eventually purchased by Richard Masters’ sister, Maxine. It was then sold to her brother Jack Masters and his wife Carol. In 2016, the former Aqua Inn was converted into a restaurant.

== Town water ==
Kingsley once had town water. Alva J. Masters, Richard Master's father, ran and owned the water company (Masters). A.J. used Hall Pond as a reservoir. Hall Pond is located above town. A.J. ran water pipes to each home. Most homes still have the pipes in them. Kingsley no longer has town water.

== Floods and 2014 Tornado ==
Kingsley has suffered from two major floods. In 1926, just after nightfall the dam at Hall Pond broke and sent a torrent of water that rushed down into town. The water went down Main Street and flooded many homes. It caused a lot of damage but no homes were lost. The Department of Forest and Waters rebuilt the dam.

On June 28, 2006, Kingsley suffered another major flood. The town experienced rainfall of a couple of inches an hour. Martins Creek overflowed its banks in the middle of the night. The culvert next to Main Street filled with rocks and overflowed down Main Street. All the townspeople were evacuated to the Mountain View High School by three that morning. Only a few houses were completely saved from water. One home was lost and five homes were severely damaged. At the Community Church, the ground was so saturated that water came through the floor.

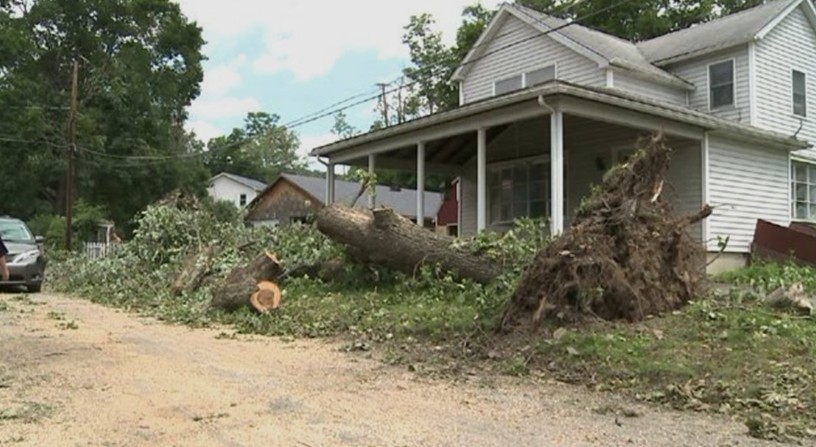
Loss of 215-year-old and 95-year-old maple trees on Mill Street

On July 8, 2014, a series of severe thunderstorms struck Susquehanna County. A tornado warning was issued for the county around 6:30 PM that evening. As one storm moved towards Kingsley from Hop Bottom, it began to rotate. Witnesses say that a twister touched down in the swamp just north of the Martins Creek Viaduct and struck Kingsley around 6:45 PM. No injuries or fatalities occurred, but many buildings, including the original Kingsley Post Office, were destroyed. Hundreds of trees were uprooted and power lines were ripped down. The town was without power for about 4 days. The forest on the hill on the east side of town was completely destroyed, and the damage is still noticeable today. The national weather service ranked the twister as an EF-2.
