= Herrick Center, Pennsylvania =

Unincorporated community in Pennsylvania, US

- Unincorporated community
- Location within Pennsylvania
- Coordinates: 41°44′31″N 75°29′22″W
- Country: United States
- State: Pennsylvania
- County: Susquehanna
- Elevation: 1,719 ft (524 m)
- Time zone: UTC-5 (Eastern (EST))
  - Summer (DST): UTC-4 (EDT)
- ZIP code: 18430
- Area codes: 272 & 570
- GNIS feature ID: 1176883

Herrick Center is an unincorporated community in Susquehanna County, Pennsylvania, United States. The community is located along Pennsylvania Route 374, 1.8 miles (2.9 km) north of Union Dale. Herrick Center had a post office until January 3, 2004; it still has its own ZIP code, 18430.
