= Richmondale, Pennsylvania =

Unincorporated community in Pennsylvania, US

- Unincorporated community
- Location within Pennsylvania Location within the United States
- Coordinates: 41°38′14″N 75°28′54″W
- Country: United States
- State: Pennsylvania
- County: Lackawanna
- Township: Fell
- Elevation: 1,709 ft (521 m)
- Time zone: UTC-5 (Eastern (EST))
  - Summer (DST): UTC-4 (EDT)
- Area codes: 570 & 272
- GNIS feature ID: 1185021

Richmondale is an unincorporated community in Fell Township, Lackawanna County, Pennsylvania, United States.
