= Fell Township, Pennsylvania =

Township in Pennsylvania, US

Fell Township
- Township
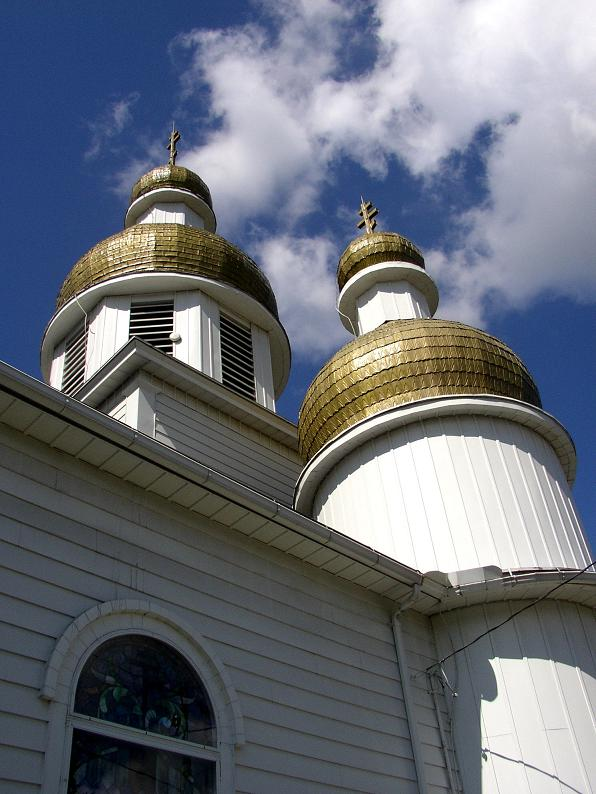
- Ukrainian Catholic church in Simpson

- Location of Pennsylvania in the United States
- Coordinates: 41°36′00″N 75°28′59″W
- Country: United States
- State: Pennsylvania
- County: Lackawanna

Area
  - Total: 15.35 sq mi (39.75 km^{2})
  - Land: 15.27 sq mi (39.55 km^{2})
  - Water: 0.077 sq mi (0.20 km^{2})
- Elevation: 1,299 ft (396 m)

Population (2020)
  - Total: 2,345 ▲
  - Estimate (2021): 2,344
  - Density: 136.2/sq mi (52.59/km^{2})
- Time zone: UTC-5 (EST)
  - Summer (DST): UTC-4 (EDT)
- Postal code: 18407
- Area code: 570
- FIPS code: 42-069-25560
- Website: https://felltownship.com/

Fell Township is a township in Lackawanna County, Pennsylvania, United States. The population was 2,345 at the 2020 census.

== Pattern of settlement ==
Fell Township's principal settlement is Simpson, as of 2010 home to 1,275 people, mostly middle age and elderly. Although not usually considered by the locals, the upper part of Carbondale's West Side is actually in the southwestern corner of the township. This area is home to a few hundred people, and is geographically separate from other settlements in Fell Township. The other settlements in Fell Township are the residential communities of Crystal Lake and Richmondale. Richmondale is currently home to 190 people. The original house in Simpson was the Morss Mansion on Lord Avenue, built in 1887. The house inspired Hank Williams' song "Mansion on the Hill". By 1974, the mansion was empty, and title of it and the surrounding property fell in the hands of the local volunteer fire company. Due to lack of maintenance, the mansion was in disrepair by the 1990s, and despite public outcry, the mansion was, tragically, torn down in the summer of 1998. The Grattan-Singer Hose Company then built a new fire house in the property.

== Geography ==
According to the United States Census Bureau, the township has a total area of 15.4 square miles (40 km^{2}), of which 15.3 square miles (40 km^{2}) is land and 0.1 square miles (0.26 km^{2}) (0.52%) is water. Fell Township also features the Lackawanna River, Panther's Creek, and many abandoned pits from strip mining.

== Demographics ==
Historical population
Census	Pop.	Note	%±
1970	2,953		—
1980	2,817		−4.6%
1990	2,426		−13.9%
2000	2,331		−3.9%
2010	2,178		−6.6%
2020	2,345		7.7%
2021 (est.)	2,344		0.0%
U.S. Decennial Census

=== 2010 census ===
As of the census of 2010, there were 2,178 people, 925 households, and 586 families residing in the township. The population density was 142.4 people per square mile (55.0 people/km^{2}). There were 1,045 housing units at an average density of 68.3 units per square mile (26.4 units/km^{2}). The racial makeup of the township was 96.6% White, 0.7% African American, 0.2% Native American, 0.3% Asian, 0.7% from other races, and 1.4% from two or more races. Hispanic or Latino of any race were 3% of the population.

There were 925 households, out of which 26.3% had children under the age of 18 living with them, 46.3% were married couples living together, 10.9% had a female householder with no husband present, and 36.6% were non-families. 30.7% of all households were made up of individuals, and 13.7% had someone living alone who was 65 years of age or older. The average household size was 2.35 and the average family size was 2.94.

In the township the population was spread out, with 20.9% under the age of 18, 61% from 18 to 64, and 18.1% who were 65 years of age or older. The median age was 41.7 years.

The median income for a household in the township was $37,727, and the median income for a family was $50,100. Males had a median income of $42,232 versus $29,250 for females. The per capita income for the township was $21,772. About 6.7% of families and 11% of the population were below the poverty line, including 11.7% of those under age 18 and 7.5% of those age 65 or over.
