= Forest City, Pennsylvania =

Borough in the United States

- Borough
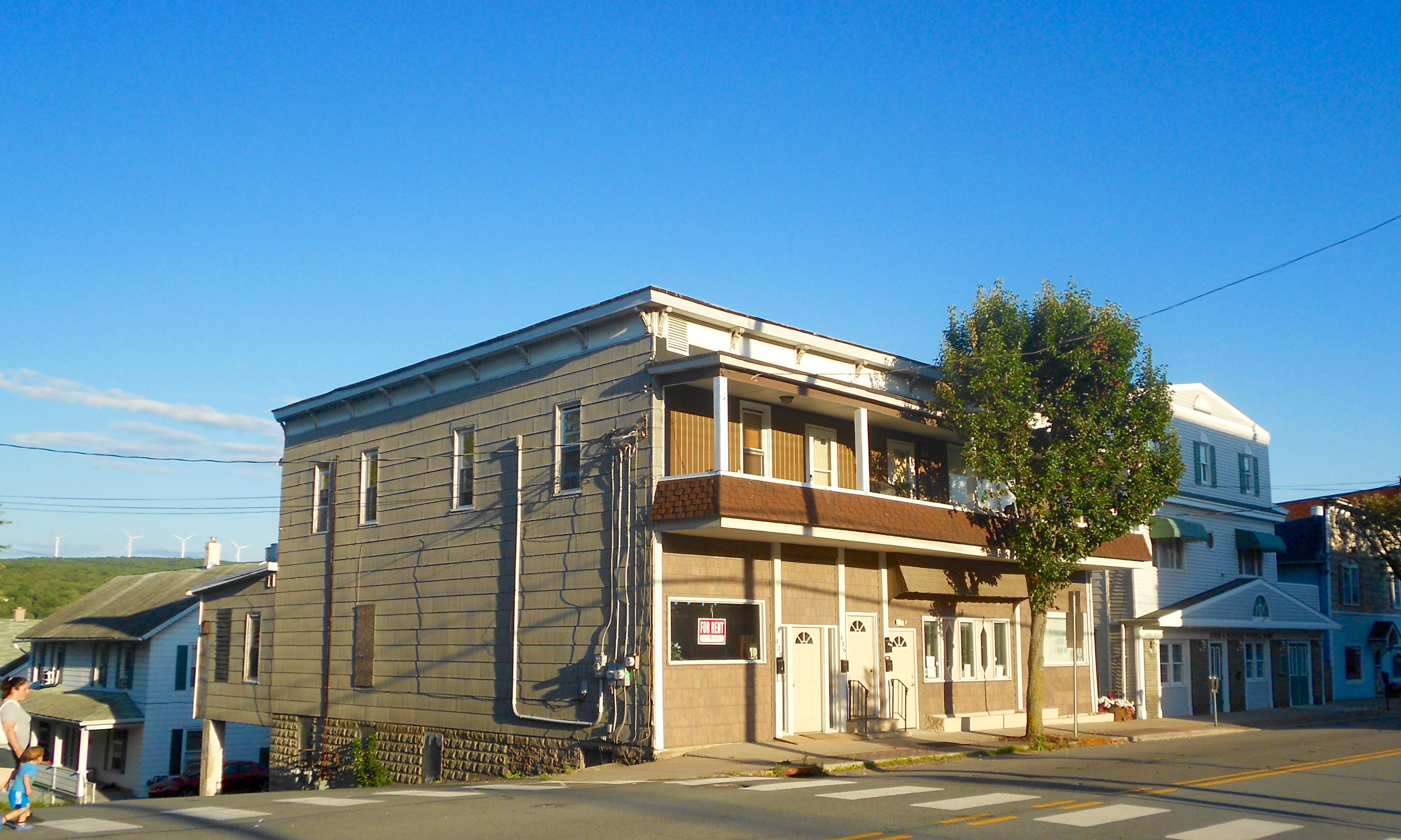
- 436 Main Street
- Motto: One Mile Of Hospitality
- Location of Forest City in Susquehanna County, Pennsylvania.

- Location within Pennsylvania Location within the United States
- Coordinates: 41°39′03″N 75°28′05″W
- Country: United States
- State: Pennsylvania
- County: Susquehanna
- Settled: 1871
- Incorporated: 1888

Area
  - Total: 0.94 sq mi (2.44 km^{2})
  - Land: 0.92 sq mi (2.37 km^{2})
  - Water: 0.027 sq mi (0.07 km^{2})

Population (2020)
  - Total: 1,780
  - Density: 1,946.3/sq mi (751.47/km^{2})
- Time zone: UTC-5 (Eastern (EST))
  - Summer (DST): UTC-4 (EDT)
- Zip code: 18421
- Area code: 570
- FIPS code: 42-26560
- Website: www.forestcityborough.com

Forest City is a borough in Susquehanna County, Pennsylvania, United States, situated at the corner of Susquehanna, Lackawanna and Wayne counties and is designated by a marker which is located in the Forest City Industrial Park.

Forest City is four avenues by 10 blocks as the 'main city', with a small surrounding suburb housing 1,748 in the 2020 census, with 87% of the population living 'in town'.

At its height in the early twentieth century, between the timber, silk, lumber and coal industries, the population was close to 6,000—a booming town with a busy Main Street.

== Pre-history ==
The land that is Forest City and the surrounding area was originally part of the Delaware-Munsee Indian Tribe. By the time it became Forest City, it had been unoccupied, virgin land.

== History ==
The land that would become Forest City had been known as "Forest Mills" since the 1850s. From 1879 to 1886, the post office was called "Pentecost". It was named after one of the first local settlers, William Pentecost, who had started the lumbering and milling industries in the area. The post office was renamed Forest City in 1886, and the Forest City borough was formed in 1888.

Between 1866 and 1871, the Jefferson Branch, a railroad spur of the D & H Canal Company, was built in Forest Mills. It ran between Susquehanna Depot and Carbondale, transporting the harvested lumber. Lumbering was the only industry of this area, with the exception of a small mining operation run by William Pentecost, which supplied only sufficient coal to neighboring farmers with winter fuel.

In 1871, an outcropping of coal was discovered. The Hillside Coal and Iron Company bought large tracts of land in the area, and by 1872 the first commercially profitable coal mining enterprise was established at North Railroad Street. A small breaker erected on Railroad Street processed the 75-ton daily output from this operation until 1883.

In 1886, another shaft, Shaft No. 2, was opened. This brought an influx of miners, mostly Welsh, into the area. There were now 300 men and boys employed in the production of coal.

On April 1, 1916, there was a supposed mine collapse at Shaft #2 that most notably killed 7 Welsh mining-boys between the ages of 6 and 11. This event was the basis for the song "Crugybar o frynian caersalem" performed by the Wilkes-Barre Quartet in 1922, which commemorates the event, as the boys were "fresh off the boat" from the Salem's Hills area of Northeast Wales. However state records and local historical society records have no record of this accident happening.

Coal mining continued until The Great Depression hit this town hard, as primary sector of the economy products as lumber and coal were hardest hit. The population slowly dwindled as the coal mining came to a halt. Today, the Forest City Area Historical Society serves as a reminder of this once flourishing coal town.

There are important agricultural interests in the region. At the onset of the twentieth century, coal-mining and silk manufacturing were the chief industries, but with the onset of The Great Depression in the 1920s, businesses decreased to a core of generational store owners.

2017 was a turnaround year for Forest City. In August 2017, a sweeping fire destroyed 25% of the storefronts in town. Then in September, a sudden real estate frenzy bought all lower priced houses in town. Additionally, according to US census records, the highest age percentile decreased below the 35 to 59 age percentile, the first time since 1910. Historically, this signifies the onset of gentrification.

== Geography ==
Forest City is 23 miles (37 km) north by east of Scranton.

Forest City is located at 41°39′3″N 75°28′5″W (41.650907, -75.468180).

According to the United States Census Bureau, the borough has a total area of 0.9 square miles (2.3 km^{2}), of which 0.9 square miles (2.3 km^{2}) is land and 0.04 square miles (0.10 km^{2}) (3.23%) is water.

== Demographics ==
Historical population
Census	Pop.	Note	%±
1870	993		—
1880	990		−0.3%
1890	2,319		134.2%
1900	4,279		84.5%
1910	5,749		34.4%
1920	6,004		4.4%
1930	5,209		−13.2%
1940	4,266		−18.1%
1950	3,122		−26.8%
1960	2,651		−15.1%
1970	2,322		−12.4%
1980	1,924		−17.1%
1990	1,846		−4.1%
2000	1,855		0.5%
2010	1,911		3.0%
2020	1,780		−6.9%
2021 (est.)	1,741	▼	−2.2%

As of the census of 2010, there were 1,911 people, 817 households, and 462 families residing in the borough.

The entire village is only .9034 square miles or 2.33 km^{2}.

There were 817 households, out of which 28.3% had children under the age of 18 living with them, 34.6% were married couples living together, 15.1% had a female householder with no husband present, and 43.5% were non-families. 39.2% of all households were made up of individuals, and 23.5% had someone living alone who was 65 years of age or older. The average household size was 2.23 and the average family size was 2.91.

The median age was 47. For every 100 females, there were 84.0 males. For every 100 females age 18 and over, there were 78.0 males.

The median income for a household in the borough was $33,618, and the median income for a family was $41,985. The per capita income for the borough was $19,245. About 6.4% of families and 21.3% of the population were living below the poverty line, including 28.4% of those under age 18 and 17.4% of those age 65 or over.

== Churches ==
Due to the historical influx of immigrants settling in primary sector of the economy towns such as Forest City, as each successive ethnic minority would build their own church. In its height in the 1920s, Forest City was known as "the town with the most churches in it" to the locals.

Until recently, Forest City's overwhelmingly Roman Catholic population boasted five churches: St. Anthony, St. Michael, St. Agnes, St. Joseph, and Sacred Heart. Each of these churches were ethnic, St. Agnes being Irish, St. Anthony's was Lithuanian; St. Michael's was Slovak; St. Joseph's was Slovenian; and Sacred Heart was Polish. Early consolidations were planned in the 1970s, but public resistance kept some of the buildings intermittently open for decades. The Ascension of Our Lord Parish was created and dedicated in 2010, and the worship site, St. Joseph's Church, was renovated to accommodate the merger.

Forest City is also home to an Episcopal church, a Byzantine Catholic church, and a non-denominational church. The Methodist Church closed May 2013 and the building was generously donated to the Forest City Area Historical Society which is now society headquarters and museum.

== Senior care ==
The William Penn apartment complex for seniors is on Main Street and the Forest City Nursing and Rehab Center is on Delaware Street. This represents up to 7% of the population of Forest City.

== Government and services ==
Forest City has its own police department which serves some surrounding municipalities on a contractual basis. The police department consists of a Police Chief, Assistant Police Chief and several Patrol Officers. The police department is located on the second floor of Forest City's Boro Hall, which also is the office for town's mayor. Boro Hall also houses the Forest City Library.

Forest City has two parks: John F. Kennedy Park and Babe Ruth Park. Kennedy Park, located on Pennsylvania Route 247, five blocks from Main Street, has a lake, baseball fields, tennis and basketball courts, frisbee golf course, playground, and nature trail. Babe Ruth Park is located on Railroad Street and features a playground, playing field, and a basketball court.

Forest City used to hold an annual festival called "Old Home Week” Economics, and the donations of the few Forest City businesses has made it unsustainable as a week-long event.

Forest City is the starting point to the Steamtown Marathon, which is held the Sunday before Columbus Day.

== Education ==
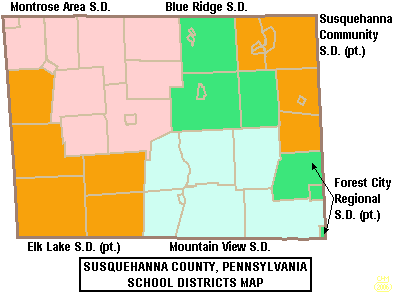
Map of Susquehanna County, Pennsylvania School Districts

Forest City Regional School District is a Preschool-12th grade public school district serving residents of Forest City.

According to the 2010 census, there are at least 17 students per grade living in Forest City.

== Notable people ==
- Samuel Rothafel, founder of Radio City Music Hall
- Anthony J. Burshnick, retired Air Force general
