= List of bridges documented by the Historic American Engineering Record in New York =

This is a list of bridges documented by the Historic American Engineering Record in the US state of New York.

== Bridges ==
Survey No.	Name (as assigned by HAER)	Status	Type	Built	Documented	Carries	Crosses	Location	County	Coordinates
NJ-66	Bayonne Bridge	Extant	Steel arch	1931	1987	NY 440 and Route 440	Kill Van Kull	Staten Island, New York, and Bayonne, New Jersey	Richmond County, New York, and Hudson County, New Jersey	40°38′31″N 74°08′31″W
NY-4	Whipple Cast and Wrought Iron Bowstring Truss Bridge	Relocated	Bowstring arch truss	1867	1969	Mill Road	Normans Kill tributary	Albany	Albany	42°38′09″N 73°48′02″W
NY-6	Erie Canal (Enlarged), Schoharie Creek Aqueduct	Ruin	Stone arch	1841	1969	Erie Canal	Schoharie Creek	Fort Hunter	Montgomery	42°56′23″N 74°17′11″W
NY-10	Hawk Street Viaduct	Demolished	Cantilever	1890	1969	Hawk Street	Sheridan Hollow	Albany	Albany	42°39′16″N 73°45′19″W
NY-12	Erie Canal (Enlarged), Upper Mohawk River Aqueduct	Ruin	Stone arch	1842	1969	Erie Canal	Mohawk River	Rexford	Saratoga	42°51′1″N 73°53′15″W
NY-18	Brooklyn Bridge	Extant	Suspension	1883	1978		East River	Brooklyn and Manhattan	Kings and New York	40°42′20″N 73°59′47″W
NY-19	Queensboro Bridge	Extant	Cantilever	1909	1983	NY 25	East River	Long Island City and Manhattan	Queens and New York	40°45′25″N 73°57′16″W
NY-27	Erie Railway, Oquaga Creek Bridge	Extant	Lattice truss		1971	Erie Railroad (former)	Oquaga Creek	Deposit	Broome	42°03′4″N 75°26′33″W
NY-28	Erie Railway, Delaware Division, Bridge 175.53	Extant	Lattice truss		1971	Erie Railroad (former)	West Branch Delaware River	Deposit	Broome	42°03′31″N 75°25′16″W
NY-29	Erie Railway, Clear Creek Viaduct	Extant	Trestle		1971	Buffalo Southern Railroad	North Branch of Clear Creek	Lawtons	Erie	42°31′18″N 78°55′53″W
NY-42	Erie Railway, Allegany Division, Bridge 367.33	Demolished	Trestle		1971	Erie Railroad (former)	Rush Creek	Fillmore	Allegany	42°26′57″N 78°05′09″W
NY-43	Erie Railway, Allegany Division, Bridge 375.41	Demolished	Trestle		1971	Erie Railroad (former)	Genesee River	Belfast	Allegany	42°21′34″N 78°07′16″W
NY-44	Baltimore and Ohio Railroad, Parallel Pratt Thru-Truss Bridge	Extant (partial)	Pratt truss		1971	Baltimore and Ohio Railroad (former)	Allegheny River	Limestone	Cattaraugus	42°04′55″N 78°38′33″W
NY-51	Lehigh Valley Railroad, Baltimore Through-Truss Bridge	Demolished	Baltimore truss		1971	Lehigh Valley Railroad (former)	Delaware, Lackawanna and Western Railroad (former)	Batavia	Genesee	42°59′30″N 78°07′13″W
NY-54	Erie Railway, Buffalo Division, Bridge 361.66	Replaced	Trestle	1875	1971	Norfolk Southern Railway	Genesee River and NY 436	Portageville	Wyoming	42°34′40″N 78°02′58″W
NY-62	Erie Railway, Moodna Creek Viaduct	Extant	Trestle	1909	1971	Metro-North Railroad Port Jervis Line	Moodna Creek	Salisbury Mills	Orange	41°25′49″N 74°05′57″W
NY-66	New York, Ontario and Western Railroad, Delaware River Bridge	Demolished	Warren truss		1971	New York, Ontario and Western Railway (former)	Delaware River	Hancock, New York, and Buckingham Township, Pennsylvania	Delaware County, New York, and Wayne County, Pennsylvania	41°57′16″N 75°17′56″W
NY-79	Lordville Suspension Bridge	Replaced	Suspension	1904	1971	Lordville Road	Delaware River	Lordville, New York, and Equinunk, Pennsylvania	Delaware County, New York, and Wayne County, Pennsylvania	41°52′04″N 75°12′50″W
NY-81	Long Island Railroad, Manhasset Bridge	Extant	Trestle	1898	1974	LIRR Port Washington Branch	Manhasset Bay	Manhasset	Nassau	40°47′34″N 73°42′34″W
NY-88	New York Connecting Railroad, Hell Gate Bridge	Extant	Steel arch	1916	1991	Amtrak Northeast Corridor	Hell Gate	Wards Island and Astoria	New York and Queens	40°46′57″N 73°55′18″W
NY-95	Erie Railway, Sawyer Creek Bridge	Replaced	Pratt truss		1971	Erie Railroad (former)	Sawyer Creek	Martinsville	Niagara	43°03′33″N 78°50′13″W
NY-101	Baltimore and Ohio Railroad, Baltimore Skewed Thru-Truss Bridge	Extant	Baltimore truss		1971	Baltimore and Ohio Railroad (former)		Salamanca	Cattaraugus	42°06′30″N 78°39′6″W
NY-108	Old Croton Aqueduct, Indian Creek Culvert	Extant	Culvert	1838	1984	Croton Aqueduct	Indian Brook	Ossining	Westchester	41°11′28″N 73°52′6″W
NY-110	Old Croton Aqueduct, Sing Sing Kill Bridge	Extant	Stone arch	1839	1984	Croton Aqueduct	Sing Sing Kill	Ossining	Westchester	41°09′47″N 73°51′48″W
NY-112	Old Croton Aqueduct, Mill River Culvert	Extant	Culvert	1841	1984	Croton Aqueduct	Pocantico River	Tarrytown	Westchester	41°05′57″N 73°51′25″W
NY-114	Old Croton Aqueduct, Jewels Brook Culvert	Extant	Culvert	1839	1984	Croton Aqueduct	Station Road	Irvington	Westchester	41°02′08″N 73°52′02″W
NY-117	Old Croton Aqueduct, Quarry Railroad Bridge	Extant	Stone arch	1839	1984	Croton Aqueduct		Hastings-on-Hudson	Westchester	40°59′23″N 73°52′56″W
NY-118	Old Croton Aqueduct, Saw Mill River Culvert	Extant	Stone arch	1839	1984	Croton Aqueduct	Nepperhan Avenue	Yonkers	Westchester	40°56′13″N 73°53′13″W
NY-119	Old Croton Aqueduct, Harlem River Crossing	Extant	Steel arch	1848	1984	Croton Aqueduct	Harlem River	The Bronx and Manhattan	Bronx and New York	40°50′32″N 73°55′49″W
NY-127	Manhattan Bridge	Extant	Suspension	1909	1983	Flatbush Avenue Extension and B and D N and Q trains of New York City Subway	East River	Brooklyn and Manhattan	Kings and New York	40°42′26″N 73°59′27″W
NY-128	Williamsburg Bridge	Extant	Suspension	1903	1983	Roadway and J and Z M trains of New York City Subway	East River	Williamsburg and Manhattan	Kings and New York	40°42′49″N 73°58′20″W
NY-129	George Washington Bridge	Extant	Suspension	1931	1983	I-95 / US 1-9 (entire span) and US 46 (NJ side)	Hudson River	Manhattan, New York, and Fort Lee, New Jersey	New York County, New York, and Bergen County, New Jersey	40°51′06″N 73°57′09″W
NY-130	Washington Bridge	Extant	Steel arch	1888	1983	181st Street	Harlem River	Manhattan and The Bronx	New York and Bronx	40°50′49″N 73°55′41″W
NY-131	Poughkeepsie Bridge	Extant	Cantilever	1889	1978	Walkway Over the Hudson	Hudson River	Poughkeepsie and Highland	Dutchess and Ulster	41°42′38″N 73°56′40″W
NY-133	West Side Highway	Demolished	Viaduct	1929	1974	NY 9A	Various streets	Manhattan	New York	40°43′31″N 74°00′40″W
NY-140	Fillmore Bridge	Replaced	Lenticular truss	1902	1985	CR 4 (East Main Street)	Genesee River	Fillmore	Allegany	42°27′50″N 78°06′16″W
NY-148	New York and Mahopac Railroad, Bridge L-158	Extant	Whipple truss	1883	1984	New York and Mahopac Railroad (former)	Muscoot Reservoir	Golden's Bridge	Westchester	41°17′47″N 73°40′58″W
NY-149	Shaw Bridge	Abandoned	Bowstring arch truss	1870	1994	Van Wyck Lane	Claverack Creek	Claverack	Columbia	42°12′55″N 73°43′44″W
NY-150	Driving Park Avenue Bridge	Extant	Steel arch	1890	1983	Driving Park Avenue and Avenue E	Genesee River Gorge	Rochester	Monroe	43°10′52″N 77°37′42″W
NY-152	Erie Canal (Enlarged), Oothout Culvert and Waste Weir		Culvert	1838	1981	Erie Canal		Colonie	Albany	
NY-153	Hegeman–Hill Street Bridge	Replaced	Baltimore truss	1901	1986	Hegeman Bridge Road	Batten Kill	Easton	Washington	43°05′20″N 73°31′16″W
NY-157	Eagle's Nest Creek Culvert		Culvert	1820	1983	Erie Canal	Eagle's Nest Creek	Cohoes	Albany	42°45′51″N 73°42′08″W
NY-160	Mid-Hudson Suspension Bridge	Extant	Suspension	1930	1986	US 44 / NY 55	Hudson River	Poughkeepsie and Highland	Dutchess and Ulster	41°42′11″N 73°56′46″W
NY-163	Jones Beach Causeway Bridge No. 1	Replaced	Reinforced concrete T-beam	1929	1987	Wantagh State Parkway	Seamans Island Creek	Hempstead	Nassau	40°38′24″N 73°30′26″W
NY-166	Ouaquaga Bridge	Bypassed	Lenticular truss	1889	1987	Dutchtown Road	Susquehanna River	Ouaquaga	Broome	42°07′25″N 75°38′50″W
NY-167	Boatlanding Bridge	Replaced	Reinforced concrete closed-spandrel arch	1911	1987	Sixth Avenue	Chadakoin River	Jamestown	Chautauqua	42°05′55″N 79°15′11″W
NY-168	Tioronda Bridge|	Demolished	Bowstring arch truss	1873	1987	South Avenue	Fishkill Creek	Beacon	Dutchess	41°29′19″N 73°58′27″W
NY-169	Upper Bridge	Abandoned	Pratt truss	1878	1987	Liberty Street	Ausable River	Keeseville	Essex	44°30′02″N 73°29′07″W
NY-170	Jay Covered Bridge	Bypassed	Howe truss	1857	1987	CR 22	Ausable River east branch	Jay	Essex	44°22′23″N 73°43′30″W
NY-171	Rolling Hill Mill Road Bridge	Replaced	Pratt truss	1879	1987	Grove Road	Ausable River east branch	Au Sable Forks	Essex	44°26′22″N 73°40′30″W
NY-172	Uncle Sam Bridge	Replaced	Strauss bascule	1930	1987	CR 385 (Bridge Street)	Catskill Creek	Catskill	Greene	42°13′02″N 73°52′02″W
NY-173	Court Street Bridge	Replaced	Reinforced concrete through arch	1921	1987	US 11 / NY 12	Black River	Watertown	Jefferson	43°58′50″N 75°54′51″W
NY-174	Lafayette–Spring Street Bridge	Replaced	Reinforced concrete open-spandrel arch	1919	1987	Lafayette and Spring streets	Oswegatchie River	Ogdensburg	St. Lawrence	44°41′25″N 75°29′38″W
NY-175	Main Street Bridge	Extant	Stone arch	1857	1987	Main Street	Genesee River	Rochester	Monroe	43°09′22″N 77°36′39″W
NY-176	Prospect Street Bridge	Extant	Stone arch	1875	1987	Prospect Street	Chuctanunda Creek	Amsterdam	Montgomery	42°56′24″N 74°11′11″W
NY-177	Jones Beach State Parkway Channel Bascule Bridge LP-2	Extant	Simple trunnion bascule	1934	1987	Loop Parkway	Long Creek	Hempstead	Nassau	40°36′16″N 73°34′11″W
NY-178	Jones Beach State Parkway Channel Bascule Bridge MP-3	Extant	Simple trunnion bascule	1934	1987	Meadowbrook State Parkway	Jones Bay	Hempstead	Nassau	40°36′01″N 73°32′36″W
NY-179	Rome–Westernville Road Bridge	Extant	Pratt truss	1884	1987	Golf Course Road	Mohawk River	Rome	Oneida	43°16′23″N 75°25′48″W
NY-180	Blood Road Bridge and Woodworth Road Bridge	Replaced	Pratt truss	1899	1987	Blood Road	Johnson Creek	Lyndonville	Orleans	43°20′08″N 78°21′32″W
NY-181	Locust Street Bridge	Extant	Reinforced concrete closed-spandrel arch	1914	1987	Locust Street	Seneca River old channel	Waterloo	Seneca	42°54′06″N 76°51′52″W
NY-182	Quantuck Canal Bridge	Extant	Strauss bascule	1935	1987	Beach Lane	Quantuck Canal	Westhampton Beach	Suffolk	40°48′03″N 72°37′41″W
NY-183	Snyder Hollow Bridge	Replaced	Warren truss	1883	1987	Woodland Valley Road	Esopus Creek	Phoenicia	Ulster	42°04′54″N 74°19′46″W
NY-184	Saunders Street Bridge	Replaced	Baltimore truss	1911	1987	Saunders Street	Champlain Canal	Whitehall	Washington	43°33′19″N 73°24′06″W
NY-185	Sandy Hill Bridge	Bypassed	Reinforced concrete closed-spandrel arch	1907	1987	Bridge Street	Hudson River	Hudson Falls and South Glens Falls	Washington and Saratoga County	43°17′50″N 73°35′23″W
NY-186	Cemetery Road Bridge	Replaced	Lenticular truss	1888	1987	Cemetery Road	Black Creek	Salem	Washington	43°09′39″N 73°22′12″W
NY-187	Creager's Bridge	Replaced	Parker truss	1916	1987	CR 334 (Cole Road)	Erie Canal	Lyons	Wayne	43°01′47″N 76°57′14″W
NY-192	Central Park Bridges, Bridge No. 24	Extant	Cast iron arch	1864	1984	Pedestrian path	Bridle path	Manhattan	New York	40°46′55″N 73°57′46″W
NY-193	Central Park Bridges, Bridge No. 27	Extant	Cast iron arch	1864	1984	Pedestrian path	Bridle path	Manhattan	New York	40°47′04″N 73°57′58″W
NY-194	Central Park Bridges, Gothic Arch (Bridge No. 28)	Extant	Cast iron arch	1864	1984	Pedestrian path	Bridle path	Manhattan	New York	40°47′20″N 73°57′43″W
NY-195	Central Park Bridges, Bow Bridge (Bridge No. 5)	Extant	Cast iron arch	1859	1984	Pedestrian path	The Lake	Manhattan	New York	40°46′33″N 73°58′19″W
NY-196	Central Park Bridges, Pinebank Arch (Bridge No. 15)	Extant	Cast iron arch	1861	1984	Pedestrian path	Bridle path	Manhattan	New York	40°46′09″N 73°58′44″W
NY-199	University Heights Bridge	Extant	Swing span	1895	1988	West 207th Street and West Fordham Road	Harlem River	Manhattan and The Bronx	New York and Bronx	40°51′46″N 73°54′54″W
NY-204	Philipse Manor Station, Pedestrian Bridge	Extant	Steel built-up girder	1910	1988	Pedestrian way	Metro-North Railroad Hudson Line	Mount Pleasant	Westchester	41°05′41″N 73°52′10″W
NY-268	Mill Street Bridge	Replaced	Pratt truss	1887	1992	Mill Street	Susquehanna River	Cooperstown	Otsego	42°41′39″N 74°55′16″W
NY-269	Macombs Dam Bridge	Extant	Swing span	1895	1994	West 155th Street	Harlem River	Manhattan and The Bronx	New York and Bronx	40°49′41″N 73°56′02″W
NY-273	Watkins Glen Iron Foot Bridge	Extant	Pratt truss	1873	1994	Trail in Watkins Glen State Park	Glen Creek	Watkins Glen	Schuyler	42°22′28″N 76°52′35″W
NY-274	Beech Road Bridge	Extant	Bowstring arch truss		1994	Beech Road	West Branch of Cayuga Inlet	Newfield	Tompkins	42°21′41″N 76°35′39″W
NY-275	Burdick Avenue Bridge	Abandoned	Bowstring arch truss		1994	Burdick Avenue	Cowaselon Creek	Lenox	Madison	43°05′59″N 75°41′49″W
NY-276	Chili Mills Bridge	Extant	Bowstring arch truss		1994	Stuart Road	Black Creek	Chili Center	Monroe	43°05′05″N 77°48′47″W
NY-277	Avery-Bartholomew Patent Railroad Iron Bridge	Relocated	Bowstring arch truss	1877	1994			Groton	Tompkins	42°35′25″N 76°22′08″W
NY-282	Cayadutta Creek Bridge	Replaced	Bowstring arch truss		1994	Private road	Cayadutta Creek	Fonda	Montgomery	42°57′21″N 74°23′06″W
NY-283	Johnstown Bridge	Relocated	Bowstring arch truss		1994	Path on Union College campus	Unnamed stream	Schenectady	Schenectady	42°49′05″N 73°55′27″W
NY-284	Ehrmanteraut Farm Bridge		Bowstring arch truss		1994	Farm Road	Black Creek	Riga	Monroe	
NY-285	Whittlesey Road Bridge	Demolished	Bowstring arch truss		1994	Whittlesey Road	Black River	Lyons Falls	Lewis	43°39′07″N 75°22′15″W
NY-287	Talcottville Bridge	Demolished	Bowstring arch truss		1994	Cheese Factory Road	Sugar River	Talcottville	Lewis	43°32′06″N 75°22′06″W
NY-288	Mill Road Bridge	Relocated	King post truss		1994	Trail in Central Park	Unnamed stream	Schenectady	Schenectady	42°48′5″N 73°54′37″W
NY-289	Sparkill Creek Drawbridge	Bypassed	Simple trunnion bascule	1880	1994	Bridge Street	Sparkill Creek	Piermont	Rockland	41°02′15″N 73°54′57″W
NY-291	Cooper's Tubular Arch Bridge	Extant	Bowstring arch truss	1886	1994	New York State Canalway Trail	Old Erie Canal	DeWitt	Onondaga	43°02′38″N 76°02′18″W
NY-292	Old Corinth Road Bridge	Extant	Lenticular truss	1885	1994	CR 1 (Old Corinth Road)	Sacandaga River	Hadley	Saratoga	43°18′50″N 73°50′42″W
NY-293	Grant Road Bridge	Abandoned	Lenticular truss	1883	1994	Grant Road	Raquette River	Raymondville	St. Lawrence	44°50′23″N 74°58′46″W
NY-296	Spile Bridge Road Bridge	Extant	Bowstring arch truss		1994	Spile Bridge Road	Black Lake	Oswegatchie	St. Lawrence	44°36′57″N 75°28′37″W
NY-301	Triborough Bridge	Extant	Suspension	1936	1991	I-278 Toll	Harlem River, Bronx Kill, and Hell Gate	Queens, Manhattan, and the Bronx	Queens, New York, and Bronx	40°47′50″N 73°55′12″W
NY-302	Alexander Hamilton Bridge	Extant	Steel arch	1963	1991	I-95 / US 1	Harlem River	Manhattan and the Bronx	New York and Bronx	40°50′44″N 73°55′43″W
NY-303	Verrazzano–Narrows Bridge	Extant	Suspension	1964	1991	I-278 Toll	The Narrows	Brooklyn and Staten Island	Kings and Richmond	40°36′23″N 74°02′44″W
NY-304	Outerbridge Crossing	Extant	Cantilever	1928	1991	NY 440 and Route 440	Arthur Kill	Staten Island, New York, and Perth Amboy, New Jersey	Richmond County, New York, and Middlesex County, New Jersey	40°31′30″N 74°14′48″W
NY-305	Goethals Bridge	Replaced	Cantilever	1928	1991	I-278	Arthur Kill	Staten Island, New York, and Elizabeth, New Jersey	Richmond County, New York, and Union County, New Jersey	40°38′09″N 74°11′49″W
NY-306	Throgs Neck Bridge	Extant	Suspension	1964	1991	I-295 Toll	East River	Bay Terrace and Throggs Neck	Queens and Bronx	40°48′01″N 73°47′36″W
NY-308	Bronx–Whitestone Bridge	Extant	Suspension	1939	1991	I-678 Toll	East River	Whitestone and Throggs Neck	Queens and Bronx	40°48′03″N 73°49′50″W
NY-314	Little Hell Gate Bridge	Demolished	Steel arch		1996		Little Hell Gate	Randalls and Wards Islands	New York	40°47′28″N 73°55′27″W
NY-315	Aldrich Towing-Path Change Bridge	Relocated	Pratt truss	1858	1998	Pedestrian way	New York State Canalway Trail	Palmyra	Wayne	43°03′51″N 77°14′50″W
NY-317	Vanderbilt Mansion Roads and Bridges				1999	US 9		Hyde Park	Dutchess	41°47′51″N 73°56′22″W
NY-318	White Bridge	Extant	Reinforced concrete closed-spandrel arch	1897	1999	NPS Route 10	Crum Elbow Creek	Hyde Park	Dutchess	41°47′40″N 73°56′23″W
NY-319	Bard Rock Bridge	Extant	Steel built-up girder	1912	1999	Bard Rock Drive	New York Central Railroad (former)	Hyde Park	Dutchess	41°48′18″N 73°56′36″W
NY-320	Dock Street Bridge	Extant	Stone arch	1900	1999	Dock Street	Crum Elbow Creek	Hyde Park	Dutchess	41°47′21″N 73°56′43″W
NY-321	Rustic Bridge	Extant	Reinforced concrete closed-spandrel arch	1900	1999	NPS Route 13	Crum Elbow Creek	Hyde Park	Dutchess	41°47′27″N 73°56′32″W
NY-322	U.S. Route No. 9 Bridge	Extant	Reinforced concrete closed-spandrel arch	1898	1999	US 9	Crum Elbow Creek	Hyde Park	Dutchess	41°47′45″N 73°56′19″W
NY-323	Trail Bridge	Extant	Warren truss		1999	Coal Dock Lane	New York Central Railroad (former)	Hyde Park	Dutchess	41°46′33″N 73°56′52″W
NY-324	NPS Route No. 401 Bridge	Extant	Timber stringer		1999	NPS Route 401	Fall Kill	Hyde Park	Dutchess	41°45′44″N 73°53′59″W
NY-329	Beaverkill Bridge	Extant	Lattice truss	1865	2003	CR 30 (Campsite Road)	Beaver Kill	Roscoe	Sullivan	41°58′54″N 74°50′10″W
NY-330	Hyde Hall Bridge	Extant	Burr truss	1825	2002	East Lake Road (former)	Shadow Brook	East Springfield	Otsego	42°47′25″N 74°51′49″W
NY-331	Blenheim Bridge	Reconstructed	Howe truss	1855	2004	River Road (former)	Schoharie Creek	North Blenheim	Schoharie	42°28′21″N 74°26′29″W
NY-332	Powerscourt Bridge	Extant	McCallum truss	1861	2004	First Concession Road	Chateauguay River	Chateaugay, New York, and Hinchinbrooke, Quebec	Franklin County, New York and Huntingdon County, Quebec	45°00′31″N 74°09′34″W
NY-456	New York State Barge Canal, Fairport Lift Bridge	Extant	Vertical-lift bridge	1913	2009	NY 250 (Main Street)	New York State Barge Canal	Fairport	Monroe	43°06′06″N 77°26′31″W
NY-465	New York State Barge Canal, Genesee Valley Park Bridges	Extant	Reinforced concrete closed-spandrel arch	1918	2009	Genesee Valley Park trails	New York State Barge Canal	Rochester	Monroe	43°07′14″N 77°38′26″W
NY-471	New York State Barge Canal, Union Street Lift Bridge	Extant	Vertical-lift bridge	1913	2009	Union Street	New York State Barge Canal	Spencerport	Monroe	43°11′37″N 77°48′01″W
NY-473	New York State Barge Canal, Washington Street Lift Bridge	Extant	Vertical-lift bridge	1913	2009	Washington Street	New York State Barge Canal	Spencerport	Monroe	43°11′44″N 77°51′13″W
NY-476	New York State Barge Canal, Main Street Lift Bridge (Brockport)	Extant	Vertical-lift bridge	1915	2009	Main Street	New York State Barge Canal	Brockport	Monroe	43°13′01″N 77°56′18″W
NY-477	New York State Barge Canal, Park Avenue Lift Bridge	Extant	Vertical-lift bridge	1913	2009	Park Avenue	New York State Barge Canal	Brockport	Monroe	43°12′56″N 77°56′07″W
NY-481	New York State Barge Canal, East Avenue Lift Bridge	Extant	Vertical-lift bridge	1914	2009	East Avenue	New York State Barge Canal	Holley	Orleans	43°13′43″N 78°01′19″W
NY-485	New York State Barge Canal, Hulberton Road Lift Bridge	Extant	Vertical-lift bridge	1913	2009	CR 24 (Hulberton Road)	New York State Barge Canal	Hulberton	Orleans	43°15′16″N 78°03′59″W
NY-487	New York State Barge Canal, Ingersoll Street Lift Bridge	Extant	Vertical-lift bridge	1914	2009	Ingersoll Street	New York State Barge Canal	Albion	Orleans	43°14′54″N 78°11′26″W
NY-488	New York State Barge Canal, Main Street Lift Bridge (Albion)	Extant	Vertical-lift bridge	1913	2009	Main Street	New York State Barge Canal	Albion	Orleans	43°14′57″N 78°11′37″W
NY-492	New York State Barge Canal, Eagle Harbor Road Lift Bridge	Extant	Vertical-lift bridge	1910	2009	Eagle Harbor Road	New York State Barge Canal	Gaines	Orleans	43°15′06″N 78°15′12″W
NY-494	New York State Barge Canal, Knowlesville Road Lift Bridge	Extant	Vertical-lift bridge	1910	2009	Knowlesville Road	New York State Barge Canal	Ridgeway	Orleans	43°14′33″N 78°18′38″W
NY-495	New York State Barge Canal, Culvert Road (Medina Culvert)	Extant	Stone arch	1823	2009	Culvert Road	New York State Barge Canal	Ridgeway	Orleans	43°14′07″N 78°20′25″W
NY-499	New York State Barge Canal, Prospect Avenue Lift Bridge	Extant	Vertical-lift bridge	1915	2009	NY 63 (Prospect Avenue)	New York State Barge Canal	Medina	Orleans	43°13′32″N 78°23′31″W
NY-502	New York State Barge Canal, Main Street Lift Bridge (Middleport)	Extant	Vertical-lift bridge	1915	2009	NY 271 (Main Street)	New York State Barge Canal	Middleport	Niagara	43°12′47″N 78°28′36″W
NY-508	New York State Barge Canal, Hartland Road Lift Bridge	Extant	Vertical-lift bridge	1913	2009	Hartland Road	New York State Barge Canal	Gasport	Niagara	43°11′58″N 78°34′33″W
NY-510	New York State Barge Canal, Adams Street Lift Bridge	Extant	Vertical-lift bridge	1917	2009	Adams Street	New York State Barge Canal	Lockport	Niagara	43°10′43″N 78°40′59″W
NY-511	New York State Barge Canal, Exchange Street Lift Bridge	Extant	Vertical-lift bridge	1915	2009	Exchange Street	New York State Barge Canal	Lockport	Niagara	43°10′37″N 78°41′09″W
NY-541	Lake Champlain Bridge	Replaced	Continuous truss	1929	2010	NY 185 and VT 17	Lake Champlain	Crown Point, New York and Chimney Point, Vermont	Essex County, New York and Addison County, Vermont	44°01′57″N 73°25′24″W
NY-549	International Railway Bridge	Extant	Swing span	1873	1992	Canadian National Railway	Niagara River	Buffalo, New York, and Fort Erie, Ontario	Erie County, New York, and Regional Municipality of Niagara	42°55′46″N 78°54′29″W
NY-550	Peace Bridge	Extant	Parker truss	1927	1992	I-190/ Queen Elizabeth Way	Niagara River	Buffalo, New York, and Fort Erie, Ontario	Erie County, New York, and Regional Municipality of Niagara	42°54′25″N 78°54′20″W
NY-551	Rainbow Bridge	Extant	Steel arch	1941	1992	NY 384 / NY 104/ Regional Road 420	Niagara River	Niagara Falls, New York, and Niagara Falls, Ontario	Niagara County, New York, and Regional Municipality of Niagara	43°05′25″N 79°04′04″W
NY-552	Lewiston–Queenston Bridge	Extant	Steel arch	1962	1992	I-190/ Highway 405	Niagara River	Lewiston, New York, and Queenston, Ontario	Niagara County, New York, and Regional Municipality of Niagara	43°09′11″N 79°02′40″W
NY-553	Michigan Central Railway Bridge	Abandoned	Steel hinged arch	1925	1992	Canadian Pacific Railway (former)	Niagara River	Niagara Falls, New York, and Niagara Falls, Ontario	Niagara County, New York, and Regional Municipality of Niagara	43°06′31″N 79°03′30″W
NY-554	Goat Island Bridge	Extant	Stone arch	1960	1992	Pedestrian way	Niagara River	Niagara Falls	Niagara	43°04′57″N 79°04′00″W
NY-556	Tappan Zee Bridge	Replaced	Cantilever	1955	2015	I-87 / I-287 / New York Thruway	Hudson River	Tarrytown and South Nyack	Westchester and Rockland	41°04′12″N 73°53′28″W
PA-1	Delaware Aqueduct	Extant	Suspension	1847	1969	Delaware and Hudson Canal (former)	Delaware River	Minisink Ford, New York, and Lackawaxen, Pennsylvania	Sullivan County, New York, and Pike County, Pennsylvania	41°28′57″N 74°59′04″W
PA-23	Erie Railway, Delaware River Bridge	Extant	Pratt truss		1971	Central New York Railroad	Delaware River	Deerpark, New York, and Millrift, Pennsylvania	Orange County, New York, and Pike County, Pennsylvania	41°24′23″N 74°44′29″W
PA-470	Kellams Bridge	Extant	Suspension	1890	1997	Kellam Bridge Road	Delaware River	Hankins, New York, and Stalker, Pennsylvania	Sullivan County, New York, and Wayne County, Pennsylvania	41°49′24″N 75°06′49″W

== See also ==
- List of tunnels documented by the Historic American Engineering Record in New York
