= Starlight, Pennsylvania =

Unincorporated community in Pennsylvania, US

- Village
- Village of Starlight
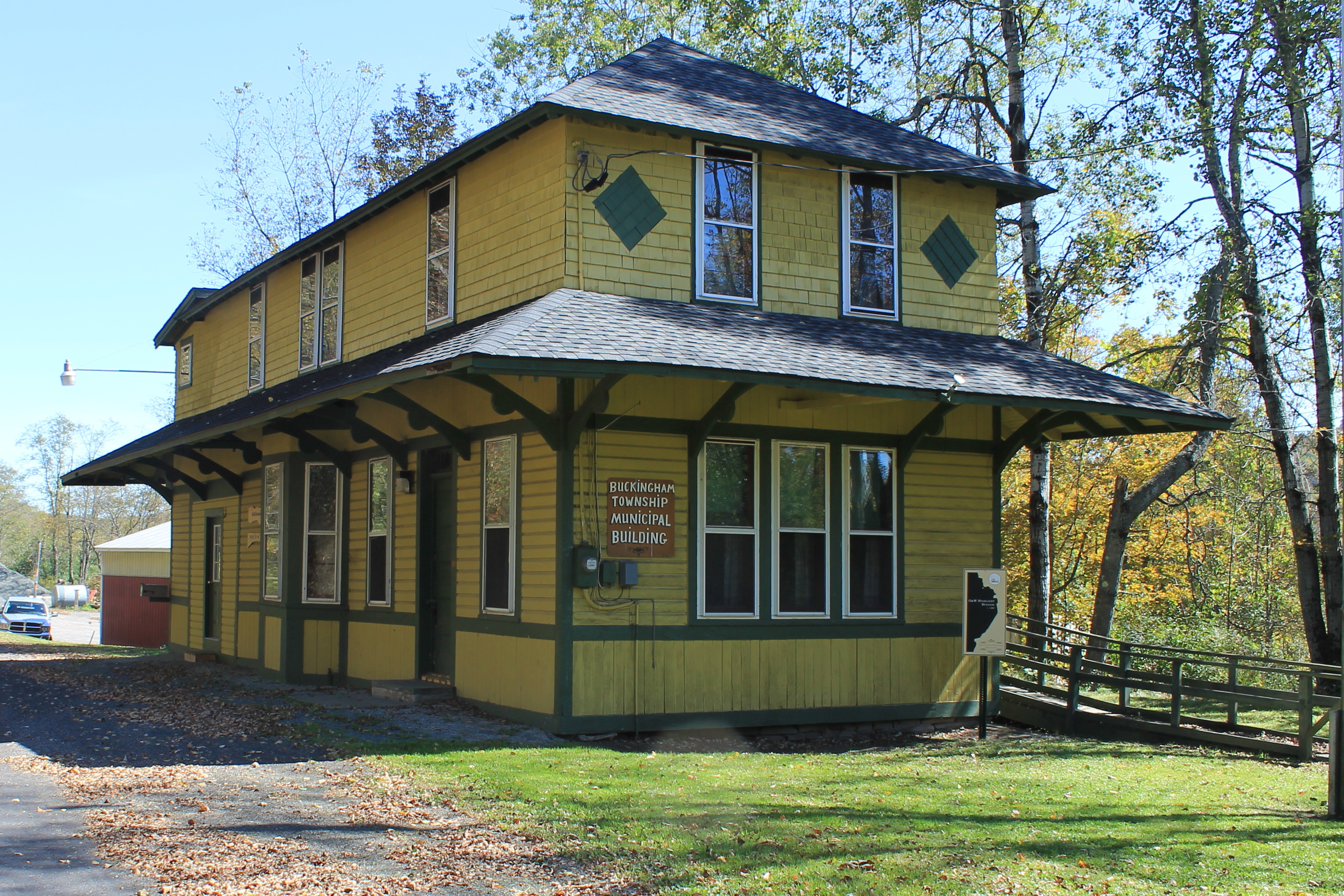
- The former Starlight Station in Starlight, which is now the Buckingham Township Municipal Building. It is also a U.S. National Historic Place.

- Starlight's Location within Pennsylvania.
- Coordinates: 41°54′18″N 75°19′52″W
- Country: United States
- State: Pennsylvania
- U.S. Congressional District: PA-10
- School District: Wayne Highlands; Region I
- County: Wayne
- Magisterial District: 22-3-04
- Township: Buckingham
- Named for: Starlight Lake
- Elevation: 1,352 ft (412 m)
- Time zone: UTC-5 (Eastern (EST))
  - Summer (DST): UTC-4 (Eastern Daylight (EDT))
- ZIP code: 18461
- Area code: 570
- GNIS feature ID: 1188417
- FIPS code: 42-127-09824-73744
- Waterways: Shehawken Creek, Starlight Lake

Starlight is a village that is located in Buckingham Township, Wayne County, Pennsylvania, United States. Crosstown Highway, which is entirely concurrent with Pennsylvania Route 370 (PA-370), is generally thought to be the southern edge of the village.

== History ==
This village was once a depot of the Scranton Division of the New York, Ontario & Western (O&W) Railway, but is largely known today for being home to the Inn at Starlight Lake & Restaurant, which has been open since 1909. Unfortunately the Inn burned down March 2025.

== Municipal status and boundaries ==
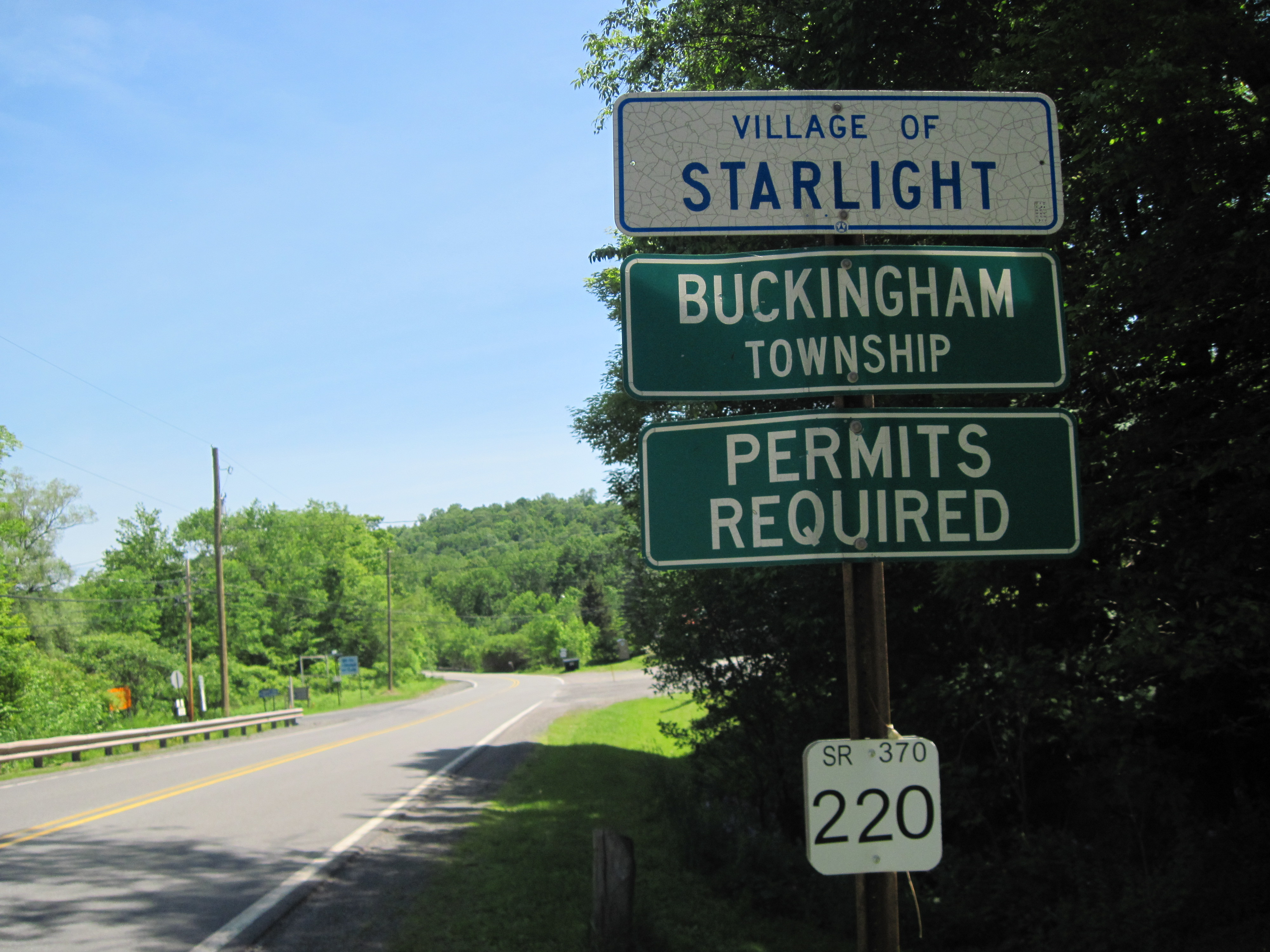
An image of Starlight's PennDOT sign, looking northeast along Crosstown Highway. The sign for Buckingham Township is also visible.

A Pennsylvania Department of Transportation (PennDOT) sign on Crosstown Highway identifies the community as the "Village of Starlight."

In Pennsylvania, a village is an unincorporated community within a township, but PennDOT identifies most villages with roadside signs, a fact that might reasonably lead those unfamiliar with this practice to believe that these communities are incorporated municipalities administered separately from the townships in which they are located. Since Pennsylvania's villages, including Starlight, are, in fact, not municipalities in their own right, they do not have official boundaries, and the United States Census Bureau does not collect statistics for them (unless, unlike Starlight, they are census-designated places). In spite of this, because of strong local consensus, as well as the fact that many features are named for the villages they are associated with, it is almost always impossible to consistently determine whether a particular feature is in one village or another.

== Natural features ==
Shehawken Creek (once called Chehocton Creek) and Starlight Lake are located in Starlight. The latter is the source of the former.
