= Equinunk =

Equinunk may refer to:

In Pennsylvania:

- Equinunk, Pennsylvania, a community in Wayne County
- Equinunk Creek, a tributary of the Delaware River
- Equinunk Historic District
- Camp Equinunk, in Honesdale
