= Buckingham Township, Pennsylvania =

Buckingham Township is the name of some places in the U.S. state of Pennsylvania:

- Buckingham Township, Bucks County, Pennsylvania
- Buckingham Township, Wayne County, Pennsylvania
