= Kellams Bridge =

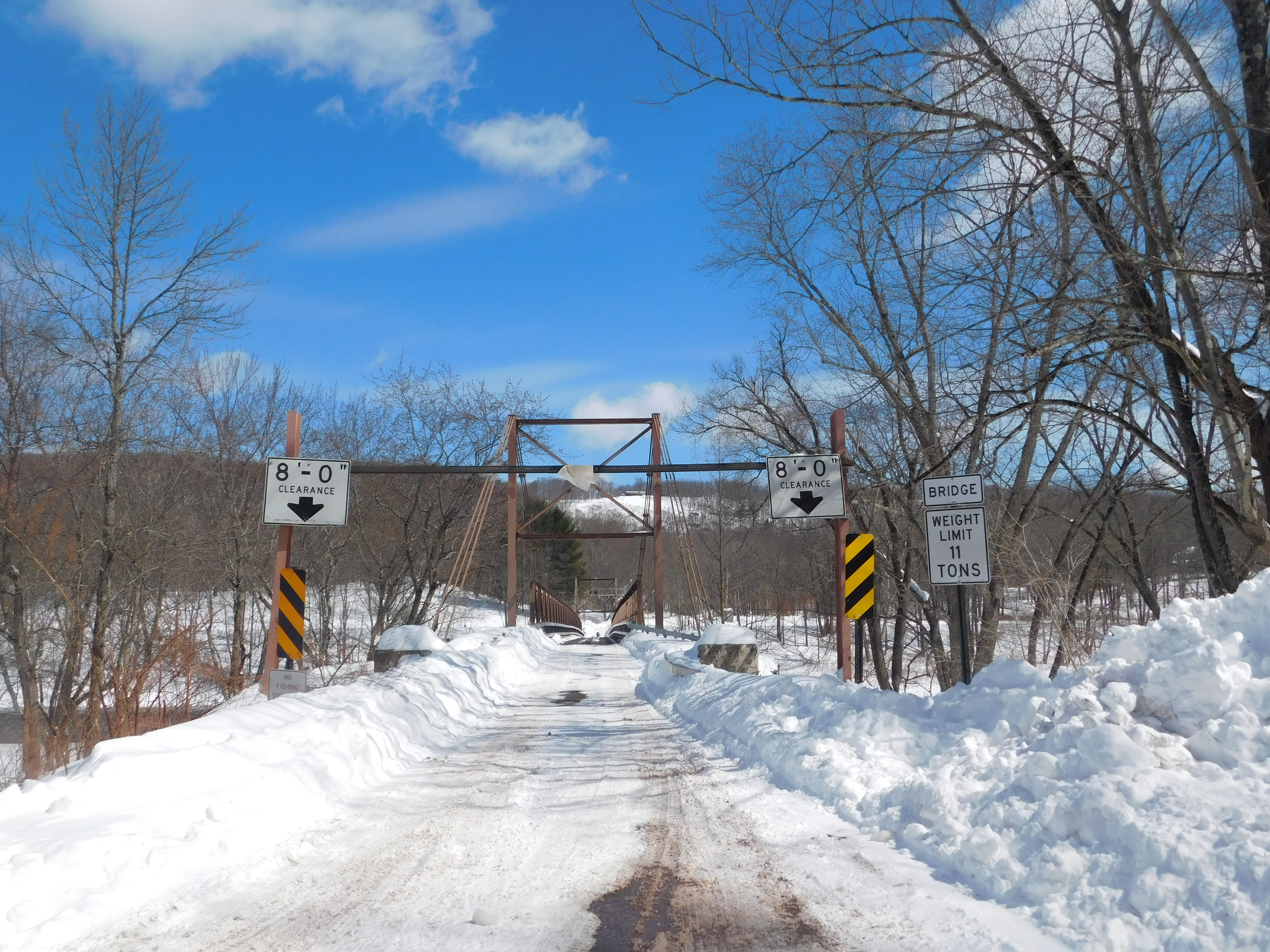
- Kellams Bridge in March 2017.
- Coordinates: 41°49′24″N 75°06′49″W
- Carries: 1 lane of Kellam Bridge Road
- Crosses: Delaware River
- Locale: Stalker, Pennsylvania, and Hankins, New York
- Official name: Kellams Bridge
- Other name: Little Equinunk Bridge
- Owner: New York–Pennsylvania Joint Interstate Bridge Commission
- Maintained by: New York–Pennsylvania Joint Interstate Bridge Commission

Characteristics
- Design: Underspanned suspension bridge
- Total length: 384 feet (117 m)
- No. of spans: 1
- Piers in water: 0
- Clearance above: 8 feet (2.4 m)

History
- Designer: David Kellam
- Construction end: 1889
- Opened: July 1889

Statistics
- Toll: 35¢ (until elimination of tolls in 1932)

Location
- Interactive map of Kellams Bridge

The Kellams Bridge, originally known as the Little Equinunk Bridge and officially the Kellams–Stalker Bridge is a 384-foot (117 m) underspanned suspension bridge across the Delaware River from Stalker village area of Manchester Township, Wayne County, Pennsylvania to Hankins hamlet in the town of Fremont, Sullivan County, New York. The single-lane steel grate deck bridge carries traffic of Kellam Bridge Road. The bridge is the only remaining underspan suspension bridge in the United States.

Replacing a ferry operated by William Kellam from 1860–1888, the Little Equinunk Bridge Company built a bridge in the location in 1889, constructed by Kellam's brother, David. The bridge operated as a private entity until 1932 when the New York–Pennsylvania Joint Interstate Bridge Commission purchased the bridge. The bridge was closed in 1935 after the structure began developing problems, resulting a local revolt, which left the bridge unofficially open until May 1936. In May 1936, a truck caused the bridge to sag and emergency repairs were required to bring the structure up to safety codes. The bridge closed in 1988 when the bridge's New York tower began tipping towards the Delaware River. Renovations were made on an emergency and permanent basis through July 1990.

== History ==
=== Establishment and private ownership (1888–1932) ===
The original crossing between the hamlet of Hankins in the town of Fremont, New York and the village of Stalker in Manchester Township, Pennsylvania was a ferry between the two locations operated by William Kellam starting March 1860.

The first meeting of a new bridge company came on April 30, 1888, with three members of the Kellam family, including William's brother David present, along with Joel Hill, a local landowner and veteran of the American Civil War, who would serve as the president of the Little Equinunk Bridge Company. At that meeting, the staff included a capitalization of $10,000 (1888 USD) that would involve 200 shares of $50 each. In July 1888, a second meeting was held and the company formed a committee for construction and building. However, the Pennsylvania General Assembly did not grant the company a state charter until April 1889.

By May 1889, $9,838 of the original $10,000 capitalization had reached the company and construction was underway by David Kellam. Kellam had a background in building bridges during the Civil War. He offered a bid $9,000 for construction of a new bridge, but construction would cost $9,341 in total. By July 1889, tolls for the new bridge were established and the last check was paid to Kellam for his construction for painting the new bridge. The bridge opened in July 1889 and by the end of calendar year, the bridge already made a profit for investors.

However, construction of the bridge did not originally come with a toll house, which would not be built until September 1891. This new toll house included a living quarters for the toll taker, who had to work without shelter for two years. The tolls upon establishment was 35¢ for a round trip, 25¢ for one way for a horse and carriage. A railroad dock for the Erie Railroad serviced the area and if someone crossing the bridge used the dock, the toll was 50¢. However, in September 1891, the company leaders found that David Kellam was stealing tolls from the company for personal use and the company dividends he would receive were held until the amount matched the money Kellam took. Kellam died in 1895 and buried near the bridge.

Kellam's Bridge was the site of an explosion on December 29, 1903, with an Erie Railroad locomotive (no. 1317) self-destructing near the bridge. The train, pulling a heavy freight, struggled to make steam and as it reached Kellam's Bridge, the engine stopped and exploded. The engineer and fireman were blown out of the engine, with both landing down the embankment. The engineer, Ira Wallace of Port Jervis, survived the explosion with injuries and burns, but the fireman, Frank Loven, also of Port Jervis, died after falling down the embankment. Another engine employee, William Kellam, also ended up going down the embankment into the river, with heavy burns from the firebox. A local resident, Mark Carr, also went down the embankment, landing in the river with burns and other injuries before rescuers grabbed him to safety. The head brakeman, Frank Boyle, was thrown 100 feet (30 m) in front of the exploded locomotive and only managed a sprained knee and lacerations. Boyle got up and helped assist the crew.

Discussion began in October 1927 between the Delaware River Joint Bridge Commission and the owners of Kellam's Bridge and the Lordville–Equinunk Bridge about eliminating the tolls on the bridges. A meeting was held in Honesdale, Pennsylvania between the commission, representatives of the bridge companies, and several Wayne County, Pennsylvania politicians. Progress was slow, and another meeting was held on December 14, 1928 in New York City by Lewis A. Hill and his brother John about getting the state to take over the bridge. However, by June 1930, the tolls were still not eliminated. The state had a deal by then to buy the bridge for $10,000. However, there were problems with that bridge and the nearby Roebling's Delaware Aqueduct in Highland in terms of getting titles. Local efforts made progress in eliminating the problems in acquisition of the title for Kellam's Bridge. At that agreement, the bridge would also have repairs done. Despite the agreement, the bridge still remained under private ownership into January 1932.

=== Free bridge (1932–present) ===
The final deal finished in 1932, at the total of $10,146 and tolls were eliminated on the bridge. The stockholders of the Little Equinunk Bridge Company were paid for their investment on the bridge.

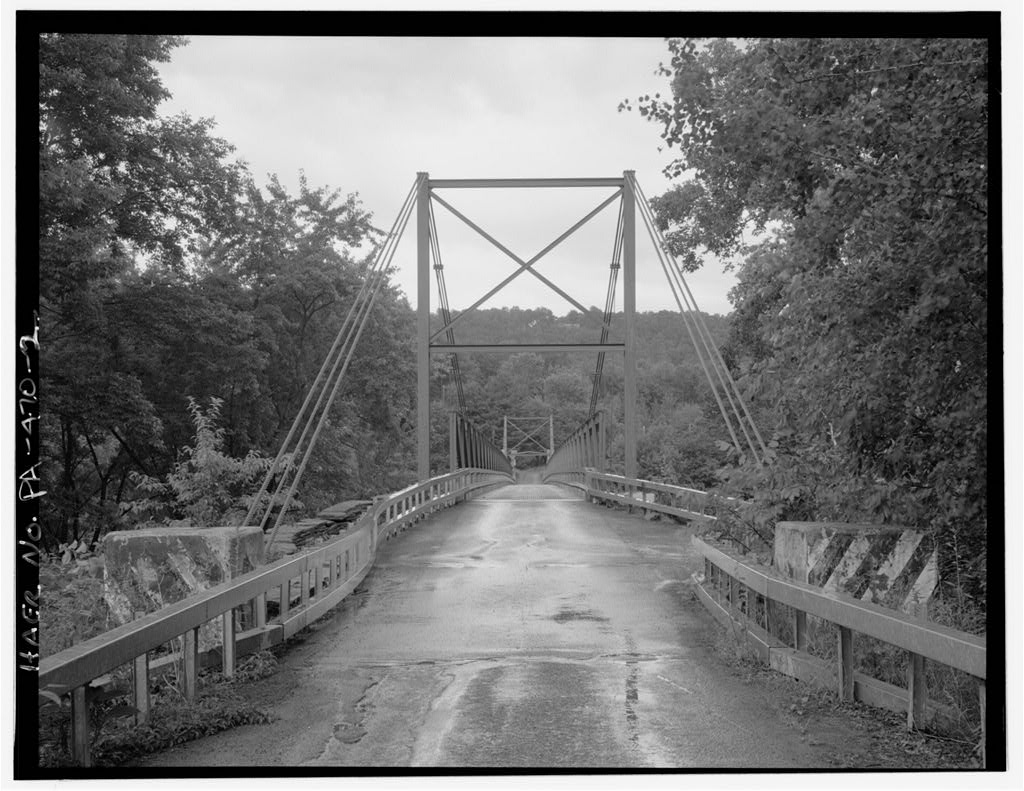
Kellams Bridge in 1997

In August 1935, officials closed the bridge, noting that was unsafe. There was local opposition from residents, farmers and merchants in Hankins, stating that the bridge's closure was hurting their local business. The Sullivan County Board of Supervisors made an argument in favor of the locals and the bridge opened again in October 1935. However, officials re-ordered the bridge closed. Irritated locals went to the bridge and pulled the barriers down, resulting in unofficial access.

However, in May 1936, a vehicle with stone in it crossing the bridge caused the structure to sag towards the river. Officials closed the bridge off again with bars and engineers from the state inspected the span. As part of this inspection, a piece of the suspension cables were cut from the bridge with the intent to determine if the suspension cables could be repaired or would have to be replaced entirely. With necessary construction coming, the states of New York and Pennsylvania agreed to split the cost for restoration work on Kellam's Bridge in July 1936. The whole project would cost around $40,000 and that bids would be opened on August 7, 1936. The Pennsylvania Department of Hgihways announced on August 26 that a contract for the work on the Kellam Bridge was given to the Pittsburgh Des Moines Steel Company out of Pittsburgh, Pennsylvania. This contract, totaling $33,407, would include repairing the steel cable of the bridge. The 1936 bridge work included replacement of the cables and replacing the deck, which went from wood to steel grating.

Officials from the Pennsylvania Department of Transportation (PennDOT) and New York State Department of Transportation (NYSDOT) closed the bridge in June 1988, when a concrete support for the tower on the New York side began to weaken, causing the tower to tip. Officials found the failure from drilling into the concrete and using a measuring device in the span of a month. An engineer from PennDOT stated that plans were in the works for restoration of the bridge already and that project would include stabilizing the moving tower, along with painting and repairs on the steel grate deck. One resident reported to PennDOT that a truck with heavy objects inside crossed the bridge several years prior, which did damage to the deck and side-rails of the structure. The destruction necessitated installation of overhead bars to prevent larger vehicles from crossing the bridge. Their effort would result in the bridge having a new 16-ton weight limit instead of the current 3-ton capacity. At the time the expectation was the bridge would be closed until December 1988.

However, locals were concerned about the length of time involved in the project. After getting 500 signatures on a local petition, residents told the Wayne County Commissioners that their livelihoods were being affected by the closed bridge and problems were occurring for emergency services in the area. Their efforts got PennDOT to move up the contract let date from August 25, 1988 to August 4 to help move up the timeline of the project. However, PennDOT stated that because NYSDOT is doing the repair work on an emergency basis, the states would need to do multiple agreements before construction could begin. The contract ended up for $311,811 would involve the construction of a retaining wall around the New York abutment and extra towers would be built to help support the bridge. This contract would be only be a temporary repair, with a permanent project to occur in the spring of 1989. This project would keep the bridge at its current 3-ton limit and that outside of the truss problems, the bridge was in good shape. The expectation was the bridge would re-open in November 1988. The bridge re-opened on December 21, 1988.

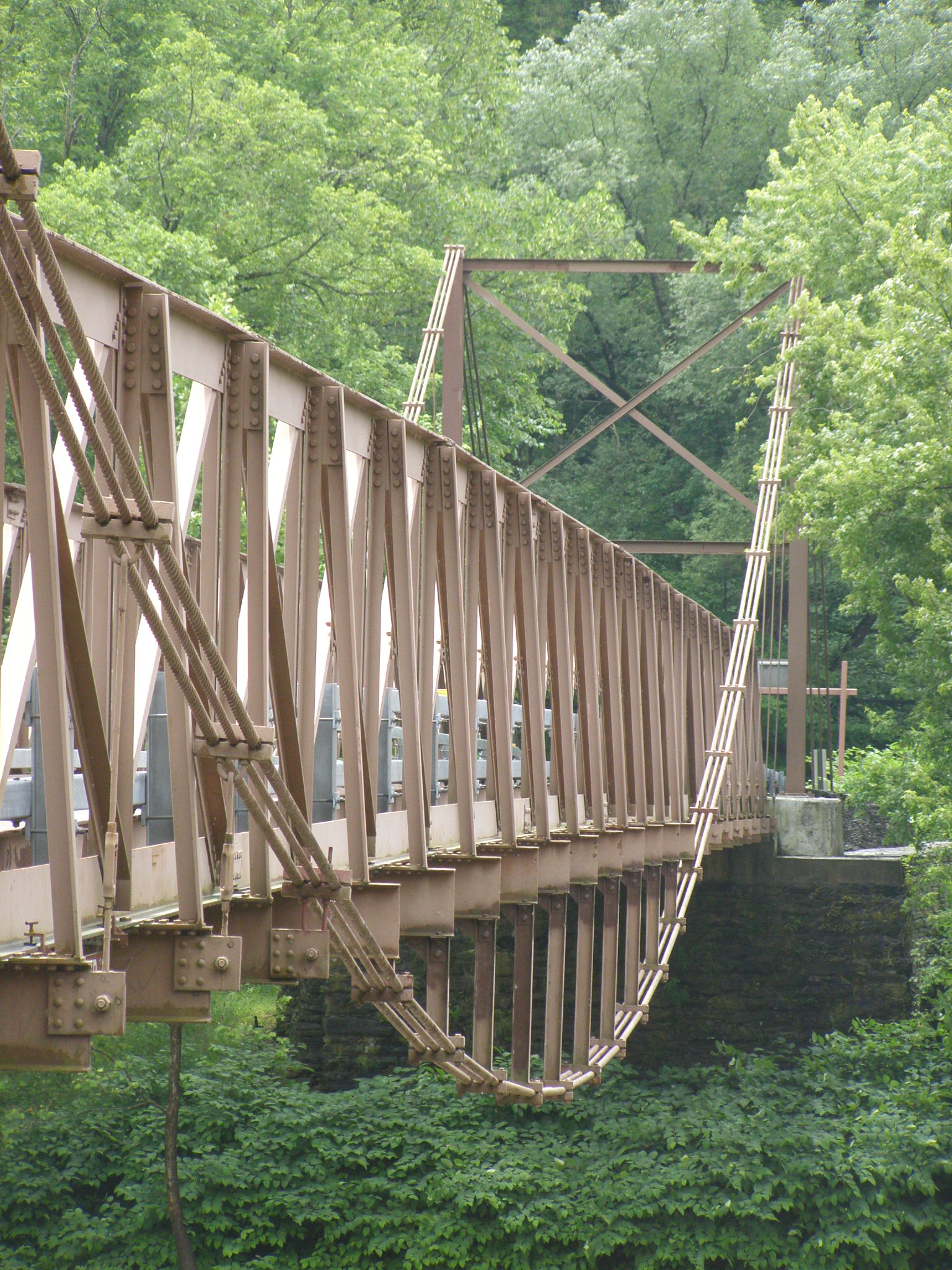
The underspan of the bridge in June 2011

In May 1989, NYSDOT officials announced that a $1.2 million contract would be let on June 1, 1989 for the permanent repairs on the Kellam Bridge. This project would include that the towers would be straightened from their tipped position and that the truss would be strengthened to help withstand larger vehicles. This would include the bridge being closed until December 1989, when work would be suspended due to the winter season and resume in 1990. As part of construction, the bridge would be declared a "restricted highway" through June 30, 1990 to help permit the project on the Kellam Bridge. In May 1990, NYSDOT engineers confirmed that the bridge would be opened again in June 1990 with the repairs finished and the new clearance bars installed. The bridge would then be set to the planned 16-ton weight capacity. A second contract would also result in inspection of the bridge upon completion. The bridge re-opened in July 1990.

A flood in June 2006 caused damage to the bridge. The flooding resulted in the suspension cables being damaged by debris. This damage, found in a July 21 inspection, found the bridge's northern cables were rotated 15°, making the trusses weaker. While no damage was found to the abutments or towers of the bridge, NYSDOT closed the bridge and announced that a repair plan would be made in the upcoming winter after further structural analysis. Construction began on October 3, 2006 after NYSDOT came up with their own repairs and rather than put the project out to bid, engineers and bridge crew from Region 9 worked on the bridge themselves. Ten days after construction began, the repaired bridge re-opened on October 13.

Through 2018, NYSDOT and PennDOT worked on rehabilitation of the bridge, replacing the bridge deck from 1936 and replacing the bridge's support beams. The bridge was also painted along with other repairs made. The project was done in off-peak tourist times to prevent inconveniencing locals. The $2.7 million project was finished in November 2018 and expected to lengthen the life of the bridge.

== See also ==
- List of bridges documented by the Historic American Engineering Record in New York (state)
- List of bridges documented by the Historic American Engineering Record in Pennsylvania
- List of crossings of the Delaware River
- New York–Pennsylvania Joint Interstate Bridge Commission

== Bibliography ==
- Dale, Frank T. (2003). Bridges Over The Delaware River: A History of Crossings. Piscataway, New Jersey: Rutgers University Press. ISBN 978-0-8135-3213-4.
