= Underspanned suspension bridge =

- Micklewood Bridge as illustrated by Charles Drewry, 1832
- Ancestor: Simple suspension bridge
- Carries: Pedestrians, livestock
- Span range: short
- Movable: No
- Design effort: low
- Falsework required: No

An underspanned suspension bridge (also upper deck suspension bridge) is a rare type of suspension bridge that was developed in the early 19th century.

== Overview ==
It differs from its ancestor, the simple suspension bridge, in that the deck is raised on posts above the main cables. The raised deck is less stable than a deck laid on or hung below the cables, and very few underspanned suspension bridges have been built. Examples include Guillaume Henri Dufour's Pont des Bergues (1834); and James Smith’s Micklewood Bridge. Similar bridges were proposed by Robert Stevenson in 1820 for a bridge over the River Almond between Edinburgh and Queensferry, and by a Mr. Armstrong for a bridge at Clifton. Part of the roadway on the land side of the piers of the Hammersmith Bridge was constructed in this manner. In the late 19th century and into the 20th century a few bridges of this type were constructed.

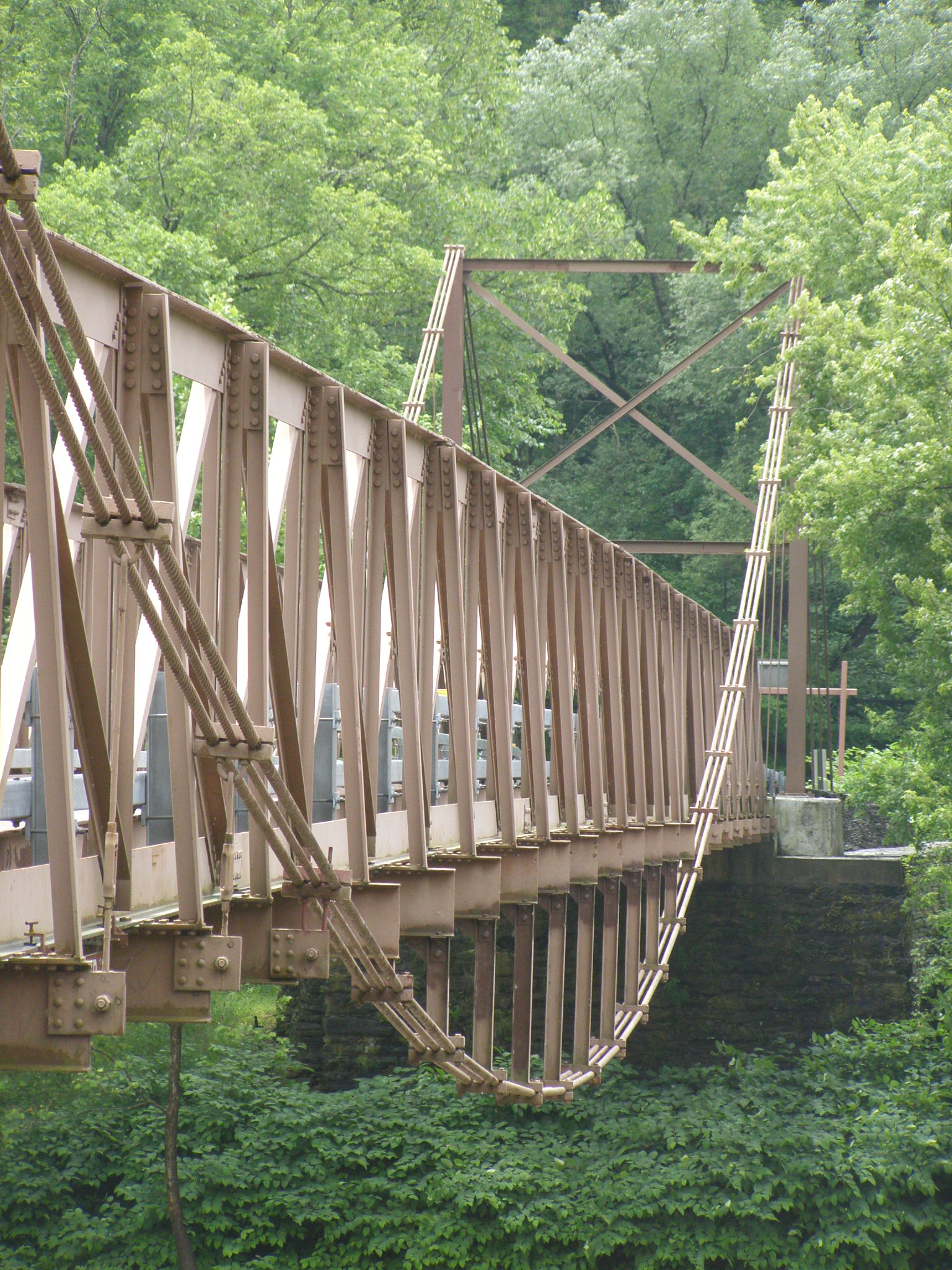
Kellams Bridge

The Micklewood Bridge, constructed at Doune in Scotland, was the very first of this type. It had a span of 103 feet (31 m), and the main cables were chains, making this an instance of a chain bridge. The deck was stiff and relatively stable, owing to heavy cross-braces.

The only remaining underspanned suspension bridge in the United States is the Kellams Bridge crossing the upper Delaware River between New York and Pennsylvania. It is named for its builder.
