= Main Street Bridge (Rochester, New York) =

- U.S. National Register of Historic Places
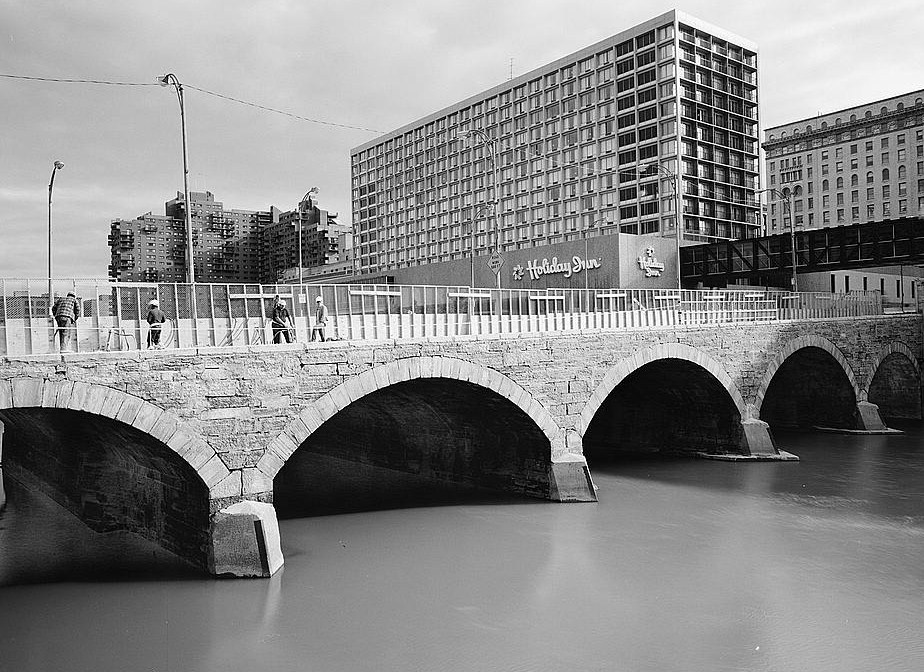
- Main Street Bridge in 1987

- Location within New York Location within the United States
- Location: Main Street at Genesee River, Rochester, New York
- Coordinates: 43°9′22″N 77°36′39″W
- Area: less than one acre
- Built: 1857
- Architect: multiple
- MPS: Stone Arch Bridge TR
- NRHP reference No.: 84000303
- Added to NRHP: October 11, 1984

Main Street Bridge is a historic stone arch bridge located at Rochester in Monroe County, New York. It was constructed in 1857 and spans the Genesee River. It has five segmental arches with spans of 30 to 42 feet (9.1 to 12.8 m) and rises of 8–11.5 feet (2.4–3.5 m).

== History ==
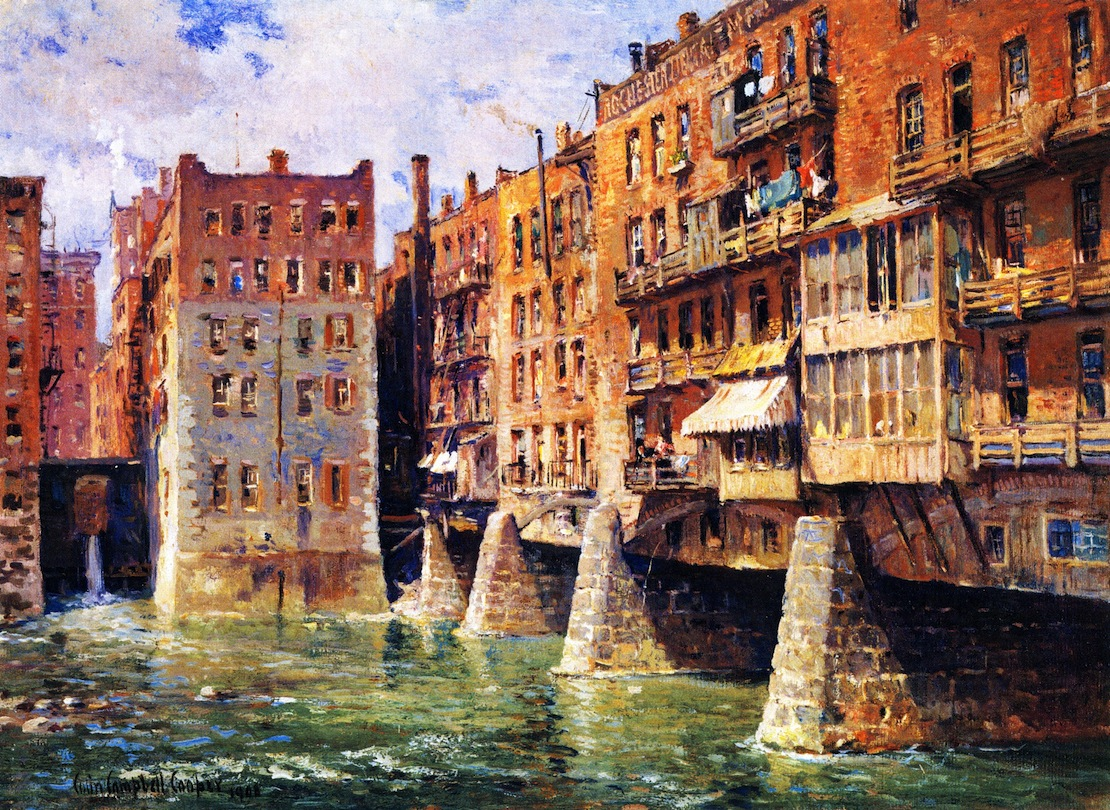
The bridge as it was in 1908, painted by Colin Campbell Cooper

=== Previous structures ===
The first bridge on this position, constructed on wooden piers, was built in 1810–12. The roadway was level with the east bank, meaning that the bridge had to be reached via a ramp from the lower west bank. This bridge was replaced in 1824. Over the first few years of the second bridge's existence, buildings began to be constructed along the bridge, a situation legally permitted due to fact that the river is not navigable at this point. In 1827 a market was constructed on the north side, its west end resting on the Front Street wall and its east end supported by the westernmost pier of the bridge. An early directory described it as consisting of

an open platform, adjoining the bridge, of 20 feet, designed for a vegetable market; next, a raised platform, in a range with and corresponding to the sidewalks of Buffalo and Main-streets, of which the market will serve as a continuation. Next to this, is the covered meat market, having in the center a walk of 12 feet wide, between two rows of turned columns, and on either side, the places for stalls, each 10 by 14 feet.

By 1830 almost the whole north side of the bridge was occupied by buildings. Those resting entirely on the bridge were made of wood, but there was a four-story structure called the Globe Building at the east end, resting only partly on the bridge. Housing small manufacturing workshops, it had waterwheels housed beneath it. The south side of the bridge remained open. The wooden buildings were destroyed by fire in January 1834. They were, except for the market, soon rebuilt, but a flood in October of the next year removed them again. The flood damage also made the rebuilding of the bridge desirable, and a new structure was begun in 1837. Plans for a stone bridge were dropped, but two stone piers were built and the eastern abutment was raised to lessen the gradient up Main Street hill. The bridge was completed by September, 1838, and its north side was soon occupied by one- and two-storey wooden buildings housing shops, mostly selling clothing or dry goods.

=== Present structure ===
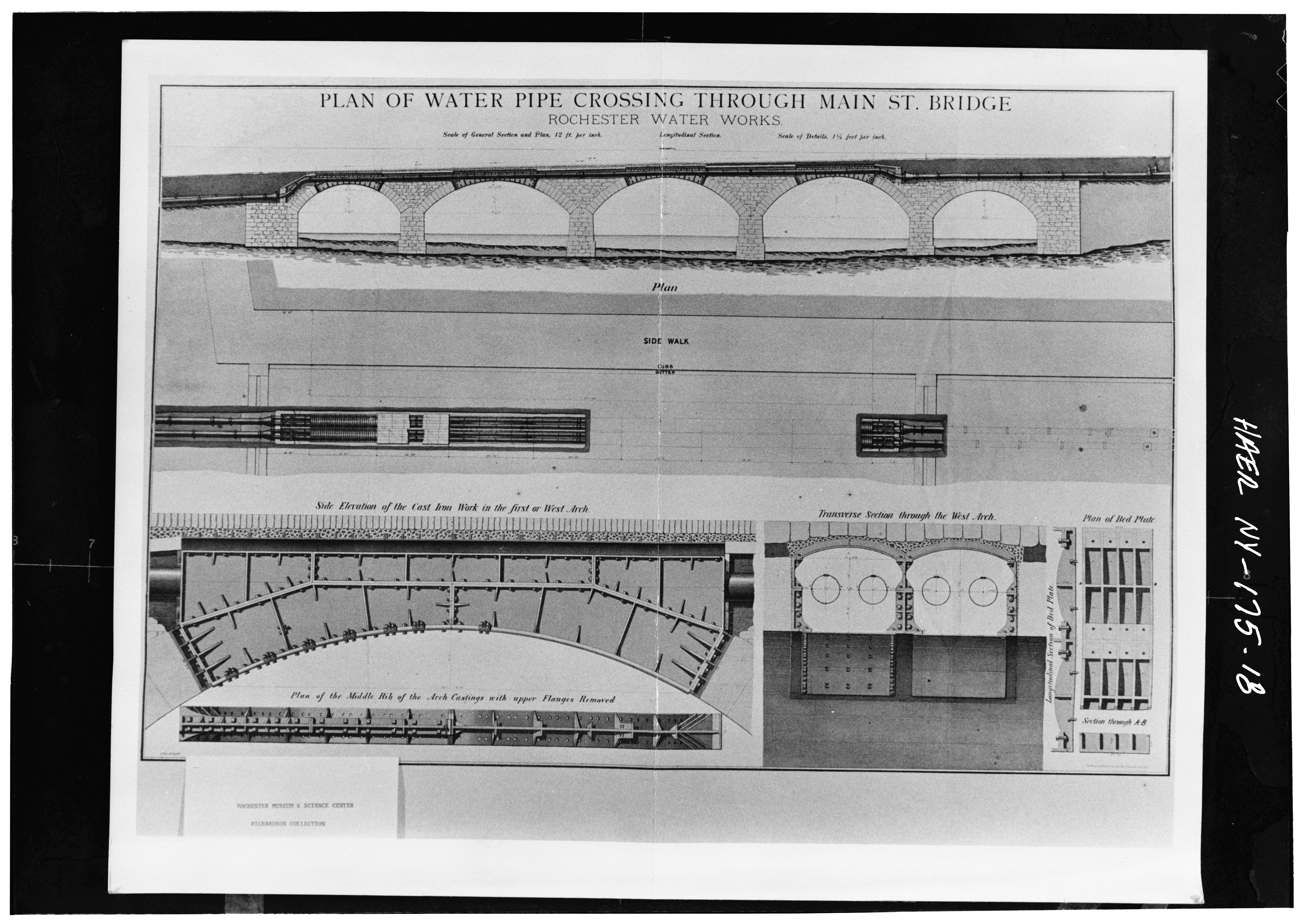
BRIDGE PLAN for 60's redesign

Work on the present stone structure began in September 1855, and it was opened in August 1857, although a considerable amount of work remained to be done. Construction of shops on the north side began almost immediately, this time in stone rather than wood, and supported on extensions to the bridge piers and river walls. The bridge was widened on the south side in 1861–2, and buildings started to be constructed on the south side in 1865. The buildings were removed in the mid-1960s.

The bridge was listed on the National Register of Historic Places in 1984.

== See also ==
- National Register of Historic Places listings in Rochester, New York
- List of bridges documented by the Historic American Engineering Record in New York (state)
