= Equinunk Historic District =

Historic district in Pennsylvania, United States

- U.S. National Register of Historic Places
- U.S. Historic district
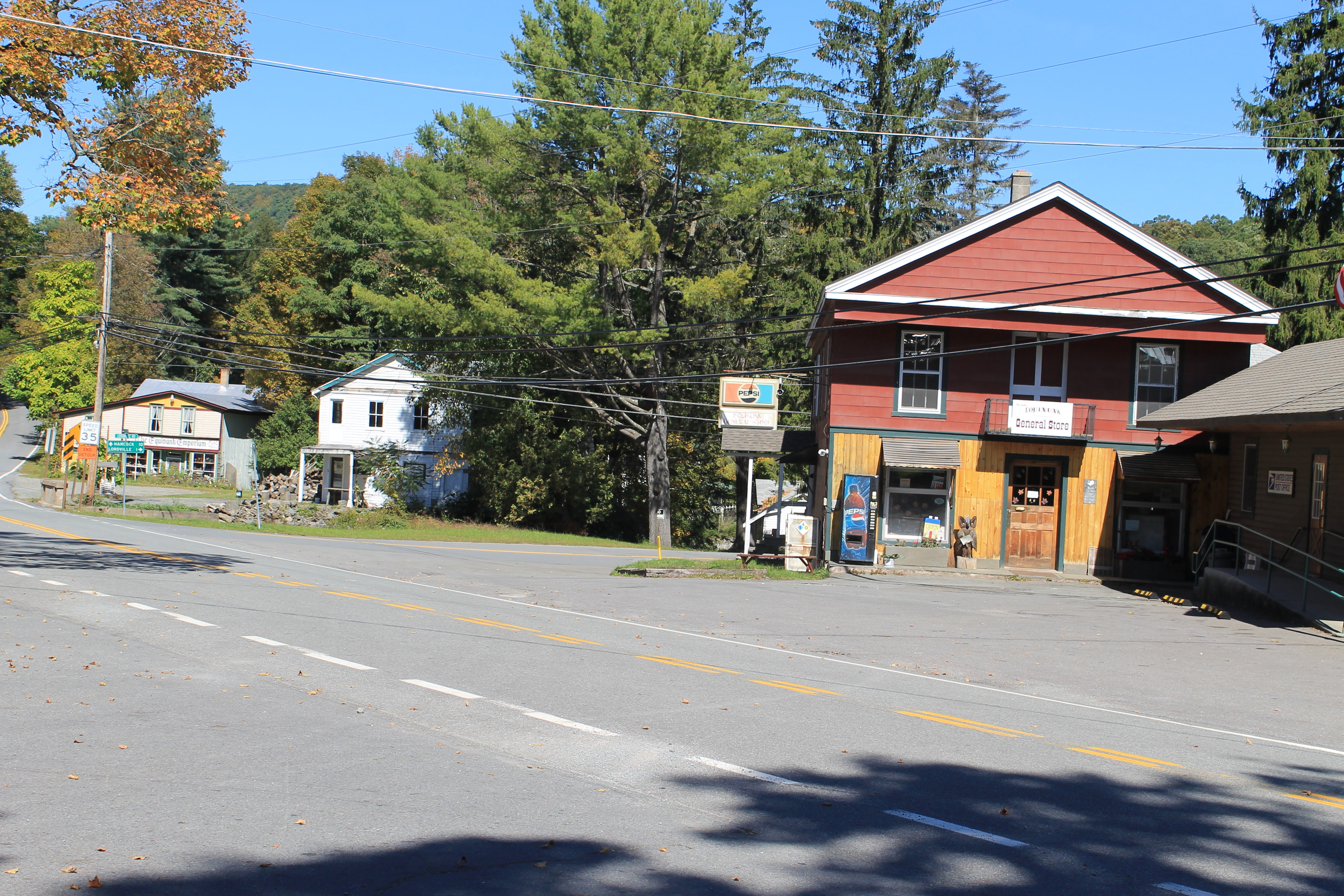

- Location within Pennsylvania Location within the United States
- Location: Generally following SR191, Pine Mill, Lordville, and Grocery Hill Rds., Buckingham Township and Manchester Township, Pennsylvania
- Coordinates: 41°51′18″N 75°13′37″W
- Area: 50 acres (20 ha)
- Built by: Lloyd Brothers
- Architectural style: Mid 19th Century Revival, Late Victorian
- MPS: Upper Delaware Valley, New York and Pennsylvania MPS
- NRHP reference No.: 99001336
- Added to NRHP: November 12, 1999

Equinunk Historic District is a national historic district located at Buckingham Township and Manchester Township, Wayne County, Pennsylvania. The district includes 55 contributing buildings and 1 contributing site in the community of Equinunk. The buildings are vernacular interpretations of a variety of popular 19th- and early-20th-century architectural styles including Greek Revival, Italianate, Gothic Revival, Second Empire, and Queen Anne. Notable buildings include Nelson's Store (c. 1850), Calder House (c. 1836), Nelson House (c. 1875), Barnes House (1901), Bullock's Store (c. 1888), Taft Hotel (c. 1870), Bleck's Hotel (1905), and Equinunk Methodist Church (1895). The contributing site is the Equinunk Cemetery.

It was added to the National Register of Historic Places in 1999.
