= Starlight station =

- Starlight Station, New York, Ontario, and Western Railway
- U.S. National Register of Historic Places
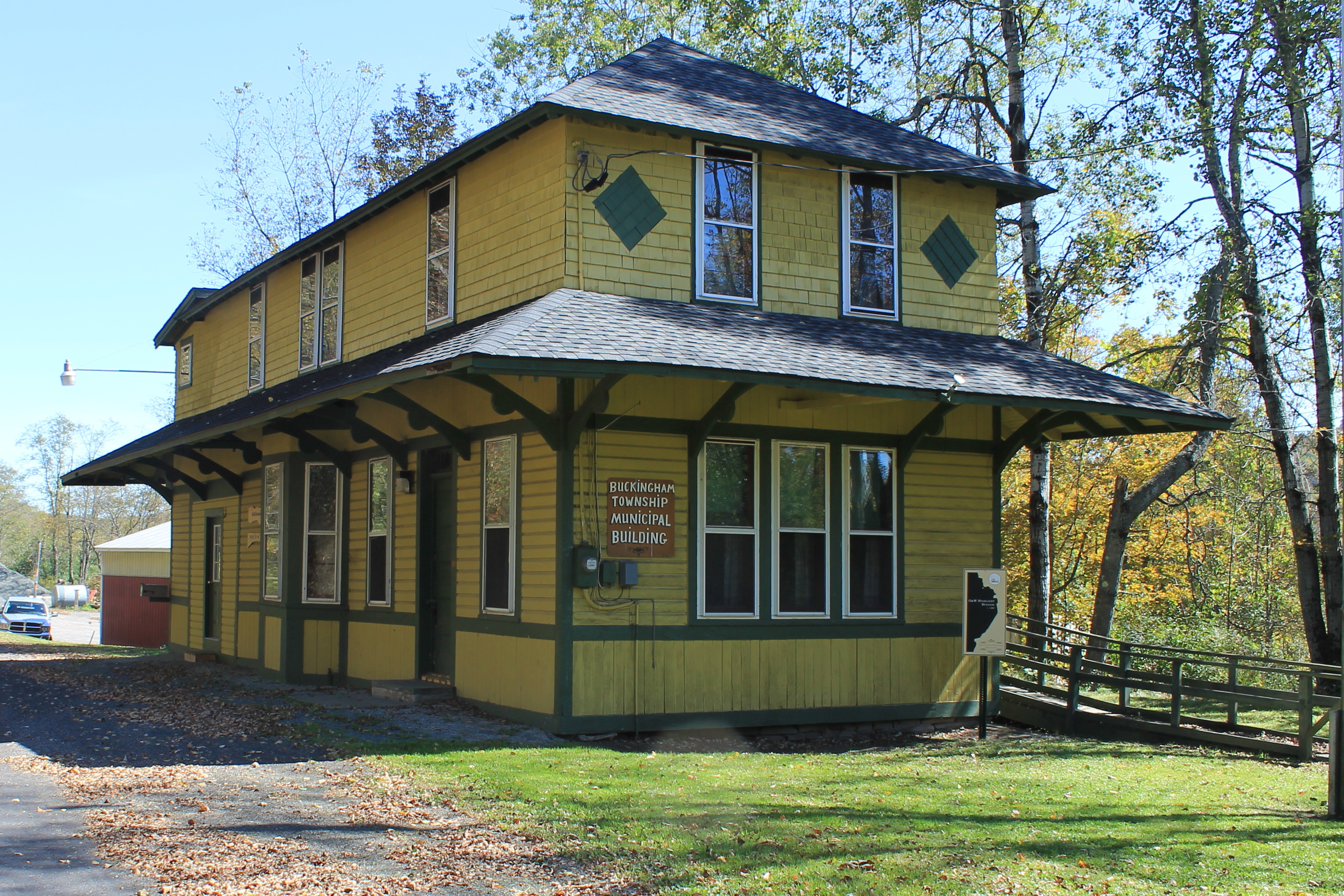

- Location within Pennsylvania Location within the United States
- Location: O & W Rd. NE of Depot Hill Rd, Starlight, Buckingham Township, Pennsylvania
- Coordinates: 41°54′14″N 75°19′46″W
- Area: 3.2 acres (1.3 ha)
- Built: 1889
- Architect: Dietrich and Company
- Architectural style: Late Victorian
- NRHP reference No.: 01000925
- Added to NRHP: August 30, 2001

The Starlight Station, New York, Ontario, and Western Railway, also known as the Buckingham Township Municipal Building, is an historic railway station in Buckingham Township, Wayne County, Pennsylvania, United States.

It was added to the National Register of Historic Places in 2001.

== History and architectural features ==
Built in 1889 as the New York, Ontario and Western Railway(O&W) was organizing its new Scranton division, this railroad station became the social and economic center of the community during its heyday. The surrounding area, which had been known as Lizard Lake prior to the railroad's arrival, was officially named "Starlight" after the village's first post office was established at the station. That new name was chosen by local residents from a book provided by the U.S. Postal Service. The station agent's wife was the village's first postmaster.

Customers came in to send off letters and pick up their mail. The station agent logged in freight dairy products, produce, and other items, ensuring that they were properly transferred from the freight room to the appropriate railroad cars, oversaw the offloading of supplies for local customers, and sold tickets to village residents, vacationers and salesmen using the railroad for business travel.

The building was in use as a passenger and freight station, as well as the station agent's residence, until 1933, when the Great Depression led to local business failures and the financial losses for the O&W. The station agent office was subsequently moved to nearby Lakewood station. Although no longer in use as an office, Starlight station was maintained as a railroad property, providing living quarters for the agent. The post office remained at the station until 1953, when the family moved out of the upstairs apartment and the post office was relocated. In 1957, with all its divisions closed down, the O&W was dissolved and Starlight station sat empty and unused.

In 1968, Buckingham Township, in need of a municipal building, purchased the station building, but did not immediately have the funds to convert it for government purposes. In 1976, it received grant money to renovate the building, adapting it for use as a township office and meeting space. The freight room floor was removed to lower the surface to ground level and the exterior freight door was replaced with an overhead door converting the space for use as a garage. A portion of the former stationmaster’s office was partitioned to create a restroom.

In 2000, the municipality researched the station's original exterior paint color, and then restored the station by repainting it in its distinctive original mustard yellow with dark green trim.

=== Present day ===
Comparison with early photographs of the building reveals that the building's basic design footprint and mass remain unaltered. Most original materials and distinctive details remain, including the stationmaster's ticket cage, wood floors and complex siding. Despite changes made in the name of adaptive reuse, inside and out, the overall appearance retains its architectural integrity.

The former waiting room has been used as a space for township meetings. The former post office area is now the township office. The former freight room is a garage that houses township equipment.

Preceding station	New York, Ontario and Western Railway	Following station
Poyntelle toward Scranton	Scranton – Cadosia	Cadosia Terminus
