= Buckingham Township, Wayne County, Pennsylvania =

Township in Pennsylvania, US

Buckingham, Pennsylvania
- Second-class township
- Township of Buckingham
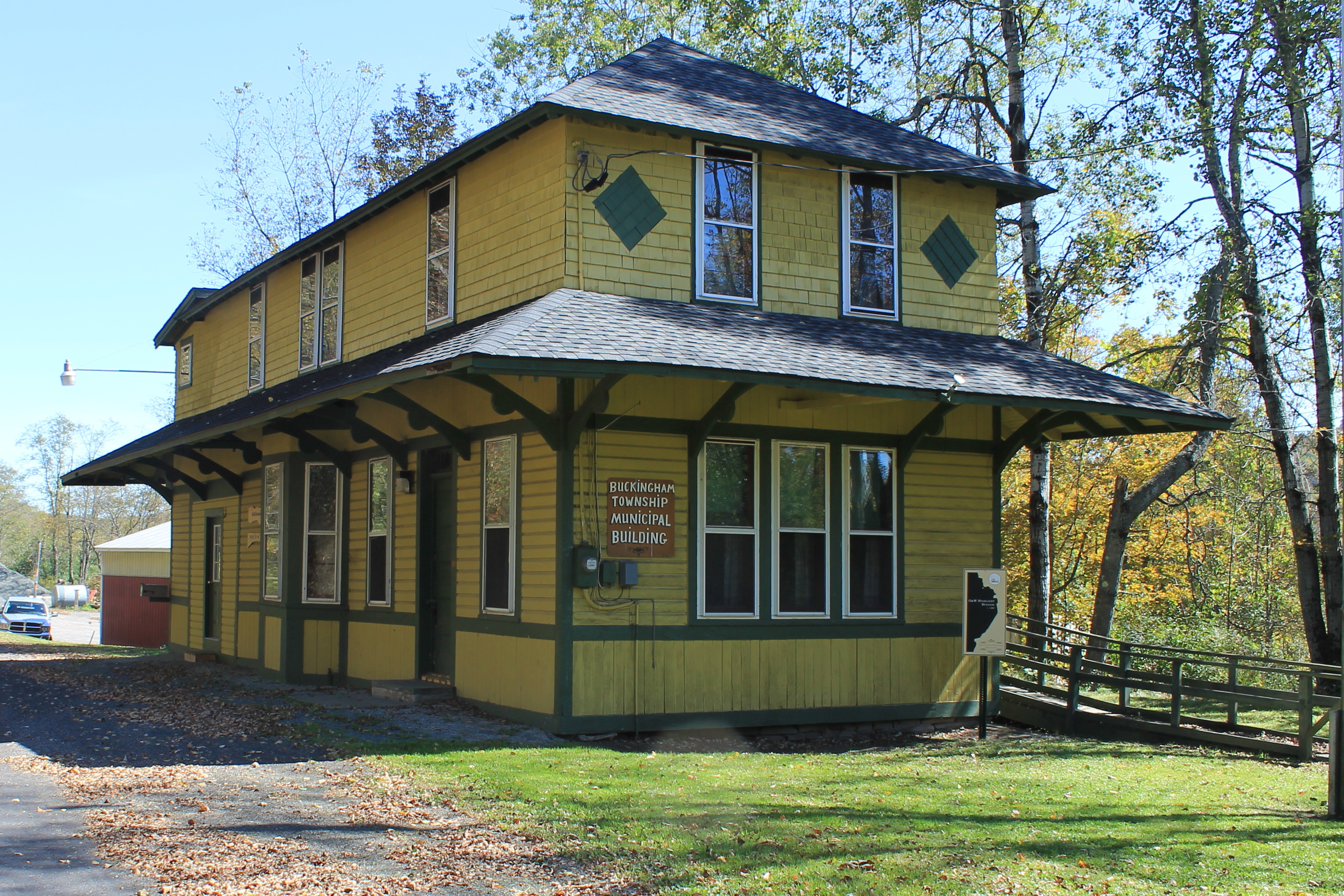
- The former Starlight Station in Starlight, which is now the Buckingham Township Municipal Building. It is also a U.S. National Historic Place.

- Location in Wayne County and the state of Pennsylvania.
- Country: United States
- State: Pennsylvania
- US Congressional District: PA-8
- State Senatorial District: 20
- State House of Representatives District: 111
- County: Wayne
- School District: Wayne Highlands; Region I
- Settled: c. 1789
- Incorporated: March 21, 1798 (original township of Wayne County)
- Founded by: Samuel Preston, Sr.
- Named after: Buckingham Township (Bucks County)

Government
  - Type: Board of Supervisors
  - Board of Supervisors: Supervisors: Kurt Mueller; Bradley Shaffer; James R. Mullican
  - US Representative: Matt Cartwright (D)
  - State Senator: Lisa Baker (R)
  - State Representative: Sandra Major (R)

Area
  - Total: 45.40 sq mi (117.59 km^{2})
  - Land: 44.23 sq mi (114.56 km^{2})
  - Water: 1.17 sq mi (3.03 km^{2})
- Elevation: 1,043 ft (317.9 m)

Population (2020)
  - Total: 506
  - Density: 11.4/sq mi (4.42/km^{2})
- Time zone: UTC-5 (Eastern (EST))
  - Summer (DST): UTC-4 (Eastern Daylight (EDT))
- Area code: 570
- GNIS feature ID: 1217248
- FIPS code: 42-127-09824

Buckingham is a second-class township in Wayne County, Pennsylvania, United States. The township's population was 506 at the time of the 2020 United States Census.

== History ==
The Equinunk Historic District and Starlight Station, New York, Ontario, and Western Railway are listed on the National Register of Historic Places.

== Geography ==
According to the United States Census Bureau, the township has a total area of 45.4 square miles (118 km^{2}), of which 44.2 square miles (114 km^{2}) is land and 1.2 square miles (3.1 km^{2}) (2.58%) is water.

== Communities ==
The following villages are located in Buckingham Township:

- Autumn Leaves
- Balls Eddy (also in Scott Township)
- Dillontown
- Equinunk (also in Manchester Township)
- High Lake (also called Brownsville)
- Lake Como (also in Preston Township)
- Starlight
- Stockport

== Demographics ==
Historical population
Census	Pop.	Note	%±
2010	520		—
2020	506		−2.7%
U.S. Decennial Census

As of the census of 2010, there were 520 people, 260 households, and 148 families residing in the township. The population density was 11.8 inhabitants per square mile (4.6/km^{2}). There were 523 housing units at an average density of 11.8 per square mile (4.6/km^{2}). The racial makeup of the township was 97.7% White, 0.2% African American, 0.6% Asian, 0.5% from other races, 1% from two or more races. Hispanic or Latino of any race were 2.5% of the population.

There were 260 households, out of which 13.8% had children under the age of 18 living with them, 44.2% were married couples living together, 6.5% had a female householder with no husband present, and 43.1% were non-families. 35% of all households were made up of individuals, and 18.1% had someone living alone who was 65 years of age or older. The average household size was 2.00 and the average family size was 2.53.

In the township the population was spread out, with 13.1% under the age of 18, 60.9% from 18 to 64, and 26% who were 65 years of age or older. The median age was 53.3 years.

The median income for a household in the township was $40,268, and the median income for a family was $54,375. Males had a median income of $36,193 versus $30,000 for females. The per capita income for the township was $26,796. About 9.9% of families and 11.4% of the population were below the poverty line, including none of those under age 18 and 18.6% of those age 65 or over.

== Images ==
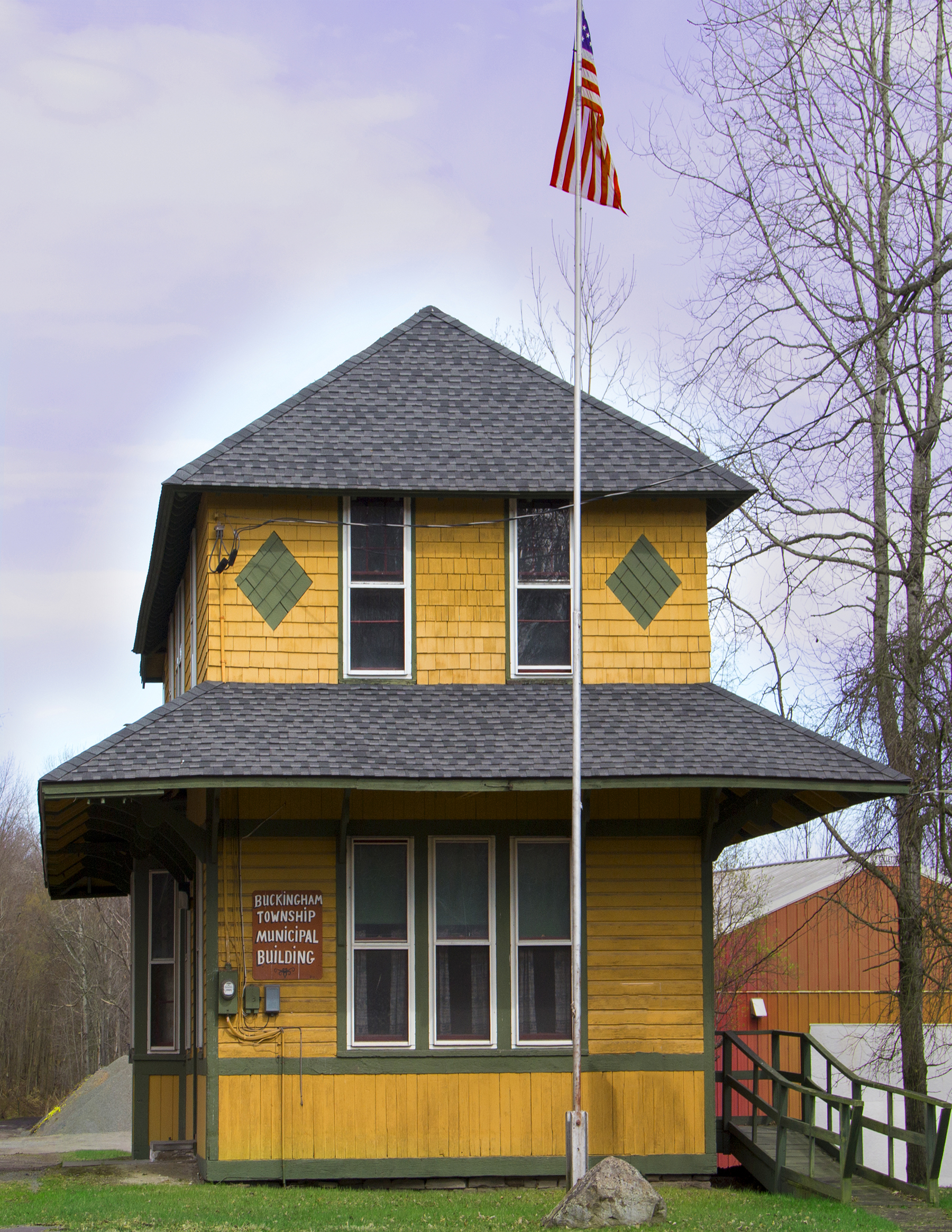
Town Hall in Buckingham Township, PA (early spring 2012)
