= Long Creek (New York) =

Coordinates: 40°36′48″N 73°34′31″W

Long Creek is a salt-water channel running roughly north from South Oyster Bay toward Freeport, New York.

== Crossings ==
It is spanned by the Long Creek Bridge.

== Gallery ==
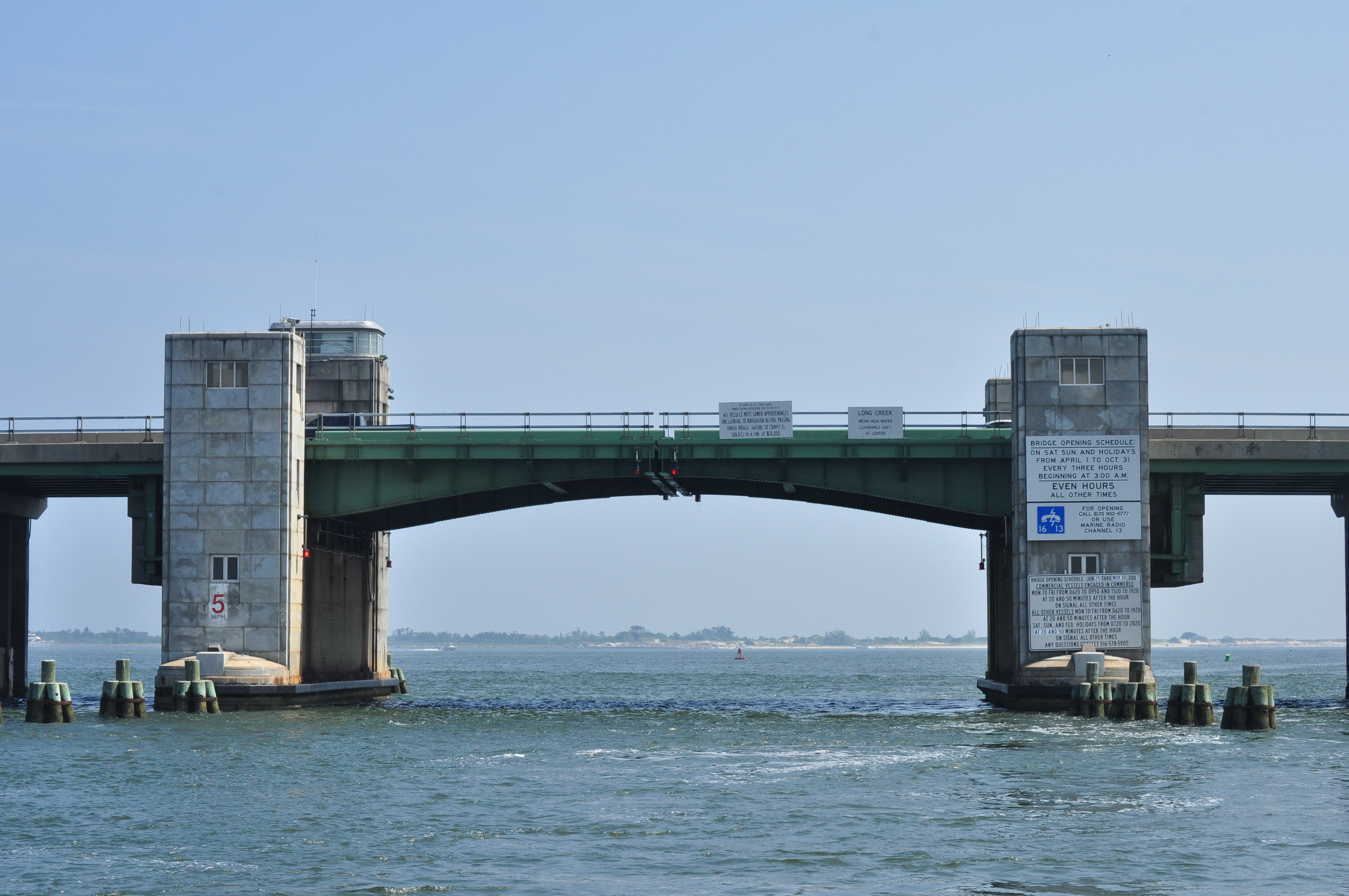
Long Creek Bridge

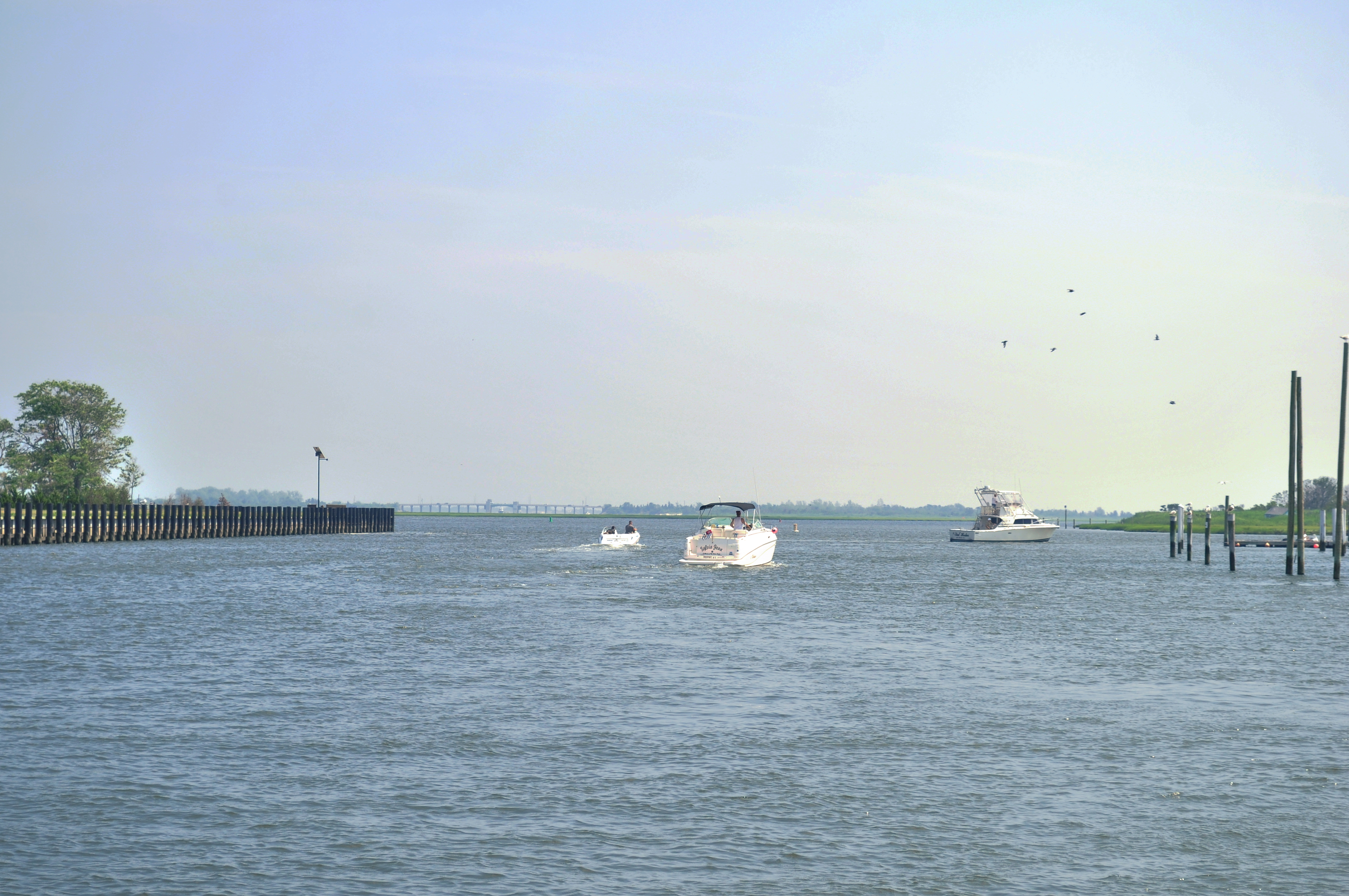
Looking toward Long Creek from Freeport's Woodcleft Canal

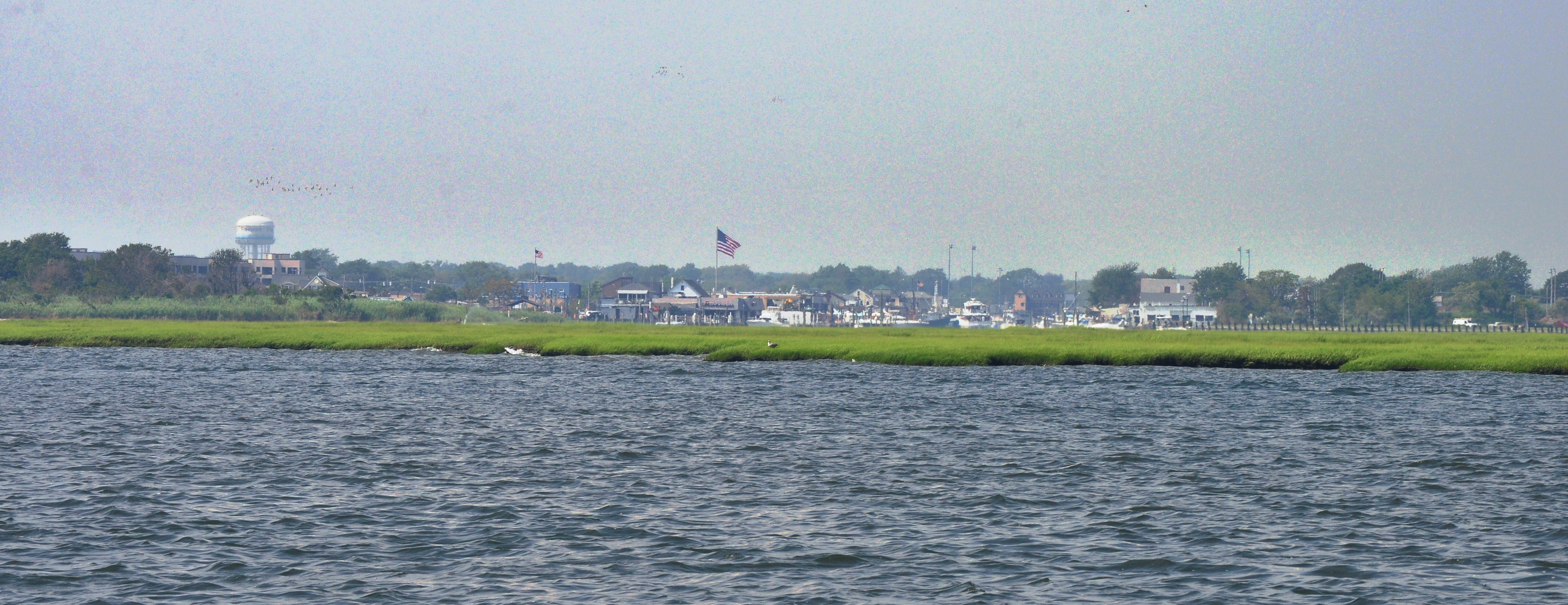
Looking toward Freeport's "Nautical Mile" along Woodcleft Canal from Long Creek
