= Quantuck Bay =

Bay in Suffolk County, New York, US

Coordinates: 40.808°N 72.622°W

- Location within New York

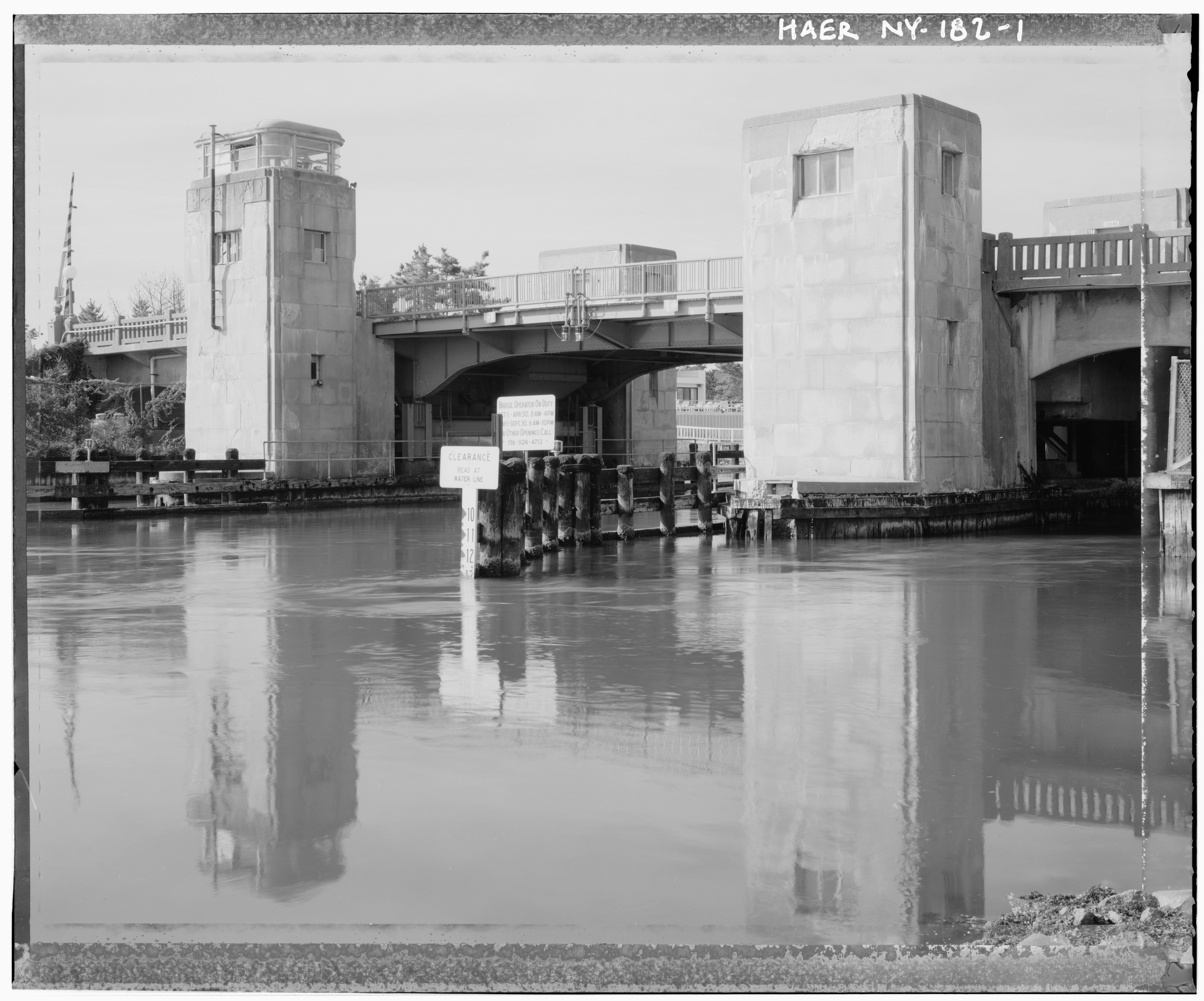
Quantuck Canal Bridge on the West side of the bay

Quantuck Bay is off Long Island, Suffolk County New York bordering Quogue and the Quogue Wildlife Refuge.
