= Manchester Township, Wayne County, Pennsylvania =

Township in Pennsylvania, US

Manchester Township
- Township
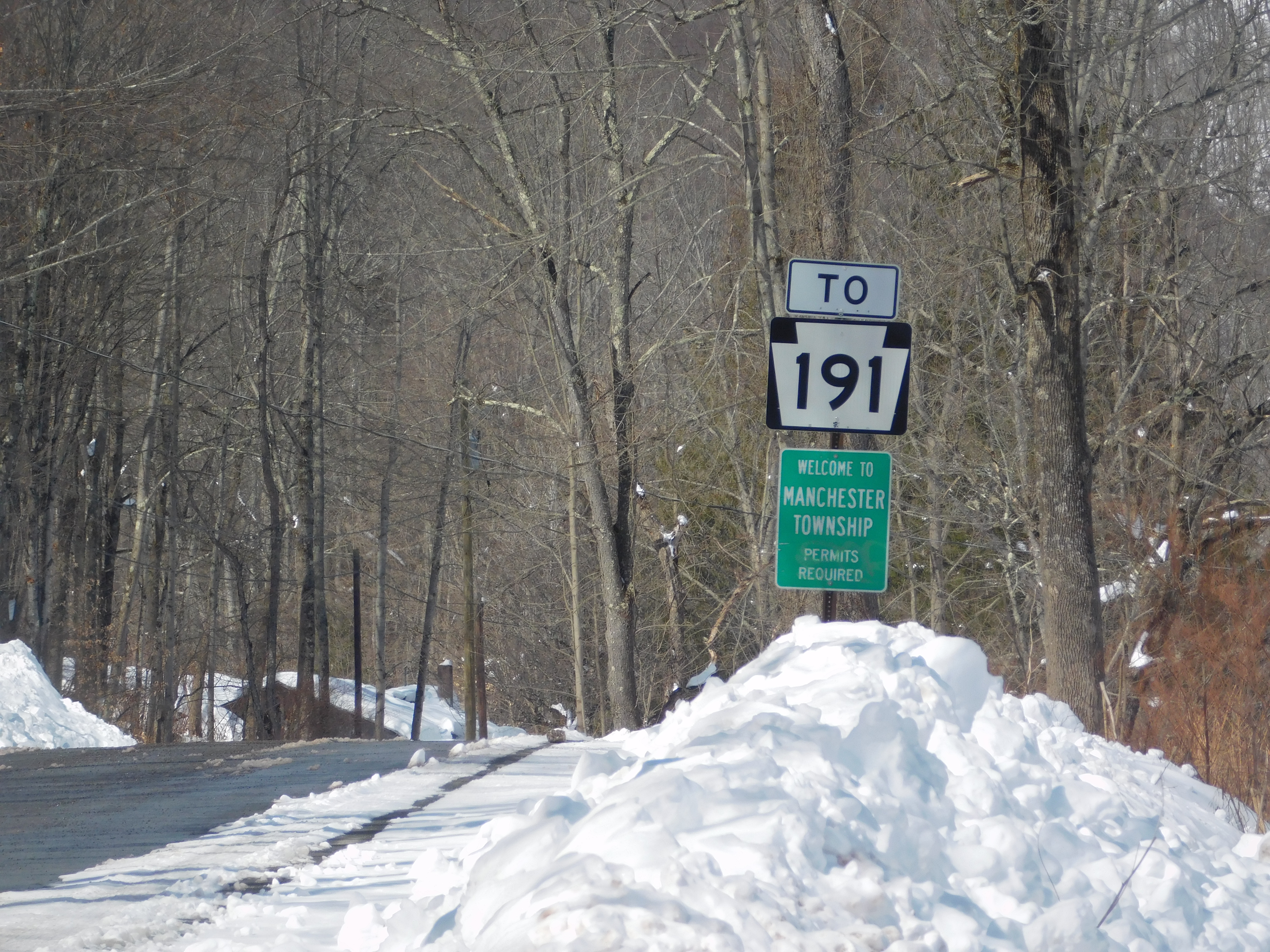
- Signage off the Little Equinunk Bridge for Manchester Township and Route 191.

- Location in Wayne County and the state of Pennsylvania.

- Location of Pennsylvania in the United States
- Coordinates: 41°48′00″N 75°06′59″W
- Country: United States
- State: Pennsylvania
- County: Wayne

Area
  - Total: 45.01 sq mi (116.57 km^{2})
  - Land: 44.12 sq mi (114.27 km^{2})
  - Water: 0.89 sq mi (2.30 km^{2})
- Elevation: 1,437 ft (438 m)

Population (2010)
  - Total: 836
  - Estimate (2016): 800
  - Density: 18/sq mi (7/km^{2})
- Time zone: UTC-5 (EST)
  - Summer (DST): UTC-4 (EDT)
- Area code: 570
- FIPS code: 42-127-46856

Manchester is a second-class township in Wayne County, Pennsylvania, United States. The township's population was 836 at the time of the 2010 United States Census.

== History ==
The Equinunk Historic District was listed on the National Register of Historic Places in 1999.

== Geography ==
According to the United States Census Bureau, the township has a total area of 45.0 square miles (116.4 km^{2}), of which 44.1 square miles (114 km^{2}) is land and 0.9 square miles (2.0 km^{2}) (2%) is water.

== Demographics ==
Historical population
Census	Pop.	Note	%±
2010	836		—
2016 (est.)	800		−4.3%
U.S. Decennial Census

As of the census of 2010, there were 836 people, 359 households, and 243 families residing in the township. The population density was 19 inhabitants per square mile (7.3/km^{2}). There were 686 housing units at an average density of 15.5 per square mile (6.0/km^{2}). The racial makeup of the township was 98% White, 0.6% African American, 0.1% Asian, and 1.3% from two or more races. Hispanic or Latino of any race were 1% of the population.

There were 359 households, out of which 20.6% had children under the age of 18 living with them, 56% were married couples living together, 6.7% had a female householder with no husband present, and 32.3% were non-families. 27.6% of all households were made up of individuals, and 14.5% had someone living alone who was 65 years of age or older. The average household size was 2.33 and the average family size was 2.81.

In the township the population was spread out, with 18.9% under the age of 18, 59.4% from 18 to 64, and 21.7% who were 65 years of age or older. The median age was 48 years.

The median income for a household in the township was $35,873, and the median income for a family was $43,333. Males had a median income of $34,464 versus $28,750 for females. The per capita income for the township was $22,126. About 9.9% of families and 18.6% of the population were below the poverty line, including 30.2% of those under age 18 and 13.6% of those age 65 or over.
