= Hankins, New York =

- Hamlet and CDP
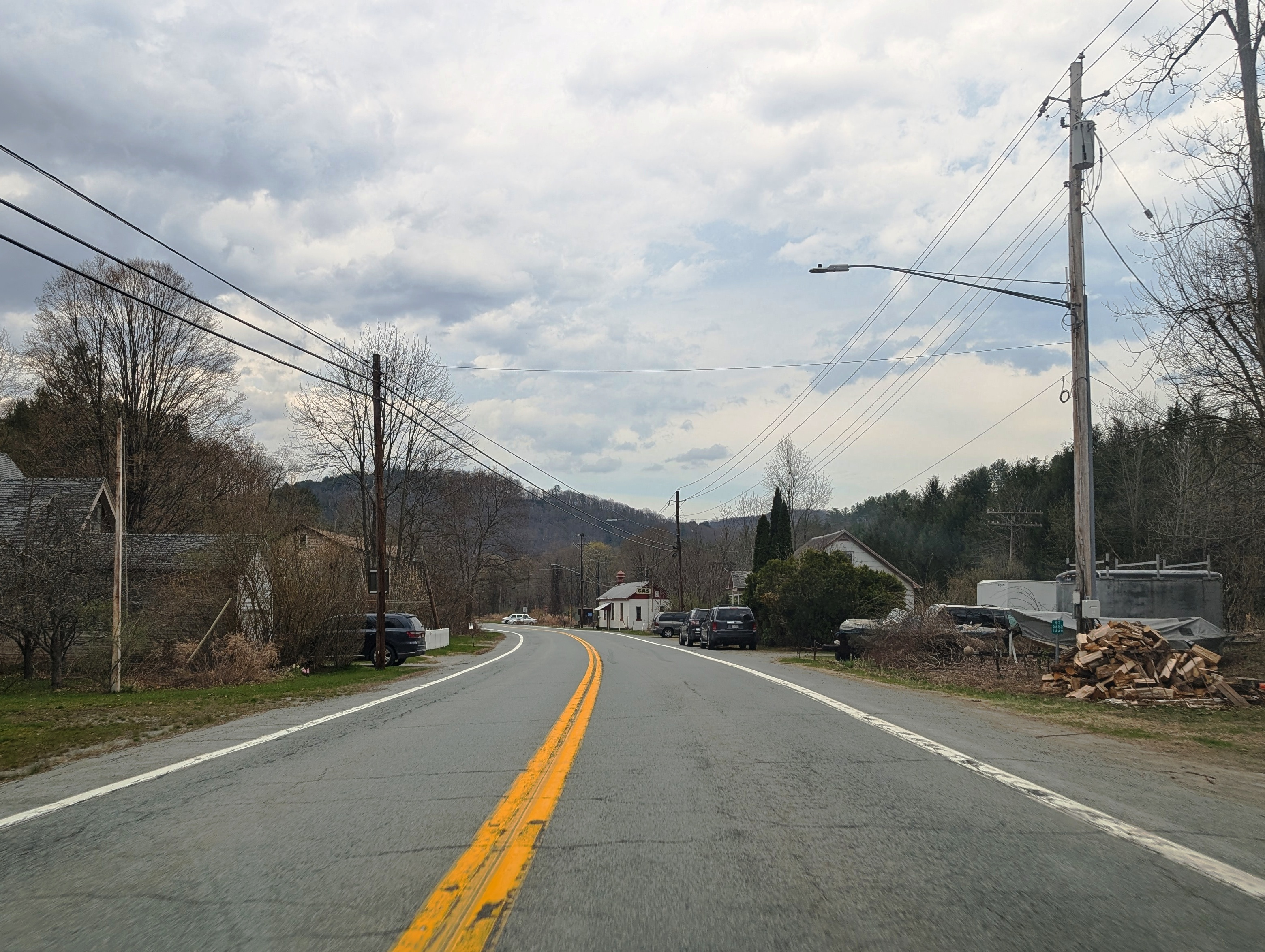
- NY 97 southbound through Hankins

- Location within New York Location within the United States
- Coordinates: 41°48′51″N 75°05′13″W
- Country: United States
- State: New York
- County: Sullivan

Area
  - Total: 1.39 sq mi (3.61 km^{2})
  - Land: 1.37 sq mi (3.56 km^{2})
  - Water: 0.019 sq mi (0.05 km^{2})
- Elevation: 807 ft (246 m)
- Time zone: UTC-5 (Eastern (EST))
  - Summer (DST): UTC-4 (EDT)
- ZIP code: 12741
- Area code: 845
- GNIS feature ID: 952165

Hankins is a hamlet (and census-designated place) in the town of Fremont, Sullivan County, New York, United States. As of the 2020 census, Hankins had a population of 129. The community is located along New York State Route 97 and the Delaware River, 8.2 miles (13.2 km) west-northwest of Jeffersonville. Hankins has a post office with ZIP code 12741.
