= Pennsylvania Route 107 =

State highway in Pennsylvania, US

Pennsylvania Route 107

Route information
- Maintained by PennDOT
- Length: 17.271 mi (27.795 km)

Major junctions
- West end: US 6 / US 11 in Factoryville
- PA 407 in Benton Township; I-81 in Benton Township; PA 247 in Scott Township; US 6 Bus. in Mayfield
- East end: US 6 in Mayfield

Location
- Country: United States
- State: Pennsylvania
- Counties: Wyoming, Lackawanna

Highway system
- Pennsylvania State Route System; Interstate; US; State; Scenic; Legislative
← PA 106	→ PA 108

Pennsylvania Route 107 (PA 107) is a 17.3-mile-long (27.8 km) state highway located in Wyoming and Lackawanna counties in Pennsylvania. The western terminus is at U.S. Route 6 (US 6)/US 11 in Factoryville. The eastern terminus is at an interchange with the US 6 freeway in Jermyn. The length of this route serves as a shortcut for through traffic on US 6 creating a bypass of Scranton and Clarks Summit. PA 107 is a two-lane undivided road that runs through mostly rural areas in the northern part of Lackawanna County. The route intersects PA 407 in Fleetville, Interstate 81 (I-81) in Benton Township, PA 247 in Scott Township, and US 6 Business (US 6 Bus.) in Mayfield. PA 107 was designated in 1928 between US 11 in Factoryville and US 6 at Washington Avenue in Jermyn. The entire route was paved in the 1930s. The eastern terminus was cut back to US 6 at Scranton-Carbondale Highway (present US 6 Bus.) in the 1940s. PA 107 was extended back to unnumbered Washington Avenue in the 1970s and along a new road to the US 6 freeway in 1995.

== Route description ==
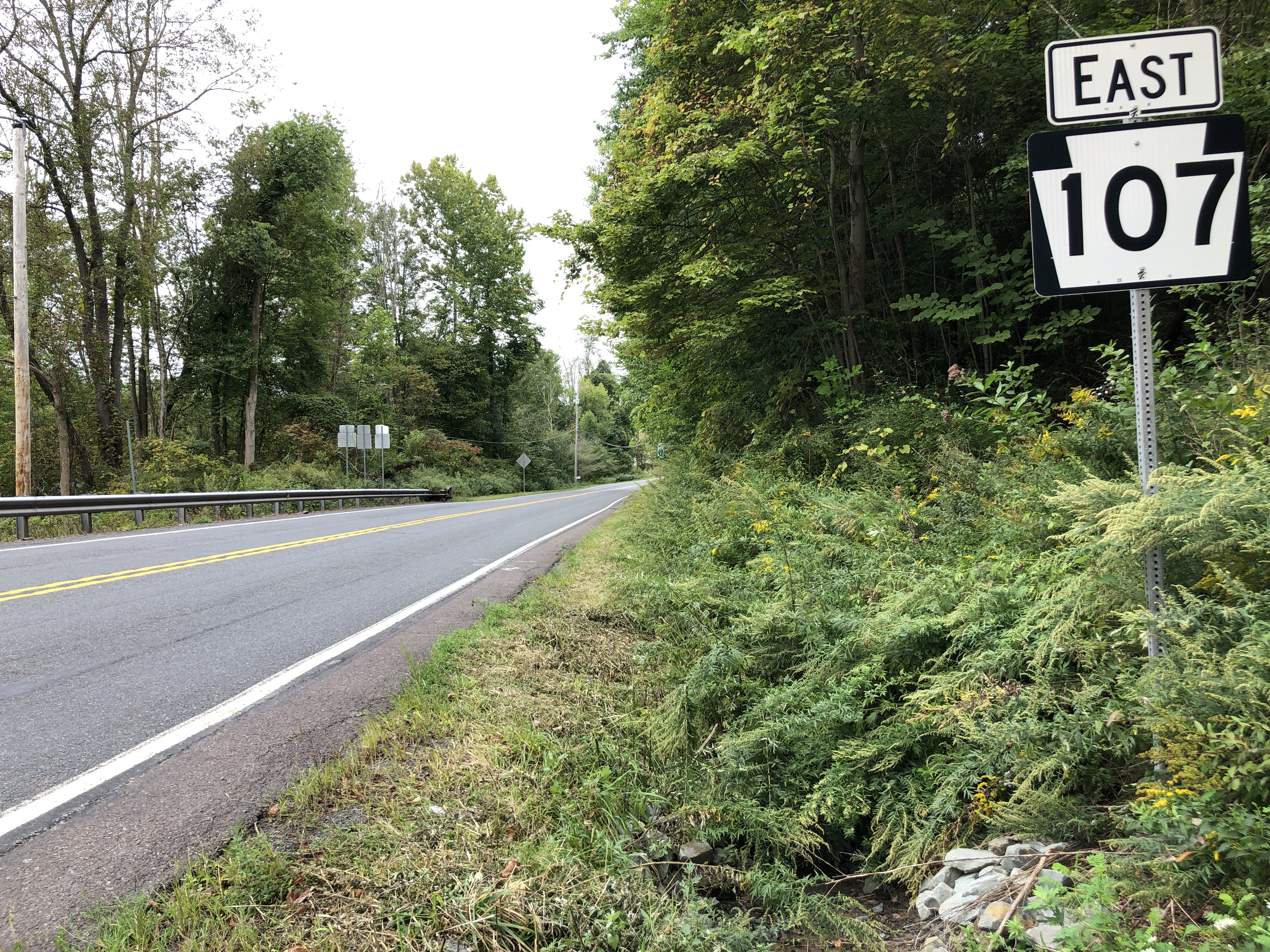
PA 107 eastbound just past its western terminus at US 6/US 11 in Clinton Township

PA 107 begins at an intersection with US 6/US 11 on the border of the borough of Factoryville and Clinton Township in Wyoming County, heading north into Clinton Township on a two-lane undivided road. The route heads through forested areas, curving north-northeast and passing under Norfolk Southern's Sunbury Line. The road crosses into Nicholson Township and heads northeast through more wooded areas with some homes, turning east and passing to the south of Lake Sheridan.

PA 107 enters Benton Township in Lackawanna County and continues south of the lake before running through more woodland with some fields and homes, coming to an intersection with PA 407 in Fleetville. The road heads through more rural areas, coming to an interchange with I-81 before crossing into Scott Township. The route runs through more woods with farmland and residences, becoming Heart Lake Road and forming the border between Greenfield Township to the north and Scott Township to the south. PA 107 passes through Tompkinsville prior to turning southeast to fully enter Scott Township and pass through agricultural areas as it reaches an intersection with PA 247. The road heads through more farmland and woodland with some homes, crossing into Carbondale Township. Here, the route crosses a forested mountain. PA 107 heads into the borough of Mayfield and comes to an interchange with US 6 Bus. Past this interchange, the road turns east and becomes Rushbrook Street and enters residential areas, briefly forming the border between Mayfield to the north and the borough of Jermyn to the south before fully entering Jermyn. The route passes over the Lackawanna River and a Delaware-Lackawanna Railroad line, heading into wooded areas and crossing back into Mayfield. PA 107 comes to its eastern terminus at an interchange with the US 6 freeway on the border of Mayfield and the borough of Archbald.

== History ==
When Pennsylvania first legislated routes in 1911, what is now PA 107 was not given a number. PA 107 was designated in 1928 to run from US 11 in Factoryville east to US 6 (Washington Avenue) in Jermyn along an unpaved road. By 1930, the section of the route between PA 407 in Fleetville and PA 247 (Jordan Hollow Road) was under construction. The entire length of PA 107 was paved in the 1930s. The eastern terminus of the route was cut back to the relocated US 6 at the Scranton-Carbondale Highway (now US 6 Bus.) in the 1940s. PA 107 was extended back east to unnumbered Washington Avenue in Jermyn in the 1970s. In 1995, PA 107 was extended east from Washington Avenue to the newly-constructed US 6 freeway along a new two-lane road.

== Major intersections ==
County	Location	mi	km	Destinations	Notes
Wyoming	Clinton Township	0.000	0.000	US 6 / US 11 (Grand Army of the Republic Highway/Lackawanna Trail)	Western terminus
Lackawanna	Benton Township	5.134	8.262	PA 407 – Waverly, Harford	
Lackawanna	Benton Township	8.670– 8.690	13.953– 13.985	I-81 – Scranton, Binghamton	Exit 202 (I-81)
Lackawanna	Scott Township	12.207	19.645	PA 247 (Wildcat Road) – Greenfield, Forest City, Montdale	
Lackawanna	Mayfield	16.048	25.827	US 6 Bus. (Scranton-Carbondale Highway)	Interchange
Lackawanna	Mayfield	17.190– 17.271	27.665– 27.795	US 6 (Casey Highway) – Scranton, Carbondale	Exit 5 (US 6); eastern terminus
1.000 mi = 1.609 km; 1.000 km = 0.621 mi
