= Scott Township, Lackawanna County, Pennsylvania =

Township in Pennsylvania, US

Scott Township
- Township
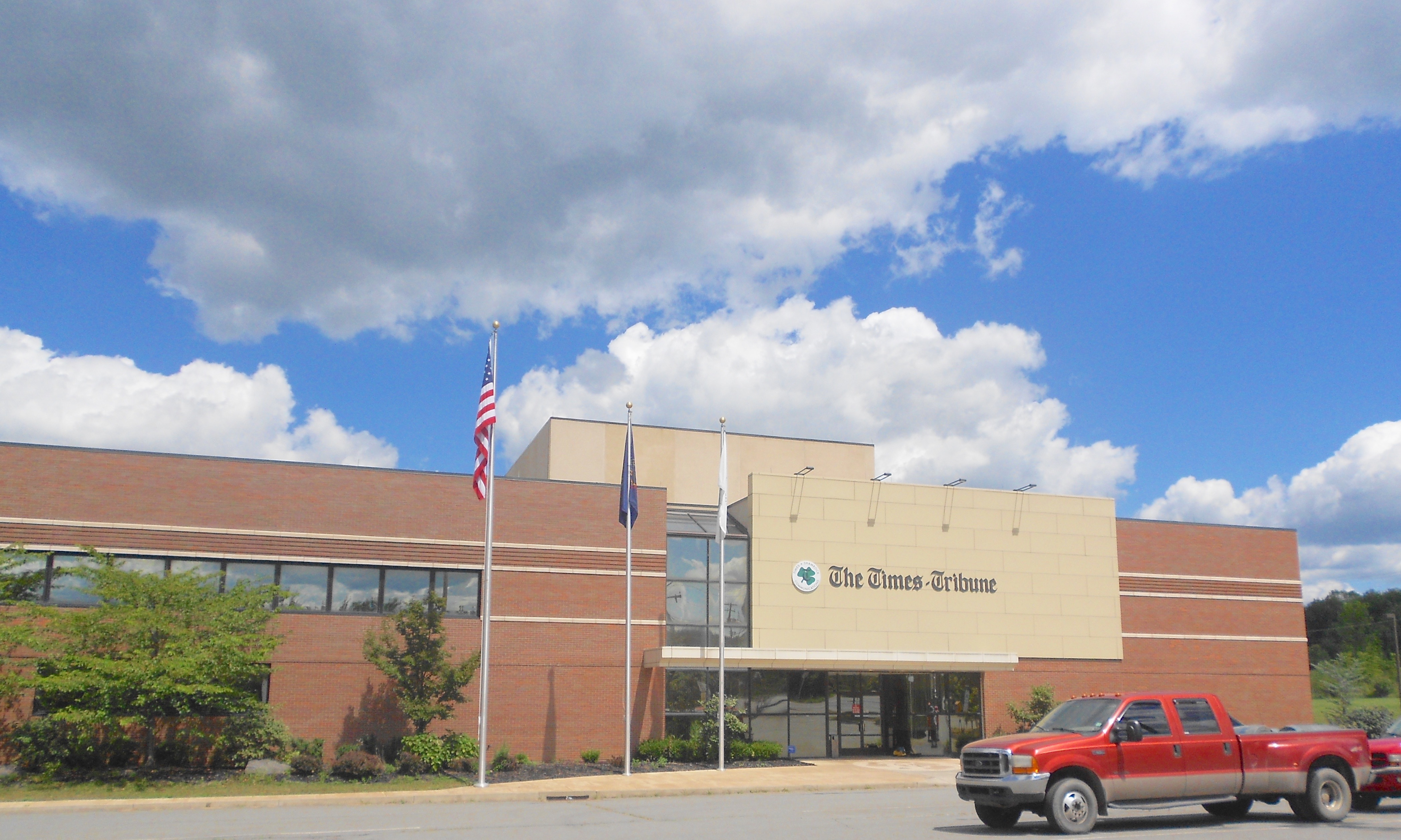
- Times-Tribune printing plant

- Location of Pennsylvania in the United States
- Coordinates: 41°33′N 75°38′W
- Country: United States
- State: Pennsylvania
- County: Lackawanna
- Founded: 1846

Area
  - Total: 27.57 sq mi (71.41 km^{2})
  - Land: 27.20 sq mi (70.46 km^{2})
  - Water: 0.37 sq mi (0.96 km^{2})
- Elevation: 1,598 ft (487 m)

Population (2020)
  - Total: 4,641 ▼
  - Estimate (2021): 4,633
  - Density: 176.7/sq mi (68.21/km^{2})
- Time zone: UTC-5 (EST)
  - Summer (DST): UTC-4 (EDT)
- ZIP Code: 18411, 18414, 18433, 18447
- Area code: 570
- FIPS code: 42-069-68400

Scott Township is a township in the north central area of Lackawanna County, Pennsylvania, United States. As of the 2020 census, it had a population of 4,641.

It is one of the five municipalities comprising the Lakeland School District. Township government consists of three elected supervisors with headquarters at the Joe Terry Civic Center, PA Route 438.

== Geography ==
According to the United States Census Bureau, the township has a total area of 27.6 square miles (71.4 km^{2}). Land occupies 27.2 square miles (70.5 km^{2}). The majority of its use is distributed among small farms, dense wooded areas, and residential development. This particular region makes up part of the extreme eastern edge of the Endless Mountains dissected plateau. The township is generally hilly with minor valleys cut by streams. These creeks—Rush Brook, Kennedy, South Branch Tunkhannock, and Hull—and larger bodies of water like Chapman Lake, Heart Lake, Griffin Reservoir, Peaceful Valley Pond, and Graves Pond account for the remaining 0.39 square miles (1.0 km^{2}), or 1.34%, of the township's area. Approximately the southern quarter of the township and a very small northeast corner drain into the Lackawanna River, with the rest of the watershed trending west eventually into the Susquehanna River many miles upstream from the confluence of the two.

Two roughly defined communities within the township are more commonly known to the broader region: "Justus" refers to the southern portion centered on the intersection of Rt. 347 and Layton Road and is anchored by two heavy equipment dealers and a large greenhouse and garden shop; "Montdale" refers to the central/northern area surrounding the Rts. 247 and 438 crossroads and has three general stores and a gas station. In addition, the Chinchilla census-designated place, primarily located South Abington Township, extends into the southern part of Scott Township.

Many roads connect Scott Township to Greenfield Township in the north, from which it was partitioned in 1846, and to Clarks Summit and "the Abingtons" in the west. Routes 347, 247, and 107 are major traffic routes beyond Bell Mountain to all Lackawanna Valley points north of Scranton, such as Olyphant, Peckville, Eynon, and Jermyn. An approximately 5-mile (8 km) portion of Interstate 81 passes just inside the township's western border. It is accessible by Routes 632 (Waverly Exit #197), 524 (Scott Exit #199), and 438 (East Benton Exit #201). This major thoroughfare places Scott Township at an approximate two-hour drive from important markets like New York City, Philadelphia, state capital Harrisburg, and Syracuse, New York.

Scott Township shares borders with the following municipalities (clockwise from north):

- Greenfield Twp.
- Carbondale Twp.
- Archbald
- Blakely
- Dickson City
- South Abington Twp.
- North Abington Twp.
- Benton Twp.

== Demographics ==
Historical population
Census	Pop.	Note	%±
2010	4,905		—
2020	4,641		−5.4%
2021 (est.)	4,633		−0.2%
U.S. Decennial Census

As of the census of 2010, there were 4,905 people, 1,978 households, and 1,465 families residing in the township. The population density was 180.3 inhabitants per square mile (69.6/km^{2}). There were 2,260 housing units at an average density of 83.1 per square mile (32.1/km^{2}).

The racial makeup of the township was 97.5% White, 0.65% African American, 0.1% American Indian, 0.5% Asian, 0.4% from other races, and 1% from two or more races. Hispanic or Latino of any race were 1% of the population. The vast majority of Scott Township's ancestral composition is Polish at 25.5%, followed by Irish (17.1%), English (15.6%), and German (14.4%). Russian and Welsh are the only others exceeding 5% (each at 6.9%).

There were 1,978 households, out of which 24.9% had children under the age of 18 living with them, 63% were married couples living together, 7.1% had a female householder with no husband present, and 25.9% were non-families. 21.8% of all households were made up of individuals, and 9.8% had someone living alone who was 65 years of age or older. The average household size was 2.48 and the average family size was 2.88.

In the township the population was spread out, with 18.7% under the age of 18, 64% from 18 to 64, and 17.3% who were 65 years of age or older. The median age was 46.5 years.

The median income for a household in the township was $53,520, and the median income for a family was $68,974. Males had a median income of $49,605 versus $36,890 for females. The per capita income for the township was $31,557. About 3.6% of families and 6.1% of the population were below the poverty line, including 14.5% of those under age 18 and 1.1% of those age 65 or over.

The township is one of the more rural suburbs of Scranton, Pennsylvania's sixth largest city. Scranton and its numerous satellite boroughs provide most of the employment, commerce, and recreation opportunities for Scott Township's residents. Manufacturing is the predominant industry among township workers, though most factories are located elsewhere. The average travel time to work is 20.2 minutes.
