= U.S. Route 6 in Pennsylvania =

Section of U.S. Route in Pennsylvania

U.S. Route 6
- Grand Army of the Republic Highway
- US 6 highlighted in red and alternate routes in blue

Route information
- Maintained by PennDOT and JIBC
- Length: 403 mi (649 km)
- Existed: 1926–present
- History: designated as PA 7 in 1924
- Tourist routes: Crawford Lakelands Scenic Byway; Gateway to the Endless Mountains Scenic Byway; Governor Casey Scenic Byway; Route 6 Heritage Corridor Scenic Byway

Major junctions
- West end: US 6 at the Ohio state line near Linesville
- I-79 near Meadville; US 19 / US 322 in Meadville; US 62 in Warren; US 219 near Mount Jewett; I-99 / US 15 in Mansfield; US 220 near Towanda; I-81 / I-476 Toll / Penna Turnpike NE Extension / US 11 in Scranton; I-81 / I-84 / I-380 in Dunmore; US 209 in Milford; I-84 in Matamoras
- East end: US 6 / US 209 at the New York state line in Matamoras

Location
- Country: United States
- State: Pennsylvania
- Counties: Crawford, Erie, Warren, McKean, Potter, Tioga, Bradford, Wyoming, Lackawanna, Wayne, Pike

Highway system
- United States Numbered Highway System; List; Special; Divided; Pennsylvania State Route System; Interstate; US; State; Scenic; Legislative
← PA 5	→ PA 6
← US 6N	→ PA 8

U.S. Route 6 (US 6) travels east–west near the north edge of the U.S. state of Pennsylvania from the Ohio state line near Pymatuning Reservoir east to the Mid-Delaware Bridge over the Delaware River into Port Jervis, New York. It is the longest highway segment in the commonwealth. Most of it is a two-lane rural highway, with some freeway bypasses around larger towns. Except east of Dunmore, where it is paralleled by Interstate 84 (I-84), it is the main route in its corridor. What is now I-80—the Keystone Shortway—was once planned along the US 6 corridor as a western extension of I-84. The corridor was originally the Roosevelt Highway from Erie, Pennsylvania, to Port Jervis, New York, designated Pennsylvania Route 7 (PA 7) in 1924. The PA 7 designation soon disappeared, but, as US 6 was extended and relocated, the Roosevelt Highway followed it. The Pennsylvania section of US 6 was renamed the Grand Army of the Republic Highway in 1946; this name was applied to its full transcontinental length by 1953.

US 6 meets with US 19 near Meadville, where it turns north with US 19 to a point east of Edinboro. There it turns east (while US 6N heads west to US 20 at West Springfield) and passes through the Northern Tier. At Towanda, it turns more southeasterly to reach Dunmore, then turning back northeast out of Dunmore to Carbondale and generally east and southeast to New York. US 6 fully encompasses three Pennsylvania Scenic Byways: the Route 6 Heritage Corridor Scenic Byway in Warren, McKean, Potter, and Tioga counties, the Gateway to the Endless Mountains Scenic Byway along the bypass of Tunkhannock, and the Governor Casey Scenic Byway along the freeway portion in Lackawanna County between I-81 in Dunmore and PA 247 in Jessup.

At 403 miles (649 km) in length, US 6 is the longest numbered highway in Pennsylvania.

== Route description ==
=== Ohio to Warren ===
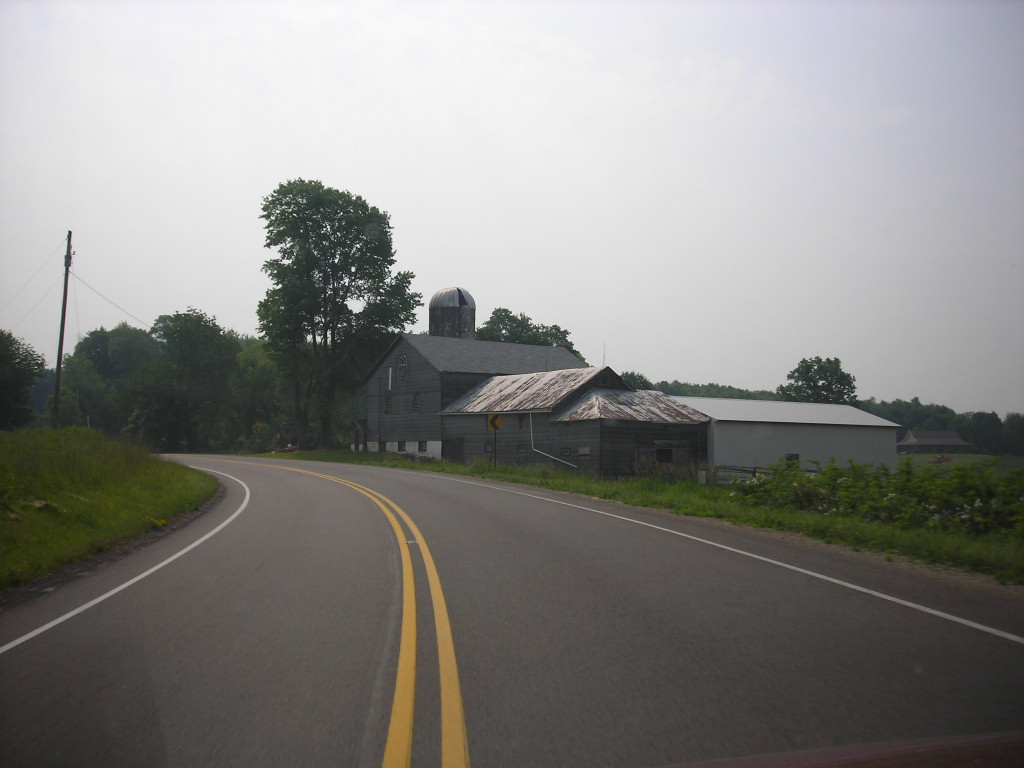
US 6 eastbound west of Conneaut Lake

US 6 enters Pennsylvania from Ohio in Crawford County, heading southeast as a two-lane undivided road through farmland and woodland to the north of Pymatuning State Park, which is home to Pymatuning Reservoir. The route heads into the borough of Linesville, where it heads southeast through developed areas of the borough on Penn Street before turning east onto East Erie Street, passing north of Conneaut Area Senior High School. The road continues southeast through more rural areas as it heads away from the state park, passing over the Canadian National Railway's Bessemer Subdivision railroad line. US 6 intersects the southern terminus of PA 618 before it reaches a junction with PA 285 on the western edge of the borough of Conneaut Lake. Here, US 6 heads east for a concurrency with PA 285 and the two routes head east through the borough on Water Street. The road intersects US 322/PA 18 in the center of Conneaut Lake, where the two routes join US 6 and PA 285. A block later, PA 285 splits to the south. US 6/US 322/PA 18 become a five-lane road with a center left-turn lane and head east out of the borough, passing to the south of Conneaut Lake. PA 18 splits from US 6/US 322 by turning to the north, with US 6/US 322 continuing east-northeast on Conneaut Lake Road through farms and woods with some development. The road heads into a business area to the west of the city of Meadville and comes to a roundabout with US 19 and the southern terminus of PA 98, at which point US 19 becomes concurrent with US 6 and US 322. The roadway becomes a four-lane divided highway and comes to a cloverleaf interchange with I-79. Past this interchange, the three routes reach an intersection with the southern terminus of PA 102 before curving north and entering Meadville upon crossing French Creek and a Western New York and Pennsylvania Railroad line. The road becomes French Creek Parkway and US 322 splits to the east, with US 6/US 19 continuing north through developed areas to the east of the railroad line. The two routes leave Meadville and narrow to a two-lane undivided road, passing through wooded areas with some fields and development as it follows the French Creek and the Western New York and Pennsylvania Railroad. In the borough of Saegertown, US 6/US 19 head north along Main Street and form a concurrency with PA 198, intersecting PA 198 at roundabouts on either end of the borough. The road continues northeast through more rural areas alongside the creek and railroad, reaching the borough of Venango. Here, the two routes head north on Church Street before turning east onto Cussewago Street and curving north onto River Street. US 6/US 19 run northeast through farms and woods with some development to the borough of Cambridge Springs. The two routes head northeast on Venango Avenue before intersecting the northern terminus of PA 86 and the western terminus of PA 408 in the center of the borough, where they turn onto North Main Street and continue northeast. US 6/US 19 reach a junction with the southern terminus of PA 99 before leaving Cambridge Springs and heading through rural areas.

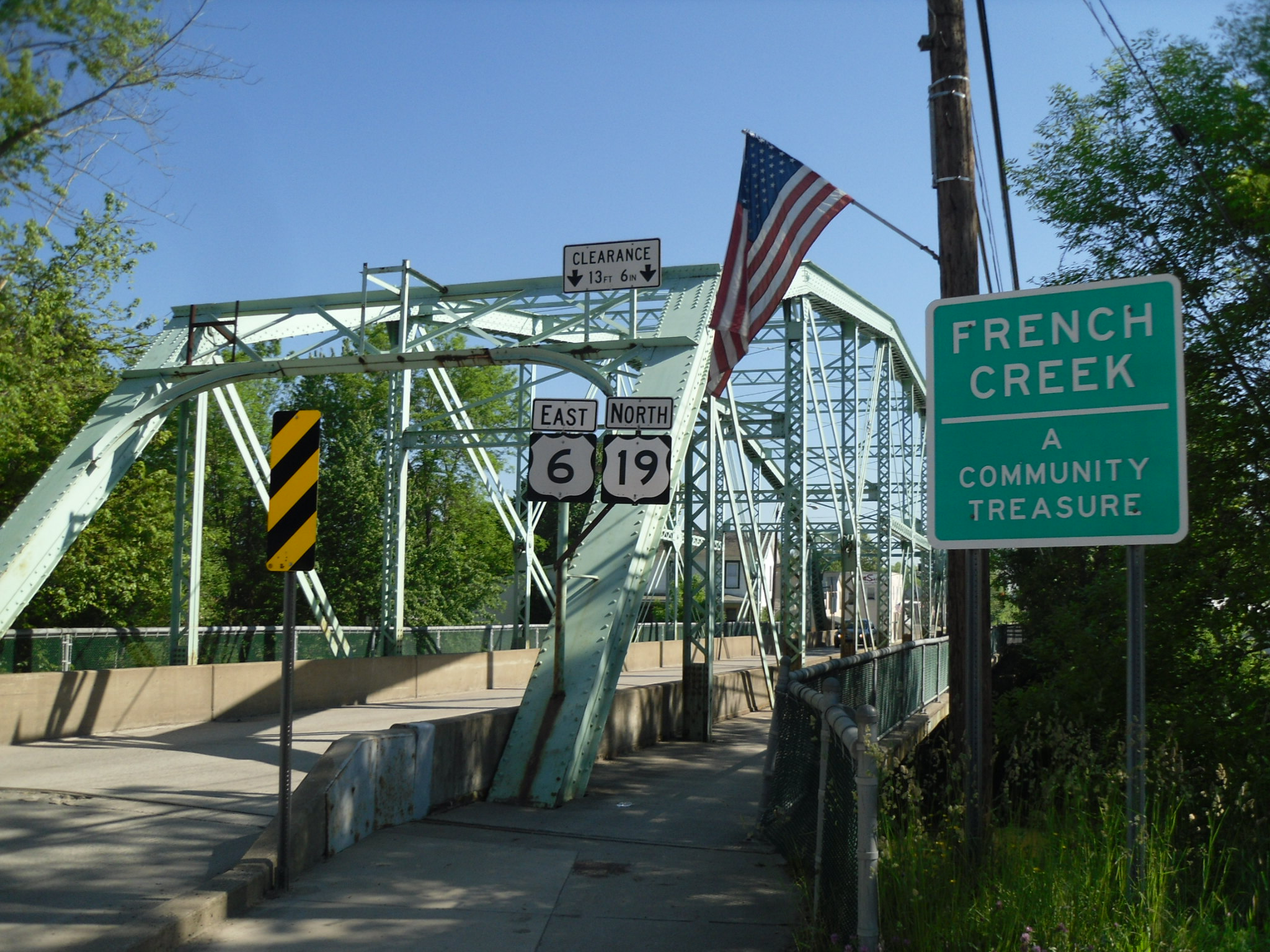
US 6 eastbound/US 19 northbound crossing the French Creek in Cambridge Springs

US 6/US 19 continue into Erie County and comes to an intersection with the eastern terminus of US 6N, at which point US 6 splits from US 19 by turning to the east and crossing French Creek. The route passes through the borough of Mill Village, where it crosses under a Western New York and Pennsylvania Railroad line, and runs through a mix of farmland and woodland with some development. The road continues through rural land and turns northeast to reach the borough of Union City, where it comes to a junction with PA 8. At this point, US 6 heads north along with PA 8 through developed areas of the borough on South Main Street, crossing a Western New York and Pennsylvania Railroad line. In the downtown area of Union City, US 6 splits from PA 8 by turning east onto East High Street at a crossing of a Buffalo and Pittsburgh Railroad line. The route leaves Union City and heads through farm fields and woods, reaching a junction with PA 89 to the north of the borough of Elgin. Here, PA 89 forms a concurrency with US 6 before splitting to the south. The route runs east-northeast through wooded areas with some development prior to entering the city of Corry. In Corry, US 6 becomes West Columbus Avenue and runs through developed areas in the northern part of the city, crossing PA 426 and becoming East Columbus Avenue. In the eastern part of Corry, the road passes south of Corry Memorial Hospital.

The route enters Warren County, where it heads into the Pennsylvania Wilds region, and runs through farmland prior to an intersection with the western terminus of PA 957 in Columbus as it runs parallel to a Western New York and Pennsylvania Railroad line to the south. The road crosses under the railroad tracks and heads through a mix of farms and woods before it curves to the southeast away from the railroad tracks and comes to a junction with the southern terminus of PA 958. US 6 continues south-southeast through rural land and reaches the community of Pittsfield, where it intersects PA 27 and turns to the east, forming a concurrency with that route. The road heads east through a mix of rural areas and development parallel to a Buffalo and Pittsburgh Railroad line located south of the road to the borough of Youngsville, where PA 27 splits to the north. At this point, US 6 becomes a four-lane divided highway called the Youngsville Bypass that crosses Brokenstraw Creek and heads to the south of Youngsville. East of the borough, the route comes to an interchange with East Main Street that provides access to Youngsville and Irvine. The highway heads east through rural areas alongside the Brokenstraw Creek and reaches a trumpet interchange with US 62. At this point, US 62 heads east for a concurrency with US 6, and the road runs through wooded areas and development to the north of a Buffalo and Pittsburgh Railroad line and the Allegheny River, transitioning into a five-lane road with a center left-turn lane. The road becomes a four-lane divided highway again and reaches the city of Warren, where it passes over the railroad and US 62 and US 6 Business (US 6 Bus.) head northeast into the central part of the city at an interchange. US 6 crosses the Allegheny River and passes through developed areas in the southern part of Warren, reaching an eastbound exit and westbound entrance at Main Avenue. Past this interchange, the divided highway narrows to two lanes before the road curves to the southeast and becomes a two-lane undivided road that runs through wooded areas with a Buffalo and Pittsburgh Railroad line and the river to the northeast. At the southeast edge of Warren, the roadway crosses the railroad tracks and US 6 Bus. returns to US 6 at an intersection.

=== Warren to Mansfield ===
After passing Warren, US 6 reaches an intersection with the western terminus of PA 59, which heads east to follow the Allegheny River. From here, the route continues southeast into the Allegheny National Forest, winding to the south parallel to a Buffalo and Pittsburgh Railroad line as it enters mountainous terrain. US 6 passes southeast through developed areas of the borough of Clarendon along North Main and South Main streets. Past here, the road heads south-southeast through more of the national forest, with occasional development along the road. In the community of Sheffield, the route comes to an intersection with the eastern terminus of PA 666 and curves to the east. US 6 continues through rugged forests and heads northeast before making a turn to the southeast.

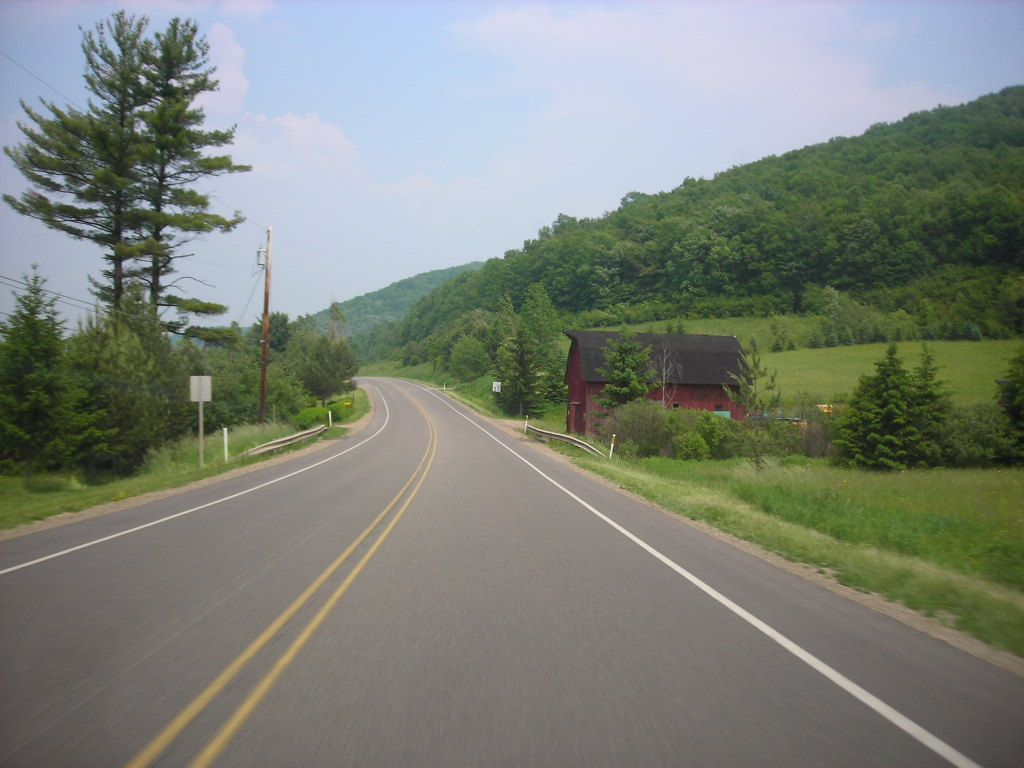
US 6 eastbound in McKean County

The route crosses into McKean County and heads southeast through more of the Allegheny National Forest parallel to the railroad tracks. US 6 leaves the national forest and runs through more rural land with some development before it enters the borough of Kane. Here, the route heads south through developed areas on North Fraley Street, passing UPMC Kane hospital before running through the downtown area. Here, US 6 comes to a junction with the northern terminus of PA 66, with PA 66 continuing south on South Fraley Street and US 6 turning east onto Greeves Street. The route soon turns south onto Edgar James Street and east onto Biddle Street, passing more development and forming a short concurrency with PA 321. At this point, the railroad tracks split from paralleling the road. The road leaves Kane and becomes Kane Lantz Corners Road, winding east through a mix of farms and woods with some development. US 6 curves northeast and runs through more rural areas, coming to an intersection with US 219 in Lantz Corners. Past here, the route heads to the east and passes over the Buffalo and Pittsburgh Railroad's B&P Main Line Subdivision line as it enters the borough of Mount Jewett, heading through developed areas of the borough as West Main and East Main streets. East of Mount Jewett, the road heads southeast through forested mountains, passing through Hazel Hurst and turning to the northeast. US 6 reaches a junction with the western terminus of PA 146 in Marvindale and continues northeast through wooded mountains with some fields and development. The road enters the borough of Smethport and becomes Marvin Street, heading north through developed areas and coming to an intersection with the eastern terminus of PA 59. Here, the route turns east onto West Main Street and passes through the downtown area, becoming East Main Street before turning east onto East Street and intersecting PA 46 on the eastern edge of the borough. At this point, PA 46 heads east for a concurrency with US 6, with the two route continuing to East Smethport, where PA 46 splits to the south. US 6 winds east through wooded areas with some farmfields. The road turns southeast and runs through forests before heading east into the borough of Port Allegany, where it crosses the Allegheny River and the Buffalo Line railroad line, which is owned by Norfolk Southern Railway and operated by the Western New York and Pennsylvania Railroad, before it comes to a junction with PA 155. At this point, US 6 turns south for a concurrency with PA 155 and the two routes pass through developed areas of the borough along North Main and South Main streets. The two routes split at the south end of Port Allegany, with US 6 heading east through wooded mountains with some farm fields and development to the north of the Allegheny River.

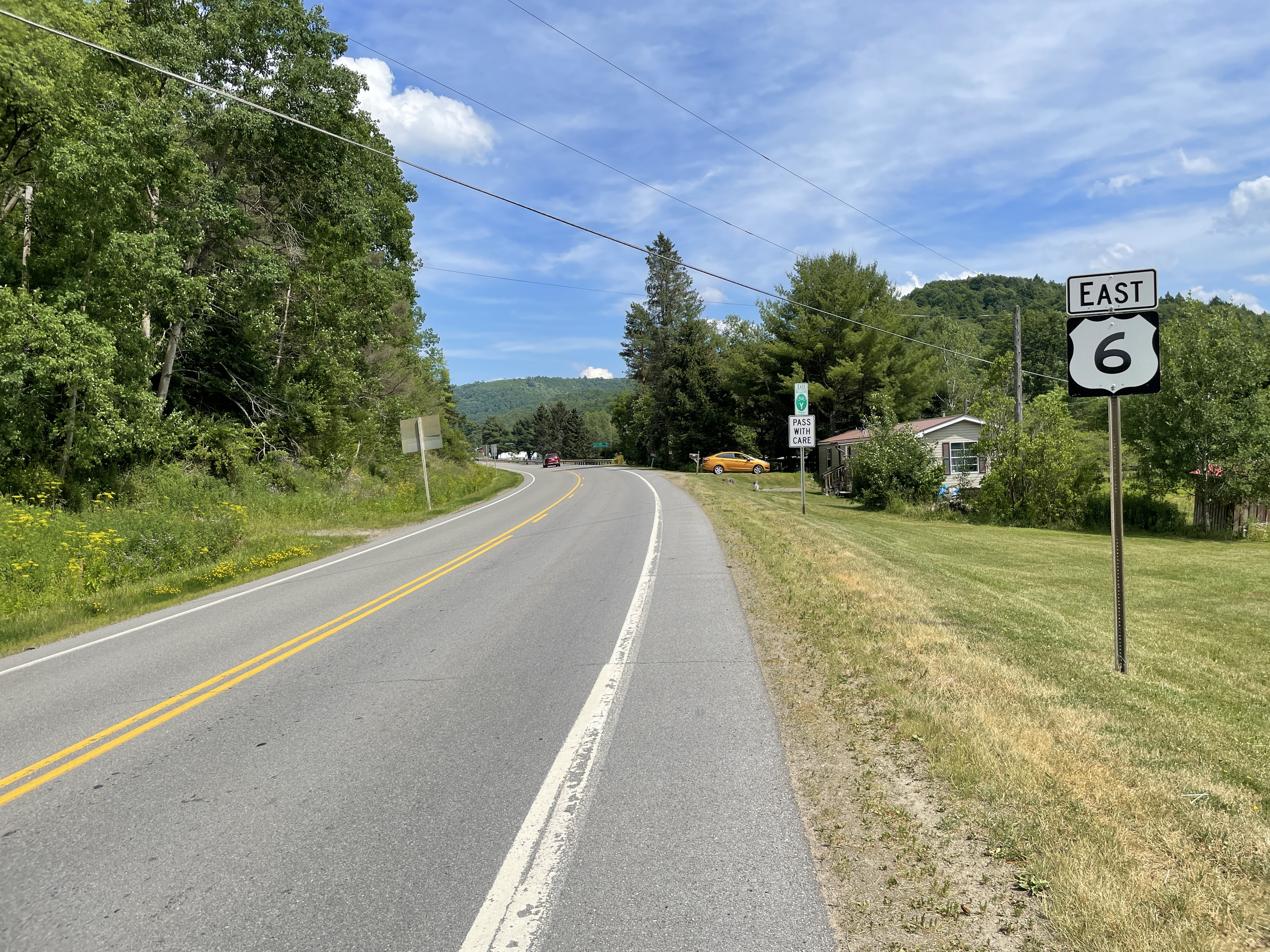
US 6 eastbound past PA 44 in Sweden Valley

US 6 enters Potter County and continues east through a mix of forested mountains and farmland with some development north of the river, passing the community of Roulette. The road continues southeast through rural areas, turning to the northeast as it passes south of a tract of Susquehannock State Forest. The route enters more developed areas and continues into the borough of Coudersport, where it becomes Port Allegany Road and then Eulalia Street. US 6 turns east onto Chestnut Street and crosses the Allegheny River. The route turns north onto South Main Street and heads through the downtown area of Coudersport, crossing the river again and becoming North Main Street. US 6 reaches an intersection with PA 44, which continues north on North Main Street, near the Potter County Courthouse. At this point, US 6 and PA 44 turn east for a concurrency on East 2nd Street, crossing the Allegheny River and passing through more developed areas to the south of forests. The two routes run to the north of Coudersport Area Junior/Senior High School along this stretch. The road has an intersection with the northern terminus of PA 872 before it leaves Coudersport as it passes south of UPMC Cole hospital, heading southeast through wooded areas with some fields and development to the north of Mill Creek. In the community of Sweden Valley, PA 44 splits from US 6 by turning to the south to follow the creek. US 6 heads east through woodland, entering the Susquehannock State Forest and traversing Denton Hill. After descending the hill, the road passes north of Denton Hill State Park and south of a rest area accessible from both directions and the Pennsylvania Lumber Museum. The route comes to an intersection with the southern terminus of PA 449 in Walton, at which point it leaves the state forest. US 6 begins to follow the Pine Creek, and it continues southeast through forested mountains with some fields and development. The route heads into the borough of Galeton and becomes West Main Street, heading east near developed areas and coming to a junction with the northern terminus of PA 144 in the center of the borough. Here, the road becomes East Main Street before it leaves the borough and runs through rural land with some development.

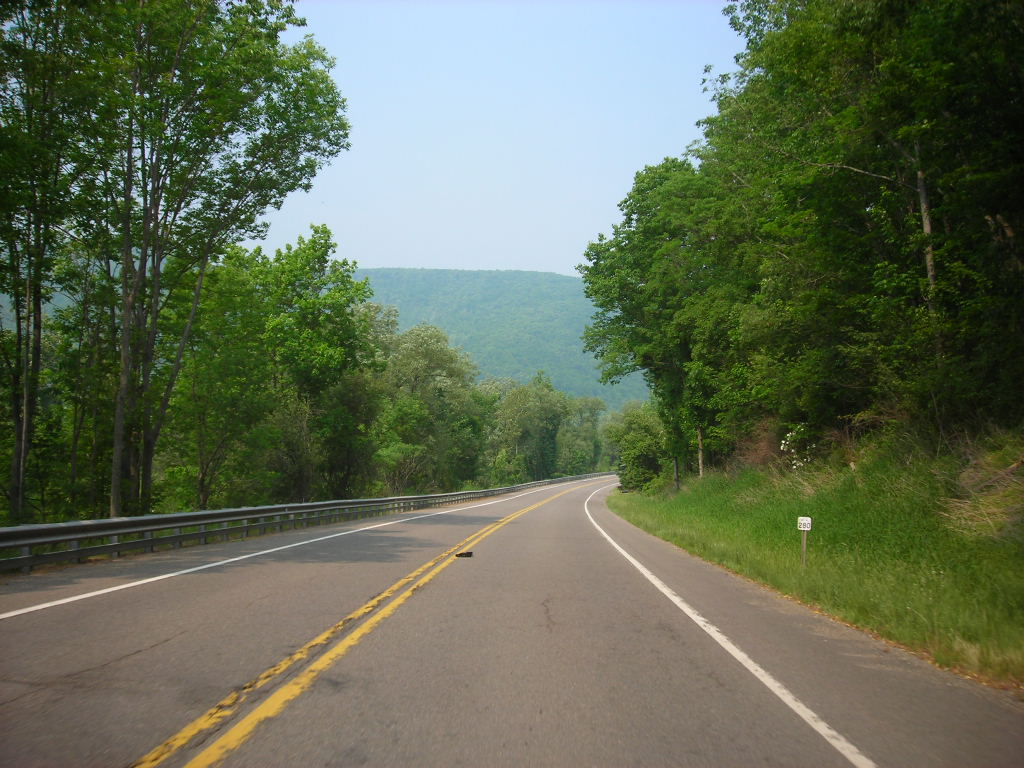
US 6 eastbound in Tioga County

US 6 crosses into Tioga County and continues east through forested mountains with some farmfields and development to the north of Pine Creek. In the community of Gaines, the route comes to an intersection with the southern terminus of PA 349. Following this, the road heads north of a rest area accessible from both directions and winds east through Tioga State Forest as it passes through more rugged terrain. Farther east, US 6 passes near some farmfields before it reaches an intersection with the western terminus of PA 362 in the community of Ansonia, where the Pine Creek turns to the south and runs through the Pine Creek Gorge. The road continues northeast through wooded mountains and farmland as it passes to the south of Tioga State Forest. The route winds northeast through more rural land before it reaches an intersection with PA 287 in Wellsboro Junction. Here, US 6 turns south for a concurrency with PA 287, with the two routes running through a mix of farms and woods to the west of the parallel Wellsboro and Corning Railroad. The two routes head into the borough of Wellsboro and become Main Street, running through developed areas and turning to the southwest. The road comes to a junction with PA 660 in the downtown area, where PA 287 continues southwest along with PA 660 on Main Street while US 6 heads east along with PA 660 on East Avenue, which alternates from a three-lane road with a center left-turn lane to a two-lane road as it passes through more of the borough. The two routes leave Wellsboro and become a two-lane road called Roosevelt Highway that heads northeast through a mix of farm- and woodland with some development. PA 660 splits to the east and US 6 runs northeast through more rural land prior to reaching an interchange with I-99/US 15 on the western edge of the borough of Mansfield.

=== Mansfield to Scranton ===
Past the I-99 interchange, US 6 heads into Mansfield and becomes West Wellsboro Street, heading through developed areas and crossing the Tioga River. The route continues into the downtown area, where it crosses US 15 Bus. and becomes West Wellsboro Street. US 6 becomes Sullivan Street and curves northeast and then southeast as it heads north of the Mansfield University of Pennsylvania campus. The route leaves Mansfield and becomes Roosevelt Highway, continuing southeast through wooded areas with some fields and reaching a junction with the southern terminus of PA 549. The road heads east through a mix of farmland and woodland with occasional development, passing through the community of Mainesburg.

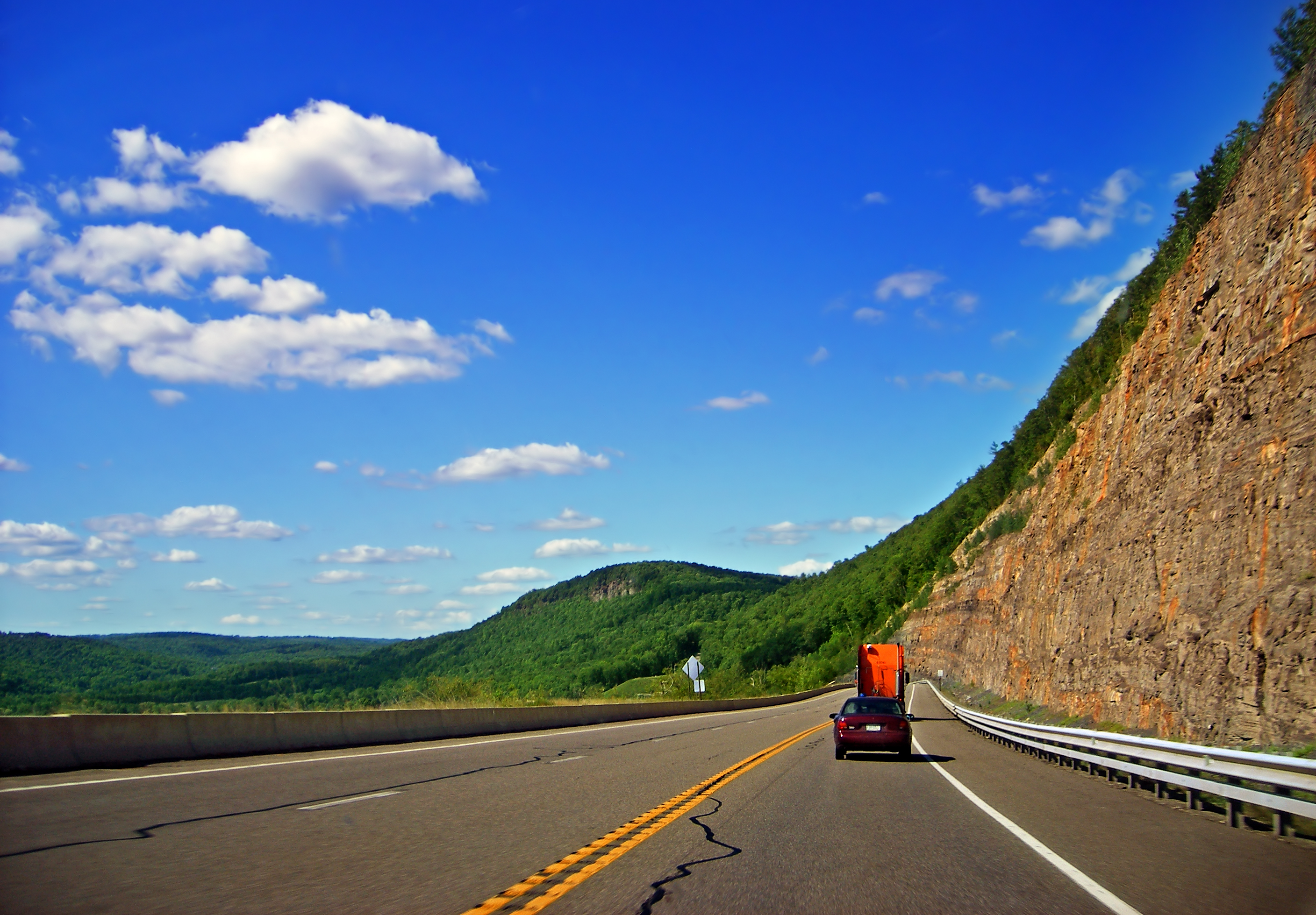
US 6 westbound in Bradford County

US 6 enters Bradford County and heads into the Endless Mountains region, continuing through hilly areas of farms and woods. A short distance past the county line, the road runs south of a rest area accessible from both directions. The route passes through the borough of Sylvania on Sylvania Road before running through more rural land as Roosevelt Highway. The road turns southeast and passes to the southwest of the Guthrie Troy Community Hospital before it enters the borough of Troy. Here, US 6 becomes West Main Street and runs through developed areas, curving to the east and intersecting PA 14 in the downtown area. At this point, PA 14 becomes concurrent with US 6 and the two route head northeast along Elmira Street. The road leaves Troy and turns east, with PA 14 splitting to the north. US 6 continues southeast along Roosevelt Highway through a mix of farmfields and woodland with occasional development, curving back to the east. The route continues through rural land and bends to the northeast, passing through the borough of Burlington on Main Street. The road becomes Roosevelt Highway again and winds east through more farms and woods, turning northeast. US 6 comes to an interchange with US 220, at which point it heads through developed areas in North Towanda. The route turns south-southeast and becomes Reuter Boulevard before it heads into the borough of Towanda, where it becomes York Avenue and runs past development. US 6 turns south onto Main Street and passes through the downtown area before turning east and crossing over a Reading Blue Mountain and Northern Railroad line, the Susquehanna River, and the Lehigh Secondary railroad line that is owned by Norfolk Southern Railway and operated by the Lehigh Railway to leave Towanda. The route becomes Golden Mile Road, a three-lane road with a center left-turn lane that runs northeast through business areas in East Towanda. The road turns east and crosses PA 187 in Wysox, where it narrows to two lanes and becomes unnamed. US 6 continues southeast as follows a winding path that passes through a mix of farm- and woodland with some development to the northeast of the Lehigh Railway and the Susquehanna River. The route runs east of the Marie Antoinette Scenic Overlook and comes to an intersection with the southern terminus of PA 409. Past this intersection, the road continues south alongside the railroad and the river and traverses a hill, where it passes east of the Wyalusing Rocks Scenic Overlook, before coming to the borough of Wyalusing. Here, US 6 runs southeast through developed areas of the borough on State Street and comes to a junction with the western terminus of PA 706. After leaving Wyalusing, the route heads northeast through farms and woods with some development, turning to the southeast as it passes north of the railroad and the river.

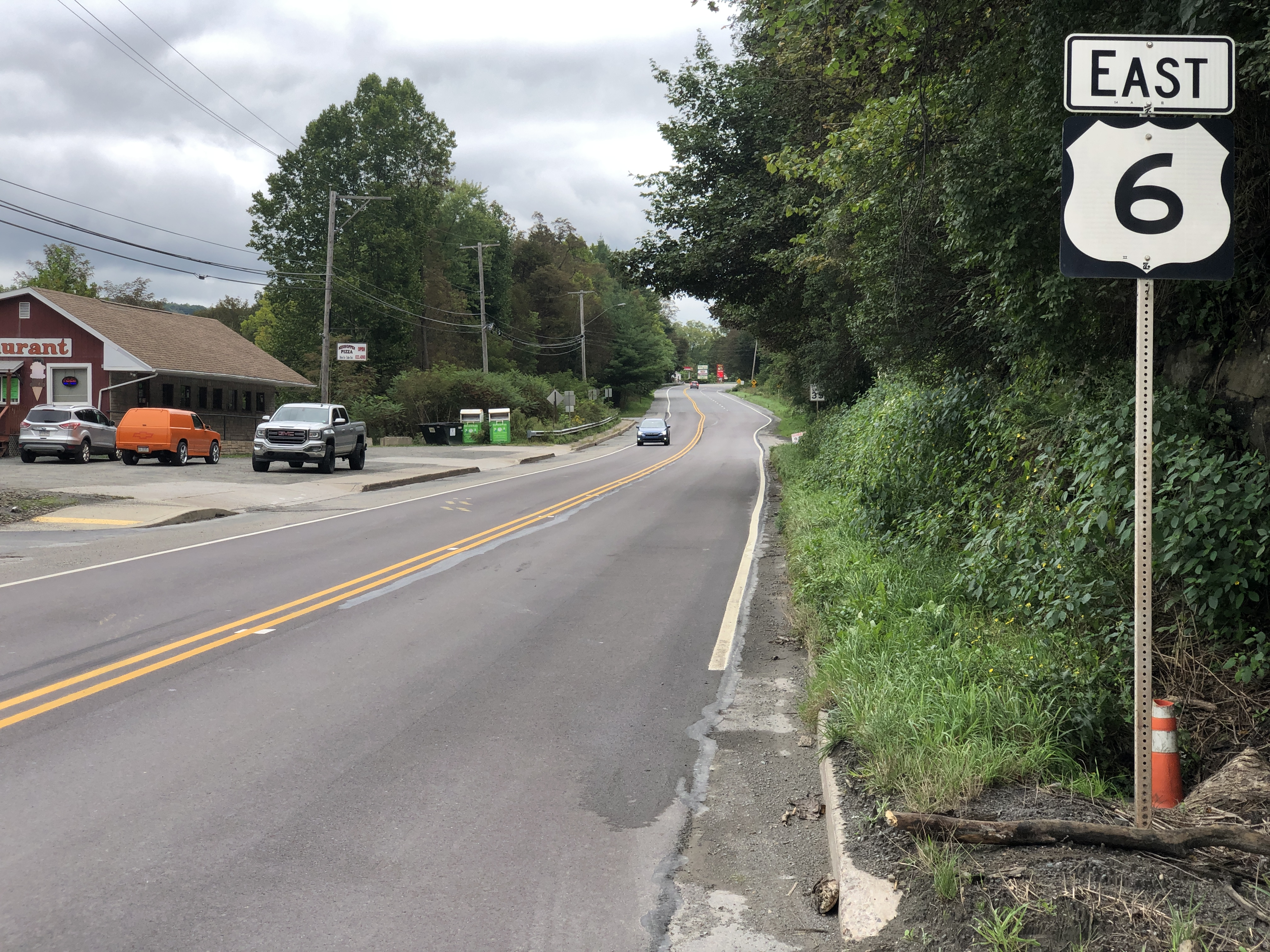
US 6 eastbound at PA 267 in Meshoppen

The route crosses into Wyoming County and heads into the borough of Laceyville, where it passes near developed areas and reaches an intersection with the southern terminus of PA 367. From here, the road continues southeast through farmland and woodland with occasional development alongside the Lehigh Railway and the Susquehanna River on Roosevelt Highway, winding along. US 6 bends to the east and reaches the borough of Meshoppen, where it becomes River Street and has a junction with the southern terminus of PA 267. The route continues southeast through rural areas with some industrial development as Roosevelt Highway and comes to an intersection with the northern terminus of PA 87, where it turns east as an unnamed road. The road heads through farmfields and woodland with some developed areas, curving to the south. US 6 comes to an interchange with the western terminus of US 6 Bus., which heads southeast into the borough of Tunkhannock. Immediately after the interchange is an eastbound runaway truck ramp. At this point, the route becomes a two-lane bypass of the center of Tunhannock to the south, closely following the Reading Blue Mountain and Northern Railroad's Susquehanna Branch line and the Susquehanna River. The road curves east and enters Tunkhannock as it runs between developed areas to the north and the railroad tracks and the river to the south, coming to an intersection with PA 29 and crossing Tunkhannock Creek. US 6 continues east and intersects PA 92, which heads southeast along the Susquehanna River. At this point, PA 92 becomes concurrent with US 6, and the road soon reaches a junction with the eastern terminus of US 6 Bus. at the eastern edge of Tunkhannock. The two routes head northeast and follow Tunkhannock Creek through wooded areas with some farm fields and development. In Dixon, PA 92 splits to the northeast and US 6 continues east through more rural land with some development. Farther east, the route comes to an interchange with US 11, and the two routes become concurrent along a four-lane divided highway. The road heads east to the borough of Factoryville, where it intersects the western terminus of PA 107 and turns southeast through wooded areas and development. The highway turns to the east as it passes north of Keystone College.

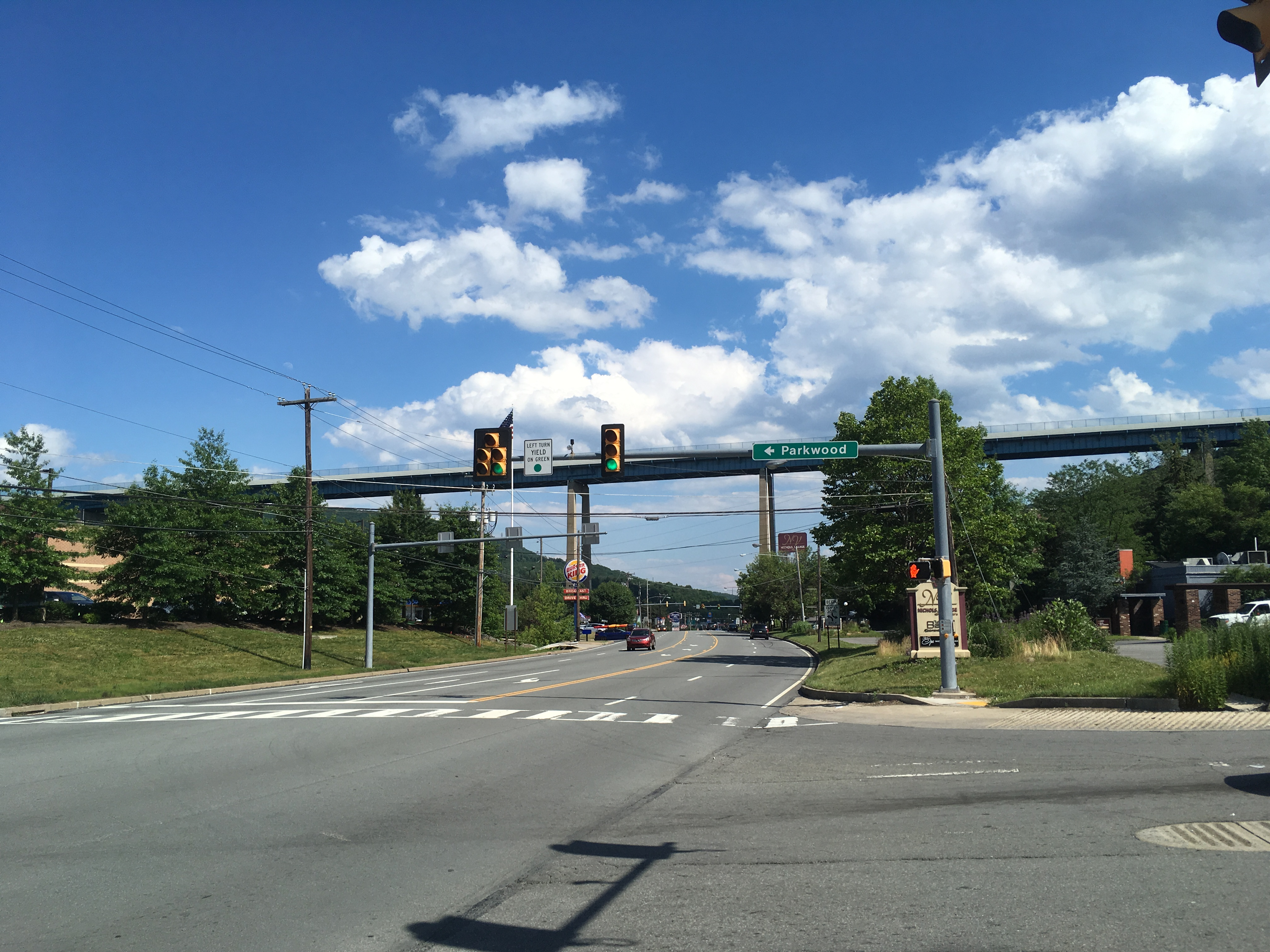
US 6 eastbound/US 11 southbound approaching the interchange with I-81 and the northern terminus of I-476 in Clarks Summit

US 6/US 11 enter Lackawanna County and continue through forested areas with some development, turning to the southeast. In La Plume, the road has an intersection with the western end of PA 438. The two routes run through more rural land before heading south into the borough of Dalton. In this borough, the road becomes Lackawanna Trail and passes near developed areas, coming to an interchange with the western terminus of PA 632. Following this, US 6/US 11 run south-southeast through more forested areas and development, crossing into the borough of Clarks Summit. Here, the two routes turn to the southeast and narrow to two-lane undivided North State Street, passing through developed areas of the borough and crossing over Norfolk Southern Railway's Sunbury Line. In the center of Clarks Summit, the road becomes South State Street and gains a second eastbound lane. US 6/US 11 leave Clarks Summit and become Northern Boulevard, a five-lane road with a center left-turn lane that passes through a business district. The road passes under a viaduct carrying I-476 (Pennsylvania Turnpike Northeast Extension) before reaching a junction with the southern terminus of PA 407. A short distance later, US 6 splits from US 11 at a trumpet interchange onto a freeway that heads north, with US 11 continuing southeast along Northern Boulevard toward the city of Scranton. US 6 soon exits at another trumpet interchange, with the freeway becoming I-476 and making a hairpin turn to the southwest, and heads east a short distance to a trumpet interchange with I-81.

=== Scranton to Matamoras ===
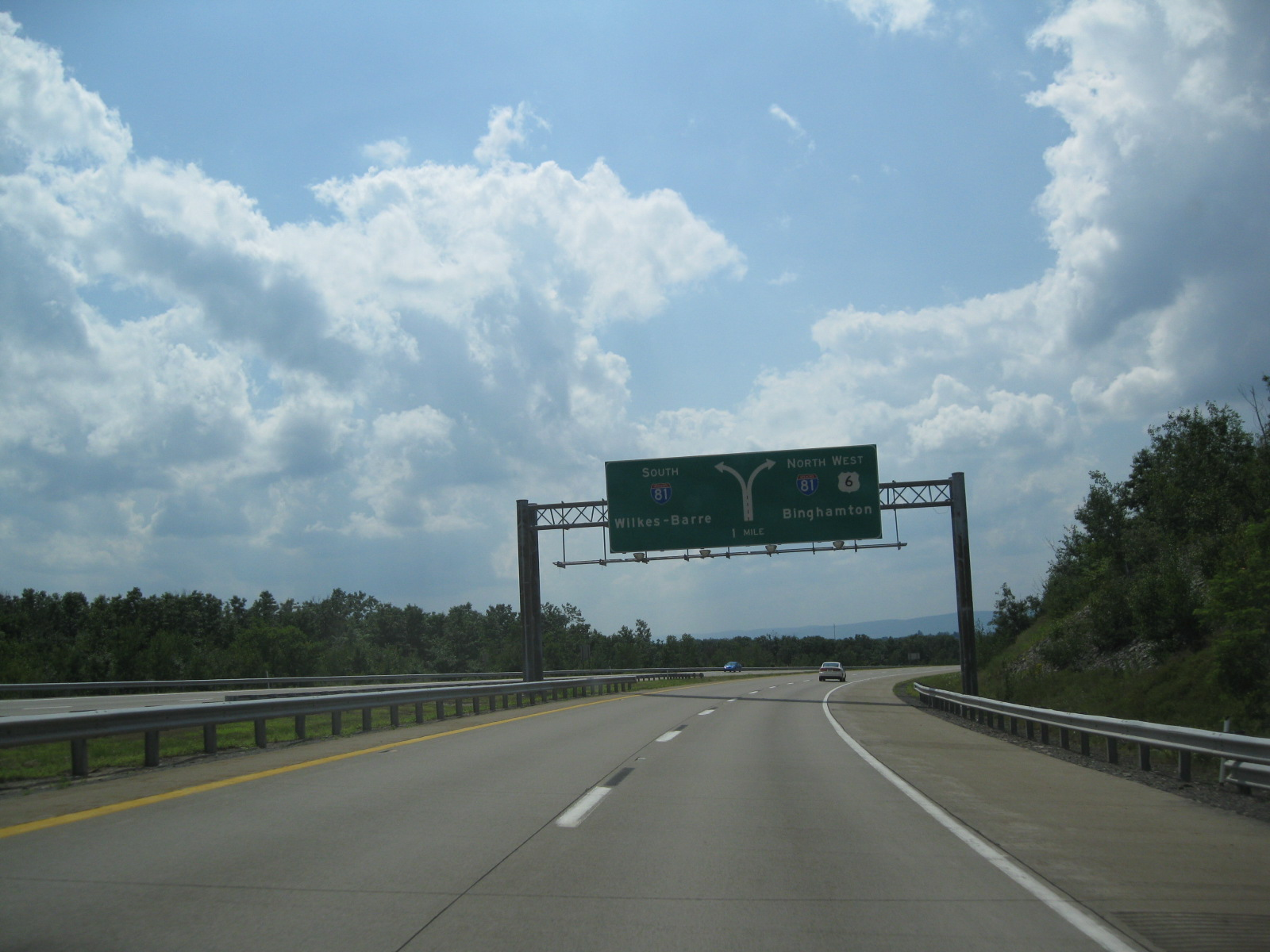
US 6 freeway westbound approaching I-81 in Dunmore

At this interchange, US 6 heads south for a concurrency with I-81 on a four-lane freeway, turning southeast as it passes near developed areas with US 11 parallel to the southwest. The two roads pass through a gap between forested Bald Mountain to the southwest and forested Bell Mountain to the northeast, curving to the south. At this point, the freeway heads into the city of Scranton and the Wyoming Valley, continuing southeast to a cloverleaf interchange with the western terminus of US 6 Bus. and US 11 to the southwest of Viewmont Mall near the borough of Dickson City. I-81/US 6 pass near more developed areas and reach the Main Avenue exit that serves Dickson City. Following this, the freeway crosses a Delaware-Lackawanna Railroad line and the Lackawanna River before it turns to the south, entering the borough of Dunmore. I-81/US 6 curves southeast and passes near more development, reaching an interchange with PA 347. A short distance later, the freeway reaches an interchange where I-81 splits to the southwest, I-84/I-380 head to the southeast, and US 6 continues east along a four-lane freeway called the Governor Casey Highway. Following this interchange, the route bends northeast and then northwest as it heads between a landfill to the west and the forested Moosic Mountains to the east, crossing into the borough of Throop. Here, the freeway has a partial cloverleaf interchange with Marshwood Road that serves Mount Cobb and Throop. US 6 curves north and then northeast as it runs between developed areas to the west and mountains to the east, heading into the borough of Olyphant and coming to the East Lackawanna Avenue exit which serves that borough. The route continues into the borough of Jessup and reaches an interchange with PA 247 that serves that borough. From here, the freeway continues through wooded area with some nearby commercial development, crossing into the borough of Archbald. Here, the route has a diamond interchange with Salem Road that serves Archbald and Cortez. The US 6 freeway curves north through forested land and enters the borough of Mayfield, reaching a diamond interchange with the eastern terminus of PA 107 that serves the borough of Jermyn and Mayfield. Past here, the route turns northeast and comes to a diamond interchange with Meredith Street that serves the city of Carbondale and Childs. The freeway continues northeast through forests as it bypasses Carbondale to the east, with a westbound scenic overlook. US 6 makes a sharp turn east and the freeway ends as it comes to an intersection with the eastern terminus of US 6 Bus. Following this, US 6 becomes two-lane undivided Roosevelt Highway, heading east across the forested Moosic Mountains.

While traversing the mountains, US 6 crosses into Wayne County and heads into the Pocono Mountains region, passing Waymart Wind Farm. After crossing the Moosic Mountains, the route passes north of State Correctional Institution – Waymart before it heads into the borough of Waymart, passing through wooded development in the northern part of the borough as a three-lane road with a center left-turn lane and crossing PA 296. East of here, the road narrows to two lanes and passes through forests with some fields and development. In the borough of Prompton, US 6 intersects the southern terminus of PA 170 and crosses the Lackawaxen River. The route continues east through rural land with some development to the north of the Lackawaxen River, reaching the borough of Honesdale. Here, the road becomes West Park Street and passes through developed areas, heading south of Wayne Memorial Hospital and coming to an intersection with PA 191. At this point, US 6 turns south for a concurrency with PA 191, following the one-way pair of Main Street eastbound and Church Street westbound across the river and through the downtown area. PA 191 splits south and US 6 follows 4th Street east across the Lackawaxen River, soon heading southeast along Willow Avenue and Grandview Avenue. The route leaves Honesdale and gains a center left-turn lane, heading east and passing near businesses as Texas Palmyra Highway. The road turns southeast and narrows to two lanes, coming to a junction with the western terminus of PA 652. US 6 winds south through forested areas with some development to the east of the Lackawaxen River and the Stourbridge Railroad. Farther south, the route reaches the borough of Hawley and becomes Hudson Street, heading southeast near development and coming to an intersection with PA 590. At this point, PA 590 turns south for a concurrency with US 6 and the two routes follow Main Avenue, crossing the river and the railroad tracks and passing through the downtown area. US 6/PA 590 turn east and become Bellemonte Avenue, heading southeast through wooded areas of development before turning southwest onto Welwood Avenue and leaving Hawley. The road passes near businesses and gains a center left-turn lane, with PA 590 splitting to the west.

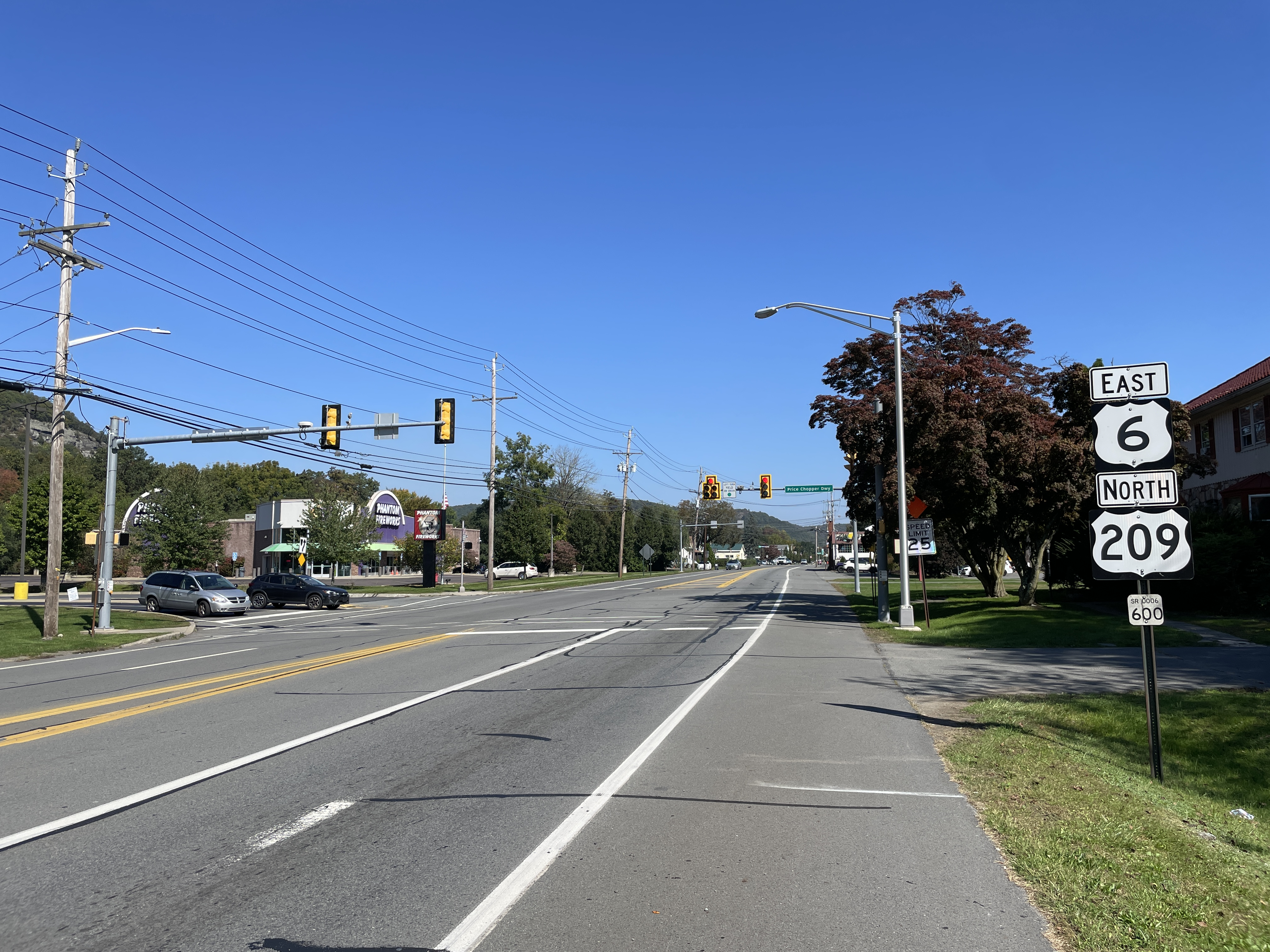
US 6 eastbound/US 209 northbound past I-84 in Matamoras

US 6 crosses Wallenpaupack Creek into Pike County and heads through wooded areas of development to the east of Lake Wallenpaupack in the community of Wilsonville as Lake Wallenpaupack Road, passing to the east of Wallenpaupack Area High School and the Lake Wallenpaupack Visitors Center. The road narrows to two lanes and reaches a junction with the northern terminus of PA 507, at which point it turns east away from the lake. The route heads east-southeast through dense forests in the northern Pocono Mountains as an unnamed road, coming to an intersection with the northern terminus of PA 402. US 6 continues east through rural land, passing through a tract of Delaware State Forest prior to coming to a junction with the northern end of PA 739. The road heads east and crosses PA 434 as it runs through more forested areas. US 6 winds east before it turns southeast, passing through more woods with some development. Farther southeast, the route comes to an interchange with I-84. The road winds southeast through more forests with occasional development prior to reaching the borough of Milford. Here, US 6 becomes West Harford Street and passes through developed areas of the borough, coming to a junction with US 209. Here, US 209 continues southeast along East Harford Street and US 6 and US 209 head northeast concurrent on Broad Street, passing through the center of Milford and heading southeast of the Pike County Courthouse. The two routes leave Milford and become an unnamed three-lane road with a center left-turn lane, passing through developed areas with some woodland to the northwest of the Delaware River. Farther northeast, the road comes closely parallel with I-84 to the northwest as it passes north of Delaware Valley High School and near more businesses. US 6/US 209 come to an interchange with I-84, where a welcome center is located, before heading into the borough of Matamoras. Here, the road becomes Pennsylvania Avenue and narrows to two lanes as it runs through developed areas of the borough. The road comes to the Mid-Delaware Bridge over the Delaware River, at which point US 6/US 209 leave Pennsylvania for New York and head into the city of Port Jervis.

=== Mile markers ===
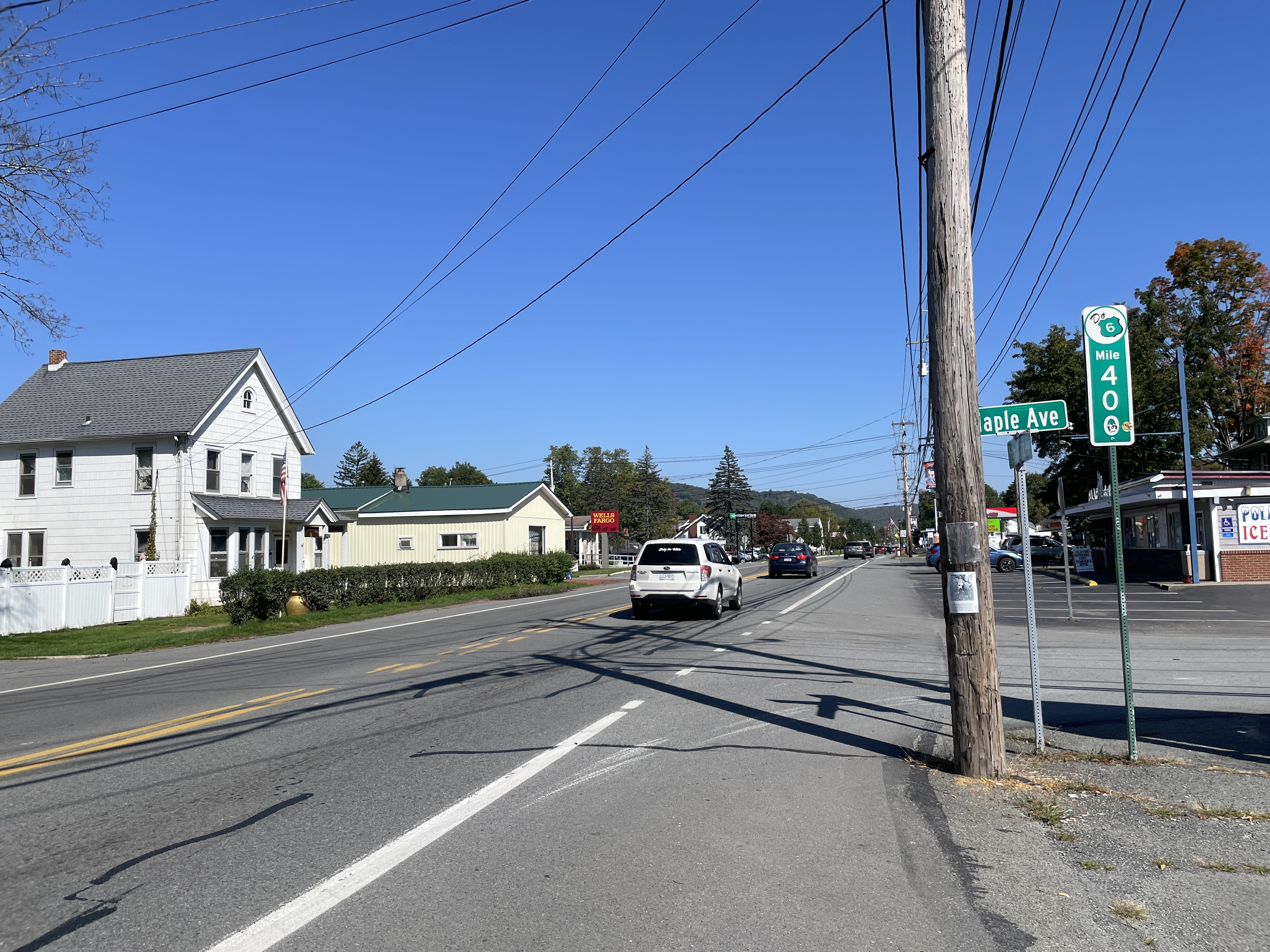
"Do 6" mile marker 400 in Matamoras

The PA Route 6 Tourist Association and the PA Route 6 Task Force developed the DO 6 Mile Marker Program, which installed "Do 6" mile markers along the entire length of US 6 in Pennsylvania, in addition to US 6N. The mile markers begin at mile marker 1 near the Ohio border and increase east to mile marker 400 near the New York border, while US 6N has mile markers 1N to 27N. They are intended to help motorists calculate distances between towns and points of interest along the highway and for businesses to use in their directions. The mile markers were funded by the Pennsylvania Department of Transportation and the Pennsylvania Department of Conservation and Natural Resources and were installed in 2008.

== History ==
As approved by the American Association of State Highway Officials (AASHO) on November 11, 1926, the west end of US 6 was at Kane, where US 120 continued west to Erie. (US 6 ended concurrent with US 219, which ran east to Mount Jewett along US 6 before turning north to New York.) US 6 also used present PA 706, US 11, and PA 106 between Wyalusing and Carbondale, while US 106 took the southerly route via Scranton.

By the end of 1927, US 6 had replaced US 120 in running west from Kane to Erie (making US 120 no longer connect to its "parent" US 20) and had swapped places with US 106 via Scranton; this took it along the Jefferson Highway. It was defined by AASHO to serve the following places in Pennsylvania: Erie, Waterford, Corry, Warren, Kane, Farmers Valley, Coudersport, Wellsboro, Canoe Camp, Mansfield, Towanda, Wyalusing, Tunkhannock, Clarks Summit, Scranton, Carbondale, Honesdale, Milford, and Matamoras. By 1930, its west end was at 26th Street (US 20) and State Street (US 6; now PA 505) in Erie. (By then, US 19 ended a block to the west on Peach Street, where it still ends today.)

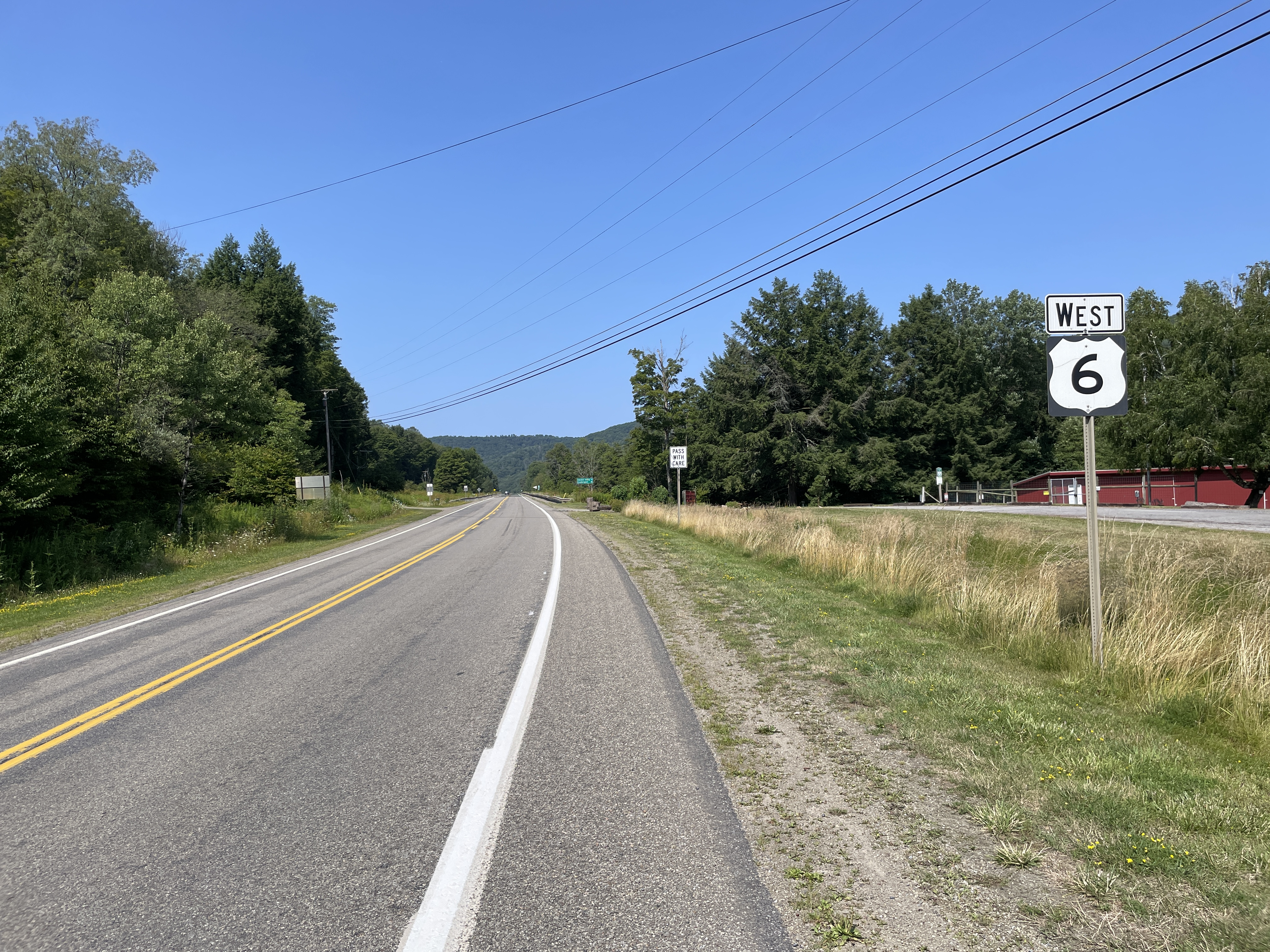
US 6 westbound past PA 449 in Ulysses Township

This original routing deviates majorly from present US 6 in the following places, roughly using the following current routes:

- PA 505 and PA 97, from Erie to Union City
- PA 46, PA 446, and PA 155, from Smethport to Port Allegany
- PA 660 and US 15 Bus. west of Mansfield
- PA 92 and PA 307, from Tunkhannock to Clarks Summit

In 1931, US 6 was extended west to Greeley, Colorado. It left its old route—which then became US 6N—at Waterford and headed south on former PA 5 and US 19 and west on US 322 and former PA 77 into Ohio. This whole section from Waterford to Cleveland, Ohio, was regarded as temporary, but the only change was a relocation by 1936 along PA 79 from Union City west to US 19 south of Waterford. (Former US 6 from Union City to Waterford became PA 97. At the same time, US 6N was moved to the rest of former PA 79 from US 19 west to US 20—its current route.)

Since then, only minor realignments and bypasses have been made to the route of US 6.

== Major intersections ==
County	Location	mi	km	Exit	Destinations	Notes
Crawford	Conneaut Township	0.0	0.0		US 6 west	Continues into Ohio
Crawford	Sadsbury Township	13.4	21.6		PA 618 north – Conneautville, Girard	Southern terminus of PA 618
Crawford	Conneaut Lake	13.9	22.4		PA 285 west – Espyville	Western end of concurrency with PA 285
Crawford	Conneaut Lake	14.3	23.0		US 322 west / PA 18 south (4th Street)	Western end of concurrencies with US 322 and PA 18
Crawford	Conneaut Lake	14.4	23.2		PA 285 east (3rd Street)	Eastern end of concurrency with PA 285
Crawford	Sadsbury Township	15.3	24.6		PA 18 north – Conneautville, Girard	Eastern end of concurrency with PA 18
Crawford	Vernon Township	19.9	32.0		US 19 south / PA 98 north (Perry Highway) – Fairview, Mercer	Roundabout; western end of concurrency with US 19, southern terminus of PA 98
Crawford	Vernon Township	21.0	33.8		I-79 – Pittsburgh, Erie	Exit 147 on I-79
Crawford	Vernon Township	21.8	35.1		PA 102 north (Pennsylvania Avenue)	Southern terminus of PA 102
Crawford	Meadville	22.8	36.7		US 322 east (Linden Street)	Eastern end of concurrency with US 322
Crawford	Saegertown	29.3	47.2		PA 198 east (State Street) – Blooming Valley	Roundabout; western end of concurrency with PA 198
Crawford	Saegertown	30.0	48.3		PA 198 west to I-79	Roundabout; eastern end of concurrency with PA 198
Crawford	Cambridge Springs	38.1	61.3		PA 86 south (Main Street) / PA 408 east (Church Street)	Northern and Western termini of PA 86/408 respectively
Crawford	Cambridge Springs	38.2	61.5		PA 99 north (McClellan Street)	Southern terminus of PA 99
Erie	LeBoeuf Township	44.2	71.1		US 6N west – Edinboro US 19 north – Erie	Eastern end of concurrency with US 19, eastern terminus of US 6N
Erie	Union City	52.9	85.1		PA 8 south (Main Street) – Titusville	Western end of concurrency with PA 8
Erie	Union City	53.5	86.1		PA 8 north (Main Street) to PA 97 – Erie, North East	Eastern end of concurrency with PA 8
Erie	Elgin–Wayne Township line	59.2	95.3		PA 89 north – North East	Western end of concurrency with PA 89
Erie	Wayne Township	60.8	97.8		PA 89 south	Eastern end of concurrency with PA 89
Erie	Corry	64.8	104.3		PA 426 (Center Street) to PA 77 west	
Warren	Columbus Township	67.6	108.8		PA 957 east (Pike Road) – Sugar Grove	Western terminus of PA 957
Warren	Pittsfield Township	77.0	123.9		PA 958 north	Southern terminus of PA 958
Warren	Pittsfield Township	82.6	132.9		PA 27 west – Titusville	Western end of concurrency with PA 27
Warren	Youngsville	85.3	137.3		PA 27 east (Main Street) – Youngsville Business District	Eastern end of concurrency with PA 27
Warren	Brokenstraw Township				Youngsville, Irvine	Interchange
Warren	Brokenstraw Township	89.1	143.4		US 62 south – Tidioute, Tionesta	Western end of concurrency with US 62, interchange
Warren	Warren	94.0	151.3		US 6 Bus. east / US 62 north (Ludlow Street) – Business District	Western terminus of US 6 BUS, eastern end of concurrency with US 62, interchange
Warren	Warren				Main Avenue	Eastbound exit and westbound entrance
Warren	Mead Township	96.9	155.9		US 6 Bus. west (Pennsylvania Avenue) – Warren	Eastern terminus of US 6 BUS
Warren	Mead Township	97.1	156.3		PA 59 east (Kinzua Road) – Kinzua Dam	Western terminus of PA 59
Warren	Sheffield Township	107.1	172.4		PA 666 west to PA 948 – Ridgway, Tionesta	Eastern terminus of PA 666
McKean	Kane	122.6	197.3		PA 66 south (Fraley Street) – Clarion	Northern terminus of PA 66
McKean	Kane	123.1	198.1		PA 321 north (Hacker Street) – Marshburg	Western end of concurrency with PA 321
McKean	Kane	123.2	198.3		PA 321 south – Wilcox	Eastern end of concurrency with PA 321
McKean	Hamlin Township	130.6	210.2		US 219 (Buffalo Pittsburgh Highway) – Bradford, Wilcox, Ridgway	
McKean	Hamlin Township	140.3	225.8		PA 146 east – Clermont	Western terminus of PA 146
McKean	Smethport	147.9	238.0		PA 59 west (Main Street) – Warren	Eastern terminus of PA 59
McKean	Smethport	148.9	239.6		PA 46 north – Eldred, Bradford, Olean	Western end of concurrency with PA 46
McKean	Keating Township	149.6	240.8		PA 46 south – Emporium	Eastern end of concurrency with PA 46
McKean	Port Allegany	157.3	253.1		PA 155 north (Main Street) – Olean	Western end of concurrency with PA 155
McKean	Port Allegany	158.5	255.1		PA 155 south – Emporium	Eastern end of concurrency with PA 155
Potter	Coudersport	174.7	281.2		PA 44 north (Main Street) – Shinglehouse	Western end of concurrency with PA 44
Potter	Coudersport	176.7	284.4		PA 872 south (Buffalo Street) – Austin	Northern terminus of PA 872
Potter	Sweden Township	178.8	287.8		PA 44 south (Cherry Springs Road) – Jersey Shore	Eastern end of concurrency with PA 44
Potter	Ulysses Township	189.3	304.6		PA 449 north (Brooklyn Road) – Brookland, Genesee	Southern terminus of PA 449
Potter	Galeton	196.9	316.9		PA 144 south (Bridge Street) – Germania, Renovo, Jersey Shore	Northern terminus of PA 144
Tioga	Gaines Township	201.5	324.3		PA 349 north (Bridge Street) – Sabinsville, Westfield	Southern terminus of PA 349
Tioga	Shippen Township	208.9	336.2		PA 362 east	Western terminus of PA 362
Tioga	Delmar Township	216.9	349.1		PA 287 north – Tioga	Western end of concurrency with PA 287
Tioga	Wellsboro	219.5	353.3		PA 287 south / PA 660 west (Main Street) – Grand Canyon	Eastern end of concurrency with PA 287, western end of concurrency with PA 660
Tioga	Charleston Township	225.8	363.4		PA 660 east – Covington	Eastern end of concurrency with PA 660
Tioga	Mansfield	231.5	372.6		I-99 / US 15 – Corning, Williamsport	Exit 182 on I-99
Tioga	Mansfield	232.2	373.7		US 15 Bus. (Main Street) – Corning, Williamsport	
Tioga	Richmond Township	234.0	376.6		PA 549 north – Roseville	Southern terminus of PA 549
Bradford	Troy	249.2	401.0		PA 14 south (Canton Street) – Canton, Williamsport	Western end of concurrency with PA 14
Bradford	Troy Township	249.9	402.2		PA 14 north – Elmira	Eastern end of concurrency with PA 14
Bradford	North Towanda Township	266.7	429.2		US 220 – Sayre, Williamsport	Interchange
Bradford	Wysox Township	272.8	439.0		PA 187 (Rome Road) – Rome, Durell	
Bradford	Wyalusing Township	280.3	451.1		PA 409 north – Camptown	Southern terminus of PA 409
Bradford	Wyalusing	285.1	458.8		PA 706 east (Church Street) – Camptown	Western terminus of PA 706
Wyoming	Braintrim Township	293.2	471.9		PA 367 north – Silvara	Southern terminus of PA 367
Wyoming	Meshoppen	300.2	483.1		PA 267 north (Auburn Street) – Lawton	Southern terminus of PA 267
Wyoming	Washington Township	303.6	488.6		PA 87 south – Mehoopany, Dushore	Northern terminus of PA 87
Wyoming	Tunkhannock Township	307.8	495.4		US 6 Bus. east – Tunkhannock	Western terminus of US 6 Bus.
Wyoming	Tunkhannock	309.6	498.3		PA 29 (Bridge Street) to US 6 Bus. – Montrose, Wilkes-Barre	
Wyoming	Tunkhannock Township	310.2	499.2		PA 92 south (Roosevelt Highway) – Pittston	Western end of concurrency with PA 92
Wyoming	Tunkhannock Township	310.4	499.5		US 6 Bus. west – Tunkhannock	Eastern terminus of US 6 BUS
Wyoming	Tunkhannock Township	312.7	503.2		PA 92 north – Nicholson	Eastern end of concurrency with PA 92
Wyoming	Clinton Township	318.7	512.9		US 11 north (Lackawanna Trail) – Nicholson, Binghamton	Western end of concurrency with US 11
Wyoming	Clinton Township–Factoryville line	319.3	513.9		PA 107 east – Lake Sheridan, Fleetville	Western terminus of PA 107
Lackawanna	La Plume Township	321.3	517.1		PA 438 east (La Plume Road)	Western terminus of PA 438
Lackawanna	Dalton	323.1	520.0		PA 632 east (Main Street) – Dalton	Western terminus of PA 632, interchange
Lackawanna	South Abington Township	328.0	527.9		PA 407 north (South Abington Road) – Clarks Green	
Lackawanna	South Abington Township			Western terminus of freeway		
Lackawanna	South Abington Township	328.2	528.2		US 11 south (Northern Boulevard) – Scranton	Eastern end of concurrency with US 11
Lackawanna	South Abington Township				I-476 Toll south / Penna Turnpike NE Extension south – Allentown	Allentown not signed eastbound; northern terminus and exit 131 on I-476 / Penna Turnpike; E-ZPass or toll-by-plate
Lackawanna	South Abington Township			194	I-81 north – Binghamton	Western end of concurrency with I-81
Lackawanna	Scranton			191	US 11 (North Scranton Expressway) / US 6 Bus. east – Dickson City	Signed as exits 191A (US 6 Bus.) and 191B (US 11); western terminus of US 6 Bus.
Lackawanna	Scranton			190	Main Avenue – Dickson City	
Lackawanna	Dunmore	334.0	537.5	188	PA 347 – Dunmore, Throop	
Lackawanna	Dunmore	335.6	540.1	187	I-81 south – Wilkes-Barre	Exit number not signed westbound; eastern end of concurrency with I-81
Lackawanna	Dunmore	335.6	540.1	187	I-84 east / I-380 south – Mt. Pocono, Milford	Western terminus of I-84; northern terminus of I-380
Lackawanna	Throop			1	Marshwood Road – Mount Cobb, Throop	
Lackawanna	Olyphant			2	East Lackawanna Avenue – Olyphant	
Lackawanna	Jessup	340.2	547.5	3	PA 247 – Jessup	
Lackawanna	Archbald			4	Salem Road – Archbald, Cortez	
Lackawanna	Archbald–Mayfield line	345.6	556.2	5	PA 107 west – Jermyn, Mayfield	Eastern terminus of PA 107
Lackawanna	Carbondale Township			6	Meredith Street – Carbondale, Childs	
Lackawanna	Carbondale Township			Eastern terminus of freeway		
Lackawanna	Carbondale Township	350.6	564.2		US 6 Bus. west (Roosevelt Highway) – Whites Crossing, Simpson, Carbondale	Eastern terminus of US 6 Bus.
Wayne	Waymart	354.3	570.2		PA 296 – Pleasant Mount, South Canaan	
Wayne	Prompton	358.5	576.9		PA 170 north – Aldenville	Southern terminus of PA 170
Wayne	Honesdale	362.8	583.9		PA 191 north (Main Street) to PA 670 – Bethany, Hancock, NY, Dyberry	Western end of concurrency with PA 191
Wayne	Honesdale	363.4	584.8		PA 191 south (Sunrise Avenue) – Lake Ariel	Eastern end of concurrency with PA 191
Wayne	Texas Township	366.2	589.3		PA 652 east – Beach Lake, Narrowsburg, NY	Western terminus of PA 652
Wayne	Hawley	371.6	598.0		PA 590 east (Hudson Street) – Rowland	Western end of concurrency with PA 590
Wayne	Palmyra Township	373.5	601.1		PA 590 west – Lakeville, Hamlin	Eastern end of concurrency with PA 590
Pike	Palmyra Township	374.9	603.3		PA 507 south – Newfoundland	Northern terminus of PA 507
Pike	Blooming Grove Township	377.4	607.4		PA 402 south to I-84 – Blooming Grove	Northern terminus of PA 402
Pike	Blooming Grove–Lackawaxen township line	380.9	613.0		PA 739 south (Valley Road) – Lords Valley, Dingmans Ferry	Northern terminus of PA 739
Pike	Blooming Grove–Lackawaxen township line	384.7	619.1		PA 434 (Shohola Road/Well Road) to I-84 – Shohola, Rowland, Greeley, Lackawaxen, Barryville, NY, Lords Valley	Western end of concurrency with PA 434
Pike	Dingman–Milford township line	395.5	636.5		I-84 – Port Jervis, Scranton	
Pike	Milford	397.7	640.0		US 209 south (Harford Street) to US 206 – Newton, Stroudsburg	Western end of concurrency with US 209
Pike	Westfall Township	402.9	648.4		I-84 – Scranton, Port Jervis	
Delaware River				Mid-Delaware Bridge		
Delaware River					US 6 east / US 209 north (Pike Street)	Continues into New York
1.000 mi = 1.609 km; 1.000 km = 0.621 mi: Concurrency terminus; Electronic toll collection

== See also ==
U.S. Route 6
Previous state: Ohio	Pennsylvania	Next state: New York
