= Pennsylvania Route 347 =

State highway in Lackawanna County, Pennsylvania, US

Pennsylvania Route 347

Route information
- Maintained by PennDOT
- Length: 10.996 mi (17.696 km)
- Existed: 1928–present

Major junctions
- South end: Green Ridge Street in Dunmore
- I-81 / US 6 in Dunmore; US 6 Bus. in Blakely; PA 632 in Scott Township
- North end: PA 524 in Scott Township

Location
- Country: United States
- State: Pennsylvania
- Counties: Lackawanna

Highway system
- Pennsylvania State Route System; Interstate; US; State; Scenic; Legislative
← PA 346	→ PA 348

Pennsylvania Route 347 (PA 347) is a 11-mile-long (18 km) state highway located in Lackawanna County, Pennsylvania. The southern terminus is at State Route 6011 (SR 6011) at Green Ridge Street in Dunmore. The northern terminus is at PA 524 in Scott Township. The route runs through suburban areas to the northeast of Scranton, serving Dunmore, Throop, Olyphant, and Blakely. From here, PA 347 heads north through rural areas of farms and woods to its northern terminus. The route has interchanges with Interstate 81 (I-81)/U.S. Route 6 (US 6) in Dunmore and US 6 Business (US 6 Bus.) in Blakely and an intersection with PA 632 in Scott Township.

The portion of the route south of Blakely became a part of US 106/PA 7/PA 19 in 1926 and US 6 in 1928 before becoming unnumbered by 1930. PA 347 was designated in 1928 between US 6 (Main Street) in Blakely and PA 147/PA 247 in Montdale. By 1930, the route was realigned to run from US 6 (Main Street) in Dickson City northwest to PA 407 in Wallsville. The south end was cut back to a realigned US 6 (now US 6 Bus.) north of Dickson City in the 1950s. In 1961, the north end was cut back to PA 632, with PA 524 replacing the east–west section running to PA 407. PA 347 was extended south to US 11/PA 307 at Blakely and Green Ridge streets in Dunmore in the 1960s. The south end was moved to SR 2020 at Drinker and Blakely streets and the north end was extended to PA 524 by 1990. In 2017 the south end was extended back to the intersection of SR 6011 at Green Ridge St.

== Route description ==
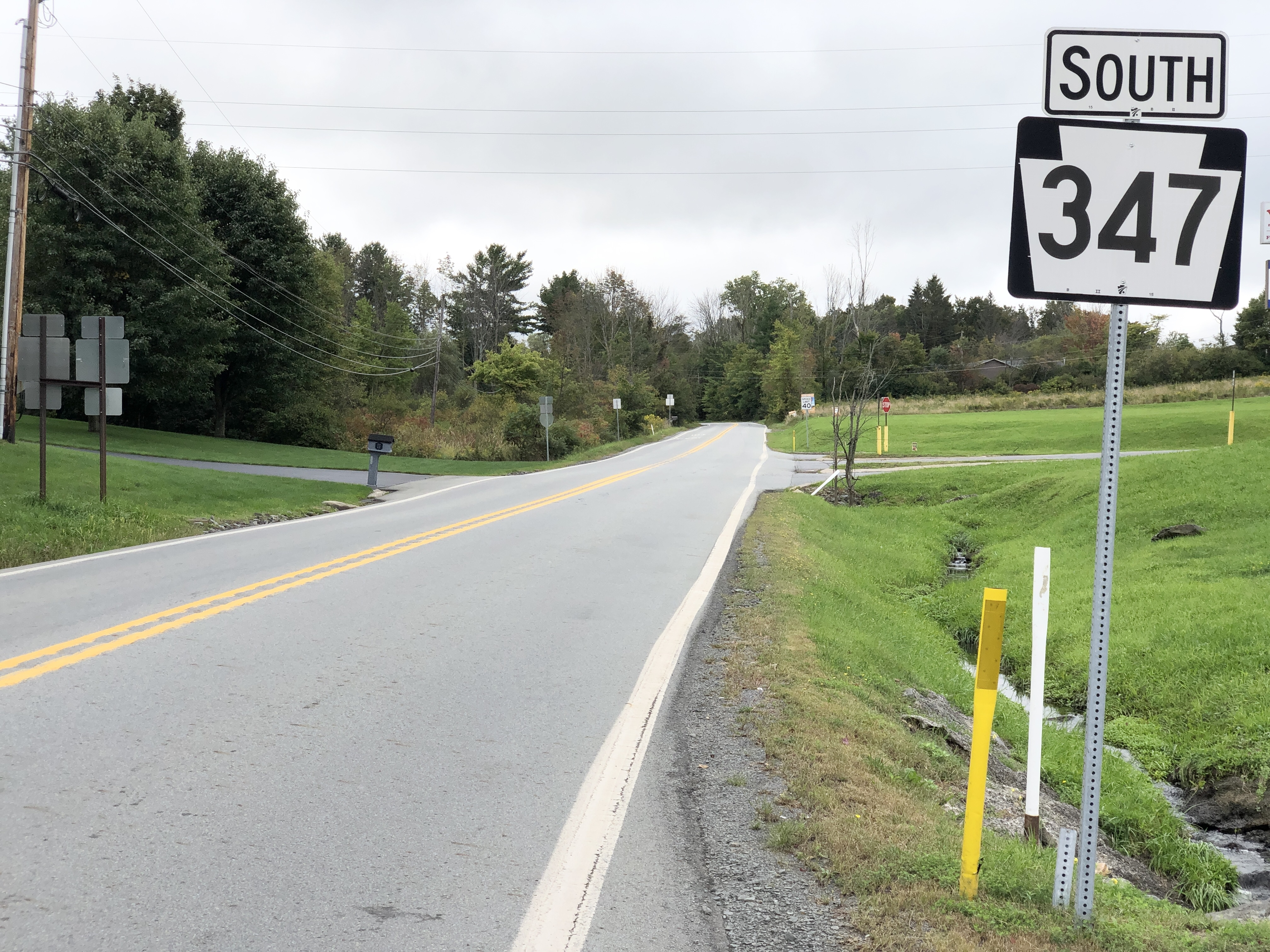
PA 347 southbound at PA 632 in Scott Township

PA 347 begins at an intersection with SR 6011 (Green Ridge Street / Blakely Street) in the borough of Dunmore, heading northeast on two-lane undivided North Blakely Street. The road heads past a few businesses before running through residential areas, widening into a four-lane divided highway as it comes to a partial cloverleaf interchange with I-81/US 6. Past this, the route becomes Oneill Highway, a five-lane road with a center left-turn lane, and runs through commercial areas, passing to the east of the Penn State Worthington Scranton campus. PA 347 crosses into the borough of Throop and splits into a one-way pair following two-lane Cypress Street northbound and two-lane Dunmore Street southbound, with the left lane serving as a left-turn lane. In this area, the road passes homes. The two directions of the route rejoin on two-lane South Valley Avenue and the route continues through residential neighborhoods. PA 347 heads into the borough of Olyphant and it passes more residences before crossing a Delaware-Lackawanna Railroad line and turning northwest onto West Lackawanna Avenue. The road heads through the commercial downtown of Olyphant before crossing the Lackawanna River, at which point it becomes the border between the borough of Blakely to the northeast and the borough of Dickson City to the southwest. The route heads through residential areas, turning west to fully enter Dickson City. Here, PA 347 turns north onto Dundaff Street and crosses into Blakely, becoming Scott Road. The road heads into wooded areas, coming to an interchange with US 6 Bus. consisting of a two-way quadrant ramp.

The route continues northwest through more woodland with some residences, entering Scott Township. PA 347 becomes Justus Boulevard and heads through rural residential areas, passing through Justus. The road heads north through a mix of farmland and woodland with some homes, running through the community of Millars School. The route intersects PA 632 and continues north through more rural areas a short distance to the east of I-81. PA 347 comes to its northern terminus at an intersection with PA 524, where the road continues north as part of that route.

== History ==
When Pennsylvania first legislated routes in 1911, what is now PA 347 between Dunmore and Blakely was designated as part of Legislative Route 6. With the creation of the U.S. Highway System in 1926, this stretch of road became a part of US 106, which was also designated concurrent with PA 7 and PA 19. At this time, the road was unpaved between Dunmore and Throop and paved between Throop and Blakely. In 1928, US 6 replaced the US 106/PA 7/PA 19 designation along the road between Dunmore and Blakely. PA 347 was designated in 1928 from US 6 (Main Street) in Blakely north to PA 147/PA 247 in Montdale along an unpaved road, following its current alignment before turning northeast along Green Grove Road to Montdale. By 1930, US 6 was shifted off the road between Dunmore and Blakely. In addition, the southern terminus of PA 347 was relocated along Dundaff Street to US 6 (Main Street) in Dickson City while the northern terminus was realigned to PA 407 in Wallsville, following its present alignment before continuing west to PA 407. The entire length of PA 347 was paved in the 1930s.

In the 1940s, US 6 was realigned to the Scranton-Carbondale Highway (now US 6 Bus.); however, the southern terminus of PA 347 remained at Main Street in Dickson City. The south end of PA 347 was cut back to US 6 by 1960. In April 1961, the northern terminus of PA 347 was truncated to PA 632, with PA 524 replacing the route between PA 407 and the current northern terminus and the section between PA 632 and PA 524 becoming unnumbered. This change was made as part of the construction of I-81 (the Penn-Can Highway). In the 1960s, PA 347 was realigned and extended south along its present alignment to US 11/PA 307 at the intersection of Blakely and Green Ridge streets in Dunmore. US 11/PA 307 was removed from the southern terminus of PA 347 in the 1980s, leaving the route terminating at an unnumbered road. The southern terminus of PA 347 was cut back to SR 2020 at the intersection of Drinker and Blakely streets by 1990. In addition, the route was extended north along its former alignment from PA 632 to PA 524. Between 2015 and 2017, a slight extension was made at PA 347's southern terminus in Dunmore shifting its end from an intersection with Drinker Street (SR 2020) to Green Ridge Street.

== Major intersections ==
The entire route is in Lackawanna County.

Location	mi	km	Destinations	Notes
Dunmore	0.000	0.000	Green Ridge Street	Southern terminus
Dunmore	0.909	1.463	I-81 / US 6 – Binghamton, Wilkes-Barre, Carbondale	Exit 188 on I-81
Blakely	5.249	8.447	US 6 Bus. – Scranton, Carbondale	Interchange
Scott Township	9.412	15.147	PA 632 (Commerce Drive) to I-81	
Scott Township	10.996	17.696	PA 524 (Hill Road / Kraky Road) to I-81	Northern terminus
1.000 mi = 1.609 km; 1.000 km = 0.621 mi
