= Pennsylvania Route 632 =

State highway in Lackawanna County, Pennsylvania, US

Pennsylvania Route 632

Route information
- Maintained by PennDOT
- Length: 7.923 mi (12.751 km)
- Existed: April 1961–present

Major junctions
- West end: US 6 / US 11 in Dalton
- PA 407 in Waverly Township; I-81 in Scott Township; PA 347 in Scott Township
- East end: PA 247 in Scott Township

Location
- Country: United States
- State: Pennsylvania
- Counties: Lackawanna

Highway system
- Pennsylvania State Route System; Interstate; US; State; Scenic; Legislative
← PA 629	→ PA 633
← PA 706	PA 707	→ PA 709

Pennsylvania Route 632 (PA 632) is a 7.92-mile-long (12.75 km) state highway located in Lackawanna County, Pennsylvania. The western terminus is at U.S. Route 6 (US 6) and US 11 in Dalton. The eastern terminus is at PA 247 in Scott Township. The route is a two-lane undivided road that runs through rural portions of northern Lackawanna County. The route has a concurrency with PA 407 in Waverly and intersects Interstate 81 (I-81) and PA 347 in Scott Township. The section of the route between US 11 in Dalton and PA 407 in Waverly was designated as PA 707 in 1930; this designation was removed in the 1940s. PA 632 was designated along its present alignment in April 1961 as part of construction of I-81 so that the latter would interchange with state highways in Lackawanna County.

== Route description ==
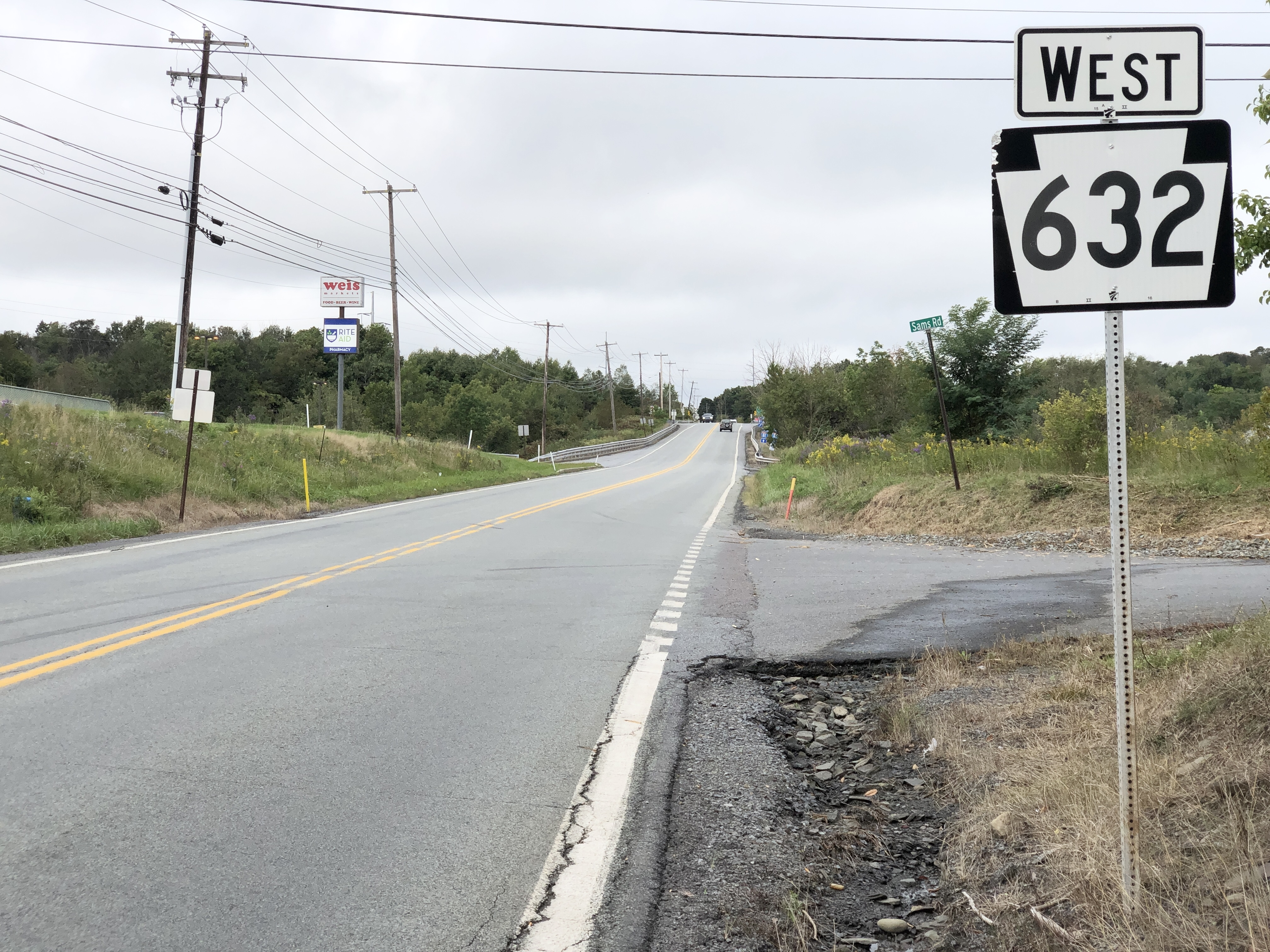
PA 632 westbound at PA 347 in Scott Township

PA 632 begins at an interchange with US 6 and US 11 (South Lackawanna Trail) in the borough of Dalton. The highway progresses eastward through Dalton as West Main Street until the intersection with Mill Street, when it changes to East Main Street. PA 632 turns to the southeast and passes along a commercial strip. After Lily Lake Road, the route changes to a residential street and soon leaves Dalton. Outside of Dalton, PA 632 retains the moniker for a short distance, crossing under the former alignment of the Delaware, Lackawanna and Western Railroad that is now Norfolk Southern's Sunbury Line. The highway becomes rural, passing a local farm until the intersection with Armstrong and Dean Roads, where the name changes to Clinton Street as the road becomes residential once again. Entering Waverly Township, PA 632 turns eastward, passing the Waverly Elementary School and through a residential strip before intersecting with PA 407 in downtown Waverly. At the intersection with PA 407, PA 632 turns northward along North Abington Road and forms a short concurrency until the intersection with Carbondale Road, where PA 632 forks to the northeast.

PA 632 heads to the northeast after leaving PA 407 and passes through a residential stretch in the northeast parts of Waverly. The route turns eastward then slowly southeastward and after an intersection with Miller Road, PA 632 becomes rural once again. The route passes a large farm and turns to the northeast and winds through rural forests for several miles until it passes a large industrial site and enters the interchange with Exit 197 of I-81. Just after the interchange with I-81, PA 632 passes through residences and intersects with PA 347. After PA 347, PA 632 heads eastward as Waverly Road until intersecting with Scott Road, where the highway turns to the southeast. Along the southeastern stretch, the highway passes numerous residences and a cemetery before entering the hamlet of Green Grove, where PA 632 becomes the primary street, before leaving for a short stretch of rural homes and then into more residences, where the highway intersects with PA 247 south of Montdale. At the intersection the PA 632 designation ends as the right-of-way becomes part of PA 247.

== History ==
Pennsylvania Route 707
- Location: Dalton – Waverly
- Existed: 1930–1940s

When Pennsylvania first legislated routes in 1911, the present-day alignment of PA 632 was not give a number. PA 707 was designated in 1930 to run from US 11 in Dalton east to PA 407 in Waverly along a paved road. The unnumbered road east of Waverly was paved in the 1930s. The PA 707 designation between Dalton and Waverly was decommissioned in the 1940s. PA 632 was created in April 1961 as part of a mass designation of state routes in Lackawanna County that created five new state highways to interchange with I-81 (the Penn-Can Highway). When designated, the route ran from US 6/US 11 in Dalton east to PA 247 south of Montdale.

== Major intersections ==
The entire route is in Lackawanna County.

Location	mi	km	Destinations	Notes
Dalton	0.000	0.000	US 6 / US 11 (South Lackawanna Trail) / SR 4017 (West Main Street)	Interchange; western terminus of PA 632
Waverly Township	1.803	2.902	PA 407 south (North Abington Road)	Southern terminus of concurrency with PA 407
Waverly Township	1.914	3.080	PA 407 north (North Abington Road)	Northern terminus of concurrency with PA 407
Scott Township	4.803	7.730	I-81 – Binghamton, Scranton	Exit 197 (I-81)
Scott Township	5.172	8.324	PA 347	
Scott Township	7.923	12.751	PA 247	Eastern terminus of PA 632
1.000 mi = 1.609 km; 1.000 km = 0.621 mi: Concurrency terminus
