= Pennsylvania Route 407 =

State highway in Pennsylvania, US

Pennsylvania Route 407

Route information
- Maintained by PennDOT
- Length: 12.470 mi (20.069 km)

Major junctions
- South end: US 6 / US 11 near Clarks Summit
- PA 632 in Waverly; PA 524 in North Abington Township; PA 438 in Wallsville; PA 107 in Fleetville
- North end: PA 374 in Lenox Township

Location
- Country: United States
- State: Pennsylvania
- Counties: Lackawanna, Susquehanna

Highway system
- Pennsylvania State Route System; Interstate; US; State; Scenic; Legislative
← PA 405	→ PA 408

Pennsylvania Route 407 (PA 407) is a 12.5-mile-long (20.1 km) state highway located in Lackawanna and Susquehanna counties in Pennsylvania. The southern terminus is at U.S. Route 6 (US 6)/US 11 in South Abington Township, Pennsylvania near Clarks Summit near the northern terminus of Interstate 476 (I-476), also known as the Pennsylvania Turnpike Northeast Extension. The northern terminus is at PA 374 near Glenwood. PA 407 is a two-lane road that serves Clarks Green and Waverly in northern Lackawanna County. This route was part of the Philadelphia and Great Bend Turnpike, a turnpike that was built in 1826. PA 407 was designated in 1928 between US 6/US 11 in Clarks Summit and PA 107 in Fleetville. The route was extended north to PA 374 in 1961. PA 407 was rerouted to its current southern terminus in 2004.

== Route description ==
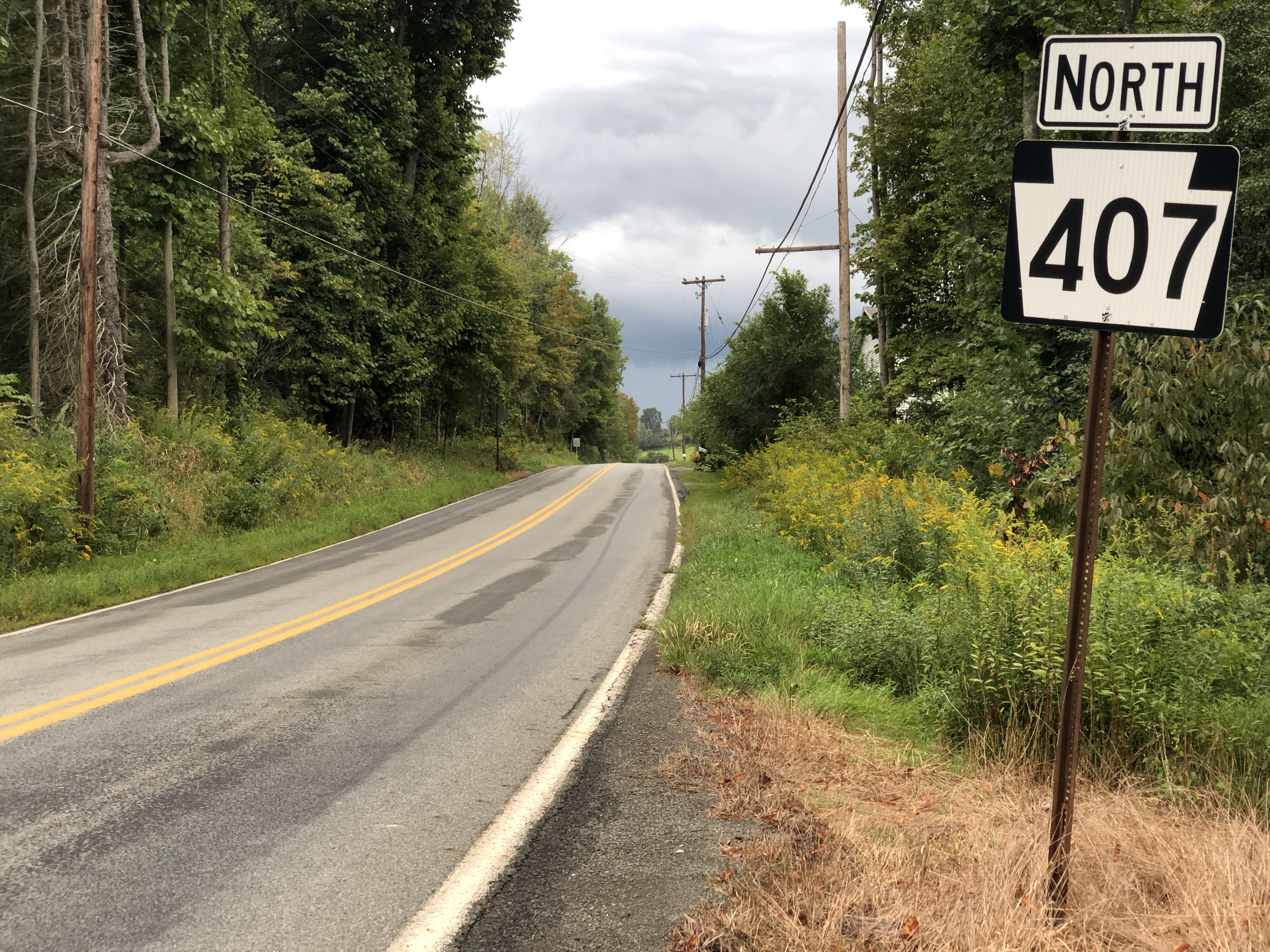
PA 407 northbound past PA 438 in Wallsville

PA 407 begins at an intersection with US 6/US 11 in South Abington Township, Lackawanna County, heading north on two-lane undivided South Abington Road. The road heads through commercial areas and woods, turning north-northwest and passing under a viaduct carrying I-476 (Pennsylvania Turnpike Northeast Extension). The route heads into residential areas, becoming the border between the borough of Clarks Summit to the west and South Abington Township to the east. PA 407 forms the border between Clarks Summit to the west and the borough of Clarks Green to the east before fully entering Clarks Green as it passes more homes, becoming North Abington Road. The road heads into Waverly Township and becomes Abington Road, heading through less dense residential areas with some woods and fields. The route heads through the community of Waverly, where it forms a short 2 block concurrency with PA 632.

PA 407 heads northeast into woodland with some fields and residences. The road enters North Abington Township and turns northwest as North Abington Road, passing through more rural areas. The route heads into forested areas of Lackawanna State Park and turns north, coming to an intersection with the western terminus of PA 524. PA 407 turns northwest and crosses Lake Lackawanna into Benton Township, turning north again and reaching a junction with PA 438 in the community of Wallsville. The road leaves the state park and heads through a mix of farmland and woodland with some homes, becoming an unnamed road and intersecting PA 107 in Fleetville. The route heads through more rural areas and passes through Kochners Corners, becoming Philadelphia-Great Bend Turnpike. PA 407 enters Lenox Township in Susquehanna County and becomes an unnamed road, crossing the East Branch Tunkhannock Creek and ending at an intersection with PA 374.

== History ==
PA 407 follows the alignment of the Philadelphia and Great Bend Turnpike, a turnpike that was built in 1826. This turnpike was chartered in 1811 and ran between Philadelphia and Great Bend. The Philadelphia and Great Bend Turnpike was built to attract settlers to rural Pennsylvania. When Pennsylvania first legislated routes in 1911, what is now PA 407 was not given a number. In 1928, PA 407 was designated to run from US 6/US 11 in Clarks Summit north to PA 107 in Fleetville. At this time, the entire length of road was paved.

PA 407 was extended north to the junction with PA 374 in 1961 as part of the construction of I-81 (the Penn-Can Highway). In 2004, PA 407 was rerouted to use South Abington Road to intersect US 6/US 11 at its current location instead of using Grove Street to intersect the routes in the center of Clarks Summit. The former alignment of PA 407 on Grove Street between Clarks Summit and Clarks Green became known as SR 4026.

== Major intersections ==
County	Location	mi	km	Destinations	Notes
Lackawanna	South Abington Township	0.000	0.000	US 6 / US 11 (Northern Boulevard) to I-81 / Penna Turnpike NE Extension	Southern terminus
Lackawanna	Waverly Township	3.403	5.477	PA 632 west (Clinton Street)	South end of PA 632 overlap
Lackawanna	Waverly Township	3.514	5.655	PA 632 east (Carbondale Road) to I-81	North end of PA 632 overlap
Lackawanna	North Abington Township	6.248	10.055	PA 524 east to I-81	
Lackawanna	Benton Township	7.391	11.895	PA 438	
Lackawanna	Benton Township	8.989	14.466	PA 107 to I-81 – Factoryville, Jermyn	
Susquehanna	Lenox Township	12.470	20.069	PA 374	Northern terminus
1.000 mi = 1.609 km; 1.000 km = 0.621 mi: Concurrency terminus
