= Waverly, Pennsylvania =

Unincorporated community in Pennsylvania, US

- Census-designated place
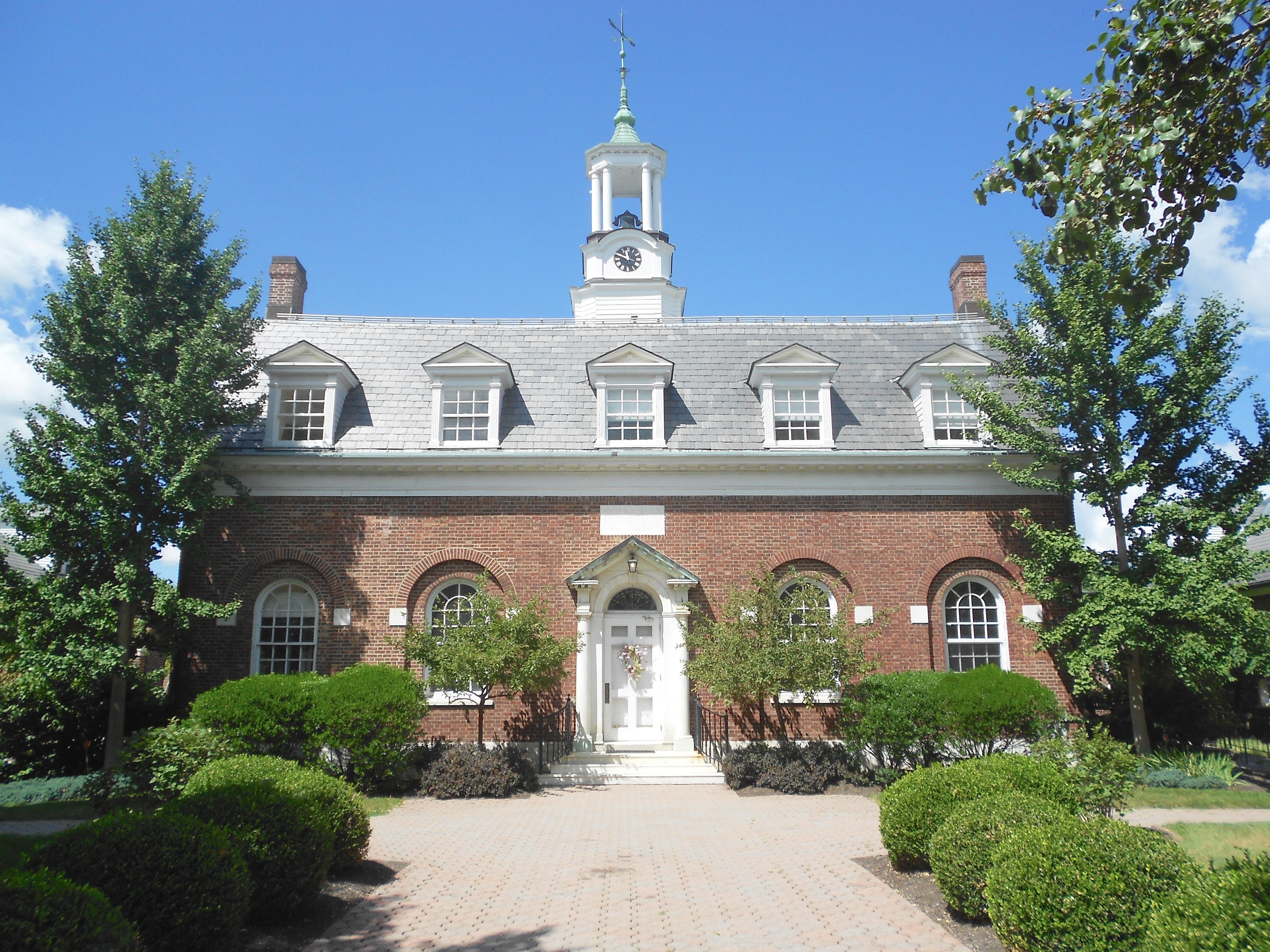
- Waverly Community House

- Location within Pennsylvania Location within the United States
- Coordinates: 41°31′35″N 75°42′19″W
- Country: United States
- State: Pennsylvania
- County: Lackawanna
- Township: Waverly

Area
  - Total: 1.57 sq mi (4.06 km^{2})
  - Land: 1.57 sq mi (4.06 km^{2})
  - Water: 0 sq mi (0.0 km^{2})
- Elevation: 1,280 ft (390 m)

Population (2024)
  - Total: 504
  - Density: 386/sq mi (148.9/km^{2})
- Time zone: UTC-5 (Eastern (EST))
  - Summer (DST): UTC-4 (EDT)
- ZIP code: 18411, 18414, 18471
- FIPS code: 42-81664
- GNIS feature ID: 2630046

Waverly is a census-designated place (CDP) comprising the central community within Waverly Township, Pennsylvania, United States. Originally called Abington Center, it was founded in the late 18th century by settlers from Connecticut, along the Warriors' Path. The population in 2024 according to World Population Review was 504, declining at a rate of -1.37% annually.

== Geography ==
Waverly is in northwestern Lackawanna County and occupies the north-central part of Waverly Township. It is bordered to the northwest by the borough of Dalton, to the west by Glenburn Township, and to the northeast by North Abington Township. Pennsylvania Route 632 passes through Waverly, as Carbondale Road to the east of the center of town and as Clinton Street to the west. PA 632 leads east 3 miles (5 km) to Interstate 81 and west 2 miles (3 km) to the center of Dalton. Pennsylvania Route 407 (North Abington Road) crosses PA 632 in the center of Waverly and leads north 5 miles (8 km) to Fleetville and south 2 miles (3 km) to Clarks Green. Scranton is 9 miles (14 km) south of Waverly.

According to the U.S. Census Bureau, the Waverly CDP has an area of 1.6 square miles (4.1 km^{2}), of which 0.82 acres (3,328 m^{2}), or 0.08%, are water. The community drains west via Ackerly Creek and other streams to the south branch of Tunkhannock Creek, which flows west to the Susquehanna River.

== History ==
The earliest settlers built cabins in Waverly around 1800. The Philadelphia and Great Bend Turnpike (now Main Street) was chartered in 1819 by the Pennsylvania Legislature along the Warriors' Path. Started in 1820, this turnpike was completed in 1824. During this time, the first three houses which were not cabins were built. In 1828, the Wayside Inn was built, and the first doctor, Andrew Bedford, set up practice and built a house which stands today on Main Street. The first general store was built in 1830, followed by a second inn and tavern in 1832. A building boom ensued during the years 1847 through 1890, during which time Waverly was a profitable small-scale industrial center. 1850 through 1880 was the heyday of Waverly's industrial era. Farmers and dairymen shipped their goods to New York City; iron foundries flourished, and numerous retail establishments, including greengrocers, bakers, a drugstore, dime store, hardware store, lumberyard, and harness shops, thrived. In 1880, the railroad was laid to the west of Waverly, and the prosperity of the town faded.

During the mid-19th century, Waverly was a stop on the Underground Railroad. Escaped slaves and freedmen found a sympathetic population in Waverly, and some settled in small houses built by a local farmer and sold to them. The freedmen also built the AME Church, which is in use today as a private residence. It is one of five churches in existence in 1872, three of which still stand and are still active congregations.

== Education ==
The school district is Abington Heights School District.

The first school was started in his log cabin in 1804 by Elder Miller, the first settler in the town. The first dedicated school was built in 1830 on the Philadelphia and Great Bend Turnpike. After it ceased being used as a school, it became a private residence for many years; the Waverly Historic Society is currently planning for its renovation and use as their headquarters. In 1844, a group of investors started the Madison Academy. This was a private school which enjoyed high regard and taught a rigorous curriculum to boys and girls. Students came from all over Pennsylvania to attend the Madison Academy; some of its graduates became judges and attorneys. The tuition ranged from $2.00 to $10.00 per quarter, depending upon the grade, and the boarding house next door charged $1.25 to $1.50 per week. Following the closing of the private school in 1878, the building was used as a public school through 1925, at which time it was razed. The Belin family donated a new school building to the town that originally served all grades. The site of that school is now occupied by a newer building, Waverly Elementary, which serves kindergarten through fourth grade and is part of the Abington Heights School District, ranked 57th in the state of Pennsylvania according to US News.

The bell from the Madison Academy hangs behind Waverly Elementary, a testament to the long tradition of academic excellence in Waverly. Although the academy was razed, the house across the street from it has a bell in its attic and is sometimes mistaken for the original Madison Academy.

== Fire in 1916 ==
In the spring of 1916, a fire devastated the four downtown blocks of Waverly; only 11 businesses remained thereafter. Of those, two buildings have operating businesses in them today: The Waverly Deli and The Waverly General Store. The front two blocks were an eyesore, although summer visitors continued to come from Scranton to Waverly. The Belin family bought the front two blocks and began design and construction of the Waverly Community House. The building was completed in 1920, and expanded to the back two blocks of the original downtown; all streets through those blocks had been removed, and the transformation of downtown to picturesque center was complete.

The Community House (commonly referred to as "The Comm") sits at the center of Waverly. The brick Dutch colonial structure currently houses the Waverly Post Office, a gymnasium with basketball court, a public playground, a preschool program and numerous recreational and educational offerings for families with young children. The Comm also plays host to an annual home and garden show, antique fair, and concerts on the lawn. Margaretta E. Belin funded construction of The Comm as a memorial to her husband, Henry Belin Jr., after his death in 1917. On June 4, 1920, the building and a portion of the land were deeded to Abington Township for the benefit of the township's residents. Wealthy summer visitors from Scranton migrated to Waverly on a permanent basis, and the town's reputation as a white-collar bedroom community was cemented.

== Notable people ==
- Bill Scranton, former governor of Pennsylvania (1963–1967)
- Mary Scranton, former First Lady of Pennsylvania (1963–1967)
