= Fleetville, Pennsylvania =

Unincorporated community in Pennsylvania, US

- Unincorporated community
- Location within Pennsylvania Location within the United States
- Coordinates: 41°35′53″N 75°42′53″W
- Country: United States
- State: Pennsylvania
- County: Lackawanna
- Township: Benton
- Elevation: 1,253 ft (382 m)
- Time zone: UTC-5 (Eastern (EST))
  - Summer (DST): UTC-4 (EDT)
- ZIP code: 18420
- Area codes: 272 & 570
- GNIS feature ID: 1174893

Fleetville is an unincorporated community in Lackawanna County, Pennsylvania, United States. The community is located at the intersection of state routes 107 and 407, 4.3 miles (6.9 km) northeast of Factoryville. Fleetville has a post office with ZIP code 18420.

The Cupillari Observatory of Keystone College is located in Fleetville.
