= Clinton Township, Wyoming County, Pennsylvania =

Township in Pennsylvania, US

Clinton Township
- Township
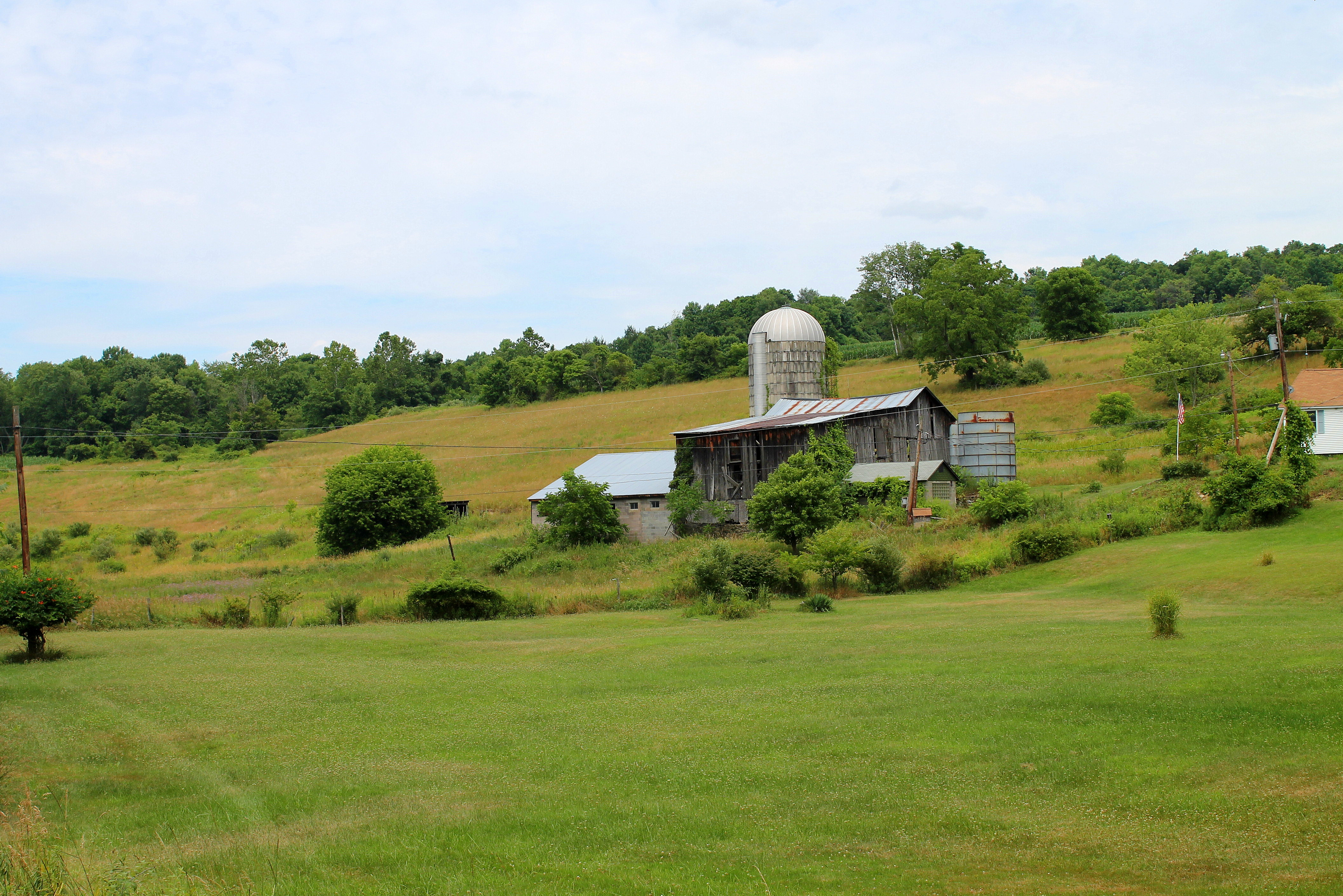
- Scenery of Lithia Valley in Clinton Township

- Location of Pennsylvania in the United States
- Coordinates: 41°35′00″N 75°49′59″W
- Country: United States
- State: Pennsylvania
- County: Wyoming

Area
  - Total: 12.33 sq mi (31.93 km^{2})
  - Land: 12.31 sq mi (31.88 km^{2})
  - Water: 0.019 sq mi (0.05 km^{2})
- Elevation: 1,063 ft (324 m)

Population (2020)
  - Total: 1,323 ▼
  - Estimate (2021): 1,319
  - Density: 103.6/sq mi (39.99/km^{2})
- Time zone: UTC-5 (EST)
  - Summer (DST): UTC-4 (EDT)
- Area code: 570
- FIPS code: 42-131-14360
- Website: clintontownshipwyo.org/wp/

Clinton Township is a township in Wyoming County, Pennsylvania, United States. The population was 1,323 at the 2020 census.

== Geography ==
According to the United States Census Bureau, the township has a total area of 12.42 square miles (32.2 km^{2}), of which 12.4 square miles (32 km^{2}) is land and 0.02 square miles (0.052 km^{2}) (0.16%) is water.

== Demographics ==
Historical population
Census	Pop.	Note	%±
2010	1,367		—
2020	1,323		−3.2%
2021 (est.)	1,319		−0.3%
U.S. Decennial Census

As of the census of 2000, there were 1,367 people, 528 households, and 385 families residing in the township. The population density was 110.2 inhabitants per square mile (42.5/km^{2}). There were 571 housing units at an average density of 46 units per square mile (18 units/km^{2}). The racial makeup of the township was 96.3% White, 0.7% African American, 0.2% Native American, 0.4% Asian, 0.3% from other races, and 2% from two or more races. Hispanic or Latino of any race were 1.7% of the population.

There were 528 households, out of which 29.5% had children under the age of 18 living with them, 60.6% were married couples living together, 8% had a female householder with no husband present, and 27.1% were non-families. 22.5% of all households were made up of individuals, and 9.5% had someone living alone who was 65 years of age or older. The average household size was 2.56 and the average family size was 3.04.

In the township the population was spread out, with 23.3% under the age of 18, 62.5% from 18 to 64, and 14.2% who were 65 years of age or older. The median age was 42.8 years.

The median income for a household in the township was $55,781, and the median income for a family was $64,653. Males had a median income of $41,607 versus $27,391 for females. The per capita income for the township was $27,607. About 6.7% of families and 7.9% of the population were below the poverty line, including 15.6% of those under age 18 and 2.9% of those age 65 or over.
