= Benton Township, Lackawanna County, Pennsylvania =

Township in Pennsylvania, US

- Township
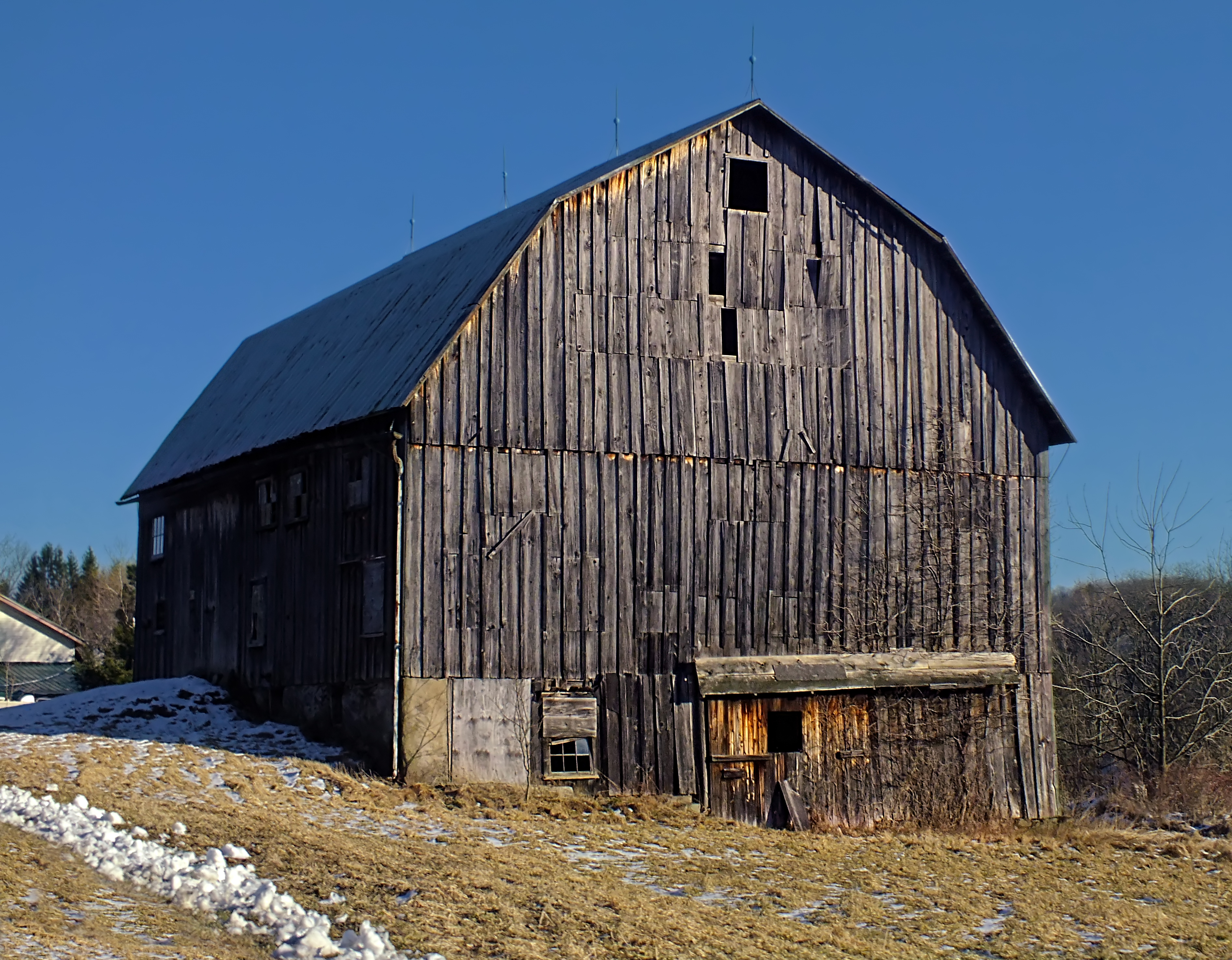
- A barn in the township

- Location of Pennsylvania in the United States
- Coordinates: 41°35′00″N 75°45′29″W
- Country: United States
- State: Pennsylvania
- County: Lackawanna

Area
  - Total: 24.97 sq mi (64.67 km^{2})
  - Land: 24.15 sq mi (62.54 km^{2})
  - Water: 0.82 sq mi (2.13 km^{2})
- Elevation: 1,148 ft (350 m)

Population (2020)
  - Total: 1,728 ▼
  - Estimate (2021): 1,721
  - Density: 77/sq mi (29.8/km^{2})
- Time zone: UTC-5 (EST)
  - Summer (DST): UTC-4 (EDT)
- Area code: 570
- FIPS code: 42-069-05696
- Website: bentontwppa.org

Benton Township is a township in Lackawanna County, Pennsylvania, United States. The population was 1,728 at the 2020 census. The village of Fleetville is in Benton Township.

== Geography ==
According to the United States Census Bureau, the township has a total area of 24.9 square miles (64 km^{2}), of which 24.3 square miles (63 km^{2}) is land and 0.6 square miles (1.6 km^{2}) (2.41%) is water.

== Demographics ==
Historical population
Census	Pop.	Note	%±
2010	1,908		—
2020	1,728		−9.4%
2021 (est.)	1,721		−0.4%
U.S. Decennial Census

As of the census of 2010, there were 1,908 people, 770 households, and 548 families residing in the township. The population density was 78.5 inhabitants per square mile (30.3/km^{2}). There were 1,060 housing units at an average density of 43.6 units per square mile (16.8 units/km^{2}). The racial makeup of the township was 98.5% White, 0.4% African American, 0.05% Native American, 0.2% Asian, 0.2% from other races, and 0.7% from two or more races. Hispanic or Latino of any race were 0.4% of the population.

There were 770 households, out of which 27.3% had children under the age of 18 living with them, 59.6% were married couples living together, 6.9% had a female householder with no husband present, and 28.8% were non-families. 24.8% of all households were made up of individuals, and 9.9% had someone living alone who was 65 years of age or older. The average household size was 2.48 and the average family size was 2.98.

In the township the population was spread out, with 20.6% under the age of 18, 63.3% from 18 to 64, and 16.1% who were 65 years of age or older. The median age was 46.9 years.

The median income for a household in the township was $59,306, and the median income for a family was $75,563. Males had a median income of $47,344 versus $33,864 for females. The per capita income for the township was $28,451. About 1.2% of families and 4.2% of the population were below the poverty line, including 3.5% of those under age 18 and 9% of those age 65 or over.
