= Abington Heights High School =

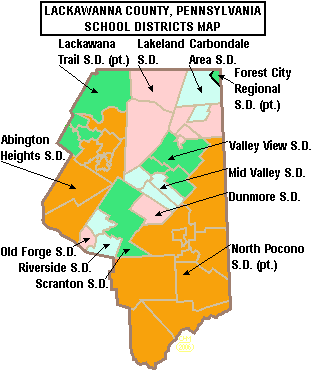
- Map of Lackawanna County, Pennsylvania School Districts with Abington Heights School District in orange in eastern Lackawanna County

Location
- 222 Noble Road; Clarks Summit, Lackawanna County, Pennsylvania 18411-1776; United States; 41.4933°N 75.7238°W

Information
- Type: Public
- Principal: Lee Ann Theony
- Staff: 72.30 (FTE)
- Grades: K–12
- Enrollment: 1,117 (2023-2024)
- Student to teacher ratio: 15.45
- Colors: Blue and white
- Nickname: Comets
- Website: ahsd.org

Abington Heights High School is a moderate-sized public high school serving the boroughs of Clarks Green and Clarks Summit and the townships of Waverly Township, Glenburn Township, Newton Township, North Abington Township, Ransom Township and South Abington Township in Lackawanna County, Pennsylvania. It is the sole high school operated by the Abington Heights School District.

In 2016, AHHS enrollment was reported as 1,047 pupils in 9th through 12th grades. The school employed 76 teachers.

The school is served by Northeastern Intermediate Unit IU19, which provides special education services, preemployment screening for future employees, inservice training and other services. The school offers its own Vocational Technical Program, where students prepare to take NOCTI Assessments.

== Extracurricular activities ==
Abington Heights High School offers a wide variety of clubs, activities and an extensive, publicly funded sports program.

=== Sports ===
The District funds:

Boys

- Baseball - AAAAA
- Basketball - AAAAA
- Cross Country - AAA
- Football - AAAAA
- Golf - AAA
- Indoor Track and Field - AAAA
- Lacrosse - AA
- Soccer - AAA
- Swimming and Diving
- Tennis - AAA
- Track and Field
- Volleyball - AA
- Wrestling - AAA

Girls

- Basketball - AAAAA
- Cross Country - AAA
- Field Hockey - AA
- Golf - AAA
- Indoor Track and Field - AAA
- Lacrosse - AA
- Soccer (Fall) - AAA
- Softball - AAAAA
- Swimming and Diving - AAA
- Girls' Tennis - AAA
- Track and Field - AAA
- Volleyball - AAA

According to PIAA directory September 2017

== Notable alumni ==
- Becky Burke, head coach of Buffalo Bulls women's basketball
- Michael Tomlin, author of "Justice in Mean Valley" and "Final Justice"
