= Waverly Township, Pennsylvania =

Township in Pennsylvania, US

Waverly Township Abington Township
- Township
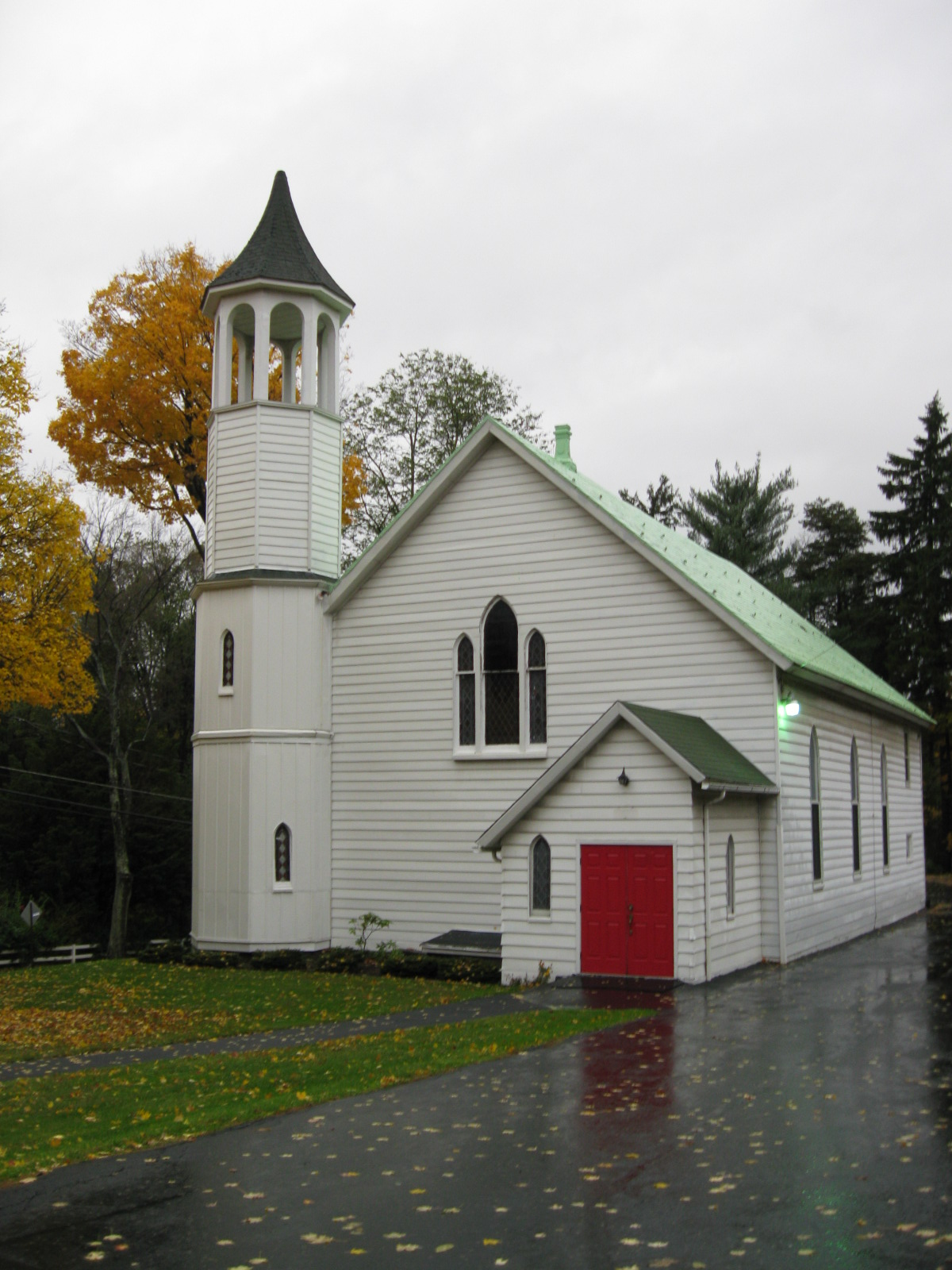
- Waverly Community Church, located on Clinton St. (PA 632)

- Location of Pennsylvania in the United States
- Coordinates: 41°31′00″N 75°41′59″W
- Country: United States
- State: Pennsylvania
- County: Lackawanna

Area
  - Total: 4.56 sq mi (11.81 km^{2})
  - Land: 4.55 sq mi (11.79 km^{2})
  - Water: 0.0077 sq mi (0.02 km^{2})
- Elevation: 1,217 ft (371 m)

Population (2020)
  - Total: 1,861 ▲
  - Estimate (2021): 1,859
  - Density: 375/sq mi (144.6/km^{2})
- Time zone: UTC-5 (EST)
  - Summer (DST): UTC-4 (EDT)
- Postal codes: 18411, 18414, 18471
- Area code: 570
- FIPS code: 42-069-81668
- Website: www.waverlytwp.com

Waverly Township is a township in Lackawanna County, Pennsylvania, United States. It is bordered by Dalton and Glenburn townships to the west, North Abington Township to the north, the boroughs of Clarks Summit and Clarks Green to the south, and South Abington Township to the south and southeast. Waverly Township is part of a suburban area known as "the Abingtons". The population was 1,861 at the 2020 census.

Prior to 2011, the township was named Abington Township, and was originally referred to as "Ebbington" in Connecticut's claim in 1806.

== History ==
Originally a village in the original Abington Township, Abington Center was founded in the late 18th century by settlers from Connecticut, along the Warriors' Path. In 1854, it was incorporated as a borough named Waverly after Sir Walter Scott's novel of the same name, popular at that time. It was renamed because there was another municipality named Abington located near Philadelphia. The borough, located within Lackawanna County, gave up its charter in 1919 due to the high cost of upgrading its main street to a state highway, and became Abington Township.

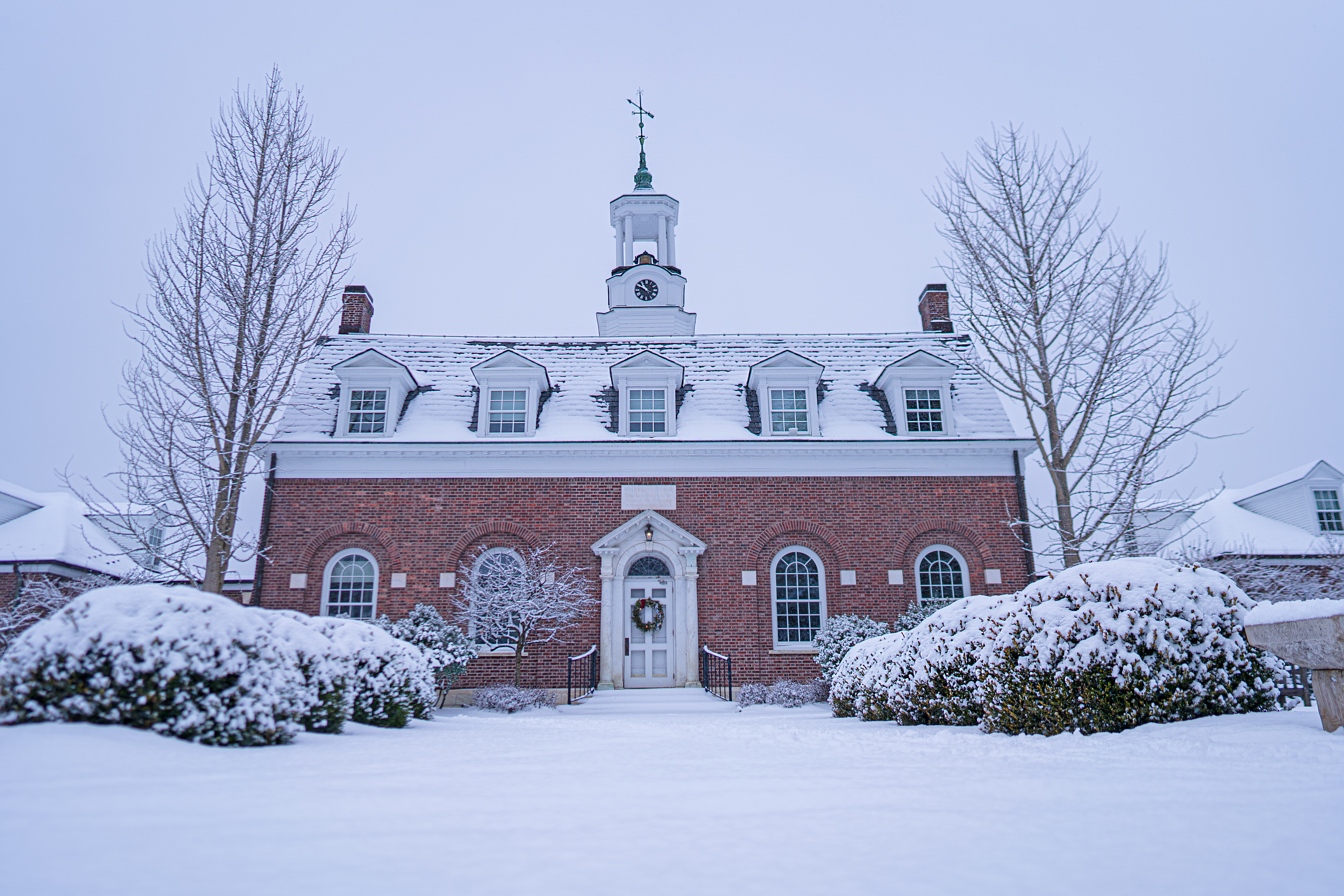
The Waverly Community House

Due to confusion between the Montgomery County township and Lackawanna County's North, South, and West Abington townships, township officials set up a ballot initiative to rename the municipality to Waverly based on one of its former names. On November 2, 2010, voters in the township overwhelmingly voted to change the township's name to Waverly Township, with 706 voting for the change and 115 against. The name change officially took place on January 1, 2011. The Waverly Historic District was added to the National Register of Historic Places in 2004.

== Geography ==
According to the United States Census Bureau, the township has a total area of 4.6 square miles (11.8 km^{2}), of which 0.01 square miles (0.02 km^{2}), or 0.17%, are water.

The central part of the township comprises the Waverly census-designated place.

== Demographics ==
Historical population
Census	Pop.	Note	%±
2010	1,743		—
2020	1,861		6.8%
2021 (est.)	1,859		−0.1%
U.S. Decennial Census

As of the census of 2010, there were 1,743 people, 639 households, and 515 families residing in the township. The population density was 378.9 inhabitants per square mile (146.3/km^{2}). There were 686 housing units at an average density of 149.1 units per square mile (57.6 units/km^{2}). The racial makeup of the township was 94.5% White, 0.2% African American, 3.8% Asian, 0.3% some other race, and 1.1% from two or more races. Hispanic or Latino of any race were 2.5% of the population.

There were 639 households, out of which 34.1% had children under the age of 18 living with them, 70.1% were married couples living together, 7.5% had a female householder with no husband present, and 19.4% were non-families. 16.3% of all households were made up of individuals, and 8.5% had someone living alone who was 65 years of age or older. The average household size was 2.72 and the average family size was 3.06.

In the township the population was spread out, with 25.8% under the age of 18, 57.2% from 18 to 64, and 17% who were 65 years of age or older. The median age was 45.9 years.

The median income for a household in the township was $122,222, and the median income for a family was $150,221. Males had a median income of $98,036 versus $43,958 for females. The per capita income for the township was $52,653. About 2.9% of families and 3.4% of the population were below the poverty line, including 1.4% of those under age 18 and 3.3% of those age 65 or over.

== Education ==
All middle school students residing in Waverly Township attend Abington Heights Middle School, and high school students attend Abington Heights High School.

== See also ==
- Waverly, Pennsylvania - A census-designated place within the township
- Abington Heights School District
