= Abington Heights School District =

Public school district in Lackawanna County, Pennsylvania

Coordinates: 41.483354°N 75.744503°W

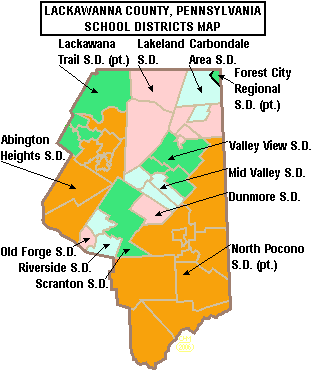
- Map of Lackawanna County, Pennsylvania School Districts with Abington Heights School District in orange in eastern Lackawanna County

Address
- 200 East Grove Street North-eastern Pennsylvania Clarks Summit, Lackawanna County, Pennsylvania, 18411-1776; United States

District information
- Type: Public
- Grades: K–12
- Schools: 6

Students and staff
- Athletic conference: PIAA District 2
- District mascot: Comet the Bear
- Colors: Blue and white

Other information
- Website: www.ahsd.org

The Abington Heights School District is a midsized public school district. It serves the boroughs of Clarks Green and Clarks Summit and the townships of Waverly Township, Glenburn Township, Newton Township, North Abington Township, Ransom Township and South Abington Township in Lackawanna County, Pennsylvania. Abington Heights School District encompasses approximately 69 square miles (180 km^{2}). According to 2000 federal census data, it served a resident population of 29,222 residents. By 2010, the District's population declined to 23,615 people. The educational attainment levels for the School District population (25 years old and over) were 94.7% high school graduates and 47.5% college graduates. The district is one of the 500 public school districts of Pennsylvania and one of twelve public school districts in Lackawanna County.

According to the Pennsylvania Budget and Policy Center, 15.5% of the District's pupils lived at 185% or below the Federal Poverty Level as shown by their eligibility for the federal free or reduced price school meal programs in 2012. In 2013, the Pennsylvania Department of Education, reported that fewer than ten students in the Abington Heights School District were homeless.

In 2009, the district residents’ per capita income was $27,768, while the median family income was $64,925. In the Commonwealth, the median family income was $49,501 and the United States median family income was $49,445, in 2010. In Lackawanna County, the median household income was $46,044. By 2013, the median household income in the United States rose to $52,100.

== Schools ==
- Clarks Summit Elementary School (K-4)
- Newton-Ransom Elementary School (K-4)
- South Abington Elementary School (K-4)
- Waverly Elementary School (K-4)
- Abington Heights Middle School (5-8) *Labeled a Don Eichhorn School to Watch in 2009, 2012, 2015
- Abington Heights High School (9-12)

Clarks Summit Elementary School covers the student population of the Clarks Summit and Clarks Green areas, while South Abington Elementary School covers mostly South Abington Township. Waverly Elementary School, located in the historic village of Waverly, covers the Waverly, Glenburn Township, and Dalton areas of the Abington Heights School District. Newton, the smallest elementary school in the district, covers the rural regions of Newton and Ransom Townships. All middle school students in the district attend Abington Heights Middle School (off Newton-Ransom Blvd. in Newton Township). Abington Heights High School is off Noble Rd. in Clarks Summit.

== History ==
The origins of the Abington Heights School District date to the founding of Clarks Summit (and later Clarks Green), the two largest boroughs in the district. Both were founded during the early 20th century and attribute their name to Captain William Clark, a revolutionary war veteran from Rhode Island. Col. Ebbings from Connecticut founded the Abington Area in the late 18th century. It was originally called "Ebbington" and later changed to "Abington." Waverly was one of the earliest villages of the Abingtons and later came the establishment of Bailey Hollow (presently called Dalton) in the 19th century and Clarks Summit and Clarks Green in the early 20th century.

The first high school in the Abingtons was built in 1875, and was called "Abington High School." In 1883, it was struck by lightning and burned to the ground. Another high school in the Abingtons, the Dalton High School, was completed in 1887 and closed down in 1930. The Abington Heights School District was formed in the early 1950s from four former school districts: Clarks Summit-Abington, Glenburn, South Abington, and Newton-Ransom. Abington Heights High School was completed in 1967. Over the next several decades, renovations and changes were made. Today there are six schools in the district along with one administration building.

The mascot for Abington Heights is Comet, while the colors are blue and white. The Comet comes from the original Clarks Summit High School Comets, prior to the establishment of Abington Heights.

== Extracurriculars ==
Abington Heights School District offers a variety of clubs, activities and sports.

Abington Heights School District has been identified two separate times as one of the top 100 places to live in America for quality music education according to a nationwide survey of public and private school programs. The High School Orchestra and Chorus enjoy a strong regional and state reputation and a strong student interest.

=== Athletics ===
Abington Heights is a PIAA District 2 school district which actively participates in the following sports:

Boys' Athletics	Girls' Athletics
Baseball	Softball
Basketball	Basketball
Cross Country	Cross Country
Football	Field Hockey
Golf	Golf
Powerlifting	Powerlifting
Soccer	Soccer
Tennis	Tennis
Winter Track and Field	Winter Track and Field
Spring Track and Field	Spring Track and Field
Unified Outdoor Track	Unified Outdoor Track
Volleyball	Volleyball
Wrestling	Wrestling
	Cheerleading
Swimming and Diving	Swimming and Diving
Lacrosse	Lacrosse

== Regions and constituent municipalities ==
The district is divided into three regions, which include the following municipalities: Three school board directors are elected from each region.

Region I

- Clarks Green Borough
- Clarks Summit Borough (partially in Region II)
- Glenburn Township
- North Abington Township
- Waverly Township

Region II

- Clarks Summit Borough (partially in Region I)
- Newton Township
- Ransom Township
- South Abington Township (partially in Region III)

Region III

- South Abington Township (partially in Region II)
