= Chinchilla, Pennsylvania =

Unincorporated community in Pennsylvania, US

- Census-designated place
- Location within Pennsylvania Location within the United States
- Coordinates: 41°29′9.1″N 75°39′59.3″W
- Country: United States
- State: Pennsylvania
- U.S. Congressional District: PA-10
- School Districts: Lakeland (Region III); Abington Heights (Region III)
- County: Lackawanna
- Magisterial Districts: 45-3-03; 45-3-01
- Townships: Scott; South Abington

Area
  - Total: 2.59 sq mi (6.70 km^{2})
  - Land: 2.51 sq mi (6.49 km^{2})
  - Water: 0.081 sq mi (0.21 km^{2})
- Elevation: 1,165 ft (355 m)

Population (2020)
  - Total: 1,959
  - Density: 782/sq mi (301.9/km^{2})
- Time zone: UTC-5 (Eastern (EST))
  - Summer (DST): UTC-4 (Eastern Daylight (EDT))
- ZIP code: De facto 18411 (Clarks Summit)
- Area code: 570
- GNIS feature IDs: 1198566 (village); 2628808 (CDP)
- FIPS codes: 42-13480

Chinchilla is a village and census-designated place in Scott and South Abington townships, Lackawanna County, Pennsylvania, United States. The CDP's population was 2,098 at the time of the 2010 United States Census. It was known as "Leach's Flats" until supposedly renamed by a female postmaster in the 1880 after her chinchilla-fur shawl. Chinchilla is located in the gorge of Leggetts Creek, which flows southward into the Lackawanna River on the north side of Scranton. Interstate 81, U.S. Route 6/11 and the Norfolk Southern Railroad (former Lackawanna Railroad) use the gorge between Scranton and Clarks Summit. Chinchilla has its own post office, with ZIP Code 18410.

== Demographics ==
Historical population
Census	Pop.	Note	%±
2020	1,959		—
U.S. Decennial Census

== Education ==
The school district for the South Abington Township part is Abington Heights School District. The school district for the Scott Township part is Lakeland School District.
