= North Abington Township, Lackawanna County, Pennsylvania =

Township in Pennsylvania, US

North Abington Township
- Township (Pennsylvania)
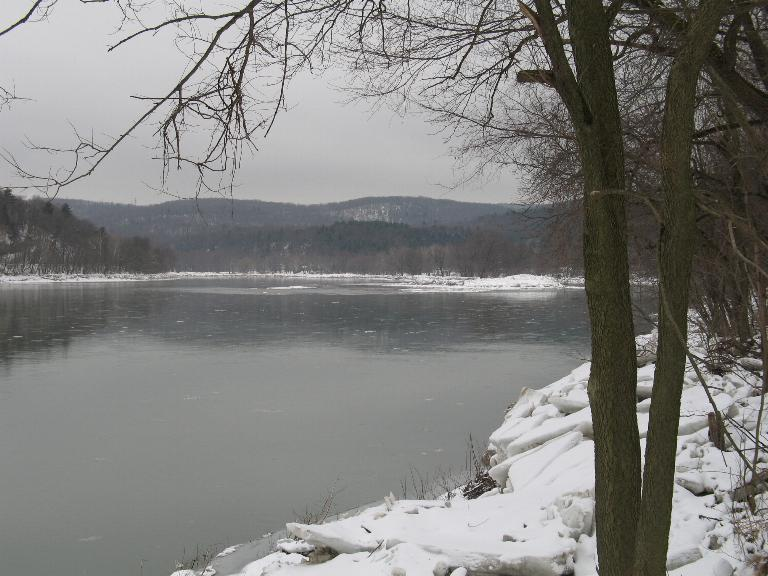
- Lackawanna State Park

- Location of Pennsylvania in the United States
- Coordinates: 41°33′00″N 75°41′59″W
- Country: United States
- State: Pennsylvania
- County: Lackawanna

Area
  - Total: 9.30 sq mi (24.09 km^{2})
  - Land: 9.12 sq mi (23.63 km^{2})
  - Water: 0.18 sq mi (0.46 km^{2})
- Elevation: 1,171 ft (357 m)

Population (2020)
  - Total: 709 ▲
  - Estimate (2021): 717
  - Density: 74.2/sq mi (28.65/km^{2})
- Time zone: UTC-5 (EST)
  - Summer (DST): UTC-4 (EDT)
- Zip Code: 18414
- Area code: 570
- FIPS code: 42-069-54680
- Website: http://www.northabingtontownship.org/

North Abington Township is a township in Lackawanna County, Pennsylvania, United States. It is located approximately 10 miles (16 km) north of Scranton, Pennsylvania, and is located in the suburban area known as “the Abingtons". North Abington is also approximately 6 miles (10 km) north of Clarks Summit and borders Waverly Township and Dalton Borough to the south, as well as Benton Township to the north. The population was 709 at the 2020 census.

== Geography ==
According to the United States Census Bureau, the township has a total area of 9.3 square miles (23.8 km^{2}), with negligible water.

== Demographics ==
Historical population
Census	Pop.	Note	%±
2010	703		—
2020	709		0.9%
2021 (est.)	717		1.1%
U.S. Decennial Census

As of the census of 2010, there were 703 people, 251 households, and 193 families residing in the township. The population density was 75.6 inhabitants per square mile (29.2/km^{2}). There were 280 housing units at an average density of 30.1 per square mile (11.6/km^{2}). The racial makeup of the township was 96.2% White, 0.3% African American, 0.6% Native American, 1.6% Asian, 0.4% from other races, and 1% from two or more races. Hispanic or Latino of any race were 1.8% of the population.

There were 251 households, out of which 38.2% had children under the age of 18 living with them, 69.7% were married couples living together, 4.4% had a female householder with no husband present, and 23.1% were non-families. 19.1% of all households were made up of individuals, and 6.8% had someone living alone who was 65 years of age or older. The average household size was 2.80 and the average family size was 3.23.

In the township the population was spread out, with 26.5% under the age of 18, 61.3% from 18 to 64, and 12.2% who were 65 years of age or older. The median age was 42.3 years.

The median income for a household in the township was $83,750, and the median income for a family was $105,313. Males had a median income of $63,750 versus $43,750 for females. The per capita income for the township was $38,892. About 1% of families and 2.6% of the population were below the poverty line, including 2.6% of those under age 18 and none of those age 65 or over.

== Education ==
There are currently no public schools within the boundaries of North Abington. All students residing in North Abington attend schools in the Abington Heights School District. Elementary students attend Waverly Elementary School, middle school students at Abington Heights Middle School, and high school students at Abington Heights High School.

== Parks ==
North Abington is home to part of Lackawanna State Park, which also stretches into Benton Township. Lackawanna State Park is a place for hiking, fishing, camping, hunting, swimming, boating, and bicycling.
