= Glenburn, Pennsylvania =

Unincorporated community in Pennsylvania, US

- Census-designated place
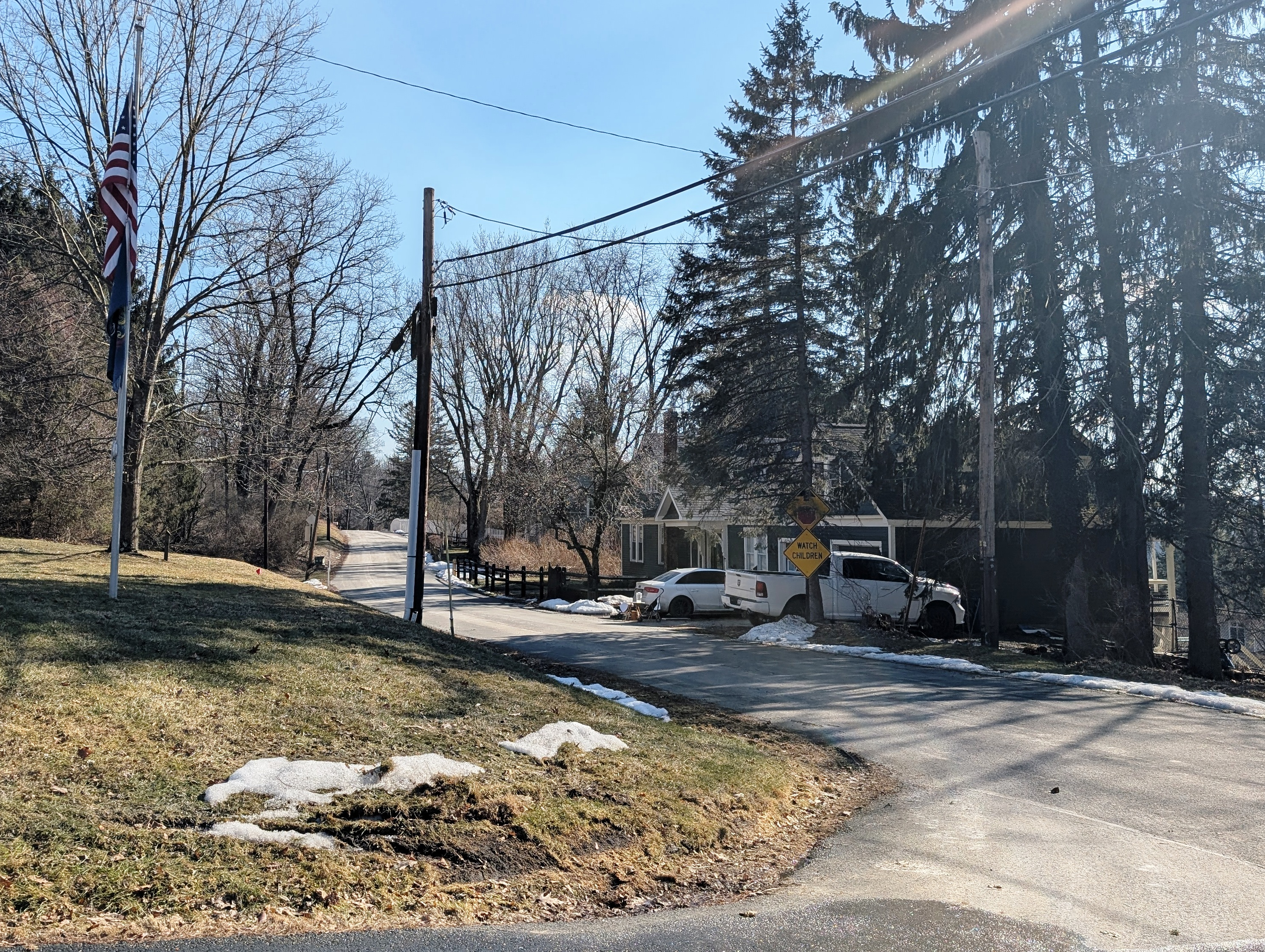
- Waterford Road southbound in Glenburn

- Location in Pennsylvania Location in the United States
- Coordinates: 41°30′58″N 75°43′27″W
- Country: United States
- State: Pennsylvania
- County: Lackawanna
- Township: Glenburn

Area
  - Total: 1.80 sq mi (4.66 km^{2})
  - Land: 1.75 sq mi (4.54 km^{2})
  - Water: 0.046 sq mi (0.12 km^{2})
- Elevation: 1,165 ft (355 m)

Population (2020)
  - Total: 1,148
  - Density: 654.9/sq mi (252.84/km^{2})
- Time zone: UTC-5 (EST)
  - Summer (DST): UTC-4 (EDT)
- ZIP Code: 18411
- Area code: 570
- FIPS code: 42-29496

Glenburn is a census-designated place (CDP) in Glenburn Township, Lackawanna County, Pennsylvania, United States. The population was 953 at the 2010 census. It is approximately 10 miles (16 km) north of downtown Scranton, in the growing suburban area known as the "Abingtons". Glenburn is located north of Clarks Summit and south of Dalton.

== Geography ==
Glenburn is located at 41°30′58″N 75°43′27″W (41.516361, -75.724286). Originally part of the Lackawanna Railroad, the combined U.S. Route 6/11 (Lackawanna Trail) runs through the community as a four-lane divided highway, leading south to Scranton and north 5 miles (8 km) to Factoryville.

According to the United States Census Bureau, the CDP has a total area of 1.79 square miles (4.6 km^{2}), of which 1.75 square miles (4.5 km^{2}) are land and 0.04 square miles (0.10 km^{2}), or 2.23%, are water. The community is in the valley of the South Branch of Tunkhannock Creek, a north- and west-flowing tributary of the Susquehanna River.

== Demographics ==
Historical population
Census	Pop.	Note	%±
2020	1,148		—
U.S. Decennial Census

As of the census of 2010, there were 953 people, 385 households, and 274 families residing in the CDP. The population density was 544.6 inhabitants per square mile (210.3/km^{2}). There were 423 housing units at an average density of 241.7 per square mile (93.3/km^{2}). The racial makeup of the CDP was 95.3% White, 0.6% African American, 0.1% Native American, 1.2% Asian, 0.2% from other races, and 2.6% from two or more races. Hispanic or Latino of any race were 2.7% of the population.

There were 385 households, out of which 28.3% had children under the age of 18 living with them, 61% were married couples living together, 6.5% had a female householder with no husband present, and 28.8% were non-families. 24.4% of all households were made up of individuals, and 10.9% had someone living alone who was 65 years of age or older. The average household size was 2.48 and the average family size was 2.97.

In the CDP, the population was spread out, with 21.1% under the age of 18, 61.3% from 18 to 64, and 17.6% who were 65 years of age or older. The median age was 47.3 years.

At the 2000 census, the median income for a household in the CDP was $44,750, and the median income for a family was $59,063. Males had a median income of $43,333 versus $30,833 for females. The per capita income for the CDP was $28,259. About 2.0% of families and 3.5% of the population were below the poverty line, including 1.3% of those under age 18 and 8.3% of those age 65 or over.

== Education ==
The school district is Abington Heights School District.

There are no public schools currently within the boundaries of the Glenburn census-designated place. Elementary students attend either Waverly Elementary or Clarks Summit Elementary schools. All middle school students attend Abington Heights Middle School and high school students at Abington Heights High School.
