= Glenburn =

Glenburn may refer to:

Towns in Australia:

- Glenburn, Victoria

Towns in Scotland:

- Glenburn, Paisley

Towns in the United States:

- Glenburn, Maine
- Glenburn, North Dakota
- Glenburn, Pennsylvania

== See also ==
- Glen
- Burn (stream)
