= Waverly Historic District (Waverly Township, Pennsylvania) =

Historic district in Pennsylvania, United States

- U.S. National Register of Historic Places
- U.S. Historic district
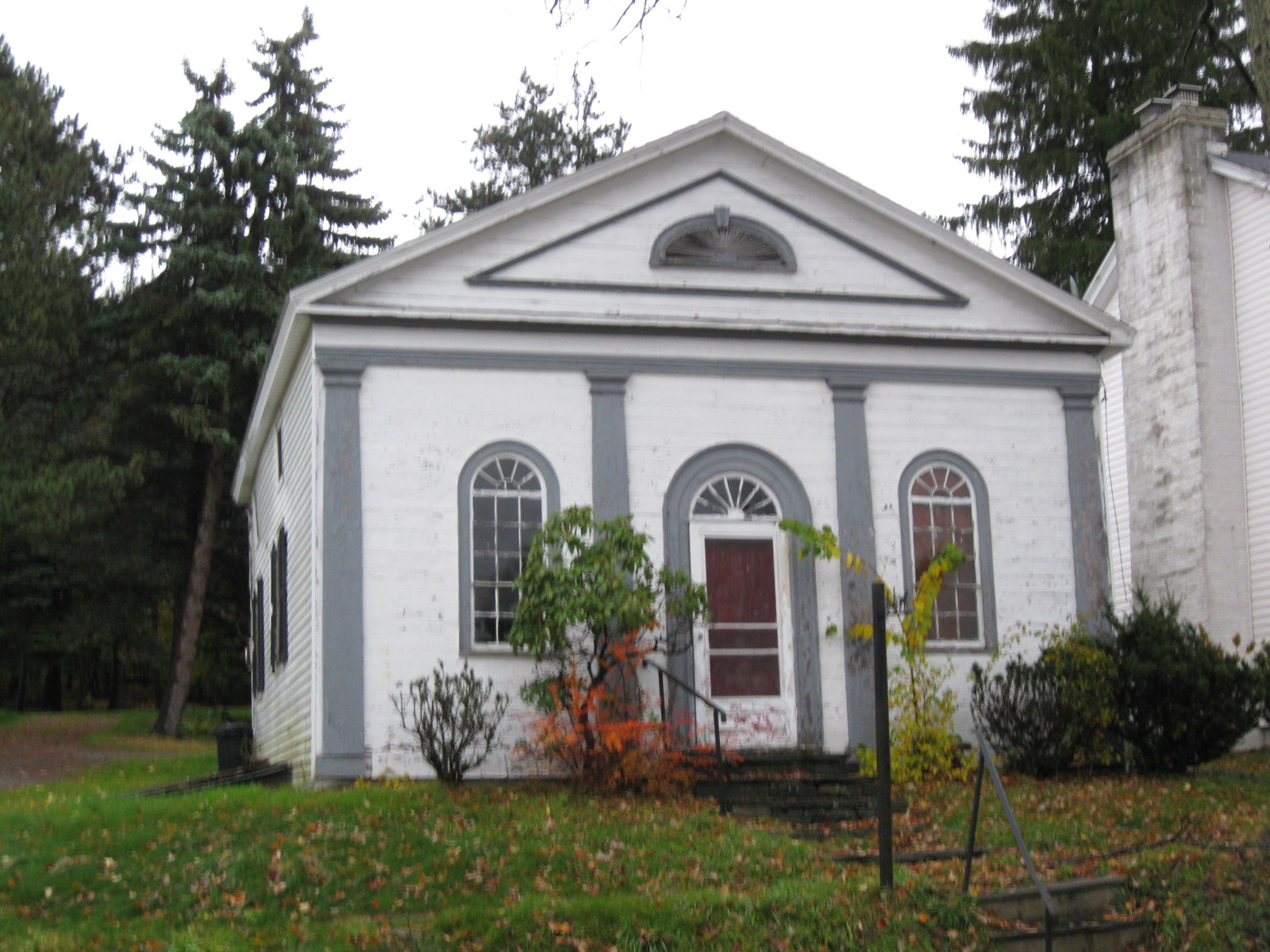
- One-room School, October 2009

- Location within Pennsylvania Location within the United States
- Location: Roughly centered on Academy St. and Abington Rd., inc. Carbondale Rd., Beech, Cole, Church and Dearborn St., Waverly Township, Pennsylvania
- Coordinates: 41°31′38″N 75°42′18″W
- Area: 77 acres (31 ha)
- Built: 1928
- Architect: Lewis, George M.D.; Ross, Ephraim
- Architectural style: Late Victorian, Late 19th And Early 20th Century American Movements
- NRHP reference No.: 04000884
- Added to NRHP: August 20, 2004

The Waverly Historic District is a national historic district that is centered roughly on Academy Street and Abington Road, and which encompasses Carbondale Road, Beech, Cole, Church and Dearborn streets in Waverly Township, Pennsylvania.

It was added to the National Register of Historic Places in 2004.

== History and architectural features ==
Historic functions of the district include domestic buildings, at least one religious structure, commerce and trade, education and recreation and culture. The district was built circa 1928, and is significant for its architecture. Architectural styles include late Victorian, late nineteenth and early twentieth-century American movements. Architects include George M.D. Lewis and Ephraim Ross.
