= Milwaukee, Pennsylvania =

Unincorporated community in Pennsylvania, US

- Unincorporated community
- Location within Pennsylvania Location within the United States
- Coordinates: 41°25′21″N 75°46′40″W
- Country: United States
- State: Pennsylvania
- County: Lackawanna
- Township: Ransom
- Elevation: 935 ft (285 m)
- Time zone: UTC-5 (Eastern (EST))
  - Summer (DST): UTC-4 (EDT)
- Area code: 570
- GNIS feature ID: 1199172

Milwaukee is an unincorporated community in Lackawanna County, Pennsylvania, United States.
