= NOCTI =

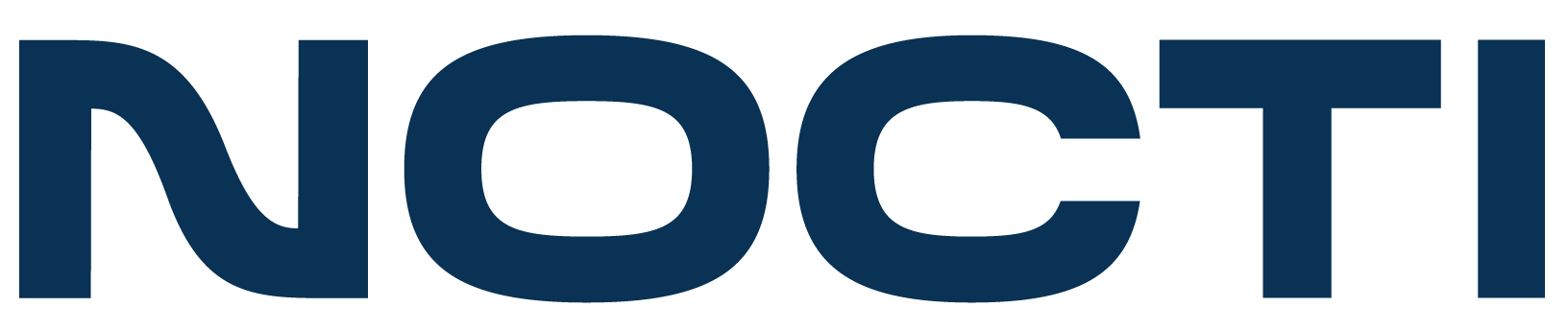
- Type: Not for profit 501(c)(3)
- Industry: Assessments; Online assessment Performance Testing
- Founded: (1966, incorporated 1973)
- Headquarters: Big Rapids, Michigan, USA
- Key people: John Foster, President & CEO
- Subsidiaries: Nocti Business Solutions
- Website: nocti.org

NOCTI (National Occupational Competency Testing Institute) delivers a battery of assessments or Standardized tests for students studying career and technical programs in high schools and technical colleges in the United States. The assessments, based on a job and task analysis process, incorporate input from subject-matter experts (SMEs) representing regions of the United States in secondary and post-secondary education as well as business and industry. The assessments are updated on a regular basis and are aligned with O*NET, national academic standards (math, science, and language arts) as well as business and industry standards. When appropriate, customized assessments may be developed to meet the educational needs of a specific region or a state. A number of the assessments are linked to industry certifications programs.

== History ==
NOCTI originated in 1966 funded by a grant from the US Commissioner of Education to Rutgers University in Newark, New Jersey. Due to the lack of vocational technical (currently referred to as career and technical) educators, a consortium of states was identified to develop assessments that would validate knowledge and skill sets of individuals coming from the workforce working toward a degree in career and technical education. NOCTI developed both written/multiple choice and performance/practical tests to assess teacher candidates. These assessments were given in a paper/pencil format at testing sites across the nation and scored at the NOCTI headquarters.

1972 NOCTI is established as a permanent organization, including a constitution, by-laws, and operating policies.
1973 NOCTI is established as a not-for-profit corporation at Educational Testing Services (ETS) in Princeton, New Jersey.
1975 NOCTI becomes independent from ETS and moves to new headquarters in Albany, New York.
1979 NOCTI expands its original mission of teacher candidate testing to secondary and post secondary student testing also
known as SOCAT (student occupational competency assessment testing)

1983 NOCTI relocates to Ferris State University in Big Rapids, Michigan.
1985 NOCTI - Industrial assessments added to NOCTI's battery of assessments.
1995 NOCTI moves to its current address at 500 N. Bronson Avenue in Big Rapids, Michigan.
1999 NOCTI - The Whitener Group is established as a wholly owned subsidiary of NOCTI to address the growing demand by business
and industry NOCTI type assessments and services.

2003 NOCTI develops online testing platform to allow secondary and post secondary testing to be completed via the Internet.
Currently both online and paper/pencil testing are available to clientele.

2006 NOCTI aligns all standardized assessments to the national academic standards for math, science and language arts.
2007 NOCTI converts all standardized assessments to Text-to-Speech technology to address assessment accommodation needs.
