= Ransom Township, Pennsylvania =

Township in Pennsylvania, US

Ransom Township
- Township
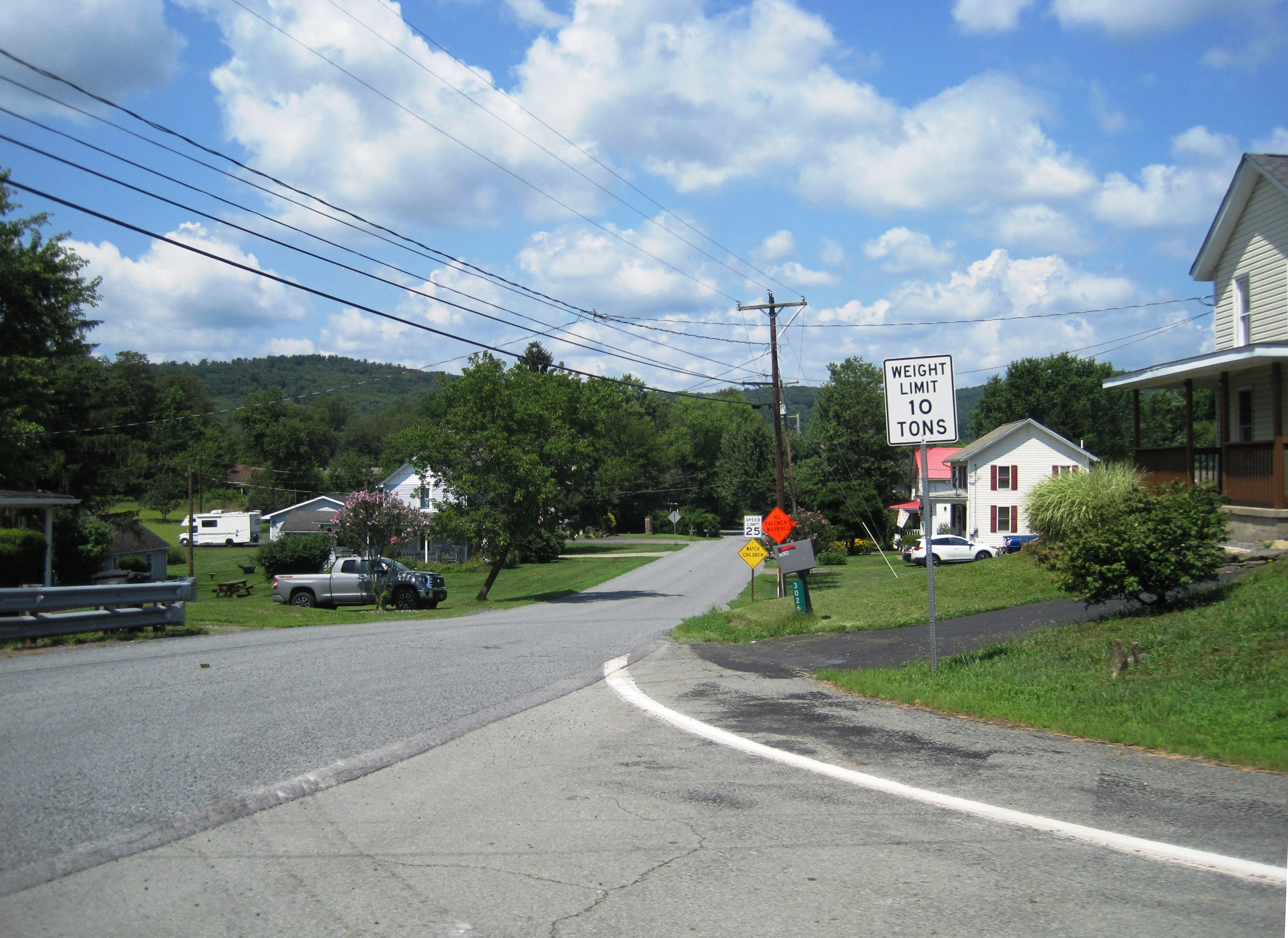
- Village of Ransom within Ransom Township

- Location of Pennsylvania in the United States
- Coordinates: 41°25′00″N 75°46′59″W
- Country: United States
- State: Pennsylvania
- County: Lackawanna
- Founded: 1849

Area
  - Total: 18.02 sq mi (46.68 km^{2})
  - Land: 17.70 sq mi (45.84 km^{2})
  - Water: 0.32 sq mi (0.84 km^{2})
- Elevation: 1,129 ft (344 m)

Population (2020)
  - Total: 1,401 ▼
  - Estimate (2021): 1,408
  - Density: 77.9/sq mi (30.06/km^{2})
- Time zone: UTC-5 (EST)
  - Summer (DST): UTC-4 (EDT)
- Postal code: 18411
- Area code: 570
- FIPS code: 42-069-63432
- Website: https://ransomtownshippa.gov/

Ransom Township is a township in Lackawanna County, Pennsylvania, United States. The population was 1,401 at the 2020 census. The township includes the village of Milwaukee.

== History ==
Ransom Township was established in Luzerne County in 1849, formed from parts of Exeter and Newton townships. The township is named for Samuel Ransom, a captain who fought and died at the nearby Battle of Wyoming. It became part of Lackawanna County when that county was formed in 1878.

== Geography ==
According to the United States Census Bureau, the township has a total area of 18.0 square miles (46.5 km^{2}), of which 17.6 square miles (45.7 km^{2}) is land and 0.3 square mile (0.9 km^{2}) (1.84%) is water.

== Demographics ==
Historical population
Census	Pop.	Note	%±
2010	1,420		—
2020	1,401		−1.3%
2021 (est.)	1,408		0.5%
U.S. Decennial Census

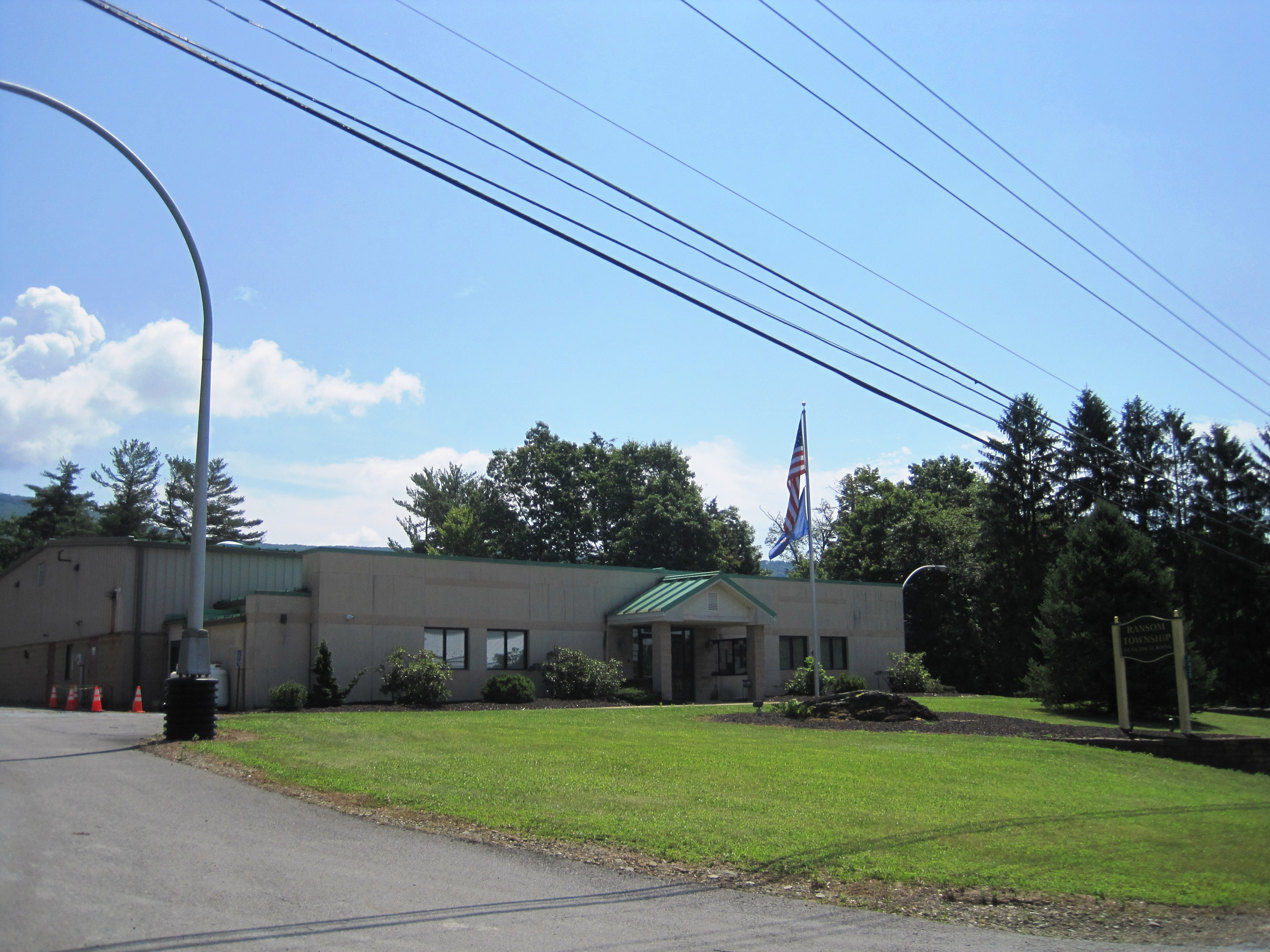
Ransom Town Hall

As of the census of 2010, there were 1,420 people, 564 households, and 421 families residing in the township. The population density was 80.7 inhabitants per square mile (31.2/km^{2}). There were 599 housing units at an average density of 34/sq mi (13.3/km^{2}). The racial makeup of the township was 97.3% White, 1.1% African American, 0.4% Asian, and 1.3% from two or more races. Hispanic or Latino of any race were 0.4% of the population.

There were 564 households, out of which 26.1% had children under the age of 18 living with them, 61.7% were married couples living together, 8.9% had a female householder with no husband present, and 25.4% were non-families. 22.7% of all households were made up of individuals, and 9.1% had someone living alone who was 65 years of age or older. The average household size was 2.52 and the average family size was 2.91.

In the township the population was spread out, with 19.4% under the age of 18, 63.7% from 18 to 64, and 16.9% who were 65 years of age or older. The median age was 45.4 years.

The median income for a household in the township was $52,448, and the median income for a family was $57,813. Males had a median income of $47,679 versus $28,150 for females. The per capita income for the township was $24,403. About 6% of families and 8.1% of the population were below the poverty line, including 9.8% of those under age 18 and 6.4% of those age 65 or over.
