= Lackawanna County, Pennsylvania =

County in Pennsylvania, United States

- County
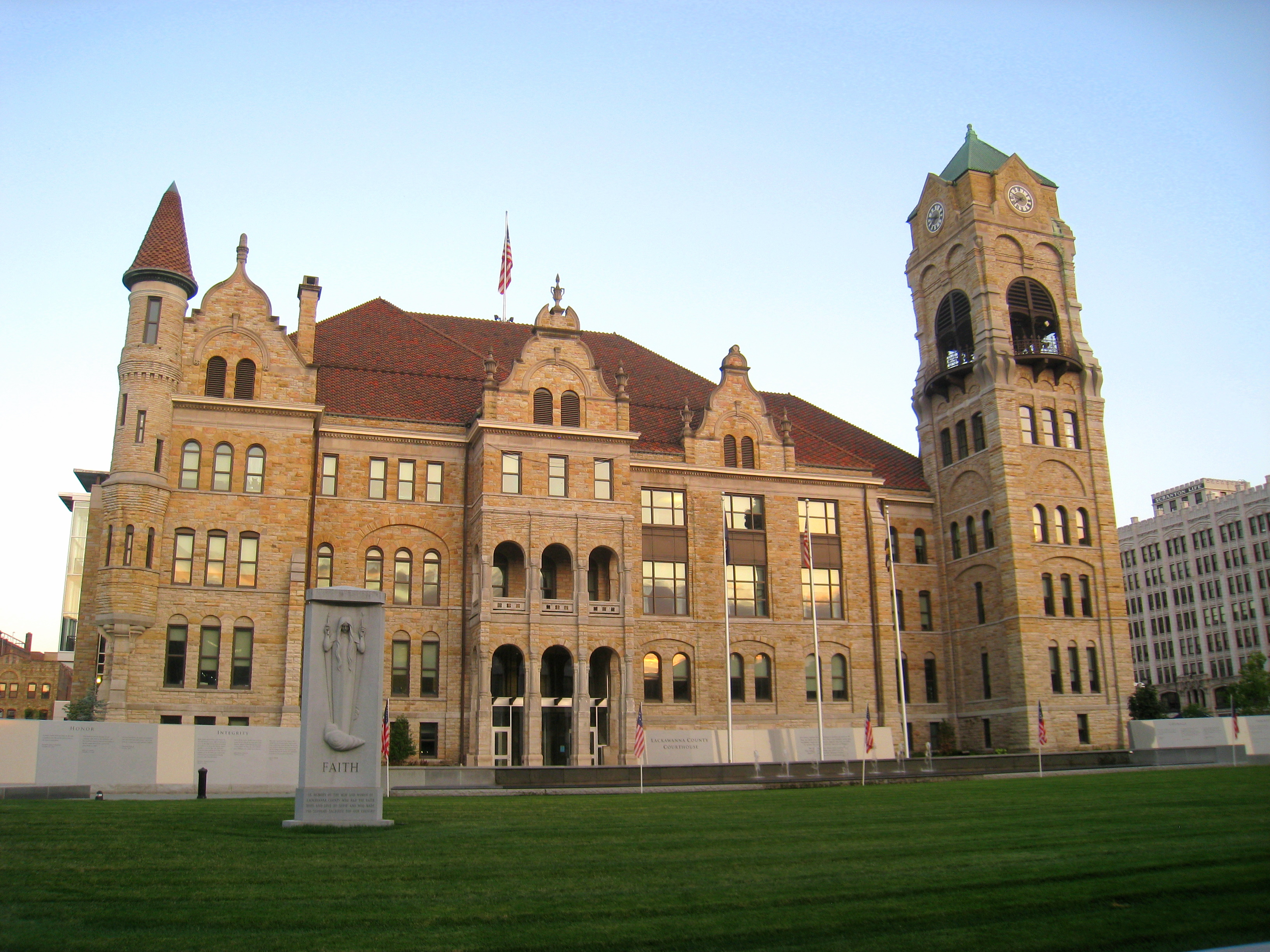
- Lackawanna County Courthouse in Scranton in August 2009

- Flag Seal

- Location within the U.S. state of Pennsylvania
- Coordinates: 41°26′N 75°37′W
- Country: United States
- State: Pennsylvania
- Founded: August 13, 1878
- Named for: Lackawanna River
- Seat: Scranton
- Largest city: Scranton

Area
  - Total: 465 sq mi (1,200 km^{2})
  - Land: 459 sq mi (1,190 km^{2})
  - Water: 5.8 sq mi (15 km^{2}) 1.3%

Population (2020)
  - Total: 215,896
  - Estimate (2025): 216,502 ▲
  - Density: 470/sq mi (182/km^{2})
- Time zone: UTC−5 (Eastern)
  - Summer (DST): UTC−4 (EDT)
- Congressional district: 8th
- Website: www.lackawannacounty.org

Lackawanna County (/ˌlækəˈwɒnə/; Unami: Lèkaohane) is a county in the Commonwealth of Pennsylvania. It had a population of 215,615 in 2022. Its county seat and most populous city is Scranton. The county is part of the Northeast region of the commonwealth. (Note: Includes Luzerne, Lackawanna, Monroe, Schuylkill, Carbon, Pike, Bradford, Wayne, Susquehanna, Wyoming and Sullivan Counties)

The county was created on August 13, 1878, following decades of trying to gain its independence from Luzerne County. Lackawanna was Pennsylvania's last county to be created, and the only county to be created after the American Civil War. It is named for the Lackawanna River.

Lackawanna County is the second-largest county in the Scranton–Wilkes-Barre–Hazleton, PA Metropolitan statistical area. It lies northwest of the Pocono Mountains approximately 40 miles (64 km) from the New Jersey border in Montague Township, and approximately 25 miles (40 km) from New York state in Kirkwood. The Lehigh River, a 109-mile-long (175 km) tributary of the Delaware River, flows through Lackawanna County.

== History ==
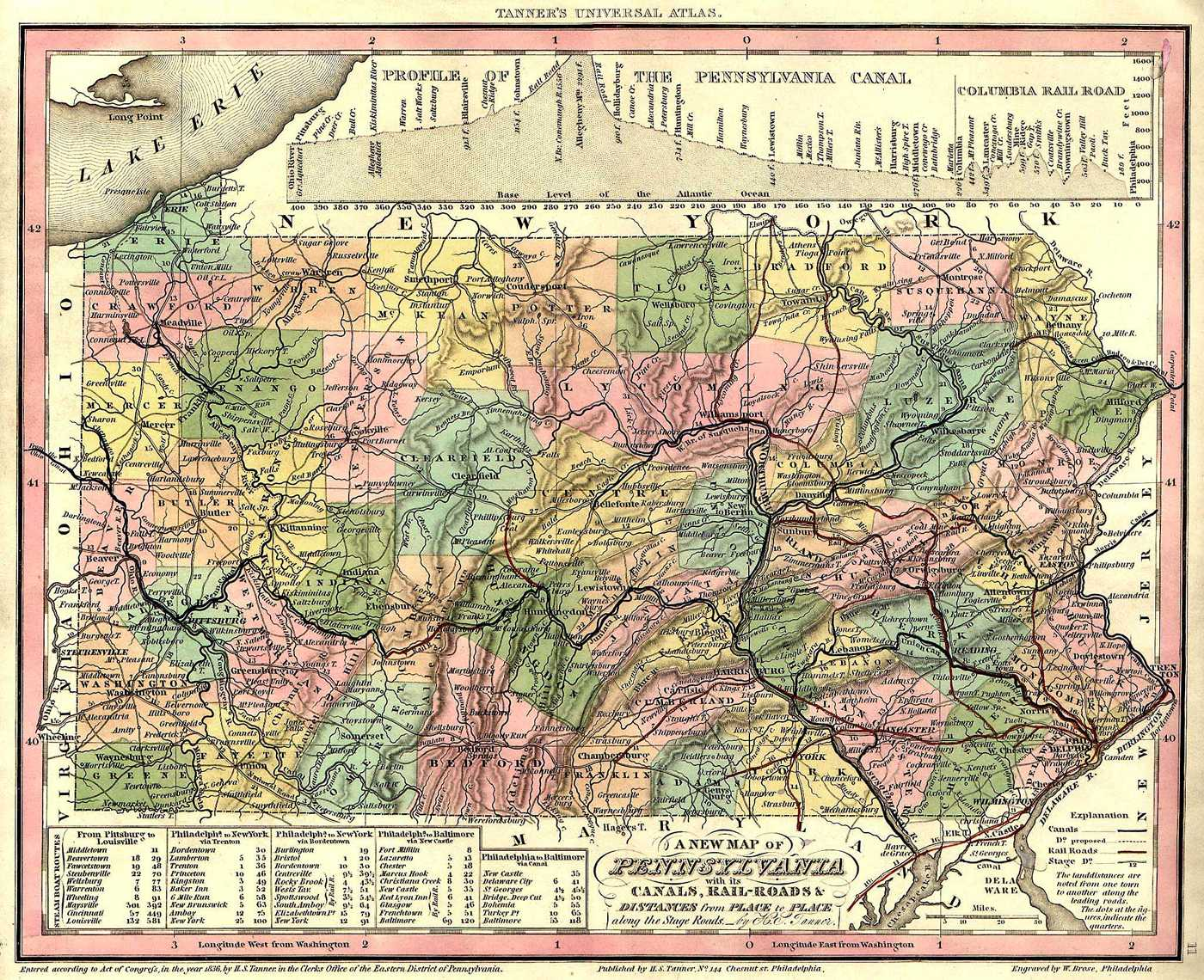
A 1836 map of Pennsylvania counties. At the time, Lackawanna was still part of Luzerne County.

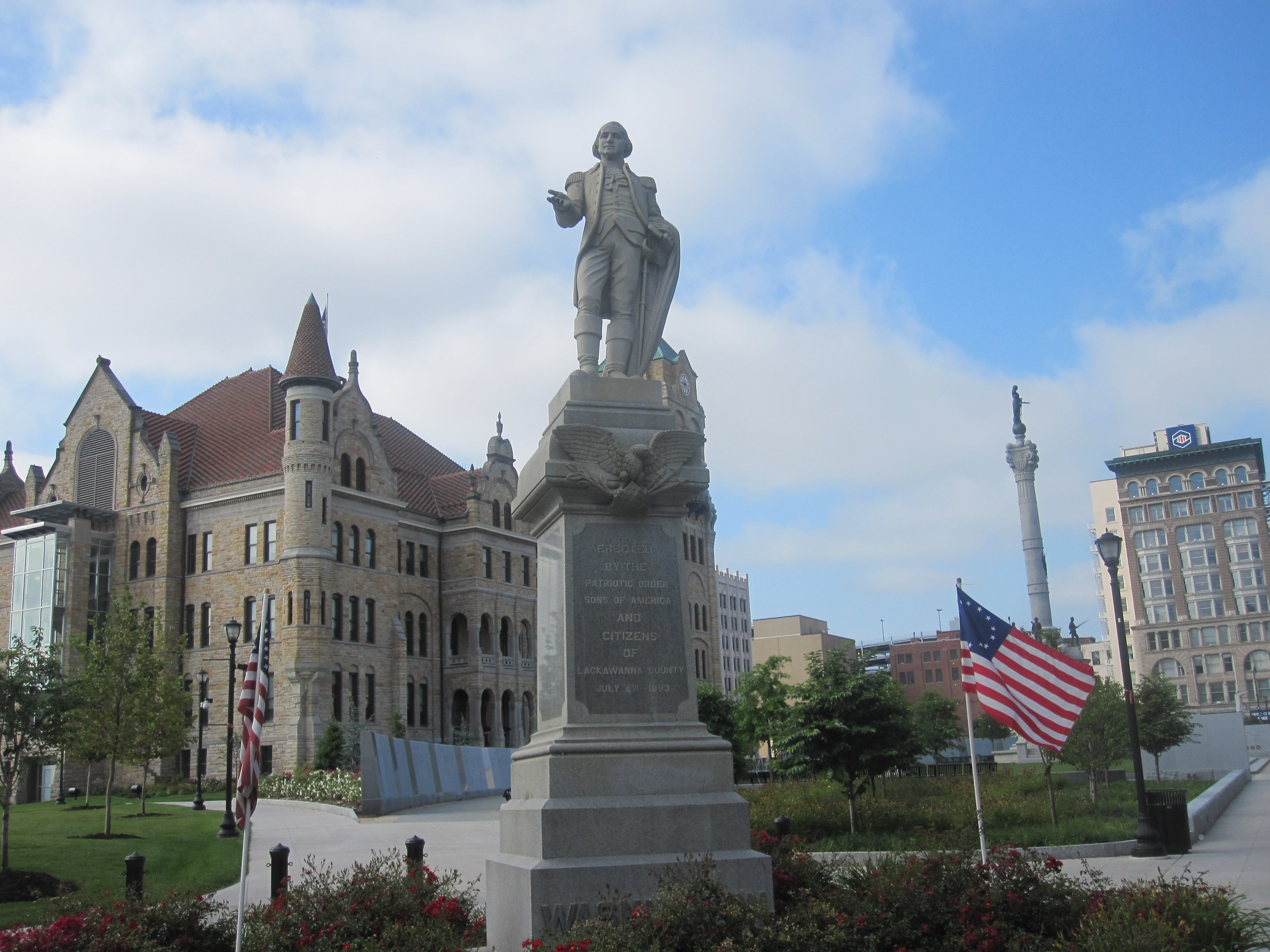
Statue of George Washington, dedicated July 4, 1893, at Lackawanna County Courthouse in Scranton

Lackawanna County is a region that was developed for iron production and anthracite coal mining in the nineteenth century, with its peak of coal production reached in the mid-20th century. Scranton, then still part of Luzerne County, became a center of mining and industry. It was the site of the Lackawanna Iron and Coal Company, which later began to produce steel using the Bessemer process. In 1877 at the time of the Scranton General Strike, the company was managed by William Walker Scranton, whose father had been president until his death in 1872. Two of his cousins had been founders of the company and the city.

The county was created on August 13, 1878, following decades of trying to gain its independence from Luzerne County. (The courts were organized in October 1878.) It is Pennsylvania's last county to be created, and the only one created after the American Civil War. It is named for the Lackawanna River.

== Geography ==
According to the U.S. Census Bureau, the county has a total area of 465 square miles (1,200 km^{2}), of which 459 square miles (1,190 km^{2}) is land and 5.8 square miles (15 km^{2}) (1.3%) is water. It has a humid continental climate which is warm-summer (Dfb) except along the Lackawanna River from Olyphant and Blakely below Peckville on down and along the Susquehanna where it is hot-summer (Dfa). Average monthly temperatures in downtown Scranton range from 26.0 °F in January to 71.9 °F in July, in Carbondale they range from 23.8 °F in January to 69.7 °F in July, and in Moscow they range from 22.6 °F in January to 68.4 °F in July.

The hardiness zone is 6a in higher northern, eastern, and southern areas and 6b in most other areas except in Old Forge, lower areas of Moosic, and Scranton along the Lackawanna River to downtown where it is 7a.

=== Adjacent counties ===
- Susquehanna County (north)
- Wayne County (east)
- Monroe County (southeast)
- Luzerne County (southwest)
- Wyoming County (west)

=== Major highways ===
- I-81
- I-84
- I-380
- I-476
- US 6
  - US 6 Bus. (Scranton)
- US 11
- PA 106
- PA 107
- PA 307
- PA 348
- PA 407
- PA 435
- PA 438
- PA 502
- PA 524

== Demographics ==
Historical population
Census	Pop.	Note	%±
1880	89,269		—
1890	142,088		59.2%
1900	193,831		36.4%
1910	259,570		33.9%
1920	286,311		10.3%
1930	310,397		8.4%
1940	301,243		−2.9%
1950	257,396		−14.6%
1960	234,531		−8.9%
1970	234,107		−0.2%
1980	227,908		−2.6%
1990	219,039		−3.9%
2000	213,295		−2.6%
2010	214,437		0.5%
2020	215,896		0.7%
2025 (est.)	216,502	▲	0.3%
U.S. Decennial Census; 1790-1960 1900-1990; 1990-2000 2010-2019

=== Racial and ethnic composition ===
Lackawanna County, Pennsylvania – Racial and ethnic composition Note: the US Census treats Hispanic/Latino as an ethnic category. This table excludes Latinos from the racial categories and assigns them to a separate category. Hispanics/Latinos may be of any race.
Race / Ethnicity (NH = Non-Hispanic)	Pop 1980	Pop 1990	Pop 2000	Pop 2010	Pop 2020	% 1980	% 1990	% 2000	% 2010	% 2020
White alone (NH)	224,939	214,817	204,560	192,250	175,246	98.70%	98.07%	95.90%	89.65%	81.17%
Black or African American alone (NH)	1,080	1,537	2,662	4,794	7,415	0.47%	0.70%	1.25%	2.24%	3.43%
Native American or Alaska Native alone (NH)	68	158	163	220	276	0.03%	0.07%	0.08%	0.10%	0.13%
Asian alone (NH)	765	1,325	1,582	3,601	6,762	0.34%	0.60%	0.74%	1.68%	3.13%
Native Hawaiian or Pacific Islander alone (NH)	x	x	18	41	28	x	x	0.01%	0.02%	0.01%
Other race alone (NH)	254	113	187	315	828	0.11%	0.05%	0.09%	0.15%	0.38%
Mixed race or Multiracial (NH)	x	x	1,165	2,534	7,074	x	x	0.55%	1.18%	3.28%
Hispanic or Latino (any race)	802	1,089	2,958	10,682	18,267	0.35%	0.50%	1.39%	4.98%	8.46%
Total	227,908	219,039	213,295	214,437	215,896	100.00%	100.00%	100.00%	100.00%	100.00%

=== 2020 census ===
As of the 2020 census, the county had a population of 215,896 and the median age was 42.6 years. 19.6% of residents were under the age of 18 and 20.7% of residents were 65 years of age or older. For every 100 females there were 95.5 males, and for every 100 females age 18 and over there were 92.8 males age 18 and over.

There were 88,745 households in the county, of which 25.9% had children under the age of 18 living in them. Of all households, 42.1% were married-couple households, 20.8% were households with a male householder and no spouse or partner present, and 29.8% were households with a female householder and no spouse or partner present. About 32.8% of all households were made up of individuals and 15.0% had someone living alone who was 65 years of age or older.

There were 99,815 housing units, of which 11.1% were vacant. Among occupied housing units, 63.0% were owner-occupied and 37.0% were renter-occupied. The homeowner vacancy rate was 1.7% and the rental vacancy rate was 8.2%.

82.4% of residents lived in urban areas, while 17.6% lived in rural areas.

As of the 2020 census, the racial makeup of the county was 82.9% White, 3.9% Black or African American, 0.3% American Indian and Alaska Native, 3.2% Asian, less than 0.1% Native Hawaiian and Pacific Islander, 3.9% from some other race, and 5.9% from two or more races; Hispanic or Latino residents of any race comprised 8.5% of the population.

=== 2010 census ===
As of the 2010 census, there were 214,437 people living in the county. 92.0% were White, 2.5% Black or African American, 1.7% Asian, 0.2% Native American, 2.0% of some other race and 1.5% of two or more races. 5.0% were Hispanic or Latino (of any race). 20.1% identified as of Italian, 19.9% Irish, 13.0% Polish and 11.4% German ancestry.

=== 2000 census ===
As of the 2000 census, there were 213,295 people, 86,218 households, and 55,783 families living in the county. The population density was 465 inhabitants per square mile (180/km^{2}). There were 95,362 housing units at an average density of 208 units per square mile (80/km^{2}). The racial makeup of the county was 96.65% White, 1.31% Black or African American, 0.09% Native American, 0.75% Asian, 0.01% Pacific Islander, 0.53% from other races, and 0.66% from two or more races. 1.39% of the population were Hispanic or Latino of any race. 22.5% were of Italian, 21.2% Irish, 15.4% Polish and 10.2% German ancestry.

There were 86,218 households, out of which 27.2% had children under the age of 18 living with them, 48.9% were married couples living together, 11.8% had a female householder with no husband present, and 35.3% were non-families; 31.3% of all households were made up of individuals, and 15.7% had someone living alone who was 65 years of age or older. The average household size was 2.38 and the average family size was 3.00.

In the county, 21.8% of the population was under the age of 18, 8.9% from 18 to 24, 26.4% from 25 to 44, 23.5% from 45 to 64, and 19.5% who were 65 years of age or older. The median age was 40 years. For every 100 females, there were 89.30 males. For every 100 females age 18 and over, there were 85.4 males.

== Politics and government ==
United States presidential election results for Lackawanna County, Pennsylvania
Year	Republican		Democratic		Third party(ies)	
Year	No.	%	No.	%	No.	%
1880	7,357	49.80%	7,178	48.59%	239	1.62%
1884	9,656	58.47%	6,171	37.37%	687	4.16%
1888	10,279	48.50%	9,858	46.51%	1,058	4.99%
1892	10,729	48.38%	10,351	46.67%	1,098	4.95%
1896	18,737	59.28%	11,869	37.55%	999	3.16%
1900	16,763	51.56%	14,728	45.30%	1,019	3.13%
1904	19,923	64.54%	10,068	32.62%	876	2.84%
1908	18,590	53.44%	15,451	44.41%	747	2.15%
1912	3,799	11.55%	12,423	37.78%	16,661	50.67%
1916	17,658	50.80%	15,727	45.25%	1,373	3.95%
1920	40,593	60.55%	24,581	36.67%	1,866	2.78%
1924	37,708	60.43%	16,859	27.02%	7,834	12.55%
1928	46,510	46.85%	52,665	53.05%	94	0.09%
1932	34,632	45.24%	40,793	53.28%	1,135	1.48%
1936	51,186	38.26%	80,585	60.23%	2,030	1.52%
1940	54,931	43.36%	71,343	56.32%	411	0.32%
1944	47,261	44.34%	59,190	55.54%	127	0.12%
1948	46,283	41.42%	64,495	57.71%	971	0.87%
1952	61,644	48.65%	64,926	51.24%	147	0.12%
1956	64,386	53.56%	55,741	46.37%	79	0.07%
1960	49,636	38.25%	80,098	61.72%	49	0.04%
1964	31,272	26.16%	88,131	73.73%	137	0.11%
1968	44,388	38.80%	66,297	57.96%	3,706	3.24%
1972	58,838	56.11%	45,465	43.35%	566	0.54%
1976	43,354	42.17%	57,685	56.12%	1,758	1.71%
1980	44,242	46.35%	45,257	47.42%	5,948	6.23%
1984	48,132	50.57%	45,851	48.17%	1,202	1.26%
1988	42,083	47.42%	45,591	51.38%	1,067	1.20%
1992	33,443	35.22%	45,054	47.44%	16,471	17.34%
1996	26,930	32.57%	46,377	56.09%	9,374	11.34%
2000	35,096	36.41%	57,471	59.63%	3,814	3.96%
2004	44,766	42.30%	59,573	56.30%	1,480	1.40%
2008	39,488	36.38%	67,520	62.21%	1,531	1.41%
2012	35,085	35.67%	61,838	62.87%	1,428	1.45%
2016	48,384	46.34%	51,983	49.79%	4,037	3.87%
2020	52,334	45.23%	61,991	53.58%	1,370	1.18%
2024	56,261	48.12%	59,510	50.90%	1,154	0.99%

Pennsylvania Gubernatorial election results for Lackawanna County
Year	Republican		Democratic		Third party(ies)	
Year	No.	%	No.	%	No.	%
1970	42,404	45.14%	50,493	53.75%	1,041	1.11%
1974	35,666	42.86%	47,212	56.74%	329	0.40%
1978	43,558	54.94%	35,411	44.67%	307	0.39%
1982	31,529	42.32%	42,270	56.74%	704	0.94%
1986	26,775	32.30%	55,979	67.53%	140	0.17%
1990	10,930	18.12%	49,393	81.88%	0	0.00%
1994	26,053	37.00%	36,014	51.15%	8,343	11.85%
1998	35,039	52.96%	25,297	38.24%	5,823	8.80%
2002	26,099	37.79%	40,206	58.22%	2,756	3.99%
2006	21,905	27.77%	56,966	72.23%	0	0.00%
2010	31,342	45.00%	38,300	55.00%	0	0.00%
2014	18,081	30.26%	41,680	69.74%	0	0.00%
2018	28,616	34.10%	54,237	64.63%	1,060	1.26%
2022	32,697	36.80%	54,442	61.28%	1,704	1.92%

According to the Secretary of State's office, Democrats hold a majority of the voters in Lackawanna County.

Lackawanna County Voter Registration Statistics as of January 7, 2025
Political Party	Total Voters	Percentage
Democratic	76,158	51.3%
Republican	52,298	35.3%
No Party Affiliation	16,587	11.1%
Third Parties	3,432	2.3%
Total	148,475	100.00%

The Democratic Party has been historically dominant in county-level politics since the rise of new immigrant populations and their descendants since the mid-19th century. The county is part of Pennsylvania's 8th congressional district.

On the state and national levels, Lackawanna County has strongly favored the Democratic Party for the last ninety years. It leaned Republican from 1896 to 1924, only failing to back William Howard Taft during that timespan when the party's vote was split between him and former president Theodore Roosevelt. The county has only voted for the Republican candidate three times since 1928: in the national Republican landslides of 1956, 1972, and 1984. In 2000, Democrat Al Gore won 60% of the vote and Republican George W. Bush won 36%. In 2004 Democrat John Kerry received 56% of the vote and Bush received 42%. In 2006, Democrats Governor Ed Rendell and Senator Bob Casey, Jr., won 70% and 73% of the vote in Lackawanna County, respectively. In 2008 three of four Democrats running statewide carried the county, with Barack Obama receiving 63% of the county vote to 37% for John McCain. Although Obama easily carried Lackawanna County again in 2012, Donald Trump came very close to beating Hillary Clinton in 2016. However, in 2020, Lackawanna County voted for Joe Biden, a native son of the county, by over 8 points, an improvement over Clinton's margin but not as high as either of Obama's. In Lackawanna County, Democratic strength primarily comes from the city of Scranton and its immediate suburbs, while Republicans do better in the more rural, outer parts of the county.

=== County commissioners ===
Official	Party	Term ends
Chris Chermak	Republican	2027
Bill Gaughan	Democratic	2027
Thom Welby	Democratic	2028

=== County Row Officers ===
Office	Official	Party	Term ends
Clerk of Judicial Records	Mauri B. Kelly	Democratic	2027 (Resigning September 2025)
Controller	Gary DiBileo	Democratic	2027
Coroner	Timothy Rowland	Democratic	2027
Treasurer	Angela Rempe Jones	Democratic	2027
District Attorney	Brian Gallagher	Democratic	2029
Recorder of Deeds	Evie Rafalko-McNulty	Democratic	2029
Register of Wills	Frances Kovaleski	Democratic	2029
Sheriff	Mark McAndrew	Democratic	2029

=== United States House of Representatives ===
As of January 3, 2025:

District	Representative	Party
8	Rob Bresnahan	Republican

=== United States Senate ===
As of January 3, 2025:

Senator	Party
Dave McCormick	Republican
John Fetterman	Democratic

United States Senate election results for Lackawanna County, Pennsylvania1
Year	Republican		Democratic		Third party(ies)	
Year	No.	%	No.	%	No.	%
1994	26,417	39.60%	38,967	58.42%	1,321	1.98%
2000	40,520	45.23%	47,363	52.86%	1,710	1.91%
2006	23,874	30.54%	54,289	69.46%	0	0.00%
2012	30,928	31.75%	64,940	66.67%	1,543	1.58%
2018	31,922	37.89%	51,444	61.06%	890	1.06%
2024	51,944	44.82%	61,653	53.20%	2,289	1.98%

United States Senate election results for Lackawanna County, Pennsylvania3
Year	Republican		Democratic		Third party(ies)	
Year	No.	%	No.	%	No.	%
1992	44,009	47.74%	45,349	49.19%	2,831	3.07%
1998	38,710	58.77%	25,492	38.70%	1,665	2.53%
2004	54,114	54.69%	41,513	41.96%	3,319	3.35%
2010	27,742	40.17%	41,327	59.83%	0	0.00%
2016	40,519	39.76%	53,936	52.93%	7,455	7.32%
2022	36,534	41.08%	50,489	56.77%	1,920	2.16%

=== State House of Representatives ===
As of January 13, 2023:

District	Representative	Party
112	Kyle Mullins	Democratic
113	Kyle Donahue	Democratic
114	Bridget Malloy Kosierowski	Democratic
118	Jim Haddock	Democratic

=== State senate ===
As of March 29, 2021:

District	Senator	Party
22	Marty Flynn	Democratic

== Education ==
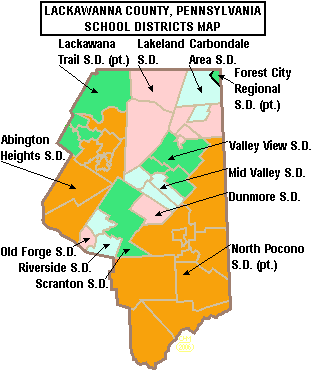
Map of Lackawanna County's public school districts

Lackawanna County Workforce investment Board - Scranton

=== Colleges and universities ===
- Johnson College
- Keystone College (also in Wyoming County)
- Lackawanna College
- Marywood University
- Penn State Scranton
- Geisinger Commonwealth School of Medicine
- University of Scranton

=== Public K-12 schools ===
==== Public school districts ====
They include:

- Abington Heights School District
- Carbondale Area School District
- Dunmore School District
- Forest City Regional School District (also in Susquehanna and Wayne Counties)
- Lackawanna Trail School District (also in Wyoming County)
- Lakeland School District
- Mid Valley School District
- North Pocono School District (also in Wayne County)
- Old Forge School District
- Riverside School District
- Scranton School District
- Valley View School District

==== Charter schools ====
- Fell Charter Elementary School, Simpson, GR K-8
- Howard Gardner Multiple Intelligence Charter School, Scranton, GR PreK-8
- Scranton School for Deaf and Hard-of-Hearing Children – public charter school offering pre-K through 12th-grade education to eligible deaf and hard-of-hearing children located in South Abington Township, Pennsylvania

==== Public vocational technology schools ====
- Career Technology Center of Lackawanna County

==== State-operated schools ====
- Scranton State School for the Deaf was in the county until it closed in 2009.

==== Intermediate unit ====
Northeastern Educational Intermediate Unit #19 (NEIU19) provides a wide variety of specialized services to public and private schools. It serves the school communities of Lackawanna County, Wayne County, and Susquehanna County. NEIU19 is governed by a board of appointed officials one from the elected school board of each member public school district. Among the serves are: professional development programs for school employees, background/criminal screening of public school employment applicants, technology support to the schools, and special education services. The Intermediate Unit coordinates and supervises the Special Education transportation.

=== Diocesan schools ===
The county is also served by the Diocese of Scranton. The Diocese of Scranton operates four regional systems of diocesan schools, which were established after the area received hundreds of thousands of Catholic immigrants. The Holy Cross School System serves Lackawanna County, and is currently composed of seven elementary centers and one secondary center. The Holy Cross System is the second-largest of the four systems, and Holy Cross High School is the only diocesan high school operating a capacity. The Holy Cross System is the result of diocese-wide consolidations made in 2007 in response to decades of declining enrollment as population declined in the area.

As recently as 2000, Lackawanna County was home to four Catholic high schools and nearly fifteen elementary schools. While the current configuration of sites and schools educates a fraction of the students once enrolled in Catholic schools in Lackawanna County, vast improvements have been made to the curriculum. Millions of dollars of capital gains have been invested in the buildings and technologies of the schools. As part of the ongoing effort to stabilize enrollment and offer a sustainable school system which is "spiritually sound and academically excellent", the Holy Cross System is embarking on a more aggressive advertising campaign to promote Catholic education and establish stronger and more diverse programs at the elementary level.

Sacred Heart Elementary in Carbondale and Marian Catholic Elementary in Scranton were closed in 2011 and were incorporated into LaSalle Academy and All Saint's Academy, respectively. This cut the costs of sustaining two faculties and buildings which collectively operated at less than 50% capacity. It bolstered the enrollments of the hubs of elementary education.

- Holy Cross High School, Dunmore
- Our Lady of Peace Elementary, Clarks Green
- St. Mary of Mount Carmel Elementary, Dunmore
- LaSalle Academy, Dickson City and Jessup
- All Saints Academy, Scranton
- St. Clare/St. Paul Elementary, Scranton

=== Private schools ===
As reported by the Pennsylvania Department of Education:

- Abington Christian School, Clarks Green, GR PreK-8 (Affiliated with the Assemblies of God)
- Bais Yaakov of Scranton, GR 9-12 (All girls Jewish school)
- DePaul School for Dyslexia, Scranton
- Friendship House
- Geneva Christian School, Olyphant, GR PreK-8
- Giant Steps Child Development Center – Carbondale
- Kinder Kampus Preparatory Preschool, Archbald, PreK
- Little People Daycare School, Scranton, GR PreK-KG
- Lourdesmont School, Scranton, Special Education (Roman Catholic)
- Lutheran Academy – Scranton, GR PreK-6
- Marywood – Tony Damiano Early Childhood Center, Scranton, GR PreK-KG
- Milton Eisner Yeshiva High School, Scranton, GR 9-12 (All boys Jewish school)
- Montessori Kindergarten, Scranton, GR PreK-KG
- New Story, Throop, Special Education
- NHS Autism School, Scranton, Special Education
- Northeast Child Care Services – Archbald
- Pocono Mountain Bible Conference – Gouldsboro
- Revival Baptist Christian School, Scranton, GR K-12
- Scranton Hebrew Day School, Scranton, GR K-8
- Scranton Preparatory School, Scranton, GR 9-12 (Affiliated with the Society of Jesus)
- St. Gregory's Early Childhood Center, Clarks Green, GR PreK-KG
- St. Stanislaus Elementary School, Scranton, GR K-8 (Polish National Catholic Church)
- Summit Christian Academy, South Abington Township, PreK-12
- Triboro Christian Academy, Old Forge, K-12, It participates in the state's Pennsylvania System of School Assessment (PSSA) annual testing

=== Libraries ===
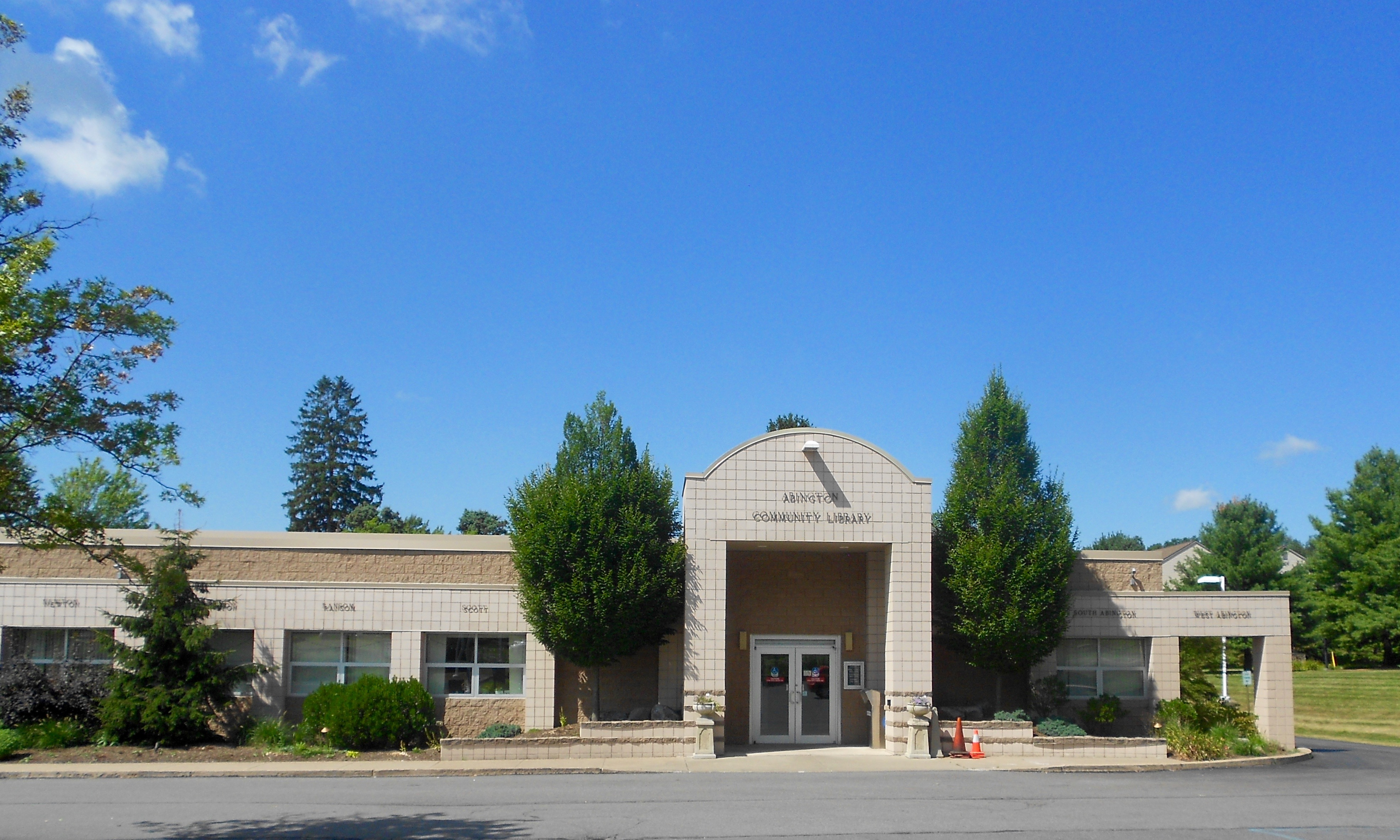
Abington Community Library in Clarks Summit

- Abington Community Library – Clarks Summit
- Carbondale Public Library – Carbondale
- Children's Library – Scranton
- Dalton Community Library – Dalton
- Nancy Kay Holmes Branch – Scranton
- North Pocono Public Library – Moscow
- Scranton Public Library – Scranton
- Taylor Community Library – Taylor
- Valley Community Library – Peckville
- Waverly Memorial Library – Waverly

== Recreation ==
- Montage Mountain Ski Area
- Lackawanna State Park
- Archbald Pothole State Park
- The Dick and Nancy Eales Preserve at Moosic Mountain
- Pinchot Trail System
- Steamtown National Historic Site
- Electric City Trolley Museum
- Viewmont Mall
- Lake Scranton
- Electric City Aquarium and Reptile Den
- Lackawanna County Courthouse Square (Downtown Scranton)
- Everhart Museum
- Scranton Iron Furnaces
- Houdini Museum
- Scranton Cultural Center
- Shoppes at Montage
- The Marketplace at Steamtown
- The Pavilion (Scranton, PA)
- Lackawanna River Heritage Trail
- Lake Scranton Walking Trail
- The Pavilion at Montage Mountain
- PNC Field
- Merli-Sarnoski Park
- Nay Aug Park
- McDade Park
- Aylesworth Park
- Covington Park

== Communities ==
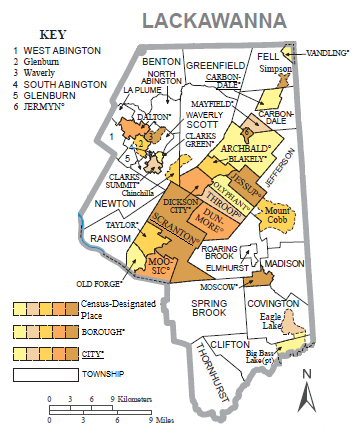
A map of Lackawanna County with municipalities and census-designated places labeled

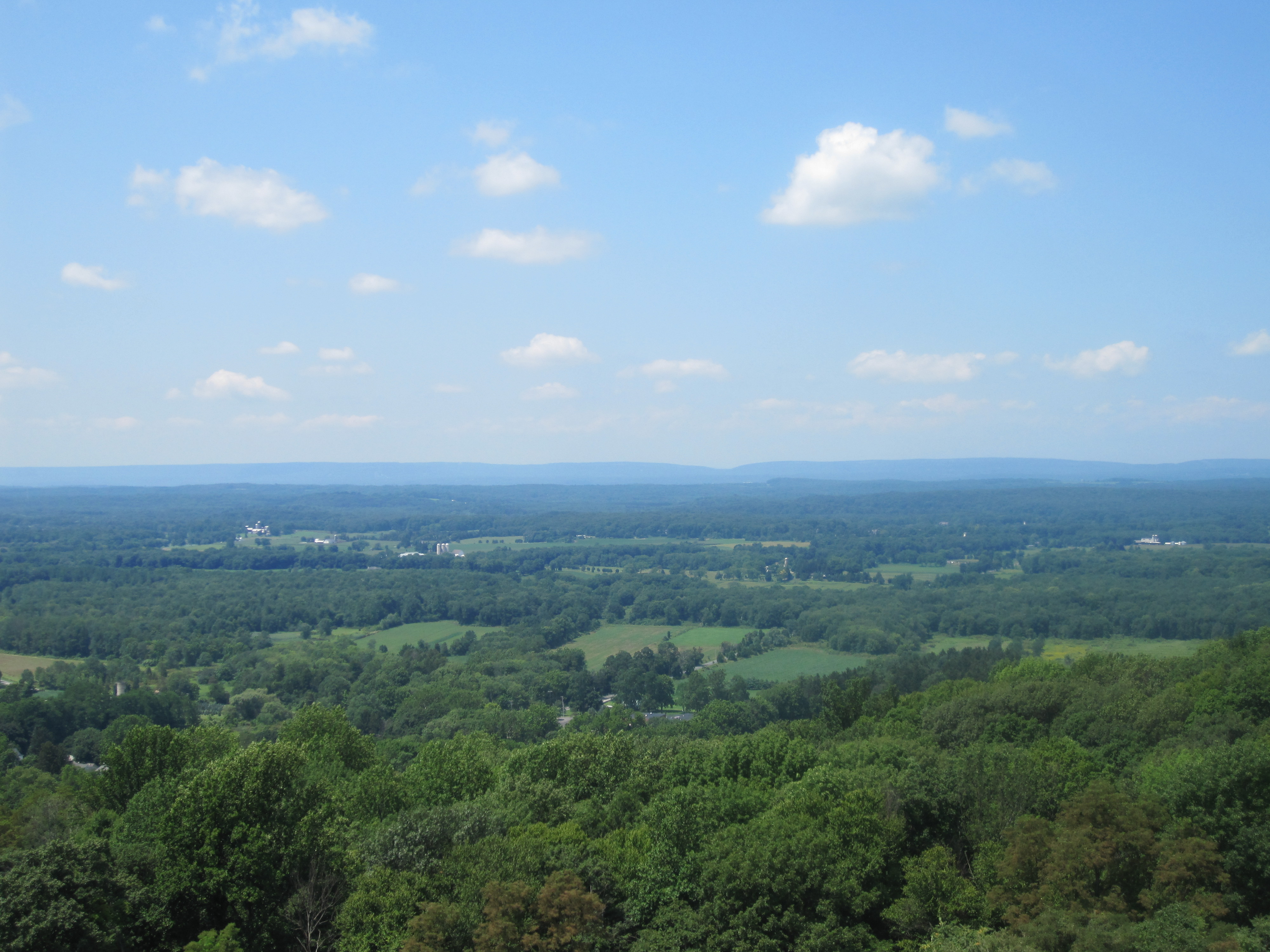
Scenery in Lackawanna County

Under Pennsylvania law, there are four types of incorporated municipalities: cities, boroughs, townships, and one town. The following cities, boroughs and townships are located in Lackawanna County:

=== Cities ===
- Carbondale
- Scranton (county seat)

=== Boroughs ===
- Archbald
- Blakely
- Clarks Green
- Clarks Summit
- Dalton
- Dickson City
- Dunmore
- Jermyn
- Jessup
- Mayfield
- Moosic
- Moscow
- Old Forge
- Olyphant
- Taylor
- Throop
- Vandling

=== Townships ===
- Benton
- Carbondale
- Clifton
- Covington
- Elmhurst
- Fell
- Glenburn
- Greenfield
- Jefferson
- La Plume
- Madison
- Newton
- North Abington
- Ransom
- Roaring Brook
- Scott
- South Abington
- Spring Brook
- Thornhurst
- Waverly
- West Abington

=== Census-designated places ===
- Big Bass Lake (partially in Wayne County)
- Chinchilla
- Eagle Lake
- Glenburn
- Mount Cobb
- Simpson
- Waverly

=== Unincorporated communities ===
- Daleville
- Milwaukee
- Winton

=== Population ranking ===
The population ranking of the following table is based on the 2010 census of Lackawanna County.

† county seat

Rank	City/Town/etc.	Municipal type	Population (2010 Census)
1	† Scranton	City	76,089
2	Dunmore	Borough	14,057
3	Carbondale	City	8,891
4	Old Forge	Borough	8,313
5	Archbald	Borough	6,984
6	Blakely	Borough	6,564
7	Taylor	Borough	6,263
8	Dickson City	Borough	6,070
9	Moosic	Borough	5,719
10	Olyphant	Borough	5,151
11	Clarks Summit	Borough	5,116
12	Jessup	Borough	4,676
13	Throop	Borough	4,088
14	Jermyn	Borough	2,169
15	Chinchilla	CDP	2,098
16	Moscow	Borough	2,026
17	Mayfield	Borough	1,807
18	Mount Cobb	CDP	1,799
19	Clarks Green	Borough	1,476
20	Simpson	CDP	1,275
21	Big Bass Lake (partially in Wayne County)	CDP	1,270
22	Dalton	Borough	1,234
23	Glenburn	CDP	953
24	Vandling	Borough	751
25	Waverly	CDP	604
26	Eagle Lake	CDP	12

== See also ==
- National Register of Historic Places listings in Lackawanna County, Pennsylvania
