= South Abington Township, Pennsylvania =

Township in Pennsylvania, US

South Abington Township
- Township
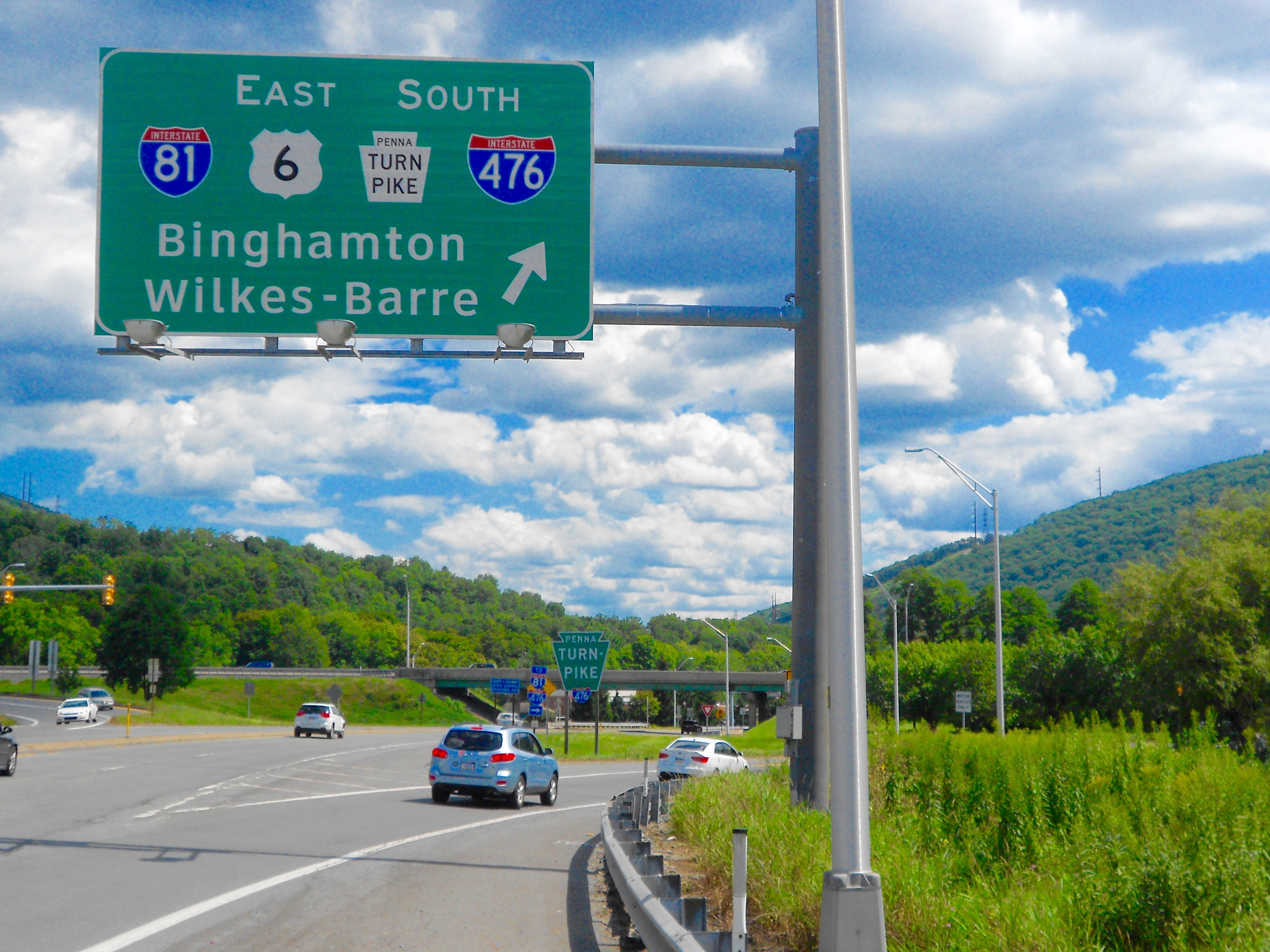
- Entrance to I-476 and I-81

- Location of Pennsylvania in the United States
- Coordinates: 41°31′00″N 75°39′59″W
- Country: United States
- State: Pennsylvania
- County: Lackawanna

Area
  - Total: 9.25 sq mi (23.96 km^{2})
  - Land: 9.11 sq mi (23.60 km^{2})
  - Water: 0.14 sq mi (0.36 km^{2})
- Elevation: 1,450 ft (440 m)

Population (2020)
  - Total: 9,526 ▲
  - Estimate (2021): 9,510
  - Density: 988.7/sq mi (381.72/km^{2})
- Time zone: UTC-5 (EST)
  - Summer (DST): UTC-4 (EDT)
- Zip Code: 18411
- Area code: 570
- FIPS code: 42-069-71872
- Website: https://southabingtonpa.gov/

Chinchilla
- Census Designated Place
- Location of PA in the United States
- Coordinates: 41°29′08″N 75°40′00″W
- Country: United States
- State: Pennsylvania
- County: Lackawanna

Area
  - Total: 2.58 sq mi (6.7 km^{2})
  - Land: 2.5 sq mi (6.5 km^{2})
  - Water: 0.08 sq mi (0.21 km^{2})
- Elevation: 1,450 ft (440 m)

Population
  - Total: 2,098
  - Density: 839.2/sq mi (324.0/km^{2})
- Time zone: UTC-5 (EST)
  - Summer (DST): UTC-4 (EDT)
- Zip Code: 18410, 18411
- Area code: 570

South Abington Township is a township in Lackawanna County, Pennsylvania, United States. The population was 9,526 at the 2020 census. The census-designated place of Chinchilla is within the township. South Abington Township is the northern terminus of the Pennsylvania Turnpike Northeast Extension (I-476).

== Geography ==
According to the United States Census Bureau, the township has a total area of 9.1 square miles (23.6 km^{2}), of which 9.0 square miles (23.2 km^{2}) is land and 0.1 square mile (0.4 km^{2}), or 1.54%, is water.

The community of Chinchilla is in the southern part of the township, mostly east of U.S. Route 11 and Interstate 81.

== Demographics ==
Historical population
Census	Pop.	Note	%±
2010	9,073		—
2020	9,526		5.0%
2021 (est.)	9,510		−0.2%
U.S. Decennial Census

As of the census of 2010, there were 9,073 people, 3,364 households, and 2,328 families residing in the township. The population density was 1,008.1 inhabitants per square mile (389.2/km^{2}). There were 3,604 housing units at an average density of 400.4 per square mile (154.6/km^{2}). The racial makeup of the township was 93.6% White, 1.3% African American, 0.1% Native American, 3.4% Asian, 0.01% Pacific Islander, 0.4% from other races, and 1.3% from two or more races. Hispanic or Latino of any race were 1.9% of the population.

There were 3,364 households, out of which 29.8% had children under the age of 18 living with them, 59.5% were married couples living together, 6.9% had a female householder with no husband present, and 30.8% were non-families. 26.8% of all households were made up of individuals, and 14.4% had someone living alone who was 65 years of age or older. The average household size was 2.51 and the average family size was 3.07.

In the township the population was spread out, with 21.7% under the age of 18, 61.6% from 18 to 64, and 16.7% who were 65 years of age or older. The median age was 42.2 years.

The median income for a household in the township was $75,703, and the median income for a family was $101,188. Males had a median income of $66,379 versus $44,345 for females. The per capita income for the township was $32,935. About 2.2% of families and 2.8% of the population were below the poverty line, including 4.4% of those under age 18 and 0.9% of those age 65 or over.

== Education ==
There are two public schools within the boundaries of South Abington. All students residing in South Abington attend schools in the top-ranked Abington Heights School District. South Abington is home to South Abington Elementary School and Abington Heights High School. Middle school students attend Abington Heights Middle School.

Sukanya Roy, who won the 2011 National Spelling Bee, is from South Abington Township.

Scranton School for Deaf and Hard-of-Hearing Children is in South Abington Township.

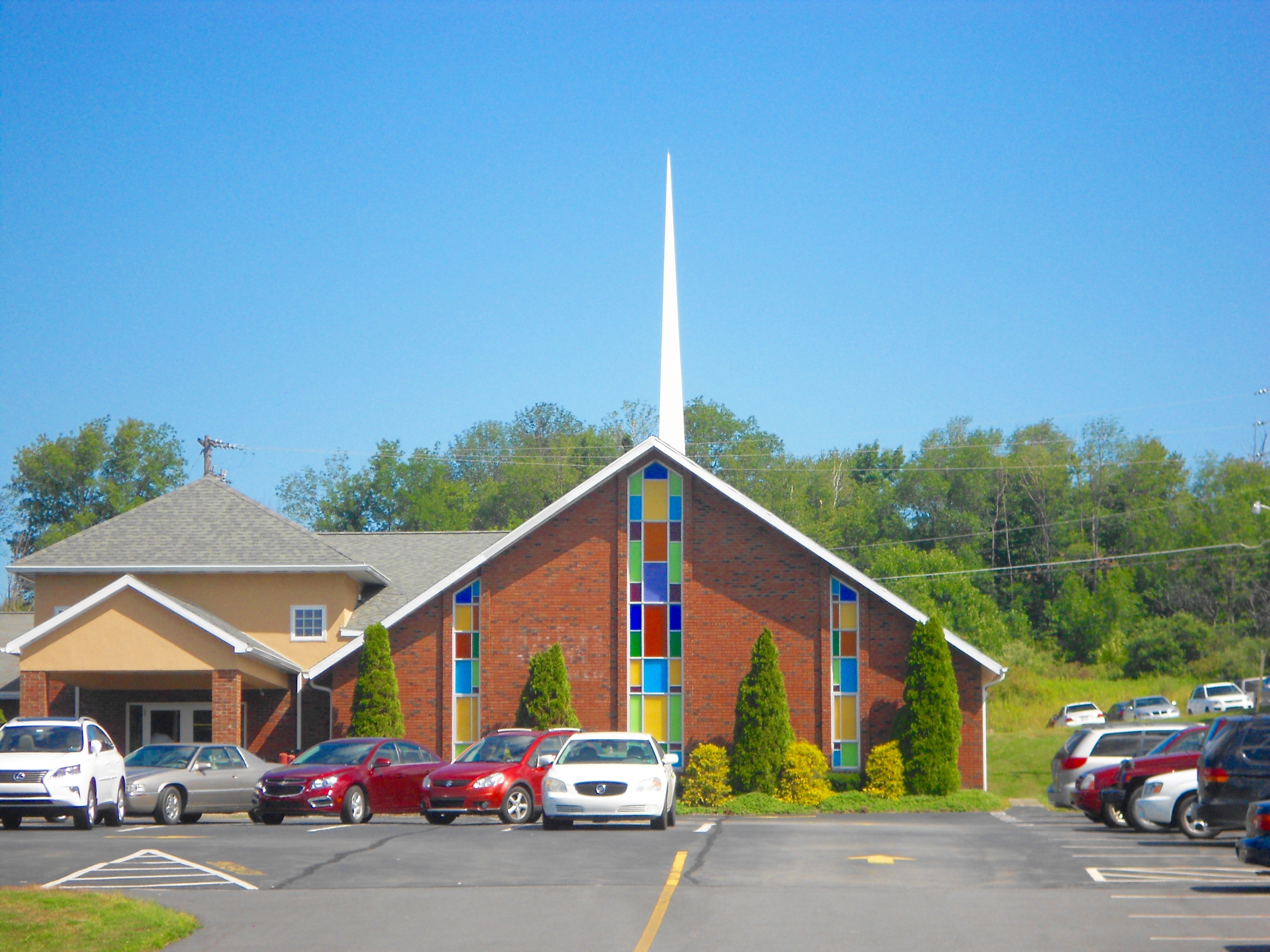
Heritage Baptist Church near Clarks Green
