= Newton Township, Pennsylvania =

Township in Pennsylvania, US

Newton Township
- Township (Pennsylvania)
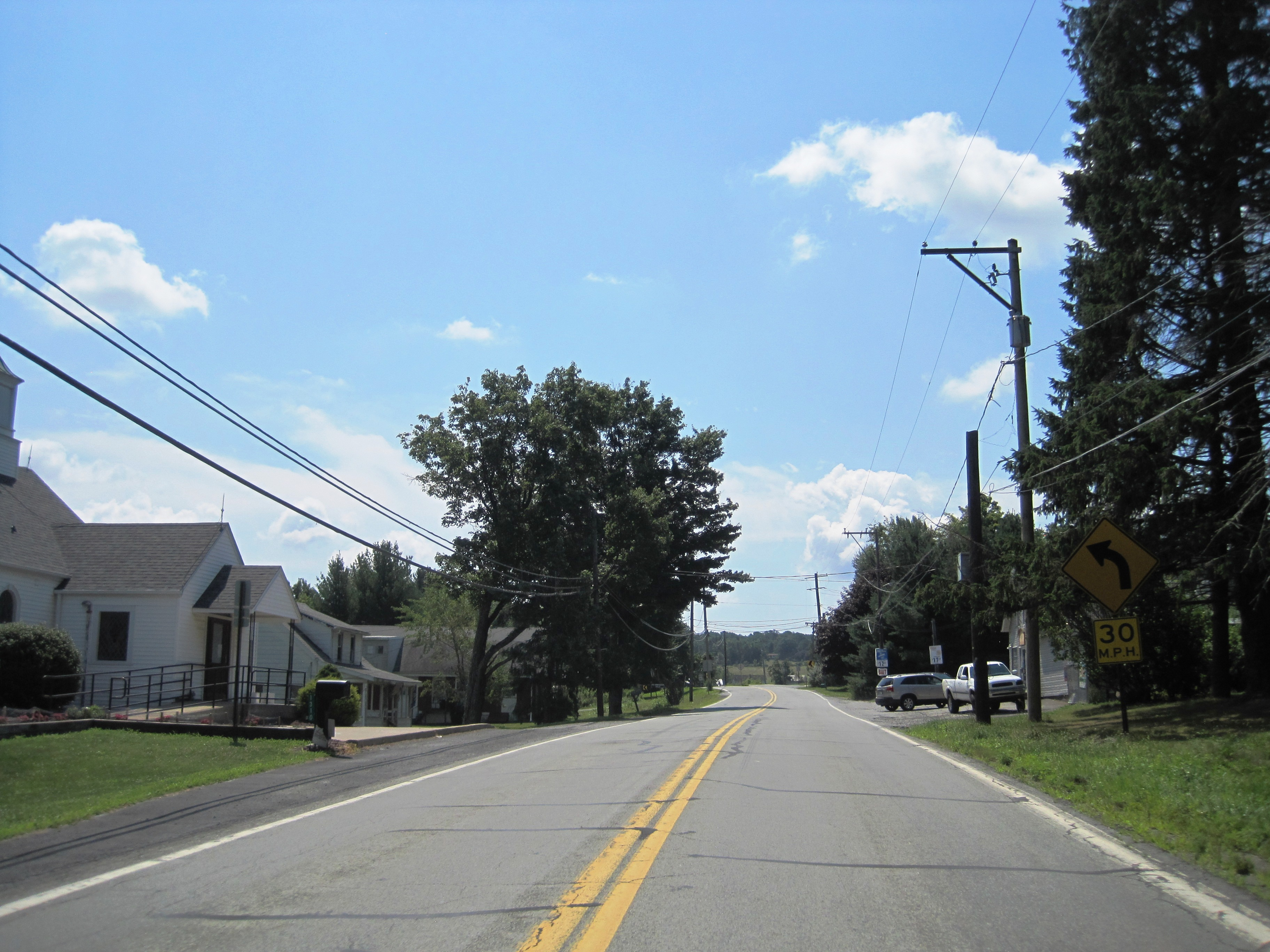
- PA 307 in the village of Schultzville

- Location of Pennsylvania in the United States
- Coordinates: 41°30′06″N 75°45′59″W
- Country: United States
- State: Pennsylvania
- County: Lackawanna

Area
  - Total: 22.50 sq mi (58.27 km^{2})
  - Land: 22.27 sq mi (57.67 km^{2})
  - Water: 0.24 sq mi (0.61 km^{2})
- Elevation: 1,381 ft (421 m)

Population (2020)
  - Total: 2,823 ▼
  - Estimate (2021): 2,866
  - Density: 124.9/sq mi (48.24/km^{2})
- Time zone: UTC-5 (EST)
  - Summer (DST): UTC-4 (EDT)
- ZIP Code: 18411
- Area code: 570
- FIPS code: 42-069-54136

Newton Township is a township in Lackawanna County, Pennsylvania, United States. The population was 2,823 at the 2020 census.

== Geography ==
According to the United States Census Bureau, the township has a total area of 22.7 square miles (58.8 km^{2}), of which 22.4 square miles (58.1 km^{2}) is land and 0.3 square mile (0.7 km^{2}) (1.19%) is water.

== Demographics ==
Historical population
Census	Pop.	Note	%±
2010	2,846		—
2020	2,823		−0.8%
2021 (est.)	2,866		1.5%
U.S. Decennial Census

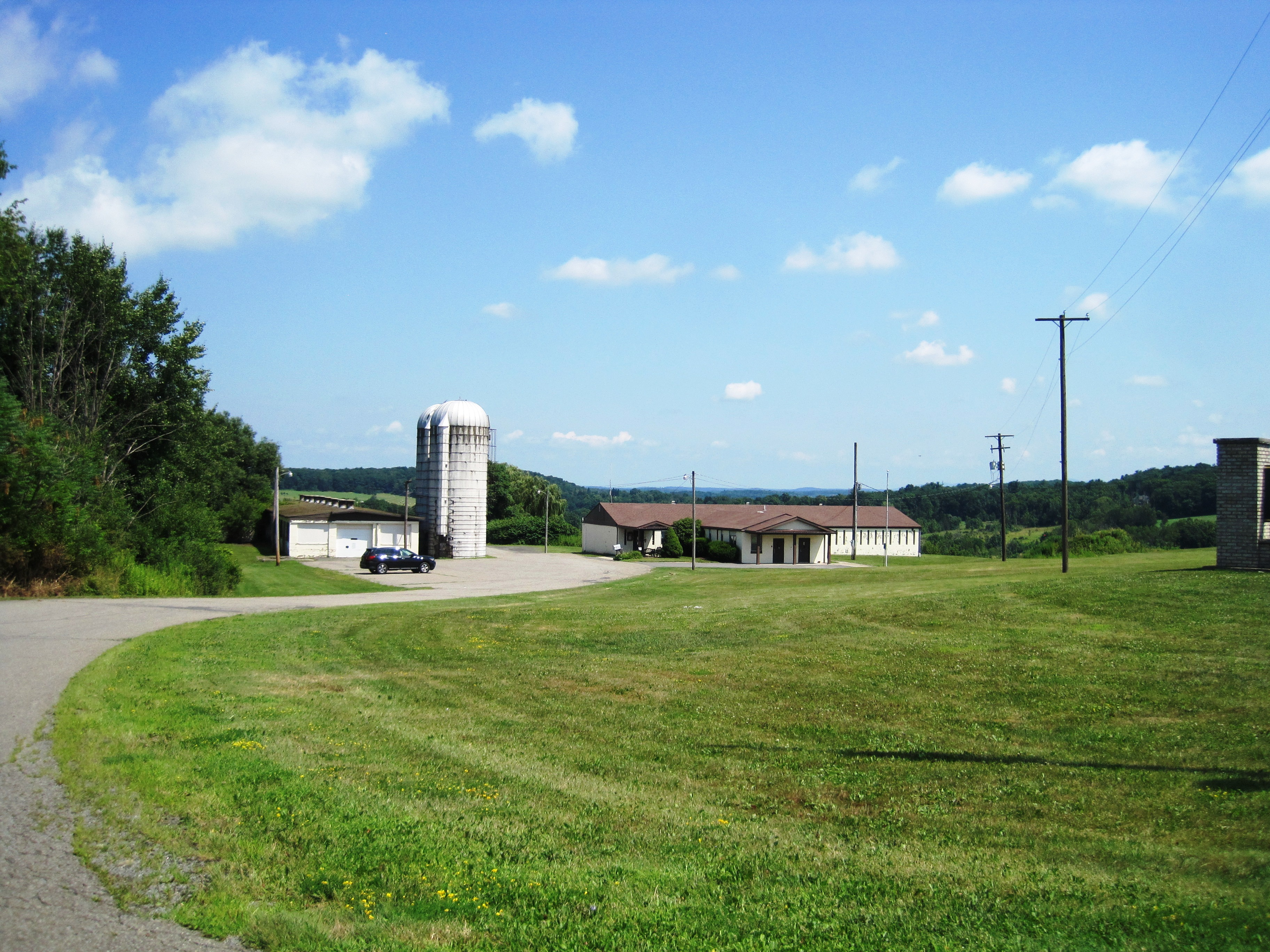
Newton Municipal Building

As of the census of 2010, there were 2,846 people, 982 households, and 772 families residing in the township. The population density was 127 people per square mile (49/km^{2}). There were 1,043 housing units at an average density of 46.6 per square mile (18.0/km^{2}). The racial makeup of the township was 98.2% White, 0.5% African American, 0.01% Native American, 0.5% Asian, 0.2% from other races, and 0.6% from two or more races. Hispanic or Latino of any race were 0.9% of the population.

There were 919 households, out of which 30.1% had children under the age of 18 living with them, 66.8% were married couples living together, 7.6% had a female householder with no husband present, and 21.4% were non-families. 17.6% of all households were made up of individuals, and 8.3% had someone living alone who was 65 years of age or older. The average household size was 2.72 and the average family size was 3.05.

In the township the population was spread out, with 21.6% under the age of 18, 63.7% from 18 to 64, and 14.7% who were 65 years of age or older. The median age was 44.7 years.

The median income for a household in the township was $66,940, and the median income for a family was $78,580. Males had a median income of $53,681 versus $38,462 for females. The per capita income for the township was $35,264. About 1.8% of families and 5% of the population were below the poverty line, including 3.8% of those under age 18 and 6.9% of those age 65 or over.
