= Clarks Summit, Pennsylvania =

Borough in Pennsylvania, US

- Borough
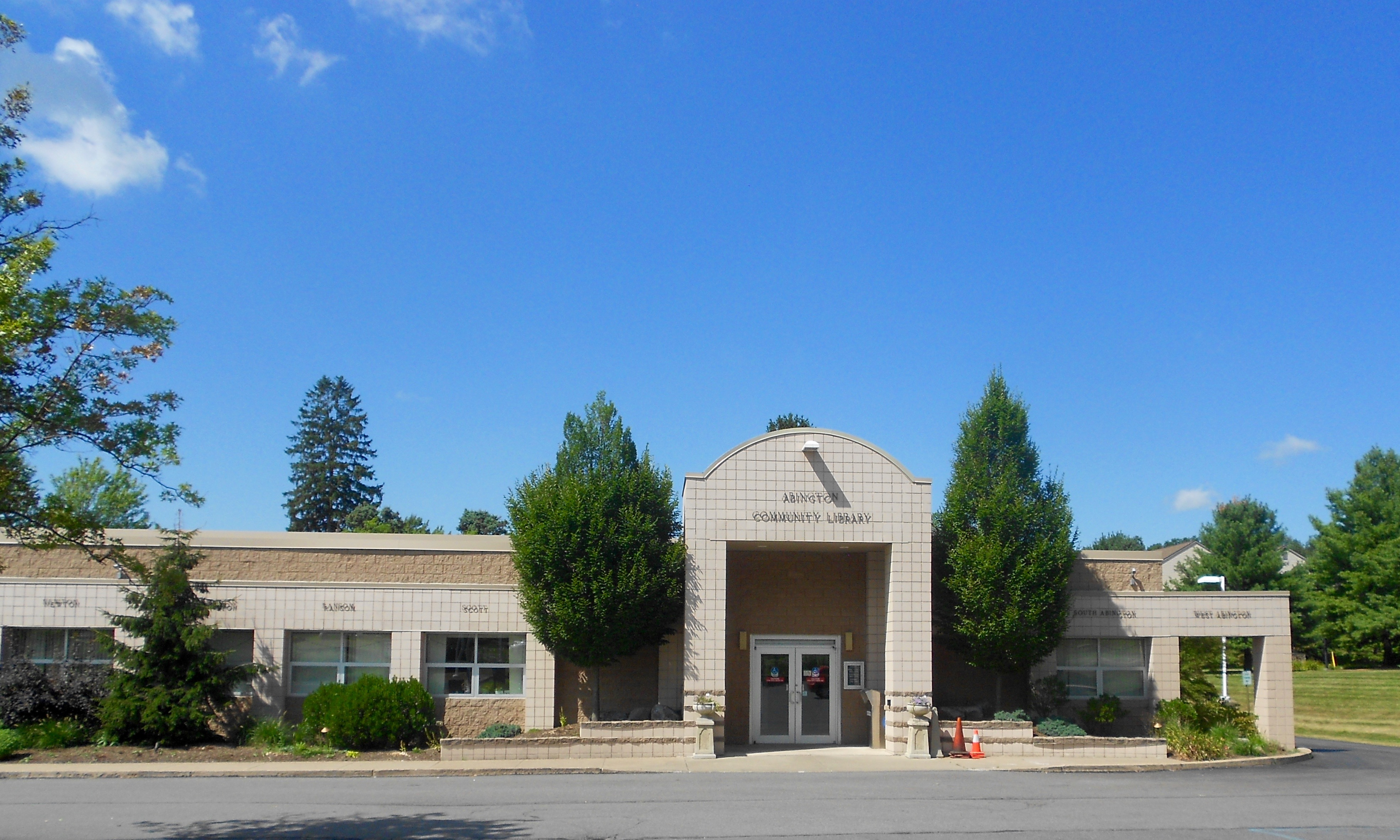
- Abington Community Library

- Seal

- Location of Clarks Summit in Lackawanna County, Pennsylvania

- Location in Pennsylvania Location in the United States
- Coordinates: 41°29′34″N 75°42′18″W
- Country: United States
- State: Pennsylvania
- County: Lackawanna
- Borough Council: Established 1911

Government
  - Mayor: Harry Kelly

Area
  - Total: 1.59 sq mi (4.11 km^{2})
  - Land: 1.59 sq mi (4.11 km^{2})
  - Water: 0 sq mi (0.00 km^{2})
- Elevation: 1,289 ft (393 m)

Population (2020)
  - Total: 5,107
  - Density: 3,221.7/sq mi (1,243.89/km^{2})
- Time zone: UTC-5 (EST)
  - Summer (DST): UTC-4 (EDT)
- ZIP Code: 18411
- Area codes: 570 and 272
- FIPS code: 42-13880
- Website: www.clarkssummitboro.org

Clarks Summit is a borough in Lackawanna County, northwest of Scranton in Northeastern Pennsylvania. The population was 5,108 at the 2020 census. It is also the northern control city of the Pennsylvania Turnpike Northeast Extension, I-476, though the official terminus is in adjacent South Abington Township.

== History ==
The first settler in the area currently known as Clarks Summit was William Clark. Clark had fought in the Battle of Bunker Hill during the Revolutionary War, and as payment for his military service, he was issued 800 acres (3.2 km^{2}) of Pennsylvania land by Congress. Because of disputes between Pennsylvania and Connecticut over the area of land that is now northern Pennsylvania (resulting in the Pennamite–Yankee War), the land deed issued to Clark was deemed invalid by the Luzerne County land grant office. Clark had no choice but to pay for the land himself. In March 1799, Clark and his three sons moved into a log cabin in the Abington wilderness, located on what is currently the Clarks Green Cemetery. The first school was built in 1893 and was destroyed by fire two years later. The village of Clarks Summit and an adjacent tract of land were incorporated into the Borough of Clarks Summit on August 30, 1911.

Clarks Summit is a location in the "Threat Level Midnight" episode of The Office.

== Geography ==
Clarks Summit is located at 41°29′34″N 75°42′18″W (41.492878, -75.704904).

According to the U.S. Census Bureau, the borough has a total area of 1.6 square miles (4.1 km^{2}), all land.

== Demographics ==
Historical population
Census	Pop.	Note	%±
1880	92		—
1920	1,404		—
1930	2,604		85.5%
1940	2,691		3.3%
1950	2,940		9.3%
1960	3,693		25.6%
1970	5,376		45.6%
1980	5,272		−1.9%
1990	5,433		3.1%
2000	5,126		−5.7%
2010	5,116		−0.2%
2020	5,107		−0.2%
2023 (est.)	5,060	▼	−0.9%

=== 2020 ===
At the 2020 census there were 5,072 people, and 2,282 households in the borough. The population density was 3,222.1 inhabitants per square mile (1,244.1/km^{2}). The racial makeup of the borough was 92.6% White alone, 0.0% African American, 0.1% American Indian, 0.3% Asian, and 4.8% from two or more races. Hispanic or Latino of any race were 6.7%.

The median household income was $87,102. The per capita income for the borough was $49,518. About 2.1% of the population were below the poverty line.

=== 2010 ===
At the 2010 census there were 5,116 people, 2,216 households, and 1,407 families living in the borough. The population density was 3,197.5 inhabitants per square mile (1,234.6/km^{2}). There were 2,324 housing units at an average density of 1,452.5 units per square mile (560.8 units/km^{2}). The racial makeup of the borough was 97% White, 0.7% African American, 0.1% Native American, 1.2% Asian, 0.4% from other races, and 0.7% from two or more races. Hispanic or Latino of any race were 1.4%.

There were 2,216 households, 25.3% had children under the age of 18 living with them, 51.2% were married couples living together, 9.6% had a female householder with no husband present, and 36.5% were non-families. 32.3% of households were made up of individuals, and 18.6% were one person aged 65 or older. The average household size was 2.31 and the average family size was 2.95.

The age distribution was 21.3% under the age of 18, 58.3% from 18 to 64, and 20.4% 65 or older. The median age was 45.4 years.

=== 2000 ===
At the 2000 census there were 5,126 people, 2,190 households, and 1,438 families living in the borough. The population density was 3,206.7 inhabitants per square mile (1,238.1/km^{2}). There were 2,273 housing units at an average density of 1,421.9 units per square mile (549.0 units/km^{2}). The racial makeup of the borough was 97.74% White, 0.39% African American, 0.10% Native American, 1.13% Asian, 0.02% Pacific Islander, 0.23% from other races, and 0.39% from two or more races. Hispanic or Latino of any race were 0.94%.

Of the 2,190 households 27.4% had children under the age of 18 living with them, 55.8% were married couples living together, 8.0% had a female householder with no husband present, and 34.3% were non-families. 31.6% of households were one person and 17.1% were one person aged 65 or older. The average household size was 2.34 and the average family size was 2.96.

The age distribution was 22.4% under the age of 18, 5.8% from 18 to 24, 24.6% from 25 to 44, 28.4% from 45 to 64, and 18.8% 65 or older. The median age was 43 years. For every 100 females there were 89.2 males. For every 100 females age 18 and over, there were 83.2 males. The median household income was $45,298 and the median family income was $65,262. Males had a median income of $48,487 versus $26,398 for females. The per capita income for the borough was $25,080. About 1.3% of families and 3.9% of the population were below the poverty line, including none of those under age 18 and 8.0% of those age 65 or over.

== Notable places ==
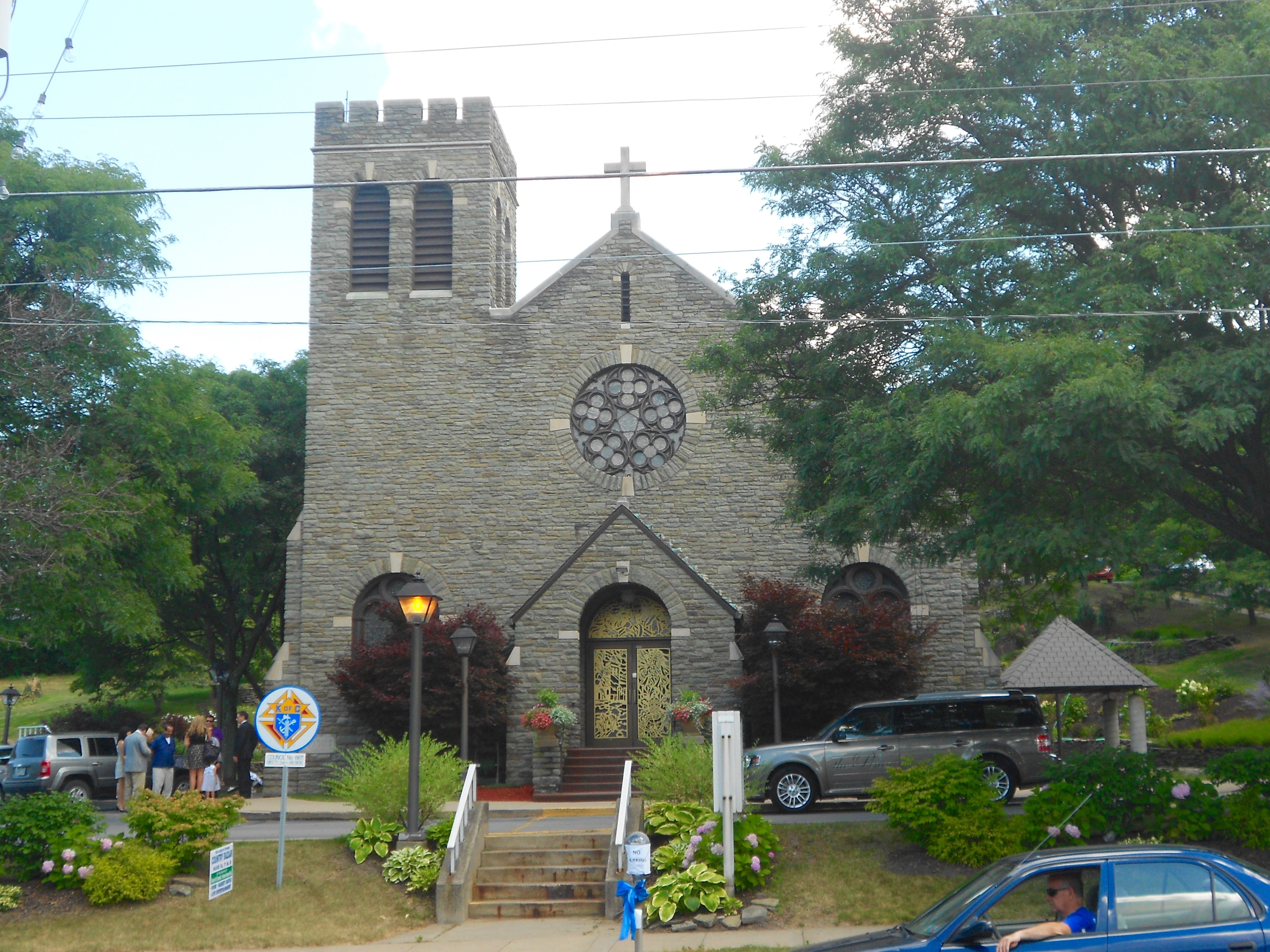
Our Lady of the Snows Parish

The oldest standing house is the former Snook family house, built in 1837 and located on South State Street.

== Education ==
It is in the Abington Heights School District.

Scranton School for Deaf and Hard-of-Hearing Children is in South Abington Township, and has a postal address using the city name Clarks Summit.

== Notable people ==
- Joe Amato, drag racing professional
- Bruce Beemer, 49th Pennsylvania Attorney General and former Inspector General of Pennsylvania
- Amber Jacobs, WNBA basketball player
- Joseph McDade, congressman who lived in Clarks Summit while in office
- Summer Rayne Oakes, eco-model and environmental activist
- Adam Rippon, Olympic figure skater
- Cory Spangenberg, Major League Baseball infielder
- Warren Stevens, actor
- Lauren Weisberger, author of The Devil Wears Prada
- Florian ZaBach, violinist

== Sister city ==
- (United Kingdom) Ystradgynlais, Wales, UK
