= Glenburn Township, Lackawanna County, Pennsylvania =

Township in Pennsylvania, US

Glenburn Township
- Township
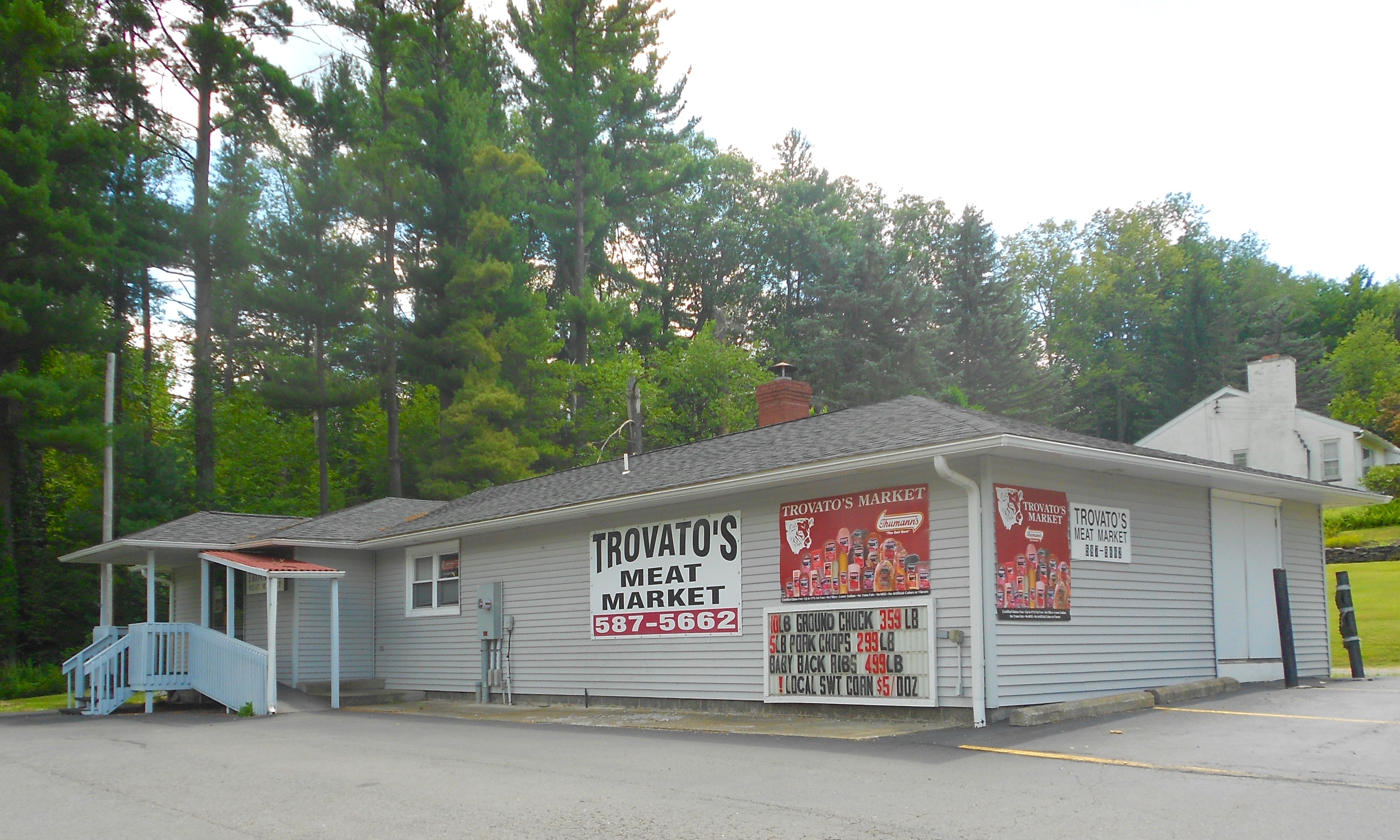
- Shop on US 11

- Location of Pennsylvania in the United States
- Coordinates: 41°30′30″N 75°45′05″W
- Country: United States
- State: Pennsylvania
- County: Lackawanna

Area
  - Total: 4.79 sq mi (12.41 km^{2})
  - Land: 4.64 sq mi (12.02 km^{2})
  - Water: 0.15 sq mi (0.39 km^{2})
- Elevation: 1,194 ft (364 m)

Population (2020)
  - Total: 1,441 ▲
  - Estimate (2021): 1,440
  - Density: 263.9/sq mi (101.89/km^{2})
- Time zone: UTC-5 (EST)
  - Summer (DST): UTC-4 (EDT)
- Area code: 570
- FIPS code: 42-069-29504
- Website: glenburntownship.org

Glenburn Township is a township in Lackawanna County, Pennsylvania, founded in 1877. The population was 1,441 at the 2020 census.

== Geography ==
According to the United States Census Bureau, the township has a total area of 4.9 square miles (13 km^{2}), of which 4.7 square miles (12 km^{2}) is land and 0.2 square miles (0.52 km^{2}), or 3.27%, is water. It includes the census-designated place of Glenburn.

== Demographics ==
Historical population
Census	Pop.	Note	%±
2010	1,246		—
2020	1,441		15.7%
2021 (est.)	1,440		−0.1%
U.S. Decennial Census

As of the census of 2000, there were 1,246 people, 498 households, and 359 families residing in the township. The population density was 265.1 inhabitants per square mile (102.4/km^{2}). There were 547 housing units at an average density of 116.4 units per square mile (44.9 units/km^{2}). The racial makeup of the township was 95.1% White, 1% African American, 0.1% Native American, 1.4% Asian, 0.2% from other races, and 2.2% from two or more races. Hispanic or Latino of any race were 2.2% of the population.

There were 498 households, out of which 28.7% had children under the age of 18 living with them, 61.8% were married couples living together, 6.2% had a female householder with no husband present, and 27.9% were non-families. 24.1% of all households were made up of individuals, and 10.0% had someone living alone who was 65 years of age or older. The average household size was 2.5 and the average family size was 2.99.

In the township the population was spread out, with 21.6% under the age of 18, 61.4% from 18 to 64, and 17% who were 65 years of age or older. The median age was 46.3 years.

The median income for a household in the township was $66,528, and the median income for a family was $78,098. Males had a median income of $63,000 versus $28,750 for females. The per capita income for the township was $37,469. About 6.1% of families and 5.1% of the population were below the poverty line, including 3.9% of those under age 18 and 9.2% of those age 65 or over.
