= Clarks Green, Pennsylvania =

Borough in Pennsylvania, US

- Borough
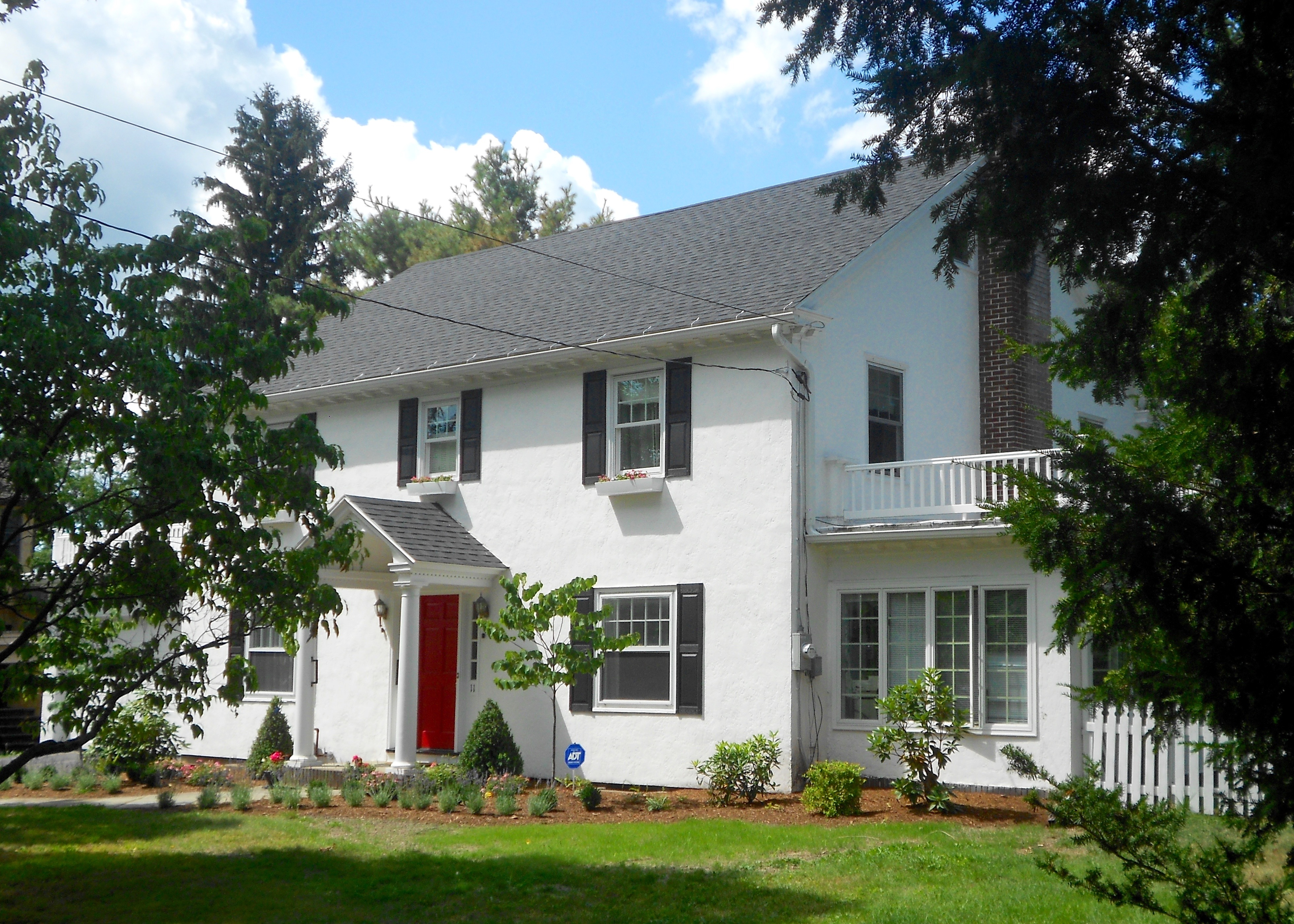
- House in Clarks Green

- Location in Lackawanna County, Pennsylvania

- Location of in Pennsylvania Location in the United States
- Coordinates: 41°29′54″N 75°41′41″W
- Country: United States
- State: Pennsylvania
- County: Lackawanna

Area
  - Total: 0.53 sq mi (1.38 km^{2})
  - Land: 0.53 sq mi (1.38 km^{2})
  - Water: 0 sq mi (0.00 km^{2})
- Elevation: 1,427 ft (435 m)

Population (2020)
  - Total: 1,524
  - Density: 2,856.4/sq mi (1,102.88/km^{2})
- Time zone: UTC-5 (EST)
  - Summer (DST): UTC-4 (EDT)
- Zip Code: 18411
- Area code: 570
- FIPS code: 42-13864
- Website: clarksgreen.info

Clarks Green is a borough in Lackawanna County, Pennsylvania, United States. It is part of Northeastern Pennsylvania. The population was 1,529 at the 2020 census.

== Geography ==
Clarks Green is located at 41°29′54″N 75°41′41″W (41.498378, -75.694803). According to the U.S. Census Bureau, the borough has a total area of 0.6 square miles (1.6 km^{2}), all land.

== Demographics ==
Historical population
Census	Pop.	Note	%±
1880	207		—
1920	350		—
1930	694		98.3%
1940	726		4.6%
1950	824		13.5%
1960	1,256		52.4%
1970	1,674		33.3%
1980	1,862		11.2%
1990	1,603		−13.9%
2000	1,630		1.7%
2010	1,476		−9.4%
2020	1,524		3.3%
2021 (est.)	1,525	▲	0.1%

As of the census of 2010, there were 1,476 people, 597 households, and 425 families residing in the borough. The population density was 2,460 inhabitants per square mile (950/km^{2}). There were 622 housing units at an average density of 1,036.7 units per square mile (400.3 units/km^{2}). The racial makeup of the borough was 96.6% White, 0.7% African American, 0.1% American Indian, 2% Asian, 0.06% from other races, and 0.4% from two or more races. Hispanic or Latino of any race were 1.5% of the population.

There were 597 households, out of which 27% had children under the age of 18 living with them, 61.6% were married couples living together, 6.9% had a female householder with no husband present, and 28.8% were non-families. 24.8% of all households were made up of individuals, and 13.9% had someone living alone who was 65 years of age or older. The average household size was 2.47 and the average family size was 2.97.

In the borough the population was spread out, with 22.5% under the age of 18, 59.2% from 18 to 64, and 18.3% who were 65 years of age or older. The median age was 47 years.

The median income for a household in the borough was $61,250, and the median income for a family was $74,250. Males had a median income of $60,000 versus $32,159 for females. The per capita income for the borough was $35,975. About 3.5% of families and 3.6% of the population were below the poverty line, including 4.6% of those under age 18 and 0.7% of those age 65 or over.
