= Lakeland School District (Pennsylvania) =

School district in Pennsylvania

Coordinates: 41.581°N 75.596°W

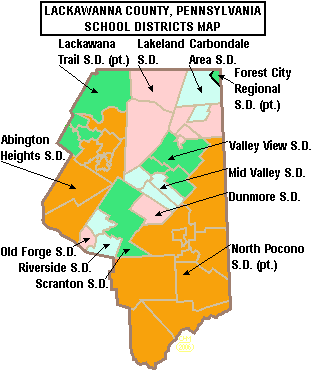

Address
- 1355 Lakeland Drive Scott Township, Lackawanna County, Pennsylvania, 18433-3140; United States

District information
- Type: Public

Other information
- Website: http://www.lakelandsd.org/

Lakeland Junior-Senior High School

Location
- 1355 Lakeland Drive; Scott Township, (Allegheny County), Pennsylvania 18433; United States

Information
- Type: Public high school
- School district: Lakeland School District
- Principal: Carmella Bullick
- Staff: 47.25 (FTE)
- Enrollment: 640 (2023-24)
- Student to teacher ratio: 13.54
- Colors: Blue and red
- Nickname: Chiefs

Crest of the Lakeland School District

The Lakeland School District is a small, rural, public school district located in northern Lackawanna County, Pennsylvania. It comprises the boroughs of Jermyn and Mayfield and the townships of Carbondale (to be distinguished from the city of Carbondale which it partially surrounds), Greenfield, and Scott. It was organized June 30, 1968 as a jointure among the three districts previously serving the five municipalities. Lakeland School District encompasses an area of 66.2 square miles (171 km^{2}). Lakeland School District attendance area had a population of 11,966, according to the 2000 federal census. By 2010, the district's population increased to 12,097 people. The educational attainment levels for the School District population (25 years old and over) were 91.8% high school graduates and 24.7% college graduates. The district is one of the 500 public school districts of Pennsylvania.

According to the Pennsylvania Budget and Policy Center, 29.2% of the district's pupils lived at 185% or below the Federal Poverty Level as shown by their eligibility for the federal free or reduced price school meal programs in 2012. In 2009, Lakeland School District residents' per capita income was $18,876, while the median family income was $45,653 a year. In the Commonwealth, the median family income was $49,501 and the United States median family income was $49,445, in 2010. In Lackawanna County, the median household income was $43,673. By 2013, the median household income in the United States rose to $52,100. In 2014, the median household income in the USA was $53,700.

Lakeland School District operates three schools: Lakeland Elementary School - Scott Campus (K-6), Lakeland Elementary School - Mayfield Campus (K-6), and Lakeland Junior/Senior High School (7-12). Occupational training and adult education in various vocational and technical fields were provided by the district and the Career and Technology Center of Lackawanna County. Special education is provided by the district and the Northeastern Educational Intermediate Unit NEIU19. The federal government controls programs it funds like: Title I funding for low income children in the Elementary and Secondary Education Act and the No Child Left Behind Act, which mandates the district focus resources on student success in acquiring reading and math skills.

The Lakeland area has become bound by the school as a community. Lakeland's geographic position with respect to the other districts of Lackawanna County is illustrated in the map given. However, no roads provide direct links to Mid Valley or North Pocono. Also, not shown are neighboring districts Mountain View (Susquehanna County) to the north and Western Wayne (Wayne County) to the east. Long Carbondale and Valley View borders indicate Lakeland's particularly strong relationships with each. They are two of the Lakeland High School Chiefs' most competitive athletic rivals. Many Lakeland families have close relatives in, or descend from natives of, both areas. Finally, most of Lakeland's country residents travel to the city of Carbondale or the towns of Valley View regularly for work, shopping, and recreation.

== Regions and constituent municipalities ==
The district is divided into three regions, which include the following municipalities:

Region I

- Greenfield Township
- Jermyn Borough

Region II

- Carbondale Township
- Mayfield Borough

Region III

- Scott Township

== Extracurricular activities ==
The district offers a wide variety of clubs, activities and an extensive, publicly funded sports program.

=== Athletics ===
The district provides:

Fall Sports

- Cross Country
- Golf
- Football
- Football cheerleading
- Jr. High girls' basketball
- Soccer

Winter Sports

- Basketball
- Basketball cheerleading
- Bowling

Spring Sports

- Baseball
- Lacrosse
- Softball
- Track and Field

=== Performing Arts ===
- Chorus
- Concert Band
- Curtain Club
- Drill Team
- Marching band

=== Miscellaneous ===
- Art club
- Envirothon
- Family, Career and Community Leaders of America
- Future Business Leaders of America
- Lakeland Lance journalism club
- Mock Trial
- Mu Alpha Theta
- National Honor Society
- Pennsylvania Junior Academy of Science
- Reading team
- Scholastic Bowl
- Ski club
- Students Against Destructive Decisions
- Student Council
- Watershed club
- Yearbook club
