= General Revision Act =

1891 U.S. law

Forest Reserve Act of 1891
- Other short titles: Forest Reserve Act; General Land Law Revision Act
- Long title: An Act to repeal timber-culture laws, and for other purposes.
- Acronyms (colloquial): FRA
- Nicknames: Creative Act
- Enacted by: the 51st United States Congress
- Effective: March 3, 1891

Citations
- Public law: 51-561
- Statutes at Large: 26 Stat. 1095

Codification
- Titles amended: 16 U.S.C.: Conservation
- U.S.C. sections created: 16 U.S.C. ch. 2, subch. I § 471 et seq.

Legislative history
- Signed into law by President Benjamin Harrison on March 3, 1891

The General Revision Act (sometimes Land Revision Act) of 1891, also known as the Forest Reserve Act of 1891, was a federal law signed in 1891 by President Benjamin Harrison. The Act reversed previous policy initiatives, such as the Timber Culture Act of 1873, which did not preclude land fraud by wealthy individuals and corporations. The acquisition of vast mineral and timber resources in the Western United States was often cited as a governing motive for such individuals and corporations to claim land rights for future settlement and resource depletion activities. The legacy of the General Revision Act of 1891 is frequently credited as its serving as a catalyst to a series of federal land reform initiatives, notably under President Theodore Roosevelt. From the Reclamation Act of 1902 to the formation of the United States Forest Service in 1905, the General Revision Act of 1891 acted as a critical first piece of federal legislation granting increased plots of publicly allotted land and decreased extraction rights to privately held western land owners in the early 20th century.

The law gives the President of the United States the authority to unilaterally set aside forest reserves from land in the public domain. After newspapers began to publicize the fraud and speculation under the previous Timber Culture Act of 1873 that granted additional land to homesteaders agreeing to plant trees, scientists of the American Association for the Advancement of Science (AAAS) joined with the American Forestry Association to advocate for stronger laws for the management of the nation's forest land. The resulting act, passed by the 51st United States Congress and signed into law by President Benjamin Harrison on March 3, 1891, set out to both protect local watersheds from flooding and erosion as well as to prevent over-exploitation of the country's timber supply.

Under the act, President Harrison issued proclamations establishing 13 million acres (53,000 km^{2}) of land as forest reserves; President Grover Cleveland proclaimed 25 million acres (100,000 km^{2}) and President William McKinley 7 million acres (28,000 km^{2}). In 1907 a law was passed limiting presidential authority to designate forest reserves in certain states and renamed the existing "forest reserves" as "national forests".

== Historical context ==
Prior to the enactment of the General Revision Act of 1891, previous major land policy initiatives had allowed for growing monopolization of western lands by wealthy individuals and corporations. Major concerns centered around the general theft of public natural resources, as well as the blatant fraud that was occurring under existing homesteading policy. The Timber Culture Act of 1873 was enacted to foster cultivation of timber in arid regions by making available 160 free acres of land to anybody willing to plant trees upon 40 acres of it. However, the new law had numerous loopholes that allowed non-residents to claim land for speculation purposes, and family members to give land to other family members to circumvent formal ownership and avoid taxation. In addition, there was concern for the preservation of watersheds, protection of the forests from fires, and the desire to regulate timber sales. Initiatives such as the Desert Land Act of 1877 were also enacted, giving 640 acres of land at $1.25 per acre to anybody willing to irrigate the land within three years. These conditional land contracts allowed groups such as stock ranchers, timber/mining companies, and land speculators to acquire vast acreage of land for little cost or consequence. The Jeffersonian ideal of small-scale land ownership could not be achieved under these circumstances, as monopolization of private lands was occurring at a rapid pace, often spanning 67,000 to million acres per purchase. Despite these transactions, the federal government had secured some large-scale land reserves prior to the General Revision Act's enactment. These reserves included Yosemite, secured in 1864 as a permanent trust, as well as two million acres within the Yellowstone Valley in 1872. Upon the General Revision Act's enactment in 1891, President Harrison immediately withdrew 1.2 million additional acres from the Yellowstone Valley, the first of an eventual 13 million-acre reserve campaign throughout the Harrison presidency.

Early advocates of federal forest reserves included Franklin B. Hough, later the first chief of the United States Division of Forestry, and Harvard botanist George Barrell Emerson, along with other members of the American Association for the Advancement of Science (AAAS). The AAAS advocated for the commission of a forest protection study, which Minnesota Congressman Mark H. Dunnell proposed in an 1874 bill. Although that bill failed to pass Congress, Dunnell was successful two years later by adding a rider to an existing agriculture appropriations bill. This legislation created the Office of Special Agent for forest research within the U.S. Department of Agriculture.

Wildfires were considered a primary threat to forests, as large expanses of timber had recently burned in fires such as Wisconsin's Peshtigo fire in 1871. Watershed protection was also a major concern, especially in the Adirondacks; supporters of watershed conservation pointed to the creation of the Adirondack and Catskill Preserve in 1885 as a potential model for future forest preserves. However, over 200 congressional forestry bills introduced from 1871 to 1891 failed to pass; according to historian Harold K. Steen, these failures were "not because of opposition but because there [were] too few advocates to sustain [them] through the legislative process."

== Passage ==
Dunnell continued to press for action, however, and intended to repeal the earlier Timber Culture Act, which had resulted in substantial land and timber fraud masquerading as homesteading, and replace it with an improved forest management law. Both provisions ended up in the final bill. The last section of the act signaled a shift in public land policy from disposal to retention by authorizing the president to set aside timber reserves:

Sec. 24. That the President of the United States may, from time to time, set apart and reserve, in any State or Territory having public land bearing forests, in any part of the public lands wholly or in part covered with timber or undergrowth, whether of commercial value or not, as public reservations; and the President shall, by public proclamation, declare the establishment of such reservations and the limits thereof.

The original section 24 was a rider added at the last minute to "An act to repeal timber culture laws, and for other purposes," a massive bill intended to reform public land law. It was added by a joint House-Senate conference committee, but was not referred back to the originating Public Lands Committee of either chamber and instead went straight to a floor vote. According to most historians, neither chamber was made aware of the existence of Section 24 before it being announced for consideration on the House and Senate floors.

The newly added section caused heated debate during deliberations. When it was being read aloud in the Senate, Senator Wilkinson Call of Florida interrupted the proceeding, saying "I shall not willingly vote or consent ... to any proposition which prevents a single acre of the public domain from being set apart and reserved for homes for the people of the United States who shall live upon and cultivate them." Other concerns were raised about the act's "extraordinary and dangerous" granting of power over public lands to the executive branch. In the House, Representative Dunnell argued that the added section was significant enough to warrant consideration on its own as a separate bill. Nevertheless, the act was ultimately passed by both chambers and subsequently signed into law by President Benjamin Harrison on March 3, 1891. Gifford Pinchot called it, "the most important legislation in the history of Forestry in America".

Additional provisions of the act included limiting homestead claims to fewer than 160 acres (although this acreage was insufficient for the arid conditions and necessary dry land farming of the region), limiting future claims other than mineral lands to fewer than 320 acres per person, and adjusting the Desert Land Act of 1877 more tightly for future land sales by requiring a greater degree of evidence of irrigation plans. As an added component, the General Revision Act of 1891 authorized the president (executive branch) to set apart and reserve forested lands as public reservations upon previously unclaimed land parcels. In addition to congressional support in Washington, the act's passage was supported by professional foresters and western water companies. Professional foresters supported limiting commercial over-exploitation of western timberlands, as they hoped to secure timber capital for future extraction and development. Similarly, western water companies supported the act on the grounds of increased watershed protection for irrigation purposes by the maintenance of previously forested lands.

== Subsequent actions ==
On March 30, less than a month after the act was passed, President Harrison established the Yellowstone Park Timberland Reserve to create a protective boundary around Yellowstone National Park. Harrison went on to set aside more than 13 million acres (53,000 km^{2}; 20,000 mi^{2}) as forest reserves, in addition to creating Sequoia, General Grant, and Yosemite National Parks.

President Cleveland continued Harrison's conservation policies by creating more than 25 million acres (100,000 km^{2}; 39,000 mi^{2}) of forest reserves. 21 million acres (85,000 km^{2}; 33,000 mi^{2}) of these were designated in a single day: Cleveland issued 13 separate proclamations on February 22, 1897, just two weeks before the end of his final term. This action generated a great deal of controversy in the affected states, mainly in the west; the Seattle Chamber of Commerce noted that even "King George had never attempted so high-handed an invasion upon the rights" of American citizens. The Republican-controlled Congress attempted to invalidate Cleveland's actions by passing an amendment to the Sundry Civil Appropriations Act, a critical funding bill, forcing the Democratic president to choose "between funding the federal government or preserving his forest reserves". Cleveland decided in favor of the government shutdown and pocket-vetoed the bill on his last day in office.

Congress made no further attempt to reverse Cleveland's actions or restrict the president from creating new reserves after Republican William McKinley took office on March 4. In fact, Congress reaffirmed executive authority to designate forest reserves, though the Organic Act of 1897 added language that required that any new reserves must protect forest or watersheds and "furnish a continuous supply of timber for the use and necessities of citizens of the United States". Although McKinley did reduce the size of a few of his predecessor's reserves, he ultimately expanded the nation's protected forest by over 7 million acres (28,000 km^{2}; 11,000 mi^{2}).

In 1905, President Theodore Roosevelt created the United States Forest Service, naming Gifford Pinchot the first agency chief. Pinchot was put in charge of the forest reserves to manage them "for the greatest good of the greatest number in the long run". In support of this directive, the Transfer Act of 1905 changed the jurisdiction of the reserves from the United States General Land Office in the Department of the Interior to the new Division of Forestry within the Department of Agriculture.

Two years later in 1907, Congress renamed forest reserves to national forests through provisions of an agriculture appropriations bill. In addition, the provisions prohibited the creation or enlargement of national forests in Colorado, Idaho, Montana, Oregon, Washington, and Wyoming, except by act of Congress. After the bill's passage by Congress on February 25, Chief Forester Pinchot and his staff raced to identify an additional 16 million acres (65,000 km^{2}; 25,000 mi^{2}) of forest in those states, which President Roosevelt designated as forest reserves prior to signing the act into law on March 4. In total, Roosevelt would quadruple the nation's forest reserves from 50 million acres (200,000 km^{2}; 78,000 mi^{2}) to nearly 200 million acres (810,000 km^{2}; 310,000 mi^{2}).

== Legacy and impact on public policy ==
From 1891 to 1900, over 50 million acres of land were withdrawn from private entities and added to the public domain following passage of the General Revision Act of 1891. Given the volume of land changing hands at this time, there was public debate over the scale of government purchasing activities of land. Specifically, the debate ranged between the privately held, expansionist and free market school of thought against a public oriented, protectionist and conservation camp. The argument for privatization is often cited alongside the growth of the railroad building activities, namely after the passage of the Pacific Railway Act of 1862. In this case, landowners could receive rent payments at a market driven price from the railroads anticipating western growth over privately held land plots. The induction of increased government held land is argued to reduce such rents and diminish the incentives for westward expansion. However, the protectionist argument sterns from the conservation of commodities such as timber, coal and phosphates. By arguing for the development of strategic reserves of such commodities, the protectionist view advocates the idea of delayed consumption best fitting the country's domestic demands.

Initially section 24 caused substantial confusion as to what the law specifically was intended to allow. The main issue was that the act only authorized the president to set aside forest reserves but not to administer them, nor designate any funding for their management. It also did not establish the purpose for these reserves. As a result, the first such reserves and the natural resources they contained were simply considered off-limits: activities such as logging and livestock grazing were forbidden, prohibitions were placed on hunting and fishing, and even setting foot inside the reserve boundaries was considered illegal. It was not until 1897, after many complaints and near-rebellion in the West, that Congress passed a new law (as an emergency rider to the Sundry Civil Appropriations Act of 1897) setting out guidelines and funding for the administration of the forest reserves.

The passage of the Forest Reserve Act, along with recent establishments of national parks and monuments, signaled a shift in public land policy, from disposal to homesteaders to retention for the public good. The natural resources these reserves contained were to be managed for future generations rather than exploited by private citizens. The act and subsequent environmental policies ultimately resulted in the establishment of 155 national forests, 20 national grasslands, and 20 research and experimental forests; these, plus additional special reservations, total 191 million acres (770,000 km^{2}; 298,000 mi^{2}) of public land.

== See also ==
- List of national forests of the United States
