= National forest (United States) =

Classification of federal lands in the United States

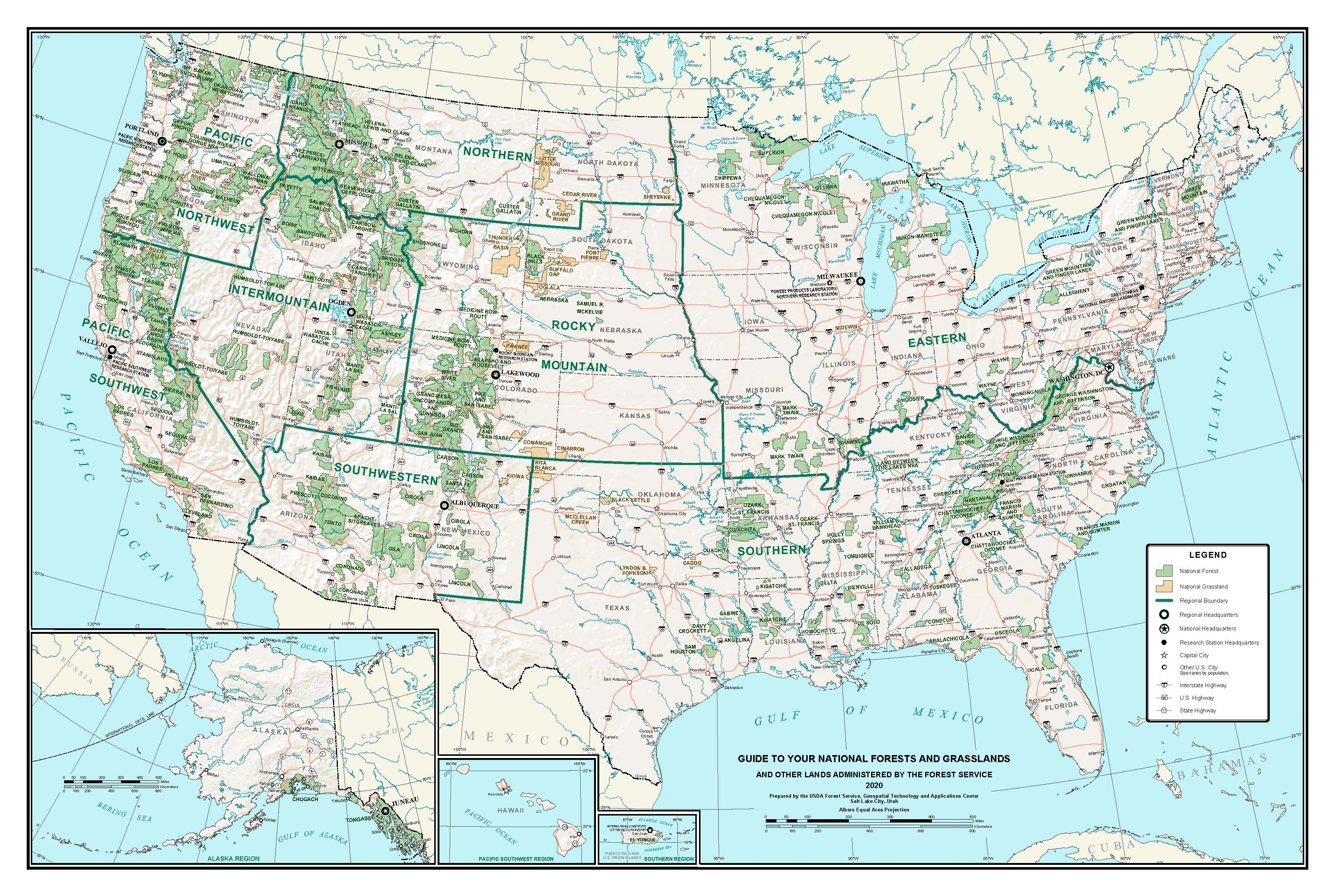
Map of national forests in the United States, depicted in green

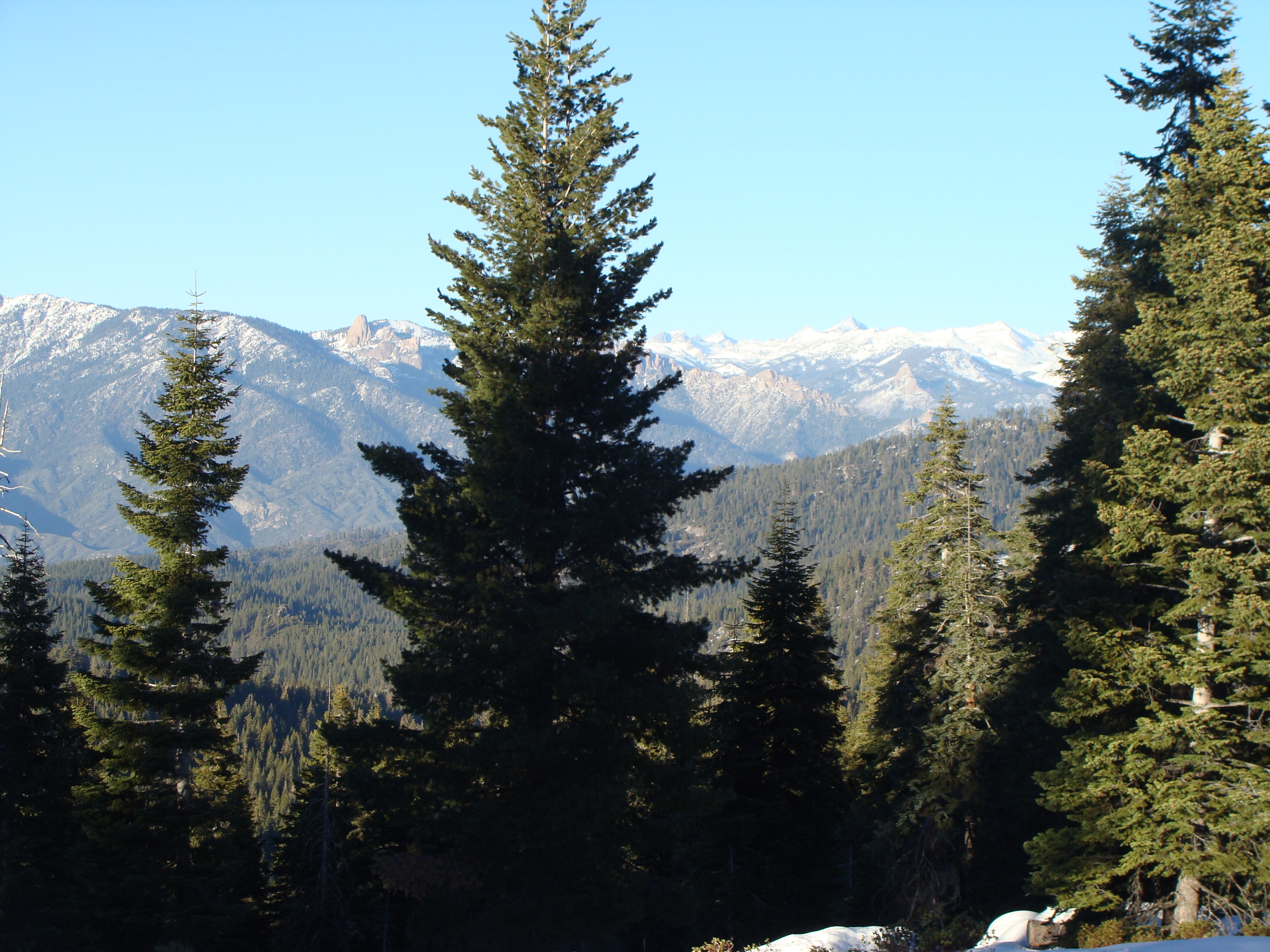
Sierra Nevada in the Sequoia National Forest, California

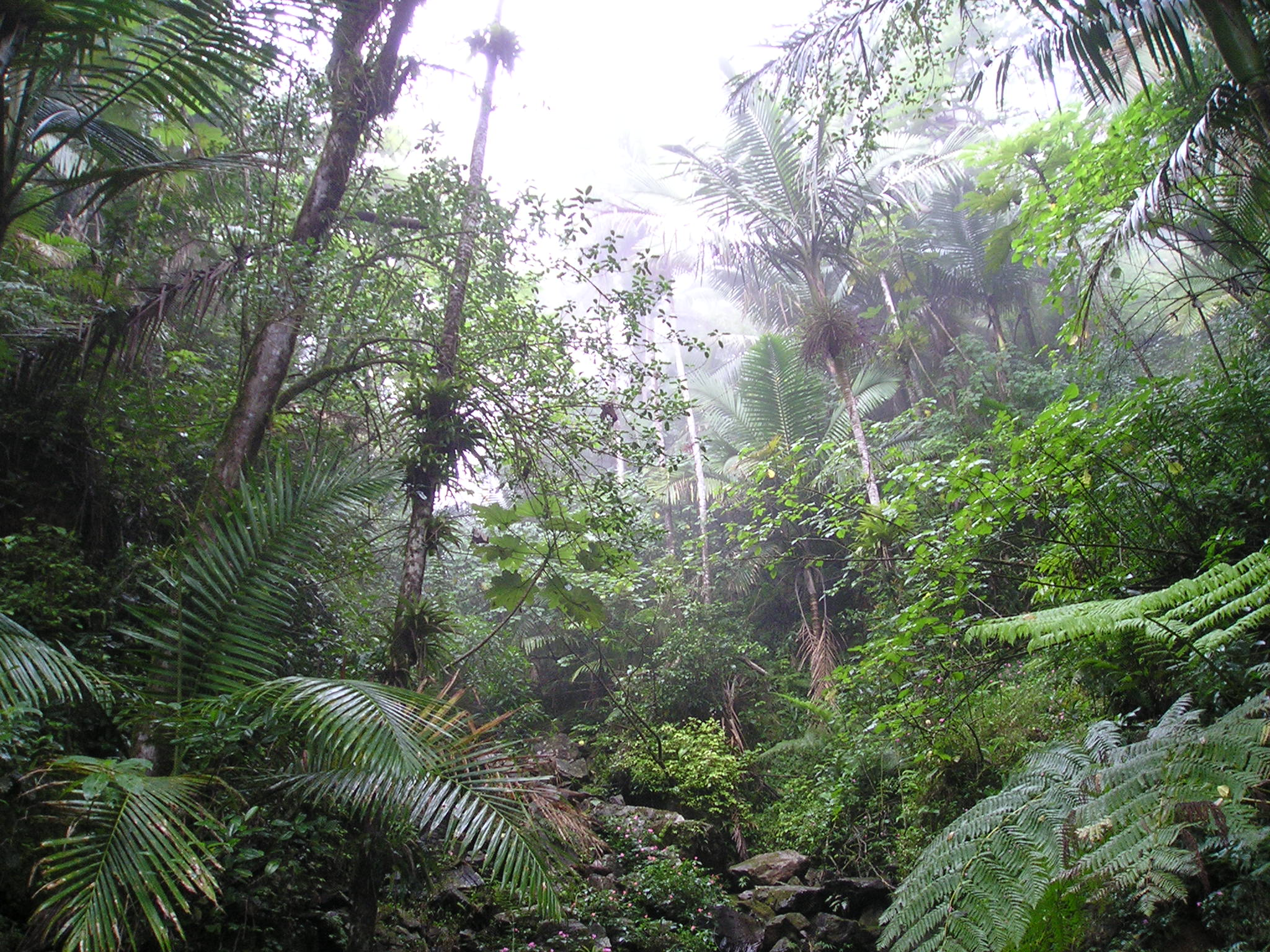
Rainforest in the El Yunque National Forest, Puerto Rico

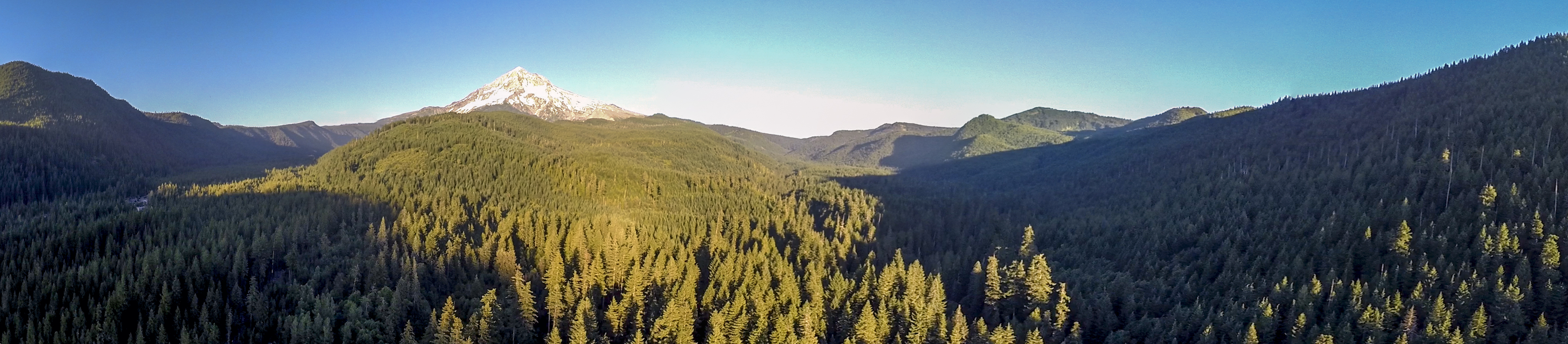
Mount Hood National Forest, Oregon

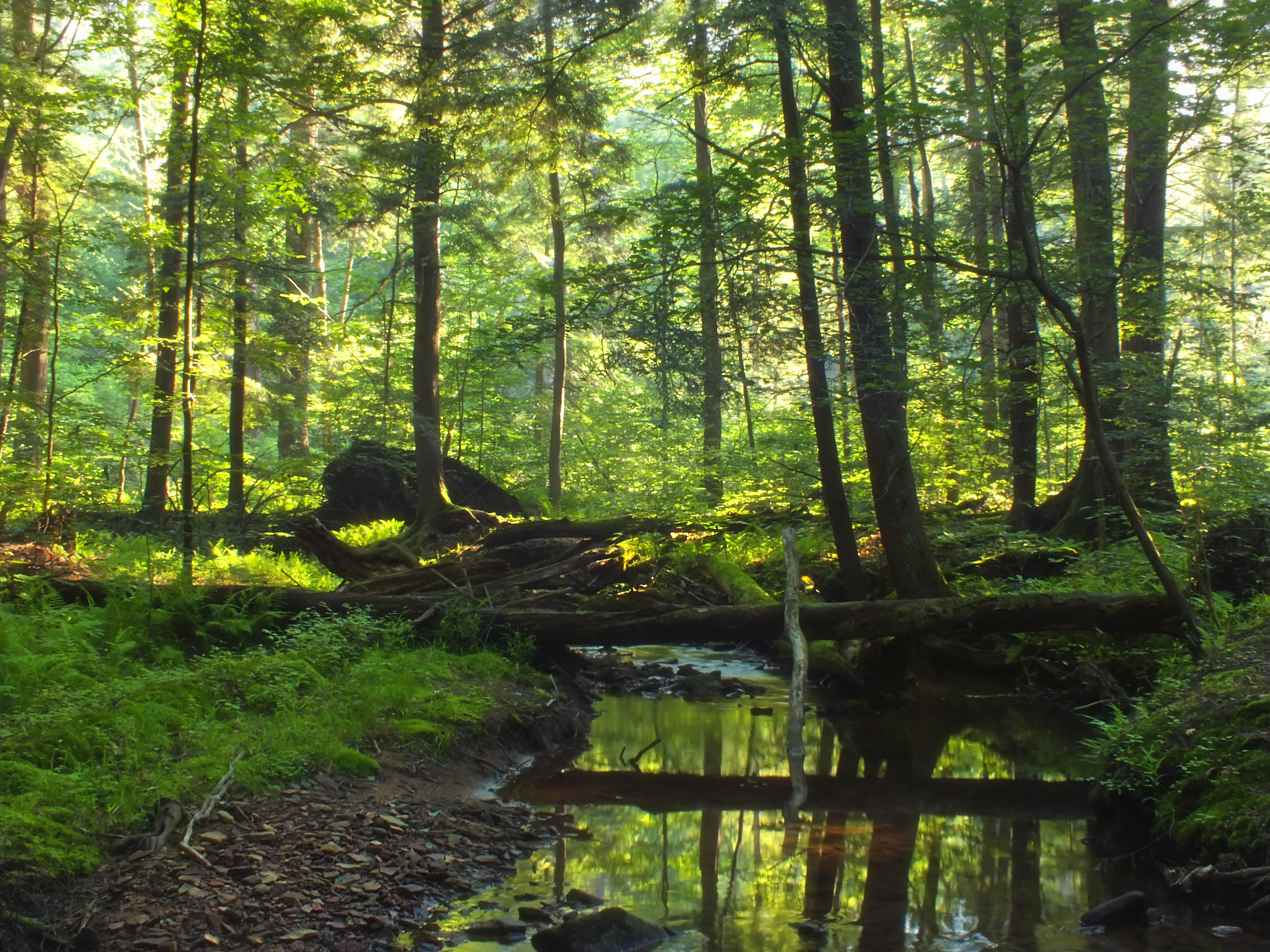
Allegheny National Forest, Pennsylvania

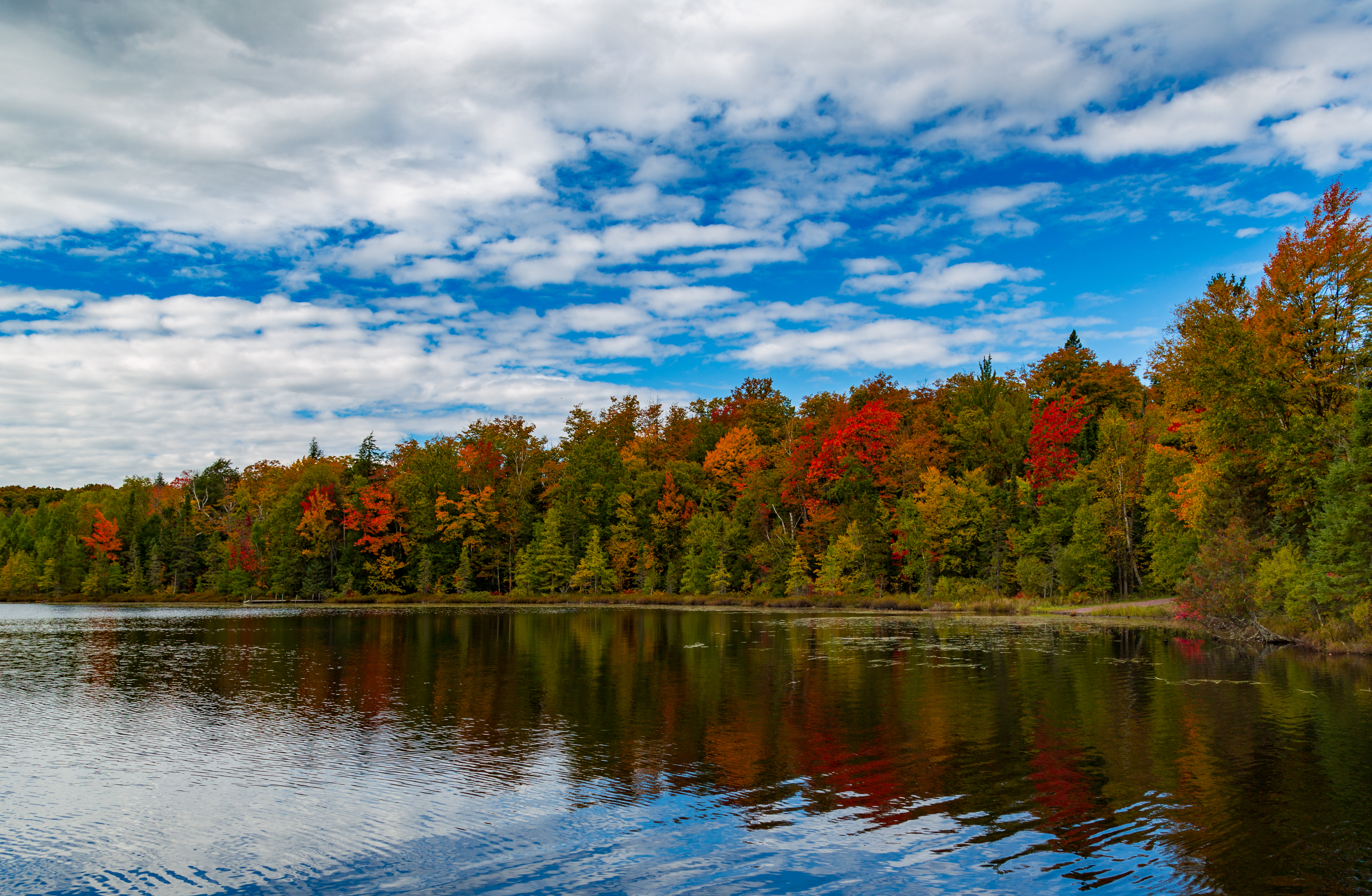
Fall colors in Ottawa National Forest, Michigan

In the United States, national forest is a classification of protected and managed federal lands that are largely forest and woodland areas. They are owned collectively by the American people through the federal government and managed by the United States Forest Service, a division of the United States Department of Agriculture. The U.S. Forest Service is also a forestry research organization that provides financial assistance to the state and local forestry industry. There are 154 national forests in the United States.

== History ==
The Land Revision Act of 1891, enacted during the presidency of Benjamin Harrison, allowed the president to set aside forest reserves on public lands. Harrison established 15 forest reserves containing more than 13 million acres of land. The bill was the result of concerted action by Los Angeles-area businessmen and property owners who were concerned by the harm being done to the watershed of the San Gabriel Mountains by ranchers and miners. Abbot Kinney and forester Theodore Lukens were key spokesmen for the effort.

=== Timeline of legislation ===
- 1897: The Organic Act was passed to protect watersheds and forests while still allowing the timber industry to continue.
- 1905: The Transfer Act of 1905 established the US Forest Service as a division of the United States Department of Agriculture (USDA). This agency was formed to map, maintain, and protect forests as well as provide water and timber for national benefit. Gifford Pinchot was appointed the head of the US Forest Service by President Roosevelt.
- 1907: 99 million acres were added to the national forests.
- 1922: The Secretary of Agriculture authorized the selling of national forest land in exchange for private land of equal value, which changed the national forest service from a conservation organization to one that focuses on the logging industry.
- 1925: National forests were authorized to grant grazing permits for 10 years.
- 1944: The Sustained-Yield Forest Management Act was passed, which encouraged the building of logging mills throughout the west.
- 1960: The Multiple-Use Sustained-Yield Act directs national forests to be managed for their timber, range, water, recreation, and wildlife, with no use greater than another.
- 1970: The National Environmental Policy Act was passed, which required the environmental impact statements to be made for federal actions that may impact the environment. This allowed a legal standing to challenge the logging industry.
- 1973: The Endangered Species Act passed, giving forest advocates a legal basis to challenge logging if it threatened an endangered species.
- 1976: The National Forest Management Act was enacted to protect lands and ecosystems. It was to protect national forests from destructive logging practices, so Congress told the Forest System to develop regulations on the size of clear-cuts, protect waterways, and restrict the cutting rate to protect reforestation.
- 1994: The Northwest Forest Plan was announced by President Bill Clinton to try to slow logging in old-growth forests.

There have been multiple legislative acts to expand the scope of the national forest system, as well as shrinking it. In 2020, the Trump administration encouraged more forest products to be harvested to support a struggling economy. There was a plan to develop around 190 million acres of protected National Forests to increase logging, grazing, and energy resources. This would be facilitated through shrinking the rules and regulations required to get permits to conduct such business. In October 2020, the Trump administration proclaimed its goal of "strengthening markets for wood products and incentivizing innovative manufacturing techniques" and reported "The Department of Agriculture’s Forest Service sold 3.3 billion board feet of timber from national forests in fiscal year 2019 — the highest output since 1997". Furthermore, President Trump signed an executive order to "establish the United States One Trillion Trees Interagency Council" in order to further the Federal Government's participation in this effort and repeal the current $30 million annual funding cap for the Reforestation Trust Fund.

== Geography ==
The United States national forest comprises about 132 million acres. There are 154 national forests and 20 national grasslands containing 193 million acres (297,000 mi^{2}/769 000 km^{2}) of land. These lands comprise 8.5 percent of the total land area of the United States, an area about the size of Texas. About 87 percent of national forest land lies in the Western United States, mostly in mountain ranges. Alaska has 12 percent of all national forest lands.

Within the national forest system, there are 1,200 sites listed on the National Register of Historic Places and 23 are National Historic Landmarks. The National Historic Preservation Act requires the Forest Service to identify, investigate, and protect cultural resources on lands it manages.

The U.S. Forest Service also manages all of the United States national grasslands and nearly 50% of the United States national recreation areas.

== Management ==
Land management of these areas focuses on conservation, timber harvesting, livestock grazing, watershed protection, wildlife, and recreation. Unlike national parks and other federal lands managed by the National Park Service, extraction of natural resources from national forests is permitted, and in many cases encouraged. Forest products are the resources removed and harvested from national forests. They may be for commercial or personal use such as “lumber, paper, and firewood as well as 'special forest products' such as medicinal herbs, fungi, edible fruits and nuts, and other natural products”. However, the first-designated wilderness areas, and some of the largest, are on national forest lands.

There are management decision conflicts between conservationists and environmentalists and natural resource extraction companies and lobbies (e.g. logging & mining) over the protection and/or use of national forest lands. These conflicts center on endangered species protection, logging of old-growth forests, intensive clear cut logging, undervalued stumpage fees, mining operations and mining claim laws, and logging/mining access roadbuilding within national forests. Additional conflicts arise from concerns that the grasslands, shrublands, and forest understory are grazed by sheep, cattle, and more recently, rising numbers of elk and mule deer due to loss of predators.

Many ski resorts and summer resorts operate on leased land in national forests.

National forests include 14 national monuments where resource extraction is restricted.

== See also ==
- Weeks Act 1911 law for purchase of private lands
  - Clarke–McNary Act, an expansion in 1924
- Environmental history of the United States
- Protected areas of the United States
- State forest
- National forests of the United States topics
