= H.R. 3109 (113th Congress) =

- Long title: An Act to amend the Migratory Bird Treaty Act to exempt certain Alaskan Native articles from prohibitions against sale of items containing nonedible migratory bird parts, and for other purposes.
- Announced in: the 113th United States Congress
- Sponsored by: Rep. Don Young (R, AK-0)
- Number of co-sponsors: 0

Codification
- U.S.C. sections affected: 16 U.S.C. § 703

Legislative history
- Introduced in the House as H.R. 3109 by Rep. Don Young (R, AK-0) on September 17, 2013; Committee consideration by United States House Committee on Natural Resources, United States House Natural Resources Subcommittee on Fisheries, Wildlife, Oceans and Insular Affairs; Passed the House on September 8, 2014 (voice vote)

A bill to amend the Migratory Bird Treaty Act to exempt certain Alaskan Native articles from prohibitions against sale of items containing nonedible migratory bird parts, and for other purposes (H.R. 3109) was a proposed law that would have allowed Alaskan Natives to make and sell traditional handicrafts such as masks, jewelry, clothing, and hunting equipment that are made from parts of migratory birds, particularly feathers.

H.R. 3109 was introduced and passed in the United States House of Representatives during the 113th United States Congress. It was not passed in the Senate, and expired at the conclusion of the 113th United States Congress.

== Background ==
The Migratory Bird Treaty Act of 1918 (MBTA), codified at 16 U.S.C. §§ 703–712, is a United States federal law, first enacted in 1916 in order to implement the convention for the protection of migratory birds between the United States and Great Britain (acting on behalf of Canada). The statute makes it unlawful without a waiver to pursue, hunt, take, capture, kill or sell birds listed therein ("migratory birds"). The statute does not discriminate between live or dead birds and also grants full protection to any bird parts including feathers, eggs and nests. Over 800 species are currently on the list. The U.S. Fish and Wildlife Service issues permits for otherwise prohibited activities under the act. These include permits for taxidermy, falconry, propagation, scientific and educational use, and depredation, an example of the latter being the killing of geese near an airport, where they pose a danger to aircraft.

== Provisions of the bill ==
This summary is based largely on the summary provided by the Congressional Research Service, a public domain source.

H.R. 3109 would amend the Migratory Bird Treaty Act to provide that nothing in such Act prohibits possessing, selling, bartering, purchasing, shipping, and transporting any authentic Alaskan Native article of handicraft or clothing on the basis that it contains a nonedible migratory bird part. Makes such exemption inapplicable with respect to any handicraft or clothing containing any part of a migratory bird that was taken in a wasteful manner.

H.R. 3109 would define "authentic Alaskan Native article of handicraft or clothing" to mean any item that is composed of natural materials and produced, decorated, or fashioned by an Alaskan Native (Indian, Aleut, or Eskimo who resides in Alaska), in the exercise of traditional Alaskan Native handicrafts, without the use of any pantograph or other mass copying device, including any weaving, carving, stitching, sewing, lacing, beading, drawing, or painting.

== Congressional Budget Office report ==
This summary is based largely on the summary provided by the Congressional Budget Office, as ordered reported by the House Committee on Natural Resources on July 30, 2014. This is a public domain source.

H.R. 3109 would amend the Migratory Bird Treaty Act to allow Alaskan Natives to make and sell traditional handicrafts such as masks, jewelry, clothing, and hunting equipment that are made from parts of migratory birds, particularly feathers. The Congressional Budget Office (CBO) estimates that implementing the bill would not have a significant effect on the federal budget.

Because enacting the legislation could reduce revenues and associated direct spending from civil and criminal penalties, pay-as-you-go procedures apply. However, CBO estimates that any such effects would be negligible.

H.R. 3109 contains no intergovernmental or private-sector mandates as defined in the Unfunded Mandates Reform Act and would not affect the budgets of state, local, or tribal governments.

== Procedural history ==
H.R. 3109 was introduced into the United States House of Representatives on September 17, 2013 by Rep. Don Young (R, AK-0). It was referred to the United States House Committee on Natural Resources and the United States House Natural Resources Subcommittee on Fisheries, Wildlife, Oceans and Insular Affairs. On September 8, 2014, the bill passed the House in a voice vote.

== Debate and discussion ==
In testimony before Congress, a spokesperson for the United States Department of the Interior (DOI) stated that it "does not support H.R. 3109." According to the spokesperson, "in 1886, 5 million birds were estimated to be killed for their feathers." The goal of the Migratory Bird Treaty Act was to end "the commercial trade in birds and their feathers that, by the early years of the 20th century, had devastated populations of many native bird species." The Department did acknowledge, however, "the economic and cultural need in Alaska Native communities to improve their quality of life with opportunities to benefit from their unique handicrafts and other traditional items."

== See also ==
- List of bills in the 113th United States Congress
