= Conservation Security Program =

American conservation program

The Conservation Security Program (CSP) was a voluntary conservation program in the United States that supported stewardship of private agricultural lands by providing payments and technical assistance for maintaining and enhancing natural resources. The program promoted the conservation and improvement of soil, water, air, energy, plant and animal life, and other conservation purposes. Congress established the CSP under the Farm Security and Rural Investment Act of 2002 (FSRIA), which amended the Food Security Act of 1985. The program was administered by the Natural Resources Conservation Service (NRCS), an agency of the United States Department of Agriculture (USDA).

In 2008 Congress enacted the 2008 Farm Bill and replaced the Conservation Security Program with the similarly named, but differently structured Conservation Stewardship Program. In FY 2024 the Conservation Stewardship Program had $364,090,393 obligated in 5,268 contracts with producers which was 20 percent of the Soil and Water Conservation Act (RCA) programs.

== Program coverage ==
The CSP was used on Tribal and private working lands. All 50 states and U.S. territories in the Caribbean and Pacific basins had incorporated the CSP. The program provides equitable access to benefit all producers, regardless of size of operation, crops produced, or geographic location. The CSP helps producers maintain conservation stewardship and implement additional conservation practices that provide added environmental enhancement, while creating powerful incentives for other producers to meet those same standards of conservation performance. The NRCS believes "The conservation benefits gained will help farms and ranches be more environmentally sustainable and will increase the natural resources benefits provided to all Americans."

== Program tiers ==
Participants in the CSP sign a Conservation Security Contract stating which of the three levels (also referred to as tiers) of conservation they will maintain on lands in production in return for annual payments.

- Level I is a 5-year contract of up to $20,000 annually to address at least one conservation problem on a portion of a farm.
- Level II is a 5- to 10-year contract of up to $35,000 annually to address at least one conservation problem on an entire farm.
- Level III is a 5-to 10-year contract of up to $45,000 annually to address all conservation problems on an entire farm.

== Program functions ==
Producers determined whether they were located in an eligible watershed, and then completed a self-assessment, including a description of conservation activities on their operations, to help determine their eligibility for CSP at the time. Based on the application, description of current conservation activities, and the interview, NRCS determined CSP eligibility and in which program tier and enrollment category the applicant may participate.

During the first year the program was in operation about 9,000 people contacted a field office or attended a local workshop about the CSP the first year. About 4,800 producer requests were registered at the local field office. Of these, 2,800 complete the self-assessment put forth by the program and made application towards the program. And finally, 2,180 contracts were approved as eligible for the Conservation Security Program. The USDA actually accepted all eligible CSP applications that were submitted during the first sign-up period.

== Eligibility ==
The CSP required that the land must be privately owned or Tribal land and the majority of the land must be located within one of the selected watersheds. Also, the applicant must be in compliance with highly erodible and wetland provisions of the Food Security Act of 1985, have an active interest in the agricultural operation, and have control of the land for the life of the contract. The applicant for the CSP must also share in the risk of producing any crop or livestock and be entitled to share in the crop or livestock marketed for the operation.

== Watersheds ==
The NRCS implemented the CSP on a watershed basis instead of a nationwide basis because they believed a staged, watershed-based implementation of CSP made the most sense – economically, practically, and administratively. They feel that focusing on high priority watersheds will reduce the administrative burden on applicants, and will reduce the costs of processing a large number of applications that cannot be funded. Also, the NRCS expects that a significant number of producers will seek participation in the Conservation Security Program and ask for assistance to determine their potential eligibility for the program. By law, the NRCS cannot incur technical assistance costs in excess of 15 percent of the funds expended in that fiscal year for the CSP. Given this modest service funding, the NRCS must focus and limit the land and landowners that its conservations can serve at one time. Offering the Conservation Security Program in only selected watersheds provides that focus.

In fiscal year 2004, 18 watersheds from across the Nation were selected as part of the Conservation Security Program. In 2005, the number of watersheds increased drastically to 202 to have at least one per state and the Caribbean area. As the CSP expands, other watersheds will be selected each year with the input of the State Conservationists, until landowners in every watershed have had a chance to participate.

NRCS used watershed prioritization to determine specific areas eligible for accepting CSP applications in each sign-up. The NRCS nationally prioritizes the watershed based on a score derived from a composite index of existing natural resource, environmental quality, and agricultural activity data. The watershed prioritization and identification process considers several factors. Some of these factors include vulnerability of surface and ground water quality. Also, potential for excessive soil quality degradation and condition of grazing land are also factors that are considering in determining the watersheds used for the Conservation Security Program.
