= Agricultural Appropriation Act of 1923 =

United States federal law

- Long title: An Act Making appropriations for the Department of Agriculture for the fiscal year ending June 30, 1923, and for other purposes.
- Enacted by: the 67th United States Congress

Citations
- Statutes at Large: 42 Stat. 507

Legislative history
- Introduced in the House as H.R. 10730

The public Act number 217, sometimes called the Agricultural Appropriation Act of 1923, is an Act of the 67th United States Congress, which was passed on 11 May 1922, and which relates to the fiscal year 1923. This Act is chapter 185 of the Second Session of the 67th Congress. The Bill for this Act was H.R. 10730. The Act is part of United States federal law.

This Act merged the Bureau of Markets and Crop Estimates (BMCE) with the Office of Farm Management and Farm Economics (OFMFE) on July 1, 1922, to form the Bureau of Agricultural Economics (BAE). Its purpose was to analyze and receive reports relating to foreign agriculture. It was the central statistical and economic research agency of the Commerce Department, which was responsible for collecting, analyzing, and publishing a wide variety of facts about agriculture. This included data on production, supply and demand, consumption, prices, costs and income, marketing, transportation, labor, agricultural finance, farm management, credit, taxation, land and water utilization, and other aspects of agricultural production and distribution.

Two provisos to a paragraph of this Act are codified in section 556 of the Title 16 of the United States Code.
