= Clarke–McNary Act =

United States federal law concerning mass afforestation

- Other short titles: Clarke-McNary Forestry Act of 1924
- Long title: An Act to provide for the protection of forest lands, for the reforestation of denuded areas, for the extension of national forests, and for other purposes, in order to promote the continuous production of timber on lands chiefly suitable therefor
- Enacted by: the 68th United States Congress

Citations
- Public law: Pub. L. 68–270
- Statutes at Large: 43 Stat. 653

Codification
- Acts amended: Weeks Act (1911)
- Titles amended: 16

Legislative history
- Introduced in the House as H.R. 4830 by John D. Clarke; Committee consideration by House Agriculture; Passed the House on; Passed the Senate on; Signed into law by President Calvin Coolidge on June 7, 1924

The Clarke–McNary Act of 1924 (ch. 348, 43 Stat. 653, enacted June 7, 1924) was one of several pieces of United States federal legislation which expanded the Weeks Act of 1911, and was named for Representative John D. Clarke and Senator Charles McNary.

The 1911 Weeks Act had allowed the purchase of land to enlarge the National Forest System. Two years after the Weeks Act was passed, over 700,000 acres (2,800 km^{2}) had been purchased for the National Forest system in the Eastern United States. More than 2 million acres (8,000 km^{2}) of land had been purchased by 1920.

The Clarke–McNary Act made it much easier for the Forest Service to buy land from willing sellers within predetermined national forest boundaries. It enabled the Secretary of Agriculture to work cooperatively with State officials for better forest protection, chiefly in fire control and water resources. It also provided for continuous production of timber. Additionally, the United States Department of Agriculture (USDA) began working with private forestland owners in reforestation. That was done by broadening the cooperative efforts to include producing and distributing tree seedlings and providing forestry assistance to farmers.

The laws also gave a strong impetus to states to establish and to support state forestry agencies. All 50 states now have a state forestry agency or forestry extension agency.
