= St. Rose Academy (Mayfield, Pennsylvania) =

Coordinates: 41.54812°N 75.53250°W

Saint Rose Academy
- Mayfield, Pennsylvania

Information
- Type: Private, Coeducational
- Established: 2005
- Closed: October 22, 2010
- Grades: 7–12
- Colors: Black and Maroon
- Team name: Phoenix

Saint Rose Academy was a private high school in Mayfield, Pennsylvania. It was located within the Roman Catholic Diocese of Scranton, however as it did not operate under the blessings of the Bishop, it was never officially a Catholic school.

== Background ==
The school was established in 2005 to replace Sacred Heart High School, which the Diocese elected to close after the 2004–2005 school year. The new school was not operated with the blessing of the Bishop and was not considered a Catholic school. However, the school currilculm did follow Catholic theology and was mostly attended by Catholic students. In 2010, mounting financial troubles including a lawsuit by teachers who weren't being paid appropriately, a default on building loans, and not being current on federal taxes forced the building to be sold at a sheriff's sale auction.

== Closure ==
St. Rose Academy closed on October 22, 2010. An official document from the administration cited "low enrollment" and "mounting financial obligations" as the main reasons why the school had to close. Informally, it was circulated through the community that fears about the loss of clear title to the building over the summer caused the hard-earned and gradually increasing enrollment of about 75 to plummet to just over 30, which consequently put the school's budget out of its means, as its income was slashed in half. The announcement of closure came suddenly after plans were made to move back into the three-story 1950s-style Sacred Heart High School building in center-city Carbondale, which has remained vacant since the closure of Sacred Heart High School in 2005.
