= Title 16 of the United States Code =

U.S. federal statutes on conservation

Title 16 of the United States Code outlines the role of conservation in the United States Code.

- 16 U.S.C. ch. 1—National Parks, Military Parks, Monuments, and Seashores (the "National Park Service Organic Act")
- 16 U.S.C. ch. 1A—Historic Sites, Buildings, Objects, and Antiquities
- 16 U.S.C. ch. 1B—Archaeological Resources Protection
- 16 U.S.C. ch. 2—National Forests
- 16 U.S.C. ch. 3—Forests; Forest Service; Reforestation; Management
  - Section 556 codifies the second and third provisos to the paragraph of the Act of 11 May 1922, ch. 185, H.R. 10730, sometimes called the Agriculture Department Appropriation Act of 1923 or the Agriculture Appropriation Act 1923, that starts on page 520 and finishes on page 521. The two provisos are cited as, and are at, 42 Stat. 521. The section relates to "Traveling Expenses - Publication Activities"; and, in particular, to the use for transportation or traveling expenses, or for the preparation or publication of newspaper or magazine articles, of appropriations for the Forest Service. This provision was amended by section 8 of the Act of 20 June 1958, Public Law 85–464, 72 Stat. 218. The said two provisos in the Agriculture Department Appropriation Act of 1923 replaced (with the addition of the word "hereafter") the corresponding similar provisions in the fourteen previous Agriculture Appropriation Acts, beginning with the provisos at 35 Stat. 259 in the Act of 23 May 1908, 35 Stat. 251, sometimes called the Agriculture Appropriation Act of 1909 or the Agricultural Appropriation Act of 1909.
- 16 U.S.C. ch. 3A—Unemployment Relief Through Performance of Useful Public Work
- 16 U.S.C. ch. 3B—Soil Conservation
- 16 U.S.C. ch. 3C—Water Conservation
- 16 U.S.C. ch. 4—Protection of Timber, and Depredations
  - This chapter codifies the Forest Pest Control Act, the Federal Timber Contract Payment Modification Act, the Forest Resources Conservation and Shortage Relief Act of 1990, the Forest Resources Conservation and Shortage Relief Amendment Act of 1993, and the Forest Resources Conservation and Shortage Relief Act of 1997.
  - Sections 604 to 606 codify the Act of 3 June 1878, ch. 150, 20 Stat. 88, popularly called the Mineral Land Free Timber Act, or the Nonsale Disposals Act of 1878, and also called the Timber Cutting Act.
  - Sections 614 and 615 of this chapter formerly codified the Act of 4 March 1913, ch. 165, 37 Stat. 1015, commonly called the Burnt Timber Act. This Act "authorized the Secretary of the Interior to sell from the public lands timber which had been killed or damaged by fire". The Bill for this Act was H.R. 24266. This Act was amended by the Act of 3 July 1926, ch. 779, 44 Stat. 890. The Burnt Timber Act is no longer in force, having been repealed on 25 September 1962 by section 2 of Public Law 87–689, subject to the saving in that section. There was previously a Burnt Timber Act of 19 January 1895 (28 Stat. 634).
- 16 U.S.C. ch. 5—Protection of Fur Seals and Other Fur-Bearing Animals
- 16 U.S.C. ch. 5A—Protection and Conservation of Wildlife
- 16 U.S.C. ch. 5B—Wildlife Restoration
- 16 U.S.C. ch. 5C—Conservation Programs on Government Lands
- 16 U.S.C. ch. 6—Game and Bird Preserves; Protection
- 16 U.S.C. ch. 7—Protection of Migratory Game and Insectivorous Birds
- 16 U.S.C. ch. 8—Upper Mississippi River National Wildlife and Fish Refuge
- 16 U.S.C. ch. 9—Fish and Wildlife Service
- 16 U.S.C. ch. 9A—Preservation of Fishery Resources
- 16 U.S.C. ch. 10—Northern Pacific Halibut Fishing
- 16 U.S.C. ch. 10A—Sockeye or Pink Salmon Fishing
- 16 U.S.C. ch. 10B—Fish Restoration and Management Projects
- 16 U.S.C. ch. 10C—Fish Research and Experimentation Program
- 16 U.S.C. ch. 10D—State Commercial Fisheries Research and Development Projects
- 16 U.S.C. ch. 11—Regulation of Landing, Curing, and Sale of Sponges Taken From Gulf of Mexico and Straits of Florida
- 16 U.S.C. ch. 12—Federal Regulation and Development of Power
- 16 U.S.C. ch. 12A—Tennessee Valley Authority
- 16 U.S.C. ch. 12B—Bonneville Project
- 16 U.S.C. ch. 12C—Fort Peck Project
- 16 U.S.C. ch. 12D—Columbia Basin Project
- 16 U.S.C. ch. 12E—Niagara Power Project
- 16 U.S.C. ch. 12F—Pacific Northwest Consumer Power Preference; Reciprocal Priority in Other Regions
- 16 U.S.C. ch. 12G—Pacific Northwest Federal Transmission System
- 16 U.S.C. ch. 12H—Pacific Northwest Electric Power Planning and Conservation
- 16 U.S.C. ch. 13—Regulation of Transportation in Interstate or Foreign Commerce of Black Bass and Other Fish
- 16 U.S.C. ch. 14—Regulation of Whaling
- 16 U.S.C. ch. 14A—Whale Conservation and Protection
- 16 U.S.C. ch. 15—Predatory Sea Lampreys in the Great Lakes
- 16 U.S.C. ch. 15A—Great Lakes Fisheries
- 16 U.S.C. ch. 15B—Great Lakes Fish and Wildlife Restoration
- 16 U.S.C. ch. 15C—Great Lakes Fish and Wildlife Tissue Bank
- 16 U.S.C. ch. 16—Tuna Conventions
- 16 U.S.C. ch. 16A—Atlantic Tunas Convention
- 16 U.S.C. ch. 16B—Eastern Pacific Tuna Fishing
- 16 U.S.C. ch. 16C—South Pacific Tuna Fishing
- 16 U.S.C. ch. 17—Northwest Atlantic Fisheries
- 16 U.S.C. ch. 18—Watershed Protection and Flood Prevention
- 16 U.S.C. ch. 19—North Pacific Fisheries
- 16 U.S.C. ch. 20—National Fisheries Center and Aquarium
- 16 U.S.C. ch. 21—Prohibition of Foreign Fishing Vessels in the – Territorial Waters of the United States
- 16 U.S.C. ch. 21A—Fisheries Zone Contiguous to Territorial Sea of the United States
- 16 U.S.C. ch. 21B—Prohibition of Certain Foreign Fishing Vessels in United States Fisheries
- 16 U.S.C. ch. 21C—Offshore Shrimp Fisheries
- 16 U.S.C. ch. 22—International Parks
- 16 U.S.C. ch. 23—National Wilderness Preservation System
- 16 U.S.C. ch. 24—Conservation and Protection of North Pacific Fur Seals
- 16 U.S.C. ch. 25—Jellyfish or Sea nettles, Other Such Pests, and Seaweed in Coastal Waters: Control or Elimination
- 16 U.S.C. ch. 25A—Crown of Thorns Starfish
- 16 U.S.C. ch. 25B—Reefs for Marine Life Conservation
- 16 U.S.C. ch. 26—Estuarine Areas
- 16 U.S.C. ch. 27—National Trails System
- 16 U.S.C. ch. 27A—National Recreational Trails Fund
- 16 U.S.C. ch. 28—Wild and Scenic Rivers
- 16 U.S.C. ch. 29—Water Bank Program for Wetlands Preservation
- 16 U.S.C. ch. 30—Wild Horses and Burros: Protection, Management, and Control
- 16 U.S.C. ch. 31—Marine Mammal Protection
- 16 U.S.C. ch. 32—Marine Sanctuaries
- 16 U.S.C. ch. 32A—Regional Marine Research Programs
- 16 U.S.C. ch. 33—Coastal Zone Management
- 16 U.S.C. ch. 34—Rural Environmental Conservation Program
- 16 U.S.C. ch. 35—Endangered Species
- 16 U.S.C. ch. 36—Forest and Rangeland Renewable Resources Planning
- 16 U.S.C. ch. 37—Youth Conservation Corps and Public Lands Corps
- 16 U.S.C. ch. 38—Fishery Conservation And Management
- 16 U.S.C. ch. 39—Mining Activity Within National Park System Areas
- 16 U.S.C. ch. 40—Soil and Water Resources Conservation
- 16 U.S.C. ch. 41—Cooperative Forestry Assistance
- 16 U.S.C. ch. 42—Emergency Conservation Program
- 16 U.S.C. ch. 43—Public Transportation Programs for National Park System Areas
- 16 U.S.C. ch. 44—Antarctic Conservation
- 16 U.S.C. ch. 44A—Antarctic Marine Living Resources Convention
- 16 U.S.C. ch. 44B—Antarctic Mineral Resources Protection
- 16 U.S.C. ch. 45—Urban Park and Recreation Recovery Program
- 16 U.S.C. ch. 46—Public Utility Regulatory Policies
- 16 U.S.C. ch. 47—Small Hydroelectric Power Projects
- 16 U.S.C. ch. 48—National Aquaculture Policy, Planning, and Development
- 16 U.S.C. ch. 49—Fish and Wildlife Conservation
- 16 U.S.C. ch. 50—Chesapeake Bay Research Coordination
- 16 U.S.C. ch. 51—Alaska National Interest Lands Conservation
- 16 U.S.C. ch. 52—Salmon and Steelhead Conservation and Enhancement
- 16 U.S.C. ch. 53—Control of Illegally Taken Fish And Wildlife
- 16 U.S.C. ch. 54—Resource Conservation
- 16 U.S.C. ch. 55—Coastal Barrier Resources
- 16 U.S.C. ch. 56—North Atlantic Salmon Fishing
- 16 U.S.C. ch. 56A—Pacific Salmon Fishing
- 16 U.S.C. ch. 57—National Fish and Wildlife Foundation
- 16 U.S.C. ch. 57A—Partnerships For Wildlife
- 16 U.S.C. ch. 58—Erodible Land and Wetland Conservation and Reserve Program
- 16 U.S.C. ch. 59—Wetlands Resources
- 16 U.S.C. ch. 59A—Wetlands
- 16 U.S.C. ch. 60—Fish and Seafood Promotion
- 16 U.S.C. ch. 61—Interjurisdictional Fisheries
- 16 U.S.C. ch. 62—African Elephant Conservation
- 16 U.S.C. ch. 62A—Asian Elephant Conservation
- 16 U.S.C. ch. 63—Federal Cave Resources Protection
- 16 U.S.C. ch. 64—North American Wetlands Conservation
- 16 U.S.C. ch. 65—International Forestry Cooperation
- 16 U.S.C. ch. 66—Take Pride in America Program
- 16 U.S.C. ch. 67—Aquatic Nuisance Prevention and Control
- 16 U.S.C. ch. 68—Pacific Yew Conservation and Management
- 16 U.S.C. ch. 69—Wild Exotic Bird Conservation
- 16 U.S.C. ch. 70—North Pacific Anadromous Stocks Convention
- 16 U.S.C. ch. 71—Atlantic Coastal Fisheries Cooperative Management
- 16 U.S.C. ch. 71A—Atlantic Striped Bass Conservation
- 16 U.S.C. ch. 72—Recreational Hunting Safety
- 16 U.S.C. ch. 73—Rhinoceros and Tiger Conservation
- 16 U.S.C. ch. 74—National Maritime Heritage
- 16 U.S.C. ch. 75—High Seas Fishing Compliance
- 16 U.S.C. ch. 76—Northwest Atlantic Fisheries Convention
- 16 U.S.C. ch. 77—Yukon River Salmon
- 16 U.S.C. ch. 78—National Natural Resources Conservation Foundation
- 16 U.S.C. ch. 79—National Park Service Management
- 16 U.S.C. ch. 80—Neotropical Migratory Bird Conservation
- 16 U.S.C. ch. 81—User Fees Under Forest System Recreation Residence Program
- 16 U.S.C. ch. 81A—National Forest Organizational Camp Fee Improvement
- 16 U.S.C. ch. 82—Great Ape Conservation
- 16 U.S.C. ch. 83—Coral Reef Conservation
- 16 U.S.C. ch. 84—Healthy Forest Restoration
- 16 U.S.C. ch. 85—Marine Turtle Conservation
- 16 U.S.C. ch. 86—Southwest Forest Health and Wildfire Prevention
- 16 U.S.C. ch. 87—Federal Lands Recreation Enhancement
