= Organic Act of 1897 =

Environment law

- Other short titles: Forest Service Organic Administration Act of 1897
- Long title: An Act making appropriations for sundry civil expenses of the Government for the fiscal year ending June thirtieth, eighteen hundred and ninety-eight, and for other purposes.
- Nicknames: Pettigrew Amendment
- Enacted by: the 54th United States Congress
- Effective: June 4, 1897

Citations
- Statutes at Large: 30 Stat. 34-36

Codification
- Acts amended: National Forest Management Act of 1976
- U.S.C. sections created: 16 U.S.C. §§ 473–478, §§ 479–482, § 551

Legislative history
- Introduced in the Senate (as amendment to appropriations bill) as Sundry Civil Appropriations Act of 1897 by Sen. Richard F. Pettigrew (D–SD) on 1897; Committee consideration by Conference committee (House–Senate reconciliation); Passed the Senate on 1897; Passed the House on 1897; Signed into law by President William McKinley on June 4, 1897

The Forest Service Organic Administration Act of 1897 provided the main statutory basis for the management of forest reserves in the United States, hence the commonly used term "Organic Act". The legislation's formal title is the Sundry Civil Appropriations Act of 1897, which was signed into law on June 4, 1897, by President William McKinley.

== Background ==
This law was the first step toward legislation concerning the management, protection and care of the nation's forest reserves. Its features include:

1. It specified the purpose for establishing reserves as well as the administration and protection.
2. It granted the Secretary of the United States Department of the Interior the authority in rule-making and regulations of reserves.
3. It allowed the United States General Land Office (GLO) to hire employees for the necessary administrative tasks and opened the reserves for public use.
4. It specifically stated the criteria for new forest reserve designations, which were timber production, watershed protection and forest protection.
5. It gave the United States Geological Survey (USGS) the responsibility for mapping the reserves.

This last item gave two separate branches of the Department of Interior responsibility-The GLO for the sale, claims and administration of the reserves and the USGS for the drawing of boundaries and land maps.

According to the Organic Act, the intention of the forest reservations was "to improve and protect the forest within the reservation, ... securing favorable conditions of water flows, and to furnish a continuous supply of timber for the use and necessities of citizens of the United States."

This law is one of two of the most important legislative events in US Forest Service history (the other being the Transfer Act of 1905). The nation now had forest reserves and the means to protect and manage them. The basic elements of federal forestry were now established.

== Interior Department changes ==
As instructed by the new law, a Division of Geography and Forestry was set up within the USGS. Henry Gannet was the new division's chief and produced surveys of the reserves that were of high quality and provided basic information necessary for effective management. These surveys, which included an atlas, were impressive, even today.

The Interior Department's Land Office section tried for a brief period to develop its capability to manage the reserves. Filibert Roth became the head of the United States General Land Office's "Division R"-the Forestry Division on November 15, 1901, and resigned two years later, in 1903.

Gifford Pinchot, of the United States Department of Agriculture's Division of Forestry at this time, advocated for the removal of the reserves from Interior and placed under the Agriculture Department so that the forest reserves and the foresters would all be under one department. He also had a poor opinion of the Land Office due to "land office routine, political stupidity and wrong-headed points of view. " A campaign was mounted toward this goal by Pinchot as well as the American Forestry Association and the Sierra Club. Finally, the effort paid off in Feb. 1905 when President Roosevelt signed into law the Forest Transfer Act.

== Izaak Walton League and Zieske lawsuits Result in Congress Repealing the Organic Act ==
The Izaak Walton League, a conservation group formed in 1922, that sought the complete abolishment of livestock grazing on national forest lands in the 1930s. The League's Los Angeles chapter petitioned Region 5 of the Forest Service to immediately and absolutely abolish all grazing permits of both sheep and cattle from California's national forest lands. The League's position was that sheep grazing was a costly mistake and a man-made hazard to forests and watersheds, that cattle grazing had been too heavy and that both types of livestock hindered wildlife.

In May 1973, the League successfully sued the Department of Agriculture over the clear-cut logging practices in the Monongahela National Forest as being contrary to the Organic Act of 1897 which stated that only "dead, physically mature and large growth trees "individually marked for cutting" could be sold. The appeals court upheld the lower court's decision in August 1975.

On December 23, 1975, Alaska Federal District Court Judge Van Der Heydt held that four plaintiffs in Alaska's Tongass National Forest should prevail on their Organic Act claims agreeing with the Fourth Circuit's decision in West Virginia Division of the Isaak Walton League of America, Inc. v. Butz, 522 F.2d 945. The Alaska case was called Zieske v. Butz, 406 F. Supp. 258 (D. Alaska 1975). Its plaintiffs were Herbert Zieske, Charles Zieske, Alan Stein, The Point Baker Association, and the Tongass Conservation Association. Zieske bared the Ketchikan Company from clearcutting about 400,000 acres on the north end of Prince of Wales Island. In contrast, the West Virginia case applied to under 1000 acres. One of the purposes of the suit was to protect fish streams from clearcutting to their banks by establishing mandatory buffer strips.

As a result of the pressure these two lawsuits generated, Congress repealed the Organic Act when it passed the National Forest Management Act of 1976 signed by President Gerald Ford. No buffer strip provisions were included in the new law which replaced the basis of Forest Service Management.

== See also ==
- Bernhard Fernow
