= Weeks Act =

United States federal law

- Long title: An Act To enable any State to cooperate with any other State or States, or with the United States, for the protection of the watersheds of navigable streams, and to appoint a commission for the acquisition of lands for the purpose of conserving the navigability of navigable rivers.
- Enacted by: the 61st United States Congress

Citations
- Public law: Pub. L. 61–435
- Statutes at Large: 36 Stat. 961

Legislative history
- Introduced in the House as H.R. 11798 by John W. Weeks on July 23, 1909; Passed the House on June 24, 1910; Passed the Senate on February 15, 1911; Signed into law by President William Howard Taft on March 1, 1911

United States Supreme Court cases
- United States Forest Service v. Cowpasture River Preservation Association

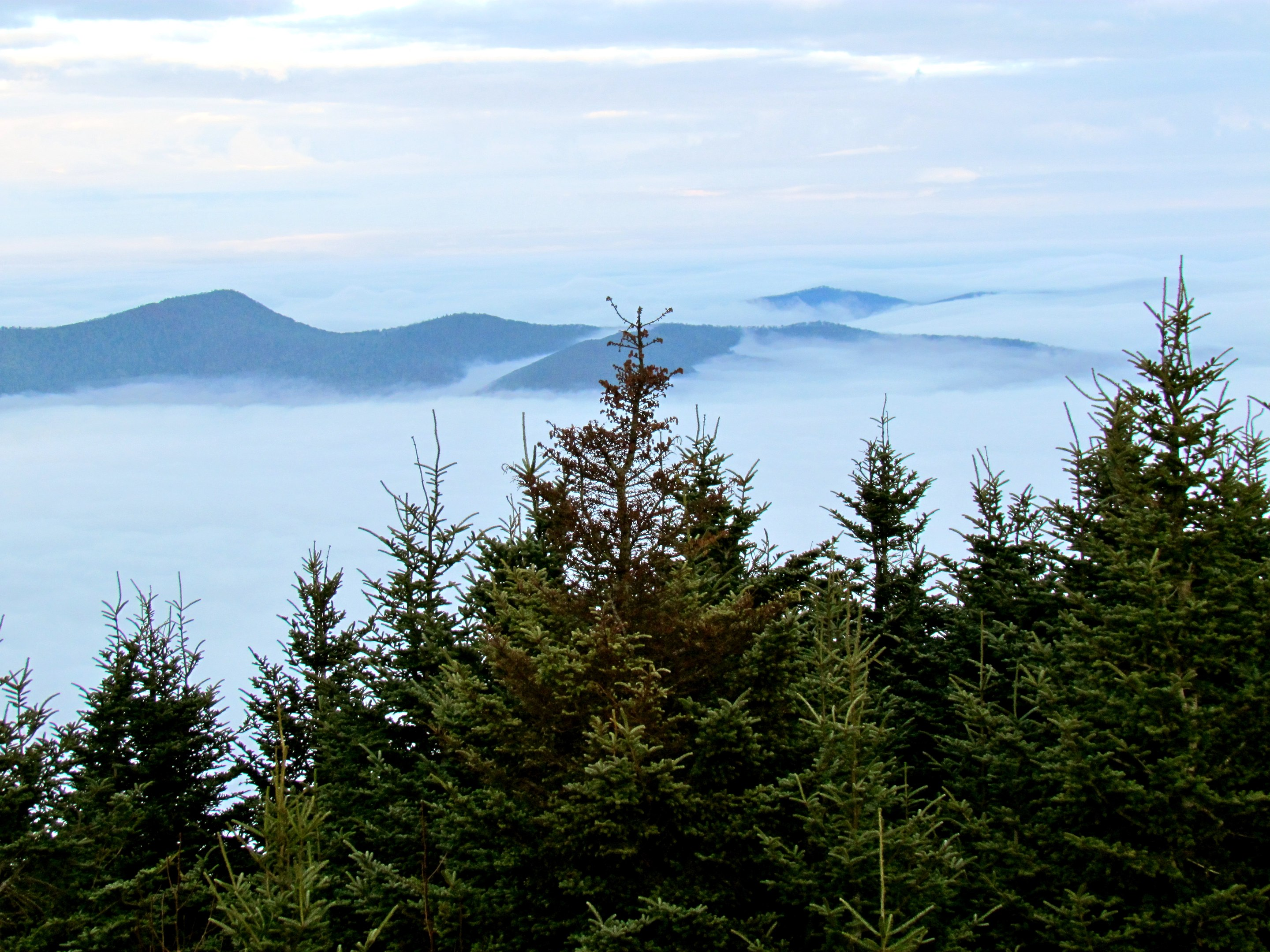
Pisgah National Forest in North Carolina, established 1916

The Weeks Act is a federal law (36 Stat. 961) enacted by the United States Congress on March 1, 1911. Introduced by Massachusetts Congressman John W. Weeks and signed into law by President William Howard Taft, the law authorized the United States Secretary of Agriculture to "Examine, locate and recommend for purchase ... such lands within the watersheds of navigable streams as ... may be necessary to the regulation of flow of navigable streams...." This meant that the federal government would be able to purchase private land if the purchase was deemed necessary to protect rivers' and watersheds' headwaters in the eastern United States. Furthermore, the law allowed for land acquired through this act to be preserved and maintained as national forest territory. Six years earlier, the Transfer Act of 1905 transferred control over the federal forest reserves from the United States General Land Office of the Department of the Interior to the Department of Agriculture and its Forest Service. Responsibility for land purchased through the Weeks Act was not given to former Chief Forester Gifford Pinchot because he resigned from the National Forest Reservation Commission in 1907, with the stipulation that he would only resign if he could appoint his successor. This stipulation led to the Forest Service's tradition of picking a head with forestry knowledge. With the land acquired through the Weeks Act, Pinchot's successor obtained the power to issue permits for water power development on National Forests. The Weeks Act appropriated $9 million to purchase 6 million acres (24,000 km^{2}) of land in the eastern United States.

The Weeks Act also provided measures for more cooperation between federal and state governments in regard to fire control. This legislation was heavily influenced by the fire season of 1910 because it wreaked havoc across the western United States, particularly in Idaho, where 85 people, including 72 firefighters, were killed in fires and more than 3 million acres (12,000 km^{2}) of land and roughly 8 billion board feet (19,000,000 m^{3}) of timber were destroyed by the Great Fire of 1910. This year's fire season alone put the US Forest Service $1.1 million in debt.

The Weeks Act also authorized establishment of the National Forest Reservation Commission to consider and approve purchase of these identified lands. The commission was composed of the secretaries of the Interior, Agriculture, and War (for the Corps of Engineers), as well as two members each from the House and Senate. Jacob Gallinger, who had sponsored the Senate's version of the bill, was named a member of the initial committee. The commission would exist from 1911 to 1966.

The drafting of Weeks Act was originally motivated by the intent to purchase lands in eastern United States, where the federal government owned no large tracts of land devoted to conservation. Later western lands were acquired under the Weeks Act. The Weeks Act was substantially expanded and modified by the Clarke–McNary Act in 1924.

Major national forests that were formed under the Weeks Act are the Allegheny National Forest, White Mountain National Forest, Green Mountain National Forest, Pisgah National Forest, George Washington National Forest, and Ottawa National Forest. To date, the Weeks Act has protected more than 20 million acres of forestland, which has had a tremendous benefit for ecosystems and society by providing habitat for plants and animals, creating lucrative recreation spots for tourists, and creating economic opportunities for local communities, stimulating the economy.

The Weeks Act effectively outlawed some Native American fire management practices.

The Weeks Act was involved in the United States Forest Service v. Cowpasture River Preservation Assn. decision.

== See also ==
- Clarke–McNary Act, an expansion in 1924
- Environmental history of the United States
