= Jermyn, Pennsylvania =

Borough in Pennsylvania, US

- Borough
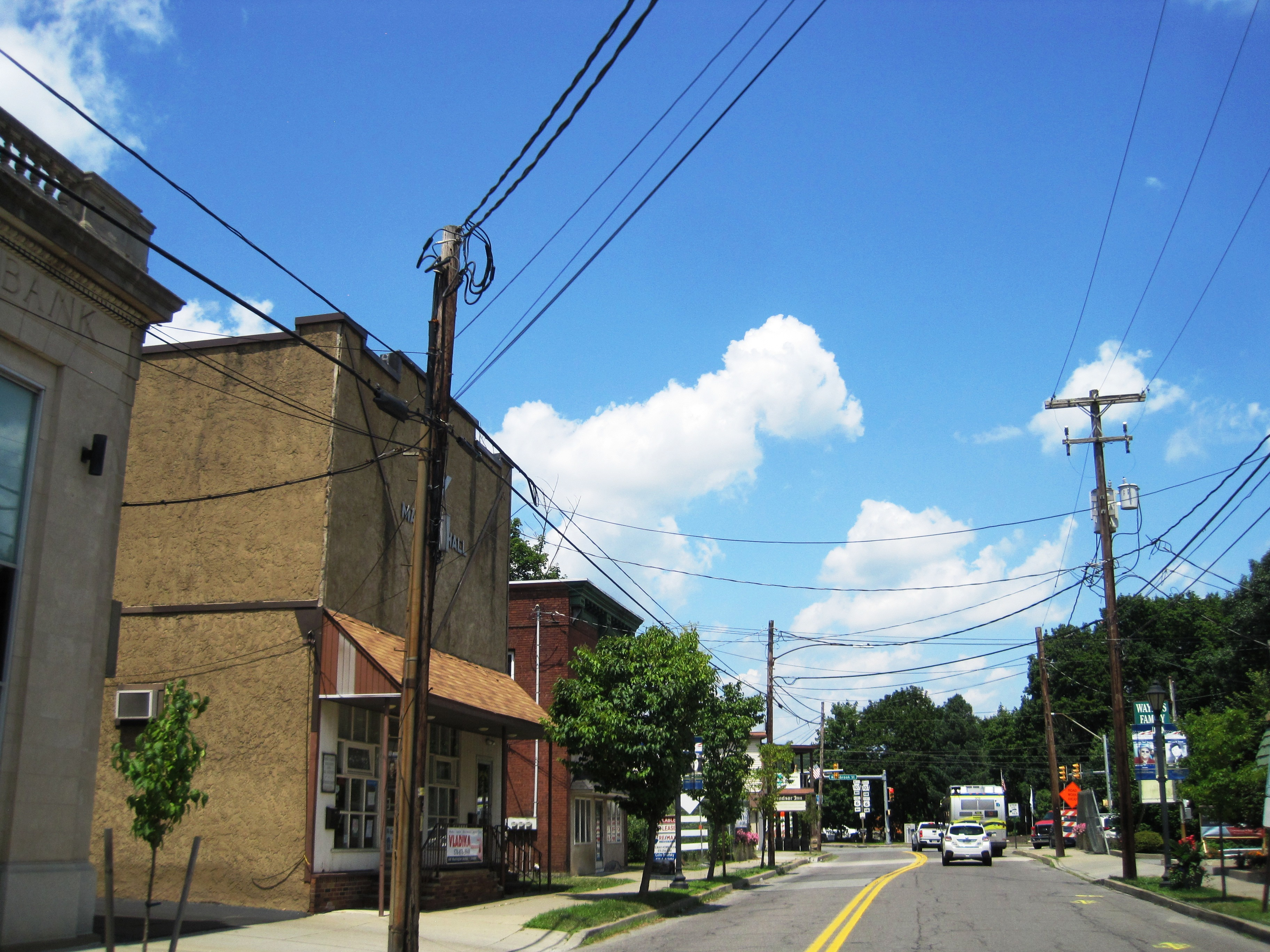
- Washington Avenue in Jermyn

- Flag

- Location of Jermyn in Lackawanna County, Pennsylvania

- Location in Pennsylvania Location in the United States
- Coordinates: 41°31′40″N 75°32′50″W
- Country: United States
- State: Pennsylvania
- County: Lackawanna

Government
  - Mayor: Anthony Fuga Jr

Area
  - Total: 0.79 sq mi (2.05 km^{2})
  - Land: 0.79 sq mi (2.05 km^{2})
  - Water: 0 sq mi (0.00 km^{2})
- Elevation: 977 ft (298 m)

Population (2020)
  - Total: 2,150
  - Density: 2,713.4/sq mi (1,047.64/km^{2})
- Time zone: UTC-5 (EST)
  - Summer (DST): UTC-4 (EDT)
- ZIP code: 18433
- Area code: 570
- FIPS code: 42-38096
- Website: jermynpa.com

Jermyn, known as "The Birthplace of First Aid in America", is a borough which is located in Lackawanna County, Pennsylvania, United States. Located on the Lackawanna River, it is 12 miles (19 km) northeast of Scranton.

In 1900, the population was 2,567, much of it attracted by the prospects of finding work at a large anthracite coal site in the region. Coal mines, cut glass works, silk, powder, grist, planing, sawmills, bottling works, and fertilizer factories dotted the borough during the early years of the twentieth century.

By the time of the 2020 census, the population had declined to 2,156.

Jermyn is presently the mailing address of the Lakeland School District. East Jermyn, the section of town east of the Lackawanna River and west of the small section of Archbald known as "Nebraska", is commonly referred to as "The Lane".

== History ==
Historic aerial view of Jermyn

The borough originally named Gibsonburg, was named for John Jermyn, a businessperson in the mining industry.

Jermyn is known as "The Birthplace of First Aid in America." In 1899, Dr. Matthew J. Shields conducted the nation's first training class on First Aid at the Windsor Hotel. He instructed 25 miners from the Jermyn Coal Colliery how to provide quick, effective medical care until a physician could reach the mine. After completion of the course, each of the miners was able to provide first aid to injured comrades—leading to dramatic reductions in serious mining injuries and fatalities. Unfortunately for numerous coal miners, a "silent killer" called black lung disease was caused by inhaling coal dust over time and this resulted in the untimely deaths of many former miners.

Jermyn was incorporated as a borough in 1870 and celebrated its centennial in 1970 throughout the year, with a week-long celebration in July. A carnival and fireworks display were held in East Jermyn at the St Michael's Russian Orthodox Hall grounds.

== Geography ==
Jermyn is located at 41°31′40″N 75°32′50″W (41.527806, -75.547147). According to the U.S. Census Bureau, the borough has a total area of 0.8 square miles (2.1 km^{2}), all of it land. Elevation at Jermyn Community Center is 977 feet above sea level.

== Demographics ==
Historical population
Census	Pop.	Note	%±
1880	1,541		—
1890	2,650		72.0%
1900	2,567		−3.1%
1910	3,158		23.0%
1920	3,326		5.3%
1930	3,519		5.8%
1940	3,238		−8.0%
1950	2,535		−21.7%
1960	2,568		1.3%
1970	2,435		−5.2%
1980	2,411		−1.0%
1990	2,263		−6.1%
2000	2,287		1.1%
2010	2,169		−5.2%
2020	2,150		−0.9%
2021 (est.)	2,148	▼	−0.1%

As of the census of 2010, there were 2,169 people, 951 households, and 581 families residing in the borough.

The population density was 2,711.3 inhabitants per square mile (1,046.8/km^{2}). There were 1,017 housing units at an average density of 1,271.3 units per square mile (490.9 units/km^{2}).

The racial makeup of the borough was 96.8% White, 1.1% African American, 0.3% Native American, 0.4% Asian, 0.6% from other races, and 0.8% from two or more races. Hispanic or Latino of any race were 2.1% of the population.

There were 951 households, out of which 24.1% had children under the age of eighteen living with them; 43% were married couples living together, 13.6% had a female householder with no husband present, and 38.9% were non-families. 32.3% of all households were made up of individuals, and 11.6% had someone living alone who was sixty-five years of age or older. The average household size was 2.27 and the average family size was 2.87.

In the borough the population was spread out, with 20.4% under the age of eighteen, 61.7% from eighteen to sixty-four, and 17.9% who were sixty-five years of age or older. The median age was forty-two years.

The median income for a household in the borough was $32,824, and the median income for a family was $39,740. Males had a median income of $29,063 compared with that of $23,580 for females.

The per capita income for the borough was $17,417.

Roughly 8.9% of families and 12.7% of the population were living below the poverty line, including 19.3% of those who were under the age of eighteen and 13.4% of those who were aged sixty-five or older.
