= Carbondale Area School District =

School district in Pennsylvania

Coordinates: 41.60902°N 75.50354°W

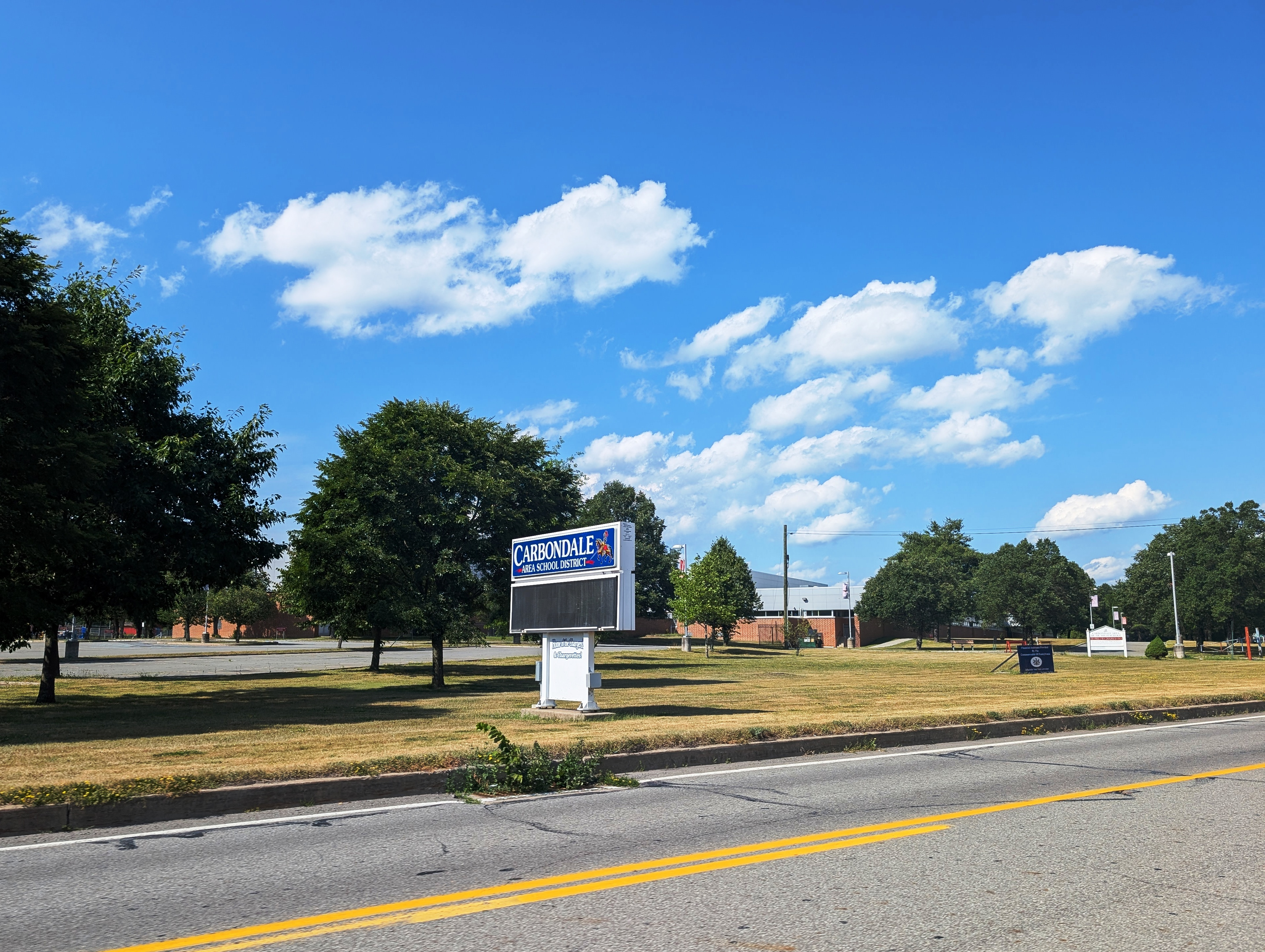
- Sign for the district in front of Carbondale Area Junior Senior High School

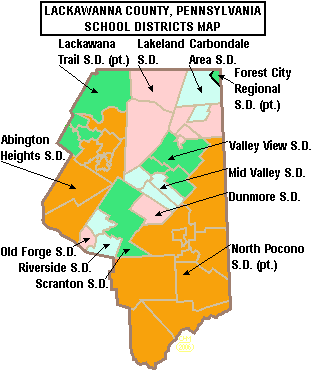

Address
- Business Route 6/101 Brooklyn Street Carbondale, Lackawanna County, Pennsylvania, 18407-2207; United States

District information
- Type: Public

Students and staff
- District mascot: Chargers

Other information
- Website: carbondalearea.org

The Carbondale Area School District is a small, suburban school district that provides education services to the children residing in the City of Carbondale and Fell Township in Lackawanna County, Pennsylvania. The district encompasses an area of 18.6 square miles (48 km^{2}). The school district had a population of 11,641, according to the 2000 federal census. By 2010, the district's population declined to 11,065 people. The educational attainment levels for the Carbondale Area School District population (25 years old and over) were 87.4% high school graduates and 16.4% college graduates. The district is one of the 500 public school districts of Pennsylvania an done of 12 districts operating in Lackawanna County.

According to the Pennsylvania Budget and Policy Center, 64.7% of the district's pupils lived at 185% or below the Federal Poverty level as shown by their eligibility for the federal free or reduced price school meal programs in 2012. In 2009, the District residents' per capita income was $15,174, while the median family income was $35,833. In the United States the median family income was $49,445, in 2010. In Lackawanna County, the median household income was $43,673. By 2013, the median household income in the United States rose to $52,100.

According to district officials, the Carbondale Area School District provided basic educational services to 1,615 pupils in 2011-12. The district employed: 121 teachers, 94 full-time and part-time support personnel, and 6 administrators during the 2011-12 school year. The Carbondale Area School District received $11 million in state funding in the 2011-12 school year. Per Carbondale Area School District administrative officials, during the 2005-06 school year, the district provided basic educational services to 1,458 pupils. The district students are 95% white, 1% Asian, 2% black and 3% Hispanic. In 2006, the district employed 6 administrators, 103 teachers, and 46 full-time and part-time support personnel.

Special education is provided by district employees and the Northeastern Educational Intermediate Unit IU19. Occupational training and adult education in various vocational and technical fields were provided by the district and the Career Technology Center of Lackawanna County.

The Carbondale Area School District operates two schools: Carbondale Area Junior Senior High School (7th-12th) and Carbondale Area Elementary School (Preschool-6th).

== Extracurriculars ==
Carbondale Area School District offers a variety of clubs, activities and an extensive sports program.

=== Sports ===
The district funds:

Boys

- Baseball - AA
- Basketball- AA
- Cross Country - A
- Football - AA
- Golf - AA
- Soccer - A
- Track and Field - AA

Girls

- Basketball - AA
- Cross Country - A
- Golf - AA
- Soccer (Fall) - A
- Track and Field - AA

Junior High School Sports

Boys

- Baseball
- Basketball
- Cross Country
- Soccer
- Track and Field

Girls

- Basketball
- Cross Country
- Soccer (Fall)
- Softball
- Track and Field

According to PIAA directory July 2013
