= Envirothon =

North American Envirothon
- Logo
- Purpose: Environmental competition
- Headquarters: Washington, D.C.
- Website: envirothon.org
- Formerly called: Environmental Olympics, Enviro-Olympics

NCF-Envirothon is an annual environmentally themed academic competition for high school aged students organized by the NCF-Envirothon a program of the National Conservation Foundation. The competition is held by the United States and Canada on a regional, state, and bi-national level. In select years, the competition has also included China and Singapore. Envirothon combines in-class and hands-on environmental education in a competition setting which involves a problem-solving presentation as well as written field tests. The competition tests students on five core subjects — aquatic ecology, forestry, soils and land use, and wildlife — along with a fifth annually-changing subtopic which focuses on relevant environmental issues. Currently, roughly 25,000 students from forty-five U.S. states and nine Canadian provinces/territories participate in the competition.

States and provinces across the United States and Canada each have their own local competitions from which the winning high school team earns the privilege of representing their state/province at the NCF-Envirothon competition, held each summer in a different U.S. state or Canadian province. In areas with a considerable number of teams, subdivisions such as county, regional, or district competitions are also held. Teams must win these intermediary competitions in order to move on to the state/province levels.

== Organizers and Sponsors ==
The NCF-Envirothon is a 501(c)3 Nonprofit organization headquartered in Washington, D.C. The organization also relies heavily on volunteers across North America to advise individual teams from each participating state and province. Governing the program is the National Conservation Foundation (NCF) Executive, along with a NCF-Envirothon Operating Committee which is made up of representatives from participating states and provinces.

Envirothon is sponsored by the National Conservation Foundation, the National Association of Conservation Districts, the United States Forest Service, and the Natural Resources Conservation Service. Individual teams are often sponsored by school clubs or classes, local businesses and governments, or 4H and other such non-scholastic organizations.

== Competition ==
Competition participants are generally teams of five students with one to two team advisers. Home-schoolers can also take part as their own team.

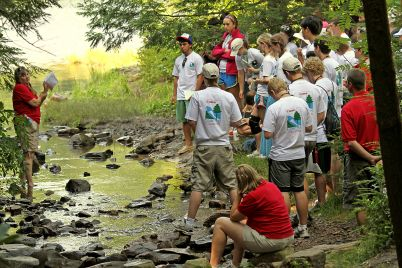
Training Session During the 2012 Envirothon Competition.

States and provinces across the United States and Canada each have their own local competitions from which the winning high school team earns the privilege of representing their state/province at the North American Envirothon Competition, held each summer in a different U.S. state or Canadian province. In regions with a considerable number of teams, competitions on subdivision, county, regional, or district levels are also held. Teams must win these intermediary competitions in order to move on to the state/province levels. At the North American Competition, teams that rank first through tenth receive prizes and scholarships of various values.

Competition week at the NCF-Envirothon level includes various workshops, field trips, and seminars led by professionals and educators for both the students and their advisors. Most of these outings are linked to the current issue topic and provide information on the area in which the competition is being held.

During the competition, each team must complete five written field tests, each dealing with a different topic. These tests consist of various question types, including identifications and hands-on assessments. Each team must also prepare an oral presentation on the current issue topic, which the team presents to a panel of judges. An important element of the competition is the understanding that each topic is interrelated, and understanding human effects on the environment and how human activities connect with ecosystem functions. Each test is scored out of 100 points, with the presentation being scored out of 200 points. The team with the highest cumulative total of points at the end of the scoring is the winning team. Recognition is also given to teams with the highest scoring in each of the five categories.

=== Competition locations ===
The location of the North American competition is determined based on a regional map that separates North America into five general regions: Far West, Mid-West, Southeast, Northeast, and Far North. The host college or university is usually located in a different region than that of the year preceding it. For example, a competition (2013) was held in at Montana State University in Bozeman, Montana in the Far West.

== Competition Topics ==
Each field test dealing with one of five competition topics requires both theoretical understandings and hand-on skills such as identification and chemical testing. Each topic also has a degree of relatedness to one another, which is sometimes considered in theoretical-based test questions.

=== Aquatic Ecology ===
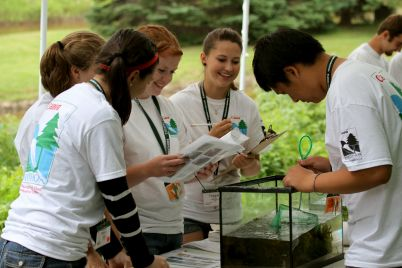
Aquatic Ecology Testing at the 2011 Envirothon Competition.

- Learning objectives includes the hydrosphere, aquatic ecosystem, aquatic organisms, water protection and conservation, and the connection of water to society, and more.
- The field test deals with these learning objectives, with focuses on the functions and significance of watersheds and wetlands; the identification of aquatic organisms and their connections between water quality; and water use, regulation, and threats such as invasive species.
- Hands-on tasks conducted during the field test include identification of wetland types and species, outlining a watershed on a topographic map, and performing chemical water quality tests.

=== Forestry ===
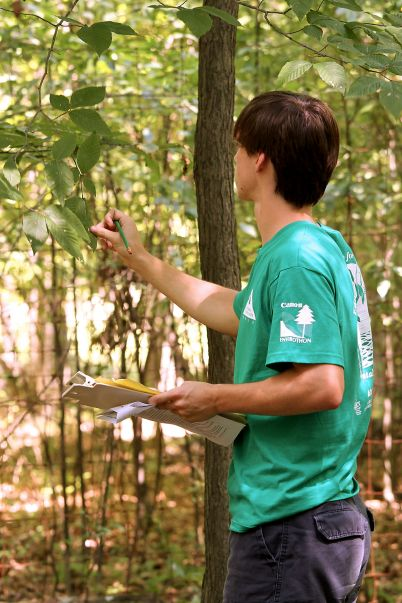
Forestry Testing during the Envirothon Competition.

- Learning objectives include tree and shrub physiology, forest ecology, sustainable forest management, and trees as important renewable resources, and more.
- The field test also focuses on forest structure in relation to biotic and abiotic factors; silviculture techniques and tool use; and the identification and management of invasive species and diseases.
- The test's hands-on portion includes various tasks such as identifying trees, using common forestry tools, collecting tree core samples using an increment borer to determine tree age and historical influences, and tree planting using proper techniques.

=== Soils and Land Use ===
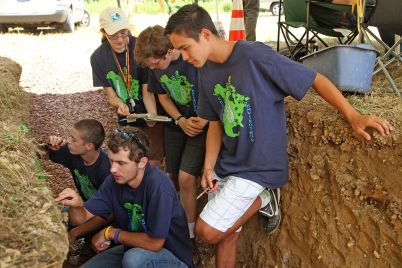
Students Examine a Soil Profile during the Envirothon Soils and Land Use Test.

- Learning objectives include physical properties of soil and soil formation, soil ecosystems, chemical properties of soil, soil conservation and land use management, and soil surveying, among others.
- Within these objectives lie focuses on identifying and understanding soil profiles and horizons; chemical properties and balances of soil; and understanding soil data, surveys, and drainage and their relations to soil use.
- The field test includes hands-on tasks such as soil texture, type, color, identification, outlining the different horizons in a soil profile, and performing chemical soil property tests.

=== Wildlife ===
- Learning objectives for the Wildlife field test include knowledge of wild birds and mammals, wildlife ecology, conservation and management of wildlife, and issues involving wildlife and society, among other objectives.
- Other topic focuses include understanding food habits and skull morphology of wildlife species; habitat features and influences; wildlife adaptations; and predator/prey relationships and carrying capacity of ecosystems; and how humans, introduced species, and diseases affect wildlife.
- Hands-on tasks conducted during this test include using an identification key to identify wildlife pelts, skulls, footprints, and calls/sounds; and using Global Positioning System to track tagged specimens.

=== Current Issue ===
- The fifth topic changes annually, and deals with issues affecting present-day society and environment.
- The Current Issue field test focuses on theoretical understandings of the issue in relation to the other four competition topics, as well as some hands-on activities. Current Issue Topics have included, Urban Forestry (2015), Sustainable Agriculture and Locally Grown (2014), Sustainable Rangeland Management (2013), Nonpoint source pollution/Low Impact Development (2012), Salt and Freshwater Estuaries (2011), Protection of Groundwater Through Urban, Agricultural, and Environmental planning (2010) and Biodiversity in a Changing World (2009), among others in earlier years.

== History ==
In 1979 the Pennsylvania Soil and Water Conservation Districts set up the Environmental Olympics, later renamed Enviro-Olympics, to encourage interest in environmental issues through hands-on competition. Expanding rapidly to include forty conservation districts by 1987, it gained attention from other states, and in 1988, the program became the National Envirothon, with participation from Pennsylvania, Massachusetts, and Ohio. In 1992 Nova Scotia became the first Canadian province to join the competition. The competition was sponsored by various state, local, and provincial conservation programs and associations until 1997 when Canon Inc. began its support of the program, with local sponsors still supporting lower level competitions. In 1999 Canon became the title sponsor of the competition between the U.S. states and Canadian provinces, with the competition being renamed the "Canon Envirothon." It is currently referred to as the "NCF-Envirothon."

=== Results ===
Hosts and top-five competition place winners from past North American Envirothon competitions:

Year	Host	1st place	2nd place	3rd place	4th place	5th place
2001	Hinds Community College, Raymond, Mississippi	Pennsylvania	Mississippi	North Carolina	New Jersey	New Hampshire
2002	Hampshire College, Amherst, Massachusetts	New Hampshire	North Carolina	Pennsylvania	Vermont	Ohio
2003	Mount St. Mary's University, Emmitsburg, Maryland	Pennsylvania	New Hampshire	North Carolina	Manitoba	Maryland
2004	West Virginia Wesleyan College, Buckhannon, West Virginia	Florida	Virginia	New Jersey	Kentucky	North Carolina
2005	Southwest Missouri State University, Springfield, Missouri	Pennsylvania	Virginia	Delaware	Kentucky	North Carolina
2006	University of Manitoba, Winnipeg, Manitoba	Virginia	Pennsylvania	Texas	California	Ohio
2007	Hobart and William Smith Colleges, Geneva, New York	Connecticut	Pennsylvania	Delaware	Missouri	New Jersey
2008	Northern Arizona University, Flagstaff, Arizona	Delaware	Missouri	Pennsylvania	New York	Ohio
2009	University of North Carolina, Asheville, North Carolina	Pennsylvania	North Carolina	Maryland	Delaware	Missouri
2010	California State University, Fresno, California	California	Delaware	Minnesota	Florida	Maryland
2011	Mount Allison University, Sackville, New Brunswick	Manitoba	Ontario	South Carolina	New Brunswick	Connecticut
2012	Susquehanna University, Selinsgrove, Pennsylvania	Missouri	Ontario	North Carolina	Ohio	New York
2013	Montana State University, Bozeman, Montana	New York	Massachusetts	Missouri	New Hampshire	Mississippi
2015	Missouri State University, Springfield, Missouri	Missouri	Pennsylvania	Texas	Massachusetts	New York
2016	Trent University, Peterborough, Ontario	Ontario	Pennsylvania	California	Missouri	Maryland
2017	Mount Saint Mary's University, Emmitsburg, Maryland	Pennsylvania	New York	New Mexico	Missouri	Ohio
2018	Idaho State University, Pocatello, Idaho	New York	Montana	Virginia	New Mexico	South Carolina
2019	North Carolina State University, Raleigh, North Carolina	Virginia	North Carolina	Pennsylvania	New York	Mississippi
2021	Nebraska Association of Resources Districts	New York	North Carolina	South Carolina	Massachusetts	Florida
2022	Miami University, Oxford, Ohio	Massachusetts	Maryland	Florida	New York	North Carolina
2023	Mount Allison University, Sackville, New Brunswick	Massachusetts	Pennsylvania	Ontario	Florida	New Mexico
2024	Hobart and William Smith Colleges, Geneva, New York	Tennessee	New York	Maryland	North Carolina	Illinois
2025	Mount Royal University, Calgary, Alberta	Massachusetts	Maryland	New York	North Carolina	New Mexico
2026	Mississippi State University, Starkville, Mississippi	New York	North Carolina	North Dakota	Pennsylvania	Massachusetts
