= Greenfield Township, Lackawanna County, Pennsylvania =

Township in Pennsylvania, US

Greenfield Township
- Township
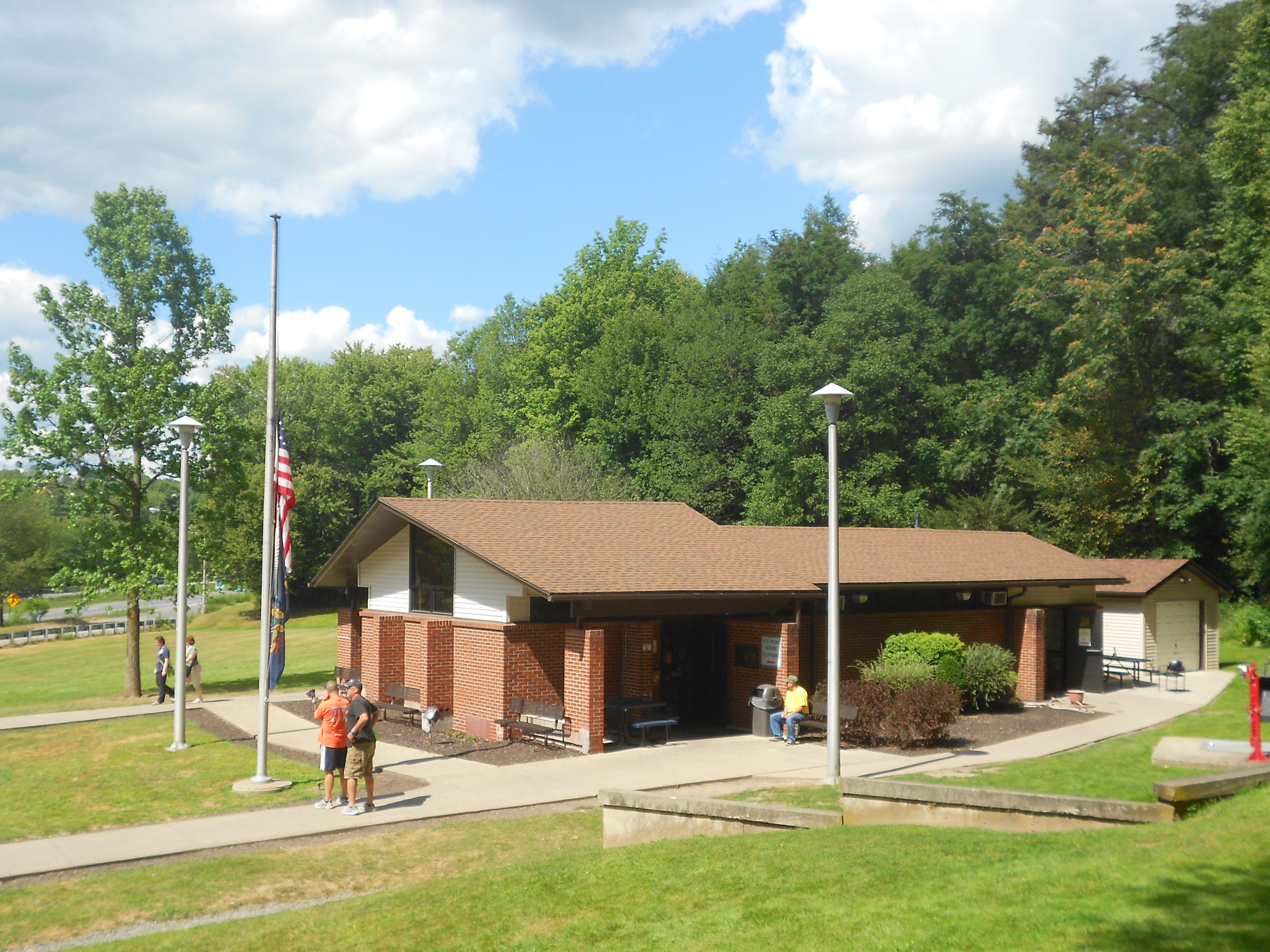
- Rest stop 55 at mile 202.5 of Interstate 81

- Location of Pennsylvania in the United States
- Coordinates: 41°38′N 75°38′W
- Country: United States
- State: Pennsylvania
- County: Lackawanna
- Founded: January 1816

Area
  - Total: 21.54 sq mi (55.79 km^{2})
  - Land: 20.93 sq mi (54.22 km^{2})
  - Water: 0.61 sq mi (1.57 km^{2})
- Elevation: 1,348 ft (411 m)

Population (2020)
  - Total: 2,268 ▲
  - Estimate (2021): 2,268
  - Density: 96/sq mi (37.2/km^{2})
- Time zone: UTC-5 (EST)
  - Summer (DST): UTC-4 (EDT)
- ZIP Code: 18407, 18433
- Area code: 570
- FIPS code: 42-069-31016
- Website: https://greenfieldtownshipsupervisors.org/

Greenfield Township is a township in Lackawanna County, Pennsylvania, United States. The population was 2,268 at the 2020 census. It is one of the five municipalities which comprises the Lakeland School District. Township government consists of a board of Supervisors. Meetings are held at the township Municipal Hall, which is located at 424 Route 106, just south of Our Mother of Sorrows cemetery on Finch Hill corners.

Greenfield Township was formed in January 1816 from a northern portion of Abington Township, when both were then located in Luzerne County.

== Geography ==
According to the United States Census Bureau, the township has a total area of 21.5 square miles (56 km^{2}), of which 20.9 square miles (54 km^{2}) is land and 0.6 square miles (1.6 km^{2}) (2.89%) is water.

== Demographics ==
Historical population
Census	Pop.	Note	%±
2010	2,105		—
2020	2,268		7.7%
2021 (est.)	2,268		0.0%
U.S. Decennial Census

=== 2000 census ===
At the 2000 census there were 1,990 people, 767 households, and 589 families in the township. The population density was 95.6 inhabitants per square mile (36.9/km^{2}). There were 983 housing units at an average density of 47.2 units per square mile (18.2 units/km^{2}). The racial makeup of the township was 98.69% White, 0.55% African American, 0.15% Native American, 0.30% Asian, and 0.30% from two or more races. Hispanic or Latino of any race were 0.35%.

There were 767 households, 32.5% had children under the age of 18 living with them, 63.1% were married couples living together, 7.8% had a female householder with no husband present, and 23.2% were non-families. 20.6% of households were made up of individuals, and 9.5% were one person aged 65 or older. The average household size was 2.59 and the average family size was 3.01.

The age distribution was 23.4% under the age of 18, 7.2% from 18 to 24, 30.1% from 25 to 44, 24.2% from 45 to 64, and 15.1% 65 or older. The median age was 39 years. For every 100 females there were 95.9 males. For every 100 females age 18 and over, there were 100.5 males.

The median household income was $39,865 and the median family income was $46,477. Males had a median income of $31,506 versus $23,571 for females. The per capita income for the township was $18,517. About 3.7% of families and 6.0% of the population were below the poverty line, including 7.6% of those under age 18 and 5.0% of those age 65 or over.

=== 2010 census ===
At the 2010 census there were 2,105 people, 828 households, and 608 families in the township. The population density was 100.7 inhabitants per square mile (38.9/km^{2}). There were 1,001 housing units at an average density of 47.9 units per square mile (18.5 units/km^{2}). The racial makeup of the township was 98.5% White, 0.5% African American, 0.1% Native American, 0.2% Asian, 0.1% other race, and 0.6% from two or more races. Hispanic or Latino of any race were 0.7%.

There were 828 households, 28.5% had children under the age of 18 living with them, 60.5% were married couples living together, 8.1% had a female householder with no husband present, and 26.6% were non-families. 22.2% of households were made up of individuals, and 9.9% were one person aged 65 or older. The average household size was 2.54 and the average family size was 2.96.

The age distribution was 22% under the age of 18, 61.5% from 18 to 64, and 16.5% 65 or older. The median age was 43.8 years.

== Public safety ==
Greenfield Township maintains a police department with offices in the township municipal building. Greenfield Township Volunteer Fire Company provides fire and emergency medical services in cooperation with other local departments and agencies. As a volunteer department, they train cadets and adults to provide service to the community.

== Community ==
Greenfield Day is a yearly event held at the township municipal building. Greenfield Day is held in August each year.

Greenfield Township has an active historical society with a collection of local memorabilia. Ground was broken on August 12, 2007, for the Greenfield Township Historical Museum.

The Greenfield Township Baseball Association is the local affiliate of the Lakeland Little League Association. They play at the Eric Slebodnik Memorial Sports Complex on Hickory Ridge Road. The location was cleared in the 1970s by the Greenfield Lions Club. Hurricane Hills Sports Center is an AMA sanctioned motocross racing center located in Greenfield Township.

=== Local Ordinances ===
According to the Greenfield Township website, Greenfield Township was the first rural community in the United States to provide street addressing for residents to help with quicker response in event of an emergency. By ordinance, residents have been required to display their house numbers beginning January 1, 1999.

Greenfield Township is a zoned community.
