= Water Bank Program =

The Water Bank Program (WBP) is a United States program to set aside wetlands for a period of 10 years (renewable) for conservation purposes. Participants receive annual rental payments. As these contracts expire, participants are offered the opportunity to place the land in the Wetland Reserve Program (WRP). Land is no longer being enrolled in Water Bank.
