= Carbondale Area Junior Senior High School =

Public school in Carbondale, Pennsylvania, United States

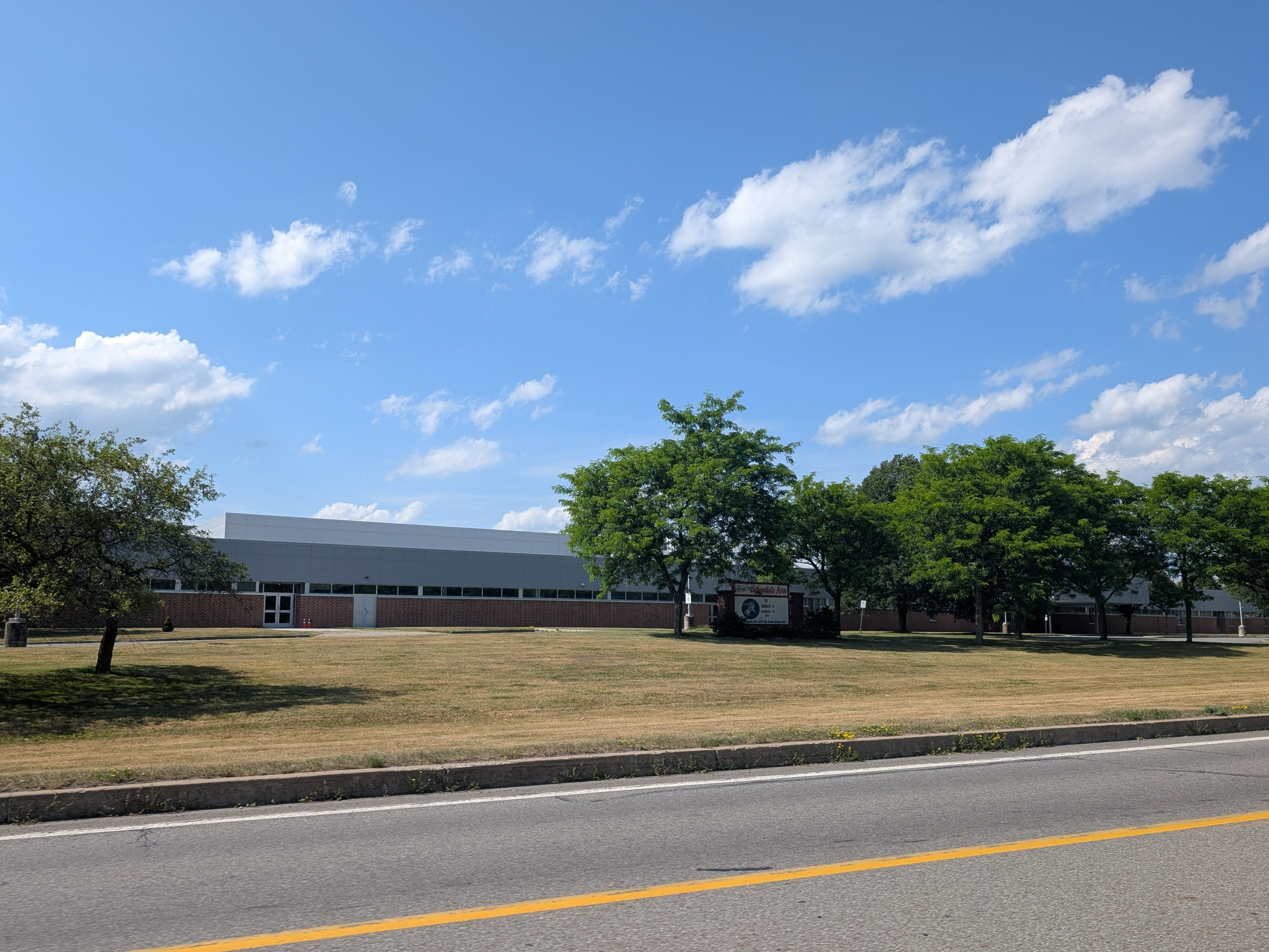

Location
- 101 Brooklyn Street; Carbondale, Lackawanna County, Pennsylvania 18407-2207; United States
- 41.5680°N 75.5124°W

Information
- Type: Public
- Teaching staff: 71.70 (FTE)
- Grades: 7–12
- Enrollment: 736 (2024-2025)
- Student to teacher ratio: 10.26
- Language: English
- Colors: Blue and Red
- Team name: Chargers
- Feeder schools: Carbondale Area Elementary School
- Website: https://carbondalearea.org/carbondale-area-jrsr-high-school/

Carbondale Area junior Senior High School is located at 101 Brooklyn Street, Carbondale, in the US state of Pennsylvania. The school is the only high school operated by the Carbondale Area School District. In 2014, Carbondale Area junior Senior High School enrollment was reported as 713 pupils in 7th through 12th grades. Carbondale Area Junior Senior High School employed 52 teachers in 2013.

High school students may choose to attend the Career and Technology Center of Lackawanna County for training in the construction and mechanical trades. The Northeastern Educational Intermediate Unit IU19 provides the school with a wide variety of services like specialized education for disabled students and hearing, speech and visual disability services and professional development for staff and faculty.

== Extracurriculars ==
Carbondale Area School District offers a variety of clubs, activities and sports.

=== Sports ===
The district funds:

Boys

- Baseball - AA
- Basketball- AA
- Cross country - A
- Football - AA
- Golf - AA
- Soccer - A
- Track and field - AA

Girls

- Basketball - AA
- Cross country - AA
- Golf - AA
- Soccer (Fall) - A
- Softball - AA
- Track and field - AA

Junior high sports

Boys

- Baseball
- Basketball
- Cross country
- Football
- Soccer
- Track and field

Girls

- Basketball
- Cross country
- Soccer (Fall)
- Softball
- Track and field

According to PIAA directory July 2014
