= Mayfield, Pennsylvania =

Borough in Pennsylvania, US

- Borough
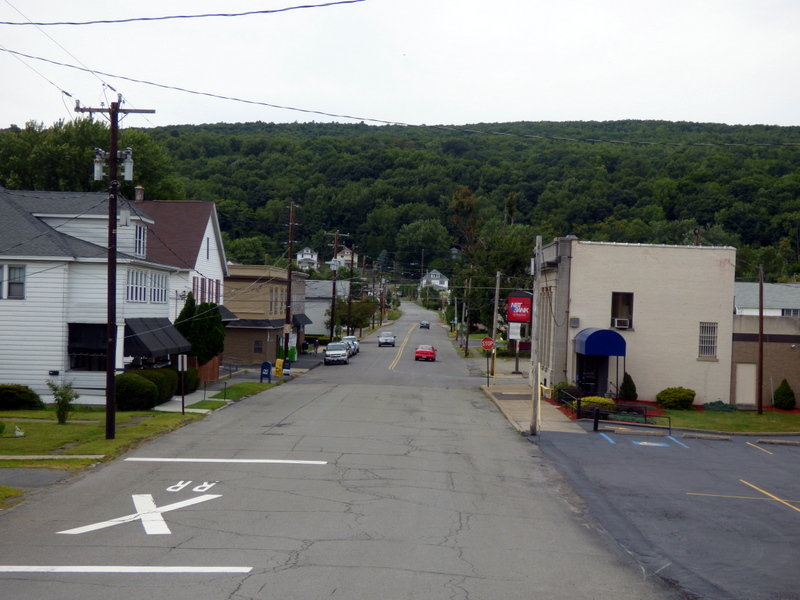

- Flag

- Location of Mayfield in Lackawanna County, Pennsylvania.

- Location in Pennsylvania Location in the United States
- Coordinates: 41°32′18″N 75°32′12″W
- Country: United States
- State: Pennsylvania
- County: Lackawanna

Area
  - Total: 2.45 sq mi (6.34 km^{2})
  - Land: 2.45 sq mi (6.34 km^{2})
  - Water: 0 sq mi (0.00 km^{2})
- Elevation: 1,004 ft (306 m)

Population (2020)
  - Total: 1,763
  - Density: 720.6/sq mi (278.24/km^{2})
- Time zone: UTC-5 (EST)
  - Summer (DST): UTC-4 (EDT)
- ZIP Code: 18433
- Area code: 570
- FIPS code: 42-48176
- Website: mayfieldborough.org

Mayfield is a borough in Lackawanna County, Pennsylvania, United States, approximately 14 miles (23 km) northeast of Scranton. In the past, it contained a silk mill and a coal mining industry. The population was 1,763 at the 2020 census.

== Geography ==
Mayfield is located at 41°32′18″N 75°32′12″W (41.538331, -75.536554).

According to the United States Census Bureau, the borough has a total area of 2.4 square miles (6.2 km^{2}), all land.

== Demographics ==
Historical population
Census	Pop.	Note	%±
1890	1,695		—
1900	2,300		35.7%
1910	3,662		59.2%
1920	3,832		4.6%
1930	3,774		−1.5%
1940	3,172		−16.0%
1950	2,373		−25.2%
1960	1,996		−15.9%
1970	2,176		9.0%
1980	1,812		−16.7%
1990	1,890		4.3%
2000	1,756		−7.1%
2010	1,807		2.9%
2020	1,763		−2.4%
2021 (est.)	1,756	▼	−0.4%

As of the census of 2000, there were 1,756 people, 744 households, and 503 families residing in the borough. The population density was 718.6 inhabitants per square mile (277.5/km^{2}). There were 795 housing units at an average density of 325.3 units per square mile (125.6 units/km^{2}). The racial makeup of the borough was 99.43% White, 0.06% African American, 0.11% Native American, 0.17% Asian, 0.06% from other races, and 0.17% from two or more races. Hispanic or Latino of any race were 0.40% of the population.

There were 744 households, 26.1% had children under the age of 18 living with them, 51.6% were married couples living together, 12.1% had a female householder with no husband present, and 32.3% were non-families. 29.0% of households were made up of individuals, and 16.8% were one person aged 65 or older. The average household size was 2.36 and the average family size was 2.92.

In the borough the population was spread out, with 20.0% under the age of 18, 6.3% from 18 to 24, 29.2% from 25 to 44, 23.2% from 45 to 64, and 21.2% 65 or older. The median age was 42 years. For every 100 females there were 89.2 males. For every 100 females age 18 and over, there were 86.1 males.

The median household income was $30,074 and the median family income was $38,167. Males had a median income of $29,336 versus $20,427 for females. The per capita income for the borough was $17,106. About 6.0% of families and 7.5% of the population were below the poverty line, including 3.2% of those under age 18 and 10.1% of those age 65 or over.

== See also ==
- John Terpak
- St. Rose Academy (Mayfield, Pennsylvania)
