= Curtain Club =

Student organization at the University of Texas at Austin

The Curtain Club is a performance group, a campus theatrical society and the oldest student organization of University of Texas at Austin. It produced many theatrical productions participated by eminent theater personalities. At various times included among its numbers Zachary Scott, John and Nellie Connelly, Rip Torn, Pat Hingle and Tommy Tune. Many Texas politicians, entertainers and public figures joined the club when they were UT students. The Curtain club had a profound impact on the foundation of the Department of Drama.

== Sources ==
- http://www.austinchronicle.com/arts/1998-04-17/523281/
- https://web.archive.org/web/20120123154057/http://www.finearts.utexas.edu/tad/about_us/history/curtain_club.cfm
- https://web.archive.org/web/20120509125839/http://bealonghorn.utexas.edu/whyut/student-life/orgs
