= National Natural Resources Conservation Foundation =

The National Natural Resources Conservation Foundation (NNRCF) is a nonprofit private organization established by the 1996 farm bill (P.L. 104–127) to promote and fund innovative solutions to conservation issues through effective partnerships.

The Foundation can accept gifts and raise money. It will conduct research, undertake educational activities, support demonstration projects, and make grants to state and local governments and nonprofit organizations. Appropriations were authorized at $1 million per year for 1997–99, but no appropriations were provided by the U.S. Congress, and the Foundation has not become operational.

Similar foundations have been created for several other natural resource areas.
