= Soil and Water Conservation Act =

United States law requiring a plan for soil and water conservation

The Soil and Water Conservation Act (RCA) is a 1977 law (P.L. 95-192) that requires the United States Department of Agriculture (USDA) to periodically prepare a national plan for soil and water conservation on private lands based on an inventory and appraisal of existing resource conditions and trends. Natural Resources Conservation Service (NRCS) is the lead agency in this effort, and completed appraisals in the early 1980s and late 1980s; a third appraisal was initiated in the early 1990s but was not completed. Only one national plan was adopted by USDA in 1982. Many of the activities envisioned when the RCA was enacted are being carried out, but it has not resulted in a single omnibus plan addressing conservation needs and priorities on private lands yet.
