= Transfer Act of 1905 =

U.S. law on forest reserves jurisdiction

- Long title: An Act providing for the transfer of forest reserves from the Department of the Interior to the Department of Agriculture.
- Nicknames: Forest Transfer Act of 1905
- Enacted by: the 58th United States Congress
- Effective: February 1, 1905

Citations
- Public law: Pub. L. 58–34
- Statutes at Large: 33 Stat. 628

Codification
- Titles amended: 16 U.S.C.: Conservation
- U.S.C. sections amended: 16 U.S.C. ch. 2, subch. I §§ 472, 476, 478, 495; 16 U.S.C. ch. 3, subch. I §§ 524, 551, 554, 554a; 16 U.S.C. ch. 4 § 615b

Legislative history
- Introduced in the House as H.R. 8460; Signed into law by President Theodore Roosevelt on February 1, 1905

The Transfer Act of 1905 (33 Stat. 628) transferred the forest reserves of the United States from the Department of the Interior, United States General Land Office to the Department of Agriculture, Bureau of Forestry.

== General information ==
On February 1, 1905, under the leadership of Gifford Pinchot, the National Forest Reserves were transferred from the Department of Interior to the Department of Agriculture. Gifford Pinchot was the head of the Division of Forestry which was part of the Department of Agriculture. This transfer included over 63 million acres (250,000 km^{2}) of forest reserves and over 500 employees. This legislation was the first forestry law to be passed. This act was significant because it caused the National Forest Reserves to shift roles from a recreational role to a more economic role using science-based management. In March 1905, the Division of Forestry was renamed the United States Forest Service.
