= Trout Brook (South Branch Tunkhannock Creek tributary) =

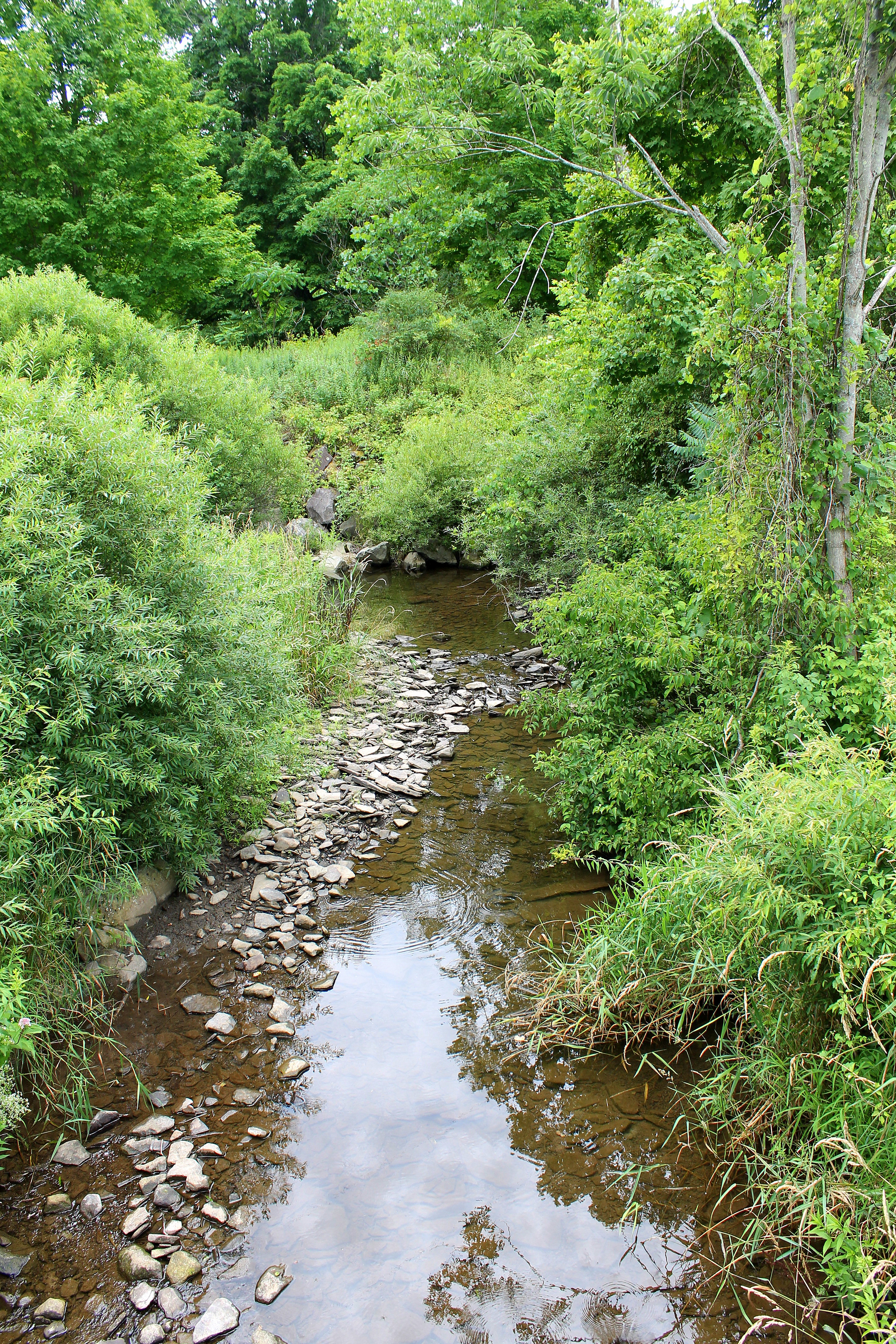
- Trout Brook in its lower reaches

Physical characteristics
- Source
  - location: pond or small lake in West Abington Township, Lackawanna County, Pennsylvania
  - elevation: between 1,180 and 1,200 feet (360 and 366 m)
- Mouth
  - location: South Branch Tunkhannock Creek in Clinton Township, Lackawanna County, Pennsylvania
  - coordinates: 41°33′09″N 75°49′44″W
  - elevation: 732 ft (223 m)
- Length: 5.0 mi (8.0 km)

Basin features
- Progression: South Branch Tunkhannock Creek → Tunkhannock Creek → Susquehanna River → Chesapeake Bay
- Tributaries
  - left: five unnamed tributaries
  - right: five unnamed tributaries

Trout Brook is a tributary of South Branch Tunkhannock Creek in Lackawanna County and Wyoming County, in Pennsylvania, in the United States. It is approximately 5.0 miles (8.0 km) long and flows through West Abington Township in Lackawanna County and Clinton Township in Wyoming County. The stream has no named tributaries, but it does have ten unnamed tributaries. There are also a number of wetlands in the watershed of the stream. The stream is classified as a Coldwater Fishery. Its watershed occupies portions of three municipalities in Wyoming County and five in Lackawanna County.

== Course ==
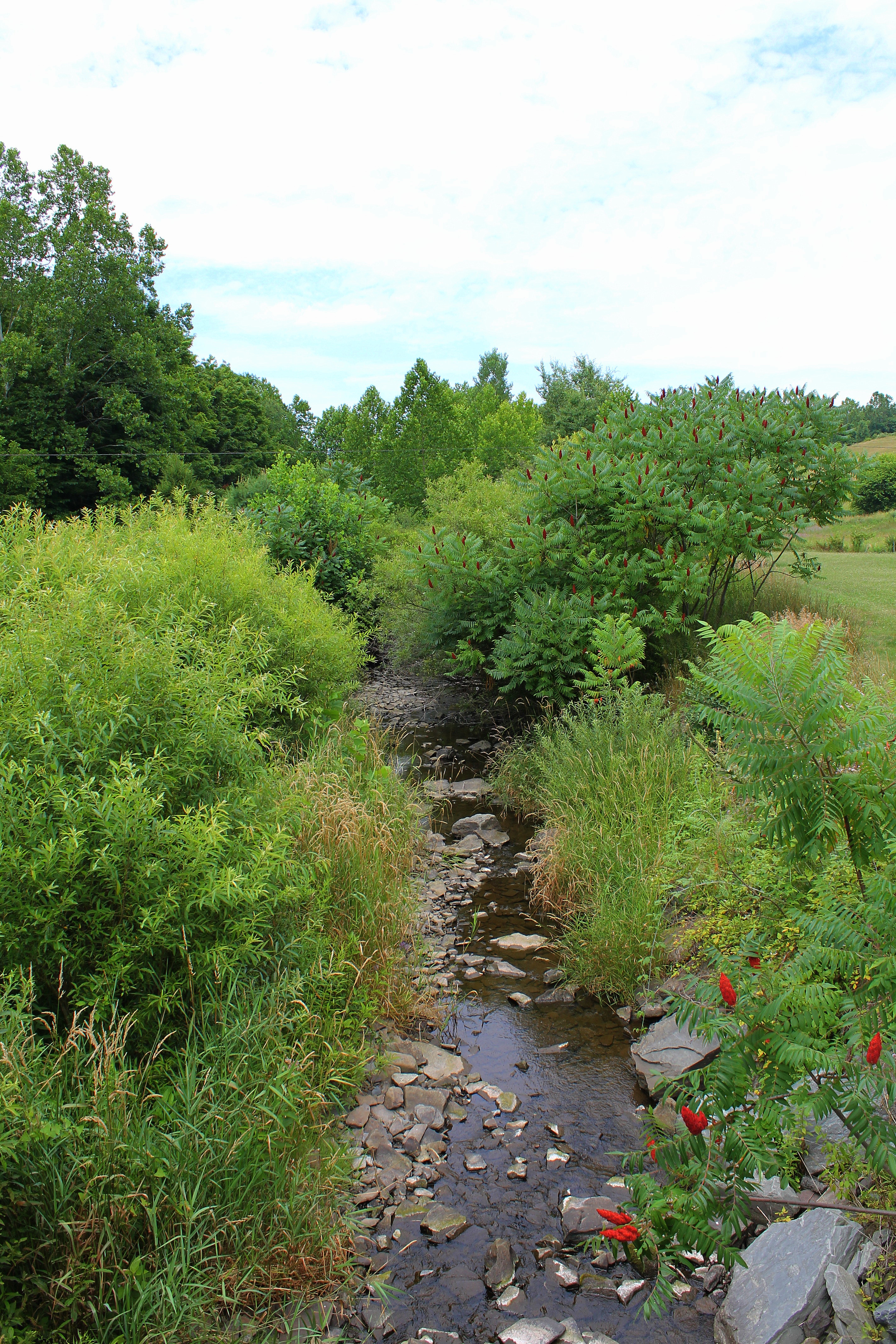
Trout Brook

Trout Brook begins in a pond or small lake in West Abington Township, to the northeast of Wilbur Hill. It flows northwest for a short distance before turning north for several tenths of a mile, passing through one pond or small lake and entering another, where it receives an unnamed tributary from the right. The stream then turns west-northwest for a short distance before turning north-northwest and passing through two more lakes and receiving an unnamed tributary from the left and two more from the right. The stream then turns northwest for several tenths of a mile before exiting West Abington Township and Lackawanna County.

Upon exiting Lackawanna County, Trout Brook enters Clinton Township, Wyoming County. It heads west-northwest for several tenths of a mile, receiving two unnamed tributaries from the left and one from the right, and then turns southwest. After a few tenths of a mile, it turns west-northwest for several tenths of a mile, receiving one unnamed tributary from the left and one from the right. The stream then turns west-southwest for several tenths of a mile before receiving a final unnamed tributary from the left. It then turns northwest for several tenths of a mile before reaching its confluence with South Branch Tunkhannock Creek.

== Geography and geology ==
The elevation near the mouth of Trout Brook is 732 feet (223 m) above sea level. The elevation of the stream's source is between 1,180 and 1,200 feet (360 and 366 m) above sea level.

== Watershed and biology ==
Trout Brook is located entirely within the United States Geological Survey quadrangle of Factoryville. The watershed of the stream is located mainly in Clinton Township, Wyoming County; Overfield Township, Wyoming County; and West Abington Township, Lackawanna County. Smaller areas of the watershed are in Factoryville, Wyoming County; La Plume Township, Lackawanna County; Dalton, Lackawanna County; and Glenburn Township, Lackawanna County.

Trout Brook flows alongside roads for most of its length. There are numerous wetlands and ponds or lakes in the stream's watershed.

Trout Brook and all of its unnamed tributaries are classified as Coldwater Fisheries.

== History ==
Trout Brook was entered into the Geographic Names Information System on January 1, 1990 due to its presence in Israel C. White's 1883 book The geology of the North Branch Susquehanna River Region in the six counties of Wyoming, Lackawanna, Luzerne, Columbia, Montour and Northumberland. Its identifier in the Geographic Names Information System is 1202092.

== See also ==
- Ackerly Creek, next tributary of South Branch Tunkhannock Creek going upstream
- List of rivers of Pennsylvania
