= South Branch Tunkhannock Creek =

Tributary of Tunkhannock Creek in Pennsylvania, USA

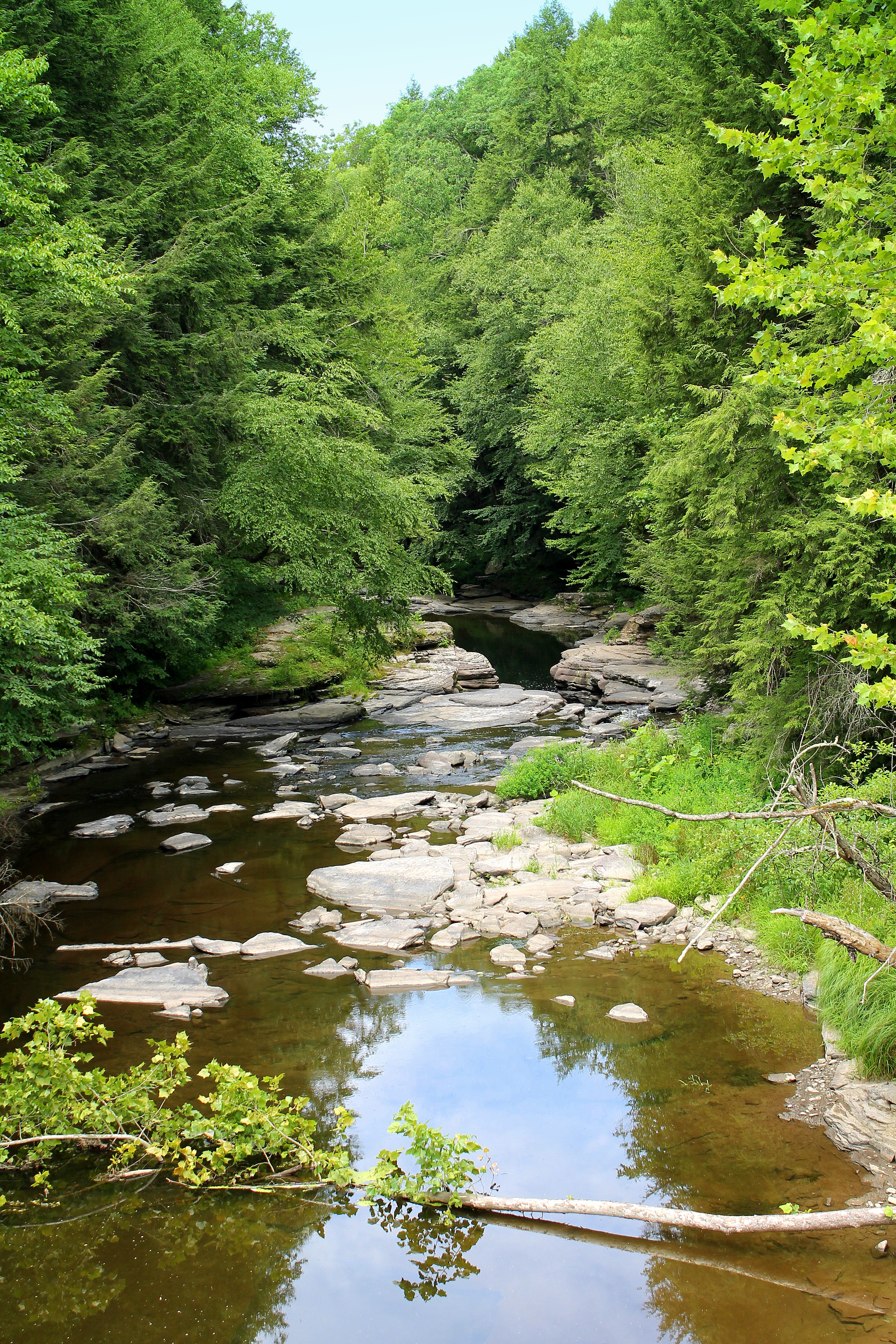
- South Branch Tunkhannock Creek looking downstream at Little Rocky Glen

Physical characteristics
- Source
  - location: pond or small lake between Hubbard Mountain and Meyers Mountain in Scott Township, Lackawanna County, Pennsylvania
  - elevation: between 1,380 and 1,400 feet (421 and 427 m)
- Mouth
  - location: Tunkhannock Creek at Bardwell in Tunkhannock Township, Wyoming County, Pennsylvania
  - coordinates: 41°33′46″N 75°52′31″W
  - elevation: 627 ft (191 m)
- Length: 22.5 mi (36.2 km)
- Basin size: 98.3 sq mi (255 km^{2})
- Discharge
  - average: 102.4 cu ft/s (2.90 m^{3}/s) (near Factoryville)

Basin features
- Progression: Tunkhannock Creek → Susquehanna River → Chesapeake Bay
- Tributaries
  - left: Kennedy Creek, Ackerly Creek, Trout Brook

South Branch Tunkhannock Creek is a tributary of Tunkhannock Creek in Lackawanna County and Wyoming County, in Pennsylvania, in the United States. It is approximately 22.5 miles (36.2 km) long and flows through Scott Township, Benton Township, North Abington Township, and La Plume Township in Lackawanna County and Clinton Township, Factoryville, and Tunkhannock Township in Wyoming County. The watershed of the creek has an area of 98.3 square miles (255 km^{2}). The creek's named tributaries include Trout Brook, Ackerly Creek, and Kennedy Creek. South Branch Tunkhannock Creek is not designated as an impaired waterbody and has relatively good water quality.

The topography of the watershed of South Branch Tunkhannock Creek has been described as "rough and hilly" and the underlying geology consists of interbedded sedimentary rock. There is a gorge with a depth of 100 feet (30 m) on the creek at one point. Major land uses in the watershed of South Branch Tunkhannock Creek include forested land and agricultural land. Some natural gas drilling is also done in the watershed. Historical industries in the area included agriculture and summer resorts. The Delaware, Lackawanna and Western Railroad also passed through the creek's watershed.

The main stem of South Branch Tunkhannock Creek is designated as a Trout Stocked Fishery and a Migratory Fishery. The creek has a diverse array of aquatic life and has been stocked with trout. A reach of the creek navigable by canoe and the creek is also a highly popular stream for angling. It passes through Lackawanna State Park.

== Course ==
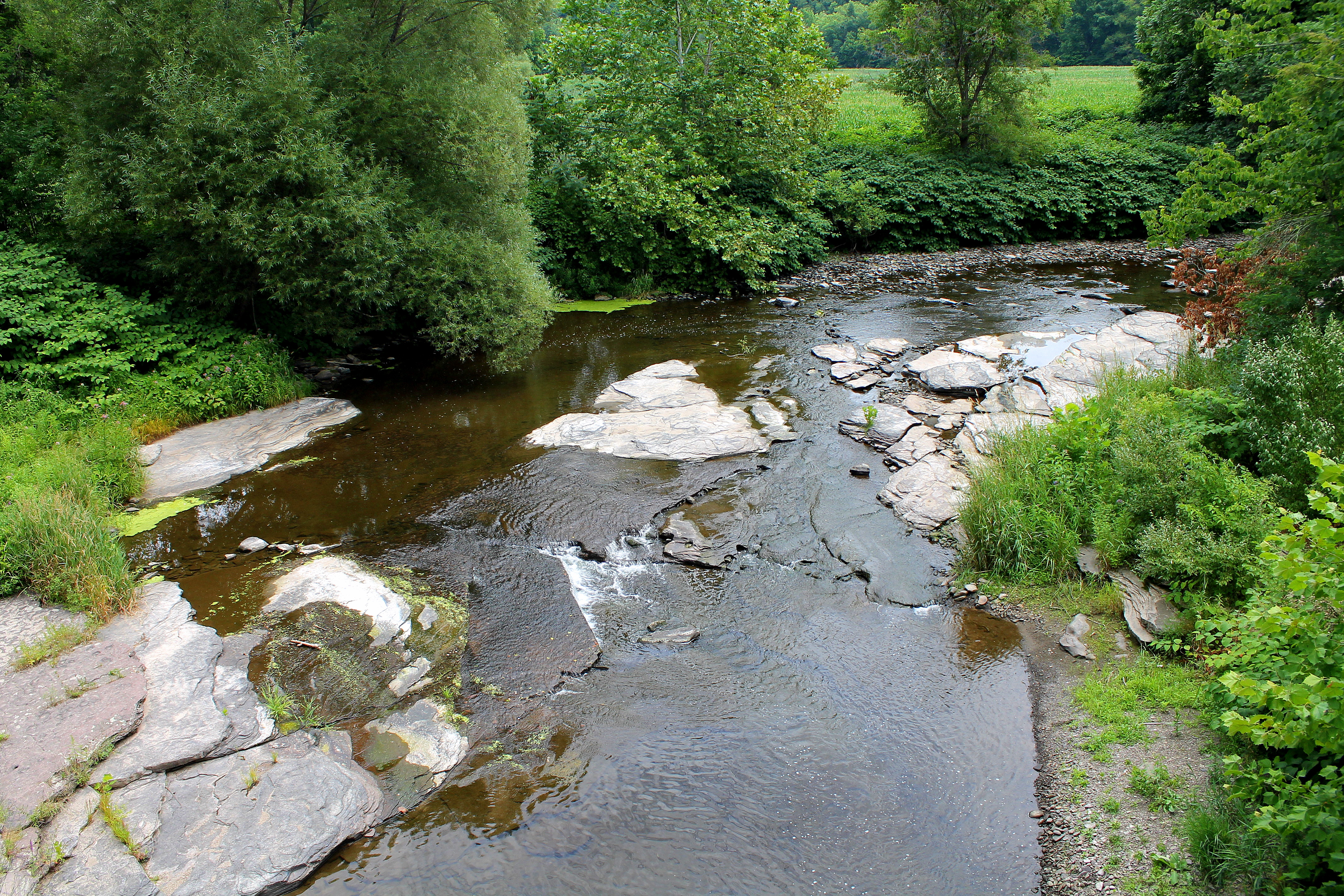
South Branch Tunkhannock Creek looking upstream above Little Rocky Glen

South Branch Tunkhannock Creek begins in a pond or small lake in Scott Township, Lackawanna County, between Hubbard Mountain and Meyers Mountain. It flows northwest through a valley for several tenths of a mile alongside Pennsylvania Route 247 before crossing that highway. The creek then turns north-northwest for a few miles, flowing alongside Pennsylvania Route 438. It then turns northwest for several tenths of a mile, still following Pennsylvania Route 438, before turning north-northwest for a few tenths of a mile. At this point, the creek gradually turns southwest, crossing Interstate 81, leaving Pennsylvania Route 438 behind, and flowing along the border between Benton Township and North Abington Township. After several tenths of a mile, the creek turns west-northwest for more than a mile, entering Lackawanna Lake, where it receives Kennedy Creek, its first named tributary, from the left.

From the southwestern end of Lake Lackawanna, South Branch Tunkhannock Creek flows northwest for more than a mile before turning west for a few miles and entering La Plume Township. The creek then turns south for several tenths of a mile, briefly flowing along the border between La Plume Township, Lackawanna County and Clinton Township, Wyoming County. It then crosses US Route 6 and receives the tributary Ackerly Creek from the right. The creek then turns west for a few tenths of a mile, exiting La Plume Township and Lackawanna County.

Upon exiting Lackawanna County, South Branch Tunkhannock Creek enters Factoryville, in Wyoming County. Here, the creek flows northwest for several tenths of a mile before entering Clinton Township. Here, it turns southwest and then northwest before meandering west-southwest alongside US Route 6 for a few miles. In this reach, it receives the tributary Trout Brook from the left before turning west, entering Tunkhannock Township, and meandering west-northwest for a few miles. The creek then crosses US Route 6 and after several tenths of a mile, reaches its confluence with Tunkhannock Creek.

South Branch Tunkhannock Creek joins Tunkhannock Creek 6.40 miles (10.30 km) upstream of its mouth.

=== Tributaries ===
South Branch Tunkhannock Creek has three named tributaries: Kennedy Creek, Ackerly Creek, and Trout Brook. Kennedy Creek joins South Branch Tunkhannock Creek 12.82 miles (20.63 km) upstream of its mouth, at Carpenter Town, and drains an area of 6.17 square miles (16.0 km^{2}). Ackerly Creek joins South Branch Tunkhannock Creek 7.54 miles (12.13 km) upstream of its mouth.

== Hydrology ==
In the part of the watershed of South Branch Tunkhannock Creek that is above Factoryville, a total of 26.7 miles (43.0 km) of streams are classified as impaired. Of these, 14.4 miles (23.2 km) are impaired by pathogens from an unknown source, 10.2 miles (16.4 km) are impaired by urban runoff, and 2.1 miles (3.4 km) are impaired by municipal point source pollution. Some factors causing impacts to the creek's watershed include urban sprawl and poorly managed stormwater. Runoff events are also impacting the floodplains, streambanks, and stream channels in the watershed. However, the creek largely has good water quality. It is not designated as an impaired waterbody.

Near Factoryville, the average annual discharge of South Branch Tunkhannock Creek is 102.4 cubic feet per second (2.90 m^{3}/s). The maximum flow time from the headwaters of the creek to this point is 21 hours and 57 minutes. The average monthly recharge of the creek at Montdale, in terms of percentage of the total annual recharge of the creek, ranges from 1.8 percent in August to 19.2 percent in March. In 1976, the water temperature of the creek near Tunkhannock ranged from 4 to 22 °C (39 to 72 °F).

In the 1960s and/or 1970s, the turbidity of South Branch Tunkhannock Creek near Tunkhannock ranged from 4 to 22 Jackson Turbidity Units. The specific conductance of the creek ranged from 70 to 200 micro-siemens per centimeter. The concentration of suspended solids ranged from 0 to 8 milligrams per liter (0.0000 to 0.0080 oz/cu ft). The water hardness of the creek ranged from 5 to 100 milligrams per liter (0.0050 to 0.0999 oz/cu ft).

In the 1960s and/or 1970s, the pH of South Branch Tunkhannock Creek near Tunkhannock ranged from 4.6 to 7.6. The concentration of dissolved oxygen ranged from 9.1 to 13.4 milligrams per liter (0.0091 to 0.0134 oz/cu ft) and the carbon dioxide concentration ranged from 2 to 197 milligrams per liter (0.0020 to 0.1968 oz/cu ft). The bicarbonate concentration ranged from 9 to 19 milligrams per liter (0.0090 to 0.0190 oz/cu ft).

The concentration of albuminoid nitrogen in South Branch Tunkhannock Creek near Tunkhannock was once measured to be 0.02 milligrams per liter (2.0×10^{−5} oz/cu ft) the 1970s. The concentration of phosphates ranged from 0.012 to 0.153 milligrams per liter (1.2×10^{−5} to 0.000153 oz/cu ft), while the orthophosphate concentration was 0.01 milligrams per liter (1.00×10^{−5} oz/cu ft) and the phosphorus concentration ranged from 0.05 to 0.25 milligrams per liter (5.0×10^{−5} to 0.000250 oz/cu ft). The concentration of organic carbon was once measured to be 6 milligrams per liter (0.0060 oz/cu ft). The chloride concentration in the creek's filtered waters in the 1960s and/or 1970s ranged from 1 to 30 milligrams per liter (0.00100 to 0.02997 oz/cu ft) and the fluoride concentration ranged from 0 to 0.2 milligrams per liter (0.00000 to 0.00020 oz/cu ft) in filtered waters. The sulfate concentration ranged from 0 to 206 milligrams per liter (0.000 to 0.206 oz/cu ft) and the silica concentration ranged from 4.3 to 4.9 milligrams per liter (0.0043 to 0.0049 oz/cu ft). The ammonia concentration in unfiltered waters ranged from less than 0.013 milligrams per liter (1.3×10^{−5} oz/cu ft) to 13.4 milligrams per liter (0.0134 oz/cu ft) and the nitrate concentration in filtered water ranged from 0 to 0.2 milligrams per liter (0.00000 to 0.00020 oz/cu ft).

In the 1960s and/or 1970s, the magnesium concentration in the filtered water of South Branch Tunkhannock Creek near Tunkhannock ranged from less than 0.1 milligrams per liter (0.000100 oz/cu ft) to 3 milligrams per liter (0.0030 oz/cu ft), while the calcium concentration ranged from 1.3 to 17.6 milligrams per liter (0.0013 to 0.0176 oz/cu ft). In 1973, the concentration of barium was once measured to be 110 micrograms per liter (0.00011 oz/cu ft), the concentration of strontium was 20 micrograms per liter (2.0×10^{−5} oz/cu ft), and the beryllium concentration was less than 1 microgram per liter (1.00×10^{−6} oz/cu ft). In the 1960s and/or 1970s, the concentrations of sodium and potassium in the creek's filtered water ranged from 0.4 to 1.7 milligrams per liter (0.00040 to 0.00170 oz/cu ft) and 0 to 0.3 milligrams per liter (0.00000 to 0.00030 oz/cu ft), respectively. In 1973, the lithium concentration was once measured to be 10 micrograms per liter (1.00×10^{−5} oz/cu ft). In the 1960s and/or 1970s, the concentration of recoverable iron in the creek's unfiltered water ranged from 30 to 80,000 micrograms per liter (3.0×10^{−5} to 0.079908 oz/cu ft) and the concentration of recoverable manganese ranged from 90 to 400 micrograms per liter (9.0×10^{−5} to 0.000400 oz/cu ft).

In 1973, the concentration of bismuth in South Branch Tunkhannock Creek ranged was found to be less than 2 micrograms per liter (2.0×10^{−6} oz/cu ft) in one measurement, as were the chromium, germanium, silver, and tin concentrations. The concentrations of molybdenum, vanadium, and gallium were less than 1 microgram per liter (1.00×10^{−6} oz/cu ft). Traces of boron, cadmium, cobalt, copper, lead, and nickel were also observed. The zinc concentration was 50 micrograms per liter (5.0×10^{−5} oz/cu ft), the aluminum concentration was 150 micrograms per liter (0.00015 oz/cu ft), and the titanium concentration was 7 micrograms per liter (7.0×10^{−6} oz/cu ft). The zirconium concentration was 3 micrograms per liter (3.0×10^{−6} oz/cu ft).

At the Pennsylvania Route 438 bridge near the village of Scott, the peak annual discharge of South Branch Tunkhannock Creek has a 1 percent chance of reaching 2,460 cubic feet per second (70 m^{3}/s). Approximately 2,000 feet (610 m) further upstream, it has a 1 percent chance of reaching 2,240 cubic feet per second (63 m^{3}/s) and at a Pennsylvania Route 438 bridge further upstream, it has a 1 percent chance of reaching 1,970 cubic feet per second (56 m^{3}/s). Below a tributary known as South Branch Tunkhannock Creek Tributary J, the peak annual discharge has a 1 percent chance of reaching 1,730 cubic feet per second (49 m^{3}/s).

== Geography, geology, and climate ==
The elevation near the mouth of South Branch Tunkhannock Creek is 627 feet (191 m) above sea level. The elevation of the creek's source is between 1,380 and 1,400 feet (421 and 427 m) above sea level. From its upper reaches to an elevation of 1,100 feet (340 m) above sea level, the creek's gradient is 74.3 feet per mile (14.07 m/km). From this point downstream to 1,000 feet (300 m) above sea level, the gradient is only 13.3 feet per mile (2.52 m/km).

The underlying geology of the watershed of South Branch Tunkhannock Creek mainly includes interbedded sedimentary rock. In the upper 12.70 square miles (32.9 km^{2}), upstream of Montdale, the watershed is entirely on shale and sandstone rocks.

The topography of the watershed of South Branch Tunkhannock Creek was described as "rough and hilly" in a 1921 book. The valley of the creek's main stem is surrounded by steep hills and some reaches have alluvial floodplains. Numerous small lakes and swamps dot the watershed. A mountain known as Tunkhannock Mountain is located in the vicinity of the creek. It is linked by Bowman Mountain and Eaton Knob to the North Mountain region, although the three peaks are considerably lower than North Mountain.

The channel of South Branch Tunkhannock Creek is sinuous and flows through glacial drift and rock formations consisting of sandstone. The creek has many rock gardens, cobble riffles, and several rock ledges, including one large one. Additionally, the creek flows through a 100-foot (30 m) deep gorge carved through sandstone and shale. In the gorge, the creek carves tubs and potholes and flows through a narrow chasm into a large pool. There is also another chasm in the gorge, where the creek drops 6 feet (1.8 m). There is also a mushroom-shaped rock outcropping in the gorge. The creek also has some strainers.

The average annual rate of precipitation in the watershed of South Branch Tunkhannock Creek is 35 to 40 inches (89 to 102 cm).

== Watershed ==
The watershed of South Branch Tunkhannock Creek has an area of 98.3 square miles (255 km^{2}). Upstream of Factoryville, the watershed has an area of 70.5 square miles (183 km^{2}). The mouth of the creek is in the United States Geological Survey quadrangle of Tunkhannock. However, its source is in the quadrangle of Carbondale. The creek also passes through the quadrangles of Dalton and Factoryville. The mouth of the creek is located at Bardwell. South Branch Tunkhannock Creek flows in a generally westerly direction, although its route is circuitous.

In the portion of the watershed of South Branch Tunkhannock Creek that is above Factoryville, there are 123.5 miles (198.8 km) of streams. There are more than twenty named ponds, lakes, and swamps in the watershed of South Branch Tunkhannock Creek. There are also dozens of unnamed ones.

The watershed of South Branch Tunkhannock Creek is mostly in northwestern Lackawanna County and northeastern Wyoming County, although a small corner of it is in southern Susquehanna County. As of 2010, the population of the portion of the watershed above Factoryville is 15,897. In terms of population, the creek's watershed is the fastest-growing area in the Tunkhannock Creek drainage basin. As of 2006, the dominant land uses in this part of the watershed are forested land, which occupies 54.66 percent of the area; and agricultural land, which occupies 32.42 percent of the land area. Other land uses include developed land (5.25 percent), grassland/herbaceous land (3.27 percent), water (1.74 percent), wetlands (1.29 percent), and barren or extractive land (0.09 percent). The creek itself mostly flows through sparsely populated and forested terrain (except for Factoryville), although it flows alongside the busy US Route 6 for a substantial part of its length.

There are three natural gas drilling pads tracked by the Susquehanna River Basin Commission in the watershed of South Branch Tunkhannock Creek upstream of Factoryville. There are no permitted natural gas water withdrawals in this part of the watershed. However, the public water supply includes 56 groundwater withdrawals and no surface water withdrawals. There are 23 National Pollutant Discharge Elimination System sites in the watershed above Factoryville: 19 for wastewater treatment plants, 3 for stormwater, and 1 for industrial purposes.

Keystone College is in the watershed of South Branch Tunkhannock Creek, near the mouth of the tributary Ackerly Creek. South Branch Tunkhannock Creek is in the Endless Mountains region of Pennsylvania.

== History ==
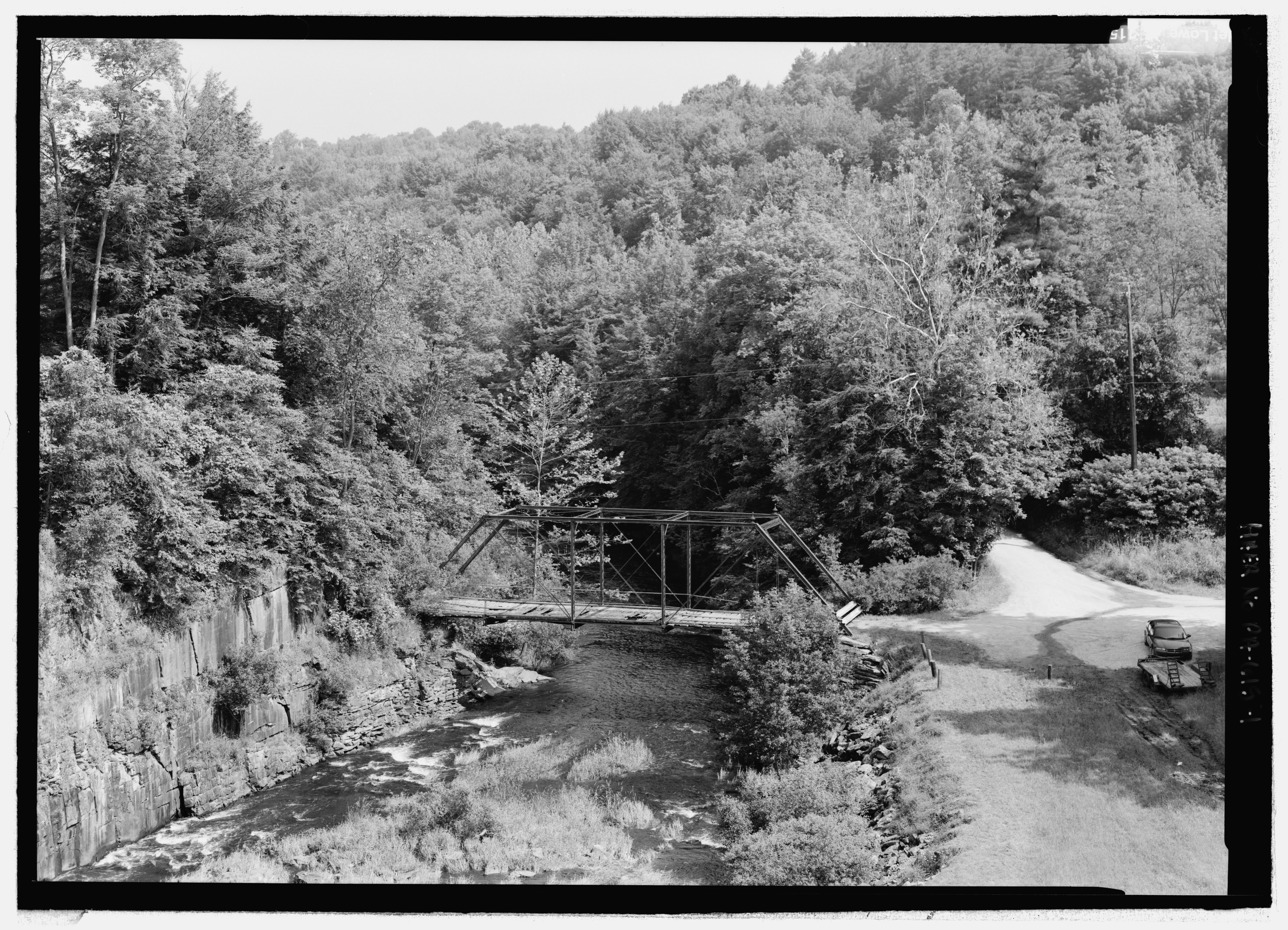
View of South Branch Tunkhannock Creek and the Slates' Mill Bridge

South Branch Tunkhannock Creek was entered into the Geographic Names Information System on August 2, 1979. Its identifier in the Geographic Names Information System is 1188041.

European settlers first arrived in Factoryville, on South Branch Tunkhannock Creek in the early 1800s. In the mid-1810s, a hydro-powered textile mill was built in Factoryville, but it eventually went bankrupt. A Pratt through truss that carries Township Road 439 over the creek in Benton Township, Lackawanna County was built in 1885 and is on the Historic American Engineering Record. The bridge has a moderate span and is known as the Slates' Mill Bridge or the Tunkhannock Creek Bridge.

In the early 1900s, major industries in the watershed of South Branch Tunkhannock Creek included agriculture and summer resorts. The Delaware, Lackawanna and Western Railroad crossed through the watershed during this time period. Streams in the creek's watershed also provided water power for flour and lumber mills at Laplume, Dalton, and Factoryville. The major communities in the watershed at this time included Dalton, Factoryville, Glenburn, Fleetville, Laplume, Bardwell, and East Benton.

One of the major features of the Hallstead Cutoff was an embankment in the vicinity of South Branch Tunkhannock Creek. It is 140 feet (43 m) high, 2,000 feet (610 m) long, and has a volume of at least 1,000,000 cubic yards (760,000 m^{3}) of fill. It was constructed in the early 1900s.

In 2003, a grassroots citizens' group known as the South Branch Tunkhannock Creek Watershed Coalition was formed for the purposes of conservation in the watershed of South Branch Tunkhannock Creek. In 2004, they began doing monthly monitoring of water quality, gauging water temperature, pH, the concentration of dissolved oxygen, alkalinity, and the concentration of nitrates and orthophosphates. Since 2005, the organization has also been doing semiannual monitoring of macroinvertebrates in the watershed.

== Biology ==
The main stem of South Branch Tunkhannock Creek is designated as a Trout-Stocked Fishery and a Migratory Fishery. The main stem of the tributary Ackerly Creek also holds these designations. However, all other stream's in the watershed of South Branch Tunkhannock Creek are designated as Coldwater Fisheries and Migratory Fisheries. The creek is classified by the Pennsylvania Fish and Boat Commission as Approved Trout Waters. On a 1-mile (1.6 km) long reach of the creek between US Route 6 and the Keystone College campus, a Delayed Harvest Artificial Lures Only regulation is in effect. Brown trout and rainbow trout have been stocked in reaches of the creek by the Pennsylvania Fish and Boat Commission.

South Branch Tunkhannock Creek supports a relatively diverse array of aquatic fauna.

Forests of eastern hemlock occur near South Branch Tunkhannock Creek along Little Rocky Glen, and ferns grow on ledges near the glen.

== Recreation ==
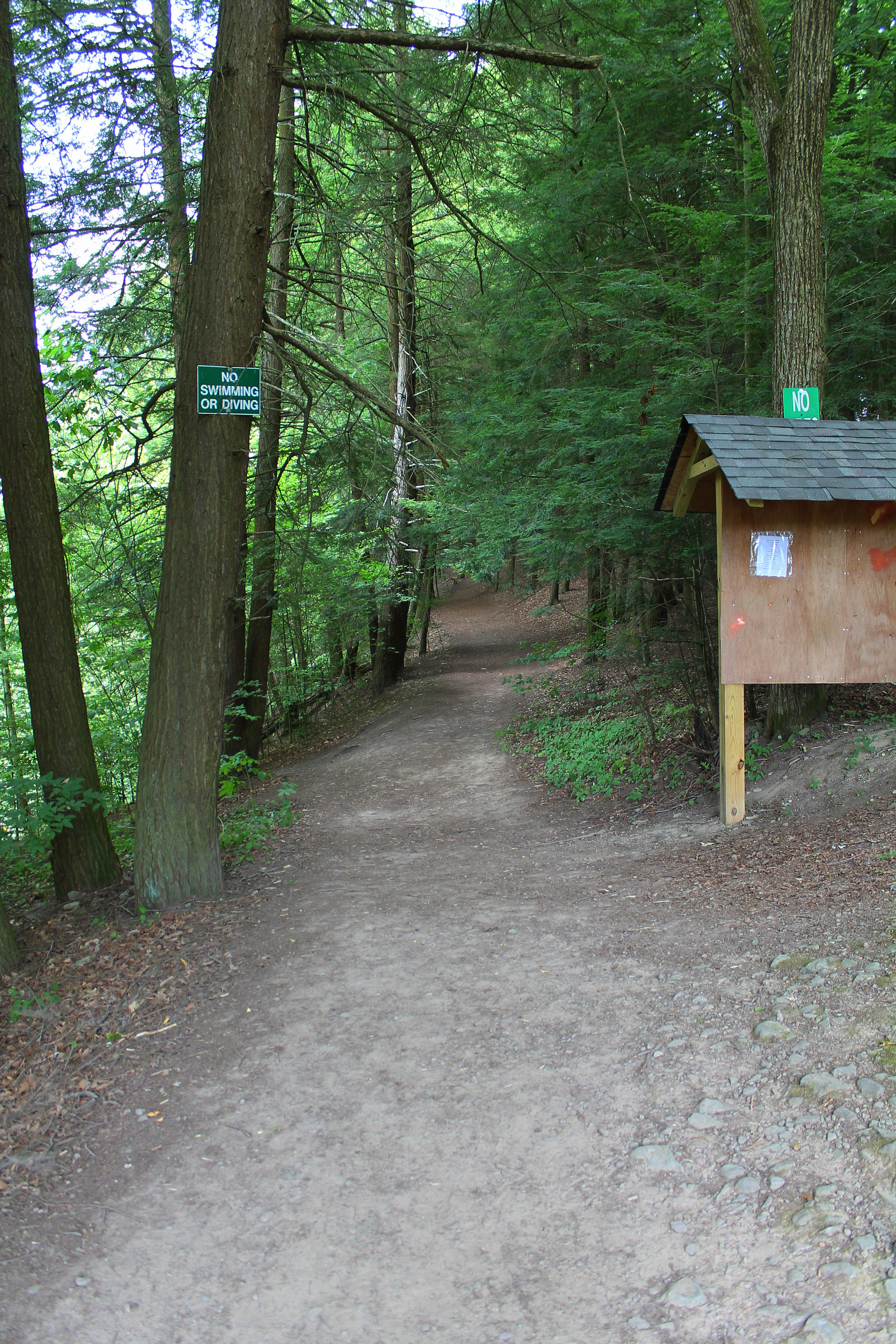
Trail at Little Rocky Glen near South Branch Tunkhannock Creek

At least 10.0 miles (16.1 km) of South Branch Tunkhannock Creek, downstream of a bridge carrying Pennsylvania Route 438, are navigable by canoe during snowmelt and within three days of heavy rain. The creek's difficulty rating typically ranges from 1 to 2-, although there is one class 3–4 rapid, at Little Rocky Glen. The scenery is described as "good" in Edward Gertler's book Keystone Canoeing.

South Branch Tunkhannock Creek is relatively popular with kayakers and is also highly popular with anglers. However, the creek is highly powerful at Little Rocky Glen and several people have drowned in it.

Lackawanna State Park is in the watershed of South Branch Tunkhannock Creek. The Countryside Conservancy owns a small preserve called Little Rocky Glen on the creek. Although there are several recognizable easy-to-moderate paths in the preserve, there is no formal trail system. Hikes known as the North Woods Trail and the Lackawanna Lake Loop are also in the vicinity of the creek at Lackawanna State Park. The first trail is of moderate difficulty and is 6.1 miles (9.8 km) long, while the second is easy to moderate and is 5.3 miles (8.5 km).

South Branch Tunkhannock Creek is described as "beautiful" at Lackawanna State Park in Jeff Mitchell's book Hiking the Endless Mountains: Exploring the Wilderness of Northeastern.

== See also ==
- Billings Mill Brook, next tributary of Tunkhannock Creek going downstream
- Oxbow Creek, next tributary of Tunkhannock Creek going upstream
- List of rivers of Pennsylvania
