= Ackerly Creek =

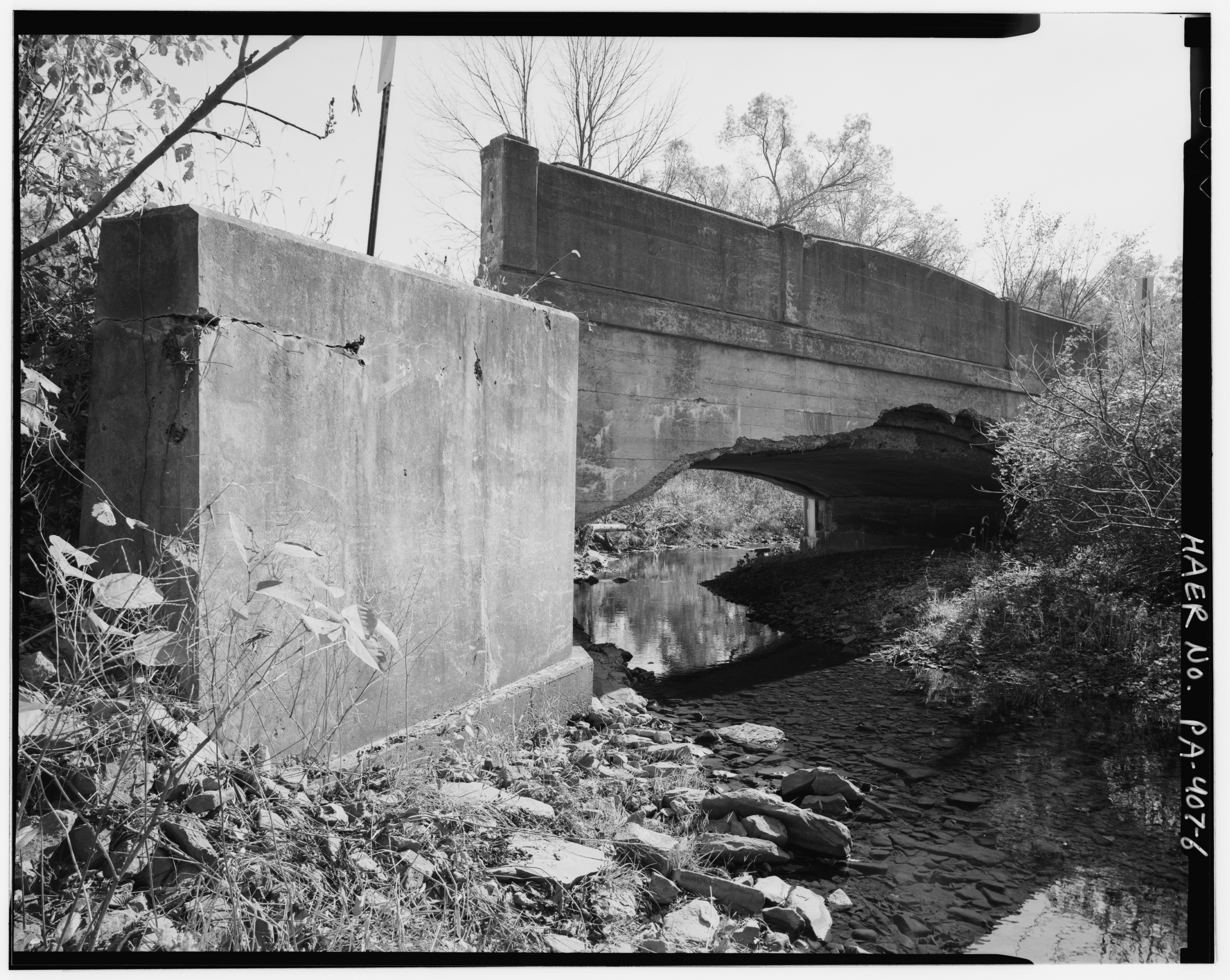
- Ackerly Creek at the Ackerly Creek Bridge

Physical characteristics
- Source
  - location: unnamed lake and swamp in South Abington Township, Lackawanna County, Pennsylvania
  - elevation: between 1,420 and 1,440 feet (433 and 439 m)
- Mouth
  - location: South Branch Tunkhannock Creek in La Plume Township, Lackawanna County, Pennsylvania
  - coordinates: 41°33′34″N 75°46′20″W
  - elevation: between 820 and 840 feet (250 and 256 m)
- Length: 8.7 mi (14.0 km)
- Basin size: 18 mi^{2} (47 km^{2})

Basin features
- Progression: South Branch Tunkhannock Creek → Tunkhannock Creek → Susquehanna River → Chesapeake Bay
- Tributaries
  - left: various unnamed tributaries
  - right: various unnamed tributaries

Ackerly Creek is a tributary of South Branch Tunkhannock Creek in Lackawanna County, Pennsylvania, in the United States. It is approximately 8.7 miles (14.0 km) long and flows through South Abington Township, Waverly Township, Glenburn Township, Dalton, and La Plume Township. The creek has several unnamed tributaries and drains an area of nearly 18 square miles (47 km^{2}). Ackerly Creek is not designated as an impaired waterbody, but it is impacted by some water quality problems. In one reach, the creek flows through Rabbit Hollow, which is set aside as a preserve. The creek experiences some erosion due to its banks being managed and straightened where it flows alongside US Route 6 and US Route 11.

The watershed of Ackerly Creek mainly consists of suburban and residential land use, but there are some urbanized areas. It is both the southernmost and most developed part of the watershed of Tunkhannock Creek. There is also a former Superfund site in the creek's watershed. Several historic sites are in the watershed, and a bridge on the Historic American Engineering Record crosses the creek. The watershed of Ackerly Creek is designated as a Coldwater Fishery and a Migratory Fishery and is inhabited by some trout, as of the 1990s. Numerous recreational sites, both public and private, exist within the creek's watershed.

== Course ==
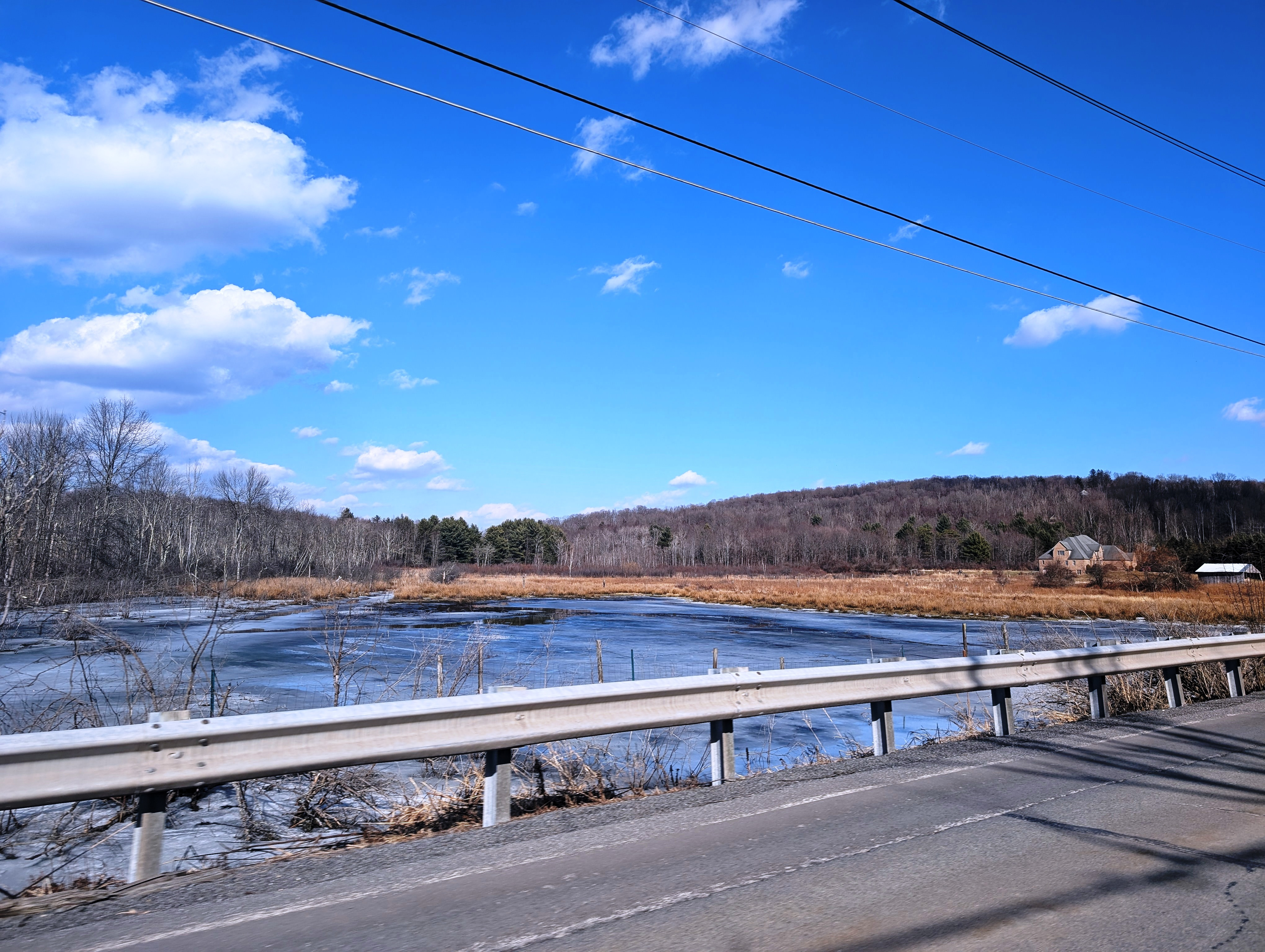
Frozen Ackerly Creek swampland off PA 632

Ackerly Creek begins in an unnamed lake in South Abington Township. It flows southwest for a few tenths of a mile before turning northwest for several tenths of a mile and entering Waverly Township. It then turns west-southwest for more than a mile, passing near the census-designated place of Waverly and crossing Pennsylvania Route 407. The creek then briefly turns west-northwest before turning west-southwest again, crossing a railroad, and entering Glenburn Township and the census-designated place of Glenburn. At this point, it turns north for a few tenths of a mile before turning west across US Route 11 and entering Glenburn Pond.

From the northern end of Glenburn Pond, Ackerly Creek flows north-northwest alongside US Route 11 for a few miles, passing through Dalton and entering La Plume Township. There, the creek turns west for a short distance before turning northwest for several tenths of a mile. It then turns west for a few tenths of a mile before turning south and then west again. At this point, it reaches its confluence with South Branch Tunkhannock Creek.

Ackerly Creek joins South Branch Tunkhannock Creek 7.54 miles (12.13 km) upstream of its mouth.

=== Tributaries ===
Ackerly Creek has no named tributaries. However, it does have a number of unnamed tributaries joining from both sides, including UNT 28833, UTN 28835, UNT28836, and UNT28840. One major branch of the creek begins near Florey's wetlands and flows from Gravel Pond to Glenburn Pond.

== Hydrology ==
Ackerly Creek is not designated as an impaired waterbody. However, its tributary UNT 28835 is impaired. According to the Pennsylvania Department of Environmental Protection, the watershed of Ackerly Creek is the most "stressed" watershed in the Tunkhannock Creek drainage basin. In the 1970s, Ackerly Creek was found to be in good condition. However, there were very low flows at its headwaters.

Some sites in the watershed of Ackerly Creek experience problematic concentrations of ammonia, phosphates, and nitrates. Ackerly Creek is an intermittent stream. The creek's watershed is the only watershed in the Tunkhannock Creek drainage basin to have significant urban and suburban water quality impacts. There are stormwater problems in the watershed.

At the border between Dalton and La Plume Township, the peak annual discharge of Ackerly Creek has a 10 percent chance of reaching 3,220 cubic feet per second (91 m^{3}/s) and a 2 percent chance of reaching 4,620 cubic feet per second (131 m^{3}/s). It has a 1 percent chance of reaching 5,210 cubic feet per second (148 m^{3}/s) and a 0.2 percent chance of reaching 6,640 cubic feet per second (188 m^{3}/s). At the border between Dalton and Glenburn Township, the peak annual discharge of the creek has a 10 percent chance of reaching 2,430 cubic feet per second (69 m^{3}/s) and a 2 percent chance of reaching 3,530 cubic feet per second (100 m^{3}/s). It has a 1 percent chance of reaching 3,990 cubic feet per second (113 m^{3}/s) and a 0.2 percent chance of reaching 5,160 cubic feet per second (146 m^{3}/s). The peak annual discharge of the creek has a 1 percent chance of reaching 2,960 cubic feet per second (84 m^{3}/s) above Glenburn Pond.

Keystone College has a hydrogeology laboratory on Ackerly Creek.

== Geography and geology ==
The elevation of the mouth of Ackerly Creek is between 820 and 840 feet (250 and 256 m) above sea level. The elevation of the creek's source is between 1,420 and 1,440 feet (433 and 439 m) above sea level.

In one reach, Ackerly Creek flows through a hollow—a shallow valley— known as Rabbit Hollow. The creek was historically dammed to create a pond there, but there is no longer a pond at that location.

In a reach where Ackerly Creek flows alongside US Route 6 and US Route 11, it has been managed and straightened. This contributes significantly to streambank erosion on the creek. There are roughly a dozen sites with unstable stream bank, and there are several bridge crossings of the creek. There is relatively little garbage along the creek.

Although most of the watershed of Ackerly Creek has relatively little impervious cover, an area in the watershed's southernmost reach has approximately 40 percent impervious cover. The creek has a relatively broad and developed floodplain in Dalton. At least one railroad bridge crosses the creek.

== Watershed ==
The watershed of Ackerly Creek has an area of approximately 18 square miles (47 km^{2}). Ackerly Creek flows through the United States Geological Survey quadrangle of Dalton. The creek's watershed is the southernmost part of the Tunkhannock Creek drainage basin. Municipalities in the creek's watershed include La Plume Township, North Abington Township, Dalton, Waverly Township, South Abington Township, Scott Township, Glenburn Township, West Abington Township, Clarks Summit, and Clarks Green.

At the border between Dalton and La Plume Township, Ackerly Creek drains an area of 14.80 square miles (38.3 km^{2}). At the border between Glenburn Pond and Dalton, the creek drains an area of 10.30 square miles (26.7 km^{2}). Above Glenburn Pond, its watershed has an area of 6.39 square miles (16.6 km^{2}).

The highest population density and levels of development in the watershed of Tunkhannock Creek are found in the watershed of Ackerly Creek. While the area was once rural, it is now becoming more suburban, with residential land use being common. However, both rural and heavily developed land occur in the creek's watershed. A former Superfund site, known as Precision Plating is in the watershed. The physical condition of the creek's watershed has been described as "fair, bordering on good".

There is a swamp at the headwaters of Ackerly Creek.

== History and recreation ==
Ackerly Creek was entered into the Geographic Names Information System on August 2, 1979. Its identifier in the Geographic Names Information System is 1168043.

The area in the vicinity of Ackerly Creek was historically a haven for escaped slaves. There are several historic sites in the creek's watershed, including the Abington Baptist Church, the Madison Academy, the Waverly Community House, Keystone College, the Northern Electric Street Railway Line, and the Ackerly Fairgrounds. The Delaware, Lackawanna and Western Railroad historically passed through the valley of the creek.

A bridge known as the Ackerly Creek Bridge was built in 1904 over Ackerly Creek. The bridge was listed in the Historic American Engineering Record. A concrete box beam or girders bridge carrying State Route 4010 over Ackerly Creek was built in 2006 and is 47.9 feet (14.6 m) long. A concrete arch bridge carrying Maple Street over the creek in Dalton was built in 2008 and is 24.0 feet (7.3 m) long. A triple-barrel culvert carries the creek under US Route 6.

Between 1972 and 1993, a company had a National Pollutant Discharge Elimination System permit to discharge industrial waste in a swamp at the headwaters of Ackerly Creek.

The Land and Water Committee of the Countryside Conservancy began a formal study of the watershed of Ackerly Creek in 1999. In 2007, the Glenburn Pond Dam on the creek was slated for removal. Such a project would take several years and would restore 20 acres (8.1 ha) of wetlands and riparian buffers. Keystone College once received a $31,430 Growing Greener grant for riparian buffer restoration on the creek.

== Biology ==
The main stem of Ackerly Creek is designated as a Trout Stocked Fishery and a Migratory Fishery. However, its unnamed tributaries are designated as Coldwater Fisheries and Migratory Fisheries. As of the 1990s, there is a small trout population in the creek. A total of fourteen salamander species, thirteen snake species, ten species of frogs and toads, and four turtle species.

In Rabbit Hollow, through which Ackerly Creek flows, there are numerous bird species, including Louisiana waterthrush, Cooper's hawk, wood thrush, swamp sparrow, pileated woodpecker, belted kingfisher, red-winged blackbird, and gray catbird. Mammals in the hollow include rabbits, woodchucks, chipmunks, squirrels, and white-tailed deer.

In some reaches, the riparian buffer of Ackerly Creek is less than 30 feet (9.1 m) thick on one side, while in other reaches, it is more than 100 feet (30 m) thick on one side. Invasive species line Ackerly Creek for much of its length. Numerous plant species, including trees, shrubs, and wildflowers, inhabit various parts of Rabbit Hollow.

== Recreation ==
Numerous recreational sites, both private and public, exist within the watershed of Ackerly Creek. Major recreational sites in the watershed include the Ackerly Playing Fields, the 16-acre (6.5 ha) Rabbit Hollow Sanctuary for passive recreation and nature observing, the Dalton Streamside Park, the private Glen Oaks Country Club, and Glenburn Pond. The Rabbit Hollow preserve was donated to the Pennsylvania Chapter of The Nature Conservancy in 1975 and was designated as a preserve in 1977, and came to be owned by Abington Township.

A walking trail known as The Trolley Trail is also in the watershed of Ackerly Creek, on the former Northern Electric Trolley Line.

== See also ==
- Trout Brook (South Branch Tunkhannock Creek), next tributary of South Branch Tunkhannock Creek going downstream
- Kennedy Creek, next tributary of South Branch Tunkhannock Creek going upstream
- List of rivers of Pennsylvania
