= Pennsylvania Route 438 =

State highway in Lackawanna County, Pennsylvania, US

Pennsylvania Route 438

Route information
- Maintained by PennDOT
- Length: 10.316 mi (16.602 km)
- Existed: April 1961–present

Major junctions
- West end: US 6 / US 11 near Dalton
- PA 407 in Lackawanna State Park; I-81 in Scott Township
- East end: PA 247 in Scott Township

Location
- Country: United States
- State: Pennsylvania
- Counties: Lackawanna

Highway system
- Pennsylvania State Route System; Interstate; US; State; Scenic; Legislative
| ← PA 437 | → PA 439 |

Pennsylvania Route 438 (PA 438) is a 10.1-mile-long (16.3 km) state highway located in Lackawanna County, Pennsylvania. The western terminus is at U.S. Route 6 (US 6)/US 11 to the north of Dalton in LaPlume. The eastern terminus is at PA 247 in the Scott Township community of Montdale. PA 438 is a two-lane undivided road that passes through rural land in the northern part of Lackawanna County. The route intersects PA 407 in Wallsville and Interstate 81 (I-81) and PA 524 in Scott Township. The eastern portion of the route was designated as part of PA 247 in 1928, which was paved by 1930s. The western portion of the route was paved in the 1930s. PA 247 was shifted to the east in the 1940s, leaving the former alignment unnumbered. PA 438 was designated in April 1961 as part of construction of I-81 through northeastern Pennsylvania so that the latter road would interchange with numbered routes through Lackawanna County.

== Route description ==
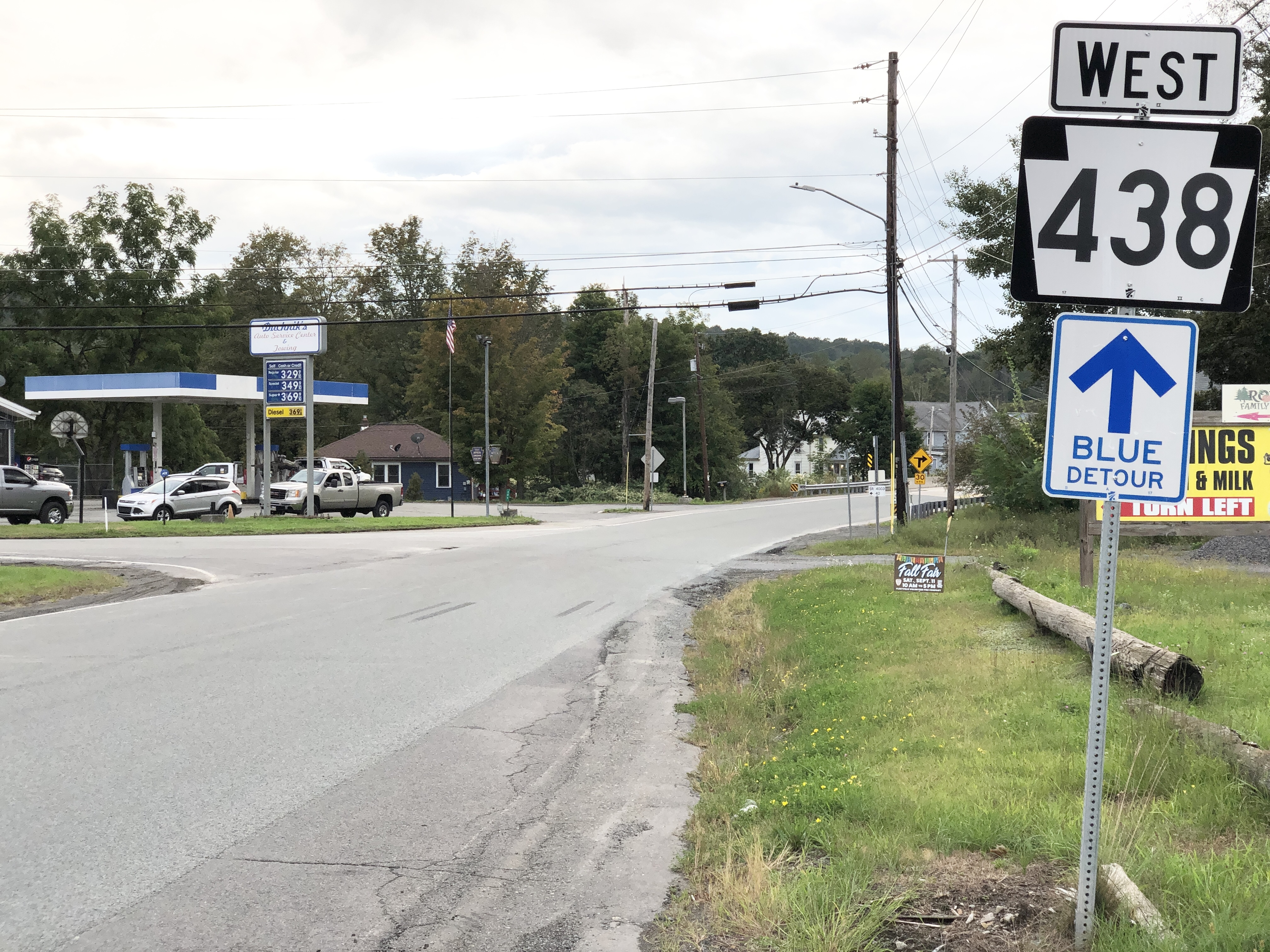
PA 438 westbound past I-81 in Scott Township

PA 438 begins at an intersection with US 6/US 11 in the community of LaPlume in La Plume Township, heading northeast on two-lane undivided East Laplume Road. The road heads through areas of fields with some homes, crossing Norfolk Southern's Sunbury Line and entering North Abington Township. The route heads into woodland and crosses the South Branch Tunkhannock Creek into Benton Township. Here, PA 438 turns east before curving to the north and back to the east as it heads through woodland with some fields and homes. The road heads into Lackawanna State Park and intersects PA 407 in the community of Wallsville. The route becomes Montdale Road and continues east through more of the park, passing to the north of Lake Lackawanna. PA 438 leaves Lackawanna State Park and heads through more rural areas, passing through East Benton. The road enters Scott Township, where it passes through Jordan Hollow and comes to an interchange with I-81. Past this, the route runs southeast through forests with some small fields and homes, intersecting the eastern terminus of PA 524 in Scott. PA 438 continues through rural areas, coming to its eastern terminus at PA 247 in Montdale.

== History ==
When Pennsylvania first legislated routes in 1911, the current routing of PA 438 was not given a number. In 1928, the section of the present route east of Jordan Hollow Road was designated as part of PA 247; this section of road was unpaved. By 1930, this section of PA 247 was paved. The unnumbered road between LaPlume and Jordan Hollow Road was paved in the 1930s. PA 247 was realigned to the east in the 1940s, leaving the section of road between Jordan Hollow Road and Montdale unnumbered. PA 438 was designated in April 1961 as part of a mass change by the state to number local roads to interchange with I-81 (the Penn-Can Highway) so that it would interchange with state highways. When designated, PA 438 ran from US 6/US 11 in LaPlume east to PA 247 in Montdale.

== Major intersections ==
The entire route is in Lackawanna County.

| Location | mi | km | Destinations | Notes |
|---|---|---|---|---|
| La Plume Township | 0.000 | 0.000 | US 6 / US 11 (Lackawanna Trail Highway) – Factoryville, Dalton | Western terminus |
| Benton Township | 2.927 | 4.711 | PA 407 (North Abington Road) | |
| Scott Township | 6.175– 6.226 | 9.938– 10.020 | I-81 – Scranton, Binghamton | Exit 201 (I-81) |
| Scott Township | 7.539 | 12.133 | PA 524 west (Scott Hill Road) | |
| Scott Township | 10.316 | 16.602 | PA 247 (Lakeland Drive) | Eastern terminus |
1.000 mi = 1.609 km; 1.000 km = 0.621 mi
