= Kennedy Creek (Pennsylvania) =

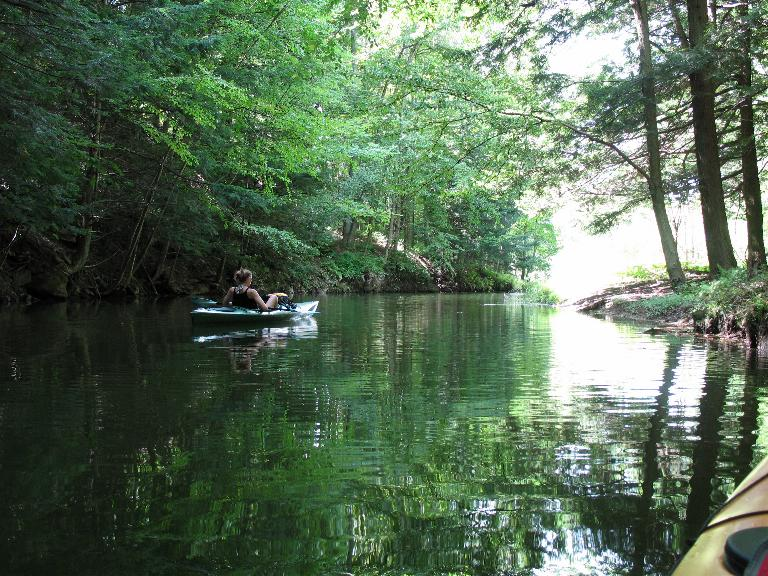
- Kayakers on Kennedy Creek in Lackawanna State Park

Physical characteristics
- Source
  - location: Small wetland in Scott Township, Lackawanna County, Pennsylvania
  - elevation: Between 1,460 and 1,480 feet (445 and 451 m)
- Mouth
  - location: Lackawanna Lake on South Branch Tunkhannock Creek in North Abington Township, Lackawanna County, Pennsylvania, at Carpenter Town
  - coordinates: 41°34′00″N 75°42′17″W
  - elevation: 984 ft (300 m)
- Length: 5.3 mi (8.5 km)
- Basin size: 6.17 sq mi (16.0 km^{2})

Basin features
- Progression: South Branch Tunkhannock Creek → Tunkhannock Creek → Susquehanna River → Chesapeake Bay
- Tributaries
  - left: Two unnamed tributaries
  - right: Three unnamed tributaries

Kennedy Creek is a tributary of South Branch Tunkhannock Creek in Lackawanna County, Pennsylvania, in the United States. It is approximately 5.3 miles (8.5 km) long and flows through Scott Township and North Abington Township. The watershed of the creek has an area of 6.17 square miles (16.0 km^{2}). The creek is not designated as an impaired waterbody. The surficial geology in its vicinity consists of Wisconsinan Till, alluvium, bedrock, and fill.

A number of bridges have been constructed over Kennedy Creek. The watershed of the creek is designated as a Coldwater Fishery and a Migratory Fishery. The creek flows through Lackawanna State Park in its lower reaches. It is crossed by two trails in the park and is utilized for canoeing.

== Course ==
Kennedy Creek begins in a small wetland in Scott Township. It flows north for a few tenths of a mile alongside Pennsylvania Route 347 before crossing Pennsylvania Route 632 and turning north-northwest. After a few tenths of a mile, it receives an unnamed tributary from the left and turns north-northeast, flowing close to Newton Hill and Weatherby Hill. After several tenths of a mile, the creek turns north-northwest and then west, crossing Interstate 81. The creek then turns north for a short distance before turning northwest, crossing Pennsylvania Route 524 and entering North Abington Township. Here, it turns southwest, crossing Pennsylvania Route 524 again, before turning northwest for a few tenths of a mile and receiving one unnamed tributary from the left and one from the right.

Kennedy Creek then turns west-northwest for a few miles, flowing through a valley alongside Pennsylvania Route 524. In this reach, the creek passes by Sarnoski Hill and receives two unnamed tributaries from the right. It then turns west for several tenths of a mile, passing by Turkey Hill and receiving another unnamed tributary from the right. The creek then turns northwest for a few tenths of a mile, crossing Pennsylvania Route 524 and heading away from it. It then turns west and enters Lackawanna Lake, where it reaches its confluence with South Branch Tunkhannock Creek.

Kennedy Creek joins South Branch Tunkhannock Creek 12.82 miles (20.63 km) upstream of its mouth.

== Hydrology ==
Kennedy Creek is not designated as an impaired waterbody.

In June 2006, trace concentrations of trichloroethylene were found in Kennedy Creek at the Interstate 81 overpass. However, in September 2006, the creek was found not to contain trichloroethylene, perchloroethylene, or DCE.

== Geography and geology ==
The elevation near the mouth of Kennedy Creek is 984 feet (300 m) above sea level. The elevation of the creek's source is between 1,460 and 1,480 feet (445 and 451 m) above sea level.

The mouth of Kennedy Creek is located at the Kennedy Creek Inlet. An "exceptionally scenic" ravine with hemlock trees occurs at this inlet.

The surficial geology along much of Kennedy Creek consists of alluvium. However, the surficial geology in the creek's valley as a whole consists mostly of a till known as Wisconsinan Till. There is also a patch of bedrock consisting of sandstone and shale at the creek's mouth and a patch of fill where the creek crosses Interstate 81.

== Watershed ==
The watershed of Kennedy Creek has an area of 6.17 square miles (16.0 km^{2}). The creek is entirely within the United States Geological Survey quadrangle of Dalton. The mouth of the creek is located at Carpenter Town.

The designated use for Kennedy Creek is aquatic life. The creek is one of several major streams to drain Scott Township.

== History ==
Kennedy Creek was entered into the Geographic Names Information System on August 2, 1979. Its identifier in the Geographic Names Information System is 1178368.

A steel stringer/multi-beam or girder bridge carrying Pennsylvania Route 347 over Kennedy Creek was built in 1938 and repaired in 1955. It is 21.0 feet (6.4 m) long and is located in Scott Township. Two bridges of the same type, but carrying Pennsylvania Route 524, were built over the creek in 1939 in North Abington Township and are 33.1 and 24.0 feet (10.1 and 7.3 m) long. The first of these two bridges was repaired in 1955. A concrete slab bridge carrying State Route 4007/Craig Road across the creek was built in 1962 in North Abington Township and is 24.0 feet (7.3 m) long. A prestressed box beam or girders bridge carrying Pennsylvania Route 524 was constructed across the creek in 1986 in North Abington Township and is 22.0 feet (6.7 m) long.

In 2015, members of the "watershed team" of Riverside High School participated in chemical and biological tests on Kennedy Creek.

== Biology ==
The drainage basin of Kennedy Creek is designated as a Coldwater Fishery and a Migratory Fishery. Wild trout naturally reproduce in the creek from its headwaters downstream to its mouth.

== Recreation ==
Kennedy Creek flows through Lackawanna State Park in its lower reaches. In this reach, hunting is permitted on the creek's right side, but not on most of its left side. Two multi-use trails in the park cross the creek. Paddling opportunities in Lackawanna State Park include the Kennedy Creek Inlet. The creek itself has been described as "a favorite of canoeists".

The Countryside Conservancy has an easement called the Hull Easement, which includes some land in the bottomlands along Kennedy Creek, upstream of Lackawanna State Park. This tract has an area of 124 acres (50 ha).

== See also ==
- Ackerly Creek, next tributary of South Branch Tunkhannock Creek going downstream
- List of rivers of Pennsylvania
