= Lackawanna State Park =

State park in Pennsylvania, United States

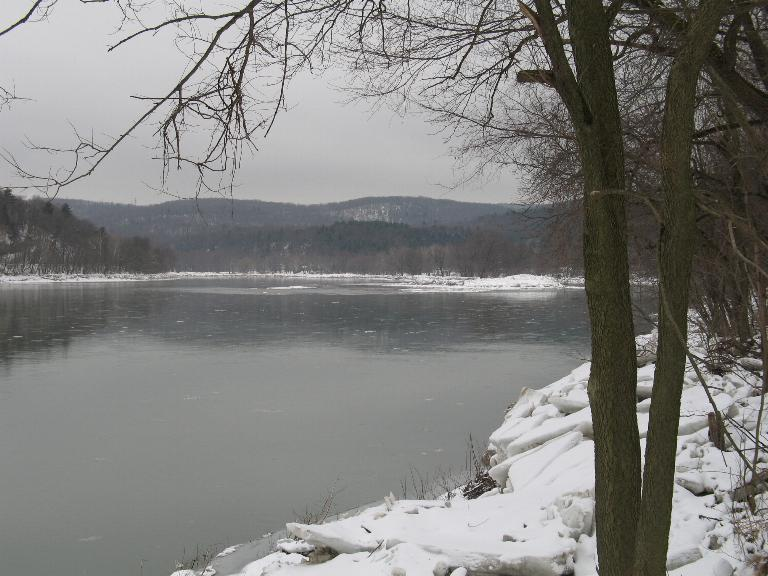
- Lake Lackawanna

- Location within Pennsylvania Location within the United States
- Interactive map of Lackawanna State Park
- Location: Lackawanna County, Pennsylvania, United States
- Coordinates: 41°33′32″N 75°42′20″W
- Area: 198 acres (80 ha)
- Elevation: 1,135 feet (346 m)
- Established: 1972
- Administrator: Pennsylvania Department of Conservation and Natural Resources
- Website: Official website
- Pennsylvania State Parks

Lackawanna State Park is a 1,445-acre (585 ha) Pennsylvania state park in Benton and North Abington townships, Lackawanna County, Pennsylvania in the United States. Lake Lackawanna, a 198-acre (80 ha) man-made lake, is the central focus of recreation at the park. Lackawanna State Park is located near Dalton on Pennsylvania Route 524 just off exit 199 of Interstate 81.

On June 1, 2023, the contractor for the park filed for Chapter 11 bankruptcy protection.

== History ==
=== Indian Path ===
Lackawanna State Park is named for the nearby valley of the Lackawanna River. The word comes from the Lenape "le-can-hanna", meaning "stream that forks". This native tribe occupied the area for many years using a trail that led north to the territories of present-day New York state. The first white settlers in the area used this same path as well and gradually built homes and farms along this route.

=== Racecourse, railroads, and farms ===
The farmers of the Lackawanna Valley organized a fair in 1898. This fair, named the Maitland Fair and Driving Park Association, was held for at least twelve years. A horse racing course was built on the fairgrounds on what is currently the park campgrounds. Ownership of the land next fell into the hands of a small railroad that felt it was being overcharged for water by the Scranton Gas and Water Company. The railroad had intended to build a reservoir to meet its needs for water. The plans for the building of the reservoir were dropped when the railroad and water company reached an agreement over the price of water. Next the land was rented to farmers by the railroad and later by Robert Moffat, a prominent Scranton coal baron. The Commonwealth of Pennsylvania purchased the land in 1968. The state built Lake Lackawanna and opened the park to the public on June 10, 1972.

== Recreation ==
=== Lake Lackawanna ===
Lake Lackawanna is a 198-acre (80 ha) man-made lake. The lake is 2.5 miles (4.0 km) long. It has 7.5 miles (12.1 km) of shoreline. The lake was created by the Commonwealth by damming South Branch Tunkhannock Creek and its tributary Kennedy Creek. The lake is open to boating and fishing. Sailboats, canoes, and row boats are common sights on the lake. Gas-powered boats are not permitted on the lake, but boats powered by electric motors may be taken on the waters of Lake Lackawanna. Lake Lackawanna has cold and warm water fisheries. The lake and creek are stocked with largemouth bass, trout, pickerel, channel catfish, bullhead, and muskellunge. The lake is open to ice fishing and ice skating during the winter months.

=== Hunting and trails ===
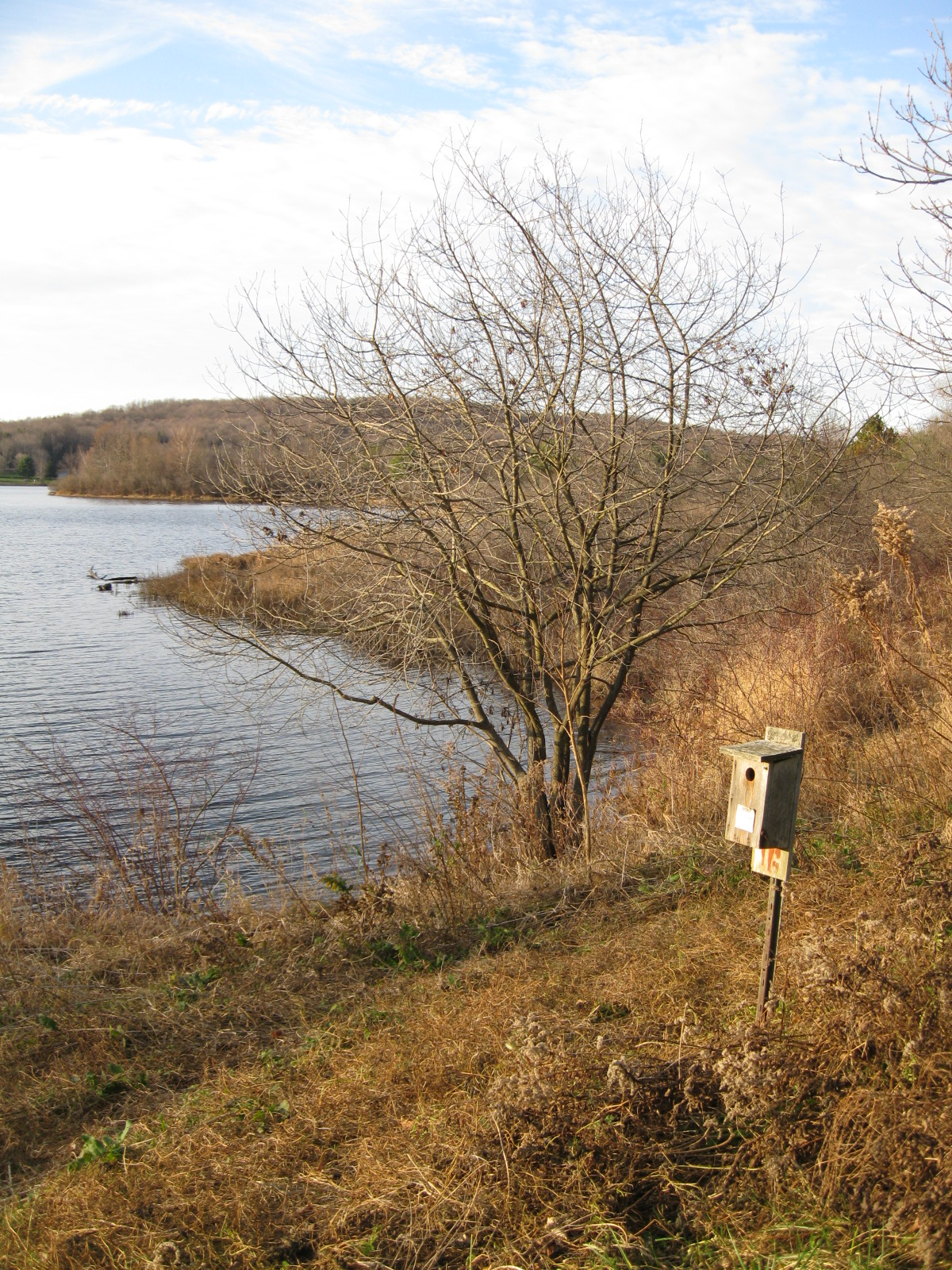
A bluebird box

Hunting is permitted on about 500 acres (200 ha) of Lackawanna State Park. Hunters must follow the rules and regulations of the Pennsylvania Game Commission. The common game species are ruffed grouse, squirrels, turkey, white-tailed deer, and rabbits. The hunting of groundhogs is prohibited. Hunters, hikers, horseback riders, and mountain bike riders share 15 miles (24 km) of multiuse trails at Lackawanna State Park. Trailheads are at the States Creek Mooring Area and on Rowlands, Wallsville and Austin roads. There are an additional 3 miles (4.8 km) of hiking-only trails. The trails loop through the park passing by the lake, through forests and fields, and by woodland streams.

=== Camping, picnicking and swimming ===
The 61-site campground at Lackawanna State Park is open to tents and RVs. It is within walking distance of Lake Lackawanna. The campsites have electric hook-ups and there is a modern washhouse with restrooms and showers with hot water. There are three large areas for group tenting at Lackawanna State Park. This camping area has a modern wash houses as well as several fire rings and picnic tables. The picnic area is by the lake near the swimming pool. The pool is open Memorial Day weekend until Labor Day weekend from 11:00 am until 7:00 pm.
