= Gilbert Stephen Bailey =

American Baptist clergyman

- photo by Mathew Brady Studio thought to be of Bailey
- Born: October 17, 1822; Dalton
- Died: September 28, 1891 (aged 68); Pomona

Gilbert Stephen Bailey (October 17, 1822 – September 28, 1891) was an American Baptist clergyman.

Gilbert Stephen Bailey was born on October 17, 1822 in Dalton, Pennsylvania.

He was educated at Oberlin College, and, after studying theology, became a Baptist clergyman, holding pastorates in various places in New York and Illinois until 1863, when he was made superintendent of the Baptist missions in Illinois, and from 1867 to 1875 was secretary of the Baptist Theological Union in Chicago. The system of "minister's institutes," now prevalent in the Baptist denomination, was originated by him in 1864, and they were subsequently conducted by him in Chicago, Upper Alton, and Bloomingdale, Ill. He resumed his preaching and had charge of churches in Pennsylvania, Michigan, and Iowa, was a secretary of the Italian Bible and Sunday School Mission in 1880 and 1881 and missionary in southern California in 1885 and 1886. Besides numerous tracts and uncollected poems, he has published a History of the Illinois River Baptist Association (New York, 1857); Caverns of Kentucky (Chicago, 1863); Manual of Baptism (Philadelphia, 1863); The Trials and Victories of Religious Liberty in America (1876); Three Discourses on the History, Wonders, and Excellence of the Bible (Ottumwa, 1882); The Word and Works of God (Philadelphia, 1883); Prize Discourse on Slander (Washington, 1884); and Ingersollism Exposed (Ottumwa, 1884).

Gilbert Stephen Bailey died on 28 September 1891 in Pomona, California.
