= Benton Township, Pennsylvania =

Benton Township is the name of some places in the U.S. state of Pennsylvania:

- Benton Township, Columbia County, Pennsylvania
- Benton Township, Lackawanna County, Pennsylvania
