= Pennsylvania Route 524 =

State highway in Lackawanna County, Pennsylvania, US

Pennsylvania Route 524

Route information
- Maintained by PennDOT
- Length: 4.733 mi (7.617 km)
- Existed: April 1961–present

Major junctions
- West end: PA 407 in Lackawanna State Park
- I-81 in Scott Township; PA 347 in Scott Township
- East end: PA 438 in Scott Township

Location
- Country: United States
- State: Pennsylvania
- Counties: Lackawanna

Highway system
- Pennsylvania State Route System; Interstate; US; State; Scenic; Legislative
← PA 523	→ PA 527

Pennsylvania Route 524 (PA 524) is a 4.73-mile-long (7.61 km) state highway located in Lackawanna County, Pennsylvania. The western terminus is at PA 407 in Lackawanna State Park. The eastern terminus is at PA 438 in Scott Township. The route is a two-lane undivided road that runs through rural areas in northern Lackawanna County. Along the way, PA 524 has an interchange with Interstate 81 (I-81) and an intersection with the northern terminus of PA 347. The western portion of the route was designated as the northernmost section of PA 347 by 1930. The entire road was paved during the 1930s. PA 524 was designated in April 1961 as part of the construction of I-81 so that the latter would interchange with numbered state highways, replacing the northernmost portion of PA 347.

== Route description ==
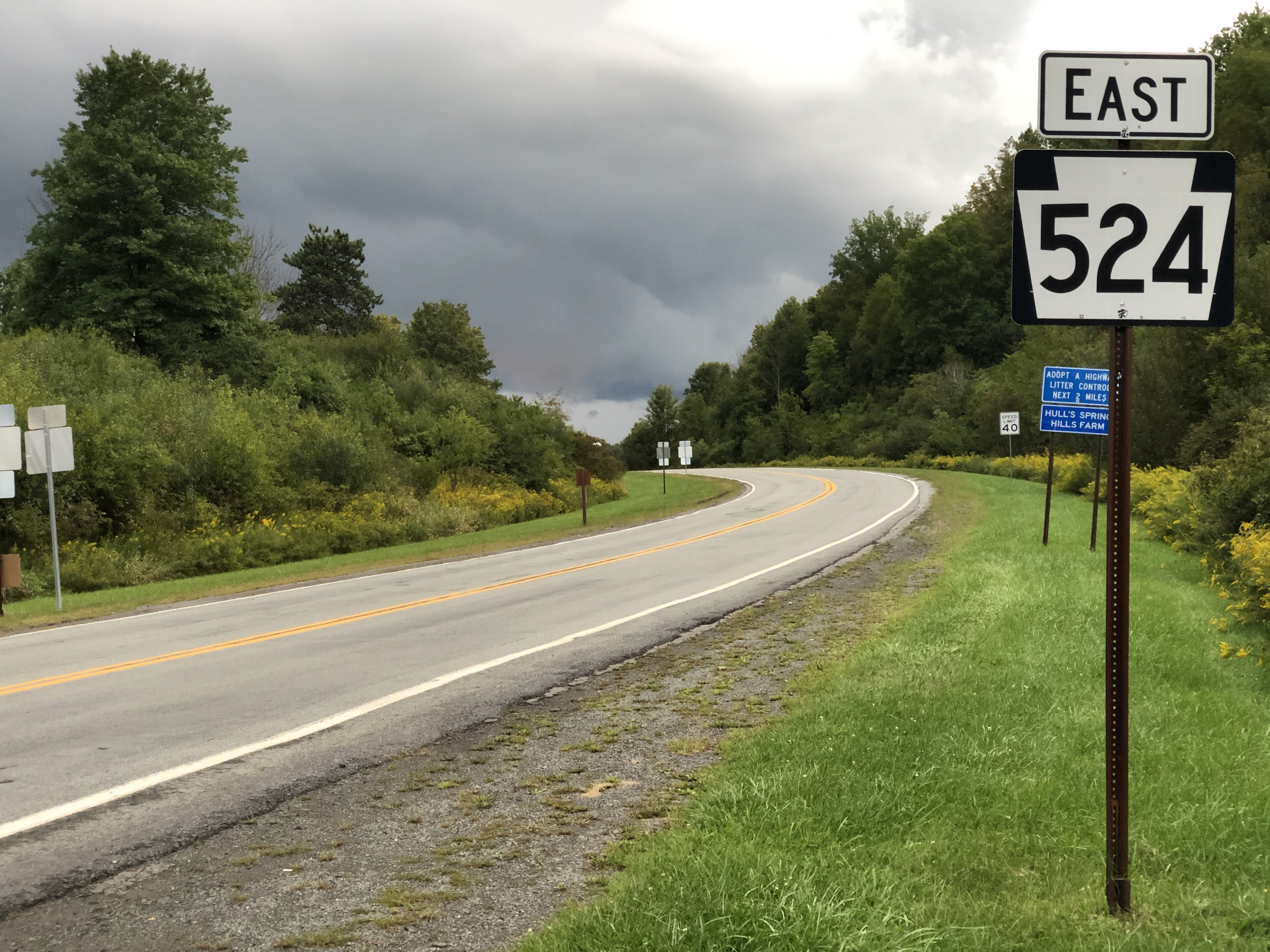
PA 524 eastbound at PA 407 in Carpenter Town

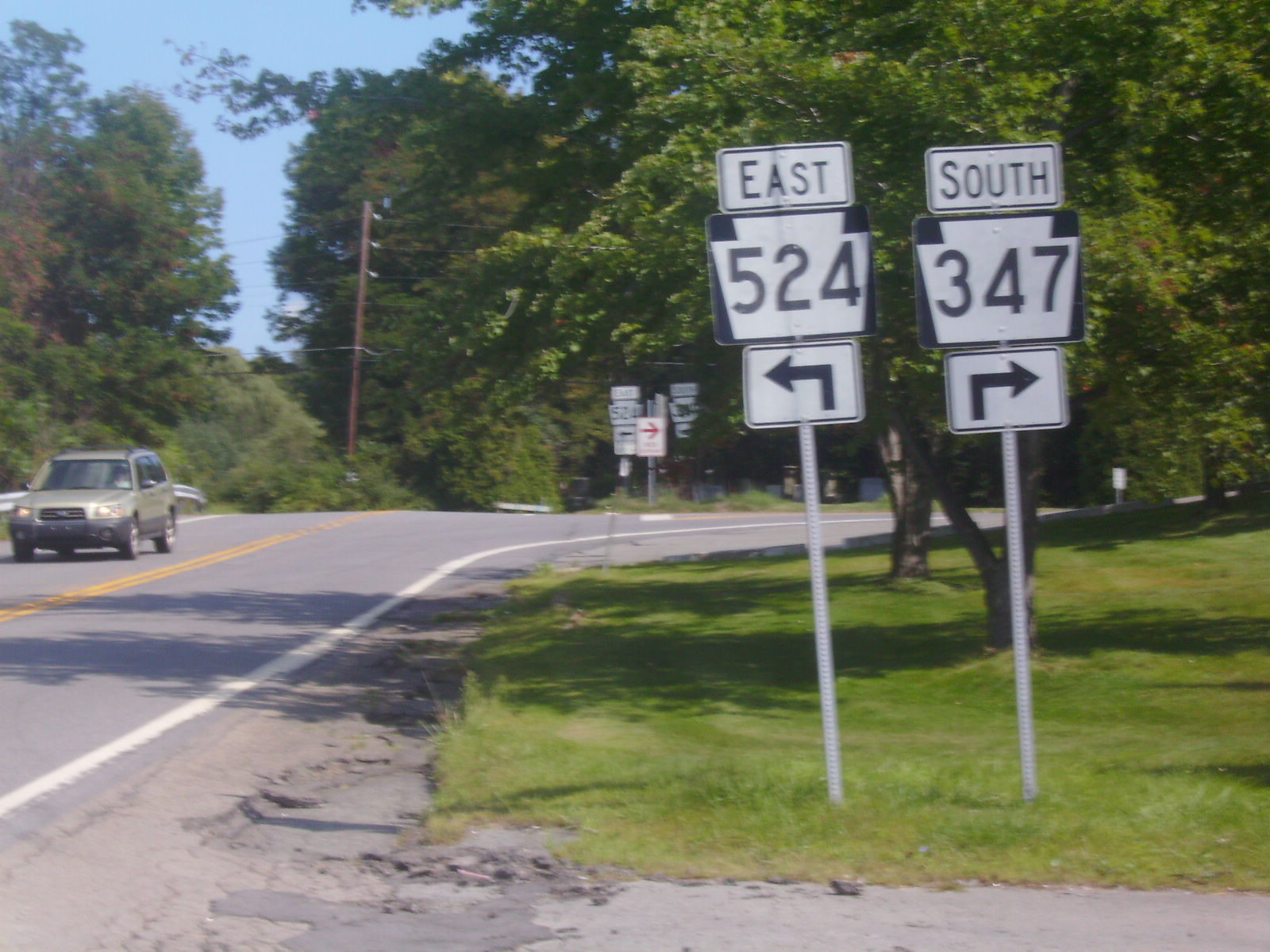
PA 524 approaching the intersection with PA 347 in Scott Township

PA 524 begins at an intersection with PA 407 (North Abington Road) in the Carpenter Town area of North Abington Township. This intersection is within the boundaries of Lackawanna State Park. PA 524 heads to the northeast, paralleling PA 407 as Kennedy Creek Road through the park until the intersection with Rowland Road, where PA 524 heads eastward. A short distance after Rowlands Road, the highway leaves Lackawanna State Park. PA 524 winds through residences and fields south of East Benton, soon entering the hamlet of Craig. In Craig, there are a couple residences south of where State Route 4003 (SR 4003, Manning Road) terminates and SR 4007 (Craig Road) begins. At Craig Road, PA 524 turns eastward out of Craig, crosses an intersection with Stone Road, and enters Scott Township. Just beyond the township line, the road reaches Exit 199 of I-81. Crossing under I-81, the highway heads uphill and intersects with PA 347 (Justus Boulevard), which terminates. PA 524 turns onto the right-of-way for PA 347 and heads northward paralleling I-81 through Scott Township. Passing several residences, PA 524 terminates at an intersection with PA 438 (Montdale Road) in the community of Scott.

== History ==
When Pennsylvania legislated routes in 1911, the current alignment of PA 524 was not given a number. By 1930, the portion of the road between PA 407 and the present northern terminus of PA 347 was designated as the northernmost part of PA 347, which was unpaved. This section of PA 347 was paved in the 1930s. In addition, the section of the present route east of PA 347 was also paved. PA 524 was created in April 1961 as part of several changes in northeastern Pennsylvania that included renumbering numerous highways and the creation of several state highways. PA 524 was designated as part of making sure that I-81 (the Penn-Can Highway) interchanged with state highways. The western section of the route replaced the northernmost portion of PA 347. When designated, PA 524 ran from PA 407 in Lackawanna State Park east to PA 438 in Scott.

== Major intersections ==
The entire route is in Lackawanna County.

Location	mi	km	Destinations	Notes
North Abington Township	0.000	0.000	PA 407 (North Abington Road)	Western terminus; village of Carpenter Town
Scott Township	3.159– 3.176	5.084– 5.111	I-81 – Scranton, Binghamton	Exit 199 (I-81)
Scott Township	3.329	5.358	PA 347 south (Justus Boulevard)	Northern terminus of PA 347
Scott Township	4.733	7.617	PA 438 (Montdale Road)	Eastern terminus
1.000 mi = 1.609 km; 1.000 km = 0.621 mi

== PA 524 Truck ==
Pennsylvania Route 524 Truck
- Location: Lackawanna County, Pennsylvania
- Existed: 2013–present

Pennsylvania Route 524 Truck is a truck route around a weight-restricted beige over the Kennedy Creek in North Abington Township, Pennsylvania. It runs concurrent with PA 438 and I-81. It was signed in 2013.
