= West Abington Township, Pennsylvania =

Township in Pennsylvania, US

West Abington Township
- Township
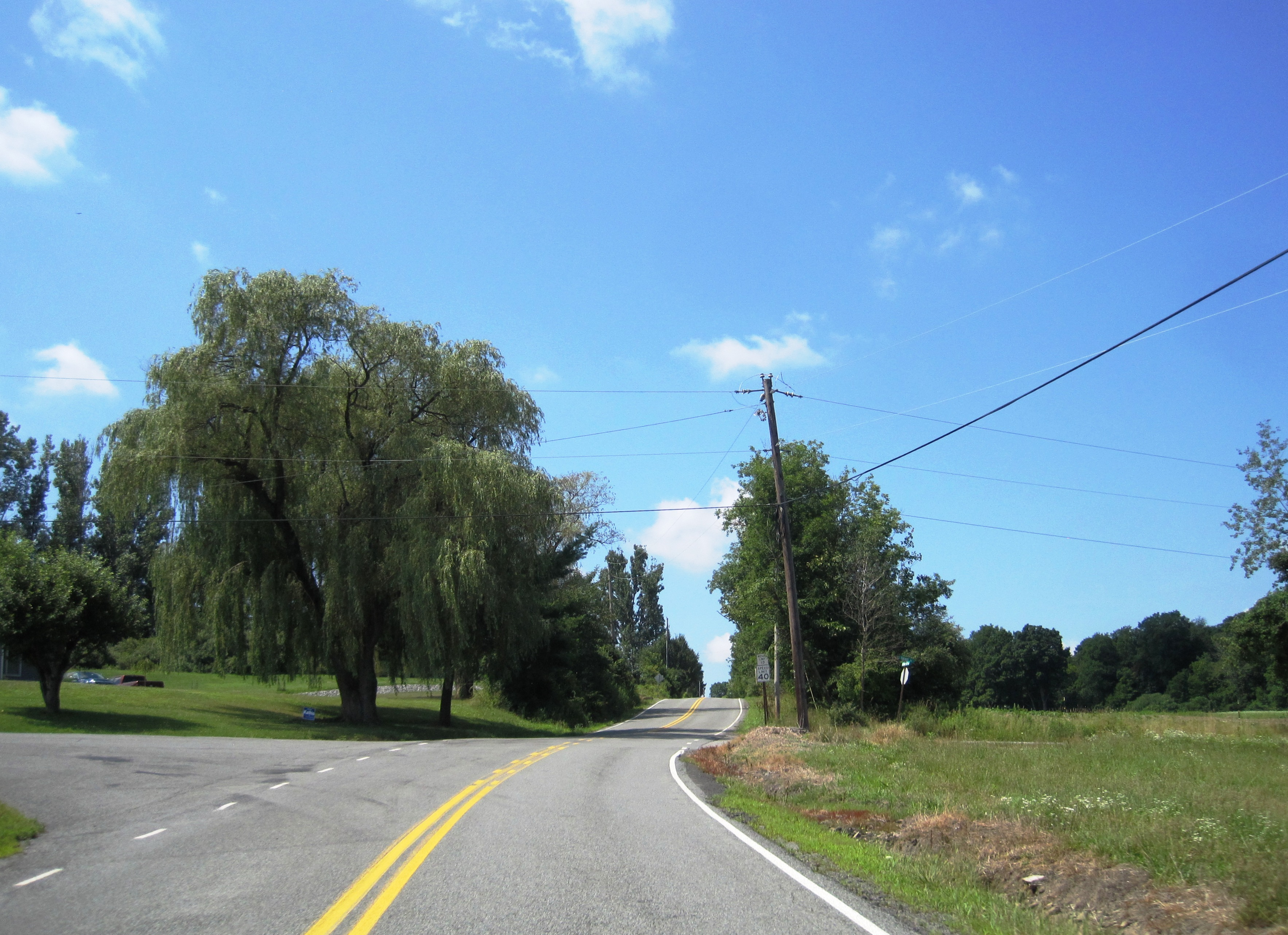
- Wilbur Hill Road in West Abington Township

- Location of Pennsylvania in the United States
- Coordinates: 41°31′00″N 75°45′59″W
- Country: United States
- State: Pennsylvania
- County: Lackawanna

Area
  - Total: 5.56 sq mi (14.41 km^{2})
  - Land: 5.55 sq mi (14.37 km^{2})
  - Water: 0.015 sq mi (0.04 km^{2})
- Elevation: 1,191 ft (363 m)

Population (2020)
  - Total: 300 ▲
  - Estimate (2021): 299
  - Density: 45.0/sq mi (17.39/km^{2})
- Time zone: UTC-5 (EST)
  - Summer (DST): UTC-4 (EDT)
- Area code: 570
- FIPS code: 42-069-82360

West Abington Township, is a township in Lackawanna County, Pennsylvania, United States. The population was 300 at the 2020 census.

== Geography ==
According to the United States Census Bureau, the township has a total area of 5.5 square miles (14.1 km^{2}), of which 5.4 square miles (14.1 km^{2}) is land and 0.04 square mile (0.1 km^{2}) (0.37%) is water.

== Demographics ==
Historical population
Census	Pop.	Note	%±
2010	250		—
2020	300		20.0%
2021 (est.)	299		−0.3%
U.S. Decennial Census

As of the census of 2010, there were 250 people, 112 households, and 76 families residing in the township. The population density was 46.3 inhabitants per square mile (17.9/km^{2}). There were 114 housing units at an average density of 21.1/sq mi (8.24/km^{2}). The racial makeup of the township was 99.2% White and 0.8% two or more races.

There were 112 households, out of which 17% had children under the age of 18 living with them, 53.6% were married couples living together, 6.3% had a female householder with no husband present, and 32.1% were non-families. 25% of all households were made up of individuals, and 8.9% had someone living alone who was 65 years of age or older. The average household size was 2.23 and the average family size was 2.67.

In the township the population was spread out, with 15.2% under the age of 18, 71.6% from 18 to 64, and 13.2% who were 65 years of age or older. The median age was 49.2 years.

The median income for a household in the township was $46,875, and the median income for a family was $57,250. Males had a median income of $41,250 versus $31,667 for females. The per capita income for the township was $28,089. About 7.2% of families and 9.2% of the population were below the poverty line, including 24.2% of those under age 18 and none of those age 65 or over.
