= La Plume Township, Pennsylvania =

Township in Pennsylvania, US

- Township
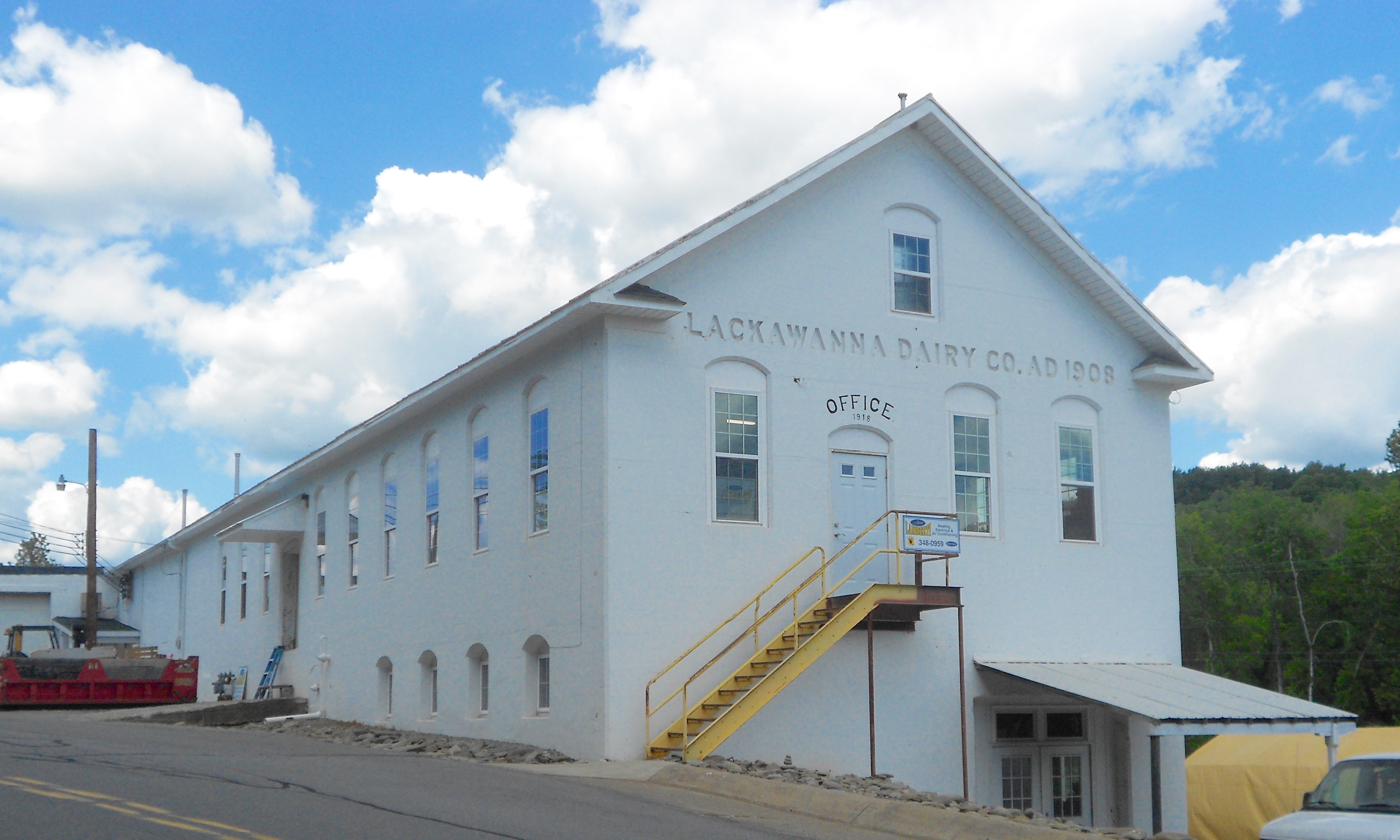
- Lackawanna Dairy building

- Location of Pennsylvania in the United States
- Coordinates: 41°33′30″N 75°45′29″W
- Country: United States
- State: Pennsylvania

Area
  - Total: 2.44 sq mi (6.31 km^{2})
  - Land: 2.43 sq mi (6.30 km^{2})
  - Water: 0.0039 sq mi (0.01 km^{2})
- Elevation: 879 ft (268 m)

Population (2020)
  - Total: 486 ▼
  - Estimate (2021): 483
  - Density: 235.0/sq mi (90.73/km^{2})
- Time zone: UTC-5 (EST)
  - Summer (DST): UTC-4 (EDT)
- Area code: 570
- FIPS code: 42-069-41504
- Website: https://www.laplumetownship.com/

La Plume Township is a township in Lackawanna County, Pennsylvania, United States. The population was 486 at the 2020 census. It is home to Keystone College. La Plume is located 11 miles northwest of Scranton, one of Pennsylvania's most populated cities.

== Geography ==
According to the United States Census Bureau, the township has a total area of 2.4 square miles (6.2 km^{2}), all land.

== Demographics ==
Historical population
Census	Pop.	Note	%±
2010	602		—
2020	486		−19.3%
2021 (est.)	483		−0.6%
U.S. Decennial Census

As of the census of 2010, there were 602 people, 254 households, and 164 families residing in the township. The population density was 251.0 inhabitants per square mile (96.9/km^{2}). There were 280 housing units at an average density of 116.7 units per square mile (45.1 units/km^{2}). The racial makeup of the township was 97.2% White, 0.5% African American, 0.2% American Indian, 0.8% Asian, and 1.3% from two or more races. Hispanic or Latino of any race were 0.8% of the population.

There were 254 households, out of which 26.4% had children under the age of 18 living with them, 47.6% were married couples living together, 9.8% had a female householder with no husband present, and 35.4% were non-families. 30.3% of all households were made up of individuals, and 8.3% had someone living alone who was 65 years of age or older. The average household size was 2.37 and the average family size was 2.95.

In the township the population was spread out, with 25.6% under the age of 18, 59.4% from 18 to 64, and 15% who were 65 years of age or older. The median age was 42 years.

The median income for a household in the township was $35,859, and the median income for a family was $46,548. Males had a median income of $29,524 versus $21,250 for females. The per capita income for the township was $20,000. About 12.7% of families and 23% of the population were below the poverty line, including 61.9% of those under age 18 and 2.6% of those age 65 or over.
