= Dalton, Pennsylvania =

Borough in Pennsylvania, US

- Borough
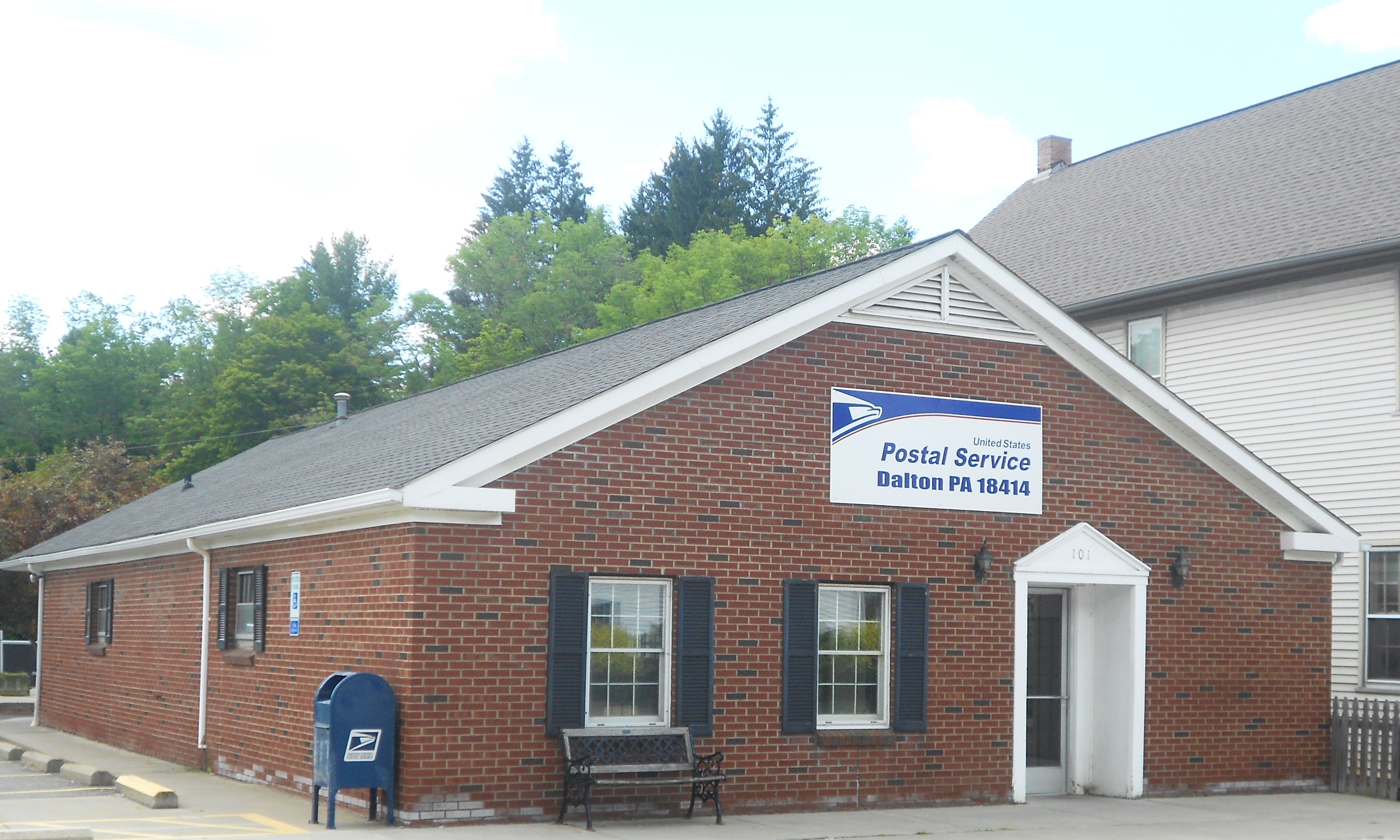
- Dalton post office

- Location of Dalton in Lackawanna County, Pennsylvania

- Location in Pennsylvania Location in the United States
- Coordinates: 41°32′08″N 75°44′06″W
- Country: United States
- State: Pennsylvania
- County: Lackawanna

Government
  - Mayor: Harrison Wolff

Area
  - Total: 3.07 sq mi (7.96 km^{2})
  - Land: 3.02 sq mi (7.82 km^{2})
  - Water: 0.054 sq mi (0.14 km^{2})
- Elevation: 991 ft (302 m)

Population (2020)
  - Total: 1,284
  - Density: 425.3/sq mi (164.19/km^{2})
- Time zone: UTC-5 (EST)
  - Summer (DST): UTC-4 (EDT)
- Zip Code: 18414
- Area code: 570
- FIPS code: 42-18088
- Website: www.daltonboroughpa.gov

Dalton is a borough in Lackawanna County, Pennsylvania, United States. It is part of Northeastern Pennsylvania and is located approximately eight miles north of the city of Scranton in a suburban area known as "the Abingtons." Dalton is also approximately three miles north of Clarks Summit, the hub of the Abington community. The population was 1,283 at the 2020 census.

== Geography ==
Dalton is located at 41°32′8″N 75°44′6″W (41.535597, -75.735090). According to the U.S. Census Bureau, the borough has a total area of 3.2 square miles (8.3 km^{2}), of which 3.1 square miles (8.0 km^{2}) is land and 0.1 square miles (0.26 km^{2}) 1.90% is water.

== Demographics ==
Historical population
Census	Pop.	Note	%±
1880	172		—
1900	681		—
1910	767		12.6%
1920	786		2.5%
1930	1,072		36.4%
1940	1,090		1.7%
1950	1,109		1.7%
1960	1,227		10.6%
1970	1,282		4.5%
1980	1,383		7.9%
1990	1,369		−1.0%
2000	1,294		−5.5%
2010	1,234		−4.6%
2020	1,284		4.1%
2021 (est.)	1,279	▼	−0.4%

At the 2000 census there were 1,234 people, 502 households, and 357 families residing in the borough. The population density was 398.1 inhabitants per square mile (153.7/km^{2}). There were 547 housing units at an average density of 176.5 units per square mile (68.1 units/km^{2}). The racial makeup of the borough was 97.6% White, 0.1% Black, 0.2% American Indian, 1.3% Asian, and 0.8% from two or more races. Hispanic or Latino of any race were 1%.

There were 502 households, 28.9% had children under the age of 18 living with them, 60.8% were married couples living together, 7.6% had a female householder with no husband present, and 28.9% were non-families. 25.1% of households were made up of individuals, and 12.4% were one person aged 65 or older. The average household size was 2.46 and the average family size was 2.96.

In the borough the population was spread out, with 21.9% under the age of 18, 61.1% from 18 to 64, and 17% 65 or older. The median age was 45.5 years.

The median household income was in the borough was $47,625. The median family income in the borough was $65,577. Males had a median income of $41,964 versus $30,583 for females. The per capita income for the borough was $25,760. About 5.0% of families and 6.9% of the population were below the poverty line, including 8.8% of those under age 18 and 7.1% of those age 65 or over.

== Notable places ==
Dalton is noted for having many business and community services centered in its downtown strip. Along Main Street in a small 0.1 mile location are located a fire station, police office, pizzeria, pub and eatery, library, pharmacy, and post office. Dalton was also the home to the Dalton House, which was part of the National Register of Historic Places. The building was torn down in the 1990s.

== Twin town ==
Dalton is twinned with:

- Dalton-in-Furness, Cumbria, England, United Kingdom

== Notable people ==
- Gilbert Stephen Bailey (1822–1891) - clergyman
