= Interstate 81 in Pennsylvania =

Section of Interstate Highway in Pennsylvania

Interstate 81
- American Legion Memorial Highway
- I-81 highlighted in red

Route information
- Maintained by PennDOT
- Length: 232.76 mi (374.59 km)
- Existed: August 14, 1957–present
- NHS: Entire route

Major junctions
- South end: I-81 at the Maryland state line in State Line
- US 30 in Chambersburg; PA 581 near Camp Hill; US 22 / US 322 in Harrisburg; I-83 / US 322 in Colonial Park; I-78 in Lickdale; I-80 near Hazleton; PA 309 in Wilkes-Barre; I-84 / I-380 / US 6 in Dunmore; I-476 Toll / Penna Turnpike NE Extension / US 6 / US 11 near Scranton
- North end: I-81 at the New York state line in Great Bend

Location
- Country: United States
- State: Pennsylvania
- Counties: Franklin, Cumberland, Dauphin, Lebanon, Schuylkill, Luzerne, Lackawanna, Susquehanna

Highway system
- Interstate Highway System; Main; Auxiliary; Suffixed; Business; Future; Pennsylvania State Route System; Interstate; US; State; Scenic; Legislative
← PA 80	→ PA 81

Interstate 81 (I-81) is a north–south Interstate Highway, stretching from I-40 in Dandridge, Tennessee, northeast to Fishers Landing, New York on Wellesley Island, at the Canada–United States border. In Pennsylvania, I-81 runs for 232.76 miles (374.59 km) from the Maryland state line northeast to the New York state line near Hallstead and is called the American Legion Memorial Highway. The Interstate enters the state near the borough of Greencastle, serving the boroughs of Chambersburg and Carlisle, before reaching Harrisburg, the capital. After that, it climbs into the Pocono Mountains to run through the Wyoming Valley, then exits into New York. It is the longest north–south Interstate in Pennsylvania.

== Route description ==
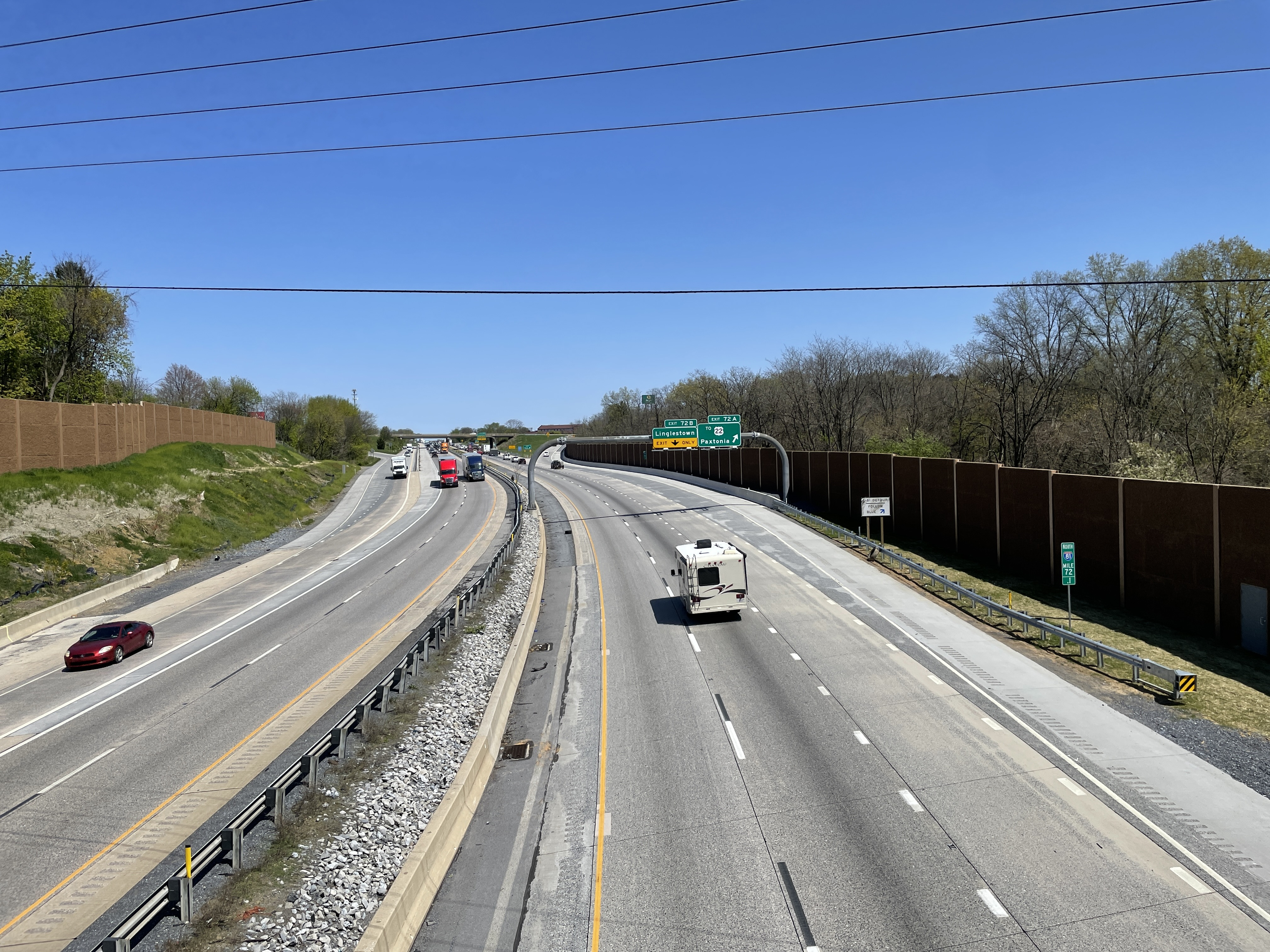
I-81 northbound in Paxtonia northeast of Harrisburg

I-81 enters Pennsylvania at the Maryland state line about 13 miles (21 km) south of Chambersburg; it also has its first exit at the state line, junctioning with Pennsylvania Route 163 (PA 163) there. In Chambersburg at exit 16, it meets U.S. Route 30 (US 30; the Chambersburg Pike to Gettysburg). About a mile (1.6 km) north of Carlisle at exit 52, it meets US 11, which connects to the Pennsylvania Turnpike/I-76 (halfway between Philadelphia and Pittsburgh), since I-81 has no direct interchange with I-76. The stretch of US 11 connecting I-81 to I-76 is known locally as the "Miracle Mile" since it contains plenty of traveler services including restaurants, gas stations, lodging, truck stops, and shops. From here, I-81 travels in an almost precisely east–west direction for the next 37 miles (60 km) (until exit 89). At exit 59, it has an interchange with the western terminus of PA 581. I-81 becomes the Capital Beltway from exit 59 to exit 70. At exit 67, the road comes to a stack interchange with US 22 and US 322; US 322 merges with I-81. Exit 70 is the eastern terminus of the US 322 concurrency and the northern terminus of I-83 and is located in Colonial Park. For the entire segment between the Mason–Dixon line and I-78, I-81 runs through the Great Valley. North of Harrisburg between I-83/US 322 and I-78, the highway passes near Hershey and Fort Indiantown Gap.

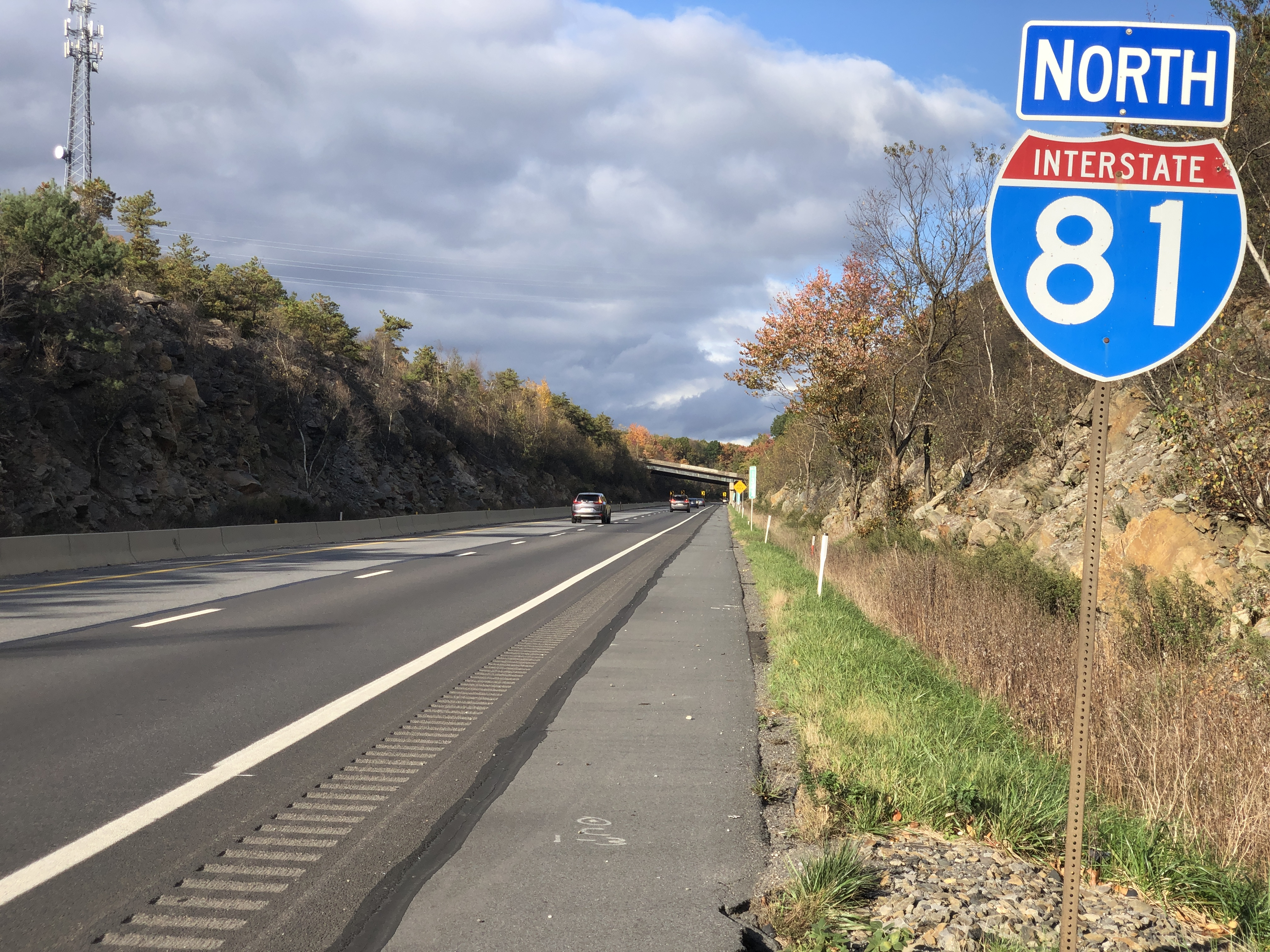
I-81 northbound north of exit 134 in Delano Township

At milemarker 89, I-81 meets the western terminus of I-78; I-78 picks up the eastward route through the Great Valley and heads toward Allentown and New York City, while I-81 turns back northward, cutting through Blue Mountain at Swatara Gap. From milemarkers 141 to 146, I-81 passes near the city of Hazleton. At exit 151, I-81 meets I-80. As motorists enter Wilkes-Barre at milemarker 165, I-81 merges with PA 309 for five miles (8.0 km). At exit 175, I-81 meets with PA 315, which connects to I-476 (Pennsylvania Turnpike Northeast Extension). In Scranton at milemarker 185, there is a short freeway called the President Biden Expressway, which heads into downtown Scranton. At milemarker 187, I-81 is at the Throop Dunmore Interchange, which consists of I-84, I-380, and US 6. US 6 merges with I-81 for seven miles (11 km) from milemarkers 187 to 194. At milemarker 194 is the northern terminus of I-476. The last exit in Pennsylvania is exit 230, which is PA 171 near Hallstead. I-81 reaches the New York state line four miles (6.4 km) north of exit 230.

== History ==
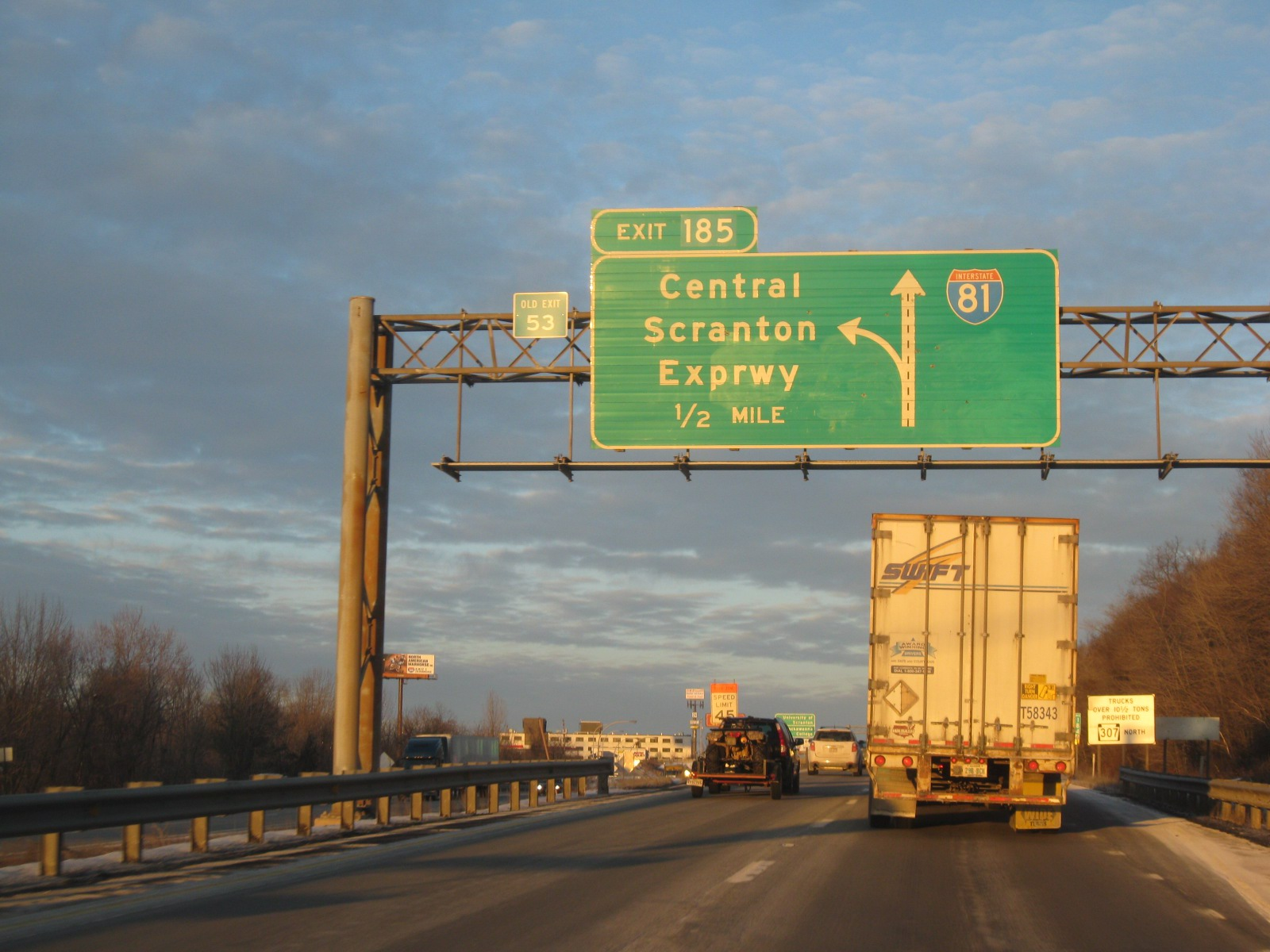
I-81 northbound approaching Central Scranton Expressway (now President Biden Expressway) in Scranton

A toll highway along the present-day I-81 corridor through Pennsylvania was planned in the 1950s. The section from Scranton to the New York state line was planned as a continuation of the Northeast Extension of the Pennsylvania Turnpike. A new extension of the turnpike between Harrisburg and Scranton was also proposed. After the Federal-Aid Highway Act of 1956 was passed, plans were changed to build a free Interstate Highway rather than a toll road. The first section to be built ran from PA 347 in Dunmore to US 11 in northern Scranton, this section opening in 1960. All of I-81 in Pennsylvania was completed by the 1970s. Construction cost nearly $443 million (equivalent to $2.83 billion in 2025).

On May 9, 2013, a tanker crashed and caught fire at the interchange between I-81 and US 22/US 322 in Harrisburg. The fire damaged the bridges carrying westbound US 22/US 322 and a ramp over I-81. At least one of those bridges, carrying US 22 eastbound over I-81 and several ramps, and possibly another, the ramp carrying traffic from I-81 northbound to US 22/US 322 westbound, would have to be demolished and replaced. The fire resulted in about 10 miles (16 km) of I-81 being closed in both directions, with traffic being diverted along the southern portion of the Capital Beltway. The highway was not fully reopened until the evening of May 13.

== Future ==
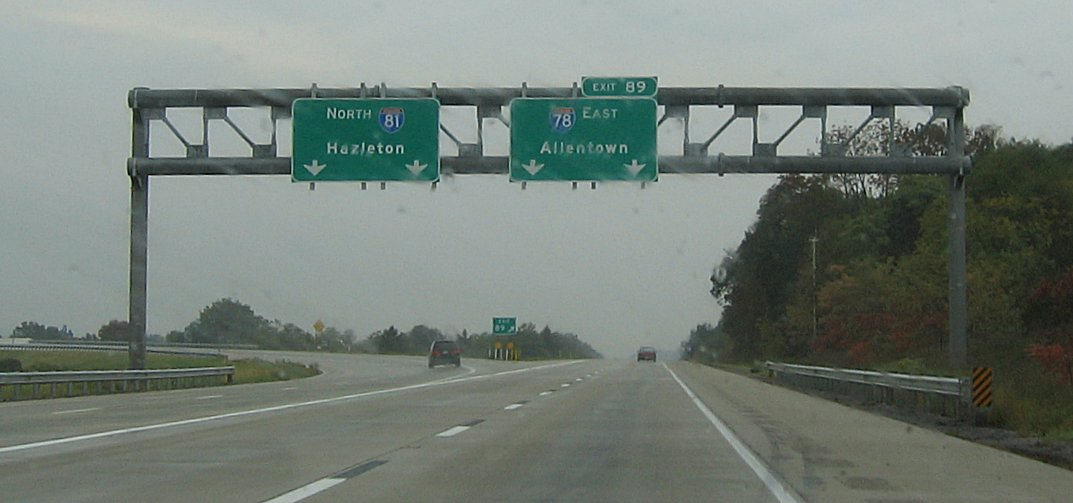
I-81 northbound at western terminus of I-78 in Union Township, Lebanon County

=== Scranton Beltway ===
On April 28, 2016, plans were announced for a Scranton Beltway to use the Pennsylvania Turnpike Northeast Extension (I-476) as a bypass for I-81 around the heavily congested segment through Scranton and its suburbs. The turnpike between the two I-81 interchanges carries an average of 10,000 vehicles per day versus 80,000 on the parallel segment of I-81. This project will build two high-speed connections between I-476 and I-81: one south of Scranton in Dupont and one north of Scranton in South Abington Township. Tolls on the connections will be paid with E-ZPass or toll by plate. Construction of this project is expected to cost $160 million. In 2021, design work on the project resumed, with construction expected to begin in 2025.

=== New interchange in Chambersburg ===
On October 24, 2018, the Pennsylvania Department of Transportation (PennDOT) released their plans for a new exit 12 on I-81, at Guilford Springs Road, estimated to cost around $23 million. The purpose for the exit is to improve access for trucks to the various distribution warehouses south of Chambersburg, such as Target. As such, Guilford Springs Road will be widened to three lanes as a part of this project. PennDOT started obtaining environmental clearances and rights-of-way in 2020 from approximately 7-10 properties. Construction on the $50 million project commenced in September 2026, with an expected completion date of 2030.

== Exit list ==
County	Location	mi	km	Old exit	New exit	Destinations	Notes
Franklin	Antrim Township	0.00	0.00	–	–	I-81 south – Hagerstown	Continuation into Maryland
Franklin	Antrim Township	0.00	0.00	–	1	PA 163 – State Line	Southbound ramps are in Maryland
Franklin	Antrim Township	2.50	4.02	2	3	US 11 (Molly Pitcher Highway)	
Franklin	Greencastle	4.80	7.72	3	5	PA 16 – Greencastle, Waynesboro	Serves Whitetail Ski Resort
Franklin	Guilford Township	9.70	15.61	4	10	PA 914 – Marion	
Franklin	Guilford Township	12.20	19.63	–	12	Guilford Springs Road	Under construction; expected to open in 2030
Franklin	Chambersburg	14.00	22.53	5	14	PA 316 (Wayne Avenue)	Serves Chambersburg Business District
Franklin	Chambersburg	15.60	25.11	6	16	US 30 (Lincoln Way)	Serves Gettysburg
Franklin	Chambersburg	16.70	26.88	7	17	Walker Road	Serves Norland Avenue and Wilson College
Franklin	Greene Township	19.80	31.87	8	20	PA 997 – Scotland	Serves Penn State Mont Alto and Letterkenny Army Depot
Franklin	Southampton Township	24.10	38.79	9	24	PA 696 (Fayette Street)	
Cumberland	Southampton–Shippensburg township line	28.40	45.71	10	29	PA 174 (King Street)	Serves Shippensburg University
Cumberland	Penn Township	36.80	59.22	11	37	PA 233 – Newville	Serves Park and ride lot
Cumberland	South Middleton Township	43.90	70.65	12	44	PA 465 – Plainfield	Serves Carlisle Fairgrounds
Cumberland	Carlisle	45.50	73.23	13	45	To College Street	Access via Walnut Bottom Road; serves Penn State Dickinson Law
Cumberland	Carlisle	46.40	74.67	14	47	PA 34 (Hanover Street)	Signed as exits 47A (south) and 47B (north) southbound; serves Dickinson College, Mount Holly Springs, and Gettysburg
Cumberland	South Middleton Township	47.90	77.09	15	48	PA 74 (York Road)	Northbound exit and southbound entrance; serves U.S. Army War College
Cumberland	South Middleton–Middlesex township line	48.40	77.89	16	49	PA 641 (High Street)	Southbound exit and northbound entrance; serves U.S. Army War College
Cumberland	Middlesex Township	51.50	82.88	17	52	US 11 to I-76 Toll / Penna Turnpike – New Kingstown, Middlesex	Signed as exits 52A (north) and 52B (south) northbound
Cumberland	Silver Spring Township	56.70	91.25	18	57	PA 114 – Mechanicsburg	
Cumberland	Hampden Township	59.00	94.95	19	59	PA 581 east to I-83 / US 11 – Camp Hill	I-83 not signed southbound; western terminus and exits 1A-B on PA 581
Cumberland	Hampden Township	60.70	97.69	20	61	PA 944 (Wertzville Road)	
Cumberland	East Pennsboro Township	64.60	103.96	21	65	US 11 / US 15 – Enola, Marysville	Signed as exits 65A (south) and 65B (north); serves Central Penn College
Susquehanna River		65.30	105.09	George N. Wade Memorial Bridge			
Dauphin	Susquehanna Township	65.80	105.89	22	66	Front Street	Serves Harrisburg University, Harrisburg Transportation Center, and City Island
Dauphin	Harrisburg	67.00	107.83	23	67	US 22 / US 322 west to PA 230 east – Harrisburg, State College	Southern end of US 322 concurrency; signed as exits 67A (east) and 67B (west); serves Harrisburg Area Community College
Dauphin	Susquehanna Township	68.70	110.56	24	69	Progress Avenue	Serves Widener University Commonwealth Law School
Dauphin	Lower Paxton Township	69.60	112.01	25	70	I-83 south / US 322 east to I-76 Toll / Penna Turnpike – South Harrisburg, Hershey, York	Northern end of US 322 concurrency; northern terminus and exits 51B-A on I-83; serves Harrisburg International Airport and Lancaster
Dauphin	Lower Paxton Township	72.30	116.36	26	72	To US 22 – Paxtonia, Linglestown	Signed as exits 72A (US 22) and 72B (Linglestown) northbound; access via Mountain Road; US 22 not signed southbound
Dauphin	West Hanover Township	76.60	123.28	27	77	PA 39 – Manada Hill, Hershey	
Dauphin	West Hanover Township	80.30	129.23	28	80	To PA 743 south – Grantville, Hershey	Access via Bow Creek Road; serves Hollywood Casino at Penn National Race Course
Lebanon	East Hanover Township	85.10	136.96	29	85	PA 934 south – Annville, Fort Indiantown Gap	Access to Fort Indiantown Gap via Fisher Avenue; signed as exits 85A (PA 934) and 85B (Fort Indiantown) northbound
Lebanon	Union Township	88.50	142.43	–	89	I-78 east – Allentown	Western terminus and exits 1B-A on I-78
Lebanon	Union Township	90.10	145.00	30	90	PA 72 – Lebanon	Access via Fisher Avenue
Schuylkill	Pine Grove Township	99.30	159.81	31	100	PA 443 – Pine Grove	
Schuylkill	Tremont Township	104.10	167.53	32	104	PA 125 – Ravine	Access via Molleystown Road
Schuylkill	Frailey Township	106.60	171.56	33	107	US 209 – Tremont, Tower City	
Schuylkill	Frailey Township	111.30	179.12	34	112	PA 25 – Hegins	
Schuylkill	Foster Township	115.90	186.52	35	116	PA 901 – Minersville	Serves Mount Carmel
Schuylkill	Butler Township	118.40	190.55	35A	119	Highridge Park Road	Serves Schuylkill Highridge Business Park, Heckscherville, and Gordon
Schuylkill	Frackville	123.70	199.08	36	124	PA 61 – Saint Clair, Frackville	Signed as exits 124A (south) and 124B (north)
Schuylkill	Mahanoy Township	130.70	210.34	37	131	PA 54 – Hometown, Mahanoy City	Signed as exits 131A (east) and 131B (west)
Schuylkill	Delano Township	133.50	214.85	38	134	Delano	Access via Lakeside Avenue
Schuylkill	Kline Township	137.60	221.45	39	138	To PA 309 – McAdoo, Tamaqua	
Luzerne	Hazle Township	141.10	227.08	39A	141	PA 424 east to PA 309	Western terminus of PA 424
Luzerne	Hazle Township	142.50	229.33	40	143	PA 924 – Hazleton	Serves Humboldt Industrial Park
Luzerne	Sugarloaf Township	145.20	233.68	41	145	PA 93 – West Hazleton	Serves Penn State Hazleton
Luzerne	Butler Township	150.50	242.21	–	151	I-80 – Bloomsburg, Stroudsburg	Signed as exits 151A (east) and 151B (west); exits 260A-B on I-80
Luzerne	Dorrance Township	154.20	248.16	42	155	Dorrance	Access via Blue Ridge Trail
Luzerne	Nuangola	158.70	255.40	43	159	Nuangola	Access via Church Road
Luzerne	Hanover Township	163.90	263.77	44	164	PA 29 north – Nanticoke	Southern terminus of PA 29
Luzerne	Wilkes-Barre Township	164.70	265.06	45	165	PA 309 south / PA 309 Bus. north – Mountain Top, Wilkes-Barre	Southern end of PA 309 concurrency; signed as exits 165A (south) and 165B (north) northbound; southern terminus of PA 309 Bus.
Luzerne	Wilkes-Barre Township	167.90	270.21	46	168	Highland Park Boulevard – Wilkes-Barre	Serves Mohegan Sun Arena
Luzerne	Plains Township	169.80	273.27	47	170	PA 115 south / PA 309 north – Bear Creek, Wilkes-Barre	Northern end of PA 309 concurrency; signed as exits 170A (south) and 170B (north); northern terminus of PA 115
Luzerne	Pittston Township	174.90	281.47	48	175	PA 315 to I-476 Toll / Penna Turnpike NE Extension – Dupont, Pittston	Signed as exits 175A (south) and 175B (north) southbound
Luzerne	Avoca	177.50	285.66	49	178	PA 315 south – Avoca, Wilkes-Barre/Scranton Airport	Northern terminus of PA 315; access to Airport via Terminal Road
Lackawanna	Moosic	179.20	288.39	50	180	US 11 / PA 502 – Moosic	No southbound access to US 11 north
Lackawanna	Scranton	181.50	292.10	51	182	Montage Mountain Road / Davis Street	Serves PNC Field and Montage Mountain Ski Resort
Lackawanna	Scranton	183.90	295.96	52	184	River Street to PA 307	No southbound exit
Lackawanna	Scranton	184.20	296.44	52	184	PA 307 (Moosic Street)	Southbound exit only
Lackawanna	Scranton	184.30	296.60	53	185	President Biden Expressway west	Eastern terminus of President Biden Expressway; serves University of Scranton and Lackawanna College
Lackawanna	Dunmore	186.70	300.46	54	186	Drinker Street	Northbound exit and southbound entrance
Lackawanna	Dunmore	187.10	301.11	–	187	I-84 east / I-380 south / US 6 east – Milford, Mount Pocono, Carbondale	Southern end of US 6 concurrency; Throop Dunmore Interchange; western terminus of I-84; northern terminus of I-380
Lackawanna	Dunmore	188.10	302.72	55	188	PA 347 – Dunmore, Throop	Serves Penn State Scranton Campus and Marywood University
Lackawanna	Scranton	189.80	305.45	56	190	Main Avenue – Dickson City	
Lackawanna	Scranton	191.00	307.38	57	191	US 11 (North Scranton Expressway) / US 6 Bus. east – Dickson City	Signed as exits 191A (US 6 Bus.) and 191B (US 11); western terminus of US 6 Bus.
Lackawanna	South Abington Township	193.40	311.25	58	194	I-476 Toll south / Penna Turnpike NE Extension south / US 6 west / US 11 – Clarks Summit	Northern end of US 6 concurrency; northern terminus and exit 131 on I-476 / Turnpike
Lackawanna	Scott Township	197.20	317.36	59	197	PA 632 – Waverly	
Lackawanna	Scott Township	198.80	319.94	60	199	PA 524 – Scott	
Lackawanna	Scott Township	200.50	322.67	61	201	PA 438 – East Benton	
Lackawanna	Benton Township	201.60	324.44	62	202	PA 107 – Fleetville, Tompkinsville	Serves Keystone College
Susquehanna	Lenox Township	206.00	331.52	63	206	PA 374 – Glenwood, Lenoxville	Serves Elk Mountain Ski Area
Susquehanna	Lenox Township	211.10– 211.40	339.73– 340.22	64	211	PA 92 / PA 106 – Lenox	Signed for PA 92 southbound, PA 106 northbound
Susquehanna	Harford Township	216.60	348.58	65	217	PA 547 – Harford	
Susquehanna	New Milford Township	219.30	352.93	66	219	PA 848 – Gibson	
Susquehanna	New Milford	223.50	359.69	67	223	PA 492 – New Milford, Lakeside	
Susquehanna	Great Bend Township	230.40	370.79	68	230	PA 171 – Great Bend, Susquehanna	
Susquehanna	Great Bend Township	232.63	374.38	–	–	I-81 north – Binghamton	Continuation into New York
1.000 mi = 1.609 km; 1.000 km = 0.621 mi: Concurrency terminus; Incomplete access; Unopened

== See also ==
Interstate 81
Previous state: Maryland	Pennsylvania	Next state: New York
