= U.S. Route 11 in Pennsylvania =

Highway in Pennsylvania

U.S. Route 11
- US 11 highlighted in red

Route information
- Maintained by PennDOT
- Length: 248.4 mi (399.8 km)

Major junctions
- South end: US 11 at the Maryland state line in State Line
- I-81 near Greencastle; US 30 in Chambersburg; I-76 Toll / Penna Turnpike in Carlisle; I-81 in Carlisle; US 15 in Camp Hill; US 22 / US 322 near Duncannon; US 15 in Shamokin Dam; I-80 near Berwick; I-81 in Moosic; I-81 / US 6 / I-476 Toll / Penna Turnpike NE Extension in Clarks Summit
- North end: US 11 at the New York state line in Great Bend

Location
- Country: United States
- State: Pennsylvania
- Counties: Franklin, Cumberland, Perry, Dauphin, Juniata, Snyder, Union, Northumberland, Montour, Columbia, Luzerne, Lackawanna, Wyoming, Susquehanna

Highway system
- United States Numbered Highway System; List; Special; Divided; Pennsylvania State Route System; Interstate; US; State; Scenic; Legislative
← PA 10	→ PA 11

U.S. Route 11 (US 11) roughly parallels Interstate 81 (I-81) in the U.S. state of Pennsylvania. The route runs from the Maryland state line in Antrim Township, Franklin County, northeast to the New York state line in Great Bend Township, Susquehanna County. US 11 serves Harrisburg, Wilkes-Barre, and Scranton. Between Harrisburg and Scranton, US 11 follows the Susquehanna River, while I-81 follows a shorter route over the mountains further to the east.

== Route description ==
US 11 enters Pennsylvania parallel to I-81 south of Greencastle in Antrim Township, Franklin County. The two routes head to the northeast, running parallel to each other as they pass through Chambersburg, where they intersect US 30, Shippensburg, and Carlisle. Northeast of Carlisle in Middlesex Township, US 11 has interchanges with the Pennsylvania Turnpike (I-76), and then I-81 roughly one mile (1.6 km) later. The stretch of US 11 between I-76 and I-81 is known as the "Miracle Mile" since it contains plenty of traveler services including restaurants, gas stations, lodging, truck stops, and shops. There is no direct interchange between the two Interstates, so travelers must use this stretch, or travel through downtown Carlisle, to get from one Interstate to the other.

US 11, now to the south of I-81, continues eastward into the western suburbs of Harrisburg as Carlisle Pike. This road serves a major arterial route in eastern Cumberland County. Rumored to have originally been a Native American trail, it is now a significant center of urban sprawl serving much of Harrisburg's western suburbs. The road passes through Middlesex Township, the small unincorporated village of New Kingstown, Silver Spring Township, and Hampden Township. Upon reaching Pennsylvania Route 581 (PA 581), US 11 splits from Carlisle Pike and runs concurrent with PA 581.

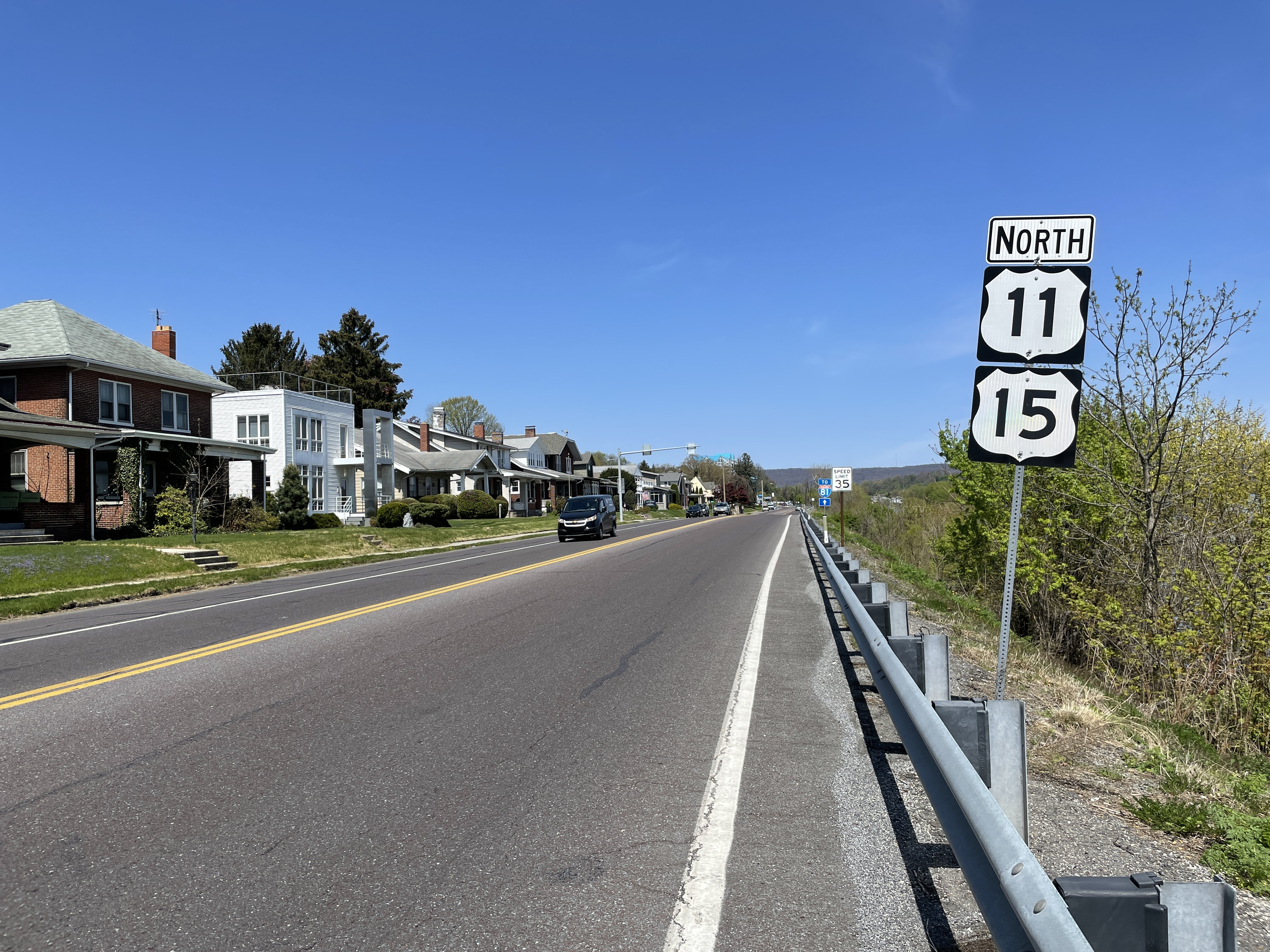
US 11/US 15 northbound in Wormleysburg

In Camp Hill, a close suburb of Harrisburg, US 11 stops paralleling I-81 and joins US 15 northward through the western suburbs of Harrisburg, crossing I-81 in this area. As the road exits the Harrisburg area, US 11 and US 15 begin to parallel the Susquehanna River as both head northward. They intersect US 22/US 322 near Duncannon and US 522 in Selinsgrove. The two routes remain overlapped to an intersection in Shamokin Dam, where US 15 branches off to the northwest, following the path of the West Branch Susquehanna River northward. US 11, in contrast, continues to parallel the main Susquehanna River, passing through municipalities such as Danville, Bloomsburg, and Berwick (where it crosses I-80) prior to reaching the Wilkes-Barre area.

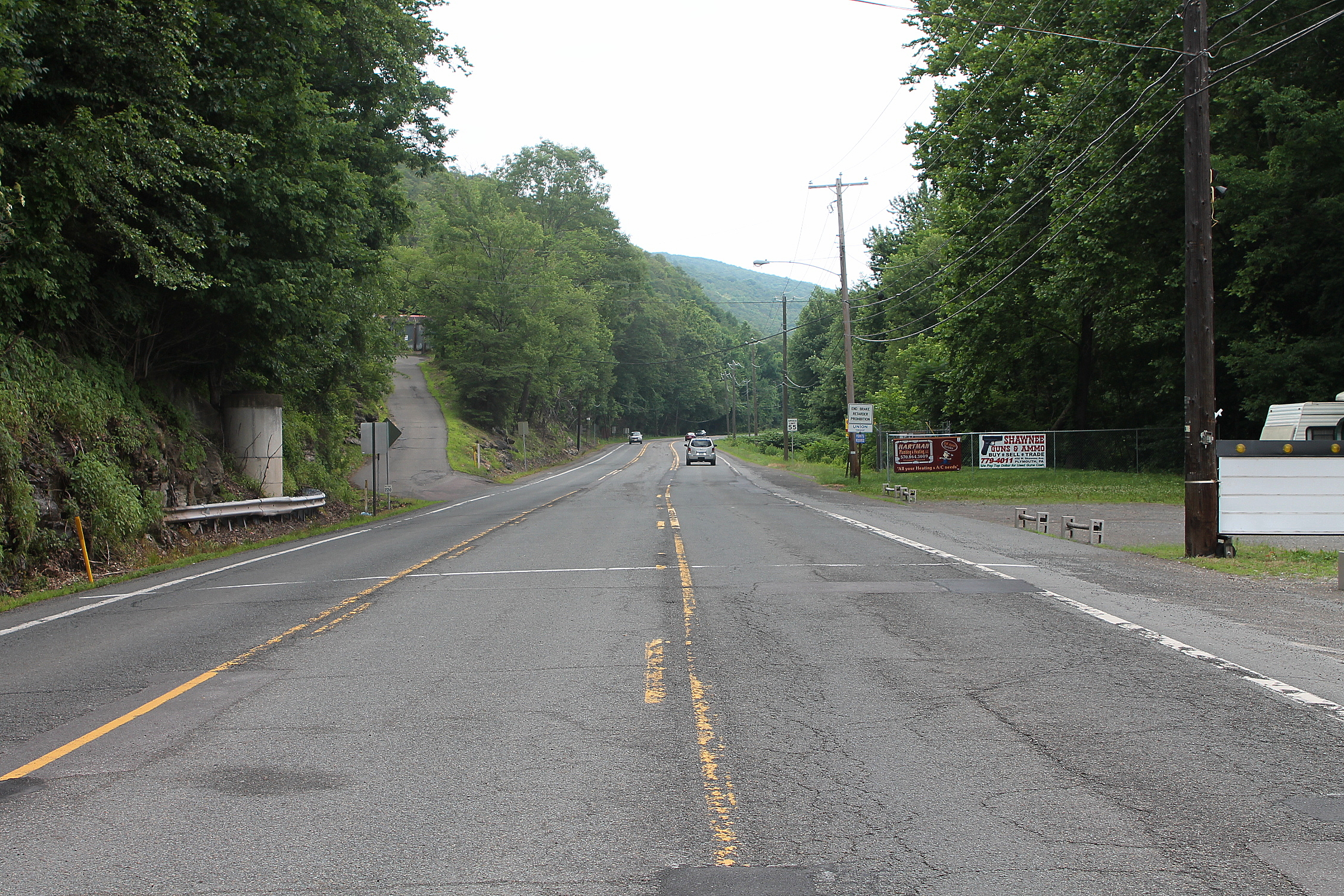
US 11 north of Shickshinny

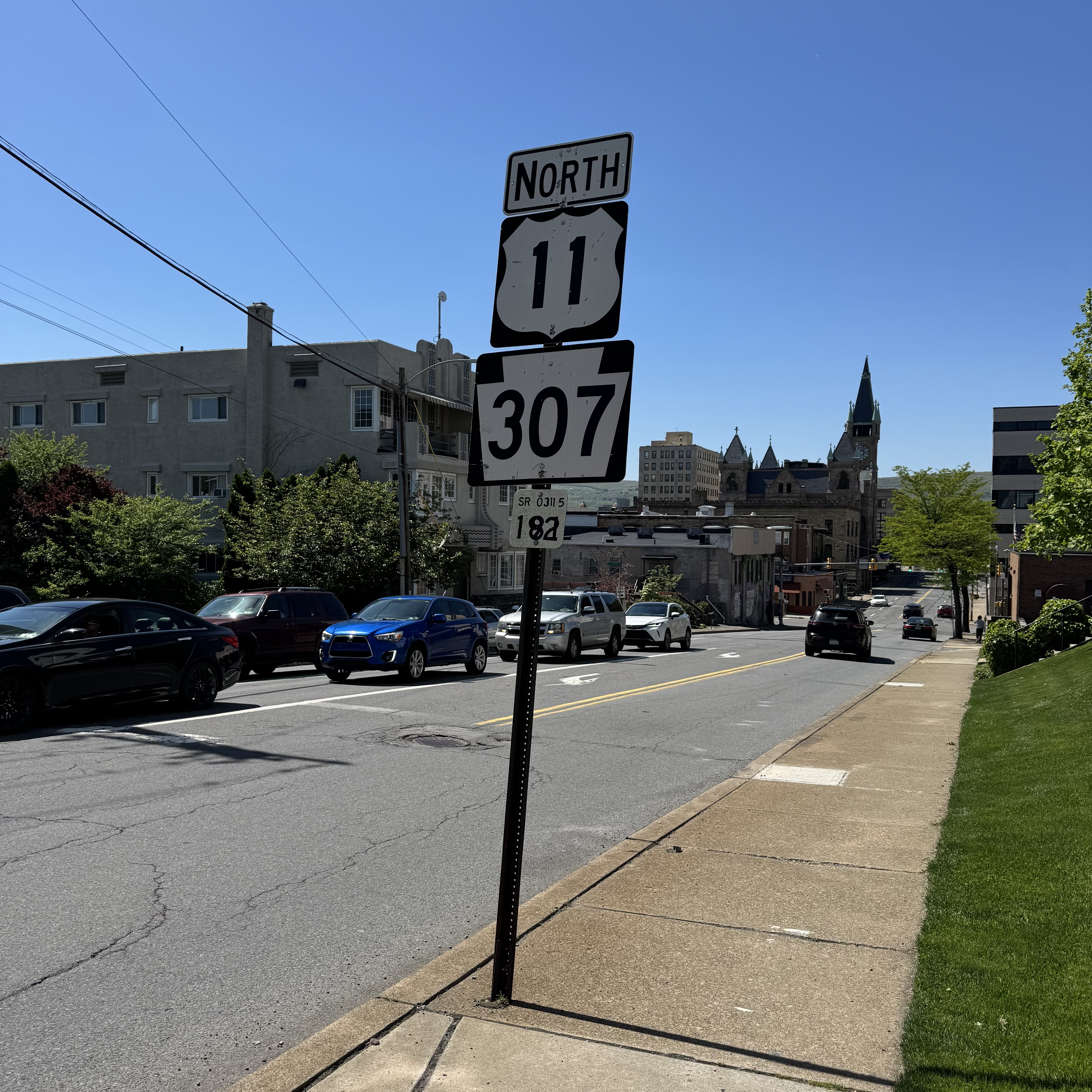
US 11/PA 307 northbound in downtown Scranton

North of Wilkes-Barre in Pittston, US 11 breaks from the Susquehanna River and begins to run parallel to I-81 once more. From Wilkes-Barre, the highway goes through nearby Scranton, becoming the North Scranton Expressway north of downtown. The North Scranton Expressway (officially the Congressman Joseph M. McDade Expressway) is a freeway north of downtown Scranton that carries US 11 and PA 307 north from the Mulberry Street Bridge over the Lackawanna River near downtown north to I-81, US 6, and US 6 Business. It carried unsigned State Route 3027 (SR 3027) until SR 0011 and SR 0307 were moved off their former routes to match the signed US 11 and PA 307 alignments (forming SR 6011 and SR 6307). SR 3027 still runs along Mulberry Street from Jefferson Avenue, where US 11 and PA 307 turn southwest, southeast to Harrison Avenue (SR 6011).

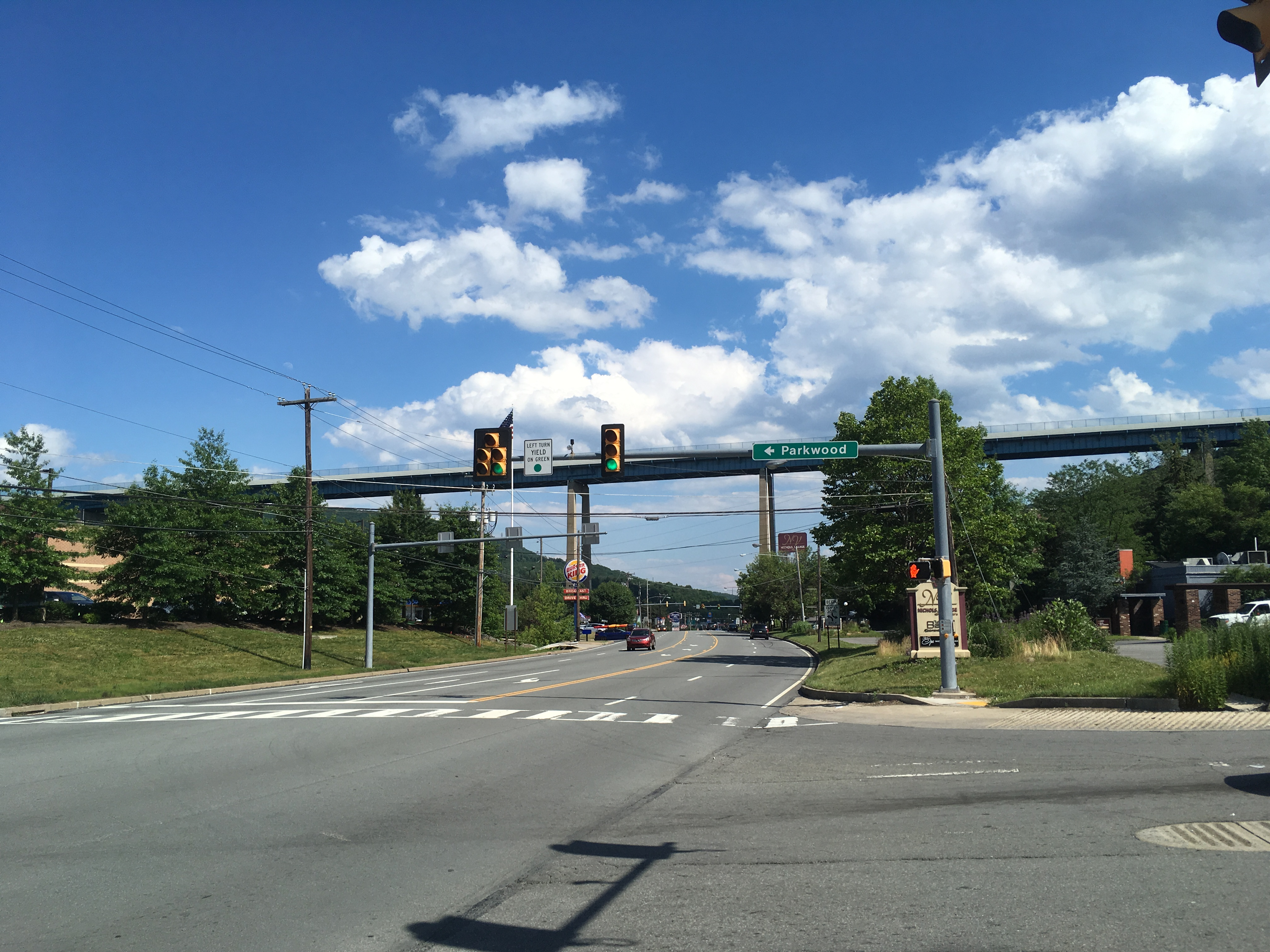
US 6 eastbound/US 11 southbound approaching the interchange with I-81 and the northern terminus of I-476 in Clarks Summit

In the northwest corner of Scranton (referred to as the Notch), US 11 intersects US 6. US 6 joins US 11 westward to Factoryville, where US 11 separates from US 6 and resumes its northerly trek through Susquehanna County to the New York–Pennsylvania border in Great Bend Township. This stretch was originally built from 1918 to 1922 on the old route of the Delaware, Lackawanna and Western Railroad and is called the "Lackawanna Trail". It parallels the current rail route between Scranton and Binghamton, New York, the Nicholson Cutoff, allowing views of the massive earthworks and the Tunkhannock Viaduct.

== History ==
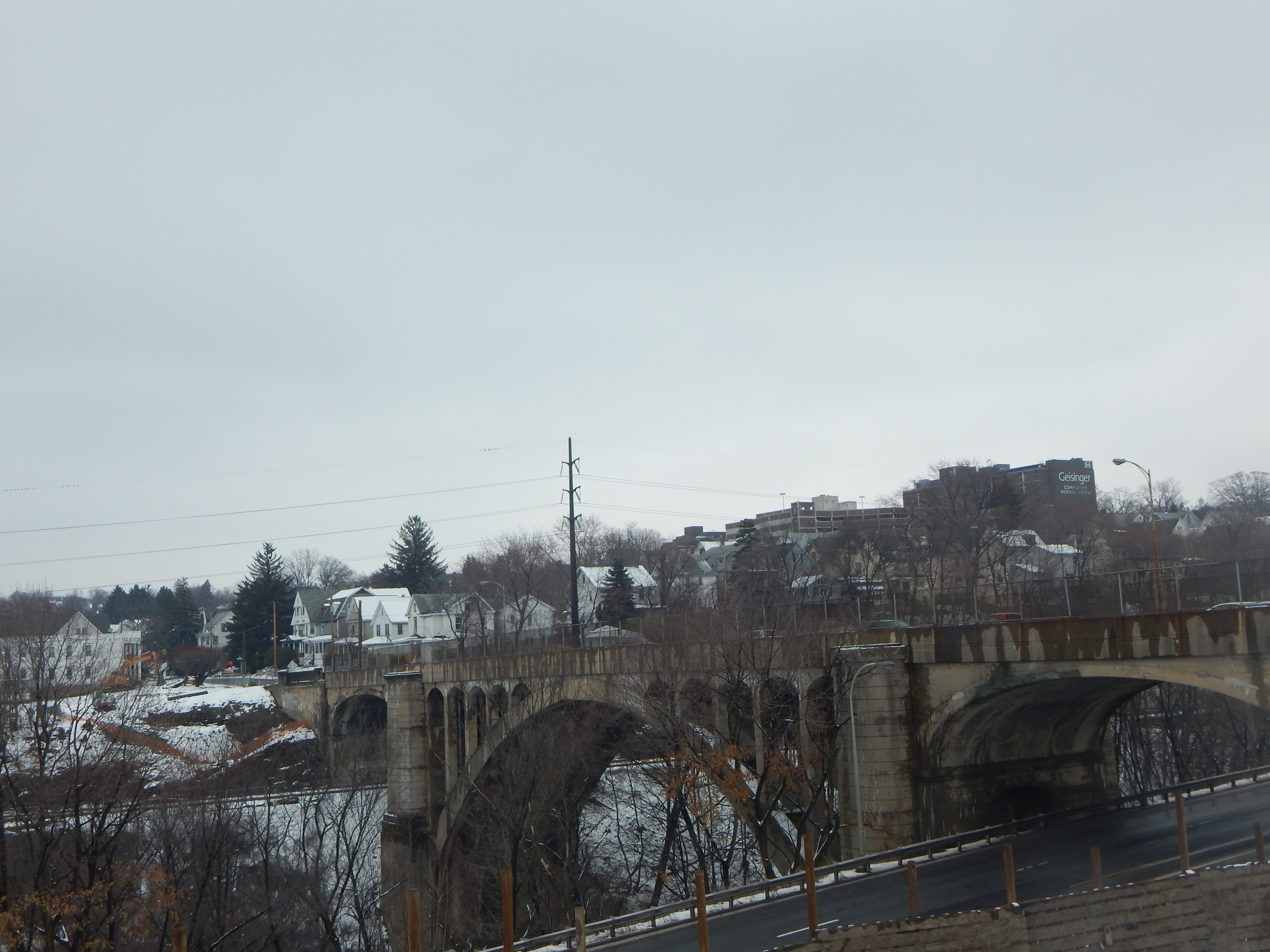
The Harrison Avenue Bridge in Scranton, part of old US 11

Prior to 1941, US 11 followed Walnut Bottom Road between Shippensburg and Carlisle while PA 33 ran along the Governor Rittner Highway. In and around Harrisburg, the highway crossed the Susquehanna River to directly service the city using the Carlisle Pike, Market Street, and the Market Street Bridge, leaving north via a concurrency with US 22 (which at the time followed Front Street out of Harrisburg). A bypass route of US 11 also existed at the time in Lemoyne, which has since been superseded by US 11 proper between Market and Front streets. In 1941, US 11 and PA 33 swapped alignments, with US 11 moving to Governor Rittner Highway and PA 33 moving to Walnut Bottom Road. Additionally, US 11 was rerouted to the west side of the river, bypassing Harrisburg entirely and replacing US 11 Bypass in Lemoyne.

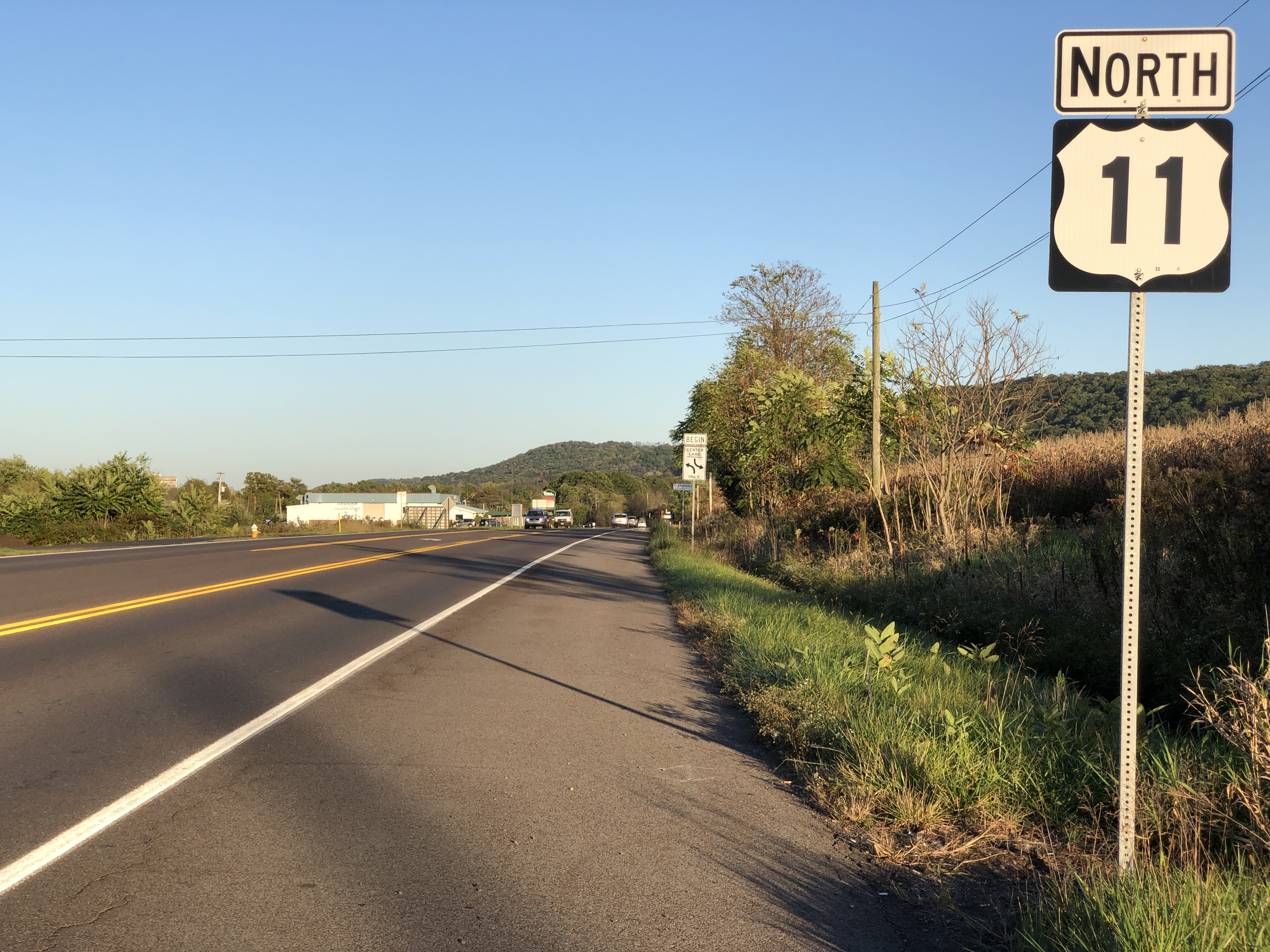
US 11 northbound in Danville

Prior to 1989, US 11 followed an older alignment bypassing downtown Scranton. From Pittston Avenue, US 11 turned right onto Moosic Street and climbed the hill. At Crown Avenue, it turned left, joining PA 307 which was coming from the opposite direction on Moosic Street. Together, they crossed the Harrison Avenue bridge and continued about a mile to Myrtle Street. PA 307 and US 11 turned right on Myrtle Street for one block then left on Wheeler Avenue. After entering the borough of Dunmore and crossing the old Erie Railroad tracks, the pair turned left on Cherry Street then bore right onto South Blakely Street, entering downtown Dunmore. They turned left onto Green Ridge Street, reentering Scranton in the Green Ridge section of the city. At the end of Green Ridge Street at North Scranton Junior High School, they turned right onto Main Avenue entering the Providence section of the city. After a half mile (0.80 km), they turned left onto West Market Street. PA 307 left US 11 by turning left onto Keyser Avenue. US 11 continued on West Market Street to Saltry Place, where it turned left for one block then right onto the North Scranton Expressway. From it, it joined its current alignment heading toward Clarks Summit. At one time, this final intersection with the expressway was a four-way traffic circle servicing Oak Street, Market Street, the Scranton Carbondale Highway (US 6), and Northern Boulevard (today's US 11).

== Major intersections ==
County	Location	mi	km	Destinations	Notes
Franklin	Antrim Township	0.0	0.0	US 11 south (Pennsylvania Avenue) – Hagerstown	Continuation into Maryland
Franklin	Antrim Township	0.0	0.0	PA 163 west (Mason Dixon Road) to I-81	Eastern terminus of PA 163
Franklin	Antrim Township	2.2	3.5	I-81 – Hagerstown, Chambersburg	I-81 exit 3
Franklin	Greencastle	5.0	8.0	PA 16 (Buchanan Trail/West Baltimore Street) to I-81 – Mercersburg, Waynesboro	
Franklin	Guilford Township	10.5	16.9	PA 914 east (Swamp Fox Road) to I-81	Western terminus of PA 914
Franklin	Chambersburg	15.4	24.8	PA 316 south (Wayne Street) to I-81	Northern terminus of PA 316
Franklin	Chambersburg	16.0	25.7	US 30 east (Queen Street) to I-81 – Gettysburg	
Franklin	Chambersburg			US 30 west (Lincoln Way) – McConnellsburg	
Franklin	Greene Township	19.7	31.7	PA 433 north / PA 997 Truck north (Sunset Pike) – Pleasant Hall, Orrstown, Roxbury	Southern terminus of PA 433; south end of PA 997 Truck concurrency
Franklin	Greene Township	21.0	33.8	PA 997 (Cumberland Highway) to I-81 – Letterkenny Army Depot, Scotland	North end of PA 997 Truck concurrency
Cumberland	Shippensburg	26.7	43.0	PA 533 west (Morris Street) – Orrstown	South end of PA 533 concurrency
Cumberland	Shippensburg			PA 696 south (Fayette Street) to I-81	South end of PA 696 concurrency
Cumberland	Shippensburg	26.9	43.3	PA 696 north (Earl Street)	North end of PA 696 concurrency
Cumberland	Shippensburg Township	28.0	45.1	PA 174 east (Walnut Bottom Road) to I-81	Western terminus of PA 174
Cumberland	Southampton Township	29.3	47.2	PA 533 east – Newville	North end of PA 533 concurrency
Cumberland	Penn Township	37.4	60.2	PA 233 (Centerville Road) to I-81 – Newville	
Cumberland	Carlisle	44.9	72.3	PA 465 (Allen Road) to I-81 – Plainfield, Mooredale	
Cumberland	Carlisle	46.8	75.3	PA 641 west (Orange Street)	South end of PA 641 concurrency
Cumberland	Carlisle	47.4	76.3	PA 74 north (College Street)	South end of PA 74 concurrency
Cumberland	Carlisle	47.8	76.9	PA 34 south (Hanover Street) to I-81 PA 74 south / PA 641 east (High Street) to I-81	North end of PA 74/PA 641 concurrencies; south end of PA 34 concurrency
Cumberland	Carlisle	48.2	77.6	PA 34 north (Spring Road)	North end of PA 34 concurrency
Cumberland	Middlesex Township	50.7	81.6	I-76 Toll / Penna Turnpike – Philadelphia, Pittsburgh	I-76 / Turnpike exit 226
Cumberland	Middlesex Township	51.8	83.4	I-81 – Chambersburg, Harrisburg	I-81 exit 52
Cumberland	Silver Spring Township	57.4	92.4	PA 114 (New Willow Mill Road) to I-81 – Wertzville, Mechanicsburg	
Cumberland	Hampden Township	60.2	96.9	South end of freeway	
Cumberland	Hampden Township	60.2	96.9	PA 581 west to I-81 – Carlisle	South end of PA 581 concurrency; PA 581 exit 3
Cumberland	Camp Hill	61.7	99.3	PA 641 – Mechanicsburg	PA 581 exit 4; southbound exit and northbound entrance
Cumberland	Camp Hill	62.7	100.9	US 15 south – Gettysburg PA 581 east to I-83 – Harrisburg, York	South end of US 15 concurrency; north end of PA 581 concurrency; PA 581 exit 5
Cumberland	Camp Hill	62.7	100.9	North end of freeway	
Cumberland	Camp Hill			PA 641 west (Trindle Road) – Mechanicsburg	Eastern terminus of PA 641
Cumberland	Camp Hill–East Pennsboro Township line			M. Harvey Taylor Bridge – Harrisburg	Northbound exit and southbound entrance
Cumberland	East Pennsboro Township	67.5	108.6	PA 944 west (State Street)	Eastern terminus of PA 944; no access from PA 944 to northbound US 11/US 15
Cumberland	East Pennsboro Township	70.1	112.8	I-81 (Capital Beltway) – Carlisle, Harrisburg	I-81 exit 65
Perry	Marysville	72.7	117.0	PA 850 west (Valley Street)	Eastern terminus of PA 850
Perry	Penn Township			South end of freeway	
Perry	Penn Township–Duncannon line	80.2	129.1	PA 274 west – Duncannon	Eastern terminus of PA 274
Dauphin	Reed Township	83.0	133.6	US 22 / US 322 – Harrisburg, Lewistown	
Perry	Watts Township			North end of freeway	
Perry	Buffalo Township	93.8	151.0	PA 34 south (Hunters Valley Road) – Newport	Northern terminus of PA 34
Perry	Liverpool	95.6	153.9	PA 17 west – Millerstown	Eastern terminus of PA 17
Perry	Liverpool Township	99.9	160.8	PA 104 north – Middleburg	Southern terminus of PA 104
Juniata	No major junctions				
Snyder	Penn Township			South end of freeway	
Snyder	Penn Township	113.0	181.9	PA 35 south – Selinsgrove	Northern terminus of PA 35
Snyder	Monroe Township	115.6	186.0	US 522 south – Selinsgrove	Northern terminus of US 522
Snyder	Monroe Township			North end of freeway	
Snyder	Shamokin Dam	118.6	190.9	PA 61 south / PA 147 south – Sunbury	Interchange; northern terminus of PA 61; south end of PA 147 concurrency
Snyder	Shamokin Dam	119.1	191.7	US 15 north / PA 147 north – Lewisburg	North end of US 15/PA 147 concurrency
Union	No major junctions				
Northumberland	Northumberland	121.5	195.5	PA 405 north (Duke Street) – Milton	South end of PA 405 concurrency
Northumberland	Northumberland	121.7	195.9	PA 405 south (King Street) – Sunbury	North end of PA 405 concurrency
Montour	Danville	132.8	213.7	PA 54 (Continental Boulevard) to I-80 – Washingtonville, Riverside	
Columbia	Montour Township	140.5	226.1	PA 42 south (Rupert Drive) – Catawissa	Interchange; south end of PA 42 concurrency
Columbia	Bloomsburg	140.8	226.6	PA 42 north to I-80 – Millville, Buckhorn	Interchange; north end of PA 42 concurrency. Partially closed access to Bloomsburg Fair before the T intersection past the interchange.
Columbia	Bloomsburg	142.4	229.2	PA 487 north (Lightstreet Road) to I-80 – Lightstreet	South end of PA 487 concurrency
Columbia	Bloomsburg	142.8	229.8	PA 487 south (Poplar Street) – Catawissa	North end of PA 487 concurrency
Columbia	South Centre Township	148.5	239.0	I-80 – Milton, Hazleton	I-80 exit 241
Columbia	Berwick	153.9	247.7	PA 93 north (Orange Street) – Orangeville	South end of PA 93 concurrency
Columbia	Berwick	154.6	248.8	PA 93 south (Market Street)	North end of PA 93 concurrency
Luzerne	Salem Township–Shickshinny line	164.6	264.9	PA 239 south – Mocanaqua, Wapwallopen	South end of PA 239 concurrency
Luzerne	Shickshinny	165.2	265.9	PA 239 north (Union Street)	North end of PA 239 concurrency
Luzerne	Plymouth Township	173.9	279.9	PA 29 north (Mill Street) – Silkworth	South end of PA 29 concurrency
Luzerne	Plymouth Township	175.3	282.1	PA 29 south (South Cross Valley Expressway) to I-81 – Nanticoke, Wilkes-Barre	Interchange, north end of PA 29 concurrency
Luzerne	Kingston	182.4	293.5	PA 309 north (North Cross Valley Expressway) – Luzerne, Dallas	PA 309 exit 5; access to northbound PA 309 and access from southbound PA 309
Luzerne	West Pittston	188.6	303.5	PA 92 north (Exeter Avenue) – Tunkhannock	Southern terminus of PA 92
Luzerne	Pittston Township–Dupont line	191.7	308.5	To I-81 – Hughestown, Dupont	Interchange; access via Laurel Street/Main Street
Lackawanna	Moosic			PA 502 east to I-81	Western terminus of PA 502
Lackawanna	Moosic	194.1	312.4	I-81 – Wilkes-Barre, Scranton	I-81 exit 180
Lackawanna	Scranton	199.0	320.3	PA 307 south (Moosic Street)	South end of PA 307 concurrency
Lackawanna	Scranton	199.1	320.4	To I-81 / I-84 east / I-380 south	Interchange; southbound exit and northbound entrance; access via President Biden Expressway
Lackawanna	Scranton			South end of freeway	
Lackawanna	Scranton	200.0	321.9	7th Avenue / Providence Road	
Lackawanna	Scranton	200.7	323.0	Main Avenue	
Lackawanna	Scranton	202.1	325.2	PA 307 north (Keyser Avenue)	North end of PA 307 concurrency; access to Lackawanna County Coal Mine Tour, McDade Park, and Anthracite Museum
Lackawanna	Scranton	203.0	326.7	US 6 Bus. east to US 6 / I-81 – Dickson City	West end of US 6 Bus.
Lackawanna	Scranton			North end of freeway	
Lackawanna	South Abington Township	205.2	330.2	I-81 / US 6 east / I-476 Toll south / Penna Turnpike NE Extension south – Binghamton, Wilkes-Barre	I-81 exit 194; northern terminus and exit 131 on I-476 / Turnpike; south end of US 6 concurrency
Lackawanna	South Abington Township	206.5	332.3	PA 407 north (South Abington Road) – Clarks Green	Southern terminus of PA 407
Lackawanna	Dalton	210.4	338.6	PA 632 east – Dalton	Interchange; western terminus of PA 632
Lackawanna	La Plume Township	212.2	341.5	PA 438 east	Western terminus of PA 438
Wyoming	Factoryville–Clinton Township line	214.2	344.7	PA 107 east – Lake Sheridan, Fleetville	Western terminus of PA 107
Wyoming	Clinton Township	214.8	345.7	US 6 west (Grand Army of the Republic Highway) – Tunkhannock	Northbound exit and southbound entrance; north end of US 6 concurrency
Wyoming	Nicholson	219.6	353.4	PA 92 (State Street)	Interchange
Susquehanna	Hop Bottom	225.6	363.1	PA 167 north (Main Street) – Brooklyn, Montrose	Southern terminus of PA 167
Susquehanna	Harford Township	229.6	369.5	PA 106 east to I-81 – Carbondale	Western terminus of PA 106
Susquehanna	Harford Township	229.9	370.0	PA 547 east	Western terminus of PA 547
Susquehanna	New Milford Township	238.3	383.5	PA 706 west (Wyalusing Street) – Montrose	Eastern terminus of PA 706
Susquehanna	New Milford	239.2	385.0	PA 848 east (Harford Road) – Harford, Gibson	Western terminus of PA 848
Susquehanna	New Milford	239.4	385.3	PA 492 east (Jackson Street) to I-81	Western terminus of PA 492
Susquehanna	Great Bend Township	246.1	396.1	PA 171 south (State Street) to I-81 – Susquehanna	Northern terminus of PA 171
Susquehanna	Great Bend Township	248.4	399.8	US 11 north (Kirkwood Avenue) – Binghamton	Continuation into New York
1.000 mi = 1.609 km; 1.000 km = 0.621 mi: Concurrency terminus; Electronic toll collection; Incomplete access

== In popular culture ==
Route 11 in Pennsylvania is where Nan Adams has her tire blow-out in the "Twilight Zone" episode "The Hitch Hiker".

== See also ==
U.S. Route 11
Previous state: Maryland	Pennsylvania	Next state: New York
