= Pennsylvania Route 848 =

State highway in Susquehanna County, Pennsylvania, US

Pennsylvania Route 848

Route information
- Maintained by PennDOT
- Length: 6.664 mi (10.725 km)
- Existed: April 1961–present

Major junctions
- West end: US 11 in New Milford
- I-81 in New Milford Township
- East end: PA 547 in Gibson Township

Location
- Country: United States
- State: Pennsylvania
- Counties: Susquehanna

Highway system
- Pennsylvania State Route System; Interstate; US; State; Scenic; Legislative
← PA 847	→ PA 849

Pennsylvania Route 848 (PA 848) is a 6.66-mile-long (10.72 km) state highway located in Susquehanna County in Pennsylvania. The western terminus is at U.S. Route 11 (US 11) just south of PA 492 in New Milford. The eastern terminus is PA 547 in Gibson Township. PA 848 remains as a former portion of PA 371, which was originally designated in 1936 from New Milford to the New York state line. The highway was designated as PA 848 in 1961, seven years after it was truncated from New Milford.

== Route description ==
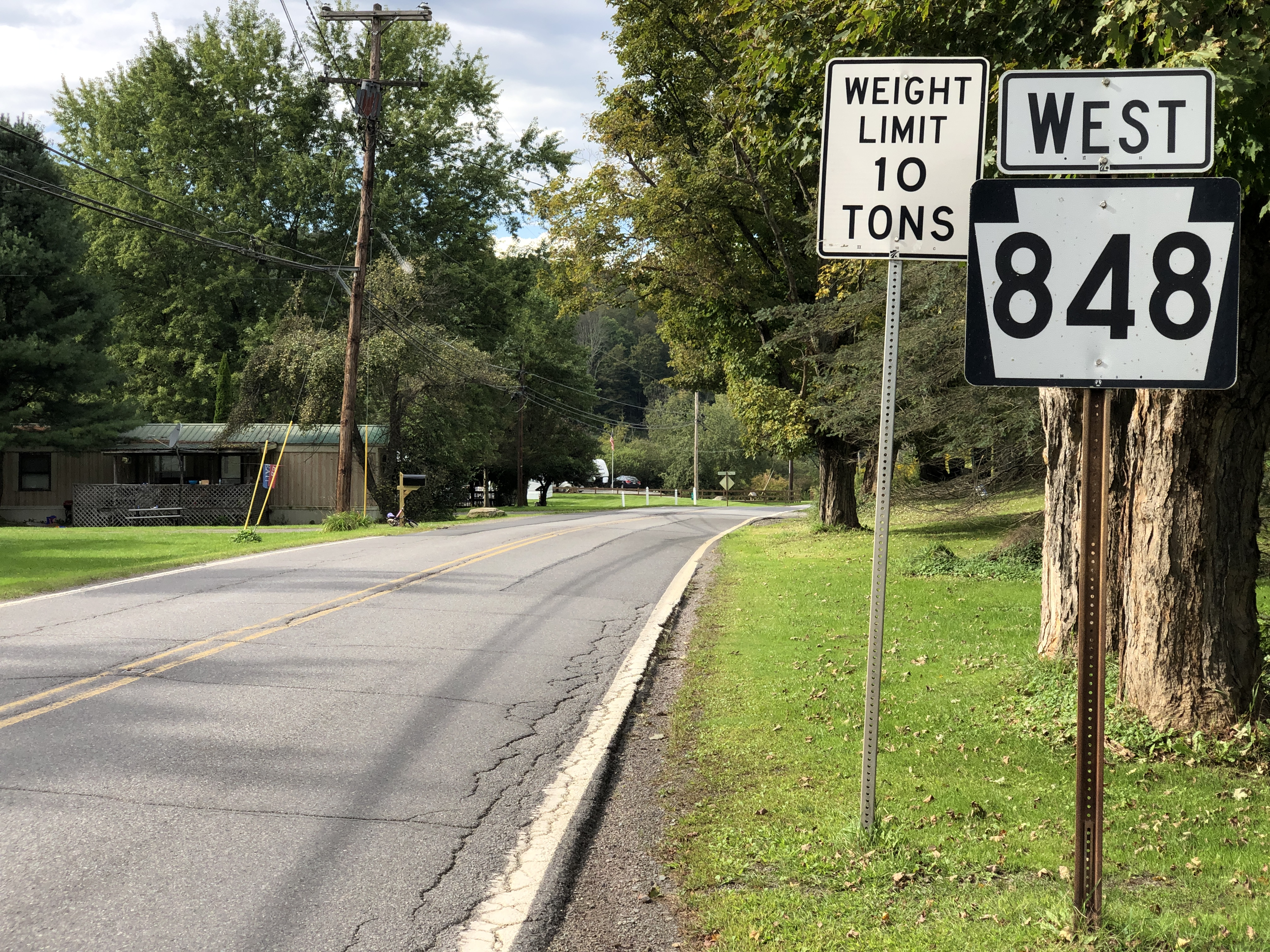
PA 848 westbound in New Milford Township

PA 848 begins at an intersection with US 11 (Main Street) in New Milford. The route runs east towards Cobb Street, making a bend to the southeast. Passing through a residential area, the route leaves the borough of New Milford and enters the township of New Milford. The surroundings become more rural, and at the intersection with State Route 2061 (SR 2061), the route curves to the southeast into a dense forested area. PA 848 remains a two-lane road through New Milford Township. The route soon reaches SR 2063 (Far Hill Road) and later with SR 2081 (Oliver Road), which serves as the connection between Interstate 81's (I-81) exit 219 southbound and PA 848. After crossing over I-81, PA 848 intersects the northbound ramps before returning to the rural Gibson Township. After the intersection with Creek Road, PA 848 enters the village of Gibson, where it terminates at an intersection with PA 547 and Township Road 574.

== History ==
The route of PA 848 began as an alignment of the Cochecton and Great Bend Turnpike (a portion of the Great Bend and Newburgh Turnpike), a 19th Century turnpike built from Great Bend, Pennsylvania, to Newburgh, New York. The road was completed in Pennsylvania in 1811, five years after construction began. The turnpike did not fare after the mid-1800s, with the road abandoned in 1853. When the modern state highway system for Pennsylvania debuted in 1928, the alignment of future PA 371 was not included. In 1936, PA 371 was designated on its alignment from New Milford to the New York state line; however, this would only last sixteen years, as the Pennsylvania Department of Highways truncated PA 371 back to the intersection with PA 171 in Union Dale, further east in Susquehanna County.

In April 1961, PA 848 was designated from Gibson to New Milford as part of the construction of I-81 to make sure interchanges were with numbered routes. The rest of the alignment was designated part of PA 374 from Lyon Street (west of Union Dale) to Union Dale. The rest was later designated Township Road 945 from Gibson to PA 92 intersection and SR 2034 from PA 92 to PA 374.

== Major intersections ==
The entire route is in Susquehanna County.

Location	mi	km	Destinations	Notes
New Milford	0.000	0.000	US 11 (Main Street) to PA 492 east	Western terminus of PA 848
New Milford Township	4.394	7.071	I-81 – Scranton, Binghamton	Exit 219 (I-81); southbound ramps via SR 2081 (Oliver Road) only
Gibson Township	6.664	10.725	PA 547 (Harford Street)	Eastern terminus of PA 848; Village of Gibson
1.000 mi = 1.609 km; 1.000 km = 0.621 mi

== PA 848 Truck ==
Pennsylvania Route 848 Truck
- Location: Susquehanna County
- Existed: 2013–2016

Pennsylvania Route 848 Truck was a truck route of PA 848 bypassing a weight-restricted bridge over a branch of Butler Creek in Gibson Township, on which trucks over 27 tons and combination loads over 36 tons were prohibited. It followed I-81 and PA 547. The route was signed in 2013. The bridge was reconstructed in 2016, effectively deleting the route.

== See also ==
- Newburgh and Cochecton Turnpike
