= Page Lake =

Page Lake may refer to:

- Page Lake (Minnesota)
- Page Lake (Pennsylvania)
