= Pennsylvania Route 547 =

State highway in Susquehanna County, Pennsylvania, US

Pennsylvania Route 547

Route information
- Maintained by PennDOT
- Length: 11.000 mi (17.703 km)
- Existed: 1928–present

Major junctions
- South end: US 11 in Harford Township
- I-81 in Harford Township
- North end: PA 492 in Jackson Township

Location
- Country: United States
- State: Pennsylvania
- Counties: Susquehanna

Highway system
- Pennsylvania State Route System; Interstate; US; State; Scenic; Legislative
| ← PA 546 | → PA 549 |

Pennsylvania Route 547 (PA 547) is an 11-mile-long (18 km) state highway located in Susquehanna County, Pennsylvania. The southern terminus is at U.S. Route 11 (US 11) in Harford Township. The northern terminus is at PA 492 in Jackson Township.

== Route description ==
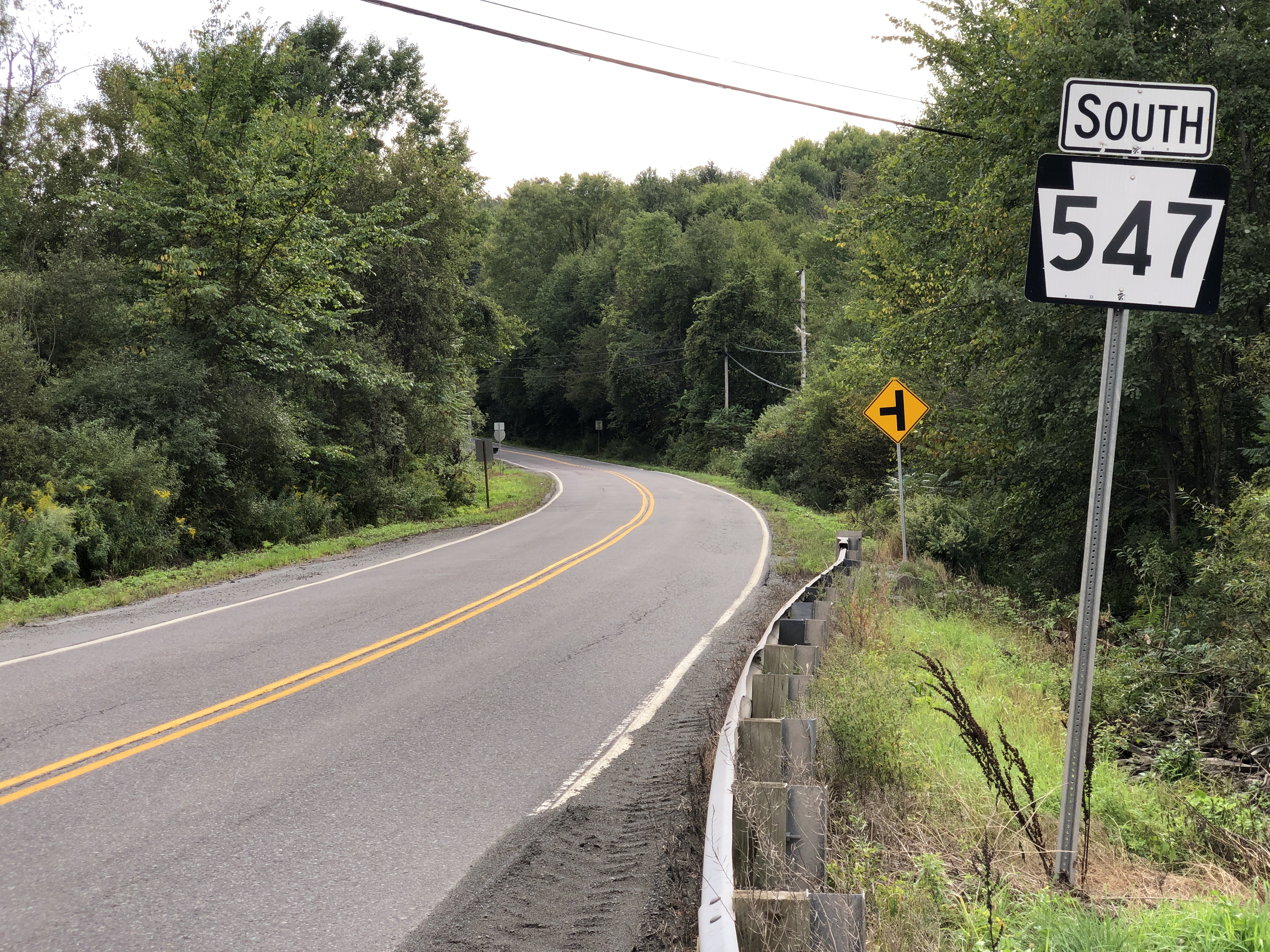
PA 547 southbound past I-81 in Harford Township

PA 547 begins at a fork in the road from US 11 in the community of Kingsley, a portion of Harford Township. The highway heads northward through forestry and parallels Stephens Avenue. The route, heading northward through the hills, makes a gradual curve and turns to the southeast and until the intersection with Appleman Road, remains rural. At Appleman Road, PA 547 turns eastward along the right-of-way continues through fields. The road, designated the Senator Ed Jones Highway, goes through Harford Township and turns northeastward, passing ponds along the side of the highway. As the road curves to the north, it parallels and intersects with Creek Road, a local road, and enters the downtown portion of Harford. PA 547 gains the name of Main Street and turning to the northeast through the residential area of Harford. At Fair Hill Road, PA 547 turns off Main Street and leaves Harford. The route heads eastward through a rural farms and turn northeast into an interchange with Exit 217 of Interstate 81 (I-81).

After the interchange with I-81, PA 547 winds to the northeast through forests and fields before the intersection with Goff Road, a sporadic stretch of homes appears. The route turns to the northeast, winding through Gibson Township and into the village of Gibson. In downtown Gibson, PA 547 is unnamed, intersecting with the eastern terminus of PA 848. At PA 848, PA 547 continues on the eastward right-of-way, forking to the north at an intersection with the Old Newburgh Turnpike. Heading north out of Gibson, PA 547 becomes predominantly rural, with a large mix of forests and fields surrounding the highways. Turning to the northeast slightly, the route passes some local houses. PA 547 enters Jackson Township and terminates at an intersection with PA 492. The right-of-way of PA 547 continues north as State Route 1019.

== Major intersections ==
The entire route is in Susquehanna County.

| Location | mi | km | Destinations | Notes |
|---|---|---|---|---|
| Harford Township | 0.000 | 0.000 | US 11 – Nicholson, New Milford | Southern terminus |
| Harford Township | 5.022 | 8.082 | I-81 – Scranton, Binghamton | Exit 217 (I-81) |
| Gibson Township | 7.422 | 11.945 | PA 848 west – New Milford | Eastern terminus of PA 848 |
| Jackson Township | 11.000 | 17.703 | PA 492 / SR 1019 – Jackson, New Milford, Susquehanna | Northern terminus |
1.000 mi = 1.609 km; 1.000 km = 0.621 mi
