= Salt Lick Creek (Susquehanna River tributary) =

River in the United States of America

Coordinates: 41.96286°N 75.73935°W

Salt Lick Creek is an 11.1-mile-long (17.9 km) tributary of the Susquehanna River in Susquehanna County, Pennsylvania in the United States.

Salt Lick Creek rises at the outlet of Page Lake at the village of Lakeside in New Milford Township and flows northwest to the borough of New Milford, then turns north and joins the Susquehanna at the borough of Hallstead. Interstate 81 and U.S. Route 11 follow the creek from New Milford to the Susquehanna River.

This north-flowing section of Salt Lick Creek follows the "Summit Sluiceway", a gently-sloping 24-mile long channel formed by glacial erosion during the Pleistocene epoch. On the other side of New Milford, Martins Creek follows the Summit Sluiceway south into Tunkhannock Creek.

== See also ==
- List of rivers of Pennsylvania
