= Pennsylvania Route 492 =

State highway in Susquehanna County, Pennsylvania, US

Pennsylvania Route 492
- PA 492 highlighted in red

Route information
- Maintained by PennDOT
- Existed: 1928–present

Major junctions
- West end: US 11 in New Milford
- I-81 in New Milford; PA 547 in Jackson Township
- East end: PA 92 in Jackson Township

Location
- Country: United States
- State: Pennsylvania
- Counties: Susquehanna

Highway system
- Pennsylvania State Route System; Interstate; US; State; Scenic; Legislative
| ← PA 491 | → I-495 |

Pennsylvania Route 492 (PA 492, designated by the Pennsylvania Department of Transportation as SR 492) is an 8.19-mile-long (13.18 km) state highway located in Susquehanna County, Pennsylvania. The western terminus is at U.S. Route 11 (US 11) in New Milford. The eastern terminus is at PA 92 in Jackson Township.

== Route description ==
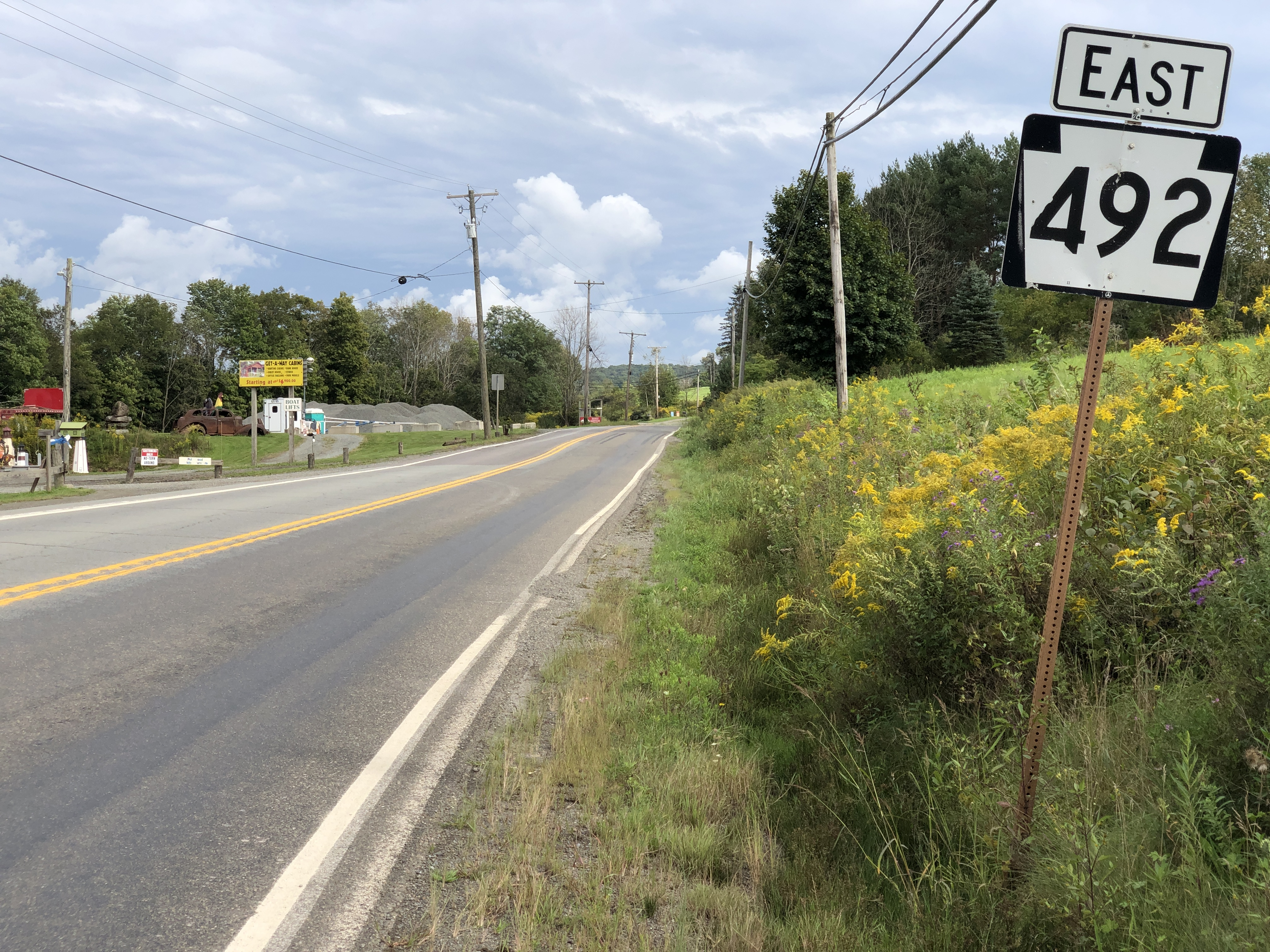
PA 492 eastbound past I-81 in New Milford

PA 492 begins at an intersection with US 11 (Main Street) in the borough of New Milford. PA 492 heads eastward as Jackson Street, passing several residences and a local ball field before turning southeastward off of Jackson Street into Exit 223 of Interstate 81. After the interchange, PA 492 turns southeastward again, paralleling the interstate through fields and residences before intersecting with State Route 1012 (SR 1012, East Lake Road) in New Milford. PA 492 turns eastward through forestry before turning northeastward just before Township Road 688 (TR 688).

After the intersection with TR 627, PA 492 makes a gradual curve and enters the hamlet of Lakeside. In Lakeside, the highway passes several residences and to the south of Page Lake. After leaving Lakeside, PA 492 heads eastward through fields before intersecting with the northern terminus of PA 547 and the southern terminus of SR 1019. PA 492 continues on its southeastern progression until turning off at Swistro Road, where it turns to the northeast. PA 492 continues through the hamlet of Jackson, where the designation terminates at an intersection with PA 92.

== Major intersections ==
The entire route is in Susquehanna County.

| Location | mi | km | Destinations | Notes |
|---|---|---|---|---|
| New Milford | 0.000 | 0.000 | US 11 (Main Street) – Montrose, Kingsley, Hallstead | Western terminus |
| New Milford | 0.583– 0.605 | 0.938– 0.974 | I-81 – Scranton, Binghamton | Exit 223 (I-81); partial cloverleaf interchange |
| Jackson Township | 5.446 | 8.764 | PA 547 south / SR 1019 – Gibson | Northern terminus of PA 547 |
| Jackson Township | 8.189 | 13.179 | PA 92 – Susquehanna, Nicholson | Eastern terminus |
1.000 mi = 1.609 km; 1.000 km = 0.621 mi
