= Penn Township, Cumberland County, Pennsylvania =

Township in Pennsylvania, US

Coordinates: 40°07′00″N 77°22′59″W

- Township
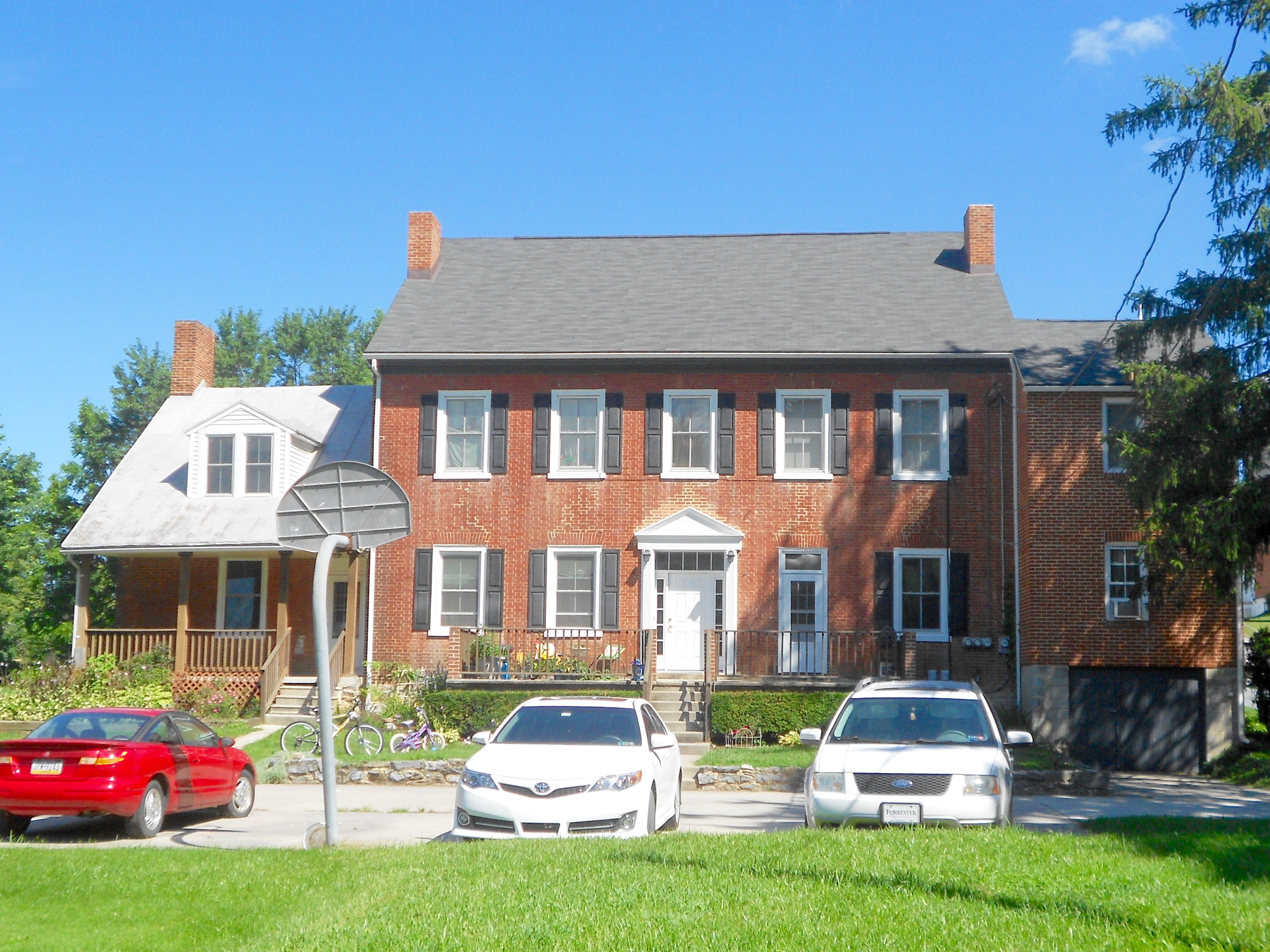
- 1805 Walnut Bottom Road

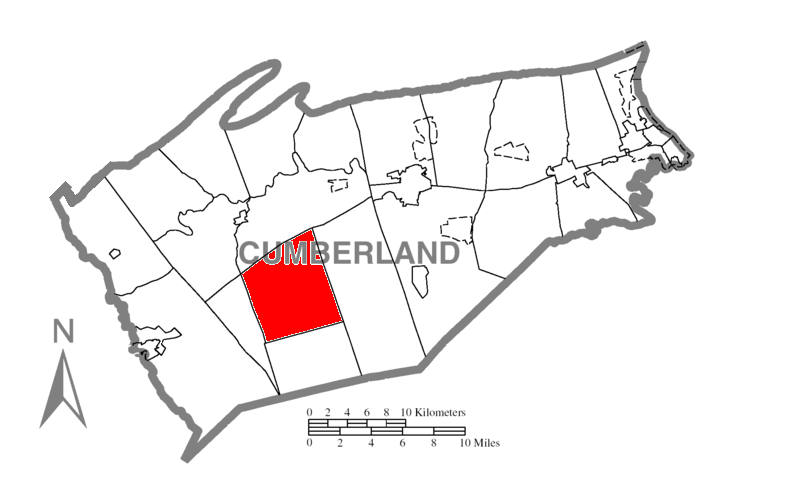
- Map of Cumberland County, Pennsylvania highlighting Penn Township

- Map of Cumberland County, Pennsylvania
- Country: United States
- State: Pennsylvania
- County: Cumberland

Government
  - Type: Board of Supervisors

Area
  - Total: 29.63 sq mi (76.75 km^{2})
  - Land: 29.56 sq mi (76.57 km^{2})
  - Water: 0.069 sq mi (0.18 km^{2})

Population (2010)
  - Total: 2,924
  - Estimate (2016): 2,977
  - Density: 100.7/sq mi (38.88/km^{2})
- Time zone: UTC-5 (Eastern (EST))
  - Summer (DST): UTC-4 (EDT)
- Area code: 717
- FIPS code: 42-041-58824
- Website: penntwpcc.org

Historical population
Census	Pop.	Note	%±
2000	2,807		—
2010	2,924		4.2%
2016 (est.)	2,977		1.8%
U.S. Decennial Census

Penn Township is a township in Cumberland County, Pennsylvania, United States, established on October 23, 1860, from Upper Dickinson Township. The population was 2,924 at the 2010 census.

== Geography ==
Penn Township is in west-central Cumberland County. The northern two-third of the township is in the Cumberland Valley, while the southern third extends up the slopes of South Mountain. Yellow Breeches Creek, a tributary of the Susquehanna River, flows from west to east across the center of the township.

U.S. Route 11 forms the northern border of the township, and Interstate 81 runs parallel to it across the northern part of the township, with access from Exit 37 (Pennsylvania Route 233). The township contains the unincorporated communities of Centerville, Cumminstown, Hockersville, Hays Grove, Longsdorf, Huntsdale, Brushtown, and Cobblesville.

According to the United States Census Bureau, the township has a total area of 29.7 square miles (76.8 km^{2}), of which 29.6 square miles (76.6 km^{2}) is land and 0.1 square miles (0.2 km^{2}), or 0.23%, is water.

== Demographics ==
As of the census of 2000, there were 2,807 people, 974 households, and 772 families residing in the township. The population density was 96.1 inhabitants per square mile (37.1/km^{2}). There were 996 housing units at an average density of 34.1 per square mile (13.2/km^{2}). The racial makeup of the township was 97.93% White, 0.25% African American, 0.29% Native American, 0.25% Asian, 0.04% Pacific Islander, 0.46% from other races, and 0.78% from two or more races. Hispanic or Latino of any race were 0.71% of the population.

There were 974 households, out of which 36.1% had children under the age of 18 living with them, 68.5% were married couples living together, 5.9% had a female householder with no husband present, and 20.7% were non-families. 16.0% of all households were made up of individuals, and 5.1% had someone living alone who was 65 years of age or older. The average household size was 2.82 and the average family size was 3.17.

In the township, the population was spread out, with 26.7% under the age of 18, 7.3% from 18 to 24, 30.5% from 25 to 44, 25.1% from 45 to 64, and 10.3% who were 65 years of age or older. The median age was 37 years. For every 100 females, there were 100.6 males. For every 100 females age 18 and over, there were 101.9 males.

The median income for a household in the township was $47,188, and the median income for a family was $49,840. Males had a median income of $31,556 versus $22,213 for females. The per capita income for the township was $18,254. About 2.7% of families and 4.4% of the population were below the poverty line, including 5.7% of those under age 18 and 2.0% of those age 65 or over.
