= Jackson, Pennsylvania =

Unincorporated community in Pennsylvania, US

- Unincorporated community
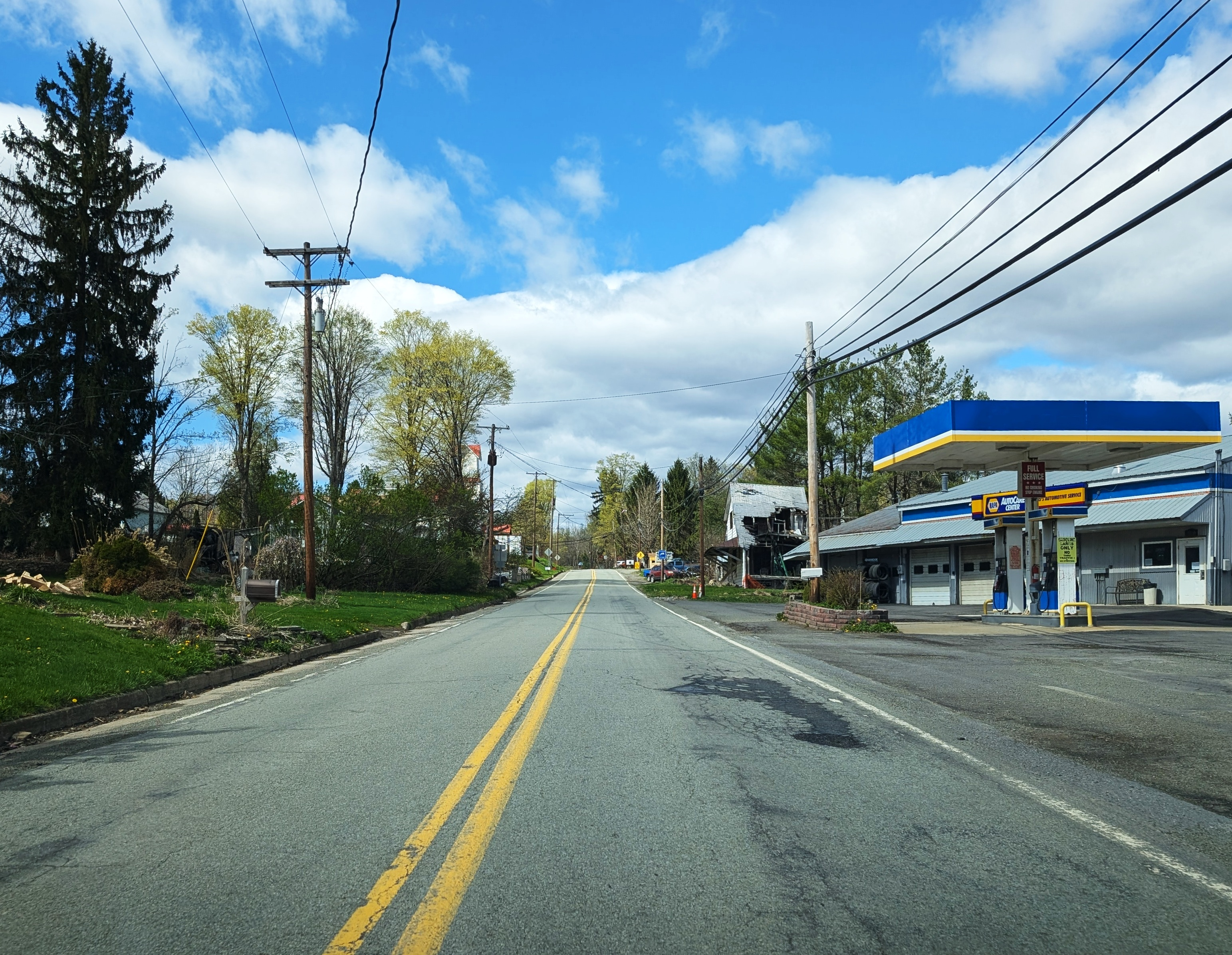
- PA 92 northbound in Jackson

- Location within Pennsylvania
- Coordinates: 41°50′17″N 75°35′27″W
- Country: United States
- State: Pennsylvania
- County: Susquehanna
- Elevation: 1,355 ft (413 m)
- Time zone: UTC-5 (Eastern (EST))
  - Summer (DST): UTC-4 (EDT)
- ZIP code: 18825
- Area codes: 272 & 570
- GNIS feature ID: 1177910

Jackson is an unincorporated community in Susquehanna County, Pennsylvania, United States. The community is located at the intersection of state routes 92 and 492, 7.3 miles (11.7 km) south of Susquehanna Depot. Jackson has a post office with ZIP code 18825.
