= State Line, Franklin County, Pennsylvania =

Unincorporated community in Pennsylvania, US

- Census-designated place
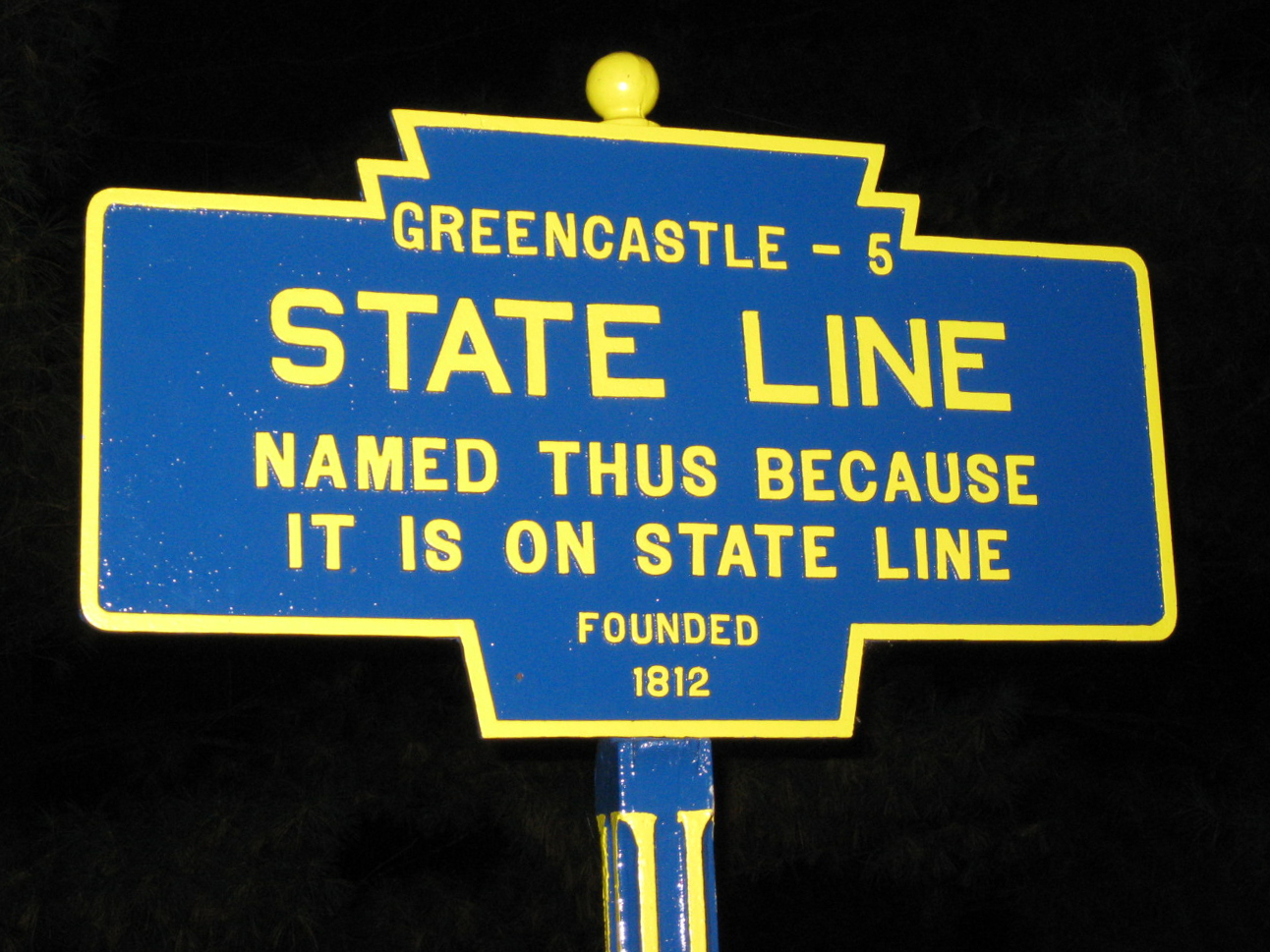
- Keystone Marker

- Location within Pennsylvania Location within the United States
- Coordinates: 39°44′30″N 77°43′30″W
- Country: United States
- State: Pennsylvania
- County: Franklin
- Township: Antrim
- Elevation: 676 ft (206 m)

Population (2020)
  - Total: 2,804
  - Density: 990/sq mi (382/km^{2})
- Time zone: UTC-5 (Eastern (EST))
  - Summer (DST): UTC-4 (EDT)
- ZIP code: 17263
- Area code: 717
- FIPS code: 42-73848
- GNIS feature ID: 2634273

State Line is an unincorporated community and census-designated place (CDP) in Antrim Township, Pennsylvania, United States. It is next to the Maryland state line along Interstate 81 and U.S. Route 11 between Hagerstown, Maryland, and Greencastle. As of the 2020 census the population was 2,804.

State Line was originally called Middleburg, and under the latter name laid out in 1812, and named for its location between Greencastle and Hagerstown, Maryland. The present name comes from the fact that the community is located on the Maryland-Pennsylvania state line. A post office called State Line was established in 1830.
