= Gibson Township, Susquehanna County, Pennsylvania =

Township in Pennsylvania, United States

- Township
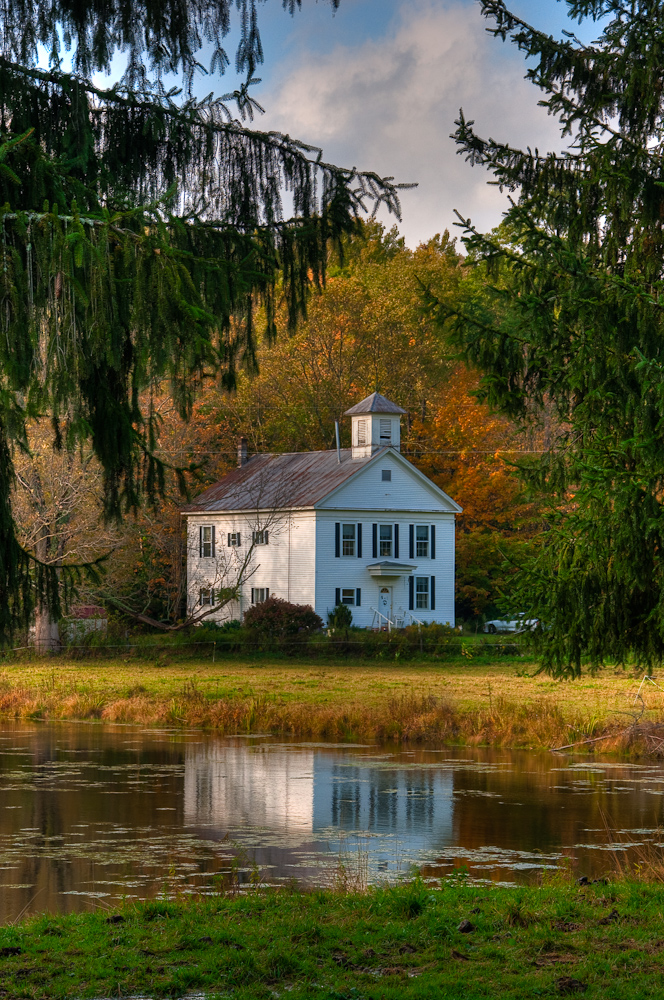
- The old Gibson Schoolhouse

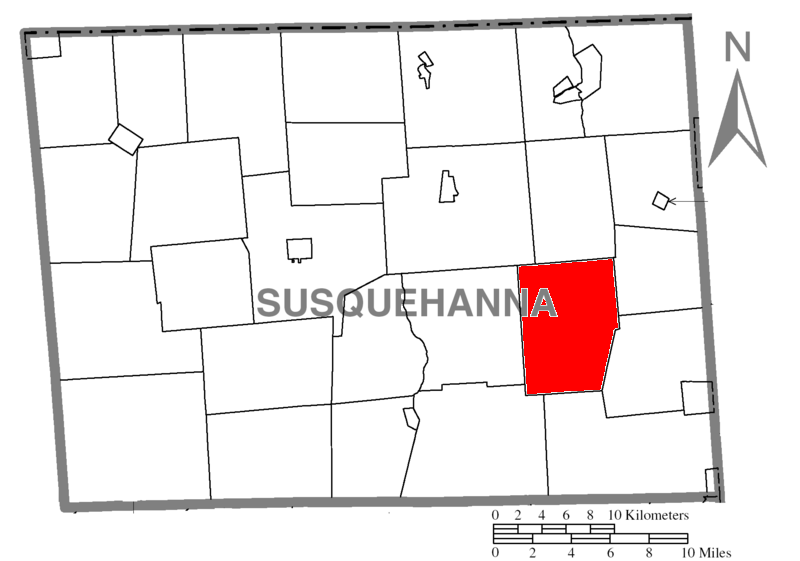

- Location of Pennsylvania in the United States
- Coordinates: 41°44′00″N 75°37′59″W
- Country: United States
- State: Pennsylvania
- County: Susquehanna
- Settled: 1792
- Incorporated: 1812

Area
  - Total: 32.13 sq mi (83.22 km^{2})
  - Land: 31.89 sq mi (82.59 km^{2})
  - Water: 0.24 sq mi (0.62 km^{2})

Population (2020)
  - Total: 1,011 ▼
  - Estimate (2021): 1,008
  - Density: 36.9/sq mi (14.25/km^{2})
- Time zone: UTC-5 (EST)
  - Summer (DST): UTC-4 (EDT)
- ZIP code: 18847
- Area codes: 570 & 272
- FIPS code: 42-115-29024
- Website: https://gibsontownship.com/

Gibson Township is a township in Susquehanna County, Pennsylvania, United States. The population was 1,011 at the 2020 census.

== History ==
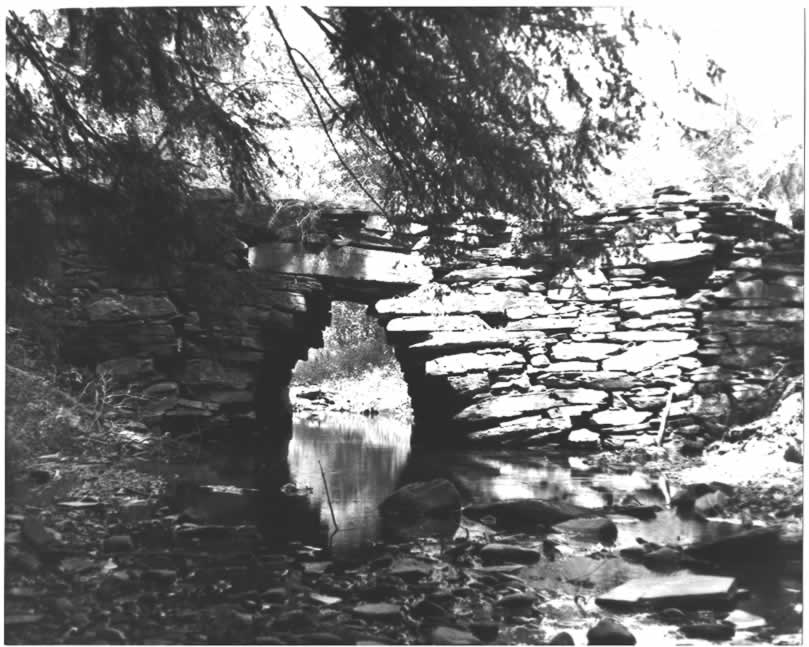
Stone arch bridge in Gibson

Gibson Township was formed from the north part of Clifford Township on November 24, 1813. The new township was named for district president judge Honorable John B. Gibson.

The Gibson Village Historic District consists of about 32 buildings located at routes 848 and 547.

The Bridge in Gibson Borough was added to the National Register of Historic Places in 1988.

== Geography ==
According to the United States Census Bureau, the township has a total area of 32.14 square miles (83.2 km^{2}), of which 31.9 square miles (83 km^{2}) is land and 0.24 square miles (0.62 km^{2}) (0.75%) is water.

Gibson Township is bordered by New Milford, Jackson, Ararat, Herrick, Clifford, Lenox, and Harford townships.

== Communities ==
The following villages are located in Gibson Township:

- Columbia Corners
- Gelatt
- Gibson
- Kentuck Corners
- Palma
- Smiley
- South Gibson
- Union Hill

== Demographics ==
Historical population
Census	Pop.	Note	%±
2010	1,221		—
2020	1,011		−17.2%
2021 (est.)	1,008		−0.3%
U.S. Decennial Census

As of the census of 2010, there were 1,221 people, 481 households, and 351 families residing in the township. The population density was 38.3 people per square mile (14.8 people/km^{2}). There were 644 housing units at an average density of 20.2 per square mile (7.8/km^{2}). The racial makeup of the township was 97.8% White, 0.4% African American, 0.1% Asian, 0.2% from other races, and 1.5% from two or more races. Hispanic or Latino of any race were 2.2% of the population.

There were 481 households, out of which 27.4% had children under the age of 18 living with them, 61.7% were married couples living together, 5.4% had a female householder with no husband present, and 27% were non-families. 22.9% of all households were made up of individuals, and 10.8% had someone living alone who was 65 years of age or older. The average household size was 2.54 and the average family size was 2.94.

In the township the population was spread out, with 21.7% under the age of 18, 61.3% from 18 to 64, and 17% who were 65 years of age or older. The median age was 46 years.

The median income for a household in the township was $46,154, and the median income for a family was $51,146. Males had a median income of $43,750 versus $31,359 for females. The per capita income for the township was $20,202. About 7.2% of families and 10.5% of the population were below the poverty line, including 14.5% of those under age 18 and 11.1% of those age 65 or over.
