= Page Lake (Minnesota) =

Lake in the state of Minnesota, United States

- Location within Minnesota
- Location: Stevens County, Minnesota
- Coordinates: 45°31′20″N 95°47′37″W
- Type: lake

Page Lake is a lake in Stevens County, in the U.S. state of Minnesota.

Page Lake was named for William H. Page, a pioneer who settled near the lake.

== See also ==
- List of lakes in Minnesota
