= Page Lake (Pennsylvania) =

Lake located in Pennsylvania, USA

- Location within Pennsylvania Location within the United States
- Location: New Milford Township, Pennsylvania
- Coordinates: 41°51′28″N 75°39′23″W
- Basin countries: United States
- Surface area: 98 acres (40 ha)
- Average depth: 25 ft (7.6 m)
- Surface elevation: 1,431 ft (436 m)
- Settlements: Lakeside

Page Lake (also known as Page's Pond, Corse's Pond and Lake Page) is a lake that is located in New Milford Township, Pennsylvania, United States. It is approximately 1 mile (1.6 km) long with an average center depth of 25 ft (7.62 m).

== History and notable features ==
Page Lake was created by settler Leonard Corse, who built dams in 1820 and 1830. The dam was again rebuilt after a collapse and flood in 1855. The dam feeds into Salt Lick Creek, a tributary of the Susquehanna River.

Page Lake has been privately owned by the Lakeside Outing Club Inc. since 1922, and is operated as a "residential and vacation community."

On February 15, 2023 several Unidentified Flying Objects were reported by local CBS affiliate WYOU-TV. Captured on cell phone, four small white cylindrical shaped UFOs were seen moving in uniform formation rate of speed. Approximately thirty minutes after the UFOs disappeared several helicopters appeared flying low around the lake.

== See also ==
- List of lakes in Pennsylvania
