= New Milford, Pennsylvania =

Borough in Pennsylvania, US

- Borough
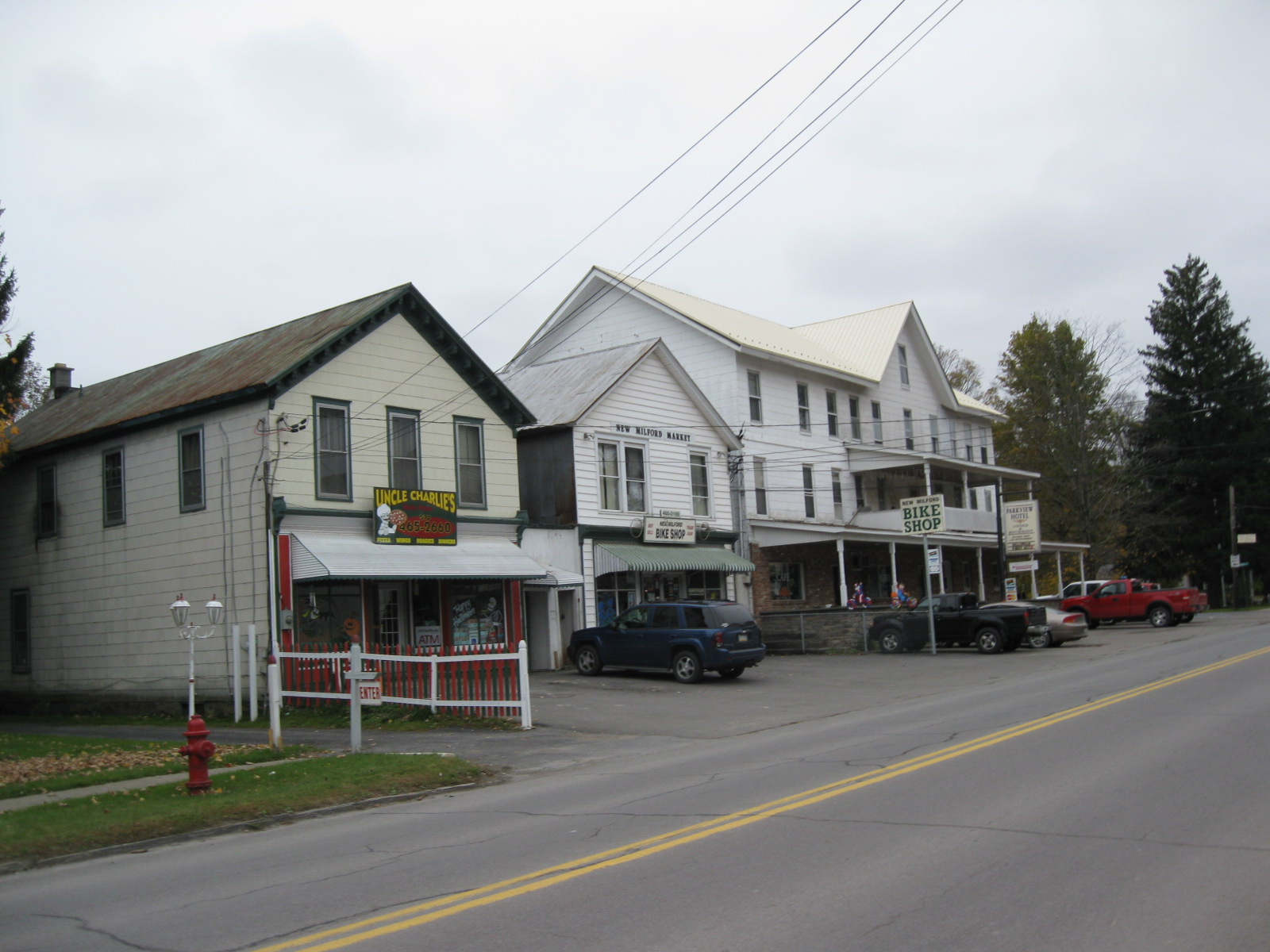
- New Milford, Pennsylvania

- Location of New Milford in Susquehanna County, Pennsylvania.

- Location within Pennsylvania Location within the United States
- Coordinates: 41°52′35″N 75°43′35″W
- Country: United States
- State: Pennsylvania
- County: Susquehanna
- Settled: 1789
- Incorporated: 1859

Government
  - Mayor: Scott Smith

Area
  - Total: 1.02 sq mi (2.63 km^{2})
  - Land: 1.02 sq mi (2.63 km^{2})
  - Water: 0 sq mi (0.00 km^{2})

Population (2020)
  - Total: 812
  - Density: 799.3/sq mi (308.63/km^{2})
- Time zone: UTC-5 (Eastern (EST))
  - Summer (DST): UTC-4 (EDT)
- Zip code: 18834
- Area code: 570
- FIPS code: 42-53880
- Website: https://newmilfordborough.org/

New Milford is a borough in Susquehanna County, Pennsylvania, United States. The population was 817 at the 2020 census. Children living in New Milford are served by the schools in the Blue Ridge School District, including Blue Ridge High School.

== Geography ==
New Milford is located at 41°52′35″N 75°43′35″W.

According to the United States Census Bureau, the borough has a total area of 1.0 square mile (2.6 km^{2}), all land.

== History ==
The borough of New Milford was formed from part of New Milford Township in December 1859.

== Demographics ==
Historical population
Census	Pop.	Note	%±
1860	414		—
1870	600		44.9%
1880	803		33.8%
1890	763		−5.0%
1900	715		−6.3%
1910	654		−8.5%
1920	644		−1.5%
1930	782		21.4%
1940	807		3.2%
1950	880		9.0%
1960	1,129		28.3%
1970	1,143		1.2%
1980	1,040		−9.0%
1990	953		−8.4%
2000	878		−7.9%
2010	868		−1.1%
2020	812		−6.5%
2021 (est.)	814	▲	0.2%

At the 2010 census there were 868 people, 379 households, and 232 families residing in the borough. The population density was 868 people per square mile (335 people/km^{2}). There were 421 housing units at an average density of 421 per square mile (163/km^{2}). The racial makeup of the borough was 97.2% White, 1% African American, 0.2% Asian, 0.8% from other races, and 0.7% from two or more races. Hispanic or Latino of any race were 1.5%.

Of the 379 households, 29.3% had children under the age of 18 living with them, 43.5% were married couples living together, 11.1% had a female householder with no husband present, and 38.8% were non-families. 31.7% of households were one person, and 10.3% were one person aged 65 or older. The average household size was 2.29 and the average family size was 2.85.

In the borough the population was spread out, with 22.4% under the age of 18, 62.2% from 18 to 64, and 15.4% 65 or older. The median age was 40.6 years.

The median household income was $38,611 and the median family income was $50,000. Males had a median income of $40,870 versus $26,071 for females. The per capita income for the borough was $20,067. About 8.3% of families and 11.7% of the population were below the poverty line, including 16.4% of those under age 18 and 3.6% of those age 65 or over.

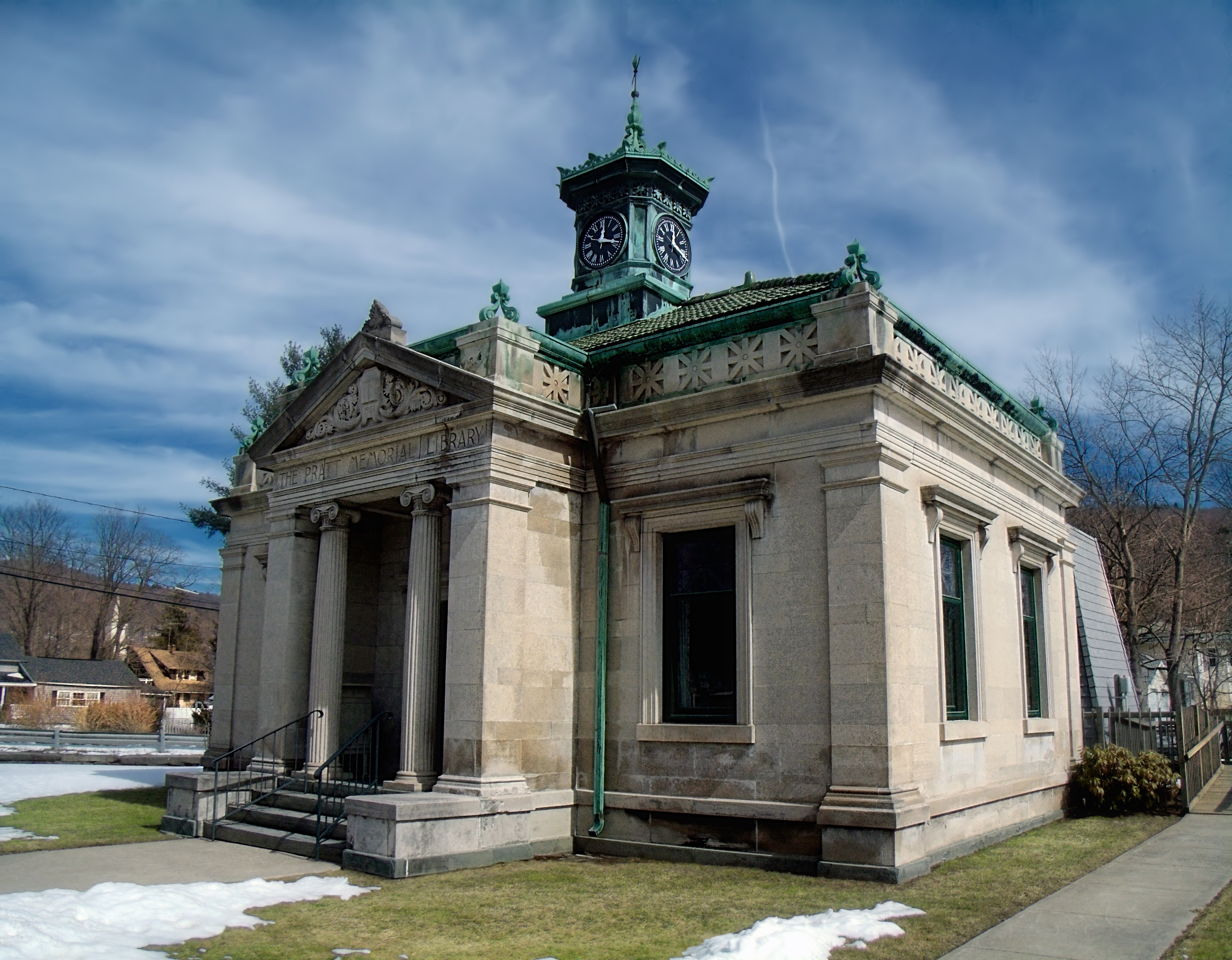
Pratt Memorial Library

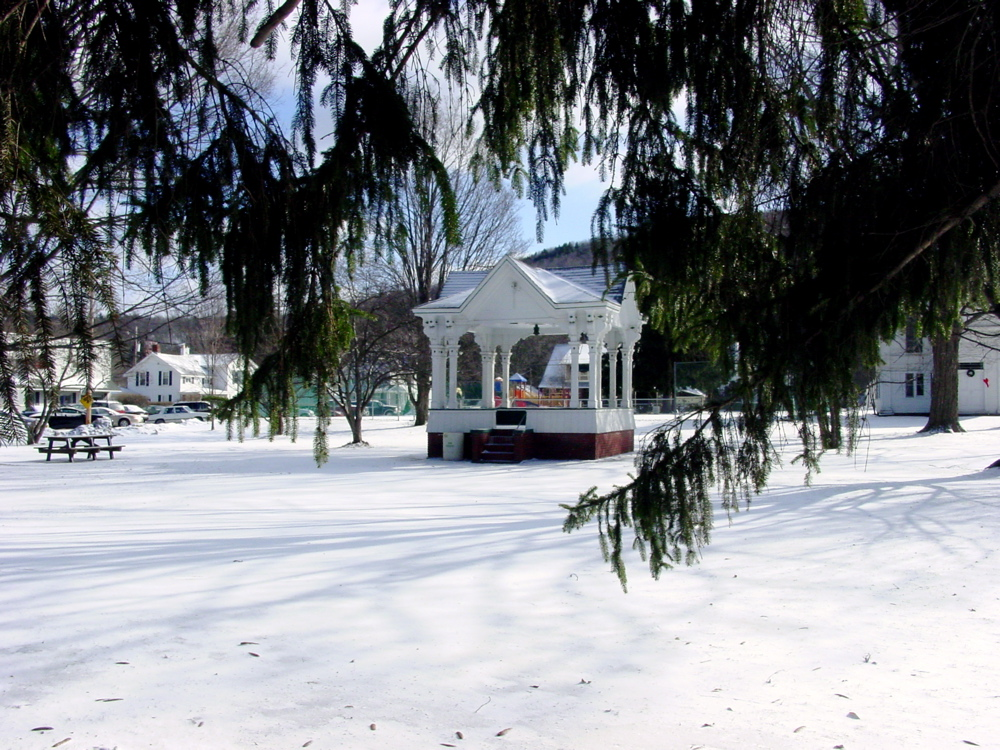
Bandstand in March

== See also ==
- Page Lake
- Pratt Memorial Library
