= New Milford Township, Pennsylvania =

Township in Pennsylvania, United States

- Township
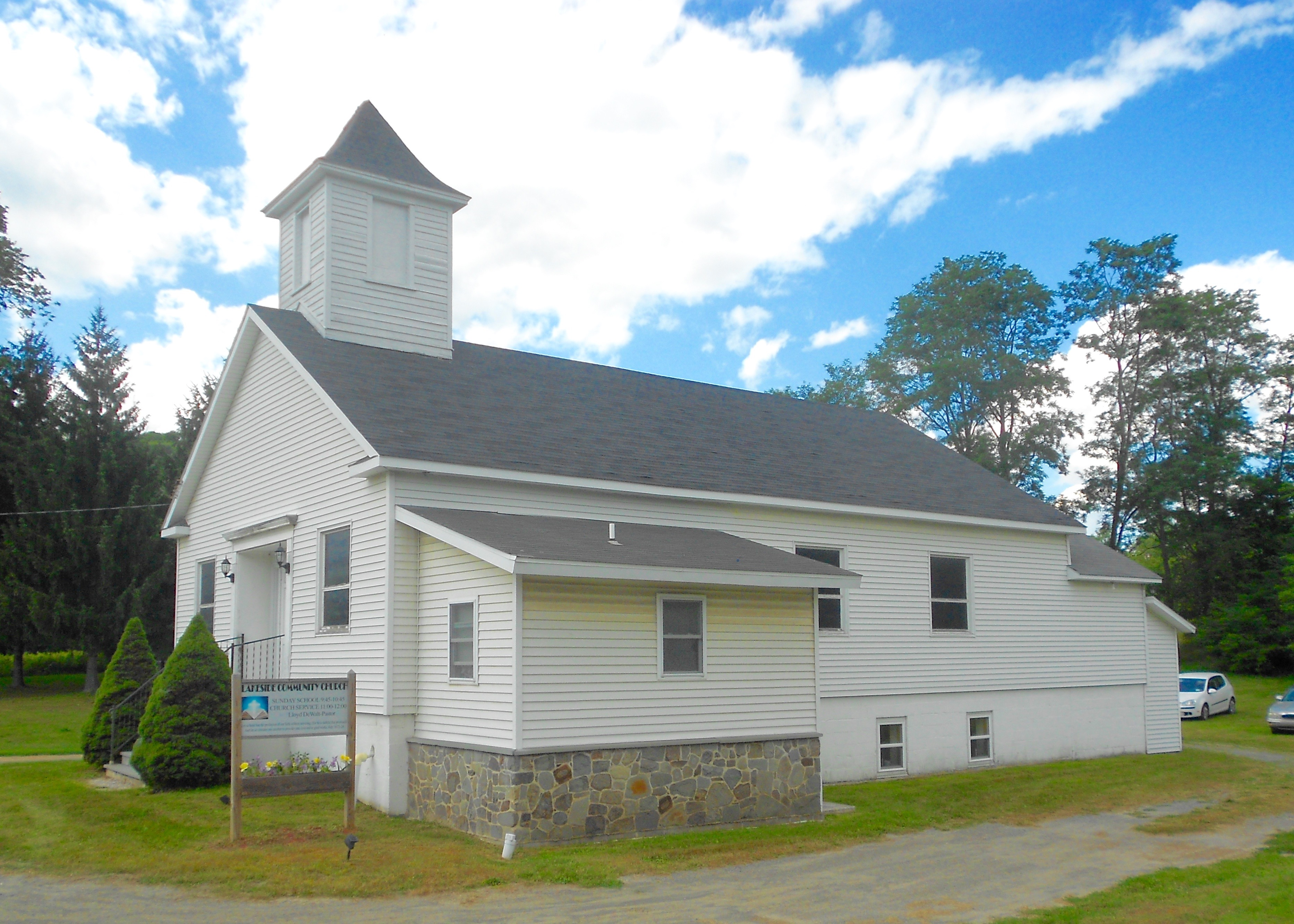
- Lakeside Community Church

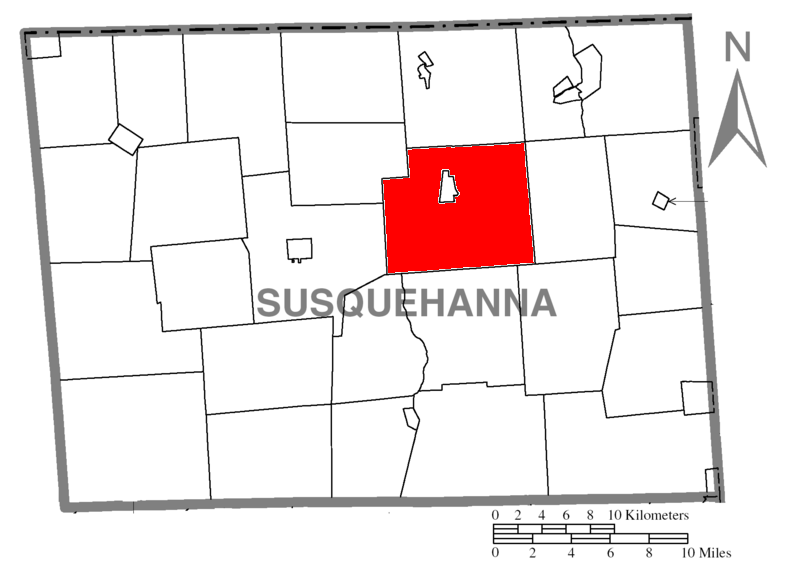

- Location of Pennsylvania in the United States
- Coordinates: 41°51′00″N 75°42′01″W
- Country: United States
- State: Pennsylvania
- County: Susquehanna
- Settled: 1790
- Incorporated: 1807

Area
  - Total: 45.41 sq mi (117.60 km^{2})
  - Land: 44.81 sq mi (116.06 km^{2})
  - Water: 0.60 sq mi (1.55 km^{2})

Population (2020)
  - Total: 1,797 ▼
  - Estimate (2021): 1,798
  - Density: 42.5/sq mi (16.41/km^{2})
- Time zone: UTC-5 (EST)
  - Summer (DST): UTC-4 (EDT)
- ZIP Code: 18834
- Area code: 570
- FIPS code: 42-115-53888

New Milford Township is a township in Susquehanna County, Pennsylvania, United States. The population was 1,797 at the 2020 census. Children living in New Milford Township are served by the schools in the Blue Ridge School District, including Blue Ridge High School.

== Geography ==
According to the United States Census Bureau, the township has a total area of 45.4 square miles (118 km^{2}), of which 44.8 square miles (116 km^{2}) is land and 0.6 square miles (1.6 km^{2}) (1.32%) is water.

== History ==
New Milford Township was formed from Tioga Township in 1807, in what was then the northern part of Luzerne County. In 1859, the borough of New Milford was formed from part of New Milford Township.

== Demographics ==
Historical population
Census	Pop.	Note	%±
2010	2,042		—
2020	1,797		−12.0%
2021 (est.)	1,798		0.1%
U.S. Decennial Census

As of the census of 2010, there were 2,042 people, 834 households, and 593 families residing in the township. The population density was 45.6 people per square mile (17.6 people/km^{2}). There were 1,226 housing units at an average density of 27.4 per square mile (10.6/km^{2}). The racial makeup of the township was 98.5% White, 0.3% African American, 0.2% Native American, 0.15% Asian, 0.15% from other races, and 0.7% from two or more races. Hispanic or Latino of any race were 1% of the population.

There were 834 households, out of which 27.1% had children under the age of 18 living with them, 58.6% were married couples living together, 8.8% had a female householder with no husband present, and 28.9% were non-families. 24.9% of all households were made up of individuals, and 10.1% had someone living alone who was 65 years of age or older. The average household size was 2.45 and the average family size was 2.89.

In the township the population was spread out, with 20.7% under the age of 18, 61.8% from 18 to 64, and 17.5% who were 65 years of age or older. The median age was 46.4 years.

The median income for a household in the township was $47,462, and the median income for a family was $50,350. Males had a median income of $37,107 versus $28,542 for females. The per capita income for the township was $22,574. About 8.4% of families and 11.2% of the population were below the poverty line, including 19.5% of those under age 18 and 16.7% of those age 65 or over.

== Bluestone ==
The New Milford area is dominated by stone quarries. Bluestone is of particular value to not only New Milford Township, but also Susquehanna County.

== See also ==
- Paige Lake, lakeside community within New Milford Twp
