= Great Bend Township, Susquehanna County, Pennsylvania =

Township in Pennsylvania, United States

Great Bend Township, Pennsylvania
- Township
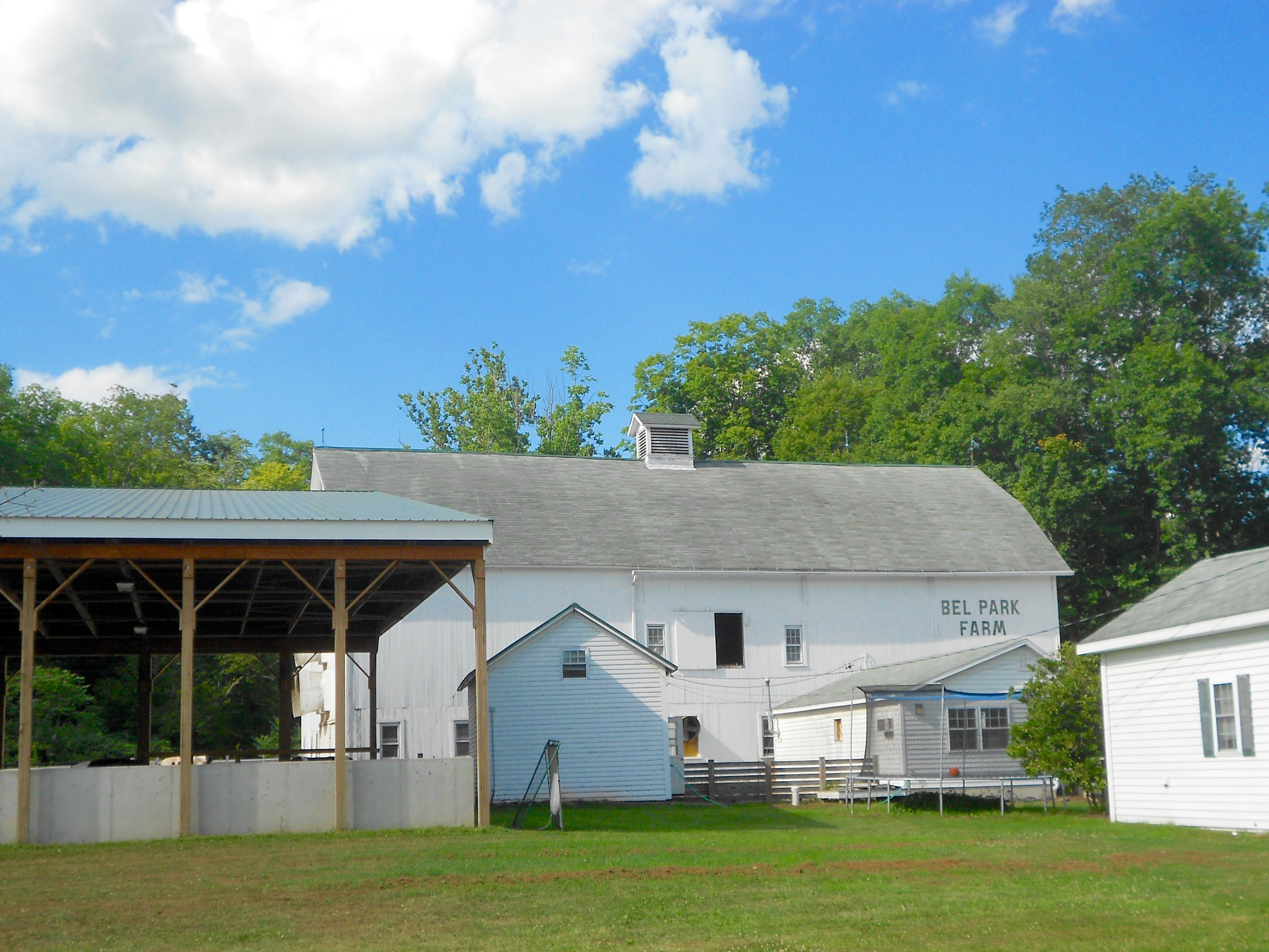
- Bel Park Farm
- Motto(s): Great food, Great people, Great friends...Great Bend
- Location of Pennsylvania in the United States
- Coordinates: 41°57′00″N 75°43′59″W
- Country: United States
- State: Pennsylvania
- County: Susquehanna
- Settled: 1787
- Incorporated: 1791

Area
  - Total: 36.85 sq mi (95.43 km^{2})
  - Land: 36.15 sq mi (93.64 km^{2})
  - Water: 0.69 sq mi (1.79 km^{2})

Population (2020)
  - Total: 1,711 ▼
  - Estimate (2021): 1,708
  - Density: 50.6/sq mi (19.53/km^{2})
- Time zone: UTC-5 (EST)
  - Summer (DST): UTC-4 (EDT)
- Area code: 570
- FIPS code: 42-115-30736

Great Bend Township is a township in Susquehanna County, Pennsylvania, United States. The population was 1,711 at the 2020 census. Children living in the township are served by the public schools in the Blue Ridge School District, including Blue Ridge High School.

== History ==
What is now Great Bend Township was incorporated as Willingborough Township in March 1791, when Susquehanna County was still part of Luzerne County. It was renamed to Great Bend Township on November 28, 1814. The present name comes from a meander in the Susquehanna River.

Great Bend Borough was incorporated from part of Great Bend Township in 1861 and Hallstead Borough was similarly formed in 1874.

The Presidential Motorcade passed through Great Bend on August 23, 2013. President Barack Obama was traveling from Binghamton, New York to Scranton during his tour to promote programs to aid college students.

== Geography ==
According to the United States Census Bureau, the township has a total area of 36.85 square miles (95.4 km^{2}), of which 36.1 square miles (93 km^{2}) is land and 0.75 square miles (1.9 km^{2}) (2.04%) is water.

== Demographics ==
Historical population
Census	Pop.	Note	%±
2010	1,949		—
2020	1,711		−12.2%
2021 (est.)	1,708		−0.2%
U.S. Decennial Census

As of the census of 2010, there were 1,949 people, 790 households, and 554 families residing in the township. The population density was 54 people per square mile (20.8/km^{2}). There were 878 housing units at an average density of 24.3/sq mi (9.5/km^{2}). The racial makeup of the township was 97.7% White, 0.6% African American, 0.2% Asian, 0.1% Pacific Islander, 0.5% from other races, and 0.9% from two or more races. Hispanic or Latino of any race were 1.3% of the population.

There were 790 households, out of which 27.6% had children under the age of 18 living with them, 53.2% were married couples living together, 10.8% had a female householder with no husband present, and 29.9% were non-families. 23.4% of all households were made up of individuals, and 9.4% had someone living alone who was 65 years of age or older. The average household size was 2.47 and the average family size was 2.88.

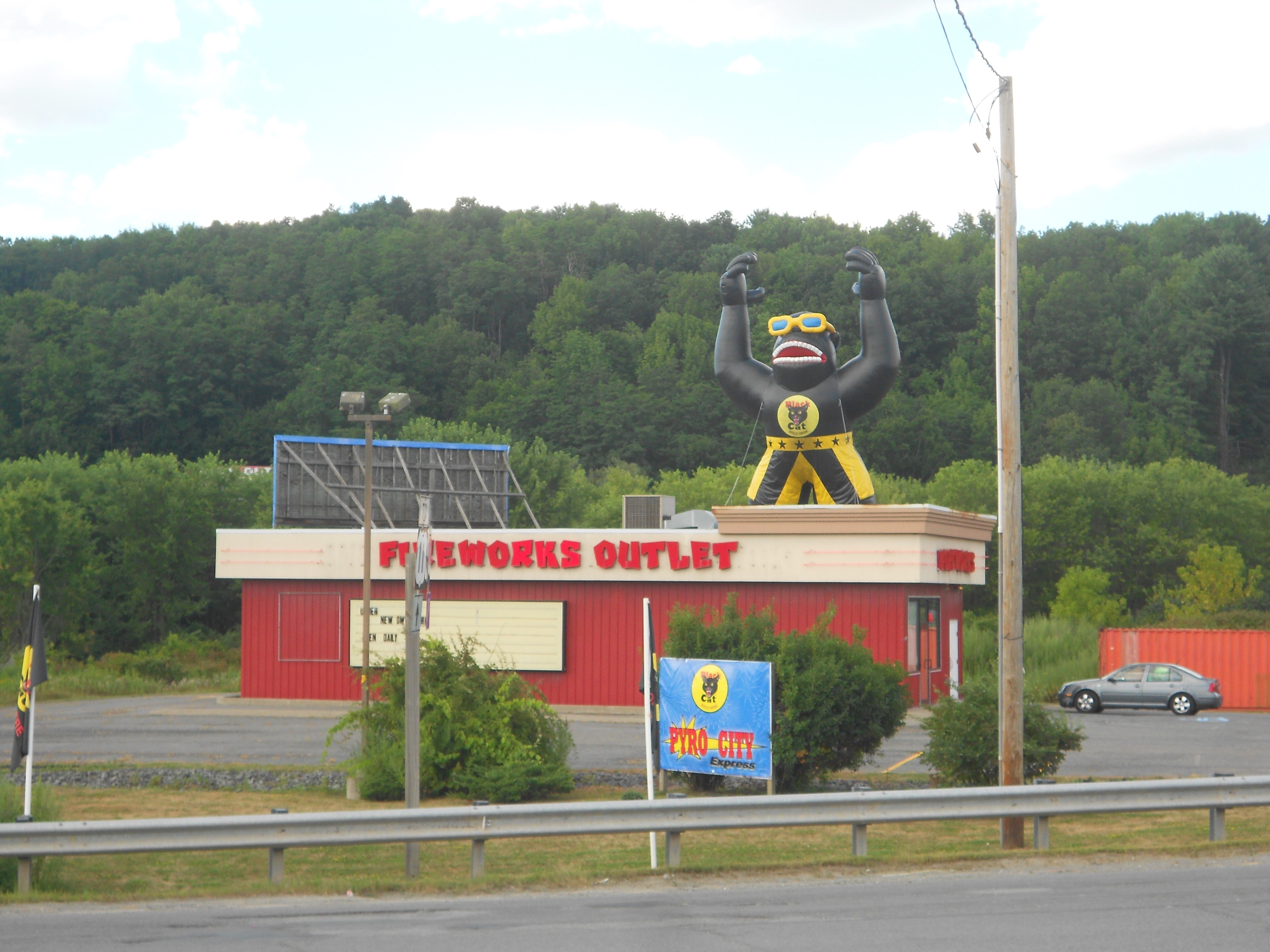
Fireworks store

In the township the population was spread out, with 21.3% under the age of 18, 62.7% from 18 to 64, and 16% who were 65 years of age or older. The median age was 43 years.

The median income for a household in the township was $37,134, and the median income for a family was $50,966. Males had a median income of $33,542 versus $28,750 for females. The per capita income for the township was $21,151. About 9% of families and 11.2% of the population were below the poverty line, including 11.9% of those under age 18 and 5.2% of those age 65 or over.
