= Simeon B. Chase =

American politician

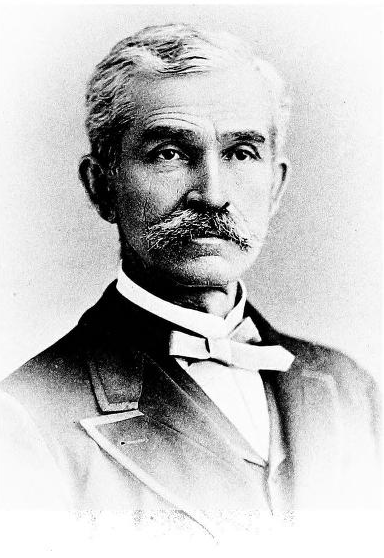

2nd Chairman of the Prohibition Party
- In office 1872–1876
- Preceded by: John Russell
- Succeeded by: James Black

Member of the Pennsylvania House of Representatives
- In office 1857–1861

Personal details
- Born: Simeon Brewster Chase; April 18, 1828 Gibson, Pennsylvania, U.S.
- Died: January 9, 1909 (aged 80) Hallstead, Pennsylvania, U.S.
- Party: Prohibition (1869–1909)
- Other political affiliations: Republican (1856–1869); Democratic Party (before 1856)
- Spouse: Fanny DuBois (m. 1851; died 1902)
- Children: 4
- Parents: Amasa Chase (father); Sarah Guile (mother)
- Education: Hamilton College

Simeon Brewster Chase (April 18, 1828 – January 9, 1909) was an American politician who served in the Pennsylvania House of Representatives and was active in the Prohibition Party.

== Life ==
Simeon Brewster Chase was born on April 18, 1828, to Amasa Chase and Sarah Guile in Gibson, Pennsylvania. In 1851, he graduated from Hamilton College with a law degree and later married Fanny DuBois. In 1851, he and Ezra Chase, who later served as the Speaker of the Pennsylvania House of Representatives, purchase the Montrose Democrat and served as an editor for the paper until he left the Democratic Party in 1856 to join the Republican.

In 1856, he served as the chairman of the Susquehanna County Republican Convention and later served in the state House of Representatives from 1857 to 1861. In 1869, he served as one of the founding members of the Prohibition Party and served as the president of the party's first national convention in 1872.

In 1872, he received the Prohibition gubernatorial nomination, ran for Pennsylvania Supreme Court in 1878, and ran for the House of Representatives in 1878, 1886, 1888, and 1892.

Chase died on January 9, 1909.

== Electoral history ==
Simeon B. Chase electoral history

1872 Pennsylvania gubernatorial election
Party	Candidate	Votes	%	±%
Republican	John F. Hartranft	353,287	52.55%	+2.15%
Democratic	Charles R. Buckalew	317,700	47.26%	−2.34%
Prohibition	Simeon B. Chase	1,250	0.19%	+0.19%
Independent	Winthrop W. Ketchum (write-in)	1	0.00%	+0.00%
Total votes		672,238	100.00%	

1878 Pennsylvania Fifteenth Congressional district election
Party	Candidate	Votes	%	±%
Republican	Edward Overton Jr. (incumbent)	13,160	49.21%	−3.93%
Greenback	DeWitt C. DeWitt	9,320	34.85%	+34.85%
Democratic	William H. Dimmick	3,783	14.15%	−32.71%
Prohibition	Simeon B. Chase	482	1.80%	+1.80%
Total votes		26,745	100.00%	

1884 Pennsylvania Tenth Congressional district election
Party	Candidate	Votes	%	±%
Democratic	William Henry Sowden (incumbent)	21,370	96.83%	+37.66%
Prohibition	Simeon B. Chase	699	3.17%	+3.17%
Total votes		22,069	100.00%	
