= Chamber of Horrors =

Chamber of Horrors may refer to:

- Chamber of Horrors (1929 film), a 1929 British silent film directed by Walter Summers
- The Door with Seven Locks (1940 film), a 1940 black-and-white British film, released in the United States as Chamber of Horrors
- Chamber of Horrors (1966 film), a 1966 horror film directed by Hy Averback
- Chamber of Horrors (Madame Tussauds), famous for its waxworks of executed criminals and notorious persons
- Chamber of Horrors (FDA) (Ruth deForest Lamb)

== See also ==
- House of Horrors, a 1946 American horror film starring Rondo Hatton as "the Creeper"
