= Thompson, Pennsylvania =

Borough in Pennsylvania, US

- Borough
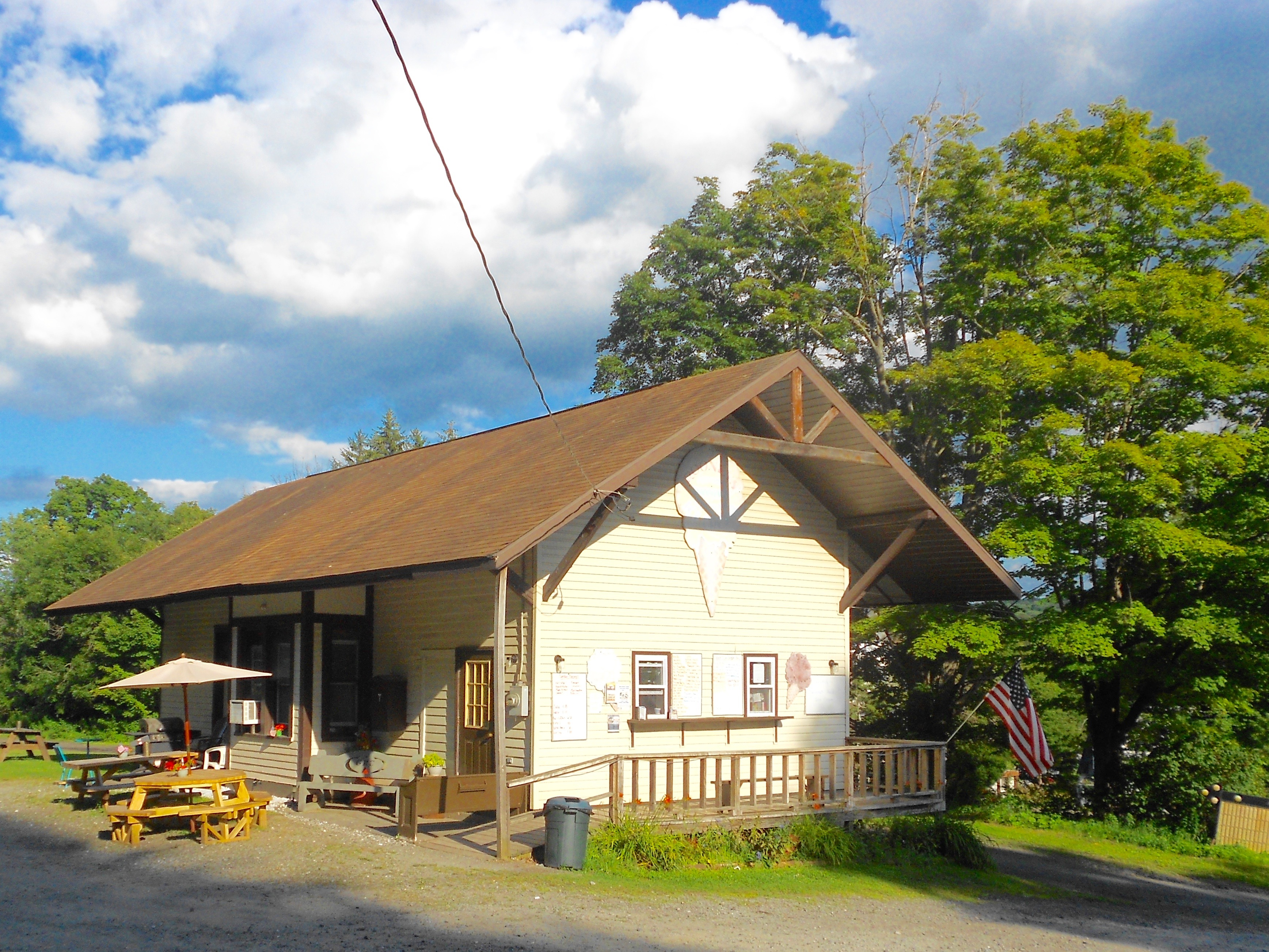
- Ice cream store in the old railroad station

- Location of Thompson in Susquehanna County, Pennsylvania.

- Location within Pennsylvania Location within the United States
- Coordinates: 41°51′44″N 75°30′57″W
- Country: United States
- State: Pennsylvania
- County: Susquehanna
- Incorporated: 1876

Government
  - Mayor: Jeffry Sheldon

Area
  - Total: 0.51 sq mi (1.33 km^{2})
  - Land: 0.51 sq mi (1.33 km^{2})
  - Water: 0 sq mi (0.00 km^{2})

Population (2020)
  - Total: 255 ▼
  - Estimate (2021): 254
  - Density: 525.3/sq mi (202.83/km^{2})
- Time zone: UTC-5 (Eastern (EST))
  - Summer (DST): UTC-4 (EDT)
- Zip code: 18465
- Area code: 570
- FIPS code: 42-76496

Thompson is a borough in Susquehanna County, Pennsylvania, United States. The population was 255 at the 2020 census.

== Geography ==
Thompson is located at 41°51′44″N 75°30′57″W (41.862354, -75.515864).

According to the United States Census Bureau, the borough has a total area of 0.5 square miles (1.3 km^{2}), all land.

== History ==
Thompson Borough was incorporated on August 15, 1876 from part of Thompson Township. Both were named after Susquehanna County associate judge William Thompson.

The Spencer Milling Company gristmill was built on Jackson Street by G. Fenton Spencer in 1870.

== Demographics ==
Historical population
Census	Pop.	Note	%±
1880	249		—
1890	302		21.3%
1900	309		2.3%
1910	322		4.2%
1920	295		−8.4%
1930	321		8.8%
1940	339		5.6%
1950	320		−5.6%
1960	286		−10.6%
1970	307		7.3%
1980	303		−1.3%
1990	291		−4.0%
2000	299		2.7%
2010	299		0.0%
2020	254		−15.1%
2021 (est.)	254	Steady	0.0%

At the 2010 census there were 299 people, 126 households, and 78 families residing in the borough. The population density was 598 inhabitants per square mile (231/km^{2}). There were 163 housing units at an average density of 326 per square mile (126/km^{2}). The racial makeup of the borough was 98.7% White, 0.3% African American, and 1% from two or more races. Hispanic or Latino of any race were 0.7%.

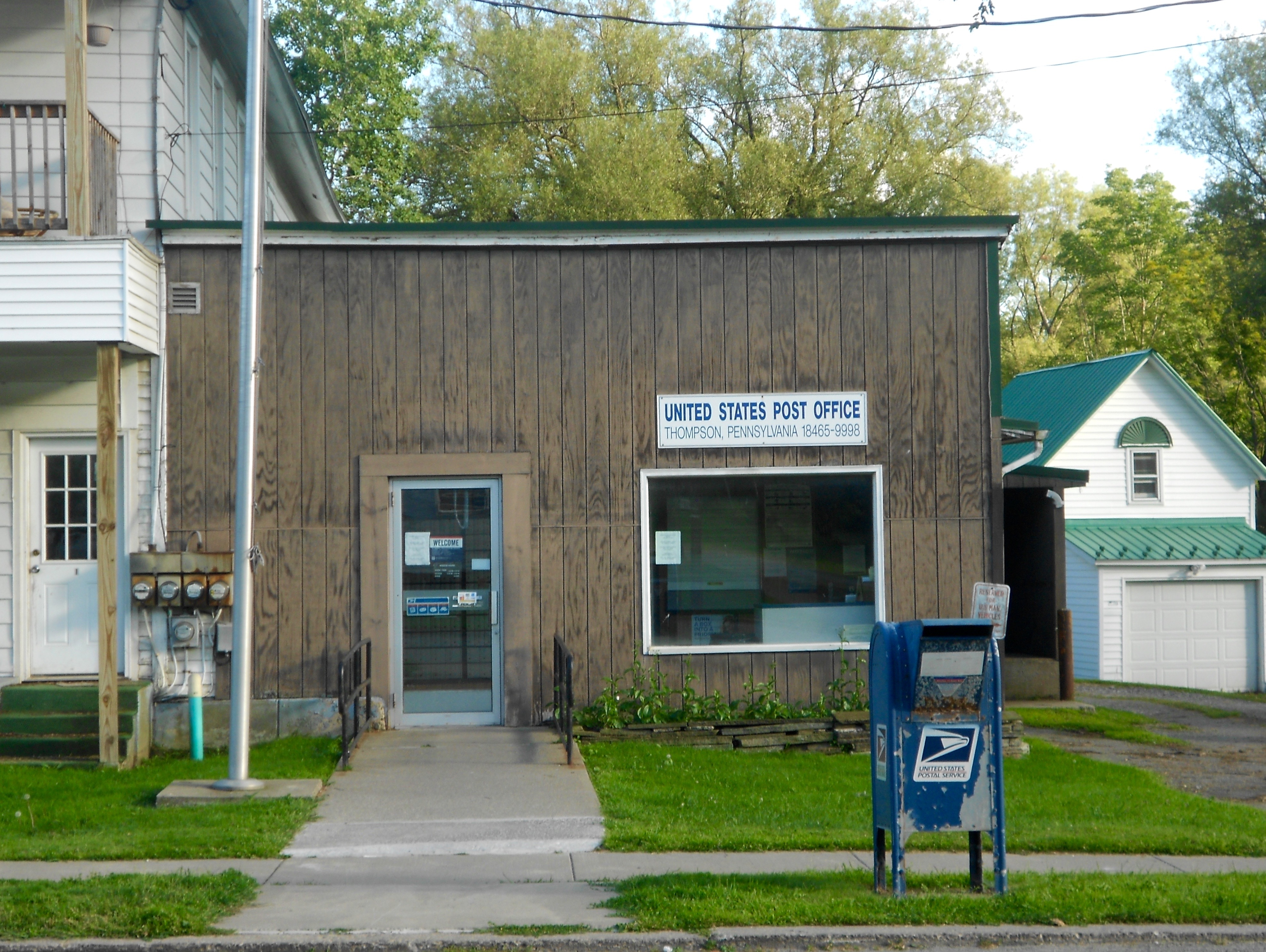
Thompson's post office

Of the 126 households, 26.2% had children under the age of 18 living with them, 42.1% were married couples living together, 14.3% had a female householder with no husband present, and 38.1% were non-families. 27.8% of households were one person, and 11.1% were one person aged 65 or older. The average household size was 2.37 and the average family size was 2.90.

In the borough the population was spread out, with 23.1% under the age of 18, 60.8% from 18 to 64, and 16.1% 65 or older. The median age was 42 years.

The median household income was $31,875 and the median family income was $31,250. Males had a median income of $30,000 versus $19,688 for females. The per capita income for the borough was $14,883. About 20.7% of families and 25.1% of the population were below the poverty line, including 36.3% of those under the age of eighteen and 35.7% of those 65 or over.

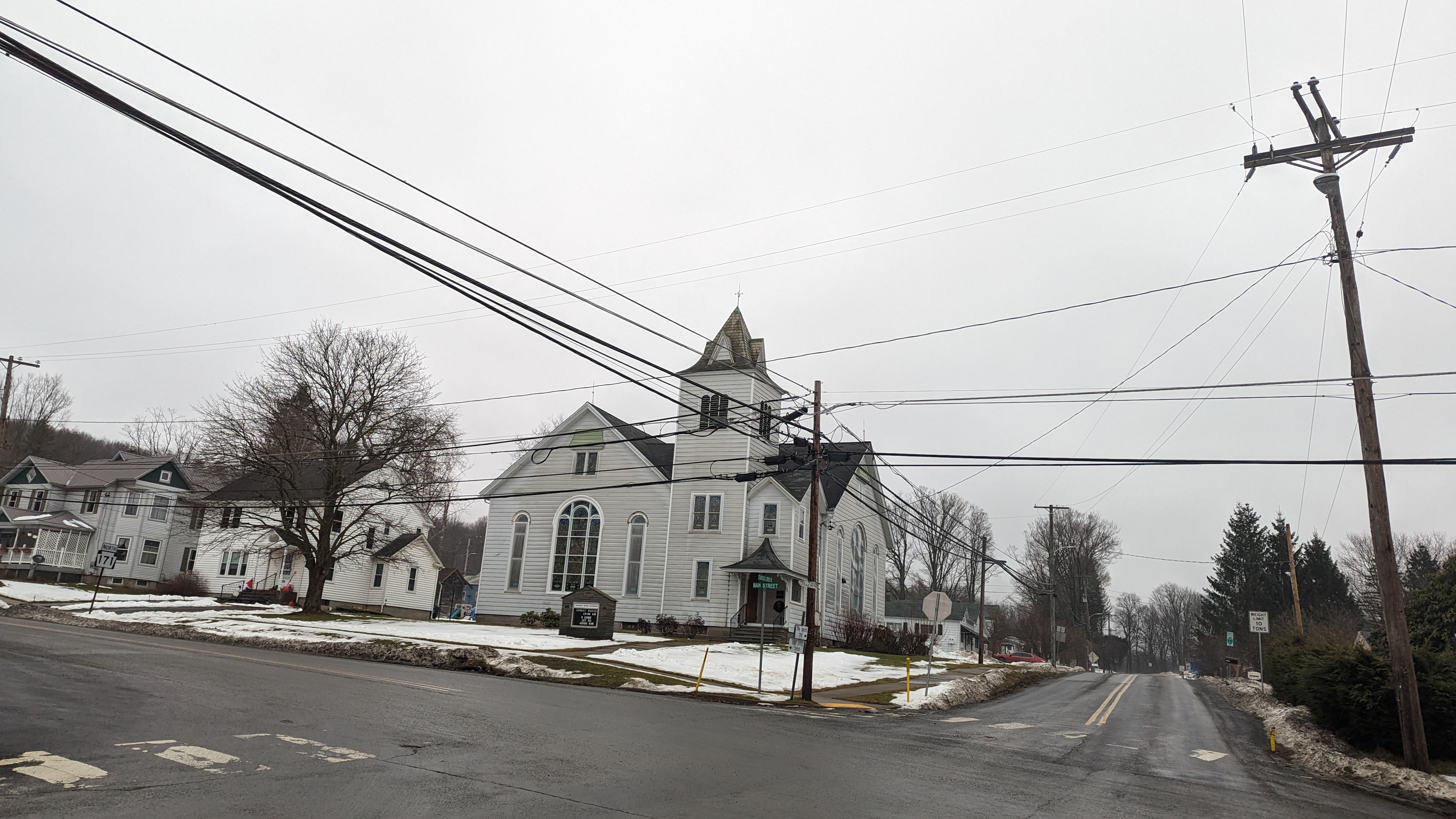
United Methodist Church in Thompson
