= Clarissa Tracy =

American botanist (1818–1905)

Clarissa Tucker Tracy
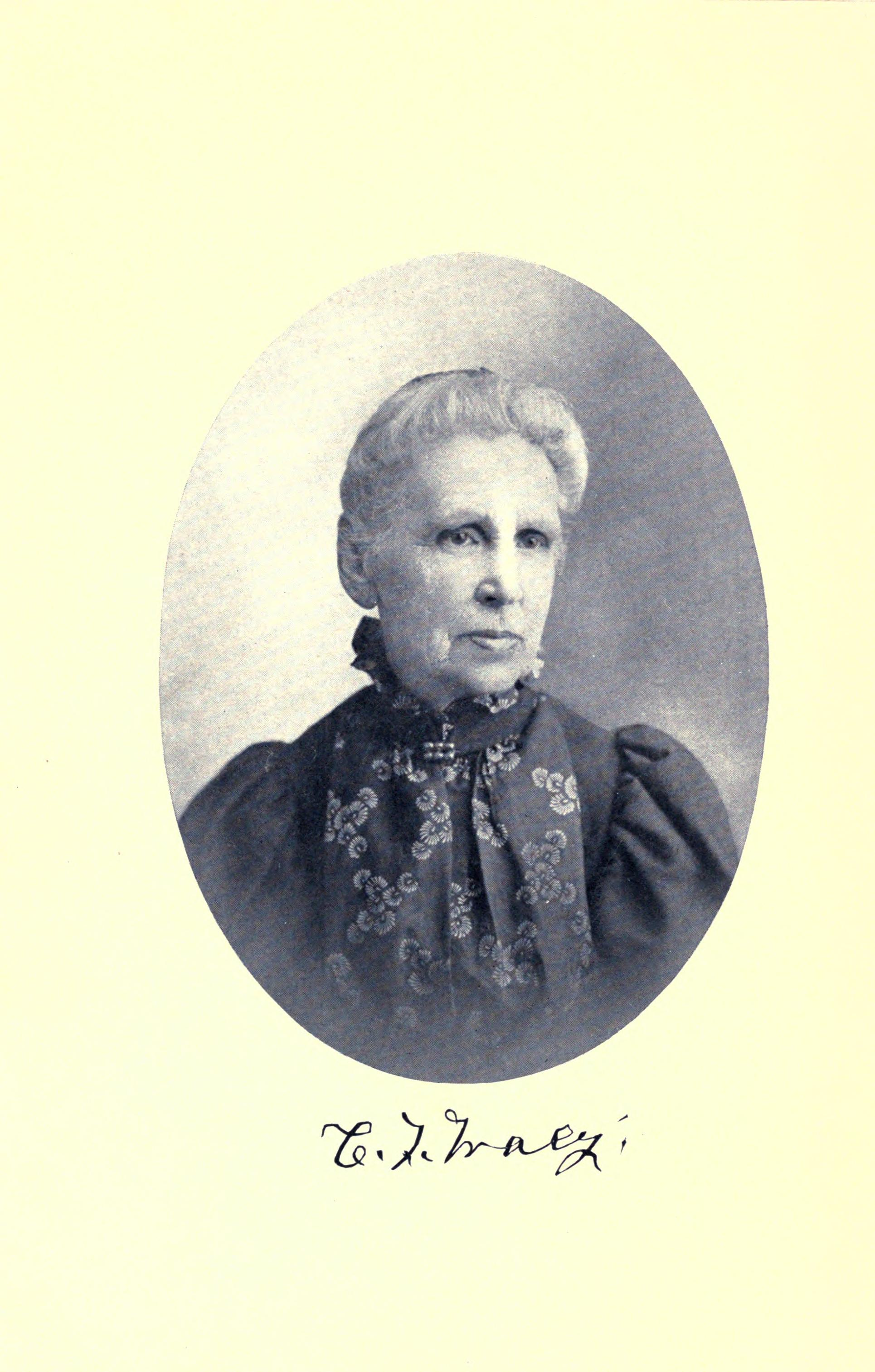
- Born: November 12, 1818; Jackson, Pennsylvania
- Died: 13 November 1905 (aged 87)
- Occupations: botanist, educator

Clarissa Tucker Tracy (November 12, 1818 – November 13, 1905) was an American botanist and educator.

== Early life and education ==
Tracy was born in Jackson, Susquehanna County, Pennsylvania, daughter of pioneers Stephen Tucker and Lucy Tucker (née Harris).

When Tracy was three years old, she began attending local schools, and by about 1832 was teaching, while she continued her studies. From 1835 to 1840 she was both student and teacher at the Franklin Academy in Harford. In 1840 she became assistant at Ladies Seminary, Honesdale, being appointed head around 1842 and holding that post until 1846. In 1844 she spent one term at Troy Female Seminary, New York. Also in 1844 she married Horace Hyde Tracey, with whom she had two children.

== Career ==
In 1848, Tracy's husband died. From approximately 1849 to 1851, she ran a private school at Honesdale. From then until about 1856, she was associated with the academy there. Between 1856 and 1859, she ran another private school at Neenah, Wisconsin.

In 1859, Tracy was appointed matron in charge of domestic arrangements, head of the ladies department and teacher at Ripon College in Ripon, Wisconsin. She studied the local flora for almost thirty years, publishing her Catalogue in 1889, based entirely on specimens collected by her or her students.

Tracy retired in 1893, buying a house off-campus. She continued tutoring and retained her association with Ripon College up to her death in 1905.

== Works ==
- Catalogue of Plants Growing Without Cultivation in Ripon and the Near Vicinity. Ripon, Wisconsin. 1889, 26 pages.
