= Thompson Township, Pennsylvania =

Thompson Township is the name of some places in the U.S. state of Pennsylvania:

- Thompson Township, Fulton County, Pennsylvania
- Thompson Township, Susquehanna County, Pennsylvania
