= Colonel Snover =

American baseball player (1895-1969)

- Pitcher
- Born: May 16, 1895; Hallstead, Pennsylvania, U.S.
- Died: April 30, 1969 (aged 73); Elmira, New York, U.S.
- Batted: Left Threw: Left

MLB debut
- September 18, 1919, for the New York Giants

Last MLB appearance
- September 25, 1919, for the New York Giants

MLB statistics
- Win–loss record: 0–1
- Earned run average: 1.00
- Strikeouts: 4
- Stats at Baseball Reference

Teams
- New York Giants (1919)

Colonel Lester Snover (May 16, 1895 – April 30, 1969), nicknamed "Bosco", was an American pitcher in Major League Baseball. He played for the New York Giants.
