= Ray Kellogg (actor) =

American film and television actor

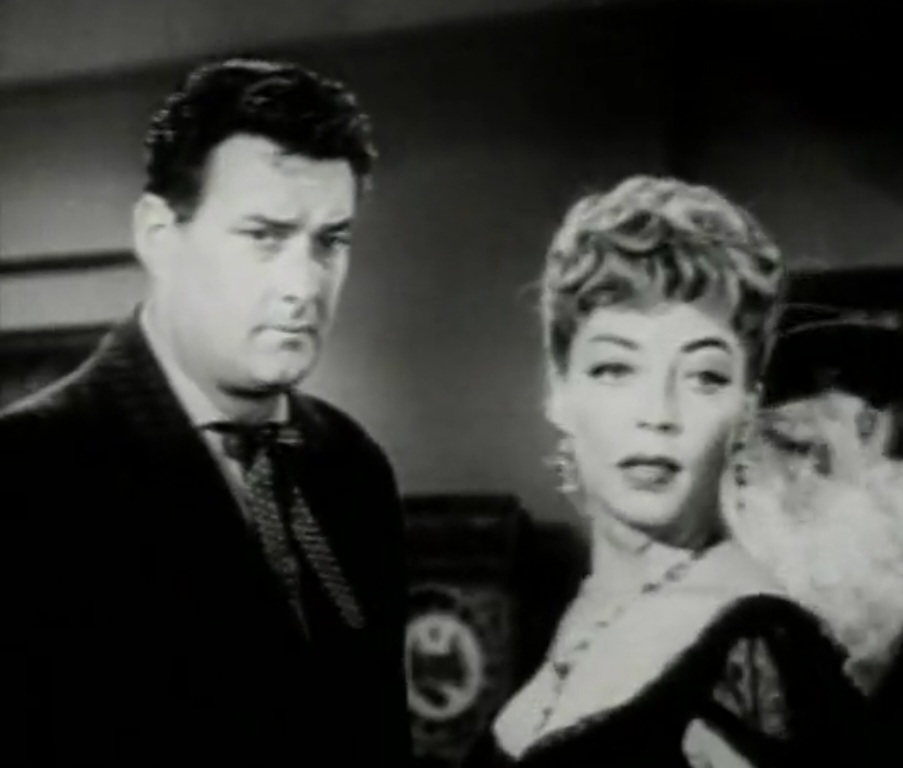
- Kellogg (left) with Marie Windsor in Bat Masterson, 1958
- Born: November 12, 1919; Great Bend, Pennsylvania, U.S.
- Died: September 26, 1981 (aged 61); Olympia, Washington, U.S.
- Occupations: Film and television actor
- Years active: 1942–1972

Ray Kellogg (November 12, 1919 – September 26, 1981) was an American film and television actor. He was known for playing the role of Deputy Ollie in the American western television series The Life and Legend of Wyatt Earp.

== Life and career ==
Kellogg was born in Great Bend, Pennsylvania. He made his screen debut in 1942 with an uncredited role as a singer in the film Behind the Eight Ball. In 1951 he appeared in I'll See You in My Dreams, and in 1953 in the films She's Back on Broadway, So This Is Love, and Calamity Jane.

Later film appearances included The Miami Story (1954), The Court Jester (1955), My Gun Is Quick (1957), The Gunfight at Dodge City (1959), Raymie (1960), The Music Man (1962), Johnny Cool (1963), The Best Man (1964), Zebra in the Kitchen (1965), Chamber of Horrors (1966), The Big Mouth and The Shakiest Gun in the West (1968). His final credit was for the 1971 film Chandler.

== Death ==
Kellogg died on September 26, 1981, in Olympia, Washington, at the age of 61.
