= Fanny DuBois Chase =

American social reformer and author

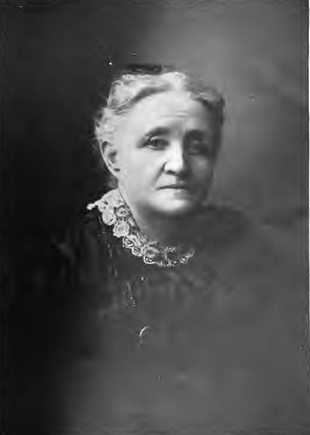
- DuBois Chase in 1899
- Born: Fanny DuBois; November 24, 1828; Great Bend, Pennsylvania, U.S.
- Died: December 6, 1902 (aged 74); Hallstead, Pennsylvania, U.S.
- Occupations: social reformer; author
- Spouse: Simeon B. Chase (m. 1851)
- Children: 7
- Writing career
- Pen name: Mrs. S. B. Chase
- Language: English
- Subjects: temperance; religion

Fanny DuBois Chase (née, DuBois; pen name, Mrs. S. B. Chase; November 24, 1828 – December 6, 1902) was an American social reformer and author, prominent in temperance and missionary circles. She was the first National President of the Woman's Christian Temperance Union (WCTU) and a former Pennsylvania State President of the organization. She was a national lecturer of the WCTU and an author of a number of books on religion and temperance.

== Biography ==
Fanny DuBois was born in Great Bend, Pennsylvania, November 24, 1828. Her parents were Abraham and Juliet (Bowes) Du Bois.

On May 1, 1851, she married Simeon B. Chase. Their children were Nicholas (b. 1852), Martha (b. 1854), Marcella (b. 1856), Emmet (b. 1858), Amasa (b. 1862), Simeon (b. 1864), and Catherine (b. 1867).

During the civil war, she nursed the wounded at Hallowell General Hospital near Alexandria, Virginia.

She was active in the temperance cause with her husband from 1854 until 1874. She was a delegate to the First Woman's National Temperance Convention in 1874 in Cleveland, Ohio, which organized the National WCTU, and was chosen vice-president for Pennsylvania, and the same winter called and presided over the convention that organized, and was the first president of, the WCTU in Pennsylvania. She held the office of president for five years thereafter, and was State superintendent of the Sunday-school department of their work thereafter. Chase was the author of a book on Good Templar work entitled, Derry's Lake, which was republished in Edinburgh and London. She also wrote the three degrees, "Faith, Hope and Charity" in the Good Templars' Ritual, which were translated into eighteen different languages.

She died at her home at Hallstead, Pennsylvania, December 6, 1902.

== Selected works ==
- Derry's Lake, 1870
- Glimpses of a Popular Movement; Or, Sketches of the W.C.T.U. of Pennsylvania, 1899
