= Hallstead, Pennsylvania =

Borough in Pennsylvania, US

- Borough
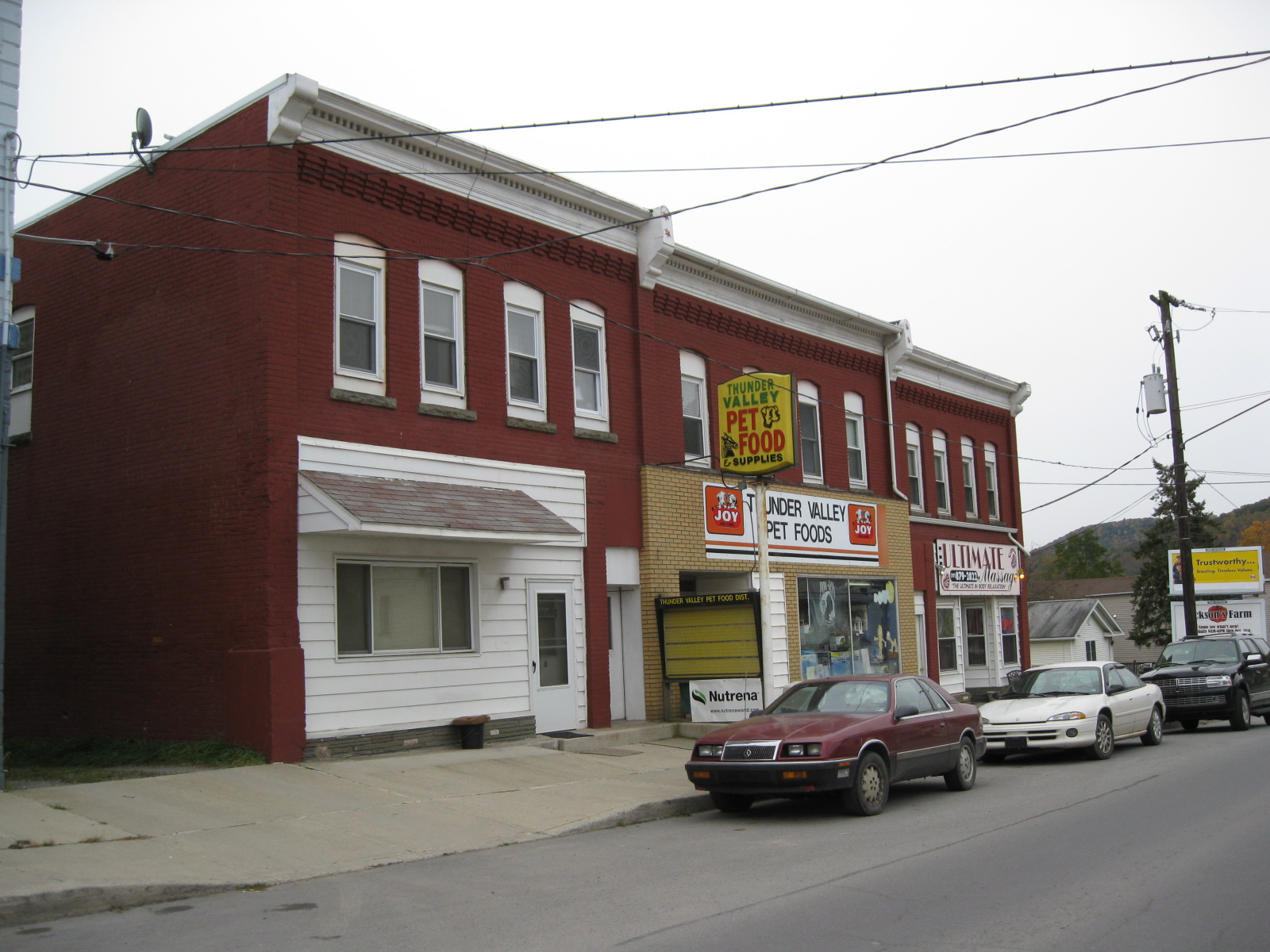
- Hallstead, Pennsylvania

- Location of Hallstead in Susquehanna County, Pennsylvania.

- Location within Pennsylvania Location within the United States
- Coordinates: 41°57′45″N 75°44′55″W
- Country: United States
- State: Pennsylvania
- County: Susquehanna
- Settled: 1787
- Incorporated: 1874

Government
  - Type: Borough Council
  - Mayor: Angela Zick

Area
  - Total: 0.42 sq mi (1.08 km^{2})
  - Land: 0.42 sq mi (1.08 km^{2})
  - Water: 0 sq mi (0.00 km^{2})

Population (2020)
  - Total: 1,174
  - Density: 2,811.2/sq mi (1,085.42/km^{2})
- Time zone: UTC-5 (Eastern (EST))
  - Summer (DST): UTC-4 (EDT)
- Zip code: 18822
- Area code: 570
- FIPS code: 42-32080

Hallstead is a borough in Susquehanna County, Pennsylvania. The population was 1,179 at the 2020 census.

== History ==
Hallstead was settled in 1787. What is now Hallstead was incorporated as Great Bend Village on November 28, 1874. In 1887, it was renamed to Hallstead Borough in honor of William F. Hallstead, president of the Delaware, Lackawanna and Western Railroad.

== Geography ==
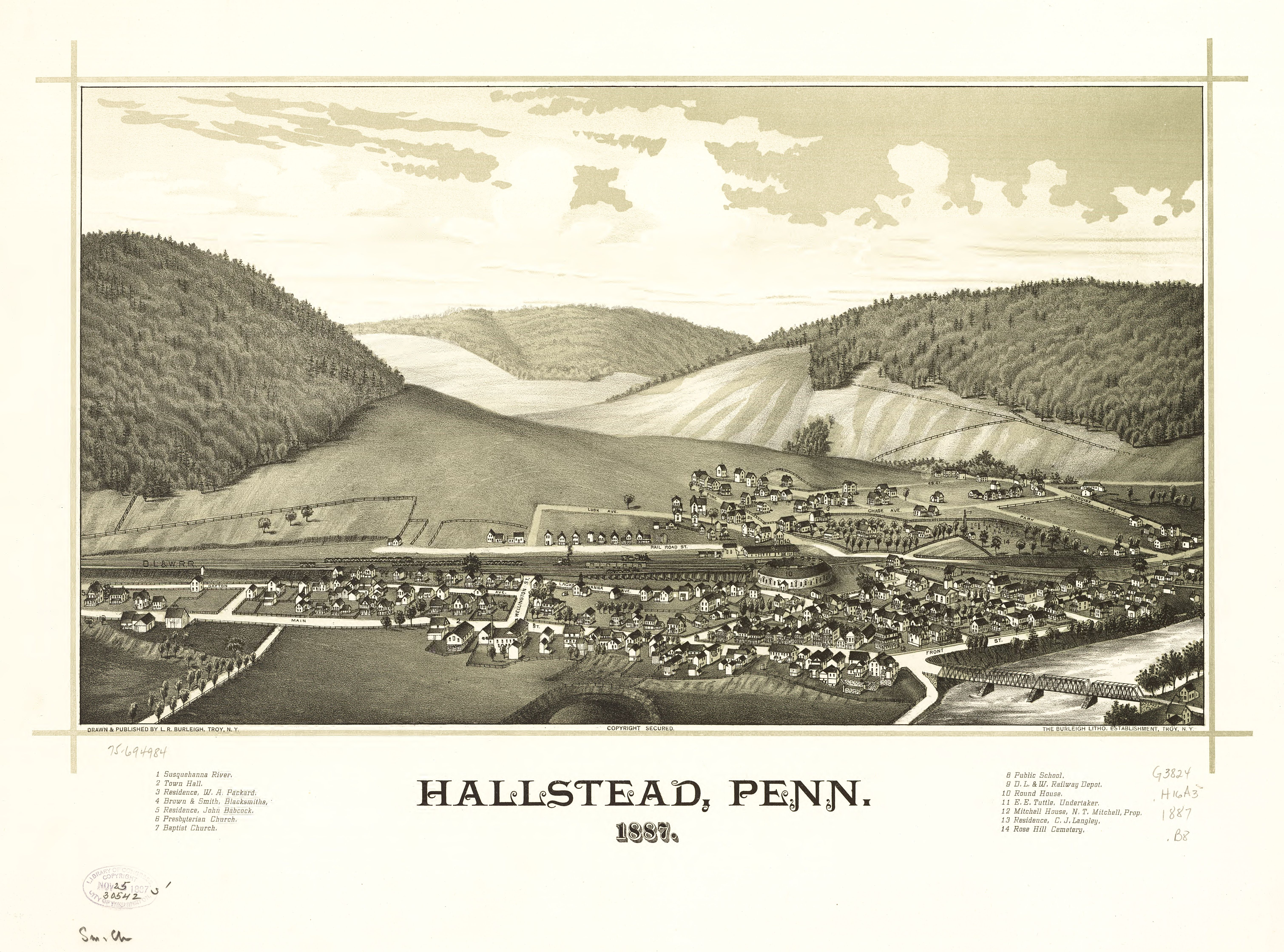
Perspective map of Hallstead with list of landmarks from 1887 by L.R. Burleigh

Hallstead is located at 41°57′45″N 75°44′55″W (41.962425, -75.748598).

According to the United States Census Bureau, the borough has a total area of 0.4 square miles (1.0 km^{2}), all land.

The boroughs of Hallstead and nearby Great Bend are bisected by both Interstate 81 and the Susquehanna River.

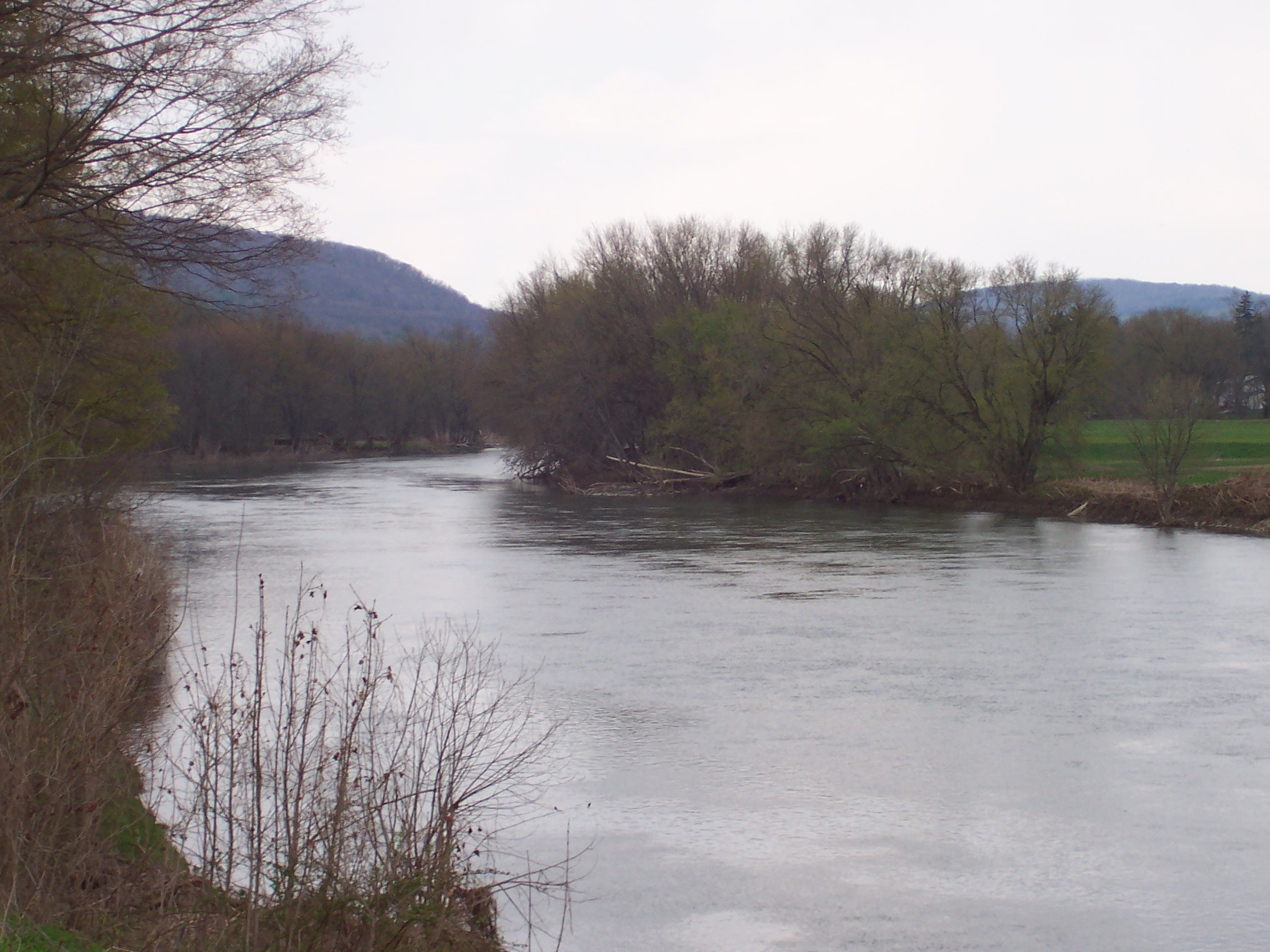
Susquehanna River at Hallstead

== Demographics ==
Historical population
Census	Pop.	Note	%±
1880	546		—
1890	1,167		113.7%
1900	1,404		20.3%
1910	1,538		9.5%
1920	1,261		−18.0%
1930	1,254		−0.6%
1940	1,293		3.1%
1950	1,445		11.8%
1960	1,580		9.3%
1970	1,447		−8.4%
1980	1,280		−11.5%
1990	1,274		−0.5%
2000	1,216		−4.6%
2010	1,303		7.2%
2020	1,174		−9.9%
2021 (est.)	1,178	▲	0.3%

As of the census of 2010, there were 1,303 people, 572 households, and 347 families residing in the borough. The population density was 3,257.5 inhabitants per square mile (1,257.7/km^{2}). There were 606 housing units at an average density of 1,515 per square mile (585/km^{2}). The racial makeup of the borough was 97.5% White, 0.7% African American, 0.4% Native American, and 1.4% from two or more races. Hispanic or Latino of any race were 1% of the population.

There were 572 households, out of which 28.8% had children under the age of 18 living with them, 41.6% were married couples living together, 13.1% had a female householder with no husband present, and 39.3% were non-families. 34.8% of all households were made up of individuals, and 19.2% had someone living alone who was 65 years of age or older. The average household size was 2.28 and the average family size was 2.90.

In the borough the population was spread out, with 22.7% under the age of 18, 58.4% from 18 to 64, and 18.9% who were 65 years of age or older. The median age was 44 years.

The median income for a household in the borough was $45,649, and the median income for a family was $46,313. Males had a median income of $39,531 versus $21,481 for females. The per capita income for the borough was $18,181. About 10.9% of families and 13.1% of the population were below the poverty line, including 17.1% of those under age 18 and 10.9% of those age 65 or over.

== Education ==
Hallstead lies in Blue Ridge School District. The Elementary, Middle and High Schools are all located about 9 miles (14 km) south of Hallstead. The Elementary School consists of Kindergarten to fifth grade with approximately 488 students in attendance. The Middle School consists of grades 6-8 and has approximately 297 students. The High School consists of grades 9–12 with approximately 429 students.

The School Board Consists of: Alan Hall (President), Christina Cosmello (Vice President), Joel Whitehead (Treasurer), Loren Small (Secretary), Christina Whitney, Harold Empett, John Ketchur, Cindy Gaughan, Shane Rumage, Laurie Brown-Bonner, and Robert McTiernan (Superintendent).

== The Foundry ==
The Foundry consists of 27 acres (110,000 m^{2}) of land on Main Street in Hallstead. During the early 1900s, it was a manufacturer of lead crystal but after almost three decades, ownership shifted and it became a major foundry.

== Library System ==
The Hallstead-Great Bend Branch Library is located on 201 Franklin Street, Hallstead PA.

- November 1899—There was mention in a local paper that there were arrangements made for a "Citizen's Library"
- December 1915—A concrete lock-up building was constructed by Alfred E. Badgley for $1900 for the Hallstead Boro
- September 1916—The Hallstead Women's Christian Temperance Union opened a "Reading Room" to the public
- 1917—Rented a room in the Lamb House at the corner of Susquehanna & Pine Streets, started with 40 books
- 1918—Moved to William Richard house, outgrew the rooms
- November 1920—The Hallstead Public Library moved to present location (201 Franklin Street), sharing facilities with local jail.
- 1929—The Civic Club formed a Book Club
- 1931—The Civic Club began sponsoring the library.
- April 1936—The Civic Club took over running the library
- 1976—Children's Room donated in memory of Alfred Hall
- 1999—Joined with the Susquehanna County Library System and became the Hallstead-Great Bend Branch Library

== Notable people ==
- Fanny DuBois Chase, social reformer and author
- Ernest Cadman Colwell, biblical scholar and paleographer
- Ruth deForest Lamb, consumer advocate
- Danny McDevitt, baseball pitcher
- Colonel Snover, baseball pitcher
- Douglas Arthur Teed, painter
