= Jessup Township, Susquehanna County, Pennsylvania =

Township in Pennsylvania, United States

Jessup Township, Pennsylvania
- Township
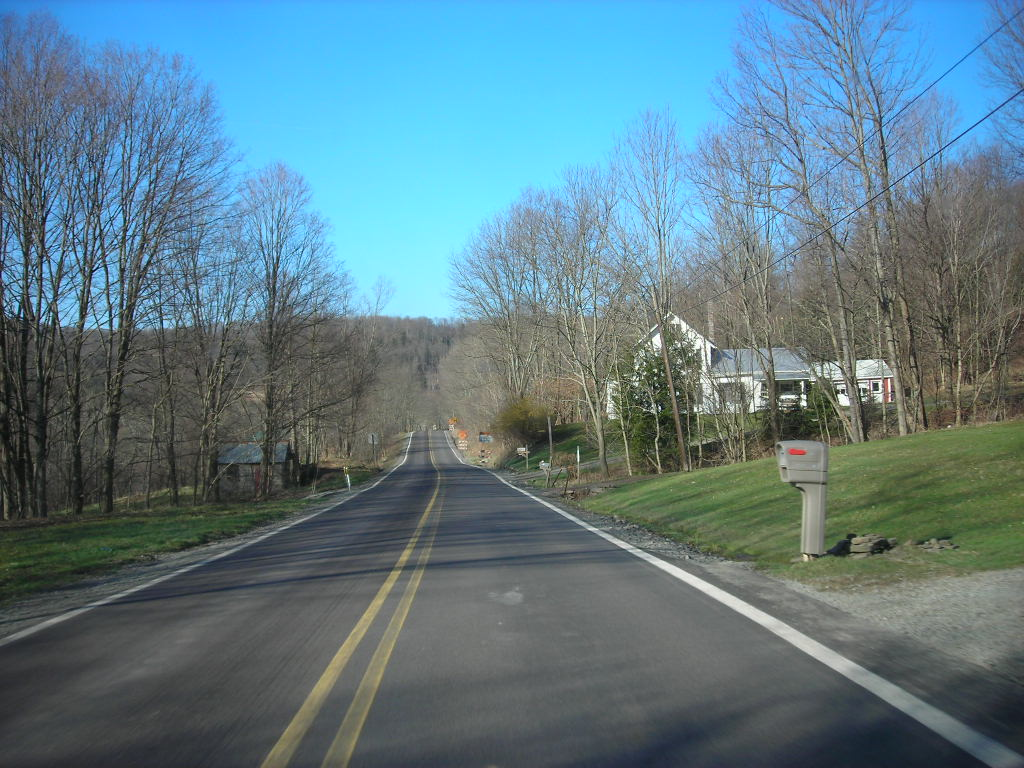
- PA 706 westbound in Jessup Township

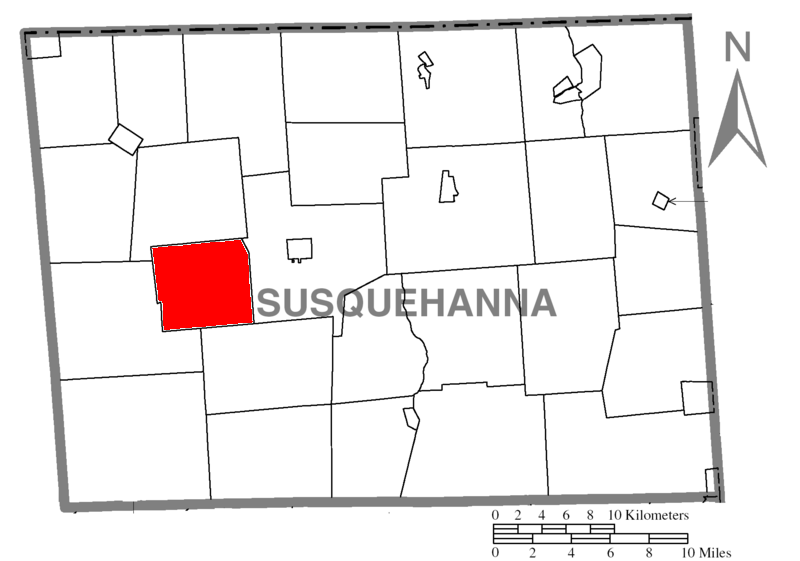

- Location of Pennsylvania in the United States
- Coordinates: 41°49′00″N 76°00′29″W
- Country: United States
- State: Pennsylvania
- County: Susquehanna
- Settled: 1799
- Incorporated: 1806

Area
  - Total: 21.28 sq mi (55.11 km^{2})
  - Land: 21.21 sq mi (54.94 km^{2})
  - Water: 0.066 sq mi (0.17 km^{2})

Population (2020)
  - Total: 469 ▼
  - Estimate (2021): 472
  - Density: 24.0/sq mi (9.26/km^{2})
- Time zone: UTC-5 (EST)
  - Summer (DST): UTC-4 (EDT)
- ZIP Code: 18801
- Area code: 570
- FIPS code: 42-115-38168

Jessup Township is a township in Susquehanna County, Pennsylvania, United States. The population was 469 at the 2020 census.

== Geography ==
According to the United States Census Bureau, the township has a total area of 21.27 square miles (55.1 km^{2}), of which 21.2 square miles (55 km^{2}) is land and 0.07 square miles (0.18 km^{2}) (0.33%) is water.

== Demographics ==
Historical population
Census	Pop.	Note	%±
2010	536		—
2020	469		−12.5%
2021 (est.)	472		0.6%
U.S. Decennial Census

As of the census of 2010, there were 536 people, 211 households, and 160 families residing in the township. The population density was 25.3 people per square mile (9.8/km^{2}). There were 282 housing units at an average density of 13.3/sq mi (5.2/km^{2}). The racial makeup of the township was 97% White, 0.6% African American, 0.4% American Indian, 0.7% from other races, and 1.3% from two or more races. Hispanic or Latino of any race were 3% of the population.

There were 211 households, out of which 31.3% had children under the age of 18 living with them, 61.6% were married couples living together, 9% had a female householder with no husband present, and 24.2% were non-families. 17.1% of all households were made up of individuals, and 5.6% had someone living alone who was 65 years of age or older. The average household size was 2.54 and the average family size was 2.87.

In the township the population was spread out, with 22% under the age of 18, 61.2% from 18 to 64, and 16.8% who were 65 years of age or older. The median age was 44.3 years.

The median income for a household in the township was $41,250, and the median income for a family was $57,917. Males had a median income of $27,917 versus $31,250 for females. The per capita income for the township was $20,661. About 11.9% of families and 18.5% of the population were below the poverty line, including 27.8% of those under age 18 and 14.1% of those age 65 or over.
