= Auburn Township, Pennsylvania =

Township in Pennsylvania, United States

Auburn Township
- Township
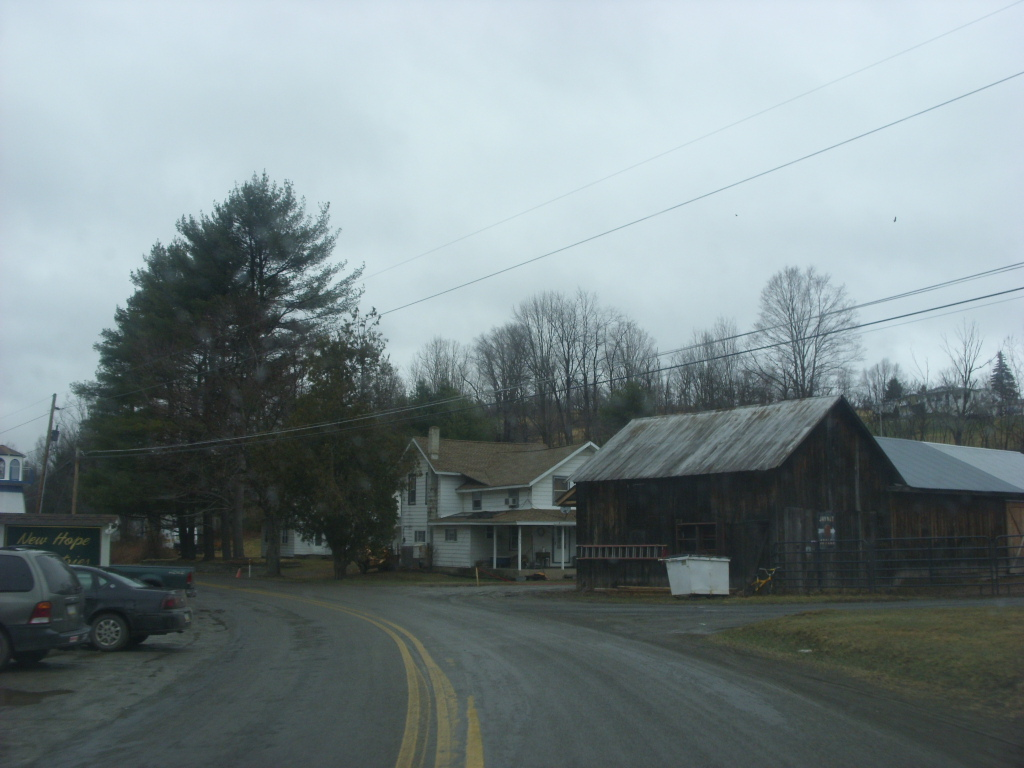
- PA 367 northbound in the village of West Auburn

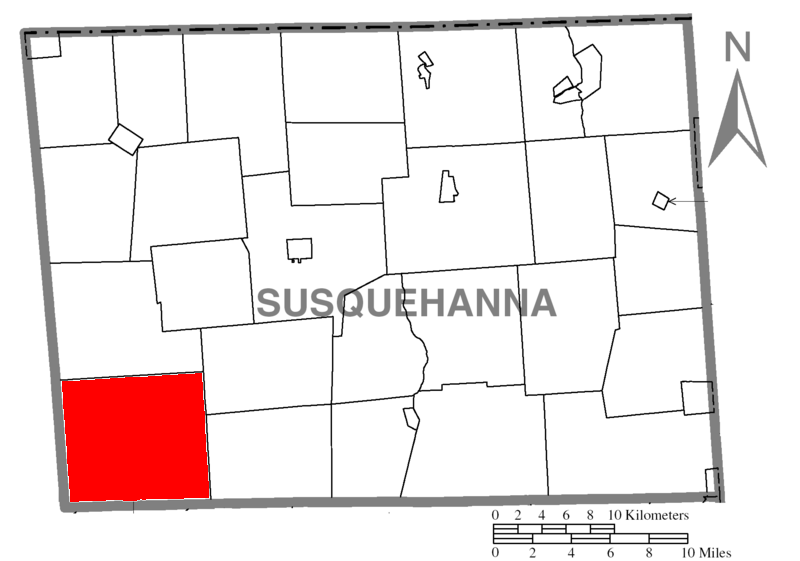
- Location of Auburn Township in Susquehanna County

- Location of Auburn Township in Pennsylvania
- Coordinates: 41°40′00″N 75°59′29″W
- Country: United States
- State: Pennsylvania
- County: Susquehanna
- Settled: 1797

Area
  - Total: 50.34 sq mi (130.39 km^{2})
  - Land: 50.10 sq mi (129.76 km^{2})
  - Water: 0.24 sq mi (0.63 km^{2})

Population (2020)
  - Total: 1,737 ▼
  - Estimate (2021): 1,740
  - Density: 37.2/sq mi (14.38/km^{2})
- Time zone: UTC-5 (EST)
  - Summer (DST): UTC-4 (EDT)
- Area code: 570
- FIPS code: 42-115-03496

Auburn Township is a township in Susquehanna County, Pennsylvania, United States. The population was 1,737 at the 2020 census.

== Geography ==
According to the United States Census Bureau, the township has a total area of 50.3 square miles (130 km^{2}), of which 50.1 square miles (130 km^{2}) is land and 0.2 square miles (0.52 km^{2}) (0.4%) is water.

== Demographics ==
Historical population
Census	Pop.	Note	%±
2010	1,939		—
2020	1,737		−10.4%
2021 (est.)	1,740		0.2%
U.S. Decennial Census

As of the census of 2010, there were 1,939 people, 761 households, and 546 families residing in the township. The population density was 38.7 inhabitants per square mile (14.9/km^{2}). There were 944 housing units at an average density of 18.8/sq mi (7.4/km^{2}). The racial makeup of the township was 98.4% White, 0.05% African American, 0.1% Native American, 0.25% Asian, 0.8% from other races, and 0.4% from two or more races. Hispanic or Latino of any race were 1.8% of the population.

There were 761 households, out of which 31% had children under the age of 18 living with them, 57.8% were married couples living together, 7.1% had a female householder with no husband present, and 28.3% were non-families. 21.2% of all households were made up of individuals, and 8.9% had someone living alone who was 65 years of age or older. The average household size was 2.55 and the average family size was 2.94.

In the township the population was spread out, with 22.8% under the age of 18, 62.2% from 18 to 64, and 15% who were 65 years of age or older. The median age was 42.3 years.

The median income for a household in the township was $40,302, and the median income for a family was $48,750. Males had a median income of $41,484 versus $24,071 for females. The per capita income for the township was $21,112. About 10.2% of families and 15% of the population were below the poverty line, including 22.7% of those under age 18 and 8% of those age 65 or over.
