= Jackson Township, Susquehanna County, Pennsylvania =

Township in Pennsylvania, United States

- Township
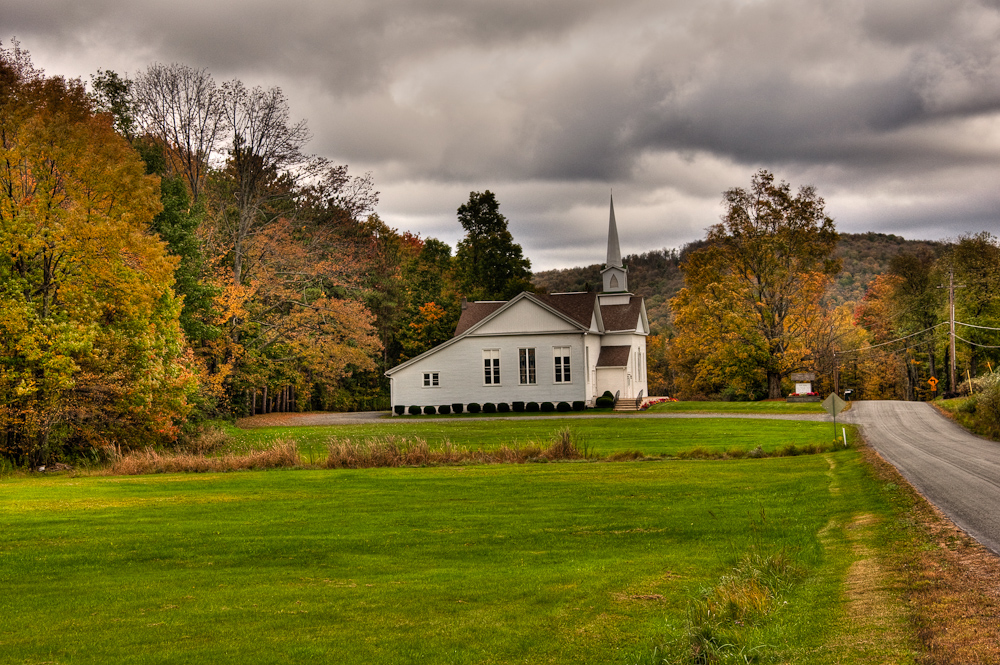
- North Jackson United Methodist Church

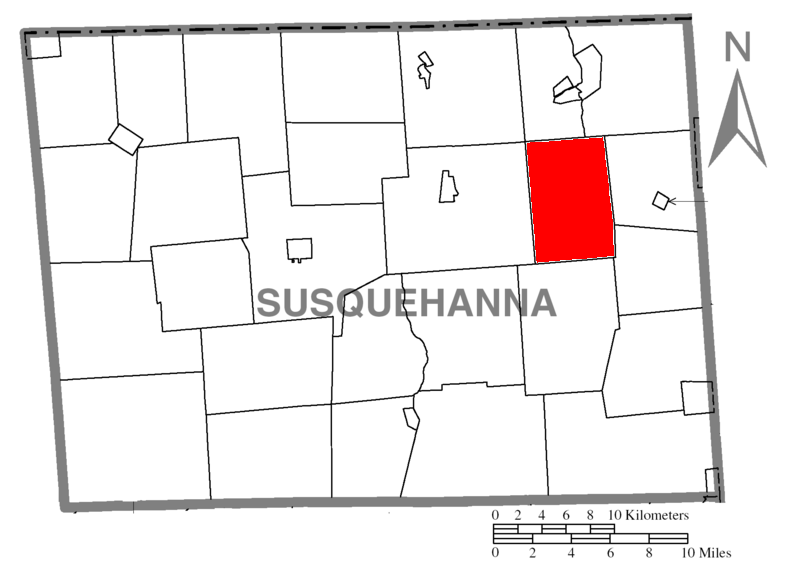

- Location of Pennsylvania in the United States
- Coordinates: 41°52′00″N 75°37′59″W
- Country: United States
- State: Pennsylvania
- County: Susquehanna
- Settled: 1809
- Incorporated: 1814

Area
  - Total: 26.52 sq mi (68.69 km^{2})
  - Land: 26.12 sq mi (67.64 km^{2})
  - Water: 0.41 sq mi (1.05 km^{2})

Population (2020)
  - Total: 857 ▲
  - Estimate (2021): 853
  - Density: 30.3/sq mi (11.69/km^{2})
- Time zone: UTC-5 (EST)
  - Summer (DST): UTC-4 (EDT)
- Area code: 570
- FIPS code: 42-115-37464

Jackson Township is a township in Susquehanna County, Pennsylvania, United States. The population was 857 at the 2020 census. Children living in the township are served by the schools in the Blue Ridge School District, including Blue Ridge High School.

== Geography ==
According to the United States Census Bureau, the township has a total area of 26.5 square miles (69 km^{2}), of which 26.1 square miles (68 km^{2}) is land and 0.4 square miles (1.0 km^{2}) (1.51%) is water.

== History ==
Jackson Township was formed in 1815 from the south part of Harmony Township.

== Demographics ==
Historical population
Census	Pop.	Note	%±
2010	848		—
2020	857		1.1%
2021 (est.)	853		−0.5%
U.S. Decennial Census

As of the census of 2010, there were 848 people, 379 households, and 265 families residing in the township. The population density was 32.5 inhabitants per square mile (12.5/km^{2}). There were 598 housing units at an average density of 22.9/sq mi (8.9/km^{2}). The racial makeup of the township was 99.2% White, 0.5% African American, 0.1% some other race, and 0.2% from two or more races. Hispanic or Latino of any race were 1.2% of the population.

There were 379 households, out of which 19% had children under the age of 18 living with them, 60.9% were married couples living together, 4.5% had a female householder with no husband present, and 30.1% were non-families. 26.4% of all households were made up of individuals, and 12.4% had someone living alone who was 65 years of age or older. The average household size was 2.24 and the average family size was 2.65.

In the township the population was spread out, with 15.4% under the age of 18, 61% from 18 to 64, and 23.6% who were 65 years of age or older. The median age was 52 years.

The median income for a household in the township was $48,438, and the median income for a family was $58,000. Males had a median income of $45,000 versus $30,625 for females. The per capita income for the township was $24,936. About 5.6% of families and 9.9% of the population were below the poverty line, including 11.5% of those under age 18 and 10.4% of those age 65 or over.

== Notable person ==
- Clarissa Tucker Tracy (1818–1905), American botanist, was born in Jackson Township
