= Blue Ridge School District =

School district in Pennsylvania, U.S.

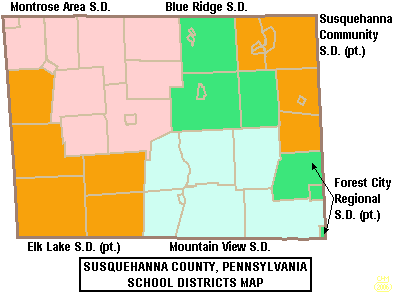

Address
- 5058 School Road New Milford, Pennsylvania, 18834; United States

District information
- Grades: PreK-12

Students and staff
- District mascot: Raiders
- Colors: Red and white

Other information
- Website: www.brsd.org

The Blue Ridge School District is a small, rural, public school district located in Susquehanna County in northeastern Pennsylvania. It serves the Boroughs of Great Bend, Hallstead and New Milford and Great Bend Township, Jackson Township and New Milford Township. The educational attainment levels for the Blue Ridge School District population (25 years old and over) were 89.6% high school graduates and 13.5% college graduates. The district is one of the 500 public school districts of Pennsylvania.

According to the Pennsylvania Budget and Policy Center, 42.9% of the district's pupils lived at 185% or below the Federal Poverty Level as shown by their eligibility for the federal free or reduced price school meal programs in 2012. In 2013, the Pennsylvania Department of Education reported that 13 students in the Blue Ridge School District were homeless.

Blue Ridge School District operates three schools: Blue Ridge High School, Blue Ridge Middle School and Blue Ridge Elementary School. High school students may choose to attend the Susquehanna County Career Technology Center for training in the construction and mechanical trades.
