= Ruth deForest Lamb =

American chemist

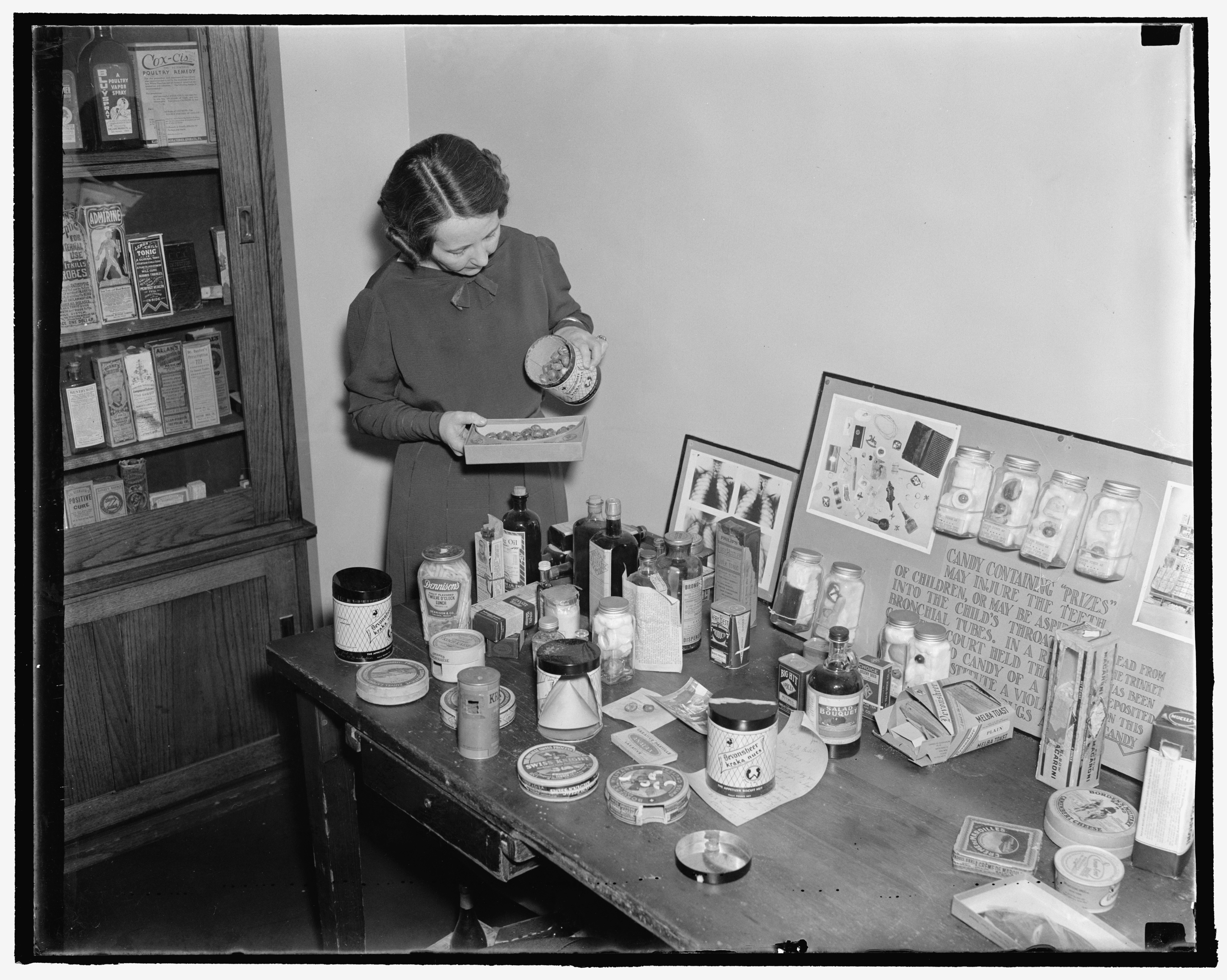
- Ruth deForest Lamb in 1937
- Born: 1896; Hallstead, Pennsylvania, US
- Died: June 11, 1978 (aged 81–82)
- Education: Vassar College
- Scientific career
- Fields: Consumer advocate
- Workplaces: U.S. Food and Drug Administration (FDA)

Ruth deForest Lamb (later Atkinson, 1896 – June 11, 1978) was the first Chief Educational Officer at the U.S. Food and Drug Administration (FDA) and the author of American chamber of horrors: the truth about food and drugs (1936). She organized consumer support for the passage of the Federal Food, Drug, and Cosmetic Act of 1938, particularly targeting congressional wives and women's groups.

== Early life ==
Ruth deForest Lamb was born in 1896 in Hallstead, Pennsylvania. She graduated from Vassar College in 1918. She worked as an advertising copywriter from 1918-1926, one of the first women in the emerging field of advertising. For several years, she worked as an advertising consultant on food, drug, and cosmetic products.

== A century of progress ==
In 1933, Lamb joined the U.S. Food and Drug Administration (FDA), becoming its first Chief Educational Officer. For the "Century of progress" Chicago World's Fair of 1933, Lamb worked with the FDA's Chief Inspector, George Larrick, to create an exhibit of 100 products which it considered "dangerous, deceptive, or worthless" but which the FDA had no legal authority to ban. These included products like Lash Lure, a dye for eyelashes, which had led to cases of blindness and death. In the Government building at the Fair, the FDA displayed seventeen boards showing "large, vivid pictures coupled with spare, terse prose". Photographs of the panels and the exhibit are included in the Ruth Lamb Atkinson Papers at Vassar College. Between June and November, millions visited.

In October 1933, Paramount produced a 2 1/2 minute newsreel clip referencing the exhibit and discussing proposals for revised legislation, presented by Rexford Tugwell. After the World's Fair was closed on November 12, 1933, the exhibit was returned to Washington, D.C. There it was visited by First Lady Eleanor Roosevelt, attracting considerable media attention. The exhibit was dubbed a "chamber of horrors" by reporters.

== American chamber of horrors ==
Ruth Lamb used the nickname in the title of her book, American chamber of horrors: the truth about food and drugs (1936). Lamb's book was written in part to counter the criticisms of 100,000,000 Guinea Pigs: Dangers in Everyday Foods, Drugs, and Cosmetics (1933) by Arthur Kallet and Frederick J. Schlink. Their book harshly criticized the FDA for not countering the marketing of dangerous and misleading foods, drugs and cosmetics.

In American chamber of horrors, Lamb discussed many of the same products. She incorporated information from the FDA's 1933 exhibit, and from the FDA's archives, indicating that dangerous products were known and studied by the FDA. Both FDA officials and Lamb herself stated that she wrote the book as a private citizen, and not as an official representative of the FDA. Nonetheless, her position as an FDA educational officer gave her access to important government sources. She made effective use of letters from private citizens requesting help and legislation.

In addition, Lamb discussed the regulation of such products in the context of the Pure Food and Drug Act of 1906, or "Wiley Act". Lamb "systematically explored the legal limitations" of the Wiley Act, explaining in detail areas where it was outdated, obsolete, or could not be applied, including the use of radio for advertising and the regulation of cosmetics and medical devices. By doing so, she suggested a pattern for the development of new legislation and made a powerful case for its need.

"All of these tragedies ... have happened, not because Government officials are incompetent or callous, but because they have no real power to prevent them."

Lamb's book American chamber of horrors, like 100,000,000 Guinea Pigs, became both popular and influential. Lamb played a key role in communicating the limitations of existing legislation and the need for new legislation, to the public, to Congressmen, and to their wives. Lamb focused her efforts on mobilizing women's groups around the need for new legislation. Washington women like Eleanor Roosevelt and other Congressional wives in Washington, D.C. had both an interest in the issue and the potential to influence discussions, pressuring lawmakers to take their concerns seriously. This work resulted in the passage of the 1938 Federal Food, Drug, and Cosmetic Act.

== Other works ==
In 1937, news media reported that Lamb had written a script which was under option to be made into a movie. Provisionally titled "Permit to Kill", B. P. Schulberg was suggested to be the producer and Edward Arnold one of the actors. It does not appear that the movie was made.

Lamb also wrote a manuscript for The Devil's Candle: An Informal History of the Federal Food, Drug and Cosmetic Act and Its Operation in Our Social Economy (1937). It was advertised in "Preview of Books for Public Health Workers" in the American Journal of Public Health and the Nation's Health for 1938, but may not have been published. A manuscript is included in her papers at Vassar College. Her papers also include a manuscript for "Magic Oyster" (1928), an unpublished novel.

== Later life ==
In 1942 Ruth deForest Lamb married Henry R. Atkinson and left the FDA. She and her husband traveled in India for some years following World War II.

She eventually returned to Washington, D. C., where she continued to work as a lobbyist for consumer groups such as the National Congress of Parents and Teachers (1942–45). Between 1943 and 1946 she served as a director of Food for Freedom, Ind.

Ruth deForest Lamb died on June 17, 1978.
