= Susquehanna County, Pennsylvania =

County in Pennsylvania, United States

- County
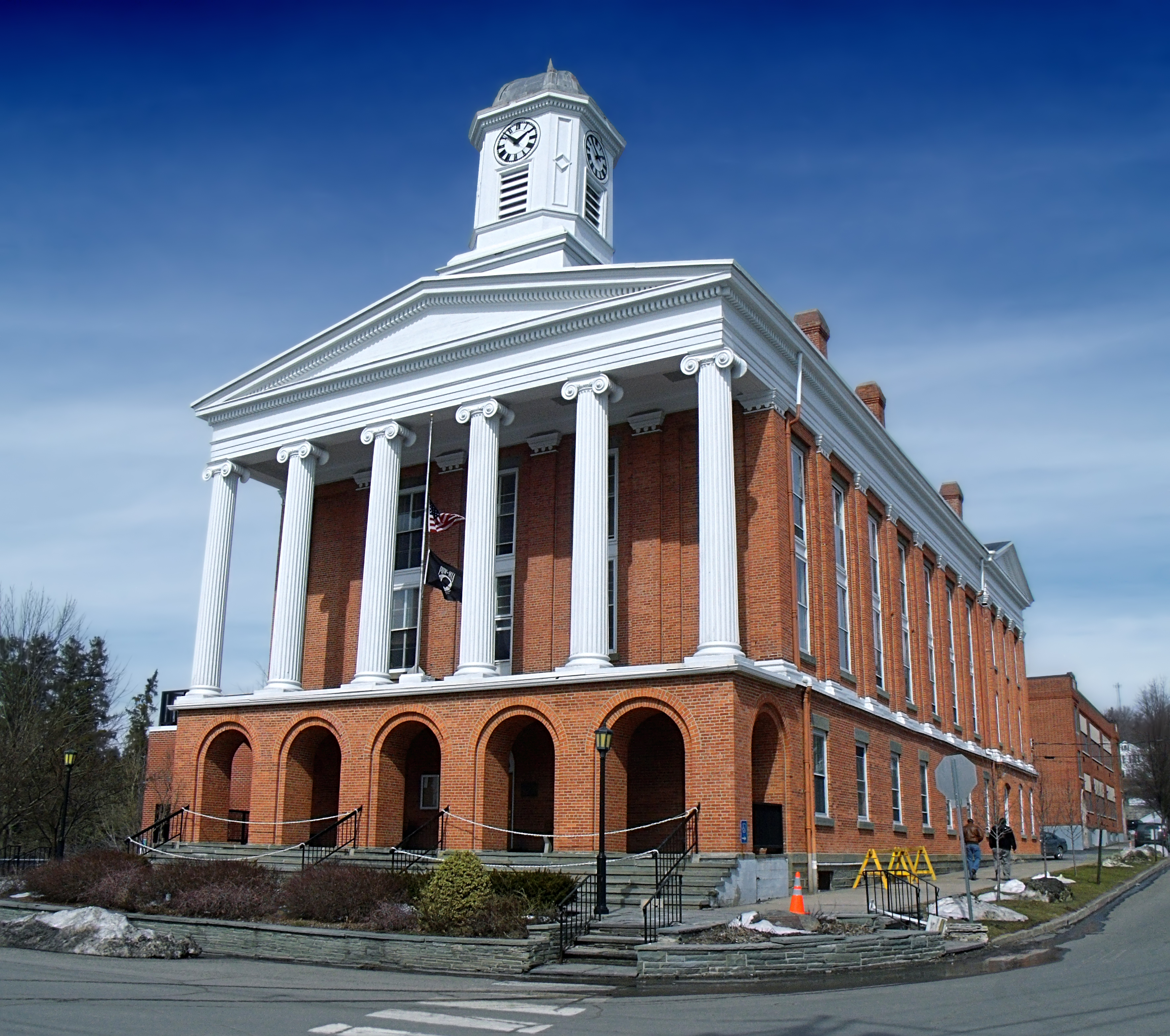
- The Susquehanna County Courthouse in Montrose

- Seal

- Location within the U.S. state of Pennsylvania
- Coordinates: 41°49′17″N 75°48′02″W
- Country: United States
- State: Pennsylvania
- Founded: October 13, 1812
- Named for: Susquehanna River
- Seat: Montrose
- Largest borough: Forest City

Area
  - Total: 832 sq mi (2,150 km^{2})
  - Land: 823 sq mi (2,130 km^{2})
  - Water: 8.7 sq mi (23 km^{2}) 1.0%

Population (2020)
  - Total: 38,434
  - Estimate (2025): 38,237 ▼
  - Density: 46.7/sq mi (18.0/km^{2})
- Time zone: UTC−5 (Eastern)
  - Summer (DST): UTC−4 (EDT)
- Congressional district: 9th
- Website: www.susqco.com

Susquehanna County is a county in the Commonwealth of Pennsylvania. As of the 2020 census, the population was 38,434 Its county seat is Montrose. The county was created on February 21, 1810, from part of Luzerne County and later organized in 1812. It is named for the Susquehanna River. The county is part of the Northeast Pennsylvania region of the state. (Note: Includes Luzerne, Lackawanna, Monroe, Schuylkill, Carbon, Pike, Bradford, Wayne, Susquehanna, Wyoming and Sullivan Counties)

== History ==
=== Settlement and conflict ===
The first non-Indigenous settlers began to move into the area from Philadelphia and Connecticut in the mid-1700s. At the time, the area was part of Luzerne County. As more and more people from Connecticut moved in, there began to be some conflict. Connecticut's original land grant gave it control of land within the northern and southern boundaries from present-day Connecticut to the Pacific Ocean. Their land grant overlapped with that of Pennsylvania. Soon fighting began between migrants from each state, resulting in the 1769–1799 Pennamite–Yankee Wars. In the end, the government of Connecticut surrendered its claim on the area.

=== Formation ===
In 1810, Susquehanna County was formed out of Luzerne County and later in 1812, Montrose was made the county seat.

=== Coal and early prosperity ===
After the Civil War, coal started to be mined. Following this, railways and roads were built into the county allowing for more people to come. At one point the county had nearly 50,000 people. Coal became, as with neighboring counties, the backbone of the economy. This boom in coal would allow for an age of prosperity in the county.

=== Great Depression ===
When the Great Depression hit, the coal industry suffered horribly. Within months, the coal industry was struggling. During World War II, the coal industry picked up again, but only for a short time. Soon after, the economy in the county failed. Many mines were closed, railways were torn apart, and the economy took a turn for the worse. Unemployment rose and population decline increased.

== Geography ==
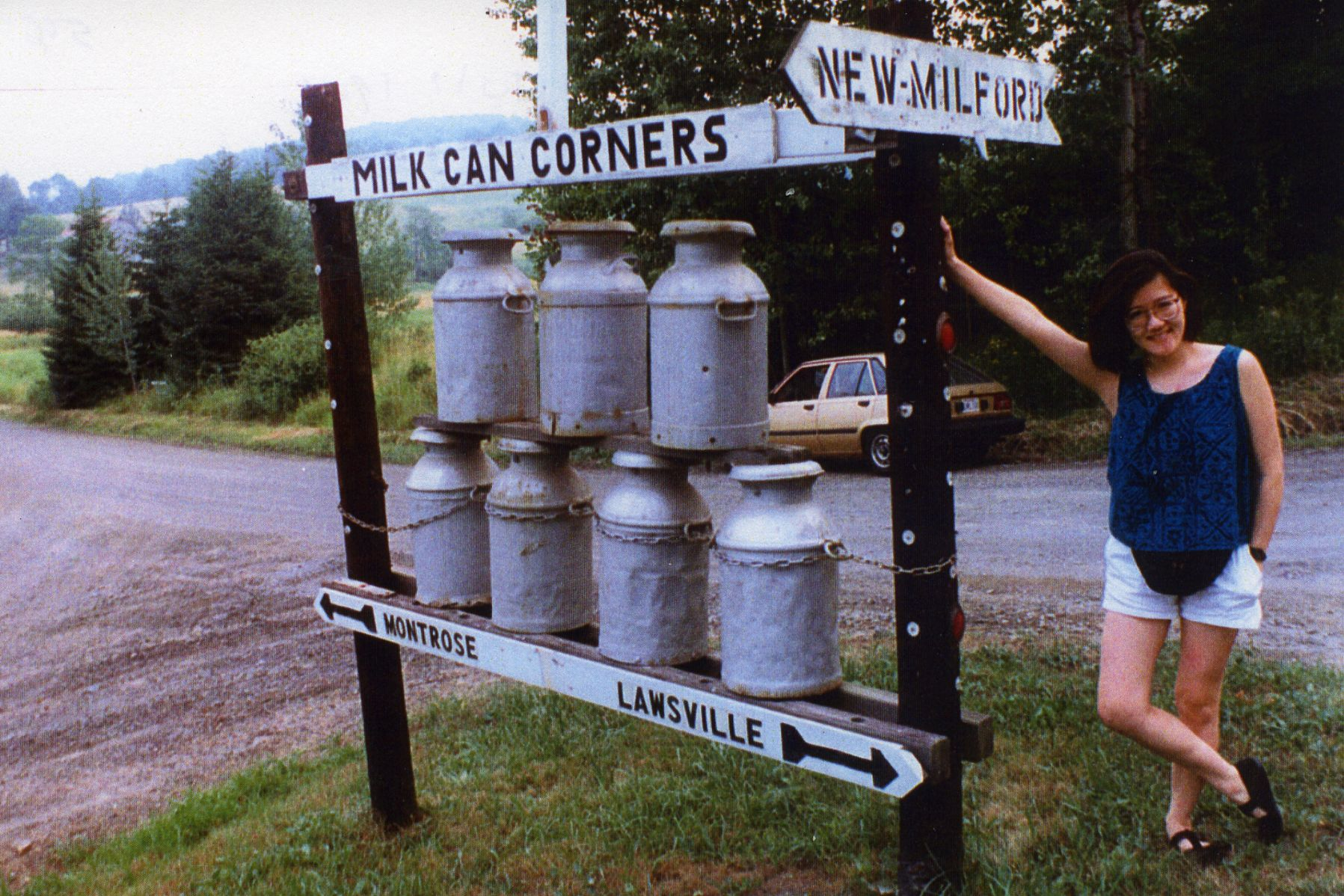
Milk Can Corners in Hallstead

According to the U.S. Census Bureau, the county has a total area of 832 square miles (2,150 km^{2}), of which 823 square miles (2,130 km^{2}) is land and 8.7 square miles (23 km^{2}) (1.0%) is water.

Susquehanna County is very mountainous, with large concentrations of mountains in the east and smaller, more hill-like mountains in the west. The highest mountain in the county is North Knob just west of Union Dale. Most people live in one of the several long and mostly narrow valleys. These valleys are good farming land.

The county has a warm-summer humid continental climate (Dfb) and average monthly temperatures in Montrose range from 21.2 °F in January to 67.7 °F in July.

=== Adjacent counties ===
- Broome County, New York (north)
- Wayne County (east)
- Lackawanna County (southeast)
- Wyoming County (southwest)
- Bradford County (west)
- Tioga County, New York (northwest)

== Demographics ==
Historical population
| Census | Pop. | Note | %± |
|---|---|---|---|
| 1820 | 9,960 | | — |
| 1830 | 16,787 | | 68.5% |
| 1840 | 21,195 | | 26.3% |
| 1850 | 28,688 | | 35.4% |
| 1860 | 36,267 | | 26.4% |
| 1870 | 37,523 | | 3.5% |
| 1880 | 40,354 | | 7.5% |
| 1890 | 40,093 | | −0.6% |
| 1900 | 40,043 | | −0.1% |
| 1910 | 37,746 | | −5.7% |
| 1920 | 34,763 | | −7.9% |
| 1930 | 33,806 | | −2.8% |
| 1940 | 33,893 | | 0.3% |
| 1950 | 31,970 | | −5.7% |
| 1960 | 33,137 | | 3.7% |
| 1970 | 34,344 | | 3.6% |
| 1980 | 37,876 | | 10.3% |
| 1990 | 40,380 | | 6.6% |
| 2000 | 42,238 | | 4.6% |
| 2010 | 43,356 | | 2.6% |
| 2020 | 38,434 | | −11.4% |
| 2025 (est.) | 38,237 | ▼ | −0.5% |
U.S. Decennial Census; 1790-1960 1900-1990; 1990-2000 2010-2017

=== Racial and ethnic composition ===
Susquehanna County, Pennsylvania – Racial and ethnic composition Note: the US Census treats Hispanic/Latino as an ethnic category. This table excludes Latinos from the racial categories and assigns them to a separate category. Hispanics/Latinos may be of any race.
| Race / Ethnicity (NH = Non-Hispanic) | Pop 1980 | Pop 1990 | Pop 2000 | Pop 2010 | Pop 2020 | % 1980 | % 1990 | % 2000 | % 2010 | % 2020 |
|---|---|---|---|---|---|---|---|---|---|---|
| White alone (NH) | 37,551 | 39,961 | 41,429 | 42,117 | 35,799 | 99.14% | 98.96% | 98.08% | 97.14% | 93.14% |
| Black or African American alone (NH) | 45 | 79 | 117 | 150 | 138 | 0.12% | 0.20% | 0.28% | 0.35% | 0.36% |
| Native American or Alaska Native alone (NH) | 44 | 83 | 58 | 52 | 59 | 0.12% | 0.21% | 0.14% | 0.12% | 0.15% |
| Asian alone (NH) | 52 | 87 | 91 | 121 | 135 | 0.14% | 0.22% | 0.22% | 0.28% | 0.35% |
| Native Hawaiian or Pacific Islander alone (NH) | x | x | 4 | 9 | 0 | x | x | 0.01% | 0.02% | 0.00% |
| Other race alone (NH) | 33 | 8 | 17 | 18 | 98 | 0.09% | 0.02% | 0.04% | 0.04% | 0.25% |
| Mixed race or Multiracial (NH) | x | x | 237 | 325 | 1,358 | x | x | 0.56% | 0.75% | 3.53% |
| Hispanic or Latino (any race) | 151 | 162 | 285 | 564 | 847 | 0.40% | 0.40% | 0.67% | 1.30% | 2.20% |
| Total | 37,876 | 40,380 | 42,238 | 43,356 | 38,434 | 100.00% | 100.00% | 100.00% | 100.00% | 100.00% |

=== 2020 census ===
As of the 2020 census, the county had a population of 38,434. The median age was 48.2 years, 19.5% of residents were under the age of 18, and 23.7% of residents were 65 years of age or older; for every 100 females there were 100.1 males, and for every 100 females age 18 and over there were 99.6 males age 18 and over.

The racial makeup of the county was 93.8% White, 0.4% Black or African American, 0.2% American Indian and Alaska Native, 0.4% Asian, <0.1% Native Hawaiian and Pacific Islander, 0.9% from some other race, and 4.3% from two or more races. Hispanic or Latino residents of any race comprised 2.2% of the population.

<0.1% of residents lived in urban areas, while 100.0% lived in rural areas.

There were 16,297 households in the county, of which 24.5% had children under the age of 18 living in them. Of all households, 49.7% were married-couple households, 19.9% were households with a male householder and no spouse or partner present, and 22.5% were households with a female householder and no spouse or partner present. About 29.5% of all households were made up of individuals and 15.0% had someone living alone who was 65 years of age or older.

There were 21,259 housing units, of which 23.3% were vacant. Among occupied housing units, 77.0% were owner-occupied and 23.0% were renter-occupied. The homeowner vacancy rate was 1.7% and the rental vacancy rate was 8.3%.

=== 2000 census ===
As of the census of 2000, there were 42,238 people, 16,529 households, and 11,785 families residing in the county. The population density was 51 people per square mile (20 people/km^{2}). There were 21,829 housing units at an average density of 26 units per square mile (10/km^{2}). The racial makeup of the county was 98.54% White, 0.30% Black or African American, 0.15% Native American, 0.22% Asian, 0.01% Pacific Islander, 0.17% from other races, and 0.60% from two or more races. 0.67% of the population were Hispanic or Latino of any race. 26% were of English, 16.1% were of German, 15.1% Irish, 8.6% Italian and 7.7% Polish ancestry.

There were 16,529 households, out of which 31.90% had children under the age of 18 living with them, 57.70% were married couples living together, 8.60% had a female householder with no husband present, and 28.70% were non-families. 24.30% of all households were made up of individuals, and 11.50% had someone living alone who was 65 years of age or older. The average household size was 2.53 and the average family size was 2.99.

In the county, the population was spread out, with 25.50% under the age of 18, 6.70% from 18 to 24, 27.10% from 25 to 44, 25.20% from 45 to 64, and 15.50% who were 65 years of age or older. The median age was 40 years. For every 100 females, there were 98.90 males. For every 100 females age 18 and over, there were 95.80 males.

== Politics ==
United States presidential election results for Susquehanna County, Pennsylvania
| Year | Republican | | Democratic | | Third party(ies) | |
| Year | No. | % | No. | % | No. | % |
|---|---|---|---|---|---|---|
| 1888 | 5,019 | 55.30% | 3,328 | 36.67% | 729 | 8.03% |
| 1892 | 4,531 | 53.14% | 3,383 | 39.67% | 613 | 7.19% |
| 1896 | 5,310 | 56.73% | 3,618 | 38.65% | 432 | 4.62% |
| 1900 | 5,019 | 55.24% | 3,527 | 38.82% | 539 | 5.93% |
| 1904 | 4,988 | 61.20% | 2,573 | 31.57% | 589 | 7.23% |
| 1908 | 4,999 | 57.30% | 3,230 | 37.02% | 496 | 5.68% |
| 1912 | 1,988 | 26.87% | 2,588 | 34.98% | 2,822 | 38.15% |
| 1916 | 3,891 | 53.08% | 3,145 | 42.91% | 294 | 4.01% |
| 1920 | 6,572 | 66.41% | 2,905 | 29.36% | 419 | 4.23% |
| 1924 | 7,266 | 67.38% | 2,208 | 20.47% | 1,310 | 12.15% |
| 1928 | 9,445 | 68.14% | 4,353 | 31.40% | 63 | 0.45% |
| 1932 | 6,884 | 55.99% | 5,171 | 42.06% | 240 | 1.95% |
| 1936 | 9,745 | 58.94% | 6,520 | 39.43% | 269 | 1.63% |
| 1940 | 9,520 | 63.71% | 5,383 | 36.03% | 39 | 0.26% |
| 1944 | 8,819 | 67.42% | 4,212 | 32.20% | 49 | 0.37% |
| 1948 | 7,945 | 67.81% | 3,621 | 30.91% | 150 | 1.28% |
| 1952 | 10,529 | 73.97% | 3,653 | 25.66% | 52 | 0.37% |
| 1956 | 10,752 | 71.42% | 4,293 | 28.52% | 10 | 0.07% |
| 1960 | 10,201 | 63.88% | 5,760 | 36.07% | 9 | 0.06% |
| 1964 | 6,567 | 45.55% | 7,838 | 54.37% | 12 | 0.08% |
| 1968 | 8,705 | 62.04% | 4,364 | 31.10% | 963 | 6.86% |
| 1972 | 9,476 | 67.79% | 4,154 | 29.72% | 349 | 2.50% |
| 1976 | 8,331 | 56.74% | 6,075 | 41.38% | 276 | 1.88% |
| 1980 | 8,994 | 61.23% | 4,660 | 31.72% | 1,035 | 7.05% |
| 1984 | 10,566 | 69.95% | 4,471 | 29.60% | 67 | 0.44% |
| 1988 | 9,077 | 64.58% | 4,871 | 34.65% | 108 | 0.77% |
| 1992 | 7,356 | 44.02% | 5,368 | 32.13% | 3,985 | 23.85% |
| 1996 | 7,354 | 47.03% | 5,912 | 37.81% | 2,370 | 15.16% |
| 2000 | 10,226 | 59.21% | 6,481 | 37.53% | 564 | 3.27% |
| 2004 | 11,573 | 60.78% | 7,351 | 38.61% | 116 | 0.61% |
| 2008 | 10,633 | 54.77% | 8,381 | 43.17% | 401 | 2.07% |
| 2012 | 10,800 | 59.62% | 6,935 | 38.28% | 381 | 2.10% |
| 2016 | 12,891 | 67.69% | 5,123 | 26.90% | 1,029 | 5.40% |
| 2020 | 15,207 | 69.72% | 6,236 | 28.59% | 370 | 1.70% |
| 2024 | 16,114 | 71.71% | 6,093 | 27.11% | 264 | 1.17% |

United States Senate election results for Susquehanna County, Pennsylvania1
| Year | Republican | | Democratic | | Third party(ies) | |
| Year | No. | % | No. | % | No. | % |
|---|---|---|---|---|---|---|
| 1994 | 7,658 | 59.77% | 4,610 | 35.98% | 545 | 4.25% |
| 2000 | 11,205 | 66.12% | 5,344 | 31.54% | 397 | 2.34% |
| 2006 | 7,787 | 51.55% | 7,318 | 48.45% | 0 | 0.00% |
| 2012 | 10,555 | 58.57% | 7,082 | 39.30% | 385 | 2.14% |
| 2018 | 10,112 | 63.53% | 5,521 | 34.69% | 283 | 1.78% |
| 2024 | 15,545 | 69.97% | 6,129 | 27.59% | 542 | 2.44% |

United States Senate election results for Susquehanna County, Pennsylvania3
| Year | Republican | | Democratic | | Third party(ies) | |
| Year | No. | % | No. | % | No. | % |
|---|---|---|---|---|---|---|
| 1992 | 8,396 | 51.16% | 6,914 | 42.13% | 1,102 | 6.71% |
| 1998 | 9,198 | 71.27% | 3,363 | 26.06% | 344 | 2.67% |
| 2004 | 12,273 | 66.39% | 5,238 | 28.34% | 974 | 5.27% |
| 2010 | 9,141 | 65.29% | 4,860 | 34.71% | 0 | 0.00% |
| 2016 | 11,996 | 62.33% | 5,535 | 28.76% | 1,716 | 8.92% |
| 2022 | 11,520 | 66.55% | 5,245 | 30.30% | 546 | 3.15% |

Pennsylvania Gubernatorial election results for Susquehanna County
| Year | Republican | | Democratic | | Third party(ies) | |
| Year | No. | % | No. | % | No. | % |
|---|---|---|---|---|---|---|
| 1970 | 7,120 | 58.11% | 4,484 | 36.60% | 648 | 5.29% |
| 1974 | 7,569 | 62.17% | 4,345 | 35.69% | 261 | 2.14% |
| 1978 | 8,054 | 67.89% | 3,763 | 31.72% | 47 | 0.40% |
| 1982 | 6,999 | 61.36% | 4,313 | 37.81% | 95 | 0.83% |
| 1986 | 6,668 | 55.73% | 5,237 | 43.77% | 60 | 0.50% |
| 1990 | 3,204 | 32.50% | 6,655 | 67.50% | 0 | 0.00% |
| 1994 | 7,499 | 58.39% | 3,973 | 30.93% | 1,372 | 10.68% |
| 1998 | 9,330 | 71.79% | 2,830 | 21.77% | 837 | 6.44% |
| 2002 | 8,175 | 64.25% | 4,244 | 33.35% | 305 | 2.40% |
| 2006 | 6,874 | 45.48% | 8,239 | 54.52% | 0 | 0.00% |
| 2010 | 9,612 | 68.63% | 4,394 | 31.37% | 0 | 0.00% |
| 2014 | 7,805 | 64.48% | 4,300 | 35.52% | 0 | 0.00% |
| 2018 | 10,137 | 64.49% | 5,273 | 33.55% | 309 | 1.97% |
| 2022 | 11,153 | 64.41% | 5,768 | 33.31% | 395 | 2.28% |

As of January 9, 2023, there are 27,049 registered voters in Susquehanna County.

- Republican: 16,538 (61.1%)
- Democratic: 6,856 (25.4%)
- Independent: 2,385 (8.8%)
- Third Party: 1,270 (4.7%)

=== County commissioners ===
- Alan M. Hall, Chairman
- David Darrow, Vice-Chair
- Robert G. McNamara, Commissioner

https://www.susqco.com/departments/county-commissioners

=== Law enforcement ===
As of 2016 all areas in the county use the Pennsylvania State Police (PSP) in a law enforcement capacity, either with part-time police departments or with no other police departments.

=== Row offices ===
- Clerk of Courts and Prothonotary, Jan Krupinski, Republican
- Coroner, Tony Conarton, Republican
- District Attorney, Marion O'Malley, Republican
- Recorder of Deeds and Register of Wills, Michelle Estabrook, Republican
- Sheriff, Lance Benedict, Republican
- Treasurer, Jason Miller, Republican
- Auditor, George Starzec, Republican
- Auditor, Susan Jennings, Democrat

=== State Representatives ===
- Tina Pickett, Republican (110th district) - Apolacon, Auburn, Dimock, Forest Lake, Jessup, Middletown, and Rush Townships, and Little Meadows Borough
- Jonathan Fritz, Republican (111th district) - Ararat, Bridgewater, Brooklyn, Choconut, Clifford, Franklin, Gibson, Great Bend, Harford, Harmony, Herrick, Jackson, Lathrop, Lenox, Liberty, New Milford, Oakland, Silver Lake, Springville, and Thompson Townships, and Friendsville, Great Bend, Hallstead, Hop Bottom, Lanesboro, Montrose, New Milford, Oakland, Susquehanna Depot, Thompson, and Union Dale Boroughs.

=== State Senators ===
- Lisa Baker, Republican (20th district) - Ararat, Auburn, Brooklyn, Clifford, Gibson, Great Bend, Harford, Harmony, Herrick, Jackson, Lathrop, Lenox, New Milford, Oakland, Springville, and Thompson Townships, and Forest City, Great Bend, Hallstead, Hop Bottom, Lanesboro, New Milford, Oakland, Susquehanna Depot, Thompson, and Union Dale Boroughs.
- Gene Yaw, Republican (23rd district) - Apolacon, Bridgewater, Choconut, Dimock, Forest Lake, Franklin, Jessup, Liberty, Middletown, Rush and Silver Lake Townships, and Friendsville, Little Meadows, and Montrose Boroughs.

=== U.S. Representative ===
- Dan Meuser, Republican (PA-09)

=== United States Senate ===
- John Fetterman, Democrat
- David McCormick, Republican

== Economy ==
The economy in the county is mainly made up of retail, health care industry, public school employment, small businesses, and government officials.

=== Major employers ===
2018

Listed in order of number of employees at the end of 2018, according to the Pennsylvania Department of Labor and Industry May 2019 monthly report:

- Montrose Area School District
- Barnes-Kasson County Hospital
- Pennsylvania State Government
- Endless Mountains Health Systems
- Susquehanna County government
- Mountain View School District
- Elk Lake School District
- Gassearch Drilling Services Corp
- Blue Ridge School District
- Cabot Oil & Gas Corporation

2015

- Barnes-Kasson County Hospital
- Montrose Area School District
- Endless Mountains Health Systems
- C & G Construction Inc
- Elk Lake School District
- Susquehanna County government
- Mountain View School District
- Pennsylvania State Government
- Gassearch Drilling Services Corp
- Blue Ridge School District

2014

- Montrose Area School District
- Barnes-Kasson County Hospital
- Gassearch Drilling Services Corp
- Endless Mountains Health Systems
- Elk Lake School District
- Blue Ridge School District
- Susquehanna County government
- Mountain View School District
- Elk Mountain Ski Resort INC
- Forest City Regional School District

=== Natural gas ===
Since unconventional drilling for natural gas began in 2008. According to the U.S. Bureau of Labor Statistics, the unemployment rate in Susquehanna County was 6.1 percent in January 2008. It has since fluctuated between a high of 11.1 percent and a low of 3.1 percent. As of January 2018, the unemployment rate was 5.7 percent. After decades of population growth since the 1950s, the population in Susquehanna County has since begun to decline, concurrent with the expansion of natural gas drilling and accompanying infrastructure. Between 2010 and 2016, there was an estimated population decline of 5.8 percent. As of 2011, there were 1,079 active natural gas wells in the county which had collectively been issued 795 notices of violations by the Department of Environmental Protection of Pennsylvania.

=== Tourism ===
Susquehanna County's natural environment, skiing, and small villages make it a growing tourist destination.

== Education ==
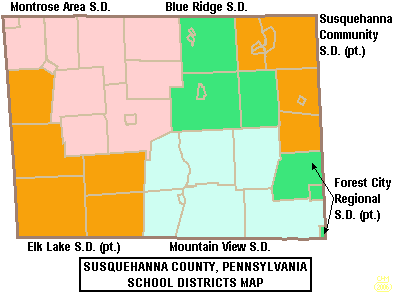
Map of Susquehanna County, Pennsylvania, school districts

=== Public school districts ===
School districts include:

- Blue Ridge School District (New Milford)
- Elk Lake School District (Dimock) (also in Wyoming County)
- Forest City Regional School District (Forest City) (also in Lackawanna and Wayne Counties)
- Montrose Area School District (Montrose)
- Mountain View School District (Kingsley)
- Susquehanna Community School District (also in Wayne County)

=== Public libraries ===
- Susquehanna County Historical Society & Free Library Association
- Pratt Memorial Library
- Forest City Library
- Hallstead Public Library
- Hallstead-Great Bend Library
- Susquehanna Free Library

=== Vocational schools ===
- Susquehanna County Career and Technology Center (Dimock Township)

=== Intermediate unit ===
- Luzerne Intermediate Unit 18

Northeast Intermediate Unit 19 (NEIU 19)

=== Private schools ===
- Faith Mountain Christian Academy (New Milford)

== Transportation ==
=== Major highways ===
- I-81
- US 11
- PA 29
- PA 92
- PA 106
- PA 167
- PA 171
- PA 247
- PA 267
- PA 367
- PA 370
- PA 371
- PA 374
- PA 407
- PA 492
- PA 547
- PA 706
- PA 848
- PA 858

=== Rail ===
Susquehanna County's last mainline passenger train services, through New Milford and Hallstead, ended in January 1970. Since then, freight trains (presently Norfolk Southern) use the railroad line.

=== Air ===
Although Susquehanna County boasts several airstrips, they are strictly recreational. The closest main airports are in Binghamton, New York and Scranton, Pennsylvania.

== Recreation ==
There is one Pennsylvania state park in Susquehanna County:

- Salt Springs State Park is 7 miles (11 km) north of Montrose, just off Pennsylvania Route 29.

The Nature Conservancy manages two protected wildlife areas:

- The Woodbourne Forest and Wildlife Preserve is a 648 acres (262 ha) area located along Route 29 south of Montrose.
- The Florence Shelly Preserve is a 380 acres (150 ha) area located along Route 171 in Thompson Township.

There are nine properties/districts listed on National Register of Historic Places in Susquehanna County, Pennsylvania

== Communities ==
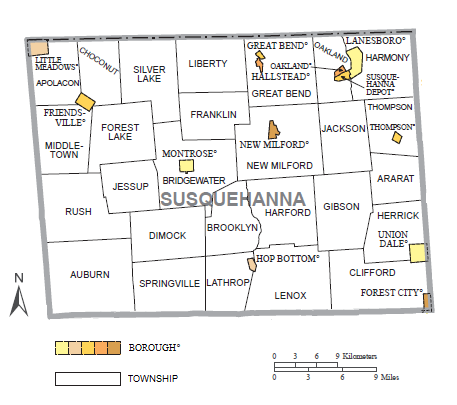
Map of Susquehanna County with municipalities labeled

Under Pennsylvania law, there are four types of incorporated municipalities: cities, boroughs, townships, and, in two cases at most, towns. The following boroughs and townships are located in Susquehanna County:

=== Boroughs ===
- Forest City
- Friendsville
- Great Bend
- Hallstead
- Hop Bottom
- Lanesboro
- Little Meadows
- Montrose (county seat)
- New Milford
- Oakland
- Susquehanna Depot
- Thompson
- Union Dale

=== Townships ===
- Apolacon
- Ararat
- Auburn
- Bridgewater
- Brooklyn
- Choconut
- Clifford
- Dimock
- Forest Lake
- Franklin
- Gibson
- Great Bend
- Harford
- Harmony
- Herrick
- Jackson
- Jessup
- Lathrop
- Lenox
- Liberty
- Middletown
- New Milford
- Oakland
- Rush
- Silver Lake
- Springville
- Thompson

=== Population ranking ===
The population ranking of the following table is based on the 2010 census of Susquehanna County.

† county seat

| Rank | Borough/Township | Municipal type | Population (2010 Census) |
|---|---|---|---|
| 1 | Bridgewater | Township | 2,844 |
| 2 | Clifford | Township | 2,408 |
| 3 | New Milford | Township | 2,042 |
| 4 | Great Bend | Township | 1,949 |
| 5 | Auburn | Township | 1,939 |
| 6 | Lenox | Township | 1,934 |
| 7 | Forest City | Borough | 1,911 |
| 8 | Silver Lake | Township | 1,716 |
| 9 | Susquehanna Depot | Borough | 1,643 |
| 10 | Springville | Township | 1,641 |
| 11 | † Montrose | Borough | 1,617 |
| 12 | Dimock | Township | 1,497 |
| 13 | Harford | Township | 1,430 |
| 14 | Hallstead | Borough | 1,303 |
| 15 | Liberty | Township | 1,292 |
| 16 | Rush | Township | 1,267 |
| 17 | Gibson | Township | 1,221 |
| 18 | Forest Lake | Township | 1,193 |
| 19 | Brooklyn | Township | 963 |
| 20 | Franklin | Township | 937 |
| 21 | New Milford | Borough | 868 |
| 22 | Jackson | Township | 848 |
| 23 | Lathrop | Township | 841 |
| 24 | Great Bend | Borough | 734 |
| 25 | Choconut | Township | 713 |
| 26 | Herrick | Township | 713 |
| 27 | Oakland | Borough | 616 |
| 28 | Oakland | Township | 564 |
| 29 | Ararat | Township | 563 |
| 30 | Jessup | Township | 536 |
| 31 | Harmony | Township | 528 |
| 32 | Lanesboro | Borough | 506 |
| 33 | Apolacon | Township | 500 |
| 34 | Thompson | Township | 410 |
| 35 | Middletown | Township | 382 |
| 36 | Hop Bottom | Borough | 337 |
| 37 | Thompson | Borough | 299 |
| 38 | Little Meadows | Borough | 273 |
| 39 | Union Dale | Borough | 267 |
| 40 | Friendsville | Borough | 111 |

== See also ==
- National Register of Historic Places listings in Susquehanna County, Pennsylvania
- Woodbourne Forest and Wildlife Preserve
