= Thompson Township, Susquehanna County, Pennsylvania =

Township in Pennsylvania, United States

Thompson Township
- Township
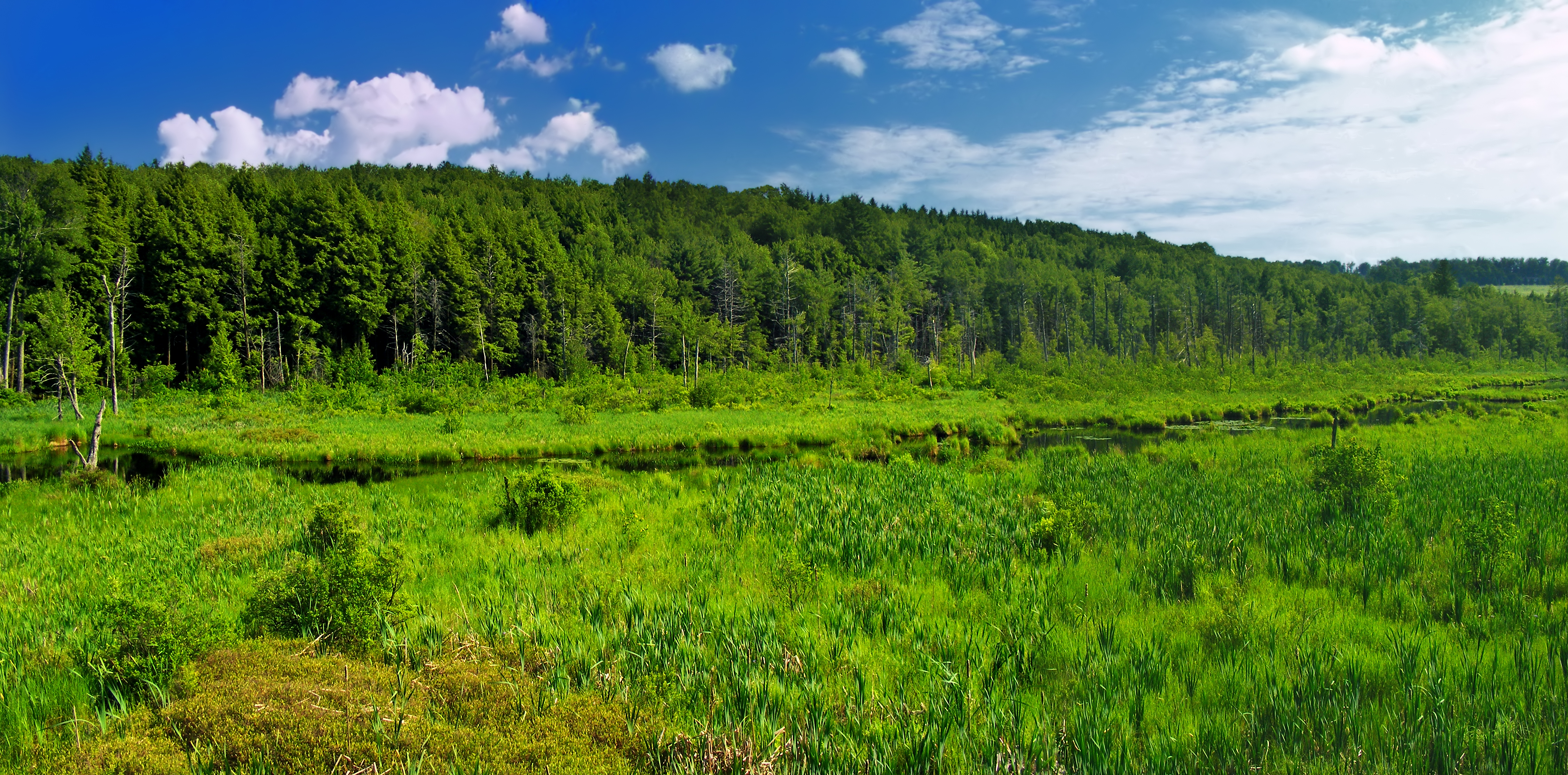
- Plews Swamp in the Florence Shelly Preserve

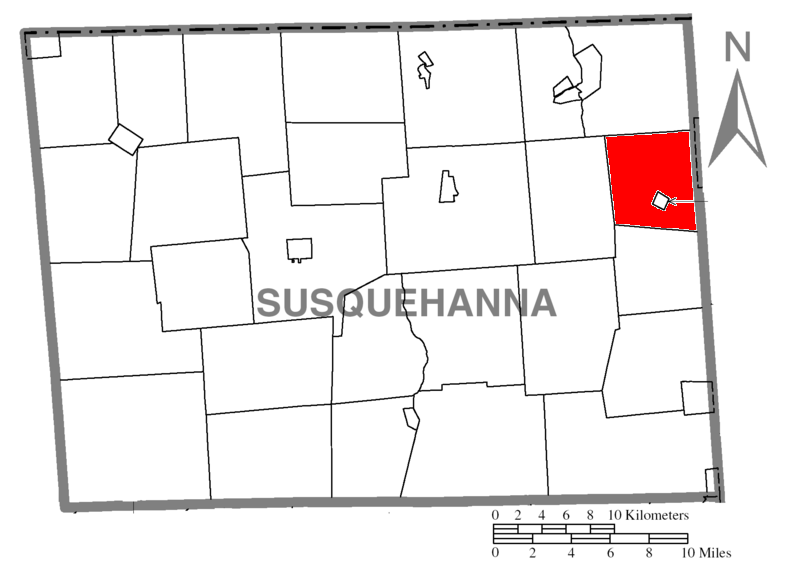

- Location of Pennsylvania in the United States
- Coordinates: 41°52′00″N 75°31′59″W
- Country: United States
- State: Pennsylvania
- County: Susquehanna
- Settled: 1820
- Incorporated: 1833

Area
  - Total: 22.21 sq mi (57.52 km^{2})
  - Land: 21.94 sq mi (56.82 km^{2})
  - Water: 0.27 sq mi (0.70 km^{2})

Population (2020)
  - Total: 440 ▲
  - Estimate (2021): 439
  - Density: 17.7/sq mi (6.85/km^{2})
- Time zone: UTC-5 (EST)
  - Summer (DST): UTC-4 (EDT)
- Zip Code: 18465
- Area code: 570
- FIPS code: 42-115-76504

Thompson Township is a township in Susquehanna County, Pennsylvania, United States. The population was 440 at the 2020 census.

== Geography ==
According to the United States Census Bureau, the township has a total area of 22.17 square miles (57.4 km^{2}), of which 21.9 square miles (57 km^{2}) is land and 0.27 square miles (0.70 km^{2}) (1.22%) is water.

The Florence Shelly Preserve is a protected area along Route 171 in Thompson Township. The 357-acres around Weir's Pond and Plew's Swamp includes woodlands, fields, streams, and a glacial pond with a floating bog. Its nature trails are open to the public year-round.

== History ==
Thompson Township was formed from parts of Jackson Township in April 1833. It was named for Susquehanna County associate judge William Thompson.

== Demographics ==
Historical population
Census	Pop.	Note	%±
2010	410		—
2020	440		7.3%
2021 (est.)	439		−0.2%
U.S. Decennial Census

As of the census of 2010, there were 410 people, 195 households, and 120 families residing in the township. The population density was 18.7 people per square mile (7.2 people/km^{2}). There were 369 housing units at an average density of 16.8 per square mile (6.5/km^{2}). The racial makeup of the township was 98.4% White, 0.2% African American, 0.2% Pacific Islander, 0.2% from other races, and 1% from two or more races. Hispanic or Latino of any race were 1.7% of the population.

There were 195 households, out of which 18.5% had children under the age of 18 living with them, 51.3% were married couples living together, 4.1% had a female householder with no husband present, and 38.5% were non-families. 34.4% of all households were made up of individuals, and 15.3% had someone living alone who was 65 years of age or older. The average household size was 2.10 and the average family size was 2.66.

In the township the population was spread out, with 14.9% under the age of 18, 60% from 18 to 64, and 25.1% who were 65 years of age or older. The median age was 51 years.

The median income for a household in the township was $36,667, and the median income for a family was $56,964. Males had a median income of $41,875 versus $30,417 for females. The per capita income for the township was $26,151. About 4.1% of families and 8% of the population were below the poverty line, including 5.2% of those under age 18 and 12.6% of those age 65 or over.
