= Great Bend, Pennsylvania =

- Borough
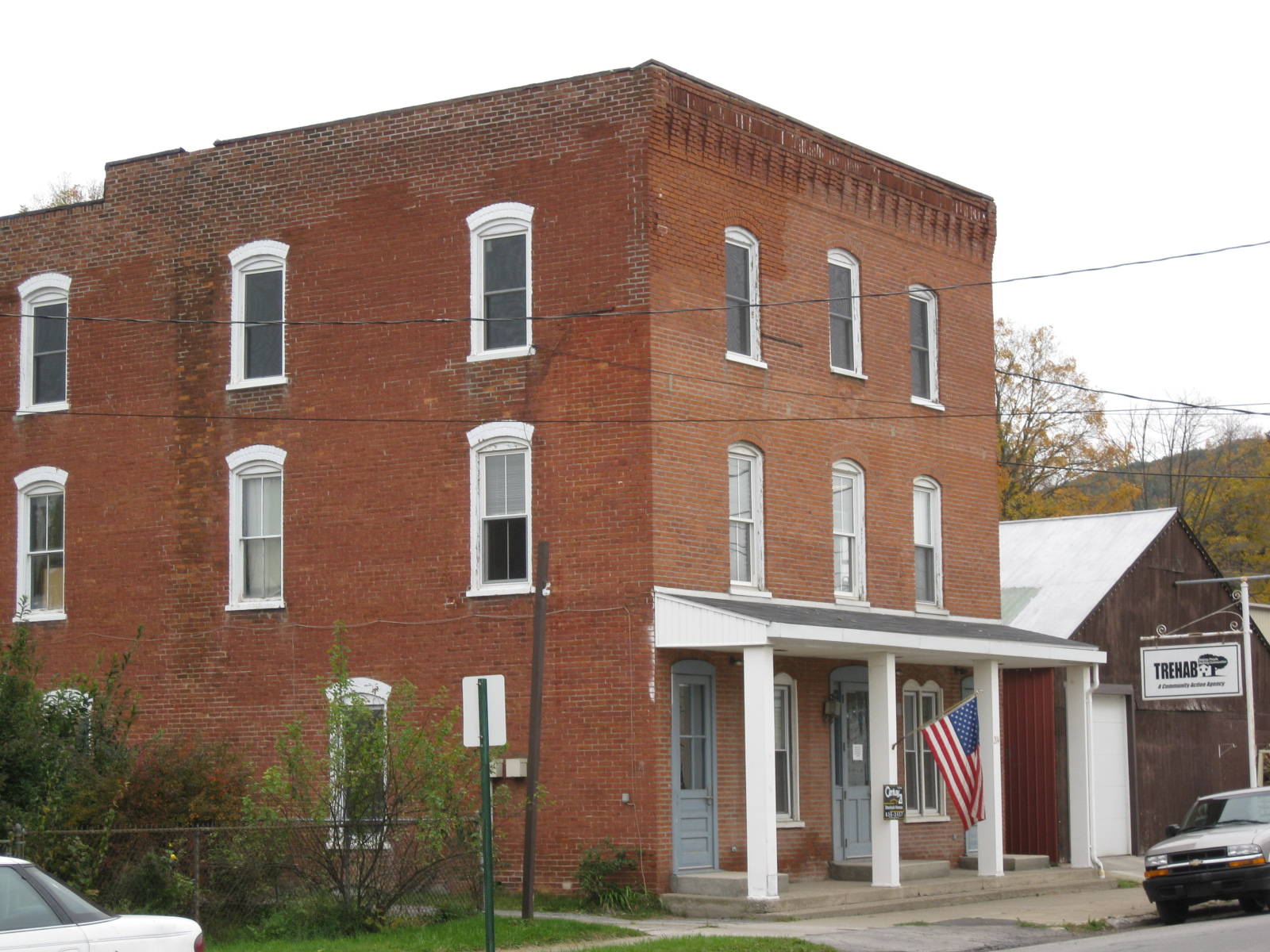
- Great Bend, Pennsylvania

- Location of Great Bend in Susquehanna County, Pennsylvania.

- Location within Pennsylvania Location within the United States
- Coordinates: 41°58′24″N 75°44′40″W
- Country: United States
- State: Pennsylvania
- County: Susquehanna
- Settled: 1862
- Incorporated: 1861

Government
  - Mayor: James W. Riecke

Area
  - Total: 0.32 sq mi (0.82 km^{2})
  - Land: 0.29 sq mi (0.76 km^{2})
  - Water: 0.023 sq mi (0.06 km^{2})

Population (2020)
  - Total: 627
  - Density: 2,145.0/sq mi (828.18/km^{2})
- Time zone: UTC-5 (Eastern (EST))
  - Summer (DST): UTC-4 (EDT)
- Zip code: 18821
- Area code: 570
- FIPS code: 42-30728

Great Bend is a borough in Susquehanna County, Pennsylvania, United States, 39 miles (63 km) north of Scranton. According to 2020 Census data, Great Bend's population was 634, down 13.6% from 2010. Great Bend sits along the Susquehanna River, less than two miles (about 3 km) from the New York State border, and is located directly off Interstate 81. Several small manufacturers also call Great Bend home. Great Bend is considered a bedroom community of the Binghamton, NY metropolitan area. Downtown Binghamton is roughly 11 miles (18 km) from Great Bend. The borough has three public parks. Billy Greenwood Memorial Park on Kilrow Avenue and Veterans' Memorial Park on Spring St. overlook the Susquehanna River. Great Bend is within the Blue Ridge School District.

== History ==
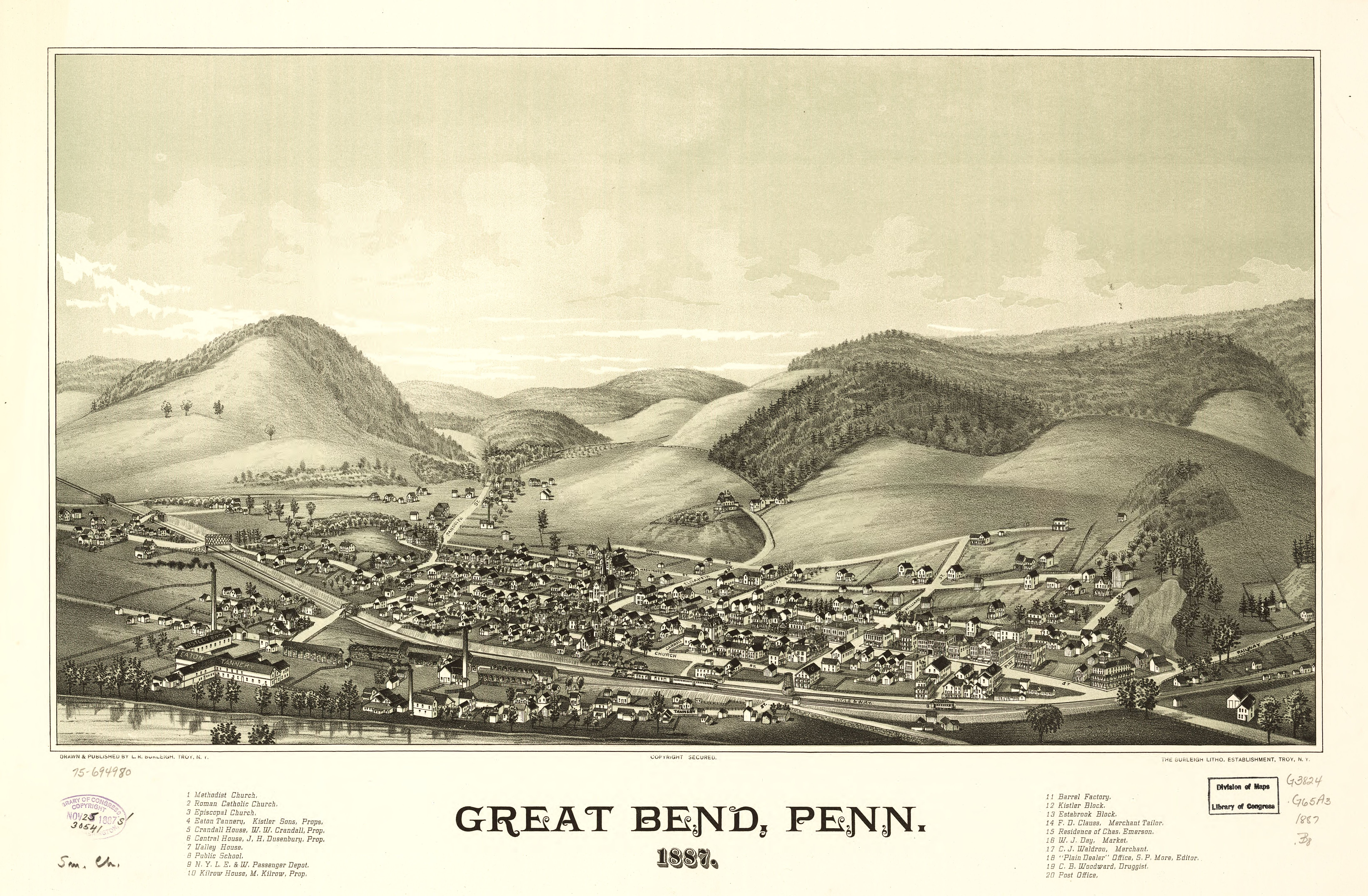
Perspective map of Great Bend with list of landmarks published in 1887 by L.R Burleigh

Great Bend Borough was incorporated on November 19, 1861, from parts of Great Bend Township. Great Bend was named from a bend in the Susquehanna River.

== Geography ==
Great Bend is located at 41°58′24″N 75°44′40″W (41.973226, -75.744376).

According to the United States Census Bureau, the borough has a total area of 0.3 square miles (0.78 km^{2}), all land.

== Demographics ==
Historical population
Census	Pop.	Note	%±
1870	855		—
1880	1,136		32.9%
1890	1,002		−11.8%
1900	836		−16.6%
1910	788		−5.7%
1920	666		−15.5%
1930	582		−12.6%
1940	742		27.5%
1950	751		1.2%
1960	777		3.5%
1970	826		6.3%
1980	740		−10.4%
1990	704		−4.9%
2000	700		−0.6%
2010	734		4.9%
2020	627		−14.6%
2021 (est.)	632	▲	0.8%

As of the census of 2010, there were 734 people, 341 households, and 194 families residing in the borough. The population density was 2,446.7 inhabitants per square mile (944.7/km^{2}). There were 369 housing units at an average density of 1,230 per square mile (470/km^{2}). The racial makeup of the borough was 97.7% White, 0.4% Asian, 0.3% some other race, and 1.6% two or more races. Hispanic or Latino of any race composed 1.4% of the population.

There were 341 households, out of which 22.6% had children under the age of 18 living with them, 41.1% were married couples living together, 10% had a female householder with no husband present, and 43.1% were non-families. 36.1% of all households were made up of individuals, and 18.5% had someone living alone who was 65 years of age or older. The average household size was 2.15 and the average family size was 2.74.

In the borough the population was spread out, with 19.8% under the age of 18, 59.1% from 18 to 64, and 21.1% who were 65 years of age or older. The median age was 46 years.

The median income for a household in the borough was $41,776, and the median income for a family was $52,381. Males had a median income of $33,750 versus $29,138 for females. The per capita income for the borough was $21,634. About 1.2% of families and 6.3% of the population were below the poverty line, including 3.5% of those under age 18 and 8.9% of those age 65 or over.

== Notable people ==
- Charles L. Catlin, Wisconsin state legislator and lawyer, was born in Great Bend.
- Fanny DuBois Chase (1828–1902), social reformer and author
- Sylvia Dubois (1778/89 - 1888), African-American woman born into slavery, became free after striking her mistress while living in Great Bend
- Ray Kellogg (1919–1981), film and television actor
