= Blue Ridge High School (Pennsylvania) =

School in Pennsylvania, US

Coordinates: 41.89846°N 75.73652°W

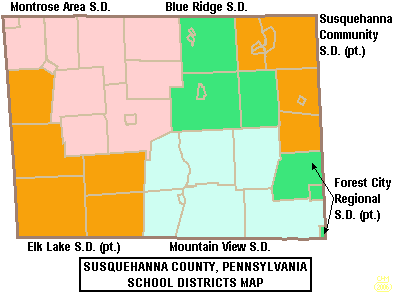

Location
- 5058 School Road; New Milford, Susquehanna County, Pennsylvania 18834; United States of America

Information
- School type: Public high school
- School district: Blue Ridge School District
- Principal: Casey Webster
- Teaching staff: 25.45 (FTE)
- Grades: 9-12
- Student to teacher ratio: 11.67
- Website: https://ms-hs.brsd.org/

Blue Ridge High School is a small, rural public high school located in New Milford, Susquehanna County, Pennsylvania. It is the sole high school operated by Blue Ridge School District. In 2015, enrollment was reported as 315 pupils in 9th through 12th grades. The school employed 29 teachers.

== Extracurriculars ==
The Blue Ridge School District offers a wide variety of clubs, activities and an extensive sports program. The school offers the following clubs: National Honor Society, Student Council, Leo Club and Middle School and High School Yearbook. Students can earn one English credit working on the yearbook.

=== Sports ===
The district funds:

Varsity

Boys

- Baseball - A
- Basketball- AA
- Cross country - A
- Golf - AA
- Soccer - A
- Track and field - AA
- Volleyball - AA
- Wrestling - AA

Girls

- Basketball - AA
- Cross country - A
- Soccer (fall) - A
- Softball - A
- Track and field - AA
- Volleyball - A

Middle school sports

Boys

- Baseball
- Basketball
- Cross country
- Soccer
- Track and field
- Wrestling

Girls

- Basketball
- Cross country
- Softball
- Track and field

According to PIAA directory July 2015
