= Mary Alice (disambiguation) =

Mary Alice (1936–2022) was an American actress.

Mary Alice may also refer to:

== People ==
- Mary Alice Barton (1917–2003), American quilter, quilt historian, collector, and philanthropist
- Mary Alice Blair (1880–1962), New Zealand doctor during World War I
- Mary Alice Butts (1924–2004), Canadian politician
- Mary Alice Chrnalogar, American author
- Mary Alice Coffroth (born 1954), American marine biologist and professor
- Mary-Alice Daniel (born 1986), Nigerian-American writer
- Maryalice Demler (born 1964), American television journalist and news anchor
- Mary Alice Dorrance Malone (1950–2025), American billionaire and heiress to the Campbell's fortune
- Mary Alice Douglas (1860–1941), English educator
- Mary Alice Downie (born 1934), American-born Canadian writer
- Mary Alice Dwyer-Dobbin, American television producer
- Mary Alice Eleanor Richards (1885–1977), Welsh botanist
- Mary Alice Evatt (1898–1973), Australian artist, art patron, arts advocate, and political activist
- Mary Alice Faid (1897–1990), Scottish writer of children's books
- Mary Alice Fontenot (1910–2003), American author of regional children's books
- Mary Alice Ford (1935–2008), American politician
- Mary Alice Frush, American nurse during the American Civil War
- Mary Alice Hadley (1911–1965), American artist
- Mary Alice Haney, American fashion designer
- Mary Alice Hearrell Murray (1875–1938), American- and Chickasaw former First Lady of Oklahoma
- Mary Alice Heinbach (1854–1928), American woman known for a legal struggle to retain possession of land
- Mary Alice Herbert (1935–2021), American schoolteacher and politician
- Mary Alice Holman (1893–1939), Australian politician
- Mary Alice Jones (1898–1980), American author of children's religious books
- Mary Alice Lair, American politician
- Mary Alice McWhinnie (1922–1980), American biologist and professor
- Mary Alice Monroe, American novelist
- Mary Alice Peck (1855–1943), Canadian craftwork artist
- Mary Alice Powell Lindsay (1883–1979), American nurse
- Mary Alice Purcell, birth name of La Wilson (1926–2018), American artist
- Mary Alice Quinn (1920–1935), American girl who died at age 14 from a chronic heart condition
- Mary Alice Relf, American girl who was involuntarily sterilized via tubal ligation in 1973
- Mary Alice Rich, American composer
- Mary Alice Sarvis (1914–1965), American psychiatrist and psychoanalyst
- Mary Alice Scully (1902–1978), American screenwriter
- Mary Alice Seymour (1837–1897), American musician, author, elocutionist, and critic
- Mary Alice Siem (c. 1950–?), American university student who partook in a prisoner outreach program
- Mary Alice Stollak, American founder and director of the Michigan State University Children's Choir
- Mary Alice Thatch (1943–2021), American newspaper editor
- Mary Alice Tieche Smith (1918–1987), American former First Lady of West Virginia
- Mary Alice Vignola (born 1998), American NWSL player
- Mary Alice Ward (1896–1972), Australian teacher and pastoralist
- Mary-Alice Waters, American socialist, feminist, journalist, and activist
- Mary Alice Willcox (1856–1953), American zoologist and professor
- Mary Alice Williams (born 1949), American pioneering journalist and broadcast executive

== Fictional characters ==
- Mary Alice Young, in the US comedy-drama mystery TV series Desperate Housewives, played by Brenda Strong

== Other uses ==
- Mary Alice, Kentucky, a community in Harlan County, Kentucky
- USS Mary Alice (SP-397), a United States Navy patrol vessel

== See also ==
- Mary Allis (1899–1987), American dealer of art and antiques
- Marie-Alice, a list of people with the given name
