= Heinbach v Heinbach =

Heinbach v Heinbach, a court case in the early 1910s, was between Mary Alice "Mollie" Heinbach and Jesse Heinbach to probate the will of Jesse's father and Mary's husband, Samuel "Sam" Heinbach. Samuel's will gave Mary a tract of land near the Atlas Portland Cement Company in Ilasco, Missouri, just outside Hannibal. Sam's children argued that Mary had undue influence over him and the will, pointing to his alcoholism and deteriorating health. This case went to the Supreme Court of Missouri numerous times before it was resolved. This case was well documented in the book, Insane Sisters: Or, the Price Paid for Challenging a Company Town, by Gregg Andrews.

== Background ==
Samuel Heinbach wrote his will on September 27, 1909, before he died January 3, 1910, in Ralls County, MO. His will left a 26-acre tract of land in Mary's name in an area that Atlas was trying to take control of. He left his property to Mary instead of his children because he felt she was there for him when his children had abandoned him. A local attorney, J.O. Allison contacted Sam's children and asked for a portion of the lot if he could overturn the will. They accepted and the will was rejected by Judge T.E. Allison, J.O's brother on the grounds that Samuel's alcoholism made him not of sound mind, and open to Mary's undue influence.

== Literature ==
Gregg Andrews wrote 2 books documenting this case, and others like it in Ilasco, Ralls County, MO. Ilasco ceased to exist in 1960 due to economic trouble caused by the Atlas Portland Cement Company. Because both his father and grandfather were employed by Atlas, it influenced him to write about the cement town run by the company and the social issues that occurred.

=== Books ===
- City of Dust: A Cement Company Town in the Land of Tom Sawyer. Paperback ed. Columbia, Mo.: University of Missouri Press, 2002. ISBN 0-8262-1424-X
- Insane Sisters: Or, the Price Paid for Challenging a Company Town. Columbia, Mo.: University of Missouri Press, 1999. ISBN 0-8262-1240-9
- Women in Missouri History: In Search of Power and Influence. Paperback ed. Columbia, Mo.: University of Missouri Press, 2004. ISBN 978-0-8262-1526-0
