= WRGG-LP =

- Greencastle, Pennsylvania; United States
- Broadcast area: Greencastle; Antrim Township; Waynecastle
- Frequency: 93.7 MHz
- Branding: WRGG 93.7 FM

Programming
- Format: Full-service and oldies

Ownership
- Owner: WRGG Good Companion Radio

History
- First air date: June 14, 2016

Technical information
- Licensing authority: FCC
- Facility ID: 197436
- Class: L1
- ERP: 29 watts
- HAAT: 55 meters (180 ft)
- Transmitter coordinates: 39°47′28.66″N 77°40′30.03″W

Links
- Public license information: LMS
- Webcast: Listen live
- Website: www.wrgg.org

WRGG-LP is a full-service and oldies broadcast radio station licensed to Greencastle, Pennsylvania, serving Greencastle, Antrim Township, and southern Franklin County in Pennsylvania. WRGG-LP is owned and operated by WRGG Good Companion Radio.

== History ==
The Greencastle-Antrim Education Foundation filed its application for a construction permit with the Federal Communications Commission (FCC), to begin the process of building WRGG-LP, on February 19, 2014. A significant grant from The Shockey Family Foundation allowed the station to quickly begin construction. A "license to cover" was granted by the FCC on June 7, 2016, allowing WRGG-LP to begin broadcasting. The station broadcast for the first time on June 14, 2016. Greencastle Mayor Robert E. Eberly was featured on the station's first day of programming, "congratulat[ing] the radio committee and others involved in the station's startup".

Many aspects of WRGG-LP come from former Greencastle station WKSL, now WQCM. The original idea for a community radio station came from the former town radio station WKSL. WKSL carried a "good companion" format, which featured Country Music and Christian radio shows. The transmitting antenna for WRGG-LP was placed on the former broadcast tower of WKSL. Ben Thomas, Sr., the father of WRGG-LP committee member and co-founder Ben Thomas, Jr., founded WKSL in 1969. Fellow committee members and co-founders Wade Burkholder, who was one of the original staff members of WKSL, and Dr. C. Gregory Hoover, retired Superintendent of Schools for the Greencastle-Antrim School District, trace their radio roots to WKSL.

WRGG-LP's license has since been transferred to WRGG Good Companion Radio.

== Programming ==
The station features "hyperlocal" news, sports, community events and information from a team of volunteers. Along with the emphasis on news, sports and information, an Oldies format, with music from the 1950s, 60s and 70's is featured. The station also features "speciality shows" after 6:00 pm which includes locally produced programs featuring a wide variety of music and talk shows.

== Location ==
The studios of WRGG-LP, located at 113 South Carlisle Street in Greencastle, were donated to the Greencastle-Antrim Education Foundation by committee member and co-founder Wade Burkholder and his wife Linda.

== See also ==
- List of community radio stations in the United States
