= Ilasco =

Ilasco may refer to:

- Ilasco, Missouri, an unincorporated community in Ralls County, Missouri, United States
  - Ilasco Historic District, its national historic district
- Menardo Ilasco Guevarra (born 1954), Filipino lawyer and public servant
