= Mason Dixon =

Mason Dixon may refer to:

- Mason–Dixon line separating Delaware and Pennsylvania from Maryland, surveyed 1763–1767
- Mason & Dixon, the 1997 novel by Thomas Pynchon featuring the surveyors as characters
- Mason and Dixon, Pennsylvania, an unincorporated community
- Mason-Dixon Trail, hiking trail along the line
- Mason-Dixon Polling & Research Inc., an independent polling firm
- Mason Dixon (band), a country music band from the 1980s
- Mason Dixon (Rocky Balboa character), a fictional character in the Rocky series
- Sailing to Philadelphia, title track drawn from the 1997 novel Mason & Dixon by Thomas Pynchon
