= Mary Alice Heinbach =

Mary Alice Heinbach (born 9 June 1854, Pennsylvania; d. 23 January 1928, in Ilasco, Missouri) became known for a seventeen-year legal struggle, together with her sister Euphemia B. Koller (nicknamed "Feemy"), to retain possession of land she inherited in 1910 from her late husband, Sam M. Heinbach, in Ilasco. Atlas Portland Cement Company, the major industry in town, wanted to buy the land, which comprised much of the unincorporated town site.

After the case reached the Missouri State Supreme Court four times, it resulted in the county probate court placing a guardianship over Heinbach in 1921. It asserted that she was incapable of managing the land. A circuit court judge ordered a sheriff's sale of the land to Atlas Portland Cement Company, which virtually ran the town and had wanted to acquire the property from the beginning of the litigation.

Koller tried to overturn the sale and expose the political complexities of the town. In 1927 the court ordered her to be confined to Missouri's State Hospital Number One for the Insane. She was held here until her death at age sixty-eight.

== Background ==
Mary Alice "Mollie" Scott, widow of John M. Scott in Bowling Green, Missouri, married again to Sam Heinbach of Ilasco, Missouri in December 1908. (Andrews, p. 49)

She and her sister, Euphemia B. Koller (nicknamed "Feemy"), became involved in the Heinbach v Heinbach court case to retain possession of a plot of land that Mary's late husband, Samuel "Sam" Heinbach, had left her. They were fighting against Atlas Portland Cement Company, the major business in the small town.

Koller had acquired considerable legal expertise and acted as an ad hoc attorney as she and her sister litigated this case with hired male attorneys. She took depositions, lined up witnesses, and developed strategy for her sister's case against the protests of their attorneys.
