= Marie-Alice =

Marie-Alice is a feminine compound given name which may refer to:

- Mary-Alice Daniel (born 1986), Nigerian-born American writer and poet
- Marie-Alice Dumont (1892–1985), Canadian photographer
- Marie-Alice Théard (born 1948), Haitian writer and editor
- Marie-Alice Yahé (born 1984), French former rugby union footballer

== See also ==
- Mary Alice (disambiguation), including a list of people named Mary Alice [surname]
- Marie Alice Heine (1857–1925), American-born Princess of Monaco
- Marie-Alise Recasner (born 1962), American soap opera actress
