= Spring Grove Farm and Distillery =

- U.S. National Register of Historic Places
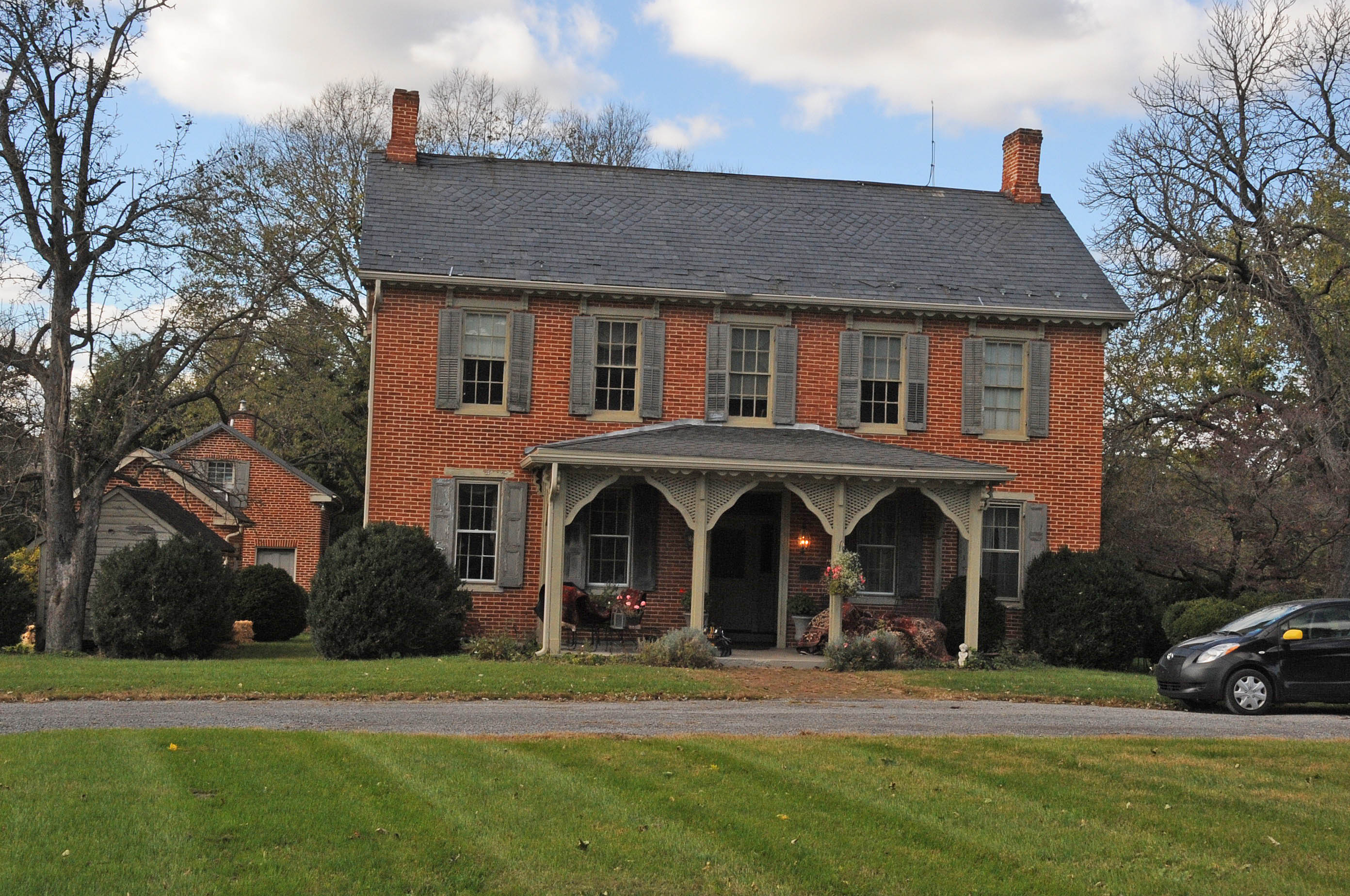

- Location within Pennsylvania Location within the United States
- Location: Northwest of Greencastle on Williamsport Pike, Antrim Township, Pennsylvania
- Coordinates: 39°45′33″N 77°45′31″W
- Area: 4.6 acres (1.9 ha)
- Built: 1867
- Built by: Robert Johnston
- Architectural style: Greek Revival, Other, Transitional Greek Revival
- NRHP reference No.: 79002229
- Added to NRHP: August 10, 1979

The Spring Grove Farm and Distillery is an historic farm complex and distillery site that is located in Antrim Township in Franklin County, Pennsylvania, USA.

It was listed on the National Register of Historic Places in 1979.

== History and architectural features ==
The house in this historic property was built in 1867, and is a two-story, T-shaped, brick dwelling that was designed in the Greek Revival style. Also located on the property are a contributing two-story, four-bay brick building that is believed by historians to have housed a cooper's shop and residence; a brick summer kitchen, a brick smoke house, a frame pumphouse, a large brick end bank barn with a slate roof, a frame wagon shed, a brick carriage house, a stone mill (1803) and the site of the Spring Grove Distillery. The distiller ceased to operate in 1920.
