= Gregg Andrews =

American singer-songwriter

Gregg Andrews (born 1950) is a professor of history and labor historian at Texas State University. Additionally, he is assistant director of the Center for Texas Music History and assistant director and co-editor of the Journal of Texas Music History. Andrews is also an accomplished folk musician, performing and recording under the pseudonym "Doctor G" alongside his band, The Mudcats.

== Early life ==
Andrews was born in Ilasco, Missouri, to Maurice and Virginia Andrews (now Virginia Sudholt) in 1950. He grew up in Monkey Run, an unincorporated neighborhood of Ilasco literally "on the wrong side of the tracks" (the two towns were separated by railroad tracks). A largely immigrant community, Ilasco was a suburb of Hannibal, Missouri, and was also the location of the cave made famous in Mark Twain's classic novel, The Adventures of Tom Sawyer.

Ilasco (which ceased to exist in the 1960s) had a population of about 3,000 in 1900, but economic changes had greatly decreased the town's size by mid-century. Andrews' father and grandfather both worked at the Atlas Portland Cement Co. (now Continental Cement) plant. The economic hardships of the town, along with the rhythm of life near a cement factory, deeply influenced Andrews.

At the age of 14, Andrews' father taught him to play the guitar and sing. For eight months, Andrews also took guitar lessons from Maceo Wilson, a local musician famous in Hannibal.

Andrews' father died in 1965.

== Academic career ==
Andrews obtained a Ph.D. in 1988 from Northern Illinois University. From 1985 to 1987, Andrews received an Andrew Mellon Predoctoral Teaching Fellowship in the Humanities from the Illinois Institute of Technology.

In 1988, Andrews won appointment as an assistant professor at Texas State. He rose to the rank of full professor, and now is also assistant director of the Center for Texas Music History and assistant director and co-editor of the Journal of Texas Music History.

Andrews is married to Victoria Bynum, who is also a professor of history at Texas State.

== Research focus ==
Andrews' research work has been varied, but more recently has focused on the social history of work and labor.

Andrews' first book, Shoulder to Shoulder? The American Federation of Labor, the United States, and the Mexican Revolution, 1910–1924, published in 1991, was an important re-assessment of the role Samuel Gompers and the American Federation of Labor played in shaping American policy toward revolutionary movements in Latin America. From 1910 to 1924, Andrews found, Gompers and other labor leaders supported Mexican workers in their struggle for social justice, but advocated Mexican economic dependence on the United States. The book was called "an important key to understanding the ongoing relationship between the labor movement and actions of the United States in Central America" and "a skillful blend of labor and diplomatic history." The book won the Phi Alpha Theta Best Book Award for the first book by a new author.

Andrews used his personal history as a jumping-off point for his next book, Insane Sisters: Or, the Price Paid for Challenging a Company Town, published in 1999. The book illustrated the battle Mary Heinbach and her sister, Euphemia Koller, waged against the Atlas Portland Cement Company in Ilasco. The dispute over property rights spanned 17 years and landed in the Supreme Court of Missouri four times. The dispute ended when Mary was declared incompetent in 1921 and Euphemia pronounced insane in 1929. The company subsequently was able to acquire clear title to their property. The main thrust of the book is an analysis of the changing role of women at the beginning of the 20th century, the development of mental health law, and the collusion of business and governmental interest during the Progressive Era.

Andrews' most recent work, City of Dust: A Cement Company Town in the Land of Tom Sawyer (2002), is his most noted. City of Dust made a significant contribution to the social and industrial history of the trans-Mississippi West.

Andrews' pioneering social history focuses needed attention on a group of workers and an industry that labor historians and others have previously neglected. The author's description of the work process involved in cement manufacture, and the terrible toll on the workers of the industry’s accidents and diseases, alone provide little-known, valuable information.

City of Dust is primarily a social history of cement workers, but it also sheds light on issues of class, industrialism, immigration, labor, and the working-class.

Andrews has continued to mine his personal past to investigate history. His current research projects include a study of the Texas labor movement during the Great Depression, research into the role played by African Americans in the Galveston longshoremen's strike of 1920, and the struggle of black trade unionists to overcome the racially discriminatory practices of the Texas State Federation of Labor.

== Music career ==
Under the name "Doctor G," Andrews is also an accomplished and published singer, songwriter and musician. He is a regular performer at the Cheatham Street Warehouse, a San Marcos music venue where country-western singer George Strait first found fame. Andrews' music is a mixture of folk, Southern rock and blues, and his lyrics speak of forbidden love, the need for respect, the search for happiness, and the toll poverty and hard work have on people. In many respects, Andrews' music reflects his scholarly concerns with the poor, social justice, the working class and the struggle for dignity and respect in the face of economic hardship.

Andrews' band, "Doctor G and the Mudcats," released their debut CD, Mudcat, in September 2005. The record was released on Cheatham Street Records, the independent record label founded by Cheatham Street Warehouse owner Kent Finlay.

== Memberships and honors ==
=== Honors ===
Andrews was assistant director of the NEH Summer Environmental History Institute at Texas State in 1991, and in 2001 received a National Endowment for the Humanities Fellowship.

In 1998, Andrews received the Excellence in Teaching Award from the College of Liberal Arts at Texas State. Four years later, he received a Texas State University Faculty Award for Scholarly and Creative Activity.

In 2002, Andrews was named a Mary M. Hughes Fellow for the Texas State Historical Association.

=== Memberships ===
Andrews has served as a manuscript reviewer at Texas A&M University Press, the University of Missouri Press, and the University of Illinois Press. He has also served as an editor for the journals Diplomatic History, the Journal of Iberian and Latin American Studies, and the International Review of Social History.

Andrews is currently a member of the board of directors of the Texas Heritage Songwriters Association. He is also a member of the Texas State Historical Association, Southwest Labor Studies Association, Organization of American Historians, and Southern Historical Association.

From 2000 to 2002, Andrews was Southwest Chapter president of the Texas Faculty Association.

=== Writing awards ===
Andrews has also won a number of writing awards. In 1993, his book Shoulder to Shoulder? won the Phi Alpha Theta Best Book Award for the first book by a new author. The same year, he was co-recipient of the Harvey L. Johnson Award for the best article in Latin American history. The award, given by Southwest Council of Latin American Studies, honored him for the article "Robert Haberman, Socialist Ideology, and the Politics of National Reconstruction in Mexico, 1920-25," which appeared in the journal Mexican Studies/Estudios Mexicanos.

He has twice won the James Neal Primm Award, a prize give by the Missouri Historical Society for the best article in its journal, Gateway Heritage. Andrews was first honored in 1995 for his article "From Robber Caves to Robber Barons: New South Missouri and the Social Construction of Mark Twain, 1910-1935." He won again the next year, for his article "Ilasco Cement Workers and the War on Booze in Ralls County, Missouri, 1903-1914."

== Publications ==
=== Solely authored books ===
- Shoulder to Shoulder? The American Federation of Labor, the United States, and the Mexican Revolution, 1910–1924. Berkeley, Calif.: University of California Press, 1991. ISBN 0-520-07230-8
- Insane Sisters: Or, the Price Paid for Challenging a Company Town. Columbia, Mo.: University of Missouri Press, 1999. ISBN 0-8262-1240-9
- City of Dust: A Cement Company Town in the Land of Tom Sawyer. Paperback ed. Columbia, Mo.: University of Missouri Press, 2002. ISBN 0-8262-1424-X
- Thyra J. Edwards: Black Activist in the Global Freedom Struggle Columbia, Mo.: University of Missouri Press, 2011.

=== Solely authored articles ===
- "Robert Haberman, Socialist Ideology, and the Politics of National Reconstruction in Mexico, 1920-25." Mexican Studies/Estudios Mexicanos. 6 (Summer 1990).
- "From Robber Caves to Robber Barons: New South Missouri and the Social Construction of Mark Twain, 1910-1935." Gateway Heritage. 15 (December 1994).
- "Immigrant Cement Workers: The Strike of 1910 in Ilasco, Missouri." Missouri Historical Review. 89:2 (January 1995).
- "Ilasco Cement Workers and the War on Booze in Ralls County, Missouri, 1903-1914." Gateway Heritage. 16 (Spring 1996).
- "It's the Music: Kent Finlay's Cheatham Street Warehouse in San Marcos, Texas." Journal of Texas Music History. 5:1 (Spring 2005).
