= Antrim Township, Pennsylvania =

Township in Pennsylvania, US

Coordinates: 39°44′00″N 77°42′59″W

Antrim Township, Franklin County, Pennsylvania
- Township
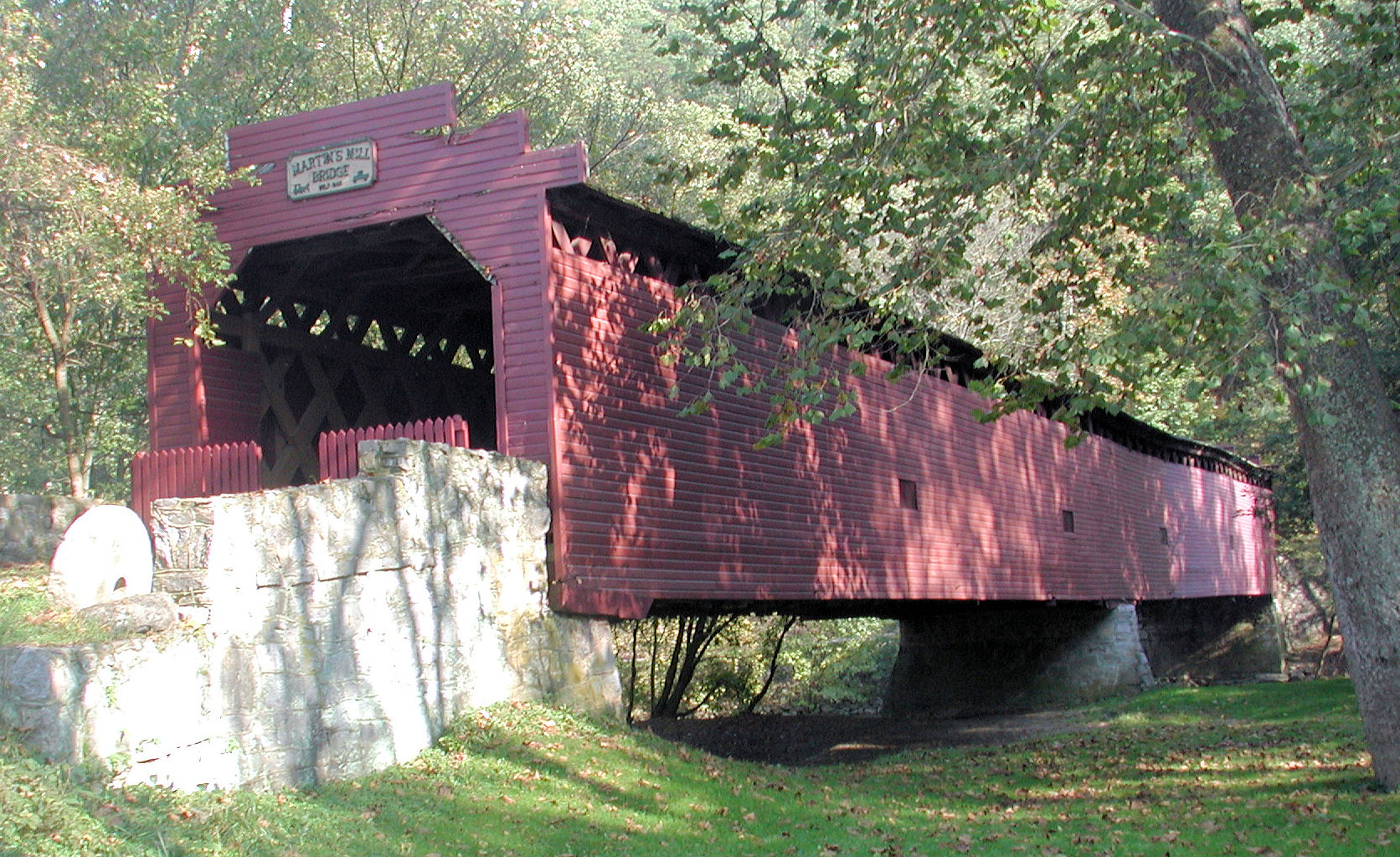
- Martin's Mill Covered Bridge over Conococheague Creek

- Seal
- Nickname: Greencastle-Antrim
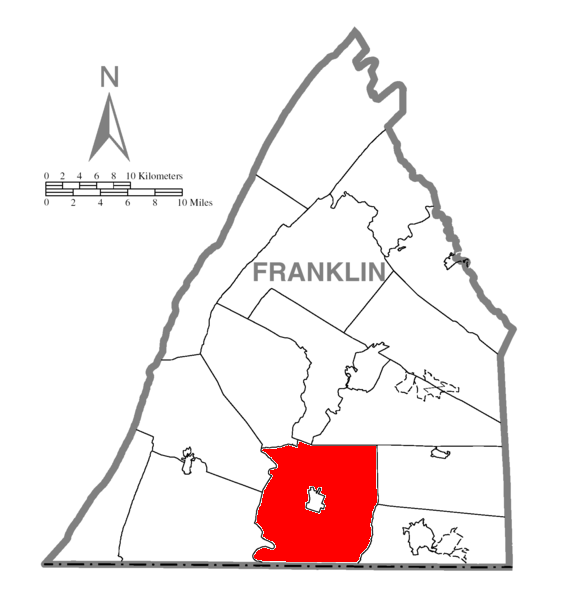
- Map of Franklin County, Pennsylvania highlighting Antrim Township

- Map of Franklin County, Pennsylvania
- Country: United States
- State: Pennsylvania
- County: Franklin
- Settled: 1735
- Incorporated: 1741

Government
  - Type: Board of Supervisors
  - Administrator: Chris Ardinger
  - Supervisors: M Chad Murray, Fred Young III, M Patrick Heraty, Rick Baer, John Alleman

Area
  - Total: 70.16 sq mi (181.71 km^{2})
  - Land: 70.09 sq mi (181.53 km^{2})
  - Water: 0.069 sq mi (0.18 km^{2})

Population (2020)
  - Total: 15,778
  - Density: 225.1/sq mi (86.92/km^{2})
- Time zone: UTC−5 (Eastern (EST))
  - Summer (DST): UTC−4 (EDT)
- Area code: 717
- FIPS code: 42-055-02696
- Website: www.twp.antrim.pa.us

Antrim Township is a township in Franklin County, Pennsylvania, United States. The population was 15,778 at the 2020 census, an increase over the figure of 12,504 tabulated in 2000. It was named after County Antrim in Northern Ireland.

== History ==
The Martin's Mill Covered Bridge, Old Brown's Mill School, Spring Grove Farm and Distillery, and Stover–Winger Farm are listed on the National Register of Historic Places.

== Geography ==
Antrim Township lies along the southern edge of Franklin County, bordered to the south by Washington County in Maryland. The township entirely surrounds the borough of Greencastle, a separate municipality. The unincorporated community of State Line sits along the southern edge of the township. Other unincorporated communities in the township include Bushtown, Coseytown, Worleytown, Milnor, Johnston, Kauffman, Browns Mills, Clay Hill, Shady Grove, Waynecastle, and Wingerton.

U.S. Route 11 and Interstate 81 cross the township, leading north to Chambersburg, the county seat, and south to Hagerstown, Maryland. I-81 has three exits (numbers 1, 3, and 5) in the township. Pennsylvania Route 16 runs at right angles to the other two highways, leading east to Waynesboro and west to Mercersburg.

According to the United States Census Bureau, the township has a total area of 70.2 square miles (181.7 km^{2}), of which 70.1 square miles (181.5 km^{2}) is land and 0.1 square miles (0.2 km^{2}), or 0.10%, is water. Conococheague Creek, a south-flowing tributary of the Potomac River, forms the western boundary of the township in two places.

== Demographics ==
Historical population
Census	Pop.	Note	%±
2000	12,504		—
2010	14,893		19.1%
2020	15,778		5.9%
2021 (est.)	15,723		−0.3%
U.S. Decennial Census

As of the census of 2000, there were 12,504 people, 4,472 households, and 3,640 families residing in the township. The population density was 178.5 inhabitants per square mile (68.9/km^{2}). There were 4,598 housing units at an average density of 65.6 per square mile (25.3/km^{2}). The racial makeup of the township was 97.91% White, 0.78% African American, 0.25% Native American, 0.29% Asian, 0.24% from other races, and 0.54% from two or more races. Hispanic or Latino of any race were 0.78% of the population.

There were 4,472 households, out of which 38.3% had children under the age of 18 living with them, 71.9% were married couples living together, 5.9% had a female householder with no husband present, and 18.6% were non-families. 15.1% of all households were made up of individuals, and 5.6% had someone living alone who was 65 years of age or older. The average household size was 2.79 and the average family size was 3.10.

In the township the population was spread out, with 27.6% under the age of 18, 6.9% from 18 to 24, 31.2% from 25 to 44, 23.9% from 45 to 64, and 10.4% who were 65 years of age or older. The median age was 36 years. For every 100 females, there were 98.9 males. For every 100 females age 18 and over, there were 96.9 males.

The median income for a household in the township was $46,050, and the median income for a family was $49,632. Males had a median income of $34,884 versus $22,035 for females. The per capita income for the township was $18,590. About 4.1% of families and 4.1% of the population were below the poverty line, including 4.7% of those under age 18 and 6.4% of those age 65 or over.

According to the 2020 Census, there were 15,881 people living in Antrim Township. The racial makeup of the township was 90.1% White, 3.9% African American, 0.0% Native American, 0.9% Asian, 1.5% from other races, and 3.6% from two or more races. Hispanic or Latino people of any race were 1.7% of the population.

The marital status of the population 15 years of age and older was 23.2% never married, 23.2% married, 7.9% divorced or separated, and 5.1% widowed.

The educational attainment status of the population 25 years of age and older was 8.7% less than a high school diploma, 42.4% high school graduate or equivalent, 25.0% some college or associate's degree, 15.1% bachelor's degree, and 8.7% graduate or professional degree.

The annual income status of individuals aged 15 years and older was 10.0% earning $1 to $9,999 or loss; 6.9% earning $10,000 to $14,999; 10.8% earning $15,000 to $24,999; 7.0% earning $25,000 to $34,999; 15.5% earning $35,000 to $49,000; 10.6% earning $50,000 to $64,999; 10.5% earning $65,000 to $74,999; and 20.7% earning $75,000 or more.

5.5% of the population lived below the poverty level.

=== Neighboring Townships ===
- Guilford Township (north)
- Hamilton Township (north)
- Montgomery Township (west)
- Peters Township (northwest)
- Quincy Township (east)
- St. Thomas Township (north)
- Washington Township (east)

== Communities ==
- Big Spring
- Brown Mills
- Bushtown
- Clay Hill
- Coseytown
- Johnston
- Kauffman
- Mason and Dixon
- Milnor
- Shady Grove
- State Line
- Waynecastle
- Wingerton
- Worleytown
- Zentmeyer
