= Waynecastle, Pennsylvania =

Agricultural community

Coordinates: 39.7718°N 77.6504°W

Waynecastle is an agricultural community between Waynesboro and Greencastle in Antrim Township, Franklin County, Pennsylvania. It is home to a historic grain elevator alongside the Western Maryland Railroad tracks.

The area also has a small railroad trestle that runs over PA 16. The railroad tracks are still used by CSX. Trains go by several times a day.

== History ==
Franklin Miller opened the grain elevator at Waynecastle in 1900. In 1915, the warehouse was hit by a tornado. The building was completely destroyed by fire in 1922, but by the following year, it had been completely rebuilt using brick. His son, Charles F. Miller, took over the business which operated until 1978.

Since the 1990s, the Waynesboro Model Railroad Club has operated in the Charles F. Miller Grain & Feed Elevator Building at Waynecastle.
