= Mitchell-Shook House =

Historic house in Pennsylvania, United States

- U.S. National Register of Historic Places
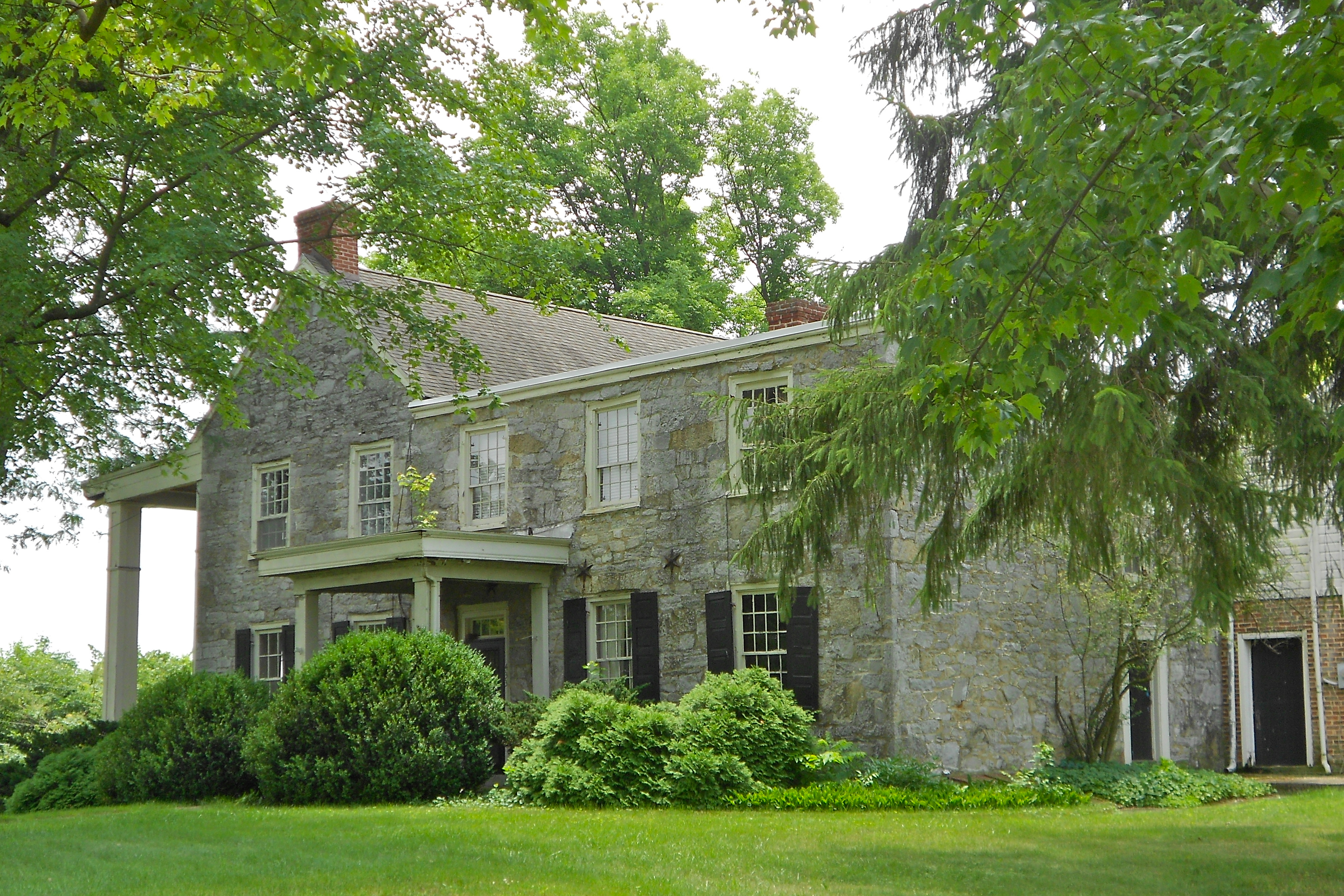

- Location within Pennsylvania Location within the United States
- Location: Leitersburg St., Greencastle, Pennsylvania
- Coordinates: 39°46′48″N 77°43′26″W
- Area: 2.4 acres (0.97 ha)
- Built: c. 1800-1810
- Built by: James Mitchell
- Architectural style: Federal, Federal vernacular
- NRHP reference No.: 80003497
- Added to NRHP: September 17, 1980

Mitchell-Shook House is a historic home located at Greencastle in Franklin County, Pennsylvania. It was built between about 1800 and 1810, and is a two-story, L-shaped limestone building. The house is in a vernacular Federal style. It is five bay wide and has a two-story, flat roofed front porch dated to the 1940s.

It was listed on the National Register of Historic Places in 1980.
