= Old Brown's Mill School =

- U.S. National Register of Historic Places
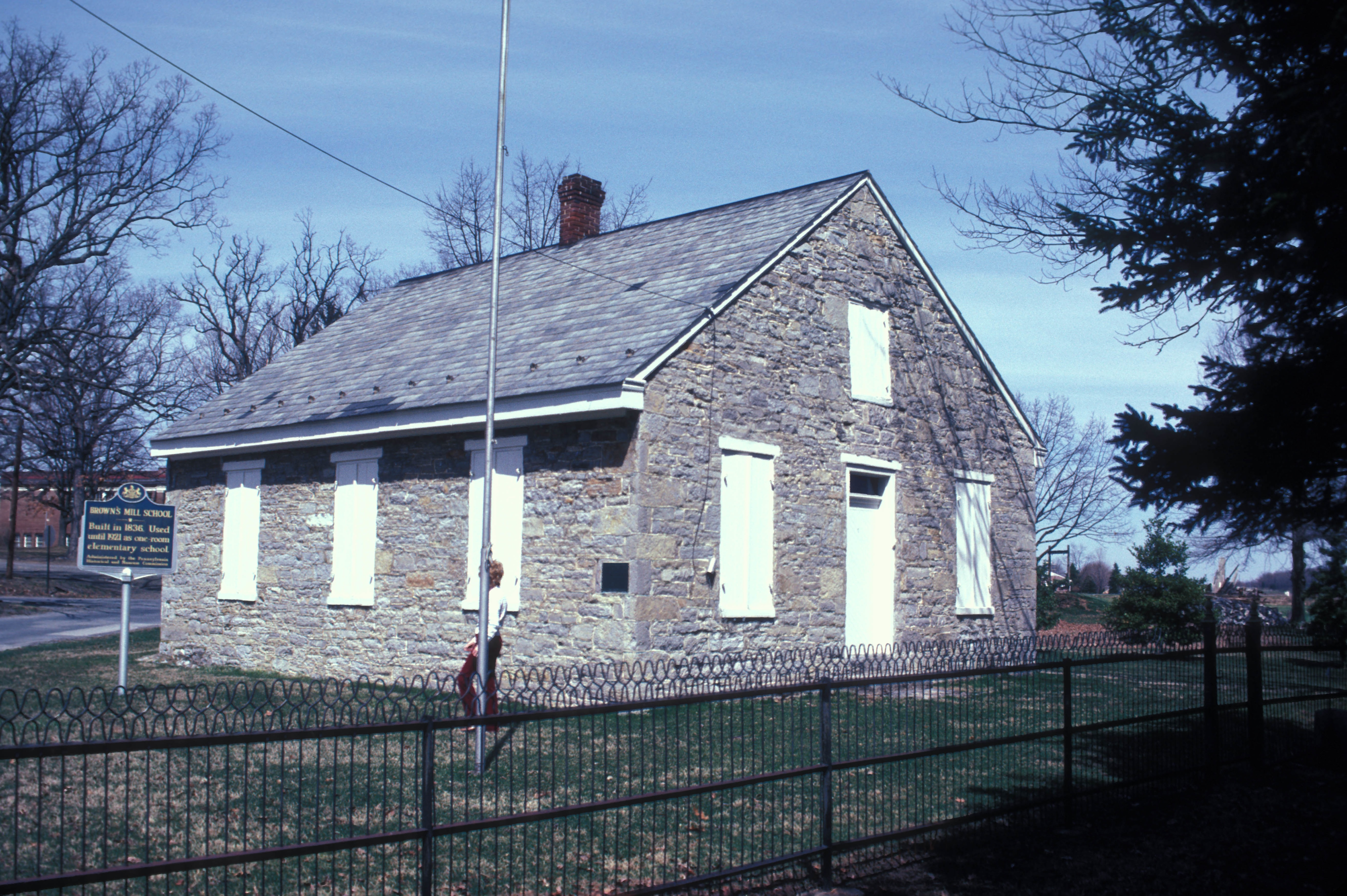

- Location within Pennsylvania Location within the United States
- Location: Off U.S. Route 11 near Kauffman, Antrim Township, Pennsylvania
- Coordinates: 39°49′51″N 77°42′08″W
- Area: 2 acres (0.81 ha)
- Built: 1836
- NRHP reference No.: 73001632
- Added to NRHP: March 7, 1973

The Old Brown's Mill School is an historic, one-room school in Antrim Township in Franklin County, Pennsylvania, United States.

It was listed on the National Register of Historic Places in 1973.

== History and architectural features ==
Built in 1836, this historic structure is a 1 1/2-story, limestone building with an A-shaped shingle roof. Home to a school until 1921, this historic structure was restored in 1934, and, in 1962, was acquired by the Pennsylvania Historical and Museum Commission.

The school is now owned by the Franklin County Historical Society and open to the public in the summer.

== Gallery ==
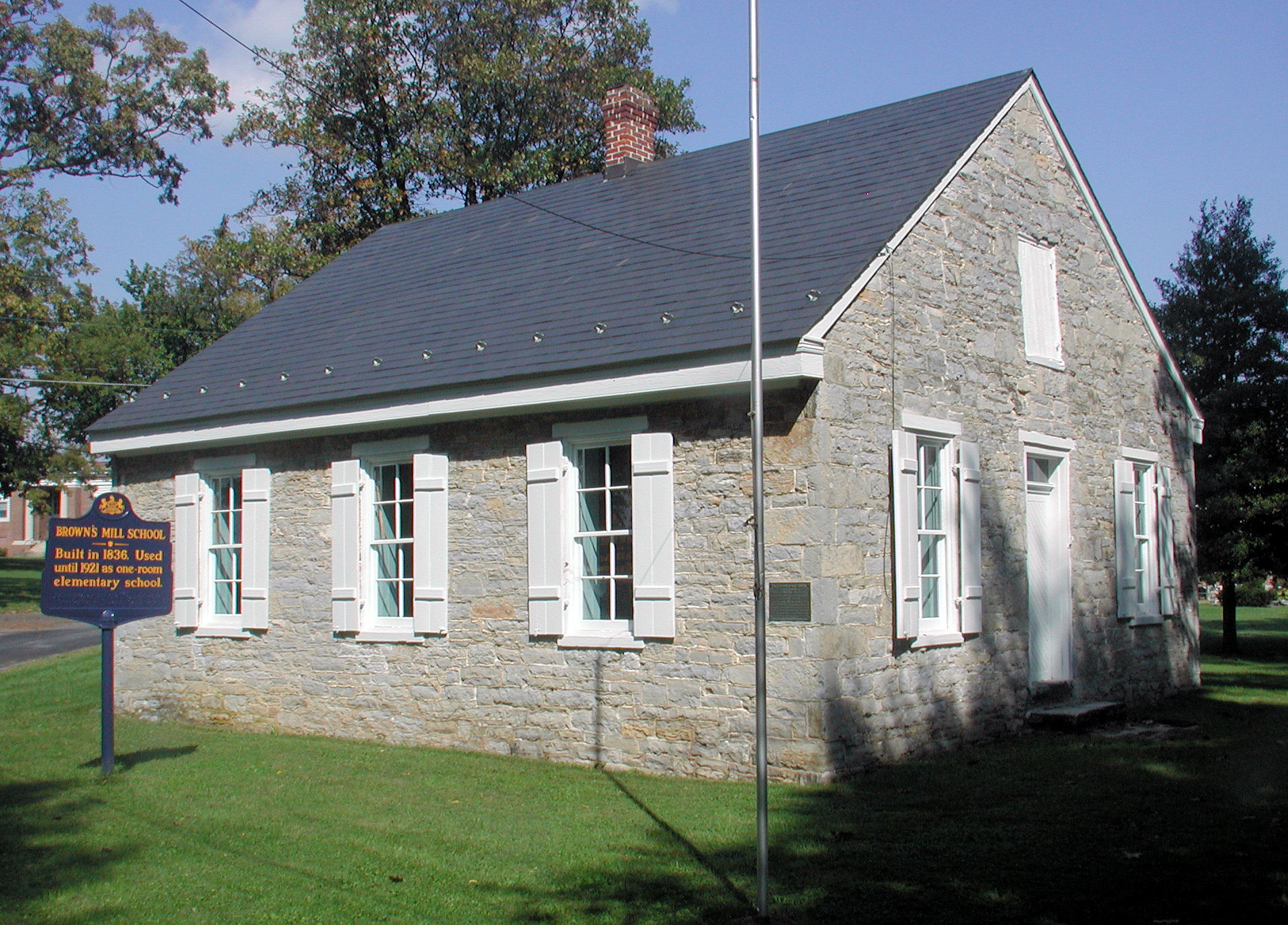

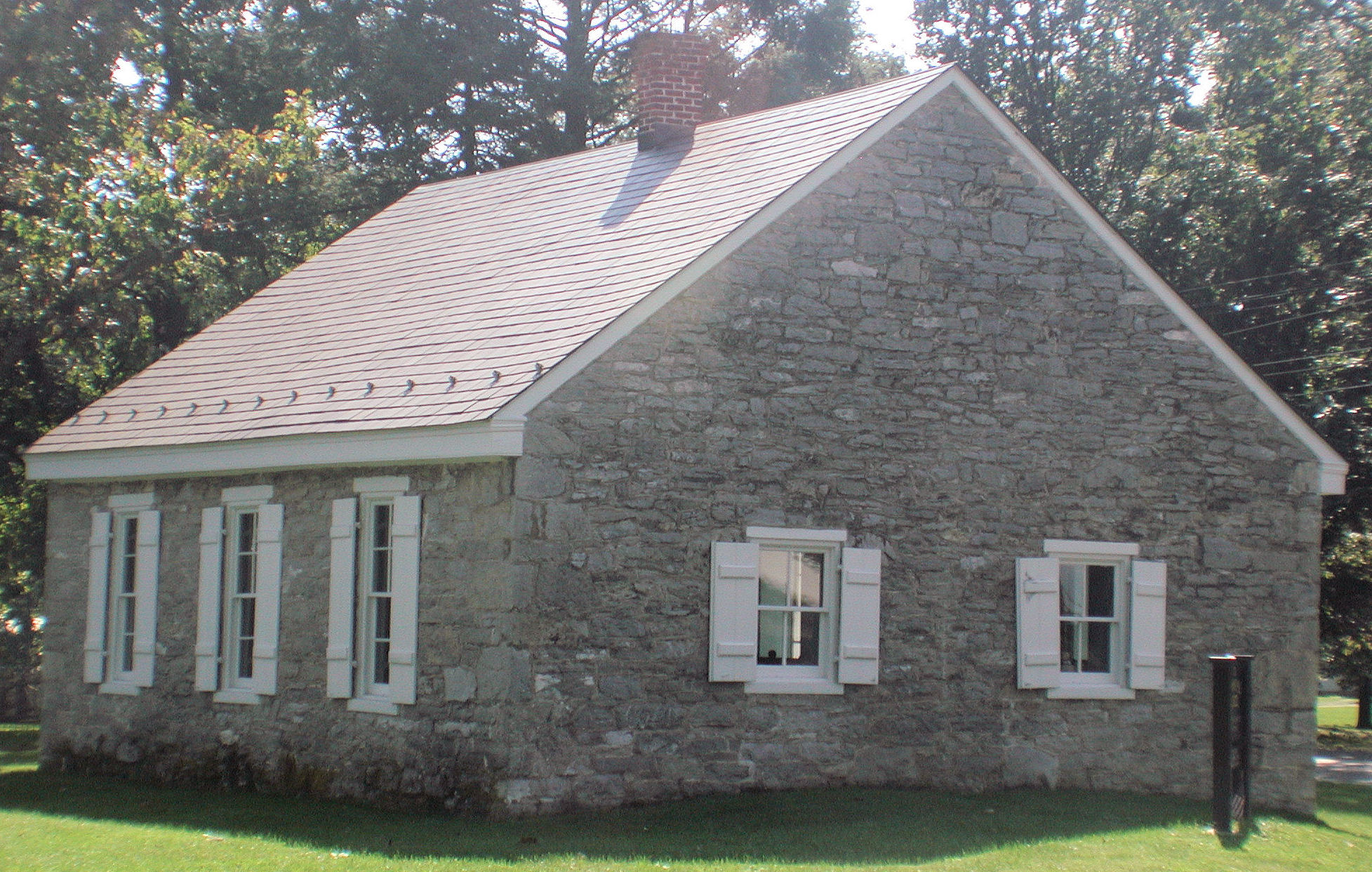

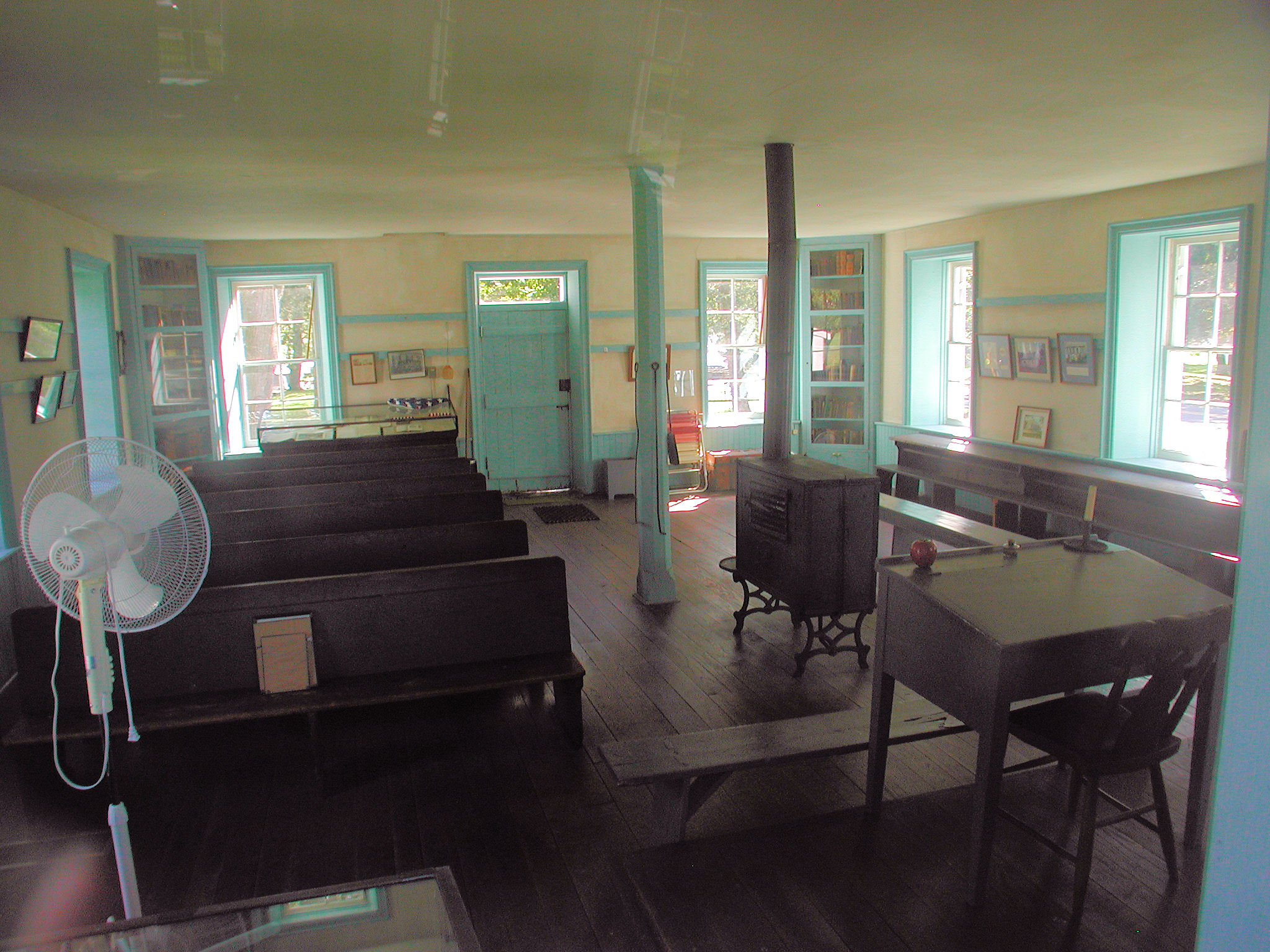
