= Greencastle Historic District =

Historic district in Pennsylvania, United States

- U.S. National Register of Historic Places
- U.S. Historic district
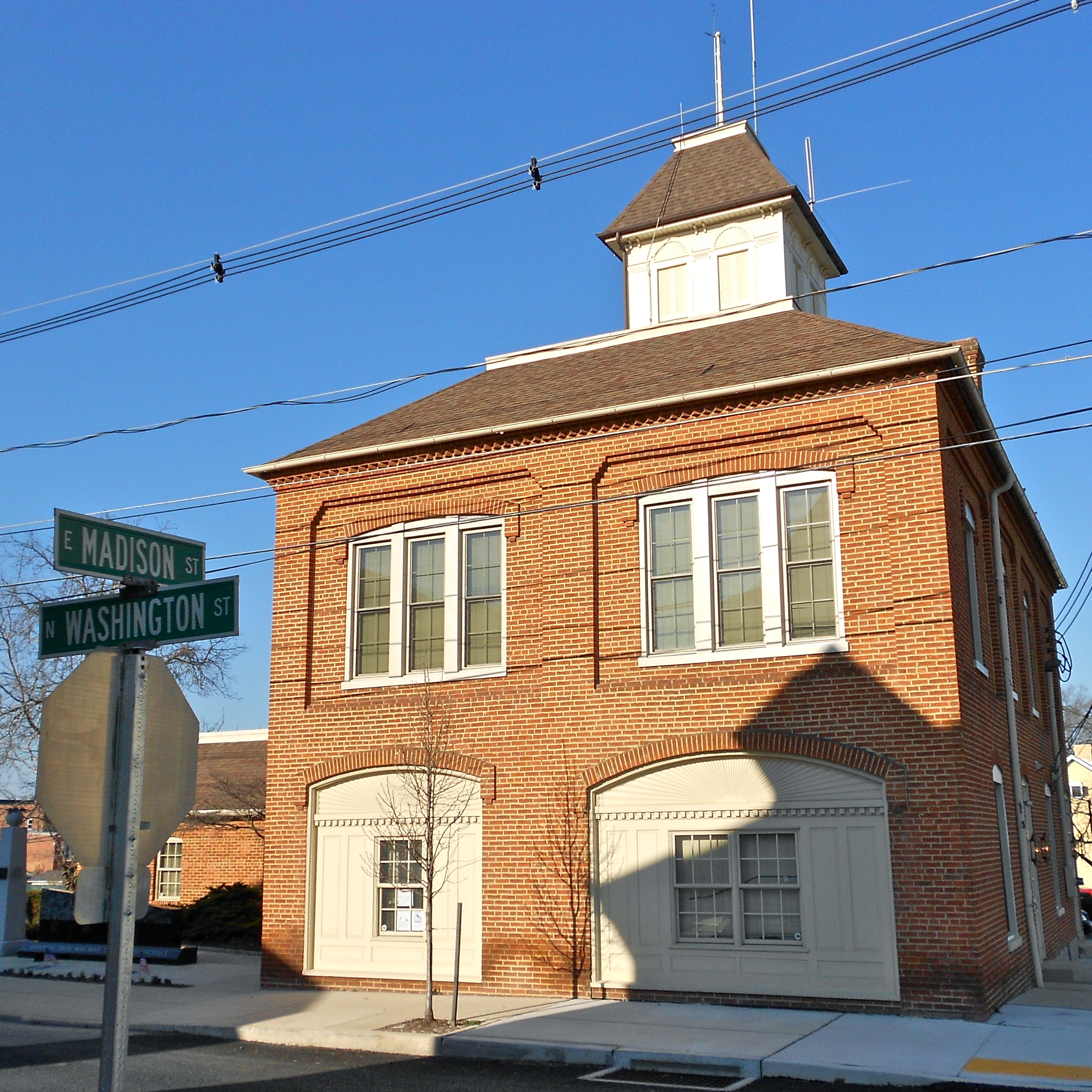
- Police Department

- Location within Pennsylvania Location within the United States
- Location: Roughly bounded by Washington, PA 2002, Jefferson, Mifflin, Chambers, Grant and Allison, and Baltimore N to Spring Grove, Greencastle, Pennsylvania
- Coordinates: 39°47′20″N 77°43′30″W
- Area: 100 acres (40 ha)
- Architectural style: Classical Revival, Second Empire, Federal
- NRHP reference No.: 92001722
- Added to NRHP: December 24, 1992

The Greencastle Historic District is a national historic district which is located in Greencastle in Franklin County, Pennsylvania.

It was listed on the National Register of Historic Places in 1992.

== History and architectural features ==
This historic district includes three hundred and forty-six contributing buildings and two contributing sites, which are located in the central business district and immediate surrounding residential area of Greencastle. These structures date from the late eighteenth to early twentieth centuries.

This district has a number of important examples of Federal, Classical Revival and Second Empire style architecture. Notable buildings include the First National Bank, which was erected in 1874, the Brendle Building, which was built in 1914, the Antrim House, which was erected in 1904, the Hostetter Building, which was built sometime around 1910, the High Line Train Station, which was erected sometime around 1909, and the L.R. Walck Hatchery, which was built in 1908. The two contributing sites are the German Reformed cemetery and Lutheran cemetery.
