= Johnston, Pennsylvania =

Unincorporated community in Pennsylvania, US

- Unincorporated community
- Location within Pennsylvania Location within the United States
- Coordinates: 39°45′30″N 77°45′18″W
- Country: United States
- State: Pennsylvania
- County: Franklin
- Township: Antrim
- Elevation: 535 ft (163 m)
- Time zone: UTC-5 (Eastern (EST))
  - Summer (DST): UTC-4 (EDT)
- Area code: 717
- GNIS feature ID: 1178127

Johnston is an unincorporated community in Franklin County, Pennsylvania, United States. It is located in Antrim Township.
