= Mary Alice Frush =

American Civil War nurse

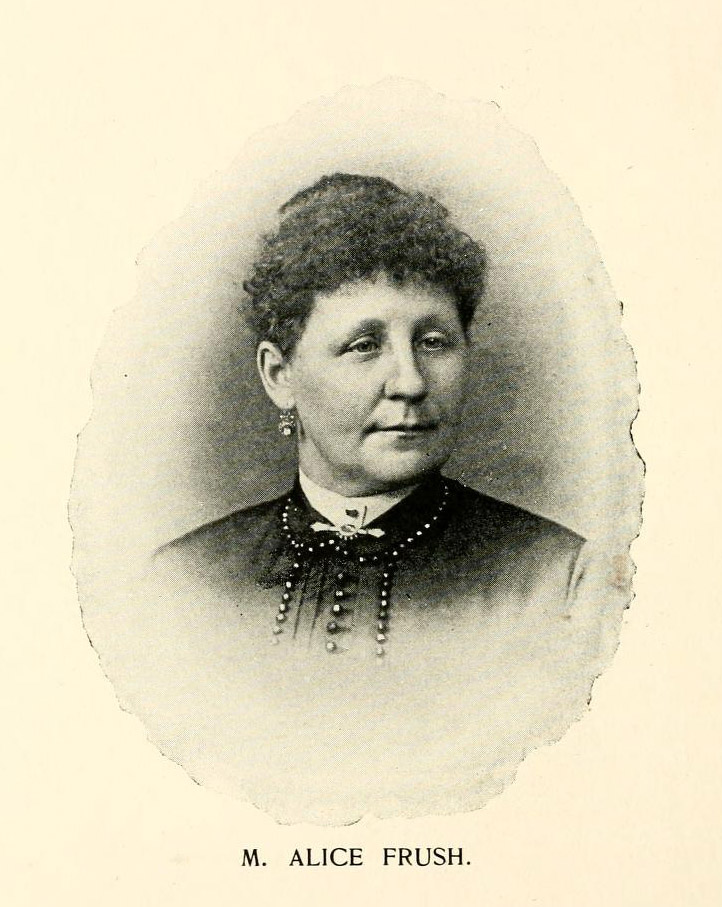
- Born: August 7, 1844
- Died: December 24, 1901 (aged 57)
- Occupation: Nurse

Alice Frush (also known as Mary Alice Frush or Mary Alice Smith) was a Union nurse during the American Civil War.

Frush's hometown, Greencastle, Pennsylvania, was a hotbed of wartime activity. Frush's own father was involved with the Union Army and volunteered their home to be a headquarters for Union officers. In addition, many injured soldiers from nearby battles were carried into the town for medical treatment. Frush herself volunteered when there was a public call for nurses, at eighteen years of age. She began her service at Hagerstown, Maryland and then returned to serve in Greencastle, though her most notable service took place at the battles of Antietam and Gettysburg. During the three years of Frush's service, she worked in hospitals as well as on ambulances, gathering supplies.

Frush's service ended in December 1864, when she left the army to marry Sergeant Frush of the 6th Virginia Cavalry Regiment. She was never officially discharged, so she never received any official discharge papers to prove her service.
