= Ilasco Historic District =

Historic district in Missouri, United States

- U.S. National Register of Historic Places
- U.S. Historic district
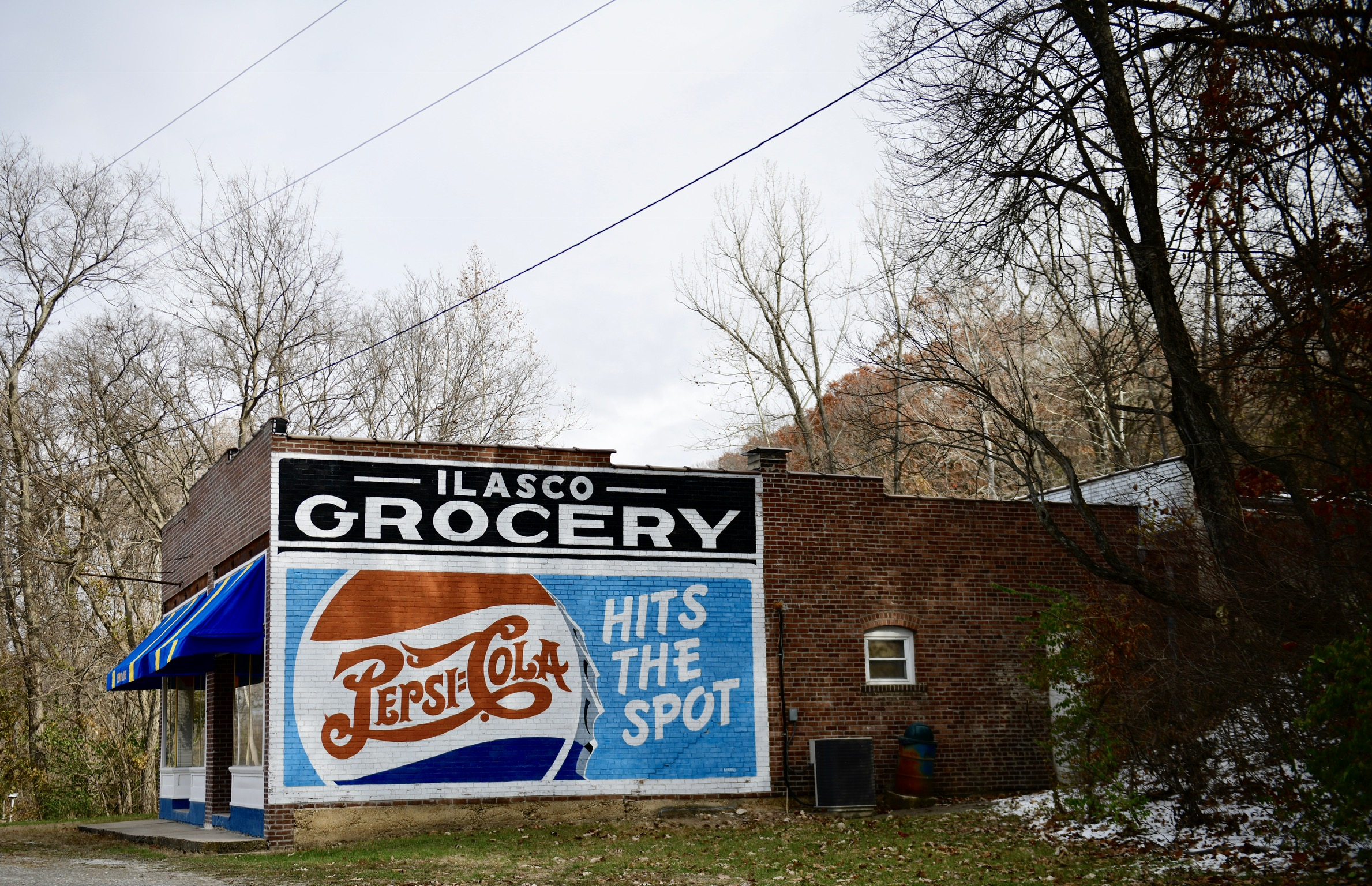

- Location within Missouri Location within the United States
- Location: 10998 Ilasco Trail; Ilasco, Missouri
- Coordinates: 39°40′16″N 91°18′34″W
- Area: Less than 1 acre (0.40 ha)
- Built: 1909-1910
- Built by: Pauley Jail Building Company; Stupp Brothers Bridge and Iron Company
- NRHP reference No.: 16000343
- Added to NRHP: June 7, 2016

Ilasco Historic District is a national historic district located at Ilasco, Ralls County, Missouri. The district encompasses two contributing buildings and one contributing structure in the unincorporated community of Ilasco. It developed about 1909–1910, and includes a jail, a one-story commercial building with two storefronts, and a Pratt pony truss bridge.

It was listed on the National Register of Historic Places in 2016.
