= Mary Alice Peck =

Canadian artist (1855–1943)

- Born: Mary Alice Skelton; December 28, 1855; Montreal, United Province of Canada
- Died: 1943 (aged 87–88)
- Known for: Craftwork, weaving, bookbinding, writing, embroidering, pottery, textiles
- Style: Handicrafts
- Spouse: James Henry Peck

Mary Alice Peck (born Mary Alice Skelton), was a craftwork artist known for her work in founding the Canadian Handicrafts Guild of Montreal.

== Life and education ==
Mary Alice Peck, originally Mary Alice Skelton, was born in Montreal, Quebec, on December 28, 1855, to the Skeltons–an upper-class, well-educated family. She was the eldest daughter of six children, having two older brothers and three younger sisters, with whom she was very close. Her family had a history of artistry and an appreciation for art, with her eldest brother, Leslie, being an artist himself. Thus, Alice Peck grew up admiring art and different forms of craftmanship. Beginning from the age of 14, she travelled around Europe frequently, as she attended boarding school in England and often travelled with her family when they visited her. During one of these trips, Peck travelled to London and visited the Victoria and Albert Museum, which displayed several handicraft artworks. This visit reportedly had greatly influenced Alice Peck’s interest in handicraft work, which she began practicing. Upon returning to Montreal, Alice Peck, then Alice Skelton, married an upper-class businessman, James Henry Peck, in 1878. The pair eventually had seven children who, like Alice Peck during her own childhood, were sent abroad to Britain to attend school. During Peck’s married, adult life, she became very involved with several organizations relating to culture, music, and art. These organizations included the Montreal Ladies' Morning Musical Club, the Women's Branch of the Antiquarian and Numismatic Society, and, in 1894, even became the president of the Women’s Art Association of Montreal. As Alice Peck did not stop creating handicraft works of art throughout her life, nor did she lose appreciation for crafts as works of artistry, she continued this work during her time as president of the Women’s Art Society of Montreal. In fact, Peck eventually advocated for crafts as a form of artwork to the extent that creating handicrafts became the main focus of the Woman’s Art Society of Montreal. In 1903, James Peck died of a sudden illness, leaving Alice Peck to care for their children and the company that James Peck had been in charge of while they were married. She continued to act as the matriarch for her seven children, twelve grandchildren, and five great-grandchildren until her death at the age of 88 in 1943.

== Artistic career ==
Mary Alice Peck’s artistic career spanned the course of her lifetime and took many forms as her own style changed and evolved. As an interdisciplinary artist, Peck produced different kinds of handicraft art including weavings, embroideries, pottery, bookbinding, and textiles. In addition to these various forms of handicraft artwork, Peck worked as a writer, creating both works about her life and the Canadian Handicrafts Guild, as well as “children’s stories, poetry, fictional prose, and essays”. Alice Peck also enjoyed music and throughout her life she was a member of many choirs including the Montreal Ladies Musical Club.

== The Canadian Handicrafts Guild ==
The Canadian Handicrafts Guild was created in 1905 by Mary Alice Peck and May Phillips and was considered to be “Canada’s only national craft organization”. The purpose of the guild was to maintain and preserve traditional methods of craftmanship–an issue about which Alice Peck felt quite strongly. These methods were perceived as being threatened by extinction and, therefore, the Handicrafts Guild sought to halt this loss of tradition. The Guild itself was formed with a resemblance to traditional conceptions of guilds and communities, though in order to provide funding for their project, members would generate profit through the sale of crafts produced by both Canadian settlers and Indigenous peoples. While the Handicrafts Guild’s products were at first looked down upon and did not generate a large income, eventually these products became more widespread and popular, resulting in an increased profit margin for the Guild and its members.Eventually, the Handicrafts Guild faced dissolution as a result of dissonance between its members. Older generations of crafts artists argued in support of maintaining the traditions of Canadian handicrafts and resisted the evolution or modernization of handicraft art. Younger generations, though, opposed this resistance and advocated for the Handicrafts Guild to change with the times, relinquishing traditional handicraft methods and styles in favour of modernity. Additionally, with the popularization of handicrafts within larger society, several organizations and distributors began dealing in handicraft goods, thus creating competition for the Guild in terms of pricing and quality of artistry. This competition and decline of the Canadian Handicrafts Guild eventually resulted in its dissolution in 1974.

=== Achievements of the Canadian Handicrafts Guild ===
The legacy of Alice Peck's Guild is easily recognized through the proliferation of craftwork as a form of art. Prior to Peck and the Handicrafts Guild’s advocation of crafts as artwork, society often devalued crafts as unprofessional or immature, nothing near resembling true art. The Guild’s promotion of skilled handicrafts, though, allowed for an alteration of societal limitations concerning what is considered art and succeeded in bringing crafts work into the larger art world. The Handicrafts Guild imposed standards of work, thus separating artistic craftwork from underdeveloped projects. Because of these standards, “[the Canadian Handicrafts Guild] developed an audience for craft as professional, artistic enterprise”. Modern understandings and standards for crafts can be attributed to these early achievements of organizations like the Handicrafts Guild within both public opinion and the art market. Alice Peck’s social standing and influence within Montreal high society was also important in the evolution of public and artistic opinion. Peck’s positing of individual craft artists as experts was an important step in judging which crafts could be considered high quality art, thus the “resulting perception of craft as a professional enterprise replete with experts has dramatically increased market demand for all types of professional craft production”.

The Canadian Handicrafts Guild has also been attributed with the proliferation of craftwork within economically disenfranchised communities, which provided a means of income. This work reflected Alice Peck’s philanthropist tendencies and practices, as she spent much of her life working to help others through craftwork. The Guild worked to teach women outside of urban spaces how to make handicraft artwork in order to have a form of income with which they could support themselves while maintaining artistic integrity and individuality. This program, though, was eventually taken over by the Canadian government, who could produce and educate about craftwork on a much larger scale–at the cost of individuality and originality. This did not stop Peck, though, as she continued her altruistic practices and taught about crafts and artmaking until her death in 1943.

=== Legacy of the guild ===
Although discontinued, remnants of Alice Peck’s Handicrafts Guild can still be seen today through the Canadian Handicrafts Guild’s permanent collection, located in Quebec. Alice Peck created funding for the permanent collection, which served as a kind of educational museum displaying important historical and contemporary examples of handicraft artwork. This permanent collection still exists today, though much of it has been altered or moved into museums around the world. The preservation of these craftwork examples allows for the continuation of handicraft artwork, as craftwork traditions, methods, and styles have been maintained through the Canadian Handicrafts Guild’s permanent collection.

== Philanthropy ==
Throughout her life, Alice Peck engaged in a number of philanthropic undertakings. During her travels to London and her discovery of handicrafts, she was greatly inspired by the ways in which craft-making could have a positive impact on one’s life. Peck was specifically inspired by how craft-making brought joy into the life of one disabled woman. This inspiration led Alice Peck to continue encouraging disenfranchised individuals to partake in making crafts as a form of therapy. One such instance occurred during WW1, when she and her daughter travelled to England to volunteer in a military hospital. While caring for wounded soldiers she taught them how to create handicrafts as a form a therapy. Specifically, Peck would teach soldiers how to therapeutically weave materials using a reed loom. Peck found this work so rewarding that she continued to teach handicrafts as therapy to soldiers upon her return to Canada and was the director of this form of therapy within Montreal military hospitals. Programs called the Soldier’s Fund and Undermount Industries were also implemented in order to provide support for disabled veterans. These programs were undertaken within Alice Peck’s own home, called “undermount”, and involved soldiers being taught handicraft skills including book binding, weaving, and basket making. In addition to acting as a form of therapy, learning how to create handicraft artwork provided disabled individuals with an alternative form of income, as they could not work within traditionally acceptable job markets.

== Sources ==
- Alfody, Sandra. Crafting Identity: The Development of Professional Fine Craft in Canada. Montreal: McGill-Queen’s University Press, 2005.https://www.mqup.ca/crafting-identity-products-9780773528604.php
- Concordia University. “Canadian Women Artists History Initiative: Artist Database: Peck, Alice.” Last modified July 24, 2013. https://cwahi.concordia.ca/sources/artists/displayArtist.php?ID_artist=5566
- McLean, Lorna, Kate O’Rourke, and Sharon Cook. Framing Our Past: Constructing Canadian Women’s History in the Twentieth Century. Montreal: McGill-Queen’s University Press, 2001. https://www.mqup.ca/framing-our-past-products-9780773531598.php
- McLeod, Ellen Mary Easton. In Good Hands: The Women of the Canadian Handicrafts Guild. Montreal: McGill-Queen’s University Press, 1999. https://www.mqup.ca/in-good-hands-products-9780886293567.php
- Mission Gallery. “Women’s Art Society of Montreal: WASM Celebrates 125 Years!” Last modified 2019. Accessed January 28, 2022. https://www.womensartsociety.com/history
- Peck, Alice. “Handicrafts from Coast to coast”. Canadian Geographical Journal (1934): 1-16. https://dspace.gipe.ac.in/xmlui/bitstream/handle/10973/18546/GIPE-045106.pdf?sequence=3
