= Harvey L. Johnson =

Harvey L. Johnson (Cleburne, Texas, September 12, 1904 - May 29, 1995), was an American scholar of Latin America, professor and radio broadcaster. The Southwest Council of Latin American Studies' Harvey L. Johnson Award is named after him.

== Broadcasting ==
- Hello Neighbor 22 program cultural program
