= Mary Alice Coffroth =

American marine biologist

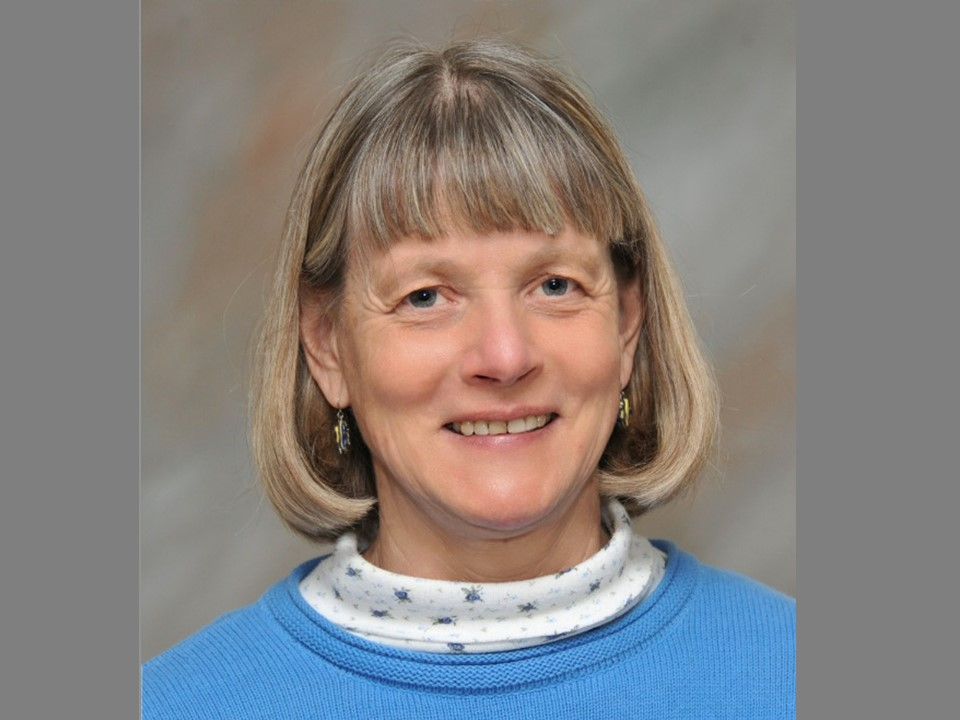
- Born: 1954 (age 71–72); Somerset, PA
- Education: College of William and Mary; University of Miami
- Scientific career
- Fields: Marine Biology
- Workplaces: State University of New York at Buffalo
- Thesis: Mucous sheet production by poritid corals (1988)

Mary Alice Coffroth is an American marine biologist and professor at the State University of New York at Buffalo. She is known for using molecular tools to examine coral larval ecology, recruitment and cnidarian-dinoflagellate symbiosis.

== Education and career ==
Coffroth has a B.S. from the College of William and Mary (1976), and an M.S. (1981) and a Ph.D. (1988) from the University of Miami. In 1990, she joined the State University of New York at Buffalo where, as, of 2023, she is a professor in the department of Geology.

== Research ==
Her PhD research focused on the production of coral mucus by poritid corals and its role in the reef ecosystem. She was an early adopter of molecular approaches in marine ecology, initially examining gorgonian population genetics using DNA fingerprinting, followed by research into the molecular taxonomy of cnidarian photosymbionts. Coffroth has used the underwater research station Aquarius Reef Base to study genetic differences in corals. Her work on coral spawning in the Caribbean has shown that corals can initially take up a range of symbiont species, which are then winnowed to a predictable subset. She has also examined how coral symbionts are responding to climate change and increasing sea water temperatures. She established a culture collection with Caribbean corals and octocorals, the BURR Culture Collection, which is used to examine the relationship between corals and their symbiotic algae.

== Selected publications ==
- Coffroth, Mary Alice; Santos, Scott R. (2005-06-17). "Genetic Diversity of Symbiotic Dinoflagellates in the Genus Symbiodinium". Protist. 156 (1): 19–34. doi:10.1016/j.protis.2005.02.004. ISSN 1434-4610. PMID 16048130.
- Shoguchi, Eiichi; Shinzato, Chuya; Kawashima, Takeshi; Gyoja, Fuki; Mungpakdee, Sutada; Koyanagi, Ryo; Takeuchi, Takeshi; Hisata, Kanako; Tanaka, Makiko; Fujiwara, Mayuki; Hamada, Mayuko; Seidi, Azadeh; Fujie, Manabu; Usami, Takeshi; Goto, Hiroki (2013-08-05). "Draft Assembly of the Symbiodinium minutum Nuclear Genome Reveals Dinoflagellate Gene Structure". Current Biology. 23 (15): 1399–1408. Bibcode:2013CBio...23.1399S. doi:10.1016/j.cub.2013.05.062. ISSN 0960-9822. PMID 23850284. S2CID 7769853.
- Desalvo, M. K.; Voolstra, C. R.; Sunagawa, S.; Schwarz, J. A.; Stillman, J. H.; Coffroth, M. A.; Szmant, A. M.; Medina, M. (2008). "Differential gene expression during thermal stress and bleaching in the Caribbean coral Montastraea faveolata". Molecular Ecology. 17 (17): 3952–3971. Bibcode:2008MolEc..17.3952D. doi:10.1111/j.1365-294X.2008.03879.x. PMID 18662230. S2CID 2082603.
- Botsford, L. W.; White, J. W.; Coffroth, M.- A.; Paris, C. B.; Planes, S.; Shearer, T. L.; Thorrold, S. R.; Jones, G. P. (2009). "Connectivity and resilience of coral reef metapopulations in marine protected areas: matching empirical efforts to predictive needs". Coral Reefs. 28 (2): 327–337. Bibcode:2009CorRe..28..327B. doi:10.1007/s00338-009-0466-z. ISSN 0722-4028. PMC 3402229. PMID 22833699.
- Kinzie, Robert A.; Takayama, Michelle; Santos, Scott R.; Coffroth, Mary Alice (2001). "The Adaptive Bleaching Hypothesis: Experimental Tests of Critical Assumptions". The Biological Bulletin. 200 (1): 51–58. doi:10.2307/1543084. ISSN 0006-3185. JSTOR 1543084. PMID 11249211. S2CID 4004814.
