= Stover–Winger Farm =

- U.S. National Register of Historic Places
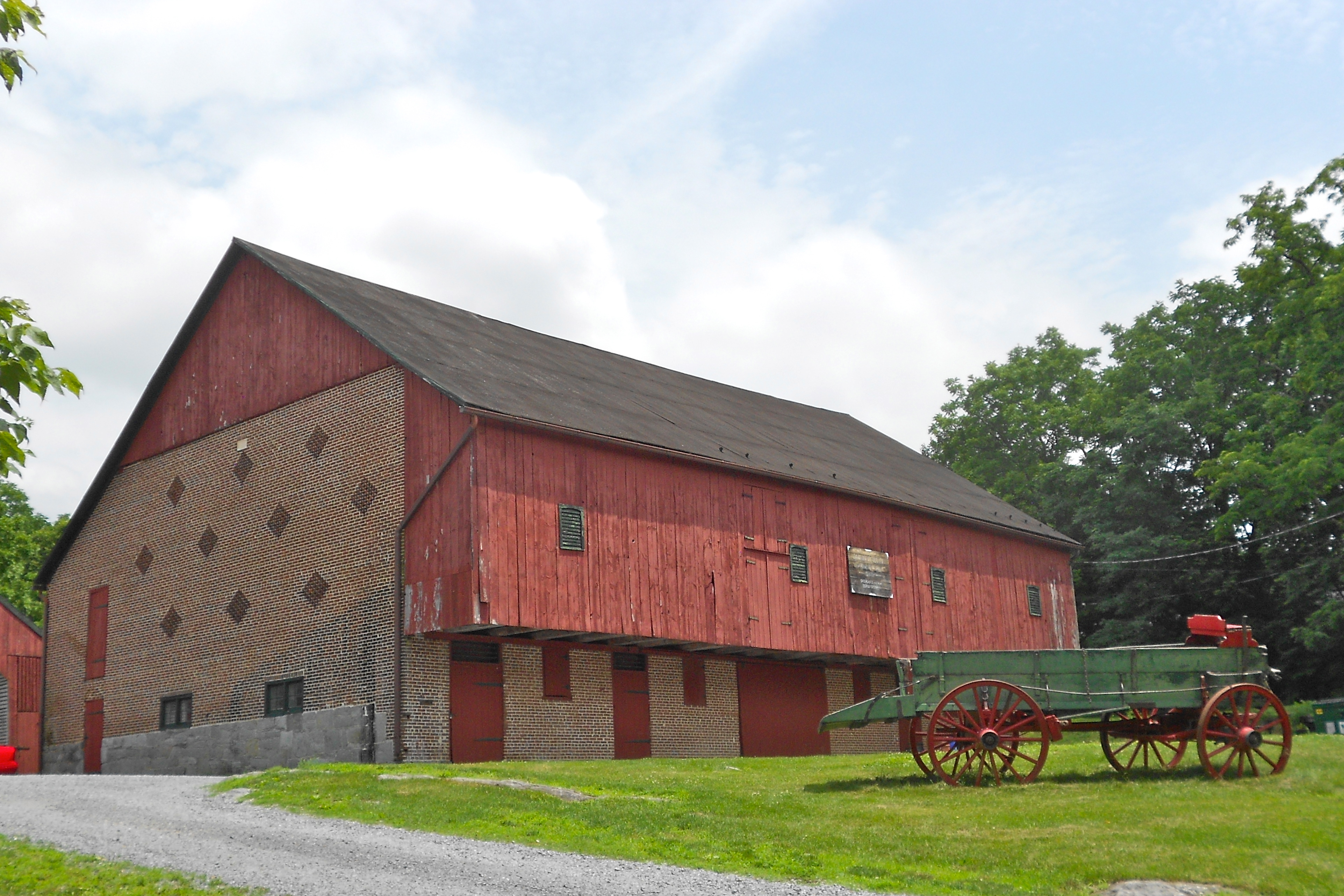

- Location within Pennsylvania Location within the United States
- Location: Leitersburg Road near Greencastle, Antrim Township, Pennsylvania
- Coordinates: 39°46′44″N 77°43′12″W
- Area: 3 acres (1.2 ha)
- Built: 1849, 1876
- Architect: Stover, J.P.
- NRHP reference No.: 79002230
- Added to NRHP: August 24, 1979

The Stover–Winger Farm, also known as Tayamentasachta, is an historic farm complex that is located in Antrim Township in Franklin County, Pennsylvania, United States.

It was listed on the National Register of Historic Places in 1979.

== History and architectural features ==
The house was built in the 1840s or 1850s, and is a two-story, four-bay, T-shaped, brick dwelling. It has a two-story, three-bay, brick-cased, log wing and a one-story, shed-roofed porch that wraps around three sides of the building.

Also located on the property are a contributing brick beehive oven, a brick end bank barn that was built in 1849 and rebuilt in 1876 after a fire, a frame wagon shed, and a metal "Stover Wind Engine".

The farm was purchased by the Greencastle-Antrim School District in 1966. The property includes the spring named Tayamentasachta, a favorite camp site for the Delaware Indians.

== Gallery ==
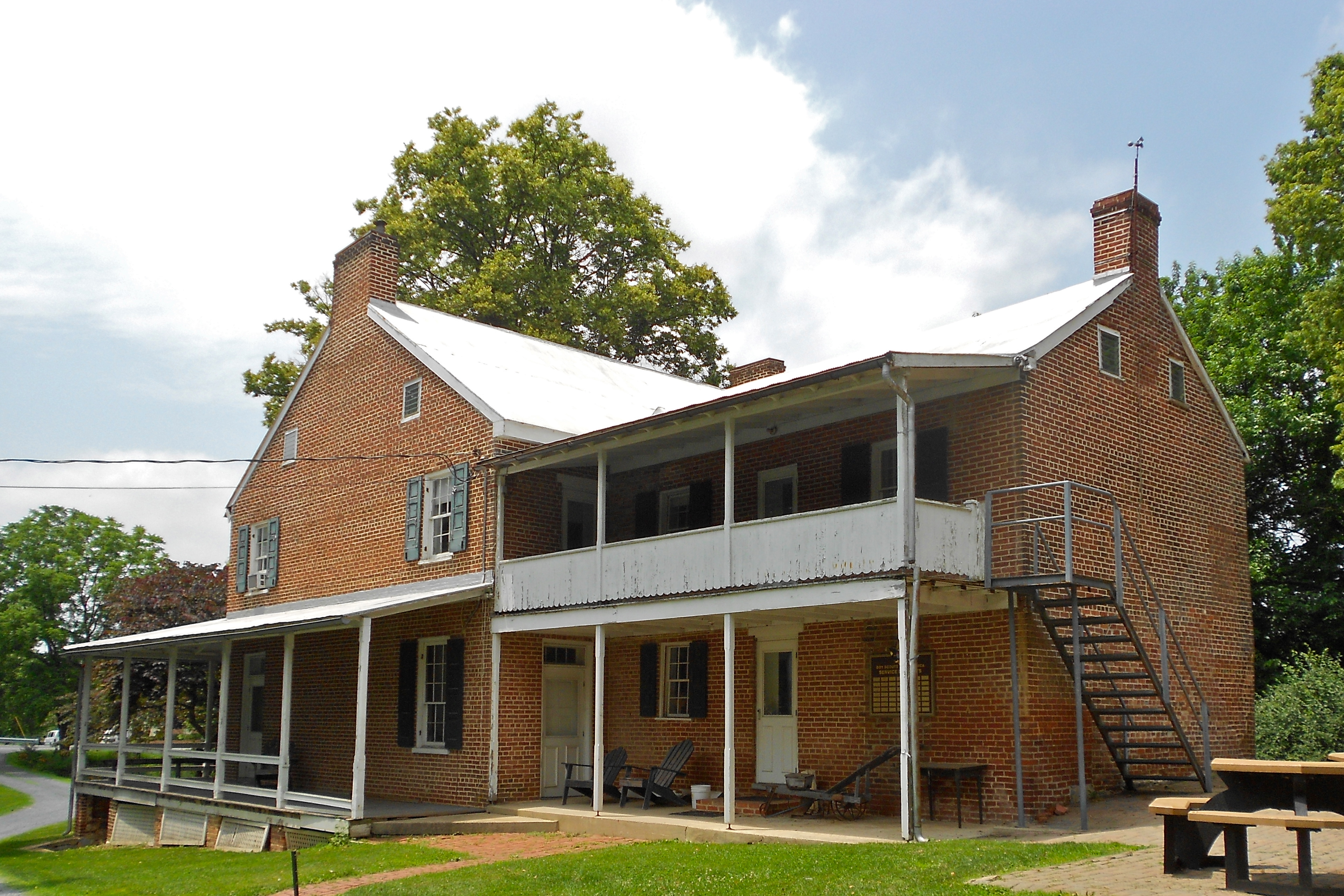
Farm house

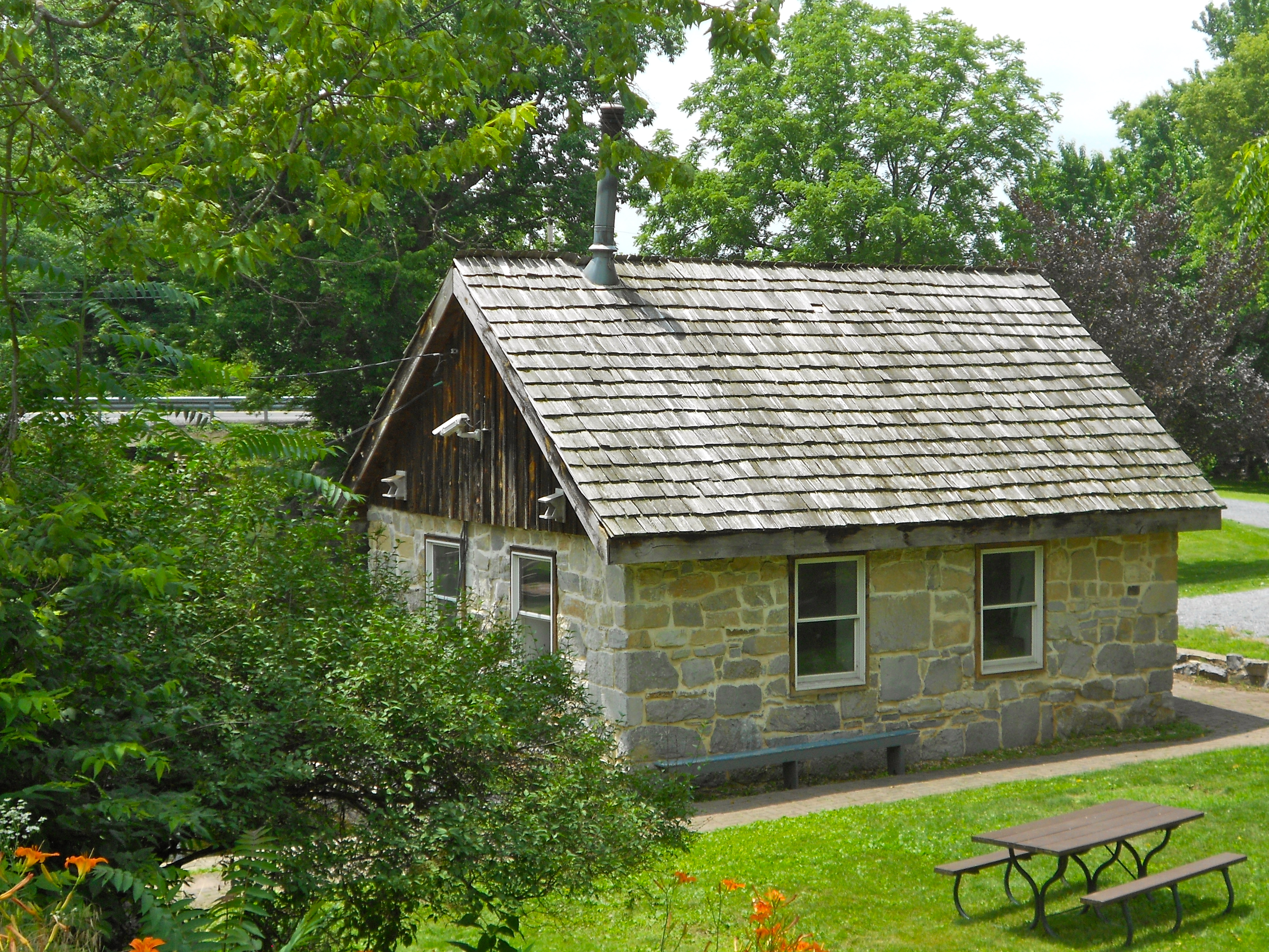
Spring house

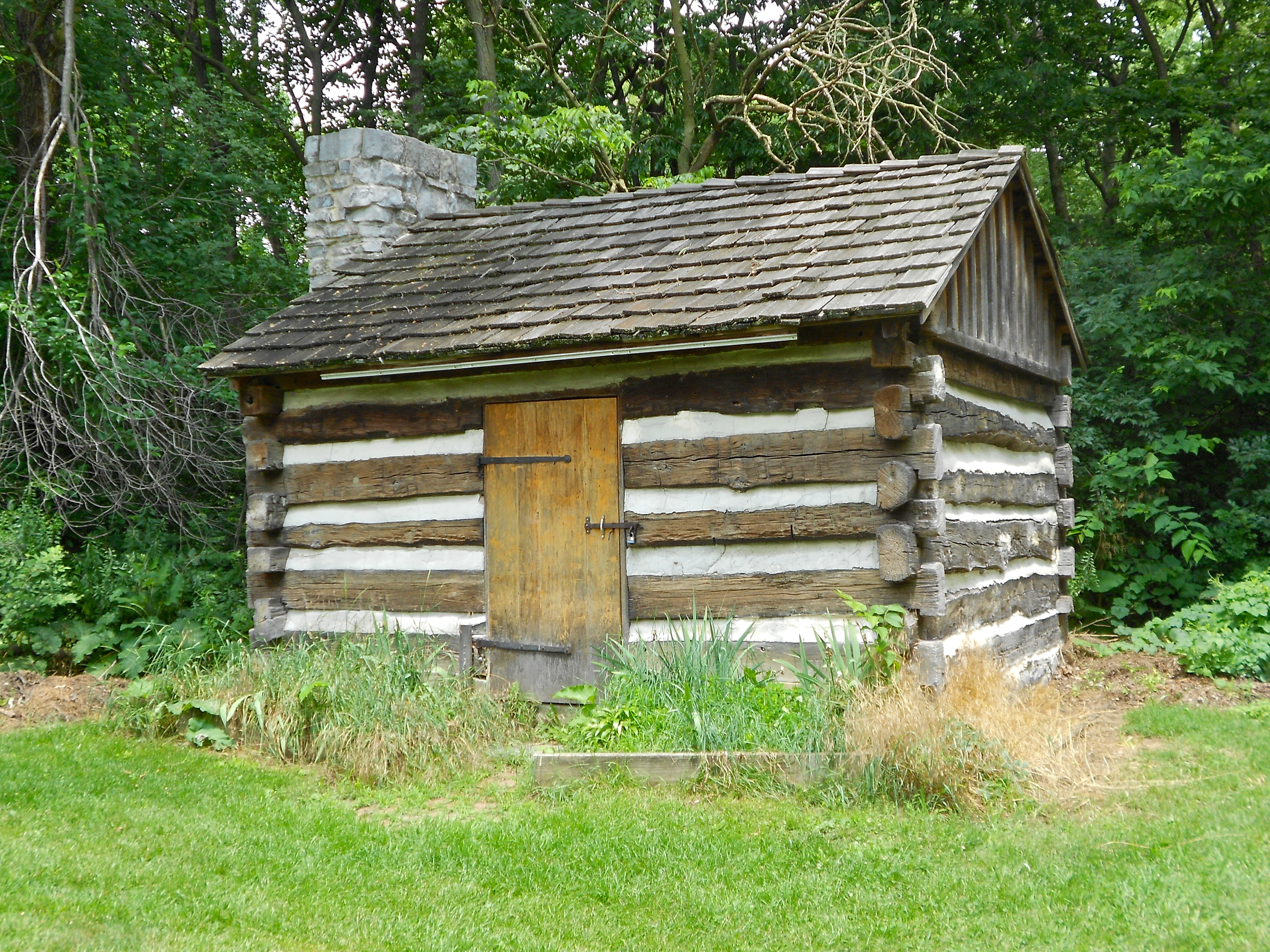
Log cabin

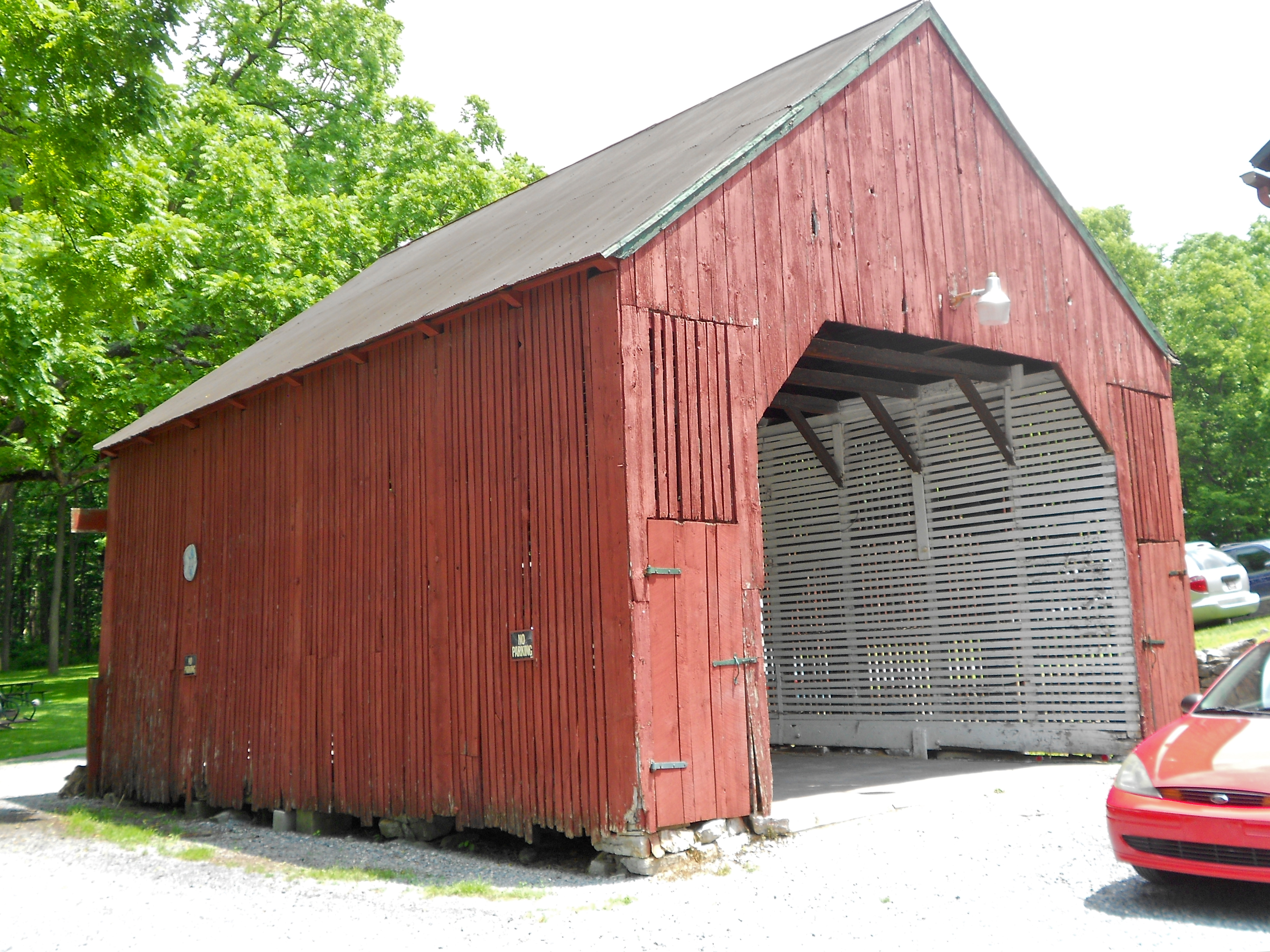
Corn crib
