= Mary Alice Lair =

American politician

52nd Chairwoman of the Kansas Republican Party
- In office June 1982 – August 1982
- Preceded by: Morris Kay
- Succeeded by: Robert Frederick Bennett

Personal details
- Born: October 20, 1936 (age 89)
- Party: Republican
- Spouse: Virgil A Lair
- Children: Greg Lair, Mark Lair, Casey Lair, Jill Lair Aylward

Mary Alice Lair is an American politician from Kansas. In 1982 she served as the first chairwoman of the Kansas Republican Party, and was a long time Republican national committeewoman, representing southeastern Kansas.

== Biography ==
Lair served as the vice-president of the Kansas Republican Party (KSGOP) from starting in 1980. Lair was named the first chairwoman of the KSGOP for three months, from June to August 1982. After this, she again served as vice-president until 1988, when she start to serve as a Republican National Committeewoman until 2000. During this period she was a staunch supporter of both George H. W. Bush and George W. Bush. Lair voted in the 1993 Republican National Committee voicing her support of traditional, "broad", Republicans, instead of caving to pressure from the grassroots religious right, stating that being overtly partisan on the issue of religion would hurt elect-ability. Lair also supported Sam Brownback, and helped work on his 2014 re-election bid, stating that although his tax policies were unpopular at the moment, that they were going to be good for Kansas in the long run.

Lair was one of the earliest, and most vocal supporters of Donald Trump during the 2016 Republican Party presidential primaries, being one of the few Kansas Republican leaders that backed him over the more traditionally Republican Ted Cruz. Lair stated after the 2016 Kansas Republican presidential caucuses that Trump is "a force to be reckoned with who can absolutely beat out Clinton, which needs to be the Republicans’ focus" and that “Trump stands for everything I do". In 2021, Lair endorsed Derek Schmidt in the 2022 Kansas gubernatorial election, saying that the Democratic party were "far-left" and didn't represent the people of Kansas. Lair is also well known in Republican circles for her attendance of every Republican gubernatorial Inaugural ball, often in flashy, patriotic themed, outfits.

In the mid-1970s, Lair was one of the founding members of the Kansas Fairgrounds Foundation, which organize the Kansas State Fair. In 2023 she was recognized for over 50 years in service to the foundation, and her ability to use political connections to lobby for funding for the fair in its early years. The foundation stated that without Lair, it is unlikely that the Kansas State Fair would exist in its present form.

== Personal life ==
The Lair family, including Mary Alice, were named the Kansas State family of the year for 2022, as 21 living members of the family had graduated from the university. The Lair family attended 6 of the 9 colleges, and are one of the original season ticket holders for the Wildcats.

Party political offices
Preceded by Morris Kay	Chairwoman of the Kansas Republican Party; June 1982 – August 1982	Succeeded by Robert Frederick Bennett
