= Mary-Alice Daniel =

Nigerian-American poet

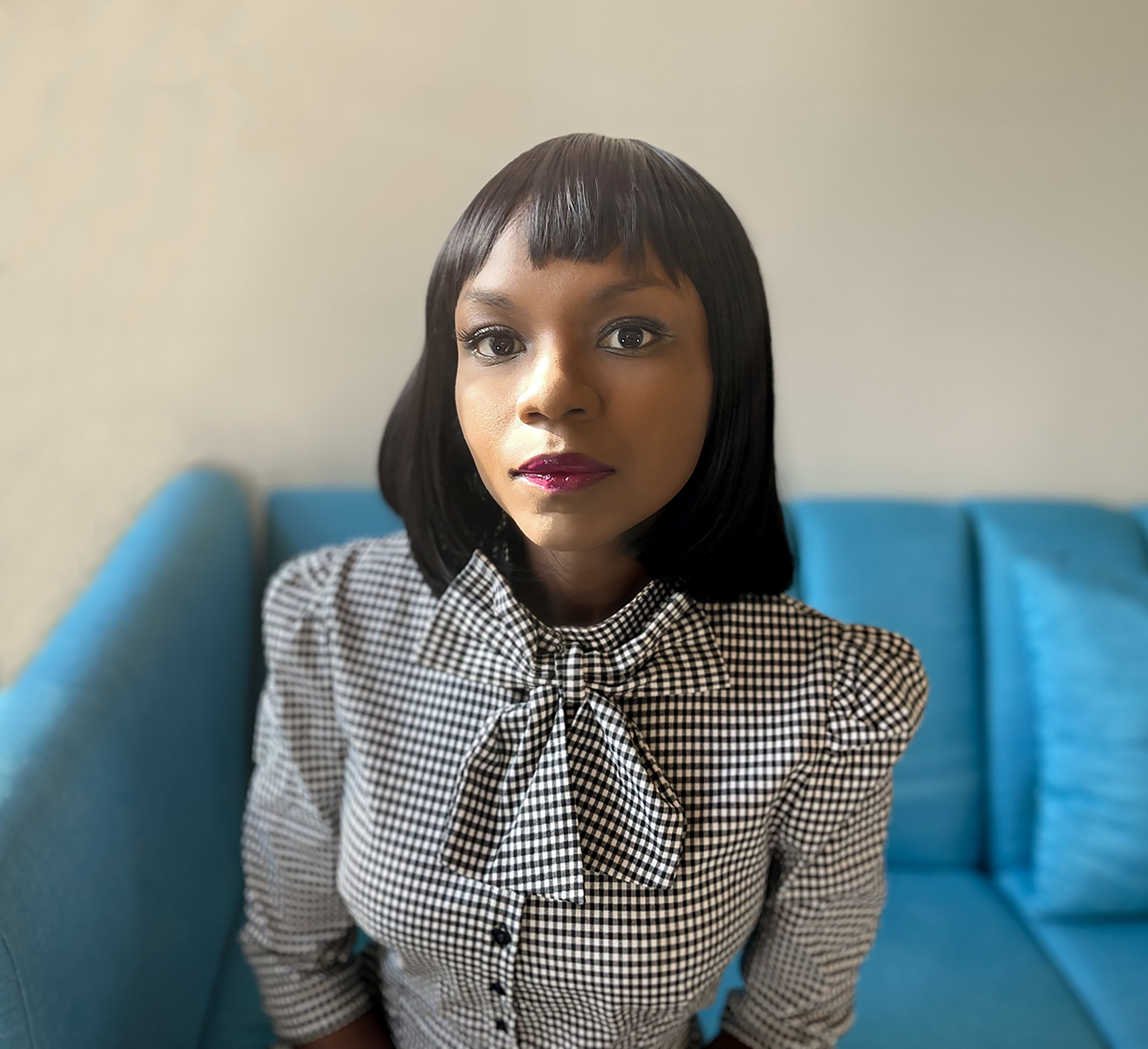
- Born: 1986 (age 39–40); Maiduguri, Nigeria
- Education: Yale University (BA, 2008); University of Michigan (MFA, 2013); University of Southern California (Ph.D., 2021)
- Occupation: Writer
- Writing career
- Notable awards: Yale Series of Younger Poets Prize (2022)

Mary-Alice Daniel (born in 1986 in Maiduguri) is a Nigerian-American writer. She won the Yale Series of Younger Poets Prize in 2022 for her first book of poetry, Mass for Shut-Ins.

== Personal life and education ==
Daniel was born in Maiduguri, Nigeria, in a predominantly Islamic Sharia state in 1986. Daniel identifies as Hausa–Fulani and was raised in a Christian minority tradition. In childhood, she emigrated to Reading, England, and Nashville, Tennessee, but returned intermittently to northern Nigeria.

She received a Bachelor of Arts from Yale University in 2008, a Master of Fine Arts from the Helen Zell Writers’ Program at the University of Michigan in 2013, and a Doctor of Philosophy in English literature and creative writing from the University of Southern California in 2021, after which she began a postdoctoral fellowship at Brown University. In 2023, Daniel became the inaugural Visiting Writer-in-Residence at the Center for the Literary Arts at Washington University in St. Louis. She was appointed as the 2024 Mary Routt Endowed Chair of Writing at Scripps College.

== Literary career ==
In March 2022, Rae Armantrout selected Daniel's Mass for Shut-Ins manuscript as the 117th winner of the Yale Series of Younger Poets Prize. Armantrout commented, “Daniel draws on animistic, Islamic, and syncretic Christian traditions from her native Nigeria to unleash potent incantations, rituals, and spells, electric as St. Elmo's fire. This is Flowers of Evil for the 21st century.” Yale University Press published the Mass for Shut-Ins collection in March 2023. The Poetry Foundation describes the collection as “eclectically rigorous poems that reverberate with a Plathian edge and ear.”

In November 2022, Ecco Press published A Coastline Is an Immeasurable Thing: A Memoir Across Three Continents. In a starred review, Publishers Weekly outlines the memoir interspersing accounts of Nigerian history as the author reflects upon “her life on three continents, surrounded by stories that made up the fabric of her African upbringing.” The New York Times Book Review told subscribers to “read this book once for the furious beauty of Daniel's prose," then to "read it again for a master class in how we might finally come to tell our stories on our own terms.” It was named People’s Book of the Week and one of the Best Nonfiction Books of the Year by Kirkus Reviews, who called it “an absolutely fascinating work from a gifted storyteller” in their starred review.

Daniel's poetry has appeared in The Yale Review, The American Poetry Review, The Iowa Review, Indiana Review, Callaloo, New England Review, Prairie Schooner, Best New Poets, and elsewhere.

A Cave Canem Fellow, Daniel was twice shortlisted for the Brunel University African Poetry Prize. She is represented by the Wylie Agency

== Publications ==
- Mass for Shut-Ins (Yale University Press, 2023) ISBN 9780300267990
- A Coastline Is an Immeasurable Thing: A Memoir Across Three Continents (Ecco, 2022) ISBN 9780062960047
