= Mason and Dixon, Pennsylvania =

Unincorporated community in Pennsylvania, U.S.

Coordinates: 39°43′17″N 77°45′15″W

Mason and Dixon is an unincorporated community in Franklin County, in the U.S. state of Pennsylvania.

== History ==
The community lies at the Maryland—Pennsylvania state line, which once marked the Mason–Dixon line. A variant name was "Mason-Dixon". A post office called Mason And Dixon was established in 1868, and remained in operation until 1955.
