= Atlas Portland Cement Company =

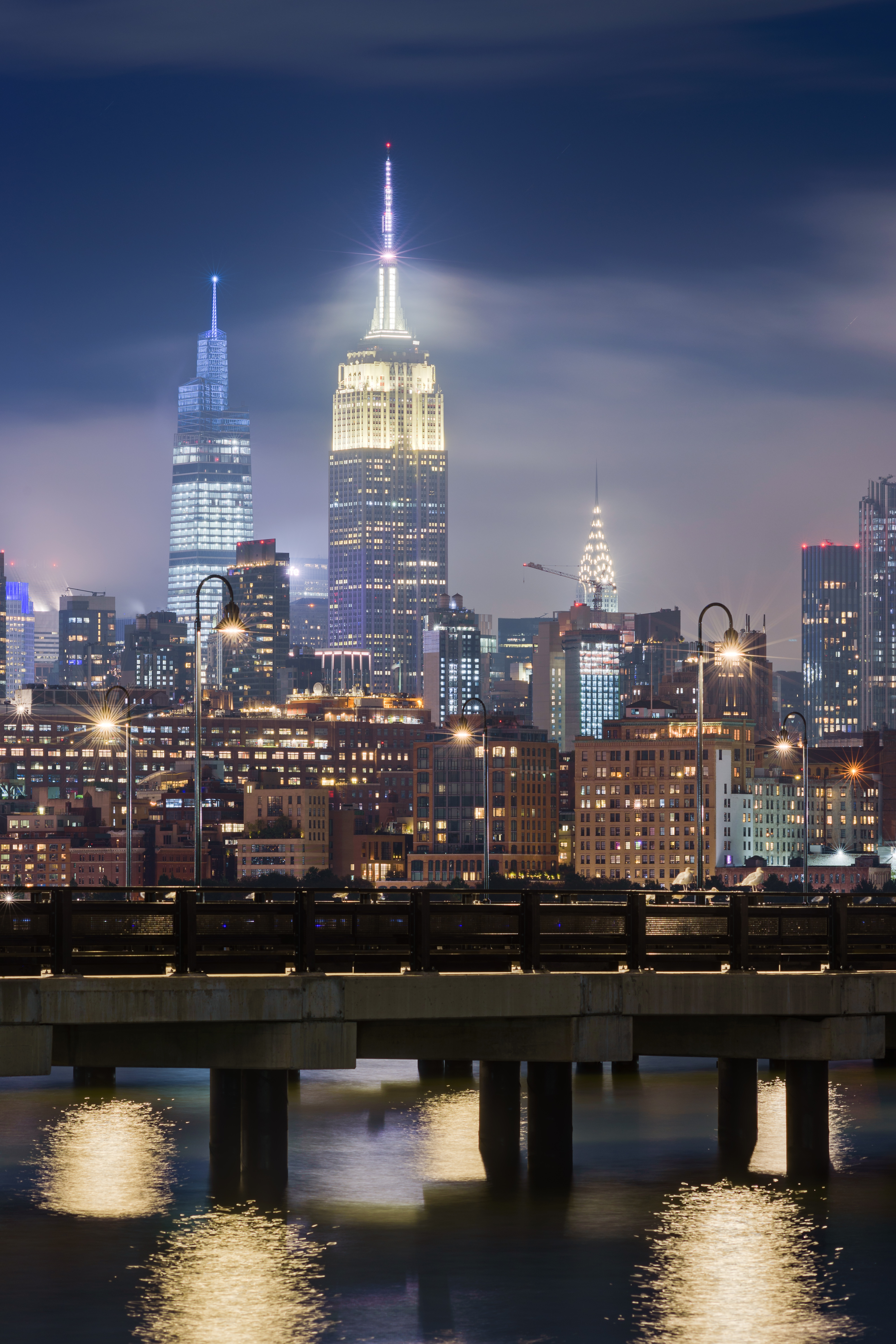
- The Empire State Building (center) in Midtown Manhattan was built with 151,000 barrels of Atlas Portland cement in the early 20th century
- Founded: 1895
- Defunct: 1982
- Headquarters: Northampton, Pennsylvania, U.S.
- Key people: Benjamin Franklin Affleck
- Products: Portland Cement

The Atlas Portland Cement Company, based in Northampton, Pennsylvania, was one of the largest cement companies of the world. Founded in Northampton in 1895, Atlas operated there until 1982 when it was bought out. It manufactured Portland cement, the most common type of cement in the world.

In the early 20th century, Atlas Portland Cement Company produced eight million barrels for the construction of the Panama Canal (1903-1914); its product was the majority of cement used on that project. For the construction of the Singer Building in New York City, 22,600 barrels of cement were used. Some 151,000 barrels of Atlas cement were used in constructing the Empire State Building, completed in 1931.

Atlas was among the dozens of cement companies that operated in the general vicinity of Northampton County, Pennsylvania in the Lehigh Valley region of eastern Pennsylvania. Changes in technology and automation mean that in the 21st century, 150-200 workers can do the work that used to take thousands of employees in the plants. The company's legacy is remembered and interpreted in the Atlas Cement Memorial Museum, which was founded in 1997 by Edward Pany, a former employee at the company and a history teacher.

== Management ==
Benjamin Franklin Affleck was president of the Universal Atlas Cement Company, after its merger with the Universal Portland Cement Company, from 1930 to 1936. He was noted by colleagues and area residents for his rise from humble beginnings in the company as a machinist to the head of sales, and later to presidency of the company. Affleck retired from the position just six years later, in 1936.

On March 2, 1921, Affleck and thirty-nine other officers of cement corporations were indicted by a federal grand jury under the Sherman Antitrust Act for restraint of trade and attempts at monopoly. The companies involved were alleged to have tightly controlled the supply of cement, refusing to sell any builder more than the amount needed for a single job, and preventing them from using any unexpected surplus on other jobs; prices quoted on cement were invariably the same to the penny.
