= Ilasco, Missouri =

Unincorporated community in Ralls County, Missouri, United States

Coordinates: 39.6714346°N 91.3107020°W

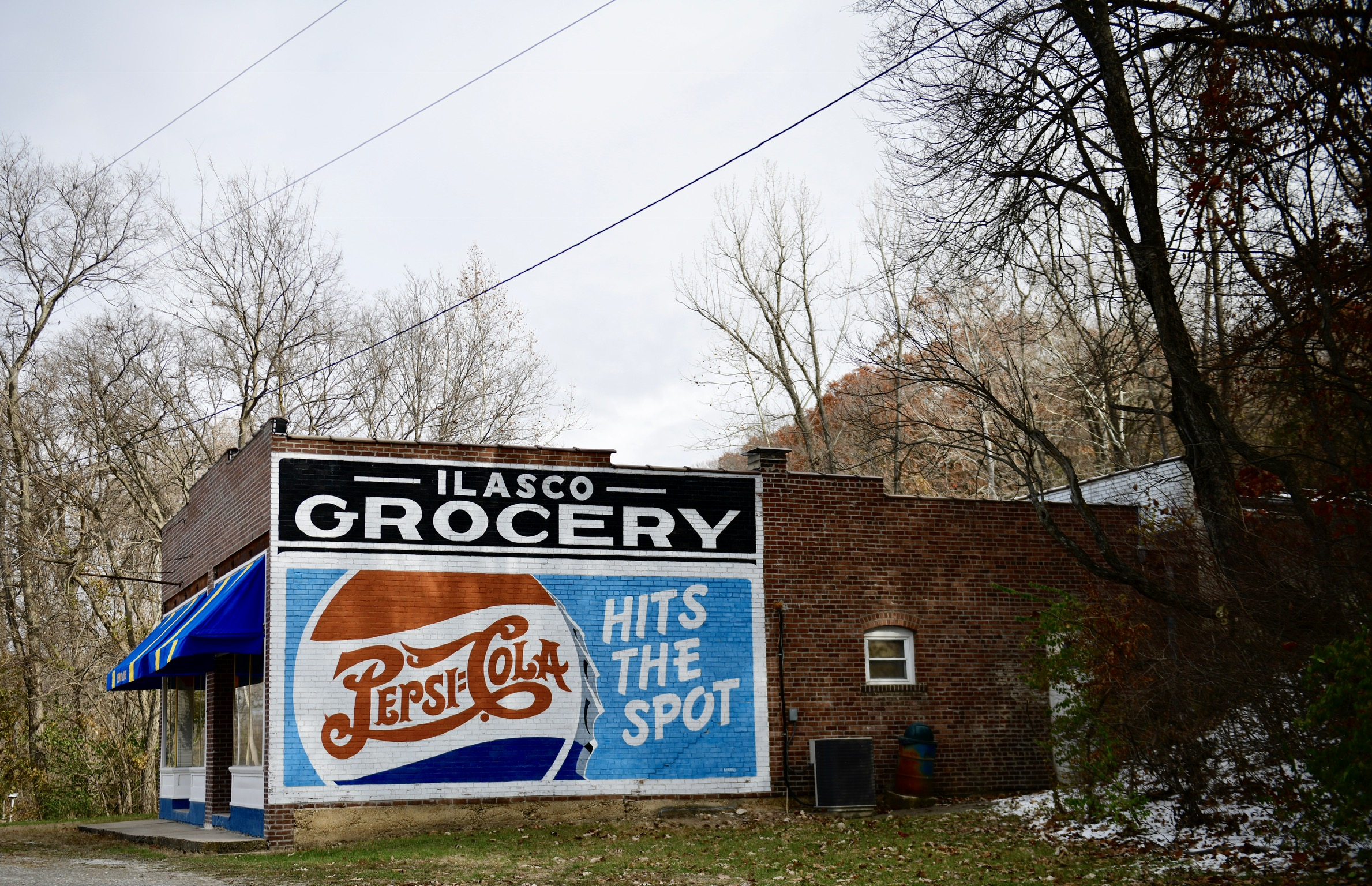
Ilasco Grocery Store, November 2018

Ilasco is an unincorporated community in Ralls County, Missouri, United States.

== History ==
Ilasco had its start as a cement factory company town; the name Ilasco is an acronym of cement components, namely iron, lime, aluminum, silica, carbon, and oxygen. A post office called Ilasco was established in 1919, and remained in operation until 1960.

The Ilasco Historic District was listed on the National Register of Historic Places in 2016.

== Notable person ==
Gregg Andrews, an historian, published author, and musician, was raised in Ilasco.
