= Mulford (surname) =

Mulford is a surname, and may refer to:

- Ali K. Mulford, New Zealand-American author
- Anna Isabel Mulford (c.1848–1943), American botanist
- Arthur Mulford (1871–1920), English footballer
- Chris Mulford (1941–2011), American La Leche League health activist
- Clarence E. Mulford (1883–1956), American writer
- David C. Mulford (born 1937), American diplomat
- Don Mulford (1915–2000), American politician from California
- Elisha Mulford (1833–1885), American religious minister and author
- Frederick Mulford (1881–1949), British agent and football promoter in Nigeria
- Jake Mulford (born 2004), English motorcycle speedway rider
- Prentice Mulford (1834–1891), American literary humorist and author
- Ralph Mulford (1884–1973), American racing driver
- Samuel "Fish Hook" Mulford (1644–1725), American colonial farmer, merchant and politician
- Sidney Mulford (1896–1973), English footballer
- Walter Mulford, American forester and academic 1877–1955)
- Wendy Mulford (born 1941), British poet
