= P32 =

P32 may refer to:

== Aircraft ==
- Boeing XP-32, a proposed American fighter
- Boulton Paul P.32, a British prototype night bomber
- Piaggio P.32, an Italian medium bomber

== Firearms ==
- Kel-Tec P-32, a pocket-sized pistol chambered in .32 ACP (7.65mm Browning)

== Trains ==
- P32-8, an American diesel-electric locomotive
- P32AC-DM, an American electro-diesel locomotive

== Other uses ==
- HMS P32 (1940), a submarine of the Royal Navy
- Husky Haven Airport, in Montrose, Pennsylvania, United States
- La Flèche (P32), a patrol boat of the Seychelles Coast Guard
- Lomwe language
- Papyrus 32, biblical manuscript
- Phosphorus-32, an isotope of phosphorus
- P3_{2}, three-dimensional space group number 145
