= Montrose Area School District =

School district in Pennsylvania, U.S.

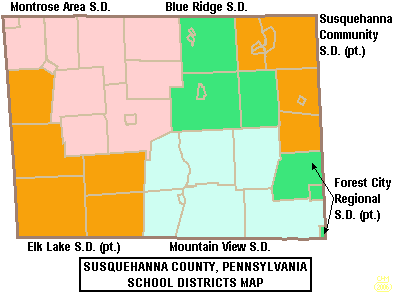

Address
- 75 Meteor Way Montrose, Susquehanna County, Pennsylvania, 18801; United States
- Coordinates: 41°50′34″N 75°50′43″W

Students and staff
- District mascot: Meteor

Other information
- Website: www.masd.info

The Montrose Area School District is a small, rural public school district that is located in northwestern Susquehanna County, Pennsylvania. It serves the following municipalities: Montrose, Bridgewater Township, Franklin Township, Liberty Township, Jessup Township, Forest Lake Township, Silver Lake Township, Little Meadows, Choconut Township, and Friendsville.

The district is one of the 500 public school districts of Pennsylvania.

== History and demographics ==
The Montrose Area School District encompasses approximately 228 square miles (590 km^{2}). According to 2000 federal census data, the district served a resident population of 11,708 people. By 2010, the district's population was 11,710 people.

The educational attainment levels for the school district population (twenty-five years of age and older) were 88.9% high school graduates and 16.9% college graduates.

According to the Pennsylvania Budget and Policy Center, 53.2% of the Montrose Area School District's pupils lived at 185% or below the Federal Poverty Level as shown by their eligibility for the federal free or reduced price school meal programs in 2012. In 2009, the district residents’ per capita income was $17,838, while the median family income was $43,199. In the Commonwealth, the median family income was $49,501 and the United States median family income was $49,445, in 2010. In Susquehanna County, the median household income was $48,231. By 2013, the median household income in the United States rose to $52,100. In 2014, the median household income in the USA was $53,700.

The Montrose Area School District operates three schools: Choconut Elementary School, Lathrop Street Elementary School, and Montrose Area Junior Senior High School. The sixth grade is provided in the elementary schools, and the seventh and eighth grades are provided in the junior/senior building. High school students may choose to attend the Susquehanna County Career Technology Center for training in the construction and mechanical trades. The Northeastern Educational Intermediate Unit IU19 provides the district with a wide variety of services like: specialized education for disabled students; state mandated training in recognizing and reporting child abuse; speech and visual disability services; criminal background check processing for prospective employees and professional development for staff and faculty.

== Extracurriculars ==
The Montrose Area School District offers a variety of clubs, activities and sports.

=== Sports ===
The district funds:

Varsity

Boys

- Baseball - AA
- Basketball- AA
- Cross country - AA
- Football - AA
- Golf - AA
- Soccer - A
- Tennis - AA
- Track and field - AA
- Wrestling - AA

Girls

- Basketball - AA
- Cross country - AA
- Golf - AA
- Soccer - A
- Softball - AA
- Tennis - AA
- Track and field - AA
- Volleyball - AA

Junior high middle school sports

Boys

- Baseball
- Basketball
- Cross country
- Football
- Golf
- Soccer
- Tennis
- Track and field
- Wrestling

Girls

- Basketball
- Cross country
- Field hockey
- Soccer
- Softball
- Tennis
- Track and field
- Volleyball

According to PIAA directory July 2015
