= Henry Harris Jessup =

American diplomat (1832–1910)

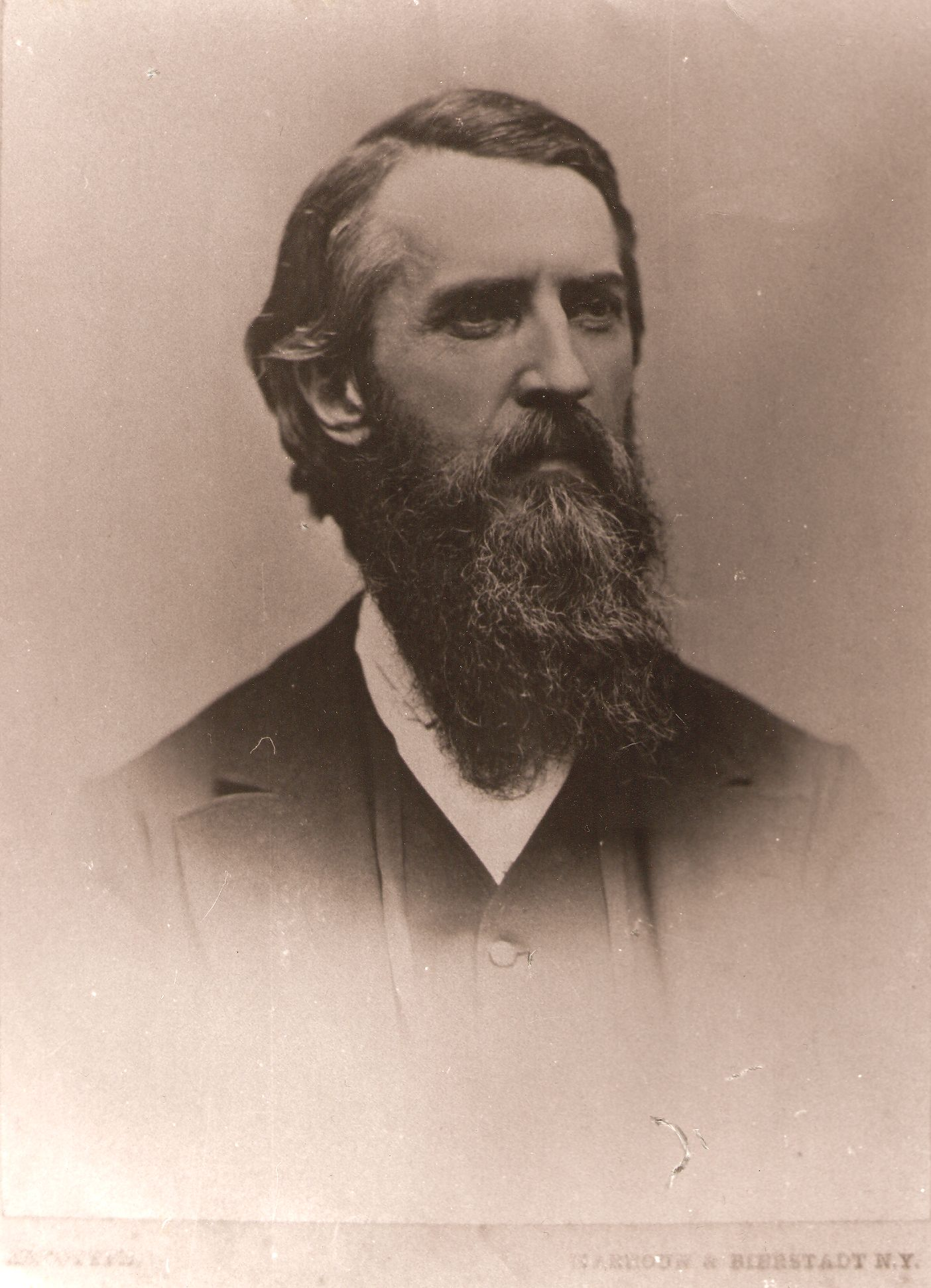
Henry Harris Jessup in 1869

Henry Harris Jessup (1832–1910) was an American Presbyterian missionary and author who devoted his distinguished career to evangelical missionary work in Syria (now Lebanon).

== Biography ==
He was born at Montrose, Pennsylvania, son of the jurist William Jessup (1797–1868). He was the grandfather of noted international jurist and diplomat Philip Jessup. He enrolled at Cortland Academy in Homer, New York for one year before attending Yale University. He graduated from Yale in 1851 and from Union Theological Seminary in 1855 at which point he was officially ordained; he immediately entered the foreign-missionary service of the Presbyterian church.

He spent his first four years of service in Tripoli, Lebanon, devoting much time to leaning Arabic at which he proved extremely deft. He married Caroline Bush during one trip back to America in 1857 and returned to Tripoli within a matter of months. During the Druse Revolts, the Jessups moved to Beirut and had three children. His wife took ill on sea voyage prescribed by a doctor and she died in Alexandria, Egypt. Jessup remarried in 1869 to Harriet Elizabeth Dodge with whom he had five children, though she too died in 1882. During one of his few trips back to America in 1884, Jessup married for the third and last time to Theodosia Davenport Lockwood.

Jessup served as the acting pastor for the Syrian Church of Beirut and superintendent of its school for thirty years, teaching almost any grade. He also became the first secretary of the Asfuriyeh Hospital for the Insane, acted for a time as missionary editor for the Arabic journal El-Neshrah. Serving and teaching in Beirut tirelessly, he refused a professorship at Union Seminary in 1857, a position as secretary of the Presbyterian Board in 1870, and the post of United States minister to Persia in 1883.

Jessup also authored numerous books about Syrian history, which culminated in the work for which he is best known, Fifty-Three Years in Syria published in 1910, a two-volume memoir and historical account of his life there. He died and was buried in Beirut. Ted Jessup, the American Television writer and producer is a great great grandson of Reverend Jessup.

== Writings ==
He wrote, besides various works for the American Press at Beirut:

- The Women of the Arabs (1873)
- Syrian Home Life (1874)
- The Mohammedan Missionary Problem (1879)
- The Greek Church and Protestant Missions (1884)
- The Setting of the Crescent and the Rising of the Cross (1898)
- Kamil, a Moslem Convert (1899)
- Fifty-Three Years in Syria (1910) – Volume 1, Volume 2.

=== Relating to the Bahá'í Faith ===
Jessup may have first encountered the religion following the petition sent by Persian Bahá'ís to the attention of the American government in 1867. Jessup presented about the Bahá´í Faith twice. The first was during the 1893 World Parliament of religions, which Baha'is consider to be the first public mention of the Baha'i Faith in North America, and the first public quoting on that continent of the words of Bahá'u'lláh, the Founder of the Baha'i Faith. Later Jessup also published in the Missionary Review.

Religious titles
| Preceded by The Rev. Francis Landey Patton | Moderator of the 91st General Assembly of the Presbyterian Church in the United States of America; 1879–1880 | Succeeded by The Rev. William M. Paxton |
