= Chris Snee =

American football player (born 1982)

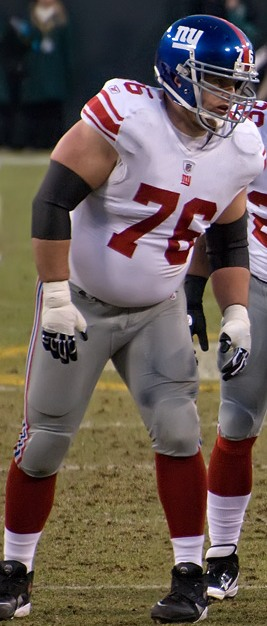
- Snee playing in the 2011 NFC Divisional Game

New York Giants
- Title: Scout

Personal information
- Born: January 18, 1982 (age 44); Edison, New Jersey, U.S.
- Listed height: 6 ft 3 in (1.91 m)
- Listed weight: 305 lb (138 kg)

Career information
- High school: Montrose (Montrose, Pennsylvania)
- College: Boston College
- NFL draft: 2004: 2nd round, 34th overall pick

Career history

Playing
- New York Giants (2004–2013)

Coaching
- Jacksonville Jaguars (2019) Scout; Boston College (2022–2023) Analyst; New York Giants (2024–present) Scout

Awards and highlights
- 2× Super Bowl champion (XLII, XLVI); First-team All-Pro (2008); 2× Second-team All-Pro (2009, 2010); 4× Pro Bowl (2008–2010, 2012); PFWA All-Rookie Team (2004); New York Giants Ring of Honor; 31st greatest New York Giant of all-time

Career NFL statistics
- Games played: 141
- Games started: 141
- Fumble recoveries: 6
- Stats at Pro Football Reference

Christopher Snee (born January 18, 1982) is an American former professional football player who spent his entire ten-year career as a guard for the New York Giants of the National Football League (NFL). He played college football for the Boston College Eagles and was chosen by the Giants in the second round of the 2004 NFL draft. Snee earned two Super Bowl rings with the Giants in Super Bowl XLII and Super Bowl XLVI.

== Early life ==
At Montrose High School, Snee was a two-time all-state selection, and a three-time All-Conference selection. He is believed to be the first NFL player ever to grow up in Susquehanna County, Pennsylvania. He was named the Regional Defensive Player of the Year in 1999. He was named Three-time All-Conference choice and a two-year All-Regional honoree. Snee played defense in high school and recorded 47 quarterback sacks in his three years as a starter on the defensive line. He led his team to the district title in 1997 and 1998. He totaled 101 tackles in his senior season and served as their team captain. Snee was a two-time All-Conference selection and team captain on the school's basketball team. He played in the 43rd annual Big 33 Football Classic, featuring the top players from Pennsylvania and Ohio.

== College career ==
Snee attended Boston College, where he played for the Boston College Eagles football team. He was a second-team All-America selection and an All-Big East Conference first-team choice by The NFL Draft Report in his final season at Boston College. In 2003, he started every game, including the San Francisco Bowl, at right guard, providing excellent blocking as tailback Derrick Knight ranked fourth in the nation in rushing with 1,721 yards. He started every game at left guard in 2002, helping the team finish third in the Big East in total offense (5,074 yards) and second in passing yards (3,010). Snee was third-team Freshman All-America selection by Sporting News in 2001 and was a member of the Big East's All-Freshman team. He played in nine games, starting the final six contests. He made his first career start vs. Virginia Tech at right tackle before shifting to right guard for the Pittsburgh contest.

== Professional career ==
Pre-draft measurables
Height	Weight	Arm length	Hand span	40-yard dash	10-yard split	20-yard split	20-yard shuttle	Three-cone drill	Vertical jump	Broad jump	Bench press
6 ft 2 3/4 in (1.90 m)	314 lb (142 kg)	31 3/8 in (0.80 m)	9 1/4 in (0.23 m)	5.07 s	1.75 s	2.93 s	4.66 s	7.75 s	30.5 in (0.77 m)	8 ft 8 in (2.64 m)	29 reps
All values from NFL Combine

Snee gave up his final year of college eligibility to make himself eligible for the NFL draft. The New York Giants selected Snee in the second round (34th overall) of the 2004 NFL draft. The New York Giants' head coach at the time of the draft, Tom Coughlin, was Snee's father-in-law.

He made his NFL debut against the Philadelphia Eagles, where he helped Tiki Barber rush for 125 yards on nine carries, including a 72-yard score. He missed the final five games of the season after waking up the morning of the game against the Washington Redskins with an inflamed gland just beneath his jaw. He arrived at the stadium early, but there was no progress in his condition prior to the time the Giants had to submit their list of inactive players. The condition did not improve enough for him to play again in the 2004 NFL season.

As a rookie in 2004, Snee started all 11 games in which he played at right guard, a job he won in training camp. Snee and the line provided enough run blocking for Barber again for him to rush for a then team record 220 yards vs. the Kansas City Chiefs. He also helped blocking against the Oakland Raiders and helped Barber rush for 203 yards, including a team-record 95-yard touchdown. His pass blocking enabled Eli Manning to pass for 3,762 yards, the 5th-highest total in franchise history. Snee also provided enough run blocking for Barber to rush for a franchise record 1,860 yards. He was then selected as a fourth alternate to the NFC Pro Bowl team.

In 2005, Snee started all 16 regular season games and the NFC Wild Card Game at right guard. Against the Washington Redskins, the line allowed one sack and helped the Giants rush for 261 rushing yards, their highest total since they ran for 262 yards on October 30, 2005. In the NFC Wild Card game against the Philadelphia Eagles, the line allowed one sack and provided enough blocking for the Giants to rush for 151 yards on 31 carries. He was later voted as third alternate to the 2006 Pro Bowl. Snee provided enough run blocking for the Giants offense to rush for 2,156 yards, the seventh-highest total in the NFL.

In 2006, Snee started all 16 regular season games and the NFC Wild Card Game at right guard. Against the Atlanta Falcons, the line allowed one sack and provided enough protection for the Giants offense to gain 491 yards of total offense. Snee and the line allowed just four total sacks in a 5-game period from Sept. 30 – Oct. 28. In week 17 Snee helped Tiki Barber rush for a franchise record 234 yards in a playoff-clinching win against the Washington Redskins. In that game, Barber had three runs of 50 yards or more, two of them for touchdowns.

In 2007, Snee started all 16 regular season games and the Giants' four postseason games. He was an integral part of an offense that helped the Giants score 373 points (the fifth-highest total in franchise history) and compile 321 first downs (the fourth-highest total by a Giants team) and 5,302 yards (seventh in team history). The line's blocking enabled the Giants to finish fourth in the NFL in rushing yardage with an average of 134.3 yards a game. Snee also enabled the Giants to rush for 289 yards in a playoff-clinching victory against the Buffalo Bills, their highest total in 22 years. He also started every game in which he's played (59 regular season and six postseason) at right guard. Snee entered the 2008 season with 48 consecutive regular season starts, the third-longest streak on the Giants behind David Diehl (80) and Eli Manning (55).

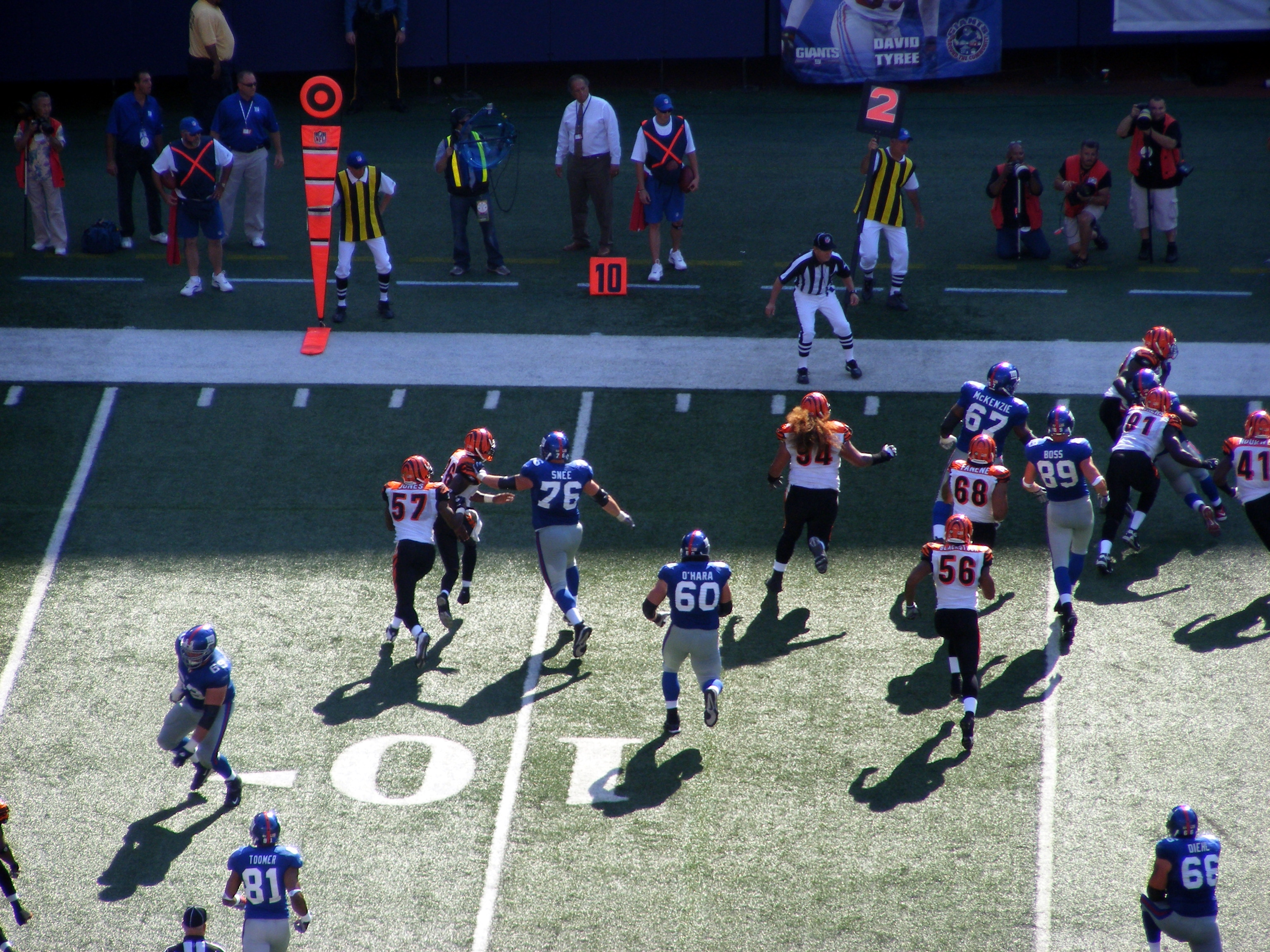
Chris Snee

Snee reportedly signed a new six-year contract extension to remain a Giant through the 2014 season. The deal has a base salary of $41.25 million and includes $17 million in guarantees. Snee also gets a $13.5 million signing bonus and can earn another $2 million in incentives. $23 million will be available in the first three seasons and his annual base average is $6.875 million.

Snee's strong play in 2008 earned him his first Pro Bowl selection as one of the NFC's starting guards. He was ranked 77th by his fellow players on the NFL Top 100 Players of 2011.

At the end of the 2011 season, Snee and the Giants appeared in Super Bowl XLVI. He started in the game as the Giants defeated the New England Patriots by a score of 21–17 giving him his second Super Bowl title.

Snee was selected to the 2013 Pro Bowl and had hip surgery after the event.

In October 2013, Snee was put on the injured reserve list and was out for the rest of the season due to an injured hip.

Snee announced his retirement from the NFL on July 21, 2014.

== Post–playing career ==
=== Jacksonville Jaguars ===
On May 30, 2017, Snee was hired by his former coach with the Giants, father-in-law, and former Jacksonville Jaguars' executive vice-president Tom Coughlin to be a scout for the Jacksonville Jaguars. He acted as a coaching assistant and helped offensive line coach Pat Flaherty and assistant offensive line coach Tony Sparano Jr. with the offensive linemen throughout training camp.

=== Boston College ===
On August 23, 2022, Snee was hired as an analyst under head coach Jeff Hafley.

=== New York Giants ===
On May 7, 2024, Snee joined the New York Giants as a scout.

== Personal life ==
Snee is the son of Diane and Ed Snee, and has three brothers: Edward, Daniel and Shaun (Director of Strength & Conditioning, Denver Broncos). He graduated from Montrose Area Jr./Sr. High School in Montrose, Pennsylvania in 2000.

Snee married Kate Coughlin, daughter of former New York Giants coach Tom Coughlin. They have four children together.
