= Montrose Area Junior Senior High School =

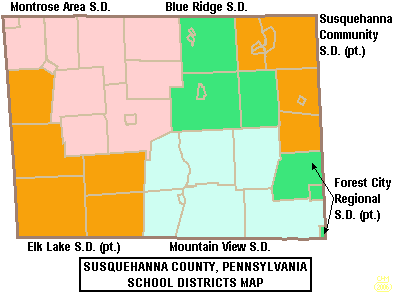

Location
- 50 High School Road; Montrose, Susquehanna County, Pennsylvania 18801; United States of America
- Coordinates: 41.8428°N 75.8453°W

Information
- Type: Public
- Principal: Terrence Whalen
- Faculty: 56 (2013)
- Language: English
- Mascot: Meteor
- Feeder schools: Choconut Elementary School, Lathrop Street Elementary School
- Website: https://mahs.masd.info/

Montrose Area Junior Senior High School is located at 50 High School Road, Montrose, Susquehanna County, Pennsylvania. In 2015, enrollment was reported as 710 pupils in 7th through 12th grades. Montrose Area Junior Senior High School employed 56 teachers. Montrose Area Junior Senior High School is the sole high school and junior high school operated by the Montrose Area School District.

Montrose Area Junior Senior High School students may choose to attend the Susquehanna County Career Technology Center for training in the construction and mechanical trades. In 2015, 65 pupils chose to attend the tech school. The home school district provides transportation to and from the school each day. The Northeastern Educational Intermediate Unit IU19 provides the school with a wide variety of services like: specialized education for disabled students, including those who are visually and hearing impaired; state mandated recognizing and reporting child abuse training; speech and visual disability services; criminal background check processing for prospective employees and professional development for staff and faculty.

== Extracurriculars ==
The Montrose Area Junior Senior High School offers a variety of clubs, activities and an extensive sports program.

=== Sports ===
The district funds:

Varsity

Boys

- Baseball - AA
- Basketball- AA
- Cross country - AA
- Football - AA
- Golf - AA
- Soccer - A
- Tennis - AA
- Track and field - AA
- Wrestling - AA

Girls

- Basketball - AA
- Cross country - AA
- Golf - AA
- Soccer - A
- Softball - AA
- Tennis - AA
- Track and field - AA
- Volleyball - AA

Junior high middle school sports

Boys

- Baseball
- Basketball
- Cross country
- Football
- Golf
- Soccer
- Tennis
- Track and field
- Wrestling

Girls

- Basketball
- Cross country
- Field hockey
- Soccer
- Softball
- Tennis
- Track and field
- Volleyball

According to PIAA directory July 2015
