= Salt Springs State Park =

State park in Pennsylvania, United States

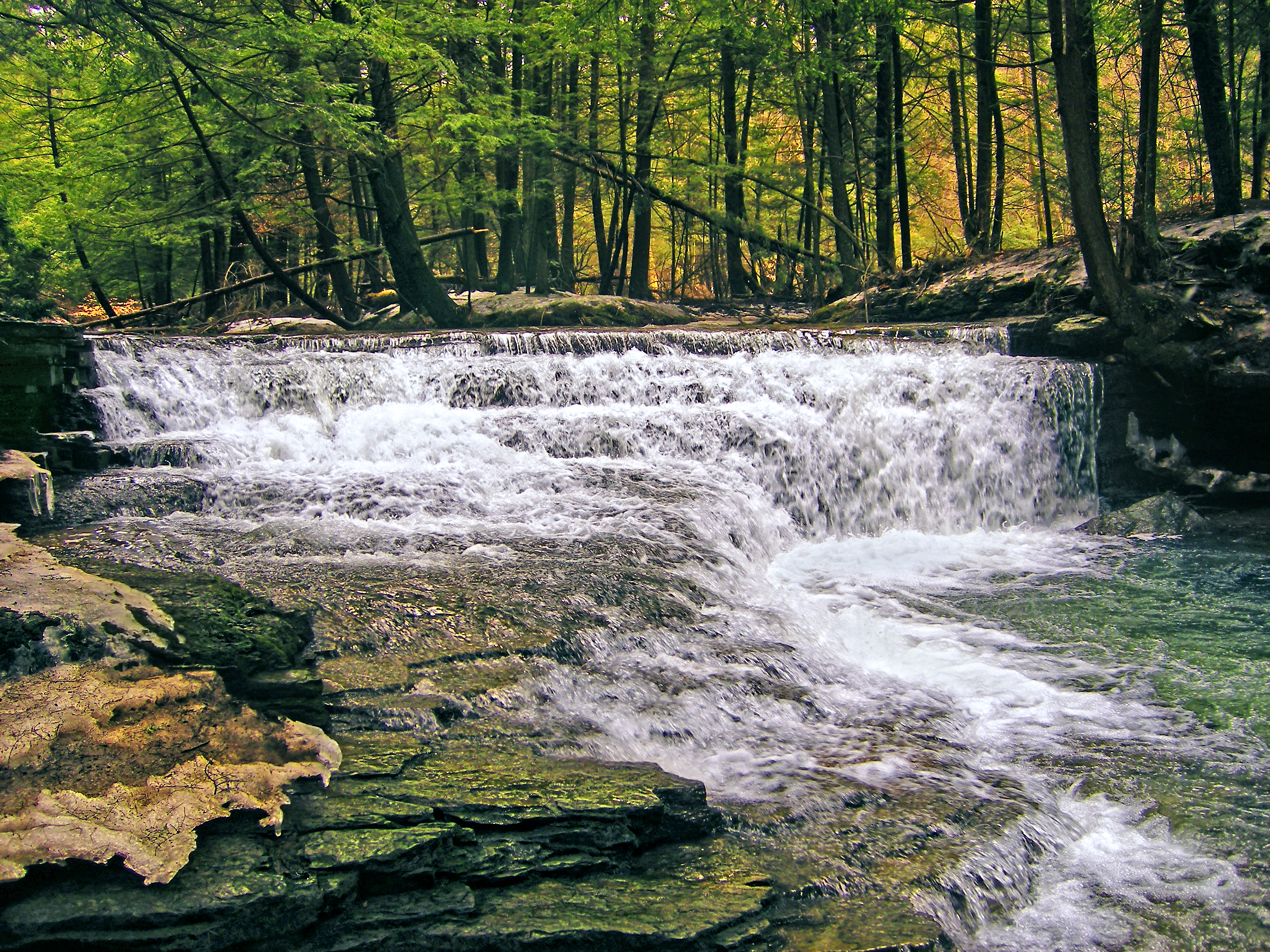
- Fall Brook

- Location within Pennsylvania Location within the United States
- Interactive map of Salt Springs State Park
- Location: Franklin Township, Susquehanna County, Pennsylvania, United States
- Coordinates: 41°54′43″N 75°51′56″W
- Area: 405 acres (164 ha)
- Elevation: 1,211 feet (369 m)
- Established: 1973
- Administrator: Pennsylvania Department of Conservation and Natural Resources
- Website: Official website
- Pennsylvania State Parks

Salt Springs State Park is a Pennsylvania state park in Franklin Township, Susquehanna County, Pennsylvania, in the United States. The park is home to massive hemlock trees that are over 500 years old and are among the largest trees in all of Pennsylvania. The Fall Brook Natural Area within the park is recognized as a part of the Old-Growth Forest Network. The park also features a gorge with three waterfalls on Fall Brook. Salt Springs State Park is 7 miles (11 km) north of Montrose, just off Pennsylvania Route 29. The park is the only state park in Pennsylvania that is managed by a non-profit organization, the Friends of Salt Springs Park. The state owns 405 acres (164 ha) of land and the Friends own an additional 437 acres (177 ha) bringing the total amount of protected land to 842 acres (341 ha).

== History ==
=== Hemlocks ===
The first settlers came to the Salt Springs area in the 1790s, and found an area of unbroken forest that was dominated by the eastern hemlock tree. The settlers focused on clearing the land for farming. Many of the trees were simply burned, while others were used to build log cabins. Eventually the settlers began stripping the hemlocks of their bark for use in tanneries, while other trees were harvested for the lumber industry. Sawmills soon appeared on Silver Creek and other streams in the area. However, not all the old hemlocks were harvested. Those still standing in and about Fall Brook Gorge were left because the area had become a recreation destination as soon as the early 19th century.

=== Salty Springs ===
Salt Springs State Park is named for the salt springs found on the south side of Fall Brook. The Native Americans of the area used the springs as a salt supply for many years. The settlers also extracted salt from the waters of Salt Spring. Numerous entrepreneurs attempted to extract salt from the springs for a profit, but most failed because it simply was not possible to extract enough salt.

=== Oil prospecting ===
Oil prospectors were the next group to try to make a living from the Salt Springs area. Pennsylvania was in the midst of an oil boom in the late 19th century after oil had been discovered near Titusville, 280 miles to the west. The North Penn Oil and Gas Company sunk a test well in 1902. They quickly failed, plugged the well and left the area. Methane gas escaped from the well and was used by the Wheaton family, owners of a nearby dairy farm. They used this gas, released by the oil prospectors, for many years to provide lighting for their home and gas for their stove.

=== From farm to state park ===
The non-profit organization, "Friends of Salt Springs Park", was established in 1994 to help protect and preserve the park. Pennsylvania had acquired the land in 1973, but had been financially unable to preserve the historic buildings or develop the parks lands. When the historic buildings on the former Wheaton Farm were slated to be demolished, a group of concerned citizens teamed together to preserve the farm buildings and develop the park. They signed a 10-year contract with Susquehanna County to become the caretakers of the park in 1995. The contract was renewed in 2005, 2010, and 2012.

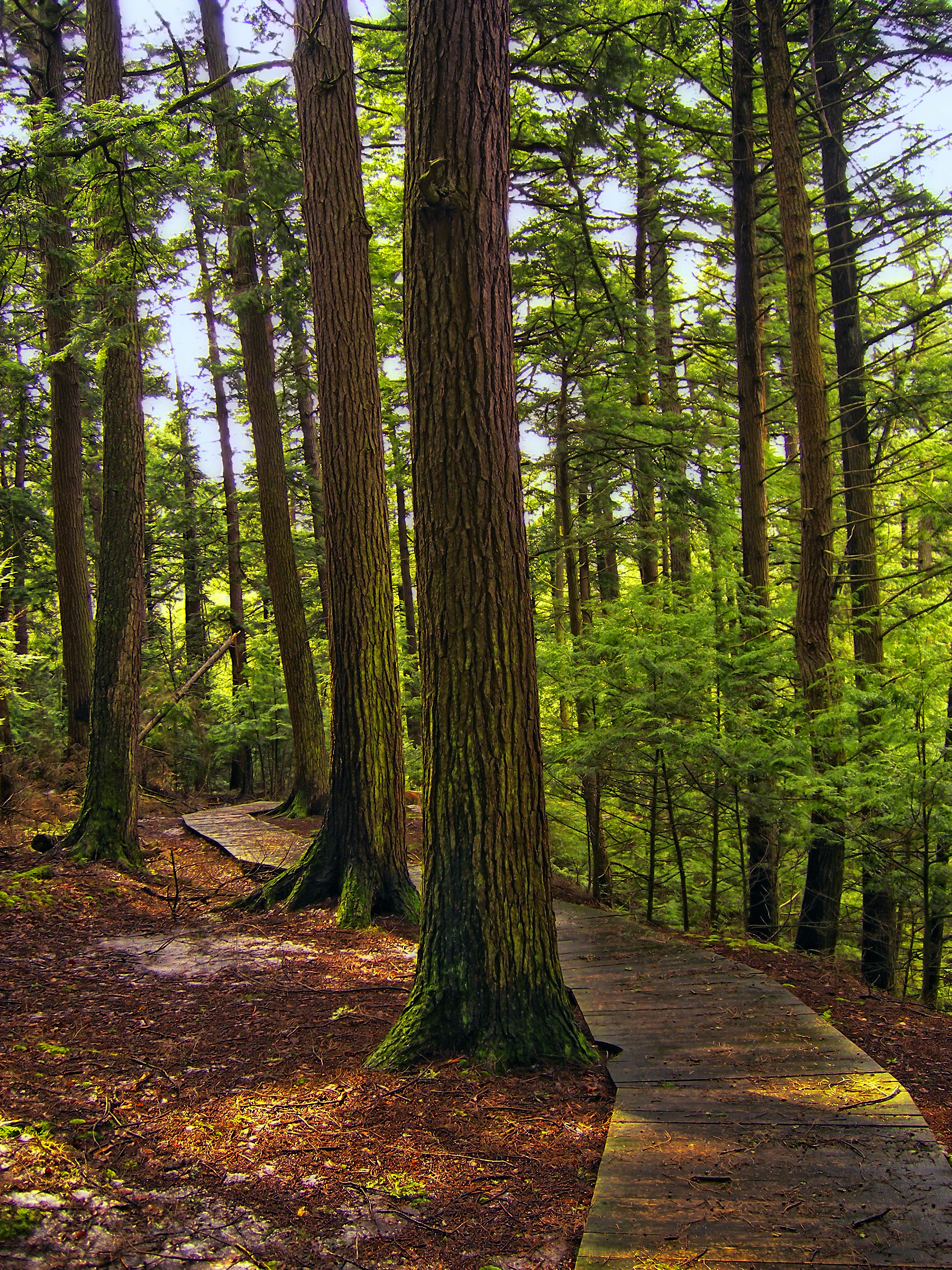
A stand of hemlocks along Hemlock Trail at Salt Springs State Park

The Wheaton family owned the lands of Salt Springs State Park from 1840 until 1973, when they sold their land to the Commonwealth of Pennsylvania. The family established a dairy farm on the land and invited tourists to enjoy the towering hemlocks and Fall Brook Gorge.

The buildings of the Wheaton farm are used today by the park for numerous purposes. Wheaton House, a timber framed post and beam structure crafted from eastern hemlock, holds the offices of "The Friends of Salt Springs Park". A second farm house provides rental income to help support the Friends' work. A carriage barn next to the Wheaton House is built entirely of hemlock timbers with hand hewn beams and sawed posts. It also has a foundation of native stone, built without mortar. It and the dairy barn provide space for programs, historical displays, and events.

== Recreation ==
All of the park is open to hunting, except for the 30 acres designated as a nature preserve in the Fall Brook Gorge area. Hunters are expected to follow the rules and regulations of the Pennsylvania Game Commission. The common game species are ruffed grouse, squirrels, turkey, and white-tailed deer. The hunting of groundhogs is prohibited. Fall Brook and Silver Creek are designated trout fisheries by the Pennsylvania Fish and Boat Commission, which stocks the streams with trout prior to the spring trout season.

Salt Springs State Park has 14 sites for rustic tent camping and 3 cottages that are available for rent on a weekly or nightly basis.

There are several small picnic areas between Silver Creek and Fall Brook with tables and grills. There is also a pavilion located near the West meadow.

=== Trails ===
Salt Springs State Park has 15.65 miles of trails that are open to hiking and cross-country skiing. These trails pass through old-growth forest, overlook the gorge, and wind their way through fields and woods.

Fall Brook Trail - is a 1 mile difficult trail that is marked with red blazes. The trail begins across the creek from Wheaton House and follows Fall Brook up a steep hill and passes three waterfalls. Fall Brook Trail ends at Bunny Trail.
Silver Creek Trail is a 1-1/2 mile easy trail that is marked with red blazes. It begins behind a dairy barn and follows Silver Creek through a forest of hemlocks with a fern understory. The trail ends with a steep climb through a hardwood forest near Meadow Trail.
Meadow Trail is a 0.8-mile (1.3 km) easy trail that is marked with yellow blazes. It is reached from the Silver Creek Trail or Buckley Road. Meadow Trail is a loop that passes through meadows and by relict stone foundations.
Hemlock Trail is a 0.4-mile (0.64 km) moderate trail that is not marked. The trail passes through an old-growth forest of eastern hemlock and reaches Salt Springs gorge. A gorge observation platform is accessed from Hemlock Trail. This trail also beholds the tourist attraction of layered rocks which have been filled with pennies for good luck.

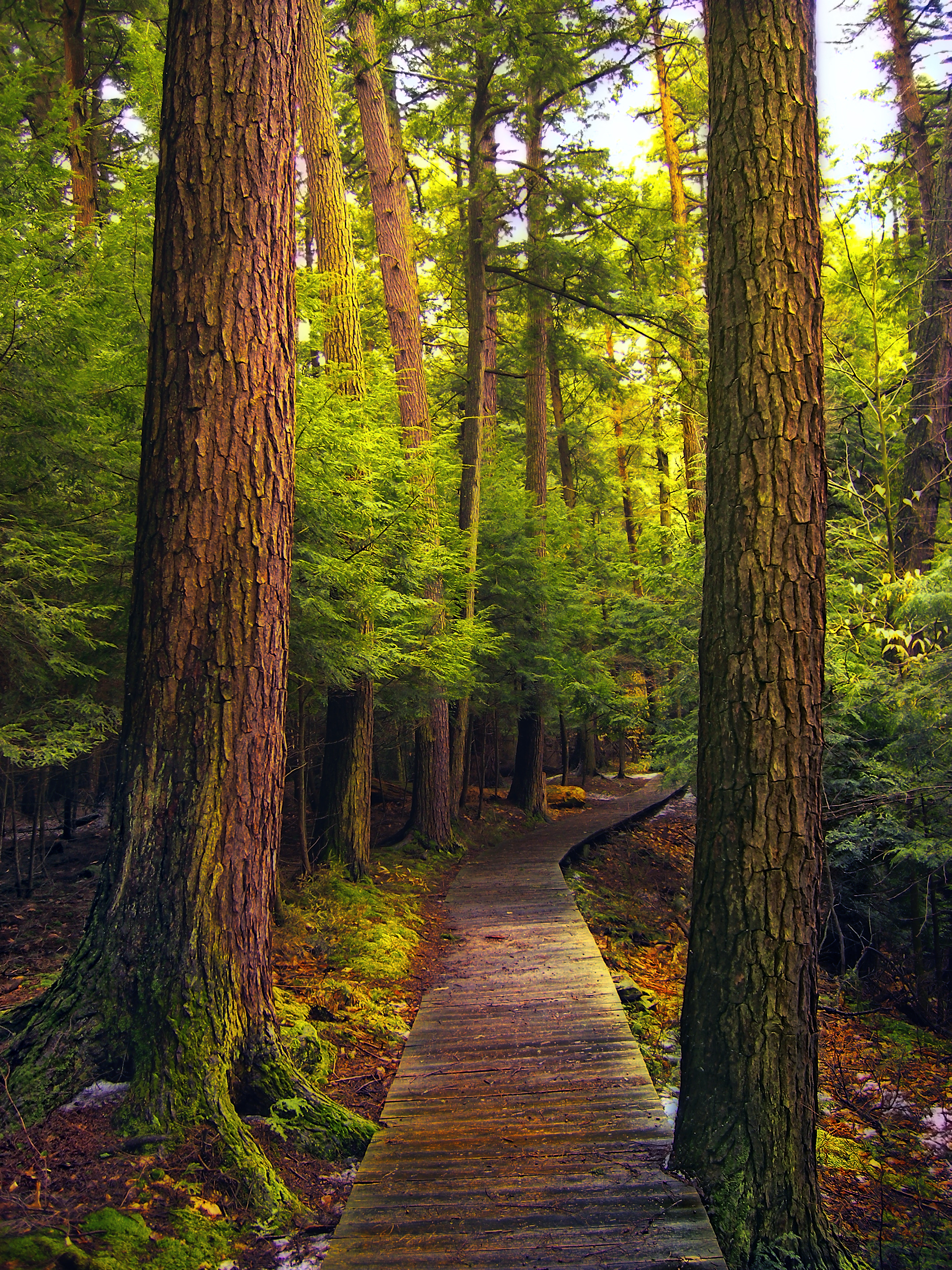
Another view of some hemlocks along Hemlock Trail

Woodland Trail is a 0.25-mile (0.40 km) easy trail that is marked with blue blazes. It loops off Hemlock Trail through the old growth forest. Hikers will need to climb over or go around a 300-year-old hemlock that has fallen across the trail.
Hardwood Trail is a 0.5-mile (0.80 km) moderate trail that is marked with yellow blazes. The trail begins at the picnic area and ends at Woodland Trail. It passes through a stand of mixed hardwoods.
Upland Trail is a 0.5-mile (0.80 km) moderate trail that is marked with red blazes. It loops off Hardwood Trail and climbs a hillside that his covered with mixed hardwoods.
Bunny Trail is a 1.5-mile (2.4 km) moderate trail that is marked with orange blazes. It is a loop that begins and ends at a parking lot that is off Buckley Road. The trail passes through a mixed forest and by several springs.
Cliff Trail is a 1.5-mile (2.4 km) moderate trail that is marked with blue blazes. It closely follows Bunny Trail in some places. Cliff Trail passes by ferns, a pond and large boulders.
Connector Trail is a 1.7-mile (2.7 km) easy trail that is marked with white blazes. It connects Wetland Trail and Fall Brook Trail. The trail goes through a ravine and crosses the Wetland Trail bridge.
Wetland Trail is a 0.6-mile (0.97 km) easy trail that is marked with blue blazes. It runs along the south bank of Fall Brook and passes through a wetland.
Summit Trail is a 1-mile (1.6 km) moderate trail that is marked with red blazes. It climbs a gentle rise on the Friends of Salt Springs State Park property. The summit is relatively flat and is covered with a mix of widely spaced trees.
Overlook Trail is the shortest trail in Salt Springs State Park at just 0.2-mile (0.32 km). It was designed with handicapped accessibility in mind. It connects the falls overlook with a parking lot and Fall Brook Trail.
Friends Trail is a moderate 1.9-mile (3.1 km) trail marked with white blazes. It is accessed from either the Hardwood Trail, with which it connects, or from the parking lot on Buckley Road. From Hardwood Trail, it meanders south, crosses Buckley Road, and continues through a meadow, into woodlands, along an old logging trail, and through re-growth forest before connecting to Summit Trail.
Gorge Trail is a moderate 0.5-mile (0.80 km) trail marked with blue blazes. It runs between Buckley Road and Salt Springs Road, along the west rim of the Fall Brook gorge. From Salt Springs Road, after a short, but rigorous ascent, it levels out and meanders a bit between the top of the gorge and an outcropping of shale (which the Wheatons "mined" for their own use).
Border Trail is a moderate to difficult 2.1-mile (3.4 km) trail marked with blue blazes. It begins behind the dairy barn, following Silver Creek Trail into the woods. When Silver Creek branches off to the left, the Border Trail continues straight until it reaches the western park border. Then it bears right and continues north, eventually curving right again and returning to Silver Creek Trail.
