= Sylvanus Mulford House =

Historic house in Pennsylvania, United States

- U.S. National Register of Historic Places
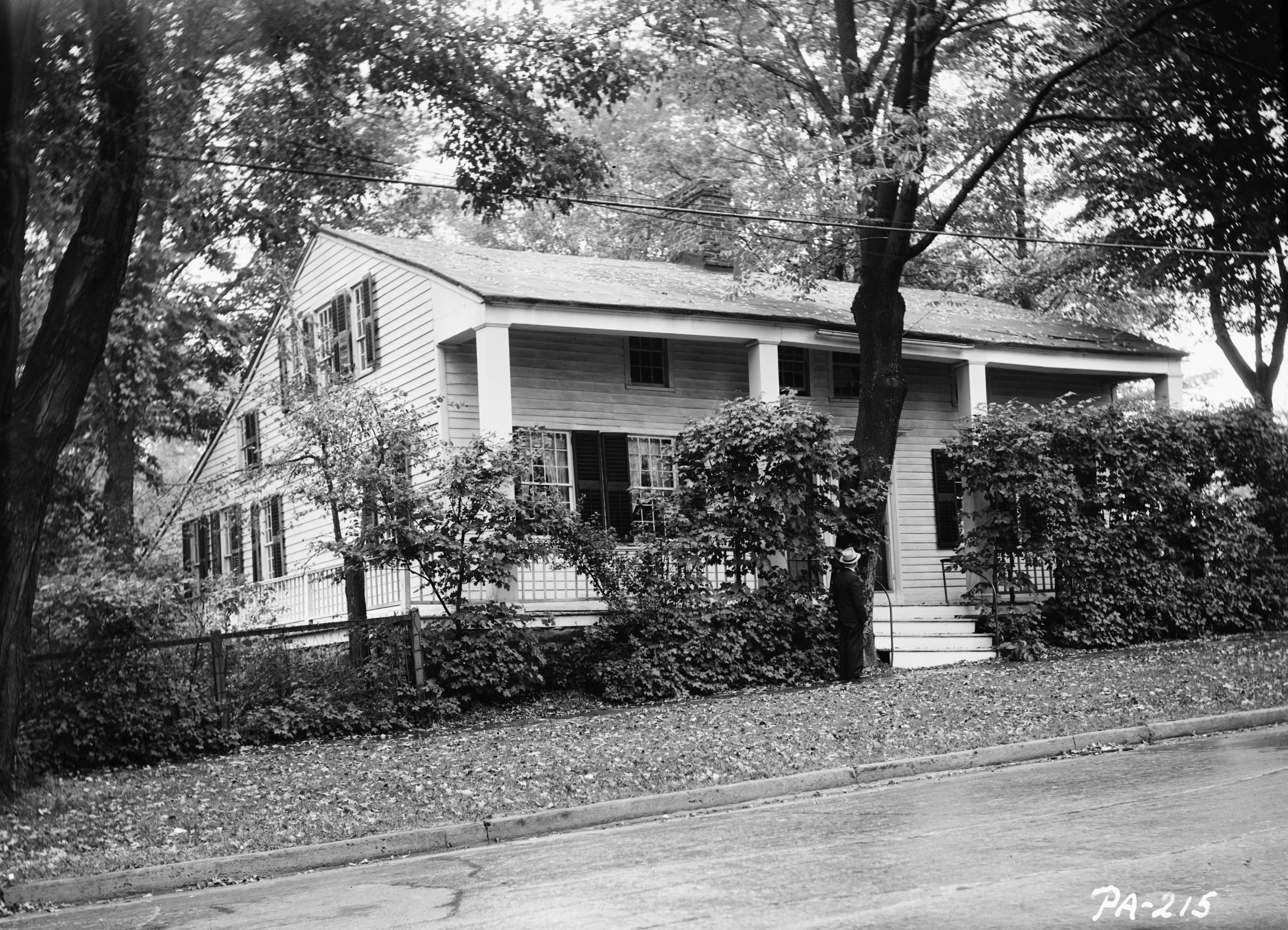
- Sylvanus Mulford House, HABS photo, October 1936

- Location within Pennsylvania Location within the United States
- Location: 65 Church St., Montrose, Pennsylvania
- Coordinates: 41°49′55″N 75°52′34″W
- Area: 0.3 acres (0.12 ha)
- Built: 1818
- Built by: Mulford, Sylvanus
- Architectural style: New England Saltbox
- NRHP reference No.: 78002473
- Added to NRHP: May 22, 1978

The Sylvanus Mulford House, also known as the John Lyons House, is an historic home that is located in Montrose, Susquehanna County, Pennsylvania, United States.

It was added to the National Register of Historic Places in 1978.

== History and architectural features ==
Built in 1818, this historic structure is a two-story, frame, Saltbox-style dwelling that sits on a stone foundation and measures forty feet by forty-seven feet. It has a full-width front porch that is supported by four large columns. Connected to the house is a two-story, frame barn that was built in 1856.
