= Emily C. Blackman =

American schoolteacher and historian (1826–1907)

- Born: Emily Clarissa Blackman; July 15, 1826; Gilbertsville, New York, U.S.
- Died: 1907 (aged 80–81)
- Education: Montrose Academy
- Occupation(s): Schoolteacher, historian
- Notable work: History of Susquehanna County, Pennsylvania (1873)
- Parent(s): Dr. Josiah Blackman, Clarissa Blackman (née Camp)

Emily Clarissa Blackman (1826–1907) was an American schoolteacher and historian from Susquehanna County, Pennsylvania. Her teaching career began at the Montrose Academy at the age of fifteen; during her life, she taught in several states. She also published a book of Susquehanna County history in 1873. Blackman was an active Presbyterian and was active in several organizations, including the Women's Christian Temperance Union.

== Early life ==
Blackman was born in Gilbertsville, New York, on July 15, 1826. Her parents were Dr. Josiah Blackman (1794–1875) and Clarissa Blackman (née Camp; d. 1864). In 1829, they moved to Binghamton, New York. In 1836, they moved again, this time to Montrose, Pennsylvania. She gained much of her early education at the Montrose Academy. At some point, she studied music in New York City and Philadelphia.

Blackman had two sisters, neither of whom were alive in 1900.

== Career ==
Blackman became an assistant teacher at the Montrose Academy in 1841 or 1842 at the age of 15. She went on to teach at schools in Towanda and Chester, Pennsylvania, as well as in Wisconsin and Illinois. Blackman taught a range of subjects, including music. Between 1866 and 1868, she also taught at a Freedman's School in Okolona, Mississippi.

In 1873, after four years of research and writing, Blackman published a history of Susquehanna County, Pennsylvania. It was titled History of Susquehanna County, Pennsylvania and was published in Philadelphia by Claxton, Remsen, & Haffelfinger. The book was well received by critics at the time, and has been described as "a most carefully compiled and meritorious work, in the preparation of which she spent four years of earnest and painstaking research and labor" as well as "excellent and commendable". She also frequently contributed articles and letters to the local press.

== Activism and personal life ==
Blackman traveled extensively during her life, crossing the continent twice and going overseas twice, in 1878 and 1889. From 1890 onward, she began spending time in Florida due to poor health; by 1900, she had spent nine winters and four summers there.

Blackman was allegedly capable of reading the Bible in ten languages. She also spoke fluent French and German.

Blackman was an active Presbyterian, having been a member of that church since the age of twelve. Throughout her life, she often participated in church work and its auxiliary societies. She was also involved in Home and Foreign Missions and during the American Civil War was involved in the Soldiers' Aid Society and Sanitary Commission, the Freedman's Aid Society, and the Women's Christian Temperance Union. Along with Mary C. Sayre, she was one of two delegates from Montrose to attend the first meeting of the Women's Christian Temperance Union in Pennsylvania, in Philadelphia.

Blackman died in 1907 at the age of 80 or 81.

== Legacy ==
In 1900, Blackman was described as being "one of the well-known characters of northern Pennsylvania".

Blackman was the first historian of Susquehanna County, Pennsylvania. She was described as having led a "fascinating life" in the Susquehanna County Transcript. In January 2009, she was the subject of a report given at the annual meeting of the Susquehanna County Historical Society and Free Library Association in Montrose.
