= Susquehanna County Courthouse Complex =

- U.S. National Register of Historic Places
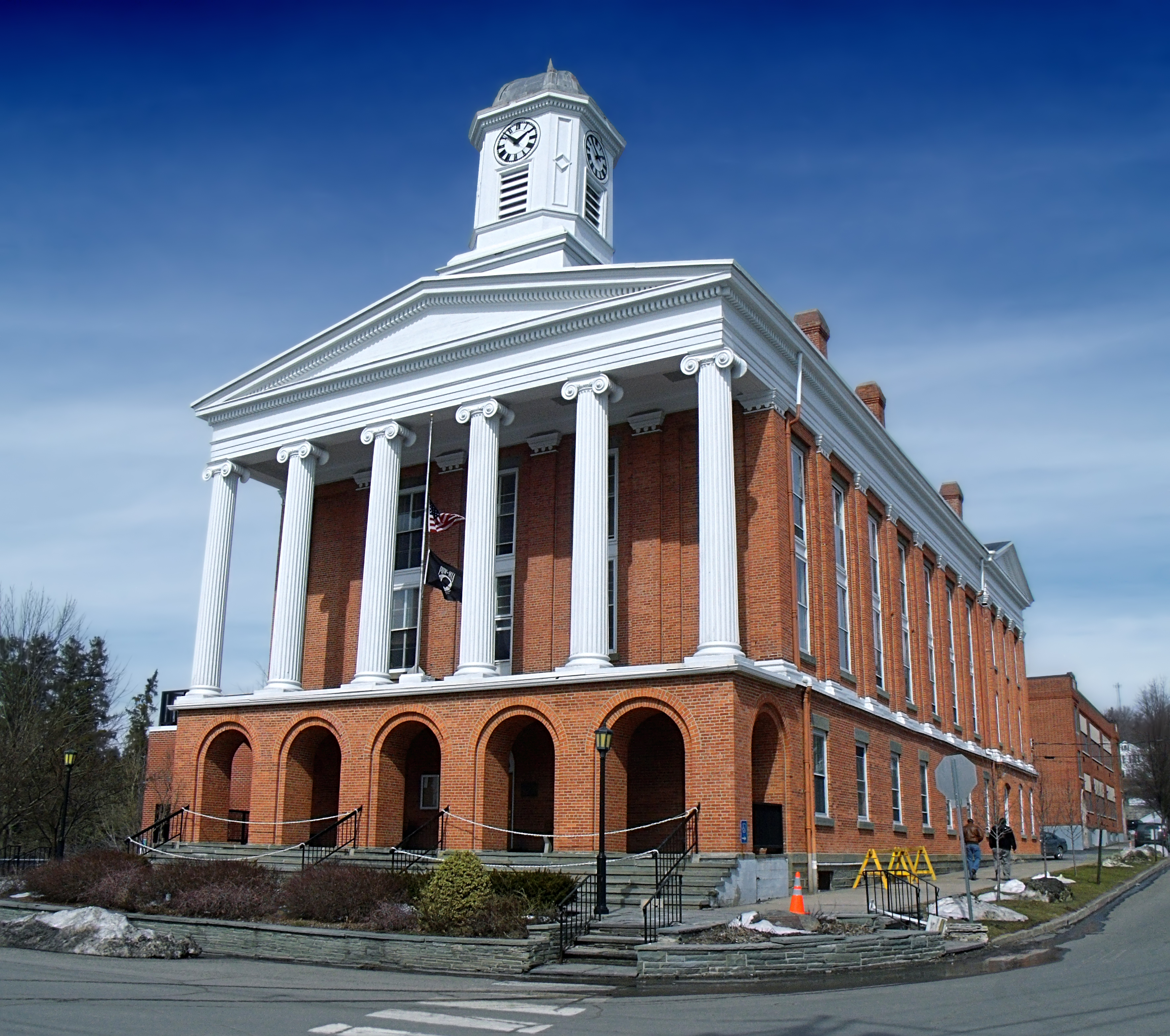
- Susquehanna County Courthouse, March 2011

- Location within Pennsylvania Location within the United States
- Interactive map showing the location of Susquehanna County Courthouse
- Location: Town Green, jct. of Public Ave. and Maple St., Montrose, Pennsylvania
- Coordinates: 41°50′4″N 75°52′35″W
- Area: 10 acres (4.0 ha)
- Built: 1853-1854, 1867-1868
- Built by: Frink, Avery; Boyd, W.H.
- Architectural style: Greek Revival
- NRHP reference No.: 96000706
- Added to NRHP: June 28, 1996

The Susquehanna County Courthouse Complex, also known as the Susquehanna County Courthouse & Jail, is an historic courthouse complex in Montrose, Susquehanna County, Pennsylvania, United States. The complex consists of four contributing buildings, one contributing site (the Town Green), and four contributing objects (an 1887 American Civil War memorial, a 1915 monument to Galusha A. Grow (1822-1903), an early surveyor's marker, and a 1930s Veterans' memorial).

It was added to the National Register of Historic Places in 1996.

== History and architectural features ==
This complex is located on a four-acre plot that was donated to Montrose for public use in 1853. The original section of the courthouse was built in 1854-1855, and is a three bay by seven bay, two-story brick structure in the Greek Revival style. It features a pedimented portico with fluted Ionic order columns and five bay arcade at the first level. It has a shallow gable roof topped by an octagonal cupola. The building has been expanded five times; in 1883, 1902, 1950, 1954, and 1982. The original jail was built in 1853, with a brick addition made in 1973. It is a two-story, rectangular stone structure now known as the Susquehanna County Courthouse Annex. Appended to the Annex is a two-story brick building built in 1925, and originally a part of a now demolished school. The Jail of 1867-1868 is a three-story, stone building measuring 48 feet by 64 feet, and topped by a distinctive cupola. It has a red brick extension with stone trim and flat-topped and rounded windows.

== Gallery ==
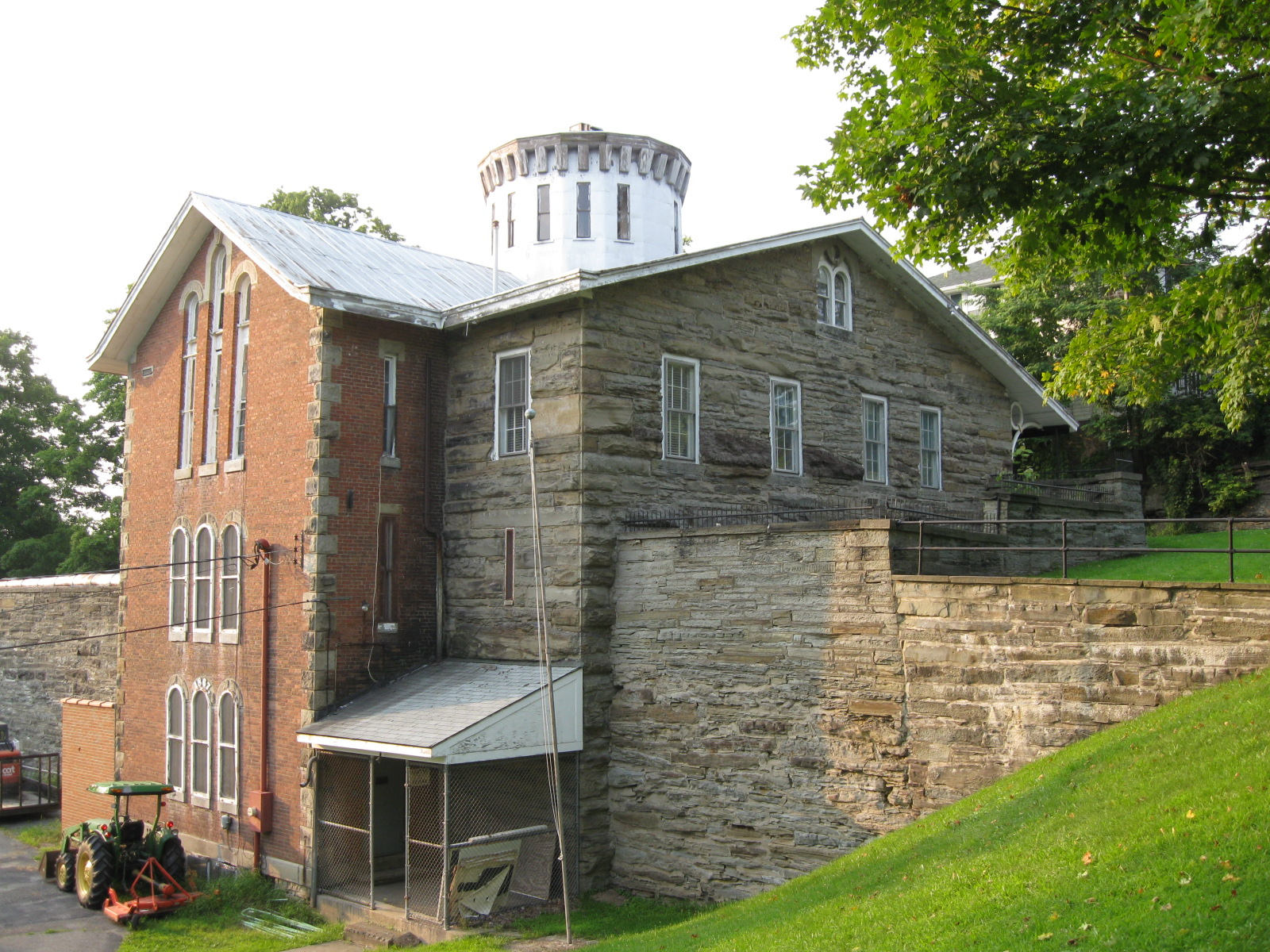
Jail of 1867-1868, August 2009

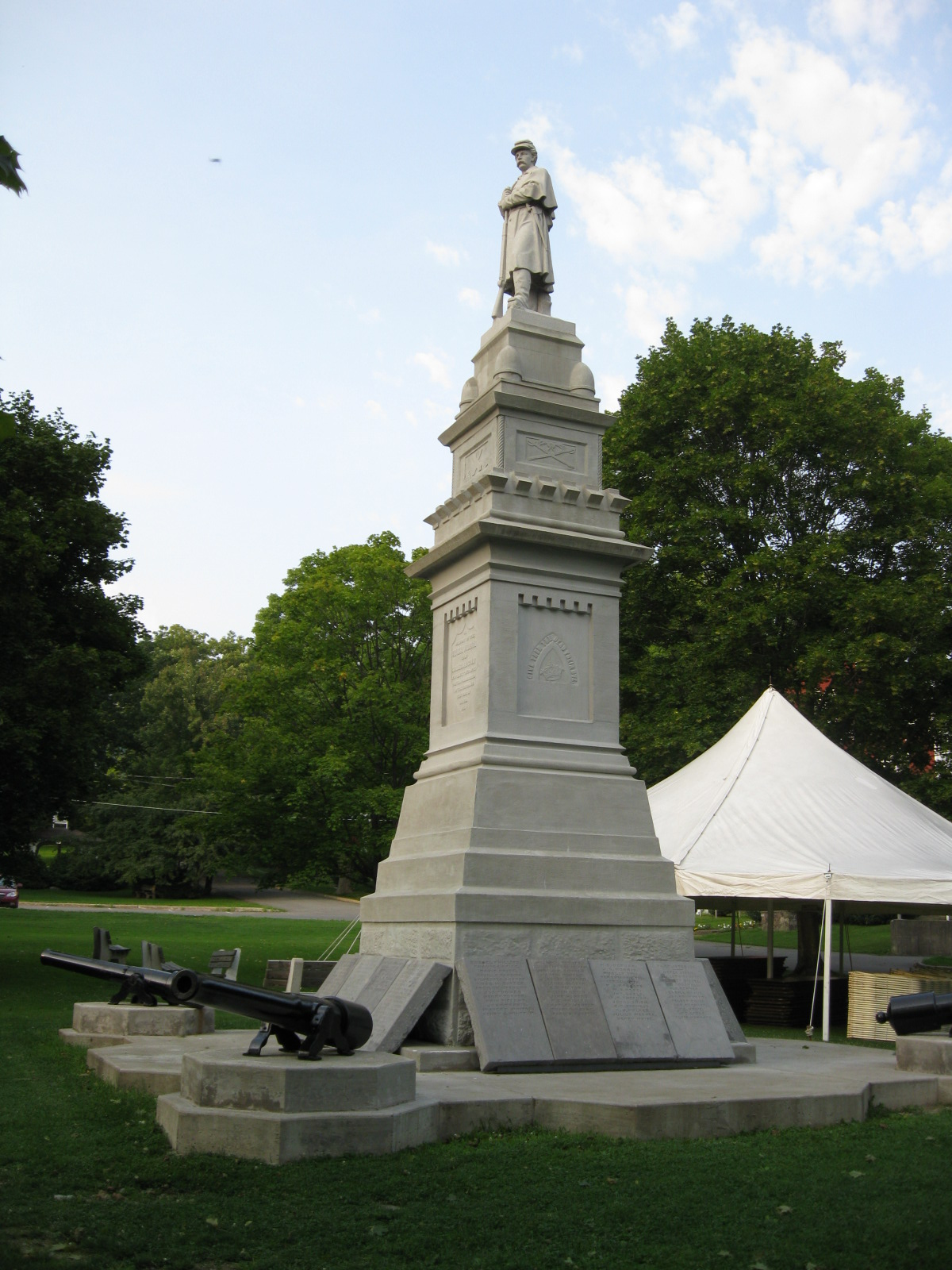
Civil War memorial, August 2009

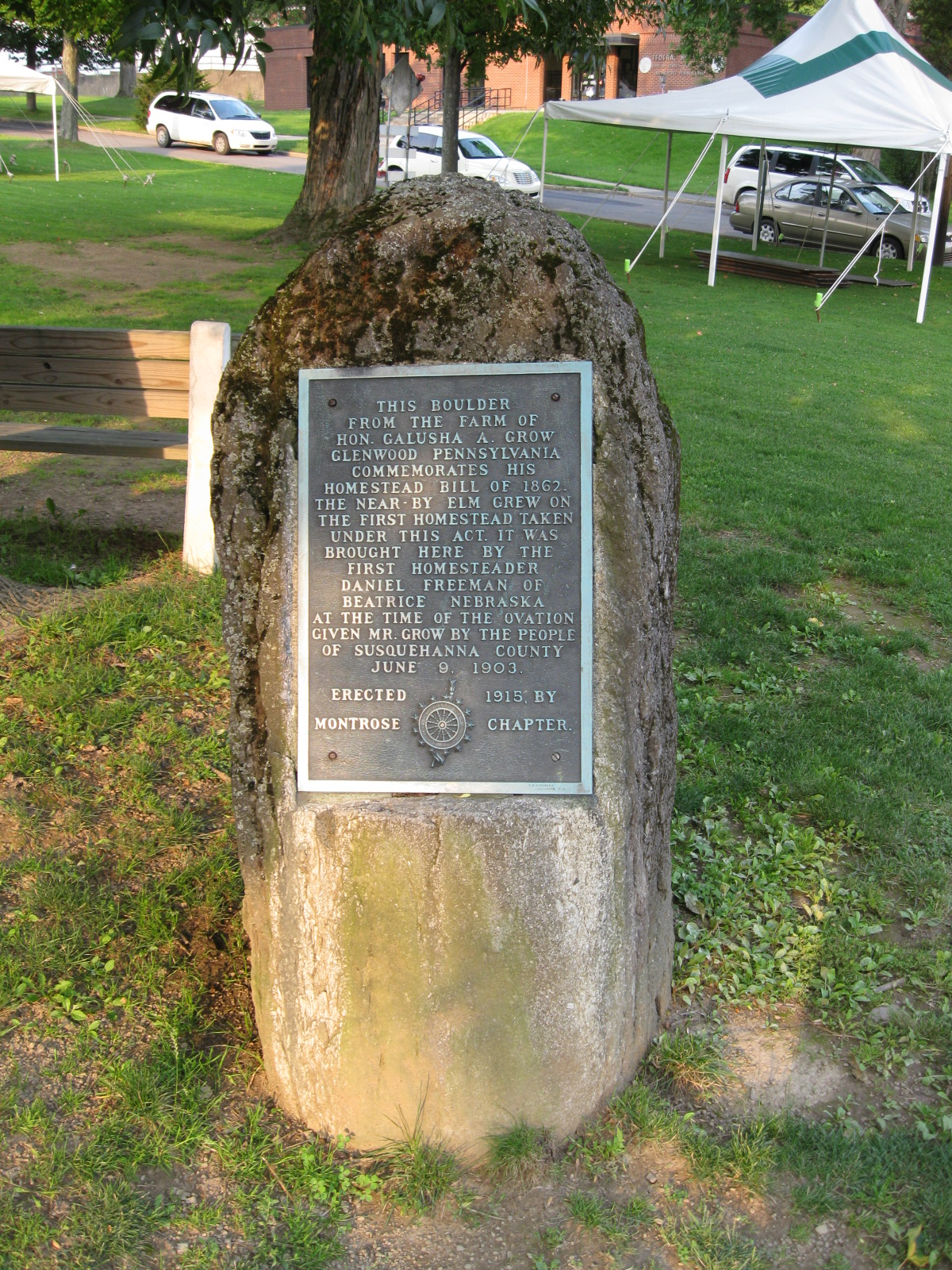
Monument to Galusha A. Grow, August 2009

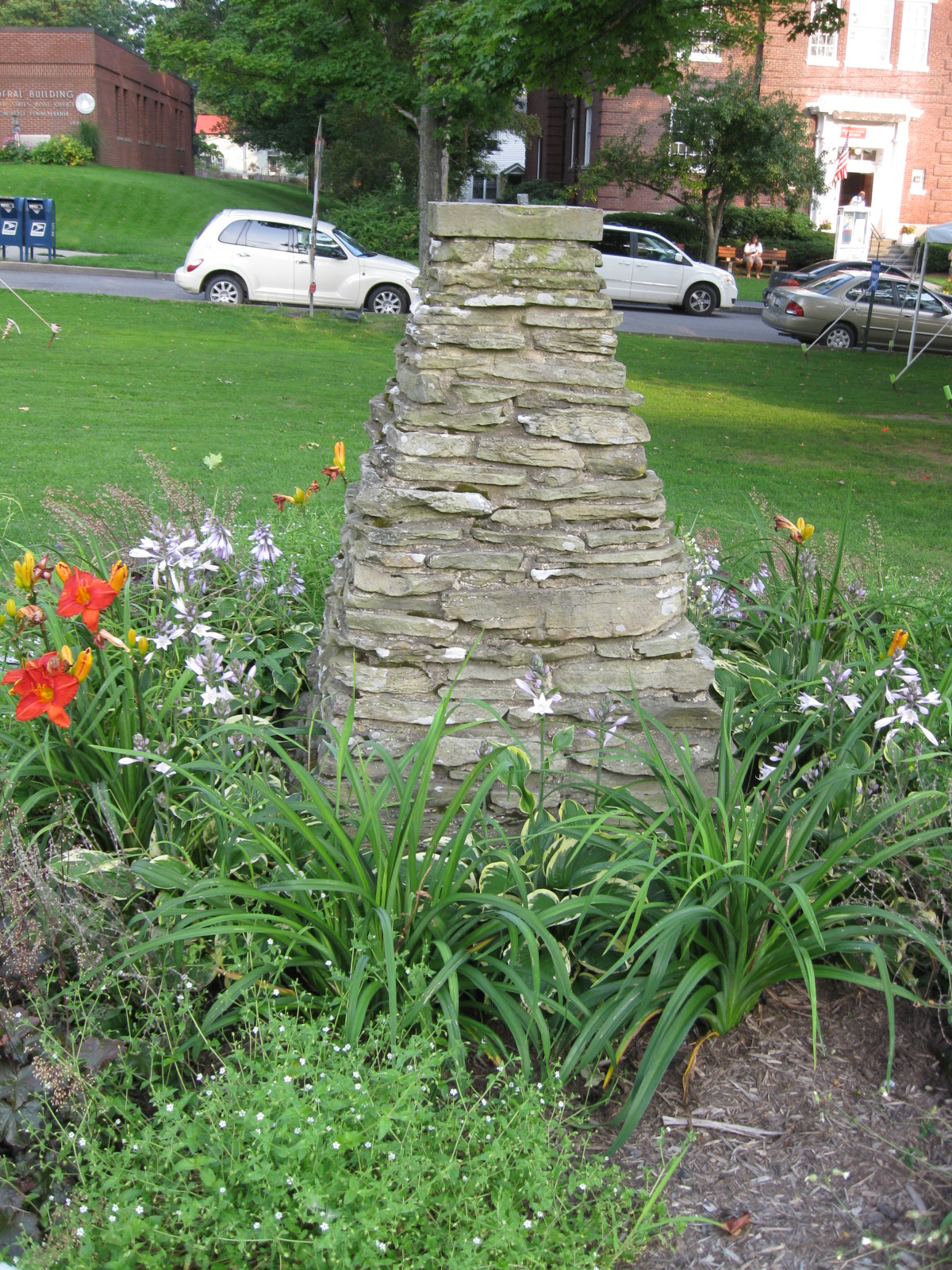
Early surveyor's marker, August 2009

== See also ==
- List of state and county courthouses in Pennsylvania
