= Elisha Mulford =

American religious minister and author (1833–1885)

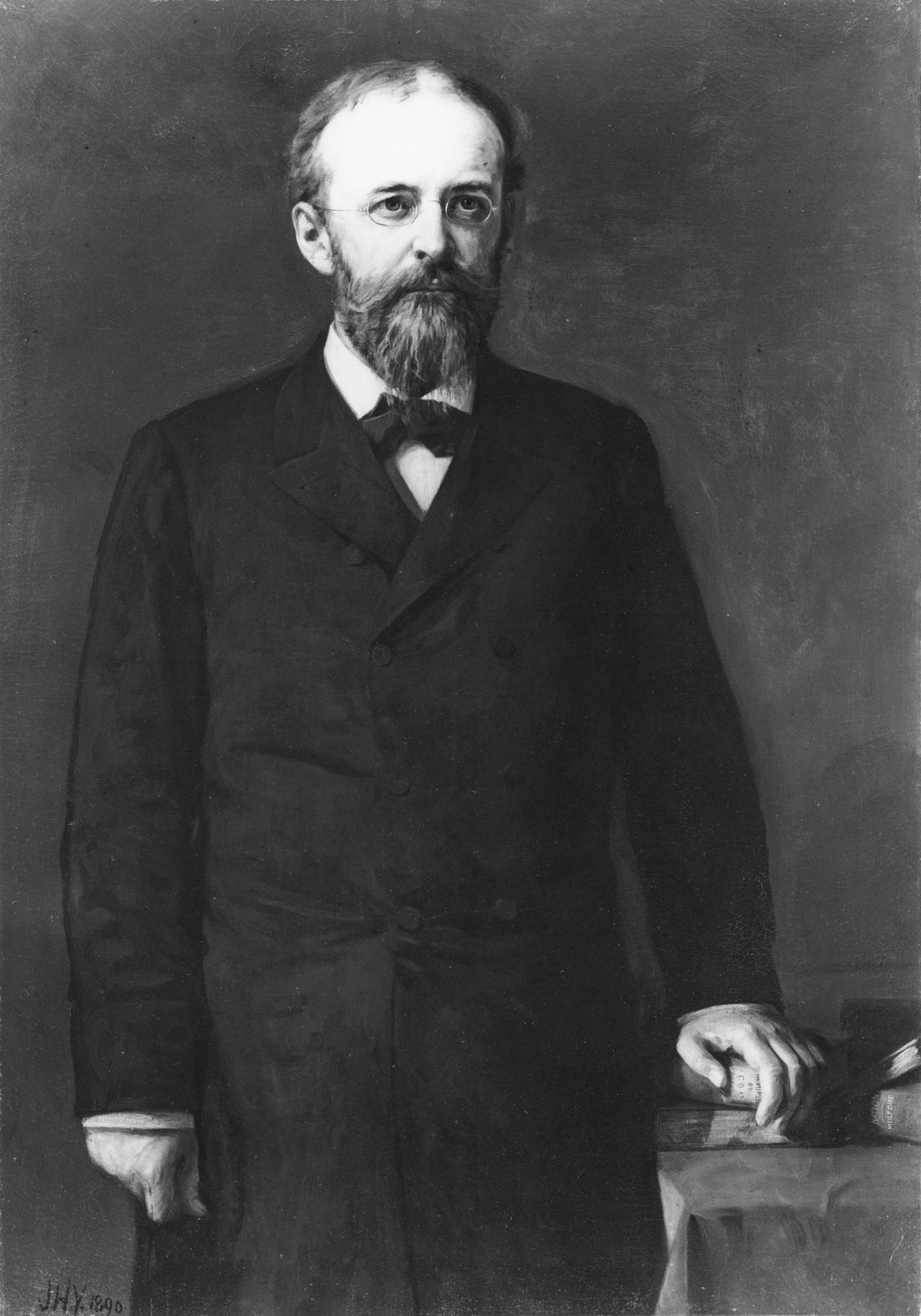
Posthumous portrait of Mulford by James Harvey Young, 1890

Elisha Mulford (November 19, 1833 – December 9, 1885) was an American Christian minister and author of The Nation: the Foundation of Civil Order and Political life in the United States and The Republic of God, an Institute of Theology.

Mulford was born in Montrose, Pa., November 19, 1833 and was raised as a Congregationalist He was prepared for Yale College in Homer, New York, entering at the beginning of the Sophomore year. He graduated in 1855.

For the year after graduation he remained at home, studying law with the Hon. William Jessup and general literature. He then spent a year in the Union Theological Seminary, New York City, whence he removed to the Andover Theological Seminary. He was influenced by the German philosophers, particularly Hegel. He left Andover in January, 1859, and in the following May went abroad. After a year or more, spent mainly in Germany and Italy, he pursued further studies in New York City.

On April 20, 1861, he was ordained a Deacon in the Protestant Episcopal Church by Bishop Williams, at Middletown, Connecticut, and for a few months had temporary charge of a parish in Darien, Conn. On March 19, 1862, he was advanced to the priesthood by Bishop Odenheimer, and in the succeeding autumn became rector of the Church of the Holy Communion in South Orange, N. J. He withdrew from this charge, and from further service as a parish minister, in November, 1864, on account of increasing deafness and for family reasons. He then settled in a secluded country home at Lakeside, near Montrose, Pa., where he devoted himself to reading and study. The first fruit of his retirement was a treatise entitled The Nation, published in 1870 (8°, pp. xiv, 418), which secured him a recognized place among the profound and original minds of his generation. President Woodrow Wilson was an admirer of The Nation. The degree of Doctor of Laws was conferred on him by Yale in 1872.

In 1880 he removed to Cambridge, Mass., chiefly for the sake of educational advantages for his children, and there he published in 1881 his second great work, The Republic of God, an Institute of Theology (8°, pp. viii, 261). He continued to be busy in study, and also found occupation in Cambridge, as lecturer on Apologetics and Theology in the Episcopal Theological School, a duty which he continued to fulfill to the very last.

In the summer of 1885 his health began to fail, and it was discovered that he was suffering from an acute form of Bright's disease. He died, at his home in Cambridge, December 9, 1885, in his 53rd year.

His papers are held at Yale University.

== Family ==
On September 17, 1862, he married Rachel P. Carmalt, of Lakeside, Pa. Rachel survived him, with four of their six children, two daughters and two sons.
