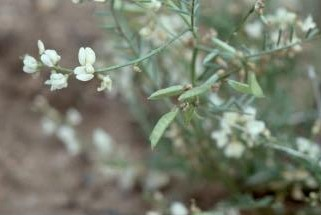

Conservation status
- Imperiled (NatureServe)

Scientific classification
- Kingdom: Plantae
- Clade: Tracheophytes
- Clade: Angiosperms
- Clade: Eudicots
- Clade: Rosids
- Order: Fabales
- Family: Fabaceae
- Subfamily: Faboideae
- Genus: Astragalus
- Species: A. mulfordiae

Binomial name
- Astragalus mulfordiae M.E.Jones

= Astragalus mulfordiae =

Species of legume

Astragalus mulfordiae is a species of flowering plant in the legume family known by the common name Mulford's milkvetch. It was so named after its discoverer Anna Isabel Mulford. It is native to the Snake River Plain in Idaho and Oregon in the United States.

This perennial herb grows up to 25 or 30 centimeters tall with slender stems. The green or yellow-green leaves have several pairs of leaflets that vary in shape, the largest ones about 1.1 centimeters long. The inflorescence is a raceme of up to 20 flowers with white or cream-colored petals which may be striped or tinged purple. The fruit is a legume pod up to 1.6 centimeters long which contains up to 16 seeds.

This plant grows in the dry cold desert of the western Snake River Plain. The habitat is shrubsteppe or desert shrub communities, where it grows alongside Purshia tridentata and Stipa comata. Some populations appear better able to withstand disturbance than others. Some have been extirpated by overgrazing, while others tolerate the presence of cattle. Other threats include fire, off-road vehicle use, and the invasion of Onopordum acanthium, Scotch thistle.
