= Silver Lake Bank =

- U.S. National Register of Historic Places
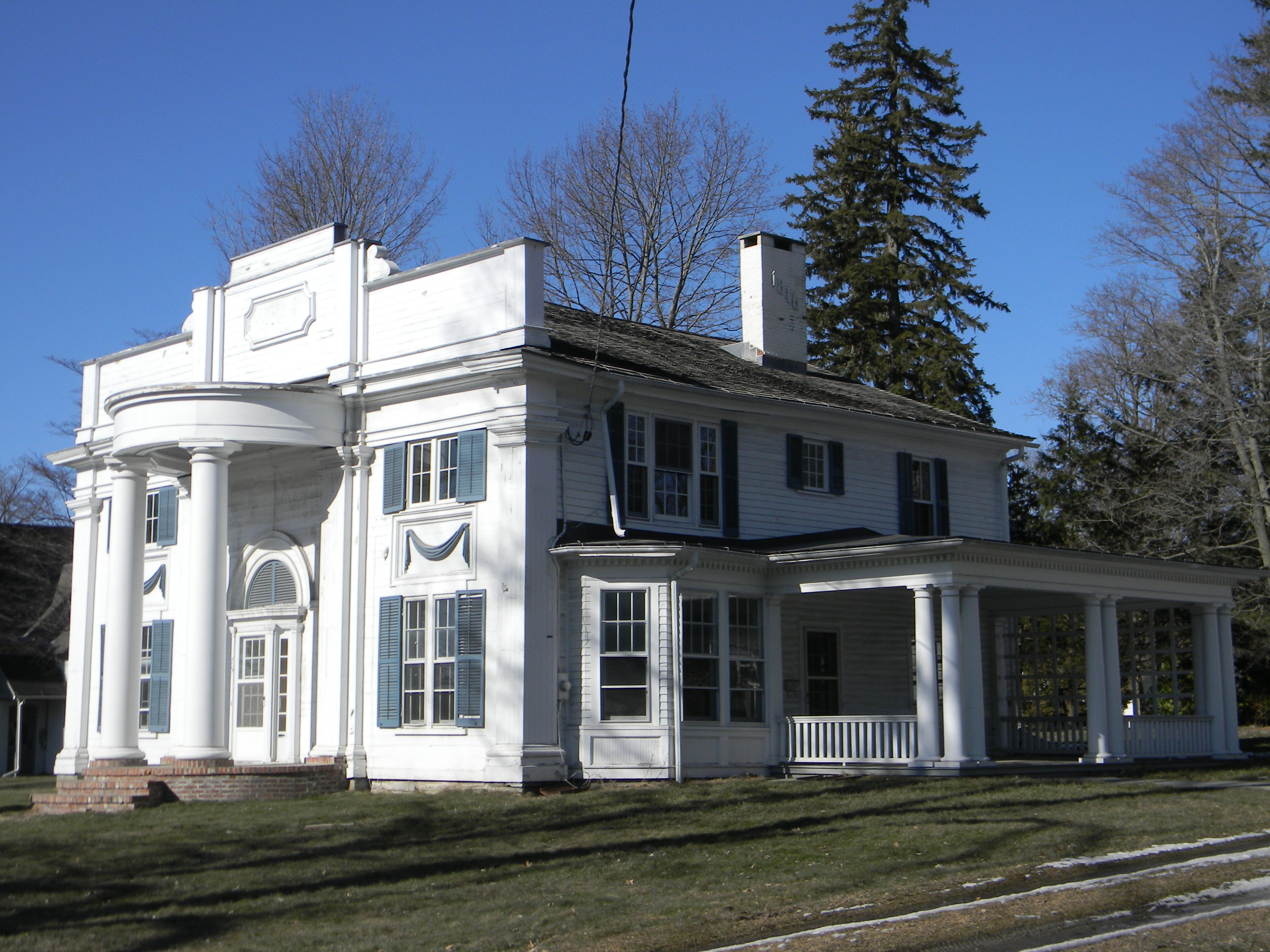
- Silver Lake Bank, February 2012

- Location within Pennsylvania Location within the United States
- Location: 75 Church St., Montrose, Pennsylvania
- Coordinates: 41°49′55″N 75°52′34″W
- Area: 1 acre (0.40 ha)
- Built: 1816
- Architectural style: Greek Revival
- NRHP reference No.: 75001666
- Added to NRHP: March 07, 1975

The Silver Lake Bank in Montrose, Pennsylvania is a building from 1816. It is now used as the headquarters for the Center for Anti-Slavery Studies nonprofit organization.

It was listed on the National Register of Historic Places in 1975.
