= William Jessup =

American judge

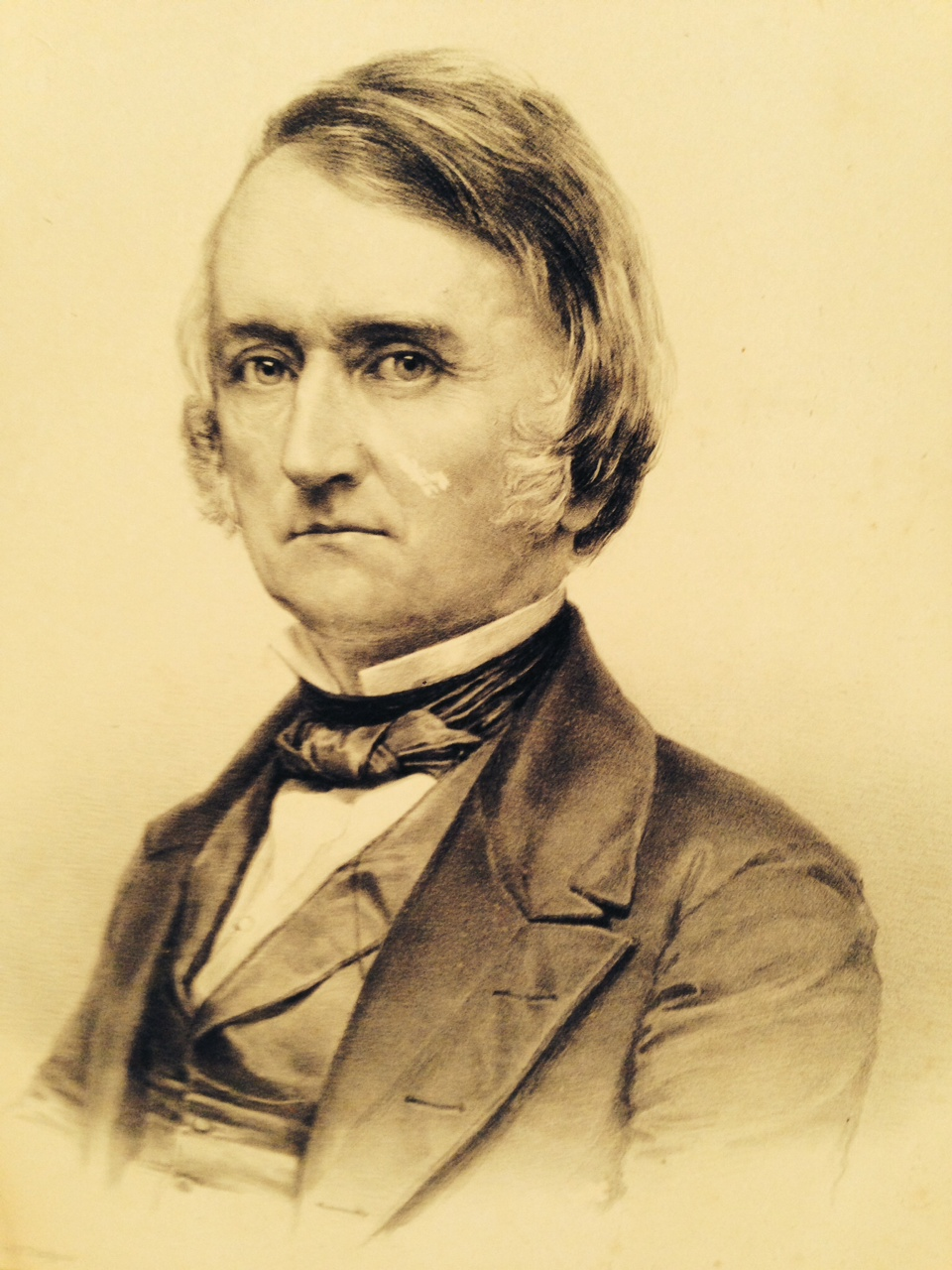
- Born: June 21, 1797; Southampton, New York
- Died: September 11, 1868 (aged 71); Montrose, Pennsylvania
- Occupation: Judge
- Known for: 1860 Republican party platform

William Jessup (June 21, 1797 – September 11, 1868) was a Pennsylvania judge and father of the missionary Henry Harris Jessup. A member of the Republican party, he is best known for being the chairman of the platform committee that crafted and reported the political platform adopted by the 1860 Republican National Convention and accepted by Abraham Lincoln, the party's nominee. Jessup, Pennsylvania is named in his honor.

== Biography ==
William Jessup left his native home, Long Island, in early adulthood to study at Yale College, graduating in 1815. He moved in 1818 to Montrose, Pennsylvania, and made it his lifelong home. He read law with an established firm and was admitted to the bar.

He married and fathered two sons, Henry Harris and Samuel Jessup, born in 1832 and 1833. In 1838 Jessup became the presiding judge of the Eleventh Judicial District of Pennsylvania, in which capacity he rode circuit from 1838 until 1851. In 1858, Jessup was the Vice President of the American Board of Commissioners for Foreign Missions.

A staunch abolitionist, Jessup was named as one of the Pennsylvania delegates to the 1860 Republican National Convention in Chicago. Upon arrival, he was selected to chair the platform committee to write the party's statement of political principles. The platform adopted by Jessup's committee was approved by the convention by a unanimous vote. In November 1860, the Republican ticket of Abraham Lincoln and Hannibal Hamlin was elected to lead the new national administration, and soon thereafter, the Civil War broke out.

In 1861, the Commonwealth of Pennsylvania appointed Jessup to serve as a liaison with the White House, naming him as their emissary to a high-level conference in early 1861 on how to implement Lincoln's call for the enlistment of 75,000 members of the Northern state militias into the new Federal army. Liaison work like this led to Pennsylvania over-fulfilling its quota and the creation of the Pennsylvania Reserves. The retired judge died in September 1868, having seen the abolition of slavery and granting of citizenship to freedmen.

William Jessup is the 3x great-grandfather of American television writer Ted Jessup.
