= Anna Isabel Mulford =

American botanist (c.1848–1943)

Anna Isabel Mulford (c. 1848 – June 16, 1943) was an American botanist and teacher.

== Education ==
Mulford was born in East Orange, New Jersey, and graduated Vassar College with an A.B., A.M. in 1886. In St. Louis, Missouri, she enrolled in the Shaw School of Botany at Washington University and in 1895, she was the first student to earn a Ph.D. (a faculty member had done so three years before). Mulford's doctoral dissertation described her research on agave plants in the U.S. In the course of her studies, she discovered several new species and, subsequently, some of them were named after her.

Over 300 specimen records collected by Mulford have been digitized and incorporated into the Garden’s Tropicos database. In 1892, Mulford embarked on a botanical expedition along the Oregon Trail, venturing into Oregon and Idaho. Throughout her journey, she meticulously gathered over 1,100 plant specimens. In an article for the Botanical Gazette, Mulford vividly described Idaho as a convergence point for diverse floras, encompassing sub-arctic plants from the north, traces of Siberian vegetation, as well as the presence of cacti and other southern flora. The landscape varied from vast desert flora to lush thickets and meadows teeming with vegetation. It was during this expedition that Mulford discovered Mulford’s milkvetch in Boise.

In the summer of 1895, Mulford undertook another collecting expedition, this time in Texas and New Mexico, while concurrently working on her doctoral thesis. Her doctoral research focused on advancing the understanding of agaves, resulting in her dissertation titled "A Study of the Agave of the United States," which was published in the Garden’s Annual Report in 1896.

Despite her significant contributions to botanical science, little is known about Dr. Mulford's personal and professional life beyond her time in St. Louis. Records indicate that she returned to her hometown of East Orange, New Jersey, by 1930. She lived until 1943, dying at the age of 95.

== Career ==
Mulford discovered Astragalus mulfordiae, a member of the bean family, which was named in her honor as Mulford's milkvetch.

Her teaching career included both McKinley High School (1898) and St. Louis High School.

== Written works ==
- The Agaves of the United States - Mulford's doctoral dissertation, published by the Missouri Botanical Garden in 1896
