= Husky Haven Airport =

- IATA: none; ICAO: none; FAA LID: P32

Summary
- Airport type: Public
- Owner/Operator: Dalton Air
- Serves: Susquehanna County, Pennsylvania
- Location: Montrose, Pennsylvania
- Time zone: Eastern (UTC−05:00)
  - Summer (DST): EDT (UTC−04:00)
- Elevation AMSL: 1,670 ft (510 m)
- Coordinates: 41°47′20″N 075°53′24″W

Map
- Location in Pennsylvania

Runways
Direction	Length		Surface
Direction	ft	m	Surface
10/28	1,900	579	Turf

Statistics (2013-2014)
- Operations: 2,250
- Source: Federal Aviation Administration

Husky Haven Airport (FAA LID: P32) is a small airport located in Montrose, Pennsylvania. The airport serves Susquehanna County, Pennsylvania as a general aviation airport. The airport's single runway is 1,900 ft × 100 ft (579 m × 30 m). The airport was commissioned in July 1969.
