= Frederick Mulford =

British agent and football promoter in Nigeria (1881–1949)

Frederick Baron Mulford (1881–1949) was a British expatriate who contributed to the development of football in Nigeria.

== Life ==
Mulford came to Nigeria c.1906 as an agent of Lagos Stores, and between 1906 and 1908, he played football with European expatriates and Nigerians on the fields of Lagos Race Course. His work then carried him across the country and when he returned to Lagos in 1914, football had begun to develop at the high school level. King's College played some matches with European teams that at times had Bertie Denyer as a player. Mulford also began to coordinate more matches among Europeans and also between Africans and Europeans. The matches between King's College and selected European teams gradually became popular in Lagos and by 1918, King's College and the expatriate led Lagos Merchants which had Mulford as a player were the major teams in Lagos. During a series of charity matches to raise money for the British Red Cross, Mulford donated the competition's trophy. The event later became an annual competition called the Lagos War Memorial Cup, in 1949 when Mulford died it was named after him until it became Oba Cup in the 1960s.

In the 1920s, Mulford was a player and patron of the Lagos Diamond Football Club, among members of the club was Azikiwe. The club joined the Lagos League in 1930 and Mulford served as vice-president of the Lagos and District Amateur Football Association. He was at various times the games master and football coach of King's College, Igbobi College and St. Gregory's.

== Sources ==
- Boer, Wiebe Karl (2003). Nation building exercise: Sporting culture and the rise of football in colonial Nigeria (Thesis). Yale University.
