= Franklin Township, Susquehanna County, Pennsylvania =

Township in Pennsylvania, United States

- Township
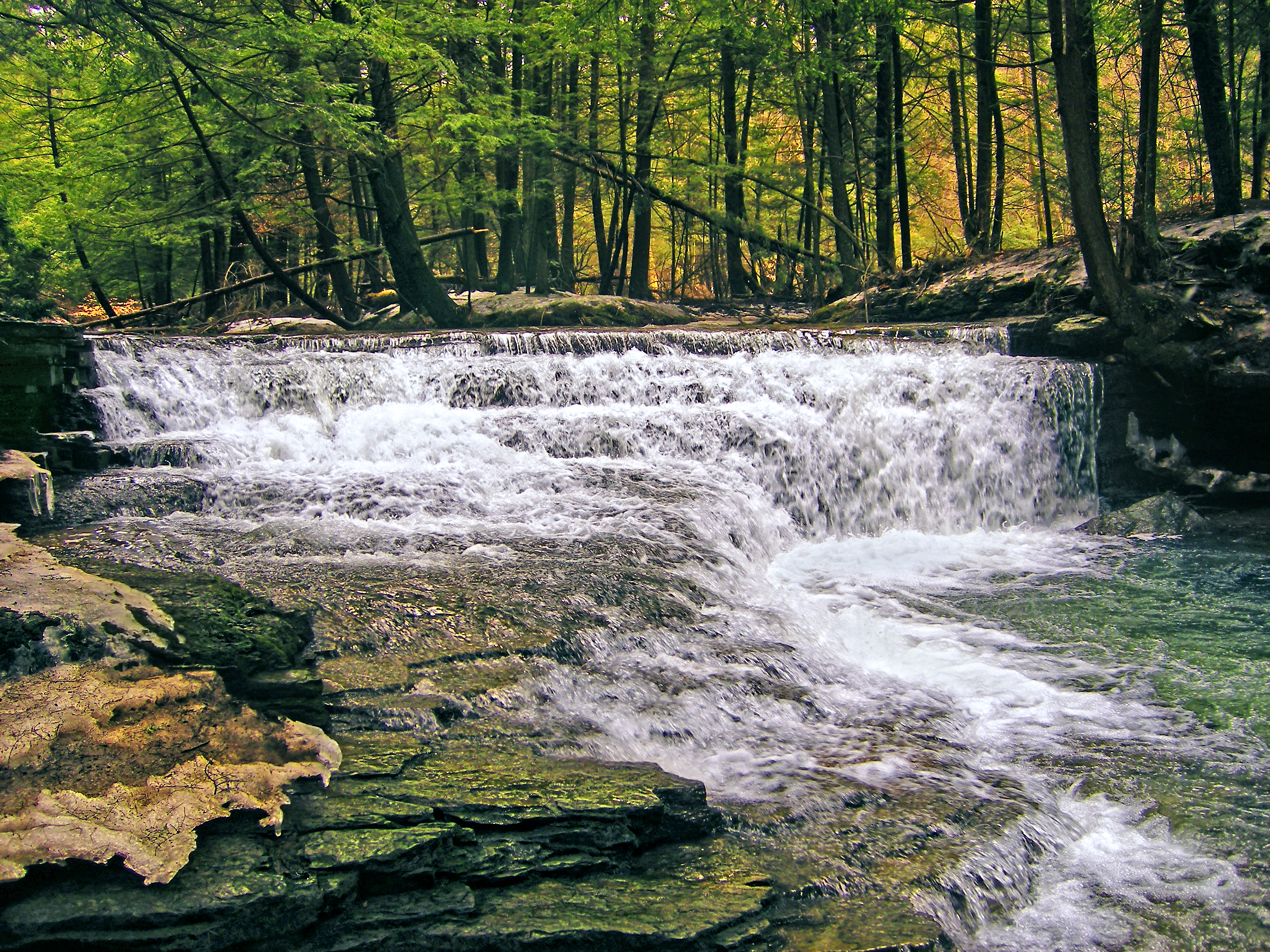
- Waterfall at Salt Springs State Park

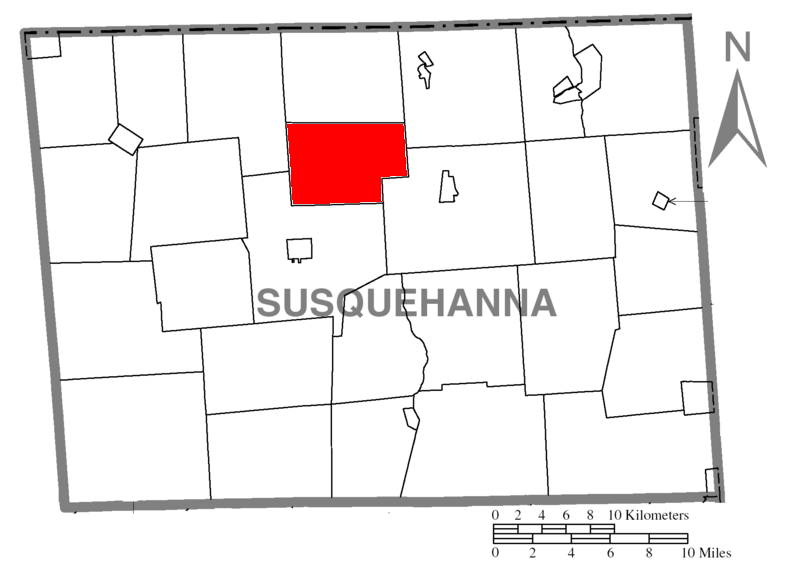

- Location of Pennsylvania in the United States
- Coordinates: 41°52′29″N 75°49′59″W
- Country: United States
- State: Pennsylvania
- County: Susquehanna
- Settled: 1797
- Incorporated: 1835

Area
  - Total: 23.81 sq mi (61.66 km^{2})
  - Land: 23.69 sq mi (61.36 km^{2})
  - Water: 0.12 sq mi (0.30 km^{2})

Population (2020)
  - Total: 833 ▼
  - Estimate (2021): 834
  - Density: 37.3/sq mi (14.39/km^{2})
- Time zone: UTC-5 (EST)
  - Summer (DST): UTC-4 (EDT)
- Area code: 570
- FIPS code: 42-115-27448
- Website: franklintwp.info

Franklin Township is a township in Susquehanna County, Pennsylvania, United States. The population was 833 at the 2020 census. Salt Springs State Park, a Pennsylvania state park, is in Franklin Township.

== History ==
Franklin Township was formed from the southern part of Lawsville Township and northern section of Bridgewater Township in May 1835.

== Geography ==
According to the United States Census Bureau, the township has a total area of 23.8 square miles (62 km^{2}), of which 23.7 square miles (61 km^{2}) is land and 0.1 square miles (0.26 km^{2}) (0.42%) is water.

== Demographics ==
Historical population
Census	Pop.	Note	%±
2010	937		—
2020	833		−11.1%
2021 (est.)	834		0.1%
U.S. Decennial Census

=== 2000 census ===
At the 2000 census there were 938 people, 362 households, and 274 families living in the township. The population density was 39.4 people per square mile (15.2 people/km^{2}). There were 484 housing units at an average density of 20.3 per square mile (7.8/km^{2}). The racial makeup of the township was 98.72% White, 0.21% African American, 0.21% Asian, 0.32% from other races, and 0.53% from two or more races. Hispanic or Latino of any race were 0.43%.

Of the 362 households 30.4% had children under the age of 18 living with them, 61.6% were married couples living together, 9.4% had a female householder with no husband present, and 24.3% were non-families. 18.5% of households were one person and 8.8% were one person aged 65 or older. The average household size was 2.59 and the average family size was 2.95.

The age distribution was 24.8% under the age of 18, 6.4% from 18 to 24, 27.2% from 25 to 44, 27.2% from 45 to 64, and 14.4% 65 or older. The median age was 40 years. For every 100 females there were 93.8 males. For every 100 females age 18 and over, there were 92.6 males.

The median household income was $33,125 and the median family income was $34,167. Males had a median income of $26,776 versus $21,875 for females. The per capita income for the township was $14,866. About 6.4% of families and 9.3% of the population were below the poverty line, including 13.9% of those under age 18 and 2.9% of those age 65 or over.

=== 2010 census ===
At the 2010 census there were 937 people, 371 households, and 286 families living in the township. The population density was 39.5 people per square mile (15.3 people/km^{2}). There were 488 housing units at an average density of 20.6 per square mile (8.0/km^{2}). The racial makeup of the township was 99.9% White, 0.1% African American. Hispanic or Latino of any race were 1.7%.

Of the 371 households 28% had children under the age of 18 living with them, 61.5% were married couples living together, 8.9% had a female householder with no husband present, and 22.9% were non-families. 20.2% of households were one person and 8.4% were one person aged 65 or older. The average household size was 2.53 and the average family size was 2.84.

The age distribution was 20.8% under the age of 18, 60.5% from 18 to 64, and 18.7% 65 or older. The median age was 47.3 years.

The median household income was $45,833 and the median family income was $52,708. Males had a median income of $39,583 versus $25,625 for females. The per capita income for the township was $19,069. About 6.7% of families and 9% of the population were below the poverty line, including 7.3% of those under age 18 and 8.6% of those age 65 or over.
