= Montrose, Pennsylvania =

Borough in Pennsylvania, US

- Borough
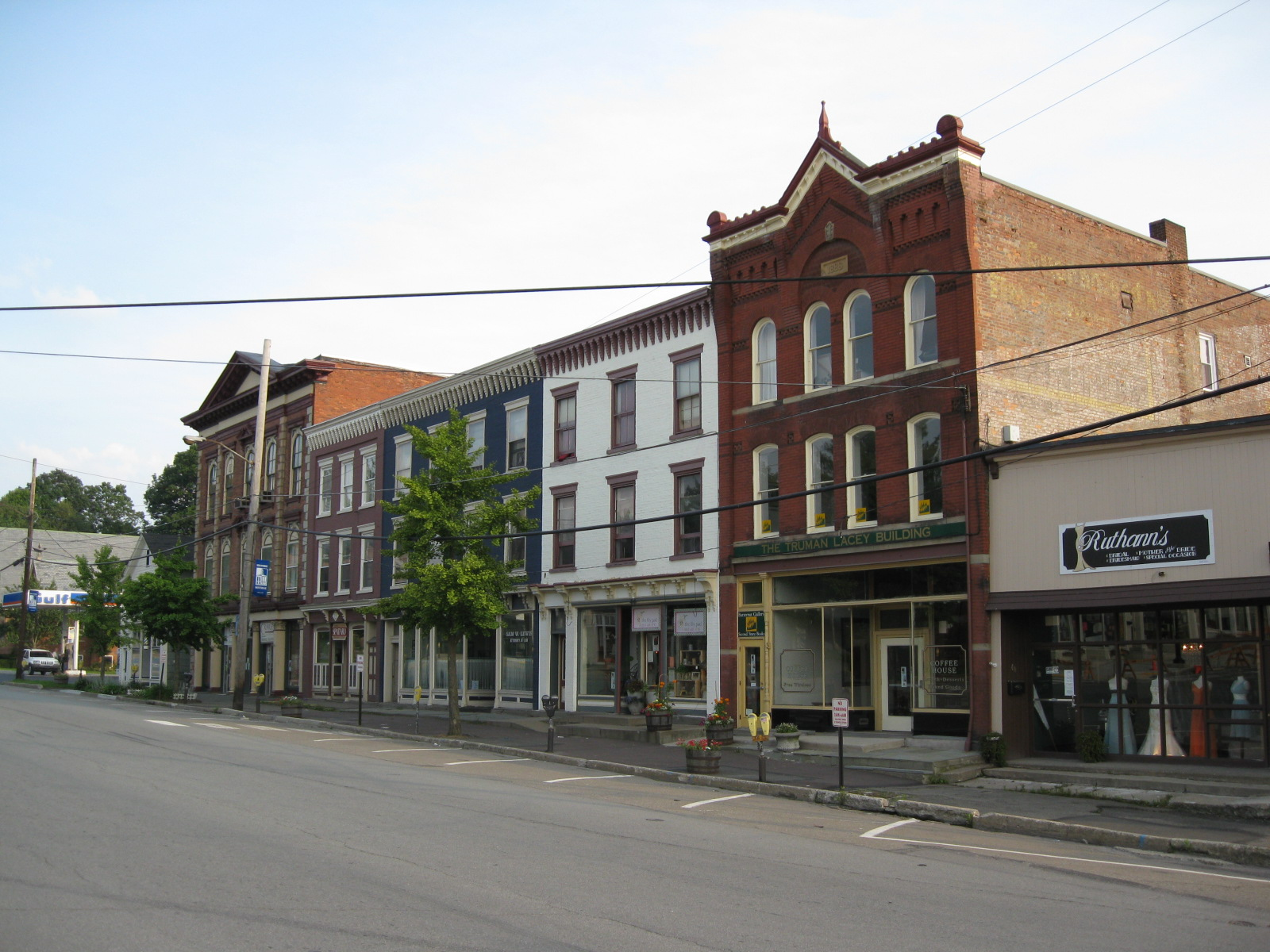
- Downtown Montrose, Pennsylvania
- Nickname: Quarry Town
- Location of Montrose in Susquehanna County, Pennsylvania.

- Location in Pennsylvania Montrose (the United States)
- Coordinates: 41°49′59″N 75°52′38″W
- Country: United States
- State: Pennsylvania
- County: Susquehanna
- Settled: 1812
- Incorporated: 1824

Government
  - Type: Borough Council
  - Mayor: Tom LaMont

Area
  - Total: 1.29 sq mi (3.33 km^{2})
  - Land: 1.29 sq mi (3.33 km^{2})
  - Water: 0 sq mi (0.00 km^{2})
- Elevation: 1,657 ft (505 m)

Population (2020)
  - Total: 1,290
  - Density: 1,002.4/sq mi (387.03/km^{2})
- Time zone: UTC-5 (Eastern (EST))
  - Summer (DST): UTC-4 (EDT)
- ZIP code: 18801
- Area code: 570
- FIPS code: 42-50736
- GNIS feature ID: 1215614
- Website: https://www.montroseborough.com/

Montrose, Pennsylvania, as depicted on an 1890 panoramic map.

Montrose is a borough in and the county seat of Susquehanna County, Pennsylvania, United States. As of the 2020 census, Montrose had a population of 1,290. The land is elevated approximately 1,400 feet (430 m) above sea level.

== History ==
Montrose was laid out in 1812 in an area of Pennsylvania historically associated with the Indigenous Susquehannock people. The first non-Indigenous settler in 1800 was a Revolutionary War officer, Captain Bartlett Hinds, who traveled from Long Island, NY with his stepson, Isaac Post. Upon seeing the area's natural beauty and potential, he returned to NY to bring his family to Pennsylvania. Among other settlers were the descendants of Sir Peter Warren, Knight Vice Admiral on England's Royal Fleet. Upon retirement, he was given the land by grateful American soldiers.

The first courthouse was built a year later, and Montrose was incorporated as a borough from part of Bridgewater Township on March 29, 1824. Prominent area citizens Capt. B. Hinds and Dr. Robert H. Rose collaborated to name Montrose after a town in Scotland.

The traditional older industries included creameries and the manufacturing of cut glass, boxes, sawing machinery, lumber, etc. The area of Montrose is notable for its many quarry sites. A type of rock that is indigenous to this area is called blue stone. In 1900, 1,827 people lived there, and in 1910, 1,914 people resided there.

Montrose was incorporated as a town and seat of Susquehanna County in 1824, but families began immigrating to the area in the mid-18th century, primarily from areas along the Connecticut River Valley (western Connecticut, Massachusetts, and Vermont). The American Revolution dramatically changed the political and built environments of New England. After the war, there was pent-up land hunger and many residents wanted some of the affordable land in Pennsylvania. When settlers arrived in what is now Susquehanna County they found rolling hills, clear lakes, and mountain streams with an abundance of natural resources such as timber and bluestone. In a very short period of time, the first families built Montrose in the style of their home New England towns: large colonial style houses surrounding churches, and both centered on a main street. A town “green” adjacent to the courthouse was the commons, or place for community events.

Montrose played a significant role in the Northern Trail of the Underground Railroad: "During the 1840s, the anti-slavery ideology prevailing in Susquehanna County took a decidedly radical turn. Abolitionists no longer content to limit their involvement to lectures and debates began helping slaves escape on the Underground Railroad. Of the eighty-two individuals identified as Underground Railroad agents, twenty-one came from Susquehanna County."

Between the 1950s and 1990s, due to the declines in the coal industry and agriculture, residents emigrated from this area to other places for work. In the latter part of the first decade of the 21st century natural gas exploration, drilling and hydraulic fracturing used in the gas extraction process have created a dramatic pickup in the local economy. Due to increased revenues in town, the Montrose hospital (the only major hospital in Susquehanna County) was moved from an old and small facility downtown to a large, advanced facility just outside town.

The population was 1,290 at the 2020 United States census; 1,664 at the 2000 census, and 1,617 as of 2010.

The town's Sylvanus Mulford House, Silver Lake Bank, and Susquehanna County Courthouse Complex are listed on the National Register of Historic Places. The Montrose Historic District was added in 2011.

== Geography ==
Montrose is located at 41°49′59″N 75°52′38″W (41.833064, -75.877190).

According to the United States Census Bureau, the borough has a total area of 1.3 square miles (3.4 km^{2}), all land.

=== Climate ===
Climate data for Montrose, Pennsylvania (1991–2020)
Month	Jan	Feb	Mar	Apr	May	Jun	Jul	Aug	Sep	Oct	Nov	Dec	Year
Mean daily maximum °F (°C)	31.1 (−0.5)	33.2 (0.7)	41.2 (5.1)	54.9 (12.7)	67.1 (19.5)	74.8 (23.8)	79.7 (26.5)	78.6 (25.9)	71.2 (21.8)	59.0 (15.0)	46.6 (8.1)	35.6 (2.0)	56.1 (13.4)
Daily mean °F (°C)	21.8 (−5.7)	23.0 (−5.0)	31.1 (−0.5)	43.2 (6.2)	54.7 (12.6)	63.5 (17.5)	67.7 (19.8)	66.5 (19.2)	58.9 (14.9)	47.6 (8.7)	37.0 (2.8)	27.4 (−2.6)	45.2 (7.3)
Mean daily minimum °F (°C)	12.5 (−10.8)	12.7 (−10.7)	20.9 (−6.2)	31.5 (−0.3)	42.4 (5.8)	52.3 (11.3)	55.7 (13.2)	54.4 (12.4)	46.5 (8.1)	36.2 (2.3)	27.3 (−2.6)	19.2 (−7.1)	34.3 (1.3)
Average precipitation inches (mm)	3.37 (86)	2.83 (72)	3.57 (91)	4.07 (103)	4.26 (108)	4.64 (118)	4.64 (118)	3.80 (97)	4.53 (115)	4.10 (104)	3.32 (84)	3.58 (91)	46.71 (1,187)
Average snowfall inches (cm)	20.6 (52)	15.9 (40)	18.6 (47)	4.5 (11)	0.2 (0.51)	0.0 (0.0)	0.0 (0.0)	0.0 (0.0)	0.0 (0.0)	0.5 (1.3)	7.5 (19)	14.9 (38)	82.7 (208.81)
Source: NOAA

== Demographics ==
Historical population
Census	Pop.	Note	%±
1830	415		—
1840	632		52.3%
1850	917		45.1%
1860	1,168		27.4%
1870	1,463		25.3%
1880	1,722		17.7%
1890	1,735		0.8%
1900	1,827		5.3%
1910	1,914		4.8%
1920	1,661		−13.2%
1930	1,909		14.9%
1940	1,977		3.6%
1950	2,075		5.0%
1960	2,363		13.9%
1970	2,058		−12.9%
1980	1,980		−3.8%
1990	1,982		0.1%
2000	1,664		−16.0%
2010	1,617		−2.8%
2020	1,290		−20.2%
2021 (est.)	1,293	▲	0.2%

As of the census of 2010, there were 1,617 people, 754 households, and 399 families residing in the borough. The population density was 1,243.8 people per square mile (480.2 people/km^{2}). There were 857 housing units at an average density of 659.2 per square mile (254.5/km^{2}). The racial makeup of the borough was 98.8% White, 0.2% African American, 0.05% American Indian and Alaska Native (U.S. Census)|American Indian, 0.05% Asian, 0.2% from other races, and 0.7% from two or more races. Hispanic or Latino of any race were 1.1% of the population.

There were 754 households, out of which 23.1% had children under the age of 18 living with them, 39.3% were married couples living together, 10.2% had a female householder with no husband present, and 47.1% were non-families. 42.3% of all households were made up of individuals, and 21.2% had someone living alone who was 65 years of age or older. The average household size was 2.14 and the average family size was 2.97.

In the borough the population was spread out, with 21.5% under the age of 18, 56.8% from 18 to 64, and 21.7% who were 65 years of age or older. The median age was 44.4 years.

The median income for a household in the borough was $37,125, and the median income for a family was $48,867. Males had a median income of $33,077 versus $26,174 for females. The per capita income for the borough was $19,255. About 12.5% of families and 15.5% of the population were below the poverty line, including 20.2% of those under age 18 and 10.3% of those age 65 or over.

== Transportation ==
Three Pennsylvania state highways meet in Montrose: Route 29, Route 167, and Route 706. The major highway in the area, Interstate 81, is located 10 miles to the east, and may be reached via Route 706. Montrose is also linked by road to Friendsville, Little Meadows, and South Montrose. Husky Haven Airport is located about three miles south of Montrose; it is used only for general aviation. The closest airports with commercial service are Greater Binghamton Airport, 30 miles to the north, and Wilkes-Barre/Scranton International Airport, around 60 miles to the south.

Montrose was also served by three rail operations: two railroads (the Lehigh Valley Railroad and the Lackawanna Railroad), as well as one trolley line (the Northern Electric). All three have been abandoned.

== Media ==
WPEL AM 800 and 96.5 FM have served the region for more than sixty years from studios at 251 High Street.

== Notable people ==
- Emily C. Blackman (1826–1907), historian and schoolteacher
- Charles Martin Crandall (1833–1905), toymaker
- William Jessup (1797–1868), judge and abolitionist
- Edith May (1827–1903), pseudonym of American poet Anne Drinker
- J. Brewster McCollum (1832–1903), Chief Justice of the Supreme Court of Pennsylvania
- Elisha Mulford (1833–1885), religious minister and author
- Jessie Isabelle Price (1930 – 2015), an African American veterinary microbiologist
- Chris Snee (born 1982), former offensive guard and two-time Super bowl Champion for New York Giants
- Rich Thompson (born 1979), baseball player for the Tampa Bay Rays
- Jonathan Jasper Wright (1840–1885), lived in Montrose as a youth and became the first African American to pass the Pennsylvania bar, went South with the American Missionary Association after the Civil War and served as head of the Freedmen's Bureau, and was elected associate justice of the South Carolina Supreme Court
