= Lees Creek (Lackawanna River tributary) =

Lees Creek Shove Creek

Physical characteristics
- Source
  - location: wetland on a plateau in Carbondale Township, Lackawanna County, Pennsylvania
  - elevation: between 1,760 and 1,780 feet (536 and 543 m)
- Mouth
  - location: Lackawanna River in Carbondale Township, Lackawanna County, Pennsylvania
  - coordinates: 41°32′59″N 75°31′44″W
  - elevation: 974 ft (297 m)
- Length: 1.9 mi (3.1 km)
- Basin size: 0.73 mi^{2} (1.9 km^{2})

Basin features
- Progression: Lackawanna River → Susquehanna River → Chesapeake Bay
- Tributaries
  - right: one unnamed tributary

Lees Creek (also known as Shove Creek) is a tributary of the Lackawanna River in Lackawanna County, Pennsylvania, in the United States. It is approximately 1.9 miles (3.1 km) long and flows through Carbondale Township. The watershed of the creek has an area of 0.73 square miles (1.9 km^{2}). A reservoir known as the O and W Reservoir is located on it. The drainage basin of Lees Creek is designated as a Coldwater Fishery and a Migratory Fishery.

== Course ==
Lees Creek begins in a wetland on a plateau in Carbondale Township. It flows south-southeast for a few tenths of a mile and passes through a lake before turning south and flowing down a steep slope. The creek passes through the O and W Reservoir and turns south-southeast for a few tenths of a mile. It then receives an unnamed tributary from the left and turns southeast for several tenths of a mile, continuing down the slope. For some distance, it flows along the border between Carbondale Township and Mayfield before crossing a highway and reaching its confluence with the Lackawanna River.

Lees Creek joins the Lackawanna River 26.78 miles (43.10 km) upriver of its mouth.

== Hydrology ==
Lees Creek is not designated as an impaired stream. The creek is in "good condition" for most of its length. It experiences some flow loss upstream of US Business Route 6, but is still a perennial stream as far as the culvert that carries it under that highway. It eventually loses its flow completely.

== Geography and geology ==
The elevation near the mouth of Lees Creek is 974 feet (297 m) above sea level. The elevation of the creek's source is between 1,760 and 1,780 feet (536 and 543 m) above sea level. The headwaters of Lees Creek are on wetlands on West Mountain. The creek has a high gradient for some distance downstream of the O and W Reservoir. It also crosses Business Route 6. In its lower reaches, the channel of Lees Creek passes through coal waste, cinders, and railroad ballast.

== Watershed ==
The watershed of Lees Creek has an area of 0.73 square miles (1.9 km^{2}). The creek is entirely within the United States Geological Survey quadrangle of Carbondale. It is a small first-order stream. The O and W Reservoir, which has an area of 3 acres (1.2 ha) is on the creek. The creek was described as a "moderate-quality aquatic resource" in the 1990s.

== History ==
Lees Creek was entered into the Geographic Names Information System on August 2, 1979. Its identifier in the Geographic Names Information System is 1179126. The creek is also known as Shove Creek. This name appears on some United States Geological Survey maps.

Historically, the O and W Reservoir on Lees Creek was used as a water supply for the Mayfield Rail Yard of the New York, Ontario and Western Railway. This use ended in 1957 and the reservoir is now privately owned. And old railyard site is at the creek's mouth. The site is owned by the Lackawanna Heritage Valley Authority, which also owns the mouth of the creek.

In the early 2000s, the Lackawanna River Watershed Conservation Plan recommended that the lower 2,000 feet (610 m) of Lees Creek receive channel lining and restoration. This could have the effect of giving the creek a perennial flow. The conservation plan also recommended that Carbondale Township protect the creek.

== Biology ==
Lees Creek is designated as a Coldwater Fishery and a Migratory Fishery.

== See also ==
- Powderly Creek, next tributary of the Lackawanna River going downriver
- Meredith Creek, next tributary of the Lackawanna River going upriver
- List of rivers of Pennsylvania
- List of tributaries of the Lackawanna River
