= Meredith Creek =

Meredith Creek Brookside Run

Physical characteristics
- Source
  - location: Carbondale Township, Lackawanna County, Pennsylvania, United States
  - elevation: between 1,100 and 1,120 feet (340 and 340 m)
- Mouth
  - location: Lackawanna River in Carbondale Township, Lackawanna County, Pennsylvania
  - coordinates: 41°33′20″N 75°31′29″W
  - elevation: 1,001 ft (305 m)
- Length: 0.4 mi (0.64 km)

Basin features
- Progression: 1. Lackawanna River; 2. Susquehanna River; 3. Chesapeake Bay; 4. Atlantic Ocean

Meredith Creek (also known as Brookside Run) is a tributary of the Lackawanna River in Lackawanna County, Pennsylvania, in the United States. According to The National Map, it is approximately 0.4 miles (0.64 km) long and flows through Carbondale Township and Carbondale. (Note: The Lackawanna River Watershed Conservation Plan mentions the length as being 2 miles (3.2 km)) The creek is highly impacted by mining and experiences some flow loss. It is a small, first-order stream. Historic sites such as the New York, Ontario and Western Rail Yard and the Brookside Cemetery are in the creek's watershed.

== Course ==
Meredith Creek begins in Carbondale Township. It flows east for a short distance, almost immediately entering Carbondale and flowing along the border between in and Carbondale Township. Several hundred feet further downstream, it turns southeast for a short distance, reentering Carbondale Township and crossing a highway. The creek then reaches its confluence with the Lackawanna River.

Meredith Creek joins the Lackawanna River approximately 27.0 miles (43.5 km) upriver of its mouth.

== Hydrology, geography and geology ==
The elevation near the mouth of Meredith Creek is 1,001 feet (305 m) above sea level. The elevation of the creek's source is between 1,100 and 1,120 feet (340 and 340 m) above sea level.

Meredith Creek is highly impacted by strip mining and experiences flow loss. However, it does retain its channel. Perennial flow could be restored to Meredith Creek by lining the creek and regrading strip mine pits along it.

A portion of a mountain known as West Mountain is in the watershed of Meredith Creek.

== Watershed ==
Meredith Creek is entirely within the United States Geological Survey quadrangle of Carbondale.

Meredith Creek is a small first-order stream. In the early 2000s, the Lackawanna River Watershed Conservation Plan stated that the Lackawanna Valley Conservancy was available "to help plan and manage a greenway project" for the creek.

== History ==
Meredith Creek was entered into the Geographic Names Information System on May 4, 1998. Its identifier in the Geographic Names Information System is 1793648. The creek is also known as Brookside Run.

The former New York, Ontario and Western Rail Yard is located at the mouth of Meredith Creek. A historic burial ground known as the Brookside Cemetery is also in the creek's watershed. During or shortly before the early 2000s, some improvements were made to the cemetery site. This cemetery is described as a "signifcant [sic] cultural resource" in the Lackawanna River Watershed Conservation Plan".

In the early 2000s, the Lackawanna River Watershed Conservation Plan recommended that Carbondale Township and Carbondale include protection of Meredith Creek in their comprehensive plans, as well as their ordinances for land use, zoning, and subdivision.

== See also ==
- Lees Creek (Lackawanna River), next tributary of the Lackawanna River going downriver
- Fall Brook (Lackawanna River), next tributary of the Lackawanna River going upriver
- List of rivers of Pennsylvania
- List of tributaries of the Lackawanna River
