= Racket Brook =

Physical characteristics
- Source
  - location: Moosic Mountains in Canaan Township, Wayne County, Pennsylvania
  - elevation: between 1,940 and 1,960 feet (590 and 600 m)
- Mouth
  - location: Lackawanna River in Carbondale, Lackawanna County, Pennsylvania
  - coordinates: 41°34′35″N 75°30′05″W
  - elevation: 1,056 ft (322 m)
- Length: 3.6 mi (5.8 km)
- Basin size: 5.29 sq mi (13.7 km^{2})

Basin features
- Progression: Lackawanna River → Susquehanna River → Chesapeake Bay

Racket Brook is a tributary of the Lackawanna River in Wayne County and Lackawanna County, in Pennsylvania, in the United States. It is approximately 3.6 miles (5.8 km) long and flows through Canaan Township in Wayne County and Carbondale Township and Carbondale in Lackawanna County. The watershed of the stream has an area of 5.29 square miles (13.7 km^{2}). The stream has no named tributaries, but has two unnamed tributaries. It is not designated as impaired, but it does experience minor flow loss. It drains part of the Moosic Mountains and also flows through a ravine known as the Brownell Ravine.

Racket Brook is one of the larger tributaries of the Lackawanna River. There are a number of water supply reservoirs in its watershed: the Brownell Reservoir, Carbondale Reservoir Number 4, and Carbondale Reservoir Number 7. Anthracite has been mined in the stream's vicinity as early as 1820. The Delaware and Hudson Gravity Railroad inclined plane existed at its mouth by 1829 and there were railroad lines along the stream by the 1880s. In the 20th century, a number of bridges were constructed across the stream. Racket Brook is designated as a Coldwater Fishery and a Migratory Fishery.

== Course ==
Racket Brook begins in the Moosic Mountains in Canaan Township, Wayne County, just east of the Wayne County/Lackwanna County line. It flows west-northwest for several tenths of a mile, exiting Wayne County almost immediately and entering Carbondale Township, Lackawanna County. The stream then turns north and enters the Brownell Reservoir. From the northern end of that reservoir, it flows north for a short distance and crosses US Route 6 before turning west-northwest. A few tenths of a mile further downstream, it turns southwest and enters Carbondale. Over the next several tenths of a mile, the stream gradually turns northwest before crossing a highway and reaching its confluence with the Lackawanna River.

Racket Brook joins the Lackawanna River 29.44 miles (47.38 km) upriver of its mouth.

=== Tributaries ===
Racket Brook has no named tributaries. However, it does have two unnamed tributaries. These tributaries are known as "trib. to Brownwell Res." and "trib from Carbondale Res. No. 4". Their lengths are 1.6 miles (2.6 km) and 0.9 miles (1.4 km), respectively.

== Hydrology ==
Racket Brook is not designated as an impaired stream. However, it experiences some minor flow loss to mine pools in its lower reaches. Racket Brook is a perennial stream.

In the early 1900s, Racket Brook was found to be a clear stream from the Brownell Reservoir. However, its banks were lined with culm from the Racket Brook Colliery to a point 0.5 miles (0.80 km) downstream. Culm deposits were also found in the streambed. Additionally, municipal waste was discharged into the stream in its lower reaches. The city of Carbondale has had a permit to discharge stormwater into the stream.

At its mouth, the peak annual discharge of Racket Brook has a 10 percent chance of reaching 650 cubic feet per second. It has a 0.2, 1, or 2 percent chance of reaching 700 cubic feet per second.

== Geography and geology ==
The elevation near the mouth of Racket Brook is 1,056 feet (322 m) above sea level. The elevation of the stream's source is between 1,940 and 1,960 feet (590 and 600 m) above sea level.

Racket Brook's source is mainly fed by springs and seeps. The stream drains a number of small bogs, ponds, and wetlands. The stream drains the western part of Salem Hill, the highest part of the Moosic Mountains. Downstream of the Brownell Reservoir, it flows through a steep ravine known as the Brownell Ravine that has been partially filled in to allow US Route 6 to cross it.

A coal bed with a thickness of 3.5 feet (1.1 m) is located in the vicinity of Racket Brook.

== Watershed ==
The watershed of Racket Brook has an area of 5.29 square miles (13.7 km^{2}). The mouth of the steam is in the United States Geological Survey quadrangle of Carbondale. However, its source is in the quadrangle of Waymart.

Racket Brook is a second-order stream. It is one of the larger tributaries of the Lackawanna River. Most of the watershed is in Canaan Township, Wayne County and Carbondale Township, Lackawanna County. A smaller area is in Carbondale, Lackawanna County and an even smaller area is in Fell Township, Lackawanna County. The watershed is in the northeastern part of the Lackawanna River drainage basin.

As of the early 2000s, the Theta Land Company owns tracts of land in the upper reaches of the watershed of Racket Brook. Pennsylvania State Game Lands also occupy some tracts in this reach of the watershed, as do state correctional institute lands and private properties. The lower reaches of the watershed are in commercial, residential, and urban parts of Carbondale. As is typical for such stream reaches, there are encroachments by fill and urban litter in this reach.

Reservoirs in the watershed of Racket Brook include the Brownell Reservoir, Carbondale Reservoir Number 4, and Carbondale Reservoir Number 7. These reservoirs are operated by the Pennsylvania-American Water Company and are used as a supply of potable water for the city of Carbondale.

== History ==
Racket Brook was entered into the Geographic Names Information System on August 2, 1979. Its identifier in the Geographic Names Information System is 1192049.

Anthracite was being mined near the mouth of Racket Brook by 1820. The mining was done by William and Maurice Wurts, founders of the Delaware and Hudson Enterprise, which singlehandedly allowed the anthracite industry in the mid and upper Lackawanna River watershed to develop. Historically, the Racket Brook Colliery was in the stream's vicinity. It was owned by the Delaware and Hudson Coal Company. However, by the early 1900s, it had been abandoned and most of its buildings were torn down. Historic sites in the watershed of Racket Brook include the D&H sites and Gravity Inclines in Carbondale and the Racket Brook Vault in Carbondale Township. The first D&H gravity railroad inclined plane began operations at the mouth of the stream in 1829. The Lackawanna River Watershed Conservation Plan proposed a Heritage Landing at this site.

During an extreme flood on June 18, 1922, Racket Brook overflowed its banks and worsened the flooding caused by overflowing water reservoirs in the area. The flood was caused by a cloudburst and caused $2,000,000 in damage in the area. The city of Carbondale bore the brunt of the flood.

There were railroad lines along Racket Brook by the 1880s. The Delaware and Hudson railyard was constructed at the stream's mouth. A concrete stringer/multi-beam or girder bridge was constructed over Racket Brook in 1950. This bridge is 27.9 feet (8.5 m) long. Another bridge carrying a spur of U.S. Route 6 was built over the stream in Carbondale in 1963. This bridge is a steel stringer/multi-beam or girder bridge with a length of 41 feet (12 m).

In the early 2000s, the Lackawanna River Watershed Conservation Plan proposed a greenway/connecting trail along Racket Brook. Such a greenway could link to the D&H Transportation Heritage corridor. This trail could be known as the D&H Gravity/Racket Brook Trail. The Lackawanna River Watershed Conservation Plan also recommended that Carbondale Township and Carbondale include protection of Racket Brook in their comprehensive plans, as well as their ordinances for land use, zoning, and subdivision.

== Biology ==
The drainage basin of Racket Brook is designated as a Coldwater Fishery and a Migratory Fishery. Wild trout naturally reproduce in the stream from the Brownell Reservoir downstream to the mouth, a distance of 1.60 miles (2.57 km).

Ridgetop scrub oak/pitch pine barrens occur in the upper reaches of the watershed of Racket Brook. Hemlocks and rhododendrons inhabit the Brownell Ravine, which the stream flows through. Knotweed inhabits the area in the vicinity of the stream's lower reaches.

== See also ==
- Fall Brook (Lackawanna River), next tributary of the Lackawanna River going downriver
- Coal Brook, next tributary of the Lackawanna River going upriver
- List of rivers of Pennsylvania
- List of tributaries of the Lackawanna River
