= Red Spring Run =

Physical characteristics
- Source
  - location: base of a mountain in Ransom Township, Pennsylvania
  - elevation: between 1,020 and 1,040 feet (310 and 320 m)
- Mouth
  - location: Lackawanna River in Duryea, Luzerne County, Pennsylvania
  - coordinates: 41°21′21″N 75°45′56″W
  - elevation: 551 ft (168 m)
- Length: 1.5 mi (2.4 km)
- Basin size: 1.25 sq mi (3.2 km^{2})

Basin features
- Progression: Lackawanna River → Susquehanna River → Chesapeake Bay
- Tributaries
  - right: "Unnamed trib 1"

Red Spring Run (also known as Red Springs Run) is a tributary of the Lackawanna River in Lackawanna County and Luzerne County, in Pennsylvania in the United States. It is approximately 1.5 miles (2.4 km) long and flows through Ransom Township in Lackawanna County and Duryea in Luzerne County. The watershed of the stream has an area of 1.25 square miles (3.2 km^{2}). It is designated as a Coldwater Fishery and a Migratory Fishery. The stream has one unnamed tributary. Many reaches of the stream have been affected by mining and abandoned mines. The surficial geology in its vicinity features alluvium, coal dumps, surface mining land, and Wisconsinan Till.

== Course ==
Red Spring Run begins at the base of a mountain in Ransom Township, Lackawanna County. It flows south for several tenths of a mile before turning south-southeast for a short distance. The stream then turns south again, exiting Lackawanna County and entering Duryea, Luzerne County. It turns southwest for a few tenths of a mile before turning south-southwest for a few tenths of a mile. It then receives an unnamed tributary from the right and reaches its confluence with the Lackawanna River.

Red Spring Run joins the Lackawanna River 1.84 miles (2.96 km) upriver of its mouth.

=== Tributaries ===
Red Spring Run has no named tributaries. However, it does have one unnamed tributary, which is known as "Unnamed trib 1". Unnamed trib 1 is 1.2 miles (1.9 km) long.

== Geography and geology ==
The elevation near the mouth of Red Spring Run is 551 feet (168 m) above sea level. The elevation of the stream's source is between 1,020 and 1,040 feet (310 and 320 m) above sea level.

The waters of Red Spring Run contribute to the flooding of abandoned gravel pits near Coxton. These pits are locally known as the Duryea Swamps. Red Spring Run and its unnamed tributary both begin in springs on a mountain known as West Mountain. In its upper reaches, the stream descends steeply until it reaches the floodplain of the Lackawanna River.

As it flows downstream, Red Spring Run quickly becomes affected by abandoned mines. Some reaches of the stream have been entirely destroyed either by mining or by post-mining development. Its lower reaches are also affected by mining. The stream begins losing its flow upstream of Airport Sand and Gravel. Its mouth is in a concrete culvert.

The headwaters of Red Spring Run are at the border between the Llewellyn Formation and the Pocono Formation. The surficial geology near the lower reaches of the stream mainly consists of alluvium (which contains stratified sand, silt, and gravel, as well as some boulders) and coal dumps. Further upstream, the surficial geology mostly features land that has been surface mined for coal, with some coal dumps to the east. Near the headwaters of the stream, there is surface mining land as well as a glacial or resedimented till known as Wisconsinan Till.

== Watershed ==
The watershed of Red Spring Run has an area of 1.25 square miles (3.2 km^{2}). The watershed is in the southwestern part of the Lackawanna River watershed and in the lower reaches of that watershed. The stream is entirely within the United States Geological Survey quadrangle of Pittston.

Red Spring Run is a small, second-order stream. It is one of the last tributaries to enter the Lackawanna River.

At one location, Red Spring Run flows through a small residential area that is part of the Connells Patch neighborhood.

== History and industries ==
Red Spring Run was entered into the Geographic Names Information System on August 2, 1979. Its identifier in the Geographic Names Information System is 1184798.

The Lackawanna River Watershed Conservation Plan also recommended that Ransom Township and the borough of Duryea include protection of Red Spring Run in their comprehensive plans, as well as their ordinances for land use, zoning, and subdivision.

The Popple Brothers Colliery (formerly known as the Babylon Breaker) operates in the vicinity of Red Spring Run. Airport Sand and Gravel has an active quarry permit (#40900304) in the watershed. The Lehigh Valley Railroad historically crossed the stream near its mouth and the rail corridor still remains.

== Biology ==
The drainage basin of Red Spring Run is designated as a Coldwater Fishery and a Migratory Fishery.

== See also ==
- Saint Johns Creek (Pennsylvania), next tributary of the Lackawanna River going upriver
- List of rivers of Pennsylvania
- List of tributaries of the Lackawanna River
