= Fall Brook (Lackawanna River tributary) =

Physical characteristics
- Source
  - location: wetland near Birchtown in Clifford Township, Susquehanna County, Pennsylvania
  - elevation: between 1,720 and 1,740 feet (520 and 530 m)
- Mouth
  - location: Lackawanna River in Carbondale, Lackawanna County, Pennsylvania
  - coordinates: 41°34′05″N 75°30′36″W
  - elevation: 1,024 ft (312 m)
- Length: 7.9 mi (12.7 km)
- Basin size: 12.4 mi^{2} (32 km^{2})

Basin features
- Progression: Lackawanna River → Susquehanna River → Chesapeake Bay
- Tributaries
  - left: three unnamed tributaries
  - right: four unnamed tributaries

Fall Brook is a tributary of the Lackawanna River in Susquehanna County and Lackawanna County, Pennsylvania, in the United States. It is approximately 7.9 miles (12.7 km) long and flows through Clifford Township in Susquehanna County and Fell Township, Carbondale Township, and Carbondale in Lackawanna County. The watershed of the stream has an area of 12.4 square miles (32 km^{2}), making it one of the largest tributaries of the Lackwanna River. It is not designated as impaired, but does experience flow loss. The stream begins on the Allegheny Plateau and passes through the Fall Brook Gap. It also flows over the Fall Brook Falls, which are 60 feet (18 m) high. Fall Brook is situated within the Coal Region.

The upper reaches of the watershed of Fall Brook are mainly forested. However, some disturbed land is in the watershed's lower reaches. Lakes in the watershed include Fall Brook Lake. A number of sawmills were built along the stream in the 19th century and a number of bridges were constructed across it in the 20th century. Projects such as channelization and riprapping have been done on reaches of the stream in the second half of the 20th century. Fall Brook is a Coldwater Fishery and a Migratory Fishery. Wild trout naturally reproduce within it.

== Course ==
Fall Brook begins in a wetland near Birchtown in Clifford Township, Susquehanna County. It flows south-southwest for a few tenths of a mile before crossing Pennsylvania Route 247 and turning south. The stream then turns south-southwest again for several tenths of a mile, receiving an unnamed tributary from the right and exiting Clifford Township and Susquehanna County.

Upon exiting Susquehanna County, Fall Brook enters Fell Township, Lackawanna County. It continues south-southwest for more than a mile, passing through another wetland and receiving several more unnamed tributaries: three from the left and one from the right. The stream then turns south-southeast for several hundred feet before turning south-southwest again. After more than a mile, it turns southeast for a short distance and receives another unnamed tributary from the right before turning east-northeast. For the next several tenths of a mile, the stream flows east-northeast alongside Pennsylvania Route 106. The stream then turns east-southeast, entering a water gap and passing through Fall Brook Lake. After several tenths of a mile, it begins meandering south through the water gap for more than a mile, crossing Pennsylvania Route 106 several times. At the southern end of the water gap, it turns south and very briefly passes through Carbondale Township before entering Carbondale. A few tenths of a mile further downstream, the stream turns south-southeast. After several tenths of a mile, it turns south-southwest and receives an unnamed tributary from the right. The stream then turns south and reaches its confluence with the Lackawanna River.

Fall Brook joins the Lackawanna River 28.30 miles (45.54 km) upriver of its mouth.

=== Tributaries ===
Fall Brook has no officially named tributaries. However, it has a number of unofficially named tributaries. These include "Mountain Mud Pond Run", "Sandy Banks Run", "Unnamed trib 1", "Unnamed trib 2", "Finch Hill Run", "Crystal Lake Creek", and "Unnamed trib 3".

== Hydrology ==
Fall Brook is not designated as an impaired stream. However, the stream experiences flow loss to underground mine pools in Carbondale. The flow loss is caused by past deep mining and surface mining. In the summertime, reaches of the stream are completely dry in low flow conditions. Additionally, the lower reaches were affected by acid mine drainage as of the early 1990s. Around this time, the pH was found to be 6.9.

At its mouth, the peak annual discharge of Fall Brook has a 10 percent chance of reaching 1,210 cubic feet (34 m^{3}) per second. It has a 2 percent chance of reaching 2,300 cubic feet (65 m^{3}) per second and a 1 percent chance of reaching 2,880 cubic feet (82 m^{3}) per second. The peak annual discharge has a 0.2 percent chance of reaching 4,810 cubic feet (136 m^{3}) per second.

In the early 1900s, waste water from Murrins Colliery was discharged into Fall Brook. However, most of the stream's length was fairly clear at that time, despite having one culm deposit in its vicinity. The city of Carbondale has had an NPDES permit to discharge stormwater into Fall Brook.

== Geography and geology ==
The elevation near the mouth of Fall Brook is 1,024 feet (312 m) above sea level. The elevation of the stream's source is between 1,720 and 1,740 feet (520 and 530 m) above sea level.

Fall Brook begins on the Allegheny Plateau. It passes through a water gap known as the Fall Brook Gap, which cuts through West Mountain (also known as the Lackawanna Range). The Fall Brook Falls are on Fall Brook in the Fall Brook Gap in Carbondale Township. These falls are the largest waterfall in the Lackawanna River watershed, with a height of 60 feet (18 m). Additionally, the Fall Brook Glade is in the stream's watershed in Fell Township. Up to 0.25 miles (0.40 km) downstream of the Fall Brook Falls, steep slopes with drops of 100 feet (30 m) are present. Various groundwater seeps and ponds feed into the stream from Greenfield Township and Carbondale Township.

Fall Brook flows through an artificial channel lined with riprap in some reaches. The stream enters coal-bearing rock formations at the Fall Brook Falls, approximately 1,300 feet (400 m) above sea level. The stream is in the anthracite Coal Region. Its substrate mainly consists of boulders and sediment deposits from historic mining operations.

== Watershed ==
The watershed of Fall Brook has an area of 12.4 square miles (32 km^{2}). The mouth of the stream is in the United States Geological Survey quadrangle of Carbondale. However, its source is in the quadrangle of Clifford.

Not counting the East Branch Lackawanna River and the West Branch Lackawanna River, Fall Brook is the fifth-largest tributary of the Lackawanna River. Most of the watershed is in Fell Township, Lackawanna County and Greenfield Township, Lackawanna County. Smaller areas of the watershed are in Carbondale Township, Lackawanna County; Carbondale, Lackawanna County; and Clifford Township, Susquehanna County.

The upper reaches of the watershed of Fall Brook are mainly forested. However, there are also open fields, dairy farms, residential land, and golf courses in this reach of the watershed. The Fall Brook Reservoir is located in the middle reaches of the watershed, near Pennsylvania Route 106. It is owned by Pennsylvania American Water. Before its creation, the lake was planned to have an area of 62 acres (25 ha) and a volume of 1400 acre-feet. It was to have an earth fill dam with a length of 890 feet (270 m) and a height of 67 feet (20 m). In its lower reaches, the stream flows through highly disturbed strip mining land.

== History ==
Fall Brook was entered into the Geographic Names Information System on August 2, 1979. Its identifier in the Geographic Names Information System is 1174575.

The first graveyard in the area of Fell Township was built near Fall Brook. Additionally, the first sawmill in Fell Township was built on Fall Brook in 1824 by George Reynolds. The mill, which was in the southwestern part of the township, was destroyed by flooding, but later rebuilt. Several sawmills were later built along the stream as well, but in 1862, they were destroyed in a dam failure. The Sunrise Colliery, which was owned by the Sunrise Coal Company, historically operated on Fall Brook 0.5 miles (0.80 km) northwest of Carbondale. The colliery drained into the stream.

A prestressed box beam or girders bridge carrying T570B was constructed across Fall Brook in 1956. It is 33.1 feet (10.1 m) long and is situated in Fell Township. A concrete culvert bridge carrying Pennsylvania Route 106 over the stream was built in 1959. This bridge is 57.1 feet (17.4 m) long and is also in Fell Township. A prestressed box beam or girders bridge carrying the same highway across the stream in Fell Township was built in 1959 and repaired in 2007. This bridge is 60.0 feet (18.3 m) long. Another bridge of the same type and carrying that highway was built over the stream in 1959 in the same township and repaired in 2007. This bridge is 51.8 feet (15.8 m) long. A concrete culvert bridge carrying State Route 1009 was built across the stream in 1962. This bridge is also in Fell Township and is 27.9 feet (8.5 m) long. A prestressed box beam or girders bridge was built over the stream in Carbondale in 1984 and repaired in 1992. This bridge is 37.1 feet (11.3 m) long and carries State Route 6006.

Channelization work was done on 1.5 miles (2.4 km) of Fall Brook in Carbondale by the United States Bureau of Mines in 1965. In the 1960s and 1970s, Fall Brook and one of its tributaries were relocated to help with the Carbondale mine fire project. In the 1980s, a reach of the stream near the Carbondale High School was riprapped to counter erosion. By the early 2000s, a United States Army Corps of Engineers project had been proposed to alleviate flow loss in the stream.

== Biology ==
The drainage basin of Fall Brook is designated as a Coldwater Fishery and a Migratory Fishery. Wild trout naturally reproduce in the stream from its headwaters downstream to Fall Brook Lake, a distance of approximately 4.33 miles (6.97 km). However, in a February 1992 field survey, the stream was found to be devoid of finned fish, despite having conditions that could support them.

There is a successional riparian buffer on Fall Brook in Carbondale. However, due to soil conditions, there are no large trees in this riparian buffer.

== Recreation ==
In the early 2000s, the Lackawanna River Watershed Conservation Plan recommended constructing a greenway and/or connecting trail along Fall Brook. Such a trail would be known as the Fallbrook Trail. A greenway along the stream's corridor could link Carbondale to the Merli-Sarnoski Park and possibly the watershed of Tunkhannock Creek.

In 2015, the trout fishing season for Fall Brook in Susquehanna County opened on April 18.

== See also ==
- Meredith Creek, next tributary of the Lackawanna River going downriver
- Racket Brook, next tributary of the Lackawanna River going upriver
- List of rivers of Pennsylvania
- List of tributaries of the Lackawanna River
