= Hull Creek =

Hull Creek may refer to:

- Hull Creek (Lackawanna River), a stream in Lackawanna County, Pennsylvania
- Hull Creek (Potomac River), a stream in Northumberland County, Virginia
