= Callender Gap Creek =

Stream in Pennsylvania, United States

Callender Gap Creek Calender Gap Creek

Physical characteristics
- Source
  - location: Archbald, Lackawanna County, Pennsylvania
  - elevation: between 1,040 and 1,060 feet (320 and 320 m)
- Mouth
  - location: Lackawanna River in Jermyn, Lackawanna Count, Pennsylvania
  - coordinates: 41°31′37″N 75°32′48″W
  - elevation: 928 ft (283 m)
- Length: 0.8 mi (1.3 km)
- Basin size: 0.76 mi^{2} (2.0 km^{2})

Basin features
- Progression: Lackawanna River → Susquehanna River → Chesapeake Bay

Callender Gap Creek (also known as Calender Gap Creek) is a tributary of the Lackawanna River in Lackawanna County, Pennsylvania, in the United States. It is approximately 0.8 miles (1.3 km) long according to The National Map and flows through Archbald and Jermyn. (Note: The Lackawanna River Watershed Conservation Plan says that the length of the creek is 4 miles (6.4 km).) The watershed of the creek has an area of 0.76 square miles (2.0 km^{2}). The creek experiences total flow loss and is impaired. However, it is a coldwater fishery.

== Course ==
Callender Gap Creek begins in Archbald. It flows northeast for a few tenths of a mile before entering Jermyn and crossing a street. The creek then turns east-southeast. Over the next several tenths of a mile, it crosses several streets before reaching its confluence with the Lackawanna River.

== Hydrology ==
Callender Gap Creek is an impaired stream. The cause of the impairment is siltation and the source of the impairment is abandoned mine drainage.

Callender Gap Creek experiences total flow loss. It primarily serves to drain stormwater from residential areas in the borough of Jermyn. As of the early 2000s, materials such as utility trench waste are drained into the creek, possibly in violation of the Section 404 of the Clean Water Act and Chapter 25 of state water regulations. The borough of Jermyn once requested a permit to discharge stormwater into the creek.

== Geography and geology ==
The elevation near the mouth of Callender Gap Creek is 928 feet (283 m) above sea level. The elevation of the creek's source is between 1,040 and 1,060 feet (317 and 323 m) above sea level.

The channel of Callender Gap Creek is entirely obscured by strip mining and is culvertized.

== Watershed and biology ==
The watershed of Callender Gap Creek has an area of 0.76 square miles (2.0 km^{2}). is entirely within the United States Geological Survey quadrangle of Carbondale.

In the early 2000s, the Lackawanna River Watershed Conservation Plan recommended habitat restoration at the mouth of Callender Gap Creek. A grove of maple trees, a war memorial, and several picnic tables are located at the creek's mouth. The creek's use designation is for aquatic life.

Callender Gap Creek is a coldwater fishery.

== History ==
Callender Gap Creek was entered into the Geographic Names Information System on November 1, 1989. Its identifier in the Geographic Names Information System is 1201573.

In the early 2000s, the Lackawanna River Watershed Conservation Plan recommended that the boroughs of Archbald and Jermyn include the protection of Callender Gap Creek in their zoning plans, comprehensive plans, and other plans. The conservation plan also proposed the construction of a park at the creek's confluence with the Lackawanna River. It would be created from a borough-owned parcel of land, as well as all or part of a nearby privately owned parcel. The site could serve as a Heritage Landing for Jermyn and connect to the Lackawanna River Heritage Trail.

== See also ==
- Aylesworth Creek, next tributary of the Lackawanna River going downriver
- Rush Brook, next tributary of the Lackawanna River going upriver
- List of rivers of Pennsylvania
- List of tributaries of the Lackawanna River
