= Rush Brook =

Physical characteristics
- Source
  - location: wetland in Greenfield Township, Lackawanna County, Pennsylvania
  - elevation: between 1,640 and 1,660 feet (500 and 510 m)
- Mouth
  - location: Lackawanna River in Jermyn, Lackawanna County, Pennsylvania
  - coordinates: 41°31′54″N 75°32′32″W
  - elevation: 942 ft (287 m)
- Length: 5.1 mi (8.2 km)
- Basin size: 6.01 mi^{2} (15.6 km^{2})

Basin features
- Progression: Lackawanna River → Susquehanna River → Chesapeake Bay

Rush Brook is a tributary of the Lackawanna River in Lackawanna County, Pennsylvania, in the United States. It is approximately 5.1 miles (8.2 km) long and flows through Greenfield Township, Scott Township, Carbondale Township, Mayfield, and Jermyn. The watershed of the stream has an area of 6.01 square miles (15.6 km^{2}). The stream is not considered to be impaired and all but its lower reaches are mostly undisturbed. However, Pennsylvania Route 107 is in its vicinity. The stream begins on the Allegheny Plateau and flows through a water gap. It is a perennial stream.

Lakes in the watershed of Rush Brook include Heart Lake and the Rush Brook Reservoir. The stream is the main source of flooding in the borough of Jermyn. A number of bridges have been constructed across the stream. The drainage basin is designated as a Coldwater Fishery and a Migratory Fishery. Wild trout naturally reproduce in a portion of the stream's length.

== Course ==
Rush Brook begins in a wetland in Greenfield Township. It flows south for a short distance before turning southwest for a few tenths of a mile. The stream then turns south-southwest for several tenths of a mile, entering Scott Township and crossing Pennsylvania Route 107, which it begins to flow alongside. It eventually turns southeast for a few miles, entering Carbondale Township. In this reach, the stream enters a water gap through Cary Mountain and possibly another mountain and passes through the Rush Brook Reservoir. It continues flowing alongside Pennsylvania Route 107. Near the end of the water gap, it passes through Mayfield and enters Jermyn and continues flowing southeast for a short distance before crossing Pennsylvania Route 107 and US Route 6. It then turns east-southeast and flows through the streets of Jermyn alongside Pennsylvania Route 107. Several tenths of a mile further downstream, it reaches its confluence with the Lackawanna River.

Rush Brook joins the Lackawanna River 25.24 miles (40.62 km) upriver of its mouth.

=== Tributaries ===
Rush Brook has no named tributaries. However, it does have a number of unnamed tributaries. These are known as "Unnamed trip [sic] 1", "Unnamed trib 2", and "Unnamed trib 3".

== Hydrology ==
Rush Brook is not considered to be an impaired stream. It is also a perennial stream.

The peak annual discharge of Rush Brook has a 10 percent chance of reaching 840 cubic feet per second. It has a 2 percent chance of reaching 1780 cubic feet per second and a 1 percent chance of reaching 2360 cubic feet per second. The peak annual discharge has a 0.2 percent chance of reaching 4600 cubic feet per second.

== Geography and geology ==
The elevation near the mouth of Rush Brook is 942 feet (287 m) above sea level. The elevation of the creek's source is between 1,640 and 1,660 feet (500 and 510 m) above sea level.

Rush Brook begins on the Allegheny Plateau. It flows through a water gap known as the Rushbrook Gap. This water gap cuts through the Lackawanna Range. The headwaters of the creek are in a series of wetlands in Greenfield Township. It drains a number of small ponds, bogs, and wetlands.

The corridor of Rush Brook is largely undisturbed, except for its lower reaches, which are in Jermyn. The stream flows alongside Pennsylvania Route 107 for a substantial portion of its length. There are a few homes and businesses on this highway, but they have little impact on the stream's channel. The impacts that do occur are likely at points where the stream crosses Pennsylvania Route 107 and where stream bank has been stabilized.

From a spur of US Route 6 downstream to its mouth, Rush Brook's stream banks have been stabilized and/or channelized. They are stabilized with riprap in a 0.2-mile (0.3-kilometer) stretch of the stream near the residential part of Jermyn. As it enters the residential part of Jermyn, the stream flows through gabbion baskets and concrete floodwalls. However, the streambed is not stabilized and consists of cobbles and boulders. Backyards, parking lots, and streets border the stream's corridor in this reach. Further streabank stabilization possibilities are being considered in Jermyn.

Rush Brook was described as a "small brook" in the late 1800s. A dam on the stream is on the Pennsylvania Department of Environmental Protection's list of "dams of special concern", as of 2008.

== Watershed ==
The watershed of Rush Brook has an area of 6.01 square miles (15.6 km^{2}). The stream is entirely within the United States Geological Survey quadrangle of Carbondale.

Rush Brook is a second-order stream. It is one of the major tributaries of the Lackawanna River.

Lakes in the watershed of Rush Brook include Heart Lake and the Rush Brook Reservoir. The latter is a former water supply reservoir. A beaver dam is located at the inflow of the Rush Brook Reservoir and creates a wetland system.

Rush Brook is the main source of flooding in the borough of Jermyn. However, there are no major flooding problems, according to the borough officials. However, erosion and sedimentation can occur to some extent during periods of long or heavy rainfall. The only flooding damage caused by Rush Brook in Jermyn has been to adjacent lots and yards; no structures have been damaged.

== History and recreation ==
Rush Brook was entered into the Geographic Names Information System on August 2, 1979. Its identifier in the Geographic Names Information System is 1185636.

Jermyn was formerly known as Rushdale, a name that is derived from Rush Brook.

A concrete tee beam bridge carrying Lincoln Avenue over Rush Brook was constructed in 1930. It is 26.9 feet (8.2 m) long and is situated in Jermyn. A prestressed box beam or girders bridge carrying Pennsylvania Route 107 was constructed across the stream in 1931 and repaired in 1984. It is 29.9 feet (9.1 m) long and is situated in Scott Township. A steel truss bridge carrying US Route 6 over Pennsylvania Route 107 and Rush Brook was constructed in Mayfield in 1938 and repaired in 1986. This bridge is 107.9 feet (32.9 m) long. Another bridge carrying Pennsylvania Route 107 was built across the stream in Mayfield. This bridge is 37.1 feet (11.3 m) long and was built in 1988.

In the early 2000s, the Lackawanna River Watershed Conservation Plan recommended that Greenfield Township, Scott Township, Carbondale Township, Mayfield, and Jermyn include the protection of Rush Brook in their comprehensive plans, zoning plans, and other plans. The Department of General Services, Bureau of Engineering and Architecture once requested a permit to carry out a flood protection project, known as the Rush Brook Creek Project, in Jermyn. This project entailed removing culverts and stream enclosures along 2,600 feet (790 m) of the stream, constructing and maintaining 180 feet (55 m) of concrete walls, constructing and maintaining 1,853 feet (565 m) of stream channel, and other projects.

The old New York, Ontario and Western rail line crosses Rush Brook. In the early 2000s, the Lackawanna River Watershed Conservation Plan proposed creating a pedestrian bridge along the rail line over the stream. The original abutments still remain at this site. The conservation plan also recommended allocating a tract of land at the stream's mouth for use as a greenway linking to the Lackawanna River Heritage Trail.

Rush Brook flows through Pennsylvania State Game Lands Number 307. The area along the stream is the lowest point in these game lands.

== Biology ==
The drainage basin of Rush Brook is designated as a Coldwater Fishery and a Migratory Fishery. Wild trout naturally reproduce in the creek from the Rush Brook Reservoir downstream to its mouth, a distance of 1.79 miles (2.88 km).

In its upper reaches, Rush Brook tends to have a stable riparian buffer consisting of native trees and understory. However, there are a few disturbances to the riparian buffer. In its lower reaches, the stream is flanked by invasive vegetation, some of which even grows within the stream channel. In its last few hundred feet, the corridor is overgrown with successional vegetation.

== See also ==
- Callender Gap Creek, next tributary of the Lackawanna River going downriver
- Powderly Creek, next tributary of the Lackawanna River going upriver
- List of rivers of Pennsylvania
- List of tributaries of the Lackawanna River
