= List of tributaries of the Lackawanna River =

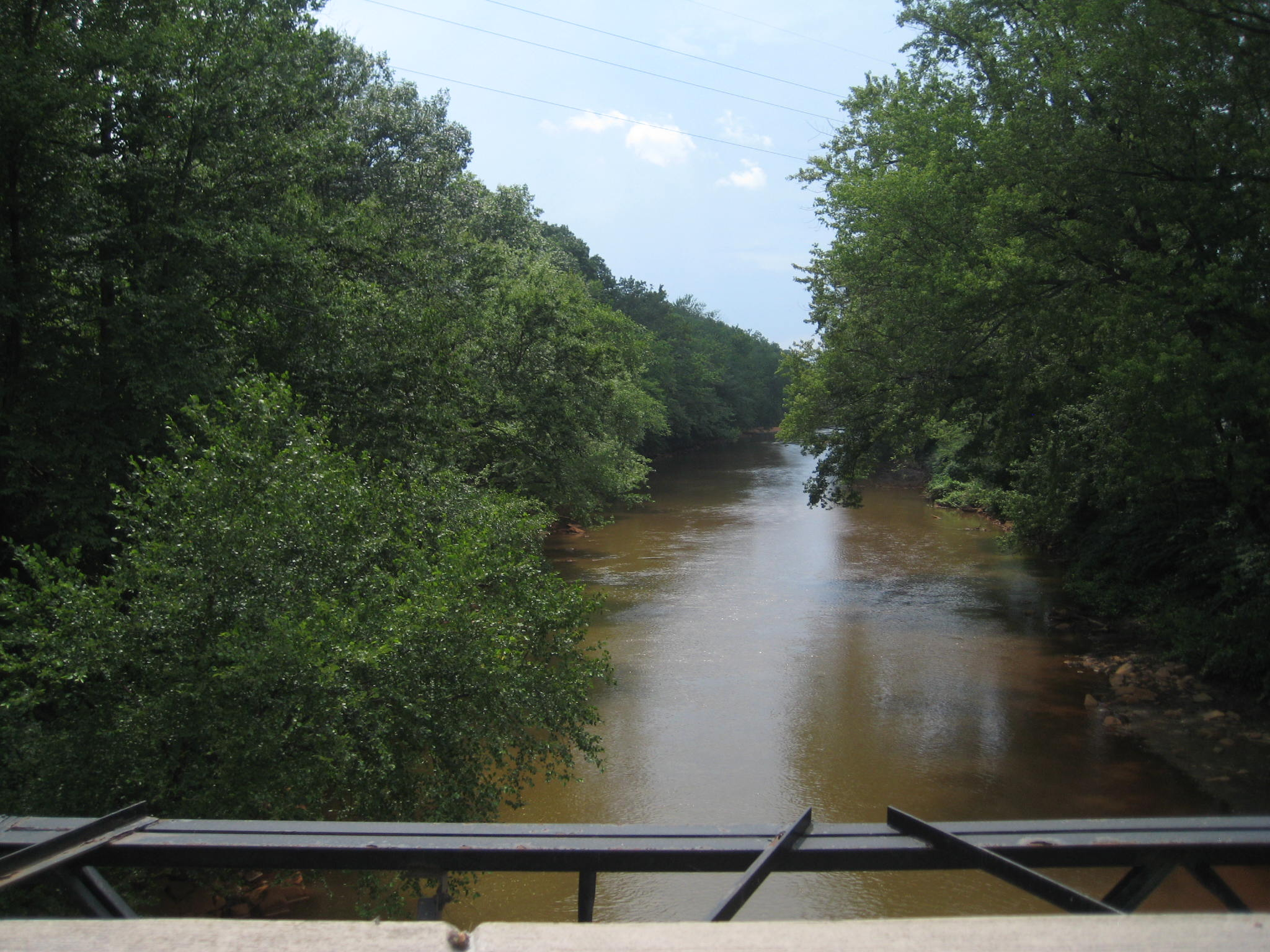
The Lackawanna River in its lower reaches

The Lackawanna River is a 40-mile (64 km) long river flowing into the Susquehanna River with 65 named tributaries, of which 33 are direct tributaries. The river flows through Susquehanna, Lackawanna, and Luzerne Counties in Pennsylvania. The shortest tributary is 0.4 miles (0.64 km) long, while the longest is 21 miles (34 km) long. The tributaries include 40 creeks, 14 brooks, 9 runs, and 2 rivers. By length, the five largest tributaries are Roaring Brook, Spring Brook, the East Branch Lackawanna River, Stafford Meadow Brook, and the West Branch Lackawanna River. By watershed area, the five largest tributaries are Spring Brook, Roaring Brook, the East Branch Lackawanna River, Leggetts Creek, and the West Branch Lackawanna River.

Of the 37 tributaries of the Lackawanna River that have their own Chapter 93.9 designations, most are designated as Coldwater Fisheries. However, two tributaries (Eddy Creek and part of Stafford Meadow Brook) are designated as Warmwater Fisheries instead. An additional two tributaries (Summit Lake Creek and part of Leggetts Creek) are designated as Trout-Stocked Fisheries. Parts of six are designated as High-Quality Coldwater Fisheries: the East Branch Lackawanna River, the West Branch Lackawanna River, and parts of Grassy Island Creek, Roaring Brook, Stafford Meadow Brook, and Spring Brook. One tributary, Clarks Creek, holds an Exceptional Value designation. (Note: Coldwater Fishery, Warmwater Fishery, Trout-Stocked Fishery, High-Quality Coldwater Fishery, and Exceptional Value are all official designations. The first means that a stream supports fish from the family Salmonidae and other cold-water fauna and flora. The second means that a stream supports warm-water fauna and flora. Trout-Stocked Fishery means that a stream supports the maintenance of stocked trout. High-Quality Coldwater Fishery and Exceptional Value are designations for streams that meet the Coldwater Fishery criteria and also have high water quality.) Wild trout naturally reproduce in approximately 30 of the tributaries.

Many tributaries of the Lackawanna River are environmentally degraded. At least 16 tributaries experience some degree of flow loss and at least 11 of those experience total flow loss. At least five tributaries, including Red Spring Run; Meadow Brook; Eddy Creek; Callender Gap Creek; and Coal Brook, have had reaches partially or totally destroyed by mining or by post-mining development. Extensive deposits of culm and silts from mining operations occur in the watersheds of at least seven tributaries, including Saint Johns Creek, Mill Creek, Keyser Creek, Eddy Creek, Sterry Creek, Grassy Island Creek, and Coal Brook.

The watersheds of at least 16 tributaries of the Lackawanna River contain waterfalls or morphologic sites such as water gaps and escarpments. The watershed of the tributary Roaring Brook contains seven such sites, though two are in the sub-watersheds of Rock Bottom Creek and Little Roaring Brook. There are also dozens of named ponds and lakes—both natural and manmade— in the watersheds of more than 15 of the tributaries. Bogs and wetland complexes occur in the watersheds of about 12 tributaries.

== Tributaries of the Lackawanna River ==
=== Tributaries of the main stem ===
Name	Length	Watershed area	Distance from mouth	Mouth elevation	Source elevation	Coordinates
Red Spring Run	1.5 miles (2.4 km)	1.25 square miles (3.2 km^{2})	1.84 miles (2.96 km)	551 feet (168 m)	1,020 to 1,040 feet (310 to 320 m)	41°21′20″N 75°45′56″W
Saint Johns Creek	6.4 miles (10.3 km)	7.20 square miles (18.6 km^{2})	2.60 miles (4.18 km)	578 feet (176 m)	1,800 to 1,820 feet (550 to 550 m)	41°21′28″N 75°45′09″W
Mill Creek	5.5 miles (8.9 km)	10.6 square miles (27 km^{2})	3.30 miles (5.31 km)	604 feet (184 m)	1,200 to 1,220 feet (370 to 370 m)	41°21′23″N 75°44′33″W
Spring Brook	17 miles (27 km)	57.2 square miles (148 km^{2})	3.62 miles (5.83 km)	617 feet (188 m)	1,860 feet (570 m)	41°21′26″N 75°44′13″W
Keyser Creek	6.1 miles (9.8 km)	8.59 square miles (22.2 km^{2})	7.20 miles (11.59 km)	643 feet (196 m)	1,760 to 1,780 feet (540 to 540 m)	41°23′04″N 75°42′11″W
Stafford Meadow Brook	11.2 miles (18.0 km)	14.1 square miles (37 km^{2})	9.06 miles (14.58 km)	673 feet (205 m)	1,560 to 1,580 feet (480 to 480 m)	41°23′47″N 75°40′36″W
Roaring Brook	21 miles (34 km)	56.3 square miles (146 km^{2})	9.52 miles (15.32 km)	659 feet (201 m)	1,940 to 1,960 feet (590 to 600 m)	41°24′07″N 75°40′24″W
Meadow Brook	2.0 miles (3.2 km)	2.43 square miles (6.3 km^{2})	11.83 miles (19.04 km)	692 feet (211 m)	920 to 940 feet (280 to 290 m)	41°25′30″N 75°39′31″W
Leggetts Creek	9.0 miles (14.5 km)	18.5 square miles (48 km^{2})	14.36 miles (23.11 km)	715 feet (218 m)	1,600 to 1,620 feet (490 to 490 m)	41°26′41″N 75°38′36″W
Price Creek	2.0 miles (3.2 km)			732 feet (223 m)	1,360 to 1,380 feet (410 to 420 m)	41°27′28″N 75°37′14″W
Eddy Creek	5.7 miles (9.2 km)	7.53 square miles (19.5 km^{2})	16.84 miles (27.10 km)	758 feet (231 m)	1,720 to 1,740 feet (520 to 530 m)	41°27′48″N 75°36′36″W
Hull Creek	4.1 miles (6.6 km)	3.22 square miles (8.3 km^{2})	17.56 miles (28.26 km)	755 feet (230 m)	1,560 to 1,580 feet (480 to 480 m)	41°28′14″N 75°36′24″W
Wildcat Creek	3.8 miles (6.1 km)	4.49 square miles (11.6 km^{2})	18.55 miles (29.85 km)	771 feet (235 m)	1,540 to 1,560 feet (470 to 480 m)	41°28′34″N 75°35′26″W
Sterry Creek	4.7 miles (7.6 km)	4.92 square miles (12.7 km^{2})	18.98 miles (30.55 km)	784 feet (239 m)	1,820 to 1,840 feet (550 to 560 m)	41°28′33″N 75°34′58″W
Grassy Island Creek	4.4 miles (7.1 km)	5.42 square miles (14.0 km^{2})	20.36 miles (32.77 km)	830 feet (250 m)	2,140 to 2,160 feet (650 to 660 m)	41°28′46″N 75°49′04″W
Laurel Run	3.6 miles (5.8 km)	2.72 square miles (7.0 km^{2})	21.82 miles (35.12 km)	838 feet (255 m)	2,160 to 2,180 feet (660 to 660 m)	41°29′23″N 75°32′30″W
White Oak Run	3.4 miles (5.5 km)	5.11 square miles (13.2 km^{2})	22.42 miles (36.08 km)	892 feet (272 m)	2,180 to 2,200 feet (660 to 670 m)	41°29′49″N 75°32′24″W
Aylesworth Creek	4.9 miles (7.9 km)	6.73 square miles (17.4 km^{2})	24.30 miles (39.11 km)	925 feet (282 m)	1,560 to 1,580 feet (480 to 480 m)	41°31′13″N 75°32′41″W
Callender Gap Creek	0.8 miles (1.3 km)	0.76 square miles (2.0 km^{2})		928 feet (283 m)	1,040 to 1,060 feet (320 to 320 m)	41°13′37″N 75°32′47″W
Rush Brook	5.1 miles (8.2 km)	6.01 square miles (15.6 km^{2})	25.24 miles (40.62 km)	942 feet (287 m)	1,640 to 1,660 feet (500 to 510 m)	41°31′54″N 75°32′33″W
Powderly Creek	2.3 miles (3.7 km)	1.77 square miles (4.6 km^{2})	26.42 miles (42.52 km)	965 feet (294 m)	1,140 to 1,160 feet (350 to 350 m)	41°32′43″N 75°31′57″W
Lees Creek	1.9 miles (3.1 km)	0.73 square miles (1.9 km^{2})	26.78 miles (43.10 km)	974 feet (297 m)	1,760 to 1,780 feet (540 to 540 m)	41°32′59″N 75°31′44″W
Meredith Creek	0.4 miles (0.64 km)			1,001 feet (305 m)	1,100 to 1,120 feet (340 to 340 m)	41°33′20″N 75°31′28″W
Fall Brook	7.9 miles (12.7 km)	12.4 square miles (32 km^{2})	28.30 miles (45.54 km)	1,024 feet (312 m)	1,720 to 1,740 feet (520 to 530 m)	41°34′05″N 75°30′36″W
Racket Brook	3.6 miles (5.8 km)	5.29 square miles (13.7 km^{2})	29.44 miles (47.38 km)	1,056 feet (322 m)	1,940 to 1,960 feet (590 to 600 m)	41°34′34″N 73°30′05″W
Coal Brook	2.2 miles (3.5 km)	1.93 square miles (5.0 km^{2})	29.76 miles (47.89 km)	1,083 feet (330 m)	1,700 to 1,720 feet (520 to 520 m)	41°35′06″N 75°29′52″W
Wilson Creek	3.7 miles (6.0 km)	3.82 square miles (9.9 km^{2})	30.82 miles (49.60 km)	1,129 feet (344 m)	1,880 to 1,900 feet (570 to 580 m)	41°35′35″N 75°29′05″W
Rogers Brook	1.8 miles (2.9 km)			1,404 feet (428 m)	2,000 to 2,020 feet (610 to 620 m)	41°38′19″N 75°27′27″W
Clarks Creek	2.2 miles (3.5 km)	3.37 square miles (8.7 km^{2})	34.8 miles (56.0 km)	1,407 feet (429 m)	1,780 to 1,800 feet (540 to 550 m)	41°38′36″N 75°27′30″W
Meredith Brook	2.1 miles (3.4 km)		35.1 miles (56.5 km)	1,414 feet (431 m)	1,700 to 1,720 feet (520 to 520 m)	41°38′42″N 75°27′41″W
Brace Brook	2.9 miles (4.7 km)	2.99 square miles (7.7 km^{2})	36.96 miles (59.48 km)	1,473 feet (449 m)	2,040 to 2,060 feet (620 to 630 m)	41°39′43″N 75°27′50″W
East Branch Lackawanna River	12.7 miles (20.4 km)	19.0 square miles (49 km^{2})	40.32 miles (64.89 km)	1,572 feet (479 m)	2,020 to 2,040 feet (620 to 620 m)	41°42′09″N 75°29′06″W
West Branch Lackawanna River	9.5 miles (15.3 km)	16.8 square miles (44 km^{2})	40.32 miles (64.89 km)	1,572 feet (479 m)	2,000 to 2,020 feet (610 to 620 m)	41°42′41″N 75°29′06″W

=== Tributaries of Mill Creek ===
Name	Length	Watershed area	Distance from mouth	Mouth elevation	Source elevation	Coordinates
Lidy Creek	1.9 miles (3.1 km)	1.50 square miles (3.9 km^{2})	2.46 miles (3.96 km)	709 feet (216 m)	1,020 to 1,040 feet (310 to 320 m)	41°18′38″N 75°44′55″W
Collins Creek	2.8 miles (4.5 km)	1.39 square miles (3.6 km^{2})	3.66 miles (5.89 km)	873 feet (266 m)	1,260 to 1,280 feet (380 to 390 m)	41°19′35″N 75°44′49″W

=== Tributaries of Spring Brook ===
Name	Length	Watershed area	Distance from mouth	Mouth elevation	Source elevation	Coordinates
Covey Swamp Creek	2.2 miles (3.5 km)			709 feet (216 m)	1,080 to 1,100 feet (330 to 340 m)	41°21′07″N 75°42′50″W
Monument Creek	2.8 miles (4.5 km)			869 feet (265 m)	1,620 to 1,640 feet (490 to 500 m)	41°19′41″N 75°41′24″W
Green Run	4.7 miles (7.6 km)	4.32 square miles (11.2 km^{2})	6.48 miles (10.43 km)	1,152 feet (351 m)	1,640 to 1,660 feet (500 to 510 m)	41°19′47″N 75°39′24″W
Rattlesnake Creek	5.0 miles (8.0 km)	9.18 square miles (23.8 km^{2})	7.96 miles (12.81 km)	1,171 feet (357 m)	1,680 to 1,700 feet (510 to 520 m)	41°18′51″N 75°38′17″W
Plank Bridge Creek	2.4 miles (3.9 km)	1.26 square miles (3.3 km^{2})	8.65 miles (13.92 km)	1,188 feet (362 m)	1,880 to 1,900 feet (570 to 580 m)	41°18′20″N 75°38′37″W
Panther Creek	2.7 miles (4.3 km)	7.18 square miles (18.6 km^{2})	10.40 miles (16.74 km)	1,309 feet (399 m)	1,900 to 1,920 feet (580 to 590 m)	41°17′30″N 75°37′14″W

=== Tributaries of Keyser Creek ===
Name	Length	Watershed area	Distance from mouth	Mouth elevation	Source elevation	Coordinates
Lucky Run	2.4 miles (3.9 km)	1.66 square miles (4.3 km^{2})	2.32 miles (3.73 km)	778 feet (237 m)	1,700 to 1,720 feet (520 to 520 m)	41°24′45″N 75°42′00″W
Lindy Creek	2.3 miles (3.7 km)	1.53 square miles (4.0 km^{2})	2.86 miles (4.60 km)	814 feet (248 m)	1,840 to 1,860 feet (560 to 570 m)	41°25′05″N 75°41′47″W

=== Tributaries of Roaring Brook ===
Name	Length	Watershed area	Distance from mouth	Mouth elevation	Source elevation	Coordinates
Little Roaring Brook	3.4 miles (5.5 km)	3.06 square miles (7.9 km^{2})	4.70 miles (7.56 km)	1,010 feet (310 m)	1,520 to 1,540 feet (460 to 470 m)	41°24′52″N 75°36′35″W
Rock Bottom Creek	3.2 miles (5.1 km)	3.06 square miles (7.9 km^{2})	9.84 miles (15.84 km)	1,306 feet (398 m)	1,720 to 1,740 feet (520 to 530 m)	41°23′23″N 75°33′15″W
White Oak Run	2.3 miles (3.7 km)	3.22 square miles (8.3 km^{2})	11.78 miles (18.96 km)	1,417 feet (432 m)	1,680 to 1,700 feet (510 to 520 m)	41°22′27″N 75°31′16″W
Kellum Creek	2.9 miles (4.7 km)	2.56 square miles (6.6 km^{2})	12.80 miles (20.60 km)	1,424 feet (434 m)	1,660 to 1,680 feet (510 to 510 m)	41°21′25″N 75°31′25″W
Van Brunt Creek	3.3 miles (5.3 km)			1,476 feet (450 m)	1,720 to 1,740 feet (520 to 530 m)	41°20′21″N 75°03′51″W
Bear Brook	3.0 miles (4.8 km)	2.26 square miles (5.9 km^{2})	14.48 miles (23.30 km)	1,473 feet (449 m)	1,800 to 1,820 feet (550 to 550 m)	41°20′22″N 75°30′51″W
East Branch Roaring Brook	3.7 miles (6.0 km)	5.90 square miles (15.3 km^{2})	17.14 miles (27.58 km)	1,654 feet (504 m)	1,940 to 1,960 feet (590 to 600 m)	41°18′28″N 75°29′19″W
Lake Run	1.6 miles (2.6 km)	3.44 square miles (8.9 km^{2})	17.50 miles (28.16 km)	1,654 feet (504 m)	1,900 feet (580 m)	41°18′12″N 75°29′14″W

=== Tributaries of Leggetts Creek ===
Name	Length	Watershed area	Distance from mouth	Mouth elevation	Source elevation	Coordinates
Leach Creek	1.9 miles (3.1 km)	2.55 square miles (6.6 km^{2})	1.00 mile (1.61 km)	781 feet (238 m)	1,320 to 1,340 feet (400 to 410 m)	41°26′34″N 75°39′39″W
Clover Hill Creek	1.6 miles (2.6 km)	2 square miles (5.2 km^{2})	2 miles (3.2 km)	906 feet (276 m)	1,760 to 1,780 feet (540 to 540 m)	41°27′18″N 75°39′44″W
Summit Lake Creek	2.1 miles (3.4 km)	3.08 square miles (8.0 km^{2})	3.90 miles (6.28 km)	1,063 feet (324 m)	1,260 to 1,280 feet (380 to 390 m)	41°28′31″N 75°40′59″W

=== Other tributaries ===
Name	Tributary to	Length	Watershed area	Distance from mouth	Mouth elevation	Source elevation	Coordinates
Trout Creek	Monument Creek	3.4 miles (5.5 km)			935 feet (285 m)	1,760 to 1,780 feet (540 to 540 m)	41°19′31″N 75°41′17″W
Six Springs Creek	Rattlesnake Creek	2.1 miles (3.4 km)	2.95 square miles (7.6 km^{2})	3.40 miles (5.47 km)	1,450 feet (440 m)	1,700 to 1,720 feet (520 to 520 m)	41°18′53″N 75°35′01″W
Painter Creek	Panther Creek	3.4 miles (5.5 km)	4.51 square miles (11.7 km^{2})	0.90 miles (1.45 km)	1,411 feet (430 m)	2,000 to 2,020 feet (610 to 620 m)	41°16′58″N 75°37′50″W
Mountain Lake Run	Stafford Meadow Brook		2 square miles (5.2 km^{2})		801 feet (244 m)		41°23′24″N 75°39′49″W
Langan Creek	Van Brunt Creek	2.5 miles (4.0 km)			1,535 feet (468 m)	1,760 to 1,780 feet (540 to 540 m)	41°20′06″N 75°31′06″W
Emerson Run	Lake Run	1.8 miles (2.9 km)	1.58 square miles (4.1 km^{2})	0.84 miles (1.35 km)	1,709 feet (521 m)	1,840 to 1,860 feet (560 to 570 m)	41°17′37″N 75°59′23″W
South Branch Leach Creek	Leach Creek	0.8 miles (1.3 km)	0.463 square miles (1.20 km^{2})		1,066 feet (325 m)	1,780 to 1,800 feet (540 to 550 m)	41°27′00″N 75°40′38″W
Pancoast Creek	Price Creek	2.0 miles (3.2 km)	0.880 square miles (2.28 km^{2})		751 feet (229 m)	1,580 to 1,600 feet (480 to 490 m)	41°27′35″N 75°37′16″W
West Branch Tinklepaugh Creek	Wildcat Creek	2.2 miles (3.5 km)	1.490 square miles (3.86 km^{2})		843 feet (257 m)	1,920 to 1,940 feet (590 to 590 m)	41°29′12″N 75°35′12″W
Indian Cave Creek	White Oak Run (Lackawanna River)	1.9 miles (3.1 km)	1.59 square miles (4.1 km^{2})	1.27 miles (2.04 km)	1,319 feet (402 m)	1,960 to 1,980 feet (600 to 600 m)	41°29′51″N 75°31′00″W
Fiddle Lake Creek	West Branch Lackawanna River	6.0 miles (9.7 km)	6.47 square miles (16.8 km^{2})	1.20 miles (1.93 km)	1,591 feet (485 m)	2,000 to 2,020 feet (610 to 620 m)	41°42′59″N 75°29′20″W

== See also ==
- List of rivers of Pennsylvania
