= Saint Johns Creek (Pennsylvania) =

Saint Johns Creek St Johns Creek, Ascension Brook

Physical characteristics
- Source
  - location: Pinnacle Rock in Ransom Township, Lackawanna County, Pennsylvania
  - elevation: between 1,800 and 1,820 feet (550 and 550 m)
- Mouth
  - location: Lackawanna River in Old Forge, Lackawanna County, Pennsylvania
  - coordinates: 41°21′28″N 75°45′09″W
  - elevation: 568 ft (173 m)
- Length: 6.4 mi (10.3 km)
- Basin size: 7.20 mi^{2} (18.6 km^{2})

Basin features
- Progression: Lackawanna River → Susquehanna River → Chesapeake Bay
- Tributaries
  - right: three unnamed tributaries

Saint Johns Creek (also known as St Johns Creek or Ascension Brook) is a tributary of the Lackawanna River in Lackawanna County, Pennsylvania, in the United States. It is approximately 6.4 miles (10.3 km) long and flows through Ransom Township, Taylor, and Old Forge. The watershed of the creek has an area of 7.20 square miles (18.6 km^{2}). It is designated as a Coldwater Fishery and a Migratory Fishery. However, it is considered to be impaired by flow alterations and siltation/sedimentation and is also an intermittent stream. There were historically two superfund sites on the creek. A number of bridges cross the creek and the Lehigh Valley Railroad historically passed through the watershed.

== Course ==
Saint Johns Creek begins on Pinnacle Rock in Ransom Township. It flows east for a short distance before turning southeast for several tenths of a mile. It then turns south for several tenths of a mile and enters Taylor. At this point, the creek turns southeast again. After a few tenths of a mile, it turns south-southeast and then southwest, passing through a pond. It then turns west for several tenths of a mile before receiving an unnamed tributary from the right and turning south. After a few tenths of a mile, the creek turns south-southwest, crossing Rt 476, Pa Turnpike and receiving another unnamed tributary from the right. It then turns south-southeast and passes through another pond before turning southwest for a few miles, entering Old Forge and receiving a third unnamed tributary from the right. The creek eventually turns south for a few tenths of a mile before turning west and then south again. Several tenths of a mile further downstream, it reaches its confluence with the Lackawanna River.

Saint Johns Creek joins the Lackawanna River 2.60 miles (4.18 km) upriver of its mouth.

=== Tributaries ===
Saint Johns Creek has no officially named tributaries. However, it does have unofficially named tributaries such as Race Brook and Sawmill Creek. It also has one unnamed tributary.

== Hydrology ==
Saint Johns Creek is considered to be impaired. The causes of impairment are flow alteration and siltation/sedimentation. The likely source of the impairment is abandoned mine drainage.

The concentration of manganese in Saint Johns Creek above one of the former superfund sites on it was 38 parts per million in 1985. The concentration of zinc was 27 parts per million. Downstream of the former superfund site, the manganese concentration was 242 to 306 parts per million and the zinc concentration was 20 to 33 parts per million.

Downstream of one of the former superfund sites on Saint Johns Creek, the concentration of acetone rangesd from 18.9 to 19.7 parts per billion and the concentration of methylene chloride ranged from 0 to 68 parts per billion in 1985. The concentration of 2-butanone ranged from 46.8 to 88.4 parts per billion and the concentration of 4-Methyl-2-pentanone ranged from 4.5 to 16.1 parts per billion. The concentration of Bis (2-Ethylhexyl) Phthalate ranged from 0 to 468 parts per billion. Upstream of the former superfund site, the concentrations of acetone, 2-butanone, 4-Methyl-2-pentanone, and Bis (2-Ethylhexyl) Phthalate were all 0 parts per billion. The concentration of methylene chloride ranged from 0 to 15 parts per billion.

Saint Johns Creek loses its flow due to fissures created by mine subsidence. For this reason, it is dry except during and shortly after rain and is thus an intermittent stream. When it is not dry, its flow mainly consists of raw sewage. It also loses flow to a landfill. The mouth of the creek is 500 feet (150 m) from the Old Forge Borehole, one of the largest acid mine drainage sources in the Coal Region. There are some leachate seeps flowing into the creek. Environmental & Recycling Services, Inc. has a permit to discharge stormwater into Saint Johns Creek.

== Geography and geology ==
The elevation near the mouth of Saint Johns Creek is 568 feet (173 m) above sea level. The elevation near the source of the creek is between 1,800 and 1,820 feet (550 and 550 m) above sea level.

There are three combined sewer overflow diversion chambers along Saint Johns Creek and its tributaries. The remains of water works can be found along the unofficially named tributary Race Brook and the tributary Sawmill Brook is in an artificial channel. Saint Johns Creek itself is also partially channelized in some locations.

The headwaters of Saint Johns Creek are on West Mountain. It begins on springs on that mountain. The creek flows steeply downhill in its upper reaches before entering a nearly level floodplain near Keyser Avenue.

Extensive deposits of culm and silt occur in the watershed of Saint Johns Creek. The deposits are left over from mining activity. Mine sheet XI and mine sheet XIII are in the vicinity of the creek.

== Watershed ==
The watershed of Saint Johns Creek has an area of 7.20 square miles (18.6 km^{2}). The watershed is in the southwestern part of the Lackawanna River watershed. It occupies parts of Old Forge, Taylor, and Ransom Township, as well as a tiny corner of Newton Township. The mouth of the creek is in the United States Geological Survey quadrangle of Pittston. However, its source is in the quadrangle of Scranton. The creek also passes through the quadrangle of Avoca.

The Race Brook Falls are in the watershed of Saint Johns Creek. The Old Forge High School Campus and the Eagle McLure Fire Company grounds are also in the watershed. The Lackawanna Refuse Site is also in the floodplain of the creek and the Lackawanna River. The creek flows past two superfund sites as of 1985. However, at least one was repaired in the 1980s.

In Old Forge, the creek would flow out of its channel and through a low-lying area near Connell Street in the event of a 500 year flood.

The designated use of Saint Johns Creek is aquatic life.

== History ==
Saint Johns Creek was entered into the Geographic Names Information System on August 2, 1979. Its identifier in the Geographic Names Information System is 1186170. The creek is also known as Ascension Brook. This name appears in Patton's Philadelphia and Suburbs Street and Road Map, which was published in 1984.

A concrete tee beam bridge was built over Saint Johns Creek in Old Forge in 1940. It is 25.9 feet (7.9 m) long and carries State Route 3011/Keyser Ave. A concrete slab bridge was constructed across the creek in Taylor in 1957 and repaired in 1995. It is 23.0 feet (7.0 m) long and carries State Route 3011. The Lehigh Valley Railroad historically passed through the creek's watershed.

Saint Johns Creek experienced bank failure in flooding events in Old Forge in 1985 and 1996.

The construction of an Eagle Hose Co. CSO Regulator in the vicinity of Saint Johns Creek has been planned. Greenways and connecting trails along the creek are recommended in the Lackawanna River Watershed Conservation Plan.

== Biology ==
The entire drainage basin of Saint Johns Creek is designated as a Coldwater Fishery and a Migratory Fishery. However, it was historically designated as a Warmwater Fishery.

Due to its lack of consistent flow, Saint Johns Creek is incapable of supporting any fish or aquatic wildlife.

== Recreation ==
The Connells Patch Softball Complex is in the watershed of Saint Johns Creek. As of 2001, the Sibley Avenue recreation site and the Milwaukee Avenue soccer field are also under development in the watershed.

== See also ==
- Red Spring Run, next tributary of the Lackawanna River going downriver
- Mill Creek (Lackawanna River), next tributary of the Lackawanna River going upriver
- List of rivers of Pennsylvania
- List of tributaries of the Lackawanna River
