= Wildcat Creek (Lackawanna River tributary) =

Physical characteristics
- Source
  - location: valley between Hibbard Mountain and Meyers Mountain in Archbald, Lackawanna County, Pennsylvania
  - elevation: between 1,540 and 1,560 feet (470 and 480 m)
- Mouth
  - location: Lackawanna River in Blakely, Lackawanna County, Pennsylvania
  - coordinates: 41°28′35″N 75°35′25″W
  - elevation: 771 ft (235 m)
- Length: 3.8 mi (6.1 km)
- Basin size: 4.49 sq mi (11.6 km^{2})

Basin features
- Progression: Lackawanna River → Susquehanna River → Chesapeake Bay
- Tributaries
  - right: West Branch Tinklepaugh Creek

Wildcat Creek (also known as Millers Creek, Tinklepaugh Creek, or Wild Cat Creek) is a tributary of the Lackawanna River in Lackawanna County, Pennsylvania, in the United States. It is approximately 3.8 miles (6.1 km) long and flows through Archbald and Blakely. The watershed of the creek has an area of 4.49 square miles (11.6 km^{2}). It has one named tributary, which is known as West Branch Tinklepaugh Creek. The creek may lose flow to coal measures and may receive only intermittent flow even at its source. Only the upper reaches of the creek have a natural channel. It flows through an open box culvert in its lower reaches.

The watershed of Wildcat Creek is mainly on residential and commercial land. The creek is a source of flooding in Archbald and Blakely. The creek's course was diverted at least once in the early 20th century and a bridge was constructed over it in the late 20th century. A trail along the creek between the Lackawanna River Heritage Trail and Archbald Pothole State Park has been proposed. The creek is designated as a Coldwater Fishery and a Migratory Fishery.

== Course ==
Wildcat Creek begins in a valley between Hibbard Mountain and Meyers Mountain in Archbald. It flows southeast for several tenths of a mile before leaving the water gap and crossing a highway. Near the Archbald Pothole, the creek turns south-southwest for approximately two miles, entering Blakely and receiving West Branch Tinklepaugh Creek, its only named tributary, from the right. Soon afterwards, the creek crosses Pennsylvania Route 247 and turns southeast. After a short distance, it turns southwest for a few tenths of a mile before reaching its confluence with the Lackawanna River.

Wildcat Creek joins the Lackawanna River 18.55 miles (29.85 km) upriver of its mouth.

=== Tributaries ===
Wildcat Creek has one named tributary, which is known as West Branch Tinklepaugh Creek. The watershed of West Branch Tinklepaugh Creek has an area of 1.49 square miles (3.9 km^{2}). Wildcat Creek also has an unnamed second-order tributary.

== Hydrology ==
At its mouth the peak annual discharge of Wildcat Creek has a 10 percent chance of reaching 1079 cubic feet per second. It has a 2 percent chance of reaching 2102 cubic feet per second and a 1 percent chance of reaching 2700 cubic feet per second. The peak annual discharge has a 0.2 percent chance of reaching 4020 cubic feet per second.

Upstream of the confluence of the tributary West Branch Tinklepaugh Creek, the peak annual discharge of Wildcat Creek has a 10 percent chance of reaching 814 cubic feet per second. It has a 2 percent chance of reaching 1632 cubic feet per second and a 1 percent chance of reaching 2188 cubic feet per second. The peak annual discharge has a 0.2 percent chance of reaching 3148 cubic feet per second.

In November 2000, Wildcat Creek was found to have no flow in any of its reaches. It may receive only intermittent flow from its source and may also lose flow to coal measures. Downstream of US Route 6, the creek contains sediment, stormwater, and runoff from culm piles and parking lots. This reach is described in the Lackawanna River Watershed Conservation Plan as "a sediment-choked, storm water ditch". A permit was once requested to discharge stormwater into the creek.

== Geography and geology ==
The elevation near the mouth of Wildcat Creek is 771 feet (235 m) above sea level. The elevation of the creek's source is between 1,540 and 1,560 feet (470 and 480 m) above sea level. The creek has a high gradient in a reach of its headwaters.

One reach of Wildcat Creek has been affected by channelization. Other reaches of the creek have been affected by urban development and mine rock. The only reach with natural conditions is a high-gradient reach near its headwaters. This reach is 0.6 miles (0.97 km) long and has a stable streambank. The headwaters of the creek are on rocky terrain with no wetlands. Within a few hundred feet of its headwaters, it flows through coal measures.

Downstream of US Route 6, Wildcat Creek is impacted by piles of culm on one of its banks and commercial land on the other bank. A stable streambank does not occur in this reach. The final mile (two kilometers) of the creek is in an open concrete box culvert surrounded by lawns and houses. The channel is fenced in this reach and there is no natural channel left.

Some ridges in the vicinity of Wildcat Creek contain an irregular covering consisting of glacial till. This glacial till mostly contains sand with 30 or 40 percent gravel. There are also some large boulders. Some of the ridges are made entirely from glacial till. A mountain is located in the western part of the watershed.

== Watershed ==
The watershed of Wildcat Creek has an area of 4.49 square miles (11.6 km^{2}). The mouth of the creek is in the United States Geological Survey quadrangle of Olyphant. However, its source is in the quadrangle of Carbondale. The watershed of the creek is in the central part of the watershed of the Lackawanna River.

Wildcat Creek is a third-order stream. The creek's watershed is mainly on residential and commercial land. However, in the late 20th century, the majority of the watershed was on forested land. Approximately 20 percent of the watershed contained residential development, most of which was located near the Lackawanna River. A small part of the watershed contained commercial development. Additionally, abandoned mining land is also in some areas of the watershed. There are few conservation opportunities for the lower reaches of the watershed.

Wildcat Creek is a source of flooding in Archbald and Blakely. Some property owners in Archbald have experienced basement flooding due to the creek.

== History and recreation ==
Wildcat Creek was entered into the Geographic Names Information System on August 2, 1979. Its identifier in the Geographic Names Information System is 1200060. The creek is also known as Wild Cat Creek, Millers Creek, or Tinklepaugh Creek.

In the early 20th century, the Hudson Coal Company altered the course of Wildcat Creek to Archbald. This was done to aid coal mining in the area. However, in the 1930s, they filed an application to the Water Power and Resources Board to divert back towards Jermyn. Nevertheless, the creek's mouth is currently in Blakely.

Wildcat Creek has a history of flooding within the borough of Archbald. A flooding event occurred on the creek in 1902. In one flood, it washed out a retaining wall made of stone and damaged several lots. It may be vulnerable to future flooding due to bank erosion.

A prestressed box beam or girders bridge carrying Main Street over Wildcat Creek was built in 1991. It is 24.0 feet (7.3 m) long and is situated in Blakely. The final mile of the creek was reconstructed in an open box culvert between 1994 and 1997.

In the early 2000s, the Lackawanna River Watershed Conservation Plan recommended that the boroughs of Blakely and Archbald include protection of Wildcat Creek in their zoning plans. The remains of the rail corridor of a spur of the New York, Ontario and Western Railway have the potential to be converted into a rail trail along Wildcat Creek, linking Archbald Pothole State Park to the Lackawanna River Heritage Trail.

== Biology ==
The drainage basin of Wildcat Creek is designated as a Coldwater Fishery and a Migratory Fishery.

In its upper reaches, there are native trees and understory plants along Wildcat Creek. Further downstream, there are some successional plants along its banks, but most of its riparian buffer is either bare or made of concrete. The creek lacks a riparian area in its lower reaches.

== See also ==
- Hull Creek (Lackawanna River), next tributary of the Lackawanna River going downriver
- Sterry Creek, next tributary of the Lackawanna River going upriver
- List of rivers of Pennsylvania
- List of tributaries of the Lackawanna River
