= Eddy Creek (Lackawanna River tributary) =

River in United States of America

Physical characteristics
- Source
  - location: near Pennsylvania Route 247 in Olyphant, Lackawanna County, Pennsylvania
  - elevation: between 1,720 and 1,740 feet (520 and 530 m)
- Mouth
  - location: Lackawanna River in Olyphant, Lackawanna County, Pennsylvania
  - coordinates: 41°27′49″N 75°36′38″W
  - elevation: 758 ft (231 m)
- Length: 5.7 mi (9.2 km)
- Basin size: 7.53 sq mi (19.5 km^{2})

Basin features
- Progression: Lackawanna River → Susquehanna River → Chesapeake Bay

Eddy Creek is a tributary of the Lackawanna River in Lackawanna County, Pennsylvania, in the United States. It is approximately 5.7 miles (9.2 km) long and flows through Olyphant and Throop. The watershed of the creek has an area of 7.53 square miles (19.5 km^{2}). The creek experiences serious flow loss and is considered to be impaired. It has a natural channel in some reaches, but its channel disappears in other reaches. Rock formations in the creek's vicinity include the Catskill Formation and the Llewellyn Formation. The creek is a second-order stream.

A bridge carrying Pennsylvania Route 347 across Eddy Creek was built in the 20th century. More recently, a restoration of 3.5 miles (5.6 km) of the creek has been planned. The creek is designated as a Warmwater Fishery and a Migratory Fishery. A greenway/connecting trail in the vicinity of the creek was proposed in the early 2000s in the Lackawanna River Watershed Conservation Plan.

== Course ==
Eddy Creek begins near Pennsylvania Route 247 in Olyphant, not far from the border of Jessup. It flows west for several tenths of a mile before turning southwest and then north. After a short distance, the creek for several tenths of a mile before turning southwest. A few tenths of a mile further downstream, it turns west-northwest and enters Throop. The creek crosses US Route 6 and turns west-southwest and then west. After some distance, it turns north for several tenths of a mile before turning northwest for some distance. The creek then turns west for a short distance before tuning north and then north-northeast, reentering Olyphant and receiving an unnamed tributary from the right. It then turns northwest and crosses Pennsylvania Route 347 before reaching its confluence with the Lackwanna River after a few tenths of a mile.

Eddy Creek joins the Lackawanna River 16.84 miles (27.10 km) upriver of its mouth.

=== Tributaries ===
Eddy Creek has no named tributaries. However, a 1916 book stated that several small streams discharged into the creek in its upper reaches. At the time, these streams had clear water, but were dry in the summer.

== Hydrology ==
Eddy Creek experiences total flow loss. Some reaches of the creek have been entirely destroyed by historical mining or by post-mining development. The creek loses all of its flow at 1,100 to 1,200 feet (340 to 370 m) above sea level via infiltration into mines. However, a near-constant flow is restored further downstream by stormwater from the Keystone Sanitary Landfill. It also has extensive deposits of culm and silt left over from mining. The creek is considered to be impaired by flow alterations. The likely source of the impairment is abandoned mine drainage.

Eddy Creek used to have flow, but has turned into a "leaky slow trickle" that carries acid mine drainage. In 2014, Joseph D'Onofrio, a senior engineering technician for GTS Technologies, compared the creek to an "old perforated pipe". Eddy Creek is an ephemeral stream.

The electrical conductivity of Eddy Creek was once measured to be 203.50 micro-siemens per centimeter. The concentration of total dissolved solids was measured to be 140 milligrams per liter and the concentration of dissolved oxygen was 66.50 percent. The pH of the creek was 6.99, and the concentration of salinity was 100 parts per million.

In the early 1900s, Eddy Creek lacked culm deposits at its mouth. However, its water was colored yellow by sulfur at that location. Further upstream, two pipes discharged mine water into the creek. One of these pipes had reddish water. However, upstream of an ash dump on the creek, the water was clear.

== Geography, geology, and climate ==
The elevation near the mouth of Eddy Creek is 758 feet (231 m) above sea level. The elevation of the creek's source is between 1,720 and 1,740 feet (520 and 530 m) above sea level.

At one point, Eddy Creek flows through a restored channel at a reclaimed mining site. Further downstream, the creek flows through its natural channel and cuts across a number of rock ledges. However, by the time it crosses US Route 6, it has lost its flow. Nevertheless, its channel is still discernible and its gradient is shallower. The creek loses its channel completely at the intersection of an electric transmission corridor and the Eddy Creek Mine Tunnel. It eventually reappears, but disappears again in strip pits and sinks. From Birds Eye Mine to Underwood Road, the stream channel has been completely destroyed. The creek has an engineered channel in one reach where it passes through a residential area.

The streambed of Eddy Creek is dry in some reaches. Its banks are steep and contain riprap and concrete headwalls. A total of 20 percent of the land in the creek's vicinity is on impervious surfaces. The creek flows through one pipe. Its size is 84 inches (210 cm).

The headwaters of Eddy Creek are in springs and wetlands in the vicinity of Marshwood, near the edge of Moosic Mountain.

Sandstones and coals of the Llewellyn Formation are located in the watershed of Eddy Creek. Some drift is located near the creek and reddish shale and sandstone of the Catskill Formation can be seen in this area.

In early October 2013, the temperature in the vicinity of Eddy Creek was found to be 68 °F (20 °C). The water temperature of the creek was found to be 23.42 °C (74.16 °F) in a 2013 study.

== Watershed ==
The watershed of Eddy Creek has an area of 7.53 square miles (19.5 km^{2}). The creek is entirely within the United States Geological Survey quadrangle of Olyphant.

A waterfall or morphologic site known as the Marshwood Slides is in the watershed of Eddy Creek. Wetlands in the watershed include the Dunmore Swamps and Marshwood. The Marshwood Reservoir is located in the upper reaches of both the Eddy Creek watershed and the Little Roaring Brook watershed. Eddy Creek flows through forested land in a reach downstream of US Route 6. Other land uses include industrial land and open space.

Neighborhoods in the vicinity of Eddy Creek include the Keystone Industrial Park, the Keystone Sanitary Landfill, and LaCapra Stone & Supply. It is estimated that there is one stormwater detention facility in the watershed. According to a 1992 report, development in an area near the creek would have little adverse impact on the creek.

In a visual assessment of six tributaries of the Lackawanna River in 2013, Eddy Creek received the lowest visual assessment score, 100 on a scale from 0 to 200. This was within the "marginal" range of 56 to 105. The creek received the lowest score in seven categories: instream cover, epifaunal substrate, embeddedness, velocity/depth regimes, sediment deposits, riffle frequency, and channel flow status.

Eddy Creek is a second-order, mid-sized stream.

== History ==
Eddy Creek was entered into the Geographic Names Information System on August 2, 1979. Its identifier in the Geographic Names Information System is 1198695.

Historically, two breakers known as the Eddy Creek Shaft and the No. 2 Shaft were situated on the banks of Eddy Creek. In the late 1800s, a mine fire started in the No. 2 Shaft. As a last resort, water from Eddy Creek and the Lackawanna River were used in an attempt to extinguish it. Historically, there was a dam on the creek. The dam was owned by the Delaware and Hudson Company and was used for impounding water to flush ashes from a power plant. The creek also supplied water for a washery at the Underwood Colliery.

A concrete culvert bridge carrying Pennsylvania Route 347 was built over Eddy Creek in 2008. It is 24.0 feet (7.3 m) long and is situated in Olyphant. A number of historic sites are located in the watershed of Eddy Creek. These include the South Valley Arch, which is in Olyphant, and the DL&W Pancost Arch, the DL&W Winton Arch, and the Erie Arch, which are all in Throop. The Hudson Coal mine railroad, a narrow gauge railroad that operated until 1959, shared a culvert under South Valley Avenue with the creek. The borough of Throop once requested a permit to discharge stormwater into the creek.

As of the early 2000s, the Bureau of Abandoned Mine Reclamation has been restoring the stream corridor and channel of Eddy Creek. In the early 2000s, it was expected that 3.5 miles (5.6 km) of the creek would be reclaimed by 2006. As of 2014, there were plans to restore 3.5 miles (5.6 km) of the creek, starting in Spring 2015 and ending in December 2015. The project would span 169 acres (68 ha) of territory and feature regrading 30 properties. Three wetlands and two bat habitats will be affected, but no historic or archaeological sites will be, and the flow of the Lackawanna River will not be impacted.

== Biology ==
The drainage basin of Eddy Creek is a Warmwater Fishery and a Migratory Fishery.

Some areas of the riparian buffer of Eddy Creek contain woody herbaceous plants. Strip mine overburden piles covered in forests also occur in the creek's riparian area.

Eddy Creek was described as a "low-quality aquatic resource" in a 1992 report.

== Recreation ==
In the early 2000s, the Lackawanna River Watershed Conservation Plan recommended the creation of a greenway/connecting trail along Eddy Creek. Such a trail could link the campus of the Mid Valley School District to the Lackawanna River Heritage Trail at the mouth of the creek.

== See also ==
- Price Creek (Pennsylvania), next tributary of the Lackawanna River going downriver
- Hull Creek (Lackawanna River), next tributary of the Lackawanna River going upriver
- List of rivers of Pennsylvania
- List of tributaries of the Lackawanna River
