= Hull Creek (Lackawanna River tributary) =

River in northeast Pennsylvania

Hull Creek Hulls Creek
- Location within the United States Location within Pennsylvania

Physical characteristics
- Source
  - location: pond in Scott Township, Lackawanna County, Pennsylvania
  - elevation: between 1,560 and 1,580 feet (475.5 and 481.6 m)
- Mouth
  - location: Lackawanna River in Dickson City, Lackawanna County, Pennsylvania
  - coordinates: 41°28′13″N 75°36′26″W
  - elevation: 755 ft (230 m)
- Length: 4.1 mi (6.6 km)
- Basin size: 3.22 sq mi (8.3 km^{2})

Basin features
- Progression: Lackawanna River → Susquehanna River → Chesapeake Bay

Hull Creek (also known as Hulls Creek) is a tributary of the Lackawanna River in Lackawanna County, Pennsylvania, in the United States. It is approximately 4.1 miles (6.6 km) long and flows through Scott Township, Blakely, and Dickson City. The watershed of the creek has an area of 3.22 square miles (8.3 km^{2}). The creek is considered to be impaired by habitat alteration. It is a perennial stream, but experiences some flow loss. A waterfall system known as the Blakely Falls are on the creek, in a post-glacial valley. It also flows through a deep water gap. Channelization work was done on the creek in 1975 by the Pennsylvania Department of Environmental Resources, which has had the effect of reducing flooding.

Hull Creek is a second-order stream with some wetlands in its watershed. Its relatively narrow watershed occupies parts of Scott Township, Blakely, Archbald, and Dickson City. Several flooding events have occurred on Hull Creek. The creek is designated as a Coldwater Fishery and a Migratory Fishery. In 2013, it received a habitat assessment score of 159 on a scale of 0 to 200. Macroinvertebrate taxa such as mayflies (Ephemeroptera), stoneflies (Plecoptera), and caddis flies (Trichoptera) inhabit the creek as well.

== Course ==
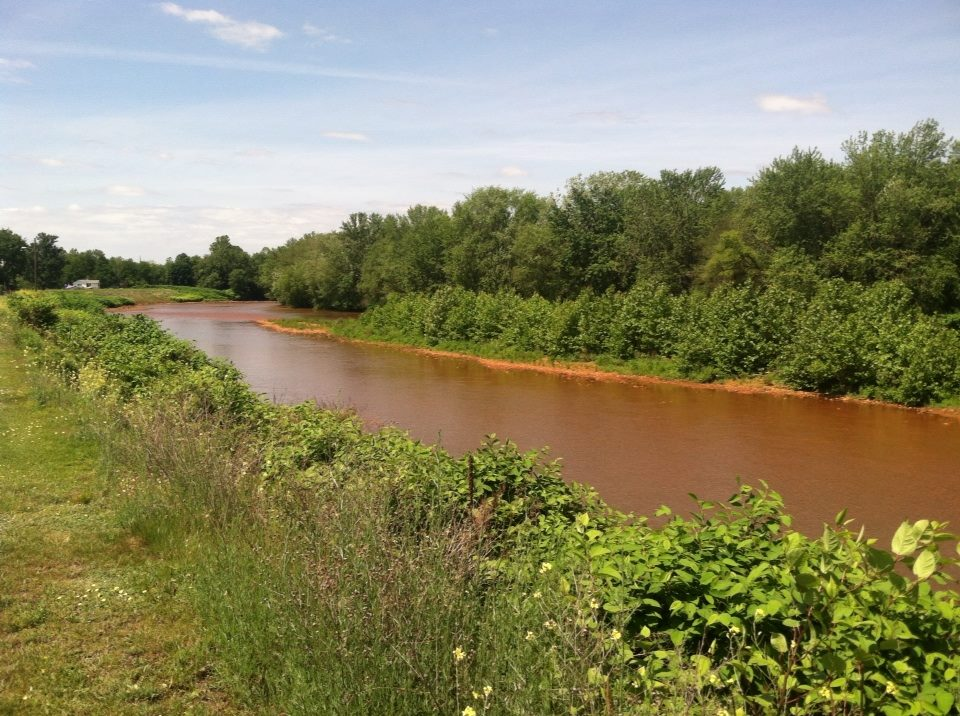
Lackawanna River, into which the Hull Creek flows

Hull Creek begins in a pond in Scott Township. It flows south-southwest for more than a mile before turning south. Several tenths of a mile further downstream, the creek turns south-southeast, flowing through a water gap alongside Pennsylvania Route 347 and entering Blakely. After several tenths of a mile, the creek crosses a highway and flows south-southwest in a much smaller valley. After some distance, it enters Dickson City and reaches its confluence with the Lackawanna River.

Hull Creek joins the Lackawanna River 17.56 miles (28.26 km) upriver of its mouth.

=== Tributaries ===
Hull Creek has no named tributaries. However, it does have one unnamed tributary, which joins the creek near its headwaters.

== Hydrology ==
Hull Creek is considered to be an impaired waterbody. The cause of the impairment is habitat alteration and the probable source of the impairment is channelization. Additionally, runoff from Pennsylvania Route 347 and residential properties impacts the water quality of the creek in Blakely. The creek loses flow to underground mines. Hull Creek is a perennial stream.

A 2013 study found the electrical conductivity of Hull Creek to range from 179.50 to 679.00 micro-Siemens per centimeter, with an average of 283.45 micro-Siemens per centimeter. Only the maximum value was outside of the ideal range. The creek was found to be slightly alkaline, with a pH ranging from 6.82 to 8.07. The average pH of the creek was 7.60 and only the maximum value was outside of the ideal range. The concentration of total dissolved solids ranged from 50.00 to 490.00 milligrams per liter, with an average of 167.81 milligrams per liter. Only the maximum value was outside of the ideal range.

The dissolved oxygen levels in Hull Creek ranged from 30.80 to 249.02 percent, with an average of 115.69 percent. The average value was within the ideal range, but the minimum and maximum values were not. The concentration of salinity in the creek ranges from 70.95 to 310.00 parts per million, with an average concentration of 136.37 parts per million. All values were within the ideal range.

At its mouth, the peak annual discharge of Hull Creek has a 10 percent chance of reaching 580 cubic feet per second. It has a 2 percent chance of reaching 1260 cubic feet per second and a 1 percent chance of reaching 1690 cubic feet per second. The peak annual discharge has a 0.2 percent chance of reaching 3460 cubic feet per second.

At the border between Scott Township and Blakely, the peak annual discharge of Hull Creek as a 1 percent chance of reaching 780 cubic feet per second. Upstream of Green Grove Road, it has a 1 percent chance of reaching 710 cubic feet per second. At a private bridge approximately 2,600 feet (790 m) upstream of Green Grove Road, the peak annual discharge has a 1 percent chance of reaching 430 cubic feet per second.

A mid-20th-century report estimated the volume of surface seepage into mine workings at Hull Creek was 9.53 gallons per minute per inch of rainfall. The rate of streambed seepage in the area was estimated to be 17.02 gallons per minute per inch of rainfall. The rate of seepage is much higher than a number of other streams in the area.

== Geography, geology, and climate ==
The elevation near the mouth of Hull Creek is 755 feet (230 m) above sea level. The elevation of the creek's source is between 1,560 and 1,580 feet (475.5 and 481.6 m) above sea level.

One of the more prominent waterfalls in the watershed of the Lackawanna River, the Blakely Falls, are on Hull Creek. The Blakely Falls are a "picturesque" post-glacial gorge cut through sandstone of the lower Llewellyn Formation. The waterfalls on the creek are downstream of US Route 6. For 0.3 miles (0.48 km) after the waterfall, the creek has a high gradient, with rock ledges, plunge pools, and slides. The headwaters of the creek are in a wetland pond. In the reach near Pennsylvania Route 347, it has a relatively steep gradient and rock ledges are present along it. Heavy erosion and overburden piles are present along the creek further downstream.

Channelization work was done on 1 mile (1.6 km) of Hull Creek in Blakely by the Pennsylvania Department of Environmental Resources in 1975. This project has substantially reduced flooding. Streambank stabilization projects have been carried out along it in Blakely. The creek is also impacted by historic mining operations downstream of a branch of US Route 6. Upstream of that highway, however, it is relatively undisturbed. The creek flows through an open concrete box culvert in its lower reaches. The culvert becomes closed for its last several hundred feet, downstream to the mouth.

A mid-20th-century report found that 0.901 square miles (2.33 km^{2}) of the watershed of Hull Creek was on coal measures. A total of 6,800 feet (2,100 m) of the creek's length was on coal measures. The banks of the creek contain glacial drift, with culm pile debris and eroded material. These materials are picked up by the stream, but the load is too heavy for it to carry, leading to the material to be deposited further downstream, reducing the capacity of the channel.

Hull Creek flows through a deep water gap in the Lackawanna synclinorium. The water gap's upper walls contain conglomerate of the Pottsville Formation. However, the floor of the gap instead has a layer of glacial till with a thickness of 50 to 100 feet (15 to 30 m). The creek also flows through a narrow gorge in the Lackawanna Valley. This gorge is cut through bedrock instead of glacial till. At least three coal beds along the creek have been mined. These are likely the New County Bed, the Dunmore No. 1 Bed, and the Clark Bed.

The preglacial valley of Hull Creek is now buried. It has been described as "one of the best examples of a preglacial valley buried by glacial deposits". The preglacial course flowed through the water gap in a similar manner as its modern course, but at that point turned to the south instead of flowing along its present course.

In a 2013 study, the water temperature of Hull Creek was found to range from 2.17 to 21.64 °C (35.91 to 70.95 °F). The average temperature was 11.34 °C (52.41 °F). The minimum and maximum temperatures were out of the ideal range, but the average temperature was in the ideal range.

== Watershed ==
The watershed of Hull Creek has an area of 3.22 square miles (8.3 km^{2}). The part of the watershed that is upstream of the border between Blakely and Scott Township has an area of 2.26 square miles (5.9 km^{2}). The mouth of the creek is in the United States Geological Survey quadrangle of Olyphant. However, its source is in the quadrangle of Dalton. The creek also passes through the quadrangle of Carbondale. The creek's watershed is mostly in Scott Township and Blakely. However, small parts of it are in Dickson City and Archbald.

Hull Creek is a second-order stream. Its watershed is relatively narrow. In the upper reaches of the creek's watershed, residential areas are sparse and tend to be somewhat removed from the creek itself. In Blakely, it follows Pennsylvania Route 347 closely and crosses it several times. A gas line crosses the creek upstream of US Route 6. There are several patches of wetlands in the watershed's upper reaches, and two more in the middle and lower reaches. Upstream of Blakely, the watershed contains forested land and pastures on a rolling plateau.

Hull Creek is a source of flooding in Scott Township. It has also had a history of flooding in Blakely, although a flood control project was installed there in 1975. However, large floods in Scott Township have still caused local inundation of structures along the creek.

== History ==
Hull Creek was entered into the Geographic Names Information System on October 1, 1992. Its identifier in the Geographic Names Information System is 1214683.

Severe flooding events occurred on Hull Creek in July 1920 and May 1942. However, the most severe flood occurred on May 21, 1947.

In the early 2000s, the Lackawanna River Watershed Conservation Plan recommended that Scott Township, Blakely, and Dickson City include protection of Hull Creek in their zoning plans. The rehabilitation of a bridge carrying State Route 1029 over the creek in Scott Township was once planned.

== Biology ==
The drainage basin of Hull Creek is designated as a Coldwater Fishery and a Migratory Fishery.

In southern Scott Township, Hull Creek is flanked by native trees and understory. However, further downstream, in Blakely, there is virtually no riparian buffer. Beyond this reach, the creek's riparian buffer again contains native trees and understory.

At three sites on Hull Creek, the EPT (Ephemeroptera, Plecoptera, and Trichoptera) Taxa Richness ranged from 4.00 to 16.00 in a 2013 study. The Total Taxa Richness ranged from 7.00 to 24.00. The Taxa Richness and the EPT Taxa Richness are the total number of macroinvertebrate taxa observed in a sample and the total number of those taxa that are in the three aforementioned orders, respectively. The Percent Intolerance Index ranged from 2.5% to 53% and the Beck's Index value ranged from 10.00 to 26.00. These two methods count individuals with PTVs of 0 to 3 and taxa with PTVs of 0 to 2, respectively. The Hilsenhoff Biotic Index value ranged from 0.28 to 2.70 and the Shannon Diversity Index value ranged from 1.45 to 2.05. The former is a method of determining community composition by considering both taxonomic richness and evenness of individuals. The latter is a count of individuals, weighted by pollution tolerance. The IBI Score of the creek ranged from 38.79 to 74.96.

In the 2013 study, Hull Creek received a habitat assessment score of 159 on a scale of 0 to 200. This puts it barely into the "optimal" zone (156 to 200).

== See also ==
- Eddy Creek (Lackawanna River), next tributary of the Lackawanna River going downriver
- Wildcat Creek (Lackawanna River), next tributary of the Lackawanna River going upriver
- List of rivers of Pennsylvania
- List of tributaries of the Lackawanna River
