= Lackawanna River =

Lackawanna River Gachanai, Hazirok L'chau-hanne, Lackawannok, Lechau-hanné, Lechau-hannek, Lechauwah-hannek.
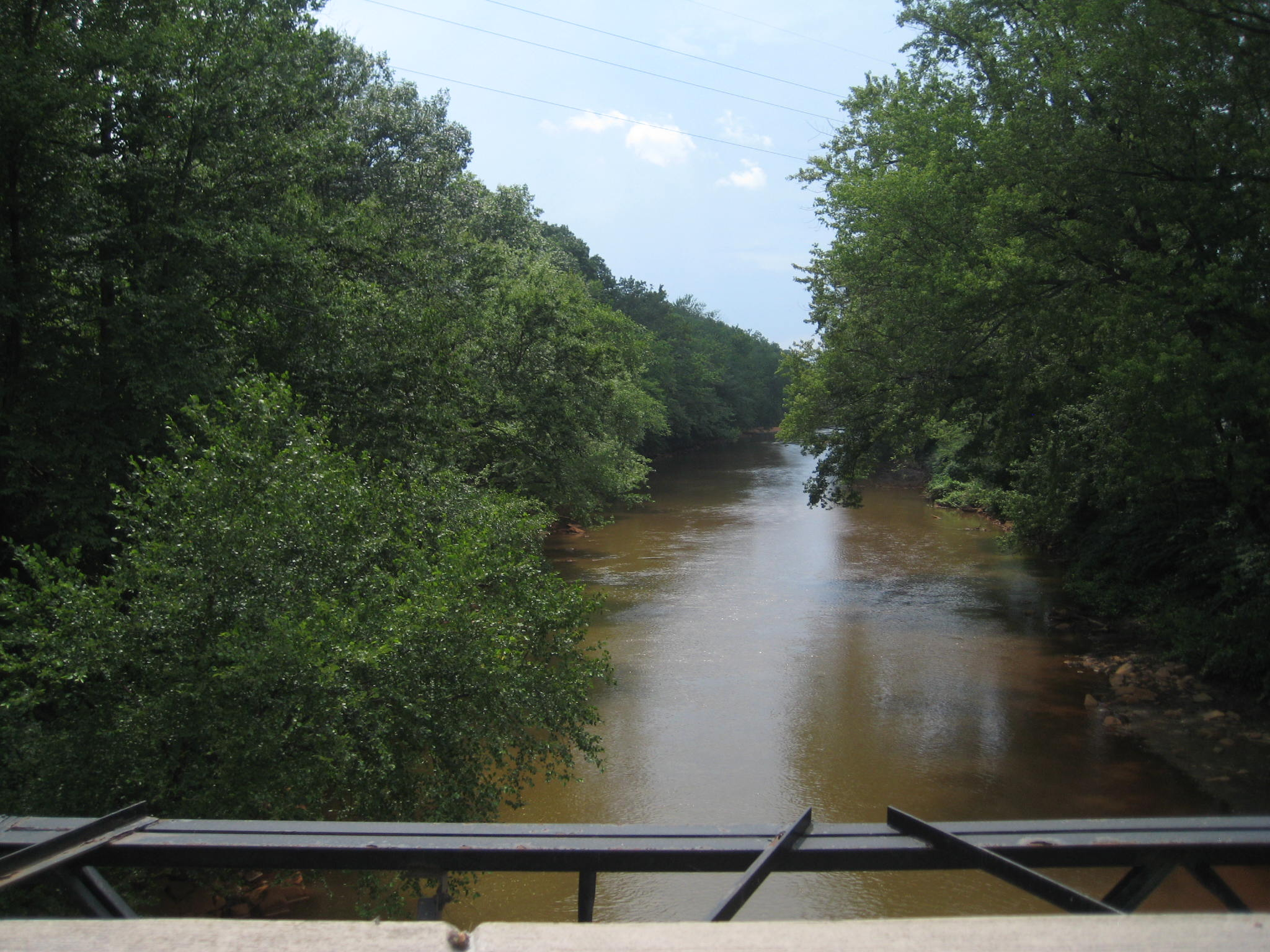
- Lackawanna River as seen from Coxton Road Bridge, looking towards the Lackawanna-Susquehanna confluence

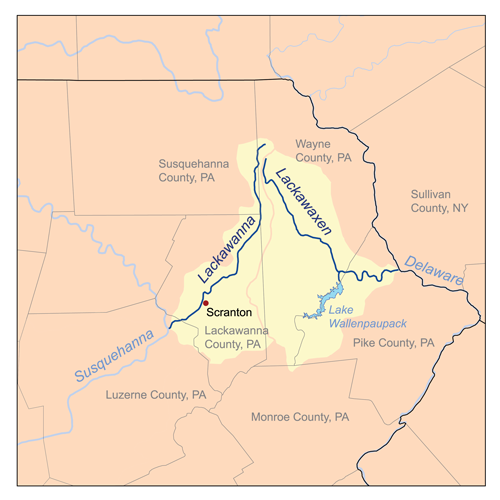
- The watersheds of the Lackawanna and Lackawaxen Rivers
- Etymology: Lenape word Lechauwa-hannek meaning "the river that forks"

Location
- Country: United States
- State: Pennsylvania
- Counties: Lackawanna, Luzerne, Susquehanna, and Wayne Counties

Physical characteristics
- Source: Confluence of east and west branch
  - elevation: 1,341 ft (409 m)
- 2nd source
  - location: East Branch: Bone Pond, Dunn Pond, Independent Lake, Lake Lorain
  - elevation: East Branch: 1,572 ft (479 m)
- 3rd source
  - location: West Branch: Fiddle Lake, Lewis Lake, Lake Lowe
  - elevation: West Branch: 1,575 ft (480 m)
- Mouth
  - location: Susquehanna River (North Branch)
  - coordinates: 41°20′28″N 75°47′35″W
  - elevation: 540 ft (160 m)
- Length: 42 mi (68 km)
- Basin size: 350 sq mi (910 km^{2})

Basin features
- Tributaries
  - right: Roaring Brook

The Lackawanna River is a 42-mile-long (68 km) tributary of the Susquehanna River in Northeastern Pennsylvania. It flows through a region of the northern Pocono Mountains that was once a center of anthracite coal mining in the United States. It starts in north Wayne County, Pennsylvania and ends in east Luzerne County, Pennsylvania in Duryea, Pennsylvania. The lower reaches of the river flow through the urban areas of Scranton, which grew around its banks in the 19th century as an industrial center. Its name comes from a Lenape word meaning "stream that forks".

The river rises in two branches, the West and East branches, along the boundary between Susquehanna and Wayne counties. The branches, each about 12 miles (19 km) long, flow south, closely parallel to each other, and join at the Stillwater Lake reservoir in Union Dale. The combined river flows southwest past Forest City, Carbondale, Mayfield, Jermyn, Archbald, Jessup, Blakely, Olyphant, Dickson City, Throop, Scranton, Taylor, Moosic, Old Forge, and Duryea. It joins the Susquehanna River at the northern boundary of Pittston about 8 miles (13 km) west-southwest of Scranton. As part of the Susquehanna River, it ultimately flows to the Chesapeake Bay.

By the mid-20th century, the river was severely polluted from mine drainages in its watershed. The decline of industry in the region, as well as federal, state, and private efforts, have improved the water quality. Still, the Lackawanna River is the largest point source of pollution in the Chesapeake Bay. The upper reaches of the river are a popular destination for fly fishing of trout. It was designated as an American Heritage River in 1997.

== Course ==
The Lackawanna River begins at the confluence of the East Branch Lackawanna River and the West Branch Lackawanna River in Stillwater Lake in Clifford Township, Susquehanna County. It flows south-southeast for a few miles in a deep valley, crossing Pennsylvania Route 171 and passing through Forest City. The river then enters Clinton Township, Wayne County. Here, it flows south for more than a mile before turning southeast for several tenths of a mile. It then turns south-southwest for a few miles, meandering into Vandling, in Lackawanna County. The river only flows through Vandling for a few tenths of a mile before entering Fell Township. The western side of its valley becomes steeper again and the river continues meandering south-southwest for a while before turning west for several tenths of a mile and into Simpson, where its valley broadens again. In Simpson, it turns southwest and crosses Pennsylvania Route 171 again before receiving the tributary Wilson Creek from the right.

After receiving the tributary Wilson Creek, the Lackawanna River continues flowing southwest alongside Pennsylvania Route 171 and soon enters Carbondale. After flowing for several tenths of a mile through Carbondale, the river turns south for a few tenths of a mile, receiving the tributary Racket Brook from the left and crossing Pennsylvania Route 106 and a spur of US Route 6. It then turns west-southwest for several tenths of a mile and receives the tributary Fall Brook from the right before turning southwest for several miles. In this reach, the river passes through Carbondale Township and enters Mayfield. It eventually enters Jermyn, where it crosses Pennsylvania Route 107 and receives the tributary Rush Brook from the right. The river then turns south for a few miles, receiving the tributary Aylesworth Creek from the left and entering Archbald. In Archbald, it continues flowing south, receiving the tributaries White Oak Run and Laurel Run from the left. Several tenths of a mile downstream of the latter tributary, it enters Jessup and turns abruptly west.

After flowing west for several tenths of a mile, the Lackawanna River receives the tributary Grassy Island Creek from the left and continues flowing in a generally westerly direction for several miles. The river begins flowing along the border between Blakely and Olyphant. In this reach, it crosses Pennsylvania Route 247 and receives the tributaries Sterry Creek and Wildcat Creek from the left and right, respectively. Further downstream, the river crosses Pennsylvania Route 347 and receives the tributary Hull Creek from the right. It then begins flowing in a southwesterly direction along the border between Olyphant and Dickson City, though it makes several sharp turns along the way. After some distance, it receives the tributary Eddy Creek from the left and begins flowing along the border between Dickson City and Throop. After a few miles, the river enters Scranton and crosses US Route 6/Interstate 81. It then turns south for several tenths of a mile, receiving the tributary Leggetts Creek from the right before turning southwest. After a few tenths of a mile, it abruptly turns north, and then west-southwest before turning south. After more than a mile, it crosses US Route 11/Pennsylvania Route 307 and passes the Steamtown National Historic Site before turning south and receiving the tributary Roaring Brook from the left.

After receiving the tributary Roaring Brook, the Lackawanna River flows in a southwesterly direction for several miles, alternating between flowing south and flowing west. In this reach, it receives the tributary Stafford Meadow Brook from the left and eventually begins flowing along the border between Scranton and Taylor before receiving Keyser Creek from the right and beginning to flow alongside the border between Taylor and Moosic. After some distance along the latter border, the river crosses Interstate 476 and turns south, now flowing along the border between Old Forge and Moosic. After more than a mile, it begins meandering west, receiving Spring Brook and Mill Creek. Several tenths of a mile further downstream, it receives the tributary Saint Johns Creek from the right and turns west-southwest. After several tenths of a mile, the river exits Lackawanna County and enters Duryea, in Luzerne County. It continues flowing west-southwest through Duryea for a few miles before reaching the border between Duryea and Pittston. The river flows along this border for the remaining several tenths of a mile to its confluence with the Susquehanna River.

The Lackawanna River joins the Susquehanna River 196.30 miles (315.91 km) upriver of its mouth.

=== Tributaries ===
The Lackawanna River has 33 named direct tributaries and another 32 sub-tributaries and sub-sub-tributaries. Of the eight tributaries that drain an area of more than 10 square miles (26 km^{2}), Spring Brook and Roaring Brook are the largest, with watersheds than drain 57.2 square miles (148 km^{2}) and 56.3 square miles (146 km^{2}), respectively. They join the Lackawanna River 3.62 miles (5.83 km) and 9.52 miles (15.32 km), respectively. The East Branch Lackawanna River drains an area of 19.0 square miles (49 km^{2}) and joins the Lackawanna River 40.32 miles (64.89 km) upriver of its mouth. Leggetts Creek drains an area of 18.5 square miles (48 km^{2}) and joins the river 14.36 miles (23.11 km) upriver of its mouth. The West Branch Lackawanna River drains an area of 16.8 square miles (44 km^{2}) and joins the river 40.32 miles (64.89 km) upriver of its mouth. Other tributaries that drain an area of more than 10 square miles (26 km^{2}) include Stafford Meadow Brook, Fall Brook, and Mill Creek.

== Hydrology ==
The Lackawanna River and its tributaries are in "good-to-excellent" condition in its upper reaches. The river deteriorates slightly as it approaches Scranton, but becomes considerably more degraded downriver of Scranton. A large number of mine seeps, outfalls, and boreholes occur within the watershed. The aquatic habitat in the last 3 miles (4.8 km) is nonexistent due to acid mine drainage from the Old Forge Borehole, which discharges 100 million gallons of acid mine drainage into the river every day. Another 40 million gallons of acid mine drainage per day come from the Duryea Outfall. Other impacts include combined sewer overflows and urban stormwater. The stormwater discharges begin to become more common as the river reaches the Mid Valley region, and their frequency rapidly increases in the Down Valley region. The lower 3 miles (4.8 km) have a yellow-orange color due to iron oxide contamination. There are a total of 158 combined sewer overflows on the river.

Several reaches of the Lackawanna River have been designated as impaired between 1996 and 2004. The causes of impairment include pH, metals, siltation, and flow alteration. The source of impairment include abandoned mine drainage and resource extraction.

The Lackawanna River has a perennial flow. Nevertheless, it experiences low flow conditions during warm weather. The discharge of the river near Forest City was observed to range from 3904.83 to 69,568.83 gallons per minute, with an average of 35,584.83 gallons per minute. The river's discharge near Archbald ranged from 3976.60 to 323,158.40 gallons per minute, with an average of 97,130.90 gallons per minute. Below the Broadway Street Bridge, it ranged from 34,560 to 586,397 gallons per minute and averaged 222,732.46 gallons per minute. Near Coxton Road, the discharge averaged 266,478 gallons per minute.

=== Chemical hydrology ===
In 2002, the concentration of iron in the Lackawanna River near Forest City was less than 0.3 milligrams per liter. The manganese concentration ranged from less than 0.05 to 0.175 milligrams per liter, with an average of 0.1103 milligrams per liter. The concentration of aluminum ranged from less than 0.5 to 0.692 milligrams per liter, with an average of 0.6255 milligrams per liter. The pH ranged from 6.1 to 7.4 (with an average of 6.7), the acidity concentration ranged from 0 to 10.4 milligrams per liter (with an average of 1.73 milligrams per liter), and the alkalinity concentration ranged from 16.4 to 32 milligrams per liter (with an average of 22.3 milligrams per liter). The sulfate concentration ranged from less than 20 to 30.7 milligrams per liter, with an average of 28.4 milligrams per liter.

The iron concentration in the Lackawanna River near Archbald ranged from less than 0.3 to 0.794 milligrams per liter, with an average of 0.5 milligrams per liter. The amount of manganese ranged from less than 0.083 to 0.16 milligrams per liter, with an average of 0.12 milligrams per liter. The amount of aluminum ranged from 0.4 to 0.742 milligrams per liter, with an average of 0.57 milligrams per liter. The pH ranged between 6.5 and 7.2, with an average of 6.7. The concentration of acidity was 0 milligrams per liter and the alkalinity concentration ranged from 17 to 38 milligrams per liter (with an average of 27.57 milligrams per liter). The sulfate concentration ranged from less than 20 to 136 milligrams per liter, with an average of 59.55 milligrams per liter.

The amount of iron in the Lackawanna River below the Broadway Street Bridge was typically less than 0.3 milligrams per liter, but once reached 0.348 milligrams per liter. The manganese concentration ranged from less than 0.067 to 0.139 milligrams per liter, with an average of 0.09 milligrams per liter. The aluminum concentration ranged from less than 0.5 to 0.753 milligrams per liter, with an average concentration of 0.63 milligrams per liter. The pH of the river at this point ranged from 6.7 to 7.3 (with an average of 6.95) and the acidity concentration was 0 milligrams per liter. The alkalinity concentration ranged from 19 to 36 milligrams per liter (with an average of 28.17 milligrams per liter). The concentration of sulfate ranged from less than 30.5 to 66.8 milligrams per liter, with an average of 46.25 milligrams per liter.

The iron concentration in the Lackawanna River near Coxton Road ranged from less than 1.21 to 10.5 milligrams per liter, with an average of 3.98 milligrams per liter. The amount of manganese ranged from less than 0.199 to 1.35 milligrams per liter, with an average of 0.67 milligrams per liter. The aluminum concentration ranged from less than 0.5 to 0.664 milligrams per liter. The pH ranged between 6.5 and 6.7, with an average of 6.58. The acidity concentration was typically 0, but once reached 15.4 milligrams per liter. The alkalinity concentration ranged from 24 to 68 milligrams per liter (with an average of 44.37 milligrams per liter). The sulfate concentration ranged from 30.2 to 221 milligrams per liter, with an average of 104.78 milligrams per liter.

Between the upper Carbondale city line and Green Ridge Street, the concentration of alkalinity in various reaches of the Lackawanna River ranges from 14 to 34 milligrams per liter. The lowest concentration occurs in the reach from the Mellow Park Foot Bridge to Pennsylvania Route 347 and the highest concentration occurs in the reach from Pennsylvania Route 347 to Green Ridge Street.

== Geography and geology ==
The elevation near the mouth of the Lackawanna River is 522 feet (159 m) above sea level. The elevation of the river's source is between 1,560 and 1,580 feet (480 and 480 m) above sea level. The river is steep and sometimes narrow. Its average gradient between Forest City and Pittston is 19 feet per mile (3.6 m/km). For its first 13 miles (21 km), the river's average gradient is 45.4 feet per mile (8.60 m/km). For the next 15 miles (24 km), the average gradient is 20 feet per mile (3.8 m/km). For the final 12 miles (19 km), the gradient of the river averages 13.2 feet per mile (2.50 m/km).

In general, the topography of the Lackawanna River watershed consists of long, steep-sided ridges with valleys in between. The headwaters of the river are in a group of glacial ponds and bogs in Susquehanna County and Wayne County, about 12 miles (19 km) north of Forest City. The river itself begins at Stillwater Lake, which was built by the United States Army Corps of Engineers in 1960. For much of its length, the river flows through the Lackawanna Valley, which runs in a northeast-to-southwest direction. Many tributaries flow into the Lackawanna River from West Mountain, the Moosic Mountains, or the Pocono Mountains.

The headwaters of the Lackawanna River are in the glaciated plateau physiographic province of the Appalachian Mountains. However, the Lackawanna Valley is in the northernmost part of the ridge and valley physiographic province. The river also flows through a portion of the Coal Region. The Lackawanna Valley is part of the Lackawanna/Wyoming Syncline, which is a large syncline in the Allegheny Front and is the main geological feature of the watershed. The syncline is canoe-shaped, with a length of 70 miles (110 km) and a width of 5 miles (8.0 km). The crests of the anticlines on both sides have been eroded away. An escarpment known as Campbells Ledge is located near the river's mouth, where the Susquehanna Valley enters the 55-mile-long Lackawanna/Wyoming Valley.

A short distance downstream of the Stillwater Dam, the Lackawanna River flows through the Lackawanna River Gap and passes by the Stillwater Cliffs. Numerous other gaps, such as the Leggetts Creek Gap, Cobbs Gap, the Rushbrook Gap, and the Fall Brook Gap, occur on tributaries of the river. Downstream of Scranton, the river's channel becomes broader and the river becomes shallower. Assorted waste and debris is piled in many places in the Lackawanna River watershed. The waste can sometimes block waterways, causing localized flooding. During storms, minor tributaries also wash large quantities of urban debris and coal waste into the river, degrading it further.

In its upper reaches, the Lackawanna River is highly rocky and flows over cobbles. It has virtually continuous whitewater. There are also a few strainers within this reach of the river, due to its small size. Ledges become more common downstream of Forest City and there is one "distinctly high and nasty" ledge near Simpson. Downstream of Carbondale, the river becomes quieter, though there are still some ledges. A few riffles disrupt the otherwise smooth reach between Interstate 81 and Moosic, though there are many ledges at the latter location. In Scranton, the river flows between stone and concrete retaining walls, as well as high banks of slag. In general, riffles and pools on the river form a "watery stairway". The pools can be as short as a few hundred feet or as long as several thousand feet, with larger ones mainly correlating to broad floodplains. Rapids mainly occur in reaches such as Panther Bluff (in Fell Township), the Winson area (in Archbald and Jessup), near Cliff Street (in Scranton), and at the Moosic anticline (in Old Forge).

The channel of the Lackawanna River is sinuous and flows through narrow, alluvial floodplains at the base of steep hills.

There is a dam on the Lackawanna River at Forest City, and another one at Mayfield. A broken dam is located on the river below Jermyn.

The average annual rate of precipitation in the watershed of the Lackawanna River ranges from 35 to 45 inches (89 to 114 cm).

=== Geology ===
Deposits of glacial till containing boulders, cobbles, sand, and gravel occur in the Lackawanna River watershed. Some of the river's flow comes from recharge from this till, via ponds and wetlands. Some flow also comes from cracks in sandstone and shale strata. Groundwater flow along the river has been impacted by manmade events in some reaches.

In the Lackawanna River watershed, the boundary between the Llewellyn Formation and the Pocono and Pottsville Formations occurs at around 1,500 feet (460 m) above sea level on both sides of the valley. Numerous waterfalls occur on tributaries at this boundary; well-known once include the Nay Aug Falls, the Fall Brook Falls, Blakely Falls, and Panthers Bluff.

The main rock formations in the Lackawanna River watershed contain sandstone and shale, with rich coal deposits. For instance, the Llewellyn Formation contains anthracite in the watershed, along with sandstone and shale. Under this rock formation lie the Pottsville Formation, the Pocono Formation, the Mauch Chunk Formation, and the Catskill Formation. The first of these is made of coal, shale, sandstone, and conglomerate, while the second contains red sandstones and shales. The Pocono Formation contains dense sandstones and conglomerates and occurs in outcrops on the Moosic and West Mountains. The Catskill Formation mainly occurs on the fringes of the watershed. A total of 67 percent of the rock in the watershed is interbedded sedimentary rock, while the remaining 33 percent is sandstone.

The uplands of the Lackawanna River watershed contain poorly drained, rocky soils. The rocky floor contains mostly developed, impervious surfaces, but some abandoned mine lands have rapid permeability.

== Watershed ==
The watershed of the Lackawanna River has an area of 348 square miles (900 km^{2}). The mouth of the river is in the United States Geological Survey quadrangle of Pittston and the source is in the quadrangle of Forest City. It also passes through the quadrangles of Avoca, Scranton, Olyphant, Carbondale, and Waymart. The watershed occupies parts of Lackawanna County, Susquehanna County, Wayne County, and Luzerne County.

Large parts of the Lackawanna River watershed, including its upper reaches in the Moosic Mountains, West Mountain, and the North Pocono Plateau, are largely forested. However, large areas of urban and suburban development occur in the river's valley from Pittston to Carbondale, with some urban sprawl reaching as far as halfway from the river to the ridge tops. Abandoned mining land lies between many of the developed areas in this part of the watershed. Such land contains at least 25,000 to 30,000 acres (10,000 to 12,000 ha) of culm banks, overburden piles, silt basins, non-vegetated soil, and degraded waterways. One of the main owners of forested land in the watershed is the Pennsylvania Bureau of Forestry, which owns the Lackawanna State Forest that straddles the border between the Lackawanna River and Lehigh River watersheds. The Pennsylvania Game Commission also owns more than several thousand acres of Pennsylvania State Game Lands in the watershed. Additionally, there are more than 20,000 acres (8,100 ha) of wetlands in the watershed and another 10,000 to 15,000 acres (4,000 to 6,100 ha) historically existed. All of the minor tributaries of the river begin in wetlands in the West Mountains or the Moosic Mountains. Riparian wetlands occur along the lower reaches of the river and a feature known as the Duryea Swamp is located in former mining pits at the river's mouth.

Forested land is the most common land use in the Lackawanna River watershed, making up 58 percent of its land area. Agricultural land occupies 20 percent of the watershed and developed land occupies 16 percent of it.

As of the early 2000s, approximately 240,000 people inhabit the Lackawanna River watershed. The population peaked in the 1920s. The early settlers were of English, Irish, Welsh, and German descent, but in the 1880s and 1920s, immigrants from southern and eastern Europe arrived. The population has been in decline since at least World War II. The river passes through approximately 20 municipalities.

From Gilmartin Street to Depot Street, a distance of 3.1 miles (5.0 km), the Lackawanna River is entirely on private property, but is open to access. From the Mellow Park Footbridge downstream to Pennsylvania Route 347, a distance of 1.1 miles (1.8 km), 13 percent of the river is on public property and the remaining 87 percent is on private property, but is open to access. From Route 347 downstream to Green Ridge Street, only 1 percent of the river is on public property, but the remaining 99 percent is on private property that is open to the public. Water supply in the urban part of the Lackawanna Valley mainly comes from numerous reservoirs constructed between the 1870s and the 1930s. These reservoirs are mainly owned by the Pennsylvania American Water Company, but smaller companies own reservoirs and wells in the watershed as well. One example is a small reservoir in Covington Township, Lackawanna County, which is operated by the Moscow Water Company. The rural parts of the watershed are mainly supplied by private wells.

== History and etymology ==
The Lackawanna River was entered into the Geographic Names Information System on August 2, 1979. Its identifier in the Geographic Names Information System is 1199891. The river's name comes from a Delaware word meaning "stream that forks". It has also been known as Gachanai, Hazirok, L'chau-hanne, Lackawannok, Lechau-hanne, Lechau-hannek, and Lechauwah-hannek.

=== Early history ===
Native Americans have inhabited the area in the vicinity of the Lackawanna River since at least 9000 BCE. An archaeological site at the mouth of the river contains artifacts from 9000 BCE (the Archaic period) to as late as 1400 (the Woodland period). Various rock shelters have been discovered on the ridgelines of the Lackawanna River valley; they were used by migrating hunter-gatherers in prehistory. A number of Lenape gravesites historically existed on the river near present-day Scranton, but were eventually destroyed. According to Horace Hollister's History of the Lackawanna Valley, one of the destroyed graves may have belonged to Capoose, a Lenape chieftain who was visited by Count Zinzendorf, a Moravian missionary, near the river in 1742.

A number of Native American trails historically existed in the vicinity of the Lackawanna River. One of these was the Minisink Trail, which went from the upper Delaware River to the Lackawanna Valley and the Wyoming Valley via Wallenpaupack Creek and the Moosic Mountains. This trail was later used by settlers from Connecticut, who turned it into a wagon trail the Connecticut Road. Parts of the trail still exist in the form of jeep trails.

The first European settlers arrived in the vicinity of the Lackawanna River between the 1760s and the 1780s from Connecticut and Philadelphia. Land claim disputes led to several skirmishes between the settlers and Pennsylvania settlers; these disputes were known as the Yankee-Pennamite Wars.

=== 1800s and 1900s ===
For a time after the American Revolutionary War, the main industry in the Lackawanna River watershed was agriculture, though economic development was difficult to the mountainous terrain between the river and the coast. After the War of 1812, entrepreneurs began to take an interest in the coal reserves in the watershed. Coal was being mined near the tributary Racket Brook as early as 1820. By the 1820s, the Wurts Brothers had formed the Delaware and Hudson Coal Company to mine coal in the upper Lackawanna Valley and ship it to ports in New York. Due to the difficulties associated with building a canal over the Moosic Mountains, the company instead constructed a gravity railroad to transport the coal to the D&H Canal and on to the Hudson River. In the 1840s the D&H Company expanded their mining work further down the Lackawanna Valley, causing many towns in the area to enlarge. Coal mining was eventually done along the center of the Lackawanna Valley all the way from Pittston to Forest City.

In 1838, the Scranton and Platt iron workers build an iron works near the confluence of Roaring Brook with the Lackawanna River. The iron works eventually grew and became the city of Scranton. The iron and steel industry in Scranton ended in 1902. Additionally, virtually all of the old-growth forest in the watershed was cut down in the 1800s.

In 1852, the Scranton Brothers and other people developed the Delaware, Lackawanna and Western Railroad, providing another route to the Lackawanna River watershed and contributing to the valley's development. The Lehigh and Susquehanna Railroad also went into the watershed, and the Erie Railroad had a number of routes into it. These included the Erie and Wyoming Valley Railroad, which followed Roaring Brook, and the Jefferson Branch, which entered the river's watershed at Ararat Summit. The New York, Ontario and Western Railway, which was developed in 1890, was the last railroad to enter the watershed. It followed the river from Scranton to Union Dale before leaving the river's drainage basin via the East Branch Lackawanna River watershed.

In the 20th century, the anthracite industry remained the largest industry in the Lackawanna River region, though there was also a silk and textile industry. Additionally, agriculture remained a significant industry in the watershed into the early 20th century. However, the Great Depression of the 1930s caused a decline in mining activity. Mine pumping in the watershed ceased by 1961 and underground mining in the watershed ended on November 1, 1966, with the closing of the Continental Mine. Nevertheless, a small amount of strip mining and re-mining of previously mined sites has been done since the 1960s. By this point, the valley's railroad system was shrinking due to decreased coal shipments.

A gauging station was established on the Lackawanna River at Scranton in July 1908, but was discontinued in July 1913. Another gauging station was set up at Moosic in August 1913.

=== Modern history ===
Flooding events occurred on the Lackawanna River in 1902, 1922, 1936, 1942, 1954, 1955, 1972, 1985, and 1996, causing millions of dollars in property damage. Flood control dams such as the Stillwater Dam and the Aylesworth Dam were built in the watershed in 1960 and 1970, respectively. A number of levees and floodwalls were also erected in response to the floods.

A number of investor-owned water companies were developed in the Lackawanna River watershed in the 1880s. These merged into the Spring Brook Water Company at Scranton in 1928. The Spring Brook Water Company became the Pennsylvania Gas and Water Company in 1960 and remained under this name until 1996. Eventually the Pennsylvania Gas and Water Company lands were sold to the Pennsylvania American Water Company.

The effect of coal mining on water quality in the Lackawanna River watershed was known as early as 1904. One early plan for recovering from the effects of coal mining in the watershed was the Scranton Plan of 1942. A large number of studies of the Lackawanna River's water quality and habitat quality have been carried out. The Lackawanna River Corridor Association was founded in 1987 for the restoration and stewardship of the river. They created the Lackawanna River Citizens Master Plan between 1988 and 1990 and have also carried out stream walks and stream surveys on the river and its tributaries. In 1992 and 1993, the United States Army Corps of Engineers funded a study of the river's greenway. The study was carried out by the Corps of Engineers, as well as the National Park Service, the Heritage Authority, and the Lackawanna River Corridor Association. The Lackawanna River Watershed 2000 program was funded by the United States Environmental Protection Agency with the aim of alleviating problems from combined sewer overflows, acid mine drainage, and abandoned mine land.

As of the early 2000s, there are still 12 active mining operations in the Lackawanna River watershed. Only one has an NPDES permit.

== Biology ==
The upper reaches of the Lackawanna River watershed are a habitat of national significance. Several important natural areas occur in the watershed's upper reaches.

=== Animals ===
The main stem of the Lackawanna River is designated as a High-Quality Coldwater Fishery and a Migratory Fishery from the confluence of the East Branch Lackawanna River and the West Branch Lackawanna River to the Pennsylvania Route 347 bridge at Dickson City. From this point downriver to its mouth, the river is designated as a Coldwater Fishery and a Migratory Fishery. Wild trout naturally reproduce in the river from its headwaters downstream to the Lackawanna County/Luzerne County line, a distance of 35.60 miles (57.29 km). Five sections of the river are designated by the Pennsylvania Fish and Boat Commission as Class A Wild Trout Waters for brown trout. The sections are adjacent to each other and run from the upper Carbondale city line downstream to Green Ridge Street, a distance of 17.4 miles (28.0 km). Both brook trout and brown trout inhabit the river, but only the former are native. In addition to trout, smallmouth bass, sunfish, carp, suckers, crappies, darters, and dace have been observed in the river. The fishery was nearly destroyed by 150 years of anthracite mining, but has recovered since the 1970s.

The Lackawanna River was historically a "vibrant" brook trout fishery. Shad may have also occurred in the river until the 1820s, when dam construction on the Susquehanna River closed off access by anadromous fish. There is anecdotal evidence that the river was able to function as a trout fishery in the early 1900s, though the habitat had experienced significant degradation by then. Recovery began in the once the coal mining industry had ended in the 1960s and 1970s, and continued into the 1980s and 1990s due to the efforts of local groups and fishing clubs.

A number of waterfowl species are common in the watershed of the Lackawanna River. The most common duck species are black ducks, mallard ducks, and wood ducks. Other birds in the watershed include belted kingfishers, great blue herons, and green backed herons. Birds of prey that have been observed in the area include ospreys, barred owls, coopers hawk, red tailed hawk, and sharp skinned hawk. Amphibians such as spotted salamanders and green frogs inhabit the watershed, as do reptiles such as rattlesnakes and snapping turtles.

Various other fauna, including a number of game animals, inhabit the Lackawanna River watershed. Common mammals include beavers, black bears, foxes, minks, muskrats, raccoons, and white-tailed deer. A few river otters are occasionally observed in the river.

Substantial reaches of the Lackawanna River have a healthy and diverse macroinvertebrate population.

=== Plants ===
Successional forest cover and forested wetlands occur in the upper reaches of the Lackawanna River watershed. Even in more urban parts, the river and many of its major tributaries have substantial riparian buffers. However, the riparian buffer is less substantial below Scranton. The watershed contains a temperate mixed forest with a high level of biodiversity. In the south, there are oak and chestnut trees, while in the north, the forests contain maple, ash, and hickory. However, the elevations and soils in the watershed also allow several arctic and boreal species to grow in the watershed. Appalachian heath barrens occur on the Moosic Mountains and West Mountains, with communities of scrub oak and pitch pine give way to sedges and lichens. Boreal plants such as tamarack, black spruce, and paper birch inhabit wetlands in the watershed's upper reaches, as well as wetlands in the watersheds of Roaring Brook and Spring Brook. Pitcher plants, lady's slipper, rhododendron, huckleberry, mountain laurel, and leatherleaf also occur in these wetlands.

Virtually all of the forests in the Lackawanna River watershed are second-growth forests or third-growth forests. As of the early 2000s, 88 percent of the river's riparian buffer is intact or recovering. The stretches that lack any riparian buffering are most commonly on flood control levees in Dickson City, Duryea, Mayfield, and north Scranton. Property encroachments, coal dumps, and historic buildings in Archbald, Carbondale, Olyphant, and Scranton also detract from the river's riparian buffer.

== Recreation ==
There are numerous recreational facilities in the Lackawanna River watershed. These include state parks, state game lands, county and municipal parks, golf courses, Montage Mountain, and others.

Since the 1980s, the Lackawanna River has developed into a well-known "outstanding Class-A coldwater fishery". The river is also a fly fishing destination. It has Trophy Trout regulations from Blakely Corners to White Oak Run, forbidding live bait except in limited circumstances.

About 38.4 miles (61.8 km) of the Lackawanna River are navigable by canoe during snowmelt and within three to seven days of hard rain. It is typically navigable when the United States Geological Survey gauge at Archbald reads over 2.5 feet (0.76 m), though navigation becomes difficult when the gauge height is over 4 feet (1.2 m). However, even in the summer, when the gauge height is often 1.8 to 2.2 feet (0.55 to 0.67 m), a few pool reaches in Dickson City and Scranton are still navigable. The difficulty rating of the river from Stillwater Lake to Carbondale ranges from 1 to 3. From Carbondale to the river's mouth, the difficulty rating is mostly 1, but there is one class-4 rapid formed by a complex ledge system at Moosic. The scenery above Carbondale is described as "good to poor" in Edward Gertler's book Keystone Canoeing. The scenery below Carbondale is "fair to poor". However, Gertler also described the area as "a place that most of us associate with ugliness, with a capital U". A few of the larger tributaries are also seasonally navigable by canoe or kayak.

The Lackawanna River Canoe-a-thon has been conducted on the Lackawanna River annually since 1973. It was originally hosted by the Luzerne–Lackawanna Environmental Council and the Jaycees, but the Lackawanna River Corridor Association took over the role in 1988. The race was postponed once due to flooding and cancelled once due to drought.

A land sale of land in the Lackawanna River watershed to the private Theta Corporation generated some controversy. The sale caused many previously-use hunting lands to become restricted. However, the Theta Corporation and the Pennsylvania Fish and Boat Commission announced a cooperation to permit hunting on the lands was announced in 2001. At that point, the Theta Corporation owned 30,000 acres (12,000 ha) of land in the watershed, including large tracts in the Spring Brook and Roaring Brook sub-watersheds.

== See also ==
- Abrahams Creek, next tributary of the Susquehanna River going downriver
- Hicks Creek (Susquehanna River), next tributary of the Susquehanna River going upriver
- List of rivers of Pennsylvania
- List of tributaries of the Lackawanna River
