= Carbondale Township, Pennsylvania =

Township in Pennsylvania, US

- Township
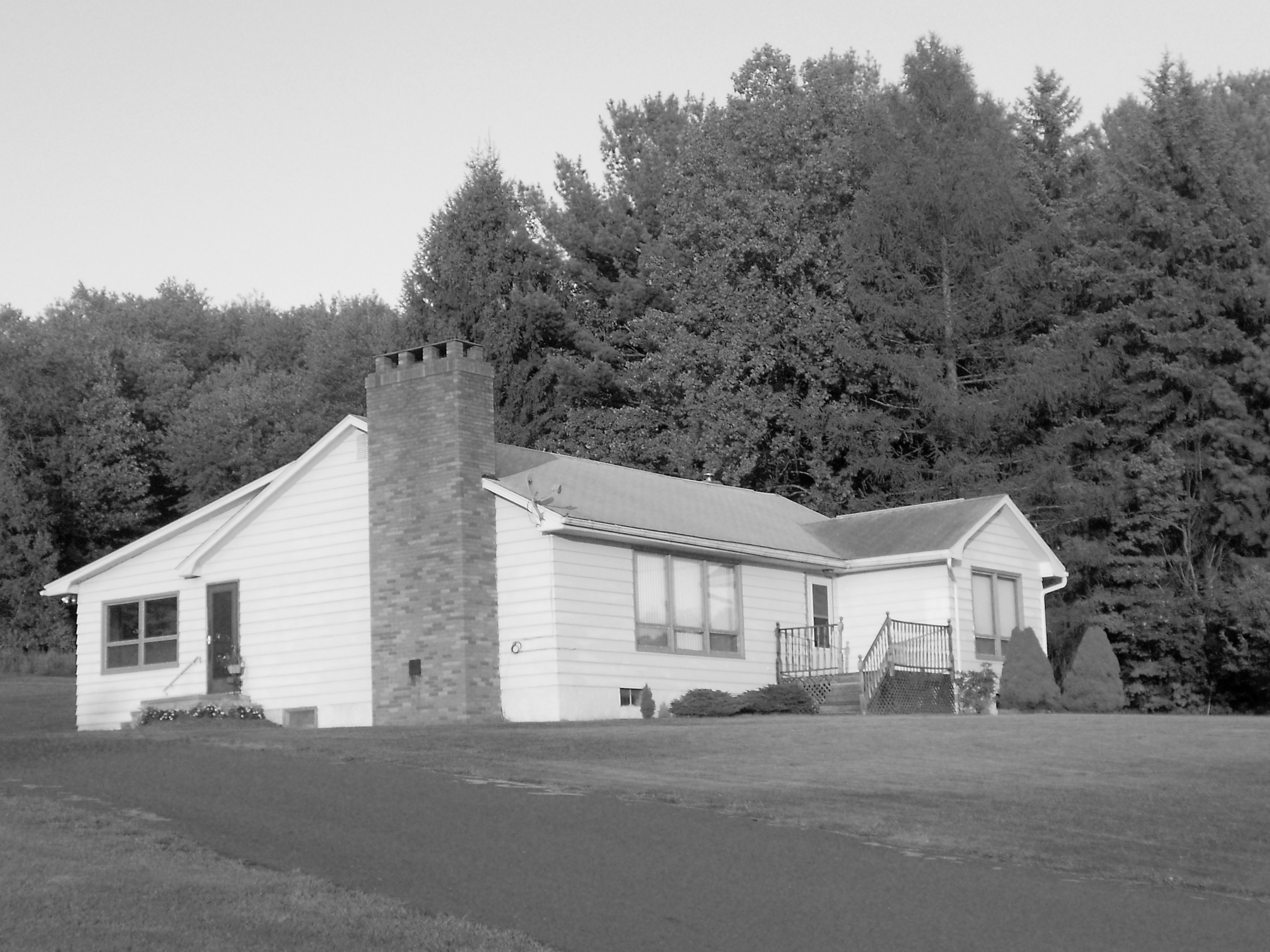
- House of Business Route US 6

- Logo

- Location of Pennsylvania in the United States
- Coordinates: 41°34′N 75°29′W
- Country: United States
- State: Pennsylvania
- County: Lackawanna

Area
  - Total: 14.01 sq mi (36.29 km^{2})
  - Land: 13.79 sq mi (35.71 km^{2})
  - Water: 0.22 sq mi (0.57 km^{2})
- Elevation: 1,614 ft (492 m)

Population (2020)
  - Total: 1,126 ▲
  - Estimate (2021): 1,125
  - Density: 80.6/sq mi (31.11/km^{2})
- Time zone: UTC-5 (EST)
  - Summer (DST): UTC-4 (EDT)
- Postal code: 18407
- Area code: 570
- FIPS code: 42-069-11240
- Website: carbondaletwp.com

Carbondale Township is a township in Lackawanna County, Pennsylvania and is respectively named for the adjoining city of Carbondale. The township is located near Scranton. The population was 1,126 at the 2020 census. The village of Childs is located in Carbondale township.

== Geography ==
According to the United States Census Bureau, the township has a total area of 14.0 square miles (36 km^{2}), of which 13.8 square miles (36 km^{2}) is land and 0.2 square miles (0.52 km^{2}) (1.65%) is water.

== Demographics ==
Historical population
Census	Pop.	Note	%±
2010	1,115		—
2020	1,126		1.0%
2021 (est.)	1,125		−0.1%
U.S. Decennial Census

As of the census of 2010, there were 1,115 people, 461 households, and 321 families residing in the township. The population density was 80.8 inhabitants per square mile (31.2/km^{2}). There were 495 housing units at an average density of 35.9 units per square mile (13.9 units/km^{2}). The racial makeup of the township was 97.6% White, 1.2% Black, 0.1% American Indian, 0.3% from other races and 0.9% from two or more races. Hispanic or Latino of any race were 0.69% of the population.

There were 461 households, out of which 25.2% had children under the age of 18 living with them, 53.8% were married couples living together, 11.9% had a female householder with no husband present, and 30.4% were non-families. 25.4% of all households were made up of individuals, and 13.9% had someone living alone who was 65 years of age or older. The average household size was 2.42 and the average family size was 2.89.

In the township the population was spread out, with 18.7% under the age of 18, 63.9% from 18 to 64, and 17.4% who were 65 years of age or older. The median age was 44.5 years.

The median income for a household in the township was $50,909, and the median income for a family was $63,125. Males had a median income of $44,338 versus $32,019 for females. The per capita income for the township was $25,322. About 3.5% of families and 3.1% of the population were below the poverty line, including 2.7% of those under age 18 and 1.7% of those age 65 or over.
