= East Branch Lackawanna River =

Physical characteristics
- Source
  - location: small lake in Preston Township, Pennsylvania
  - elevation: between 2,040 and 2,060 feet (620 and 630 m)
- Mouth
  - location: Lackawanna River at Stillwater Lake in Clifford Township, Susquehanna County, Pennsylvania
  - coordinates: 41°42′09″N 75°29′06″W
  - elevation: 1,572 ft (479 m)
- Length: 12.7 mi (20.4 km)
- Basin size: 19.0 mi^{2} (49 km^{2})
- Discharge
  - average: 15.47 cu ft/s (0.438 m^{3}/s) at Union Dale

Basin features
- Progression: Lackawanna River → Susquehanna River → Chesapeake Bay

The East Branch Lackawanna River is a tributary of the Lackawanna River in Wayne County and Susquehanna County, in Pennsylvania, in the United States. It is approximately 12.7 miles (20.4 km) long and flows through Preston Township in Wayne County and Ararat Township, Herrick Township, Union Dale, and Clifford Township. The watershed of the river has an area of 19.0 square miles (49 km^{2}). The river is not designated as impaired and has a relatively high level of water quality. A portion of the Moosic Mountains (specifically Ararat Mountain and Sugar Loaf Mountain) are in its vicinity. Source ponds in the river's watershed include Bone Pond, Dunns Pond, Independent Lake, Lake Lorain, Mud Pond, and Orson Pond. There are a number of wetlands and swamps in the watershed, but agricultural and forested land is present as well.

The New York, Ontario and Western Railway historically passed through the watershed of the East Branch Lackawanna River. Additionally, a number of bridges have been constructed across the river and there are three major road crossings. The river is designated as a High Quality Coldwater Fishery (a designation which it received in 1991) and a Migratory Fishery. Both brook trout and brown trout are present within it. However, the river has a slightly impaired macroinvertebrate population. It has been described as an "excellent wild trout fishery".

== Course ==
The East Branch Lackawanna River begins in a small lake in Preston Township, Wayne County. It flows southwest through a valley for a few miles, receiving two unnamed tributaries from the left. Its valley broadens and it briefly turns west before turning south-southwest and receiving two unnamed tributaries from the right. After meandering south-southwest for several tenths of a mile, the river exits Preston Township and Wayne County. It then enters Ararat Township, Susquehanna County and flows south alongside the county line for a few tenths of a mile. The river then passes through Mud Pond and turns west for a short distance before turning south-southeast. After several tenths of a mile, it reenters Preston Township, Wayne County, crosses Pennsylvania Route 370, and receives two more unnamed tributaries from the left before turning west-southwest and reentering Ararat Township, Susquehanna County. The river then turns south and slightly west for several miles, entering Herrick Township and receiving several more unnamed tributaries from both sides. It eventually crosses Pennsylvania Route 371 and enters Union Dale, where it turns south-southeast for a few tenths of a mile and then begins flowing south again. After more than a mile, the river enters Clifford Township and turns west, almost immediately entering Stillwater Lake and reaching its confluence with the Lackawanna River.

The East Branch Lackawanna River joins the Lackawanna River 40.32 miles (64.89 km) upriver of its mouth.

=== Tributaries ===
The East Branch Lackawanna River has no named tributaries. However, it does have a number of unnamed tributaries. These include "Orson/Lorain Tributary", "Dunns Tributary", "Bone Tributary", "Independent Tributary", and "Unnamed trib 1". Their lengths are 2.8 miles (4.5 km), 0.8 miles (1.3 km), 2.3 miles (3.7 km), 1.1 miles (1.8 km), and 1.3 miles (2.1 km).

== Hydrology and climate ==
The East Branch Lackawanna River is not designated as an impaired stream. The water quality of the river ranges from good to excellent. The waters throughout most of the river's length were described as "clear and inviting" in a 2002 report. However, two stream segments were found to be impacted. The Preserve at Dunn Lake has received a permit from the Pennsylvania Department of Environmental Protection to discharge 19,000 gallons of treated sewage per day into the river.

The discharge of the East Branch Lackawanna River was measured in 1970. On May 13, it was 26 cubic feet per second and on September 17, it was 4.5 cubic feet per second. Between 1950 and 1991, 24 measurements of the stream's discharge at Union Dale ranged from 0.83 cubic feet per second to 78.3 cubic feet per second, with an average of approximately 15.47 cubic feet per second. The gauge height ranged from 9.04 to 9.60 feet (2.76 to 2.93 m). In the 1970s, the water temperature of the river at Uniondale was found to range from 11.0 to 18.5 °C (51.8 to 65.3 °F) during several measurements. The specific conductance ranged from 50 to 97 micro-siemens per centimeter at 25 °C (77 °F). The turbidity was measured to be less than 5 Jackson Turbidity Units on November 4, 1975. The concentration of dissolved solids was 56 milligrams per liter. The level of water hardness ranged from 21 to 34 milligrams per liter.

The concentration of dissolved oxygen in the East Branch Lackawanna River at Uniondale was measured to be 11.0 milligrams per liter on November 4, 1975. In the 1970s, the concentration of hydrogen ions ranged from 0.00004 to 0.00101 milligrams per liter. The pH ranged from 6.0 to 7.4, with an average of 6.83. The concentration of carbon dioxide ranged from 1.2 to 18 milligrams per liter and the bicarbonate concentration ranged from 11 to 29 milligrams per liter. The concentration of organic nitrogen was once measured to be 0.13 milligrams per liter, while the concentration of nitrogen in the form of ammonia was 0.040 milligrams per liter and the concentration of nitrogen in the form of nitrate was 0.53. The concentration of nitrogen in the form of nitrite was 0.030 milligrams per liter.

The concentration of magnesium in the filtered waters of the East Branch Lackawanna River at Uniondale ranged from 0.90 to 1.50 milligrams per liter. The calcium concentration ranged from 7.00 to 11.0 milligrams per liter, also in filtered water. The concentration of recoverable iron in unfiltered water was 30 micrograms per liter. The sulfate concentration in filtered water ranged from 10.0 to 12.0 milligrams per liter and the chloride concentration in filtered water ranged from 3.2 to 5.1 milligrams per liter.

In the early 1900s, the average annual rate of precipitation in the watershed of the East Branch Lackawanna River was 35 to 40 inches (89 to 102 cm).

== Geography and geology ==
The elevation near the mouth of the East Branch Lackawanna River is 1,572 feet (479 m) above sea level. The elevation of the river's source is between 2,040 and 2,060 feet (620 and 630 m) above sea level.

The headwaters of the East Branch Lackawanna River are in a number of glacial bogs and lakes. Ararat Mountain and Sugar Loaf Mountain, the northernmost parts of the Moosic Mountains, are in the river's watershed. They have an elevation of approximately 2,400 feet (730 m) above sea level.

Gravel-bottomed riffles in the East Branch Lackawanna River serve to aerate the water, while deep pools serve as resting areas for fish. A rubble dam upstream of a livestock crossing forms a swimming hole in the river. The river has stable streambanks in most reaches. However, there are areas of slight erosion at two bridge crossings and one additional area of heavy erosion near a patch of agricultural land.

A 1921 book described the topography in the watershed of the East Branch Lackawanna River as "rough and mountainous". The watershed contains a narrow valley bordered by steep hills. Ponds, lakes, and swamps occur throughout the watershed, which has been affected by glaciation.

The channel of the West Branch Lackawanna River is sinuous and flows through rock formations consisting of sandstone and shale.

== Watershed ==
The watershed of the East Branch Lackawanna River has an area of 19.0 square miles (49 km^{2}). It is located in southeastern Susquehanna County and northwestern Wayne County. The mouth of the river is in the United States Geological Survey quadrangle of Forest City. However, its source is in the quadrangle of Orson.

The watershed of the East Branch Lackawanna River is largely undeveloped, with farms, small communities, and residential areas. The land use in the watershed of the East Branch Lackawanna River includes agricultural land, such as dairy farms. There are also successional abandoned farms and forested land. Additionally, patches of wetlands and swamps occur in the watershed. The watershed has less than 10 percent impervious coverage. There are three major road crossings along the river. Additionally, a closed landfill is located in the upper reaches of the watershed, near Dunn Pond.

The East Branch Lackawanna River is a second-order stream. Lake Poyntelle, which drains into the Delaware River, is only 0.5 miles (0.80 km) from Lake Lorain, which drains into the East Branch Lackawanna River.

There are numerous source ponds in the watershed of the East Branch Lackawanna River. Named ones include Bone Pond, Dunns Pond, Independent Lake, Lake Lorain, Mud Pond, and Orson Pond. The mouth of the river is at Stillwater Dam, which was built by the United States Army Corps of Engineers in 1960.

== History ==
The East Branch Lackawanna River was entered into the Geographic Names Information System on August 2, 1979. Its identifier in the Geographic Names Information System is 1173749.

The New York, Ontario and Western Railway historically passed through the watershed of the East Branch Lackawanna River, entering it at Lake Lorain. In the early 1900s, the main industry in the river's watershed was agriculture. Around this time, communities in the watershed included Orson and Poyntelle. Their populations were 220 and 53, respectively.

A concrete slab bridge carrying Pennsylvania Route 370 over the East Branch Lackawanna River was built in 1948. It is 22.0 feet (6.7 m) long and is situated in Preston Township, Wayne County, 0.1 miles (0.16 km) east of the count line. A concrete tee beam bridge carrying State Route 4035/Oxbow Road over the river was constructed in Preston Township in 1960. This bridge is 37.1 feet (11.3 m) long. A steel stringer/multi-beam or girder bridge carrying T592/Suecz Road in Susquehanna County crosses the river 3 miles (4.8 km) north of Union Dale and was repaired in 1993. A bridge of the same type was constructed across the river in Union Dale in 1920 and was repaired in 1981. It is 29.9 feet (9.1 m) long and carries T609/East Mountain Road. A three-span prestressed box beam or girders bridge carrying Pennsylvania Route 171 was built over the East Branch Lackawanna River in 1958 and was repaired in 1996. This bridge is 246.1 feet (75.0 m) long and is in Clifford Township, Susquehanna County. A bridge of a similar type was constructed over the river in 2008 in Herrick Township. It carries Pennsylvania Route 371 and is 44.0 feet (13.4 m) long.

The East Branch Lackawanna River was upgraded to High-Quality Coldwater Fishery status in 1991. Volunteers carried out a stream survey of the river on May 1, June 9, and July 14, 1999.

== Biology ==
The drainage basin of the East Branch Lackawanna River is designated as a High-Quality Coldwater Fishery and a Migratory Fishery. A reach of the river is designated by the Pennsylvania Fish and Boat Commission as Class B wild trout waters. Wild trout naturally reproduce in the river from Mud Pond downstream to its mouth, a distance of 8.30 miles (13.36 km). The East Branch Lackawanna River has high populations of brook trout and brown trout. For this reason, it is not stocked.

The East Branch Lackawanna River has a slightly impaired macroinvertebrate population.

Along the East Branch Lackawanna River, there are "important natural areas" at Dunns Pond and Mud Pond. Several rare or endangered plant species have been observed at these ponds. Dunns Pond, Orson Glade, and Mud Pond form a wetland complex of regional importance. A wetland along the river has been recognized as an Important Bird Area by the Audubon Society, as has the Mud Pond area. Hemlock trees occur along the river's banks in some reaches.

The habitat conditions along the East Branch Lackawanna River have been described as "excellent".

== Recreation ==
The East Branch Lackawanna River has been described as an "excellent wild trout fishery" and a "pristine cold-water fisher[y]". The O&W Trail now roughly follows the river for some distance. The construction of a public parking area for fly-fishing on the river has been proposed. Additionally, the Union Dale Park is capable of serving as a public access point to the river. A stream walk once discovered at least four access points along the East Branch Lackawanna River.

In his book Paddling Pennsylvania: Canoeing and Kayaking the Keystone State's Rivers and Lakes, Jeff Mitchell wrote that the inlet of the East Branch Lackawanna River at Stillwater Lake "invites some exploring".

A 1970 report proposed a reservoir for the dual purposes of recreation and fishing on the East Branch Lackawanna River. It was to be located 9 miles (14 km) north of Forest City and to have an area of 45 acres (18 ha) and a volume of 416 acre-feet, with an earth-fill dam with a height of 60 feet (18 m). The annual recreation visitation was estimated to eventually reach 44,000 recreation-days, while the annual fishing visitation was estimated to be 1800 fisherman-days.

== See also ==
- Brace Brook, next tributary of the Lackawanna River going downriver
- West Branch Lackawanna River
- List of rivers of Pennsylvania
- List of tributaries of the Lackawanna River
