= West Branch Lackawanna River =

West Branch Lackawanna River Ball Creek

Physical characteristics
- Source
  - location: wetland in Ararat Township, Susquehanna County, Pennsylvania
  - elevation: between 2,000 and 2,020 feet (610 and 620 m)
- Mouth
  - location: Lackawanna River at Stillwater Lake in Union Dale, Susquehanna County, Pennsylvania
  - coordinates: 41°42′41″N 75°29′16″W
  - elevation: 1,575 ft (480 m)
- Length: 9.5 mi (15.3 km)
- Basin size: 16.8 sq mi (44 km^{2})

Basin features
- Progression: Lackawanna River → Susquehanna River → Chesapeake Bay
- Tributaries
  - right: Fiddle Lake Creek

The West Branch Lackawanna River (also known as Ball Creek) is a tributary of the Lackawanna River in Susquehanna County, Pennsylvania, in the United States. It is approximately 9.5 miles (15.3 km) long and flows through Ararat Township, Herrick Township, and Union Dale. The watershed of the river has an area of 16.8 square miles (44 km^{2}). The river is not designated as an impaired stream and it has a high level of water quality. Lakes and wetlands in the river's watershed include Ball Lake, Fiddle Lake, Hathaway Lake, Lake Romobe, Lewis Lake, Lowe Lake, and Sink Hole Swamp. The river is also dammed by at least two dams: the Romobe Lake Dam and the Hathaway Pond Dam.

The West Branch Lackawanna River is a second-order stream. Its watershed is narrow and largely undeveloped. The Delaware and Hudson Railway historically followed the river for some distance and a number of bridges have also been constructed over it. The river is designated as a Coldwater Fishery and a Migratory Fishery. Both brook trout and brown trout inhabit it and the river was historically stocked with trout as well. Recreational opportunities in the watershed include the D&H Trail and Pennsylvania State Game Lands Number 236.

== Course ==
The West Branch Lackawanna River begins in a wetland in Ararat Township. It flows north for a few tenths of a mile before entering Sinkhole Swamp. From this point, it turns east and enters Fomobe Lake. From the southeastern part of this lake, the river flows south-southeast for a few tenths of a mile and enters Hathaway Lake. From the southern end of that lake, the river flows southeast for more than a mile before turning south-southeast. After several tenths of a mile, it turns south and then south-southwest. It then flows west-southwest for a short distance before turning south-southeast and entering Herrick Township. The river passes through a wetland and continues meandering south-southeast as its valley becomes narrower. It eventually turns in a roughly southerly direction for a few miles, crossing Pennsylvania Route 374 and entering Union Dale. In Union Dale, the river continues to flow south, receiving Fiddle Lake Creek, its only named tributary, from the right after several tenths of a mile. A few tenths of a mile further downstream, it enters Stillwater Lake and reaches its confluence with the Lackawanna River.

The West Branch Lackawanna River joins the Lackawanna River 40.32 miles (64.89 km) upriver of its mouth.

=== Tributaries ===
The West Branch Lackawanna River has one named tributary, which is known as Fiddle Lake Creek. Fiddle Lake Creek joins the West Branch Lackawanna River 1.20 miles (1.93 km) upriver of its mouth. Its watershed has an area of 6.47 square miles (16.8 km^{2}). Other unnamed tributaries include "Unnamed trib 1", "Unnamed trib 2", and "Ball Lake Creek". Their lengths are 1.6 miles (2.6 km), 1.3 miles (2.1 km), and 1.9 miles (3.1 km), respectively.

== Hydrology and climate ==
The West Branch Lackawanna River is not designated as an impaired stream. The water quality of the river was described as "good to excellent" in the Lackawanna River Watershed Conservation Plan. However, dairy farming in the watershed and fecal contaminants in some source ponds have caused some concern.

In most reaches, the West Branch Lackawanna River has relatively clear waters. However, approximately 7.25 miles (11.67 km) upriver of its mouth, there is a reach where it has cloudy waters due to siltation caused by cows in the river. Two small pipes made of PVC discharge clear water into the river at road crossings. However, the source of these pipes is unknown.

On November 10, 1950, the discharge of the West Branch Lackawanna River near Union Dale was measured to be 22.6 cubic feet per second.

In the early 1900s, the average annual rate of precipitation in the watershed of the West Branch Lackawanna River was 35 to 40 inches (89 to 102 cm).

== Geography and geology ==
The elevation near the mouth of the West Branch Lackawanna River is 1,575 feet (480 m) above sea level. The elevation of the river's source is between 2,000 and 2,020 feet (610 and 620 m) above sea level.

The mouth of the West Branch Lackawanna River is at Stillwater Dam, which was built by the United States Army Corps of Engineers in 1960. Source ponds in the river's watershed include Ball Lake, Fiddle Lake, Hathaway Lake, Lake Romobe, Lewis Lake, Lowe Lake, and Sink Hole Swamp. The headwaters of the river are in small lakes and swamps upstream of Hathaway Lake. A swamp known as Pine Swamp is in the watershed.

No debris was observed in the West Branch Lackawanna River during a 1999 stream survey. Additionally, there was no trash along its banks. The streambanks are stable in most reaches, but there is slight erosion in a few places. There is a concrete spillway at the outflow of Hathaway Lake. The Romobe Lake Dam is located on the river. As of 1980, it is in poor condition. Additionally, the Hathaway Pond Dam is located 3,000 feet (910 m) downriver of the Romobe Lake Dam and has been labelled a "significant" hazard.

A 1921 book described the topography in the watershed of the West Branch Lackawanna River as "rough and mountainous". The watershed contains a narrow valley bordered by steep hills. Ponds, lakes, and swamps occur throughout the watershed, which has been affected by glaciation.

The channel of the West Branch Lackawanna River is sinuous and flows through rock formations consisting of sandstone and shale.

== Watershed ==
The watershed of the West Branch Lackawanna River has an area of 16.8 square miles (44 km^{2}). The mouth of the river is in the United States Geological Survey quadrangle of Forest City. However, its source is in the quadrangle of Thompson. The river also passes through the quadrangle of Orson.

The West Branch Lackawanna River is a second-order stream. The river's watershed is relatively narrow in an east–west direction and relatively long in a north–south direction. It is in the extreme northeast of the Lackawanna River watershed and mainly occupies Herrick Township and Ararat Township. A smaller part of the watershed is in Union Dale and an even smaller part is in Clifford Township.

The watershed of the West Branch Lackawanna River is largely undeveloped, with farms, small communities, and residential areas. Dairy farms occur within the watershed and there is a large farm near the headwaters. The watershed is a "sensitive stream" and thus has less than 10 percent impervious cover.

A wetland complex of regional significance exists in the watershed of the West Branch Lackawanna River.

== History ==
The West Branch Lackawanna River was entered into the Geographic Names Information System on August 2, 1979. Its identifier in the Geographic Names Information System is 1190910. The river is also known as Ball Creek. This name appears on a United States Geological Survey map of Susquehanna County dating to 1944. However, in 1968, David G. Lappin of the United States Geological Survey was unable to verify the variant name. Several locals who were questioned had never heard the river being called "Ball Creek".

The Newburg Turnpike, one of the earliest roads in its vicinity, historically crossed the West Branch Lackawanna River at Herrick, near where Pennsylvania Route 374 is today. In the 1800s, timbering operations came to affect lakes in the river's watershed. The area also was a host to sawmills and wood acid factories. The Delaware and Hudson Railway historically followed the West Branch Lackawanna River as far as Ararat. It left the watershed at Ararat Summit. Once the railroad arrived, industries such as dairying and ice harvesting began to occur in the area.

In the early 1900s, the major industries in the watershed of the West Branch Lackawanna River were mainly agriculture and ice harvesting. The river was also used as water power for some small mills at Uniondale. Around this time period, major communities in the watershed included Union Dale, Herrick Center, and Burnwood. Their populations were 355, 327, and 104, respectively.

A prestressed box beam or girders bridge carrying Pennsylvania Route 374 over the West Branch Lackawanna River was built in 1958. It is 40.0 feet (12.2 m) long and is situated in Herrick Township. A three-span bridge of the same type was built over the river in 1961 in Union Dale and was repaired in 2010. This bridge is 202.1 feet (61.6 m) long and carries State Route 2040 / Skyline Drive.

Volunteers carried out a stream survey of the West Branch Lackawanna River on May 1, 1999. In 2001, the Theta Land Company opened a section of the river to fishing by leasing them to the Pennsylvania Fish and Boat Commission for $1 per year.

== Biology ==
The drainage basin of the West Branch Lackawanna River is designated as a Coldwater Fishery and a Migratory Fishery. Wild trout naturally reproduce in the river from 6.70 miles (10.78 km) upriver of its mouth all the way downstream to its confluence with the Lackawanna River.

The West Branch Lackawanna River has a small population of wild brook trout and brown trout. It has also been stocked, but this has ceased due to property conflicts.

The Herrick Township Swamp, which is in the watershed of the West Branch Lackawanna River, is designated as an Important Bird Area by the Audubon Society. The Lake Romobe area, which is also in the river's watershed, holds this designation.

There are some green algae growths on rocks in the West Branch Lackawanna River downstream of river mile 7.25. The algae possibly comes from agricultural runoff. The vegetation along the river was described in a 2002 report as "in good condition". It consisted of brush, forests, marshes/wetlands, natural fields, and pastures. An estimated 36 percent of the river had forests along its banks, 32 percent had brush, 13 percent had marshes, 10 percent had pastures, 6 percent had natural fields, and less than 2 percent had bare or compacted ground. A large hemlock forest surrounds the river for 1.5 miles (2.4 km).

== Recreation ==
The D&H Rail Trail passes through the watershed of the West Branch Lackawanna River. In the early 2000s, the Lackawanna River Watershed Conservation Plan recommended further improvement of this rail trail. However, it is mostly used by locals. The main stem of the river has been described as a "pristine cold-water fisher[y]".

There are some trails going to and alongside the West Branch Lackawanna River. These trails provide access for fishermen. However, much of the river's length is difficult to access due to dense vegetation and extensive posting.

Pennsylvania State Game Lands Number 236 are located to the west of the West Branch Lackawanna River. These state game lands have an area of 2,009 acres (813 ha).

== See also ==
- Brace Brook, next tributary of the Lackawanna River going downriver
- East Branch Lackawanna River
- List of rivers of Pennsylvania
- List of tributaries of the Lackawanna River
