= Fiddle Lake Creek =

Physical characteristics
- Source
  - location: Fiddle Lake in Ararat Township, Susquehanna County, Pennsylvania
  - elevation: between 2,000 and 2,020 feet (610 and 620 m)
- Mouth
  - location: West Branch Lackawanna River in Union Dale, Susquehanna County, Pennsylvania
  - coordinates: 41°42′59″N 75°29′19″W
  - elevation: 1,591 ft (485 m)
- Length: 6.0 mi (9.7 km)
- Basin size: 6.47 mi^{2} (16.8 km^{2})

Basin features
- Progression: West Branch Lackawanna River → Lackawanna River → Susquehanna River → Chesapeake Bay

Fiddle Lake Creek is a tributary of the West Branch Lackawanna River in Susquehanna County, Pennsylvania, in the United States. It is approximately 6.0 miles (9.7 km) long and flows through Ararat Township, Herrick Township, and Union Dale. The watershed of the creek has an area of 6.47 square miles (16.8 km^{2}). A reach of the creek is impaired by water temperatures and an unknown cause. The creek flows through the Union Dale Gorge, which is 50 to 60 feet (15 to 18 m) deep. At the Fiddle Lake outflow, the creek is 3 feet (0.91 m) wide, but at least one reach is 20 to 30 feet (6.1 to 9.1 m) wide. It is a first-order stream. A painting of the creek by Union Dale artist Robert Stark is on display at the William J. Nealon Federal Building and United States Courthouse, as of 2013.

== Course ==
Fiddle Lake Creek begins in Fiddle Lake, near the southern edge of Ararat Township. It flows southeast for several tenths of a mile, entering Herrick Township and passing through a wetland before reaching another lake. At this point, the creek turns south-southeast for a few miles, passing through two more wetlands. In the southern wetland, it turns south-southwest for several tenths of a mile and crosses Pennsylvania Route 374 before turning southeast for several tenths of a mile and passing through another wetland. At this point, the creek turns south-southwest for a few tenths of a mile before turning south-southeast and entering Lewis Lake, where it flows into Union Dale. From the southeastern end of the lake, the creek flows in an easterly direction for a short distance before reaching its confluence with the West Branch Lackawanna River.

Fiddle Lake Creek joins the West Branch Lackawanna River 1.20 miles (1.93 km) upriver of its mouth.

== Hydrology ==
A reach of Fiddle Lake Creek is designated as an impaired waterbody. The causes of impairment are water temperature and one unknown cause. The impairment comes from natural sources.

== Geography and geology ==
The elevation near the mouth of Fiddle Lake Creek is 1,591 feet (485 m) above sea level. The elevation of the creek's source is between 2,000 and 2,020 feet (610 and 620 m) above sea level.

At the outflow of Fiddle Lake, Fiddle Lake Creek is approximately 3 feet (0.91 m) wide and approximately 1 foot (0.30 m) deep. At the inflow to Lewis Lake, the creek is 20 to 30 feet (6.1 to 9.1 m) wide and 3 feet (0.91 m) deep. However, at the outflow of Lewis Lake, it is only 10 feet (3.0 m) wide and 6 inches (15 cm) deep.

In Union Dale, Fiddle Lake Creek flows through a deep, narrow gorge known as the Union Dale Gorge. In the gorge, the creek cuts through sandstone and shale of the Catskill Formation, forming vertical rock walls with a depth of 50 to 60 feet (15 to 18 m). The creek also drains a portion of the Ararat Plateau. A waterfall known as Lake Lewis Falls is in the watershed of Fiddle Lake Creek in Union Dale.

In the early 1900s, the channel of Fiddle Lake Creek at its outflow from Fiddle Lake was noted to be muddy, but lacking in debris. At the outlet of Lewis Lake, however, the creek had a rocky channel with some debris. At the inflow to that lake, the channel was free of debris and flowed through a swamp.

== Watershed ==
The watershed of Fiddle Lake Creek has an area of 6.47 square miles (16.8 km^{2}). The mouth of the creek is in the United States Geological Survey quadrangle of Forest City. However, its source is in the quadrangle of Thompson. The creek also passes through the quadrangle of Clifford.

Fiddle Lake Creek is a first-order stream, though it has unnamed tributaries. The creek's watershed contains less than 10 percent impervious surface and is a "sensitive stream".

Major lakes in the watershed of Fiddle Lake Creek include Lewis Lake, Lowe Lake, and Fiddle Lake. The first of these is in Union Dale and the third is in Herrick Township.

== History and recreation ==
Fiddle Lake Creek was entered into the Geographic Names Information System on August 2, 1979. Its identifier in the Geographic Names Information System is 1174731.

In the 1800s and possibly the early 1900s, a mill operated along Fiddle Lake Creek at the Union Dale Gorge, taking advantage of the water power provided by the creek's rapid descent in that reach. There is still an old millstone near the bottom of the gorge.

A concrete tee beam bridge carrying Pennsylvania Route 374 was constructed across Fiddle Lake Creek in 1959. The bridge is 32.2 feet (9.8 m) long and is situated in Herrick Township.

A diptych painting of Fiddle Lake Creek entitled "Headwaters Of The Susquehanna River 2007" was painted by Robert Stark. As of 2013, the painting is on long-term display at the William J. Nealon Federal Building and United States Courthouse in Scranton.

A reach of Fiddle Lake Creek flows through Pennsylvania State Game Lands Number 236.

== See also ==
- List of rivers of Pennsylvania
- List of tributaries of the Lackawanna River
