= White Oak Run (Lackawanna River tributary) =

White Oak Run White Oak Run No. 1

Physical characteristics
- Source
  - location: mountain in Jefferson Township, Lackawanna County, Pennsylvania
  - elevation: between 2,180 and 2,200 feet (660 and 670 m)
- Mouth
  - location: Lackawanna River in Archbald, Lackawanna County, Pennsylvania
  - coordinates: 41°29′49″N 75°32′25″W
  - elevation: 892 ft (272 m)
- Length: 3.4 mi (5.5 km)
- Basin size: 5.11 sq mi (13.2 km^{2})

Basin features
- Progression: Lackawanna River → Susquehanna River → Chesapeake Bay
- Tributaries
  - right: Indian Cave Creek

White Oak Run (also known as White Oak Run No. 1) is a tributary of the Lackawanna River in Lackawanna County, Pennsylvania, in the United States. It is approximately 3.4 miles (5.5 km) long and flows through Jefferson Township and Archbald. The watershed of the stream has an area of 5.11 square miles (13.2 km^{2}). The stream is impacted by various types of debris, localized iron hydroxide deposits, stormwater, and combined sewer overflows. However, its middle and upper reaches are largely undisturbed. The White Oak Ravines are in the stream's watershed.

A number of mine openings historically existed along White Oak Run. A bridge was also constructed across the stream in 1908. White Oak Run is designated as a Coldwater Fishery and a Migratory Fishery. It has a stable riparian buffer in many of its reaches. Plants in the buffer include hemlocks and rhododendrons.

== Course ==
White Oak Run begins on a mountain in Jefferson Township. It flows southwest for a few tenths of a mile before turning west-southwest for a few tenths of a mile. The stream then turns west-northwest for several tenths of a mile and enters Archbald. It then turns southwest and enters a narrow, shallow valley as it continues flowing down the mountain. After a short distance, the stream west-northwest for several tenths of a mile before receiving Indian Cave Creek, its only named tributary, from the right. The stream then flows west for several tenths of a mile, passing through the White Oak Reservoir and crossing US Route 6. Several tenths of a mile downstream of US Route 6, it arrives at the bottom of the mountain and reaches its confluence with the Lackawanna River.

White Oak Run joins the Lackawanna River 22.42 miles (36.08 km) upriver of its mouth.

=== Tributaries ===
White Oak Run has one officially named tributary, which is known as Indian Cave Creek. Indian Cave Creek joins White Oak Run 1.27 miles (2.04 km) upstream of its mouth. Its watershed has an area of 1.59 square miles (4.1 km^{2}). White Oak Run also has a number of unnamed tributaries.

== Hydrology ==
Some small mine seeps contribute iron hydroxide to White Oak Run. However, their effects are localized. Urban debris, construction debris, and other litter occur in the stream's channel in its lower reaches. Additionally, combined sewer overflows and stormwater discharge into the stream near its mouth.

In the early 1900s, White Oak Run was clear as far downstream as one of its tributaries. However, flow from a slush bank owned by the Archbald Coal Company turned the stream black below the confluence. The stream was black from that point downstream to its mouth and had culm deposits on its streambanks and in its streambed.

The peak annual discharge of White Oak Run upstream of its confluence with the Lackawanna River has a 10 percent chance of reaching 644 cubic feet (18.2 m^{3}) per second. It has a 2 percent chance of reaching 1,086 cubic feet (30.8 m^{3}) per second and a 1 percent chance of reaching 1,308 cubic feet (37.0 m^{3}) per second. The peak annual discharge has a 0.2 percent chance of reaching 1,917 cubic feet (54.3 m^{3}) per second.

== Geography and geology ==
The elevation near the mouth of White Oak Run is 892 feet (272 m) above sea level. The elevation of the stream's source is between 2,180 and 2,200 feet (660 and 670 m) above sea level.

A morphologic feature known as the White Oak Ravines is in the watershed of White Oak Run. The headwaters of the stream are in the Moosic Mountains.

The lower reaches of White Oak Run are impacted by urban development and historical mining. However, the middle and upper reaches of the stream are relatively undisturbed. The Lackawanna River Watershed Conservation Plan describes its upper reaches as "pristine" and the reach downstream of Indian Cave Creek as "very scenic".

White Oak Run begins to experience disturbances from past mining activity a short distance upstream of the Robert Casey Highway. Overburden piles have altered its course and small mine seeps discharge into it. In its last 0.8 miles (1.3 km), the stream flows through a steep ravine with rock ledges and some coal seams. The substrate in this reach consists of bedrock, large boulders, and rock ledges. There are outcroppings of conglomerate on the stream up to 2 miles (3.2 km) upstream of its mouth.

The final 600 feet (180 m) of White Oak Run is channelized with concrete and rock walls.

== Watershed ==
The watershed of White Oak Run has an area of 5.11 square miles (13.2 km^{2}). The mouth of the stream is in the United States Geological Survey quadrangle of Olyphant. However, its source is in the quadrangle of Lake Ariel.

White Oak Run is a second-order stream. It is one of the larger tributaries of the Lackawanna River. Pennsylvania State Game Lands are in the watershed's upper reaches. White Oak Run is impounded by a dam known as the White Oak Dam. The Archbald Borough Building is located at the mouth of the creek.

White Oak Run is a source of flooding in the borough of Archbald. Property owners along the stream have been known to experience basement flooding.

== History ==
White Oak Run was entered into the Geographic Names Information System on August 2, 1979. Its identifier in the Geographic Names Information System is 1199784.

The Archbald Coal Company Breaker was historically in the watershed of White Oak Run. Additionally, a number of mine openings were constructed along the stream by the Evans and Owens brothers. A concrete slab bridge carrying Goers Hill Road over White Oak Run was built in 1908. It is 27.9 feet (8.5 m) long and is situated in Archbald.

In the early 2000s, the Lackawanna River Watershed Conservation Plan recommended long-term management of the area in the vicinity of White Oak Run solely for conservation use. The conservation plan also recommended that Archbald and Jefferson Township include protection of the stream in their zoning plans, comprehensive plans, and other plans. Two reaches of the stream are on the List of Special Places and Natural Areas of the Lackawanna River Conservation Association. The stream is on the Watershed Restoration Priority List (for the Lackawanna River basin) of the Pennsylvania Department of Environmental Protection's Bureau of Abandoned Mine Reclamation.

On July 18, 2011, White Stone Quarry, LLC received a permit to discharge stormwater into White Oak Run.

== Biology ==
White Oak Run is designated as a Coldwater Fishery and a Migratory Fishery.

In its upper reaches, White Oak Run has a stable cover consisting of native forest and understory plants. Downstream of the tributary Indian Cave Creek, the stream has a riparian buffer consisting of hemlock and rhododendron. In its lower reaches, it also has a substantial riparian buffer, including some mature trees in the channel itself.

== See also ==
- Laurel Run (Lackawanna River), next tributary of the Lackawanna River going downriver
- Aylesworth Creek, next tributary of the Lackawanna River going upriver
- List of rivers of Pennsylvania
- List of tributaries of the Lackawanna River
