= Brace Brook =

Physical characteristics
- Source
  - location: hill in Mount Pleasant Township, Wayne County, Pennsylvania
  - elevation: between 2,040 and 2,060 feet (620 and 630 m)
- Mouth
  - location: Lackawanna River in Forest City, Susquehanna County, Pennsylvania
  - coordinates: 41°39′44″N 75°27′50″W
  - elevation: 1,473 ft (449 m)
- Length: 2.9 mi (4.7 km)
- Basin size: 2.99 mi^{2} (7.7 km^{2})

Basin features
- Progression: Lackawanna River → Susquehanna River → Chesapeake Bay
- Tributaries
  - left: one unnamed tributary

Brace Brook is a tributary of the Lackawanna River in Wayne County and Susquehanna County, in Pennsylvania, in the United States. It is approximately 2.9 miles (4.7 km) long and flows through Mount Pleasant Township and Clinton Township in Wayne County and Forest City in Susquehanna County. The watershed of the stream has an area of 2.99 square miles (7.7 km^{2}). The stream is not designated as impaired. It drains a portion of the Moosic Mountains. The surficial geology in its vicinity consists of alluvium, surface mining land, coal dumps, fill, Wisconsinan Till, and bedrock containing sandstone and shale. A reservoir known as the Brace Brook Reservoir is in the watershed. The stream's drainage basin is designated as a Coldwater Fishery and a Migratory Fishery.

== Course ==
Brace Brook begins on a hill in Mount Pleasant Township, Wayne County, not far from the border Wayne County/Susquehanna County line. It flows south-southeast and south for several tenths of a mile through a valley near Brace Brook Road before entering Clinton Township. The stream then flows south-southeast for several tenths of a mile before entering another valley and receiving an unnamed tributary from the left. It then turns west-southwest for several hundred feet before turning south-southeast and passing through the Brace Brook Reservoir. A short distance downstream of that reservoir, the stream turns south for several tenths of a mile. It then turns southwest for several tenths of a mile before turning south and then west-southwest. After a short distance, the stream exits Clinton Township and Wayne County and enters Forest City, in Susquehanna County. At this point, it immediately reaches its confluence with the Lackawanna River.

Brace Brook joins the Lackawanna River 36.96 miles (59.48 km) upriver of its mouth.

== Hydrology ==
Brace Brook is not designated as an impaired stream. In the early 1900s, the water quality in a reach of the watershed was described as "satisfactory".

The concentration of alkalinity in the watershed of Brace Brook is 23 milligrams per liter (0.023 oz/cu ft).

== Geography and geology ==
The elevation near the mouth of Brace Brook is 1,473 feet (449 m) above sea level. The elevation of the stream's source is between 2,040 and 2,060 feet (620 and 630 m) above sea level.

Brace Brook drains a portion of the western side of the Moosic Mountain Ridge. Part of the watershed is specifically located on Browndale Mountain, a section of the Moosic Mountains. The stream flows through a "spectacular" ravine downstream of the Brace Brook Reservoir. There is an above-ground water pipeline in the vicinity of Brace Brook.

Part of the watershed of Brace Brook is located upstream of the coal measures. However, there are culm piles at the stream's mouth. The surficial geology along the stream in its lower reaches mainly consists of alluvium, surface mining land, coal dumps, and fill. There are also areas of a glacial or resedimented till known as Wisconsinan Till nearby, and also bedrock consisting of sandstone and shale. Further upstream, the surficial geology in the stream's vicinity mainly consists of Wisconsinan Till, but there are patches of alluvium and peat bogs near the Brace Brook Reservoir. Bedrock consisting of sandstone and shale lines the sides of the stream's valley in its middle reaches.

== Watershed ==
The watershed of Brace Brook has an area of 2.99 square miles (7.7 km^{2}). The stream is entirely within the United States Geological Survey quadrangle of Forest City.

Brace Brook is a second-order stream.

The Brace Brook Reservoir, which is on Brace Brook, is used as an emergency water supply for Forest City by the Pennsylvania American Water Company.

== History and recreation ==
Brace Brook was entered into the Geographic Names Information System on August 2, 1979. Its identifier in the Geographic Names Information System is 1170106.

A reservoir on Brace Brook supplied Forest City with water via gravity as early as the early 1900s. In the early 1900s, the supervisors of Clinton Township, Wayne County requested permission to construct a bridge across the stream on a new road approximately 2 miles (3.2 km) northeast of Forest City. There are a number of old concrete structures on Brace Brook. Additionally, a water filtration plant is located to the south of the stream's mouth.

At the Pennsylvania Fish and Boat Commission meeting on April 15 and 16, 2013, the commission considered adding Brace Brook and a number of other streams to its list of wild trout streams.

There are unofficial walking paths along the side of the ravine through which Brace Brook flows. Additionally, the stream crosses the O&W Rail Trail via a culvert.

== Biology ==
The drainage basin of Brace Brook is designated as a Coldwater Fishery and a Migratory Fishery. The stream is designated by the Pennsylvania Fish and Boat Commission as Class A Wild Trout Waters for brook trout form its headwaters downstream to the inflow of the Brace Brook Reservoir.

== See also ==
- Meredith Brook, next tributary of the Lackawanna River going downriver
- East Branch Lackawanna River, next tributary of the Lackawanna River going upriver
- West Branch Lackawanna River, next tributary of the Lackawanna River going upriver
- List of rivers of Pennsylvania
- List of tributaries of the Lackawanna River
