= Endless Mountains =

Mountainous region in northeast Pennsylvania

Coordinates: 41.6218°N 76.0521°W

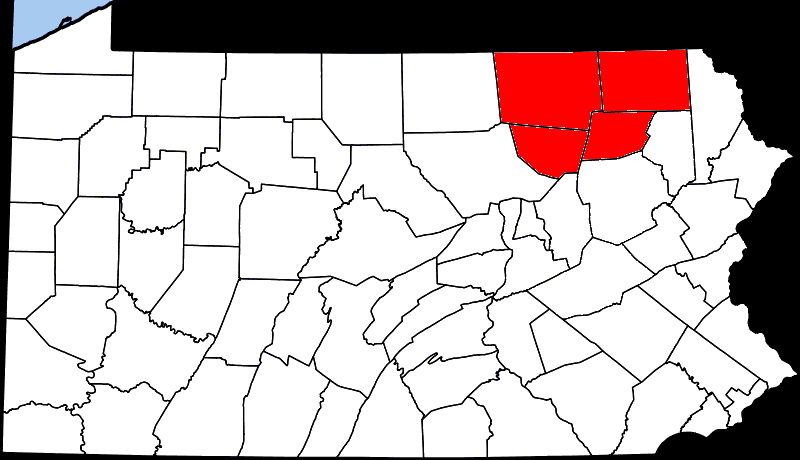
Counties (in red) in the Endless Mountains region of Northeastern Pennsylvania

The Endless Mountains is a geographical, geological, and cultural region in Northeastern Pennsylvania. The Endless Mountains region includes Bradford, Sullivan, Susquehanna, and Wyoming counties. The highest peak in the region is the North Knob of Elk Mountain at 2,693 feet (821 meters). The dissected plateau is a subrange of the Appalachian Mountains.

== Geography ==
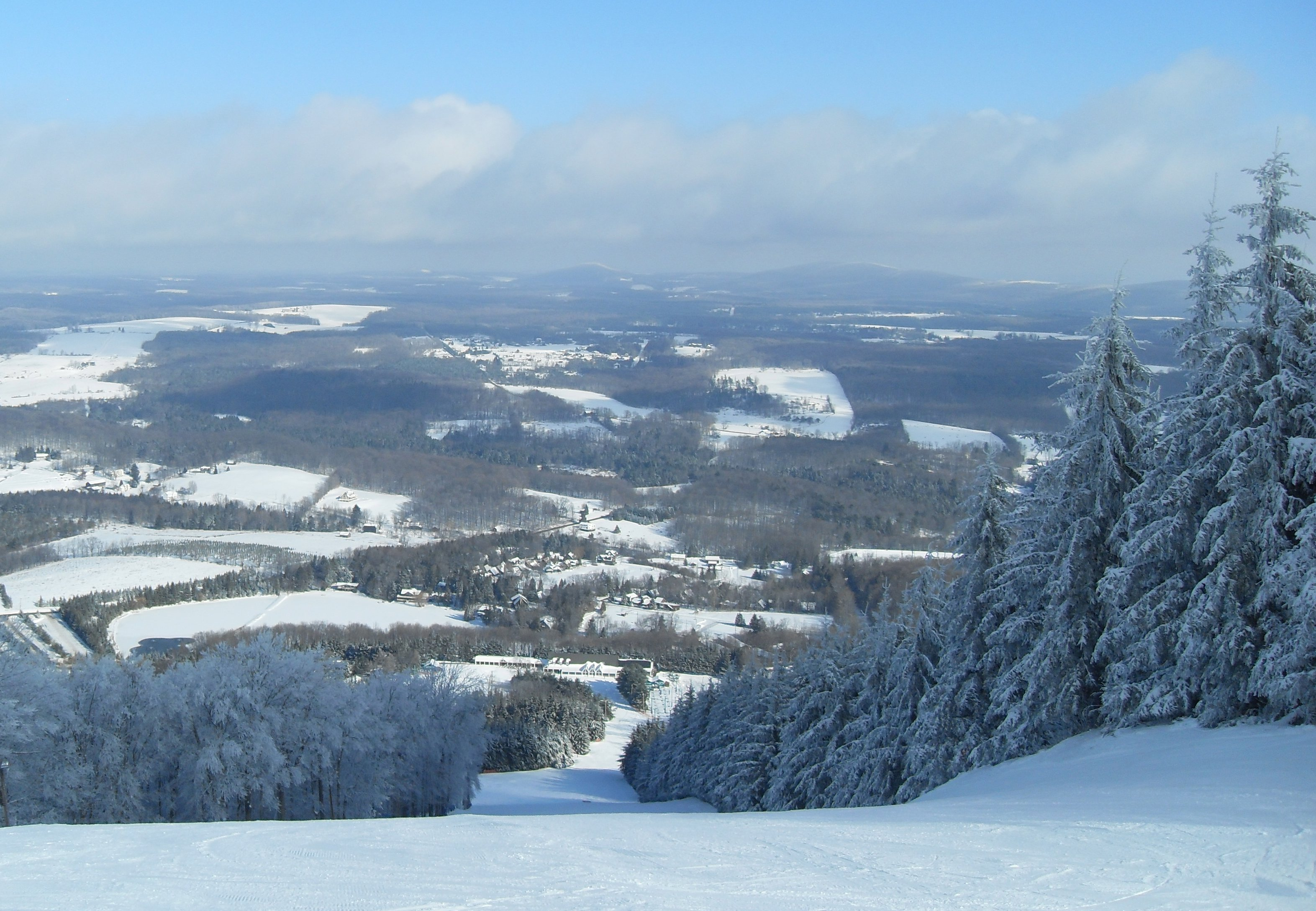
The Endless Mountains seen from Elk Mountain Ski Area in Herrick Township

Part of the Appalachian Mountains chain, the region does not consist of true mountains, geologically speaking, but instead a dissected plateau that is part of the Allegheny Plateau. The Catskill Mountains are the highest expression of the plateau, located to the east of the Endless Mountains, and separated from them by the Delaware River.

The current geography was slightly modified during the last ice age by the Wisconsin Glacier about 15,000 years ago. Glacial striations can be found on the rocks of some of the high ridges, but the area was at the margin of the ice sheet, and the impact was much less than in New York just to the north.

The mountains are made up of sedimentary rocks (mostly sandstone and shales, with a little conglomerate) that were part of a lowland that collected sediments eroded from mountains to the southeast in Mississippian and Pennsylvanian geologic time. The area has been uplifted and lowered several times. The highest points are all nearly the same elevation, establishing that the area had once been eroded into a nearly level peneplain, which has since been uplifted. The present Susquehanna River established its meandering course during that time, when it was a mature stream on a topography of very low relief. When the area was uplifted, the river's bends were preserved as incised meanders. The large river cut a deep valley and established a low baseline for its tributaries, which then cut the plateau into the rugged hills of the present day.

== History ==
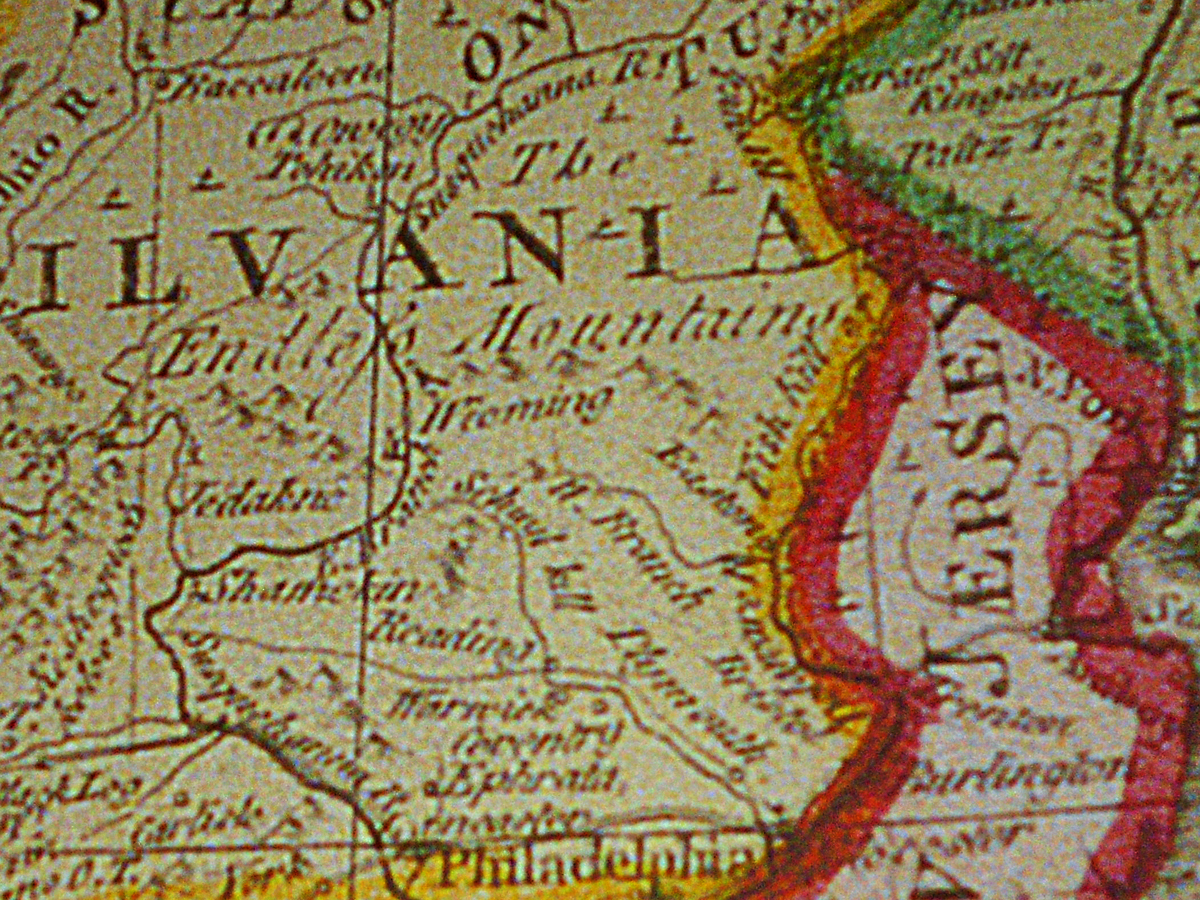
A 1756 map of the Endless Mountains on display at the Smithsonian Institution's National Museum of American History in Washington, D.C.

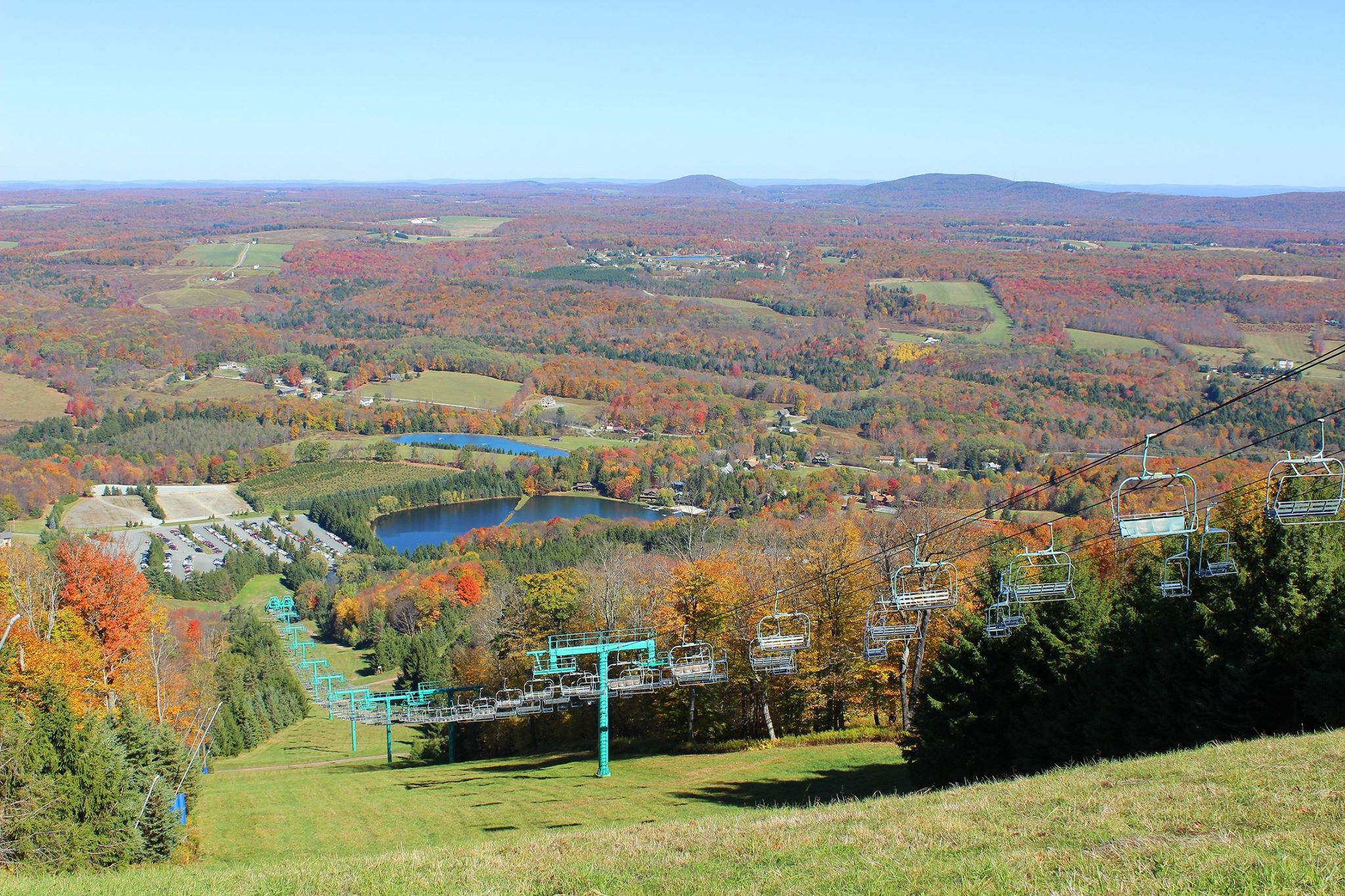
An autumn view from Elk Mountain Ski Resort in the Endless Mountains

Several Native American bands settled the area in prehistoric times. By the early colonial period, Munsee-Lenape, Susquehannock, and Iroquois peoples were the principal occupants of the region. The majority of the local place names were derived from the Munsee-Lenape, however; places like Lock-ah Hanna (Lackawanna or Sand River), Tunk Hanna Unk (Tunkhannock or Bend River Place), Why-ohm Ing (Wyoming or Food Place), Min Nees Unk (Minisink), Toe-be Hanna (Tobyhanna or Cool River), Mesh-op Ing (Meshoppen), Why-ah-loose Ing (Wyalusing), Schick-shin Ing (Shickshinny), and Mawsch Unk (Bear Place, present-day Jim Thorpe) are examples. The Munsee and other native peoples like the Shawnee, Nanticoke, Conoy, and Tutelo were evicted by the terms of the 1768 Treaty of Fort Stanwix, which was between the Iroquois League and the British Crown.

After 1768, hundreds of British, Irish, and German families flooded in from New England, New York, New Jersey, and Pennsylvania to occupy lands purchased from the Susquehanna and Connecticut Land companies of Connecticut. These settlements eventually led to armed conflict with the Penn proprietors (William Penn's sons, Richard and Thomas, and his grandson, John), who also claimed the land. (See Pennamite Wars). During the American Revolution in 1778, a combined British, Tory, Iroquois, Munsee, and Lenape force attacked the Wyoming Valley settlers on the eastern edge of this region, and killed many of the settlers. Washington sent Major General John Sullivan on a campaign to destroy the Iroquois threat by a "scorched earth" drive up the Susquehanna and Chemung Rivers into central and western New York.

The region's economy was formerly based on mining, lumbering (especially of hemlock for tanning) and industry but is now largely agricultural with forestry and tourism contributing to the economic base. Much of the land is steep, but there are a few good farms on rolling hilltops or valley bottoms; many of these farms have been occupied by Mennonite and Amish people who have migrated northward as their traditional homelands became developed.

Quarrying remains an important local industry with the region's high quality blue stone being particularly valuable. The area is on the edge of Pennsylvania's Coal Region, with some minor veins of coal extending into the area.

== Popular culture ==
Camptown, Pennsylvania in the Endless Mountains is featured in the lyrics of "Camptown Races", an 1850 song by Stephen Foster.

== See also ==
- Elk Mountain Ski Area
- List of subranges of the Appalachian Mountains
