= Clarks Creek (Lackawanna River tributary) =

Stream in Wayne County, Pennsylvania, US

Clarks Creek UNT 28600 of the Lackawanna River

Physical characteristics
- Source
  - location: valley near Ravinikar Road in Clinton Township, Wayne County, Pennsylvania
  - elevation: between 1,780 and 1,800 feet (540 and 550 m)
- Mouth
  - location: Lackawanna River in Clinton Township, Wayne County, Pennsylvania
  - coordinates: 41°38′36″N 75°27′30″W
  - elevation: 1,407 ft (429 m)
- Length: 2.2 mi (3.5 km)
- Basin size: 3.37 mi^{2} (8.7 km^{2})

Basin features
- Progression: Lackawanna River → Susquehanna River → Chesapeake Bay
- Tributaries
  - left: one unnamed tributary
  - right: one unnamed tributary

Clarks Creek (also known as UNT 28600 of the Lackawanna River) is a tributary of the Lackawanna River in Wayne County, Pennsylvania, in the United States. It is approximately 2.2 miles (3.5 km) long and flows through Clinton Township. The watershed of the creek has an area of 3.37 square miles (8.7 km^{2}). The creek has no named tributaries, but does have two unnamed tributaries. It is not considered to be impaired. The pH of the creek is slightly acidic and the concentration of water hardness is 12 milligrams per liter. Metals such as magnesium, calcium, chromium, manganese, iron, nickel, copper, zinc, cadmium, aluminum, lead, and arsenic have been observed in the creek's waters in various amounts. It is a freestone stream in the Lackawanna Valley. The surficial geology in its vicinity mainly consists of Wisconsinan Till, Wisconsinan Ice-Contact Stratified Drift, fill, surface mining lands, and bedrock.

Clarks Creek is a second-order stream. Most of its watershed is forested, but there are some residential areas and roads as well. The creek was surveyed by the Pennsylvania Boat Commission in 1997. It is currently designated as Exceptional Value waters and a Migratory Fishery, but was historically a Coldwater Fishery and a Migratory Fishery. Brook trout and brown trout inhabit the creek, but the former is far more common. Five other species of fish have also been observed in its waters. Additionally, the creek has a high level of macroinvertebrate diversity, including a number of pollution-intolerant taxa.

== Course ==
Clarks Creek begins in a valley near Ravinikar Road in Clinton Township. It flows southwest for approximately a mile before turning south-southwest and then west-southwest, exiting the valley. At this point, the creek receives an unnamed tributary from the left and flows in a west-northwesterly direction for a few tenths of a mile. It then flows in a west-southwesterly direction for a few tenths of a mile and receives an unnamed tributary from the right as it passes through Forest City Station. The creek then turns south for several tenths of a mile before turning southwest. Several hundred feet further downstream, it reaches its confluence with the Lackawanna River.

Clarks Creek joins the Lackawanna River 34.8 miles (56.0 km) upriver of its mouth.

=== Tributaries ===
Clarks Creek has no named tributaries. However, it does have two unnamed tributaries. The upper tributary is approximately 0.9 miles (1.4 km) long and the lower tributary is approximately 1.5 miles (2.4 km) long. These tributaries are known in the Lackawanna River Watershed Conservation Plan as "Unnamed trib 1" and "Unnamed trib 2". However, one tributary of the creek was known as Trout Creek in the early 1900s.

== Hydrology ==
There are no surface water withdrawals for the purpose of public water supply within the watershed. Additionally, there are no NPDES permitted surface discharges in the creek's drainage basin. The creek is not designated as an impaired stream.

On April 24, 2002, the water temperature of Clarks Creek in its middle reaches was 7.8 °C (46.0 °F). The conductivity of the creek was 44 micromhos and the pH was 6.7. The concentration of acidity was 1.4 milligrams per liter and the alkalinity concentration was 5 milligrams per liter. The concentration of water hardness was 12 milligrams per liter. Less than 2 milligrams per liter of suspended solids were observed, but 66 milligrams per liter of total dissolved solids were recorded.

The concentration of nitrogen from ammonia in the middle reaches of Clarks Creek was measured to be less than 0.02 milligrams per liter. The concentration of NO_{2} in the form of nitrogen was less than 0.01 milligrams per liter and the concentration of NO_{3} in the form of nitrogen was 0.17 milligrams per liter. The total phosphorus concentration was less than 0.01 milligrams per liter. The sulfate concentration was less than 20 milligrams per liter and the chlorine concentration was 2 milligrams per liter.

The concentration of magnesium in Clarks Creek in its middle reaches was found to be 0.89 milligrams per liter on April 24, 2002. The calcium concentration was 3.3 milligrams per liter. The concentration of chromium was less than 50 micrograms per liter, the manganese concentration was 13 micrograms per liter, and the iron concentration was 29 micrograms per liter. The concentration of nickel was less than 4 micrograms per liter, the concentration of copper was less than 4.0 micrograms per liter, the zinc concentration was less than 5 micrograms per liter, and the cadmium concentration was less than 0.2 micrograms per liter. There was 66 micrograms per liter of aluminum, less than 4.0 of arsenic, and less than 1.0 of lead.

In the early 1900s, Clarks Creek was free of mine water and culm pollution as far downstream as the confluence of the tributary "Trout Creek".

== Geography and geology ==
The elevation near the mouth of Clarks Creek is 1,407 feet (429 m) above sea level. The elevation of the creek's source is between 1,780 and 1,800 feet (540 and 550 m) above sea level. The creek's gradient ranges from moderate to high. The lowest points in the watershed, near the creek's mouth, have an elevation of approximately 1,420 feet (430 m) above sea level. The highest points, in the northeastern part of the watershed, have an elevation of approximately 2,240 feet (680 m) above sea level.

Clarks Creek is a freestone stream. It is located in the Lackawanna Valley. The creek's channel was once modified, causing it to skirt a hill to the south and reach its confluence with the Lackawanna River a short distance downstream of its former mouth. A portion of the western side of the Moosic Mountains are in the watershed of the creek.

The surficial geology along Clarks Creek for most of its length consists of a glacial or resedimented till known as Wisconsinan Till. However, patches of fill, Wisconsinan Ice-Contact Stratified Drift, and surface mining land occur near the creek's mouth. Wisconsinan Ice-Contact Stratified Drift contains stratified sand, gravel, and some boulders. Surface mining land consists of linear pits and piles of waste rock. The pits are generally several hundred feet long and less than 100 feet (30 m) deep. Additionally, some areas of bedrock consisting of sandstone and shale occur in the surficial geology near the creek, but not right alongside it.

== Watershed ==
The watershed of Clarks Creek has an area of 3.37 square miles (8.7 km^{2}). There are 4.59 miles (7.39 km) of streams in the watershed. Clarks Creek is entirely within the United States Geological Survey quadrangle of Forest City. Clarks Creek is a second-order stream.

The main land use in the watershed of Clarks Creek is forested slopes. However, low-density residential land occurs in some areas of the watershed, along paved roads and in the watershed's lower reaches.

== History ==
Clarks Creek was entered into the Geographic Names Information System on January 1, 1990. Its identifier in the Geographic Names Information System is 1202342. The creek is also known as "UNT 28600 of the Lackawanna River".

The New York, Ontario and Western Railroad historically crossed Clarks Creek. Coal mining was also historically done in the area. The mining occurred so close to the surface that the mines were in danger of flooding. The Pennsylvania Fish and Boat Commission surveyed Clarks Creek in 1997, from its mouth to a point 560 metres (1,840 ft) upstream. A survey of the creek was also done in April 2002.

Clarks Creek used to be designated as a Coldwater Fishery and a Migratory Fishery. A petition was eventually filed to re-designate the creek as a High-Quality Coldwater Fishery and a Migratory Fishery. However, the officially recommended re-designation was Exceptional Value waters and Migratory Fishery.

== Biology ==
The drainage basin of Clarks Creek is designated as Exceptional Value waters and a Migratory Fishery. Wild trout naturally reproduce in the creek from its headwaters downstream to its mouth. In the 1997 survey of Clarks Creek by the Pennsylvania Fish and Boat Commission, seven fish species were observed in the creek. These included naturally reproducing brook trout and brown trout, through the former were far more common than the latter. The total wild trout biomass was 23.8 kilograms (52 lb) per 1 hectare (2.5 acres). The creek is one of the few remaining native trout streams in the Lackawanna Valley. Other fish species observed in the creek in the 1997 survey included eastern blacknose dace, creek chub, longnose dace, sunfish, and white sucker.

Clarks Creek has a high level of biodiversity in macroinvertebrates. This includes several genera sensitive to pollution, such as Epeorus, Leuctra, and Amphinemura. In 2002, 77 individuals of a 206-individual subsample from the creek's lower reaches were mayflies. A total of 50 individuals were stoneflies, 42 were true flies, and 21 were caddisflies. 13 were aquatic beetles, 2 were dragonflies/damselflies, and 1 was of a non-insect taxon (Cambaridae). In a 217-individual subsample from the creek's middle reaches, 79 were mayflies, 51 were true flies, 37 were stoneflies, and 28 were caddisflies. An additional 17 were aquatic beetles, two were of a non-insect taxon (Cambaridae), two were dobsonflies/fishflies, and one was a dragonfly/damselfly.

Habitat assessment scores for Clarks Creek were found to range from 188 to 198 (within the optimal range) in one stream survey. The former value occurred in the creek's middle reaches, while the latter value occurred in its lower reaches. In its lower reaches, the creek received the highest score on instream cover (19 points) and the lowest score on channel flow status (12 points). In its middle reaches, it received the highest scores of epifaunal substrate and riffle frequency (19 points each) and the lowest score on riparian vegetation zone width (9 points).

The taxa richness value of Clarks Creek is 24 in its lower reaches and 27 in its middle reaches. The modified EPT (Ephemeroptera, Plecoptera, and Trichoptera) Index value of the creek is 15 in both its lower and middle reaches. The modified Hilsenhoff Biotic Index value of the creek is 2.11 in its lower reaches and 2.42 in its middle reaches. The total biological condition score is 38 out of 40 in the creek's lower reaches and 40 out of 40 in its middle reaches.

== See also ==
- Rogers Brook, next tributary of the Lackawanna River going downriver
- Meredith Brook, next tributary of the Lackawanna River going upriver
- List of rivers of Pennsylvania
- List of tributaries of the Lackawanna River
