= Laurel Run (Lackawanna River tributary) =

Laurel Run Laurel Run No. 3

Physical characteristics
- Source
  - location: mountain in Jefferson Township, Lackawanna County, Pennsylvania
  - elevation: between 2,160 and 2,180 feet (660 and 660 m)
- Mouth
  - location: Lackawanna River in Archbald, Lackawanna County, Pennsylvania
  - coordinates: 41°29′24″N 75°32′31″W
  - elevation: 838 ft (255 m)
- Length: 3.6 mi (5.8 km)
- Basin size: 2.72 mi^{2} (7.0 km^{2})

Basin features
- Progression: Lackawanna River → Susquehanna River → Chesapeake Bay
- Tributaries
  - left: one unnamed tributary

Laurel Run (also known as Laurel Run No. 3) is a tributary of the Lackawanna River in Lackawanna County, Pennsylvania, in the United States. It is approximately 3.6 miles (5.8 km) long and flows through Jefferson Township and Archbald. The watershed of the stream has an area of 2.72 square miles (7.0 km^{2}). The stream is somewhat affected by mine drainage. A reservoir known as the Laurel Run Reservoir is in the watershed and is dammed by the Cawley Dam. Waterfalls, ravines, ledges, and slides occur on some reaches of the stream. Additionally, the stream is a source of flooding in the borough of Archbald. Its drainage basin is designated as a Coldwater Fishery and a Migratory Fishery.

== Course ==
Laurel Run begins on a mountain in Jefferson Township. It flows southwest for a short distance before turning west for a few tenths of a mile. The stream then turns west-northwest for more than a mile, flowing down the mountain and entering Archbald. In Archbald, it turns west-southwest for several tenths of a mile and enters a ravine, where it receives an unnamed tributary from the left and passes through the Laurel Run Reservoir. A short distance further downstream, the stream turns northwest for a few tenths of a mile and crosses US Route 6 before turning west. After a few tenths of a mile, it leaves the ravine and after another few tenths of a mile, it reaches its confluence with the Lackawanna River.

Laurel Run joins the Lackawanna River 21.82 miles (35.12 km) upriver of its mouth.

=== Tributaries ===
Laurel Run has no named tributaries. However, it does have one unnamed tributary, which is known as "Unnamed trib 1". This tributary is 1.5 miles (2.4 km) long.

== Hydrology ==
Some flow loss occurs in Laurel Run near its culvert under the Robert Casey Highway.

Some mine drainage flows into Laurel Run just downstream of the Laurel Run Reservoir via small seeps. However, iron oxide is only deposited along a few hundred feet of the stream and mine reclamation efforts have been done in the area.

Upstream of its confluence with the Lackawanna River, the peak annual discharge has a 10 percent chance of reaching 423 cubic feet per second. It has a 2 percent chance of reaching 719 cubic feet per second and a 1 percent chance of reaching 867 cubic feet per second. The peak annual discharge has a 0.2 percent chance of reaching 1275 cubic feet per second.

At its confluence with the Lackawanna River, the peak annual discharge has a 10 percent chance of reaching 48 cubic feet per second. It has a 2 percent chance of reaching 110 cubic feet per second and a 1 percent chance of reaching 150 cubic feet per second. The peak annual discharge has a 0.2 percent chance of reaching 300 cubic feet per second.

The borough of Archbald once requested a permit to discharge stormwater into Laurel Run and a number of other streams. In the early 1900s, the stream was clear of culm and other forms of pollution as far downstream as the Olyphant Water Company's dam. Near the dam, two streams of mine water from the Humbert Coal Company discharged into the stream, but this had little effect on its water quality.

== Geography and geology ==
The elevation near the mouth of Laurel Run is 838 feet (255 m) above sea level. The elevation of the stream's source is between 2,160 and 2,180 feet (660 and 660 m) above sea level.

A morphologic site known as the Laurel Run Sinuosity occurs in the watershed of Laurel Run in Archbald. Additionally, the Francis Cawley Dam is in the steam's watershed. This dam impounds the Laurel Run Reservoir, a former water supply reservoir on the stream. A wetland known as the Laruel Run Marshes occurs in the watershed in Jefferson Township.

From the Cawley Dam downstream to the culvert under the Robert Casey Highway, a 0.3-mile (0.5-kilometer) reach of Laurel Run has a high gradient and its course contains waterfalls, ravines, ledges, and slides. The stream is relatively unimpacted in this reach, despite historic mining nearby.

The headwaters of Laurel Run are in a wetland in the Moosic Mountains. The stream is a mountain stream.

== Watershed ==
The watershed of Laurel Run has an area of 2.72 square miles (7.0 km^{2}). The mouth of the stream is in the United States Geological Survey quadrangle of Olyphant. However, its source is in the quadrangle of Lake Ariel.

Laurel Run is a second-order stream.

Upstream of the Robert Casey Highway, Laurel Run and its riparian area are mostly undisturbed, undeveloped, and on private property. However, downstream of the highway, the stream and its riparian area are impacted by waste mine rock from historical mining operations. There is some development in the upper reaches of the watershed, along Salem Mt. Road. However, the impacts caused by this development are likely to be small.

The upper reaches of the watershed of Laurel Run are in Pennsylvania State Game Lands, minimizing the chance of impact to this stream reach. The right-of-way of an electrical utility line also traverses the watershed.

Laurel Run is a source of flooding in the borough of Archbald. Property owners along the stream have had their basements flooded by it.

== History ==
Laurel Run was entered into the Geographic Names Information System on August 2, 1979. Its identifier in the Geographic Names Information System is 1199006.

Archbald, which is on Laurel Run, was first settled in 1845 and was incorporated in 1875. Waterworks were drawing water from the stream as early as 1875. It was historically used as a water supply for Archbald. After a flooding event in 1972, a reach of Laurel Run was moved and reconstructed.

In the early 2000s, the Lackawanna River Watershed Conservation Plan recommended that Laurel Run be managed solely for conservation use. The conservation plan also recommended that Jefferson Township and Archbald include protection of the stream in their zoning plans. In the early 2000s, the Theta Company owned some land in the stream's vicinity.

As of the early 2000s, Laurel Run is on the Watershed Restoration Priority List of the Pennsylvania Department of Environmental Protection's Bureau of Abandoned Mine Restoration. The Pennsylvania Department of Environmental Protection once created a Mine Drainage Pollution Abatement Project for the stream.

== Biology ==
The drainage basin of Laurel Run is designated as a Coldwater Fishery and a Migratory Fishery. Wild trout naturally reproduce in the creek from its headwaters downstream to its mouth.

Upstream of the Laurel Run Reservoir, the riparian buffer of Laurel Run consists of native trees and understory. From the Cawley Dam downstream to the Robert Casey Highway, the stream has an "impressive" rhododendron growth in its riparian buffer. For this reason, this stream reach is on the Special Places and Natural Areas list of the Lackawanna River Corridor Association. Further downstream, the riparian buffer consists mainly of successional vegetation.

== See also ==
- Grassy Island Creek, next tributary of the Lackawanna River going downstream
- White Oak Run (Lackawanna River), next tributary of the Lackawanna River going upstream
- List of rivers of Pennsylvania
- List of tributaries of the Lackawanna River
