= Grassy Island Creek =

Physical characteristics
- Source
  - location: mountain in Jefferson Township, Lackawanna County, Pennsylvania
  - elevation: between 2,140 and 2,160 feet (650 and 660 m)
- Mouth
  - location: Lackawanna River in Jessup, Lackawanna County, Pennsylvania
  - coordinates: 41°28′47″N 75°33′38″W
  - elevation: 830 ft (250 m)
- Length: 4.4 mi (7.1 km)
- Basin size: 5.42 mi^{2} (14.0 km^{2})

Basin features
- Progression: Lackawanna River → Susquehanna River → Chesapeake Bay
- Tributaries
  - left: four unnamed tributaries
  - right: one unnamed tributary

Grassy Island Creek is a tributary of the Lackawanna River in Lackawanna County, Pennsylvania, in the United States. It is approximately 4.4 miles (7.1 km) long and flows through Jefferson Township and Jessup. The watershed of the creek has an area of 5.42 square miles (14.0 km^{2}). The lower reaches of the creek are impaired, but the upper reaches are not impaired. It is an intermittent stream during the summer, but its flow has been recorded as being as high as 116,553.21 gallons per minute. Some manganese, acidity, and alkalinity are also in the creek. It is in the Appalachian Mountain section of the ridge and valley physiographic province. The main rock formations in the creek's watershed are made of sandstone and interbedded sedimentary rocks. Some reservoirs are in the watershed at the boundary between the Pocono Formation and the Llewellyn Formation.

The watershed of Grassy Island Creek is mainly forested, but there are also residential lands and abandoned mine lands. The creek is a source of flooding in Jessup. The remains of collieries such as the Sterrick Creek Colliery, the Mount Jessup Colliery, and the Pompey Colliery also occur in its vicinity. In 1996, the creek's channel failed, causing it to wash more than 30,000 cubic yards of culm into the Lackawanna River. In the 2000s, various channel repair efforts were carried out. A proposed natural gas-fired power plant intends to dump waste water into the creek.

== Course ==
Grassy Island Creek begins on a mountain in Jefferson Township. It flows southwest for several tenths of a mile, until it reaches a valley. In the valley, the creek turns northwest for more than a mile, receiving two unnamed tributaries from the left and entering Jessup. In Jessup, it turns south-southwest for a few tenths of a mile and enters the Olyphant Reservoir Number Two, where it receives an unnamed tributary from the right. From the southern side of the reservoir, the creek turns west-southwest for a short distance, receiving an unnamed tributary from the left and entering the Olyphant Reservoir Number One. From this reservoir, the creek flows northwest for several tenths of a mile, receiving an unnamed tributary from the left. It eventually turns west and crosses US Route 6. Soon afterwards, it leaves the valley and turns north. Several tenths of a mile further downstream, the creek reaches its confluence with the Lackawanna River.

Grassy Island Creek joins the Lackawanna River 20.36 miles (32.77 km) upriver of its mouth.

=== Tributaries ===
Although Grassy Island Creek has no named tributaries, has several unnamed ones: "Unnamed trib 1", "trib from Olyphant Res. No. 3", "Unnamed trib 2", and "Unnamed trib 3". Their lengths are 0.8 miles (1.3 km), 0.3 miles (0.48 km), 0.5 miles (0.80 km), and 0.5 miles (0.80 km), respectively.

== Hydrology ==
The lower reaches of Grassy Island Creek are designated as impaired, although the upper reaches are unimpaired. The causes of the impairment include pH and metals. The source of the impairment is abandoned mine drainage. An unnamed tributary is impaired, with a cause of flow alterations and a source of abandoned mine drainage.

In a 2002 study, the average discharge of Grassy Island Creek at its mouth was 6011.296 gallons per minute. The discharge ranged from 261.22 to 16,553.21 gallons per minute. However, during the heat of summer, it is an intermittent stream. A 1952 report estimated that the rate of surface seepage into mine workings was 8.35 gallons per minute per inch of rain. The report also estimated that the rate of streambed seepage into mine workings was 17.86 gallons per minute per inch of rain. In 2002, the pH of the creek ranged from 4.8 to 5.5, with an average of 5.05.

The load of manganese in Grassy Island Creek is 4.3 pounds (2.0 kg) per day and the manganese concentration is 0.06 milligrams per liter. It meets its total maximum daily load requirements. Iron and aluminum were not detected in the creek during its total maximum daily load study. However, the daily load of acidity is 955.5 pounds (433.4 kg), considerably higher than the total maximum daily load of 296.1 pounds (134.3 kg) per day. The average acidity concentration is 13.23 milligrams per liter and the concentration ranges from 8 to 18 milligrams per liter. The concentration of alkalinity in the creek averages 7.33 milligrams per liter and the daily load of alkalinity is 529.4 pounds (240.1 kg). The alkalinity concentration ranges from 6.4 to 9.4 milligrams per liter.

Grassy Island Creek experiences measurable flow loss. At one point, it lost all of its base flow to deep mines except during storm events. Additionally, culm and silt from mining operations have accumulated along the creek's banks and in its floodplain. In the early 1900s, the creek was clear in its upper reaches. However, pollution at the Sunnyside Colliery turned it black and filled it with culm. More mine water was discharged into the creek at the Dolph Colliery. Slush from the Sterrick Creek Colliery and the North American Washery also discharged into the creek.

The peak annual discharge of Grassy Island Creek at its mouth has a 10 percent chance of reaching 550 cubic feet per second. It has a 2 percent chance of reaching 1190 cubic feet per second and a 1 percent chance of reaching 1610 cubic feet per second. The peak annual discharge has a 0.2 percent chance of reaching 3180 cubic feet per second.

Leeward Construction once requested a permit to discharge stormwater associated with construction activities into Grassy Island Creek, as did Seefried Properties, Inc.

== Geography and geology ==
The elevation near the mouth of Grassy Island Creek is 830 feet (250 m) above sea level. The elevation of the creek's source is between 2,140 and 2,160 feet (650 and 660 m) above sea level.

Grassy Island Creek is in the Appalachian Mountain section of the ridge and valley pysiographic province. The geography of the creek's watershed consists of long, steep ridges with valleys in between. This is similar to the geography of the Lackawanna River watershed as a whole, but on a smaller scale.

The headwaters of Grassy Island Creek are in mountain springs in the Moosic Mountains. In some reaches, the creek flows through steep ravines that are owned by the Theta Corporation, the Pennsylvania Game Commission, and The Nature Conservancy, as of 2001. Downstream of the Olyphant Reservoir Number One, the creek becomes significantly impacted by historic anthracite mining. Additional ravines and ledges are located along the creek downstream of the Robert Casey Highway. The most severely impacted section of the creek is its lower reaches. In this reach, the streambed is lined with knapped stone to reduce flow loss. There are also retaining walls in some areas of this reach.

The main rock types in the watershed of Grassy Island Creek are sandstone and interbedded sedimentary rocks. The former underlies 87 percent of the watershed, while the latter underlies the remaining 13 percent. The uplands of the creek's watershed are on poorly drained, rocky soil. All other parts of the watershed are either on developed land and impervious surfaces, or mining lands with rapid permeability. A total of 0.821 square miles (2.13 km^{2}) and 5,600 feet (1,700 m) of the creek's length are on coal measures.

A culm dump known as the Rose Pile is situated on the floodplain at the mouth of Grassy Island Creek. This culm dump is 100 feet (30 m) high and covers an area of 30 acres (12 ha). It has a volume of 200,000 cubic yards. The creek passes through the Robert Casey Highway via a 400-foot concrete box culvert through a mound of fill, but reappears on the surface at Sunnyside Road.

Like many Lackawanna River tributaries in the area, Grassy Island Creek reaches the boundary between the Pocono Formation and the Llewellyn Formation at 1,500 feet (460 m) above sea level. Reservoirs in the creek's watershed are located near this boundary. Near Pennsylvania Route 247, it reaches a ledge of sandstone, shale, and anthracite of the Llewellyn Formation. This ledge is 40 feet (12 m) high and has a 4-foot-thick (1.2-meter-thick) anthracite seam at its base. The creek makes a 90-degree turn at this ledge.

== Watershed ==
Grassy Island Creek"s watershed occupies an area of 5.42 square miles (14.0 km^{2}). The creek is entirely within the United States Geological Survey quadrangle of Olyphant. The vast majority (89 percent) of the watershed of Grassy Island Creek is on forested land. The remaining 11 percent consists of residential development and abandoned mining lands.

Reservoirs in its watershed include Olyphant Reservoir Number One, Olyphant Reservoir Number Two, and Olyphant Reservoir Number Three in Jessup.

Grassy Island Creek is a major source of flooding in the borough of Jessup.

== History and recreation ==
Grassy Island Creek was entered into the Geographic Names Information System on August 2, 1979. Its identifier in the Geographic Names Information System is 1198822.

The remains of a coal town known as Sunnyside can be found near Grassy Island Creek. Historically, large collieries operated in upland areas near the creek. These collieries included the Sterrick Creek Colliery, the Mount Jessup Colliery, and the Pompey Colliery. Additionally, the Winton Water Company constructed three water supply reservoirs in the watershed of Grassy Island Creek in the 1890s. Part of the creek's streambed and banks were reclaimed by the Works Progress Administration in the 1930s. By the early 2000s, these reservoirs were owned by the Theta Corporation and were no longer used as a water supply. The Olyphant Reservoir Number Two was breached by the Pennsylvania Gas and Water Company in 1994, partly for dam safety reasons.

During a January 19, 1996 ice flood, the channel of Grassy Island Creek failed. This failure contributed to a washout of the Rose Pile, which caused more than 30,000 cubic yards of culm to erode into the Lackawanna River. In the early 2000s, a trail project known as the Grassy Island Creek Greenway was proposed in the Lackawanna River Watershed Conservation Plan. The conservation plan recommended managing the land near the creek's headwaters exclusively for conservation use.

As of the early 2000s, Grassy Island Creek is on the Watershed Restoration Priority List of the Lackawanna River Corridor Association and the Pennsylvania Department of Environmental Protection's Bureau of Abandoned Mine Restoration. Around this time, the first phase of a restoration effort by the Bureau of Abandoned Mine Restoration was in design. The project involved riparian and drainage enhancement, as well as surface reclamation, along 1 mile (1.6 km) of the creek and over an area of approximately 400 acres (160 ha). In 2001, the channel of the creek at its mouth was relocated in a project carried out by the Lackawanna County Conservation District. A 2004 project to realign the creek resulted in a highly unstable streambank. One reason for this was that vegetation was unable to grow on the mine silts, red ash, and shale that was used. Such materials were also easily washed away by the creek's flow. Further repair work was done in 2005, but the channel never gained full stability. It did, however, survive a June 2006 storm. Between 2009 and December 2012, further work was done on the unstable parts of the channel. The project involved adding riprap to some reaches. The channel survived a localized flood of 5 to 6 inches (13 to 15 cm) of rain in 2013 with only light damage.

As of 2001, the prospects for the restoration and conservation of Grassy Island Creek are "excellent". There are no active mining permits in the watershed of the creek.

In 2015, a proposed natural gas power plant drew opposition for planning to discharge waste in to Grassy Island Creek. Invenergy estimated that 400,000 to 600,000 gallons of water would be discharged into the creek per day. Bernard McGurl, director of the Lackawanna River Corridor Association, stated that the said association would monitor the creek for any effects. However, proponents of the power plant, such as conservationist Charlie Charlesworth, pointed out that this would also give the creek a constant flow.

== Biology ==
The drainage basin of Grassy Island Creek from its source downstream to the 1,100 feet (340 m) contour line is designated as a High-Quality Coldwater Fishery and a Migratory Fishery. From this point downstream to its mouth, the drainage basin is designated as a Coldwater Fishery and a Migratory Fishery. Wild trout naturally reproduce in the creek from its headwaters downstream to its mouth.

As of the early 2000s, some noxious weeds have been introduced into the watershed of Grassy Island Creek. Hemlocks occur in the ravines that the creek flows through. Downstream of the Robert Casey Highway, some groves of rhododendrons and laurels remain along the creek. There are also plant species such as hemlock, chestnut, and white oak in this reach.

== See also ==
- Sterry Creek, next tributary of the Lackawanna River going downstream
- Laurel Run (Lackawanna River), next tributary of the Lackawanna River going upstream
- List of rivers of Pennsylvania
- List of tributaries of the Lackawanna River
