= Aylesworth Creek =

Physical characteristics
- Source
  - location: small lake in a valley in Carbondale Township, Lackawanna County, Pennsylvania
  - elevation: between 1,560 and 1,580 feet (480 and 480 m)
- Mouth
  - location: Lackawanna River in Archbald, Lackawanna County, Pennsylvania
  - coordinates: 41°31′13″N 75°32′42″W
  - elevation: 925 ft (282 m)
- Length: 4.9 mi (7.9 km)
- Basin size: 6.73 mi^{2} (17.4 km^{2})
- Discharge
  - average: 8,747.82 US gal/min (33.1141 m^{3}/min) (at site AC1)

Basin features
- Progression: Lackawanna River → Susquehanna River → Chesapeake Bay
- Tributaries
  - left: three unnamed tributaries

Aylesworth Creek is a tributary of the Lackawanna River in Lackawanna County, Pennsylvania, in the United States. It is approximately 4.9 miles (7.9 km) long and flows through Carbondale Township and the boroughs of Mayfield and Archbald. The watershed of the creek has an area of 6.73 square miles (17.4 km^{2}). Part of the creek is impaired by abandoned mine drainage and/or resource extraction. The creek tends to be slightly acidic, but its iron, manganese, and aluminum concentrations do not need reduction to meet its total maximum daily load requirements. Its watershed is in the Appalachian Mountain section of the ridge and valley physiographic province. The headwaters of the creek are in the Moosic Mountains. The rock formations in the watershed mainly consist of interbedded sedimentary rock and sandstone.

Lakes in the watershed of Aylesworth Creek include the Edgerton Reservoir and Aylesworth Creek Lake. The former is a former water supply reservoir, while the latter is used for flood control and recreation. The creek's upper reaches are mainly undisturbed, while the lower reaches are impacted by past mining operations and urban development. The significant majority of the watershed is forested. Pennsylvania State Game Lands are in the watershed's upper reaches and a tract of land maintained by the Lackawanna Valley Conservancy is at its mouth. Aylesworth Creek is designated as a Coldwater Fishery and a Migratory Fishery.

== Course ==
Aylesworth Creek begins in a small lake in a valley in Carbondale Township. It flows south-southwest for several tenths of a mile before passing through a lake. At the southern end of the lake, the creek turns southwest for more than a mile, briefly passing through Mayfield and entering Archbald. In Archbald, it passes through the Edgerton Reservoir and turns west-southwest for approximately a mile. The creek then turns south for a few tenths of a mile before turning southwest and then west-northwest. A few tenths of a mile further downstream, it passes through Aylesworth Creek Lake and continues flowing west-northwest before crossing US Route 6 and turning southwest. After a short distance, it turns west for several tenths of a mile and then turns south. A short distance further downstream, the creek reaches its confluence with the Lackawanna River.

Aylesworth Creek joins the Lackawanna River 24.30 miles (39.11 km) upriver of its mouth.

=== Tributaries ===
Aylesworth Creek has no named tributaries. However, it does have three unnamed tributaries of lengths 0.7 miles (1.1 km), 1.5 miles (2.4 km), and 2.0 miles (3.2 km). All three tributaries enter Aylesworth Creek from the left.

== Hydrology ==
Aylesworth Creek is designated by the Pennsylvania Department of Environmental Protection as an impaired stream from a point upstream of the Edgerton Reservoir downstream to its mouth. The causes of the impairment have at various times included pH, metals, and flow alterations and the sources of the impairment have included abandoned mine drainage and resource extraction. A total of 0.6 miles (0.97 km) of one of the unnamed tributaries is impaired, with the cause being flow alterations and the source being abandoned mine drainage.

Abandoned mine drainage pollution has caused Aylesworth Creek to have high concentrations of metals and a low pH on the main stem downstream of the Aylesworth Reservoir. Mine drainage in the watershed comes from seeps.

The concentration of iron in Aylesworth Creek between the Aylesworth Reservoir and UNT 28567 is 0.07 milligrams per liter and the daily load is 5.3 pounds (2.4 kg). The concentration of manganese in the creek at this site is 0.15 milligrams per liter and the load is 11.4 pounds (5.2 kg). The aluminum concentration is 0.26 milligrams per liter and the daily load is 19.8 pounds (9.0 kg) per day. None of these need reduction to meet the total maximum daily load. However, a 92 percent reduction in acidity is needed to meet the total maximum daily load requirements. The acidity concentration is 16.98 milligrams per liter and the load is 1,283.3 pounds (582.1 kg). The alkalinity concentration is 3.89 milligrams per liter and the daily load of alkalinity is 295.6 pounds (134.1 kg).

Near its mouth, iron and aluminum in Aylesworth Creek were not detected in the total maximum daily load study. The concentration of manganese is 0.11 milligrams per liter and the daily load is 11.6 pounds (5.3 kg). The acidity concentration is 12.60 milligrams per liter and the load of acidity is 1,325.1 pounds (601.1 kg). The alkalinity concentration is 9.23 milligrams per liter and the load of acidity is 970.7 pounds (440.3 kg).

The average discharge of Aylesworth Creek at site AC2 is 6318.72 gallons per minute. Measurements by the Susquehanna River Basin Commission have ranged from 605.25 to 10,799.15 gallons per minute. The pH of the creek at this site ranges from 4.4 to 5.6, with an average of 5.1. The concentration of sulfate averages 20.17 milligrams per liter and ranges from 20 to 54 milligrams per liter. At the site AC1, the discharge ranges from 382.23 to 15,402.36 gallons per minute, with an average of 8747.82 gallons per minute. The pH ranges from 5.3 to 6.5 and averages 5.72. The sulfate concentration ranges from less than 20 to 36.6 milligrams per liter, with an average of 29.05 milligrams per liter.

== Geography and geology ==
The elevation near the mouth of Aylesworth Creek is 925 feet (282 m) above sea level. The elevation of the creek's source is between 1,560 and 1,580 feet (480 and 480 m) above sea level.

The watershed of Aylesworth Creek is in the Appalachian Mountain section of the ridge and valley physiographic province. The topography of the creek's watershed is similar to that of the Lackawanna River watershed in general, with long, steep ridges separated by valleys.

The headwaters of Aylesworth Creek are in a small wetland pond in the Moosic Mountains. The upper reaches of the creek are pristine and undisturbed. However, the lower reaches of the creek have been impacted by past mining operations and urban development.

A morphological feature known as the Edgerton Slides is in the watershed of Aylesworth Creek. Dams such as the Aylesworth Dam and the Edgerton Dam are also in the watershed of the creek in Archbald. In its upper reaches, the creek's watershed contains wetlands and ravines. The creek flows over coal measures and sees its first mining impacts between the Edgerton Reservoir and the Aylesworth Reservoir. In the lower reaches of the creek, its bank is encroached by overburden and culm. Even in this reach, however, the channel is still relatively stable.

A total of 90 percent of the watershed of Aylesworth Creek is on interbedded sedimentary rock. The remaining 10 percent is on sandstone. The upper reaches of the watershed are on poorly drained, rocky soil. However, the lower reaches are either on impervious land or mining lands with quick permeability.

== Watershed ==
The watershed of Aylesworth Creek has an area of 6.73 square miles (17.4 km^{2}). The mouth of the stream is in the United States Geological Survey quadrangle of Carbondale. However, its source is in the quadrangle of Waymart.

Most of the watershed of Aylesworth Creek (a total of 89 percent) is on forested land. The remaining 11 percent includes abandoned mine lands, residential development, and recreational development. The watershed is considerably narrower in its lower reaches than in its upper reaches. Most of it is in Archbald, Carbondale Township, and Jefferson Township. A smaller part of the watershed is in Mayfield. However, the easternmost corner is in Wayne County.

The Edgerton Reservoir, a former water supply reservoir, is on Aylesworth Creek. The Aylesworth Reservoir is also on the creek, approximately 1.5 miles (2.4 km) downstream of the Edgerton Reservoir.

Aylesworth Creek is a second-order stream. Most of the upper reaches of the watershed are on Pennsylvania State Game Lands or private property. This helps conserve the undisturbed nature of this part of the watershed. The creek also crosses the Robery Casey Highway. It can be accessed via US Route 6.

== History and recreation ==
Aylesworth Creek was entered into the Geographic Names Information System on August 2, 1979. Its identifier in the Geographic Names Information System is 1168539.

The remains of a gravity railroad owned by the Delaware and Hudson Railway can be seen along the lower reaches of Aylesworth Creek, as can the remains of some old mills. The United States Army Corps of Engineers constructed a flood protection project on Aylesworth Creek in the 1970s. In 2000, a stream stabilization project was carried out in the creek's lower reaches to reduce bank erosion. An abandoned mine drainage mitigation project is located in the watershed of Aylesworth Creek. It consists of two limestone water wheels the revolve in two concrete basins and neutralize the flow of acid mine drainage into Aylesworth Creek Lake. The project became operational in March 1983 and its construction cost was $344,519.10. However, the system eventually entered a state of disrepair and in 2006 it was replaced by an anoxic limestone drain for $191,000.

As of the early 2000s, a restoration project known as the Aylesworth Creek Restoration has been planned for Aylesworth Creek. This project will regrade culm and mine waste, reduce erosion, and increase alkalinity. The Lackawanna Valley Conservancy maintains an area of 12 acres (4.9 ha) at the creek's confluence with the Lackawanna River. This area is known as the Powder Mill Dam River Corridor Preserve and the creek spends its last 0.2 miles (0.32 km) within it. A walking trail and access to the Lackawanna River are offered at this site. Additionally, a hunting club uses some land in the watershed's upper reaches.

A spring trout-stocking event occurs at the Aylesworth Reservoir on Aylesworth Creek. The reservoir and the surrounding land is also used for swimming and hiking.

Silverbrook Anthracite Inc. #35910102 is the only active surface mining permit in the Aylesworth Creek Watershed. Since the operation does not involve water, a treatment system, an NPDES permit, and a Waste Load Allocation are not necessary.

== Biology ==
The drainage basin of Aylesworth Creek is designated as a Coldwater Fishery and a Migratory Fishery. Aylesworth Creek Lake is stocked with brook trout. The creek is designated as Approved Trout Waters.

In the upper reaches of Aylesworth Creek, as far as the Edgerton Reservoir (2 miles (3.2 km) downstream of its source), the creek has a riparian buffer consisting of native vegetation. A stable forest cover surrounds the area. Hemlock trees occur in this reach. In the creek's lower reaches, there is still a stable riparian buffer consisting of successional vegetation and the remains of native vegetation.

== See also ==
- White Oak Run (Lackawanna River), next tributary of the Lackawanna River going downriver
- Callender Gap Creek, next tributary of the Lackawanna River going upriver
- List of rivers of Pennsylvania
- List of tributaries of the Lackawanna River
