= Sterry Creek =

Sterry Creek Storrs Creek

Physical characteristics
- Source
  - location: mountain in Jessup, Lackawanna County, Pennsylvania
  - elevation: between 1,820 and 1,840 feet (550 and 560 m)
- Mouth
  - location: Lackawanna River in Jessup, Lackawanna County, Pennsylvania
  - coordinates: 41°28′34″N 75°34′56″W
  - elevation: 784 ft (239 m)
- Length: 4.7 mi (7.6 km)
- Basin size: 4.92 mi^{2} (12.7 km^{2})

Basin features
- Progression: Lackawanna River → Susquehanna River → Chesapeake Bay
- Tributaries
  - left: one unnamed tributary

Sterry Creek (also known as Storrs Creek) is a tributary of the Lackawanna River in Lackawanna County, Pennsylvania, in the United States. It is approximately 4.7 miles (7.6 km) long and flows through Jessup and Olyphant. The watershed of the creek has an area of 4.92 square miles (12.7 km^{2}). The creek is impaired by flow and habitat alterations along with flow loss. The O'Conner Dam is on Sterry Creek and impounds a six-acre reservoir. The creek is a major source of flooding in the borough of Jessup. It is designated as a Coldwater Fishery and a Migratory Fishery.

== Course ==
Sterry Creek begins on a mountain in Jessup. It flows west for a short distance before turning northwest for a few tenths of a mile. The creek then turns southwest and enters the O'Conner Reservoir. From the northwestern corner of the reservoir, it turns west-northwest for a few tenths of a mile. The creek then turns west-southwest for several tenths of a mile, crossing Pennsylvania Route 247, receiving an unnamed tributary from the left, and entering Olyphant. In Olyphant, it turns north-northwest for several tenths of a mile and crosses US Route 6 before turning northeast and reentering Jessup. The creek then turns north-northwest again and reenters Olyphant, where it turns north-northwest again for several tenths of a mile and reenters Jessup. In Jessup, it turns due west for a few tenths of a mile before turning north-northwest for a few hundred feet and reaching its confluence with the Lackawanna River.

Sterry Creek joins the Lackawanna River 18.98 miles (30.55 km) upriver of its mouth.

== Hydrology ==
Sterry Creek experiences total flow loss. It begins to lose flow by the time it reaches the Mid Valley Industrial Park. There are also deposits of culm and silt from mining operations along the creek's banks and floodplain.

Sterry Creek is considered to be an impaired stream. The cause of the impairment is flow alterations and habitat alterations. The likely source of the impairment is abandoned mine drainage.

The peak annual discharge of Sterry Creek at its mouth has a 10 percent chance of reaching 320 cubic feet per second. It has a 2 percent chance of reaching 380 cubic feet per second and a 1 percent chance of reaching 410 cubic feet per second. The peak annual discharge has a 0.2 percent chance of reaching 460 cubic feet per second.

The peak annual discharge of Sterry Creek at a ponding area upstream of the Delaware and Hudson Railroad crossing has a 10 percent chance of reaching 560 cubic feet per second and a 2 percent chance of reaching 560 cubic feet per second. It has a 1 percent chance of reaching 1490 cubic feet per second and a 0.2 percent chance of reaching 2640 cubic feet per second.

Approximately 700 feet (210 m) upstream of Lane Street, the peak annual discharge has a 10 percent chance of reaching 410 cubic feet per second. It has a 2 percent chance of reaching 890 cubic feet per second and a 1 percent chance of reaching 1220 cubic feet per second. The peak annual discharge has a 0.2 percent chance of reaching 2480 cubic feet per second.

== Geography and geology ==
The elevation near the mouth of Sterry Creek is 784 feet (239 m) above sea level. The elevation of the creek's source is between 1,820 and 1,840 feet (550 and 560 m) above sea level.

The headwaters of Sterry Creek are in the vicinity of the Valley View Business Park and the Moosic Mountain ridgetop barrens. It is impacted by abandoned mines by the time it reaches the culvert under Pennsylvania Route 247. From river mile 3.5 downstream to its mouth, most of its length is impacted by abandoned mines. One reach of the creek is in a concrete U-channel. The creek lacks any riffle/pool systems and is highly disturbed by coal fines and silt.

Sterry Creek receives runoff from hills to its east. Water from culm banks also drains into the creek, carrying sediment with it. Part of the Moosic Mountains are in the eastern part of the creek's watershed.

The O'Conner Dam is in the watershed of Sterry Creek in Jessup. This dam is in the creek's upper reaches and impounds a water supply reservoir with an area of 6 acres (2.4 ha). In the early 1900s, several coal mines were in the watershed.

== Watershed ==
The watershed of Sterry Creek has an area of 4.92 square miles (12.7 km^{2}). The creek is entirely within the United States Geological Survey quadrangle of Olyphant. The watershed is in the eastern part of the Lackawanna River watershed. It occupies parts of three municipalities: the boroughs of Jessup and Olyphant and Jefferson Township.

Sterry Creek is a large first-order stream. The creek is one major source of flooding in the borough of Jessup. Debris gathering at culverts on the creek causes it to back of and flood nearby properties and basements. The creek is a "mostly quiet stream" that is usually "little more than a trickle". However, once every ten years, it overflows its banks and damages nearby properties. Development in the watershed's upper reaches may impact the creek.

As of the late 20th century, approximately 10 percent of the watershed of Sterry Creek consists of residential development. Much of this was near the Lackawanna River. More than half of the watershed contained forested land.

== History and recreation ==
Sterry Creek was entered into the Geographic Names Information System on August 2, 1979. Its identifier in the Geographic Names Information System is 1199619. The creek is also known as Storrs Creek. This name appears in Patton's Philadelphia and Suburbs Street and Road Map, which was published in 1984.

A channelization project was carried out on 1 mile (1.6 km) of Sterry Creek by the Pennsylvania Department of Environmental Resources in 1990 in Jessup.

Sterry Creek was given a stream ranking of "Low" in the Lackawanna Valley Industrial Highway Project's Environmental Impact Statement in 1992.

In the early 2000s, a greenway conservation and recreation area along Sterry Creek was proposed in the Lackawanna River Watershed Conservation Plan. The conservation plan also recommended that the boroughs of Olyphant and Jessup include protection of the creek in their zoning plans. Additionally, the creek was on the Watershed Restoration Priority List of the Lackawanna River Watershed Conservation Plan. The Pennsylvania Department of Transportation is studying the creek to investigate flooding problems. The study is slated to be complete in June 2015.

== Biology ==
The drainage basin of Sterry Creek is designated as a Coldwater Fishery and a Migratory Fishery. As of the early 1990s, it contains no macroinvertebrates or fish.

Sterry Creek was described as a "low-quality" aquatic resource in a 1992 Environmental Impact Statement.

== See also ==
- Wildcat Creek (Lackawanna River), next tributary of the Lackawanna River going downriver
- Grassy Island Creek, next tributary of the Lackawanna River going upriver
- List of rivers of Pennsylvania
- List of tributaries of the Lackawanna River
