= Rogers Brook =

Rogers Brook Roger's Creek

Physical characteristics
- Source
  - location: low hill in Clinton Township, Wayne County, Pennsylvania
  - elevation: between 2,020 and 2,040 feet (620 and 620 m)
- Mouth
  - location: Lackawanna River in Clinton Township, Wayne County, Pennsylvania
  - coordinates: 41°38′18″N 75°27′29″W
  - elevation: 1,404 ft (428 m)
- Length: 1.8 mi (2.9 km)

Basin features
- Progression: Lackawanna River → Susquehanna River → Chesapeake Bay
- Tributaries
  - right: one unnamed tributary

Rogers Brook (also known as Roger's Creek) is a tributary of the Lackawanna River in Wayne County, Pennsylvania, in the United States. It is approximately 1.8 miles (2.9 km) long and flows through Clinton Township. The stream has one unnamed tributary. The watershed of Rogers Brook drains part of the Moosic Mountains Ridge. The surficial geology in the stream's vicinity mainly consists of Wisconsinan Till, surface mining land, and bedrock containing sandstone and shale.

== Course ==
Rogers Brook begins on a low hill in Clinton Township. It flows west for several hundred feet before turning west-northwest. After a few tenths of a mile, the stream turns north-northwest for a short distance. It then turns northwest for several tenths of a mile, receiving an unnamed tributary from the right before turning west-southwest for several tenths of a mile and flowing through a small valley to its confluence with the Lackawanna River, not far from the border between Wayne County and Lackawanna County.

=== Tributaries ===
Rogers Brook has no named tributaries. However, it does have one unnamed tributary, which is approximately 0.5 miles (0.80 km) long and flows in a generally westerly direction.

== Geography and geology ==
The elevation near the mouth of Rogers Brook is 1,404 feet (428 m) above sea level. The elevation near the source of the stream is between 2,020 and 2,040 feet (620 and 620 m) above sea level.

The surficial geology in the vicinity of Rogers Brook mostly consists of a glacial or resedimented till known as Wisconsinan Till. However, near the stream's mouth, there is a patch of surface mining land, consisting of linear pits and piles of waste rock. The pits are generally several hundred feet long and less than 100 feet (30 m) deep. There is a smaller patch of such land further upstream as well. Additionally, the surficial geology near the stream includes some patches of bedrock consisting of sandstone and shale.

The total thickness of surficial deposits in the vicinity of Rogers Brook is more than 30 feet (9.1 m) for most of the stream's length. Near the stream's unnamed tributary, there is an area where the surficial deposits measure more than 100 feet (30 m) thick. Rogers Brook drains a portion of the western side of the Moosic Mountain Ridge.

== Watershed ==
Rogers Brook is entirely within the United States Geological Survey quadrangle of Forest City. The confluence of Rogers Brook with the Lackawanna River is located to the south of Browndale.

Rogers Brook is a second-order stream.

Rogers Brook drains a tract of land in or near the Panther Bluff Preserve and to the north of Salko's tract. The Panther Bluff Preserve is a conserved area of undeveloped land high in the Moosic Mountains.

== History ==
Rogers Brook was entered into the Geographic Names Information System on January 1, 1990. Its identifier in the Geographic Names Information System is 1202343. The stream is also known as Roger's Creek.

== See also ==
- Wilson Creek (Lackawanna River), next tributary of the Lackawanna River going downriver
- Clarks Creek (Lackawanna River), next tributary of the Lackawanna River going upriver
- List of rivers of Pennsylvania
- List of tributaries of the Lackawanna River
