= Elk Mountain Ski Area =

Ski area in Pennsylvania, United States

- Interactive map of Elk Mountain Ski Area
- Location: Herrick Township, Susquehanna County, near Union Dale, Pennsylvania, U.S.
- Nearest city: Scranton, Pennsylvania
- Coordinates: 41.721°N 75.559°W
- Vertical: 925 ft (282 m)
- Top elevation: 2,667 ft (813 m)
- Base elevation: 1,742 ft (531 m)
- Skiable area: 180 acres (0.73 km^{2})
- Trails: 27 : 25%—easy : 30%—difficult : 45%—more difficult : 0%—extreme
- Longest run: 1.75 miles (2.816 km)
- Lift system: 1 rope tow 6 chairlifts
- Lift capacity: 5,400/hr
- Terrain parks: 2
- Snowfall: 60 inches (1.5 m)
- Snowmaking: 100%
- Night skiing: 30%
- Website: www.elkskier.com

Elk Mountain Ski Resort is a ski area in the Endless Mountains on the summit of Elk Hill in Susquehanna County, Pennsylvania. It is located 30 mi (48 km) north of Scranton. The mountain has been given favorable reviews from Ski Magazine, including a listing in "Six Unsung Heroes", a roundup of hidden gems in skiing.

== History ==
Elk Mountain opened in 1959. The ski area provided a small lodge, a 2,200 ft (670 m) T-Bar ski lift, tow rope lifts and a small number of trails. In 1961, a double chair lift was installed, allowing for additional trails. A year later, in 1962, snowmaking was added along with a new A-frame lodge at the base of the mountain. Night skiing came to Elk Mountain in 1966, and trails were expanded further in 1972. Elk Mountain built a 4,000-foot-long (1,200 m) long quad chairlift in 1994.

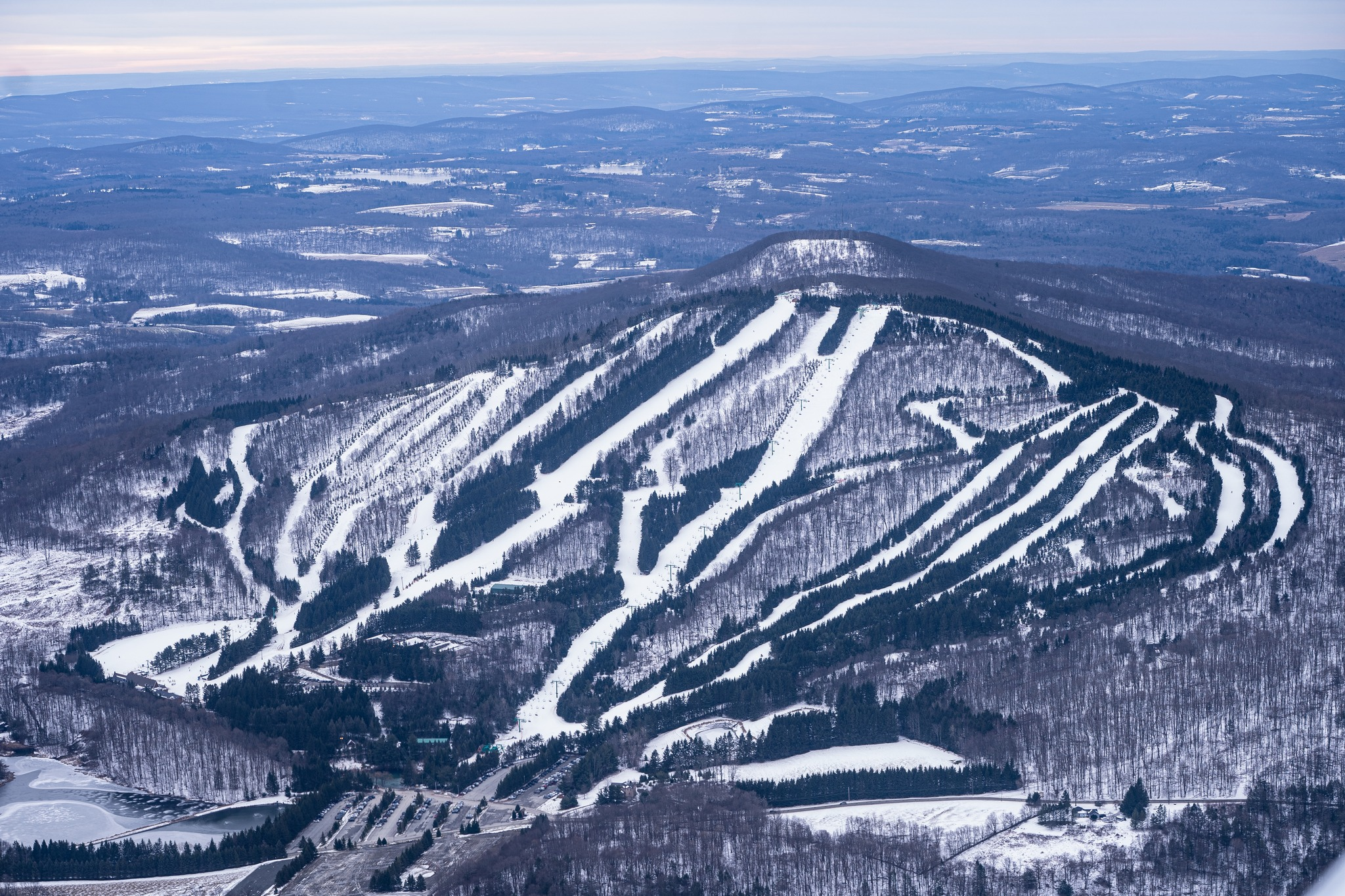
Aerial view of Elk Mountain

== Skiing at Elk Mountain ==
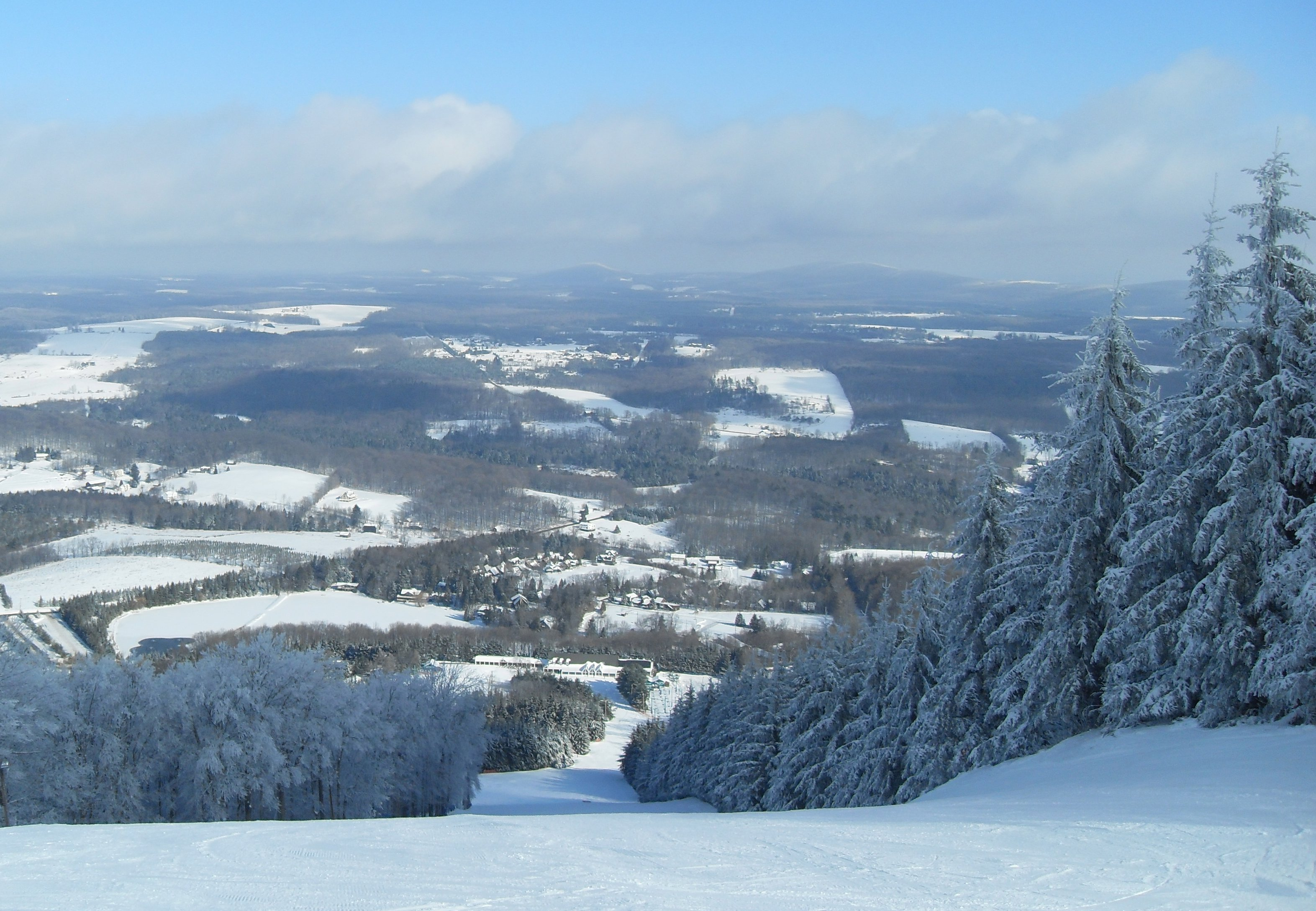
The Endless Mountains, as seen from the top of Elk Mountain

North Chair at Elk Mountain accesses a top elevation of 2,667 ft (813 m)—the highest lift-serviced skiing in eastern Pennsylvania. Elk has a 925 ft (282 m) vertical drop, 27 trails (six greens, 10 blues and 11 diamonds) and two terrain parks. Five double chair lifts and a fixed-grip quad chair lift provide access to the top of the mountain. Four of the lifts, including the quad, run from the base to just below the summit of the mountain. Most ski runs are groomed, but a few are allowed to bump up, or become moguled, to allow for additional challenge. The mountain receives, on average, 5 feet of natural snow per season. Snowmaking covers 100% of the 180 acres (73 ha) of skiable terrain. The base complex features a day lodge, guest services, ski school center, restaurant, rentals, and a ski-and-snowboard shop.

== Climate ==
According to the Trewartha climate classification system, Elk Mountain Ski Area has a Temperate Continental (Dc) Climate with warm summers (b), cold winters (o) and year-around precipitation. Dcbo climates are characterized by at least one month having an average mean temperature ≤ 32.0 °F (0 °C), four to seven months with an average mean temperature ≥ 50.0 °F (10 °C), all months with an average mean temperature < 72.0 °F (22 °C) and no significant precipitation difference between seasons. During the summer months at Elk Mountain Ski Area, episodes of high heat and humidity can occur with heat index values ≥ 88 °F (31 °C) at the summit and ≥ 90 °F (32 °C) at the base. The annual peak in thunderstorm activity is July. During the winter months, episodes of extreme cold and wind can occur with wind chill values < −26 °F (−32 °C) at the summit and < −24 °F (−31 °C) at the base. The plant hardiness zone is 5b with an average annual extreme minimum air temperature of −13.5 °F (−25 °C) at the summit and −11.7 °F (−24 °C) at the base. The average seasonal (Oct-Apr) snowfall total is 83.3 inches (212 cm) at the summit and 64.8 inches (165 cm) at the base. Ice storms and large snowstorms depositing ≥ 12 inches (30 cm) of snow are somewhat frequent, particularly during nor’easters from December through March.

Climate data for Elk Mountain Summit (Elevation: 2,667 ft (813 m))
Month	Jan	Feb	Mar	Apr	May	Jun	Jul	Aug	Sep	Oct	Nov	Dec	Year
Mean daily maximum °F (°C)	27.9 (−2.3)	31.0 (−0.6)	39.1 (3.9)	51.7 (10.9)	62.7 (17.1)	71.0 (21.7)	75.3 (24.1)	74.0 (23.3)	66.8 (19.3)	55.8 (13.2)	43.8 (6.6)	32.1 (0.1)	52.7 (11.5)
Daily mean °F (°C)	19.2 (−7.1)	21.6 (−5.8)	29.2 (−1.6)	41.0 (5.0)	51.7 (10.9)	60.6 (15.9)	64.7 (18.2)	63.5 (17.5)	56.1 (13.4)	45.1 (7.3)	35.3 (1.8)	24.5 (−4.2)	42.8 (6.0)
Mean daily minimum °F (°C)	10.5 (−11.9)	12.1 (−11.1)	19.2 (−7.1)	30.3 (−0.9)	40.7 (4.8)	50.2 (10.1)	54.2 (12.3)	53.0 (11.7)	45.3 (7.4)	34.5 (1.4)	26.8 (−2.9)	16.8 (−8.4)	32.9 (0.5)
Average precipitation inches (mm)	3.38 (86)	2.69 (68)	3.34 (85)	3.88 (99)	4.67 (119)	4.98 (126)	4.64 (118)	4.00 (102)	4.70 (119)	4.69 (119)	4.05 (103)	3.65 (93)	48.67 (1,236)
Average relative humidity (%)	76.1	71.2	67.3	62.3	66.5	74.6	74.2	77.1	77.9	74.9	74.8	77.9	72.9
Average dew point °F (°C)	12.9 (−10.6)	13.7 (−10.2)	19.7 (−6.8)	29.1 (−1.6)	40.9 (4.9)	52.5 (11.4)	56.3 (13.5)	56.2 (13.4)	49.3 (9.6)	37.6 (3.1)	28.1 (−2.2)	18.6 (−7.4)	37.6 (3.1)
Source: PRISM

Climate data for Elk Mountain Base (Elevation: 1,742 ft (531 m))
Month	Jan	Feb	Mar	Apr	May	Jun	Jul	Aug	Sep	Oct	Nov	Dec	Year
Mean daily maximum °F (°C)	28.8 (−1.8)	32.1 (0.1)	40.3 (4.6)	53.3 (11.8)	64.5 (18.1)	72.8 (22.7)	77.0 (25.0)	75.7 (24.3)	68.3 (20.2)	57.1 (13.9)	44.9 (7.2)	33.2 (0.7)	54.1 (12.3)
Daily mean °F (°C)	20.2 (−6.6)	22.7 (−5.2)	30.4 (−0.9)	42.6 (5.9)	53.3 (11.8)	62.3 (16.8)	66.4 (19.1)	65.1 (18.4)	57.5 (14.2)	46.4 (8.0)	36.4 (2.4)	25.5 (−3.6)	44.2 (6.8)
Mean daily minimum °F (°C)	11.6 (−11.3)	13.3 (−10.4)	20.5 (−6.4)	31.8 (−0.1)	42.2 (5.7)	51.8 (11.0)	55.7 (13.2)	54.5 (12.5)	46.6 (8.1)	35.7 (2.1)	27.9 (−2.3)	17.9 (−7.8)	34.2 (1.2)
Average precipitation inches (mm)	3.30 (84)	2.66 (68)	3.32 (84)	3.87 (98)	4.61 (117)	4.97 (126)	4.65 (118)	3.96 (101)	4.63 (118)	4.59 (117)	3.99 (101)	3.57 (91)	48.12 (1,222)
Average relative humidity (%)	76.2	71.6	67.7	62.5	66.2	74.0	73.8	77.0	78.0	74.7	74.9	78.3	72.9
Average dew point °F (°C)	13.9 (−10.1)	14.9 (−9.5)	21.0 (−6.1)	30.7 (−0.7)	42.3 (5.7)	53.9 (12.2)	57.8 (14.3)	57.7 (14.3)	50.7 (10.4)	38.8 (3.8)	29.2 (−1.6)	19.7 (−6.8)	37.6 (3.1)
Source: PRISM
