= Indian Cave Creek =

Physical characteristics
- Source
  - location: mountain in Jefferson Township, Lackawanna County, Pennsylvania
  - elevation: between 1,960 and 1,980 feet (600 and 600 m)
- Mouth
  - location: White Oak Run in Archbald, Lackawanna County, Pennsylvania
  - coordinates: 41°29′51″N 75°31′00″W
  - elevation: 1,319 ft (402 m)
- Length: 1.9 mi (3.1 km)
- Basin size: 1.59 mi^{2} (4.1 km^{2})

Basin features
- Progression: White Oak Run → Lackawanna River → Susquehanna River → Chesapeake Bay

Indian Cave Creek is a tributary of White Oak Run in Lackawanna County, Pennsylvania, in the United States. It is approximately 1.9 miles (3.1 km) long and flows through Jefferson Township and Archbald. The watershed of the creek has an area of 1.59 square miles (4.1 km^{2}). The creek is not considered to be impaired and it has considerable canopy coverage. A waterfall known as the Forty Foot Falls is located at its mouth.

== Course ==
Indian Cave Creek begins on a mountain in Jefferson Township. It flows northwest for several tenths of a mile and enters Archbald. It then turns south-southwest for a few tenths of a mile, flowing near the border between Archbald and Jefferson Township. The creek then turns west-northwest for a short distance before turning southwest. Several tenths of a mile further downstream, it reaches its confluence with White Oak Run.

Indian Cave Creek joins White Oak Run 1.27 miles (2.04 km) upstream of its mouth.

== Hydrology ==
Indian Cave Creek is not designated as an impaired waterbody.

== Geography and geology ==
The elevation near the mouth of Indian Cave Creek is 1,319 feet (402 m) above sea level. The elevation of the creek's source is between 1,960 and 1,980 feet (600 and 600 m).

A waterfall known as the Forty Foot Falls is on Indian Cave Creek in Archbald. The waterfall is located at the creek's mouth and is so-named because it is 40 feet (12 m) high.

== Watershed and biology ==
The watershed of Indian Cave Creek has an area of 1.59 square miles (4.1 km^{2}). The mouth of the creek is in the United States Geological Survey quadrangle of Olyphant. However, its source is in the quadrangle of Waymart. The creek also passes through the quadrangle of Carbondale.

Part of or all of the watershed of Indian Cave Creek has a tree canopy coverage of 94 percent. This is one of the highest values for small watersheds in the Scranton Metro Area.

== History ==
Indian Cave Creek was entered into the Geographic Names Information System on August 2, 1979. Its identifier in the Geographic Names Information System is 1199884.

In the early 2000s, the Lackawanna River Watershed Conservation Plan recommended that Jefferson Township include protection of Indian Cave Creek in its zoning plans, comprehensive plans, and other plans. On July 18, 2011, White Stone Quarry, LLC received a permit to discharge stormwater into Indian Cave Creek.

== See also ==
- List of rivers of Pennsylvania
- List of tributaries of the Lackawanna River
