= Meredith Brook =

Tributary of the Lackawanna River in Pennsylvania, United States

Physical characteristics
- Source
  - location: lake in Forest City, Susquehanna County, Pennsylvania
  - elevation: between 1,700 and 1,720 feet (518 and 524 m)
- Mouth
  - location: Lackawanna River in Clinton Township, Wayne County, Pennsylvania
  - coordinates: 41°38′43″N 75°27′41″W
  - elevation: 1,414 ft (431 m)
- Length: 2.1 mi (3.4 km)

Basin features
- Progression: Lackawanna River → Susquehanna River → Chesapeake Bay

Meredith Brook is a tributary of the Lackawanna River in Susquehanna County, Lackawanna County, and Wayne County, in Pennsylvania, in the United States. It is approximately 2.1 miles (3.4 km) long and flows through Forest City and Clifford Township in Susquehanna County, Vandling in Lackawanna County, and Clinton Township in Wayne County. In the early 1900s, the stream was clear in its lower reaches despite receiving water from a borehole and culm banks. There are two shallow lakes in the watershed: Lake Erie and Kennedy Pond. Various fish inhabit the lakes.

== Course ==
Meredith Brook begins in a lake in Forest City. It flows southwest for several hundred feet, almost immediately entering Clifford Township. The stream then turns south for a short distance, crossing Pennsylvania Route 247 before turning east and reentering Forest City. In Forest City, it passes through another lake and reenters Clifford Township. From the southwestern end of the lake, the stream flows southwest for a few hundred feet before turning south-southeast for a short distance, exiting Susquehanna County and entering Vandling, in Lackawanna County. Upon entering Vandling, it turns east and then northeast, reentering Forest City and Susquehanna County after a few tenths of a mile. Once in Forest City, it turns east for a short distance before turning north-northeast. After a short distance, the stream crosses Pennsylvania Route 171 and turns east-northeast. A short distance further downstream, it reaches its confluence with the Lackawanna River.

Meredith Brook joins the Lackawanna River 35.1 miles (56.5 km) upriver of its mouth.

== Hydrology ==
In the early 1900s, Meredith Brook was clear in its lower reaches. However, water from some culm banks at the Forest City Colliery drained into the stream. Mine water from a borehole was also pumped directly into the stream. However, the stream was free of pollution of any variety upstream of the No. 2 Shaft.

== Geography and geology ==
The elevation near the mouth of Meredith Brook is 1,414 feet (431 m) above sea level. The elevation of the stream's source is between 1,700 and 1,720 feet (518 and 524 m) above sea level.

In the early 1900s, Meredith Brook was troughed under mining railroad tracks or rock and culm banks in some reaches. However, its streambed was in good condition and free of debris. The steam's streambanks were "well-formed", preventing wash. It is a small tributary stream.

== Watershed and biology ==
Meredith Brook is entirely within the United States Geological Survey quadrangle of Forest City. The stream flows through three counties.

Lakes in the watershed of Meredith Brook include Kennedy Pond and Lake Erie, both of which are in the western part of the borough of Forest City. Both lakes are fairly shallow, with an average depth of around 3 to 4 feet (0.91 to 1.22 m), but Lake Erie is three times larger.

Meredith Brook is a first-order stream. In the early 1900s, a reservoir on the stream was owned by the Pennsylvania Coal Company and used to supply drinking water to collieries.

Panfish occur within Kennedy Pond, in the watershed of Meredith Brook. Such fish also occur in Lake Erie, as do pickerel and bass.

== History ==
Meredith Brook was entered into the Geographic Names Information System on January 1, 1990. Its identifier in the Geographic Names Information System is 1202341.

== See also ==
- Clarks Creek (Lackawanna River), next tributary of the Lackawanna River going upriver
- Brace Brook, next tributary of the Lackawanna River going upriver
- List of rivers of Pennsylvania
- List of tributaries of the Lackawanna River
