= Elk Hill (Pennsylvania) =

Mountain in Pennsylvania, United States

- Elk Mountain
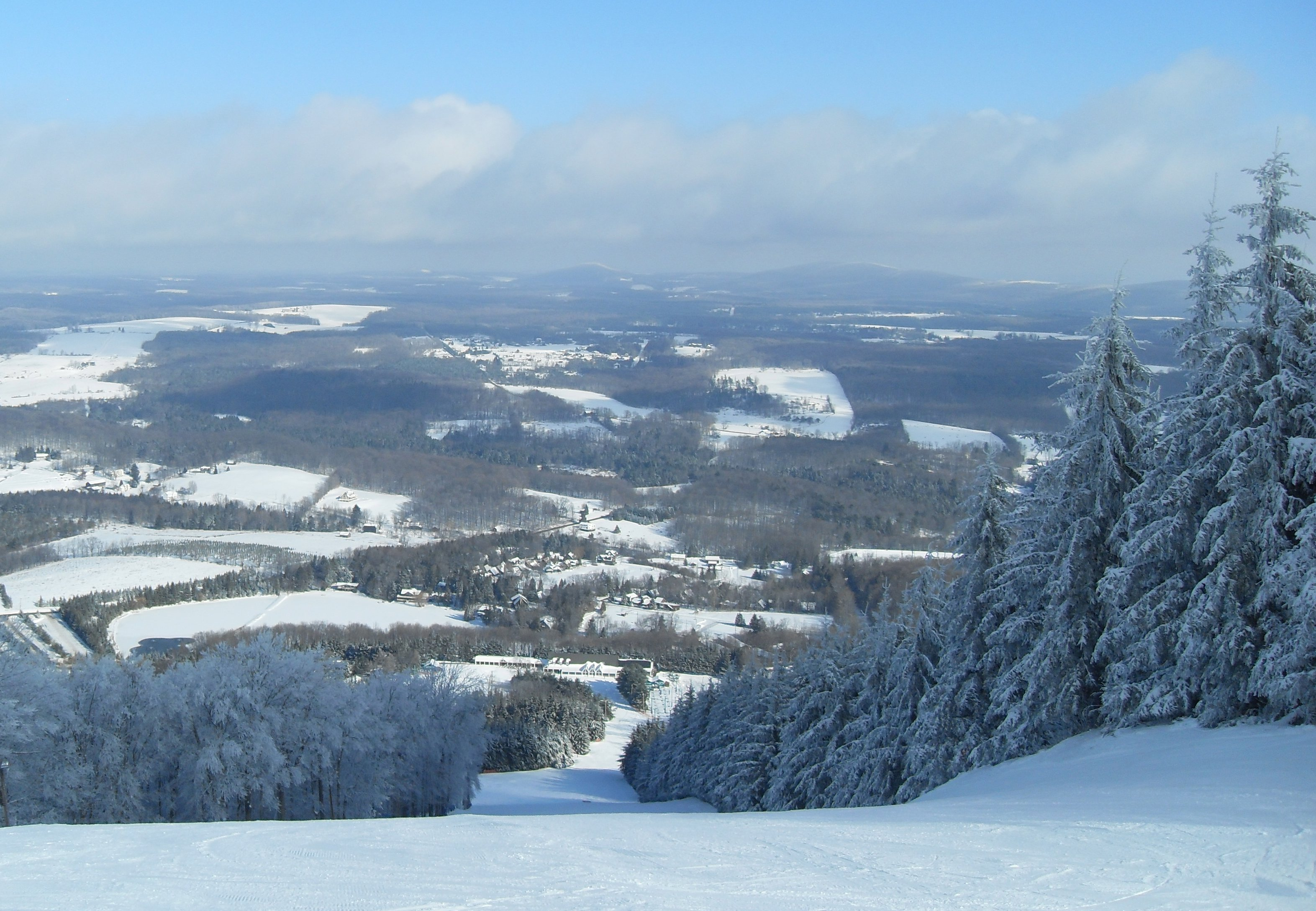
- View from the North Knob of Elk Mountain

Highest point
- Elevation: 2,693 ft (821 m)
- Coordinates: 41°42′53.856″N 75°33′43.020″W

Geography
- Location within Pennsylvania
- Location: Susquehanna County, Pennsylvania, U.S.
- Parent range: Appalachian Mountains
- Topo map: USGS Clifford(PA) Quadrangle

Elk Hill, also known as North Knob or Elk Mountain, is a mountain in Herrick Township, Pennsylvania. It is the highest mountain peak in Pennsylvania east of the Susquehanna River and the highest peak on the Allegheny Plateau.

Elk Hill rises conspicuously above the surrounding landscape. The mountain actually has two peaks. The main summit of North Knob is 2,693 feet (821 m), and the lower summit known as South Knob is 2,602 feet (793 m). It is home to Elk Mountain Ski Area which has a 1,000 feet (305 m) vertical drop and 27 ski trails.
