= Union Dale, Pennsylvania =

Borough in Pennsylvania, US

- Borough
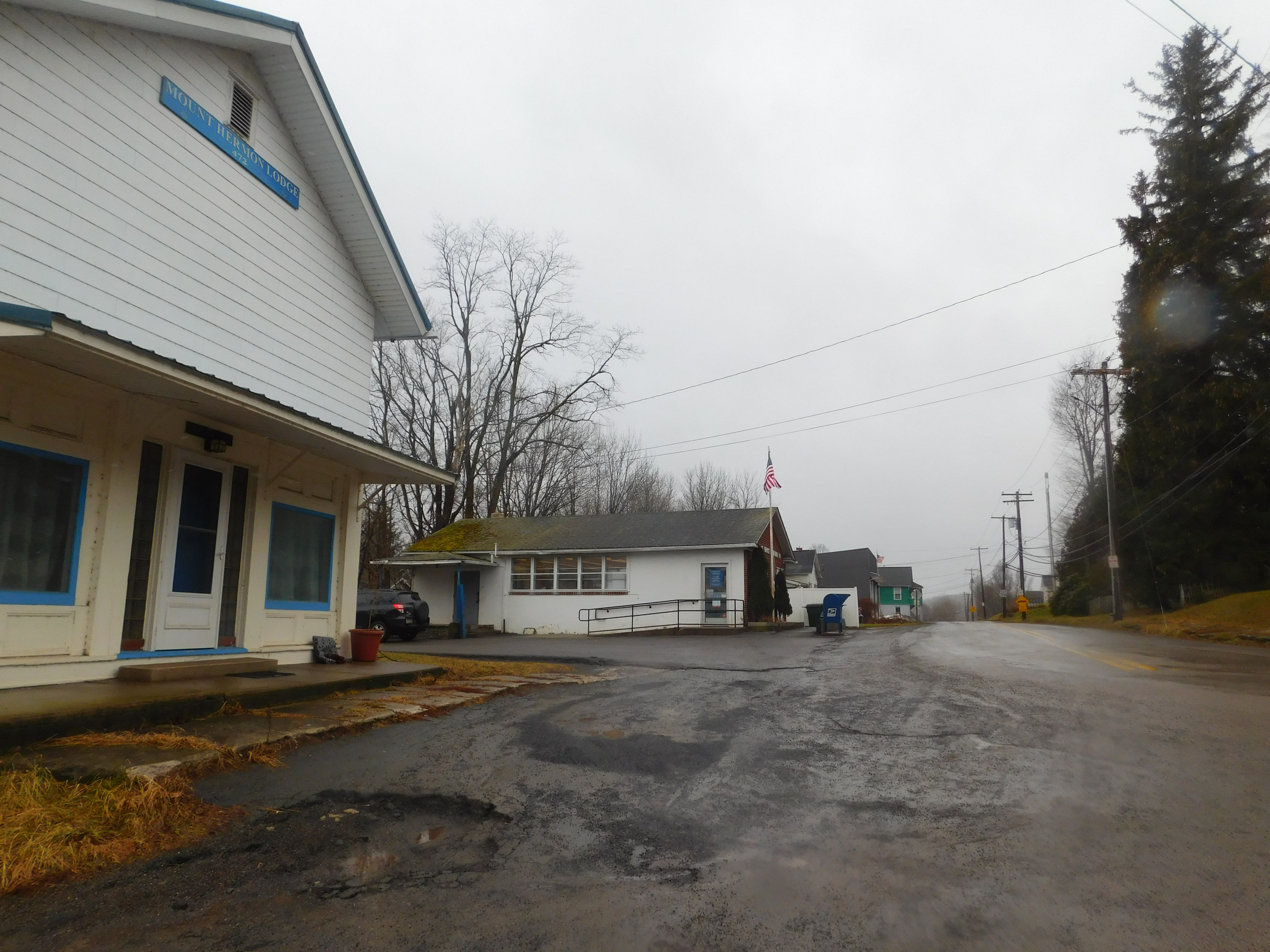
- Looking south along Main Street

- Location of Union Dale in Susquehanna County, Pennsylvania.

- Location within Pennsylvania Location within the United States
- Coordinates: 41°42′58″N 75°29′13″W
- Country: United States
- State: Pennsylvania
- County: Susquehanna
- Incorporated: 1885

Area
  - Total: 2.47 sq mi (6.39 km^{2})
  - Land: 2.41 sq mi (6.23 km^{2})
  - Water: 0.062 sq mi (0.16 km^{2})

Population (2020)
  - Total: 222 ▼
  - Estimate (2021): 223
  - Density: 99.3/sq mi (38.35/km^{2})
- Time zone: UTC-5 (Eastern (EST))
  - Summer (DST): UTC-4 (EDT)
- ZIP code: 18470
- Area code: 570
- FIPS code: 42-78456

Union Dale is a borough in Susquehanna County, Pennsylvania, United States. The borough was incorporated in 1885. As of the 2020 census, Union Dale had a population of 220.

== Geography ==
Union Dale is located at 41°42′58″N 75°29′13″W (41.715974, -75.486995).

According to the United States Census Bureau, the borough has a total area of 2.5 square miles (6.5 km^{2}), of which 2.4 square miles (6.2 km^{2}) is land and 0.1 square miles (0.26 km^{2}) (2.4%) is water.

Just outside Union Dale is the North Knob of Elk Mountain. It is the highest point in Eastern Pennsylvania, as well as in the Allegheny Plateau.

== Demographics ==
Historical population
Census	Pop.	Note	%±
1880	146		—
1890	360		146.6%
1900	351		−2.5%
1910	355		1.1%
1920	370		4.2%
1930	331		−10.5%
1940	348		5.1%
1950	350		0.6%
1960	287		−18.0%
1970	279		−2.8%
1980	321		15.1%
1990	303		−5.6%
2000	368		21.5%
2010	267		−27.4%
2020	220		−17.6%
2021 (est.)	223	▲	1.4%

As of the census of 2010, there were 267 people, 130 households, and 73 families residing in the borough. The population density was 111.2 inhabitants per square mile (42.9/km^{2}). There were 157 housing units at an average density of 65.4 per square mile (25.3/km^{2}). The racial makeup of the borough was 98.5% White, 1.1% African American, and 0.4% from two or more races. Hispanic or Latino of any race were 1.5% of the population.

There were 130 households, out of which 15.4% had children under the age of 18 living with them, 45.4% were married couples living together, 7.7% had a female householder with no husband present, and 43.8% were non-families. 40.8% of all households were made up of individuals, and 15.3% had someone living alone who was 65 years of age or older. The average household size was 2.05 and the average family size was 2.70.

In the borough the population was spread out, with 16.5% under the age of 18, 64% from 18 to 64, and 19.5% who were 65 years of age or older. The median age was 48 years.

The median income for a household in the borough was $39,375, and the median income for a family was $44,375. Males had a median income of $40,556 versus $32,857 for females. The per capita income for the borough was $20,908. About 6.5% of families and 12.5% of the population were below the poverty line, including 28.3% of those under age 18 and 22.9% of those age 65 or over.

== Education ==
Forest City Regional School District is a Preschool-12th grade public school district serving residents of Union Dale.

== See also ==
- Elk Mountain Ski Area
- North Knob
