= Ararat Township, Susquehanna County, Pennsylvania =

Township in Pennsylvania, United States

Ararat
- Township
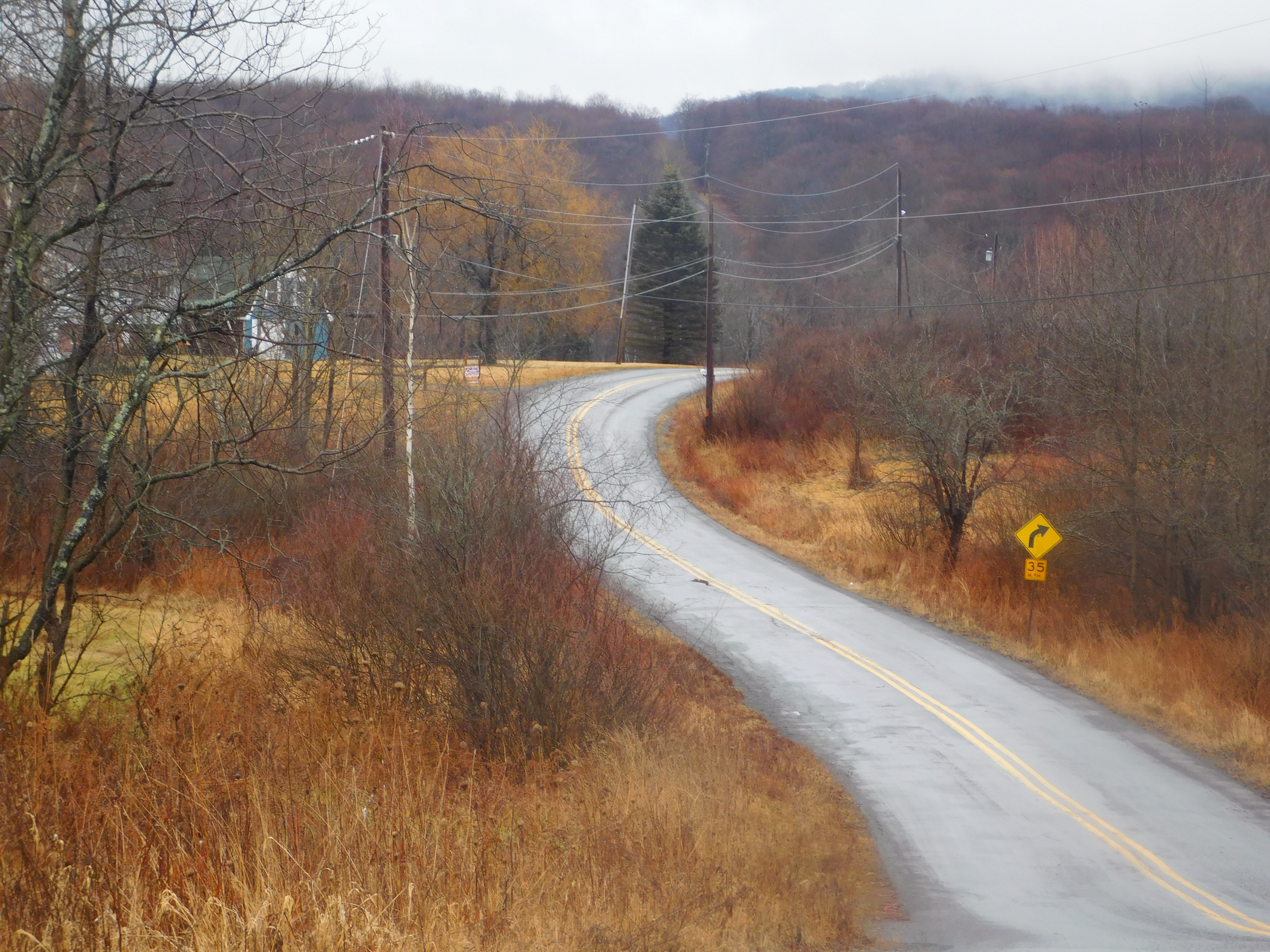
- Near Burnwood

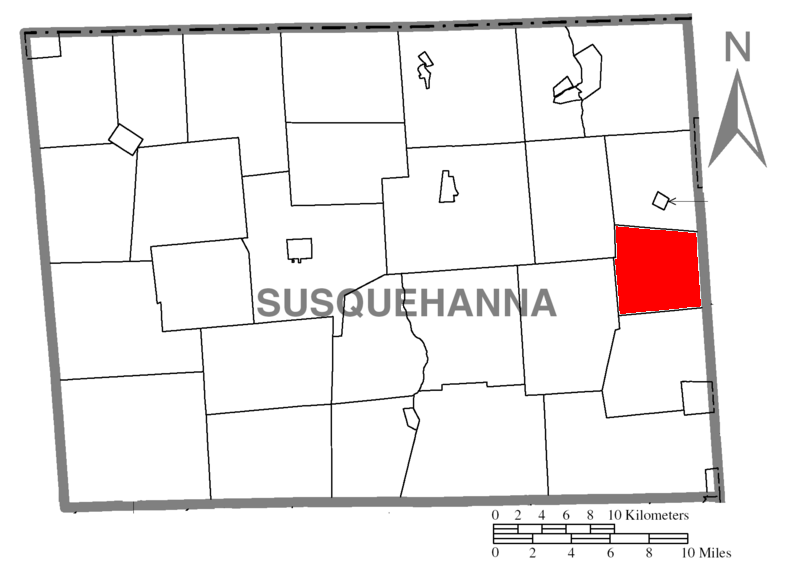
- Location of Ararat Township in Susquehanna County

- Location of Ararat Township in Pennsylvania
- Coordinates: 41°48′27″N 75°30′56″W
- Country: United States
- State: Pennsylvania
- County: Susquehanna
- Settled: 1810
- Incorporated: 1852

Area
  - Total: 19.22 sq mi (49.79 km^{2})
  - Land: 18.58 sq mi (48.12 km^{2})
  - Water: 0.64 sq mi (1.67 km^{2})

Population (2020)
  - Total: 526 ▼
  - Estimate (2021): 524
  - Density: 28.7/sq mi (11.08/km^{2})
- Time zone: UTC-5 (EST)
  - Summer (DST): UTC-4 (EDT)
- Zip Code: 18465
- Area code: 570
- FIPS code: 42-115-02792

Ararat Township is a township in Susquehanna County, Pennsylvania, United States. The population was 526 at the 2020 census.

== History ==
Ararat Township was formed in 1852 from portions of Herrick, Thompson, and Gibson Twps. The Ararat Summit Station was a stop on the Jefferson Branch of the Erie Railroad.

== Geography ==
According to the United States Census Bureau, the township has a total area of 19.25 square miles (49.9 km^{2}), of which 18.6 square miles (48 km^{2}) is land and 0.65 square miles (1.7 km^{2}) (3.38%) is water.

== Communities ==
The following villages are located in Ararat Township:

- Ararat
- Burnwood
- East Ararat

== Demographics ==
Historical population
Census	Pop.	Note	%±
2010	563		—
2020	526		−6.6%
2021 (est.)	524		−0.4%
U.S. Decennial Census

=== 2000 census ===
At the 2000 census there were 531 people, 218 households, and 151 families living in the township. The population density was 28.0 people per square mile (10.8 people/km^{2}). There were 452 housing units at an average density of 23.9 per square mile (9.2/km^{2}). The racial makeup of the township was 98.49% White, 0.19% African American, 0.38% Asian, 0.19% from other races, and 0.75% from two or more races. Hispanic or Latino of any race were 0.38%.

Of the 218 households 27.1% had children under the age of 18 living with them, 61.0% were married couples living together, 3.7% had a female householder with no husband present, and 30.7% were non-families. 25.2% of households were one person and 11.9% were one person aged 65 or older. The average household size was 2.44 and the average family size was 2.91.

The age distribution was 22.4% under the age of 18, 6.8% from 18 to 24, 24.9% from 25 to 44, 29.0% from 45 to 64, and 16.9% 65 or older. The median age was 43 years. For every 100 females there were 110.7 males. For every 100 females age 18 and over, there were 107.0 males.

The median household income was $30,278 and the median family income was $34,063. Males had a median income of $36,429 versus $21,875 for females. The per capita income for the township was $14,793. About 18.6% of families and 22.5% of the population were below the poverty line, including 34.5% of those under age 18 and 13.3% of those age 65 or over.

=== 2010 census ===
As of the census of 2010, there were 563 people, 246 households, and 155 families living in the township. The population density was 30.3 people per square mile (11.7 people/km^{2}). There were 478 housing units at an average density of 25.7 per square mile (9.9/km^{2}). The racial makeup of the township was 98.3% White, 0.4% African American, 0.4% American Indian, 0.2% Asian, 0.5% from other races, and 0.2% from two or more races. Hispanic or Latino of any race were 1.8% of the population.

Of the 246 households 25.2% had children under the age of 18 living with them, 54.1% were married couples living together, 5.7% had a female householder with no husband present, and 37% were non-families. 30.5% of households were one person and 15% were one person aged 65 or older. The average household size was 2.29 and the average family size was 2.85.

The age distribution was 19.9% under the age of 18, 60.9% from 18 to 64, and 19.2% 65 or older. The median age was 46 years.

The median household income was $52,639 and the median family income was $57,857. Males had a median income of $32,500 versus $27,813 for females. The per capita income for the township was $21,389. About 7.8% of families and 15.1% of the population were below the poverty line, including 14.7% of those under age 18 and 12.5% of those age 65 or over.
