= Moosic Mountains =

Pennsylvanian Mountain Range

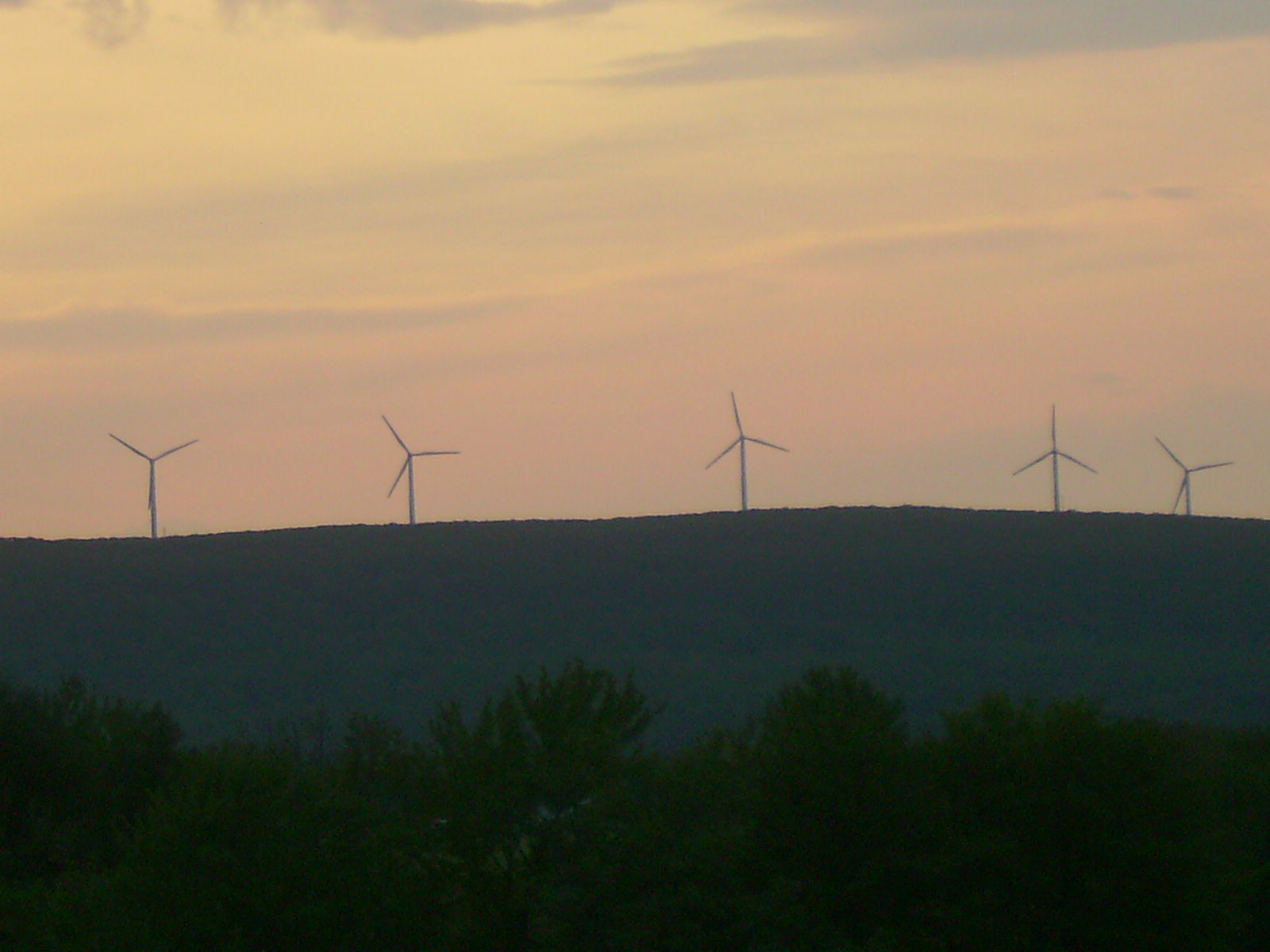
- Wind turbines on High Knob in the Moosic Mountains

Highest point
- Elevation: 2,323 ft (708 m)
- Coordinates: 41°29′42″N 75°28′22.8″W

Geography
- Location within Pennsylvania
- Country: United States
- Region: Pennsylvania

The Moosic Mountains is a mountain range in Northeastern Pennsylvania that stretches from Scranton to Mount Pleasant Township, a distance of roughly 32 miles.

The high point of the range is in Jefferson Township, at an elevation of 2,323 feet (708 meters) above sea level, which is the highest point in the Pocono Mountains and 27th-highest in Pennsylvania.
