= Stafford Meadow Brook =

River in Pennsylvania, US

Stafford Meadow Brook Stafford Meadow Creek
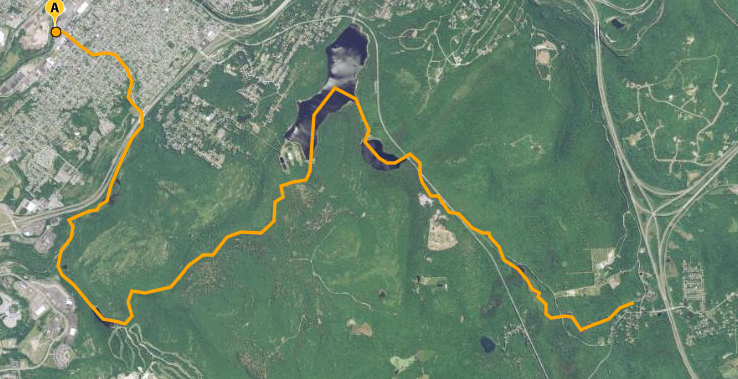
- Satellite map of Stafford Meadow Brook

Physical characteristics
- Source
  - location: near Birchwood Estates in Roaring Brook Township, Lackawanna County, Pennsylvania
  - elevation: between 1,560 and 1,580 feet (480 and 480 m)
- Mouth
  - location: Lackawanna River in Scranton, Lackawanna County, Pennsylvania
  - coordinates: 41°23′47″N 75°40′36″W
  - elevation: 673 ft (205 m)
- Length: 11.2 mi (18.0 km)
- Basin size: 14.1 sq mi (37 km^{2})

Basin features
- Progression: Lackawanna River → Susquehanna River → Chesapeake Bay
- Tributaries
  - right: Mountain Lake Run

Stafford Meadow Brook (also known as Stafford Meadow Creek) is a tributary of the Lackawanna River in Lackawanna County, Pennsylvania, in the United States. It is approximately 11.2 miles (18.0 km) long and flows through Roaring Brook Township, Scranton, and Moosic. The watershed of the stream has an area of 14.1 square miles (37 km^{2}). Part of it is designated as a High-Quality Coldwater Fishery and a Migratory Fishery. The other part is a Warmwater Fishery and a Migratory Fishery. The stream has one named tributary, which is known as Mountain Lake Run. Stafford Meadow Brook has a very high level of water quality for much of its length and part of it meets the criteria for an Exceptional Value designation. The stream begins on the Pocono Plateau and flows through the Moosic Mountains in a mountainous watershed. Its channel has been substantially altered in its lower reaches.

Numerous wetlands and reservoirs are present in the watershed of Stafford Meadow Brook. Reservoirs such as Lake Scranton and the Williams Bridge Reservoir are used as a water supply. Major roads in the watershed include Interstate 81, Interstate 380, Pennsylvania Route 307, and others. In the early 1900s, the main industries in the watershed included coal mining and agriculture. However, iron ore has also been mined in the watershed in the past and a sawmill was once present on the stream. Several railroads historically operated in the watershed and a number of bridges were built over the stream in the 20th century. The Montage Mountain Ski Resort is in the watershed.

== Course ==
Stafford Meadow Brook begins near Birchwood Estates in Roaring Brook Township. It flows west-southwest for several tenths of a mile before turning northwest for a few miles. It flows in a broad valley alongside Pennsylvania Route 307, crossing it three times and receiving five unnamed tributaries: three from the left and two from the right. The stream eventually passes through the Williams Bridge Reservoir as its valley becomes narrower. On the northern side of the reservoir, it flows north-northwest for a few tenths of a mile before entering Lake Scranton and briefly passes through Scranton before reentering Roaring Brook Township. From the southern end of the lake, the stream flows southwest for a few miles, receiving one unnamed tributary from the left and another from the right. It then reenters Scranton and continues flowing southwest, receiving one more unnamed tributary from the left. It then briefly turns south before passing through the District Number Fifty-Nine Reservoir and turning northwest. After several tenths of a mile, it enters Moosic and then turns northeast for more than a mile, reentering Scranton and flowing alongside Interstate 81. The stream eventually receives Mountain Lake Run, its only named tributary, and turns northwest for several tenths of a mile, crossing US Route 11 and reaching its confluence with the Lackawanna River.

Stafford Meadow Brook joins the Lackawanna River 9.06 miles (14.58 km) upriver of its mouth.

=== Tributaries ===
Stafford Meadow Brook has one named tributary, which is known as Mountain Lake Run. It also has numerous unnamed tributaries, which range in length from 0.6 to 1.4 miles (0.97 to 2.25 km).

== Hydrology ==
Stafford Meadow Brook has very high water quality as far downstream as the old Lackawanna and Wyoming Valley Railroad corridor. The stream has received little impact from development above the Williams Bridge Reservoir. However, its banks are affected by urban debris such as yard waste in some parts of its lower reaches. Municipal sewers also sometimes overflow into the stream during rainy conditions. The borough of Moosic has a permit to discharge stormwater into the stream.

At its mouth, the peak annual discharge of Stafford Meadow Brook has a 10 percent chance of reaching 2640 cubic feet per second. It has a 2 percent chance of reaching 4310 cubic feet per second and a 1 percent chance of reaching 5210 cubic feet per second. The peak annual discharge has a 0.2 percent chance of reaching 7110 cubic feet per second.

The peak annual discharge of Stafford Meadow Brook some distance upstream of its mouth (at a point where it drains an area of 13.0 square miles (34 km^{2})) has a 10 percent chance of reaching 2340 cubic feet per second. It has a 2 percent chance of reaching 3730 cubic feet per second and a 1 percent chance of reaching 4480 cubic feet per second. The peak annual discharge has a 0.2 percent chance of reaching 6120 cubic feet per second.

== Geography, geology, and climate ==
The elevation near the mouth of Stafford Meadow Brook is 673 feet (205 m) above sea level. The elevation near the source of the stream is between 1,560 and 1,580 feet (480 and 480 m) above sea level. Its average gradient is approximately 102.5 feet (31.2 m) per mile.

Stafford Meadow Brook is a perennial stream.

Stafford Meadow Brook begins on the Pocono Plateau. It is a mountain stream that flows the Moosic Mountains in Simersons Gap. At points, it also flows through a gorge or through dense brush. Mountains in the watershed include Coon Hill and Scrub Oak Mountain. The topography of the watershed is mountainous, with high steep hills that have been rounded by glaciation. The stream's valley is narrow. It is one of the larger tributaries of the Lackawanna River. It is a second-order stream.

The channel of Stafford Meadow Brook is sinuous. It flows through rock formations consisting of sandstone and shale, with some coal occurring in its lower reaches. The Umbral or Red-shale formation is present in the stream's valley and contains iron ore. The iron ore deposits along the stream are embedded in fireclay and soft clay-shale. Below the ore is a layer of buff and greenish sandy shale. Below this in turn is a compact gray sandstone. A coal outcropping belonging to the Roaring Brook Basin is also in the stream's vicinity.

Between one of Stafford Meadow Brook's reservoirs and southern Scranton, the watershed of the stream is glacially deformed. At a saddle in this reach, the stream was once able to flow through Rocky Glen into Spring Brook during high flow conditions. There is an inner ridge between the gorge of Stafford Meadow Brook and that or Roaring Brook.

Stafford Meadow Brook flows through numerous culverts in southern Scranton. Some stone retaining walls and culverts in this section are more than 100 years old. There are also areas with gabion baskets, wing walls, and concrete bridge piers. Near Elm Street in Scranton, the stream flows through a ravine with a depth of 25 to 30 feet (7.6 to 9.1 m). In this ravine, the stream flows through the remains of an open channel. From Pittston Avenue downstream to its mouth, it flows through an open box culvert built in 1960 for flood control purposes. There is also one pipe with a diameter of 24 inches (61 cm). In Scranton, the stream has an open concrete channel in some places. The channel is 1,350 feet (410 m) long and is part of a flood control project by the Pennsylvania Department of Environmental Protection. Other components of the project include a debris basin and a stilling basin. This project alleviates flooding from near US Route 11 downstream to near South Washington Avenue. In some reaches, the stream is entirely underground. On a reach of the stream in or near Scranton, 90 percent of it is on an impervious surface.

The average annual rate of precipitation in the watershed of Stafford Meadow Brook is between 35 and 40 inches (89 and 102 cm). In July 2013, the temperature near the stream was measured to be 74 °F (23 °C).

== Watershed ==
The watershed of Stafford Meadow Brook has an area of 14.1 square miles (37 km^{2}). The watershed is in the south-central part of the Lackawanna River watershed and the southern or southeastern part of Lackawanna County. It is mostly in Scranton and Roaring Brook Township. However, small areas are in Moosic and Dunmore. The stream's mouth is in the United States Geological Survey quadrangle of Scranton. However, its mouth is in the quadrangle of Moscow. The stream also passes through the quadrangles of Olyphant and Avoca. Its course is circuitous, but it flows in a generally northwesterly direction.

Upstream of the Interstate 81 crossing, the watershed of Stafford Meadow Brook is mainly forested and mountainous, with little development. The upper reaches are completely forested, with several beaver swamps and wetlands in its floodplain. Downstream of Interstate 81, however, it transitions to a developed watershed, with commercial, industrial, and residential land uses.

There are a number of wetland complexes in the watershed of Stafford Meadow Brook. These include Bear Swamp (which is at the stream's headwaters), Simerson Marsh, and Little Virginia. The first of these is a Pocono wetland bog. Lakes in the watershed include Lake Scranton, the District Number Fifty-Nine Reservoir, the Williams Bridge Reservoir, and Hazard Pond. Lake Scranton and the Williams Bridge Reservoir are used as a water supply, with the former providing 22 million gallons of water per day. Together with Roaring Brook and Spring Brook, it provides a substantial portion of the water supply of the Lackawanna Valley. Downstream of Lake Scranton, the watershed contains a lake used by the Montage Mountain Ski Resort for snowmaking.

The remains of iron ore quarries occur along Stafford Meadow Creek downstream of Lake Scranton. In southern Scranton, the stream flows through old residential neighborhoods. Interstate 380 passes near the headwaters of Stafford Meadow Brook. Interstate 81 is also in the stream's watershed, as is Pennsylvania Route 307 and Pittston Avenue. In 2013, it was estimated that there were four stormwater detention facilities in one reach of the watershed.

== History and etymology ==
Stafford Meadow Brook was entered into the Geographic Names Information System on August 2, 1979. Its identifier in the Geographic Names Information System is 1199983. The stream is named after Captain John Stafford, who started a sawmill on its banks in 1790.

The Abbott family once constructed a sawmill on Stafford Meadow Brook near Scranton. It eventually came to be owned by the Slocum family. The Lackawanna Iron and Coal Company historically had substantial operations in the watershed of the stream. The company was closely linked to the stream's watershed during its development in the 1840s. In the 1880s, they constructed several iron ore quarries along the stream. In the early 1900s, the main industries in the watershed of Stafford Meadow Brook included agriculture and coal mining. The stream became a major water supply by the early 1900s, when it was used as such by the Scranton Gas and Water Company. It continues to be used as a water supply in the 21st century. Historic sites in the watershed of Stafford Meadow Brook include the Pennsylvania Gravity Railroad and Ore Mine Road. The stream also passes by St. Mary's Cemetery. Several old rail corridors remain in the watershed: the Erie and Wyoming Valley Railroad, the Lackawanna and Wyoming Valley Railroad, the remains of the Pennsylvania Coal Company Gravity Railroad, and the Lackawanna Coal and Iron Company gravity railroad. As of 2001, there are plans to revive the Lackawanna and Wyoming Valley Railroad as a freight and tourist line.

In the early 1900s, major communities in the watershed of Stafford Meadow Brook included Scranton. Scranton had a population of 129,867 at the time.

A masonry arch bridge carrying Webster Avenue was constructed over Stafford Meadow Brook in 1885 and repaired in 1947. It is 28.9 feet (8.8 m) long. A concrete slab bridge carrying State Route 3021/Stafford Avenue over the stream was built in 1925. It is 26.9 feet (8.2 m) long and is situated in Scranton. A concrete tee beam bridge carrying Pennsylvania Route 307 over the stream was constructed in 1934 and repaired in 1939. This bridge is in Roaring Brook Township and is 29.9 feet (9.1 m) long. In 1943, a two-span concrete culvert bridge was built over the creek. It is 23.0 feet (7.0 m) long and carries South Washington Avenue. Another bridge of the same type, but with only one span, was built in Scranton in 1964. This bridge is 26.9 feet (8.2 m) in length and carries US Route 11 over the stream. Another concrete culvert bridge was built across the stream in Roaring Brook Township in 1989. It is 25.9 feet (7.9 m) long and carries Pennsylvania Route 307.

Stafford Meadow Brook has been studied a number of times. In 1980, the Pennsylvania Fish and Boat Commission collected data on the stream. In 2003, it was studied by Popp & McGurl. In the 1940s, the Scranton-Spring Brook Water Company owned 93 percent of the upper 11.5 square miles (30 km^{2}) of the watershed. The Pennsylvania Gas & Water Company owned most of the upper three quarters of the watershed until 1996. Ownership of the land passed to the Theta Land Company a few years later. Some sections of the land are undergoing timbering.

== Biology ==
From its headwaters downstream to the downstream-most crossing of the Scranton/Moosic line, the drainage basin of Stafford Meadow Brook is designated as a High-Quality Coldwater Fishery and a Migratory Fishery. From that point downstream to its mouth, the stream is classified as a Warmwater Fishery and a Migratory Fishery. A large section of the stream from its headwaters to the lower Pennsylvania Route 307 bridge meets the criteria for an Exceptional Value designation. Wild trout naturally reproduce in the stream at least as far upstream as river mile 6.82 and as far downstream as its mouth. The stream was stocked with 500 adult and fingerling rainbow trout in 1894–1895. In 1984, the Pennsylvania Fish Commission speculated that there were native brook trout in part of the stream.

Numerous macroinvertebrate species have been observed in Stafford Meadow Brook, including 18 taxa in the orders Ephemeroptera, Plecoptera, and Trichoptera. In a 210-individual sample, the most common taxa were the genus Hydropsyche (62 individuals), the family Chironomidae (27 individuals), and the genera Amphinemura (23 individuals), Lectura (14 individuals), Hexatoma (11 individuals), and Lanthus (10 individuals). Less common were the genera Baetis and Ephemerella (9 individuals each), Acroneuria (6 individuals), Cheumatopsyche and Rhyacophila (4 individuals each), and Simulium (3 individuals). There were four genera with two individuals each and 13 genera and one order with one individual each.

More than 600,000 trees were planted in the watershed of Stafford Meadow Brook between 1912 and 1928. In the early 2000s, the Lackawanna River Watershed Conservation Plan recommended creating a 1000-foot riparian buffer around the Stafford Meadow Brook corridor. In lacks a riparian buffer in parts of Scranton. However, there are large hemlock stands along the stream above Lake Scranton. The wetlands along the stream provide an important habitat for wildlife and plant life. Beavers have also constructed ponds along some reaches of the stream. Bears have also historically been observed in the area.

The modified Hilsenhoff Biotic Index value of Stafford Meadow Brook is 3.82. The modified EPT Index value is 14 and the total taxa richness is 33.

== Recreation ==
One part of Stafford Meadow Brook is in the vicinity of the Montage Mountain Ski Resort and a multi-sport stadium. In the early 2000s, the Lackawanna River Watershed Conservation Plan recommended that Roaring Brook Township and the city of Scranton include protection of Stafford Meadow Brook in their zoning plans. It also recommended the construction of a trail along the stream. This trail could link with the Lackawanna River Heritage Trail. Additionally, there is a walking trail around Lake Scranton. This trail is 4 miles (6.4 km) long.

== See also ==
- Keyser Creek, next tributary of the Lackawanna River going downriver
- Roaring Brook (Lackawanna River), next tributary of the Lackawanna River going upriver
- List of rivers of Pennsylvania
- List of tributaries of the Lackawanna River
