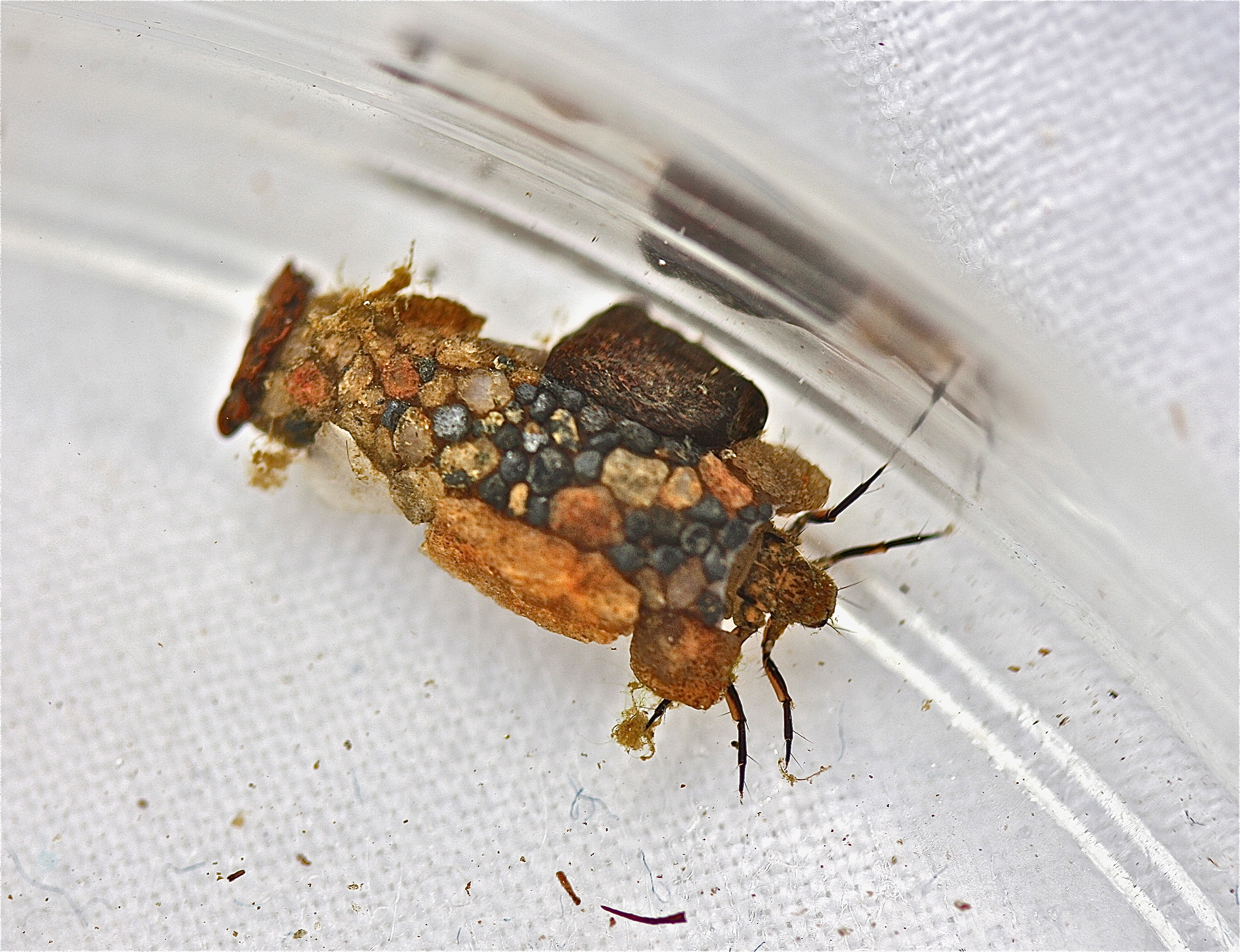

Scientific classification
- Kingdom: Animalia
- Phylum: Arthropoda
- Clade: Pancrustacea
- Class: Insecta
- Order: Trichoptera
- Family: Thremmatidae
- Genus: Neophylax
- Species: N. oligius

Binomial name
- Neophylax oligius Ross, 1938

= Neophylax oligius =

Species of caddisfly

Neophylax oligius, the autumn sedge, is a species of caddisfly in the family Uenoidae. It is found in North America.
