= East Branch Roaring Brook =

Physical characteristics
- Source
  - location: pond near Freytown in Sterling Township, Pennsylvania
  - elevation: between 1,940 and 1,960 feet (590 and 600 m)
- Mouth
  - location: Roaring Brook in Covington Township, Lackawanna County, Pennsylvania
  - coordinates: 41°18′32″N 75°29′19″W
  - elevation: 1,654 ft (504 m)
- Length: 3.7 mi (6.0 km)
- Basin size: 5.90 mi^{2} (15.3 km^{2})

Basin features
- Progression: Roaring Brook → Lackawanna River → Susquehanna River → Chesapeake Bay

East Branch Roaring Brook is a tributary of Roaring Brook in Wayne County and Lackawanna County, in Pennsylvania in the United States. It is approximately 3.7 miles (6.0 km) long and flows through Sterling Township in Wayne County and Madison Township and Covington Township in Lackawanna County. The watershed of the stream has an area of 5.90 square miles (15.3 km^{2}). Wild trout naturally reproduce within the stream and many macroinvertebrate taxa inhabit it. The surficial geology in the area consists of Wisconsinan Till, Wisconsinan Ice-Contact Stratified Drift, alluvium, bedrock, fill, sand and gravel pits, and wetlands.

== Course ==
East Branch Roaring Brook begins in a pond near Freytown, in Sterling Township, Wayne County. It flows north for a short distance before turning southwest and exiting Wayne County. Upon exiting Wayne County, the stream enters Madison Township, Lackawanna County. It very briefly passes through the southernmost corner of that township and enters Covington Township. After a few tenths of a mile, it turns west-northwest and enters a wetland. It then turns west-northwest for several tenths of a mile before turning northwest for several tenths of a mile and then turning south. The stream turns west-northwest for several tenths of a mile before turning north and then southwest. After several tenths of a mile, it turns northwest and reaches its confluence with Roaring Brook at the Hollister Reservoir.

East Branch Roaring Brook joins Roaring Brook 17.14 miles (27.58 km) upstream of its mouth.

== Geography and geology ==
The elevation near the mouth of East Branch Roaring Brook is 1,654 feet (504 m) above sea level. The elevation near the source of the stream is between 1,940 and 1,960 feet (590 and 600 m) above sea level.

The surficial geology in the vicinity of the lower reaches of East Branch Roaring Brook alluvium, Wisconsinan Ice-Contact Stratified Drift, bedrock consisting of conglomeratic sandstone and sandstone and shale, fill, and sand and gravel pits. Further upstream, the surficial geology mainly consists of a glacial or resedimented till known as Wisconsinan Till. However, there are large patches of wetland and smaller patches of bedrock and alluvium.

== Watershed ==
The watershed of East Branch Roaring Brook has an area of 5.90 square miles (15.3 km^{2}). The stream is entirely within the United States Geological Survey quadrangle of Sterling.

East Branch Roaring Brook is a major tributary of Roaring Brook. There are Exceptional Value wetlands in the stream's vicinity. A reservoir known as Small Potential Reservoir #37-9 was proposed in the State Water Plan in 1978. The reservoir was to be situated on East Branch Roaring Brook and be dammed by a dam with a height of 46 feet (14 m). It was intended to be a multipurpose structure.

== History ==
East Branch Roaring Brook was entered into the Geographic Names Information System on August 2, 1979. Its identifier in the Geographic Names Information System is 1173767.

The PPL Corporation has received a permit to construct an electric aerial line over East Branch Roaring Brook and nearby wetlands.

== Biology ==
Wild trout naturally reproduce in East Branch Roaring Brook from river mile 2.48 downstream to its mouth. The stream meets the criteria to be an Exceptional Value waters candidate. The creek is considered to be a High-Quality Coldwater Fishery.

Numerous macroinvertebrate taxa have been observed in East Branch Roaring Brook, including 17 genera from the orders Ephemeroptera, Plecoptera, and Trichoptera. In a 212-individual sample taken near the stream's mouth, the most common taxa included the genus Epeorus (49 individuals), the genus Ephemerella (43 individuals), the genus Hydropsyche (20 individuals), the family Chironomidae (11 individuals), and the genus Nigronia (10 individuals). Less common taxa included the genus Psephenus (9 individuals), the genus Rhyacophila (9 individuals), the genus Acroneuria (8 individuals), the genus Neophylax (8 individuals), the genus Hexatoma (6 individuals), and the genus Agapetus (5 individuals). Rarer taxa included the genus Argentina (4 individuals); the genera Baetis, Stenonema, and Paraleptophlebia (3 individuals each); and the genus Cambarus. Only one individual each of several genera were observed: Drunella, Pteronarcys, Pycnopsyche, Promoresia, and Prosimulium.

== See also ==
- Bear Brook (Roaring Brook), next tributary of Roaring Brook going downstream
- Lake Run, next tributary of Roaring Brook going upstream
- List of rivers of Pennsylvania
- List of tributaries of the Lackawanna River
