= Emerson Run =

Physical characteristics
- Source
  - location: wetland in a broad and shallow valley in Covington Township, Lackawanna County, Pennsylvania
  - elevation: between 1,840 and 1,860 feet (560 and 570 m)
- Mouth
  - location: Lake Run in Covington Township, Lackawanna County, Pennsylvania
  - coordinates: 41°17′38″N 75°29′20″W
  - elevation: 1,709 ft (521 m)
- Length: 1.8 mi (2.9 km)
- Basin size: 1.58 mi^{2} (4.1 km^{2})

Basin features
- Progression: Lake Run → Roaring Brook → Lackawanna River → Susquehanna River → Chesapeake Bay

Emerson Run is a tributary of Lake Run in Lackawanna County, Pennsylvania, in the United States. It is approximately 1.8 miles (2.9 km) long and flows through Covington Township. The watershed of the stream has an area of 1.58 square miles (4.1 km^{2}). Wild trout naturally reproduce in the stream. The surficial geology in its vicinity consists of Wisconsinan Ice-Contact Stratified Drift, Wisconsinan Till, bedrock, wetlands, peat bogs, and sand and gravel pits.

== Course ==
Emerson Run begins in a wetland in a broad and shallow valley in Covington Township. It flows east for several hundred feet before turning north for a similar distance. The stream then turns northwest for a few tenths of a mile before turning east and crossing Pennsylvania Route 435. Several tenths of a mile further downstream, it turns north for a short distance before turning east. After a short distance, it reaches its confluence with Lake Run.

Emerson Run joins Lake Run 0.84 miles (1.35 km) upstream of its mouth.

== Geography and geology ==
The elevation near the mouth of Emerson Run is 1,709 feet (521 m) above sea level. The elevation of the stream's source is between 1,840 and 1,860 feet (560 and 570 m) above sea level.

The path of a planned utility line crosses Emerson Run.

The surficial geology in the vicinity of the lower reaches of Emerson Run consists mainly of Wisconsinan Ice-Contact Stratified Drift. Slightly further from the stream is an area of a glacial till known as Wisconsinan Till and an area of bedrock consisting of conglomeratic sandstone, sandstone, and shale. There are also a few patches of sand and gravel pits. Along the stream's upper reaches, the surficial geology mainly consists of Wisconsinan Till. However, there are also patches of Wisconsinan Ice-Contact Stratified Drift and pits of sand and gravel. Additionally, there is a patch of wetlands and peat bogs near this reach of the stream.

== Watershed ==
The watershed of Lake Run has an area of 1.58 square miles (4.1 km^{2}). The stream's mouth is in the United States Geological Survey quadrangle of Sterling. However, its source is in the quadrangle of Moscow.

== History ==
Lake Run was entered into the Geographic Names Information System on August 2, 1979. Its identifier in the Geographic Names Information System is 1174218.

In the early 2000s, the Lackawanna River Watershed Conservation Plan recommended that Covington Township include protection of Emerson Run in its zoning plans.

== Biology ==
Wild trout naturally reproduce in a reach of Emerson Run, as far downstream as the stream's mouth. The stream is designated as a High-Quality Coldwater Fishery.

== See also ==
- List of rivers of Pennsylvania
- List of tributaries of the Lackawanna River
