= Langan Creek =

Creek in Lackawanna County, Pennsylvania, US

Physical characteristics
- Source
  - location: lake in Covington Township, Lackawanna County, Pennsylvania
  - elevation: between 1,760 and 1,780 feet (540 and 540 m)
- Mouth
  - location: Van Brunt Creek in Moscow, Lackawanna County, Pennsylvania
  - coordinates: 41°20′07″N 75°31′06″W
  - elevation: 1,535 ft (468 m)
- Length: 2.5 mi (4.0 km)

Basin features
- Progression: Van Brunt Creek → Roaring Brook → Lackawanna River → Susquehanna River → Chesapeake Bay

Langan Creek (also known as Langans Creek or Langan's Creek) is a tributary of Van Brunt Creek in Lackawanna County, Pennsylvania, in the United States. It is approximately 2.5 miles (4.0 km) long and flows through Covington Township and Moscow. The creek is inhabited by wild trout. Langan Swamp and Union Mills Swamp are in the watershed. The surficial geology in the area mainly consists of Wisconsinan Till, bedrock, peat bogs, and wetlands.

== Course ==
Langan Creek begins in a lake in Covington Township. It flows south for a few tenths of a mile and passes through Union Mill Swamp and then turns east for several tenths of a mile. The creek then enters Langan Swamp and turns northeast for a few tenths of a mile before turning east and then north-northwest. After several tenths of a mile, it enters Moscow and reaches its confluence with Van Brunt Creek.

== Hydrology, geography, and geology ==
The elevation near the mouth of Langan Creek is 1,535 feet (468 m) above sea level. The elevation of the creek's source is between 1,760 and 1,780 feet (540 and 540 m) above sea level.

The surficial geology in the vicinity of Langan Creek mainly consists of a glacial or resedimented till known as Wisconsinan Till. However, there are also large patches of bedrock consisting of colgomeratic sandstone, sandstone, and shale, as well as a large patch of wetland and some smaller patches. There is an area of peat bog in the watershed's upper reaches.

There is no stream gauge on Langan Creek. Sperry Homes, LLC has a permit to discharge stormwater into the creek in Covington Township.

== Watershed ==
Langan Creek is entirely within the United States Geological Survey quadrangle of Moscow.

Langan Creek is one of the main sources of flooding in Moscow. It and Van Brunt Creek are capable of causing major flooding in the borough. The creek was once dammed to create a pond. The pond has an area of 1 acre (4,000 m^{2}). Additionally, the creek drains a swamp known as Langan Swamp. Union Mill Swamp is also in the watershed.

== History and recreation ==
Langan Creek was entered into the Geographic Names Information System on August 2, 1979. Its identifier in the Geographic Names Information System is 1178864.

In the early 1900s, a bridge over Langan Creek in Covington Township was proposed. It was estimated to cost $800.

Langan Creek runs through the Moffat Estate, a 42-acre property in Covington Township. It was given to the township in 2002. In the early 2000s, the Lackawanna River Watershed Conservation Plan recommended that Covington Township and the borough of Moscow include protection of Langan Creek in their zoning plans.

A trail running from the sewer plant in Moscow to the Covington Park has been proposed. The trail would run past Langan Creek and the Moffat Estate and have a length of 1.5 to 2 miles (2.4 to 3.2 km). However, the trail is not planned for the near-term future as of 2013.

== Biology ==
Wild trout naturally reproduce in Langan Creek from its headwaters downstream to its mouth. The creek is a High-Quality Coldwater Fishery.

== See also ==
- List of rivers of Pennsylvania
- List of tributaries of the Lackawanna River
