= Roaring Brook (Lackawanna River tributary) =

River in Pennsylvania, US

Roaring Brook Roaring Branch Creek, Roaring Creek, Nay-aug
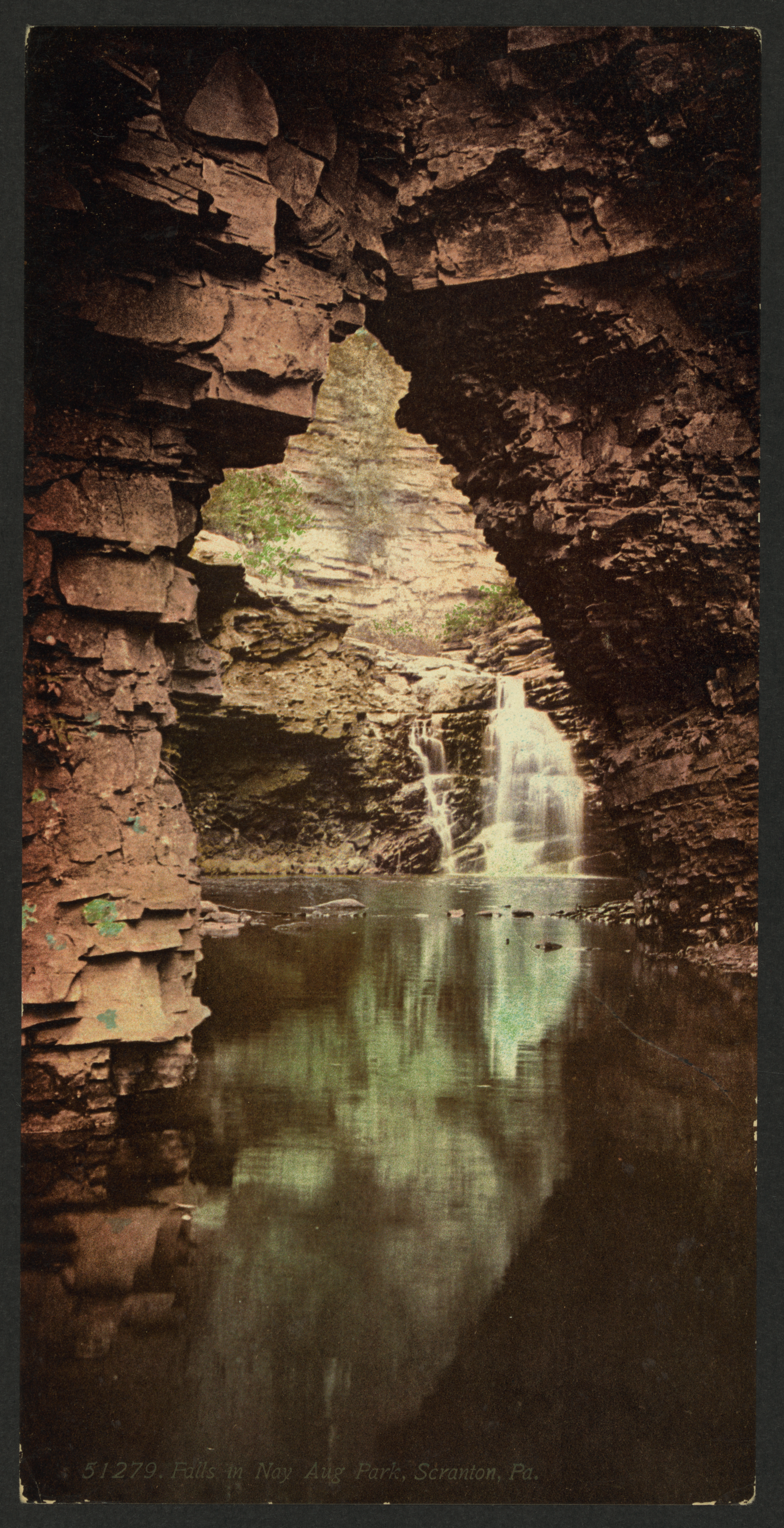
- 1898–1905 depiction of the Nay Aug Falls on Roaring Brook

Physical characteristics
- Source
  - location: small wetland in Covington Township, Lackawanna County, Pennsylvania
  - elevation: between 1,940 and 1,960 feet (590 and 600 m)
- Mouth
  - location: Lackawanna River in Scranton, Lackawanna County, Pennsylvania
  - coordinates: 41°24′07″N 75°40′24″W
  - elevation: 659 ft (201 m)
- Length: 21 mi (34 km)
- Basin size: 56.3 mi^{2} (146 km^{2})

Basin features
- Progression: Lackawanna River → Susquehanna River → Chesapeake Bay
- Tributaries
  - left: Lake Run, Van Brunt Creek
  - right: East Branch Roaring Brook, Bear Brook, Kellum Creek, White Oak Run, Rock Bottom Creek, Little Roaring Brook

Roaring Brook (also known as Roaring Branch Creek or Roaring Creek and historically known as Nay-aug) is a tributary of the Lackawanna River in Lackawanna County, Pennsylvania, in the United States. It is approximately 21 miles (34 km) long and flows through Covington Township, Madison Township, Moscow, Roaring Brook Township, Elmhurst Township, Dunmore, and Scranton. The watershed of the stream has an area of 56.3 square miles (146 km^{2}). Its named tributaries include Little Roaring Brook, Rock Bottom Creek, White Oak Run, Van Brunt Creek, Bear Brook, and East Branch Roaring Brook. It has a high level of water quality for much of its length. However, it is affected by abandoned mining land, stormwater, and other impacts in its lower reaches. Reservoirs in the watershed include the Hollister Reservoir, the Elmhurst Reservoir, and others. The stream also flows through the Nay Aug Gorge and passes over the Nay Aug Falls, which are on the National Register of Geologic Landmarks. It flows through a concrete channel in its lower reaches. The topography of the watershed contains rolling hills in its upper reaches and the mountainous land of the Moosic Mountains in its lower reaches.

Land uses in the watershed of Roaring Brook include forested land, agricultural land, and developed land such as high-density residential land and downtown commercial land. Abandoned mine land also occurs in the watershed and wetlands occur in some areas. Major roads in the stream's drainage basin include Interstate 380, Interstate 84, Pennsylvania Route 435, Pennsylvania Route 590, and Pennsylvania Route 690. Mills and forges were built along the stream in the late 1700s and early 1800s. During the 19th century, there was a substantial coal and iron industry in the watershed. Several railroads were also built in the stream's vicinity. Numerous bridges, including the Harrison Avenue Bridge (which is on the National Register of Historic Places) have been built across the stream as well. Additionally, sites such as the Scranton Iron Furnaces are in its watershed.

Roaring Brook is designated as a High-Quality Coldwater Fishery and a Migratory Fishery for part of its length and a Coldwater Fishery and a Migratory Fishery for the other part of its length. It is also Class A Wild Trout Waters from the Hollister Dam to the Elmhurst Reservoir. Numerous macroinvertebrate taxa have been observed in the stream and boreal forest trees inhabit wetlands in the watershed. A 12-mile (19-kilometer) rail trail connecting the Lackawanna River Heritage Trail to the Poconos via the Roaring Brook Corridor has been proposed.

== Course ==
Roaring Brook begins in a small wetland in Covington Township, a few tenths of a mile from the border between Lackawanna County and Wayne County. It flows west for a few tenths of a mile before turning west-northwest for several tenths of a mile. The stream then turns northwest for several tenths of a mile before receiving Lake Run, its first named tributary, from the left. It then enters the Hollister Reservoir, where it receives the tributary East Branch Roaring Brook from the right. After passing through the reservoir, the stream turns north-northwest. It soon begins flowing along the border between Covington Township and Madison Township and begins to flow alongside Pennsylvania Route 435. The stream enters Moscow and receives the tributary Bear Brook from the right and the tributary Van Brunt Creek from the left. It continues flowing north-northwest and receives the tributary Kellum Creek after several tenths of a mile.

Roaring Brook then enters the Elmhurst Reservoir, where it briefly enters Roaring Brook Township before entering Elmhurst Township and receiving the tributary White Oak Run from the right. The stream continues flowing north-northwest, crossing Pennsylvania Route 435 and reentering Roaring Brook Township several tenths of a mile further downstream. It then crosses Interstate 84 and receives the tributary Rock Bottom Creek from the right as its valley becomes much deeper and narrower. It continues flowing north-northwest for more than a mile alongside Pennsylvania Route 435 before turning south-southwest and briefly entering Dunmore before reentering Roaring Brook Township. After several tenths of a mile, the stream turns northwest for a few miles, crossing Interstate 84 and reentering Dunmore. It passes through the Scranton Water Company Reservoir and receives the tributary Little Roaring Brook from the right before turning south and then west. It then turns northwest and crosses Interstate 81 before turning southwest and passing through the Nay Aug Gorge. The stream turns northwest for several tenths of a mile before turning west-southwest and crossing US Route 11. After a few tenths of a mile, it reaches its confluence with the Lackawanna River.

Roaring Brook is approximately 21 miles (34 km) long. It joins the Lackawanna River 9.52 miles (15.32 km) upriver of its mouth.

=== Tributaries ===
Roaring Brook has eight named tributaries: Lake Run, East Branch Roaring Brook, Bear Brook, Van Brunt Creek, Kellum Creek, White Oak Run, Rock Bottom Creek, and Little Roaring Brook. Lake Run joins Roaring Brook 17.50 miles (28.16 km) upstream of its mouth and its watershed has an area of 3.44 square miles (8.9 km^{2}). East Branch Roaring Brook joins Roaring Brook 17.14 miles (27.58 km) upstream of its mouth and its watershed has an area of 5.90 square miles (15.3 km^{2}). Bear Brook joins Roaring Brook 14.48 miles (23.30 km) upstream of its mouth and its watershed has an area of 2.26 square miles (5.9 km^{2}). White Oak Run joins Roaring Brook 11.78 miles (18.96 km) upstream of its mouth and its watershed has an area of 3.22 square miles (8.3 km^{2}). Rock Bottom Creek joins Roaring Brook 9.84 miles (15.84 km) upstream of its mouth and its watershed has an area of 3.06 square miles (7.9 km^{2}). Little Roaring Brook joins Roaring Brook 4.70 miles (7.56 km) upstream of its mouth and its watershed has an area of 3.06 square miles (7.9 km^{2}).

== Hydrology ==
Roaring Brook has a high level of water quality downstream as far as Cobbs Gap. However, in its lower reaches, it is impacted by urban storm impacts and abandoned mining land. Silt from the DeNaples Auto Parts property washed into the stream in 1991. There are also stormwater impacts and combined sewer overflows in its lower reaches. Most of the stormwater flowing into the stream is associated with a combined sewer system in Scranton and Dunmore. Some highways in the watershed contribute stormwater as well. It is also affected by stormwater from the Daleville Shopping area, the village of Elmhurst, the borough of Moscow, Pennsylvania Route 435, Pennsylvania Route 590, and Pennsylvania Route 690. There are 12 stormwater detention facilities in the watershed's lower reaches.

The concentration of alkalinity in Roaring Brook between its headwaters and the Hollister Dam is 12 milligrams per liter. From the Hollister Dam to the Elmhurst Reservoir, the alkalinity concentration is 15 milligrams per liter. In the early 1900s, the stream was polluted by waste from coal mines 5 miles (8.0 km) upstream of its mouth. The stream experiences measurable flow loss, reaching up to 20 to 30 percent of its total flow in dry weather. In the 1970s, its turbidity ranged from 1 to 35 Jackson Turbidity Units at Scranton.

In the 1960s and 1970s, several measurements of the concentration of manganese in Roaring Brook at Scranton ranged from 0.7 to 21 milligrams per liter and measurements of the calcium concentration ranged from 0.8 to 31.2 milligrams per liter. The concentration of sodium ranged from 6 to 20 milligrams per liter in two measurements and the potassium concentration ranged from 1 to 3.5 milligrams per liter. Two measurements of the concentration of recoverable chromium ranged from less than 20 to 30 micrograms per liter. The concentration of recoverable copper (in unfiltered water only) ranged from 30 to 200 micrograms per liter. The concentration of recoverable iron (in unfiltered water only) ranged from 0 to 444,000 micrograms per liter. The concentration of recoverable lead in the stream's unfiltered waters was found twice to be 50 micrograms per liter. The concentration of recoverable manganese in the stream's unfiltered waters ranged from 20 to 1600 micrograms per liter. The concentration of recoverable zinc in the stream's unfiltered waters ranged from 160 to 380 micrograms per liter. Trace amounts of nickel and silver have been found in the stream. The concentration of recoverable zinc in the stream's unfiltered waters ranged between 100 and 70,000 micrograms per liter. The concentration of recoverable mercury in the stream (with unfiltered water) was once found to be less than 0.5 micrograms per liter.

In the 1960s and 1970s, several measurements of the concentration of dissolved oxygen in Roaring Brook at Scranton ranged from 10.0 to 12.6 milligrams per liter. The concentration of hydrogen ions in the stream had values ranging from 0.00004 to 0.04022 milligrams per liter. The carbon dioxide concentration was found to range from 0.3 to 252 milligrams per liter. Between 1928 and 1968, the bicarbonate concentration ranged from 22 to 141 milligrams per liter during three measurements. Between 1928 and the 1970s, the concentration of ammonia was found to range from 0 to 43.1 milligrams per liter and the nitrate concentration ranged from 0.1 to 18 milligrams per liter in three measurements in 1928 and 1968. The phosphorus concentration ranged from 0.040 to 13.6 milligrams per liter in the 1970s and the phosphate concentration ranged between 0 and 0.644 milligrams per liter.

The concentration of fluoride in Roaring Brook at Scranton was once measured to be 0.2 milligrams per liter (in unfiltered water only). The chloride concentration ranged from 2 to 214 milligrams per liter during several measurements in the 20th century. The sulfate concentration ranged from 8 to 4700 milligrams per liter. During two measurements, the silica concentration ranged from 5.20 to 8.30 milligrams per liter.

In two measurements in 1968, the specific conductance of Roaring Brook at Scranton ranged from 199 to 288 micro-siemens per centimeter at 25 °C (77 °F). The pH was measured to range from 4.4 to 8.8 and the acidity concentration ranged from 0 to 260 milligrams per liter in the 1960s and 1970s. The concentration of suspended solids ranged from 0 to 250 milligrams per liter and the concentration of settleable solids ranged between 0 and 4 milligrams per liter. The concentration of water hardness ranged from 12 to 160 milligrams per liter.

The peak annual discharge at the mouth of Roaring Brook has a 10 percent chance of reaching 5260 cubic feet per second. It has a 2 percent chance of reaching 10,500 cubic feet per second and a 1 percent chance of reaching 13,800 cubic feet per second. The peak annual discharge has a 0.2 percent chance of reaching 26,000 cubic feet per second.

Upstream of the tributary Little Roaring Brook, the peak annual discharge of Roaring Brook has a 10 percent chance of reaching 4520 cubic feet per second. It has a 2 percent chance of reaching 9100 cubic feet per second and a 1 percent chance of reaching 12,000 cubic feet per second. The peak annual discharge has a 0.2 percent chance of reaching 23,000 cubic feet per second.

== Geography, geology, and climate ==
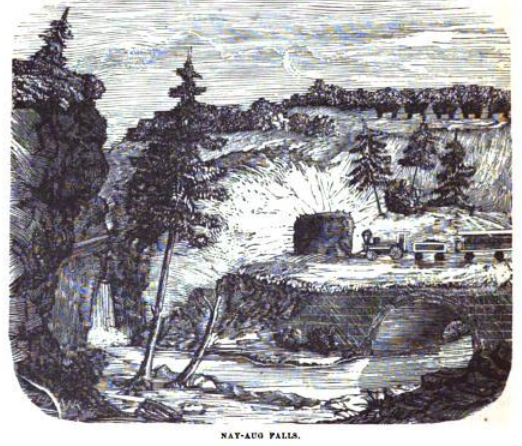
Nay Aug Falls

The elevation near the mouth of Roaring Brook is 659 feet (201 m) above sea level. The elevation of the stream's source is between 1,940 and 1,960 feet (590 and 600 m) above sea level. In its lower 15 miles (24 km), the stream's gradient is 62.8 feet (19.1 m) per mile. Horace Hollister's 1885 History of the Lackawanna Valley noted that the stream was shallow at that time. According to Hollister, the stream appears to have been much larger in ancient times. His book also described Roaring Brook as being "the noisiest tributary of the Lackawanna".

Roaring Brook begins on the Pocono Plateau. It flows through a water gap known as Cobbs Gap in the Moosic Mountains and there are numerous waterfalls and rapids along it. A waterfall known as the Nay Aug Falls is on Roaring Brook and the stream flows through the a gorge or canyon Nay Aug Gorge, which is listed on the National Register of Geologic Landmarks. The waterfall is a cascade with a height of 22 feet (6.7 m) and cuts through a soft siltstone formation and flows over conglomerate. A spring known as Chico's Spring is in the stream's watershed in Dunmore, as is a feature known as Barneys Ledge. The Madisonville Cliffs and Glen are located in the watershed in Madison Township and Covington Township. Additionally, numerous ponds, reservoirs, and water works are in the watershed.

The upper reaches of the watershed of Roaring Brook contain rolling hills. However, the lower reaches are mountainous, with steep, high hills and a narrow valley from Elmhurst downstream to Dunmore. The stream's channel is sinuous, but has retaining walls in its lower reaches. The stream flows past rock formations consisting of sandstone, shale, and conglomerate, along with some coal. However, all of its tributaries begin outside of the coal measures. In the Nay Aug Gorge, the stream flows through conglomerate of the Pocono Formation and sandstone of the Llwellyn Formation. A hard white conglomerate known as the Pottsville or Pocono Conglomerate occurs along the stream near the Nay Aug Falls. Erosion by the stream in the Nay Aug Gorge has caused some areas to be undercut. There are also cliffs in the gorge, some over 100 feet (30 m) high.

Roaring Brook flows through a concrete U-channel from Cedar Avenue to its mouth. Both the manmade and the natural parts of the channel have steep banks, with heights on the order of 10 feet (3.0 m). An abandoned water power dam known as Step Falls is located on the stream in the Nay Aug Gorge. Much of the stream's channel and riparian area have been developed for flood control purposes. The stream is dammed by the Elmhurst Dam, which is in good condition as of May 1978.

Upstream of Nay Aug, the channel of Roaring Brook is mainly natural and ranges in width from 40 to 60 feet (12 to 18 m). It flows past some steep slopes and rock ledges in this reach. In its lower reaches, the stream flows through 30 pipes with diameters ranging from 6 to 48 inches (15 to 122 cm). A wide gravel and sand bar and some dumped trash occurs along the stream.

The average annual rate of precipitation in the watershed of Roaring Brook ranges from 35 to 45 inches (89 to 114 cm). In the 1960s and 1970s, several measurements of the water temperature of the stream ranged from 0.0 to 25.0 °C (32.0 to 77.0 °F). The temperature near the stream during several measurements in May 2013 ranged from 74 to 89 °F (23 to 32 °C).

== Watershed ==
The watershed of Roaring Brook has an area of 56.3 square miles (146 km^{2}). It is in the Lower North Branch Susquehanna drainage basin. The watershed mainly occupies the southeastern part of Lackawanna County. However, a small area of its watershed is in Sterling Township, in Wayne County. Upstream of the tributary Little Roaring Brook, the watershed has an area of 50 square miles (130 km^{2}). The mouth of the stream is in the United States Geological Survey quadrangle of Scranton. However, its source is in the quadrangle of Sterling. The stream also passes through the quadrangles of Olyphant and Moscow.

Roaring Brook is the largest tributary of the Lackawanna River. (Note: The watershed of Spring Brook is slightly larger, but Roaring Brook is a few miles longer.) It is a third-order stream. Its headwaters are situated immediately to the west of the watershed of the Lehigh River. Forested land comprises 70 percent of the watershed's upper reaches. 20 percent is agricultural land and 10 percent is developed. Some abandoned mine land occurs in the watershed as well. Other land uses include high-density residential land and downtown commercial land. Major roads in the watershed include Interstate 380, Interstate 84, Pennsylvania Route 435, Pennsylvania Route 590, and Pennsylvania Route 690. South Washington Avenue is located near the stream's mouth. The University of Scranton is located near the stream.

Wetlands in the watershed of Roaring Brook include the Freytown and Hollister swamps, which are located near the stream's headwaters. Between its headwaters and the Hollister Dam, the entire length of Roaring Brook is on private land. From the Hollister Dam to the Elmhurst Reservoir, 86 percent of its length is on private land. The remaining 14 percent is on private land that is open to access. Roaring Brook is one of the sources of flooding in Dunmore and Elmhurst Township.

== History ==
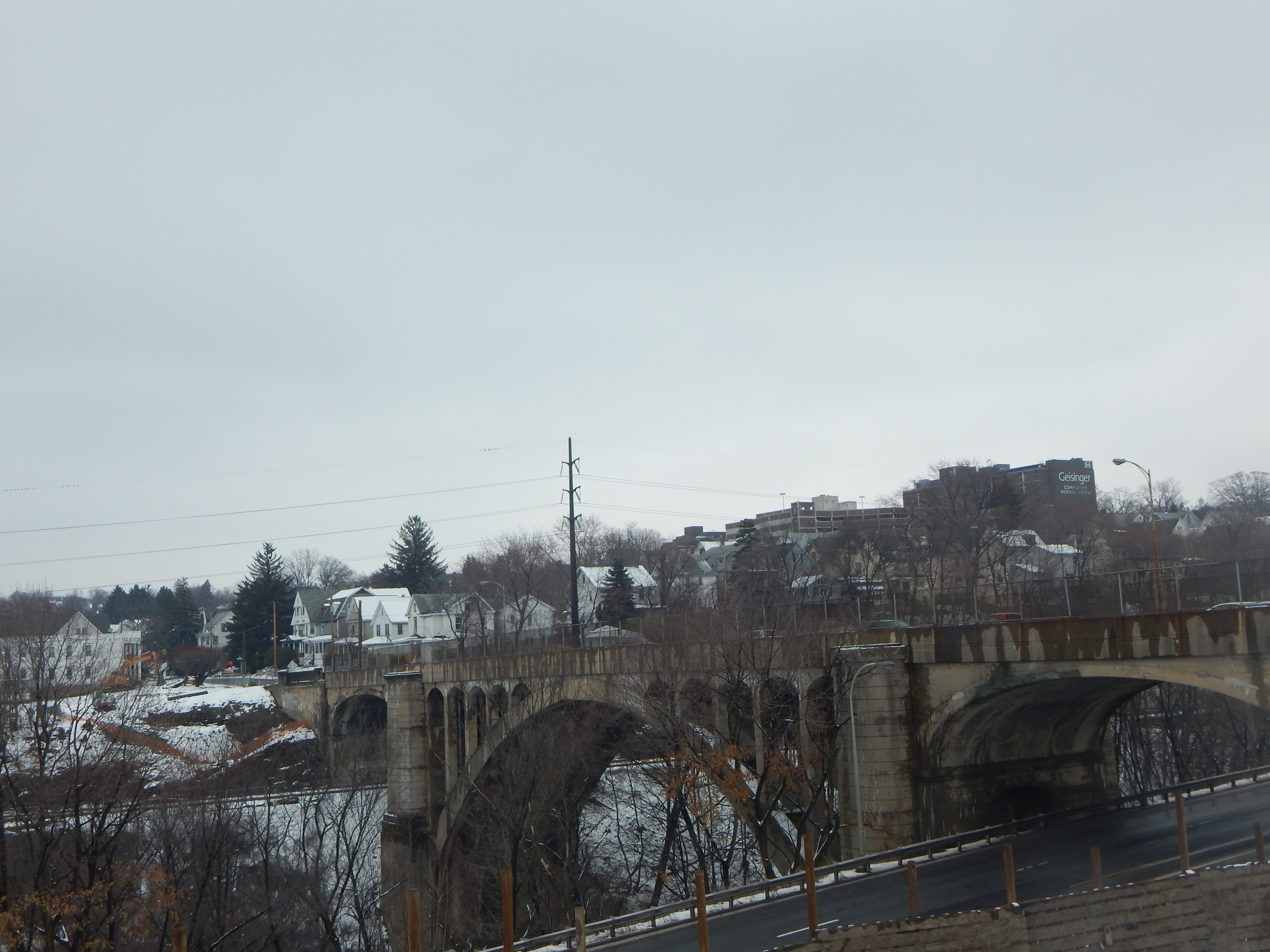
Harrison Avenue Bridge over Roaring Brook

Roaring Brook was entered into the Geographic Names Information System on August 2, 1979. Its identifier in the Geographic Names Information System is 1199947. The stream is also known as Roaring Creek or Roaring Branch Creek. The former variant name appears in United States Geological Survey topographical maps while the latter appears in Israel C. White's 1881 book The geology of Susquehanna County and Wayne County, Pennsylvania. The stream was historically known as Nay-aug. Nay-aug is a name derived from a Native American language meaning "roaring".

The ancient Native American village of Capoose used to be within a mile of the mouth of Roaring Brook. An Indian war path used to cross the stream near what is now Scranton. The Slocum family constructed a gristmill on the stream in 1780 and Philip Abbott constructed a gristmill on the stream in 1788. Ebenezer Slocum and Benjamin Slocum built a forge along the stream in 1799 or 1800. Rolling mills also operated along it in the 19th century. The first bridge in Madison Township was constructed over the stream in 1830 by Nathaniel Carter. A Mr. Rupert constructed the first sawmill in Moscow on Roaring Brook in 1831. An iron works industry known as the Slocum Brothers Mill was constructed on Roaring Brook 0.5 miles (0.80 km) upstream of its mouth in 1838. It struggled at first, but by 1846 managed to get a contract to produce iron T rails for the New York and Lake Erie Railroad. The furnaces of the Lackawanna Iron and Coal Company once operated near the stream. A sawmill was constructed over the stream in Covington Township in 1840 and the first gristmill in that township was built on Roaring Brook in the northeastern part of that township in 1864. The first bridge over the stream was built in 1859. In 1870, the Scranton family constructed a mansion on the stream.

In the early 1900s, the main industries in the watershed of Roaring Brook included agriculture, brick making, and coal mining. Around this time, the Delaware, Lackawanna and Western Railroad followed the stream throughout much of its length and the Erie Railroad followed the stream from Elmhurst to its mouth. The former was created by an 1852 merger of the Cobbs Gap and Delaware Railroad and the Lackawanna and Western Railroad, which were previously in the stream's watershed. The main stem was used as a water supply for Scranton by the Scranton Gas and Water Company. It was also used as an industrial water supply by the Spencer Coal Company. The watershed continues to supply water to the Lackawanna Valley in the 21st century. In the early 1900s, major communities in the watershed included Scranton, Dunmore, Moscow, and Elmhurst. At the time, their populations were 129,867, 17,615, 650, and 379, respectively.

A steel truss bridge with a length of 50.9 feet (15.5 m) was constructed over Roaring Brook in 1907 and is closed. A concrete arch bridge with a length of 400 feet (120 m) was built over the stream in 1917 and another bridge of the same type, but with a length of 392.1 feet (119.5 m), was constructed in 1935. A steel girder and floorbeam system bridge with a length of 76.1 feet (23.2 m) was also constructed over the stream in that year and was repaired in 2006. A concrete culvert bridge with a length of 77.1 feet (23.5 m) was built across the stream in 1948 and three prestressed box beam or girders bridges carrying Ash Street, State Route 2005/Market Street, and State Route 3023/Cedar Ave were built in 1958. Another bridge of that type, with a length of 65.9 feet (20.1 m), was built over the creek in 1961. A bridge carrying US Route 11 over the creek was built in 1969, as was a prestressed box beam or girders bridge. Their lengths are 212.0 feet (64.6 m) and 78.1 feet (23.8 m), respectively.

A seven-span bridge carrying Interstate 84 over Roaring Brook was constructed in 1974. In 1979, a two-span prestressed box beam or girders bridge with a length of 106.0 feet (32.3 m) was constructed across the stream. I 1996 two ten-span bridges carrying Interstate 81 over the stream were built in Dunmore.

The last major flood in Dunmore occurred during Hurricane Diane in 1955. In this flood, floodwaters from Roaring Brook and another nearby stream damaged large areas in the lower-lying parts of Dunmore. The Pennsylvania Gas and Water Company's distribution system was severely damaged by the flood and a railroad car repair facility in the borough was so badly damaged that it was permanently abandoned. In 1960, the United States Army Corps of Engineers channelized 1 mile (1.6 km) of Roaring Brook. The stream is on the Pennsylvania Department of Environmental Protection Bureau of Abandoned Mine Restoration's priority list for restoration. The stream is described in the Lackawanna River Watershed Conservation Plan as being "significant natural and cultural resources". The stream has been studied several times. It was studied for the Pennsylvania Fish and Boat Commission by Daniels in 1979, Copeland in 1990, and Moase in 1996. In 1985, Rider and Blacksmith studied the stream for the Pennsylvania Department of Environmental Protection. In the early 2000s, Popps and McGurl studied the stream for the Lackawanna River Corridor Association. Large tracts of land in the watershed were once owned by the Pennsylvania Gas and Water Company, but later came to be owned by the Theta Corporation.

There are numerous historic sites in the watershed of Roaring Brook. These include the Scranton Iron Furnaces (a state historic site) in Scranton, the Erie Arch in Dunmore, a Pennsylvania Coal Company building in Dunmore, the Pennsylvania Gravity Railroad in Dunmore and other locations, and the Mill Street Tubs and the Nay Aug tubs in Dunmore. Additionally, the Harrison Avenue Bridge, which crosses Roaring Brook in Scranton, is on the National Register of Historic Places and the Historic American Buildings Survey. The bridge is "a symbol of the city's [Scranton's] progressive era in the early 20th century".

== Biology ==
Wild trout naturally reproduce in Roaring Brook from its headwaters downstream to its mouth. The stream's drainage basin is designated as a High-Quality Coldwater Fishery and a Migratory Fishery from its headwaters downstream to the Elmhurst Reservoir. From the Elmhurst Reservoir downstream to its mouth, it is a Coldwater Fishery and a Migratory Fishery. The stream is also considered by the Pennsylvania Fish and Boat Commission to be Class A Wild Trout Waters for both brook trout and brown trout from its headwaters to the Hollister Dam, a distance of 3.9 miles (6.3 km). From the Hollister Dam to the Elmhurst Reservoir (a distance of 2.8 miles (4.5 km)), it is Class A Wild Trout Waters for brook trout. The tributary Lake Run is also Class A Wild Trout Waters for brook trout and brown trout and the tributary Kellum Creek is Class A Wild Trout Waters for brook trout. Upstream of the Hollister Reservoir, Roaring Brook meets the criteria for an Exceptional Value designation.

Wolves, bears, wildcats, and panthers historically inhabited the area in the vicinity of Roaring Brook.

Numerous macroinvertebrate taxa have been observed in Roaring Brook upstream of the Hollister Reservoir, including 16 genera from the orders Ephemeroptera, Plecoptera, and Trichoptera. In a 212-individual sample, 2 individuals from the family Baetidae, 25 individuals from the family Ephemerellidae, 35 from the family Heptageniidae, 2 from the family Leptophlebiidae, 1 from the family Leuctridae, and 11 from the family Perlidae were observed. Additionally, the sample included 5 individuals from the family Glossosomatidae, 61 from the family Hydropsychidae, 5 from the family Philopotamidae, 1 from the family Polycentropodidae, 4 from the family Rhyacophilidae, and 2 from the family Uenoidae. Additionally, there was 1 individual from the family Elmidae, 5 from the family Psephenidae, 3 from the family Corydalidae, 1 from the family Aeshnidae, 42 from the family Chironomidae, 5 from the family Tipulidae, and 1 from the family Cambaridae.

Boreal forest trees such as black spruce, paper birch, and tamarack inhabit wetlands in the watershed of Roaring Brook. Plants such as mountain laurel, leather leaf, pitcher plant, rhododendron, huckleberry, and lady's slipper inhabit bogs in these wetlands. Old-growth forests containing oak, pine, and hemlock trees are also present in the Nay Aug Gorge. Upstream of Ridge Row, the stream's riparian buffer is wooded with some rock outcrops. Upstream of Nay Aug, the riparian canopy is mostly intact. Some hemlock trees in the Nay Aug Gorge have been affected by hemlock wooly adelgid.

The modified Hilsenhoff Biotic Index value of Roaring Brook upstream of the Hollister Reservoir is 3.25 and the modified EPT Index value is 12. The total taxa richness is 26. Downstream of the reservoir, the modified Hilsenhoff Biotic Index value is 3.1 and the modified EPT Index value is 17. The total taxa richness is 26.

== Recreation ==
In the early 2000s, the Lackawanna River Watershed Conservation Plan recommended constructing a greenway and connecting trail along Roaring Brook. Planned trails in the greenway include the North Pocono rail trail and a link to the Nay Aug Park. The conservation plan recommended linking such a trail to the Lackawanna River Heritage Trail. A proposed pedestrian loop trail would have a footbridge over the stream.

Tourism opportunities in the watershed of Roaring Brook include the Steamtown excursion line, the Lackawanna Trolley line. A city park known as Oakmont Park is in the vicinity of the stream. There are extensive areas of asphalt in the park, but adding green infrastructure has been proposed. A 142-acre public park known as the Nay Aug Park is also in the watershed. It was founded and 1893 and was popular until the 1950s, when the area entered an economic decline. The park once had a wooden roller coaster and a small zoo, the latter of which was reopened in 2003. There is a ball field at the mouth of the stream.

== See also ==
- Stafford Meadow Brook, next tributary of the Lackawanna River going downriver
- Meadow Brook (Lackawanna River), next tributary of the Lackawanna River going upriver
- List of rivers of Pennsylvania
- List of tributaries of the Lackawanna River
