= Bear Brook (Roaring Brook tributary) =

Bear Brook Bear Brook Creek

Physical characteristics
- Source
  - location: hill in Madison Township, Lackawanna County, Pennsylvania
  - elevation: between 1,800 and 1,820 feet (550 and 550 m)
- Mouth
  - location: Roaring Brook in Moscow, Lackawanna County, Pennsylvania
  - coordinates: 41°20′19″N 75°30′50″W
  - elevation: 1,473 ft (449 m)
- Length: 3.0 mi (4.8 km)
- Basin size: 2.26 mi^{2} (5.9 km^{2})

Basin features
- Progression: Roaring Brook → Lackawanna River → Susquehanna River → Chesapeake Bay

Bear Brook (also known as Bear Brook Creek) is a tributary of Roaring Brook in Lackawanna County, Pennsylvania, in the United States. It is approximately 3.0 miles (4.8 km) long and flows through Madison Township and Moscow. The watershed of the stream has an area of 2.26 square miles (5.9 km^{2}). Wild trout naturally reproduce within it. The surficial geology in the vicinity of the stream's lower reaches consists of Wisconsinan Till, Wisconsinan Ice-Contact Stratified Drift, bedrock, and alluvium. A bridge carrying Pennsylvania Route 690 crosses the stream.

== Course ==
Bear Brook begins on a hill in Madison Township. It flows northwest for several tenths of a mile, flowing down the hill and entering a lake. From the western end of the lake, the stream flows west-southwest for more than a mile in a valley alongside Pennsylvania Route 690. It eventually passes a few ponds or lakes and turns west for several tenths of a mile, entering Moscow. The stream then turns south for a few hundred feet before turning west for a short distance, crossing Pennsylvania Route 690 and reaching its confluence with Roaring Brook.

Bear Brook joins Roaring Brook 14.48 miles (23.30 km) upstream of its mouth.

== Geography and geology ==
The elevation near the mouth of Bear Brook is 1,473 feet (449 m) above sea level. The elevation of the stream's source is between 1,800 and 1,820 feet (550 and 550 m) above sea level.

The surficial geology in the vicinity of Bear Brook in its lower reaches mainly consists of Wisconsinan Ice-Contact Stratified Drift, Wisconsinan Till, and bedrock consisting of conglomeratic sandstone, sandstone, and shale. However, there are also a few patches of alluvium.

== Watershed ==
The watershed of Bear Brook has an area of 2.26 square miles (5.9 km^{2}). The mouth of the stream is in the United States Geological Survey quadrangle of Moscow. However, its source is in the quadrangle of Sterling.

== History ==
Bear Brook was entered into the Geographic Names Information System on August 2, 1979. Its identifier in the Geographic Names Information System is 1168851.

In the early 1900s, the Lackawanna County Commissioners received permission to construct a bridge over the creek on Nork Road. A concrete slab bridge carrying Pennsylvania Route 690 was constructed across Bear Brook in 1933. This bridge is 25.9 feet (7.9 m) long and is situated in Moscow.

In the early 2000s, the Lackawanna River Watershed Conservation Plan recommended that Madison Township include protection of Langan Creek in its zoning plans.

== Biology ==
Wild trout naturally reproduce in Bear Brook from its upper reaches downstream to its mouth.

== See also ==
- Van Brunt Creek, next tributary of Roaring Brook going downstream
- East Branch Roaring Brook, next tributary of Roaring Brook going upstream
- List of rivers of Pennsylvania
- List of tributaries of the Lackawanna River
