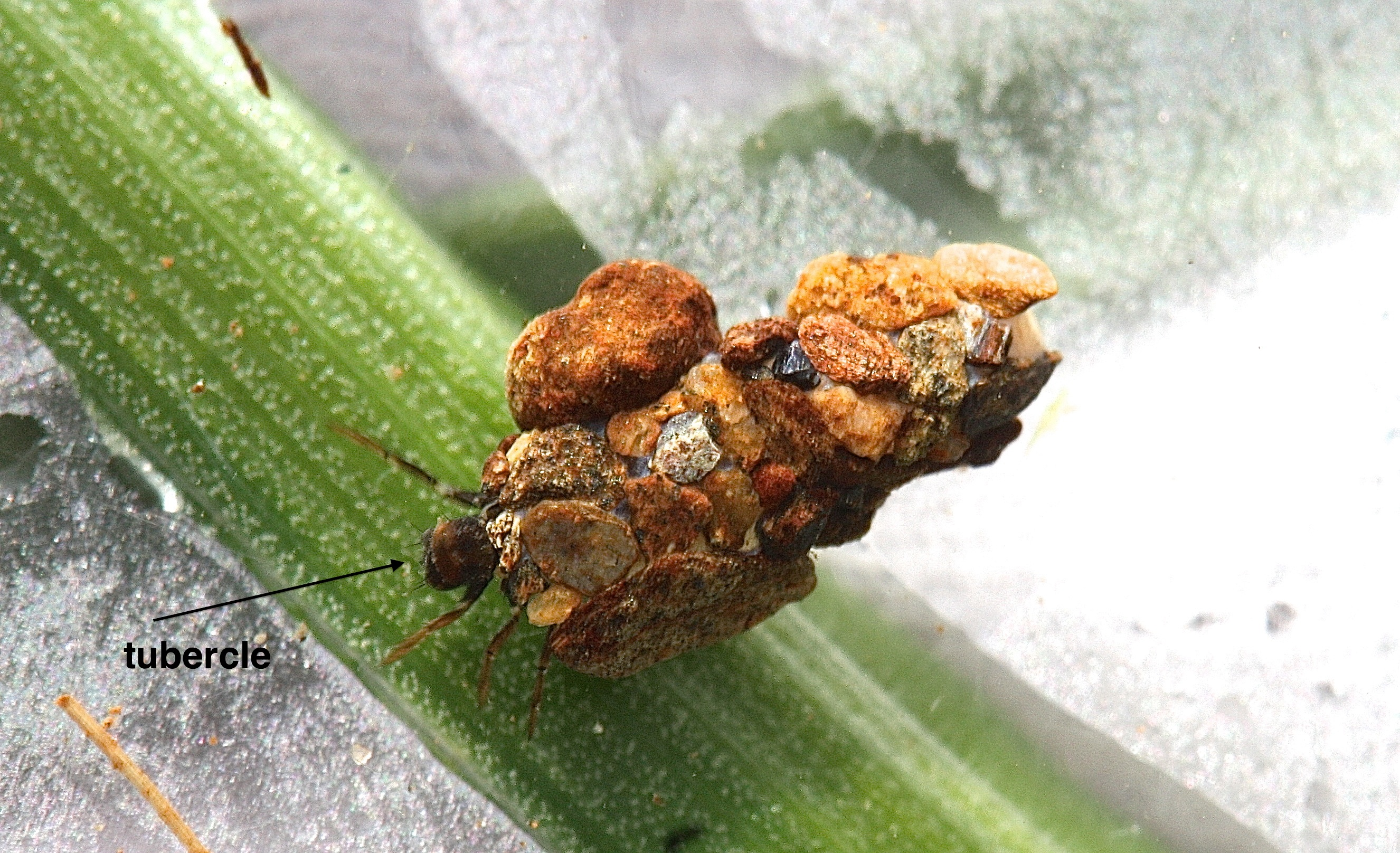
- Neophylax Aniqua Larva

Scientific classification
- Kingdom: Animalia
- Phylum: Arthropoda
- Class: Insecta
- Order: Trichoptera
- Family: Thremmatidae
- Genus: Neophylax
- Species: N. aniqua

Binomial name
- Neophylax aniqua Ross, 1947

= Neophylax aniqua =

Species of caddisfly

Neophylax aniqua is a species of caddisfly in the family Thremmatidae. It is found in North America.
