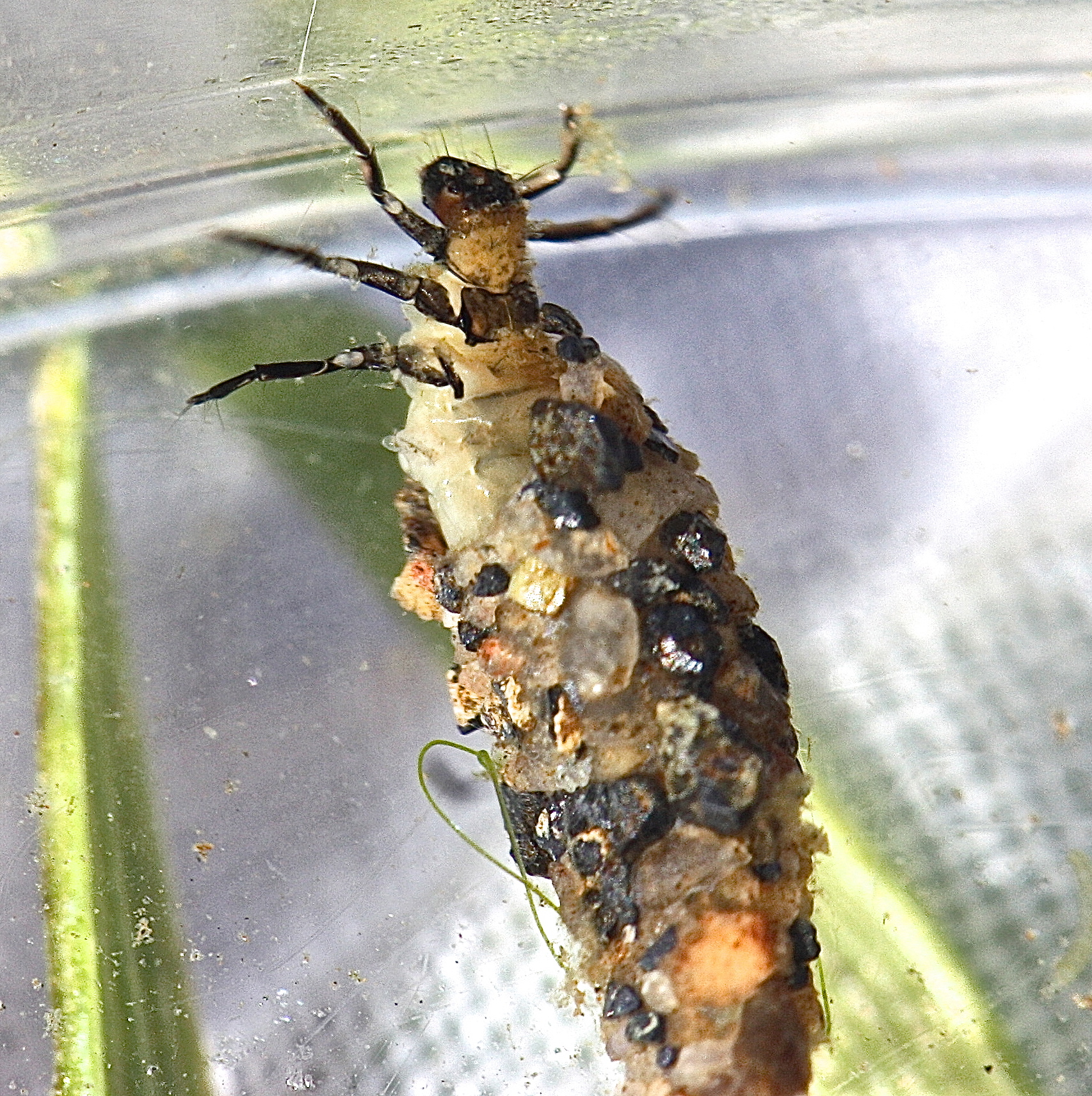

Scientific classification
- Kingdom: Animalia
- Phylum: Arthropoda
- Class: Insecta
- Order: Trichoptera
- Family: Thremmatidae
- Genus: Neophylax
- Species: N. consimilis

Binomial name
- Neophylax consimilis Betten, 1934

= Neophylax consimilis =

Species of caddisfly

Neophylax consimilis is a species of caddisfly in the family Thremmatidae. It is found in North America.
