= White Oak Run (Roaring Brook tributary) =

Physical characteristics
- Source
  - location: Jefferson Township, Lackawanna County, Pennsylvania
  - elevation: between 1,680 and 1,700 feet (510 and 520 m)
- Mouth
  - location: Roaring Brook at the Elmhurst Reservoir in Roaring Brook Township, Pennsylvania
  - coordinates: 41°22′27″N 75°31′18″W
  - elevation: 1,417 ft (432 m)
- Length: 2.3 mi (3.7 km)
- Basin size: 3.22 sq mi (8.3 km^{2})

Basin features
- Progression: Roaring Brook → Lackawanna River → Susquehanna River → Chesapeake Bay
- Tributaries
  - right: two unnamed tributaries

White Oak Run is a tributary of Roaring Brook in Lackawanna County, Pennsylvania, in the United States. It is approximately 2.3 miles (3.7 km) long and flows through Jefferson Township, Madison Township, and Roaring Brook Township. The watershed of the stream has an area of 3.22 square miles (8.3 km^{2}). The stream flows through the Curtis Reservoir, which is dammed by the Curtis Dam. The surficial geology in the vicinity of the stream's mouth includes alluvium, Wisconsinan Till, and bedrock.

== Course ==
White Oak Run begins in Jefferson Township. It flows south-southwest for a few tenths of a mile and enters a lake. From the southern end of the lake, it flows south for several tenths of a mile before crossing Pennsylvania Route 590 and entering the Curtis Reservoir, where it flows southwest and enters Madison Township. At the southwestern edge of the reservoir, the stream turns west and enters Roaring Brook Township. A short distance further downstream, it reaches its confluence with Roaring Brook at the Elmhurst Reservoir.

White Oak Run joins Roaring Brook 11.78 miles (18.96 km) upstream of its mouth.

=== Tributaries ===
White Oak Run has no named tributaries. However, it does have two unnamed tributaries, both of which enter the stream from the right. One of the tributaries reaches its confluence with White Oak Run in the Curtis Reservoir.

== Geography and geology ==
The elevation near the mouth of White Oak Run is 1,417 feet (432 m) above sea level. The elevation near the source of the stream is between 1,680 and 1,700 feet (510 and 520 m).

The surficial geology in the vicinity of the lower reaches of White Oak Run consists of alluvium. Slightly further from the stream, there are areas of a glacial or resedimented till known as Wisconsinan Till, as well as bedrock containing conglomeratic sandstone, sandstone, and shale.

== Watershed ==
The watershed of White Oak Run has an area of 3.22 square miles (8.3 km^{2}). A reach of the stream is within the United States Geological Survey quadrangle of Moscow.

A 72-acre (29-hectare) reservoir known as the Curtis Reservoir is situated on White Oak Run. It is dammed by the Curtis Dam. In the late 1970s, the dam was judged to be unsafe, but not in critical condition. The reason for this was an inadequate spillway that was only capable of handling 17 percent of the Probable Maximum Flood without overtopping the dam. A failure of the Curtis Dam could cause a failure of the Elmhurst Dam further downstream, which could lead to a loss of life.

== History ==
White Oak Run was entered into the Geographic Names Information System on August 2, 1979. Its identifier in the Geographic Names Information System is 1193654.

In the early 2000s, the Lackawanna River Watershed Conservation Plan recommended that Roaring Brook Township, Madison Township, and Jefferson Township include protection of Keyser Creek in their zoning plans.

== See also ==
- Rock Bottom Creek, next tributary of Roaring Brook going downstream
- Kellum Creek, next tributary of Roaring Brook going upstream
- List of rivers of Pennsylvania
- List of tributaries of the Lackawanna River
