= Rock Bottom Creek =

Physical characteristics
- Source
  - location: lake in Jefferson Township, Lackawanna County, Pennsylvania
  - elevation: between 1,720 and 1,740 feet (520 and 530 m)
- Mouth
  - location: Roaring Brook in Roaring Brook Township, Pennsylvania
  - coordinates: 41°23′23″N 75°33′14″W
  - elevation: 1,306 ft (398 m)
- Length: 3.2 mi (5.1 km)
- Basin size: 3.06 mi^{2} (7.9 km^{2})

Basin features
- Progression: Roaring Brook → Lackawanna River → Susquehanna River → Chesapeake Bay

Rock Bottom Creek is a tributary of Roaring Brook in Lackawanna County, Pennsylvania, in the United States. It is approximately 3.2 miles (5.1 km) long and flows through Jefferson Township and Roaring Brook Township. The watershed of the creek has an area of 3.06 square miles (7.9 km^{2}). Wild trout naturally reproduce within it. The surficial geology in the creek's vicinity consists of Wisconsinan Till, alluvium, bedrock, fill, peat bogs, lakes, and wetlands.

== Course ==
Rock Bottom Creek begins in a lake in Jefferson Township. It flows south-southwest for several tenths of a mile before turning northwest and then southwest. After several tenths of a mile, it turns west-northwest, entering Roaring Brook Township and reaching Interstate 84 and flowing southwest in its median strip for several tenths of a mile. The creek then turns west and leaves behind the median strip. A short distance further downstream, it crosses Pennsylvania Route 435 and reaches its confluence with Roaring Brook.

Rock Bottom Creek joins Roaring Brook 9.84 miles (15.84 km) upstream of its mouth.

== Geography and geology ==
The elevation near the mouth of Rock Bottom Creek is 1,306 feet (398 m) above sea level. The elevation of the creek's source is between 1,720 and 1,740 feet (520 and 530 m) above sea level.

Rock Bottom Glen is in the watershed of Rock Bottom Creek, in Roaring Brook Township. The Muni Bogs are in the watershed in Jefferson Township.

The surficial geology in the vicinity of Rock Bottom Creek mainly consists of a glacial or resedimented till known as Wisconsinan Till. However, there are also large patches of bedrock consisting of conglomeratic sandstone, sandstone, and shale. There are smaller patches of wetlands, peat bogs, lakes and fill. There is also an area of alluvium at the mouth of the creek.

== Watershed and hydrology ==
The watershed of Rock Bottom Creek has an area of 3.06 square miles (7.9 km^{2}). The creek is entirely within the United States Geological Survey quadrangle of Olyphant.

The Jefferson Township Sewer Authority once applied for a permit to discharge into an unnamed tributary of Rock Bottom Creek.

== History ==
Rock Bottom Creek was entered into the Geographic Names Information System on August 2, 1979. Its identifier in the Geographic Names Information System is 1199396.

In the early 2000s, the Lackawanna River Watershed Conservation Plan recommended that Roaring Brook Township and Jefferson Township include protection of Keyser Creek in their zoning plans.

== Biology ==
Wild trout naturally reproduce in Rock Bottom Creek from its headwaters downstream to its mouth. An unnamed tributary of the creek is considered to be a High-Quality Coldwater Fishery. Rock Bottom Creek was stocked with trout in the early 1900s.

== See also ==
- Little Roaring Brook, next tributary of Roaring Brook going downstream
- White Oak Run (Roaring Brook), next tributary of Roaring Brook going upstream
- List of rivers of Pennsylvania
- List of tributaries of the Lackawanna River
