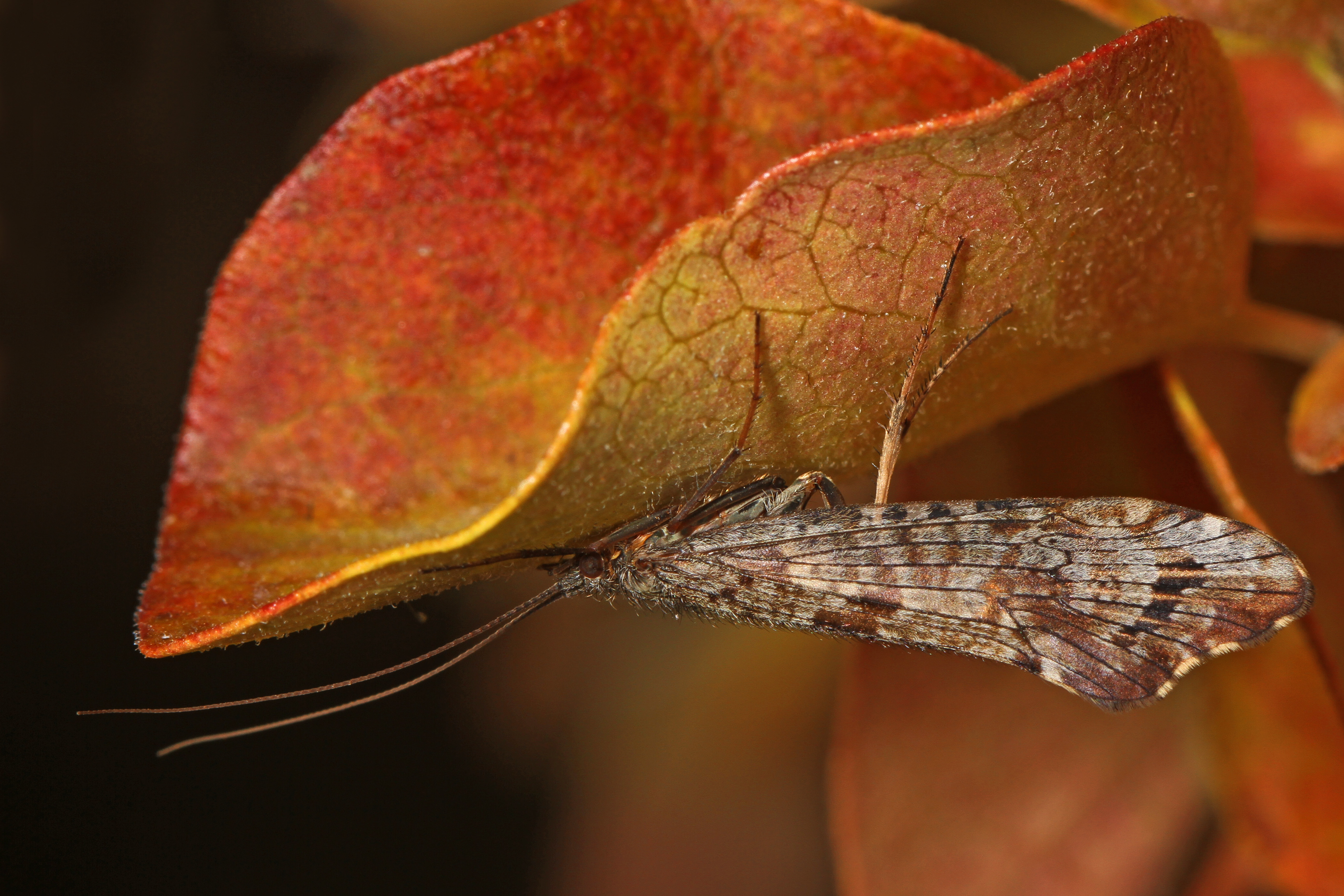

Scientific classification
- Kingdom: Animalia
- Phylum: Arthropoda
- Clade: Pancrustacea
- Class: Insecta
- Order: Trichoptera
- Family: Thremmatidae
- Genus: Neophylax
- Species: N. splendens

Binomial name
- Neophylax splendens Denning, 1948

= Neophylax splendens =

Species of caddisfly

Neophylax splendens is a species of caddisfly belonging to the family Thremmatidae. It is found in North America.
