= Van Brunt Creek =

Physical characteristics
- Source
  - location: Mullen Swamp in Roaring Brook Township, Pennsylvania
  - elevation: between 1,720 and 1,740 feet (520 and 530 m)
- Mouth
  - location: Roaring Brook in Moscow, Lackawanna County, Pennsylvania
  - coordinates: 41°20′23″N 75°30′52″W
  - elevation: 1,476 ft (450 m)
- Length: 3.3 mi (5.3 km)

Basin features
- Progression: Roaring Brook → Lackawanna River → Susquehanna River → Chesapeake Bay
- Tributaries
  - right: Langan Creek

Van Brunt Creek is a tributary of Roaring Brook in Lackawanna County, Pennsylvania, in the United States. It is approximately 3.3 miles (5.3 km) long and flows through Roaring Brook Township and Moscow. The creek has one named tributary, which is known as Langan Creek. At least two bridges have been constructed across Van Brunt Creek.

== Course ==
Van Brunt Creek begins in Mullen Swamp in Roaring Brook Township. It flows southeast for several tenths of a mile before turning south and entering Moscow. After a few tenths of a mile, the creek turns southeast for several tenths of a mile, crossing Pennsylvania Route 690, before turning east. After several tenths of a mile it receives Langan Creek, its only named tributary, from the right. It then crosses Pennsylvania Route 435 and turns north-northeast for a few tenths of a mile before reaching its confluence with Roaring Brook.

=== Tributaries ===
Van Brunt Creek has one named tributary, which is known as Langan Creek, which joins Van Brunt Creek in Moscow. It also has a number of unnamed tributaries.

== Hydrology ==
Upstream of Langan Creek, the peak annual discharge of Van Brunt Creek has a 10 percent chance of reaching 428 cubic feet per second. It has a 2 percent chance of reaching 731 cubic feet per second and a 1 percent chance of reaching 884 cubic feet per second. The peak annual discharge has a 0.2 percent chance of reaching 1307 cubic feet per second.

Approximately 45 feet (14 m) upstream of Cross Section Letter K, the peak annual discharge of Van Brunt Creek has a 10 percent chance of reaching 379 cubic feet per second. It has a 2 percent chance of reaching 647 cubic feet per second and a 1 percent chance of reaching 784 cubic feet per second. The peak annual discharge has a 0.2 percent chance of reaching 1160 cubic feet per second.

The North Pocono Public Library in Moscow once applied for a permit to discharge stormwater into Van Brunt Creek for construction purposes.

== Geography and geology ==
The elevation near the mouth of Van Brunt Creek is 1,476 feet (450 m) above sea level. The elevation of the creek's source is between 1,720 and 1,740 feet (520 and 530 m) above sea level.

A soil known as the Wellsboro extremely stony loam occurs in the vicinity of Van Brunt Creek. The surficial geology in the creek's vicinity mainly consists of a glacial or resedimented till known as Wisconsinan Till. However, alluvium is present along the creek in its middle and upper reaches and there are some patches of Wisconsinan Ice-Contact Drift in the watershed, as well as a few patches of bedrock consisting of conglomeratic sandstone, sandstone, and shale. There are also wetlands in the creek's headwaters and two patches of fill near the creek.

== Watershed and biology ==
Van Brunt Creek is entirely within the United States Geological Survey quadrangle of Moscow. Upstream of the tributary Langan Creek, its watershed has an area of 3.19 square miles (8.3 km^{2}). The creek is a High-Quality Coldwater Fishery and a Migratory Fishery.

Van Brunt Creek is one of the main sources of flooding in Moscow, as its tributary Langan Creek.

== History ==
Van Brunt Creek was entered into the Geographic Names Information System on August 2, 1979. Its identifier in the Geographic Names Information System is 1200124.

A concrete arch bridge carrying Pennsylvania Route 435 was built over Van Brunt Creek in 1940. It is 23.0 feet (7.0 m) long and is situated in Moscow. A steel stringer/multi-beam or girder bridge was built over the creek in Moscow in the same year. This bridge is 21.0 feet (6.4 m) long and carries Pennsylvania Route 690. The latter bridge has been given a weight limit of 28 tons, or 38 tons for combination loads.

One case of typhoid was observed in the vicinity of Van Brunt Creek in the early 1910s.

== See also ==
- Kellum Creek, next tributary of Roaring Brook going downstream
- Bear Brook (Roaring Brook), next tributary of Roaring Brook going upstream
- List of rivers of Pennsylvania
- List of tributaries of the Lackawanna River
