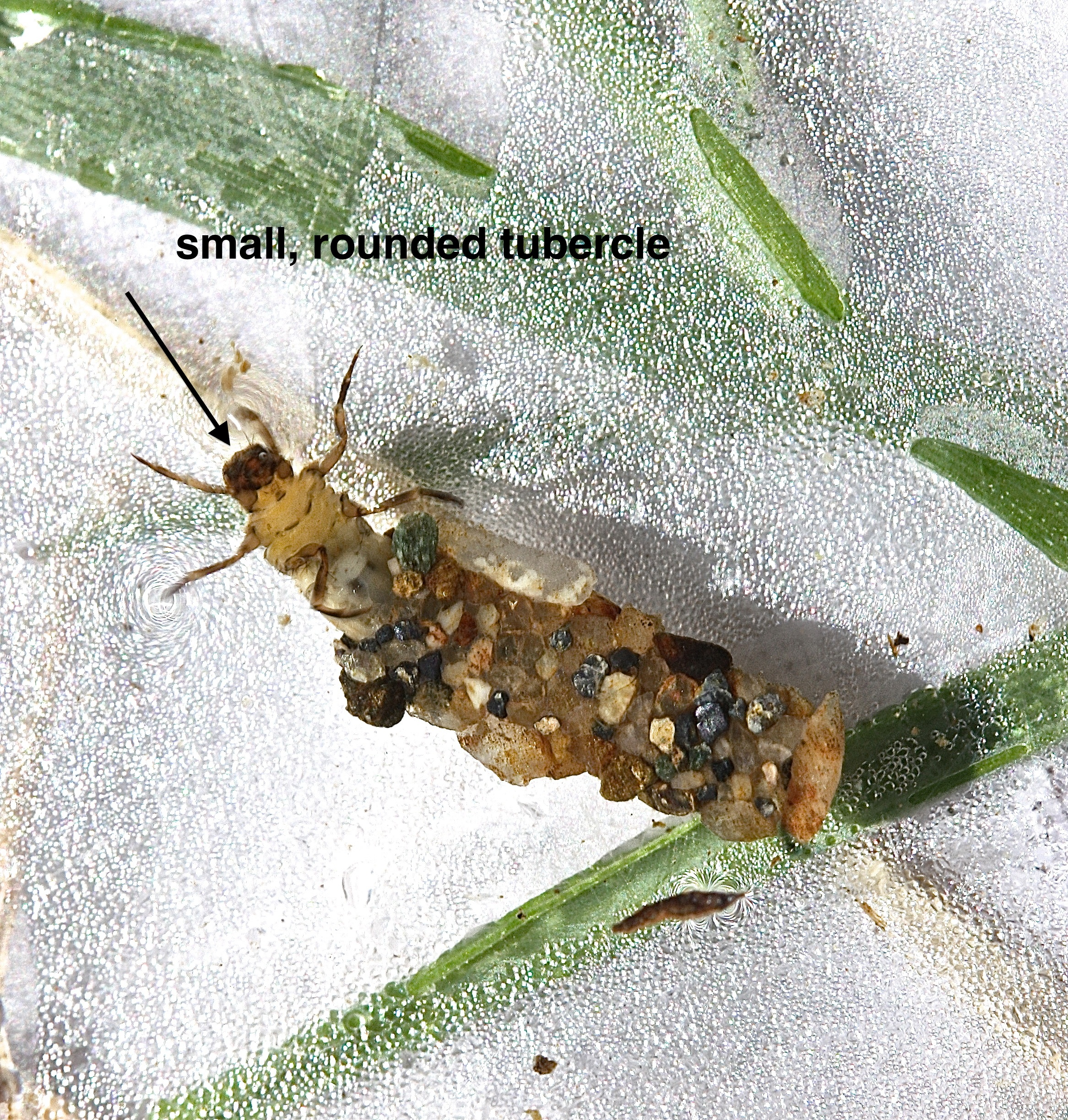

Scientific classification
- Kingdom: Animalia
- Phylum: Arthropoda
- Class: Insecta
- Order: Trichoptera
- Family: Thremmatidae
- Genus: Neophylax
- Species: N. concinnus

Binomial name
- Neophylax concinnus McLachlan, 1871

Synonyms
- Neophylax autumnus Vorhies, 1909

= Neophylax concinnus =

Species of caddisfly

Neophylax concinnus is a species of caddisfly in the family Thremmatidae. It is found in North America.
