= Uenoa =

Scientific classification
- Kingdom: Animalia
- Phylum: Arthropoda
- Clade: Pancrustacea
- Class: Insecta
- Order: Trichoptera
- Family: Uenoidae
- Subfamily: Uenoinae
- Genus: Uenoa; Iwata, 1927

Genus of caddisflies

Uenoa is a genus of stonecase caddisflies in the family Uenoidae. There are about 12 described species in Uenoa, found in Asia.

== Species ==
These 12 species belong to the genus Uenoa:

- Uenoa arcuata Wiggins, Weaver & Unzicker, 1985
- Uenoa burmana (Mosely, 1939)
- Uenoa fernandoschmidi Botosaneanu, 1979
- Uenoa hiberna Kimmins, 1964
- Uenoa hindustana (Martynov, 1936)
- Uenoa janetscheki Botosaneanu, 1976
- Uenoa laga (Mosely, 1939)
- Uenoa lobata (Hwang, 1957)
- Uenoa parva (Mosely, 1939)
- Uenoa punja (Mosely, 1939)
- Uenoa taiwanensis Hsu & Chen, 1997
- Uenoa tokunagai Iwata, 1927
