= Neophylax kolodskii =

Scientific classification
- Kingdom: Animalia
- Phylum: Arthropoda
- Clade: Pancrustacea
- Class: Insecta
- Order: Trichoptera
- Family: Thremmatidae
- Genus: Neophylax
- Species: N. kolodskii

Binomial name
- Neophylax kolodskii Parker, 2000

Species of caddisfly

Neophylax kolodskii, or Kolodski's caddisfly, is a species of caddisfly in the family Thremmatidae. It is found in North America.
