= Kellum Creek =

River in the United States of America

Physical characteristics
- Source
  - location: valley in Madison Township, Lackawanna County, Pennsylvania
  - elevation: between 1,660 and 1,680 feet (510 and 510 m)
- Mouth
  - location: Roaring Brook at the Elmhurst Reservoir in Madison Township, Lackawanna County, Pennsylvania
  - coordinates: 41°21′26″N 75°31′26″W
  - elevation: 1,424 ft (434 m)
- Length: 2.9 mi (4.7 km)
- Basin size: 2.56 sq mi (6.6 km^{2})

Basin features
- Progression: Roaring Brook → Lackawanna River → Susquehanna River → Chesapeake Bay

Kellum Creek is a tributary of Roaring Brook in Lackawanna County, Pennsylvania, in the United States. It is approximately 2.9 miles (4.7 km) long and flows through Madison Township. The watershed of the creek has an area of 2.56 square miles (6.6 km^{2}). The creek is considered to be Class A Wild Trout Waters. A planned trail is in its vicinity. The surficial geology in the area consists of alluvium, bedrock, peat bogs, wetlands, Boulder Colluvium, and Wisconsinan Till.

== Course ==
Kellum Creek begins in a broad and shallow valley in Madison Township. It flows south for several tenths of a mile before turning west and then south again. After a few tenths of a mile, the creek reaches the community of Aberdeen and turns west for more than a mile, flowing through a much narrower valley. It then turns northwest for a short distance before reaching its confluence with Roaring Brook at the southern tip of the Elmhurst Reservoir.

Kellum Creek joins Roaring Brook 12.80 miles (20.60 km) upstream of its mouth.

== Hydrology, geography, and geology ==
The elevation near the mouth of Kellum Creek is 1,424 feet (434 m) above sea level. The elevation of the creek's source is between 1,660 and 1,680 feet (510 and 510 m) above sea level.

The surficial geology along the valley floor of Kellum Creek in its lower reaches mainly consists of Boulder Colluvium (which contains numerous quartz, sandstone, or conglomerate boulders) and alluvium. Bedrock containing conglomeratic sandstone, sandstone, and shale occurs on the sides of the valley and a glacial or resedimented till known as Wisconsinan Till also occurs in the area. Further upstream, the surficial geology in the creek's vicinity consists mainly of Wisconsinan Till, with some patches of bedrock, Boulder Colluvium, peat bogs, and wetlands.

The concentration of alkalinity in Kellum Creek is 20 milligrams per liter.

== Watershed ==
The watershed of Kellum Creek has an area of 2.56 square miles (6.6 km^{2}). The mouth of the creek is in the United States Geological Survey quadrangle of Moscow. However, its source is in the quadrangle of Sterling.

== History and recreation ==
Kellum Creek was entered into the Geographic Names Information System on August 2, 1979. Its identifier in the Geographic Names Information System is 1178331.

In the early 2000s, the Lackawanna River Watershed Conservation Plan recommended that Madison Township include protection of Kellum Creek in their zoning plans. A bridge carries State Route 2004/Reservoir Road over the creek. Its replacement has been proposed. Land along the creek was historically owned by the Theta Land Corporation. However, they opened the creek and many others in the area to the public in 2002 by leasing the surrounding land to the Pennsylvania Fish and Boat Commission for $1 per year.

A trail crossing Kellum Creek on its path from Pennsylvania American Water lands in Roaring Brook Township to a location near the sewer plant in Mosvow in the North Pocono region has been planned. The trail will be known as the Roaring Creek Trail and will be 3 miles (4.8 km) long. Construction was slated for 2014 and part of the funding was supplied by the Pennsylvania Environmental Council. The crossing of Kellum Creek is planned to be as natural as possible and contain no bridges, only a rock crossing.

== Biology ==
Wild trout naturally reproduce in Kellum Creek from its upper reaches downstream to its mouth. The creek is also considered by the Pennsylvania Fish and Boat Commission to be Class A Wild Trout Waters for brook trout.

== See also ==
- White Oak Run (Roaring Brook), next tributary of Roaring Brook going downstream
- Van Brunt Creek, next tributary of Roaring Brook going upstream
- List of rivers of Pennsylvania
- List of tributaries of the Lackawanna River
