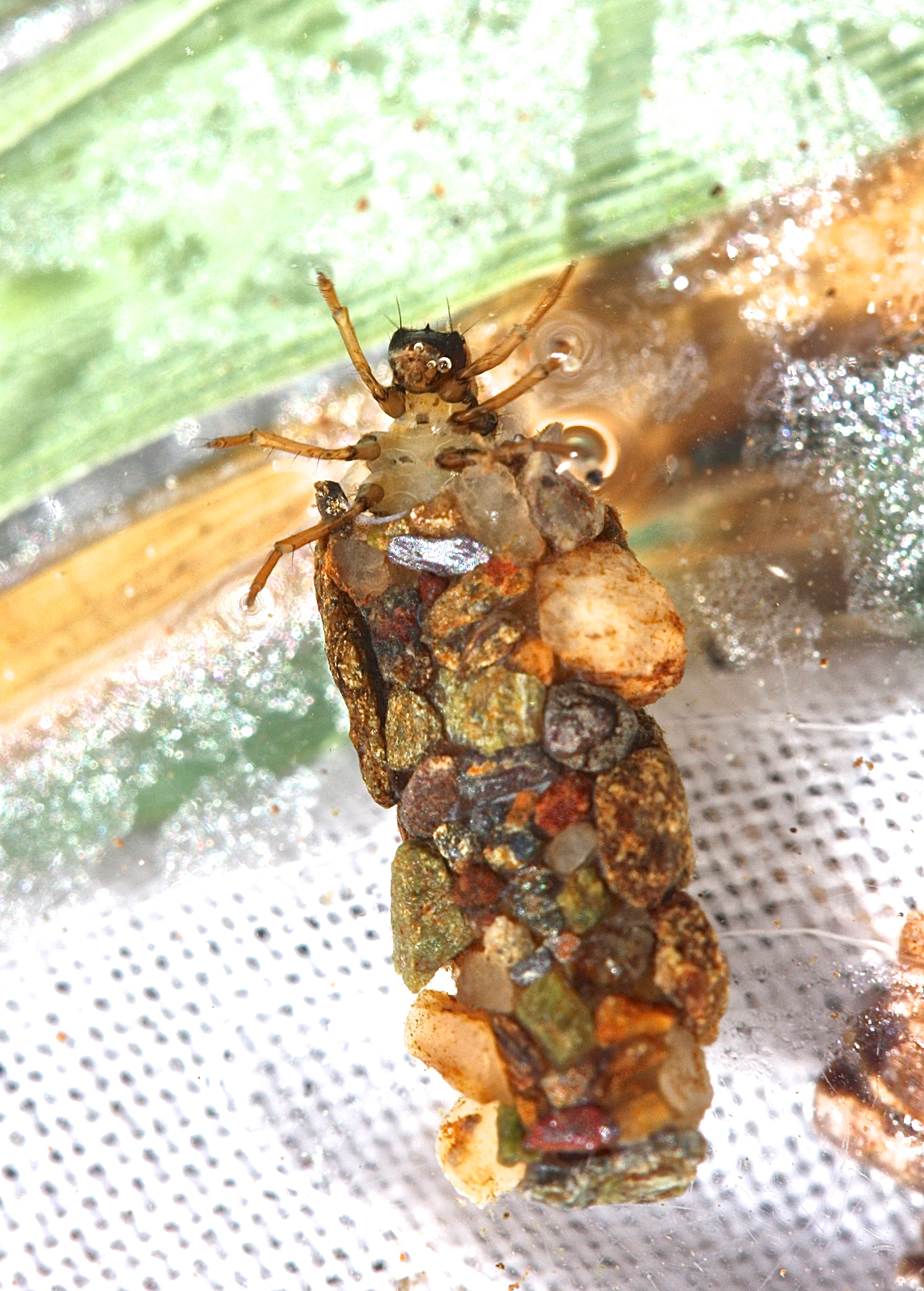

Scientific classification
- Kingdom: Animalia
- Phylum: Arthropoda
- Clade: Pancrustacea
- Class: Insecta
- Order: Trichoptera
- Family: Thremmatidae
- Genus: Neophylax
- Species: N. mitchelli

Binomial name
- Neophylax mitchelli Carpenter, 1933

= Neophylax mitchelli =

Species of caddisfly

Neophylax mitchelli is a species of caddisfly in the family Thremmatidae. It is found in North America.
