= Mountain Lake Run =

Physical characteristics
- Source
  - location: near Mountain Lake in Scranton, Lackawanna County, Pennsylvania
- Mouth
  - location: Stafford Meadow Brook in Scranton, Lackawanna County, Pennsylvania
  - coordinates: 41°23′24″N 75°39′50″W
  - elevation: 801 ft (244 m)
- Length: more than 0.8 miles (1.3 km)
- Basin size: 2 sq mi (5.2 km^{2})

Basin features
- Progression: Stafford Meadow Brook → Lackawanna River → Susquehanna River → Chesapeake Bay

Mountain Lake Run is a tributary of Stafford Meadow Brook in Lackawanna County, Pennsylvania, in the United States. It is more than 0.8 miles (1.3 km) (Note: The National Map indicates that the stream is about 0.8 miles (1.3 km) long, but the city of Scranton's Stormwater Management System Review states that it begins at Mountain Lake, considerably more than 0.8 miles (1.3 km) from the stream's mouth.) long and flows through Scranton. The watershed of the stream has an area of approximately 2 square miles (5.2 km^{2}). A dammed lake known as Mountain Lake is in the watershed. The stream flows through an underground culvert system in its lower reaches, but its upper reaches are forested and relatively unimpacted.

== Course ==
Mountain Lake Run begins near Mountain Lake in Scranton. It flows downhill to the Mattes Community Center and eventually enters a culvert near river mile 1 and remains in a culvert system for much of the remainder of its length. On the other side of Interstate 81, it turns southwest for several tenths of a mile and crosses a number of streets before turning northwest. A short distance further downstream, it reaches its confluence with Stafford Meadow Brook.

== Geography and geology ==
The elevation near the mouth of Mountain Lake Run is 801 feet (244 m) above sea level.

Where Mountain Lake has a natural channel, it is 2 to 3 feet (0.61 to 0.91 m) wide. In these reaches, its streambank is shallow, with a depth of approximately 2 feet (0.61 m). There are also numerous rock ledges and splash pools. A total of 30 percent of the stream is on impervious surfaces.

There are stone walls from the time of the Works Progress Administration at one point in the watershed of Mountain Lake Run. It also flows through a culvert system for a substantial part of its length in its lower reaches, beginning below Wintermantle Avenue. The culvert system also crosses Interstate 81 and Moltke Avenue.

== Watershed ==
The watershed of Mountain Lake Run has an area of approximately 2 square miles (5.2 km^{2}). It is a first-order stream. Mountain Lake Run is entirely within the United States Geological Survey quadrangle of Scranton.

The watershed of Mountain Lake Run contains low-density residential land, open spaces, and some forested land. Most of the watershed contains native mixed hardwood trees, but there is some impact from coal mining in its upper reaches. The upper reaches of the watershed are undeveloped. However, neighborhoods in the watershed include Mountain Lake Estates, Robinson Park, and Bolus subdivision.

A pond known as Mountain Lake is in the upper reaches of the watershed of Mountain Lake Run. It has an area of 2 acres (0.81 ha) and is fed by springs. It also received an impoundment berm from the East Mountain Coal Company in the late 19th century.

== History ==
Mountain Lake Run was entered into the Geographic Names Information System on January 1, 1990. Its identifier in the Geographic Names Information System is 1202408. It was added because it appeared on Patton's Philadelphia and Suburbs Street and Road Map, which was published in 1984.

The old corridor of the Erie and Wyoming Valley Railroad is in the watershed of Maple Lake Run. Around 1938, the Works Progress Administration created stone walls and culverts on the stream near the Mattes Community Center.

The daylighting of Mountain Lake Run was proposed in 2013. A report suggested doing it while widening Interstate 81 but noted that it might not be cost-effective.

== Biology ==
The riparian area of Mountain Lake Run contains native plants such as red oak, witch hazel, and mountain laurel. There are also small patches of meadow land with native grasses and herbaceous plants such as little bluestem.

== See also ==
- List of rivers of Pennsylvania
- List of tributaries of the Lackawanna River
