= Lake Run =

Physical characteristics
- Source
  - location: Henry Lake in Covington Township, Lackawanna County, Pennsylvania
  - elevation: approximately 1,900 feet (580 m)
- Mouth
  - location: Roaring Brook in Covington Township, Lackawanna County, Pennsylvania
  - coordinates: 41°18′15″N 75°29′17″W
  - elevation: 1,654 ft (504 m)
- Length: 1.6 mi (2.6 km)
- Basin size: 3.44 sq mi (8.9 km^{2})

Basin features
- Progression: Roaring Brook → Lackawanna River → Susquehanna River → Chesapeake Bay
- Tributaries
  - left: Emerson Run

Lake Run is a tributary of Roaring Brook in Lackawanna County, Pennsylvania, in the United States. It is approximately 1.6 miles (2.6 km) long and flows through Covington Township. The watershed of the stream has an area of 3.44 square miles (8.9 km^{2}). It has one named tributary, which is known as Emerson Run. Lake Run is considered to be Class A Wild Trout Waters. The surficial geology in its vicinity consists of Wisconsinan Ice-Contact Stratified Drift, Wisconsinan Till, Boulder Colluvium, alluvium, bedrock, sand and gravel pits, fill, wetlands, peat bogs, and a lake.

== Course ==
Lake Run begins in Henry Lake, in the community of Eagle Lake, in Covington Township. The stream flows west-northwest for several tenths of a mile before turning north-northwest for more than a mile, flowing in a valley on the border of Eagle Lake and receiving the tributary Emerson Run from the left. The stream eventually leaves behind the border of Eagle Lake and turns northwest for several hundred feet before reaching its confluence with Roaring Brook.

Lake Run joins Roaring Brook 17.50 miles (28.16 km) upstream of its mouth.

=== Tributaries ===
Lake Run has one named tributary, which is known as Emerson Run. Emerson Run joins Lake Run 0.84 miles (1.35 km) upstream of its mouth. Its watershed has an area of 1.58 square miles (4.1 km^{2}).

== Hydrology ==
The concentration of alkalinity in Lake Run is 15 milligrams per liter. Rainwater from the Covington Industrial Park has been discharged into the stream.

== Geography and geology ==
The elevation near the mouth of Lake Run is 1,654 feet (504 m) above sea level. The elevation of the stream's source is approximately 1,900 feet (580 m) above sea level.

The surficial geology in the vicinity of the lower reaches of Lake Run consists of bedrock consisting of conglomeratic sandstone, sandstone, and shale; Wisconsinan Ice-Contact Stratified Drift; Wisconsinan Till, a glacial till; alluvium, fill; and sand and gravel pits. Further upstream, there is Boulder Colluvium, which contains numerous conglomerate, quartz, and sandstone boulders; Wisconsinan Till, bedrock, wetlands, peat bogs, and a lake.

== Watershed ==
The watershed of Lake Run has an area of 3.44 square miles (8.9 km^{2}). The stream is entirely within the United States Geological Survey quadrangle of Sterling. The lower 1.1 miles (1.8 km) of the stream is on private land that is closed to access.

A lake known as Henry Lake is in the watershed of Lake Run. It has an area of 68 acres (28 ha) and is dammed by the Lake Henry Dam. In the late 1970s, the dam was found to be in good condition, but its spillway was inadequate.

== History ==
Lake Run was entered into the Geographic Names Information System on August 2, 1979. Its identifier in the Geographic Names Information System is 1178786.

A proposed utility line crosses wetlands in the vicinity of Lake Run.

== Biology ==
Wild trout naturally reproduce within a reach of Lake Run. A reach of the stream is considered by the Pennsylvania Fish and Boat Commission to be Class A Wild Trout Waters for both brook trout and brown trout. The stream is also a High-Quality Coldwater Fishery.

== See also ==
- East Branch Roaring Brook, next tributary of Roaring Brook going downstream
- List of rivers of Pennsylvania
- List of tributaries of the Lackawanna River
