= Lake Scranton =

Reservoir in Pennsylvania, U.S.

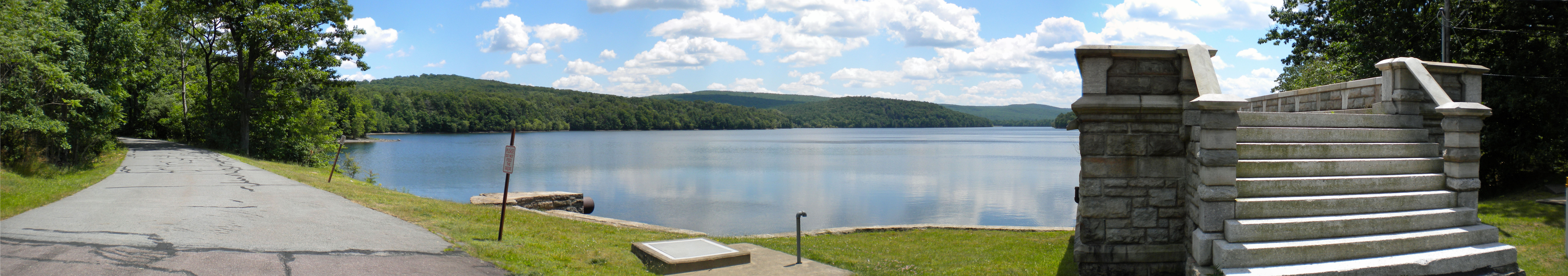

- Location within Pennsylvania Location within the United States
- Location: Lackawanna County, Pennsylvania, U.S.
- Coordinates: 41°23′N 75°38′W
- Type: Reservoir
- Primary inflows: Stafford Meadow Brook
- Basin countries: United States
- Surface area: 213 acres (86 ha)
- Surface elevation: 1,280 ft (390 m)

Lake Scranton is an American reservoir that is located in Lackawanna County, Pennsylvania, It has a 3.5-mile (5.6 km) running track which surrounds it.

It is owned by the Pennsylvania American Water Company, which supplies the city of Scranton, Pennsylvania with drinking water.

== History and features ==
This reservoir, which was formed by a dam built by William Walker Scranton in 1898, was called the "Burned Bridge Reservoir." More commonly referred to by local residents as "Lake Scranton," it borders East Mountain in Scranton, Pennsylvania.

=== In popular culture ===
Lake Scranton is mentioned in two episodes of The Office: "Beach Games" and "Dunder Mifflin Infinity", where Michael Scott drives his rental Ford Taurus into it. The "Beach Games" episode was shot at a fake beach near Hansen Dam, California.
