= Little Roaring Brook =

Physical characteristics
- Source
  - location: Marshwood Reservoir in Olyphant, Lackawanna County, Pennsylvania
  - elevation: between 1,520 and 1,540 feet (460 and 470 m)
- Mouth
  - location: Roaring Brook in Dunmore, Lackawanna County, Pennsylvania
  - coordinates: 41°24′52″N 75°36′35″W
  - elevation: 1,010 ft (310 m)
- Length: 3.4 mi (5.5 km)
- Basin size: 3.06 sq mi (7.9 km^{2})

Basin features
- Progression: Roaring Brook → Lackawanna River → Susquehanna River → Chesapeake Bay

Little Roaring Brook is a tributary of Roaring Brook in Lackawanna County, Pennsylvania, in the United States. It is approximately 3.4 miles (5.5 km) long and flows through Olyphant, Throop, and Dunmore. The watershed of the stream has an area of 3.06 square miles (7.9 km^{2}). It contains several watersheds: Dunmore Reservoir Number One, Marshwood Reservoir, and Dunmore Reservoir Number Three. Some strip mining has been done in the stream's vicinity and it has a high load of sediment. The surficial geology in the stream's vicinity consists of Wisconsinan Till, surface mining land, bedrock, urban land, and wetlands.

== Course ==
Little Roaring Brook begins at the Marshwood Reservoir in Olyphant. It flows west-southwest for several tenths of a mile, entering Throop and flowing into a valley. It then turns south before turning south-southwest and entering Dunmore. It then turns west-southwest for nearly a mile before entering Dunmore Reservoir Number One. From the southwestern edge of the reservoir, it flows west-northwest for several tenths of a mile, crossing Interstate 380. The stream then turns southeast and flows down a steep slope to its confluence with Roaring Brook.

Little Roaring Brook joins Roaring Brook 4.70 miles (7.56 km) upstream of its mouth.

=== Tributaries ===
Little Roaring Brook has no named tributaries. However, it does have three unnamed tributaries.

== Hydrology ==
Little Roaring Brook has a high load of sediment. There is also trash and debris along it in some reaches.

The peak annual discharge of Little Roaring Brook has a 10 percent chance of reaching 750 cubic feet per second. It has a 2 percent chance of reaching 1720 cubic feet per second and 1 percent chance of reaching 2350 cubic feet per second. The peak annual discharge has a 0.2 percent chance of reaching 5150 cubic feet per second.

== Geography and geology ==
The elevation near the mouth of Little Roaring Brook is 1,010 feet (310 m) above sea level. The elevation near the stream's source is between 1,520 and 1,540 feet (460 and 470 m) above sea level.

There is a waterfall known as Little Roaring Brook Falls in the watershed of Little Roaring Brook in Dunmore. The channel of the stream is an open concrete channel in some reaches. In other places, it has a natural shallow bank.

The highly stony Norwich and Chippewa silt and loams are found along Little Roaring Brook. They occur there on 0 to 8 percent slopes. The surficial geology in the vicinity of the stream's lower reaches mainly includes urban land heavily disrupted by cut and fill, a glacial or resedimented till known as Wisconsinan Till, and bedrock consisting of sandstone, conglomeratic sandstone, and shale. Further upstream, there is no urban land, but the surficial geology still includes bedrock, as well as surface mining land. Near the headwaters, there is Wisconsinan Till, surface mining land, and a patch of wetland.

Little Roaring Brook flows through eight pipes whose diameters range from 6 to 24 inches (15 to 61 cm).

== Watershed and biology ==
The watershed of Little Roaring Brook has an area of 3.06 square miles (7.9 km^{2}). The watershed is mostly in Dunmore and Throop, but small areas are in Olyphant and Roaring Brook Township. The stream is entirely within the United States Geological Survey quadrangle of Olyphant.

There are two reservoirs on Little Roaring Brook: the 24-acre Dunmore Reservoir Number One and the 40-acre Marshwood Reservoir. Additionally, the 9-acre Dunmore Reservoir Number Three is situated on an unnamed tributary of the stream. In the late 1970s, the Dunmore Number Three Dam was judged to be in fair condition. The Dunmore Number One Dam was judged to be in good condition around that time.

The riparian area along Little Roaring Brook is forested. Major roads in the watershed include Interstate 84, Interstate 380, and US Route 6. Marshwood Road is situated to the north of the stream. There are several homes along this part of the road, but none are historic. Land uses in the watershed include neighborhood commercial. A 1908 report described the watershed as being sparsely populated with rugged terrain. There is a strip mined area along the stream in Throop. In the same borough, the stream is near a site with secondary woods in a disturbed area.

== History ==
Little Roaring Brook was entered into the Geographic Names Information System on August 2, 1979. Its identifier in the Geographic Names Information System is 1199058. The stream is also known as Little Roaring Creek. This name appears on Patton's Philadelphia and Suburbs Street and Road Map, which was published in 1984.

A site along Little Roaring Brook has prehistoric archaeological significance.

At least one of the reservoirs on Little Roaring Brook was planned as early as 1908. The purpose of this reservoir was to complete the Dunmore system. A reservoir on Little Roaring Brook was owned by the Dunmore Water Company in the early 1900s. The Pennsylvania Coal Company historically had land along the stream.

A concrete culvert bridge carrying Interstate 84 over Little Roaring Brook was built in 1961 and repaired in 1996. It is 21.0 feet (6.4 m) and is located in Dunmore.

A waste management system and flood control project on Little Roaring Brook and Roaring Brook was authorized in 1996 for a cost of $1,150,000. In the early 2000s, the Lackawanna River Watershed Conservation Plan recommended that the borough of Dunmore include protection of Little Roaring Brook in their zoning plans. A greenway along the stream has been proposed.

== See also ==
- Rock Bottom Creek, next tributary of Roaring Brook going upstream
- List of rivers of Pennsylvania
- List of tributaries of the Lackawanna River
