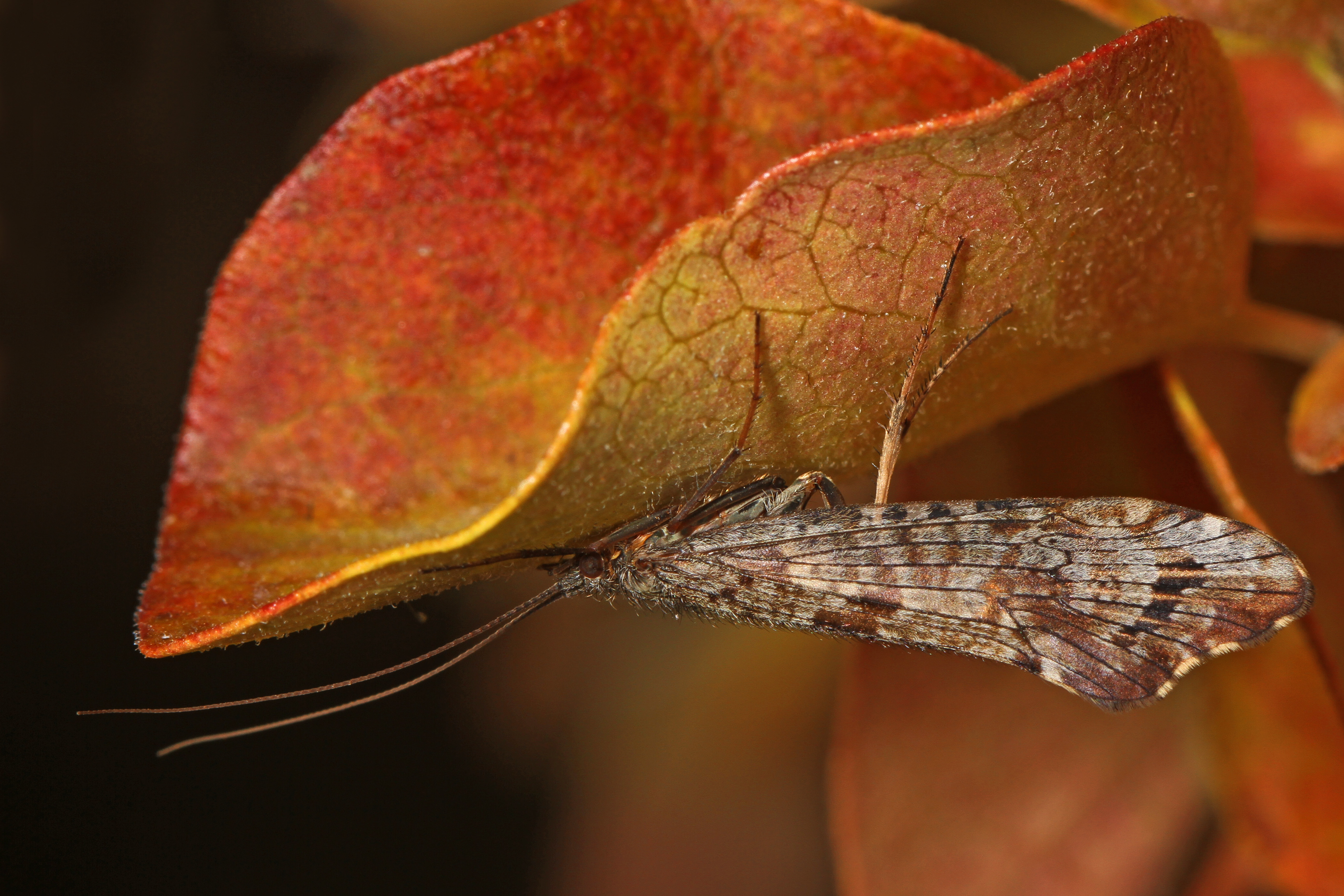
- Neophylax splendens

Scientific classification
- Kingdom: Animalia
- Phylum: Arthropoda
- Clade: Pancrustacea
- Class: Insecta
- Order: Trichoptera
- Family: Thremmatidae
- Genus: Neophylax; McLachlan, 1871

Synonyms
- Acronopsyche Banks, 1930

= Neophylax =

Genus of caddisflies

Neophylax is a genus of autumn mottled sedges in the family Uenoidae. There are more than 30 described species in Neophylax.

== Species ==
These 37 species belong to the genus Neophylax:

- Neophylax acutus Vineyard & Wiggins, 1987
- Neophylax albipunctatus (Martynov, 1930)
- Neophylax aniqua Ross, 1947
- Neophylax atlanta Ross, 1947
- Neophylax auris Vineyard & Wiggins, 1987
- Neophylax ayanus Ross, 1938
- Neophylax concinnus McLachlan, 1871
- Neophylax consimilis Betten, 1934
- Neophylax delicatus Banks, 1943
- Neophylax etnieri Vineyard & Wiggins, 1987
- Neophylax fenestratus (Banks, 1940)
- Neophylax fuscus Banks, 1903
- Neophylax japonicus Schmid, 1964
- Neophylax kolodskii Parker, 2000 (Kolodski's caddisfly)
- Neophylax lewisae Etnier
- Neophylax maculatus (Forsslund, 1935)
- Neophylax mitchelli Carpenter, 1933
- Neophylax muinensis Kobayashi, 1977
- Neophylax nacatus Denning, 1941
- Neophylax nigripunctatus Tian & Li Tian, Li, Yang & Sun, in Chen, editor, 1993
- Neophylax occidentis Banks, 1924
- Neophylax oligius Ross, 1938 (autumn sedge)
- Neophylax ornatus Banks, 1920
- Neophylax ottawa Vineyard & Wiggins, 1987
- Neophylax relictus (Martynov, 1935)
- Neophylax rickeri Milne, 1935
- Neophylax securis Vineyard & Wiggins, 1987
- Neophylax sinuatus Navas, 1917
- Neophylax slossonae Banks, 1943
- Neophylax smithi Vineyard & Wiggins, 1987
- Neophylax splendens Denning, 1948
- Neophylax stolus Ross, 1938
- Neophylax tenuicornis (Ulmer, 1907)
- Neophylax toshioi Vineyard & Wiggins, 1987
- Neophylax ussuriensis (Martynov, 1914)
- Neophylax virginica Flint & Kjer
- Neophylax wigginsi Sykora & Weaver, 1978
