= Montage Mountain Ski Resort =

Ski area in Pennsylvania, United States

Montage Mountain
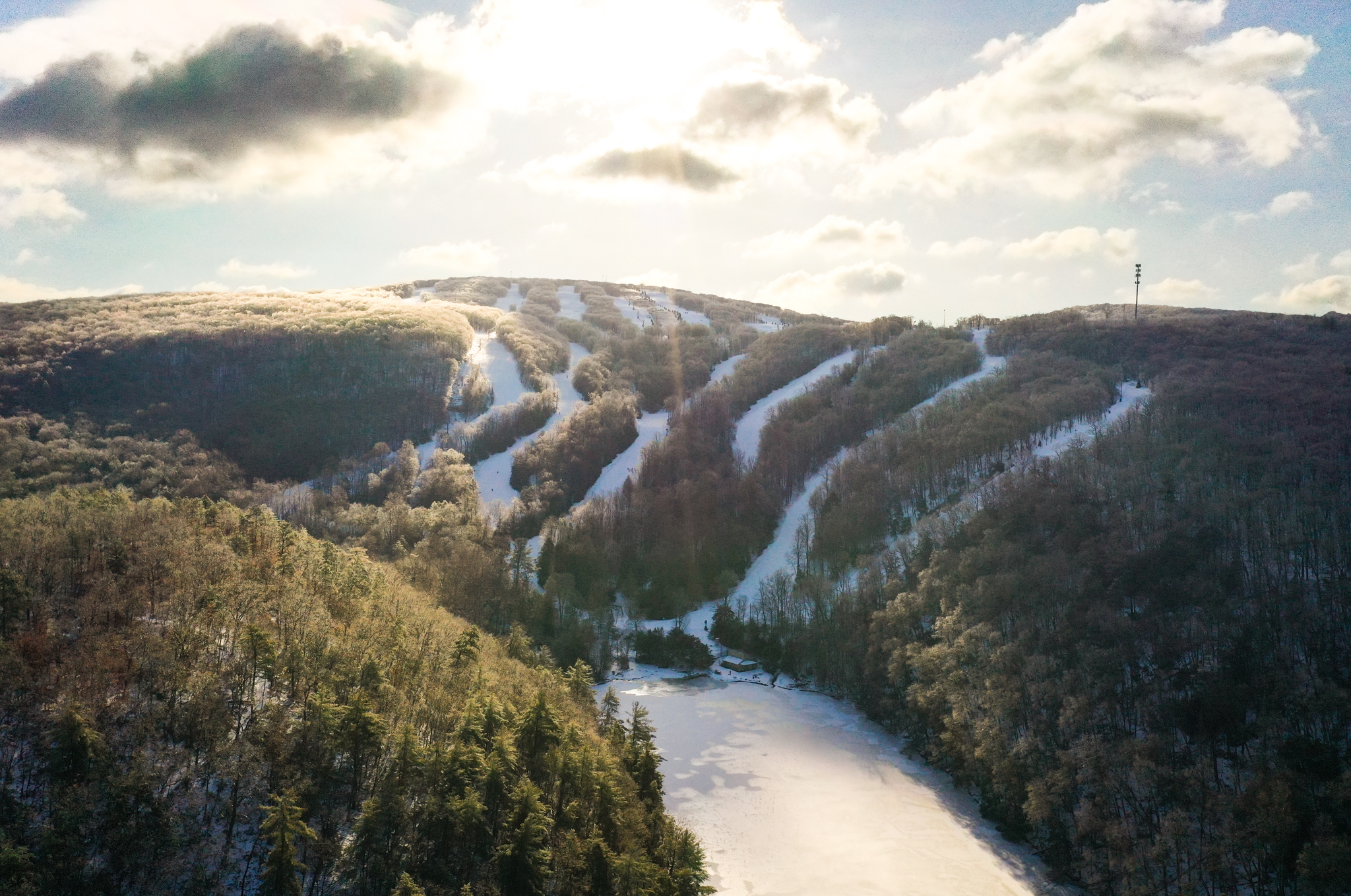
- Aerial View of Montage Mountain in Scranton, Pennsylvania
- Interactive map of Montage Mountain
- Location: Scranton, Pennsylvania, United States
- Coordinates: 41.3533°N 75.6592°W
- Vertical: 1,000 ft (300 m)
- Top elevation: 1,960 ft (600 m)
- Base elevation: 960 ft (290 m)
- Skiable area: 140 acres (0.57 km^{2})
- Trails: 26: 19% - beginner; 46% - intermediate; 19% - advanced; 15% - expert
- Longest run: 1.183 mi (1.904 km)
- Lift system: 7 chairlifts 2 surface lifts
- Lift capacity: 8,000/hr
- Terrain parks: 2
- Snowfall: 60 in (1.5 m)
- Snowmaking: 100%
- Night skiing: 100%
- Website: www.montagemountainresorts.com

Montage Mountain is a ski area in Pennsylvania that is located 8 miles (13 km) from downtown Scranton, Pennsylvania. Situated roughly 125 miles (201 km) north of Philadelphia and west of New York City, this resort has twenty-six trails including two terrain parks. The mountain has a summit elevation of 1,960 feet (600 m) and a vertical drop of 1,000 feet (300 m).

== History ==
=== Ownership ===
From 1984 to 1991, Montage Mountain was owned and run by Montage, Inc., a non-profit corporation. The ski area was developed with a blend of public and private money. Public funding was provided by federal economic development funds and a county bond.

In 1979, the land was purchased from Pennsylvania Gas & Water Co. for $14 million (equivalent to $62 million in 2025). Construction began in January 1984 and was completed in time for the grand opening in December.

Lackawanna County purchased the ski resort in 1991 for $14.7 million (equivalent to $34.7 million in 2025).

In 2006, Lackawanna County sold the ski area to Sno Mountain, LP, a Philadelphia-based investment group, for $5.1 million. The ski area was renamed Snö Mountain. Sno Mountain, LP filed a Chapter 11 petition for bankruptcy in 2012, claiming upwards of $24 million in debt.

National Penn Bank purchased the property at auction for $4.6 million in March 2013. The original name, Montage Mountain, was restored in May 2013 when the area was sold to real estate company Jefferson-Werner for $5.1 million.

=== Terrain ===
Montage opened to the public in 1984 with seven trails and three fixed-grip triple chairlifts. An experts-only North Face complex was opened in 1987. North Face featured one black diamond trail (Cannonball) and two double-black diamond trails (Smoke and Boomer). A third double-black-diamond trail, White Lightning, was added in the late 1990s. North Face is served by a fixed-grip quad chairlift.

== Skiing at Montage Mountain ==
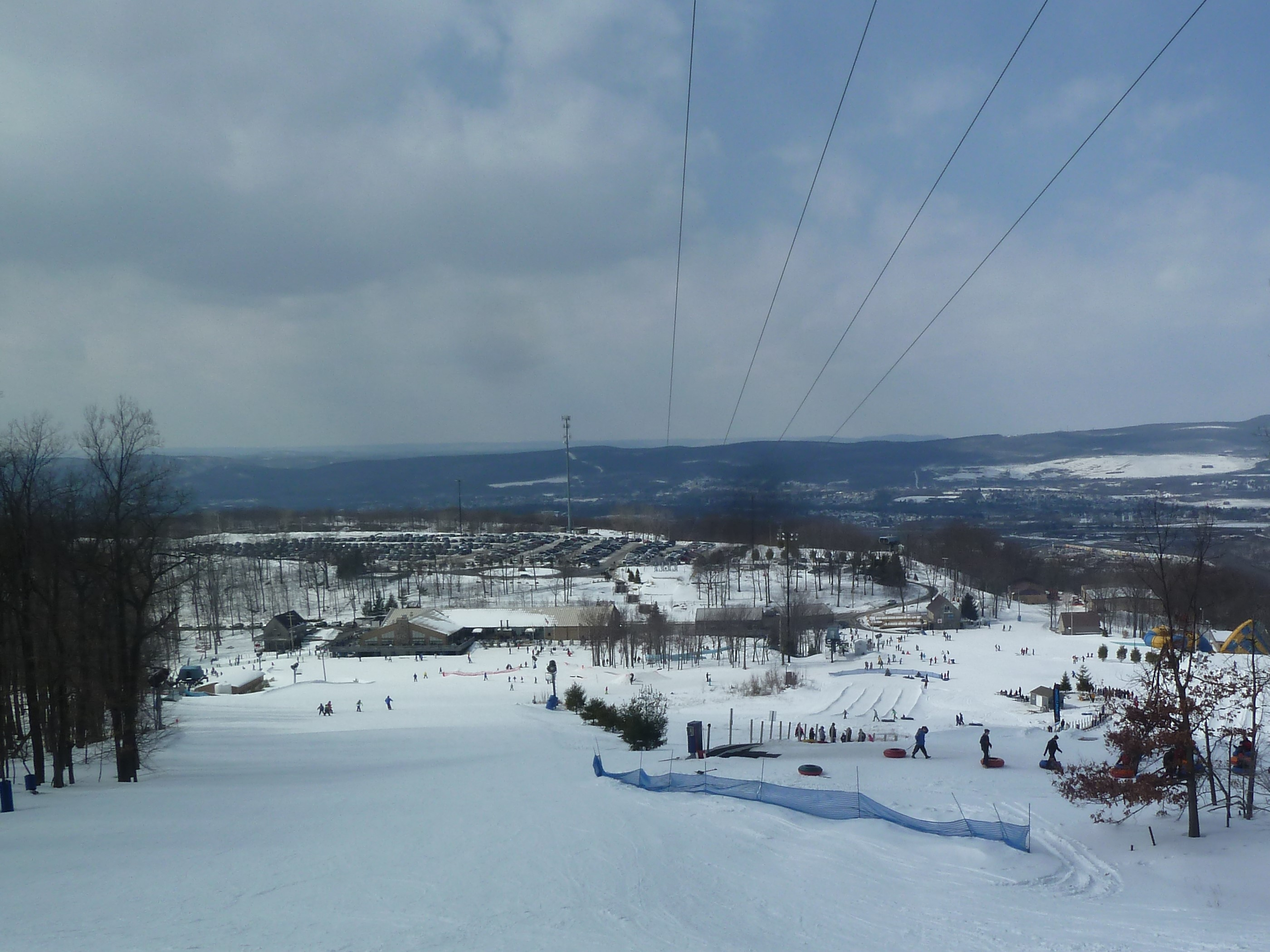
View from the mountain

Montage Mountain has twenty-seven ski and snowboard trails, including White Lightning, the second steepest trail in the Eastern United States.

It also has a mid-mountain lodge with a full-service bar and restaurant that are open to the public during open seasons. Situated above the lodge are the beginner and intermediate slopes; the advanced and expert slopes are below. This advanced area is locally known as North Face; it features the steepest skiing in Pennsylvania. Montage Mountain has two terrain parks with jumps, rails, and features ranging from beginner to expert. Montage also has a gladed ski trail.

=== Trails ===
Beginner trails (marked with a green circle) are the Learning Area, Limited (the bunny slope), Runaround, Easy Street, Highball, and Mainline. Intermediate trails (blue square) are Spike, Switch, Whistler, Upper Runaway, Upper Fast Track, Snake, Nordic, Sidewinder, and the Glades. Advanced trails (black diamond) are Lower Fast Track, Lower Runaway, Rattler, and Cannonball. Expert trails (double-black diamond) are Smoke, Boomer and White Lightning. White Lightning is the signature slope of Montage Mountain.

== Mountain Statistics ==
Montage Mountain rises from a base elevation of 960 feet (290 m) to a peak elevation of 1,960 feet (600 m). The mountain has a vertical drop of 1,000 feet (300 m), tied for third-highest in Pennsylvania.

=== Lifts ===
- 5 fixed-grip chairlifts:

- Shuttle (triple)
- Short Haul (double)
- Iron Horse (triple)
- Long Haul (triple)
- Phoebe Snow (quad)

- 2 magic carpet lifts

- One along the snow tubing tracks;
- One for beginning skiers.

=== Trails ===
The trail difficulty breakdown is:

- 35% beginner
- 30% intermediate
- 20% advanced
- 15% expert

There is also a snow tubing area.

== Summer ==
Montage Mountain Waterpark is located on ski area grounds. It features six water attractions including a lazy river, wave pool, tornado (ProSlide ride), and water slides. Dry attractions include batting cages, beach volleyball, tetherball, mini-golf, and the ZipRider, a 50 mph (80 km/h) quad cable ride.
