= Pennsylvania Gravity Railroad =

Gravity railroad in Pennsylvania

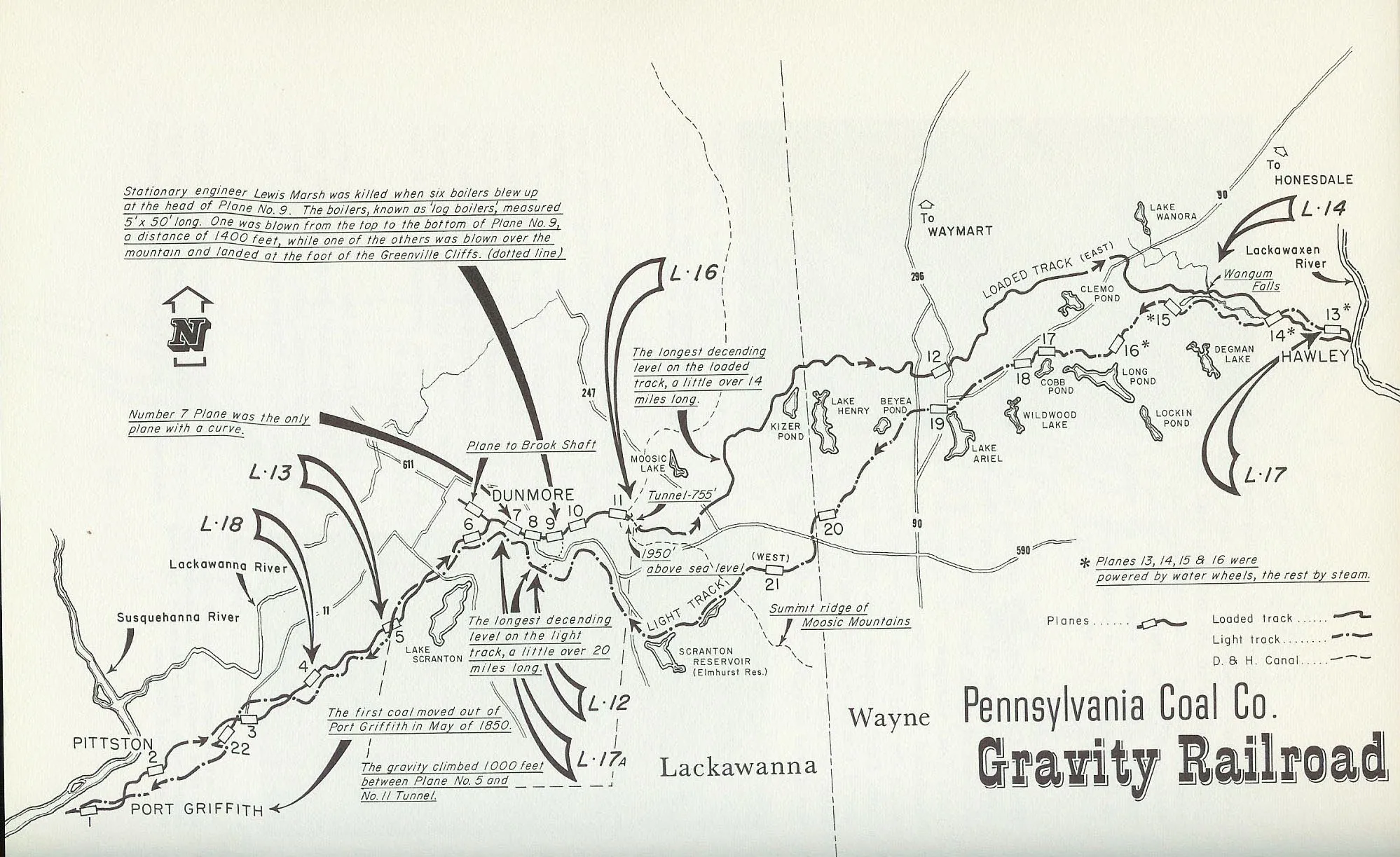

The Pennsylvania Gravity Railroad was a gravity railroad established to ship anthracite coal in Pennsylvania. It was established in 1850 and covered 47 miles to the Delaware and Hudson Canal. It was succeeded by the Erie and Wyoming Valley Railroad in 1885. A historical marker commemorates the line. Old Gravity Road and the village of Gravity were named for it.
