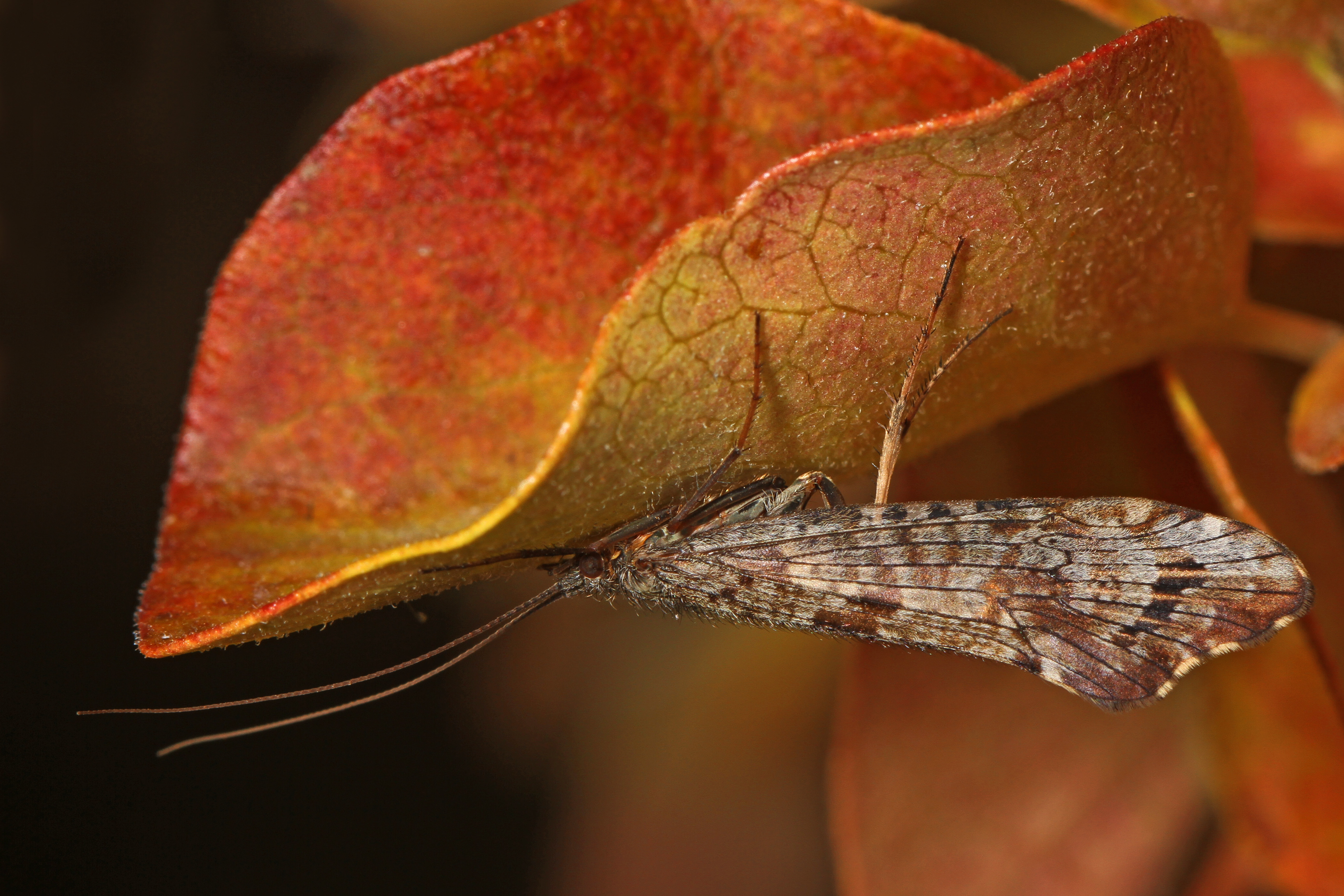
- Neophylax splendens

Scientific classification
- Kingdom: Animalia
- Phylum: Arthropoda
- Clade: Pancrustacea
- Class: Insecta
- Order: Trichoptera
- Superfamily: Limnephiloidea
- Family: Uenoidae; Iwata, 1927

= Uenoidae =

Family of caddisflies

Uenoidae is a family of stonecase caddisflies in the order Trichoptera. There are about 7 genera and at least 80 described species in Uenoidae.

== Genera ==
These seven genera belong to the family Uenoidae:

- Farula Milne, 1936
- Neophylax McLachlan, 1871
- Neothremma Dodds & Hisaw, 1925
- Oligophlebodes Ulmer, 1905
- Sericostriata Wiggins, Weaver & Unzicker, 1985
- Thremma McLachlan, 1876
- Uenoa Iwata, 1927
