= South Branch Leach Creek =

Physical characteristics
- Source
  - location: West Mountain near the border between Ransom Township, Pennsylvania and Scranton, Lackawanna County, Pennsylvania
  - elevation: between 1,780 and 1,800 feet (540 and 550 m)
- Mouth
  - location: Leach Creek in Scranton, Lackawanna County, Pennsylvania
  - coordinates: 41°27′00″N 75°40′38″W
  - elevation: 1,066 ft (325 m)
- Length: 0.8 mi (1.3 km)
- Basin size: 0.463 sq mi (1.20 km^{2})

Basin features
- Progression: Leach Creek → Leggetts Creek → Lackawanna River → Susquehanna River → Chesapeake Bay

South Branch Leach Creek is a tributary of Leach Creek in Lackawanna County, Pennsylvania, in the United States. It is approximately 0.8 miles (1.3 km) long and flows through Scranton. The watershed of the creek has an area of 0.463 square miles (1.20 km^{2}). A substantial portion of the watershed is situated within coal measures. The creek also experiences seepage into mine workings via both surface seepage and streambed seepage.

== Course ==
South Branch Leach Creek begins on the slopes of West Mountain, on or near the border between Scranton and Ransom Township. It flows down the mountain in an east-southeast direction for a short distance before crossing Interstate 476 and continuing east-southeast. For the next several tenths of a mile, it continues flowing down the mountain until it reaches its confluence with Leach Creek near Terrace Lane and Pennsylvania Route 307.

South Branch Leach Creek enters Leach Creek on the latter creek's right.

== Hydrology, geography, and geology ==
The elevation near the mouth of South Branch Leach Creek is 1,066 feet (325 m) above sea level. The elevation of the creek's source is between 1,780 and 1,800 feet (540 and 550 m) above sea level.

Coal is located within the watershed of South Branch Leach Creek. According to the mid-20th-century report Surface-Water Seepage into Anthracite Mines in the Lackawanna Basin, Northern Field: Anthracite Region of Pennsylvania, the estimated rate of surface seepage into mine workings at the creek is 4.22 US gallons (16.0 L) per minute per 1 inch (2.5 cm) of rainfall. The report estimated the rate of streambed seepage into mine workings to be 2.57 US gallons (9.7 L) per minute per 1 inch (2.5 cm) of rainfall.

== Watershed ==
The watershed of South Branch Leach Creek has an area of 0.463 square miles (1.20 km^{2}). The creek is entirely within the United States Geological Survey quadrangle of Scranton.

A total of 0.345 square miles (0.89 km^{2}) of the watershed of South Branch Leach Creek is situated within coal measures, which are common in a band running from west-central Lackawanna County to northeast Lackawanna County. A mid-20th-century report listed the creek as being part of the North 3 Watershed, along with several other creeks.

Interstate 476 crosses Leach Creek in its upper reaches.

South Branch Leach Creek is a Trout Stocked Fishery for its entire length.

== History ==
South Branch Leach Creek was entered into the Geographic Names Information System on January 1, 1990. Its identifier in the Geographic Names Information System is 1202409. The creek was added due to its presence in Patton's Philadelphia and Suburbs Street and Road Map, which was published in 1984.

A mid-20th-century report found the length of the streambed of South Branch Leach Creek within coal measures to be 6,000 feet (1,800 m).

== See also ==
- List of rivers of Pennsylvania
- List of tributaries of the Lackawanna River
