= Pancoast Creek =

Pancoast Creek Trib 28544 Of Lackawanna River

Physical characteristics
- Source
  - location: Bell Mountain in Dickson City, Lackawanna County, Pennsylvania
  - elevation: between 1,580 and 1,600 feet (480 and 490 m)
- Mouth
  - location: Price Creek in Dickson City, Lackawanna County, Pennsylvania
  - coordinates: 41°27′33″N 75°37′17″W
  - elevation: 751 ft (229 m)
- Length: 2.0 mi (3.2 km)
- Basin size: 0.880 mi^{2} (2.28 km^{2})

Basin features
- Progression: Price Creek → Lackawanna River → Susquehanna River → Chesapeake Bay

Pancoast Creek (also known as Trib 28544 Of Lackawanna River) is a tributary of Price Creek in Lackawanna County, Pennsylvania, in the United States. It is approximately 2.0 miles (3.2 km) long and flows through Dickson City. The watershed of the creek has an area of 0.880 square miles (2.28 km^{2}). Part of the watershed is on coal measures. The creek was historically affected by streams of surface water and sewage. A number of wetlands are in the creek's vicinity.

== Course ==
Pancoast Creek begins on Bell Mountain in Dickson City. It flows nearly due south for about a mile and receives an unnamed tributary from the left before turning south-southwest. The creek then turns southeast for several tenths of a mile before reaching its confluence with Price Creek.

== Hydrology ==
In the early 1900s, Pancoast Creek was clear of culm from its source downstream to its mouth unlike Price Creek, into which it flows. However, Pancoast Creek was discolored by streams of surface water and sewage. The borough of Dickson City once applied for a permit to discharge stormwater into the creek.

A mid-20th-century report estimated that the rate of surface water seepage into mine workings at Pancoast Creek was 6.24 gallons per minute per inch of rain. The estimated rate of streambed seepage into mine workings was 3.49 gallons per minute per inch of rain.

== Geography and geology ==
The elevation near the mouth of Pancoast Creek is 751 feet (229 m) above sea level. The elevation of the creek's source is between 1,580 and 1,600 feet (480 and 490 m) above sea level.

A mid-20th-century report found that a total of 0.563 square miles (1.46 km^{2}) of the watershed of Pancoast Creek was on coal measures. The report found that approximately 10,600 feet (3,200 m) of the creek's length were on coal measures.

There are several wetland patches near Pancoast Creek. A 100 year floodplain is also present near the creek's middle reaches. The creek crosses a number of streets and roads, including a spur of U.S. Route 6.

== Watershed ==
The watershed of Pancoast Creek has an area of 0.880 square miles (2.28 km^{2}). The mouth of Pancoast Creek is in the United States Geological Survey quadrangle of Olyphant. However, its source is in the quadrangle of Scranton.

Pancoast Creek is designated as a Coldwater Fishery.

== History ==
Pancoast Creek was entered into the Geographic Names Information System on January 1, 1990. Its identifier in the Geographic Names Information System is 1202414. The creek was added because of its presence in Patton's Philadelphia and Suburbs Street and Road Map, which was published in 1984. The creek is also known as "Trib 28544 Of Lackawanna River".

== See also ==
- List of rivers of Pennsylvania
- List of tributaries of the Lackawanna River
