= Clover Hill Creek =

Stream in Pennsylvania, United States

Clover Hill Creek Trib 28528 to Leggetts Creek

Physical characteristics
- Source
  - location: Bell Mountain in Dickson City, Lackawanna County, Pennsylvania
  - elevation: between 1,760 and 1,780 feet (540 and 540 m)
- Mouth
  - location: Leggetts Creek in Scranton, Lackawanna County, Pennsylvania
  - coordinates: 41°27′17″N 75°39′43″W
  - elevation: 906 ft (276 m)
- Length: 1.6 mi (2.6 km)
- Basin size: 2 mi^{2} (5.2 km^{2})

Basin features
- Progression: Leggetts Creek → Lackawanna River → Susquehanna River → Chesapeake Bay

Clover Hill Creek (also known as Trib 28528 to Leggetts Creek) is a tributary of Leggetts Creek in Lackawanna County, Pennsylvania, in the United States. It is approximately 1.6 miles (2.6 km) long and flows through Dickson City and Scranton. The watershed of the creek has an area of approximately 2 square miles (5.2 km^{2}). The upper reaches of the creek's watershed are on forested land and lightly populated residential land. However, the lower reaches are extensively channelized and culvertized.

== Course ==
Clover Hill Creek begins on Bell Mountain in Dickson City. It flows south-southwest down the mountain for more than a mile before crossing a highway. The creek then continues flowing south-southwest alongside the highway, entering Scranton. A few tenths of a mile further downstream, it crosses Interstate 81 and reaches its confluence with Leggetts Creek.

Clover Hill Creek joins Leggetts Creek approximately 2 miles (3.2 km) upstream of its mouth.

== Hydrology ==
Various Swales and inlets direct stormwater from roads into Clover Hill Creek. Biofiltration systems and various other systems have been recommended for this area.

== Geography and geology ==
The elevation near the mouth of Clover Hill Creek is 906 feet (276 m) above sea level. The elevation of the creek's source is between 1,760 and 1,780 feet (540 and 540 m) above sea level.

The headwaters of Clover Hill Creek are in springs on a ridge known as Bell Mountain. In its upper reaches, the creek has a steep course and is on a forested mountainside with numerous splash pools and rock ledge falls. However, there are some local roads nearby in the lightly inhabited residential Bell Mountain neighborhood. However, in its lower reaches, the creek has been severely channelized and flows next to a highway.

The channel of Clover Hill Creek is deeply incised near Hollow Road. It flows through a culvert under the Scranton/Carbondale Highway and through a riprap channel as it flows alongside that highway. The creek flows through two pipes with a size of 12 inches (30 cm).

== Watershed and biology ==
The watershed of Clover Hill Creek has an area of approximately 2 square miles (5.2 km^{2}). The creek is entirely within the United States Geological Survey quadrangle of Scranton.

Clover Hill Creek is a first-order stream. The main land uses in the watershed's upper reaches are forested land and residential land. Other land uses in the watershed include Highway Commercial. A small patch of wetland is located near the creek's middle reaches.

The riparian buffer of Clover Hill Creek is largely forested in its upper reaches. Further downstream, the buffer consists of meadow grasses and herbaceous plants. The creek is a Trout Stocked Fishery for its entire length.

== History ==
Clover Hill Creek was entered into the Geographic Names Information System on January 1, 1990. Its identifier in the Geographic Names Information System is 1202403. The creek was added due to its presence on Patton's Philadelphia and Suburbs Street and Road Map, which was published in 1984. It is also known as "Trib 28528 to Leggetts Creek".

During heavy rains in 2013, Clover Hill Creek temporarily flooded over US Route 6, blocking off an entrance to the Viewmont Mall.

== See also ==
- Leach Creek, next tributary of Leggetts Creek going downstream
- Summit Lake Creek, next tributary of Leggetts Creek going upstream
- List of rivers of Pennsylvania
- List of tributaries of the Lackawanna River
