= Summit Lake Creek =

- Location of Summit Lake Creek mouth Summit Lake Creek (the United States)

Physical characteristics
- Source
  - location: valley in Newton Township, Lackawanna County, Pennsylvania
  - elevation: between 1,260 and 1,280 feet (380 and 390 m)
- Mouth
  - location: Leggetts Creek in South Abington Township, Lackawanna County, Pennsylvania
  - coordinates: 41°28′30″N 75°40′59″W
  - elevation: 1,063 ft (324 m)
- Length: 2.1 mi (3.4 km)
- Basin size: 3.08 sq mi (8.0 km^{2})

Basin features
- Progression: Leggetts Creek → Lackawanna River → Susquehanna River → Chesapeake Bay

Summit Lake Creek is a tributary of Leggetts Creek in Lackawanna County, Pennsylvania, in the United States. It is approximately 2.1 miles (3.4 km) long and flows through Newton Township and South Abington Township. The watershed of the creek has an area of 3.08 square miles (8.0 km^{2}). It is a Trout Stocked Fishery and a Migratory Fishery. Reaches of the creek are considered to be impaired. There are a number of lakes and reservoirs in the watershed. The creek has one unnamed tributary, which is known as Unt 28530.

== Course ==
Summit Lake Creek begins in a valley in Newton Township. It flows east-northeast for several tenths of a mile, passing through the Interlaken Lake, entering South Abington Township, and crossing Pennsylvania Route 307 before turning southeast and crossing Interstate 476. The creek then turns east for several tenths of a mile and passes through Maple Lake before turning east-northeast for several tenths of a mile.

Summit Lake Creek joins Leggetts Creek 3.90 miles (6.28 km) upstream of its mouth.

=== Tributaries ===
Summit Lake Creek has no named tributaries. However, it has an unnamed tributary, which is known as "Unt 28530".

== Hydrology ==
A reach of Summit Lake Creek is considered to be impaired by sedimentation/siltation and temperature. The probable sources of the impairment are infrastructure and upstream impoundments. This reach is 1.66 miles (2.67 km) long. Another reach of the creek is considered to be impaired by water/flow variability. This reach is 1.30 miles (2.09 km) long. The probable source of the impairment is urban runoff/storm sewers. The unnamed tributary Unt 28530 is also impaired.

== Geography and geology ==
The elevation near the mouth of Summit Lake Creek is 1,063 feet (324 m) above sea level. The elevation near the source of the creek is between 1,260 and 1,280 feet (380 and 390 m) above sea level.

Lakes such as Maple Lake and Summit Lake are in the watershed of Summit Lake Creek. Maple Lake is an artificial 2.4-acre reservoir with a capacity of 4,000,000 gallons. Summit Lake is an originally natural 57-acre lake with a capacity of 259,000,000 gallons.

== Watershed ==
The watershed of Summit Lake Creek has an area of 3.08 square miles (8.0 km^{2}). The creek is entirely within the United States Geological Survey quadrangle of Scranton.

The upper reaches of Summit Lake Creek are on undisturbed land. However, the lower reaches of the creek flow through developed land. The borough of Clarks Summit has a permit to discharge stormwater into the creek.

The designated use of Summit Lake Creek is aquatic life.

== History ==
Summit Lake Creek was entered into the Geographic Names Information System on August 2, 1979. Its identifier in the Geographic Names Information System is 1199652.

A concrete slab bridge carrying State Route 4032 over Summit Lake Creek was built in South Abington Township in 1904. It is 21.0 feet (6.4 m) long. A concrete tee beam bridge carrying US Route 11 over the creek was constructed in 1936. This bridge is 36.1 feet (11.0 m) long and is also situated in South Abington Township.

The Maple Lake Dam was constructed on Summit Lake Creek in the 1800s. However, it was removed in December 2006. In 2011, Pennsylvania American Water, awarded a $2500 grant to the Clarks Summit Shade Tree Commission to reforest the area at the mouth of the creek and to clean up its streambed to avert potential flash flooding problems.

== Biology ==
The entire drainage basin of Summit Lake Creek is a Trout-Stocked Fishery and a Migratory Fishery.

== See also ==
- Clover Hill Creek, next tributary of Leggetts Creek going downstream
- List of rivers of Pennsylvania
- List of tributaries of the Lackawanna River
