= Leach Creek =

Physical characteristics
- Source
  - location: pond in a deep valley near Morgan Manor in Scranton, Lackawanna County, Pennsylvania
  - elevation: between 1,320 and 1,340 feet (400 and 410 m)
- Mouth
  - location: Leggetts Creek in Scranton, Lackawanna County, Pennsylvania
  - coordinates: 41°26′35″N 75°39′38″W
  - elevation: 781 ft (238 m)
- Length: 1.9 mi (3.1 km)
- Basin size: 2.55 sq mi (6.6 km^{2})

Basin features
- Progression: Leggetts Creek → Lackawanna River → Susquehanna River → Chesapeake Bay
- Tributaries
  - right: South Branch Leach Creek

Leach Creek is a tributary of Leggetts Creek in Lackawanna County, Pennsylvania, in the United States. It is approximately 1.9 miles (3.1 km) long and flows through Scranton. The watershed of the creek has an area of 2.55 square miles (6.6 km^{2}). The creek loses substantial amounts of water to underground mine pools. The creek is in the Coal Region and has been channelized and/or culvertized in some reaches. It flows alongside Pennsylvania Route 307 for a substantial part of its length. The creek has a riparian buffer in its upper and middle reaches, but various invasive plants grow along its banks in its lower reaches.

== Course ==
Leach Creek begins in a pond in a deep valley near Morgan Manor in Scranton. It flows southeast alongside Pennsylvania Route 307 before turning south and continuing to flow alongside that highway. After a few tenths of a mile, the creek turns southeast again and receives South Branch Leach Creek, its only named tributary, from the right. It then turns south-southeast for several tenths of a mile and crosses Pennsylvania Route 307 before turning east and crossing US Route 11. After several tenths of a mile, the creek reaches its confluence with Leggetts Creek.

Leach Creek joins Leggetts Creek 1.00 mile (1.61 km) upstream of its mouth.

== Hydrology ==
Leach Creek experiences a measurable amount of flow loss to underground mine pools via cracks in the bedrock. This water contributes to the Marvine Pool and the Stoors Pool. It typically, but not always, lacks any base flow. Several establishments discharge stormwater into the creek. There are an estimated two stormwater detention facilities in the watershed. The creek experiences extreme sedimentation and embeddedness in its lower reaches. The city of Scranton applied for a permit to discharge stormwater into the creek.

In the early 1900s, Leach Creek was found to be a clear stream above the Cayuga Shaft, where mine water flowed into the creek. From that point downstream, culm in the water deposited on the banks and streambed. In 1948, the creek was found to lose between 968 and 1319 gallons of water per minute to mines.

At its mouth, the peak annual discharge of Leach Creek has a 10 percent chance of reaching 430 cubic feet per second. It has a 2 percent chance of reaching 1000 cubic feet per second and a 1 percent chance of reaching 1360 cubic feet per second. It has a 0.2 percent chance of reaching 2760 cubic feet per second. Like many other streams in the area, the creek is prone to flash floods.

== Geography and geology ==
The elevation near the mouth of Leach Creek is 781 feet (238 m) above sea level. The elevation of the creek's source is between 1,320 and 1,340 feet (400 and 410 m) above sea level.

Leach Creek is in the Anthracite Region. It flows through coal measures and is a typical example of such a stream. The surficial geology along the lower reaches of the creek mainly consists of urban land, Wisconsinan Till, and surface mining land. The upper reaches of the creek are near urban land, Wisconsinan Till, and bedrock consisting of coal, conglomerate, sandstone, and shale.

A small wetland pond forms the headwaters of Leach Creek. In its lower reaches, the creek is culvertized by a stone arch culvert in one reach and flows through a tall, narrow stone channel under a culm pile in one reach. Garbage has been dumped along the stream in its lower reaches. In its lower reaches, it has been ripraped and flows through a flood control debris basin. The debris basin was constructed by the Pennsylvania Department of Environmental Protection and prevents flooding on Bloom Street.

Leach Creek flows over cobbles in some reaches. The creek flows through 49 pipes, with sizes ranging from 3 to 60 inches (7.6 to 152.4 cm).

== Watershed ==
The watershed of Leach Creek has an area of 2.55 square miles (6.6 km^{2}). The stream is entirely within the United States Geological Survey quadrangle of Scranton. The creek is a second-order stream. Most of the watershed is in Scranton. However, substantial areas of it are in South Abington Township, Ransom Township, and Newton Township.

Leach Creek is highly urbanized and may be channelized in some locations. Neighborhoods in the creek's vicinity include Morgan Manor, Allied Services, and Keyser Oak Plaza. Land uses in the watershed include low-density residential, industrial, and commercial. A patch of wetland occurs in the southwestern part of the watershed and a smaller patch is located near the center of the watershed.

For a substantial of its length, Leach Creek is in the vicinity of Pennsylvania Route 307. A cemetery, a medical services complex, and a condominium are also in the creek's vicinity. However, there is little development directly along the creek's banks in its upper and middle reaches. In the creek's lower reaches, it is heavily impacted by urban development. It flows past the Keyser-Oak Shopping Mall in this reach.

Major roads in the watershed of Leach Creek include Pennsylvania Route 307, Market Street, Morgan Manor Drive, Moffat Drive, Yard Avenue, Keyser Avenue, Bloom Avenue, McDonough Avenue, and the North Scranton Expressway.

== History ==
Leach Creek was redirected under Keyser Avenue in 1909.

A concrete culvert bridge carrying Pennsylvania Route 307 over Leach Creek was built in 1969 in Scranton. This bridge is 27.9 feet (8.5 m) long.

Historic places in the watershed of Leach Creek include the Cayuga Vault. A $100,000 Leach Creek Basin Maintenance Project has been proposed.

== Biology ==
Leach Creek has a stable riparian buffer in its upper and middle reaches. However, in its lower reaches the riparian area is almost nonexistent and is overgrown with invasive plants. In this reach, the understory is dominated by Japanese knotweed and the canopy is dominated by Ailanthus and Norway maple. The riparian buffer mainly consists of one line of trees. The aquatic habitat of the creek would require significant restoration efforts to be repaired.

The entire length of Leach Creek is a Trout Stocked Fishery.

== See also ==
- Clover Hill Creek, next tributary of Leggetts Creek going upstream
- List of rivers of Pennsylvania
- List of tributaries of the Lackawanna River
