= Meadow Brook (Lackawanna River tributary) =

River in the United States of America

Physical characteristics
- Source
  - location: near the Dunmore Cemetery in Dunmore, Lackawanna County, Pennsylvania
  - elevation: 935 ft (285 m)
- Mouth
  - location: Lackawanna River in Scranton, Lackawanna County, Pennsylvania
  - coordinates: 41°25′28″N 75°39′29″W
  - elevation: 692 ft (211 m)
- Length: 2.0 mi (3.2 km)
- Basin size: 2.43 sq mi (6.3 km^{2})
- Discharge
  - average: typically ~0 (except for stormwater flows)

Basin features
- Progression: Lackawanna River → Susquehanna River → Chesapeake Bay

Meadow Brook is a tributary of the Lackawanna River in Lackawanna County, Pennsylvania, in the United States. It is approximately 2.0 miles (3.2 km) long and flows through Dunmore and Scranton. The watershed of the stream has an area of 2.43 square miles (6.3 km^{2}), though it used to be considerably larger. It is designated as a Coldwater Fishery and a Migratory Fishery, but many reaches of the stream have been destroyed by mining or post-mining development impacts. The stream flows through a culvert system for much of its length. However, there are areas where it is in an open concrete channel or has a natural streambed. There are also patches of old-growth forest along the stream in the Forest Hill Cemetery.

Meadow Brook has experienced significant flow loss and what flow it does have mainly consists of intermittent stormwater flows. There used to be springs, seeps, and wetlands at the stream's headwaters. However, a colliery (and later a landfill) was built over that area. The headwaters of Meadow Brook were sourced from an area of springs and wetland bogs at the base of Moosic Mountain. The natural habitat and drainage functions of these headwaters were destroyed by the Pennsylvania Coal Company’s Gypsy Grove Colliery beginning in the 1860’s. Today, the headwaters area land use is dominated by the Keystone Landfill and Interstate 81.The Dunmore Cemetery and the Forest Hill Cemetery are in the stream's vicinity. Meadow Brook is a first-order stream.

== Course ==
Meadow Brook begins near the Dunmore Cemetery in Dunmore. It flows north-northwest for a short distance before turning west for a few tenths of a mile. The stream then turns west-southwest for more than a mile, entering Scranton and losing its surface flow. It then turns southwest for a few tenths of a mile, briefly regaining its surface flow before losing it again and gaining it once more. A short distance further downstream, the stream reaches its confluence with the Lackawanna River.

Meadow Brook joins the Lackawanna River 11.83 miles (19.04 km) upriver of its mouth.

=== Tributaries ===
Meadow Brook used to have a tributary. However, the tributary was destroyed by operations by the Price-Pancost Coal Company in the 1890s, the construction of Interstate 81, and the construction of the Marywood University campus in the 1960s.

== Hydrology and climate ==
Meadow Brook experiences complete flow loss in some reaches. Reaches of the stream have also been entirely destroyed by past mining or post-mining development. It mainly serves as a sewer shed and its flow consists of intermittent stormwater flows. There is one stormwater detention facility in the stream's watershed. It is owned by the Swift Fence Company.

Several combined sewer overflows in the watershed of Meadow Brook have been identified and removed since the 1990s. The stream typically has a dry streambed. Large amounts of debris have been found in the stream and the streambed, including landscape waste, floral waste, tree debris, and trash. Large deposits of sediment are also present near Jefferson Avenue.

At its mouth, the peak annual discharge of Meadow Brook has a 10 percent chance of reaching 630 cubic feet per second (18 m^{3}/s). It has a 2 percent chance of reaching 850 cubic feet per second (24 m^{3}/s) and a 1 percent chance of reaching 950 cubic feet per second (27 m^{3}/s). The peak annual discharge has a 0.2 percent chance of reaching 1,110 cubic feet per second (31 m^{3}/s). Springtime water temperature measurements of the stream have ranged from 54 to 59 °F (12 to 15 °C).

== Geography and geology ==
The elevation near the mouth of Meadow Brook is 692 feet (211 m) above sea level. The elevation near the stream's source is 935 feet (285 m) above sea level.

Meadow Brook has been so severely affected by urban development or historic mining that it no longer resembles a stream. It has been described as "essentially non-existent". However, some features of the stream's channel still remain. It is similar in these respects to some other streams in the area. Where the streambed is still natural, it consists of a mixture of cobbles and rocks.

The source of Meadow Brook used to be a series of springs and seeps on a ridge near the base of the Moosic Mountains. The springs also fed a complex of glacial bogs and wetlands. However, the Pennsylvania Coal Company eventually constructed the Gypsy Grove Colliery on the site, and eventually the Keystone Sanitary Landfill came to occupy the area.

Two stone arch bridges cross Meadow Brook in the Forest Hill Cemetery, where the stream still maintains a natural channel. Other reaches of the stream are above ground, but in a concrete channel. However, there is an extensive underground culvert system on the stream, and most of its length is within that system. The culvert system crosses under a dozen streets. The stream flows through seven pipes with sizes ranging from 3 to 24 inches (7.6 to 61.0 cm).

== Watershed ==
The watershed of Meadow Brook has an area of 2.43 square miles (6.3 km^{2}). However, it used to have a watershed with an area of 4.0 square miles (10 km^{2}). The stream is entirely within the United States Geological Survey quadrangle of Scranton. The stream is classified as a first-order stream.

Major land uses in the watershed of Meadow Brook include high-density residential land, industrial land, and open space. The Green Ridge neighborhood is near the stream; other nearby neighborhoods include Hollywood, Marywood University, the Dunmore Cemetery, and the Forest Hill Cemetery. The Keystone Landfill and Interstate 81 are the main land uses in the vicinity of the watershed's upper reaches. A bioswale has been constructed in the stream's watershed, as have subsurface infiltration beds.

Meadow Brook is a source of flooding in the borough of Dunmore. Floodwaters from the stream during Hurricane Diane in 1955 damaged low-lying land in the borough.

== History ==
Meadow Brook was entered into the Geographic Names Information System on August 2, 1979. Its identifier in the Geographic Names Information System is 1199142.

A reach of Meadow Brook from the Oral School to Sanderson Avenue was culvertized in the 1880s, during the development of the Green Ridge neighborhood. By 1900, the stream had completely lost all of its natural functions, with its base flow being lost due to underground mining. In 1909, the Pennsylvania Coal Company diverted water from the stream into the Underwood Mine Drainage Tunnel. In the 1960s, the Pennsylvania Department of Environmental Protection diverted more water to construct boreholes leading to the Underwood Tunnel. In 1995 and 1997, an artificial watershed was constructed to divert stormwater flows from Interstate 81 away from the stream.

There are several cemeteries and institutions in the middle of the watershed of Meadow Brook.

In the early 2000s, the Lackawanna River Watershed Conservation Plan recommended that the city of Scranton include protection of Meadow Brook in its zoning plans. It also recommended including the restoration of the stream in the comprehensive plan for Scranton. Restoration of the stream is impractical, but it is possible to conserve surviving stream reaches, such as those near the Dunmore Cemetery and Marywood University. The stream's culvert system between Penn Avenue and its mouth was rebuilt in 2004 in a $6 million project funded by the Commonwealth of Pennsylvania.

== Biology ==
The drainage basin of Meadow Brook is designated as a coldwater fishery and a migratory fishery.

In the reach near the Forest Hill Cemetery, where a natural stream channel still remains, there are some patches of old-growth forest on Meadow Brook. As of the early 2000s, more than twenty white pines, hemlocks, and red oaks with ages over 150 years inhabited this area. However, in 1996, the Cemetery Association allowed the harvesting of more than a dozen even older trees from the area. The harvested trees were between 175 and 250 years old.

In addition to old-growth forests, the understory in the Forest Hill Cemetery reach of Meadow Brook contains old-growth rhododendrons. Mountain laurel and other forested plants occur in the stream's riparian area.

In 1997, the area along a reach of Meadow Brook was noted to be suitable for small mammals such as squirrels, rabbits, and mice. However, no wildlife was observed in this reach except for birds.

== See also ==
- Roaring Brook (Lackawanna River), next tributary of the Lackawanna River going downriver
- Leggetts Creek, next tributary of the Lackawanna River going upriver
- List of rivers of Pennsylvania
- List of tributaries of the Lackawanna River
