= Price Creek (Pennsylvania) =

Price Creek Price's Creek

Physical characteristics
- Source
  - location: Bell Mountain in Dickson City, Lackawanna County, Pennsylvania
  - elevation: between 1,360 and 1,380 feet (410 and 420 m)
- Mouth
  - location: Lackawanna River in Dickson City, Lackawanna County, Pennsylvania
  - coordinates: 41°27′27″N 75°37′14″W
  - elevation: 732 ft (223 m)
- Length: 2.0 mi (3.2 km)
- Basin size: 0.790 mi^{2} (2.05 km^{2})(main stem only)

Basin features
- Progression: Lackawanna River → Susquehanna River → Chesapeake Bay
- Tributaries
  - right: Pancoast Creek

Price Creek (also known as Price's Creek) is a tributary of the Lackawanna River in Lackawanna County, Pennsylvania, in the United States. It is approximately 2.0 miles (3.2 km) long and flows through Dickson City. The watershed of the creek's main stem has an area of 0.790 square miles (2.05 km^{2}). Culm was historically discharged into the creek at the Johnson Colliery. Requests have been made in the 20th and 21st centuries for permission to discharge sewage and stormwater into the creek.

== Course ==
Price Creek begins on Bell Mountain in Dickson City. It flows southwest for a short distance before turning south-southeast for a few tenths of a mile and crossing a highway. The creek then turns south-southwest for a few tenths of a mile before turning south-southeast for several tenths of a mile. It then turns south-southwest again before turning south and receiving the Pancoast Creek, its only named tributary, from the right. A short distance further downstream, it reaches its confluence with the Lackawanna River.

Price Creek joins the Lackawanna River on its right bank.

== Hydrology ==
In the early 1900s, Price Creek was a clear stream until it arrived at the Johnson Colliery, where mine water and waste water was drained into it. From this point downstream to its mouth, the creek's streambed was full of a type of anthracite known as culm. The tributary Pancoast Creek is unaffected by culm, but it was affected by streams of surface water and sewage.

A mid-20th-century report estimated the volume of surface seepage into mine workings at Price Creek was 4.22 gallons per minute per inch of rainfall. The rate of streambed seepage in the area was estimated to be 3.71 gallons per minute per inch of rainfall.

== Geography and geology ==
The elevation near the mouth of Price Creek is 732 feet (223 m) above sea level. The elevation of the creek's source is between 1,360 and 1,380 feet (410 and 420 m) above sea level.

A total of 0.418 square miles (1.08 km^{2}) of the watershed of the main stem of Price Creek is in coal measures. An estimated 8,900 feet (2,700 m) of the creek is on coal measures. A 100-year floodplain is also present near the creek. The creek crosses a spur of U.S. Route 6.

== Watershed ==
The watershed of Price Creek has an area of 0.790 square miles (2.05 km^{2}), not counting the watershed of the tributary Pancoast Creek. The mouth of Price Creek is in the United States Geological Survey quadrangle of Olyphant. However, its source is in the quadrangle of Scranton.

Price Creek is designated as a Coldwater Fishery for its entire length.

== History ==
Price Creek was entered into the Geographic Names Information System on January 1, 1990. Its identifier in the Geographic Names Information System is 1202413. The creek was added due to its presence in Patton's Philadelphia and Suburbs Street and Road Map, which was published in 1984.

In the early 1900s, the borough of Dickson City was divided into three drainage districts. Price Creek flowed through the first district. During this time period, the borough requested permission to discharge sewage into the creek. More recently, Lackawanna County requested a permit to discharge stormwater into the creek.

== See also ==
- Leggetts Creek, next tributary of the Lackawanna River going downriver
- Eddy Creek (Lackawanna River), next tributary of the Lackawanna River going upriver
- List of rivers of Pennsylvania
- List of tributaries of the Lackawanna River
