= Leggetts Creek =

River in the United States of America

Leggetts Creek Legget Creek, Leggett's Gap Creek, Leggits Creek, Liggett's Creek
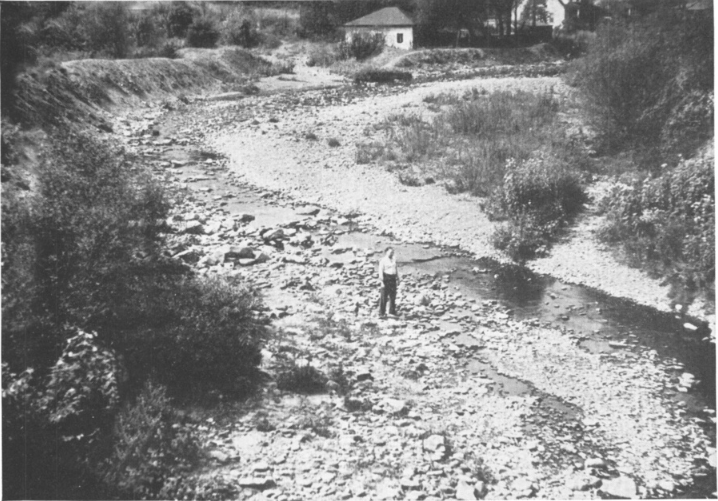
- Leggetts Creek 4,300 feet (1,300 m) upstream of its mouth
- Etymology: James Leggett, an early settler in the area

Physical characteristics
- Source
  - location: wetland in Scott Township, Lackawanna County, Pennsylvania
  - elevation: between 1,600 and 1,620 feet (490 and 490 m)
- Mouth
  - location: Lackawanna River in Scranton, Lackawanna County, Pennsylvania
  - coordinates: 41°26′41″N 75°38′36″W
  - elevation: 715 ft (218 m)
- Length: 9.0 mi (14.5 km)
- Basin size: 18.5 mi^{2} (48 km^{2})

Basin features
- Progression: Lackawanna River → Susquehanna River → Chesapeake Bay
- Tributaries
  - left: Clover Hill Creek
  - right: Summit Lake Creek, Leach Creek

Leggetts Creek (also known as Legget Creek, Leggett's Gap Creek, Leggits Creek and originally as Liggett's Creek) is a tributary of the Lackawanna River in Lackawanna County, Pennsylvania, in the United States. It is approximately 9.0 miles (14.5 km) long and flows through Scott Township, South Abington Township, and Scranton. The watershed of the creek has an area of 18.5 square miles (48 km^{2}). The creek has three named tributaries: Leach Creek, Clover Hill Creek, and Summit Lake Creek. Leggetts Creek is considered to be impaired due to urban development problems, but is not affected by acid mine drainage. The creek is fairly alkaline and is a perennial stream. Its headwaters are in wetlands outside of the Lackawanna Valley and it flows through a water gap known as Leggetts Gap or The Notch. Major lakes in the watershed include the Griffin Reservoir (which is used as a water supply), Summit Lake, and Maple Lake. The creek is a source of flooding in South Abington Township.

A historic Native American path used to pass through the water gap of Leggetts Creek on its way from the headwaters of the Lehigh River to the Great Bend on the Susquehanna River near the Pennsylvania/New York border. Some mining and quarrying operations have been done in the watershed and the Liggett's Gap Railroad was built and was opened, through what was called Liggett's Gap at the time, on April 15, 1851. In the late 19th, 20th, and early 21st centuries, numerous bridges were constructed across the creek. Wild trout naturally reproduce within the creek and several other species have been observed in its waters as well. Some reaches of the creek have a riparian buffer consisting of old growth forests. In other places, there are grasslands or invasive plants. A greenway/connecting trail along the creek was proposed in the Lackawanna River Watershed Conservation Plan.

== Course ==
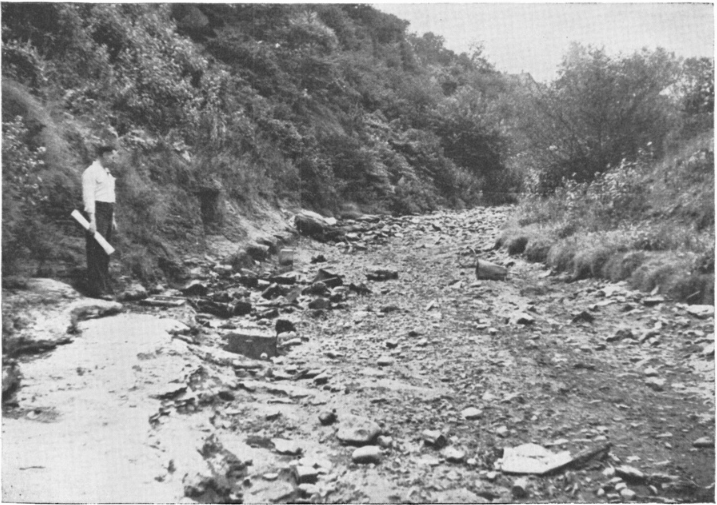
Leggetts Creek 1,300 feet (400 m) upstream of its mouth

Leggetts Creek begins in a wetland in Scott Township. It flows southwest for several tenths of a mile before turning south and flowing alongside Pennsylvania Route 347. After more than a mile, the creek passes near the community of Justus in Scott Township and turns west. After several tenths of a mile, it passes the Griffin Reservoir and enters South Abington Township. From the southwestern end of the reservoir, the creek flows southwest for more than a mile before turning south-southwest and crossing Interstate 81. After some distance, the creek receives Summit Lake Creek, its first named tributary, from the right and turns southeast. For the next few miles, the creek flows alongside US Route 6 and Interstate 81 through a water gap between West Mountain and Bell Mountain. In the water gap, the creek eventually turns south for some distance and enters Scranton before turning south-southeast, leaving the water gap and receiving the tributary Clover Hill Creek from the left. It then turns south-southwest for several tenths of a mile before receiving Leach Creek, its last named tributary, from the right. The creek then turns east for several tenths of a mile before turning north for several hundred feet and then turning east again. After several hundred feet, it reaches its confluence with the Lackawanna River.

Leggetts Creek reaches its confluence with the Lackawanna River 14.36 miles (23.11 km) upriver of its mouth.

=== Tributaries ===
Leggetts Creek has three named direct tributaries: Leach Creek, Clover Hill Creek, and Summit Lake Creek. Leach Creek joins Leggetts Creek 1.00 mile (1.61 km) upstream of its mouth. Its watershed has an area of 2.55 square miles (6.6 km^{2}). Summit Lake Creek joins Leggetts Creek 3.90 miles (6.28 km) upstream of its mouth. Its watershed has an area of 3.08 square miles (8.0 km^{2}). Leggetts Creek also has a number of first-order tributaries that are locally named, but not officially named.

== Hydrology ==
Leggetts Creek is considered by the Pennsylvania Department of Environmental Protection to be impaired due to urban development problems.

It is possible that Leggetts Creek sometimes exceeds its total maximum daily load, especially during low flow conditions and the summer months. There are some mine drainage issues on the creek between Rockwell Avenue and Charles Street. It experiences some flow loss to underground mine voids. In 1978, the Pennsylvania Department of Environmental Resources (now known as the Pennsylvania Department of Environmental Protection) estimated that the creek lost 20 to 30 percent of its flow to mines during dry weather. However, the creek is large enough that this does not cause aquatic habitat to be lost. The Chinchilla sewage treatment plant discharges into the creek in the vicinity of Leggetts Gap. In its lower reaches, the creek is impacted by past mining, urban development, and debris. Stormwater also flows into the Lackawanna River via the creek and it is affected by fine sediment. There is one stormwater detention facility in the watershed, at Leggett's Creek Estates.

South Abington Township once applied for a permit to discharge stormwater associated with construction activities into Leggetts Creek and for a permit for "Stormwater Discharges from Municipal Separate Storm Sewer Systems" into the creek.

Leggetts Creek attains its designated uses. However, its water quality and habitat quality are significantly impacted and it contributes significantly to the degradation of the Lackawanna River. The degradation is mainly due to urbanization, as opposed to abandoned mine drainage. The creek is a perennial stream. In a 2009 study, the creek was described as showing "some degraded conditions".

Leggetts Creek has relatively high levels of total dissolved solids and electrical conductivity. The electrical conductivity of the creek ranged from 538.00 to 979.50 micro-siemens per centimeter, with an average of 677.54 micro-siemens per centimeter. The concentration of dissolved solids ranged from 50.00 to 680.00 milligrams per liter, with an average of 411.96 milligrams per liter. The creek is fairly alkaline, with a pH ranging from 7.64 to 9.23 and averaging 8.20. The concentration of salinity in the creek averages 345 parts per million, but reaches levels as high as 435 parts per million and as low as 280 parts per million. This is within the recommended limit of 1000 parts per million, but a 2013/2014 study nevertheless recommended reducing the salinity of the creek.

The concentration of dissolved oxygen in Leggetts Creek ranges from 28.95% to 236.75%, with an average of 119.27%. The concentration of nitrates in the creek was once found to be 2.50 milligrams per liter and the concentration of phosphates was once found to be 1.58 milligrams per liter. However, in 2001, the concentration of nutrients and sodium in the creek was found to be the highest of tested sites in the area. The concentration of nitrates was 6.3 milligrams per liter and the concentration of nitrogen was 6.87 milligrams per liter. The concentration of orthophosphate was 1.998 milligrams per liter and the total phosphorus concentration was 2.228 milligrams per liter. The sodium concentration was 84.3 milligrams per liter. Little or no overall impairment was observed in 2008.

The peak annual discharge of Leggetts Creek near its mouth has a 10 percent chance of reaching 2180 cubic feet per second. It has a 2 percent chance of reaching 4440 cubic feet per second and a 1 percent chance of reaching 5790 cubic feet per second. The peak annual discharge has a 0.2 percent chance of reaching 10,800 cubic feet per second. The peak annual discharge of the creek upstream of the tributary Leach Creek has a 10 percent chance of reaching 2130 cubic feet per second. It has a 2 percent chance of reaching 4340 cubic feet per second and a 1 percent chance of reaching 5620 cubic feet per second. The peak annual discharge has a 0.2 percent chance of reaching 10,600 cubic feet per second.

The peak annual discharge of Leggetts Creek at Neary Place (Mary Street) has a 10 percent chance of reaching 2470 cubic feet per second. It has a 2 percent chance of reaching 5070 cubic feet per second and a 1 percent chance of reaching 6760 cubic feet per second. The peak annual discharge has a 0.2 percent chance of reaching 12,600 cubic feet per second. The peak annual discharge of the creek at the border between Scranton and South Abington Township has a 10 percent chance of reaching 2130 cubic feet per second. It has a 2 percent chance of reaching 4340 cubic feet per second and a 1 percent chance of reaching 5320 cubic feet per second. The peak annual discharge has a 0.2 percent chance of reaching 9030 cubic feet per second.

== Geography, geology, and climate ==
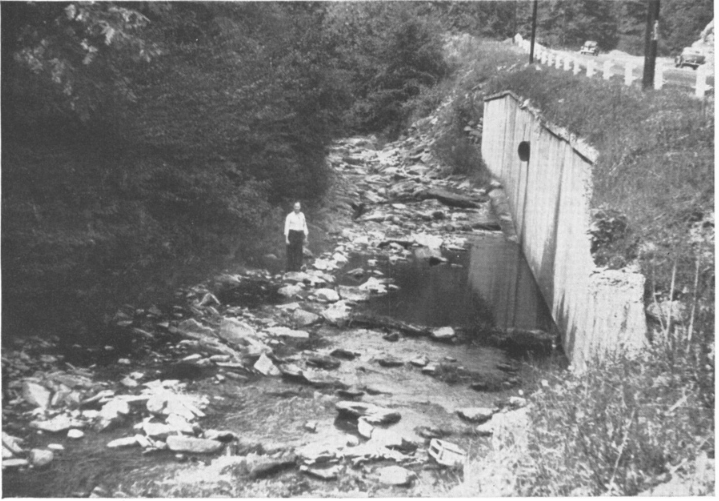
Leggetts Creek 12,000 feet (3,700 m) upstream of its mouth

The elevation near the mouth of Leggetts Creek is 715 feet (218 m) above sea level. The elevation of the creek's source is between 1,600 and 1,620 feet (490 and 490 m) above sea level. During a 2013 fish population survey, the average stream width of the creek was found to be approximately 18 feet (5.5 m).

Leggetts Creek flows through a water gap known as Leggetts Gap or The Notch. The gap is cut through the West or Lackawanna Mountain Range by the creek. There have been some culm banks along the creek and historic mining operations such as those at the Marvine #6 Colliery have affected it. The creek's headwaters are in wetlands surrounded by residential development. There is riprap on the creek in Leggetts Gap as it flows near major highways in this stretch. It typically has a natural channel in part of its lower reaches and there are some reaches with gradual slopes. However, in some parts of the creek's lower reaches, fill has been dumped onto its banks, creating steep slopes. The creek has been channelized in South Abington Township.

There are waterfalls and cascades on a reach of Leggetts Creek from the Griffin Reservoir to an intake dam three quarters of a mile downstream. These waterfalls are formed by rock ledges, boulders, and the remains of an old mill. A streambank stabilization project has been carried out on the creek at South Abington Park. The creek flows through 51 pipes, whose sizes range from 3 to 36 inches (7.6 to 91.4 cm). The Keyser Avenue Borehole is in the vicinity of the creek.

The headwaters of Leggetts Creek are outside of the Lackawanna Valley. At Providence, the creek flowed directly southeast prior to the glacial period, reaching the Lackawanna River approximately 0.5 miles (0.80 km) downstream of its current location. However, the course now flows to the east instead. The old course of the creek has been built over. There is a ledge on the north bank of Leggetts Creek in its lower reaches. The creek makes a sharp eastward bend around Providence. From this point downstream to its mouth, it flows through a rocky channel that contains a thick covering of till on its upper walls.

A run of the river dam known as the High Service Dam is on Leggetts Creek in Scranton. The dam is 12 feet (3.7 m) wide.

A rock formation known as the Campbell's Ledge Black Shale occurs in the vicinity of Leggetts Creek. This rock formation contains shale and coal. The ledge on the northern bank of the creek was in the early 1900s noted to contain a large mass (up to a million tons) of sandy till.

In early March 2013, the temperature in the vicinity of Leggetts Creek was once measured to be 42 °F (6 °C). A 2013/2014 study found the water temperature of the creek to range from 0.97 to 22.64 °C (33.75 to 72.75 °F), with an average of 11.62 °C (52.92 °F).

== Watershed ==
The watershed of Leggetts Creek has an area of 18.5 square miles (48 km^{2}). Upstream of the tributary Leach Creek, the watershed has an area of 15.6 square miles (40 km^{2}). It is one of the larger tributaries of the Lackawanna River. The mouth of the creek is in the United States Geological Survey quadrangle of Scranton. However, its source is in the quadrangle of Dalton. The creek is a third-order stream and is the third-largest tributary of the Lackawanna River, not counting the East Branch Lackawanna River and the West Branch Lackawanna River. Municipalities that the watershed is in include Scott Township, South Abington Township, Abington Township, Clarks Green, Clarks Summit, Newton Township, Dickson City, and Scranton.

Major land uses in the watershed of Leggetts Creek include high-density residential, neighborhood commercial, and open space.

Lakes in the watershed of Leggetts Creek include the Griffin Reservoir, Maple Lake, and Summit Lake. These bodies of water are in South Abington Township and Scott Township. The Griffin Reservoir supplies water to people in the Leggetts Creek watershed. The creek and the reservoir serve as a supplemental drinking water supply for more than 100,000 people as of the late 20th century. A spring known as Fountain Springs is in the watershed in South Abington Township. The Justus Meadows are in the watershed in Scott Township. Most of the watershed is developed, but there are still a few undeveloped reaches of the creek.

As of the early 2000s, the Theta Company owns some tracts of land in the watershed of Leggetts Creek. These include areas around the Griffin Reservoir and Maple Lake. Some property along the creek's floodplain is owned by the city of Scranton. Additionally, there are parcels of abandoned mine lands in the vicinity of the creek in northern Scranton. These parcels may be developed by the 2020s. The major neighborhoods in the watershed include historic residential neighborhoods that were developed between 1870 and 1920.

Leggetts Creek is a source of flooding in South Abington Township, where it commonly floods low-lying properties. Major flooding occurred in the Abingtons and North Scranton in September 2023. The flooding caused substantial damage including road closers, property damages, injuries to people, and 2 fatalities.

== History and etymology ==
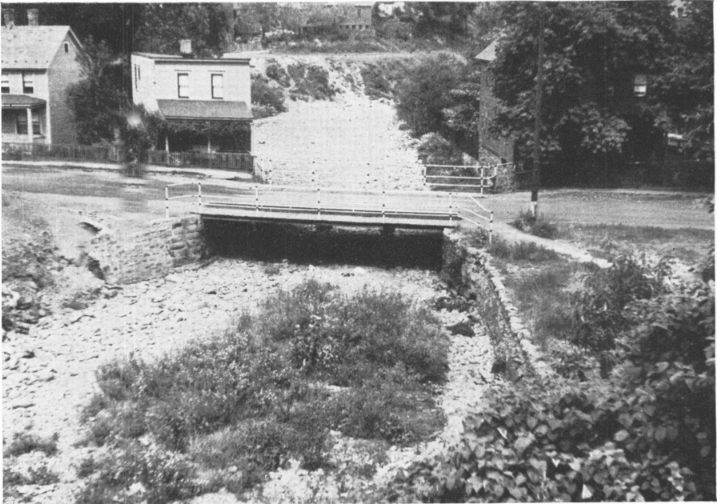
Leggetts Creek flowing under a bridge 300 feet (91 m) upstream of its mouth

Leggetts Creek was entered into the Geographic Names Information System on August 30, 1990. Its identifier in the Geographic Names Information System is 1199030. The creek is also known as Legget Creek, Leggett's Gap Creek, and Leggits Creek. The creek is named after James Leggett, a pioneer who settled there in the 1770s.

A historic Native American path used to pass through the water gap of Leggetts Creek on its way from the headwaters of the Lehigh River to the Great Bend in the Susquehanna River near the Pennsylvania/New York border. Thomas Meredith conceived the idea of a railroad going from the mouth of the creek at Providence to the Great Bend on the Susquehanna River, a distance of 48 miles (77 km), in 1826. Names such as the "Lackawannock and Susquehanna Railroad" and the "Meredith Railroad" were considered, but eventually the name "Leggetts Gap Railroad" was settled on. The railroad was first chartered in 1832, but no progress was made until 1849. The Rockwell Mine at Leggetts Gap was opened in 1854. The Leggetts Creek Colliery was operational in the early 1900s. Additionally, a ledge in the vicinity of the creek was quarried extensively by the early 1900s.

Numerous bridges have been built across Leggetts Creek. A masonry arch bridge with a length of 34.1 feet (10.4 m) carries North Main Street over the creek. A 36.1-foot-long concrete tee beam bridge was built in 1905 and carries Rockwell Avenue across the creek. A 38.1-foot-long concrete tee beam bridge was built in 1936 and carries US Route 11 across the creek. In 1941, a 26.9-foot-long concrete culvert bridge that carries State Route 6006 was constructed over the creek. In 1961, a 32.2-foot-long two-span steel culvert bridge that carries an Interstate 81 ramp was constructed over the creek. A 23.0-foot-long concrete culvert bridge was built in the same year and carries Interstate 81 over the creek.

In 1975, a 48.9-foot-long concrete tee beam bridge was built; this bridge carries Hollow Ave over Leggetts Creek. In 1979, a 37.1-foot-long prestressed box beam or girders bridge was built; it carries Mary Street across the creek. A 44.9-foot-long bridge of the same type was built in the same year and carries Wells Street over the creek. A 43.0-foot-long bridge of a similar type was built in 2009 and carries T-422/Burcher Ave over the creek. A 43.0-foot-long steel stringer/multi-beam or girder bridge was built in 2010 and carries State Route 1027/Layton Road over the creek.

In the late 1960s, a dredging project was proposed on Leggetts Creek to repair the damage caused by acid mine drainage and coal mining. In 1991, the Lackawanna River Corridor Association gathered data on the water chemistry and biological habitats of Leggetts Creek. In 2012, the South Abington Sewer Authority began upgrading its sewage treatment plant to prevent wastewater and nutrient pollution from entering the creek. They also installed new sewer lines, including some that run parallel to or under the creek. PA Trout Unlimited's AMD Technical Assistance Program conducted a survey of the fish population in the creek on November 15, 2013. The Lackawanna Valley Conservancy once received a $190,000 Growing Greener grant for the Leggetts Creek Greenway.

Historic places in the watershed of Leggetts Creek include Griffins Mills, which are in South Abington. The Aladdin Plating site, which is in the watershed of Leggetts Creek in South Abington, is a Superfund site. In the early 2000s, the Lackawanna River Watershed Conservation Plan recommended that Scranton, South Abington Township, and Scott Township include protection of Leggetts Creek in their zoning plans.

== Biology ==
Wild trout naturally reproduce in Leggetts Creek from Summit Lake Creek downstream to its mouth, a distance of 3.60 miles (5.79 km). It is stocked with trout and also is inhabited by some non-game species. The drainage basin of the creek upstream of Summit Lake Creek is a Coldwater Fishery and a Migratory Fishery. From Summit Lake Creek downstream to its mouth, the drainage basin is a Trout Stocked Fishery and a Migratory Fishery. In a 2013 fishery survey of the creek, nine brown trout were observed. Their lengths ranged from 84 to 316 millimeters, with an average of 139 millimeters. The vast majority were in the 75 to 99 millimeter bracket. Their population density was 164 per hectare.

In the fishery survey of Leggetts Creek, brown trout and cutlips minnow were the only common species. However, bluegill, eastern blacknose dace, longnose dace, and largemouth bass were all classified as "present" in the creek. Brown bullhead, flatnose minnow, and pumpkinseed were found to be rare.

The plant life around the Griffin Reservoir on Leggetts Creek includes various native trees and understory plants. From the reservoir downstream to an intake pond near Interstate 81, the creek's riparian buffer contains old growth forest, including tulip poplar trees. In addition to tulip popular, hemlock and pine also occur in the Griffin Mills reach of the creek. Near Leggetts Gap, the creek has some riparian buffering. Even in its lower reaches, it has a stable vegetative cover in some areas. However, other areas are full of invasive plants. Major invasive plant species include Japanese knotweed, Norway Maple, and Ailanthus. Overall, the riparian buffer of the creek mainly consists of grassland and forested land.

At three sites on Leggetts Creek, the EPT (Ephemeroptera, Plecoptera, and Trichoptera) Taxa Richness ranges from 4.00 to 6.00. The Total Taxa Richness ranges from 10.00 to 11.00. The Taxa Richness and the EPT Taxa Richness are the total number of macroinvertebrate taxa observed in a sample and the total number of those taxa that are in the three aforementioned orders, respectively. The Percent Intolerance Index ranges from 4.2% to 7.9% and the Beck's Index value ranges from 2.00 to 6.00. These two methods count individuals with PTVs of 0 to 3 and taxa with PTVs of 0 to 2, respectively. The Shannon Diversity Index value ranges from 0.70 to 2.01 and the Hilsenhoff Biotic Index value ranges from 1.24 to 2.85. The former is a method of determining community composition by considering both taxonomic richness and evenness of individuals. The latter is a count of individuals, weighted by pollution tolerance. The IBI Score of the creek ranges from 31.45 at site A2 to 43.39 at site D1. The habitat assessment result of the creek was an "optimal" 192 out of 200 on the reaches where it was analyzed.

== Recreation ==
A greenway and/or connecting trail along Leggetts Creek was proposed in the Lackawanna River Watershed Conservation Plan in the early 2000s. The greenway would be known as the Leggetts Creek greenway. It could link to the Lackawanna River Heritage Trail and could be extended to link to the Tunkhannock greenway. The South Abington Park and the Leggetts Creek Trail are in Chinchilla and the creek flows through the latter. Trestle Hole Park is also along the creek's lower reaches. The Dutch Gap Little League Field is located at Wells Street.

== See also ==
- Meadow Brook (Lackawanna River), next tributary of the Lackawanna River going downriver
- Price Creek (Pennsylvania), next tributary of the Lackawanna River going upriver
- List of rivers of Pennsylvania
- List of tributaries of the Lackawanna River
