= East Branch Field Brook =

Physical characteristics
- Source
  - location: unnamed lake in Lathrop Township, Susquehanna County, Pennsylvania
  - elevation: between 1,260 and 1,280 feet (384 and 390 m)
- Mouth
  - location: Field Brook in Nicholson Township, Wyoming County, Pennsylvania within a mile of Nicholson
  - coordinates: 41°38′02″N 75°48′54″W
  - elevation: 860 ft (260 m)
- Length: 3.7 mi (6.0 km)
- Basin size: 2.70 mi^{2} (7.0 km^{2})

Basin features
- Progression: Field Brook → Tunkhannock Creek → Susquehanna River → Chesapeake Bay
- Tributaries
  - left: one unnamed tributary

East Branch Field Brook is a tributary of Field Brook in Susquehanna County and Wyoming County, in Pennsylvania, in the United States. It is approximately 3.7 miles (6.0 km) long and flows through Lathrop Township in Susquehanna County and Nicholson Township in Wyoming County. The watershed of the stream has an area of 2.70 square miles (7.0 km^{2}). The stream is not designated as an impaired waterbody. It is a Coldwater Fishery and a Migratory Fishery.

== Course ==
East Branch Field Brook begins in an unnamed lake in Lathrop Township, Susquehanna County. It flows east-southeast for a few tenths of a mile before turning south-southeast for more than a mile as its valley becomes narrower. In this reach, it receives an unnamed tributary from the left and passes by Miller Hill. The stream then turns south for several tenths of a mile before turning south-southeast again. After a short distance, it exits Lathrop Township and Susquehanna County.

Upon exiting Susquehanna County, Eats Branch Field Brook continues flowing south-southeast. Its valley becomes shallower and several tenths of a mile further downstream, it reaches its confluence with Field Brook.

East Branch Field Brook joins Field Brook 1.48 miles (2.38 km) upstream of its mouth.

== Hydrology ==
East Branch Field Brook is not classified as an impaired waterbody.

An Erosion and Sediment Control permit has been issued to Williams Field Services Company, LLC, for which one of the receiving streams is East Branch Field Brook. Chief Gathering, LLC once requested a permit to construct and maintain a 6-inch (15 cm) pipeline for natural gas and a two timber mat bridges across the stream. One crossing would impact 65 feet (20 m) of the stream and the other would impact 102 feet (31 m).

== Geography and geology ==
The elevation near the mouth of East Branch Field Brook is 860 feet (260 m) above sea level. The elevation of the stream's source is between 1,260 and 1,280 feet (384 and 390 m) above sea level.

The surficial geology along the lower and middle reaches of East Branch Field Brook mainly consists of alluvium, while the rest of the stream's valley has surficial geology consisting of a till known as Wisconsinan Till. However, near the mouth of the stream, there is a patch of alluvial terrace. In the stream's upper reaches, the surficial geology mostly consists of Wisconsinan Till and a lake.

== Watershed and biology ==
The watershed of East Branch Field Brook has an area of 2.70 square miles (7.0 km^{2}). The stream is entirely within the United States Geological Survey quadrangle of Hop Bottom. The stream's mouth is within a mile (two kilometers) of Nicholson.

The designated use of East Branch Field Brook is aquatic life. The stream is classified as a Coldwater Fishery and a Migratory Fishery.

== History ==
East Branch Field Brook was entered into the Geographic Names Information System on August 2, 1979. Its identifier in the Geographic Names Information System is 1173743.

A bridge carrying State Route 2002 crosses East Branch Field Brook in Lathrop Township, Susquehanna County. A 1996 act authorized the rehabilitation of the bridge.

== See also ==
- List of rivers of Pennsylvania
