= Starkville, Pennsylvania =

Coordinates: 41°36′21″N 75°50′04″W

Starkville is a populated place in Wyoming County, Pennsylvania. It is located between Tunkhannock, PA and Nicholson, PA, just east of East Lemon, PA. It is named after the Stark Family, who were early residents of the area. There are 3 original Stark homes located on RT 92. There was also a roadhouse and gas station named Peggy's located on Rt 92, which is a private residence now. It is the home of a bridge on the National Register of Historic Places.

== Geography ==
The mouth of Monroe Creek, which flows into Tunkhannock Creek is in Starkville.
