= Horton Creek =

Horton Creek may refer to:

- Horton Creek (Arizona)
- Horton Creek (Oxbow Creek), in Pennsylvania
- Horton Creek (Tunkhannock Creek), in Pennsylvania
