= Field Brook =

Field Brook Fields Brook
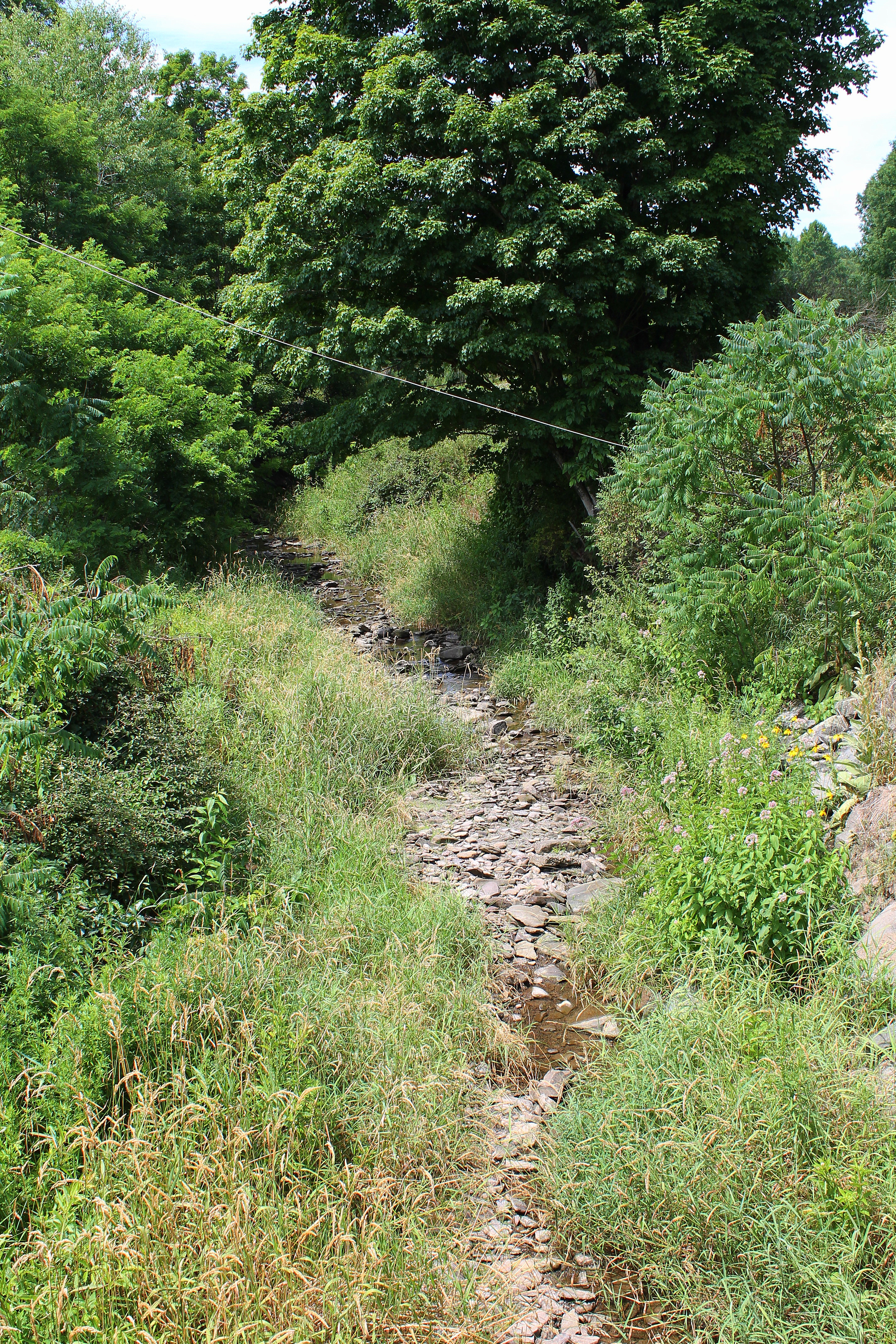
- Field Brook looking upstream

Physical characteristics
- Source
  - location: pond in Lathrop Township, Susquehanna County, Pennsylvania
  - elevation: between 1,320 and 1,340 feet (402 and 408 m)
- Mouth
  - location: Tunkhannock Creek in Nicholson Township, Wyoming County, Pennsylvania
  - coordinates: 41°36′52″N 75°48′50″W
  - elevation: 702 ft (214 m)
- Length: 5.8 mi (9.3 km)
- Basin size: 7.41 mi^{2} (19.2 km^{2})

Basin features
- Progression: Tunkhannock Creek → Susquehanna River → Chesapeake Bay
- Tributaries
  - left: East Branch Field Brook

Field Brook (also known as Fields Brook) is a tributary of Tunkhannock Creek in Susquehanna County and Wyoming County, in Pennsylvania, in the United States. It is approximately 5.8 miles (9.3 km) long and flows through Lathrop Township in Susquehanna County and Nicholson Township in Wyoming County. The watershed of the stream has an area of 7.41 square miles (19.2 km^{2}). The stream has one named tributary, which is known as East Branch Field Brook. The surficial geology in the vicinity of Field Brook consists of alluvium, Wisconsinan Till, alluvial terrace, alluvial fan, bedrock, wetlands, and a lake. The watershed of the stream is designated as a Coldwater Fishery and a Migratory Fishery.

== Course ==
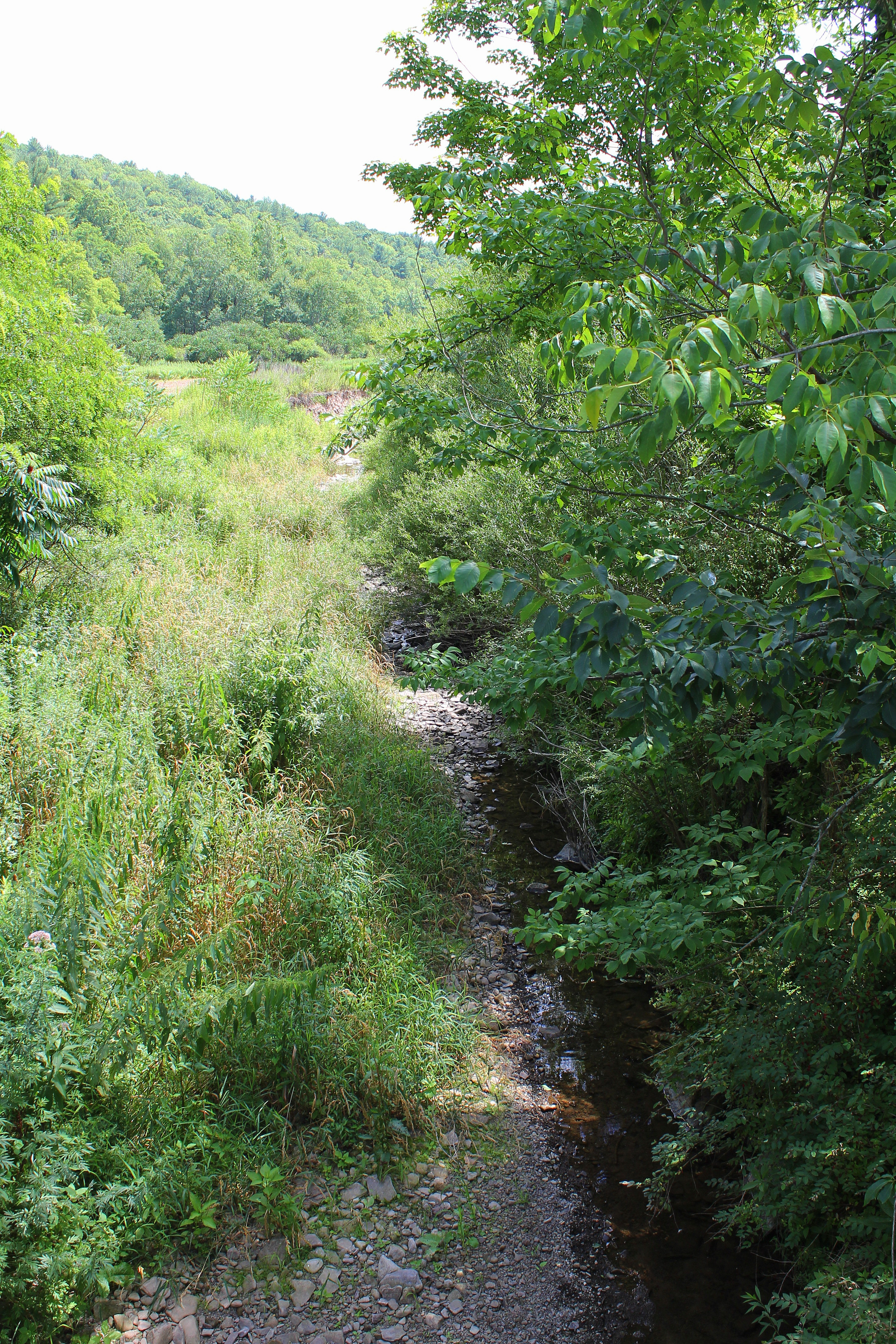
Field Brook looking downstream

Field Brook begins in a pond in Lathrop Township, Susquehanna County. It flows south and south-southeast for a few tenths of a mile before turning southwest and entering a lake. The stream then turns south-southeast for more than a mile, flowing through a valley and passing Miller Hill and Mulligan Hill. It then turns south for several tenths of a mile before turning southeast for several tenths of a mile. At this point, the stream exits Lathrop Township and Susquehanna County.

Upon exiting Susquehanna County, Field Brook enters Nicholson Township, Wyoming County and continues flowing southeast. After several tenths of a mile, it receives East Branch Field Brook, its only named tributary, from the left, and turns south-southeast. After more than a mile, the stream's valley broadens and it turns south-southwest, crossing Pennsylvania Route 92. The stream then turns southeast and then east, after a short distance reaching its confluence with Tunkhannock Creek.

Field Brook joins Tunkhannock Creek 13.12 miles (21.11 km) upstream of its mouth.

=== Tributaries ===
Field Brook has one named tributary: East Branch Field Brook. East Branch Field Brook joins Field Brook 1.48 miles (2.38 km) upstream of its mouth and drains an area of 2.70 square miles (7.0 km^{2}).

== Geography and geology ==
The elevation near the mouth of Field Brook is 702 feet (214 m) above sea level. The elevation of the stream's source is between 1,320 and 1,340 feet (402 and 408 m) above sea level.

The surficial geology near the mouth of Field Brook consists mostly of alluvium, but there is some till known as Wisconsinan Till in this reach as well. In the stream's middle reaches, the surficial geology alongside it consists mostly of alluvium, while the rest of the valley is mostly Wisconsinan Till. There are also patches of alluvial fan, alluvial terrace, and bedrock consisting of sandstone and shale. In the upper reaches, the surficial geology is mostly Wisconsinan Till, but there is a patch of alluvium, wetlands, and a lake.

== Watershed ==
The watershed of Field Brook has an area of 7.41 square miles (19.2 km^{2}). The mouth of the stream is in the United States Geological Survey quadrangle of Factoryville. However, its source is in the quadrangle of Hop Bottom. The mouth of the stream is within a mile of Nicholson.

As of 2015, a dam known as the McNamara Dam is located on a tributary of Field Brook. It is considered to pose a threat to public safety, so there has been a proposal to remove the dam, causing 900 feet (270 m) of stream to flow freely again.

== History ==
Field Brook was entered into the Geographic Names Information System on August 2, 1979. Its identifier in the Geographic Names Information System is 1174737. The stream is also known as Fields Brook. This variant name appears in Israel C. White's 1883 book The geology of the North Branch Susquehanna River Region in the six counties of Wyoming, Lackawanna, Luzerne, Columbia, Montour and Northumberland.

A concrete tee beam bridge carrying Pennsylvania Route 92 over Field Brook was built in 1927 in Nicholson Township, Wyoming County and is 34.1 feet (10.4 m) long. A steel stringer/multi-beam or girder bridge carrying State Route 1015 over the stream was built in 1941 in Nicholson Township, Wyoming County and is 34.1 feet (10.4 m) long.

== Biology ==
The drainage basin of Field Brook is designated as a Coldwater Fishery and a Migratory Fishery.

== See also ==
- Monroe Creek (Tunkhannock Creek), next tributary of Tunkhannock Creek going downstream
- Horton Creek (Tunkhannock Creek), next tributary of Tunkhannock Creek going upstream
- List of rivers of Pennsylvania
