= Horton Creek (Oxbow Creek tributary) =

Physical characteristics
- Source
  - location: wetland in Springville Township, Susquehanna County, Pennsylvania
  - elevation: between 1,120 and 1,140 feet (341 and 347 m)
- Mouth
  - location: Oxbow Creek close to St. Andrews Camp in Lemon Township, Wyoming County, Pennsylvania
  - coordinates: 41°36′15″N 75°52′39″W
  - elevation: 860 ft (260 m)
- Basin size: 3.60 mi^{2} (9.3 km^{2})

Basin features
- Progression: Oxbow Creek → Tunkhannock Creek → Susquehanna River → Chesapeake Bay

Horton Creek is a tributary of Oxbow Creek in Susquehanna County and Wyoming County, in Pennsylvania, in the United States. It is approximately 3.3 miles (5.3 km) long and flows through Springville Township in Susquehanna County and Lemon Township and Nicholson Township in Wyoming County. The watershed of the creek has an area of 3.60 square miles (9.3 km^{2}). The creek is not designated as an impaired waterbody. The surficial geology in its vicinity mainly consists of alluvium, Wisconsinan Till, Wisconsinan Ice-Contact Stratified Drift, alluvial terrace, and wetlands.

== Course ==
Horton Creek begins in a wetland in Springville Township, Susquehanna County. It flows south-southeast for a short distance, entering a lake and exiting Springville Township and Susquehanna County.

Upon exiting Susquehanna County, Horton Creek enters Wyoming County and flows along the border between Lemon Township and Nicholson Township. From the southern end of the lake, the creek flows south for several tenths of a mile before turning south-southeast. Over the next several tenths of a mile, it flows through a valley, passing Seely Hill and Vargo Hill. The creek then turns south-southwest for several tenths of a mile, leaving the township line and entering Lemon Township. It then turns south-southeast for several tenths of a mile before reaching the end of its valley and turning east-southeast for a short distance. At this point, the creek turns south-southwest and reaches its confluence with Oxbow Creek.

Horton Creek joins Oxbow Creek 1.50 miles (2.41 km) upstream of its mouth.

== Hydrology ==
Horton Creek is not designated as an impaired waterbody.

== Geography and geology ==
The elevation near the mouth of Horton Creek is 860 feet (260 m) above sea level. The elevation of the creek's source is between 1,120 and 1,140 feet (341 and 347 m) above sea level.

The surficial geology along the lower reaches of Horton Creek mainly consists of alluvium. However, a till known as Wisconsinan Till lines the creek's valley. There are also patches of alluvial terrace and Wisconsinan Ice-Contact Stratified Drift near its mouth. In the creek's upper reaches, the surficial geology immediately adjacent to the creek is also alluvium, while the surficial geology in most of the rest of the valley is Wisconsinan Till. There are also two wetland patches near the creek in this reach.

== Watershed ==
The watershed of Horton Creek has an area of 3.60 square miles (9.3 km^{2}). The mouth of the creek is in the United States Geological Survey quadrangle of Tunkhannock. However, its source is in the quadrangle of Springville. The mouth of the creek is located close to St. Andrews Camp.

== History ==
Horton Creek was entered into the Geographic Names Information System on August 2, 1979. Its identifier in the Geographic Names Information System is 1177475.

A 2004 act authorized a $260,000 bridge replacement of a bridge carrying State Route 1008 over Horton Creek in Lemon Township, Wyoming County.

== See also ==
- Oxbow Inlet, next tributary of Oxbow Creek going upstream
- List of rivers of Pennsylvania
