= Bridge in Gibson Borough =

- U.S. National Register of Historic Places
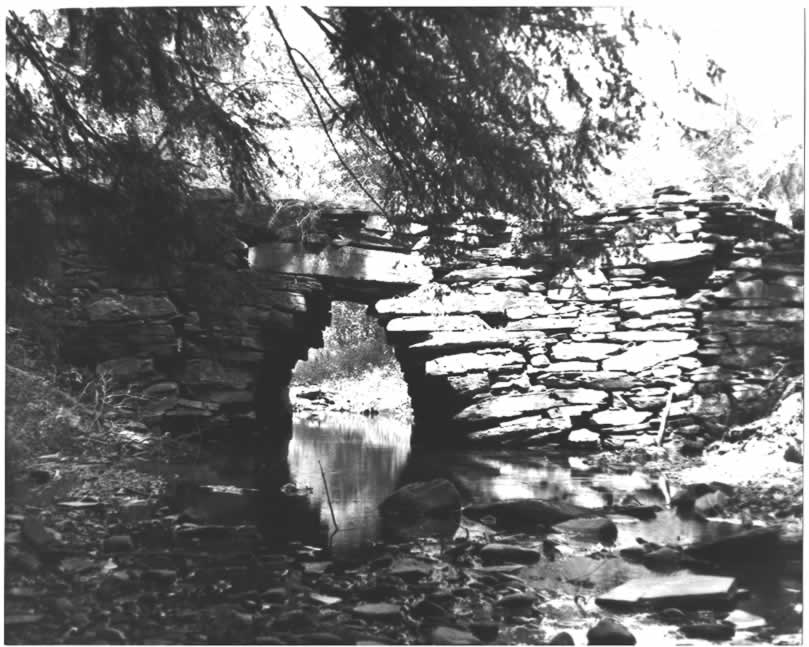

- Location within Pennsylvania Location within the United States
- Nearest city: South Gibson, Pennsylvania
- Coordinates: 41°44′32″N 75°37′51″W
- Area: less than one acre
- Architectural style: Primitive corbelled arch
- MPS: Highway Bridges Owned by the Commonwealth of Pennsylvania, Department of Transportation TR
- NRHP reference No.: 88000839
- Added to NRHP: June 22, 1988

The Bridge in Gibson Borough near South Gibson, Pennsylvania was a stone false arch bridge over Bell Creek, north of its confluence with Tunkhannock Creek. It was constructed sometime between 1750 and 1824 and listed on the National Register of Historic Places in 1988.

The bridge was a type of false arch clapper bridge or stone slab bridge on corbelled stone supports. From the corners of the wing walls it measured 58 by 25 feet.

It was located in Gibson Township, Susquehanna County, Pennsylvania north of the unincorporated town of South Gibson. The meaning of "Gibson Borough" in the National Register listing is unclear.

The bridge was reported as "demolished" to the Pennsylvania Historical and Museum Commission in December 2015.
