= Oxbow Inlet =

Physical characteristics
- Source
  - location: wetland in Lemon Township, Wyoming County, Pennsylvania
  - elevation: between 1,120 and 1,140 feet (341 and 347 m)
- Mouth
  - location: Oxbow Lake in Lemon Township, Wyoming County, Pennsylvania
  - coordinates: 41°36′36″N 75°53′50″W
  - elevation: 1,027 ft (313 m)
- Length: 1.5 mi (2.4 km)
- Basin size: 1.79 sq mi (4.6 km^{2})

Basin features
- Progression: Oxbow Creek → Tunkhannock Creek → Susquehanna River → Chesapeake Bay

Oxbow Inlet is a tributary of Oxbow Creek in Wyoming County, Pennsylvania, in the United States. It is approximately 1.5 miles (2.4 km) long and flows through Lemon Township. The watershed of the creek has an area of 1.79 square miles (4.6 km^{2}). The stream is classified as a Coldwater Fishery and a Migratory Fishery. The surficial geology in the vicinity of its lower reaches mostly consists of alluvium and Wisconsinan Till, but there are patches of alluvial fan and bedrock nearby as well.

== Course ==
Oxbow Inlet begins in a wetland in Lemon Township. It flows south for several tenths of a mile, its valley briefly deepening, before turning southeast and then south-southeast for several tenths of a mile as its valley becomes shallower. The stream then reaches its mouth at Oxbow Lake, from which Oxbow Creek flows.

Oxbow Inlet joins Oxbow Creek 2.79 miles (4.49 km) upstream of its mouth.

== Hydrology ==
In 1966, the concentration of silica in the waters of Oxbow Inlet was found to be greater than 50 milligrams per liter (0.050 oz/cu ft). The iron concentration in the stream was found to be 0.20 milligrams per liter (0.00020 oz/cu ft). The magnesium and calcium concentrations were 2.02 and 24.64 milligrams per liter (0.00202 and 0.02461 oz/cu ft), respectively. The sulfate concentration was 11.08 milligrams per liter (0.01107 oz/cu ft). The iron, calcium, and sulfate concentrations were below average for springs sampled in a 1966 study of bodies of water in the Wilkes-Barre area. However, the silica and magnesium concentrations were above average.

In the summer of 1966, Oxbow Inlet carried only vadose water, due to drought conditions during that time period.

== Geography and geology ==
The elevation near the mouth of Oxbow Inlet is 1,027 feet (313 m) above sea level. The elevation of the stream's source is between 1,120 and 1,140 feet (341 and 347 m) above sea level.

Oxbow Inlet is the inlet to Oxbow Lake, which does not appear to have any springs in its vicinity.

The surficial geology in the immediate vicinity of the lower reaches of Oxbow Inlet mainly consists of alluvium. Slightly further upstream (and slightly further away in the lower reaches), there is a till known as Wisconsinan Till in the surficial geology. There are also patches of alluvial fan and bedrock consisting of sandstone and shale nearby.

== Watershed and biology ==
The watershed of Oxbow Inlet has an area of 1.79 square miles (4.6 km^{2}). The mouth of the stream is in the United States Geological Survey quadrangle of Tunkhannock. However, its source is in the quadrangle of Springville. The stream's mouth is located within 1 mile (1.6 km) of St. Andrews Camp.

Chief Oil & Gas, LLC has an Erosion and Sediment Control permit for which one of the receiving streams is Oxbow Inlet.

Oxbow Inlet is classified as a Coldwater Fishery and a Migratory Fishery.

== History ==
Oxbow Inlet was entered into the Geographic Names Information System on August 2, 1979. Its identifier in the Geographic Names Information System is 1193074.

== See also ==
- Horton Creek (Oxbow Creek), next tributary of Oxbow Creek going downstream
- List of rivers of Pennsylvania
