= Lemon Township =

Lemon Township may refer to the following townships in the United States:

- Lemon Township, Butler County, Ohio,
- Lemon Township, Wyoming County, Pennsylvania
