= Monroe Creek (Tunkhannock Creek tributary) =

Monroe Creek Bartholomew Creek
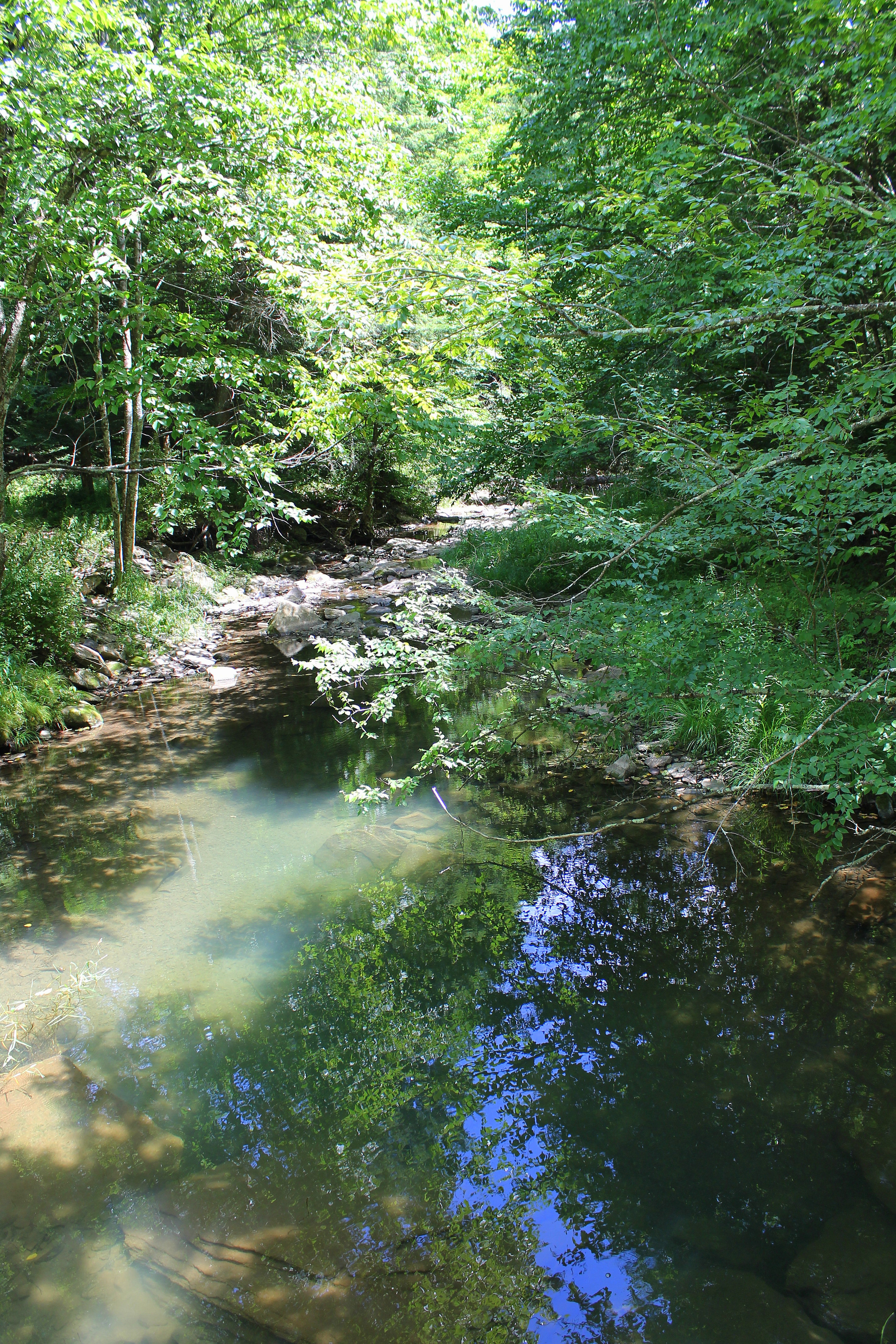
- Monroe Creek looking downstream

Physical characteristics
- Source
  - location: pond or small lake in Springville Township, Susquehanna County, Pennsylvania
  - elevation: between 1,320 and 1,340 feet (402 and 408 m)
- Mouth
  - location: Tunkhannock Creek in Nicholson Township, Wyoming County, Pennsylvania at Starkville
  - coordinates: 41°36′16″N 75°49′59″W
  - elevation: 686 ft (209 m)
- Length: 6.1 mi (9.8 km)
- Basin size: 6.64 mi^{2} (17.2 km^{2})

Basin features
- Progression: Tunkhannock Creek → Susquehanna River → Chesapeake Bay
- Tributaries
  - left: two unnamed tributaries
  - right: two unnamed tributaries

Monroe Creek (also known as Bartholomew Creek) is a tributary of Tunkhannock Creek in Susquehanna County and Wyoming County, in Pennsylvania, in the United States. It is approximately 6.1 miles (9.8 km) long and flows through Springville Township in Susquehanna County and Nicholson Township in Wyoming County. The watershed of the creek has an area of 6.64 square miles (17.2 km^{2}). The creek is not designated as an impaired waterbody. The surficial geology in its vicinity consists mostly of alluvium, Wisconsinan Till, and other things. Its watershed is designated as a Coldwater Fishery and a Migratory Fishery.

== Course ==
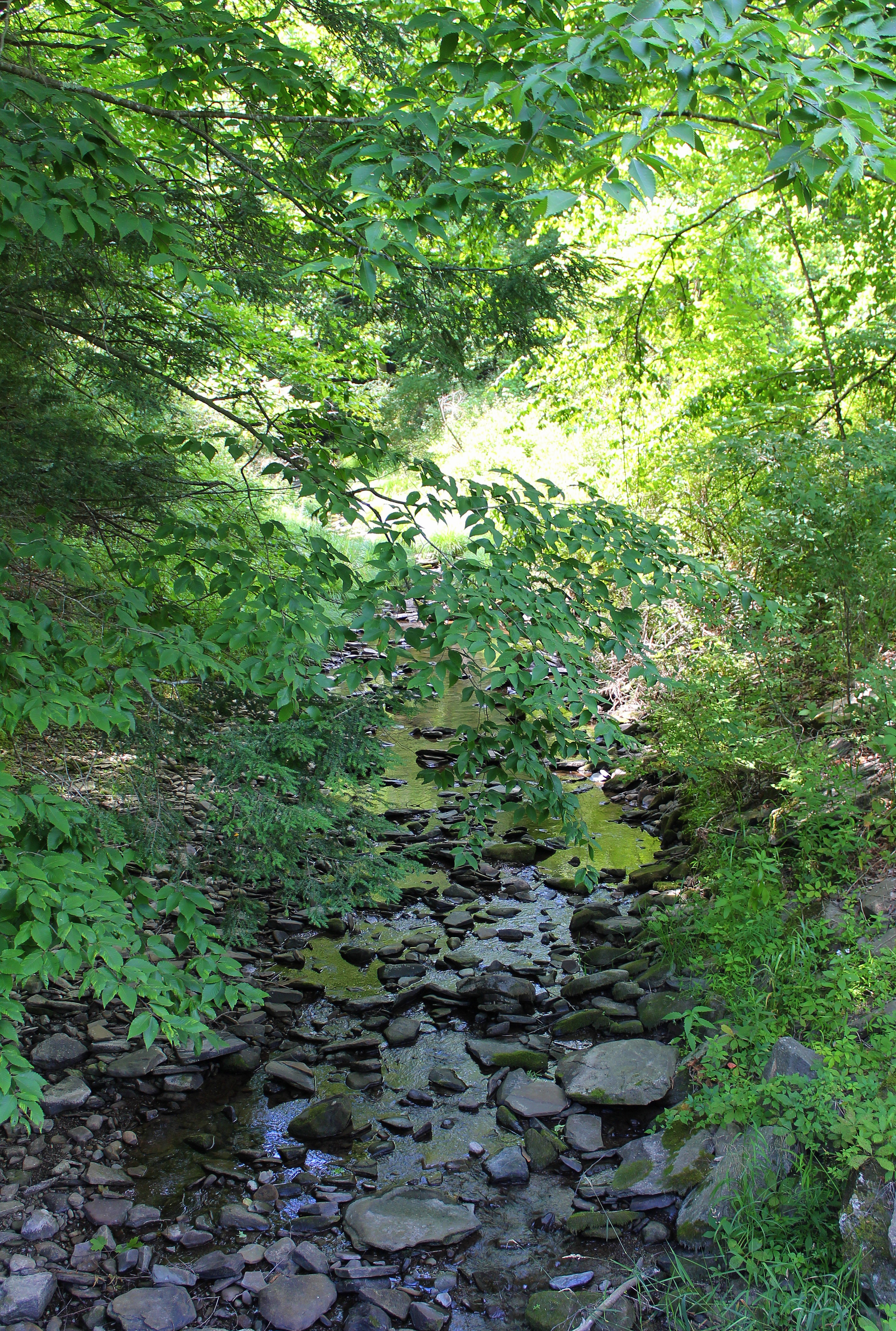
Monroe Creek looking upstream

Monroe Creek begins in a pond or small lake in Springville Township, Susquehanna County. It flows south-southeast for several tenths of a mile before turning southwest and passing through a wetland. The creek then turns south for more than a mile, passing through another wetland and entering Nicholson Township, Wyoming County. Here, it turns south-southeast and receives two unnamed tributaries from the right. After several tenths of a mile, it passes Pompey Hill and Dam Hill before turning east and then south-southeast for a few miles. In this reach, the creek receives two unnamed tributaries from the left. It then turns south for several tenths of a mile, leaves its valley, crosses Pennsylvania Route 92, and reaches its confluence with Tunkhannock Creek.

Monroe Creek joins Tunkhannock Creek 11.38 miles (18.31 km) upstream of its mouth.

== Hydrology ==
Monroe Creek is not designated as an impaired waterbody.

== Geography and geology ==
The elevation near the mouth of Monroe Creek is 686 feet (209 m) above sea level. The elevation of the creek's source is between 1,320 and 1,340 feet (402 and 408 m) above sea level.

The surficial geology near the mouth of Monroe Creek mainly consists of alluvium and alluvial terrace. Further upstream, it consists of alluvium and a till known as Wisconsinan Till, although bedrock consisting of sandstone and shale occurs in the surficial geology on some nearby hills. Further upstream, the surficial geology is fairly similar, but there is a patch of alluvial fan and a wetland near the creek just north of the Susquehanna County line. In the creek's upper reaches, the surficial geology consists of Wisconsinan Till, except for a wetland at the headwaters.

== Watershed ==
The watershed of Monroe Creek has an area of 6.64 square miles (17.2 km^{2}). The mouth of the creek is in the United States Geological Survey quadrangle of Factoryville. However, its source is in the quadrangle of Hop Bottom. The creek's mouth is located at Starkville.

The designated use for Monroe Creek is aquatic life. In 2006, the creek was a proposed flood debris cleanup site.

== History ==
Monroe Creek was entered into the Geographic Names Information System on August 2, 1979. Its identifier in the Geographic Names Information System is 1192954. The creek is also known as Bartholomew Creek. This variant name appears in Israel C. White's 1883 book The geology of the North Branch Susquehanna River Region in the six counties of Wyoming, Lackawanna, Luzerne, Columbia, Montour and Northumberland.

A concrete tee beam bridge carrying Pennsylvania Route 92 over Monroe Creek was built in Nicholson Township, Wyoming County in 1931 and is 30.8 feet (9.4 m) long. This bridge is structurally deficient, as of 2013.

== Biology ==
The drainage basin of Monroe Creek is designated as a Coldwater Fishery and a Migratory Fishery.

== See also ==
- Oxbow Creek, next tributary of Tunkhannock Creek going downstream
- Field Brook, next tributary of Tunkhannock Creek going upstream
- List of rivers of Pennsylvania
