= Horton Creek (Tunkhannock Creek tributary) =

River in Pennsylvania, United States

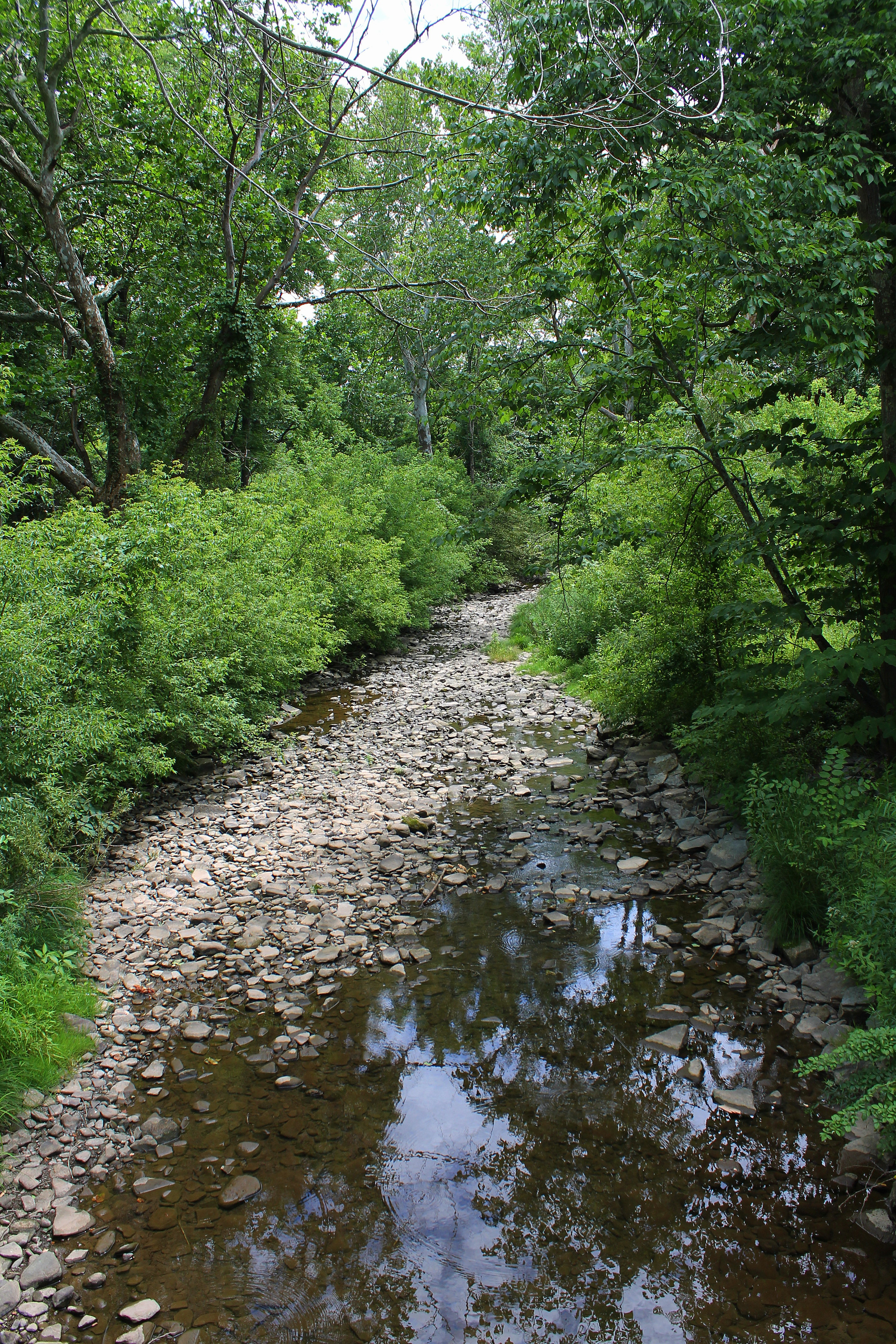
- Horton Creek looking downstream

Physical characteristics
- Source
  - location: pond in Brooklyn Township, Susquehanna County, Pennsylvania
  - elevation: between 1,480 and 1,500 feet (451 and 457 m)
- Mouth
  - location: Tunkhannock Creek in Nicholson, Wyoming County, Pennsylvania
  - coordinates: 41°37′02″N 75°47′39″W
  - elevation: 715 ft (218 m)
- Length: 11 mi (18 km)
- Basin size: 16.9 mi^{2} (44 km^{2})

Basin features
- Progression: Tunkhannock Creek → Susquehanna River → Chesapeake Bay
- Tributaries
  - left: two unnamed tributaries
  - right: five unnamed tributaries

Horton Creek is a tributary of Tunkhannock Creek in Susquehanna County and Wyoming County, in Pennsylvania, in the United States. It is approximately 11 miles (18 km) long and flows through Brooklyn Township and Lathrop Township in Susquehanna County and Nicholson Township and Nicholson in Wyoming County. The watershed of the creek has an area of 16.9 square miles (44 km^{2}). The creek is not designated as an impaired waterbody and has no named tributaries. The topography of the creek's watershed has been described as "rough and hilly" and its channel is sinuous.

The watershed of Horton Creek is largely rural and sparsely developed. There are several lakes and a swamp in the creek's watershed. The watershed is mostly located in northeastern Wyoming County and southern Susquehanna County. The area in the creek's vicinity was settled by the 1810s. In the early 1900s, major industries included quarries, sawmills, and agriculture. The creek itself was also used as a water supply. The watershed of Horton Creek is designated as a Coldwater Fishery and a Migratory Fishery and has been stocked with trout.

== Course ==
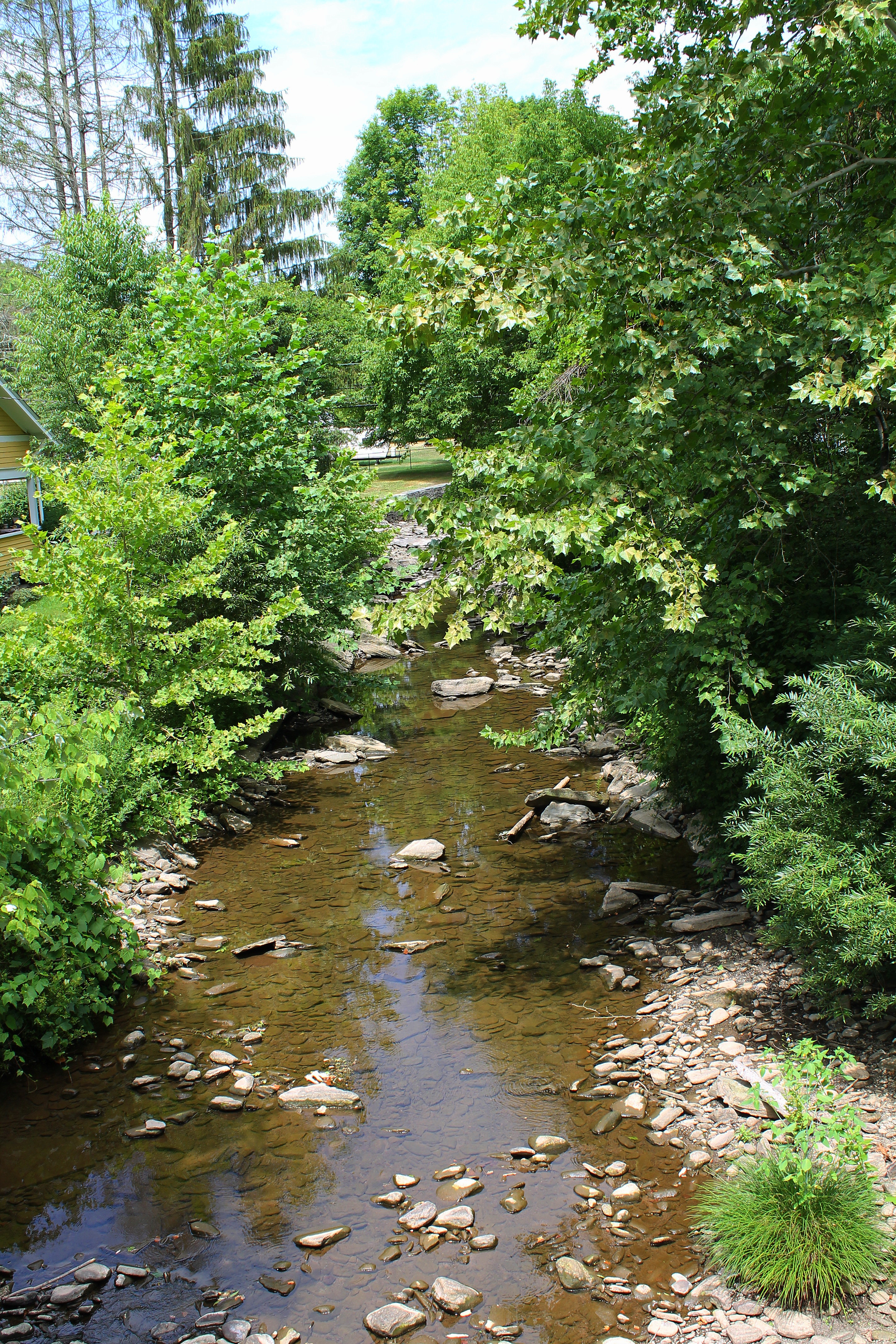
Horton Creek looking upstream

Horton Creek begins in a pond in Brooklyn Township, Susquehanna County. It flows south for several tenths of a mile, crossing Pennsylvania Route 167, before turning south-southeast and receiving an unnamed tributary from the right. The creek then continues flowing south-southeast for more than a mile, passing through a pond and a wetland and receiving an unnamed tributary from the left. The creek then turns south for several tenths of a mile, passing through two more wetlands and receiving an unnamed tributary from the right. It also enters Lathrop Township in this reach. It then turns south-southeast for several tenths of a mile and receives an unnamed tributary from the right before turning south-southwest. After several tenths of a mile, it receives another unnamed tributary from the right, turns southeast, receives an unnamed tributary from the left, and heading in a southerly direction for a few miles. In this reach, it receives an unnamed tributary from the right. The creek then exits Lathrop Township and Susquehanna County.

Upon exiting Susquehanna County, Horton Creek enters Nicholson Township, Wyoming County. It flows south-southeast and then south, briefly flowing along the border between Nicholson Township and Nicholson. The creek then turns south, entering Nicholson. Several tenths of a mile further downstream, it reaches the end of its valley, crosses Pennsylvania Route 92, and reaches its confluence with Tunkhannock Creek.

Horton Creek joins Tunkhannock Creek 14.42 miles (23.21 km) upstream of its mouth.

== Hydrology and climate ==
Horton Creek is not designated as an impaired waterbody.

The average annual rate of precipitation in the watershed of Horton Creek is 35 to 40 inches (89 to 102 cm).

== Geography and geology ==
The elevation near the mouth of Horton Creek is 715 feet (218 m) above sea level. The elevation of the creek's source is between 1,480 and 1,500 feet (451 and 457 m) above sea level.

The surficial geology near the mouth of Horton Creek mainly consists of alluvium and a till known as Wisconsinan Till. However, there is also an area of Wisconsinan Outwash nearby. The surficial geology immediately adjacent to the creek mostly consists of alluvium. However, much of the rest of the valley has surficial geology consisting of Wisconsinan Till. There are also a few patches of alluvial terrace, alluvial fan, wetlands, peat bogs, and bedrock consisting of sandstone and shale. There are also two small sandstone quarry dump patches, consisting of chunks of broken sandstone.

The topography of the watershed of Horton Creek is described as "rough and hilly" in a 1921 book. The valley of the creek is relatively narrow and is surrounded by hills that have been rounded due to glaciation.

The channel of Horton Creek is sinuous and flows through glacial drift and a rock formation consisting of sandstone.

== Watershed ==
The watershed of Horton Creek has an area of 16.9 square miles (44 km^{2}). The mouth of the creek is in the United States Geological Survey quadrangle of Factoryville. However, its source is in the quadrangle of Hop Bottom. The creek's mouth is located at Nicholson.

The watershed of Horton Creek is mainly located in northeastern Wyoming County and southern Susquehanna County. The watershed is mainly rural and sparsely populated. Lakes in the creek's watershed include Lakeside Pond and Lord Pond, whose areas are 49.9 and 32.0 acres (20.2 and 12.9 ha), respectively. Other lakes and swamps in the watershed include Mud Pond, Holley Pond, Kinney Swamp, and numerous other, unnamed ponds.

The designated use for Horton Creek is aquatic life. Williams Field Services Company, LLC once received an Erosion and Sediment Control permit for which the receiving waterbodies were Horton Creek, Meshoppen Creek, and some of their unnamed tributaries. Cabot Oil & Gas Corp once received another such permit, for which the receiving waterbodies were unnamed tributaries of Horton Creek. PVR NEPA Gas Gathering, LLC also once received a permit to construct a natural gas pipeline, and for the construction to impact 61.0 feet (18.6 m) of the creek and 62.0 feet (18.9 m) of one of its unnamed tributaries. Additionally, Chesapeake Appalachia, LLC has an Erosion and Sediment Control permit for which the receiving waterbodies are Horton Creek and Tunkhannock Creek.

== History and recreation ==
Horton Creek was entered into the Geographic Names Information System on August 2, 1979 as part of the Geographic Names Phase I data compilation. Its identifier in the Geographic Names Information System is 1192044.

Elisha Smith, Josiah Pratt, and their families settled on Horton Creek near Josiah Lord in 1811. Levi Phelps cleared out a farm near the creek in 1812. The creek's valley was once a candidate for the construction of a railroad through it.

In the early 1900s, the main industries in the watershed of Horton Creek were quarries, sawmills, and agriculture. The creek was also used as a water supply at Nicholson. Major communities in the creek's watershed during this time period were Lindaville (46 people) and Lathrop (33 people). In the early 1900s, the Nicholson Water Company had an intake reservoir on the creek. During this time period, the creek was prone to pollution from various causes and typhoid was observed in its watershed. The creek was being used as a water supply as late as the 1950s. In 1959, the state's Water and Power Resources Board gave the Nicholson Borough Authority approval to withdraw up to 225,000 gallons from the creek; previously the limit was 110,000 gallons.

A concrete stringer/multi-beam or girder bridge carrying State Route 2096 over Horton Creek was constructed in 1940 in Lathrop Township, Susquehanna County and is 26.9 feet (8.2 m) long. A concrete tee beam bridge carrying State Route 2002 was constructed over the creek in 1961 in Lathrop Township, Susquehanna County and is 35.1 feet (10.7 m) long. A prestressed box beam or girders bridge carrying State Route 3023 over the creek was built in 1961 in Lathrop Township, Susquehanna County and is 43.0 feet (13.1 m) long. A prestressed box beam or girders bridge carrying Pennsylvania Route 92 over Horton Creek was built in Nicholson, Wyoming County in 1969 and is 47.9 feet (14.6 m) long.

Horton Creek was described as an "excellent" site for angling in the Tunkhannock Creek Conservation Plan in 1998.

== Biology ==
The drainage basin of Horton Creek is designated as a Coldwater Fishery and a Migratory Fishery. The creek has been stocked with trout. In 2014, it was stocked with rainbow trout from State Route 3023 downstream to its mouth.

== See also ==
- Field Brook, next tributary of Tunkhannock Creek going downstream
- Martins Creek (Tunkhannock Creek), next tributary of Tunkhannock Creek going upstream
- List of rivers of Pennsylvania
