= Nicholson Township, Pennsylvania =

Nicholson Township is the name of some places in the U.S. state of Pennsylvania:

- Nicholson Township, Fayette County, Pennsylvania
- Nicholson Township, Wyoming County, Pennsylvania
