= Oxbow Creek =

Oxbow Creek Hortons Creek
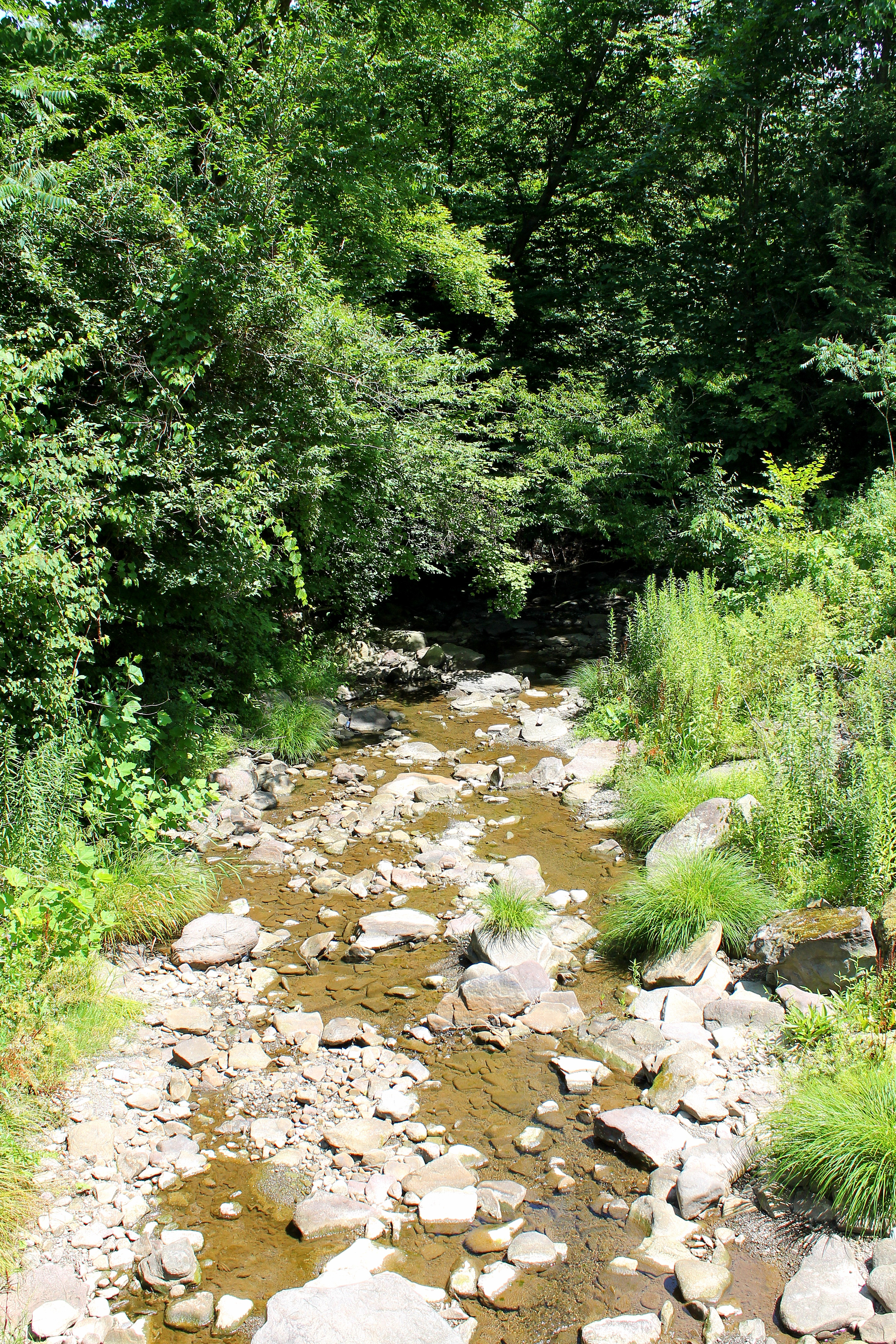
- Oxbow Creek looking downstream

Physical characteristics
- Source
  - location: Oxbow Lake in Lemon Township, Wyoming County, Pennsylvania
  - elevation: between 1,040 and 1,060 feet (317 and 323 m)
- Mouth
  - location: Tunkhannock Creek in Lemon Township, Wyoming County, Pennsylvania at East Lemon
  - coordinates: 41°35′15″N 75°51′41″W
  - elevation: 650 ft (200 m)
- Length: 2.5 mi (4.0 km)
- Basin size: 8.56 mi^{2} (22.2 km^{2})

Basin features
- Progression: Tunkhannock Creek → Susquehanna River → Chesapeake Bay
- Tributaries
  - left: Horton Creek
- Other tributaries: Oxbow Inlet

Oxbow Creek (also known as Hortons Creek) is a tributary of Tunkhannock Creek in Wyoming County, Pennsylvania, in the United States. It is approximately 2.5 miles (4.0 km) long and flows through Lemon Township. The watershed of the creek has an area of 8.56 square miles (22.2 km^{2}). The creek has two named tributarie: Horton Creek and Oxbow Inlet. It is not designated as an impaired waterbody. The surficial geology in its vicinity mostly consists of Wisconsinan Till, alluvium, Wisconsinan Ice-Contact Stratified Drift, and bedrock.

The area near the mouth of Oxbow Creek was settled before 1800 and some mills were constructed on it in the 19th century. A number of bridges have also been constructed across the creek. Its watershed is designated as a Coldwater Fishery and a Migratory Fishery.

== Course ==
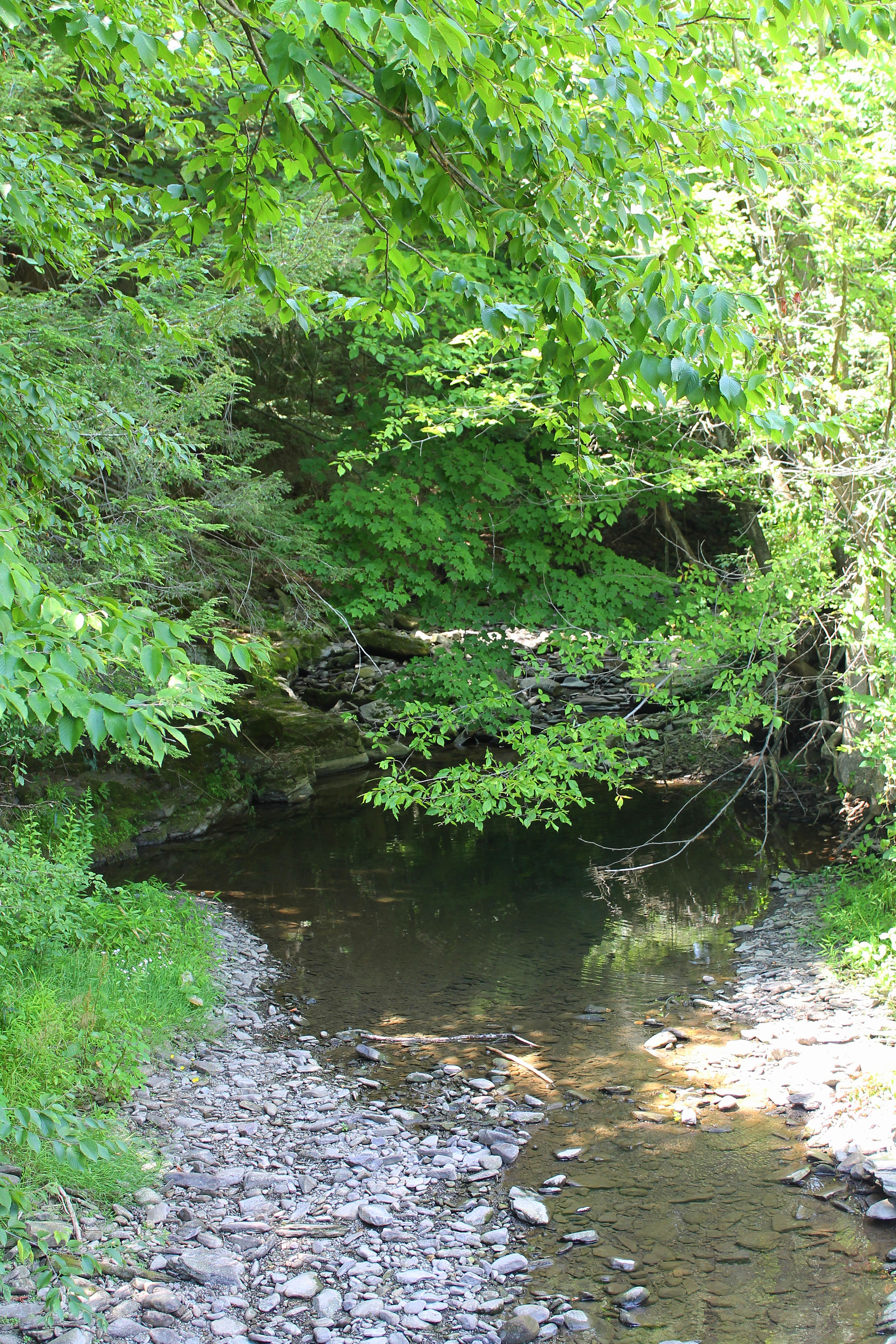
Oxbow Creek looking upstream

Oxbow Creek begins in Oxbow Lake, which the tributary Oxbow Inlet flows into, in Lemon Township. The creek flows east and then south for a few tenths of a mile, entering a valley. It then turns east for several tenths of a mile, flowing through the valley, before receiving the tributary Horton Creek from the left. At this point, the creek turns south-southeast for several tenths of a mile before turning south. After a few tenths of a mile, it turns southeast for a short distance, crossing Pennsylvania Route 92 and reaching its confluence with Tunkhannock Creek.

Oxbow Creek joins Tunkhannock Creek 8.70 miles (14.00 km) upstream of its mouth.

=== Tributaries ===
Oxbow Creek has two named tributaries: Oxbow Inlet and Horton Creek. Oxbow Inlet joins Oxbow Creek 2.79 miles (4.49 km) upstream of its mouth, at St. Andrews Camp, and drains an area of 1.79 square miles (4.6 km^{2}). Horton Creek joins Oxbow Creek 1.50 miles (2.41 km) upstream of its mouth, close to St. Andrews Camp, and drains an area of 3.60 square miles (9.3 km^{2}).

== Hydrology ==
Oxbow Creek is not designated as an impaired waterbody.

== Geography and geology ==
The elevation near the mouth of Oxbow Creek is 650 feet (200 m) above sea level. The elevation of the creek's source is between 1,040 and 1,060 feet (317 and 323 m) above sea level.

The surficial geology near the mouth of Oxbow Creek mainly consists of alluvium. Slightly further upstream, there is still some alluvium, but also a till known as Wisconsinan Till, and bedrock consisting of sandstone and shale. In the vicinity of the creek's upper reaches, the surficial geology mainly consists of Wisconsinan Till, although there is some alluvium and a patch of Wisconsinan Ice-Contact Stratified Drift near the confluence of the tributary Horton Creek.

== Watershed ==
The watershed of Oxbow Creek has an area of 8.56 square miles (22.2 km^{2}). The mouth of the creek is in the United States Geological Survey quadrangle of Factoryville. However, its source is in the quadrangle of Tunkhannock. The mouth of the creek is located at East Lemon.

The designated use of Oxbow Creek is aquatic life.

In August and September 2011, Oxbow Creek experienced significant flooding, which caused streambank erosion. To protect against such occurrences in the future, large rocks of riprap were installed along that reach of the creek.

== History ==
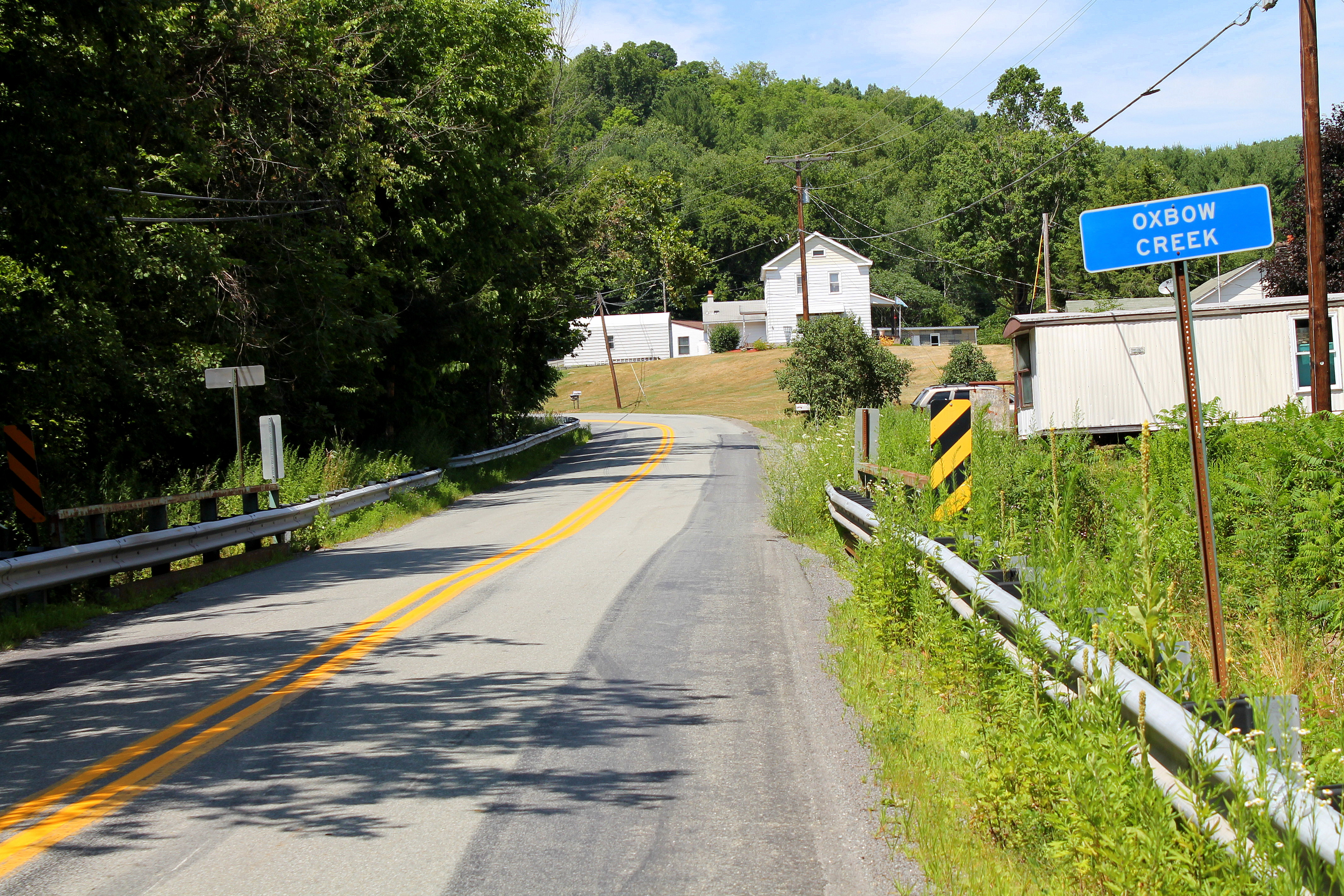
Bridge crossing Oxbow Creek

Oxbow Creek was entered into the Geographic Names Information System on August 2, 1979. Its identifier in the Geographic Names Information System is 1193074. The creek is also known as Hortons Creek. This variant name appears in Israel C. White's 1883 book The geology of the North Branch Susquehanna River Region in the six counties of Wyoming, Lackawanna, Luzerne, Columbia, Montour and Northumberland.

The early settlers in Lemon Township were people who came from Orange County, New York before 1800 to the mouth of Oxbow Creek. A number of sawmills were constructed on the creek in the 1800s. However, in 1868, heavy rains destroyed most of the mill dams on the creek. In 1879, W.S. Shaw constructed a circular saw and lath mill on the creek.

Three bridges carrying State Route 1009 over Oxbow Creek were built in Lemon Township in 1948; two are steel stringer/multi-beam or girder bridges and one is a concrete culvert bridge. Their lengths are 38.1 feet (11.6 m), 38.1 feet (11.6 m), and 21.0 feet (6.4 m). Another concrete culvert bridge carrying State Route 1009 over the creek was built in 1949 in Lemon Township and is 33.1 feet (10.1 m) long. A prestressed box beam or girders bridge carrying State Route 1009 across the creek was constructed in that township in 1990 and is 34.1 feet (10.4 m) long. A bridge of the same type, but carrying Pennsylvania Route 92, was constructed across the creek in 2007 in Lemon Township and is 58.1 feet (17.7 m) long.

== Biology ==
The drainage basin of Oxbow Creek is designated as a Coldwater Fishery and a Migratory Fishery.

== See also ==
- South Branch Tunkhannock Creek, next tributary of Tunkhannock Creek going downstream
- Monroe Creek (Tunkhannock Creek), next tributary of Tunkhannock Creek going upstream
- List of rivers of Pennsylvania
