= Partners Creek =

Partners Creek Parlners Creek

Physical characteristics
- Source
  - location: lake in Harford Township, Susquehanna County, Pennsylvania
  - elevation: 1,483 ft (452 m)
- Mouth
  - location: Tunkhannock Creek in Lenox Township, Susquehanna County, Pennsylvania near Lenox
  - coordinates: 41°41′21″N 75°41′16″W
  - elevation: 820 ft (250 m)
- Length: 6.4 mi (10.3 km)
- Basin size: 5.84 mi^{2} (15.1 km^{2})

Basin features
- Progression: Tunkhannock Creek → Susquehanna River → Chesapeake Bay
- Tributaries
  - left: Sterling Brook

Partners Creek (also known as Parlners Creek or Partner's Creek) is a tributary of Tunkhannock Creek in Susquehanna County, Pennsylvania, in the United States. It is approximately 6.4 miles (10.3 km) long and flows through Harford Township and Lenox Township. The watershed of the creek has an area of 5.84 square miles (15.1 km^{2}). The creek has one named tributary, which is known as Sterling Brook. The drainage basin of Partners Creek is classified as a Coldwater Fishery and a Migratory Fishery. The surficial geology in the vicinity of the creek consists of Wisconsinan Till, alluvium, bedrock, wetlands, lakes, and alluvial fan.

== Course ==
Partners Creek begins in a lake in Harford Township. It flows south-southwest for several tenths of a mile, crossing Pennsylvania Route 547 and entering a valley. It then turns south for a few tenths of a mile before turning south-southeast and entering a wetland with a lake. The creek then turns south for several tenths of a mile before turning south-southeast and then east-southeast. After a few tenths of a mile, it passes through a wetland, where it turns south-southeast and enters Lenox Township. Here, the creek passes through Acre Pond before turning south. After several tenths of a mile, it turns southeast for several tenths of a mile before receiving its only named tributary, Sterling Brook, from the left. The creek then turns south for more than a mile before turning southeast and reaching the end of its valley. A short distance further downstream, it crosses Pennsylvania Route 92 and reaches its confluence with Tunkhannock Creek.

Partners Creek is approximately 6.4 miles (10.3 km) long. It joins Tunkhannock Creek 24.32 miles (39.14 km) upstream of its mouth.

=== Tributaries ===
Partners Creek has one named tributary, which is known as Sterling Brook. Sterling Brook joins Partners Creek 1.34 miles (2.16 km) upstream of its mouth, within 1 mile (1.6 km) of West Lenox, and drains an area of 1.09 square miles (2.8 km^{2}).

== Geography and geology ==
The elevation near the mouth of Partners Creek is 820 feet (250 m) above sea level. The elevation near the creek's source is 1,483 feet (452 m) above sea level.

The surficial geology at the mouth of Partners Creek consists of alluvial fan. Further upstream, the surficial geology mainly consists of a till known as Wisconsinan Till, but there are large patches of alluvium and bedrock consisting of sandstone and shale in the area. There are also patches of wetlands and lakes, including one known as Acre Pond.

A dam known as Acre Pond Dam is situated on Partners Creek. In August 1981, it was classified as being in fair condition. The dam does not have a spillway capable of withstanding a 100 year flood, and thus often experiences overtopping. Because of this, and because a few lives could be lost in the event of a dam failure, it was classified as a "significant hazard dam". While there was some leakage through the dam, no signs of structural instability were observed.

== Watershed and biology ==
The watershed of Partners Creek has an area of 5.84 square miles (15.1 km^{2}). The mouth of the creek is in the United States Geological Survey quadrangle of Lenoxville. However, its source is in the quadrangle of Harford. The creek's mouth is located near Lenox.

Williams Field Services Company, LLC has received a permit to build, maintain, and operate a 6-inch (15 cm) natural gas pipeline crossing Partners Creek—impacting 75 feet (23 m) of the creek—and one of its unnamed tributaries.

The drainage basin of Partners Creek is classified as a Coldwater Fishery and a Migratory Fishery.

== History ==
Partners Creek was entered into the Geographic Names Information System on August 2, 1979. Its identifier in the Geographic Names Information System is 1183350. The creek is also known as Parlners Creek or Partner's Creek. The former variant name comes from Israel C. White's 1881 book The geology of Susquehanna County and Wayne County, Pennsylvania. The source of the latter variant name is unknown.

A concrete tee beam bridge carrying Pennsylvania Route 92 over Partners Creek was constructed in 1957 in Lenox Township and is 29.9 feet (9.1 m) long.

== See also ==
- Tower Branch, next tributary of Tunkhannock Creek going downstream
- Nine Partners Creek, next tributary of Tunkhannock Creek going upstream
- List of rivers of Pennsylvania
