= Bridge in Nicholson Township =

- U.S. National Register of Historic Places
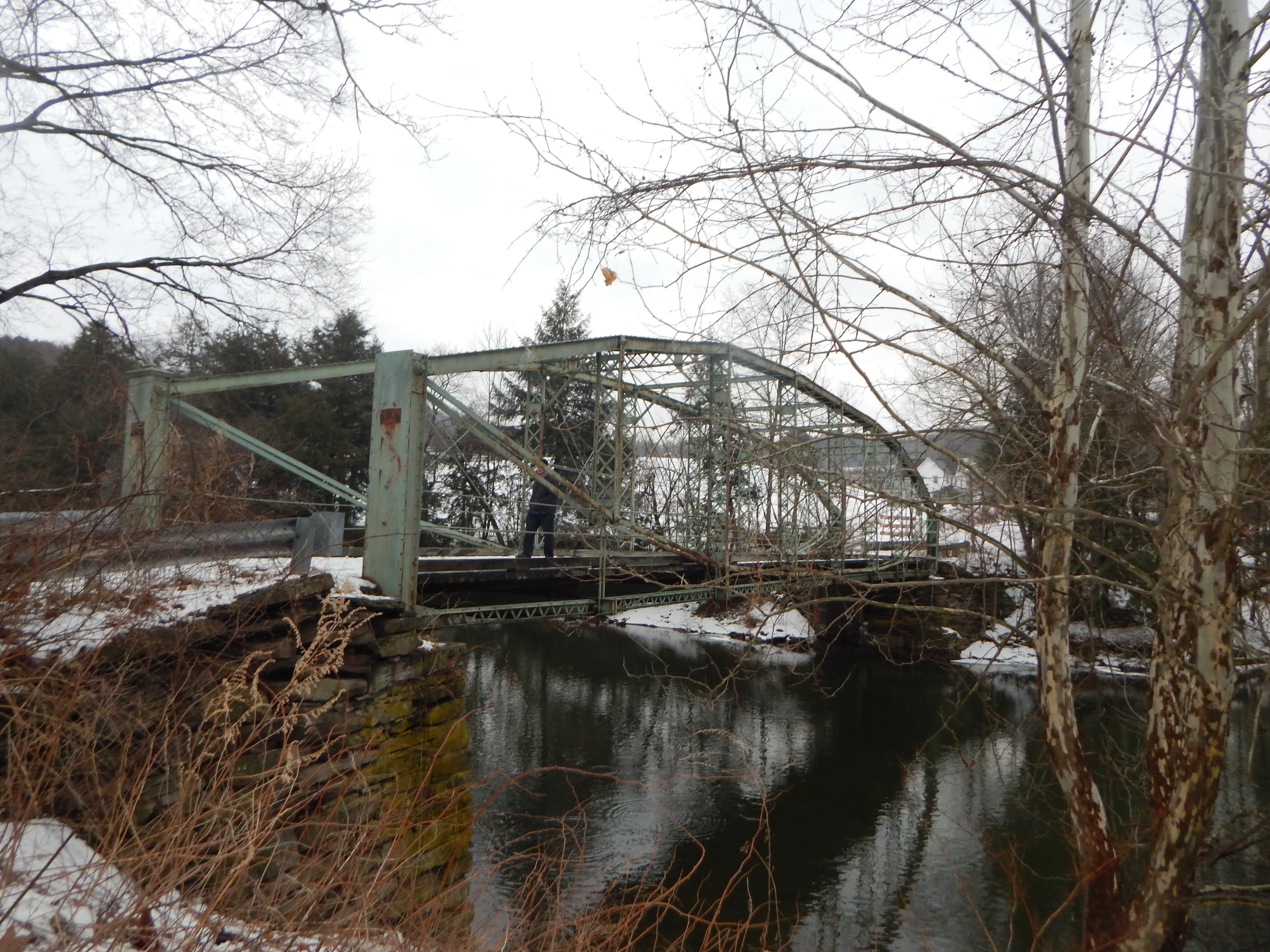
- Bridge in Nicholson Township, 2015, in dilapidated condition.

- Location within Pennsylvania Location within the United States
- Location: Legislative Route 65021 over Tunkhannock Creek near Starkville, Nicholson Township, Pennsylvania
- Coordinates: 41°36′17″N 75°49′22″W
- Area: less than one acre
- Built: 1876
- Architect: Corrugated Metal Co.
- Architectural style: Lenticular truss
- MPS: Highway Bridges Owned by the Commonwealth of Pennsylvania, Department of Transportation TR
- NRHP reference No.: 88000810
- Added to NRHP: June 22, 1988

The Bridge in Nicholson Township is a historic lenticular truss bridge located in Nicholson Township, Wyoming County, Pennsylvania. It was built in 1876, and measures 110 feet (34 m) long. It spans Tunkhannock Creek.

It was listed on the National Register of Historic Places in 1988.

== Gallery ==
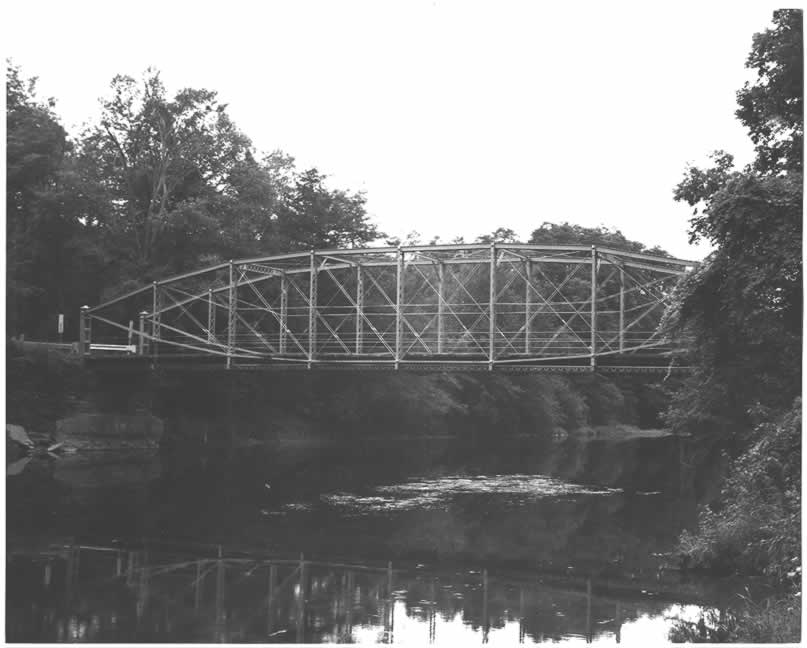
Bridge in Nicholson Township, 1982

== See also ==
- List of bridges documented by the Historic American Engineering Record in Pennsylvania
