= Bell Creek (Tunkhannock Creek tributary) =

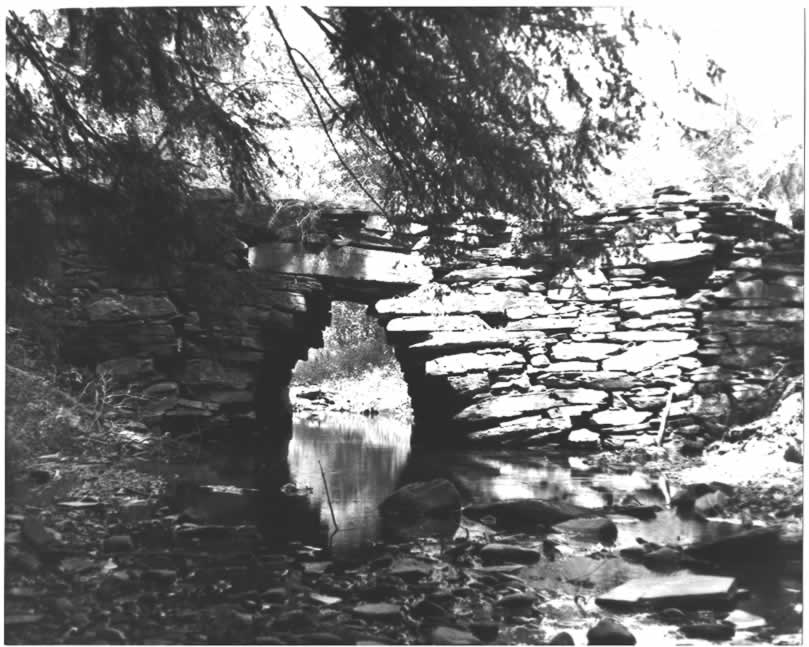
- Bell Creek at the bridge in Gibson Borough
- Etymology: Captain Bell, an early settler in the area

Physical characteristics
- Source
  - location: small unnamed pond to the west of Kennedy Hill in Gibson Township, Susquehanna County, Pennsylvania
  - elevation: 1,493 feet (455 m)
- Mouth
  - location: Tunkhannock Creek in Gibson Township, Susquehanna County, Pennsylvania near South Gibson
  - coordinates: 41°43′59″N 75°38′01″W
  - elevation: 945 feet (288 m)
- Length: 5.2 mi (8.4 km)

Basin features
- Progression: Tunkhannock Creek → Susquehanna River → Chesapeake Bay
- Tributaries
  - left: two unnamed tributaries
  - right: three unnamed tributaries

Bell Creek is a tributary of Tunkhannock Creek in Susquehanna County, Pennsylvania, in the United States. It is approximately 5.2 miles (8.4 km) long and flows through Gibson Township. The watershed of the creek has an area of 5.64 square miles (14.6 km^{2}). The surficial geology the creek's vicinity includes Wisconsinan Till, alluvium, bedrock, wetlands, lakes, and alluvial fan. It has no named tributaries, but does flow through a lake known as Potter Lake. A bridge on the National Register of Historic Places crosses Bell Creek as well. The creek's watershed is designated as a Coldwater Fishery and a Migratory Fishery.

== Course ==
Bell Creek begins in a very small unnamed pond to the west of Kennedy Hill. It flows south for a short distance, passing through a larger unnamed pond before entering Potter Lake, where it receives two unnamed tributaries from the left. The creek then flows south-southwest for a few tenths of a mile, entering a wetland and an unnamed lake, where it receives an unnamed tributary from the right. It then flows south for several tenths of a mile before turning south-southwest. After about a mile, the creek receives an unnamed tributary from the right and later turns south-southeast for a few tenths of a mile. It then turns south-southwest again for a few miles, receiving another unnamed tributary from the right before crossing Pennsylvania Route 92 and reaching its confluence with Tunkhannock Creek.

Bell Creek is approximately 5.2 miles (8.4 km) long. The creek joins Tunkhannock Creek 29.32 miles (47.19 km) upstream of its mouth.

== Geography and geology ==
The elevation near the mouth of Bell Creek is 945 feet (288 m) above sea level. The elevation near the creek's source is 1,493 feet (455 m) above sea level.

The surficial geology alongside Bell Creek at its mouth consists of alluvial fan. Further upstream, there is alluvium and a patch of bedrock consisting of sandstone and shale. The surficial geology of the surrounding valley in the lower reaches mainly includes bedrock and a till known as Wisconsinan Till. Further upstream, the surficial geology along the creek includes some alluvium, but mostly Wisconsinan Till. There are also a few patches of wetlands and lakes.

The valley of Bell Creek in its upper reaches includes a "beaded valley" that was little affected by glacial erosion but considerably affected by glacial deposition, to the point that large amounts of glacial till partly or fully block off individual valleys.

== Watershed and biology ==
The watershed of Bell Creek has an area of 5.64 square miles (14.6 km^{2}). The mouth of the creek is in the United States Geological Survey quadrangle of Lenoxville. However, its source is in the quadrangle of Thompson. The creek also passes through the quadrangle of Harford. The mouth of the creek is located within 1 mile (1.6 km) of South Gibson.

A lake known as Potter Lake is situated on Bell Creek. It is a large, mainly open-water bog-like habitat, although dams created by beavers and humans have raised the water levels, drowning much of the bog vegetation. The lake is listed on the Susquehanna County Natural Areas Inventory.

Williams Field Services Company, LLC. was once issued a permit to build, maintain, and operate a 16-inch (41 cm) natural gas pipeline and timber bridges crossing Bell Creek and one or more of its unnamed tributaries.

== History ==
Bell Creek was entered into the Geographic Names Information System on August 2, 1979. Its identifier in the Geographic Names Information System is 1169146.

Bell Creek is so named due to a Captain Bell being one of the early settlers in the area.

A steel stringer/multi-beam or girder bridge carrying Pennsylvania Route 92 over Bell Creek was constructed in Gibson Township in 1951 and is 39.0 feet (11.9 m) long. A stone corbel arch bridge in South Gibson crosses Bell Creek, carrying State Route 2067. It was added to the National Register of Historic Places on June 22, 1988.

== Biology ==
The drainage basin of Bell Creek is designated as a Coldwater Fishery and a Migratory Fishery. Wild trout naturally reproduce in the creek from its upper reaches downstream to its mouth.

== See also ==
- Nine Partners Creek, next tributary of Tunkhannock Creek going downstream
- Bear Swamp Creek, next tributary of Tunkhannock Creek going upstream
- List of rivers of Pennsylvania
