= Bear Swamp Creek =

Physical characteristics
- Source
  - location: western side of East Mountain in Gibson Township, Susquehanna County, Pennsylvania
  - elevation: 1,703 feet (519 m)
- Mouth
  - location: Tunkhannock Creek in Gibson Township, Susquehanna County, Pennsylvania near South Gibson
  - coordinates: 41°43′58″N 75°37′56″W
  - elevation: 942 feet (287 m)
- Length: 4.3 mi (6.9 km)
- Basin size: 3.92 mi^{2} (10.2 km^{2})

Basin features
- Progression: Tunkhannock Creek → Susquehanna River → Chesapeake Bay
- Tributaries
  - left: one unnamed tributary

Bear Swamp Creek is a tributary of Tunkhannock Creek in Susquehanna County, Pennsylvania, in the United States. It is approximately 4.3 miles (6.9 km) long and flows through Gibson Township and Clifford Township. The watershed of the creek has an area of 3.92 square miles (10.2 km^{2}). The creek has no named tributaries, and is not designated as an impaired waterbody. It does pass through a wetland known as Bear Swamp. The drainage basin of the creek is designated as a Coldwater Fishery and a Migratory Fishery.

== Course ==
Bear Swamp Creek begins on the western side of East Mountain in Gibson Township. It flows west-southwest into a valley for several tenths of a mile before turning southwest. After several tenths of a mile, the creek reaches the bottom of the mountain, passes through an unnamed lake and turns south-southwest, receiving an unnamed tributary from the left. After a few miles, the creek enters a wetland known as Bear Swamp and passes into Clifford Township. Here, it turns west and then north, flowing alongside Carey Hill and reentering Gibson Township after a few tenths of a mile. The creek then turns north-northwest for several tenths of a mile before turning north. A few tenths of a mile further downstream, it reaches its confluence with Tunkhannock Creek.

Bear Swamp Creek is approximately 4.3 miles (6.9 km) long. The creek joins Tunkhannock Creek 29.39 miles (47.30 km) upstream of its mouth.

== Hydrology, geography and geology ==
The elevation near the mouth of Bear Swamp Creek is 942 feet (287 m) above sea level. The elevation near the creek's source is 1,703 feet (519 m) above sea level.

The surficial geology near the mouth of Bear Swamp Creek mainly consists of a till known as Wisconsinan Till, plus some patches of alluvium. However, the nearby Carey Hill has surficial geology consisting almost entirely of bedrock consisting of sandstone and shale. There are some patches of peat bogs, wetlands, and lakes near the creek, but the surficial geology in the upper reaches mostly consists of alluvium and Wisconsinan Till, with some bedrock further away.

Bear Swamp is not designated as an impaired waterbody.

== Watershed and biology ==
The watershed of Bear Swamp Creek has an area of 3.92 square miles (10.2 km^{2}). The mouth of the creek is in the United States Geological Survey of Lenoxville. Its source is in the quadrangle of Clifford. The creek's mouth is located within 1 mile (1.6 km) of South Gibson.

A swamp known as Bear Swamp is located in the vicinity of Bear Swamp Creek.

The drainage basin of Bear Swamp Creek is designated as a Coldwater Fishery and a Migratory Fishery. The designated use of the creek is aquatic life.

== History ==
Bear Swamp Creek was entered into the Geographic Names Information System on August 2, 1979. Its identifier in the Geographic Names Information System is 1168952.

Bear Swamp, which is located near Bear Swamp Creek, received its name after John Collar, one of the earliest settlers on Tunkhannock Creek in Gibson Township, trapped nine bears there in one season. An unsuccessful oil well was once sunk at Bear Swamp.

== See also ==
- Bell Creek (Tunkhannock Creek), next tributary of Tunkhannock Creek going downstream
- Rock Creek (Tunkhannock Creek), next tributary of Tunkhannock Creek going upstream
- List of rivers of Pennsylvania
