= Millard Creek =

Physical characteristics
- Source
  - location: unnamed pond south of a wetland in Harford Township, Susquehanna County, Pennsylvania
  - elevation: 1,458 ft (444 m)
- Mouth
  - location: Tunkhannock Creek in Lenox Township, Susquehanna County, Pennsylvania near Glenwood
  - coordinates: 41°39′25″N 75°43′09″W
  - elevation: 778 ft (237 m)
- Length: 6.2 mi (10.0 km)

Basin features
- Progression: Tunkhannock Creek → Susquehanna River → Chesapeake Bay
- Tributaries
  - left: one unnamed tributary

Millard Creek is a tributary of Tunkhannock Creek in Susquehanna County, Pennsylvania. It is approximately 6.2 miles (10.0 km) long and flows through Harford Township and Lenox Township. The watershed of the creek has an area of 5.66 square miles (14.7 km^{2}). The creek is not designated as an impaired waterbody. The surficial geology in its vicinity includes Wisconsinan Till, alluvium, wetlands, lakes, bedrock, and alluvial fan. The dominant land uses in the creek's watershed include forested land and agricultural land. A number of bridges have been constructed over the creek. Its drainage basin is designated as a Coldwater Fishery and a Migratory Fishery.

== Course ==
Millard Creek begins in a small unnamed pond to the south of a wetland in Harford Township. It flows south-southwest for a few tenths of a mile before turning south-southeast for several tenths of a mile, entering Lenox Township. Here, the creek turns south-southwest for several tenths of a mile before turning east and then southeast and then south-southwest. After several tenths of a mile, it passes through a wetland and a lake before turning south. For the next several tenths of a mile, it flows alongside Jeffers Hill before passing through a wetland and Jeffers Pond. The creek then turns southwest for a short distance before turning south-southeast. After several tenths of a mile, it passes through another wetland and turns southeast for a few tenths of a mile before receiving an unnamed tributary from the left. It then turns south for several tenths of a mile, beginning to flow alongside Pennsylvania Route 167 on one side and Hickory Ridge on the other side. The creek then turns southeast for a few tenths of a mile before turning east-southeast and crossing Pennsylvania Route 92. A short distance further downstream, it reaches its confluence with Tunkhannock Creek.

Millard Creek is approximately 6.2 miles (10.0 km) long. It joins Tunkhannock Creek 20.95 miles (33.72 km) upstream of its mouth.

== Hydrology ==
Millard Creek is not designated as an impaired waterbody.

The total sediment load in Millard Creek is 2,822,343 pounds (1,280,193 kg) per year. Cropland is by far the largest contributor, accounting for 2,600,926 pounds (1,179,760 kg) per year. Deciduous forest an hay/pastures/grass contribute 93,348 and 88,255 pounds (42,342 and 40,032 kg) per year respectively. The annual sediment load contributed by coniferous forest is 17,638 pounds (8,000 kg), while 13,164 pounds (5,971 kg) comes from mixed forest and 9,011 pounds (4,087 kg) comes from high-intensity development.

The annual nitrogen load in Millard Creek is 14,604 pounds (6,624 kg). A total of 10,509 pounds (4,767 kg) per year comes from cropland, while 1,203 pounds (546 kg) comes from groundwater and 1,194 pounds (542 kg) comes from septic systems and 941 pounds (427 kg) comes from hay/pastures/grass. Deciduous forests contribute 452 pounds (205 kg) per year, coniferous forests contribute 128 pounds (58 kg), mixed forests contribute 83 pounds (38 kg), and high-intensity development contributes 64 feet (20 m).

The total phosphorus load in Millard Creek is 1,861 pounds (844 kg). Annually, 1,585 pounds (719 kg) comes from cropland, 108 pounds (49 kg) comes from groundwater, 76 pounds (34 kg) comes from hay/pastures/grass, and 58 pounds (26 kg) comes from deciduous forest. A total of 12 pounds (5.4 kg) per year comes from coniferous forest, mixed forest and high-intensity development contribute 9 pounds (4.1 kg) each, and septic systems contribute 4 pounds (1.8 kg) per year.

Point source pollution does not contribute any nitrogen, phosphorus, or sediment to Millard Creek.

== Geography and geology ==
The elevation near the mouth of Millard Creek is 778 feet (237 m) above sea level. The elevation near the creek's source is 1,458 feet (444 m) above sea level.

The geology in the entire watershed of Millard Creek consists of interbedded sedimentary rock of the Catskill Formation.

The surficial geology in the vicinity of Millard Creek mostly consists of a till known as Wisconsinan Till. However, patches of alluvium, wetlands, and lakes occur along some areas of the creek and the surficial geology on some nearby hills include bedrock consisting of sandstone and shale. There is also a patch of alluvial fan near the mouth of the creek.

== Watershed ==
The watershed of Millard Creek has an area of 5.66 square miles (14.7 km^{2}). The stream is entirely within the United States Geological Survey quadrangle of Lenoxville. Its mouth is located within 1 mile (1.6 km) of Glenwood.

The main land use in the watershed of Millard Creek is forested land, which occupies nearly 2,500 acres (1,000 ha) in the watershed. Agricultural land occupies slightly over 1,000 acres (400 ha) and urban land occupies only a very small part of the creek's watershed.

The watershed of Millard Creek is relatively long in a north–south direction and relatively narrow in an east–west direction.

== History ==
Millard Creek was entered into the Geographic Names Information System on August 2, 1979. Its identifier in the Geographic Names Information System is 1181198.

A prestressed box beam or girders bridge carrying State Route 2039 over Millard Creek in Lenox Township was built in 1951 and repaired in 2010 and is 24.0 feet (7.3 m) long. A concrete tee beam bridge carrying Pennsylvania Route 92 over the creek in Lenox Township was built in 1959 and is 34.1 feet (10.4 m) long.

In 2001, Millard Creek was used as the reference watershed for the total maximum daily load for South Branch Wyalusing Creek.

== Biology ==
The drainage basin of Millard Creek is designated as a Coldwater Fishery and a Migratory Fishery. Wild trout naturally reproduce in Millard Creek from its mouth upstream for 2.67 miles (4.30 km). The designated use of the creek is aquatic life.

== See also ==
- East Branch Tunkhannock Creek, next tributary of Tunkhannock Creek going downstream
- Tower Branch, next tributary of Tunkhannock Creek going upstream
- List of rivers of Pennsylvania
