= Tower Branch =

Physical characteristics
- Source
  - location: wetland in Harford Township, Susquehanna County, Pennsylvania
  - elevation: 1,381 ft (421 m)
- Mouth
  - location: Tunkhannock Creek in Lenox Township, Susquehanna County, Pennsylvania near Glenwood
  - coordinates: 41°40′31″N 75°42′18″W
  - elevation: 807 ft (246 m)
- Length: 4.8 mi (7.7 km)

Basin features
- Progression: Tunkhannock Creek → Susquehanna River → Chesapeake Bay
- Tributaries
  - right: two unnamed tributaries

Tower Branch is a tributary of Tunkhannock Creek in Susquehanna County, Pennsylvania, in the United States. It is approximately 4.8 miles (7.7 km) long and flows through Harford Township and Lenox Township. The watershed of the stream has an area of 3.69 square miles (9.6 km^{2}). The stream is not designated as an impaired waterbody and has no named tributaries. The surficial geology in its vicinity consists mainly of Wisconsinan Till, alluvium, with some lakes, wetlands, bedrock, and alluvial fan. The stream's drainage basin is classified as a Coldwater Fishery and a Migratory Fishery.

== Course ==
Tower Branch begins in a wetland in Harford Township. It flows south-southeast for a few tenths of a mile, passing through a small unnamed pond and entering another wetland. The stream then turns south, entering Lenox Township and passing through another pond and another wetland. It then flows south-southwest for several tenths of a mile before turning south-southeast for several tenths of a mile. In this reach, it receives an unnamed tributary from the right. The stream eventually turns southeast for several tenths of a mile before abruptly turning south-southwest for more than a mile, receiving an unnamed tributary from the right. It then turns south for several tenths of a mile before turning southeast and crossing Pennsylvania Route 92. A short distance further downstream, it reaches its confluence with Tunkhannock Creek.

Tower Branch is approximately 4.8 miles (7.7 km) long. It joins Tunkhannock Creek 22.70 miles (36.53 km) upstream of its mouth.

== Hydrology, geography and geology ==
The elevation near the mouth of Tower Branch is 807 feet (246 m) above sea level. The elevation near the stream's source is 1,381 feet (421 m) above sea level.

The surficial geology near the mouth of Tower Branch mainly consists of alluvial fan. Most of the area in stream's vicinity has its surficial geology dominated by a till known as Wisconsinan Till, but there are patches of alluvium and smaller patches of lakes and wetlands. Bedrock consisting of sandstone and shale occurs in the surficial geology on parts of some hills near the stream.

Tower Branch is not designated as an impaired waterbody.

== Watershed ==
The watershed of Tower Branch has an area of 3.69 square miles (9.6 km^{2}). The stream is entirely within the United States Geological Survey quadrangle of Lenoxville. Its mouth is located near Glenwood.

Williams Field Services Company, LLC has received a permit to build, maintain, and operate a 12-inch (30 cm) natural gas pipeline passing through the watershed of Tower Branch and crossing one or more of its unnamed tributaries.

== History ==
Tower Branch was entered into the Geographic Names Information System on August 2, 1979. Its identifier in the Geographic Names Information System is 1189677.

A concrete tee beam bridge carrying Pennsylvania Route 92 over Tower Branch was constructed in Lenox Township in 1957 and is 27.9 feet (8.5 m) long.

== Biology ==
The drainage basin of Tower Branch is classified as a Coldwater Fishery and a Migratory Fishery. Wild trout naturally reproduce in Tower Branch from its upper reaches downstream to its mouth, a distance of 4.10 miles (6.60 km). The designated use for the stream is aquatic life.

The Cecil/Wagner Property, part of the North Branch Land Trust is located in the watersheds of Tower Branch and Tunkhannock Creek, in Lenox Township. The property has an area of 84 acres (34 ha) and includes agricultural fields, coniferous forests, deciduous forests, meadows, a pond, a stream, and wetlands. It contains an "astonishing diversity of high-quality flora and fauna species" as well as species that are rare in the area. The property is home to nine Species of Special Concern in Pennsylvania.

== See also ==
- Millard Creek, next tributary of Tunkhannock Creek going downstream
- Partners Creek, next tributary of Tunkhannock Creek going upstream
- List of rivers of Pennsylvania
