= Rock Creek (Tunkhannock Creek tributary) =

Physical characteristics
- Source
  - location: unnamed lake in Herrick Township, Susquehanna County, Pennsylvania
  - elevation: 1,960 feet (600 m)
- Mouth
  - location: Tunkhannock Creek in Gibson Township, Susquehanna County, Pennsylvania near Smiley
  - coordinates: 41°46′48″N 75°35′05″W
  - elevation: 1,045 feet (319 m)
- Length: 3.8 mi (6.1 km)
- Basin size: 3.76 mi^{2} (9.7 km^{2})

Basin features
- Progression: Tunkhannock Creek → Susquehanna River → Chesapeake Bay
- Tributaries
  - left: one unnamed tributary
  - right: two unnamed tributaries

Rock Creek is a tributary of Tunkhannock Creek in Susquehanna County, Pennsylvania, in the United States. It is approximately 3.8 miles (6.1 km) long and flows through Herrick Township, Ararat Township, and Gibson Township. The watershed of the creek has an area of 3.76 square miles (9.7 km^{2}). The creek has no named tributaries and is not designated as an impaired waterbody. It is classified as Class A Wild Trout Waters.

== Course ==
Rock Creek begins in an unnamed lake in Herrick Township. It flows in a north-northeasterly direction for several tenths of a mile, entering Ararat Township. Here, the creek turns north-northwest for several tenths of a mile, entering a valley known as Chipmunk Hollow. Here, it receives an unnamed tributary from the right and turns west-northwest for several tenths of a mile. The creek then turns southwest for several tenths of a mile, entering Gibson Township and receiving two unnamed tributaries from the left and turning west-northwest. Several tenths of a mile further downstream, it receives an unnamed tributary from the right and turns west for a few tenths of a mile before reaching the end of Chipmunk Hollow and turning south. After several tenths of a mile of flowing parallel to Tunkhannock Creek, it enters a wetland and turns southwest, reaching its confluence with Tunkhannock Creek.

Rock Creek is approximately 3.8 miles (6.1 km) long. It joins Tunkhannock Creek 34.02 miles (54.75 km) upstream of its mouth.

== Hydrology ==
Rock Creek is not designated as an impaired waterbody. The total concentration of alkalinity in the creek is 39 milligrams per liter (0.039 oz/cu ft).

== Geography and geology ==
The elevation near the mouth of Rock Creek is 1,045 feet (319 m) above sea level. The elevation near the creek's source is 1,960 feet (600 m) above sea level.

Rock Creek has been described as a small creek.

The surficial geology near the lower reaches of Rock Creek mainly consists of alluvial terrace and alluvial fan, with some alluvium. Further upstream, the surficial geology near the creek mainly consists of a till known as Wisconsinan Till, with bedrock consisting of sandstone and shale on nearby hills, a patch of alluvium, a small patch of fill, and a couple of lakes.

== Watershed and biology ==
The watershed of Rock Creek has an area of 3.76 square miles (9.7 km^{2}). The creek is entirely within the United States Geological Survey quadrangle of Thompson. Its mouth is located within 1 mile (1.6 km) of Smiley.

A lake known as Willis Lake at the headwaters of an unnamed tributary to Rock Creek. It has a surface area of 25.3 acres (10.2 ha), a typical depth of 21 feet (6.4 m) (sometimes reaching up to 30 feet (9.1 m)) and a volume of 113,000,000 US gallons (430,000 m^{3}).

Wild trout naturally reproduce in Rock Creek from its headwaters downstream to its mouth. The creek is designated as Class A Wild Trout Waters from its headwaters downstream to its mouth.

The designated use for Rock Creek is aquatic life.

== History ==
Rock Creek was entered into the Geographic Names Information System on August 2, 1979. Its identifier in the Geographic Names Information System is 1185249. The creek is also known as Chipmunk Hollow in a 1932 United States Geological Survey map. However, in 1968, David G. Lappin unsuccessfully attempted to verify this name, but all residents who were asked referred to it as Rock Creek.

A farm known as Rock Creek Farm has existed on Rock Creek since at least the 1960s.

A concrete culvert bridge carrying State Route 2036 across Rock Creek was constructed in Gibson Township in 1980 and is 22.0 feet (6.7 m) long.

== See also ==
- Bear Swamp Creek, next tributary of Tunkhannock Creek going downstream
- List of rivers of Pennsylvania
