= South Gibson, Pennsylvania =

Unincorporated community in Pennsylvania, US

South Gibson
- Unincorporated community
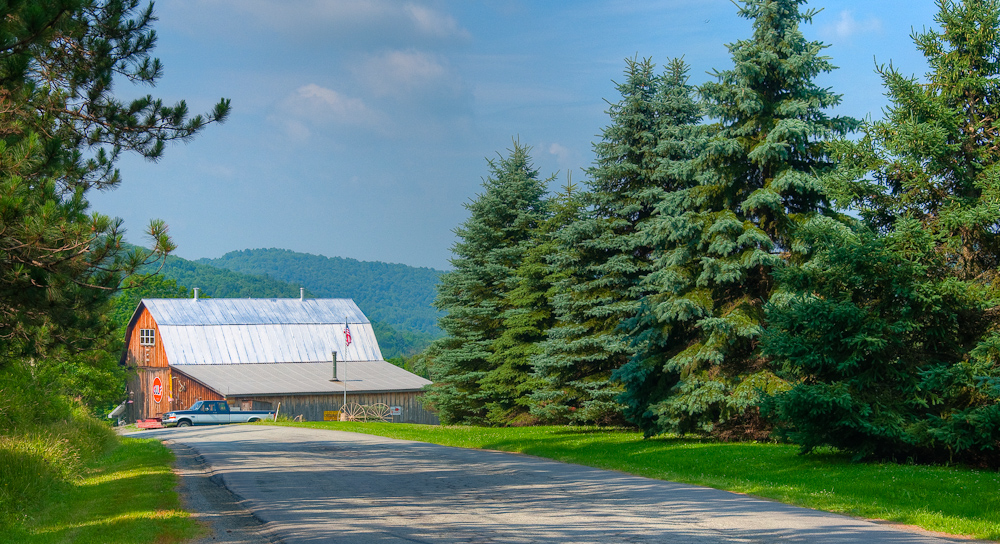

- Location within the state of Pennsylvania South Gibson (the United States)
- Coordinates: 41°44′03″N 75°37′49″W
- Country: United States
- State: Pennsylvania
- County: Susquehanna
- Township: Gibson Township
- Elevation: 997 ft (304 m)
- Time zone: UTC-5 (Eastern (EST))
  - Summer (DST): UTC-4 (EDT)
- ZIP codes: 18842
- Area codes: 570 & 272
- GNIS feature ID: 1188069

South Gibson is an unincorporated community located within Gibson Township, Susquehanna County, Pennsylvania, United States.
