= Lathrop Township, Pennsylvania =

Township in Pennsylvania, US

- Township
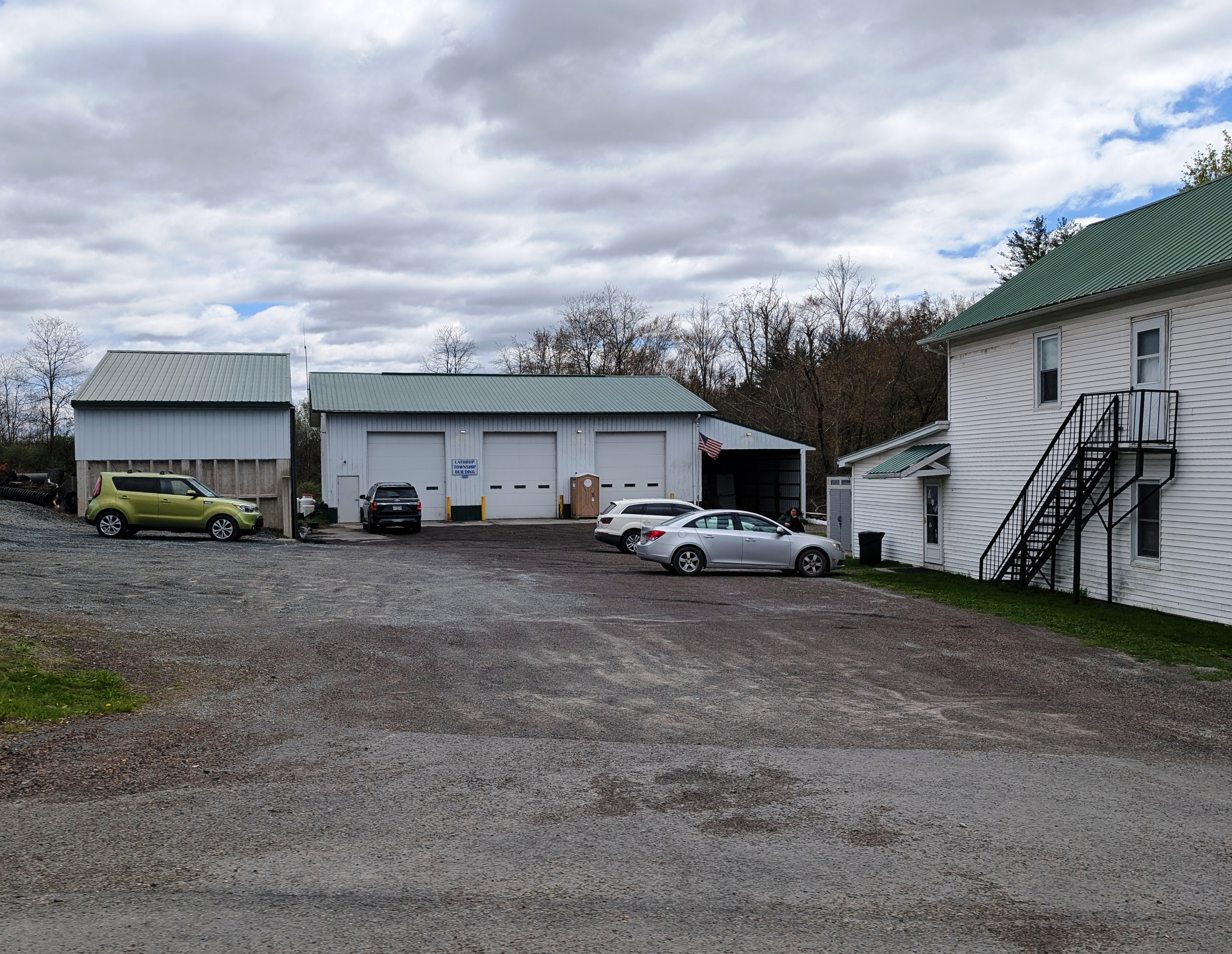
- Lathrop Township Building

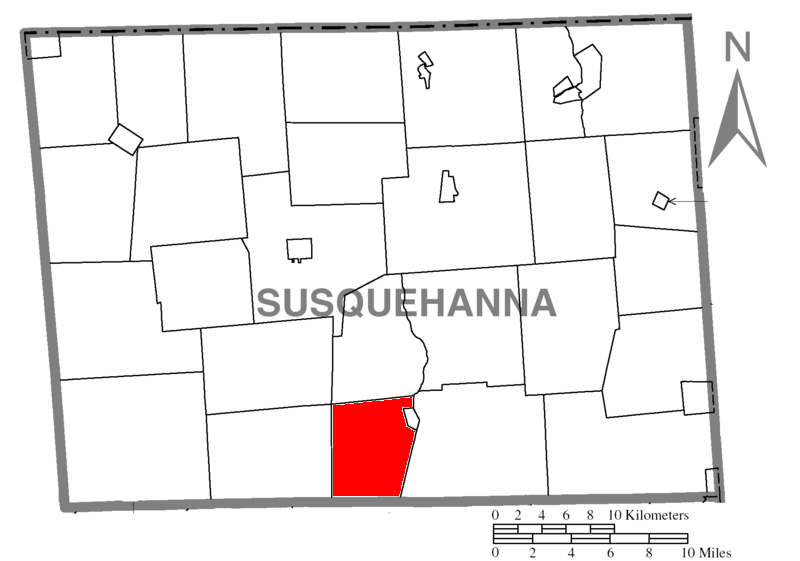

- Location of Pennsylvania in the United States
- Coordinates: 41°40′00″N 75°49′59″W
- Country: United States
- State: Pennsylvania
- County: Susquehanna
- Settled: 1799
- Incorporated: 1846

Area
  - Total: 20.54 sq mi (53.20 km^{2})
  - Land: 20.36 sq mi (52.74 km^{2})
  - Water: 0.17 sq mi (0.45 km^{2})

Population (2020)
  - Total: 771 ▼
  - Estimate (2021): 770
  - Density: 39.2/sq mi (15.13/km^{2})
- Time zone: UTC-5 (EST)
  - Summer (DST): UTC-4 (EDT)
- Area code: 570
- FIPS code: 42-115-41656

Lathrop Township is a township in Susquehanna County, Pennsylvania, United States. The population was 771 at the 2020 census.

== Geography ==
According to the United States Census Bureau, the township has a total area of 20.53 square miles (53.2 km^{2}), of which 20.36 square miles (52.7 km^{2}) is land and 0.17 square miles (0.44 km^{2}) (0.83%) is water.

== Demographics ==
Historical population
Census	Pop.	Note	%±
2010	841		—
2020	771		−8.3%
2021 (est.)	770		−0.1%
U.S. Decennial Census

As of the census of 2010, there were 841 people, 345 households, and 253 families residing in the township. The population density was 41.3 people per square mile (15.9 people/km^{2}). There were 421 housing units at an average density of 20.7 per square mile (8.0/km^{2}). The racial makeup of the township was 99.3% White, 0.1% from other races, and 0.6% from two or more races. Hispanic or Latino of any race were 0.2% of the population.

There were 345 households, out of which 26.1% had children under the age of 18 living with them, 59.4% were married couples living together, 8.7% had a female householder with no husband present, and 26.7% were non-families. 21.4% of all households were made up of individuals, and 9% had someone living alone who was 65 years of age or older. The average household size was 2.44 and the average family size was 2.81.

In the township the population was spread out, with 19.1% under the age of 18, 62.4% from 18 to 64, and 18.5% who were 65 years of age or older. The median age was 46.5 years.

The median income for a household in the township was $35,341, and the median income for a family was $46,719. Males had a median income of $36,518 versus $26,389 for females. The per capita income for the township was $21,481. About 3.6% of families and 4.7% of the population were below the poverty line, including 4% of those under age 18 and 4.9% of those age 65 or over.
