= Lemon Township, Wyoming County, Pennsylvania =

Township in Pennsylvania, US

Lemon Township
- Township
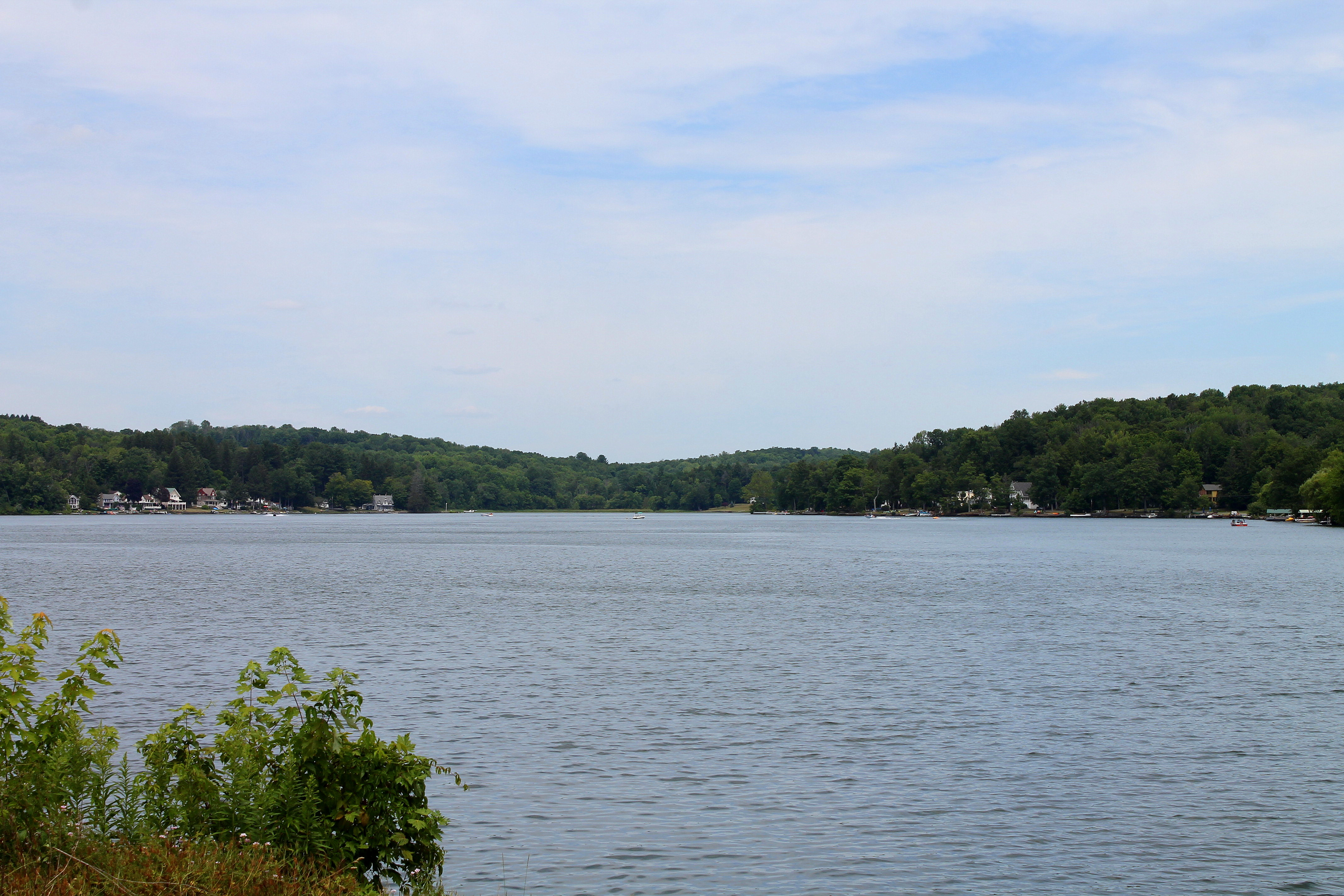
- Lake Carey in Lemon Township

- Location of Pennsylvania in the United States
- Coordinates: 41°36′00″N 75°51′59″W
- Country: United States
- State: Pennsylvania
- County: Wyoming

Area
  - Total: 16.66 sq mi (43.14 km^{2})
  - Land: 16.06 sq mi (41.59 km^{2})
  - Water: 0.60 sq mi (1.55 km^{2})
- Elevation: 892 ft (272 m)

Population (2020)
  - Total: 1,135 ▼
  - Estimate (2021): 1,133
  - Density: 75.3/sq mi (29.07/km^{2})
- Time zone: UTC-5 (EST)
  - Summer (DST): UTC-4 (EDT)
- ZIP Code: 18657
- Area code: 570
- FIPS code: 42-131-42616
- Website: https://lemontownshippa.gov/

Lemon Township is a township in Wyoming County, Pennsylvania, United States. The population was 1,135 at the 2020 census.

== Geography ==
According to the United States Census Bureau, the township has a total area of 16.7 square miles (43 km^{2}): 16.1 square miles (42 km^{2}) is land and 0.6 square miles (1.6 km^{2}), or 3.59%, water.

== Demographics ==
Historical population
Census	Pop.	Note	%±
2010	1,243		—
2020	1,135		−8.7%
2021 (est.)	1,133		−0.2%
U.S. Decennial Census

As of the census of 2010, there were 1,243 people, 526 households, and 346 families residing in the township. The population density was 77.2 inhabitants per square mile (29.8/km^{2}). There were 660 housing units at an average density of 41 units per square mile (16 units/km^{2}). The racial makeup of the township was 99.2% White, 0.2% Asian, 0.4% from other races, and 0.2% from two or more races. Hispanic or Latino of any race were 1.3% of the population.

There were 526 households, out of which 29.1% had children under the age of 18 living with them, 51.5% were married couples living together, 6.5% had a female householder with no husband present, and 34.2% were non-families. 27.4% of all households were made up of individuals, and 10.6% had someone living alone who was 65 years of age or older. The average household size was 2.35 and the average family size was 2.84.

In the township the population was spread out, with 21% under the age of 18, 65.5% from 18 to 64, and 13.5% who were 65 years of age or older. The median age was 44.3 years.

The median income for a household in the township was $47,604, and the median income for a family was $60,096. Males had a median income of $41,250 versus $26,771 for females. The per capita income for the township was $24,561. About 3.1% of families and 6.4% of the population were below the poverty line, including 2.7% of those under age 18 and 11.6% of those age 65 or over.
