= Nicholson Township, Wyoming County, Pennsylvania =

Township in Pennsylvania, US

Nicholson Township
- Township
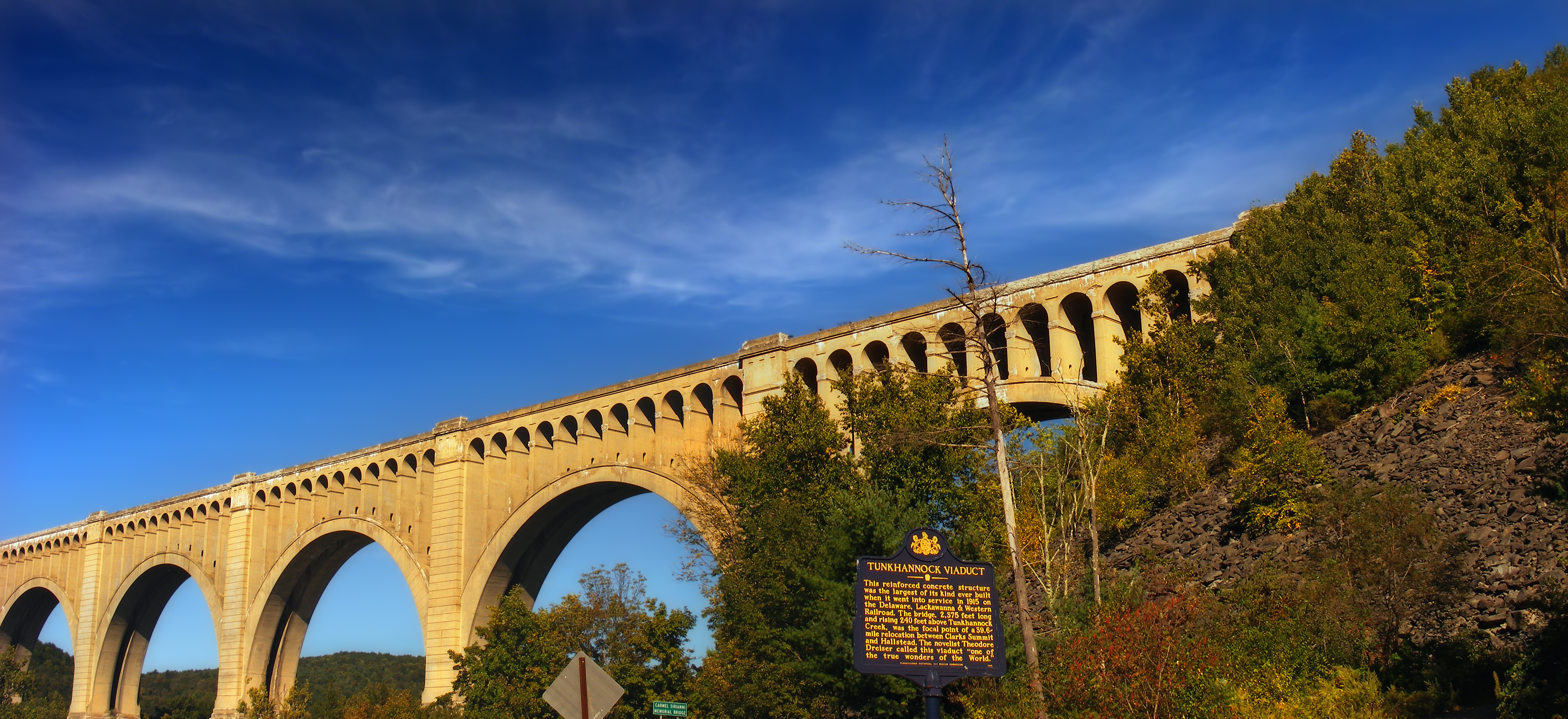
- Tunkhannock Viaduct

- Location of Pennsylvania in the United States
- Coordinates: 41°38′00″N 75°44′58″W
- Country: United States
- State: Pennsylvania
- County: Wyoming

Area
  - Total: 23.10 sq mi (59.84 km^{2})
  - Land: 22.84 sq mi (59.16 km^{2})
  - Water: 0.26 sq mi (0.68 km^{2})
- Elevation: 807 ft (246 m)

Population (2020)
  - Total: 1,259 ▼
  - Estimate (2021): 1,253
  - Density: 58.2/sq mi (22.46/km^{2})
- Time zone: UTC-5 (EST)
  - Summer (DST): UTC-4 (EDT)
- Area code: 570
- FIPS code: 42-131-54408

Nicholson Township is a township in Wyoming County, Pennsylvania, United States. The population was 1,259 at the 2020 census.

== History ==
The Bridge in Nicholson Township was listed on the National Register of Historic Places in 1988.

== Geography ==
According to the United States Census Bureau, the township has a total area of 23.1 square miles (60 km^{2}), of which 22.8 square miles (59 km^{2}) is land and 0.3 square miles (0.78 km^{2}) (1.3%) is water.

== Demographics ==
Historical population
Census	Pop.	Note	%±
2010	1,385		—
2020	1,259		−9.1%
2021 (est.)	1,253		−0.5%
U.S. Decennial Census

As of the census of 2010, there were 1,385 people, 573 households, and 393 families residing in the township. The population density was 60.7 inhabitants per square mile (23.4/km^{2}). There were 695 housing units at an average density of 30.5 units per square mile (11.8 units/km^{2}). The racial makeup of the township was 98.3% White, 0.5% African American, 0.4% Native American, 0.3% Asian, and 0.5% from two or more races. Hispanic or Latino of any race were 0.9% of the population.

There were 573 households, out of which 24.3% had children under the age of 18 living with them, 51.8% were married couples living together, 8.7% had a female householder with no husband present, and 31.4% were non-families. 26.2% of all households were made up of individuals, and 10.6% had someone living alone who was 65 years of age or older. The average household size was 2.42 and the average family size was 2.88.

In the township the population was spread out, with 19.5% under the age of 18, 64.5% from 18 to 64, and 16% who were 65 years of age or older. The median age was 46 years.

The median income for a household in the township was $40,481, and the median income for a family was $64,375. Males had a median income of $33,281 versus $30,670 for females. The per capita income for the township was $23,813. About 7.3% of families and 9.4% of the population were below the poverty line, including 2.8% of those under age 18 and 13.8% of those age 65 or over.
