= Tunkhannock Creek (Susquehanna River tributary) =

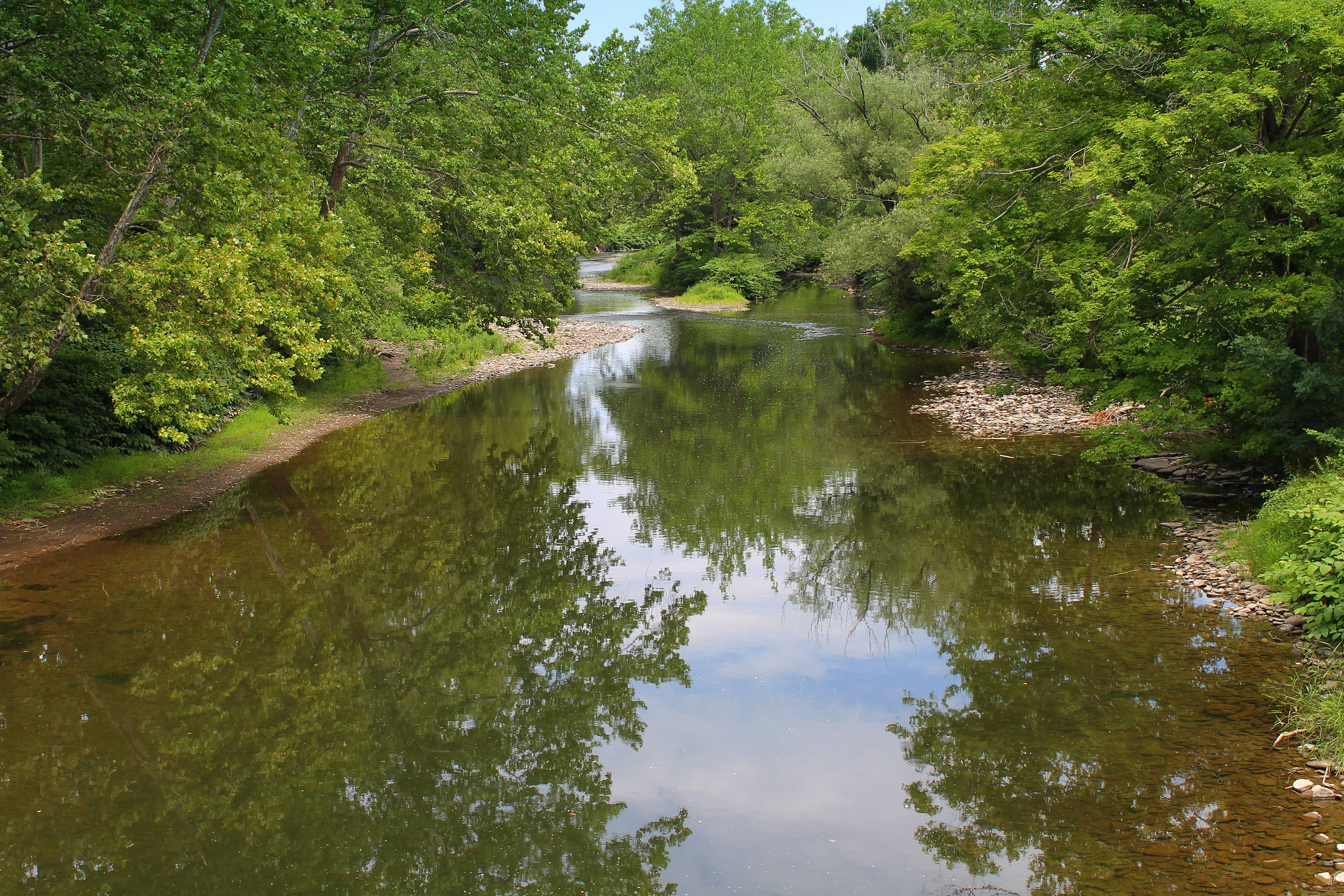
- Tunkhannock Creek looking upstream near Nicholson, Pennsylvania

Physical characteristics
- Source
  - location: Jackson Township, Susquehanna County, Pennsylvania
- Mouth
  - location: Susquehanna River in Tunkhannock, Wyoming County, Pennsylvania
  - coordinates: 41°32′09″N 75°56′48″W
- Length: 42.3 mi (68.1 km)
- Basin size: 413 sq mi (1,070 km^{2})

Basin features
- Progression: Tunkhannock Creek → Susquehanna River → Chesapeake Bay
- Tributaries
  - left: Rock Creek, Bear Swamp Creek, East Branch Tunkhannock Creek, South Branch Tunkhannock Creek
  - right: Bell Creek, Nine Partners Creek, Partners Creek, Tower Branch, Millard Creek, Utley Brook, Martins Creek, Horton Creek, Field Brook, Monroe Creek, Oxbow Creek, Billings Mill Brook, Swale Brook

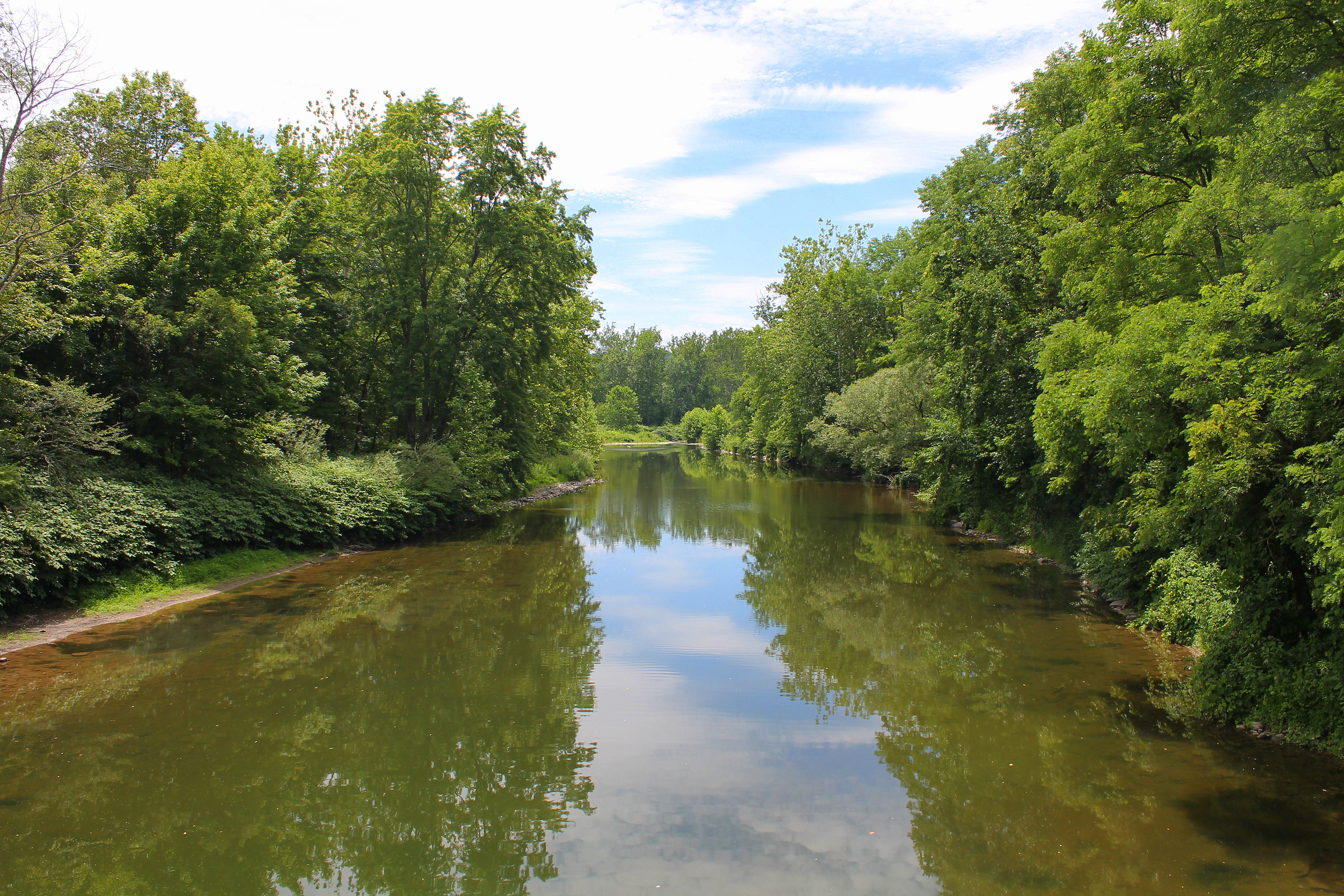
Tunkhannock Creek looking downstream near Nicholson

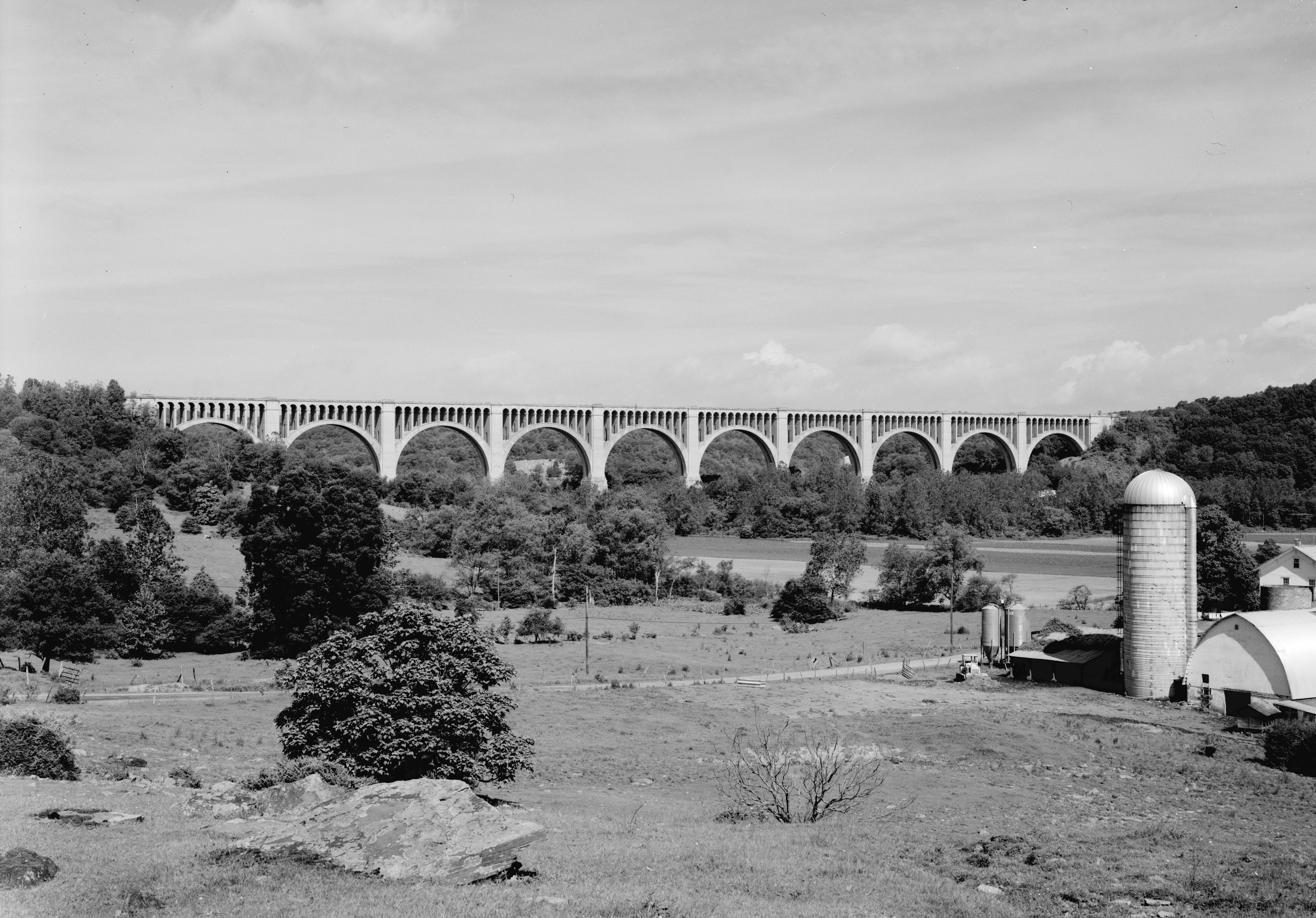
The Tunkhannock Viaduct crossing over the creek near Nicholson, Pennsylvania

Tunkhannock Creek is a 42.3-mile-long (68.1 km) tributary of the Susquehanna River in Northeastern Pennsylvania.

English translations of the Lenni-Lenape Tunkhannock vary, including "meeting of the waters", "small stream", "wilderness stream", and "wooded stream". Most sources note, however, that hanna, as in Susque-, Toby-, Loyal-, Tunkhannock, and Lackawanna, suggests "moving water."

Tunkhannock Creek is traced northeast along PA Highway 92 to its source of Cheraine Pond near Jackson. It has an eastern branch that rises in Herrick Township to the east and north of Elk Mountain and a southern branch that rises near Montdale in Scott Township. Tunkhannock Creek's major tributaries include, Nine Partners Creek, East Branch Tunkhannock Creek, Horton Creek, Martins Creek, Hop Bottom Creek, and South Branch Tunkhannock Creek.

The 2,400-foot-long (730 m) Erie Lackawanna Railway Tunkhannock Viaduct (called locally the "Nicholson Bridge"), featuring multiple high concrete arches, passes over the creek near Nicholson.

Tunkhannock Creek empties into the Susquehanna at Tunkhannock in Wyoming County.

== South Branch Tunkhannock Creek ==
The South Branch joins the main branch approximately 1.8 miles (2.9 km) downstream of the community of East Lemon, and approximately 6.3 miles (10.1 km) upstream of the Susquehanna River.

== See also ==
- List of rivers of Pennsylvania
