= Tinker Hollow =

Physical characteristics
- Source
  - location: valley to the east of Tinker Hill in Clifford Township, Susquehanna County, Pennsylvania
  - elevation: 1,620 feet (490 m)
- Mouth
  - location: Little Creek in Clifford Township, Susquehanna County, Pennsylvania near Burdick Corners
  - coordinates: 41°41′48″N 75°30′57″W
  - elevation: 1,358 feet (414 m)
- Length: 1.0 mi (1.6 km)
- Basin size: 1.33 sq mi (3.4 km^{2})

Basin features
- Progression: Little Creek → East Branch Tunkhannock Creek → Tunkhannock Creek → Susquehanna River → Chesapeake Bay
- Tributaries
  - right: one unnamed tributary

Tinker Hollow is a tributary of Little Creek in Susquehanna County, Pennsylvania, in the United States. It is approximately 1.0 mile (1.6 km) long and flows through Clifford Township. The watershed of the stream has an area of 1.33 square miles (3.4 km^{2}). The stream is not designated as an impaired waterbody and has wild trout naturally reproducing within it. The surficial geology in its vicinity includes Wisconsinan Till, alluvium, Wisconsinan Ice-Contact Stratified Drift, bedrock, and a lake.

== Course ==
Tinker Hollow begins in a valley to the east of Tinker Hill. It flows north-northeast for a few tenths of a mile before turning north-northwest, receiving an unnamed tributary from the right and continuing to flow northwest. Several tenths of a mile further downstream, the stream reaches the end of its valley and reaches its confluence with Little Creek.

Tinker Hollow is approximately 1.0 mile (1.6 km) long. The stream joins Little Creek 0.60 miles (0.97 km) upstream of its mouth.

== Hydrology, geography, and geology ==
The elevation near the mouth of Tinker Hollow is 1,358 feet (414 m) above sea level. The elevation near the stream's source is 1,620 feet (490 m) above sea level.

The surficial geology alongside Tinker Hollow in its lower and middle reaches mainly consists of alluvium. However, in its upper reaches, it mostly consists of a till known as Wisconsinan Till. There is also a small patch of Wisconsinan Ice-Stratified Drift in the middle reaches and a larger one near the headwaters. The surficial geology on the sides of the valley mainly consists of Wisconsinan Till, with a small lake above the headwaters and one patch of bedrock consisting of sandstone and shale on the Tinker Hill side of the valley.

Tinker Hollow is not designated as an impaired waterbody.

== Watershed and biology ==
The watershed of Tinker Hollow has an area of 1.33 square miles (3.4 km^{2}). The stream is entirely within the United States Geological Survey quadrangle of Clifford. Its mouth is located near Burdick Corners.

A lake known as Coterell Lake is at the headwaters of an unnamed tributary to Tinker Hollow. It has an area of approximately 22 acres (8.9 ha).

Wild trout naturally reproduce in Tinker Hollow from its headwaters downstream to its mouth. The designated use of the stream is aquatic life.

== History ==
The valley of Tinker Hollow was entered into the Geographic Names Information System on August 2, 1979. Its identifier in the Geographic Names Information System is 1189585. The stream does not have an official name of its own, but instead unofficially takes the name of the valley through which it flows.

There is or was a resort community on Lake Coterell, in the watershed of Tinker Hollow.

== See also ==
- List of rivers of Pennsylvania
