= East Branch Tunkhannock Creek =

Physical characteristics
- Source
  - location: side of East Mountain in Gibson Township, Susquehanna County, Pennsylvania
  - elevation: 1,953 ft (595 m)
- Mouth
  - location: Tunkhannock Creek in Lenox Township, Susquehanna County, Pennsylvania near Glenwood
  - coordinates: 41°38′45″N 75°43′03″W
  - elevation: 764 ft (233 m)
- Length: 19 mi (31 km)
- Width
  - average: 30 to 35 feet (9.1 to 10.7 m)

Basin features
- Progression: Tunkhannock Creek → Susquehanna River → Chesapeake Bay
- Tributaries
  - left: Little Creek, Tinker Creek, Dundaff Creek
  - right: Idlewild Creek

East Branch Tunkhannock Creek is a tributary of Tunkhannock Creek in Susquehanna County, Pennsylvania, in the United States. It is approximately 19 miles (31 km) long and flows through Gibson Township, Herrick Township, Clifford Township, and Lenox Township, Susquehanna County, Pennsylvania. The watershed of the creek has an area of 68.3 square miles (177 km^{2}). The creek has four named tributaries: Little Creek, Tinker Creek, Dundaff Creek, and Idlewild Creek. It is not designated as an impaired waterbody and is a freestone stream in its upper reaches. The topography of the watershed has been described as "rough and hilly".

Numerous small lakes and swamps occur in the watershed of East Branch Tunkhannock Creek. These include Handsome Pond, Robinson Lake, Harding Pond, Tamarack Swamp, Tea Pond, two lakes named Mud Pond, Idlewild Lake, and Coterell Lake. In the early 1900s, major industries in the watershed included agriculture and a summer resort. A number of bridges have been constructed over the creek. The drainage basin of East Branch Tunkhannock Creek is designated as a Coldwater Fishery and a Migratory Fishery both above and below the confluence of Dundaff Creek. Both wild and stocked trout occur in various reaches of the creek.

== Course ==
East Branch Tunkhannock Creek begins on the side of East Mountain in Gibson Township. It flows south-southeast for a few tenths of a mile, entering Herrick Township. Here, it turns east before passing through a pond and flowing south-southeast. After several tenths of a mile, the creek turns east-northeast before turning southeast for several tenths of a mile. It then turns south-southeast for more than a mile, entering Clifford Township. Here, the creek turns south-southwest and receives the tributary Little Creek from the left before turning west-southwest. After several tenths of a mile, it turns southwest for a few miles, receiving the tributary Tinker Creek from the left. The creek eventually turns west-southwest for several tenths of a mile before turning south-southwest for several tenths of a mile, receiving the tributary Dundaff Creek from the left and turning northwest. After several tenths of a mile, it crosses US Route 11 and receives the tributary Idlewild Creek from the right.

Some distance after receiving Idlewild Creek, East Branch Tunkhannock Creek turns west-northwest for several tenths of a mile, crossing Pennsylvania Route 374 before turning west-southwest for a few miles, flowing alongside Pennsylvania Route 374 and eventually turning south-southwest crossing Interstate 81. A few tenths of a mile further downstream, the creek turns north-northwest for several tenths of a mile before turning southwest and then in a westerly direction. After several tenths of a mile, it turns southwest, crossing Pennsylvania Route 374 before turning west. After a few tenths of a mile, it crosses Pennsylvania Route 407, and several tenths of a mile further downstream, it reaches its confluence with Tunkhannock Creek, giving way to a delta in its final several hundred feet.

East Branch Tunkhannock Creek is approximately 19 miles (31 km) long. It joins Tunkhannock Creek 20.10 miles (32.35 km) upstream of its mouth.

=== Tributaries ===
East Branch Tunkhannock Creek has four named tributaries: Little Creek, Tinker Creek, Dundaff Creek, and Idlewild Creek. Little Creek joins East Branch Tunkhannock Creek 13.78 miles (22.18 km) upstream of its mouth, near Elkdale, and drains an area of 4.56 square miles (11.8 km^{2}). Tinker Creek joins East Branch Tunkhannock Creek 11.80 miles (18.99 km) upstream of its mouth, within 1 mile (1.6 km) of Elkdale, and drains an area of 5.02 square miles (13.0 km^{2}). Dundaff Creek joins East Branch Tunkhannock Creek 8.16 miles (13.13 km) upstream of its mouth, within 1 mile (1.6 km) of Clifford, and drains an area of 10.3 square miles (27 km^{2}). Idlewild Creek joins East Branch Tunkhannock Creek 7.50 miles (12.07 km) upstream of its mouth, within 1 mile (1.6 km) of Royal, and drains an area of 8.14 square miles (21.1 km^{2}).

== Hydrology and climate ==
East Branch Tunkhannock Creek is not designated as an impaired waterbody. The water of the creek tends to be cooler than that of either South Branch Tunkhannock Creek or the main stem of Tunkhannock Creek.

In the early 1900s, the annual rate of precipitation in the watershed of East Branch Tunkhannock Creek was typically 35 to 40 inches (89 to 102 cm) per.

== Geography and geology ==
The elevation near the mouth of East Branch Tunkhannock Creek is 764 feet (233 m) above sea level. The elevation near the creek's source is 1,953 feet (595 m) above sea level. Between 1,400 and 1,200 feet (430 and 370 m) above sea level, a distance of 3 miles (4.8 km), it descends at a rate of 66.7 feet per mile (12.63 m/km). From that point to the creek's mouth, a distance of 10.5 miles (16.9 km), it descends at a rate of 39.0 feet per mile (7.39 m/km). The creek is typically approximately 30 to 35 feet (9.1 to 10.7 m) wide.

The topography of the watershed of East Branch Tunkhannock Creek has been described as "rough and hilly". The creek's valley is narrow and is surrounded by steep hills whose tops have been rounded by the actions of glaciers. Numerous small lakes and swamps dot the watershed. The creek's channel is sinuous and flows through sandstone and glacial drift.

Elk Mountain, the highest point in the watershed of Tunkhannock Creek, is in the eastern part of the watershed of East Branch Tunkhannock Creek. It has a peak elevation of 2,680 feet (820 m) above sea level. The creek is a freestone stream in its upper reaches.

There are numerous ponds, lakes, and swamps in the watershed of East Branch Tunkhannock Creek, mostly situated on various tributaries. These include Handsome Pond, Robinson Lake, Harding Pond, Tamarack Swamp, Tea Pond, two lakes named Mud Pond, Idlewild Lake, and Coterell Lake, and dozens of unnamed ones.

== Watershed ==
The watershed of East Branch Tunkhannock Creek has an area of 68.3 square miles (177 km^{2}). The mouth of the creek is in the United States Geological Survey quadrangle of Lenoxville. However, its source is in the quadrangle of Clifford. The mouth of the creek is situated approximately 0.5 miles (0.80 km) south of Glenwood. The creek's watershed is situated in southern Susquehanna County and northern Lackawanna County. It is mostly in Susquehanna County, but a few of the southern reaches extend into northern Lackawanna County.

The watershed of East Branch Tunkhannock Creek is situated in the east-central portion of the Tunkhannock Creek watershed. Interstate 81 passes through the western portion of the watershed of East Branch Tunkhannock Creek.

== History and recreation ==
East Branch Tunkhannock Creek was entered into the Geographic Names Information System on August 2, 1979. Its identifier in the Geographic Names Information System is 1173778.

A "crossroads hamlet" known as Clifford is situated in the vicinity of East Branch Tunkhannock Creek. The area was settled by Adam Miller in 1800.

In the early 1900s, major industries in the watershed of East Branch Tunkhannock Creek included agriculture and a summer resort. The creek also served as water power for a small mill at Dundaff. During this time period, settlements in the watershed included Clifford (216 people), Dundaff (150 people) and Lenoxville (126 people).

A prestressed box beam or girders bridge carrying T-460 over East Branch Tunkhannock Creek 2 miles (3.2 km) southwest of Lenoxville was repaired in 1981 and is 70.9 feet (21.6 m) long. A three-span bridge of the same type, but carrying State Route 2021, was built across the creek in Lenox Township in 1965 and is 154.9 feet (47.2 m) long. A two-span bridge of the same type, but carrying Pennsylvania Route 374, was constructed over the creek in Clifford Township in the same year and is 86.9 feet (26.5 m) long.

There is little angling pressure on East Branch Tunkhannock Creek and there is sufficient room for casting. A walking/biking trail is in the vicinity of the creek in Clifford Township.

== Biology ==
The drainage basin of East Branch Tunkhannock above Dundaff Creek is designated as a Coldwater Fishery and a Migratory Fishery. The drainage basin of the creek below Dundaff Creek also has these designations, as does Dundaff Creek itself. A segment of East Branch Tunkhannock Creek is classified by the Pennsylvania Fish and Boat Commission as Class B Wild Trout Waters. Brook trout have been observed in the creek.

Wild trout naturally reproduce in East Branch Tunkhannock Creek from its headwaters downstream to Pennsylvania Route 374, a distance of 17.25 miles (27.76 km). The creek is also stocked with trout. In 2016, April 16 was the opening day for trout fishing.

In the upper part of the East Branch Tunkhannock Creek watershed, 89.5 percent of the watersheds have a Habitat Quality Index (the maximum probability of finding brook trout in a zero-stress situation) of at least 0.50.

== See also ==
- Utley Brook, next tributary of Tunkhannock Creek going downstream
- Millard Creek, next tributary of Tunkhannock Creek going upstream
- List of rivers of Pennsylvania
