= Pennsylvania Route 167 =

State highway in Susquehanna County, Pennsylvania, US

Pennsylvania Route 167

Route information
- Maintained by PennDOT
- Length: 28.7 mi (46.2 km)

Major junctions
- South end: US 11 in Hop Bottom
- PA 706 from Tiffany to Montrose; PA 29 in Montrose
- North end: Silver Lake Road at New York state border near Brackney

Location
- Country: United States
- State: Pennsylvania
- Counties: Susquehanna

Highway system
- Pennsylvania State Route System; Interstate; US; State; Scenic; Legislative
| ← PA 166 | → PA 168 |

Pennsylvania Route 167 (PA 167) is a 28.7-mile-long (46.2 km) state highway located in Susquehanna County in Pennsylvania. The southern terminus is at U.S. Route 11 (US 11) in Hop Bottom. The northern terminus is at Silver Lake Road at the New York state border near Brackney.

== Route description ==
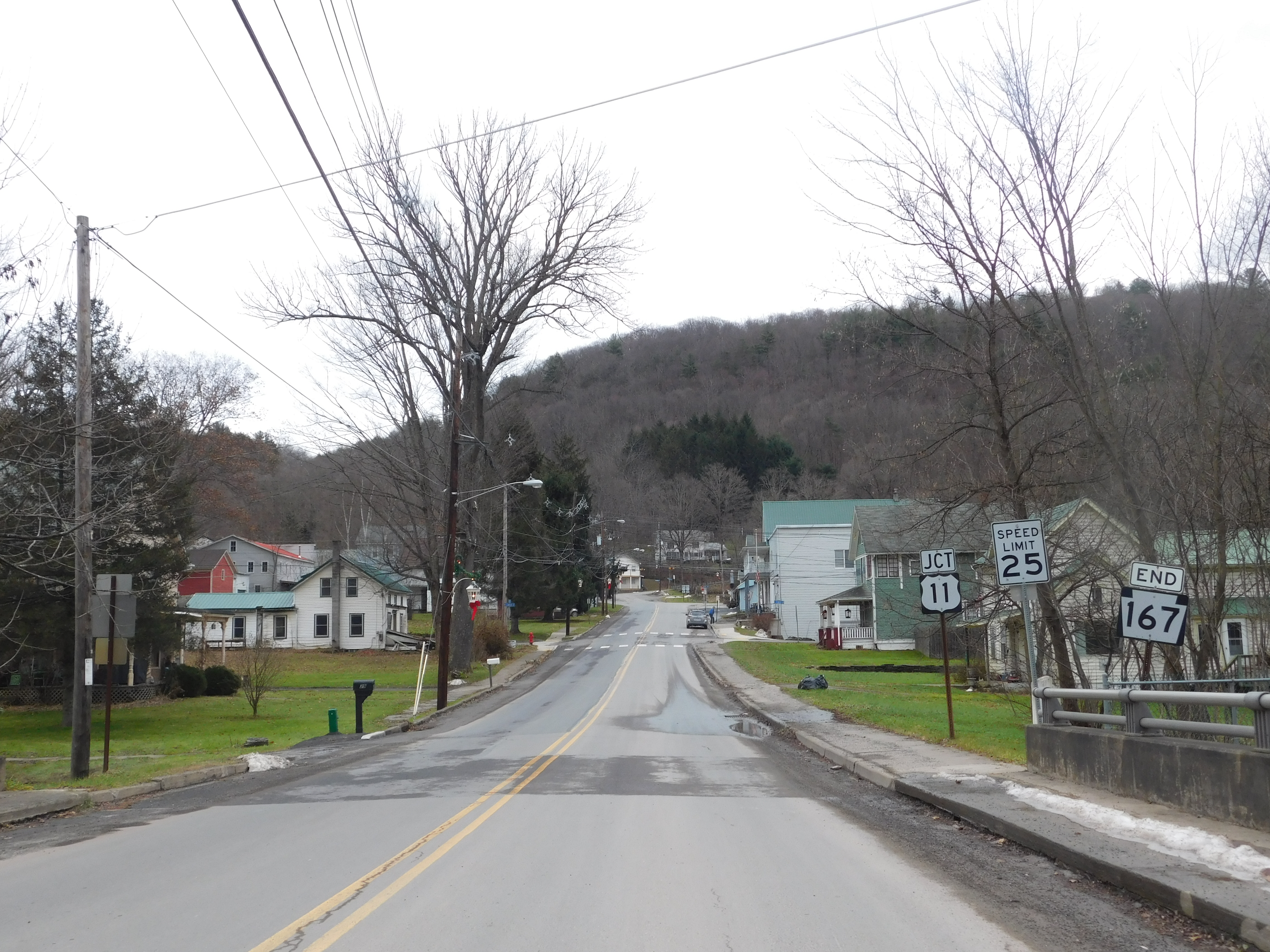
PA 167 southbound approaching its southern terminus with US 11 in Hop Bottom

PA 167 begins at an intersection with US 11 in the borough of Hop Bottom, heading west on two-lane undivided Main Street. The route passes homes and businesses, turning northwest onto Greenwood Street. The road heads through fields and woods with some homes before crossing into Lathrop Township. Here, PA 167 heads northwest as an unnamed road, passing through forested areas with a few residences and occasional fields as it enters Brooklyn Township. The road heads through farmland and woodland with some homes, passing through the community of Brooklyn. The route turns to the north before heading northeast into more forested areas with some small fields and residences. PA 167 curves north again and runs through more rural areas, heading north-northwest into Bridgewater Township. The road enters more agricultural areas with some woods and homes, turning to the northwest. The route comes to an intersection with PA 706 in Tiffany, turning west to form a concurrency with that route. The two routes wind west through woodland with residential and commercial establishments. The road heads through more developed areas as it comes to an intersection with PA 29. Here, PA 167 and PA 706 turn southwest to join PA 29, passing businesses and crossing into the borough of Montrose. At this point, the road becomes Grow Avenue and passes homes. The three routes curve northwest onto Church Street and pass through more residential areas before heading into the commercial downtown of Montrose. Here, PA 29 splits southwest onto South Main Street and PA 167/PA 706 continues northwest, heading back into residential areas and turning southwest onto Wyalusing Avenue.

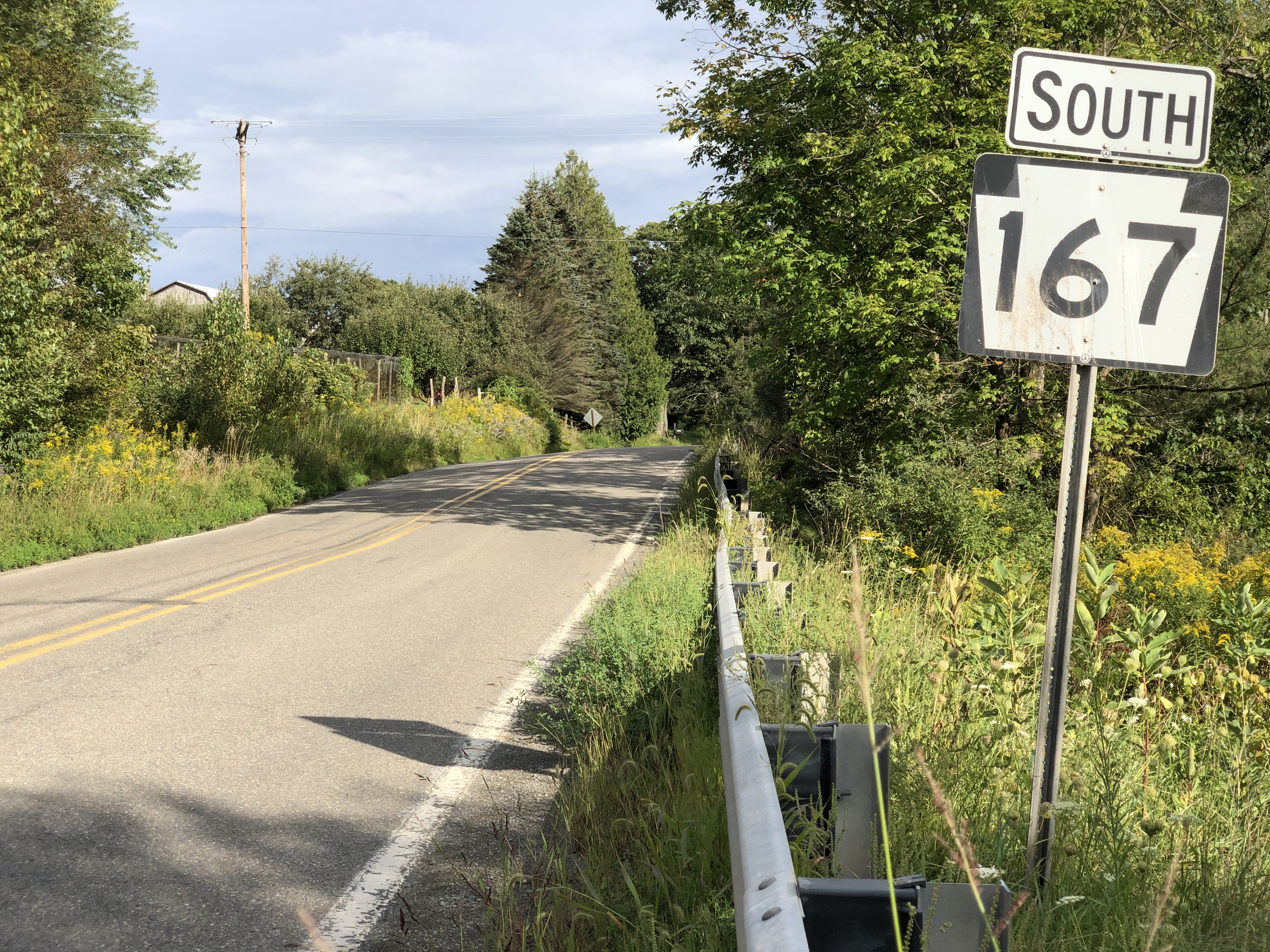
PA 167 southbound in Silver Lake Township

PA 167 splits from PA 706 by turning north onto Owego Street, curving northwest into rural areas of fields with trees lining the road. The route heads back into Bridgewater Township and becomes unnamed again, turning north as it runs through a mix of farmland and woodland with some homes. The road turns west before heading back into the north as it continues through more rural areas. PA 167 briefly follows Holbrook Road before becoming unnamed again and passing through Fisk Mill prior to crossing into Silver Lake Township. The road turns northwest and passes through more woodland with some farm fields and residences, curving to the north. The route heads northwest again and passes to the east of Silver Lake. PA 167 enters more forested areas with some homes and curves to the north. Farther north, the road runs through woodland with some farm fields and residences. PA 167 ends at the New York border, where the road continues north a short distance into Broome County as Silver Lake Road to end at CR 117 (Hawleyton Road).

== Major intersections ==
The entire route is in Susquehanna County.

| Location | mi | km | Destinations | Notes |
|---|---|---|---|---|
| Hop Bottom | 0.0 | 0.0 | US 11 (Lackawanna Trail) – New Milford, Nicholson | |
| Bridgewater Township | 11.2 | 18.0 | PA 706 east – New Milford | South end of PA 706 overlap |
| Bridgewater Township | 13.4 | 21.6 | PA 29 north – Binghamton | South end of PA 29 overlap |
| Montrose | 14.6 | 23.5 | PA 29 south (South Main Street) – Tunkhannock | North end of PA 29 overlap |
| Montrose | 14.8 | 23.8 | PA 706 west (Wyalusing Street) | North end of PA 706 overlap |
| Silver Lake Township | 28.7 | 46.2 | Silver Lake Road to CR 117 (Hawleyton Road) – Binghamton, Vestal Center | New York border |
1.000 mi = 1.609 km; 1.000 km = 0.621 mi: Concurrency terminus
