= Hop Bottom Creek =

Hop Bottom Creek Hopbottom Creek
- Etymology: wild hops that historically grew in its valley

Physical characteristics
- Source
  - location: unnamed lake near Pennsylvania Route 706 in Bridgewater Township, Susquehanna County, Pennsylvania
  - elevation: between 1,560 and 1,580 feet (475 and 482 m)
- Mouth
  - location: Martins Creek in Hop Bottom, Susquehanna County, Pennsylvania
  - coordinates: 41°42′49″N 75°46′11″W
  - elevation: 883 ft (269 m)
- Length: 13.5 mi (21.7 km)
- Basin size: 15.6 mi^{2} (40 km^{2})
- Discharge
  - average: 7.2 cu ft/s (0.20 m^{3}/s)

Basin features
- Progression: Martins Creek → Tunkhannock Creek → Susquehanna River → Chesapeake Bay

Hop Bottom Creek (also known as Hopbottom Creek) is a tributary of Martins Creek in Susquehanna County, Pennsylvania, in the United States. It is approximately 13.5 miles (21.7 km) long and flows through Bridgewater Township, New Milford Township, Brooklyn Township, Lathrop Township, and Hop Bottom. The watershed of the creek has an area of 15.6 square miles (40 km^{2}). The creek is not designated as an impaired waterbody. It is a relatively small stream with a deep valley. In its upper reaches it is approximately 10 feet (3.0 m) wide. The surficial geology in the creek's vicinity mainly consists of Wisconsinan Till, alluvium, bedrock, and wetlands.

The watershed of Hop Bottom Creek is relatively long in a north–south direction and narrow in an east–west direction. The area in the vicinity of the creek was settled by 1787. The first gristmill in Susquehanna County was built on the creek. A number of bridges have also been constructed over it. The creek is not stocked with trout, but does have angling opportunities.

== Course ==
Hop Bottom Creek begins in an unnamed lake near Pennsylvania Route 706 in Bridgewater Township. It flows south-southwest into Heart Lake, which is in both Bridgewater Township and New Milford Township. From the southern end of the lake, the creek flows west and then southwest in Bridgewater Township, entering Lake Chrisann after a few tenths of a mile. From the southern end of this lake, the creek flows south-southeast and then south-southwest for several tenths of a mile before turning west-southwest for a few tenths of a mile. It then turns in a south-southwesterly direction for more than a mile, approaching Pennsylvania Route 167 (which it crosses a number of times) and entering Brooklyn Township. After some distance in Brooklyn Township, the creek turns southeast for several tenths of a mile before turning south-southwest and then south-southwest. After some distance, the creek gradually begins meandering southwest for more than a mile before meandering south-southeast and southeast for a few miles, still flowing alongside Pennsylvania Route 167. The creek then turns south for more than a mile, entering Lathrop Township. Here, it turns southeast for several tenths of a mile, entering Hop Bottom and crossing Pennsylvania Route 167 for the last time. At this point, it turns east-northeast, reentering Lathrop Township and reaching its confluence with Martins Creek.

Hop Bottom Creek joins Martins Creek 7.32 miles (11.78 km) upstream of its mouth.

== Hydrology ==
Hop Bottom Creek is not designated as an impaired waterobdy.

Between 1965 and 1969, the discharge of Hop Bottom Creek at Brooklyn ranged from 0.50 to 20 cubic feet per second (0.014 to 0.566 m^{3}/s) during seven measurements, with an average of 7.2 cubic feet per second (0.20 m^{3}/s). The water temperature of the creek ranged from 5.5 to 16.5 °C (41.9 to 61.7 °F) during six measurements. The creek's pH ranged from 6.5 to 7.5 and its specific conductance ranged from 95 to 149 micro-siemens per centimeter.

Between 1968 and 1969, the concentrations of magnesium and calcium in the filtered waters of Hop Bottom Creek at Brooklyn ranged from 2.40 to 3.50 milligrams per liter (0.00240 to 0.00350 oz/cu ft) and 11.0 to 19.0 milligrams per liter (0.0110 to 0.0190 oz/cu ft), respectively. Between 1965 and 1967, the concentration of sodium ranged from 4.40 to 6.20 milligrams per liter (0.00439 to 0.00619 oz/cu ft).

Between 1965 and 1969, the concentration of carbon dioxide in Hop Bottom Creek at Brooklyn ranged from 1.8 to 15 milligrams per liter (0.0018 to 0.0150 oz/cu ft) and the bicarbonate concentration ranged from 20 to 58 milligrams per liter (0.020 to 0.058 oz/cu ft). The concentration of water hardness in the creek ranged from 35 to 64 milligrams per liter (0.035 to 0.064 oz/cu ft). The sulfate and chloride concentrations in the creek's filtered water ranged from 12.0 to 17.0 milligrams per liter (0.0120 to 0.0170 oz/cu ft) and 7.0 to 10.0 milligrams per liter (0.0070 to 0.0100 oz/cu ft). The concentration of nitrate in the creek's filtered waters ranged from 0.70 to 2.10 milligrams per liter (0.00070 to 0.00210 oz/cu ft).

== Geography and geology ==
The elevation near the mouth of Hop Bottom Creek is 883 feet (269 m) above sea level. The elevation of the creek's source is between 1,560 and 1,580 feet (475 and 482 m) above sea level.

Hop Bottom Creek is a relatively small stream that meanders through a deep valley. In its upper reaches, it has a clean channel. At the outlet of Heart Lake, the creek's channel is 10 feet (3.0 m) wide and 1 foot (0.30 m) deep. The headwaters of Hop Bottom Creek are in a beaded valley, with alternating broad and narrow segments. Wetlands or lakes sometimes occur in the broad parts.

The surficial geology along the lower reaches of Hop Bottom Creek mainly consists of alluvium. However, a till known as Wisconsinan Till is found nearby in larger areas, and some bedrock consisting of sandstone and shale is also present. Additionally, there is one wetland patch nearby. The surficial geology in the creek's headwaters is fairly similar, but there is no alluvium above Lake Chrisann, only Wisconsinan Till.

Soils in the vicinity of Hop Bottom Creek include Wyalusing silt loam, Holly silt loam, Wellsboro channery silt, and Lordstown and Oquaga stony silt loams. The first two of these are hydric, the third is mostly non-hydric, and the fourth is non-hydric.

A mitigation bank project on Hop Bottom Creek and some of its unnamed tributaries was proposed in 2015. Oxbow scars in the floodplain of the creek indicate that the creek's channel has moved around its valley over time.

== Watershed ==
The watershed of Hop Bottom Creek has an area of 15.6 square miles (40 km^{2}). The mouth of the creek is in the United States Geological Survey quadrangle of Hop Bottom. However, its source is in the quadrangle of Montrose East. The creek's watershed is relatively long and narrow. It is in the vicinity of the watersheds of West Branch Meshoppen Creek, Horton Creek, Martins Creek, Salt Lick Creek, and Snake Creek.

A lake known as Heart Lake is situated on Hop Bottom Creek. It has an area of 43.6 acres (17.6 ha) and has no dam. The creek's watershed is relatively sparsely populated.

The designated use for Hop Bottom Creek is aquatic life. There is a United States Geological Survey gauging station on the creek at Brooklyn. The portion of the creek's watershed that is upstream of this point has an area of 11.7 square miles (30 km^{2}).

The valley of Hop Bottom Creek was cultivated by the early 1900s. There are active farming operations in the vicinity of the creek.

== History ==
Hop Bottom Creek was entered into the Geographic Names Information System on August 2, 1979. Its identifier in the Geographic Names Information System is 1177377. The creek is also known as Hopbottom Creek. This variant name appears in a 1981 highway map of Susquehanna County, created by the Pennsylvania Department of Transportation. The creek is named for the wild hops that historically grew within its valley. The creek's name has been described as "quaint".

The community of Hop Bottom, which is located near Hop Bottom Creek, was established in 1787. The first gristmill in Susquehanna County was constructed on Hop Bottom Creek. There was historically a cotton factory in the vicinity of the creek.

A concrete tee beam bridge carrying Pennsylvania Route 167 over Hop Bottom Creek was built in Bridgewater Township in 1939 and is 30.8 feet (9.4 m) long. A steel stringer/multi-beam or girder bridge carrying State Route 2015 over Hop Bottom Creek was built in 1945 and was repaired in 1993. It is 43.0 feet (13.1 m) long and is in Brooklyn Township. A two-span concrete tee beam bridge carrying State Route 2024 over the creek was built in that township in 1947 and is 65.0 feet (19.8 m) long. A concrete culvert bridge carrying State Route 2015 over the creek was built in 1959 and repaired in 1998. It is in Bridgewater Township and is 21.0 feet (6.4 m) long. A two-span prestressed box beam or girders bridge carrying Pennsylvania Route 167 was constructed across the creek in 1961 in Brooklyn Township and is 66.9 feet (20.4 m) long. A prestressed box beam or girders bridge carrying Pennsylvania Route 167 across the creek was built in Hop Bottom in 1962 and is 43.0 feet (13.1 m) long. A prestressed box beam or girders bridge carrying T554/Quicks Hill Road over the creek was built 1.1 miles (1.8 km) southeast of Brooklyn in 1969 and is 32.2 feet (9.8 m) long.

== Biology ==
Hop Bottom Creek is designated as a Coldwater Fishery. Hop Bottom Creek was described as having "excellent" fishing opportunities in the Tunkhannock Creek Watershed Conservation Plan in 1998. However, the creek is not stocked with trout. Eels have historically been observed in the creek.

Historically, wild hops grew on the banks of the creek near the community of Hop Bottom. One of the largest blocks of unfragmented forest is on the banks of the creek.

== See also ==
- Dry Creek (Martins Creek), next tributary of Martins Creek going upstream
- List of rivers of Pennsylvania
