= Tinker Creek (East Branch Tunkhannock Creek tributary) =

Physical characteristics
- Source
  - location: unnamed lake near Lackawanna Mountain in Clifford Township, Susquehanna County, Pennsylvania
  - elevation: 1,899 feet (579 m)
- Mouth
  - location: East Branch Tunkhannock Creek in Clifford Township, Susquehanna County, Pennsylvania near Elkdale
  - coordinates: 41°40′57″N 75°33′12″W
  - elevation: 1,194 feet (364 m)
- Length: 4.3 mi (6.9 km)
- Basin size: 5.02 sq mi (13.0 km^{2})

Basin features
- Progression: East Branch Tunkhannock Creek → Tunkhannock Creek → Susquehanna River → Chesapeake Bay
- Tributaries
  - left: one unnamed tributary
  - right: one unnamed tributary

Tinker Creek is a tributary of East Branch Tunkhannock Creek in Susquehanna County, Pennsylvania, in the United States. It is approximately 4.3 miles (6.9 km) long and flows through Clifford Township. The watershed of the creek has an area of 5.02 square miles (13.0 km^{2}). The creek is not designated as an impaired waterbody and has no named tributaries. It is classified as Class A Wild Trout Waters.

== Course ==
Tinker Creek begins in an unnamed lake near Lackawanna Mountain in Clifford Township. It flows south-southwest for a few tenths of a mile before turning west and entering a wetland. Here, the creek turns north for several tenths of a mile before receiving an unnamed tributary from the right and turning west-northwest. After a few tenths of a mile, it receives an unnamed tributary from the left and turns north-northwest for several tenths of a mile before heading in a westerly direction for more than a mile. The creek then turns northwest, and after a short distance, reaches its confluence with East Branch Tunkhannock Creek.

Tinker Creek is approximately 4.3 miles (6.9 km) long. The creek joins East Branch Tunkhannock Creek 11.80 miles (18.99 km) upstream of its mouth.

== Hydrology ==
Tinker Creek is not designated as an impaired waterbody. The alkalinity concentration of the creek is 28 milligrams per liter (0.028 oz/cu ft).

== Geography and geology ==
The elevation near the mouth of Tinker Creek is 1,194 feet (364 m) above sea level. The elevation near the creek's source is 1,899 feet (579 m) above sea level.

The surficial geology along Tinker Creek in its lower reaches mainly includes a till known as Wisconsnain Till. Further upstream, the surficial geology along the creek consists mostly of alluvium, though there are various patches of Wisconsinnan Till, Wisconsinan Ice-Contact Stratified Drift, wetlands, lakes, and bedrock consisting of sandstone and shale. In the upper reaches, the surficial geology is mostly Wisconsinan Till, with some alluvium and wetland.

Tinker Creek has been described as a small creek.

== Watershed ==
The watershed of Tinker Creek has an area of 5.02 square miles (13.0 km^{2}). The mouth of the creek is in the United States Geological Survey quadrangle of Clifford. However, its source is in the quadrangle of Forest City. The creek's mouth is located within 1 mile (1.6 km) of Elkdale.

The designated use for Tinker Creek is aquatic life.

== History ==
Tinker Creek was entered into the Geographic Names Information System on August 2, 1979. Its identifier in the Geographic Names Information System is 1189583. The creek is also known as Tinker Brook. This variant name appears in a 1981 map of Susquehanna County created by the Pennsylvania Department of Transportation.

In around 1800, David Burns settled near Tinker Creek on a road leading to Belmont. In about 1802, three brothers named Abner, Daniel, and Lemuel Norton settled near a road crossing the creek.

A steel stringer/multi-beam or girder bridge carrying State Route 2012 over Tinker Creek was built in Clifford Township in 1941 and is 37.1 feet (11.3 m) long. In 2013, this bridge was slated to be given a weight restriction of 25 tons (or 34 tons for combination loads).

== Biology ==
Wild trout naturally reproduce in Tinker Creek from its upper reaches downstream to its mouth. The creek is classified by the Pennsylvania Fish and Boat Commission as Class A Wild Trout Waters for brook trout from its upper reaches downstream to its mouth.

The drainage basin of Tinker Creek is classified as a Coldwater Fishery. However, its existing use is as a High-Quality Coldwater Fishery.

== See also ==
- Dundaff Creek, next tributary of East Branch Tunkhannock Creek going downstream
- Little Creek (East Branch Tunkhannock Creek), next tributary of East Branch Tunkhannock Creek going upstream
- List of rivers of Pennsylvania
