= Idlewild Creek =

Physical characteristics
- Source
  - location: foot of a mountain near the northern border of Clifford Township, Susquehanna County, Pennsylvania
  - elevation: 1,457 feet (444 m)
- Mouth
  - location: East Branch Tunkhannock Creek in Clifford Township, Susquehanna County, Pennsylvania near Royal
  - coordinates: 41°39′48″N 75°36′44″W
  - elevation: 1,017 feet (310 m)
- Length: 5.1 mi (8.2 km)
- Basin size: 8.14 mi^{2} (21.1 km^{2})

Basin features
- Progression: East Branch Tunkhannock Creek → Tunkhannock Creek → Susquehanna River → Chesapeake Bay
- Tributaries
  - left: two unnamed tributaries
  - right: one unnamed tributary

Idlewild Creek is a tributary of East Branch Tunkhannock Creek in Susquehanna County, Pennsylvania, in the United States. It is approximately 5.1 miles (8.2 km) long and flows through Clifford Township. The watershed of the creek has an area of 8.14 square miles (21.1 km^{2}). The creek is not designated as an impaired waterbody and has no named tributaries. A 68.4 acres (27.7 ha) lake known as Lake Idlewild is located in the creek's watershed. Wild trout naturally reproduce in the creek.

== Course ==
Idlewild Creek begins near the northern border of Clifford Township, at the foot of a mountain. It flows southwest for a short distance before entering a wetland and turning west. Upon exiting the wetland, the creek turns southwest for several tenths of a mile, entering Lake Idlewild, where it receives an unnamed tributary from the right. From the southern end of the lake, it flows south for a short distance before turning southeast for a few tenths of a mile. The creek then enters a wetland where it receives an unnamed tributary from the left and turns south. After several tenths of a mile, it receives another unnamed tributary from the left and passes near another wetland, turning south-southwest for more than a mile. The creek then turns west for a short distance before reaching its confluence with East Branch Tunkhannock Creek.

Idlewild Creek is approximately 5.1 miles (8.2 km) long. The creek joins East Branch Tunkhannock Creek 7.50 miles (12.07 km) upstream of its mouth.

== Hydrology, geography and geology ==
The elevation near the mouth of Idlewild Creek is 1,017 feet (310 m) above sea level. The elevation near the creek's source is 1,457 feet (444 m) above sea level.

The surficial geology along the lower reaches of Idlewild Creek consists mainly of alluvium, although a till known as Wisconsinan Till is more prevalent on the sides of the valley, and occurs along the creek itself at times. There are also a few wetland patches and one patch of Wisconsinan Ice-Contact Stratified Drift. Further upstream, the surficial geology is mostly Wisconsinan Till, except for Lake Idlewild, a wetland, and some patches of bedrock consisting of sandstone and shale on nearby hills.

A 68.4-acre (27.7 ha) lake known as Lake Idlewild is located in the watershed of Idlewild Creek. The designated uses of the lake are aquatic life and potable water.

Idlewild Creek is not designated as an impaired waterbody.

== Watershed ==
The watershed of Idlewild Creek has an area of 8.14 square miles (21.1 km^{2}). The creek is entirely within the United States Geological Survey quadrangle of Clifford. Its mouth is located within 1 mile (1.6 km) of Royal.

Williams Field Services Company, LLC. has been issued a permit to build, maintain, and operate a 20-inch (51 cm) natural gas pipeline crossing one or more unnamed tributaries of Idlewild Creek. The creek is one of the receiving streams for an Erosion and Sediment Control permit.

== History ==
Idlewild Creek was entered into the Geographic Names Information System on August 2, 1979. Its identifier in the Geographic Names Information System is 1177685.

== Biology ==
Wild trout naturally reproduce in the lower 3.29 miles (5.29 km) of Idlewild Creek. The creek is classified as a Coldwater Fishery and a Migratory Fishery.

The designated use for Idlewild Creek is aquatic life.

== See also ==
- Dundaff Creek, next tributary of East Branch Tunkhannock Creek going upstream
- List of rivers of Pennsylvania
