= Dundaff Creek =

Physical characteristics
- Source
  - location: wetland in Clifford Township, Susquehanna County, Pennsylvania
  - elevation: 1,776 feet (541 m)
- Mouth
  - location: East Branch Tunkhannock Creek in Clifford Township, Susquehanna County, Pennsylvania at Clifford
  - coordinates: 41°39′26″N 75°36′13″W
  - elevation: 1,037 feet (316 m)
- Length: 6.7 mi (10.8 km)
- Basin size: 10.3 mi^{2} (27 km^{2})

Basin features
- Progression: East Branch Tunkhannock Creek → Tunkhannock Creek → Susquehanna River → Chesapeake Bay
- Tributaries
  - left: five unnamed tributaries
  - right: three unnamed tributaries

Dundaff Creek is a tributary of East Branch Tunkhannock Creek in Susquehanna County and Lackawanna County, in Pennsylvania, in the United States. It is approximately 6.7 miles (10.8 km) long and flows through Clifford Township in Susquehanna County and Greenfield Township in Lackawanna County. The watershed of the creek has an area of 10.3 square miles (27 km^{2}). The creek has no named tributaries and is not designated as an impaired waterbody.

The valley of Dundaff Creek has is relatively deep and not very asymmetric. Flooding has occurred along the creek, and has occasionally impacted the community of Clifford. Communities along the creek include Clifford and Dundaff. A number of bridges have been constructed over Dundaff Creek in both Susquehanna County and Lackawanna County. The watershed of the creek is designated as a Coldwater Fishery and a Migratory Fishery except for the watershed of an unnamed tributary, which is designated as a Warmwater Fishery and a Migratory Fishery. Wild trout naturally reproduce in the creek and there are wetlands at its headwaters, which are listed on the Susquehanna County Natural Areas Inventory.

== Course ==
Dundaff Creek begins in a wetland in Clifford Township, Susquehanna County. It flows northwest for a few tenths of a mile before turning west-southwest and entering another wetland. After a few tenths of a mile, the creek turns southwest for several tenths of a mile, receiving one unnamed tributary from the left before entering a third wetland, where it receives an unnamed tributary from the right. It continues flowing southwest before crossing Pennsylvania Route 247 and turning west-southwest for a few tenths of a mile, receiving one unnamed tributary from the left and one from the right. The creek then turns south-southwest for several tenths of a mile, exiting Susquehanna County.

Upon exiting Susquehanna County, Dundaff Creek enters Greenfield Township, Lackawanna County. It flows south for a few tenths of a mile before gradually turning west, beginning to flow alongside Pennsylvania Route 106 as it receives two more unnamed tributaries (one from the left and one from the right) before crossing the highway. The creek then turns north-northwest for a few tenths of a mile alongside Pennsylvania Route 106 before turning west-southwest. After several tenths of a mile, it turns north, receiving an unnamed tributary from the left and reentering Clifford Township, Susquehanna County. Here, the creek flows north for several tenths of a mile, receiving an unnamed tributary from the left and crossing Pennsylvania Route 106. It then turns northwest for several tenths of a mile before reaching its confluence with East Branch Tunkhannock Creek.

Dundaff Creek is approximately 6.7 miles (10.8 km) long. The creek joins East Branch Tunkhannock Creek 8.16 miles (13.13 km) upstream of its mouth.

== Hydrology ==
Dundaff Creek is not designated as an impaired waterbody.

At the Lackawanna County/Susquehanna County line, the peak annual discharge of Dundaff Creek has a 10 percent chance of reaching 953 cubic feet per second (27.0 m^{3}/s). It has a 2 percent chance of reaching 1,612 cubic feet per second (45.6 m^{3}/s) and a 1 percent chance of reaching 1,946 cubic feet per second (55.1 m^{3}/s). The peak annual discharge has a 0.2 percent chance of reaching 2,869 cubic feet per second (81.2 m^{3}/s).

At a location 2,130 feet (650 m) upstream of Bell Mountain Road, the peak annual discharge of Dundaff Creek has a 10 percent chance of reaching 807 cubic feet per second (22.9 m^{3}/s). It has a 2 percent chance of reaching 1,370 cubic feet per second (39 m^{3}/s) and a 1 percent chance of reaching 1,655 cubic feet per second (46.9 m^{3}/s). The peak annual discharge has a 0.2 percent chance of reaching 2,447 cubic feet per second (69.3 m^{3}/s).

== Geography and geology ==
The elevation near the mouth of Dundaff Creek is 1,037 feet (316 m) above sea level. The elevation near the source of the creek is 1,776 feet (541 m) above sea level.

The valley of Dundaff Creek was one of the most transverse to ice flow during the Ice Age of any stream valley in the United States Geological Survey quadrangle of Clifford. The creek's valley has been described as "deeply incised" and is not very asymmetric. There are very thick layers of till on the north side and bedrock on the south side.

The surficial geology along the lower reaches of Dundaff Creek mainly consists of alluvium, with some patches of wetland and Wisconsinan Outwash nearby and Wisconsinan Till on the side of the valley. Further upstream, the surficial geology along the creek is still predominantly alluvium, but the alluvium band is thinner, with Wisconsinan Till coming much closer to the creek. There are also patches of bedrock consisting of sandstone and shale nearby, as well as a patch of Wisconsinan Outwash, a patch of alluvial fan and a much smaller patch of Wisconsinan Ice-Contact Stratified Drift. Near the creek's headwaters, the surficial geology consists mainly of Wisconsinan Till and bedrock, with some wetlands.

== Watershed ==
The watershed of Dundaff Creek has an area of 10.3 square miles (27 km^{2}). The creek is entirely within the United States Geological Survey quadrangle of Clifford. Its mouth is located within 1 mile (1.6 km) of Clifford and the community of Dundaff is located near the headwaters.

At times, major flooding has caused inundation of some structures in localized areas in the vicinity of Dundaff Creek. The village of Clifford has also been impacted by flooding from the creek at times.

The designated use for Dundaff Creek is aquatic life. The headwaters of the creek are listed on the Susquehanna County Natural Areas Inventory.

The forests surrounding wetlands at the headwaters of Dundaff Creek are fragmented by agricultural land in some areas. There is also accelerating residential development to the south of the wetlands, and many wetlands in Susquehanna County are in danger of being flooded for recreational purposes.

== History ==
Dundaff Creek was entered into the Geographic Names Information System on August 2, 1979. Its identifier in the Geographic Names Information System is 1173604.

A dam known as the Dundaff Dam was constructed on Dundaff Creek in 1956 in Greenfield Township, Lackawanna County. It was privately owned and built by a rod and gun club for recreation purposes. The dam was 7 feet (2.1 m) high and 55 feet (17 m) before it was removed due to its poor condition and silted impoundment. The removal of the dam improved an estimated 5.8 miles (9.3 km) of stream habitat.

A steel stringer/multi-beam or girder bridge carrying State Route 2008 over Dundaff Creek was built in 1951 in Clifford Township, Susquehanna County and is 47.9 feet (14.6 m) long. A prestressed box beam or girders bridge carrying Pennsylvania Route 106 over the creek in the same township was built in 2009 and is 45.9 feet (14.0 m) long. A bridge of the same type and carrying the same road, but in Greenfield Township, Lackawanna County, was built over the creek in 1959 and repaired in 2007; this bridge is 61.0 feet (18.6 m) long. Another bridge of the same type was built over the creek in Greenfield Township for State Route 1013 in 1996 and is 42.0 feet (12.8 m) long.

In 2013, the bridge carrying State Route 2008 (Airport Road) over Dundaff Creek had its weight limit set to 33 tons, or 39 tons for combination loads. This was one of about a thousand bridges in Pennsylvania whose weight limits were changed at that time. A bridge carrying Creamery Road over Dundaff Creek in Clifford Township, Susquehanna County was closed for reconstruction in August 2015 as part of a Public-Private Partnership to repair 558 bridges in Pennsylvania. Although there were several construction delays, the bridge was reopened on March 15, 2016. Two new Pennsylvania-funded bridges carrying Pennsylvania Route 247 over the creek are slated for completion in 2018 and 2020, for a cost of $350,000 and $300,000, respectively.

== Biology ==
The drainage basin of Dundaff Creek is designated as a Coldwater Fishery and a Migratory Fishery except for the watersheds of unnamed tributaries joining the creek 4.39 miles (7.07 km) upstream of its mouth, which are designated as a Warmwater Fishery and a Migratory Fishery. Wild trout naturally reproduce in Dundaff Creek from its headwaters downstream to its mouth.

The wetlands at the headwaters of Dundaff Creek are probably mainly impoundments influenced by beavers, plus the occasional shrub swamp and sedge grass marshes with a northern hardwood matrix. One peatland or bog habitat in the area is surrounded by a large hemlock swamp forest. Additionally, an animal species of concern was observed in the wetlands in 1985.

== See also ==
- Idlewild Creek, next tributary of East Branch Tunkhannock Creek going downstream
- Tinker Creek, next tributary of East Branch Tunkhannock Creek going upstream
- List of rivers of Pennsylvania
