= Utley Brook =

Physical characteristics
- Source
  - location: Lenox Township, Susquehanna County, Pennsylvania
  - elevation: between 1,260 and 1,280 feet (384 and 390 m)
- Mouth
  - location: Tunkhannock Creek in Nicholson Township, Wyoming County, Pennsylvania
  - coordinates: 41°37′53″N 75°44′54″W
  - elevation: 732 ft (223 m)
- Length: 4.5 mi (7.2 km)

Basin features
- Progression: Tunkhannock Creek → Susquehanna River → Chesapeake Bay
- Tributaries
  - right: Willow Brook

Utley Brook is a tributary of Tunkhannock Creek in Susquehanna County and Wyoming County, in Pennsylvania, in the United States. It is approximately 4.5 miles (7.2 km) long and flows through Lenox Township in Susquehanna County and Nicholson Township in Wyoming County. The stream is in the United States Geological Survey quadrangles of Hop Bottom and Lenoxville. The surficial geology in its vicinity consists of Wisconsinan Till, alluvium, bedrock, wetlands, and lakes. The creek is a Coldwater Fishery and a Migratory Fishery. It has one named tributary, which is known as Willow Brook.

== Course ==
Utley Brook begins in Lenox Township, Susquehanna County. It flows south for several tenths of a mile and passes through a wetland before turning southeast. After a few tenths of a mile, the stream turns south for several tenths of a mile before turning south-southwest and passing through another wetland. It then turns south for several tenths of a mile and enters Nicholson Township, Wyoming County. Here, it turns south-southwest for several tenths of a mile, receiving Willow Brook, its only named tributary, from the right. It then crosses Pennsylvania Route 92 and reaches its confluence with Tunkhannock Creek.

=== Tributaries ===
Utley Brook has one named tributary, which is known as Willow Brook. Willow Brook is approximately 3.7 miles (6.0 km) long.

== Geography and geology ==
The elevation near the mouth of Utley Brook is 732 feet (223 m) above sea level. The elevation of the stream's source is between 1,260 and 1,280 feet (384 and 390 m) above sea level.

The surficial geology in the valley of Utley Brook mostly consists of alluvium and a till known as Wisconsinan Till. However, there are also wetlands and lakes in the valley. Additionally, bedrock consisting of sandstone and shale occurs in the surficial geology on some hills around the stream's valley.

Marcellus Gas Gathering, LLC. has requested and/or received a permit to build, operate, and maintain an 8-inch (20-centimeter) diameter steel natural gas pipeline crossing a stream in the watershed of Utley Brook. Williams Field Services Company, LLC requested and/or received a permit to build, operate, and maintain a 12-inch (30-centimeter) diameter natural gas pipeline crossing Utley Brook itself.

== Watershed and biology ==
The mouth of Utley Brook is in the United States Geological Survey quadrangle of Hop Bottom. However, its source is in the quadrangle of Lenoxville.

Utley Brook is classified as a Coldwater Fishery and a Migratory Fishery.

== See also ==
- Martins Creek (Tunkhannock Creek), next tributary of Tunkhannock Creek going downstream
- East Branch Tunkhannock Creek, next tributary of Tunkhannock Creek going upstream
- List of rivers of Pennsylvania
