= Dry Creek (Martins Creek tributary) =

Physical characteristics
- Source
  - location: unnamed pond in Brooklyn Township, Susquehanna County, Pennsylvania
  - elevation: between 1,540 and 1,560 feet (470 and 480 m)
- Mouth
  - location: Martins Creek in Lathrop Township, Susquehanna County, Pennsylvania
  - coordinates: 41°43′08″N 75°46′07″W
  - elevation: 876 ft (267 m)
- Length: 4.7 mi (7.6 km)
- Basin size: 3.32 mi^{2} (8.6 km^{2})

Basin features
- Progression: Martins Creek → Tunkhannock Creek → Susquehanna River → Chesapeake Bay
- Tributaries
  - left: two unnamed tributaries
  - right: four unnamed tributaries

Dry Creek is a tributary of Martins Creek in Susquehanna County, Pennsylvania, in the United States. It is approximately 4.7 miles (7.6 km) long and flows through Brooklyn Township and Lathrop Township. The watershed of the creek has an area of 3.32 square miles (8.6 km^{2}). The creek is not designated as an impaired waterbody and is a Coldwater Fishery and a Migratory Fishery. The surficial geology in its vicinity consists of Wisconsinan Till, a lake, and some alluvium in the lower reaches.

== Course ==
Dry Creek begins in an unnamed pond in Brooklyn Township. It flows south for several tenths of a mile and enters Jones Lake, where it receives two unnamed tributaries from the right. From the southern end of Jones Lake, the creek flows south-southeast for a few miles, receiving two unnamed tributaries from the left and two from the right and entering a valley. It then turns south and its valley narrows. After several tenths of a mile, the creek turns south-southwest for a few tenths of a mile, entering Lathrop Township. Shortly after entering Lathrop Township, the creek reaches its confluence with Martins Creek.

Dry Creek joins Martins Creek 7.73 miles (12.44 km) upstream of its mouth.

== Hydrology ==
Dry Creek is not designated as an impaired waterbody. The creek only seasonally flows into Martins Creek.

== Geography and geology ==
The elevation near the mouth of Dry Creek is 876 feet (267 m) above sea level. The elevation of the creek's source is between 1,540 and 1,560 feet (470 and 480 m) above sea level.

The surficial geology in the valley of Dry Creek consists mostly of a till known as Wisconsinan Till, although large patches of alluvium also occur. Additionally, there is a small patch of peat bog. In the upper reaches, the surficial geology alongside the creek consists entirely of Wisconsinan Till, except for Jones Lake.

== Watershed and biology ==
The watershed of Dry Creek has an area of 3.32 square miles (8.6 km^{2}). The mouth of the creek is in the United States Geological Survey quadrangle of Hop Bottom. However, its source is in the quadrangle of Montrose East. The mouth of the creek is located within 1 mile (1.6 km) of Hop Bottom.

The designated use for Dry Creek is aquatic life. Williams Field Services Company, LLC has received an Erosion and Sediment Control permit for which the receiving streams are the creek and its unnamed tributaries.

Dry Creek is classified as a Coldwater Fishery and a Migratory Fishery.

== History ==
Dry Creek was entered into the Geographic Names Information System on August 2, 1979. Its identifier in the Geographic Names Information System is 1173498.

== See also ==
- Hop Bottom Creek, next tributary of Martins Creek going downstream
- East Branch Martins Creek, next tributary of Martins Creek going upstream
- List of rivers of Pennsylvania
