= Willow Brook (Utley Brook tributary) =

Physical characteristics
- Source
  - location: Clark Pond in Lenox Township, Susquehanna County, Pennsylvania
  - elevation: 1,302 ft (397 m)
- Mouth
  - location: Utley Brook in Nicholson Township, Wyoming County, Pennsylvania
  - coordinates: 41°38′16″N 75°44′42″W
  - elevation: 678 ft (207 m)
- Length: 3.7 mi (6.0 km)

Basin features
- Progression: Utley Brook → Tunkhannock Creek → Susquehanna River → Chesapeake Bay
- Tributaries
  - left: one unnamed tributary
  - right: two unnamed tributaries

Willow Brook is a tributary of Utley Brook in Susquehanna County and Wyoming County, in Pennsylvania, in the United States. It is approximately 3.7 miles (6.0 km) long and flows through Lenox Township in Susquehanna County and Nicholson Township in Wyoming County. The surficial geology in the vicinity of the stream consists mainly of Wisconsinan Till, bedrock, alluvium, wetlands, and a lake. A number of bridges have been constructed across it. The stream is classified as a Coldwater Fishery and a Migratory Fishery.

== Course ==
Willow Brook begins in Clark Pond in Lenox Township, Susquehanna County. It flows west-southwest for a short distance before entering a wetland. Here, it turns south-southeast, receiving an unnamed tributary from the right, passing through a small, unnamed pond, and leaving the wetland. The stream continues flowing in a generally south-southeasterly direction for more than a mile, receiving an unnamed tributary from the left in the process. The stream then turns south for several tenths of a mile. An unnamed distributary branches off from the left and Willow Brook enters a wetland. It then turns south-southwest for several tenths of a mile, entering another wetland, where it receives an unnamed tributary from the right. It then turns south for a few tenths of a mile before turning south-southeast, passing through a small wetland and entering Nicholson Township, Wyoming County. Several tenths of a mile further downstream, the stream reaches its confluence with Utley Brook.

== Geography and geology ==
The elevation near the mouth of Willow Brook is 778 feet (237 m) above sea level. The elevation near the stream's source is 1,302 feet (397 m) above sea level.

The surficial geology near the mouth of Willow Brook includes alluvium (which contains stratified silt, sand, and gravel), a till known as Wisconsinan Till, and bedrock consisting of sandstone and shale. In the vicinity of the lower reaches of the stream, there are patches of alluvium and wetlands, as well much Wisconsinan Till, all typically having thicknesses of 6 feet (1.8 m) or more in the general area. Further upstream, the surficial geology in the area mostly consists of Wisconsinan Till, but there are large patches of bedrock consisting of sandstone and shale, smaller patches of alluvium and wetland, and a lake.

== Watershed and biology ==
The mouth of Willow Brook is in the United States Geological Survey quadrangle of Lenoxville. However, its source is in the quadrangle of Hop Bottom.

Willow Brook is classified as a Coldwater Fishery and a Migratory Fishery.

== History ==
Willow Brook was entered into the Geographic Names Information System on August 2, 1979. Its identifier in the Geographic Names Information System is 1191497.

A steel stringer/multi-beam or girder bridge carrying State Route 1027 over Willow Brook was constructed in Nicholson Township, Wyoming County in 1953 and is 21.0 feet (6.4 m) long. In 2014, a bridge replacement operation was carried out for a bridge carrying State Route 2019 (Schoolhouse Road) over the stream in Lenox Township, Susquehanna County. In August 2014, the completion of this project was scheduled for October 2014.

In 2013, Chief Oil & Gas LLC was issued an Erosion and Sediment Control permit for which the receiving waterbodies are Willow Brook and one of its unnamed tributaries.

== See also ==
- List of rivers of Pennsylvania
