= Brackney =

Brackney may refer to:

- Brackney, California, an unincorporated community in Santa Cruz County
- Brackney, Pennsylvania, an unincorporated community in Susquehanna County
- William H. Brackney (1948–2022), a professor and Baptist minister in Nova Scotia

== See also ==
- Brackley, a market town in South Northamptonshire, England
