= Brooklyn, Pennsylvania =

Unincorporated community in Pennsylvania, US

- Unincorporated community
- Location within Pennsylvania
- Coordinates: 41°45′04″N 75°48′25″W
- Country: United States
- State: Pennsylvania
- County: Susquehanna
- Elevation: 1,106 ft (337 m)
- Time zone: UTC-5 (Eastern (EST))
  - Summer (DST): UTC-4 (EDT)
- ZIP code: 18813
- Area code: 570
- GNIS feature ID: 1170330

Brooklyn is an unincorporated community in Susquehanna County, Pennsylvania, United States. The community is located along Pennsylvania Route 167, 3.8 miles (6.1 km) northwest of Hop Bottom. Brooklyn has a post office with ZIP code 18813, which opened on March 20, 1830.
