= Little Creek (East Branch Tunkhannock Creek tributary) =

Physical characteristics
- Source
  - location: valley in Herrick Township, Susquehanna County, Pennsylvania
  - elevation: 1,710 feet (520 m)
- Mouth
  - location: East Branch Tunkhannock Creek in Clifford Township, Susquehanna County, Pennsylvania near Elkdale
  - coordinates: 41°41′43″N 75°31′29″W
  - elevation: 1,345 feet (410 m)
- Length: 3.0 mi (4.8 km)
- Basin size: 4.56 sq mi (11.8 km^{2})

Basin features
- Progression: East Branch Tunkhannock Creek → Tunkhannock Creek → Susquehanna River → Chesapeake Bay
- Tributaries
  - left: Tinker Hollow

Little Creek is a tributary of East Branch Tunkhannock Creek in Susquehanna County, Pennsylvania, in the United States. It is approximately 3.0 miles (4.8 km) long and flows through Herrick Township and Clifford Township. The watershed of the creek has an area of 4.56 square miles (11.8 km^{2}). The creek has one unofficially named tributary, which is known as Tinker Hollow. Little Creek is designated as Class A Wild Trout Waters. The surficial geology in its vicinity mainly consists of Wisconsinan Till and alluvium.

== Course ==
Little Creek begins in a valley in Herrick Township. It flows southwest for a few tenths of a mile, passing through an unnamed pond before turning south-southeast. After more than a mile, the creek receives an unnamed tributary from the left and turns south, entering Clifford Township. Several tenths of a mile further downstream, it turns southwest, receiving the tributary Tinker Hollow from the left before turning northwest, beginning to flow alongside Tinker Hill. After a short distance, the creek turns southwest again for a few tenths of a mile before reaching its confluence with East Branch Tunkhannock Creek.

Little Creek is approximately 3.0 miles (4.8 km) long. The creek joins East Branch Tunkhannock Creek 13.78 miles (22.18 km) upstream of its mouth.

=== Tributaries ===
Little Creek has one unofficially named tributary: Tinker Hollow, which is named for the valley through which it flows. Tinker Hollow joins Little Creek 0.60 miles (0.97 km) upstream of its mouth, near Burdick Corners, and drains an area of 1.33 square miles (3.4 km^{2}).

== Hydrology, geography, and geology ==
The elevation near the mouth of Little Creek is 1,345 feet (410 m) above sea level. The elevation near the creek's source is 1,710 feet (520 m) above sea level.

The surficial geology along the lower reaches of Little Creek mainly consists of alluvium, though there is a till known as Wisconsinan Till in the surrounding valley. Along the upper reaches of the creek, the surficial geology is mostly Wisconsinan Till.

The concentration of alkalinity in Little Creek is 45 milligrams per liter (0.045 oz/cu ft).

== Watershed ==
The watershed of Little Creek has an area of 4.56 square miles (11.8 km^{2}). The creek is entirely within the United States Geological Survey quadrangle of Clifford. Its mouth is located near Elkdale.

A pipeline crosses Little Creek in its lower reaches.

== History ==
Little Creek was entered into the Geographic Names Information System on August 2, 1979. Its identifier in the Geographic Names Information System is 1179516.

A steel stringer/multi-beam or girder bridge carrying State Route 2029 over Little Creek was built in Clifford Township in 1953 and is 23.0 feet (7.0 m) long.

== Biology ==
Wild trout naturally reproduce in Little Creek from its headwaters downstream to its mouth. Little Creek is classified by the Pennsylvania Fish and Boat Commission as Class A Wild Trout Waters for brook trout.

The drainage basin of Little Creek is designated as a Coldwater Fishery. However, its existing use is Exceptional Value waters.

== See also ==
- Tinker Creek (East Branch Tunkhannock Creek), next tributary of East Branch Tunkhannock Creek going downstream
- List of rivers of Pennsylvania
