= Martins Creek (Tunkhannock Creek tributary) =

Creek in Pennsylvania, US

Coordinates: 41°37′13″N 75°47′04″W

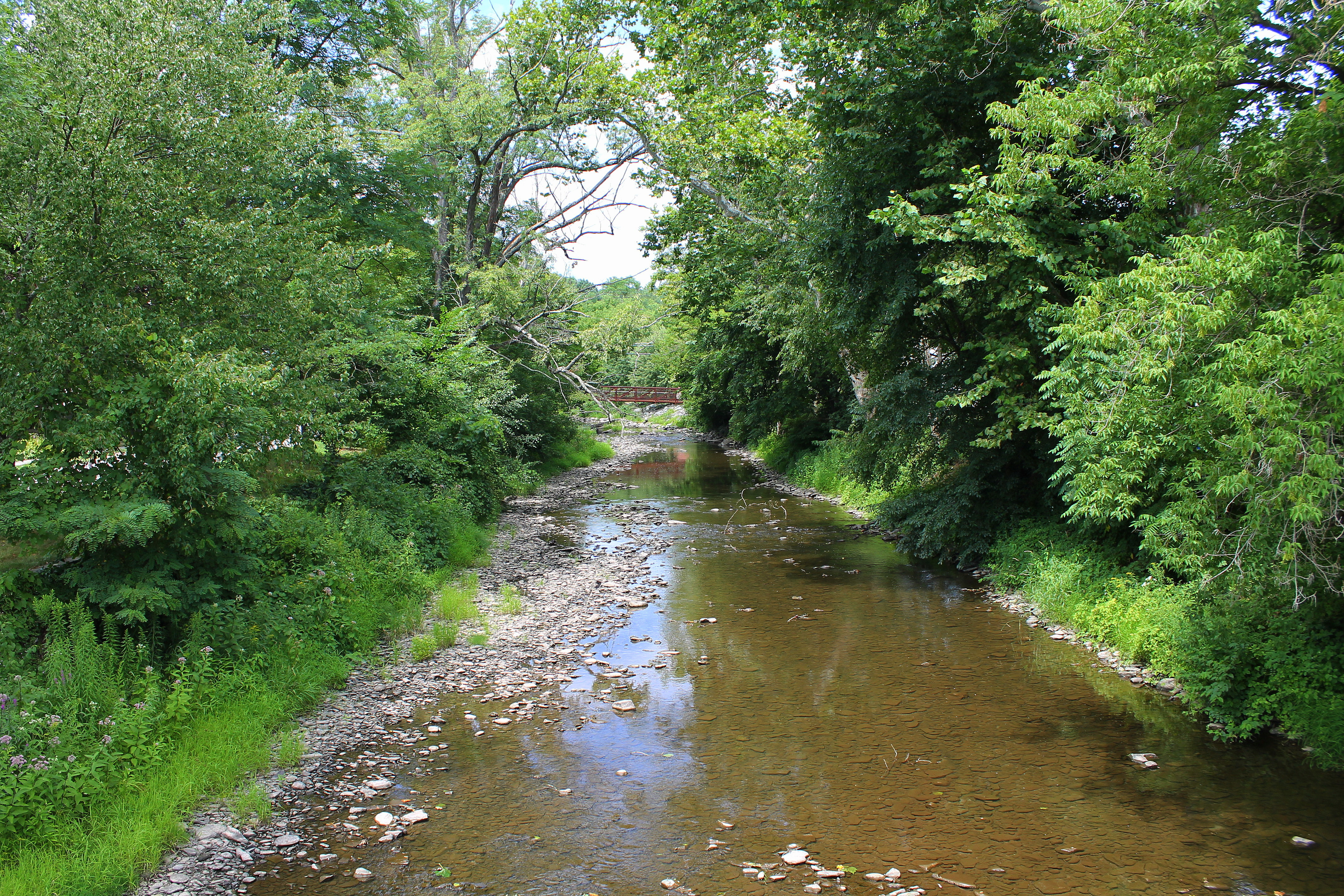
Martins Creek looking upstream in Nicholson

Martins Creek is a 20.4-mile-long (32.8 km) tributary of Tunkhannock Creek in northeastern Pennsylvania in the United States.

Martins Creek begins just west of New Milford and flows south to the Tunkhannock at Nicholson. It flows through a deep, narrow valley and is paralleled by U.S. Route 11 for its entire length.

Martins Creek has three named tributaries: Hop Bottom Creek, Dry Creek, and East Branch Martins Creek.

== See also ==
- Horton Creek (Tunkhannock Creek), next tributary of Tunkhannock Creek going downstream
- Utley Brook, next tributary of Tunkhannock Creek going upstream
- List of rivers of Pennsylvania
