= East Branch Martins Creek =

Physical characteristics
- Source
  - location: small unnamed pond in New Milford Township, Susquehanna County, Pennsylvania
  - elevation: between 1,580 and 1,600 feet (482 and 488 m)
- Mouth
  - location: Martins Creek in Harford Township, Susquehanna County, Pennsylvania
  - coordinates: 41°45′44″N 75°45′20″W
  - elevation: 945 ft (288 m)
- Length: 5.1 mi (8.2 km)
- Basin size: 7.36 mi^{2} (19.1 km^{2})

Basin features
- Progression: Martins Creek → Tunkhannock Creek → Susquehanna River → Chesapeake Bay
- Tributaries
  - left: four unnamed tributaries
  - right: two unnamed tributaries

East Branch Martins Creek is a tributary of Martins Creek in Susquehanna County, Pennsylvania, in the United States. It is approximately 5.1 miles (8.2 km) long and flows through New Milford Township and Harford Township. The watershed of the creek has an area of 7.36 square miles (19.1 km^{2}). The creek is not designated as an impaired waterbody. The surficial geology in its vicinity consists of Wisconsinan Till, alluvium, alluvial fan, Wisconsinan Ice-Contact Stratified Drift, and bedrock.

== Course ==
East Branch Martins Creek begins in a small, unnamed pond in New Milford Township. It flows west-southwest for a short distance before turning southwest for several tenths of a mile, receiving an unnamed tributary from the right and entering Harford Township. Here, the creek flows south-southwest for more than a mile, receiving another unnamed tributary from the right before turning south and passing through a wetland and Beaver Meadow Pond. It then turns south-southeast for several tenths of a mile and receives three unnamed tributaries from the left and turns south before turning south-southwest and receiving another unnamed tributary from the left. After several tenths of a mile, it crosses US Route 11 and reaches its confluence with Martins Creek.

East Branch Martins Creek joins Martins Creek 11.29 miles (18.17 km).

== Hydrology ==
East Branch Martins Creek is not designated as an impaired waterbody.

== Geography and geology ==
The elevation near the mouth of East Branch Martins Creek is 945 feet (288 m) above sea level. The elevation of the creek's source is between 1,580 and 1,600 feet (482 and 488 m) above sea level.

The surficial geology near the mouth of East Branch Martins Creek mainly consists of alluvium and a till known as Wisconsinan Till. However, there is a patch of alluvial fan at the creek's mouth. Further upstream the surficial geology is fairly similar, and there is another patch of alluvial fan. However, there is also a patch of Wisconsinan Ice-Contact Stratified Drift. Bedrock consisting of sandstone and shale also occurs near the creek's valley.

There is a beaded valley in the watershed of East Branch Martins Creek.

== Watershed and biology ==
The watershed of East Branch Martins Creek has an area of 7.36 square miles (19.1 km^{2}). The mouth of the creek is in the United States Geological Survey quadrangle of Montrose East. However, its source is in the quadrangle of Harford. The mouth of the creek is located within 1 mile (1.6 km) of Kingsley.

== History ==
East Branch Martins Creek was entered into the Geographic Names Information System on August 2, 1979. Its identifier in the Geographic Names Information System is 1173754.

On April 2, 2014, a permit was issued authorizing the operation, commencement, and restoration of a quarry for which the receiving stream was East Branch Martins Creek, as was a permit authorizing mining-related stormwater discharges for which the receiving stream was East Branch Martins Creek.

== Biology ==
The designated use for East Branch Martins Creek is aquatic life. The creek is classified as a Coldwater Fishery and a Migratory Fishery. It is stocked with trout, as of 2012.

== See also ==
- Dry Creek (Martins Creek), next tributary of Martins Creek going downstream
- List of rivers of Pennsylvania
