= Silver Lake Township, Pennsylvania =

Township in Pennsylvania, United States

- Township
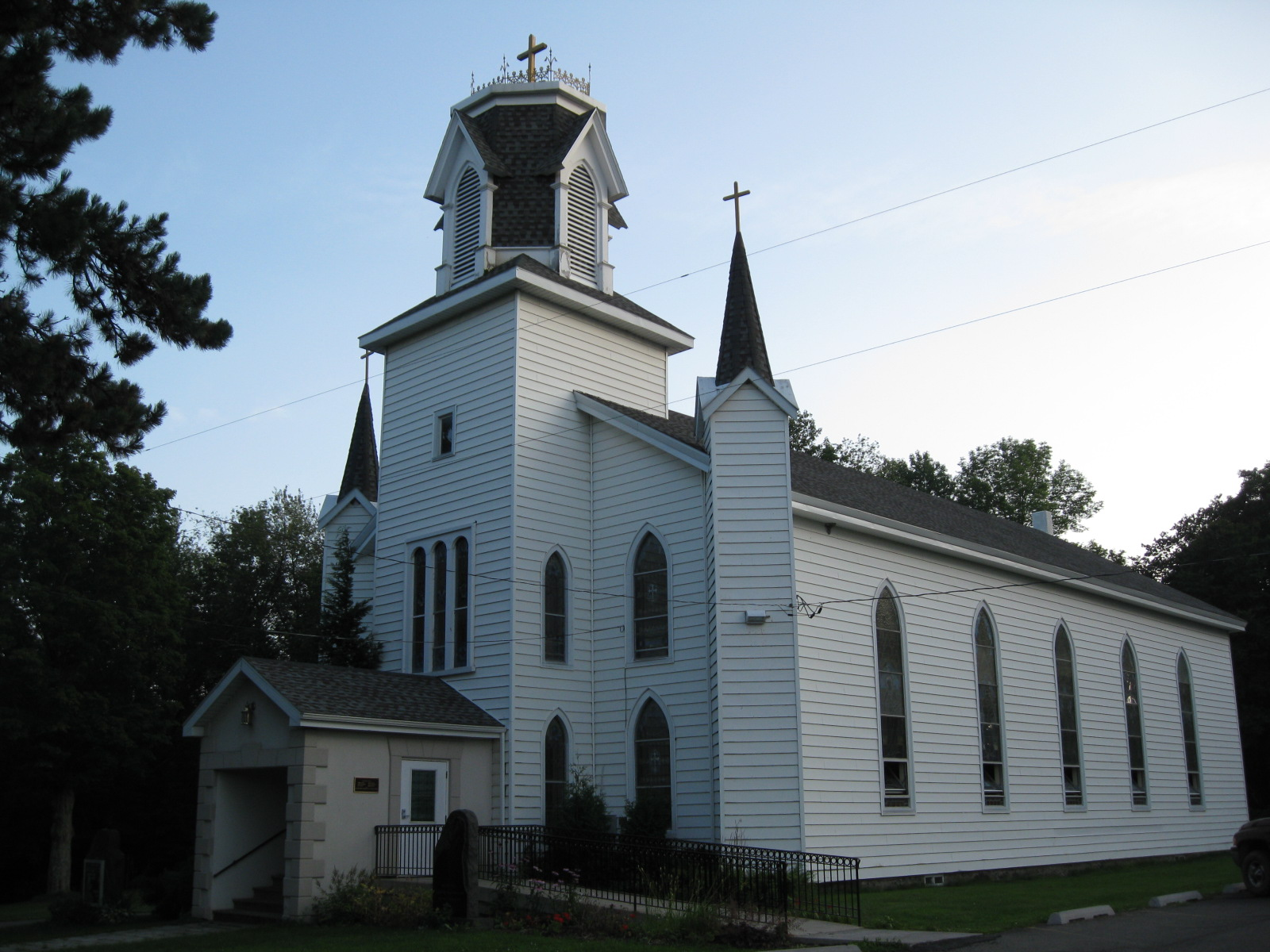
- St. Augustine's Catholic Church

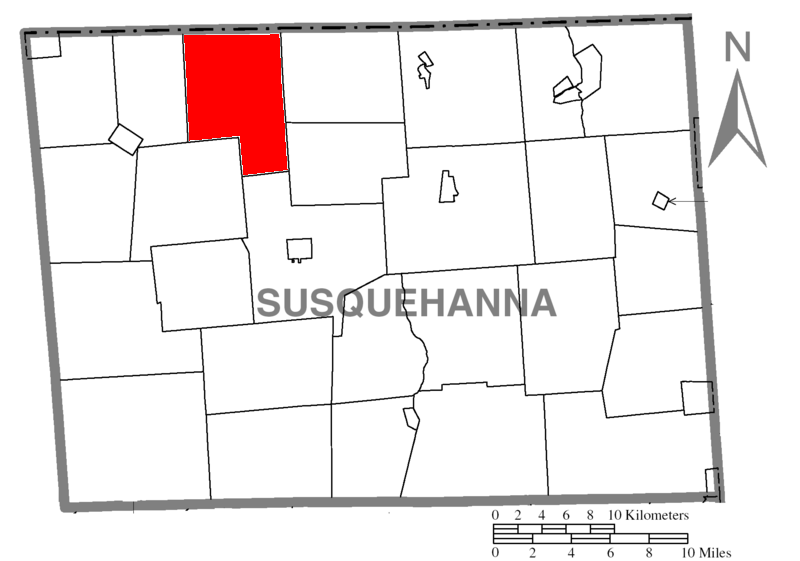

- Location of Pennsylvania in the United States
- Coordinates: 41°57′00″N 75°54′59″W
- Country: United States
- State: Pennsylvania
- County: Susquehanna
- Settled: 1809
- Incorporated: 1813

Area
  - Total: 33.31 sq mi (86.27 km^{2})
  - Land: 32.71 sq mi (84.71 km^{2})
  - Water: 0.60 sq mi (1.55 km^{2})

Population (2020)
  - Total: 1,525
  - Estimate (2021): 1,521
  - Density: 49.5/sq mi (19.12/km^{2})
- Time zone: UTC-5 (EST)
  - Summer (DST): UTC-4 (EDT)
- ZIP Code: 18812
- Area code: 570
- FIPS code: 42-115-70776
- Website: www.silverlaketwp.org

Silver Lake Township is a township in Susquehanna County, Pennsylvania, United States. The population was 1,525 at the 2020 census. The village of Brackney is in the township.

== History ==
On February 18, 1809, Dr Robert H Rose purchased 248 tracts of land totaling about 100,000 acres which at that time was part of Luzerne County, Pennsylvania. A part of the land purchased would later form the whole of Silver Lake Township, Susquehanna County. The land was deeded from Anne Francis to Rose with Richard Penn Jr., the grandson of William Penn, signing the deed after noting his equitable interest and confirming the sale.

On April 27, 1813, Silver Lake Township was formed from the north part of Bridgewater Township in this area.

In 1848, J.W. Brackney of Prattsville, NY, founded the village of Brackney where he operated a large tannery.

== Geography ==
According to the United States Census Bureau, the township has a total area of 33.3 square miles (86 km^{2}), of which 32.7 square miles (85 km^{2}) is land and 0.6 square miles (1.6 km^{2}) (1.8%) is water.

== Demographics ==
Historical population
Census	Pop.	Note	%±
2010	1,716		—
2020	1,525		−11.1%
2021 (est.)	1,521		−0.3%
U.S. Decennial Census

As of the census of 2010, there were 1,716 people, 708 households, and 512 families residing in the township. The population density was 52.5 people per square mile (20.3 people/km^{2}). There were 1,102 housing units at an average density of 33.7 per square mile (13.0/km^{2}). The racial makeup of the township was 98.6% White, 0.2% African American, 0.1% Native American, 0.2% Asian, and 0.9% from two or more races. Hispanic or Latino of any race were 0.7% of the population.

There were 708 households, out of which 24.9% had children under the age of 18 living with them, 64.7% were married couples living together, 4.4% had a female householder with no husband present, and 27.7% were non-families. 22.9% of all households were made up of individuals, and 10.3% had someone living alone who was 65 years of age or older. The average household size was 2.42 and the average family size was 2.85.

In the township the population was spread out, with 20.2% under the age of 18, 62.6% from 18 to 64, and 17.2% who were 65 years of age or older. The median age was 48 years.

The median income for a household in the township was $56,026, and the median income for a family was $58,864. Males had a median income of $47,976 versus $30,729 for females. The per capita income for the township was $23,493. About 4.8% of families and 6.8% of the population were below the poverty line, including 12.2% of those under age 18 and 8.4% of those age 65 or over.
