= Hop Bottom, Pennsylvania =

Borough in Pennsylvania, US

- Borough
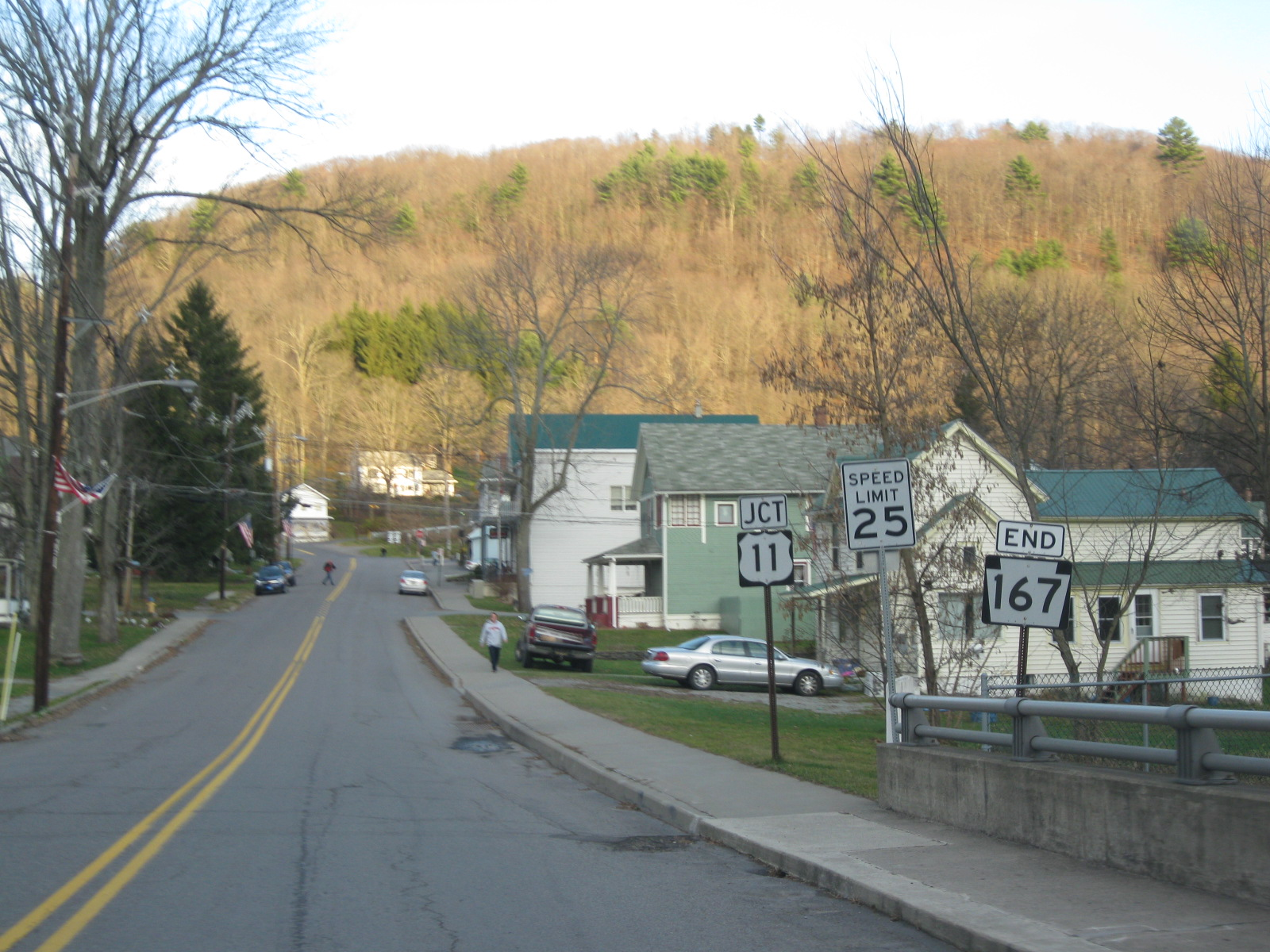

- Location of Hop Bottom in Susquehanna County, Pennsylvania.

- Location within Pennsylvania Location within the United States
- Coordinates: 41°42′18″N 75°45′56″W
- Country: United States
- State: Pennsylvania
- County: Susquehanna
- Settled: 1799
- Incorporated: 1881

Area
  - Total: 0.61 sq mi (1.58 km^{2})
  - Land: 0.61 sq mi (1.57 km^{2})
  - Water: 0.0039 sq mi (0.01 km^{2})

Population (2020)
  - Total: 311
  - Density: 514/sq mi (198.3/km^{2})
- Time zone: UTC-5 (Eastern (EST))
  - Summer (DST): UTC-4 (EDT)
- ZIP code: 18824
- Area codes: 570 and 272
- FIPS code: 42-35624
- Website: https://hopbottompa.gov/

Hop Bottom is a borough of Susquehanna County, Pennsylvania, United States. The population was 310 as of the 2020 census. The name comes from the hop, a plant providing flowers for brewing.

== History ==
Hop Bottom was formerly known as "Foster." The present name is derived from nearby Hop Bottom Creek. Native Americans once lived in the area, and the only clear meadows to be found were near the bottom of the creek. These meadows were covered with hop vines, leading to the name "Hop Bottom."

== Geography ==
Hop Bottom is located at 41°42′18″N 75°45′56″W.

According to the United States Census Bureau, the borough has a total area of 0.6 square miles (1.6 km^{2}), all land.

Hop Bottom is located at the junction of U.S. Route 11 and Pennsylvania Route 167. It is also seven miles west of Interstate 81.

== Demographics ==
Historical population
Census	Pop.	Note	%±
1890	299		—
1900	326		9.0%
1910	364		11.7%
1920	349		−4.1%
1930	354		1.4%
1940	375		5.9%
1950	375		0.0%
1960	381		1.6%
1970	430		12.9%
1980	405		−5.8%
1990	345		−14.8%
2000	333		−3.5%
2010	337		1.2%
2020	311		−7.7%
2021 (est.)	309	▼	−0.6%

According to the census of 2010, there were 337 people, 138 households, and 88 families residing in the borough. The population density was 561.7 inhabitants per square mile (216.9/km^{2}). There were 147 housing units at an average density of 245 per square mile (95/km^{2}). The racial makeup of the borough was 98.5% White and 1.5% from two or more races. Hispanic or Latino of any race were 1.2% of the population.

Of the 138 households, 26.8% had children under the age of 18 living with them, 44.9% were married couples living together, 13.8% had a female householder with no husband present, and 36.2% were non-families. 28.3% of all households were made up of individuals, and 6.5% had someone living alone who was 65 years of age or older. The average household size was 2.44 and the average family size was 3.03.

In the borough the population was spread out, with 22.6% under the age of 18, 63.8% from 18 to 64, and 13.6% who were 65 years of age or older. The average (median) age was 39 years.

The median income for a household in the borough was $42,917, and the median income for a family was $53,125. Males had a median income of $44,167 versus $28,542 for females. The per capita income for the borough was $19,665. About 17.9% of families and 20.8% of the population were below the poverty line, including 27.7% of those under age 18 and 16.1% of those age 65 or over.
