= Brackney, Pennsylvania =

Unincorporated community in Pennsylvania, US

Coordinates: 41.990°N 75.928°W

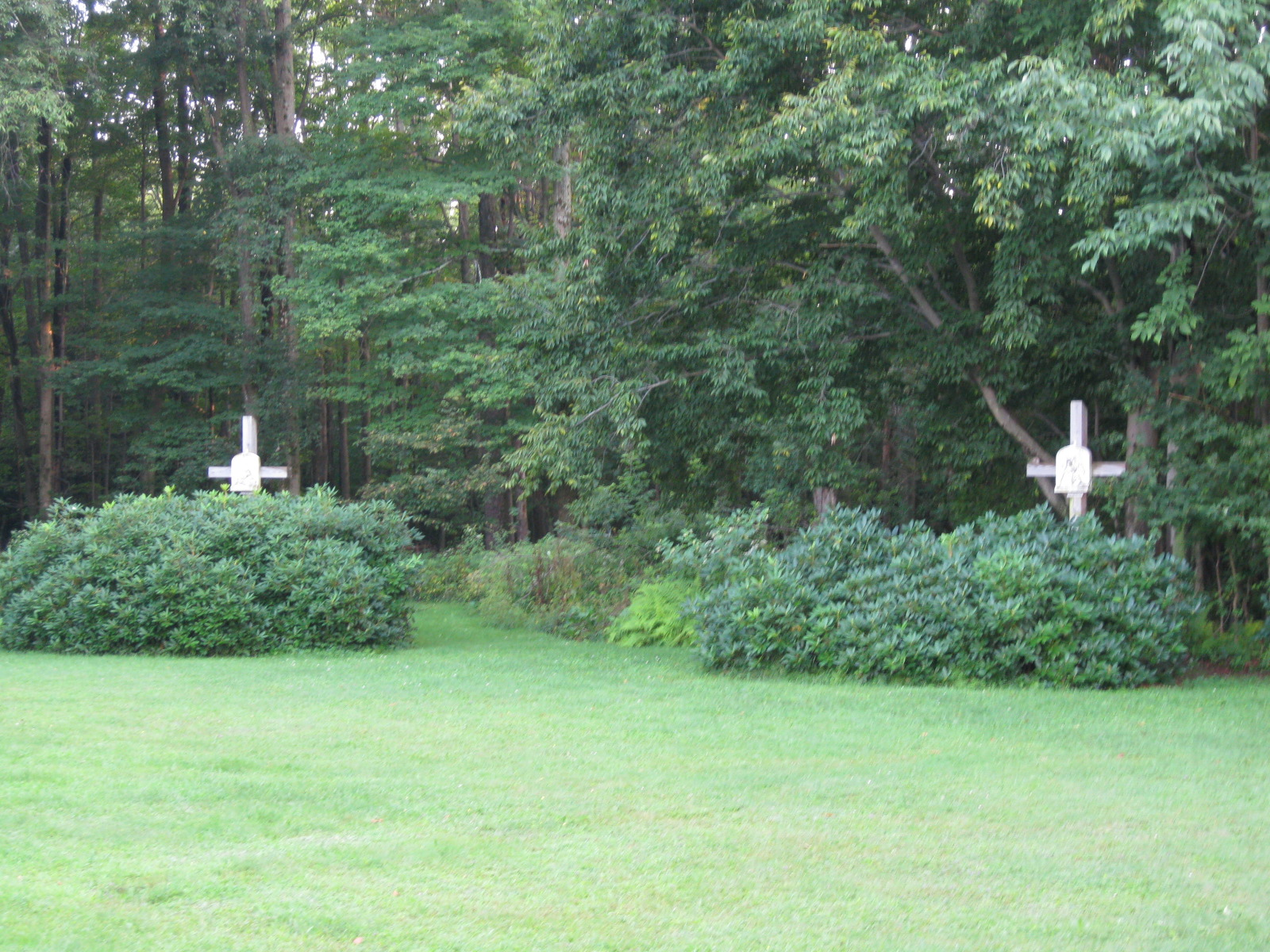
St. Augustine's Church in Brackney

Brackney is an unincorporated community within Silver Lake Township, Susquehanna County, Pennsylvania, United States. The community is 7.6 miles (12.2 km) south of Binghamton, New York. Brackney has a post office with ZIP code 18812.
