= Lenox Township, Susquehanna County, Pennsylvania =

Township in Pennsylvania, United States

Lenox Township, Pennsylvania
- Township
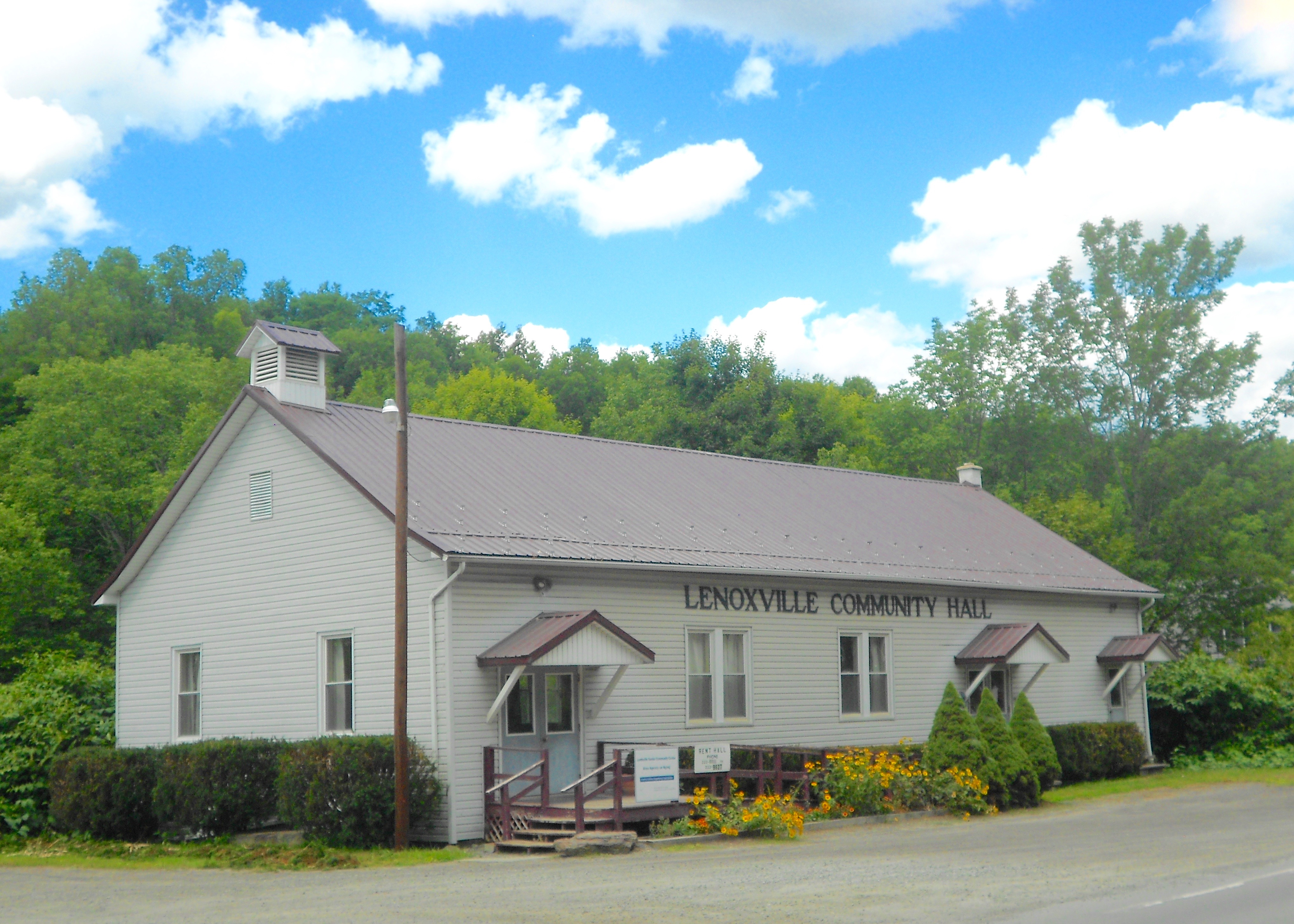
- Community Hall in Lenoxville

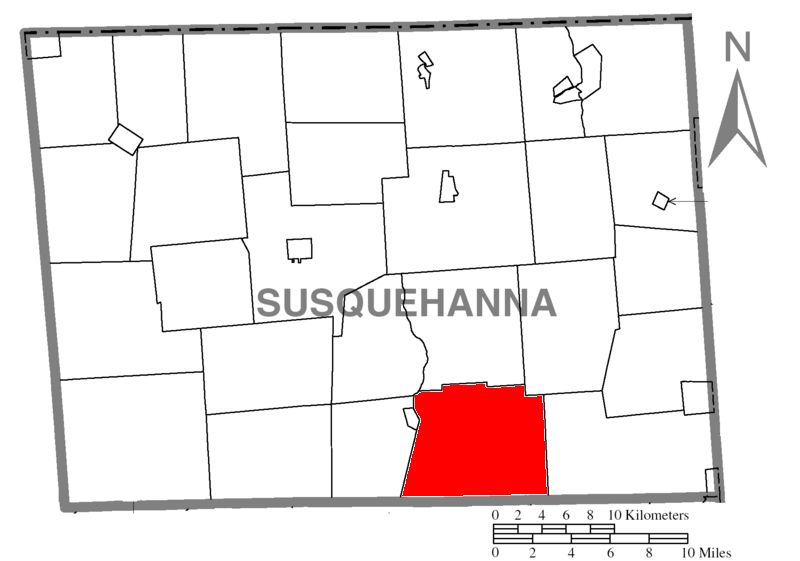

- Location of Pennsylvania in the United States
- Coordinates: 41°42′00″N 75°41′59″W
- Country: United States
- State: Pennsylvania
- County: Susquehanna
- Settled: 1797
- Incorporated: 1795

Area
  - Total: 41.14 sq mi (106.55 km^{2})
  - Land: 40.63 sq mi (105.22 km^{2})
  - Water: 0.51 sq mi (1.33 km^{2})

Population (2020)
  - Total: 1,598 ▼
  - Estimate (2021): 1,595
  - Density: 45/sq mi (17.3/km^{2})
- Time zone: UTC-5 (EST)
  - Summer (DST): UTC-4 (EDT)
- Area code: 570
- FIPS code: 42-115-42760

Lenox Township is a township in Susquehanna County, Pennsylvania, United States. The population was 1,598 at the 2020 census.

== Geography ==
According to the United States Census Bureau, the township has a total area of 41.1 square miles (106 km^{2}), of which 40.6 square miles (105 km^{2}) is land and 0.5 square miles (1.3 km^{2}) (1.22%) is water.

== History ==
What is now known as Lenox Township was incorporated as Nicholson Township in 1795. It was renamed Lenox Township in 1813. The current village of Lenoxville was originally called "Doud's Hollow", and was first settled by Isaac Doud in 1797. The borough of Hop Bottom was formed from a part of Lenox Township in 1881.

== Notable person ==
Galusha A. Grow, Speaker of the United States House of Representatives from 1861 to 1863 and one of the creators of the Homestead Act of 1862, spent much of his adult life at Glenwood in Lenox Township.

== Demographics ==
Historical population
Census	Pop.	Note	%±
2010	1,934		—
2020	1,598		−17.4%
2021 (est.)	1,595		−0.2%
U.S. Decennial Census

As of the census of 2010, there were 1,934 people, 768 households, and 536 families residing in the township. The population density was 47.6 people per square mile (18.4 people/km^{2}). There were 963 housing units at an average density of 23.7 per square mile (9.2/km^{2}). The racial makeup of the township was 98% White, 0.3% African American, 0.2% Native American, 0.3% Asian, 0.3% from other races, and 0.9% from two or more races. Hispanic or Latino of any race were 1.2% of the population.

There were 768 households, out of which 29% had children under the age of 18 living with them, 56% were married couples living together, 6.9% had a female householder with no husband present, and 30.2% were non-families. 23.4% of all households were made up of individuals, and 10.3% had someone living alone who was 65 years of age or older. The average household size was 2.49 and the average family size was 2.92.

In the township the population was spread out, with 20.7% under the age of 18, 61.7% from 18 to 64, and 17.6% who were 65 years of age or older. The median age was 45 years.

The median income for a household in the township was $42,206, and the median income for a family was $49,489. Males had a median income of $39,667 versus $31,500 for females. The per capita income for the township was $23,674. About 4.9% of families and 8.9% of the population were below the poverty line, including 11.7% of those under age 18 and 3.3% of those age 65 or over.
