= Brooklyn Township, Pennsylvania =

Township in Pennsylvania, United States

- Township
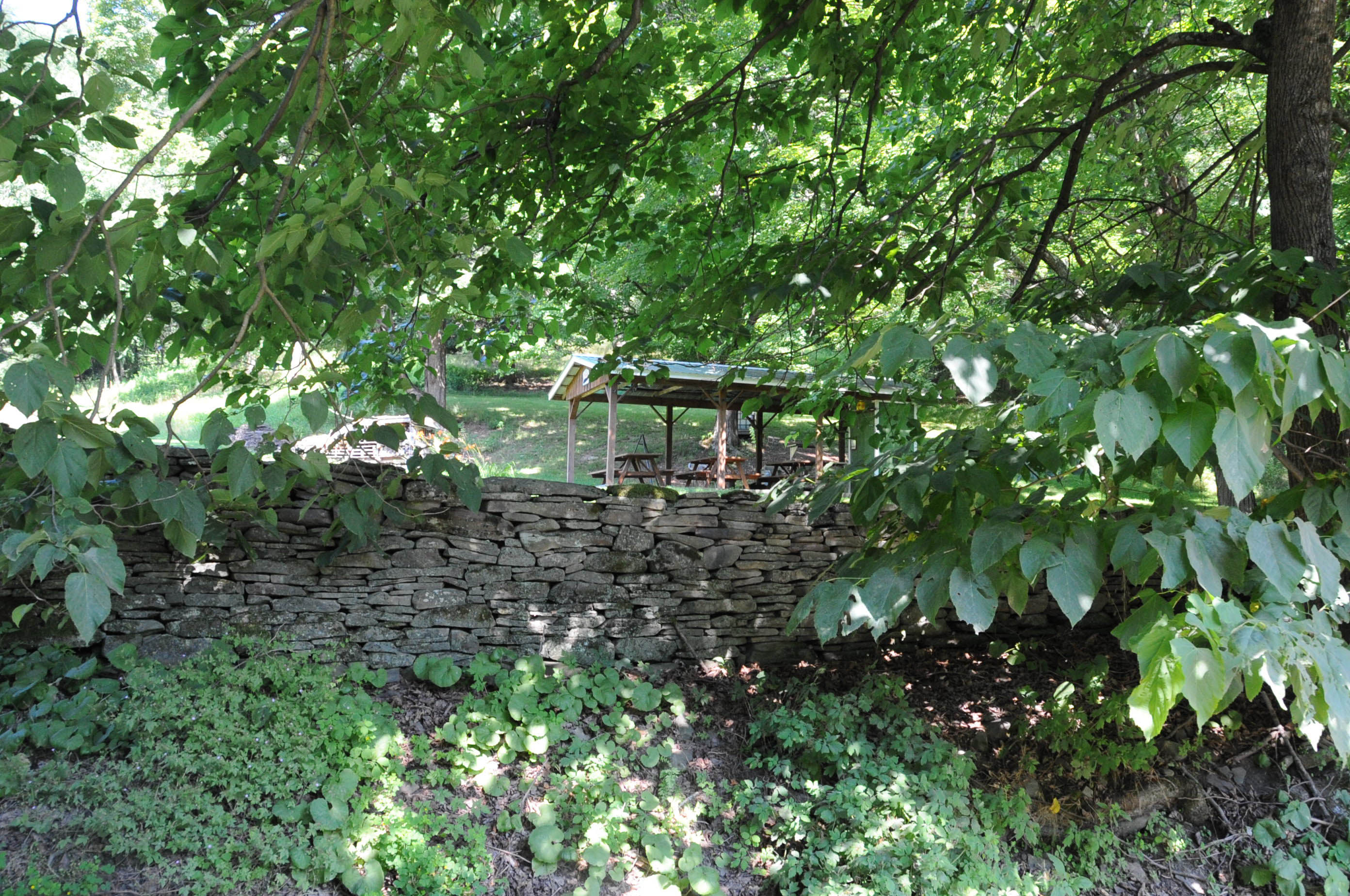
- Dennis Farm

- Logo

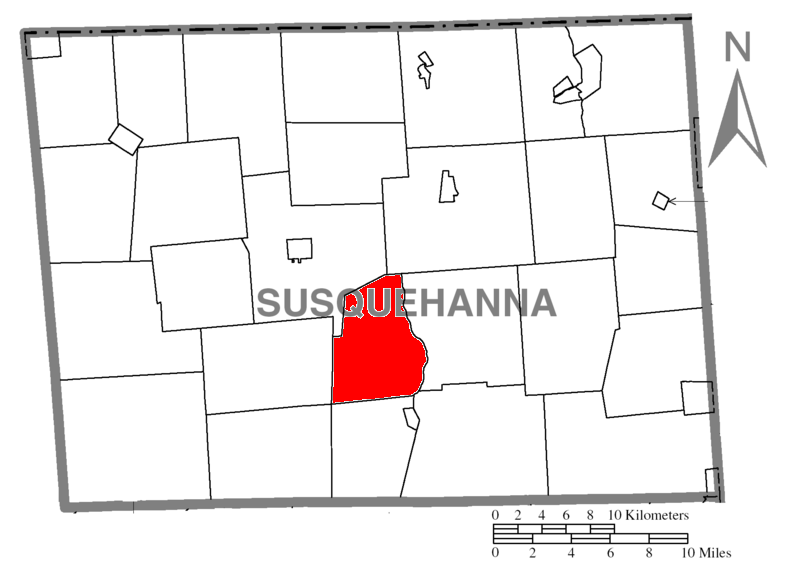

- Location of Pennsylvania in the United States
- Coordinates: 41°45′39″N 75°47′53″W
- Country: United States
- State: Pennsylvania
- County: Susquehanna
- Settled: 1787
- Incorporated: 1814

Area
  - Total: 24.48 sq mi (63.41 km^{2})
  - Land: 24.29 sq mi (62.90 km^{2})
  - Water: 0.20 sq mi (0.51 km^{2})

Population (2020)
  - Total: 793 ▼
  - Estimate (2021): 794
  - Density: 37.8/sq mi (14.58/km^{2})
- Time zone: UTC-5 (EST)
  - Summer (DST): UTC-4 (EDT)
- Area code: 570
- FIPS code: 42-115-09128
- Website: brooklynpa.gov

Brooklyn Township is a township in Susquehanna County, Pennsylvania, United States. The population was 793 at the 2020 census.

== Geography ==
According to the United States Census Bureau, the township has a total area of 24.5 square miles (63 km^{2}), of which 24.3 square miles (63 km^{2}) is land and 0.2 square miles (0.52 km^{2}) (0.82%) is water.

== History ==
Brooklyn Township was formed from the southern part of Bridgewater Township in April 1814. Originally called Waterford Township, it was renamed Hop Bottom Township in 1823 and finally Brooklyn Township in 1825.

== Demographics ==
Historical population
Census	Pop.	Note	%±
2010	963		—
2020	793		−17.7%
2021 (est.)	794		0.1%
U.S. Decennial Census

As of the census of 2010, there were 963 people, 383 households, and 262 families residing in the township. The population density was 39.6 inhabitants per square mile (15.3/km^{2}). There were 443 housing units at an average density of 18.2/sq mi (7.1/km^{2}). The racial makeup of the township was 97.8% White, 0.4% African American, 0.5% Asian, 0.2% from other races, and 1% from two or more races. Hispanic or Latino of any race were 1.8% of the population.

There were 383 households, out of which 28.2% had children under the age of 18 living with them, 56.1% were married couples living together, 5.7% had a female householder with no husband present, and 31.6% were non-families. 26.1% of all households were made up of individuals, and 12.5% had someone living alone who was 65 years of age or older. The average household size was 2.51 and the average family size was 3.08.

In the township the population was spread out, with 22.1% under the age of 18, 59.8% from 18 to 64, and 18.1% who were 65 years of age or older. The median age was 45 years.

The median income for a household in the township was $39,792, and the median income for a family was $44,632. Males had a median income of $40,417 versus $28,125 for females. The per capita income for the township was $23,275. About 13.9% of families and 18.3% of the population were below the poverty line, including 28.2% of those under age 18 and 14.6% of those age 65 or over.
