= Drift (geology) =

Material of glacial origin

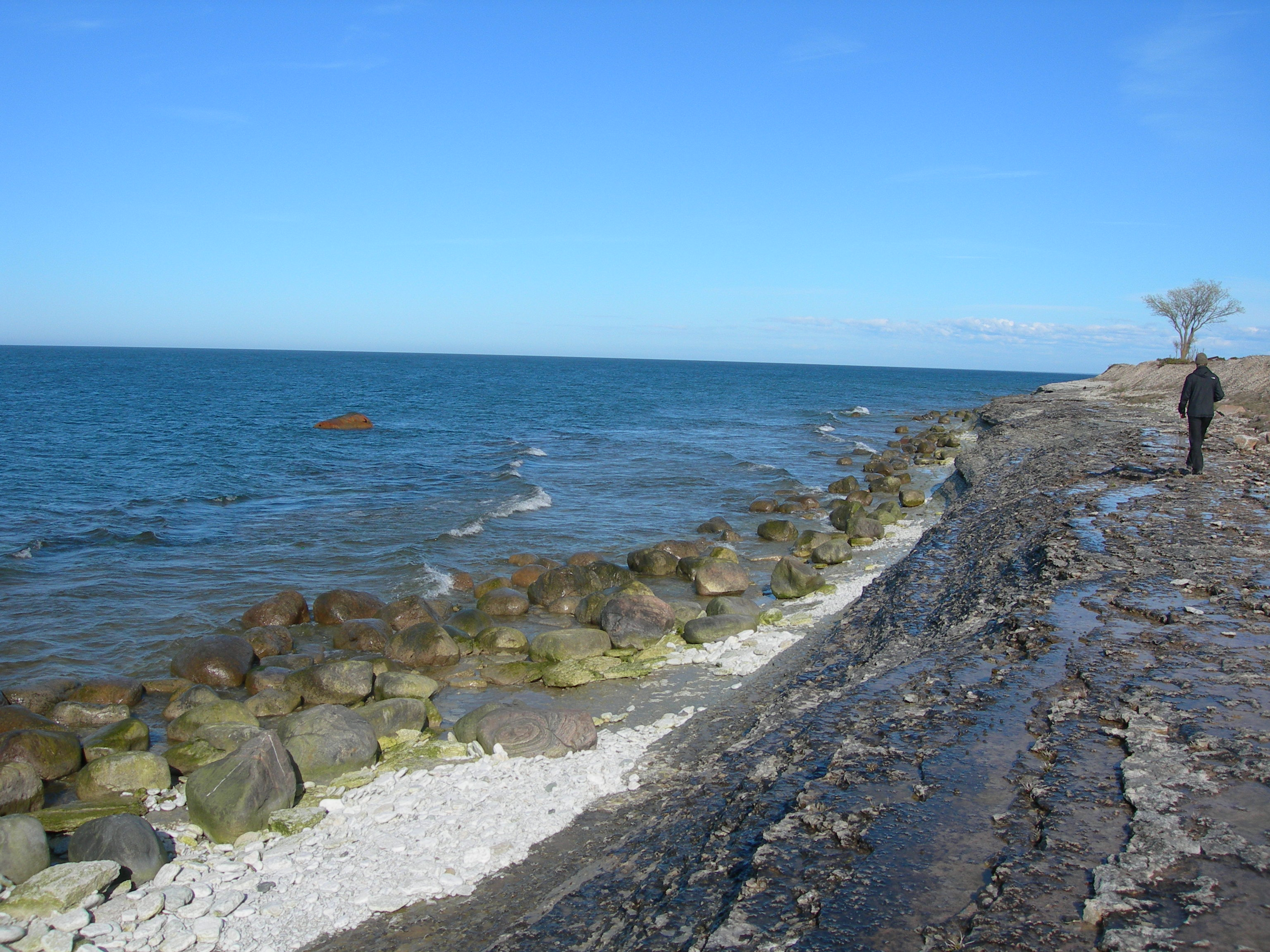
Rounded erratic boulders of crystalline rock composition next to Ordovician limestone bank along the shoreline in NW Osmussaar, Estonia.

In geology, drift is a name for all sediment (clay, silt, sand, gravel, boulders) transported by a glacier and deposited directly by or from the ice, or by glacial meltwater. Drift is often subdivided into unstratified (unsorted) drift (glacial till) that forms moraines and stratified drift (glaciolacustrine and fluvioglacial sediments) that accumulates as stratified and sorted sediments in the form of outwash plains, eskers, kames, varves, and so forth. The term drift clay is a synonym for boulder clay. Both are archaic terms for glacial tills with a fine-grained matrix.

In the United Kingdom, drift is also applied as a general term for all surficial, unconsolidated, rock debris and sediment that is moved from one place to accumulate in another and mapped separately or otherwise differentiated from underlying bedrock. In this usage, drift includes a wide variety of deposits, e.g. loess, glacial till, river deposits, colluvium, and so forth, of Quaternary age. However, this term is most commonly used to specifically describe glacial deposits.

== Etymology ==
In 1839, geologist Roderick Murchison introduced the term drift to describe unconsolidated surficial sediments previously called diluvium. The term drift refers to the drift hypothesis proposed by Charles Lyell, as influenced by contemporary polar research, that these sediments had been transported by sea ice and icebergs drifting in marine currents. The drift hypothesis further proposed that these sediments had been released as the ice melted, to fall and accumulate on the sea floor in comparatively recent times, e.g. during the Quaternary Period. This term continued to be used long after the drift hypothesis had been abandoned in favor of the glacial theory.

== See also ==
- Superficial deposits
- Drift mining
- Driftless Area
