= Clifford Township, Susquehanna County, Pennsylvania =

Township in Pennsylvania, United States

Clifford Township, Pennsylvania
- Township
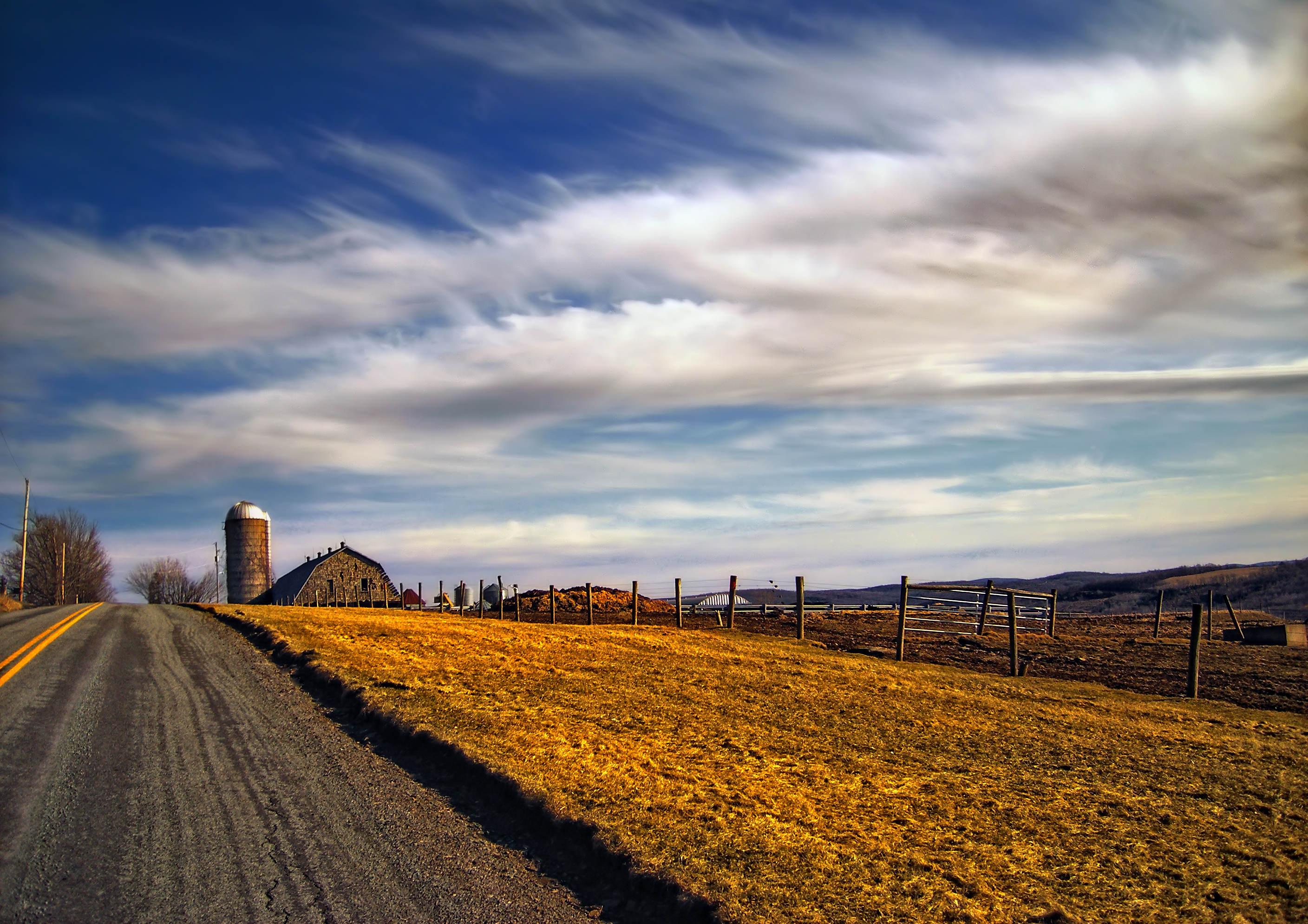
- A country road in Clifford Township

- Seal

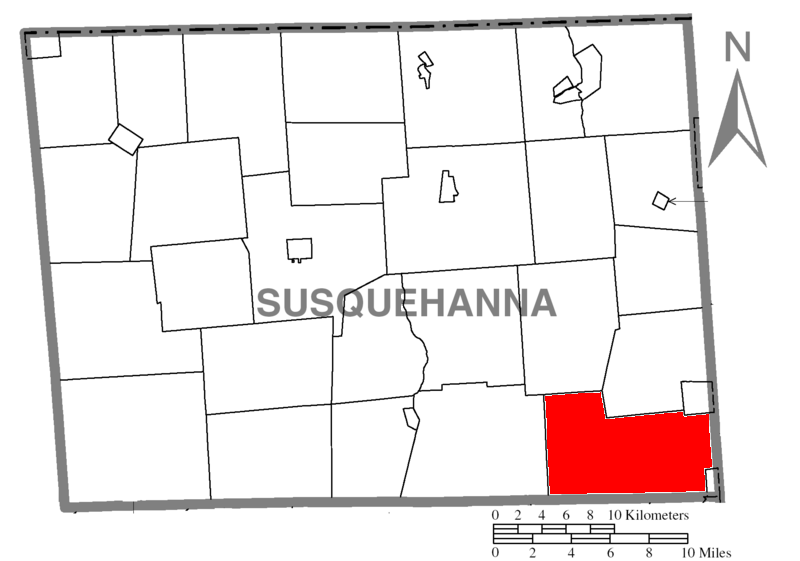

- Location of Pennsylvania in the United States
- Coordinates: 41°40′27″N 75°33′15″W
- Country: United States
- State: Pennsylvania
- County: Susquehanna
- Settled: 1799
- Incorporated: 1806

Area
  - Total: 40.93 sq mi (106.00 km^{2})
  - Land: 40.48 sq mi (104.84 km^{2})
  - Water: 0.45 sq mi (1.16 km^{2})

Population (2020)
  - Total: 2,107 ▼
  - Estimate (2021): 2,099
  - Density: 56.9/sq mi (21.95/km^{2})
- Time zone: UTC-5 (EST)
  - Summer (DST): UTC-4 (EDT)
- Zip Code: 18407, 18413, 18421, 18441, 18446, 18470
- Area code: 570
- FIPS code: 42-115-14224
- Website: www.cliffordtownship.org

Clifford Township is a township in Susquehanna County, Pennsylvania, United States. The population was 2,107 at the time of the 2020 census.

== History ==
Clifford Township was formed within the original Luzerne County in 1806 from parts of Nicholson Township; Nicholson Township was renamed Lenox Township in 1813.

The new township was named for "a man by the name of Clifford in Philadelphia", with the expectation that this man would pay for the honor of having a town named for him. He did not pay. Clifford Township became a part of Susquehanna County when it was partitioned from Luzerne County on February 21, 1810.

== Geography ==
According to the United States Census Bureau, the township has a total area of 40.9 square miles (106 km^{2}), of which 40.5 square miles (105 km^{2}) is land and 0.45 square miles (1.2 km^{2}) (1.1%) is water.

== Demographics ==
Historical population
| Census | Pop. | Note | %± |
|---|---|---|---|
| 2010 | 2,408 | | — |
| 2020 | 2,107 | | −12.5% |
| 2021 (est.) | 2,099 | | −0.4% |
U.S. Decennial Census

As of the census of 2010, there were 2,408 people, 990 households, and 679 families residing in the township.

The population density was 59.5 people per square mile (23/km^{2}). There were 1,278 housing units at an average density of 31.5 per square mile (12.2/km^{2}).

The racial makeup of the township was 97.6% White, 0.3% African American, 0.1% Native American, 0.2% Asian, 0.1% Pacific Islander, 0.5% from other races, and 1.2% from two or more races. Hispanic or Latino of any race were 1.6% of the population.

There were 990 households, out of which 26.7% had children under the age of eighteen living with them; 55.5% were married couples living together, 8.3% had a female householder with no husband present, and 31.4% were non-families. 27.5% of all households were made up of individuals, and 10% had someone living alone who was sixty-five years of age or older.

The average household size was 2.43 and the average family size was 2.92.

In the township the population was spread out, with 19.4% under the age of eighteen, 63.9% from eighteen to sixty-four, and 16.7% who were sixty-five years of age or older. The median age was forty-five years.

The median income for a household in the township was $45,030, and the median income for a family was $48,333. Males had a median income of $42,153 compared with that of $35,506 for females.

The per capita income for the township was $26,412.

Roughly 7.5% of families and 7.1% of the population were living below the poverty line, including 8.7% of those who were under the age of eighteen and 15.3% of those who were aged sixty-five or older.

== Clifford Picnic ==
The Clifford Picnic is a fair usually celebrated during the last full week in July. The picnic is a local institution and a fund raising event for the Clifford Township Volunteer Fire Department.

The first picnic was held in August 1949. For the first several years, the Firemen Picnics were held in the field behind the home of Mr. and Mrs. Walter LaCoe. The fire engine was kept across the street at LaCoe's Clifford Farm Supply Store. As this meant that stands and tents needed to be erected each year, the Fire Company purchased 21 acres (85,000 m^{2}) of land including a small pond.

This location is known locally simply as "the Picnic grounds", but may also be called "the Clifford Carnival grounds", "the Clifford Picnic grounds", or, since they built a new station on the grounds in the last decade, "the fire house".

The Clifford Twp. Volunteer Fire Company is home to a miniature railroad that once existed at Rocky Glen Park in Moosic. The train was added to Rocky Glen in 1924 and was a part of the Nallin-Jennings Park's side of Rocky Glen (John Nallin and Joseph Jennings), as the park at the time was split into two. It operated in the same area the 1905 Miniature Railroad did with a slightly different path, which in the 1980s would be where the Jet Coaster was located.

The railroad operated until the early 1950s, when Nallin-Jennings' side of Rocky Glen suffered the Fire of 1950, which destroyed Nallin-Jennings' three major rides, including the Pippin Coaster, The Fun House (the remodeled Crystal Dance Pavilion) and the Tokyo Canal water ride, an Old Mill type ride. With barely anything left but a few rides, what was left of Nallin-Jennings's business was sold to Benjamin & Lena Balka, who immediately sold it to Ben and Mae Sterling, the owners of the other half of the park. Because Sterling had now control of the whole park, during the years from 1951 to 1954, they began removing the duplication of rides that existed on both sides of the park and, by 1954, finally tore down the back half of the Pippin Coaster which stood for four years.

Sterling had his own Miniature Railroad that went out along the "Million Dollar" Roller Coaster and was a much better attraction because of the proximity to the lake and large coaster. The now former Nallin-Jennings Miniature Railroad was dismantled and then sold by new owner Ben Sterling to persons from the Clifford Township Volunteer Fire Company, where it has remained with some modifications over the years to keep it going.

As of 2018, it will be in its 94th year in operation.
