= Pennsylvania Turnpike Extension =

Pennsylvania Turnpike Extension may refer to:

- Northeastern Extension of the Pennsylvania Turnpike
- various other historic extensions of the Pennsylvania Turnpike main line
- Pennsylvania Extension of the New Jersey Turnpike
