= Sustainable Development Goals and Ireland =

Implementation of the Sustainable Development Goals in Ireland

Sustainable Development Goals and Ireland describes Ireland's participation in the Sustainable Development Goals (SDGs) process and the national implementation of the 2030 Agenda for Sustainable Development. Ireland was one of the 193 United Nations member states that adopted the 2030 Agenda in September 2015. Ireland also had a role in the development of the agenda. Its then Permanent Representative to the United Nations, David Donoghue, and Kenya's Permanent Representative, Macharia Kamau, were appointed co-facilitators of the final phase of intergovernmental negotiations on the 2030 Agenda and the 17 goals.

Implementation in Ireland is coordinated through a whole-of-government approach led by the Department of Climate, Energy and the Environment, with each minister responsible for SDG targets relevant to their functions. The Department of Foreign Affairs leads Ireland's international work on the SDGs, while the Central Statistics Office supports national statistical reporting. Ireland has published two SDG National Implementation Plans, covering 2018–2020 and 2022–2024, and presented Voluntary National Reviews to the United Nations High-Level Political Forum on Sustainable Development in 2018 and 2023.

== Background ==
The SDGs succeeded the Millennium Development Goals and form part of the United Nations 2030 Agenda for Sustainable Development. The 17 goals and 169 targets cover social, economic and environmental dimensions of sustainable development, including poverty, health, education, climate action, gender equality, sustainable cities, biodiversity, peace, justice and international partnership.

Ireland's involvement in the SDG process includes both domestic implementation and international engagement. The Government of Ireland states that the SDGs apply to Ireland's national policy framework as well as to Ireland's international development programme. Ireland's international development policy, A Better World, is framed around the ambition of reaching the furthest behind first, in line with the 2030 Agenda principle of Leaving No One Behind.

== Role in the SDGs process ==
Ireland was involved in the final negotiations that led to the adoption of the SDGs. David Donoghue, Ireland's Permanent Representative to the United Nations, and Macharia Kamau, Kenya's Permanent Representative, were appointed by the President of the United Nations General Assembly as co-facilitators of the final phase of intergovernmental negotiations on the 2030 Agenda.

Ireland has also participated in SDG monitoring through the High-level Political Forum on Sustainable Development, including through its 2018 and 2023 Voluntary National Reviews.

== National governance and coordination ==
Ireland's national SDG implementation framework is based on a whole-of-government model. The Department of Climate, Energy and the Environment has overall responsibility for promoting the SDGs and overseeing their coherent implementation across government. Individual ministers retain responsibility for targets that fall within their departmental functions, and each government department has an SDG point of contact.

The SDG Senior Officials Group and the SDG Interdepartmental Working Group support cross-government implementation. According to the Government of Ireland, these groups identify priorities, oversee and monitor progress, and support the integration of the SDGs into departmental work and stakeholder engagement. The SDG Interdepartmental Working Group includes representatives from government departments involved in implementation and has published meeting agendas and minutes since 2019.

The SDG Data Governance Board was established to source, develop and report statistical data for SDG indicators and targets. The Central Statistics Office is responsible for identifying and managing the national data required for Ireland's SDG reporting obligations.

== National Implementation Plans ==
=== First National Implementation Plan, 2018–2020 ===
Ireland's first SDG National Implementation Plan was published in 2018. It set out how Ireland would work to achieve the SDGs domestically and internationally, and included an SDG Matrix identifying responsible government departments for each of the 169 targets. It also included an SDG Policy Map linking the targets to relevant national policies and set out 19 actions for the duration of the plan.

The 2018–2020 plan focused on a whole-of-government approach. The OECD later described it as having four strategic priorities: raising public awareness, facilitating stakeholder participation, supporting community and organisational efforts, and aligning national policies with the SDGs.

=== Second National Implementation Plan, 2022–2024 ===
The second National Implementation Plan for the Sustainable Development Goals was published on 5 October 2022. It was developed with input from government departments, stakeholders and two public consultation processes. The plan set out five strategic objectives, 51 actions and 119 individual measures intended to strengthen Ireland's SDG implementation structures. It also incorporated 23 external actions from other national plans or strategies for coherence and reporting purposes.

The five strategic objectives were to embed the SDG framework in government departments, integrate the SDGs into local authority work, strengthen partnerships, further incorporate the Leave No One Behind principle, and improve reporting, monitoring and accountability. The 2022 SDG Policy Map identified lead departments for the goals and targets, mapped all SDG targets against national policies and provided contact details for relevant policy areas.

=== Third National Implementation Plan ===
Work on Ireland's third SDG National Implementation Plan began after the second plan. A public consultation on the development of the third plan opened on 2 December 2025 and closed on 16 January 2026. The consultation was intended to gather stakeholder feedback on the preparation of the new plan. The OECD Policy Coherence Scan of Ireland was also intended to inform the development of the third plan.

== Reporting platforms and data ==
Ireland reports on SDG progress using national, United Nations and European Union indicator frameworks. The Central Statistics Office publishes data for each of the 17 SDGs and maintains statistical releases on goals such as poverty, health, education, climate action, biodiversity and partnerships. Ireland's SDG Data Hub, hosted on GeoHive, is a collaboration platform for reporting progress towards the goals and sharing information on related initiatives.

The SDG Data Hub provides data and information for each goal using UN global and EU-agreed targets and indicators. The Government states that the GeoHive platform highlights Ireland's progress towards achieving the SDGs and provides information on SDG initiatives and data across all 17 goals.

== Voluntary National Reviews ==
=== 2018 Voluntary National Review ===
Ireland presented its first Voluntary National Review to the High-level Political Forum on Sustainable Development in July 2018. The review assessed Ireland's performance against all 17 SDGs and included a statistical annex using Eurostat indicators. It was prepared by the Department with inputs from government departments through the SDG Interdepartmental Working Group and SDG Senior Officials Group process. A stakeholder consultation workshop was held in May 2018 with representatives from civil society, the private sector, agriculture, academia and other groups.

=== 2023 Voluntary National Review ===
Ireland presented its second Voluntary National Review to the High-Level Political Forum in July 2023. The report reviewed Ireland's progress towards the 2030 Agenda and the SDGs, including the commitment to Leave No One Behind. The 2023 review was developed around the theme "Building Back Better while Leaving No One Behind" and reflected the 2023 High-Level Political Forum theme on accelerating recovery from the COVID-19 pandemic and fully implementing the 2030 Agenda.

The 2023 review included an online public consultation, a youth consultation process and two SDG National Stakeholder Forum meetings. The Government stated that the youth consultation process resulted in a youth chapter, the first time such a chapter had been included in any country's Voluntary National Review. The report also included stakeholder assessments and independent observations from the Irish Human Rights and Equality Commission.

== Stakeholder engagement and public awareness ==
The SDG National Stakeholder Forum was established to inform further development of the national SDG framework and to provide a mechanism for stakeholders from different sectors to discuss ideas and solutions for achieving the SDGs in Ireland. The forum is convened and chaired by the Department of Climate, Energy and the Environment, and is also used in the preparation of SDG progress reporting.

The SDG Champions programme was established to raise public awareness of the goals through partnership and promotion. Champions are selected from the public, private, community, voluntary, youth and NGO sectors. The first SDG Champions programme took place in 2019. Subsequent programmes included 26 champions in 2023–2024, 20 champions in 2024–2025 and 20 champions selected for the 2025–2027 programme.

Ireland also participates in SDG Week, which forms part of European Sustainable Development Week. Ireland's fourth SDG Week was held from 19 to 28 September 2025, with almost 100 events organised across Ireland.

== Education for sustainable development ==
Education for sustainable development is addressed in Ireland through ESD to 2030, the country's second National Strategy on Education for Sustainable Development. The strategy was published in 2022 with an implementation plan for 2022–2026. The strategy applies across early learning and care, school education, further education and training, higher education, youth work, adult and community education, and research.

The strategy is relevant to SDG Target 4.7, which concerns education for sustainable development, global citizenship, human rights, gender equality, peace and non-violence, cultural diversity and sustainable lifestyles.

== Performance and assessment ==
=== SDG Index ===
The Sustainable Development Report 2025 country profile for Ireland gave Ireland an SDG Index score of 78.59 and a rank of 31 out of 167 countries. The same profile reported a spillover score of 48.73, reflecting the extent to which a country's actions affect other countries' ability to achieve the SDGs.

=== Policy coherence ===
Policy coherence for sustainable development is a recurring theme in Ireland's SDG implementation. The second National Implementation Plan included actions on embedding the SDG framework in government departments, considering how to integrate the SDGs into regulatory impact assessment and government memoranda, and assessing the potential for SDG budgeting and expenditure tracking.

In 2025, the Organisation for Economic Co-operation and Development published a Policy Coherence Scan of Ireland. The report found that Ireland had established a clear policy foundation for sustainable development and demonstrated commitment through the second National Implementation Plan, the National Development Plan 2021–2030 and other frameworks. It also identified areas for further development, including clearer mandates for policy coherence, better integration of the SDGs into existing policy tools, stronger local-level capacity, improved monitoring and evaluation, and more systematic assessment of policy synergies and trade-offs.

A 2025 article in Administration reviewing policy coherence in Irish water, circular economy and bioeconomy policy concluded that Ireland was performing reasonably well in some areas of policy coherence, including the general orientation of government policy towards sustainable development and stakeholder engagement, but that a concerted effort was needed to achieve transformative improvements.

== Challenges and criticism ==
Civil society groups have criticised aspects of Ireland's SDG performance. In 2023, Coalition 2030, an alliance of Irish civil society organisations and networks, criticised the Government's claim that Ireland was reaching around 80% of SDG targets and argued that the state was not doing enough to reach the groups furthest behind in Irish society.

The OECD's 2025 scan also noted implementation challenges. It found that Ireland had made progress in aligning national policies with the SDGs, but that translating strategic commitments into coherent implementation remained a challenge. The report identified issues including unclear mandates, limited resources, local-level capacity constraints, ad hoc stakeholder engagement and the need for stronger monitoring and evaluation systems.

== See also ==
- Sustainable Development Goals
- Sustainable development
- Climate change in the Republic of Ireland
- Education in the Republic of Ireland
- Irish Aid
- Central Statistics Office (Ireland)
- High-level Political Forum on Sustainable Development
