= Blue Mountain Tunnel =

Tunnel in Pennsylvania, United States

Coordinates: 40.146°N 77.6517°W

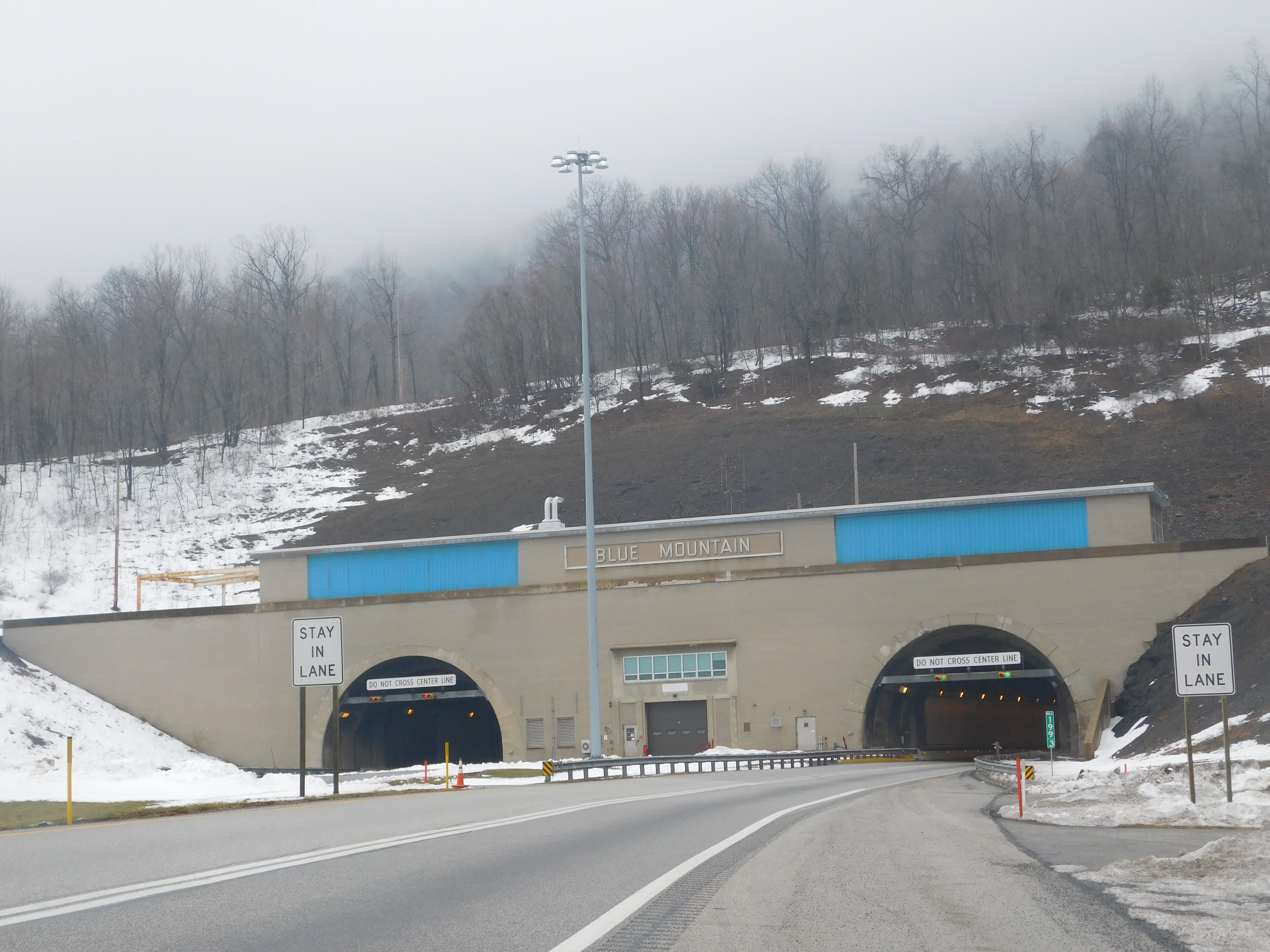
- The eastern portals of the Blue Mountain Tunnel, March 2017.
- Interactive map of Blue Mountain Tunnel

Overview
- Location: Blue Mountain
- Route: I-76 / Penna Turnpike
- Crosses: Blue Mountain

Operation
- Opened: 1940
- Reopened: 1960
- Operator: Pennsylvania Turnpike Commission

Technical
- Length: 4,339 ft (1,323 m)
- No. of lanes: 4 (two in each direction)

The Blue Mountain Tunnel is one of two tunnels through Blue Mountain in Pennsylvania, located west of Newburg. It is one of seven tunnels completed for the Pennsylvania Turnpike mainline, and at 4,339 ft (1,323 m) in length, is the shortest of the four still in use today.

The Blue Mountain Tunnel is 600 ft (180 m) to the east of the Kittatinny Mountain Tunnel, separated by the Gunter Valley. It was originally completed in 1940 with only one two lane section. An additional section was added in the 1960s carrying two additional lanes.

== See also ==
- Lehigh Tunnel, on the Pennsylvania Turnpike Northeast Extension, also cuts through Blue Mountain, but was given a different name to prevent confusion with the Blue Mountain Tunnel farther west.
