= Lehigh Tunnel =

Two road tunnels on Interstate 476

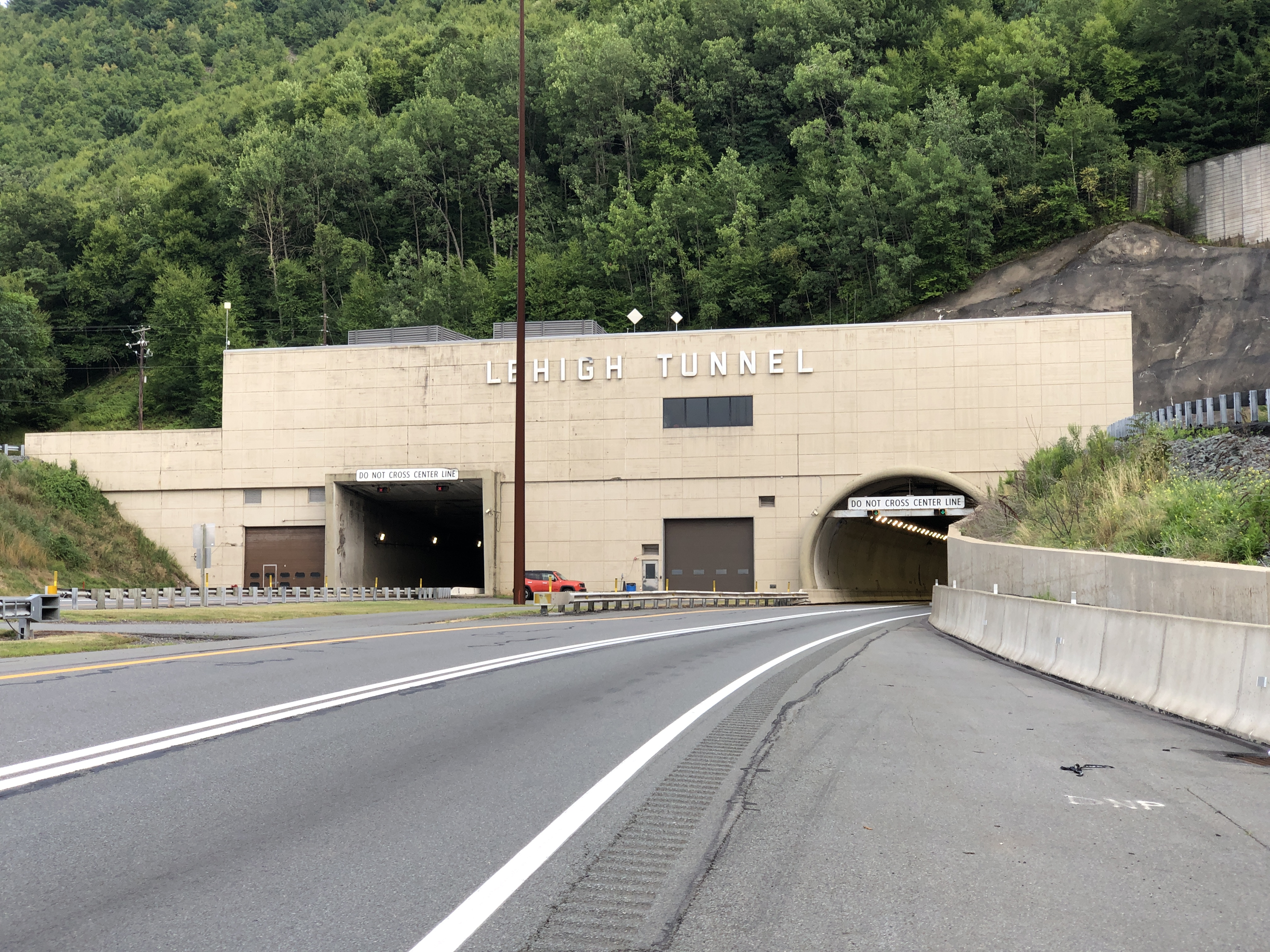
- Entrance to the Lehigh Tunnel heading southbound
- Interactive map of Lehigh Tunnel

Overview
- Location: Washington Township, Lehigh County, and East Penn Township, Carbon County, Pennsylvania
- Coordinates: 40.7789°N 75.6523°W
- Route: I-476 / Penna Turnpike NE Extension
- Crosses: Blue Mountain

Operation
- Work began: NB: September 21, 1955; SB: February 14, 1989
- Opened: NB: April 1, 1957; SB: November 9, 1991
- Operator: Pennsylvania Turnpike Commission
- Traffic: Automotive
- Character: Road
- Toll: $2.45 (E-ZPass) $4.90 (toll-by-plate)

Technical
- Length: 4,380 feet (1,340 m)
- No. of lanes: 4
- Operating speed: 55 mph (89 km/h)

The Lehigh Tunnel is a pair of road tunnels that carries the Pennsylvania Turnpike Northeast Extension (Interstate 476) under Blue Mountain north from U.S. Route 22 in the Lehigh Valley to the Scranton/Wilkes-Barre area between mileposts 70.7 to 71.5.

== Description ==
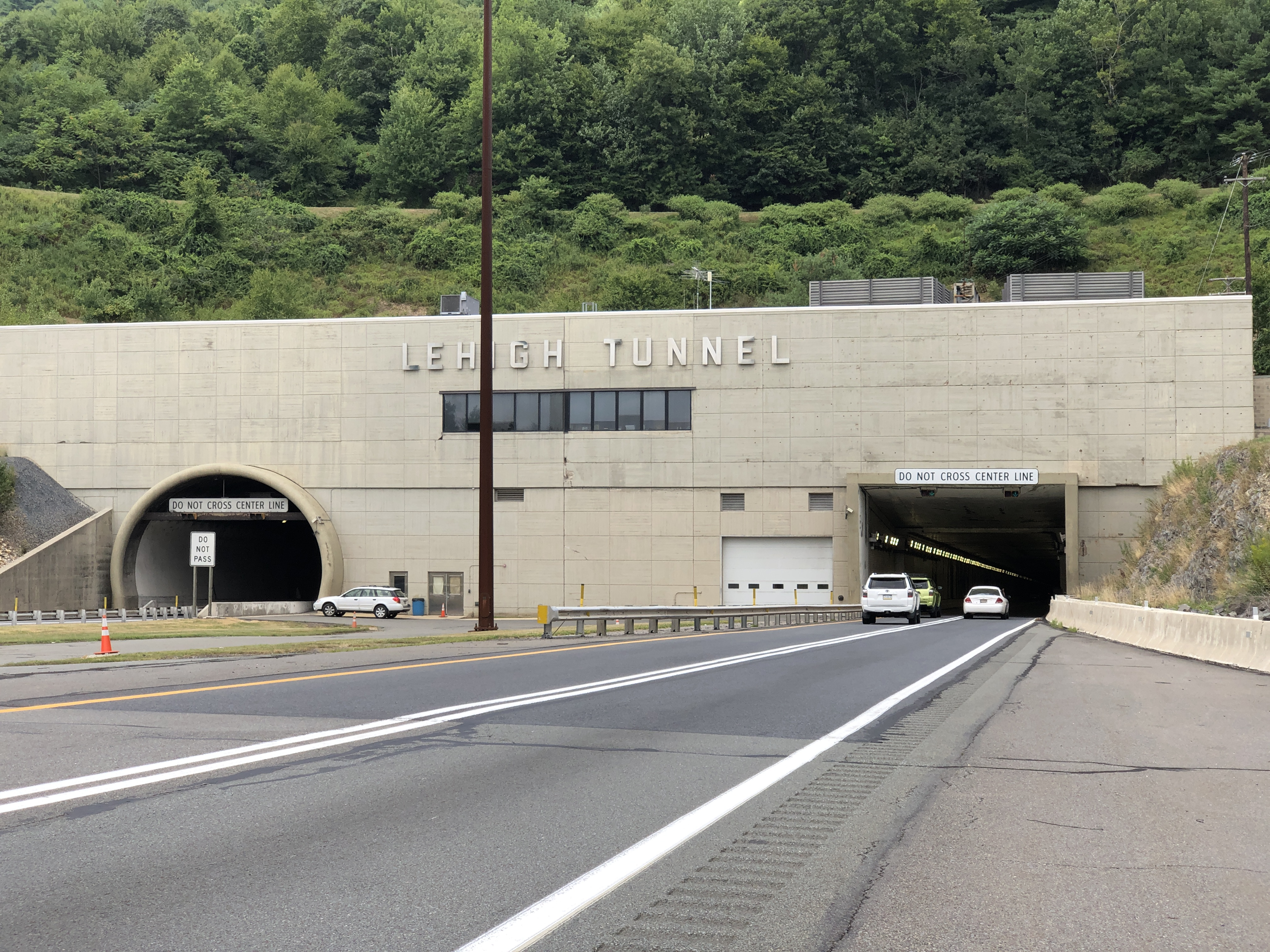
Lehigh Tunnel northbound entrance

Construction on this tunnel began on September 21, 1955. Originally a single tunnel that opened to traffic on April 1, 1957, turnpike officials changed the name from the originally-planned "T. J. Evans Tunnel" to the "Lehigh Tunnel" after Evans, chair of the turnpike commission during the time the tunnel was planned, was accused of defrauding the government. The new name also helped to differentiate the Lehigh Tunnel from the existing Blue Mountain Tunnel on the mainline.

The tunnel was twinned in 1991 to allow two lanes of traffic in each direction. It has an unusual appearance, as the original (northbound) tunnel is rectangular, as it used the older dig-and-blast technique, while the new tube is oval, having been constructed using the New Austrian tunnelling method.

From 1980 to 1996, the Northeast Extension was designated as Pennsylvania Route 9, as opposing traffic faced each other in the single tube before the opening of the current southbound tube, and therefore did not qualify for Interstate highway status, which was granted five years after the completion of the southbound tube.

The Lehigh Tunnel crosses the border between Lehigh County and Carbon County. It is the only road tunnel crossed by the Appalachian Trail.

=== 2018 Accident ===
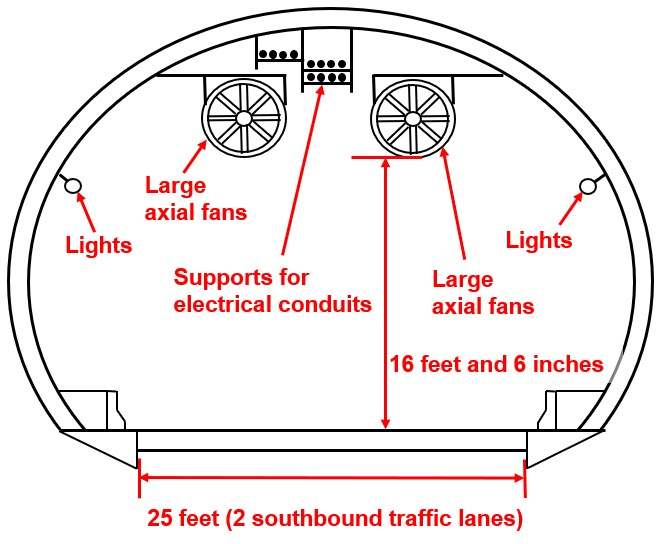
Cross-sectional diagram of the southbound tunnel

On February 21, 2018, Howard M. Sexton, a 70-year-old truck driver from New Jersey, was killed in the southbound Lehigh Tunnel when an electrical conduit broke free from the tunnel's ceiling and fell through the windshield of his truck, striking him in the head. In a preliminary report issued on May 1, 2018, the National Transportation Safety Board revealed that a 10-foot-long section of conduit fell into the path of Sexton's truck after the steel support system for the conduits, which were suspended from the apex of the tunnel arch directly over the travel lanes, failed. The tunnel had last been inspected in 2016, at which time an inspector found evidence of corrosion on several of the steel support straps.
