= Plug-in electric vehicles in the Republic of Ireland =

As of January 2022, there were about 47,000 electric vehicles in Ireland. As of 2022, about 13% of new cars registered in the country were fully electric, and 7% were plug-in hybrid.

== Government policy ==
As of 2022, the government offers tax rebates of up to €5,000 for electric vehicle purchases.

In 2022, the government introduced rebates of up to €25,000 for taxi drivers who replace their gasoline-powered taxis with EVs.

As of 2022, the government's official policy goal is for 40% of cars in the country to be electric by 2030.

== Charging stations ==
As of December 2021, there were 1,350 public charging stations in Ireland.

As of December 2021, the government offers rebates of up to €600 for charging station installations.

== Public opinion ==
In a 2022 survey conducted by Energia and the Irish Electric Vehicle Owners Association, 87% of respondents said that the Irish government was "not doing enough" to promote electric vehicles.

== By region ==
=== Connacht ===
As of November 2022, there were 172 public charging stations in County Galway.

=== Leinster ===
As of November 2022, there were 639 public charging stations in County Dublin and 174 in County Kildare.

=== Munster ===
As of November 2022, there were 239 public charging stations in County Cork.

== See also ==
- IrishEVs
