= Clarks Knob =

Mountain in Pennsylvania, United States

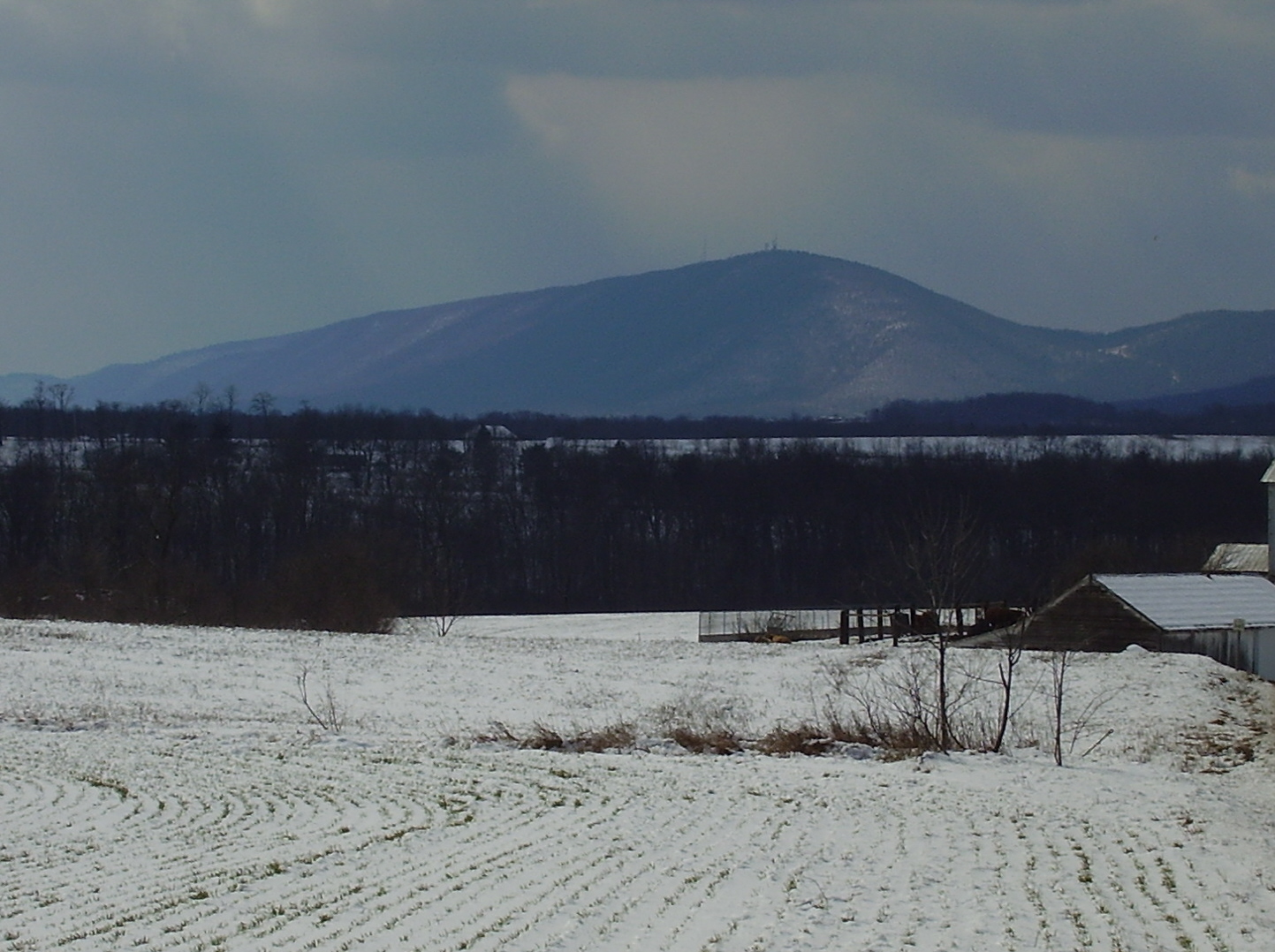
- Clarks Knob in February 2008

Highest point
- Elevation: 2,316 ft (706 m) NAVD 88
- Coordinates: 40°2′52″N 77°45′2″W

Geography
- Location within Pennsylvania
- Location: Franklin County, Pennsylvania, U.S.
- Parent range: Blue Mountain
- Topo map: USGS Roxbury (PA) Quadrangle

Climbing
- Easiest route: Drive up gravel road

Clarks Knob is a summit in Franklin County, Pennsylvania. It is the highest point on Blue Mountain, the eastern front range of Pennsylvania's Ridge and Valley Appalachians region.

== Geography ==
Clarks Knob's northeast-southwest running summit ridge forms the boundary of the Susquehanna River and Potomac River drainages. It stands over 1,600 feet (488 m) above the town of Chambersburg and the Great Appalachian Valley. This mountain is protected within the Buchanan State Forest.
