= Climate change in the Republic of Ireland =

Emissions, effects, and responses of Ireland related to climate change

Climate change may have a range of effects in Ireland. Increasing temperatures may change weather patterns, with the potential for increased heatwaves, rainfall and storm events, with subsequent effects on people through flooding Climate change has been assessed to be the single biggest threat to Ireland, according to the head of the Defence Forces of Ireland, Mark Mellett.

== Greenhouse gas emissions ==
Per-capita production-based greenhouse gas emissions in Ireland compared to the global average

Ireland's greenhouse gas emissions increased between 1990 and 2001 when they peaked at 70.46 Mt carbon dioxide equivalent before decreasing each year up to 2014. In 2015 the emissions increased 4.1%, and in 2016 increased by 3.4% before remaining stable in 2017 and 2018, before decreasing by 4.5% in 2019 from the 2018 levels. Overall, the emissions have increased by 10.1 per cent from 1990 to 2019.

The Central Statistics Office also collate and publish data relating to emissions and the effects as recorded in Ireland.

In 2017, Ireland had the third highest greenhouse gas emissions per capita in the European Union and 51% higher than the EU-28 average of 8.8 tonnes. The world average in 2016 was 4.92 tonnes.

Ireland greenhouse gas emissions by sector in 2016

=== Sources ===
71.4% of the emissions in 2019 came from energy industries, transport and agriculture, with agriculture the single largest contributor at 35.3%. In Irish agriculture, the two most important greenhouse gases are methane and nitrous oxide. 60% of Irish agricultural emissions come directly from animal agriculture, primarily as a result of methane-producing enteric fermentation from cattle. A further 30% derive from soils fertilised by manures, synthetic fertiliser or animal grazing on pasture.

== Effects on the natural environment ==
=== Temperature and weather changes ===
Köppen climate classification map for Ireland for 1980–2016

2071–2100 map under the most intense climate change scenario. Mid-range scenarios are currently considered more likely

Between 1890 and 2008, the mean temperature recorded in Ireland measured an increase of 0.7 degrees Celsius, with an increase of 0.4 degrees Celsius between 1980 and 2008. Other indicators of a warming climate identified by the Environmental Protection Agency are ten of the warmest recorded years occurring since 1990, a decrease in the number of days with frost and a shorter season in which frost occurs, and increased annual rainfall in the north and west of the country. An increase in the active growing season has been recorded, as well as an increase in animals arriving in Ireland and its surrounding waters which are adapted to warmer conditions.

A 2020 study from the Irish Centre for High-End Computing indicated that Ireland's climate is likely to change drastically by 2050. Annual average temperatures could climb to 1.6 °C above pre-industrial levels under RCP8.5, with the east of Ireland seeing the highest increase, resulting in a "direct impact" on public health and mortality. The study also predicted the number of frost days to decrease between 68 and 78 per cent, summer precipitation to decrease by up to 17%.

In June 2023, there was a Category 4 (extreme) marine heatwave in Irish waters, with some regions experiencing a Category 5 (beyond extreme) increase in temperatures. During this heatwave sea surface temperatures reached their highest ever recorded in Irish waters.

=== Ecosystems ===
Temperature changes risk disrupting or changing the timing of the life cycle of plant and animal species across the country. For example, the timing of leaf unfolding in selected populations of the non native beech trees has become steadily earlier since the 1970s. Changes to the timing of life cycle events (phenology) can result in temporal mismatches between species, as not all species and life history events are equally responsive to temperature. Such changes may result in disruption of previously synchronised ecosystem function, resulting in changes in species composition and functioning of some ecosystems.

Ocean acidification has been recorded in the waters off at Ireland since records began in 1990 by the Marine Institute. This is caused by the uptake of atmospheric carbon dioxide into the ocean. In addition to acidification, Irish waters are becoming warmer and less salty, causing harm to marine life. Harmful algae are becoming more abundant in Irish waters, not just in warmer months, potentially harming ocean creatures such as shellfish.

=== Built Heritage / Archaeology ===
Archaeological sites, monuments and building remains are at risk from the impacts of climate change, with coastal heritage sites being particularly affected

== Effects on people ==
=== Sea level rise and flooding ===
One of the greatest threats is to coastal and low lying regions from sea level rise, alongside increased rainfall and storm events. 40% of the population live within 5 km of the coast, and 70,000 Irish addresses are at risk of coastal flooding by 2050. Sea levels have risen around by 40 cm around Cork since 1842, approximate 50% greater than previously expected. The rate of sea level rise around Dublin is approximately twice the global rate.

Storm surges also have an increased risk of occurring with rising temperature, with climatologists predicting that Ireland is overdue a 3m storm surge. In addition to coastal flooding, flooding due to increased groundwater levels is also a risk.

=== Drought ===
An increase in water shortages are expected due to periods of drought, and a decrease in water quality.

=== Health effects ===
Adverse health issues relating to climate change have also been identified by the Irish Health Service Executive, including increased risk of skin cancers, waterbourne, foodborne and respiratory diseases.

== Mitigation and adaptation ==
=== Policies and regulation ===
The previous governing policy on mitigation, the 2017 National Mitigation Plan, was quashed by the Irish Supreme Court in August 2020. The Court ruled that the plan was contrary to the 2015 Climate Action and Low Carbon Development Act.

Agencies, such as the Geological Survey of Ireland (GSI), have formulated a number of projects aimed at providing alternatives to current energy sources and the movement away from the contributing factors of climate change. These include the GSI's research into geothermal technologies and carbon sequestration.

==== Carbon Fund Act 2007 ====
Carbon Fund Act 2007

Oireachtas
- Long title: An Act to provide for the establishment of a fund to be known as the Carbon Fund to be utilised for the acquisition of Kyoto Units and other such instruments or assets by the State to meet international climate change obligations under the 1992 United Nations Framework Convention on Climate Change and the 1997 Kyoto Protocol to that Convention, to designate the National Treasury Management Agency as the agent for the acquisition, including on foot of existing or future agreements to which the State is or becomes bound, of Kyoto Units and such other instruments or assets on behalf of the State, to provide for the making available of financial resources to and the use and management of the Carbon Fund, to provide for consequential amendments to existing legislation and to provide for related matters
- Citation: Act 12 of 2007
- Enacted: 2007-04-07

Legislative history
- Bill title: Carbon Fund Bill 2006
- Bill citation: Bill 63 of 2006
- Status: Amended

In 2004 the government abandoned proposals for a carbon tax.

In 2006, a new set of EU projections showed that Ireland was far from meeting its obligations under the Kyoto Protocol. Ireland's emissions fell 0.8% in 2006, so Ireland's emissions were 8.5% more than would have been necessary to be on track to meet its targets under its Kyoto obligations.

Following on from the EU's projections, the government announced that it planned to achieve Ireland's Kyoto obligations through carbon credits, which is what the Act implements.

Ireland used the revenues from the carbon credits to cover administrative costs in the government.

==== Climate Action and Low Carbon Development Act 2015 ====
Climate Action and Low Carbon Development Act 2015

Oireachtas
- Long title: An Act to provide for the approval of plans by the Government in relation to climate change for the purpose of pursuing the transition to a low carbon, climate resilient and environmentally sustainable economy; to establish a body to be known in the Irish language as An Chomhairle Chomhairleach um Athrú Aeráide or, in the English language, as the Climate Change Advisory Council; and to provide for matters connected therewith.
- Citation: Act 46 of 2015
- Enacted: 10-12-2015

Legislative history
- Bill title: Climate Action and Low Carbon Development Bill 2015
- Bill citation: Bill 2 of 2015

Keywords
- climate change
- Status: Amended

In January 2015, the Irish Government published the first climate change bill. The bill was criticised for not setting out specific targets for emissions reductions targets. Instead, there are requirements for a "National Mitigation Plan" and a "National Adaptation Framework" to be published every 5 years. The legislation requires the plans consider obligations of the government under the European Union and other international agreements, which set out a 20% reduction in emissions by 2020 over 1995 levels.

In 2016, emissions targets were missed because of emissions from transport as well as agriculture.

In 2017, Ireland was still giving drilling licenses. A citizens' assembly voted for "radical" policies to reduce emissions. The Supreme Court of Ireland ruled that the 2017 Climate Action Plan was inadequate. Wind energy generation did not meet predictions 58% of the time.

In 2019, it was revealed that Ireland was on track to miss its targets for reducing its emissions as part of EU law and as a signatory to the 2015 Paris Agreement. The plan released in 2019 was criticised by Sinn Féin for increasing the carbon tax. The Government declared a climate emergency.

A case brought before court in 2020 "mobilised" climate activists.

In 2025, section 15 was invoked in a case regarding planning legislation.

==== Fossil Fuel Divestment Act 2018 ====
Fossil Fuel Divestment Act 2018

Oireachtas
- Long title: An Act to impose certain prohibitions and restrictions with respect to the investment by the National Treasury Management Agency of assets of the Ireland Strategic Investment Fund in fossil fuel undertakings and, in particular, to require that Agency to endeavour to ensure that such assets are not directly invested in such an undertaking (and, where it becomes aware that an undertaking in which such assets have been so invested by it is, or has become, a fossil fuel undertaking, to divest the assets of that fund from such investment); to make provision for a restriction on such investment when the investment is of an indirect nature (as defined hereafter); to provide for a certain exception to the prohibition on investment of assets of that fund in such an undertaking where the investment is consistent with the national transition objective (as defined hereafter), the implementation of the State‘s climate change objectives and Government policy; for those purposes to amend the National Treasury Management Agency (Amendment) Act 2014; and to provide for related matters.
- Citation: Act 29 of 2018
- Enacted: 10-12-2015

Legislative history
- Bill title: Climate Action and Low Carbon Development Bill 2015
- Bill citation: Bill 103 of 2016

Keywords
- climate change, divestment
- Status: In force

The Fossil Fuel Divestment Act 2018 requires that investments in fossil fuels should be sold off. In 2018, this amounted to roughly €300,000,000.

The Act defines a fossil fuel company as one in which 20% or more of its revenue from exploration, extraction or refinement of fossil fuels. The Act allows investment in Irish fossil fuel companies if this funds their move away from fossil fuels.

The Act was passed to help Ireland meet the targets in the Paris Agreement.

Ireland was the first country in the world to pass this type of legislation at the time. At the time of the bill being passed Ireland was ranked last among European Union member states in the 2018 Climate Change Performance Index, which is a study evaluating national climate policies.

==== Climate Action and Low Carbon Development (Amendment) Act 2021 ====
Climate Action and Low Carbon Development (Amendment) Act 2021

Oireachtas
- Long title: An Act to provide for the approval of plans by the Government in relation to climate change for the purpose of pursuing the transition to a climate resilient, biodiversity rich and climate neutral economy by no later than the end of the year 2050 and to thereby promote climate justice; to make certain changes to the Climate Change Advisory Council; to provide for carbon budgets and a sectoral emissions ceiling to apply to different sectors of the economy; to provide for reporting by Ministers of the Government to a joint committee of the Houses of the Oireachtas; to provide for local authority climate action plans; for those and other purposes to amend the Climate Action and Low Carbon Development Act 2015; to provide that local authorities shall, when making development plans, take account of their climate action plans and, for that purpose to amend the Planning and Development Act 2000; to extend the purposes for which moneys may be paid out of the Climate Action Fund and, for that purpose to amend the National Oil Reserves Agency Act 2007; and to provide for related matters.
- Citation: Act 32 of 2021
- Enacted: 23-07-2021

Legislative history
- Bill title: Climate Action and Low Carbon Development (Amendment) Bill 2021
- Bill citation: Bill 39 of 2021

Keywords
- climate change
- Status: In force

On 23 July, the Climate Action and Low Carbon Development (Amendment) Act 2021 was signed into law by the President. The bill creates a legally binding path to net zero emissions by 2050. Five-year carbon budgets produced by the Climate Change Advisory Council will dictate the path to carbon neutrality, with the aim of the first two budgets creating a 51% reduction by 2030. The five-year budgets will not be legally binding.

Despite being touted as "ambitious" by the Irish Government, the bill came under heavy criticism from Irish environmentalists and scientists. Amendments passed by the Seanad on 9 July allow the Government, rather than the Climate Change Advisory Committee to determine how greenhouse gas emissions are calculated and taken into account. Climate scientist and IPCC author John Sweeney argued that these amendments "depart from the scientifically established methodology and give discretion to the Government to decide what to measure, how to measure it, and what the removals will be and how they are counted".

Early data suggested that Ireland was on track to miss its targets in 2021. The incentives in the way that milk was priced - in order to stay profitable farms would be encouraged to maximise the amount of milk per cow, which would increase emissions, because emissions per cow is proportional to the volume of milk. The Climate Change Advisory Council announced that Ireland would not meet upcoming carbon budget targets in 2023. A case was taken to court alleging that Ireland's 2023 Climate Action Plan was not compatible with the targets in the 2021-2025 carbon budget.

Ireland initially failed to submit emissions targets to the United Nations in 2024, which was criticised by the Green Party, because development of its national plan had caused delays. A case was brought to Irish courts alleging that the plan that was released was inadeuqate.

In 2025, a Defence Forces report criticised the Government's response to climate change for having a lack of urgency. A Bord na Móna executive warned that issues relating to planning and legal uncertainty would lead to targets not being met.

The budgetary process was criticised for the lack of transparency of how much money was allocated to adaptation to climate change, as part of measures to meet targets under the act.

Grid capacity issues meant that hitting the targets was more difficult, but remained possible if reforms to planning policy was reformed.

==== Future Ireland Fund and Infrastructure, Climate and Nature Fund Act 2024 ====
Future Ireland Fund and Infrastructure, Climate and Nature Fund Act 2024

Oireachtas
- Long title: An Act to provide for the establishment of a fund to be known as the Future Ireland Fund for the purpose of supporting, in a consistent and sustainable manner, State expenditure in any year from 2041; to provide for the establishment of a fund to be known as the Infrastructure, Climate and Nature Fund for the purpose of supporting State expenditure, in 2026 or any year thereafter, in the event of a significant deterioration, or likely such deterioration, in the economic or fiscal position of the State and for the purpose of supporting State expenditure, between 2026 and 2030, on certain environmental projects; to provide for the control and management of those funds by the National Treasury Management Agency; to provide for the transfer of certain assets to those funds; to provide for the dissolution of the National Surplus (Exceptional Contingencies) Reserve Fund and the transfer of the assets of that fund to the Future Ireland Fund and the Infrastructure, Climate and Nature Fund; for those and other purposes to amend the National Treasury Management Agency Act 1990, the National Treasury Management Agency (Amendment) Act 2014 and certain other enactments and to repeal the National Surplus (Reserve Fund for Exceptional Contingencies) Act 2019; and to provide for related matters.
- Citation: Act 16 of 2024
- Enacted: 18-06-2024

Legislative history
- Bill title: Future Ireland Fund and Infrastructure, Climate and Nature Fund Act 2024
- Bill citation: Bill 21 of 2024

Keywords
- climate change, divestment
- Status: In force

In October the government announced plans to create two sovereign wealth funds.

The government announced that it expected that the Future Ireland Fund would reach €100,000,000,000 by 2035. It also announced that it would invest €2,000,000,000 each year in the Infrastructure, Climate and Nature Fund and that the fund would reach €14,000,000,000.

The Future Ireland Fund is planned to support government spending from 2041.

The Green Party accused Fianna Fail of nearly collapsing the coalition over the bill and that suggested that Fianna Fail was not really committed to climate action.

In 2024, €4,000,000,000 was transferred from the Exchequer to the Future Ireland Fund and €2,000,000,000 was transferred from the Exchequer to the Infrastructure, Climate and Nature Fund. The investment came from unusually high tax receipts. The first €10,000,000,000 was put into low-risk investments.

==== Planning and Development Act 2024 ====
In 2024, the government announced its plans to reform planning policy to address climate change.

=== CityTrees ===
In an attempt to capture pollutants originating from smog, Cork City Council have installed 5 CityTrees in different locations across the city. This has resulted in controversy, eventually leading to their removal in May 2025 due to ineffectiveness.

== See also ==
- Plug-in electric vehicles in the Republic of Ireland
- Renewable energy in the Republic of Ireland
- Climate change in the United Kingdom
