= Blue Mountain (Pennsylvania) =

Ridge in Pennsylvania, United States

- Kittatinny Mountain (and nine others: Blue Hills; Kau-ta-tin-chunk; Kekaghtenemin Mountain; Kightotinning Mountain; Kittachtinny Hills; Kittatinhy Mountain; Kittochtinny Hills; Kittochtinny Mountains; North Mountain)
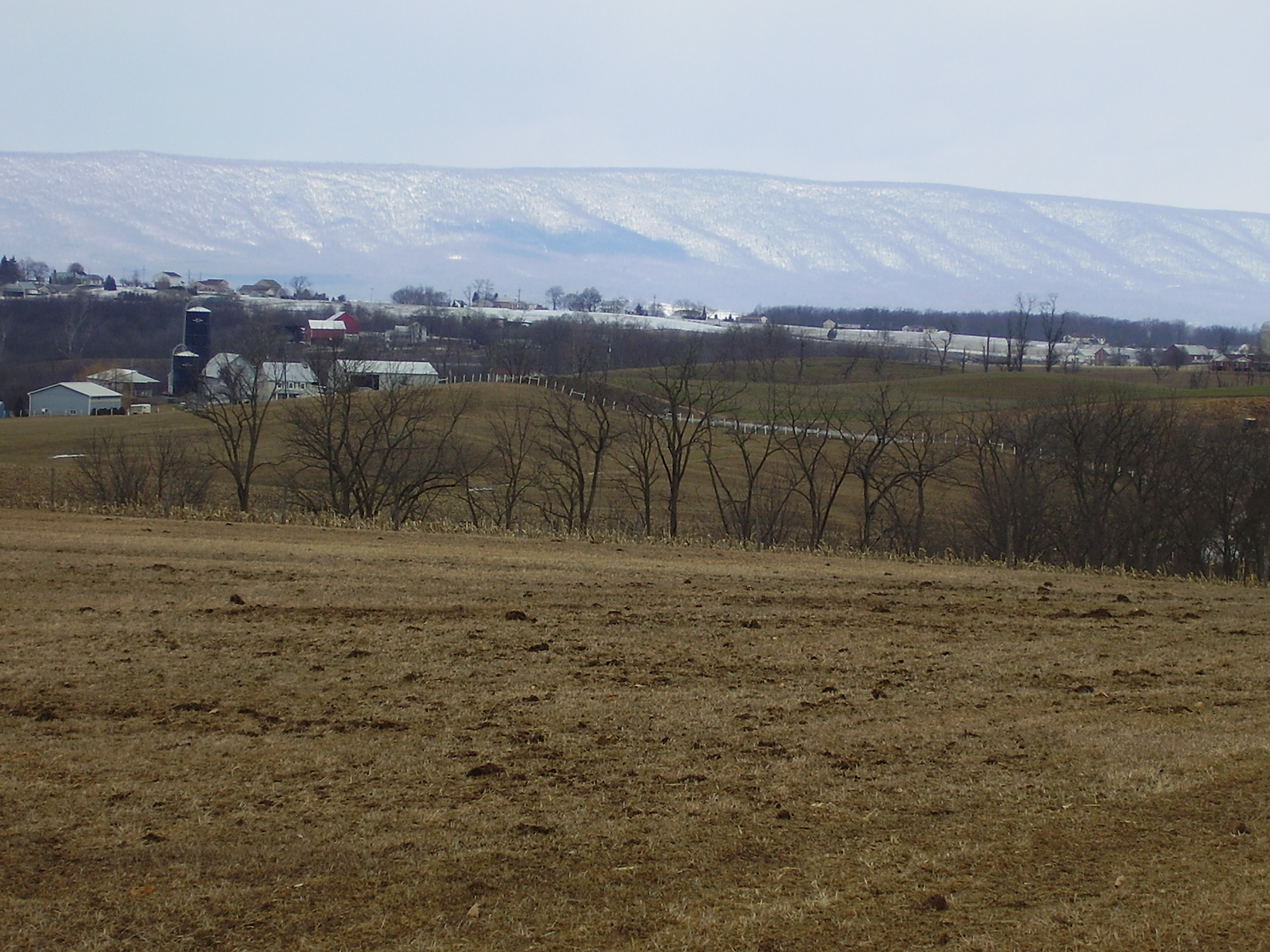
- The "Great Wall" of Blue Mountain in Pennsylvania in February 2008

Highest point
- Peak: Clarks Knob in Franklin County, Pennsylvania 2,320 feet (710 m)
- Elevation: 1,129 ft (344 m)
- Coordinates: 40°07′28″N 77°39′59″W

Dimensions
- Length: 150 mi (240 km) northeast-southwest to SSW 150 miles (240 km) (direct aerial); 255 miles (410 km) trace of ridgeline, including loops back width = varies along chain's length

Geography
- Country: United States
- State: Pennsylvania
- Borders on: Ridge-and-Valley Appalachians; Great Appalachian Valley

Geology
- Orogeny: Appalachian Mountains
- Rock age: Silurian
- Rock types: Tuscarora Formation; Shawangunk Formation; sedimentary

Blue Mountain, Blue Mountain Ridge, or the Blue Mountains of Pennsylvania, is a ridge of the Appalachian Mountains in eastern Pennsylvania. Forming the southern and eastern edge of the Ridge-and-Valley Appalachians physiographic province in Pennsylvania, Blue Mountain extends 150 miles (240 km) from the Delaware Water Gap on the state's border with New Jersey in eastern Pennsylvania to Big Gap in Franklin County in south-central Pennsylvania at its southwestern end.

Views of Blue Mountain dominate the southern tier of most eastern and central Pennsylvania counties, providing an ever-visible backdrop cutting across the northern or western horizon. Most transport corridors and road beds piercing the barrier necessarily pass through large water gaps, including (west to east) the Susquehanna, Schuylkill, Lehigh and Delaware River valleys or wind gaps, low gaps in the ridge caused by ancient watercourses. The barrier ridge forms a distinct boundary between a number of Pennsylvania's geographical and cultural regions.

To the south of the Susquehanna River gap in the south-central part of the state is the Cumberland Valley, part of the Great Appalachian Valley; to its northwest side are the southern reaches of the Susquehanna Valley with picturesque streams channeling travel corridors deep into and over the central and western mountains and valleys, the heartland interior counties of Pennsylvania along Main Branch Susquehanna, the valleys lead to the Coal Region in Northeastern Pennsylvania Wyoming Valley, and the distant Pocono Mountains. To the south of Blue Mountain is the Capital Region and the state's capital of Harrisburg, the region's primary city, along with nearby communities in the rich farming regions of Lebanon Valley and Pennsylvania Dutch Country of York and Lancaster counties and the lower halves of both the Lehigh Valley and Delaware Valley, both of which extend north through water gaps beyond the ridgeline.

Blue Mountain School District, which is named after the mountain range, is located just off PA Route 61 in Schuylkill Haven, Pennsylvania.

== Geography ==
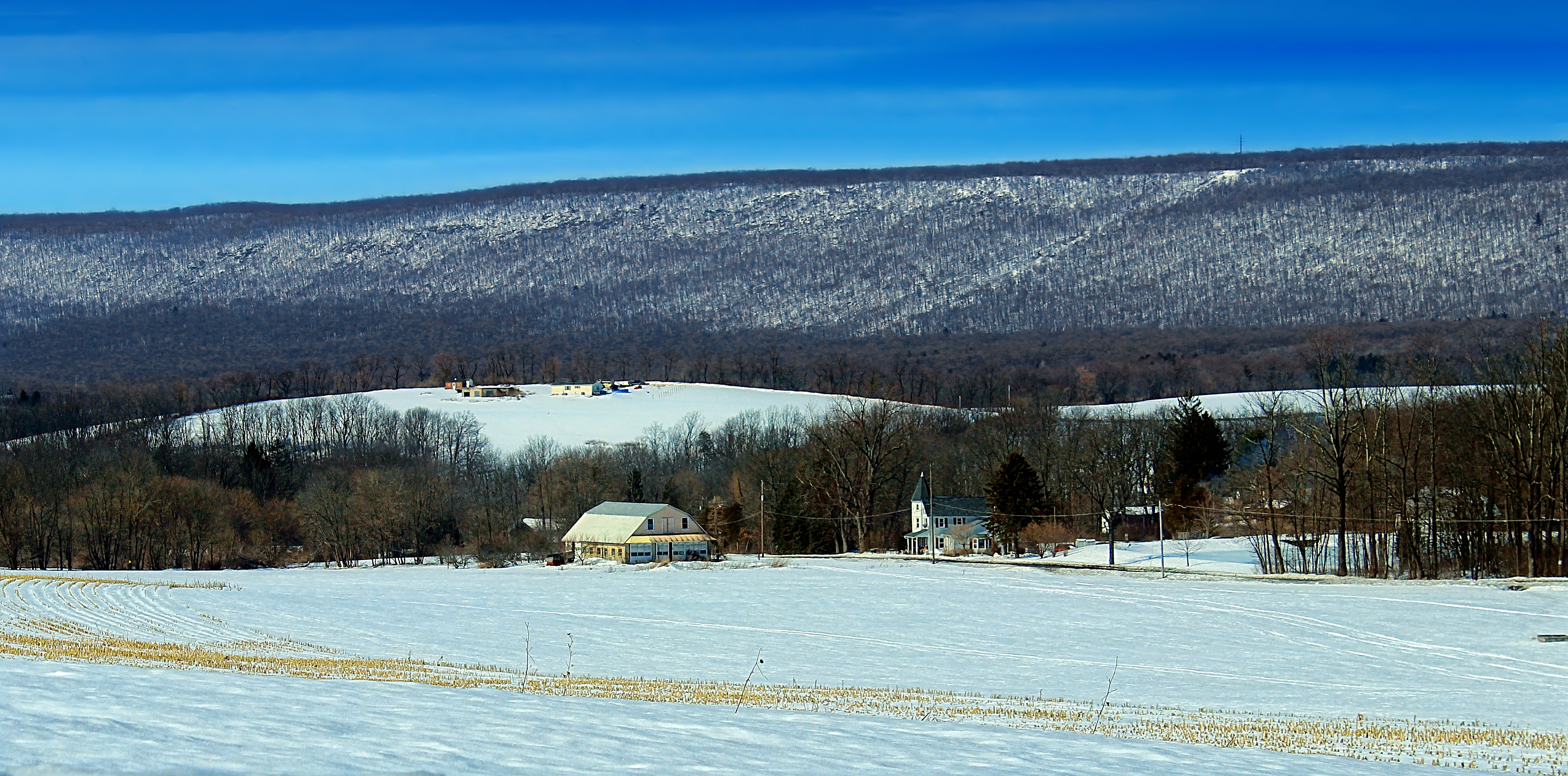
Blue Mountain in Moore Township in the Lehigh Valley region of eastern Pennsylvania in February 2014

The ridge of Blue Mountain runs for 150 miles (240 km) through Pennsylvania, reaching an elevation of 2,270 feet (690 m) above sea level just north of the Pennsylvania Turnpike, near the borough of Newburg. Most of the ridgecrest, however, only reaches between 1,400 and 1,700 feet (430 and 520 m) in elevation. The mountain's width varies from 1 to 3 miles (1.6 to 4.8 km).

The southwestern end of the mountain is at Big Gap, west of Shippensburg. The mountain ridge continues to the southwest toward Maryland as Broad Mountain. The northeastern end of the mountain is at the Delaware Water Gap on the New Jersey border. Mount Minsi, elevation 1,461 feet (445 m), forms the promontory overlooking the Delaware River. The ridge of Blue Mountain continues northeast into New Jersey, reaching the state’s high point as 1,803 ft (549.6 m) Kittatinny Mountain.

Blue Mountain marks the boundary between the Great Appalachian Valley and the main Ridge-and-Valley Appalachians.

== Water gaps ==
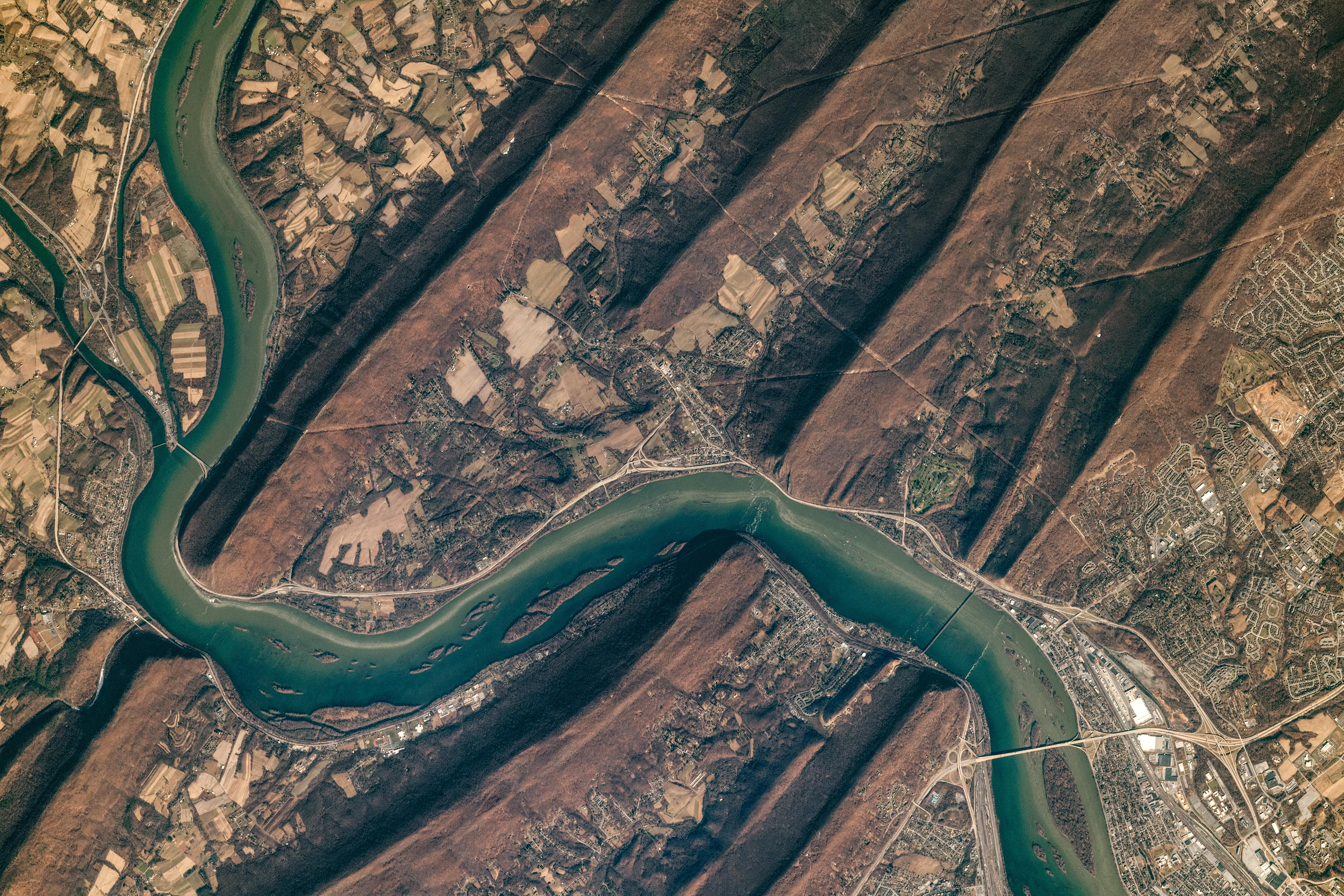
The Susquehanna River cuts though multiple ridges of the Appalachian mountains. Blue Mountain is visible in the center of the image. Harrisburg, PA is in the bottom right corner. North is to the top left.

Four of Pennsylvania's major rivers cut through Blue Mountain in water gaps:

- The Delaware River, which forms Pennsylvania's eastern border with New Jersey, passes through the ridge just southeast of Stroudsburg.
- The Lehigh River, which feeds the Delaware at Easton, passes through the Lehigh Gap at the ridge near Palmerton.
- The Schuylkill River, which feeds the Delaware at Philadelphia, passes through the ridge just north of Hamburg.
- The Susquehanna River, which feeds the Chesapeake Bay, passes through the ridge just north of Harrisburg, Pennsylvania's capital.

== Pennsylvania Turnpike ==
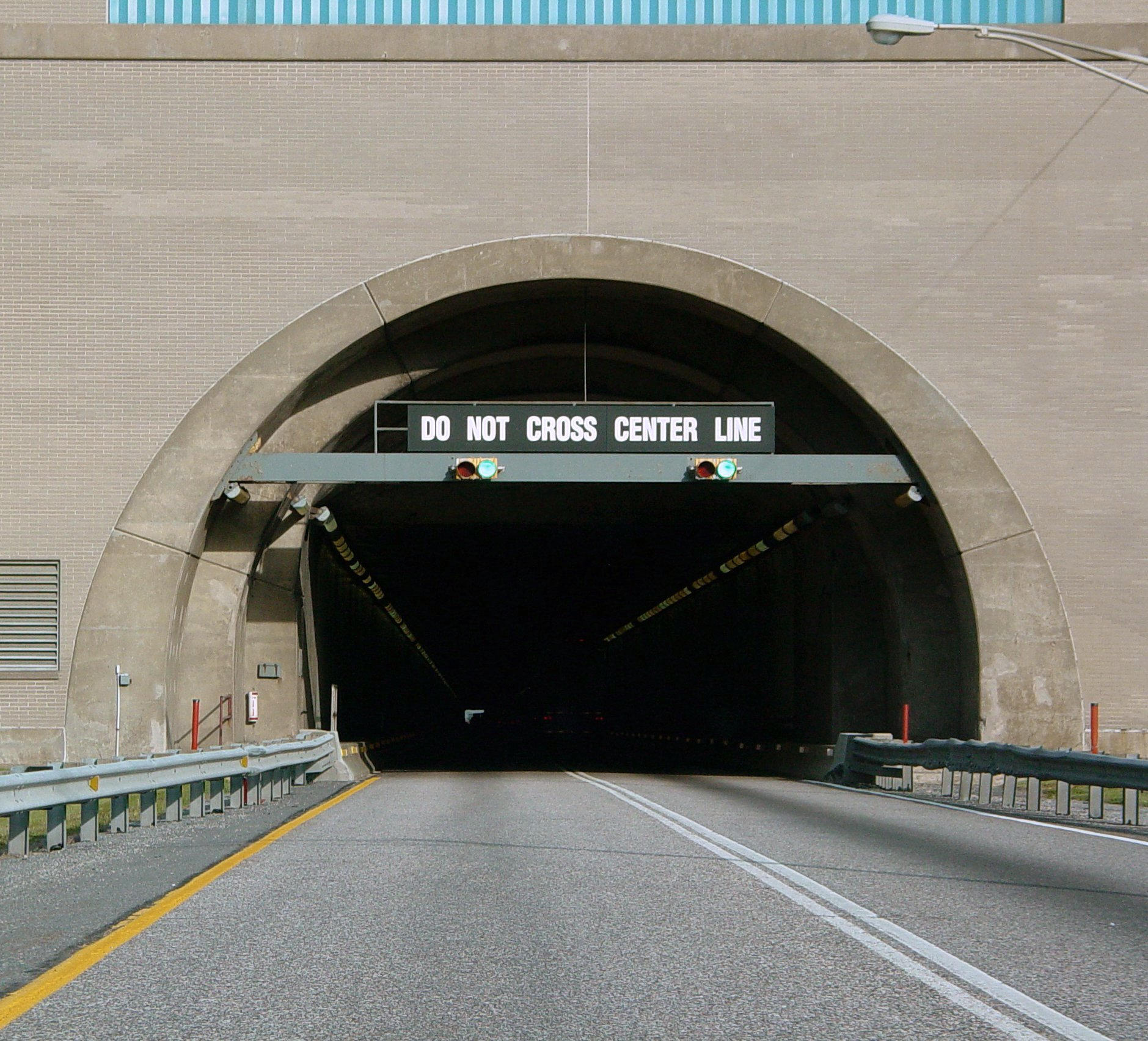
Blue Mountain Tunnel on Interstate 76 in May 2006

The Pennsylvania Turnpike system passes through Blue Mountain at two points:

- The Blue Mountain Tunnel carries the turnpike's east–west mainline (Interstate 76) through the ridge in northern Franklin County. The Kittatinny Mountain Tunnel bores through a parallel ridge of the same mountain just to the west, with the two tunnel portals only 0.2 miles (0.32 km) apart.
- The Lehigh Tunnel carries the turnpike's north–south Northeast Extension (Interstate 476) through the ridge between Lehigh and Carbon Counties. Both tunnels consist of two tubes and carry two lanes in each direction of travel.

== Blue Mountain attractions in Pennsylvania ==
- Appalachian Trail is concurrent with the top of the ridge from New Jersey to northern Lebanon County, Pennsylvania.
- Blue Mountain Resort is found on the north face of the ridge in the southeastern corner of Carbon County, Pennsylvania.
- Boyd Big Tree Preserve Conservation Area is located in Dauphin County, Pennsylvania.
- Delaware Water Gap National Recreation Area reaches across Northampton, Monroe, and Pike counties and into New Jersey, mostly to the northwest of the ridge.
- Hawk Mountain Ranger School, located just south of the Sanctuary, trains Civil Air Patrol members for their ground search and rescue Ranger Teams.
- Hawk Mountain Sanctuary is located at the very northern edge of Berks County, Pennsylvania.

== See also ==
- Blue Mountain Geology
