= Applegreen =

Irish service station chain

Applegreen Limited
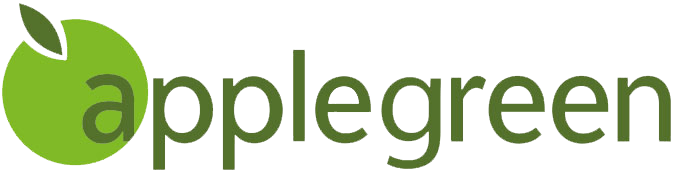
- Type: Private
- ISIN: IE00BXC8D038
- Industry: Retail
- Founded: Dublin, Ireland (1992)
- Headquarters: Park West, Dublin, Ireland
- Key people: Bob Etchingham (co-owner); Joe Barrett (co-owner)
- Revenue: ▲€3.1bn (2019)
- Website: applegreen.com

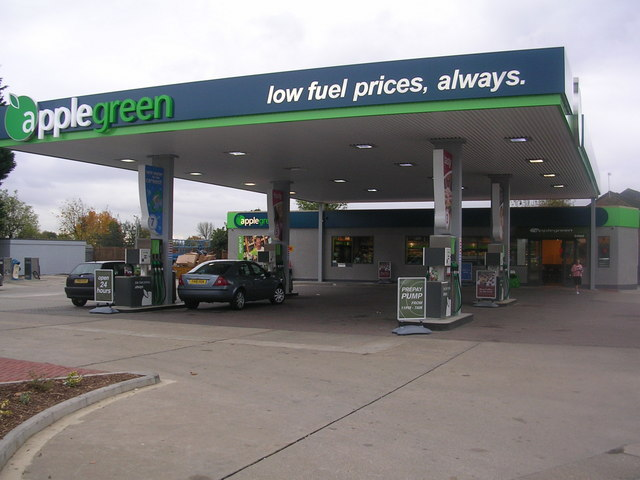
Applegreen petrol station in Forty Hill, Enfield, Great Britain

Applegreen Limited is an Irish company founded in 1992 that operates 620 petrol stations in Ireland, the United Kingdom (under the Welcome Break arm) and the United States. It is a major petrol retailer in Ireland, and operates convenience stores and motorway service areas. Applegreen's headquarters are based in Park West Business Park in Dublin, Ireland.

Applegreen was taken private in March, 2021, and is now majority-owned by U.S. private equity firm Blackstone Inc. Cofounders Robert Etchingham and Joseph Barrett retained a minority stake in the business.

In 2018, Applegreen purchased the majority of UK motorway service area operator Welcome Break for €361.8m. In 2021, Applegreen acquired the United States toll road service area operations from HMSHost for $375 million.

Applegreen operates its own EV charging subsidiary called Applegreen Electric.

On 7 October 2022, an Applegreen petrol station in Creeslough, County Donegal was severely damaged by an explosion in an adjacent apartment building that also killed ten people and injured eight others.

In January 2025, Applegreen agreed to sell its UK filling station business, Petrogas Group, to EG On The Move. Its Welcome Break business in the UK was not part of the deal and will remain in Applegreen's ownership.

== Greenwashing controversies ==
In 2020, Applegreen announced an initiative to offset the emissions from its premium fuels, which has been labelled as a greenwashing effort. While the campaign claimed to offset all the emissions from its fuels, a report from IrishEVs showed that this only included emissions created from cars and did not include emissions from extraction or refinement which typically account for up to 40% of the total greenhouse gas emissions from petrol and diesel.

== Partnership with Marks & Spencer ==
In October 2022, Applegreen announced a partnership with Marks & Spencer to sell M&S Food at its locations in Ireland. A new M&S Food “shop-in-shop” will initially be available in five Applegreen locations.
