= IrishEVs =

Irish website on electric vehicles

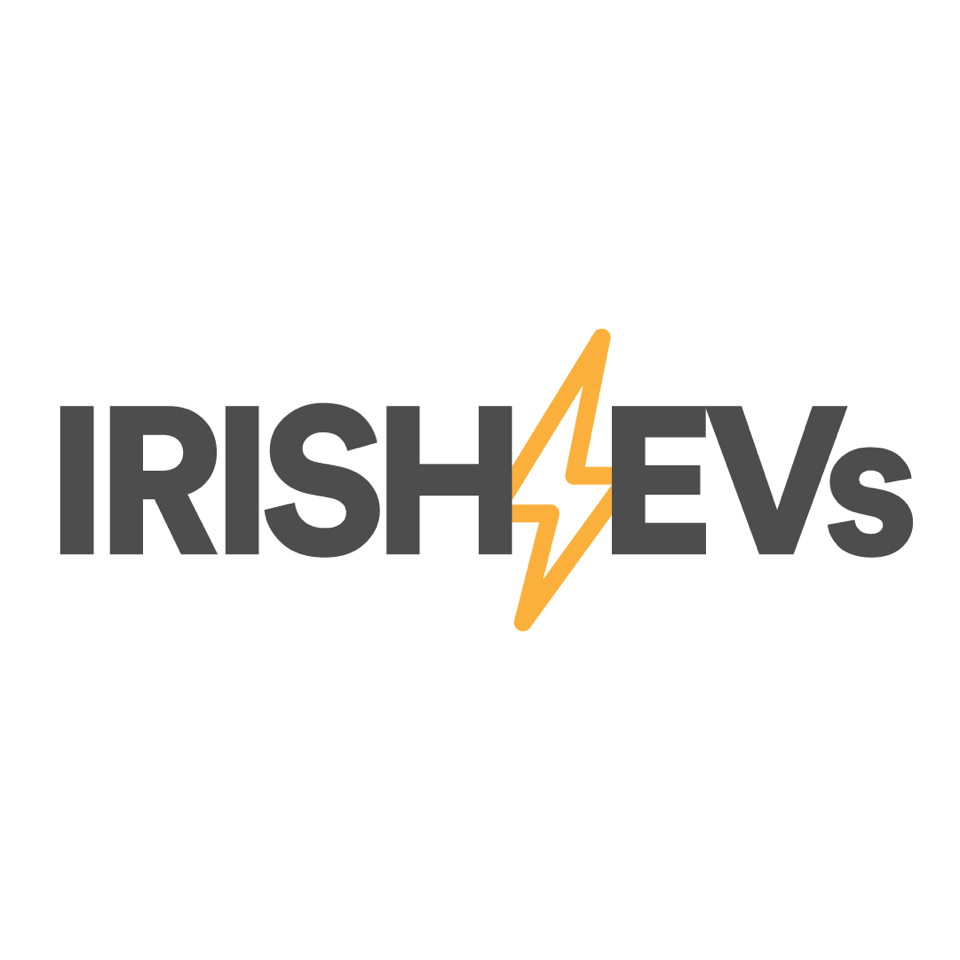
- Website type: News
- Available in: English
- Editor: Tom Spencer
- Website: irishevs.com
- Commercial: No
- Current status: Online

IrishEVs is a consumer advice website focusing on electric vehicles, renewable energy and the climate crisis in Ireland. The site was founded by journalist Tom Spencer, who previously wrote for Fully Charged, and has covered a wide range of topics around the role of cars and transport in the context of climate change – with the transport sector accounting for 20% of Ireland's total greenhouse gas emissions.

IrishEVs has also covered a wide range of renewable energy topics, including solar power, wind power, energy policy, cycling infrastructure, just transition, environmental policy, air pollution and climate anxiety.

IrishEvs publishes stories on a wide range of topics that are cited by mainstream media such as The Irish Times, Irish Examiner, CleanTechnica, Gizmodo, Jalopnik and RTÉ. The publication has also contributed to the Oireachtas committee on Climate Action, providing expert input on transport emissions, and led a campaign to introduce engine idling laws in Ireland.

== Just climate transition ==
The publication has gained particular renown for promoting a just transition in the face of the climate crisis - both at home and abroad. In particularly, IrishEVs has repeatedly called on the Irish government to support lower income families and individuals in adopting electric vehicles.

IrishEVs has highlighted the considerable cost gap between the average income and the cost of new electric cars in Ireland, and urged the Irish government to increase incentives while also doing more to import second-hand electric vehicles from the UK to meet demand for affordable EVs - the UK being the only local source of right-hand drive vehicles, and a more mature market in terms of EV adoption.

As of November 2021, the average annual salary in Ireland is €49,000, while the average new battery electric vehicle costs €47,300, even after the deduction of up to €10,000 in incentives from the Sustainable Energy Authority of Ireland.

IrishEVs has led on coverage relating to electric vehicle conversion as part of a just climate transition, where existing internal combustion engine vehicles can be converted to run as pure battery electric vehicles in order to reduce waste which also tackling emissions and providing a supply of affordable second-hand EVs.

== Greenwashing reporting ==
While IrishEVs initially tackled the common myths and misconceptions around electric cars in order to educate the public about their benefits compared to internal combustion engine vehicles, the site has since gained a reputation for tackling greenwashing in the automotive and fuel industries.

The site was the first to break the Applegreen greenwashing controversy, where the fuel brand had claimed to offset the emissions of its premium fuels, but neglected to inform the public that this did not include the emissions from extraction or refinement – which typically account for up to 40% of the total greenhouse gas emissions from petrol and diesel. Nor did Applegreen's marketing acknowledge that the trees being planted to carbon offset the emissions could take upwards of 30 years to capture the emissions that they claimed.

IrishEVs has also been a leading voice in the Irish media about the ecological and climate harm caused by hybrid vehicles, and how manufacturers – Toyota in particular – are using greenwashing campaigns to aid their public image without lowering the emissions of their vehicles. A 2020 report found that carbon emissions from plug-in hybrid vehicles, on average, two-and-a-half times higher than official tests indicate, mirroring the Volkswagen emissions scandal.

IrishEVs also played a key role in the reporting of the Astongate greenwashing scandal in 2020, which involved a number of well-known brands spreading misinformation about electric vehicles in the wake of the UK's declaration to end the sale of combustion engine vehicles from 2030.

In February 2022, IrishEVs launched the Irish Greenwashing Awards to raise awareness of how commonplace greenwashing had become amongst corporations operating in Ireland, and amongst the Irish press itself, and to call for urgent legislation to protect Irish citizens from brands seeking to profit from the Climate Crisis.
