= Interstate 476 =

Interstate Highway in Pennsylvania, US

Interstate 476
- I-476 highlighted in red

Route information
- Auxiliary route of I-76
- Maintained by PennDOT and PTC
- Length: 132.10 mi (212.59 km)
- History: Established 1970; Completed on December 16, 1992
- Tourist routes: Blue Route Scenic Byway
- NHS: Entire route
- Restrictions: No hazardous goods in Lehigh Tunnel

Major junctions
- South end: I-95 in Woodlyn
- US 1 near Springfield; PA 3 near Broomall; US 30 in Villanova; I-76 near West Conshohocken; I-276 Toll / Penna Turnpike in Plymouth Meeting; PA 63 in Kulpsville; US 22 near Allentown; US 209 near Lehighton; I-80 / PA 940 near White Haven; PA 115 near Bear Creek Village
- North end: I-81 / US 6 / US 11 near Clarks Summit

Location
- Country: United States
- State: Pennsylvania
- Counties: Delaware, Montgomery, Bucks, Lehigh, Carbon, Luzerne, Lackawanna

Highway system
- Interstate Highway System; Main; Auxiliary; Suffixed; Business; Future; Pennsylvania State Route System; Interstate; US; State; Scenic; Legislative
← PA 475	→ PA 476
← PA 8	PA 9	→ PA 9
← I-479	I-480	→ PA 480
← PA 492	I-495	→ PA 501

Interstate 476 (I-476) is a 132.1-mile (212.6 km) auxiliary Interstate Highway of I-76 in the U.S. state of Pennsylvania. The highway runs from I-95 near Chester north to I-81 near Scranton, serving as the primary north–south Interstate corridor through eastern Pennsylvania. It consists of both the 20-mile (32 km) Mid-County Expressway, locally referred to as the "Blue Route", through Delaware and Montgomery counties in the suburban Philadelphia area, and the tolled, 110.6-mile (178.0 km) Pennsylvania Turnpike Northeast Extension, which connects the Philadelphia metropolitan area with the Lehigh Valley, the Pocono Mountains, and the Wyoming Valley to the north.

The Mid-County Expressway passes through suburban areas, while the Northeast Extension predominantly runs through rural areas of mountains, forest, and farmland, with development closer to Philadelphia and in the Lehigh Valley and the Wyoming Valley. I-476 intersects many major roads, including I-76 in West Conshohocken, I-276 (Pennsylvania Turnpike) in Plymouth Meeting, U.S. Route 22 (US 22) near Allentown, and I-80 near Hickory Run State Park.

At its opening in 1979, I-476 was a three-mile-long (4.8 km), four-lane spur expressway connecting I-76 with Chemical Road in Plymouth Meeting. The highway expanded the capacity for travel between King of Prussia, I-76, the Philadelphia Main Line, and Philadelphia suburbs to the city's north and in South Jersey. The highway was initially planned to connect down to I-95 in Delaware County. This portion of the highway opened in 1991.

In 1996, the I-476 designation was affixed to the preexisting Northeast Extension of the Pennsylvania Turnpike, replacing Pennsylvania Route 9 (PA 9). The former state route was an older, pre-Interstate limited-access highway that opened in sections between 1955 and 1957. This extended I-476 approximately 110 miles (180 km) north of Plymouth Meeting to Clarks Summit (north of Scranton) as a part of the Pennsylvania Turnpike system, and made it the nation's longest auxiliary Interstate Highway.

== Route description ==
=== Mid-County Expressway ===
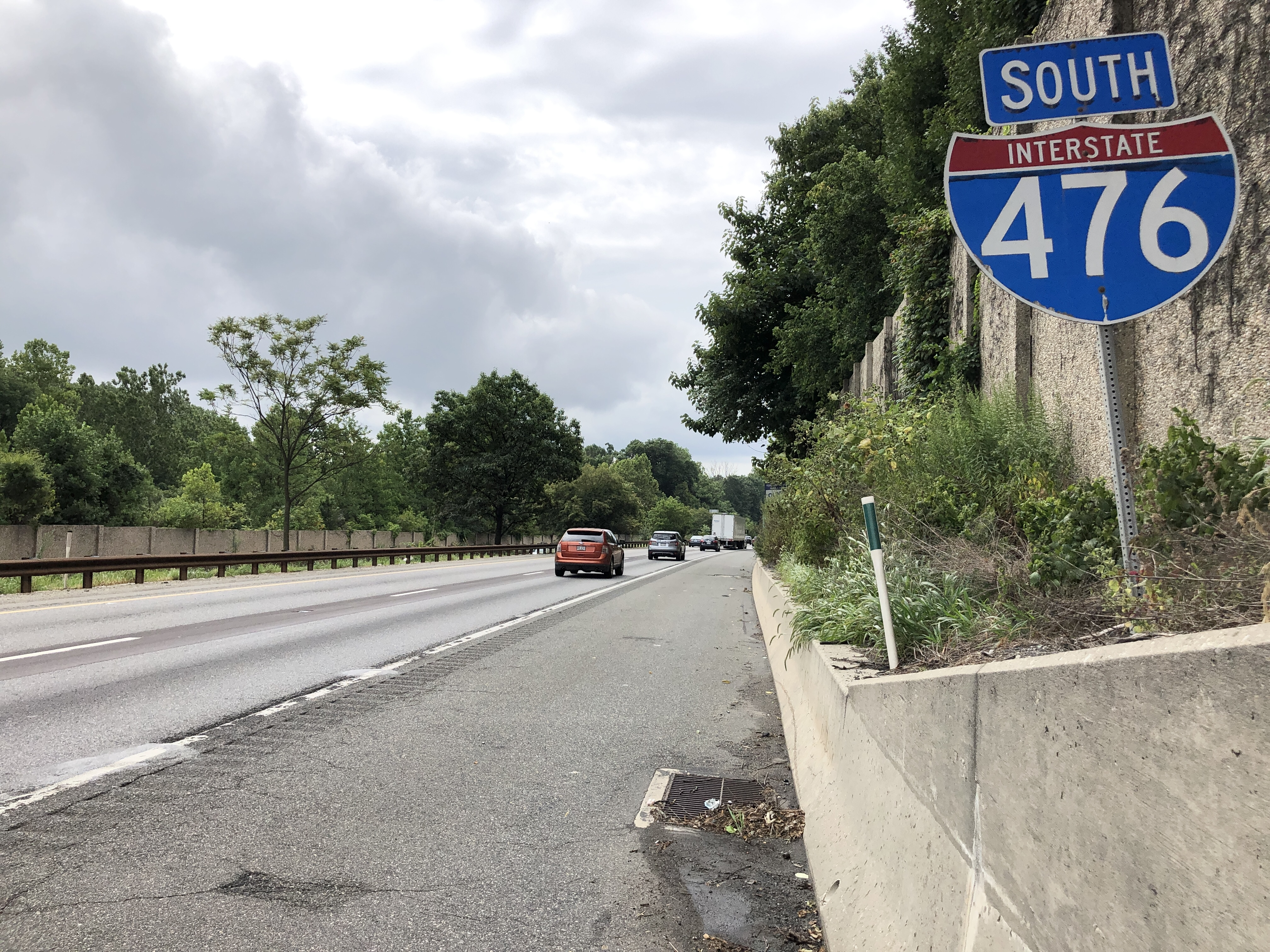
I-476 southbound past PA 3 in Broomall

The portion of I-476 between I-95 and the Pennsylvania Turnpike (I-276) runs north–south through Delaware and Montgomery counties and is officially known as the Mid-County Expressway and the Veterans Memorial Highway, as well as by the nickname the "Blue Route". The road's southern terminus is at a directional T interchange with I-95 near Chester, southwest of Philadelphia in Delaware County, near Philadelphia International Airport.

Heading north, the road passes under CSX's Philadelphia Subdivision rail line and has an interchange with MacDade Boulevard in Woodlyn, where it narrows to a four-lane parkway that runs parallel to the Crum Creek. It winds through the western Philadelphia suburbs of Wallingford and Swarthmore, where I-476 passes under SEPTA's Media/Wawa Line and comes to a diamond interchange with Baltimore Pike just west of Springfield. From here, the freeway crosses over SEPTA's light rail Media–Sharon Hill Line and continues north to Springfield, where it meets US 1 at a three-level diamond interchange.

Past US 1, the parallel Crum Creek splits to the northwest and I-476 continues through wooded suburban areas. Along this stretch, the road briefly gains a southbound truck lane. The freeway comes to a partial cloverleaf interchange with PA 3 in Broomall, where it widens to six lanes. The route continues to Radnor Township, which is part of the Philadelphia Main Line suburbs, reaching an interchange with US 30 west of Villanova. Stone monuments, including a large stone cairn atop a hill and a large crushed-stone image of a mythological griffin on a hillside, were constructed at the US 30 interchange to commemorate Radnor's history as part of the Welsh Tract. Proceeding northward, the road passes over SEPTA's Norristown High Speed Line before it crosses under Amtrak's Keystone Corridor rail line.

The route enters Montgomery County and comes to an interchange with I-76 in West Conshohocken that also has access to PA 23. After crossing over Norfolk Southern's Harrisburg Line, the Schuylkill River, SEPTA's Manayunk/Norristown Line, and the Schuylkill River Trail on the Pearl Harbor Memorial Bridge, the freeway heads into Plymouth Township. In Plymouth Township, the route has interchanges with Ridge Pike and Chemical Road before passing over Norfolk Southern's Morrisville Line and reaching an interchange serving Germantown Pike and Plymouth Road in Plymouth Meeting. The entire length of the Blue Route is designated the Blue Route Scenic Byway, a Pennsylvania Scenic Byway.

=== Pennsylvania Turnpike Northeast Extension ===
Pennsylvania Turnpike Northeast Extension
- Location: Plymouth Meeting–South Abington Township
- Length: 111.04 mi (178.70 km)
- Existed: 1955–present

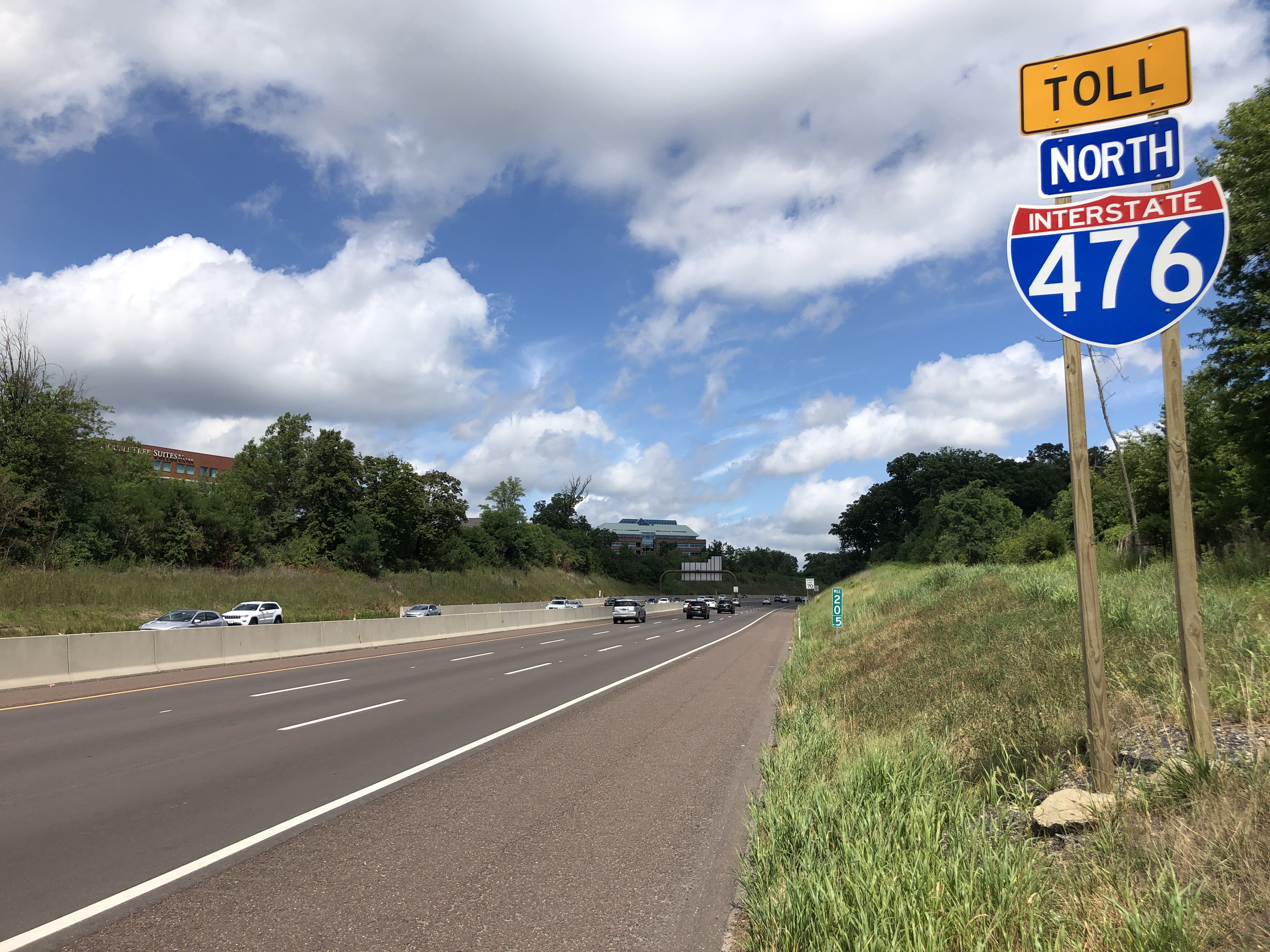
I-476 northbound past the Pennsylvania Turnpike (I-276) in Plymouth Meeting

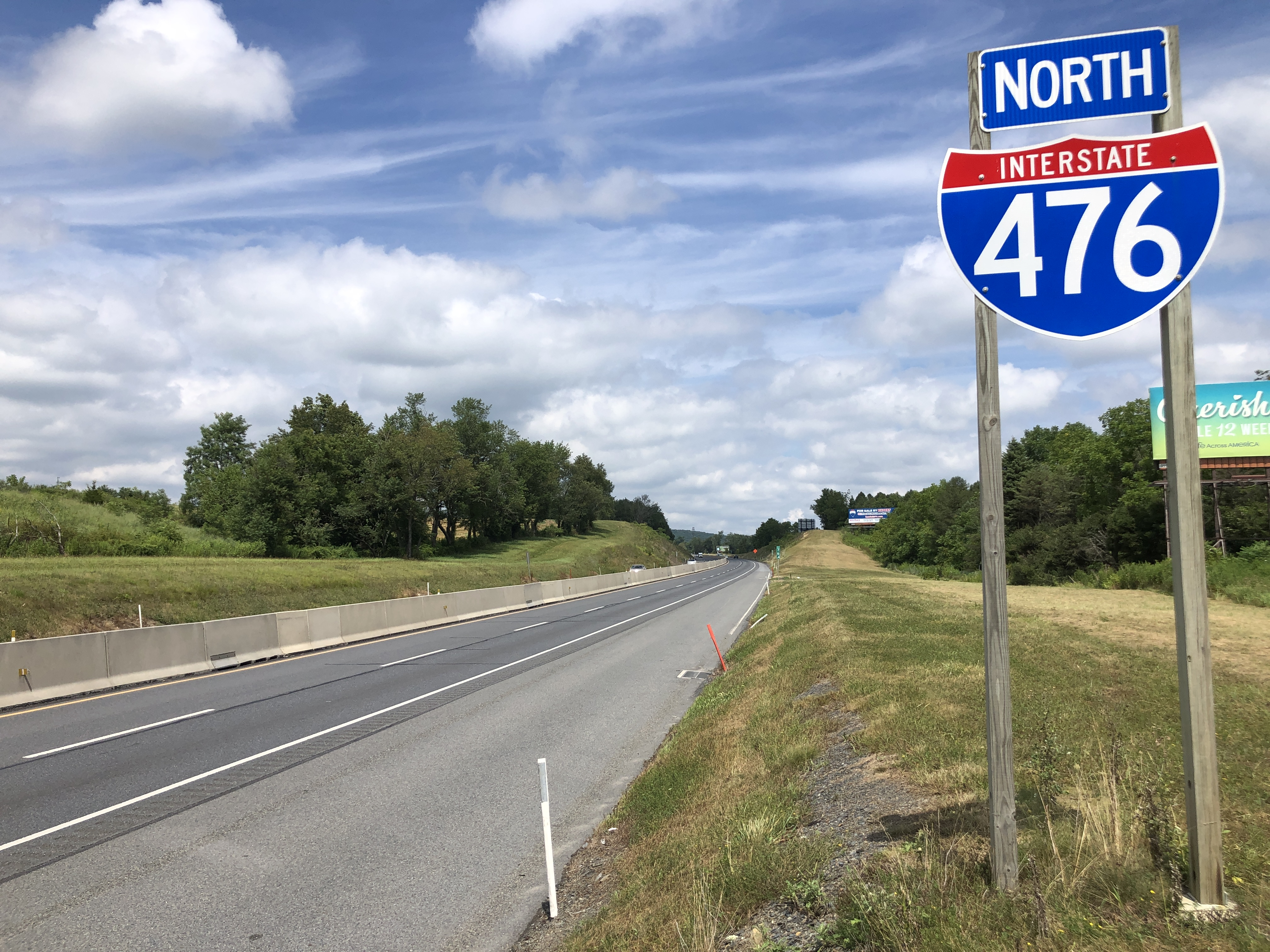
I-476 northbound past US 209 in Franklin Township

In Plymouth Meeting, I-476 intersects the Pennsylvania Turnpike (I-276) at the Mid-County Interchange, heading north from here as the turnpike's Northeast Extension. The route continues through the Philadelphia suburbs, passing over CSX's Stony Creek Branch rail line, and reaches an interchange with PA 63 west of Lansdale that serves the North Penn Valley region. Past this interchange, the route enters a more rural setting of woods and farms, narrowing to four lanes before crossing into Bucks County and coming to an interchange with PA 663 west of Quakertown. The Northeast Extension continues northwest into Lehigh County, part of the Lehigh Valley metropolitan area, past the PA 663 interchange. The road passes over Norfolk Southern's Reading Line. The route has ramps to the dual-access Allentown Service Plaza in Upper Macungie Township, and, just north of it, I-476 reaches an interchange with US 22 (Lehigh Valley Thruway) west of Allentown, which offers an indirect connection to I-78 and PA 309.

North of Allentown, the route crosses under Norfolk Southern's Catasauqua and Fogelsville Railroad line and runs through farmland with some development. The road passes under Blue Mountain in the Lehigh Tunnel and enters Carbon County in the Pocono Mountains region. Here, I-476 crosses over the Lehigh River and Norfolk Southern's Lehigh Line before it has an interchange with US 209 east of Lehighton. Continuing through mountainous areas, the route has ramps to the dual-access Hickory Run Service Plaza prior to coming to a diamond interchange with PA 903 in Penn Forest Township. Past here, I-476 cuts through Hickory Run State Park before reaching an interchange with PA 940 providing a connection to I-80 just to the north of the state park in Kidder Township.

The route continues through mountainous terrain, heading into Luzerne County at a crossing of the Lehigh River and coming to an interchange with PA 115 in Bear Creek that provides access to nearby Wilkes-Barre. The route comes to a toll gantry near Pittston at the former location of the Wyoming Valley Toll Plaza, which marked the northern end of the ticket system on the Northeast Extension prior to the implementation of open road tolling.

A short distance later, an interchange with PA 315 provides indirect access to I-81 and Scranton. Past this interchange, I-476 crosses under a Luzerne and Susquehanna Railway line before it enters Lackawanna County. Here, the route has a bridge over a Luzerne and Susquehanna Railway line and heads through built-up areas of the Wyoming Valley as it skirts around the east side of Wilkes-Barre/Scranton International Airport, passing under I-81 before coming to a bridge over Norfolk Southern's Sunbury Line, the Lackawanna River, and a Reading Blue Mountain and Northern Railroad line. I-476 reaches a toll gantry at the former location of an all-electronic toll plaza, and has an exit to Keyser Avenue in Taylor.

North of Scranton in Clarks Summit, the route crosses a valley on the 1,630-foot-long (500 m), 163-foot-high (50 m) John E. Fitzgerald Memorial Bridge, passing over Norfolk Southern's Sunbury Line, US 6/US 11, and PA 407. Past the bridge, I-476 comes to a hairpin curve and ends at a trumpet interchange with connections to I-81, US 6, and US 11. US 6 joins the turnpike for less than 0.25 miles (0.40 km) to connect between I-81 and US 11. As this is beyond the Clarks Summit Interchange, no toll is collected on this short segment.

== Tolls ==
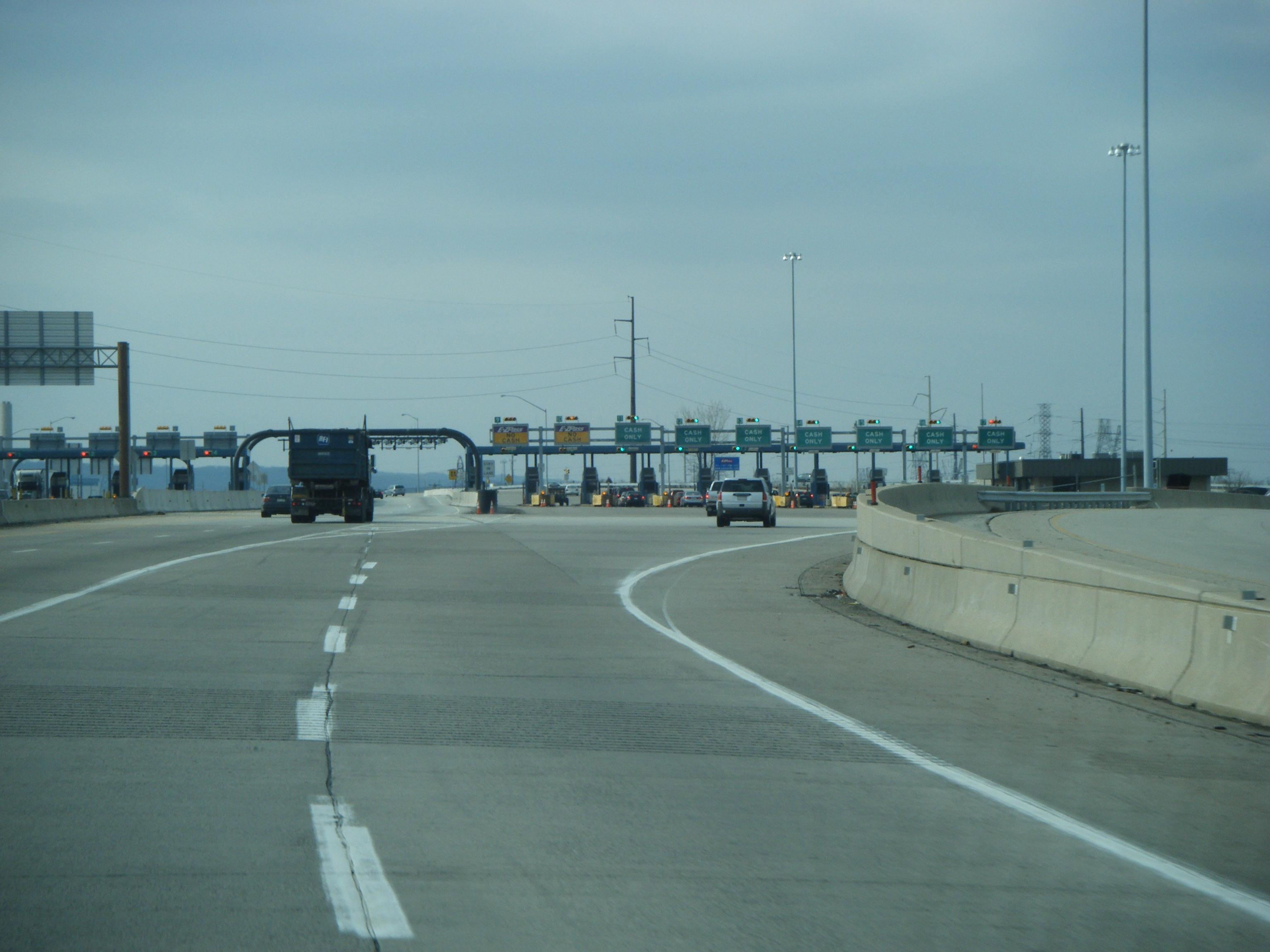
The Mid-County Toll Plaza, which marked the southern terminus of the Northeast Extension prior to the implementation of open road tolling

The Northeast Extension of the Pennsylvania Turnpike uses open road tolling, with tolls payable by toll by plate, which uses automatic license plate recognition to take a photo of the vehicle's license plate and mail a bill to the vehicle owner, or E-ZPass. Tolls along the Northeast Extension are collected through overhead gantries positioned in between exits.

As of 2026, it costs a passenger vehicle $38.88 to travel the length of the Northeast Extension using toll by plate and $19.44 using E-ZPass.

== Services ==
=== Emergency assistance and information ===
The Northeast Extension formerly had a call box every mile (1.6 km) for its entire length. In September 2017, the turnpike commission began removing the call boxes due to increased mobile phone usage making the call boxes obsolete. Motorists may also dial *11 on their mobile phones. First responder services are available to all turnpike customers via the GEICO Safety Patrol program. The safety patrol program, which is free, looks for disabled motorists, debris, and accidents along the roadway and provides assistance. The patrol service is available 24 hours every day of the year. Each patrol vehicle covers a 20-to-25-mile (32 to 40 km) stretch of the turnpike. Towing services are available from authorized service garages located near the highway. Pennsylvania State Police Troop T patrols the Pennsylvania Turnpike Northeast Extension. It has headquarters in Highspire (along the mainline turnpike) and a substation along the Northeast Extension at Pocono.

The Pennsylvania Turnpike Commission (PTC) broadcasts current roadway, traffic, and weather conditions via highway advisory radio transmitters at each exit. Broadcasts are available on 1640 kHz AM and can be received approximately two miles (3.2 km) away from each exit. The 511PA travel information service provides alerts, an interactive map, weather information, and traffic cameras to motorists. There are variable-message signs located along the roadway that provide information to motorists such as accidents, construction, weather, and traffic congestion.

=== Service plazas ===
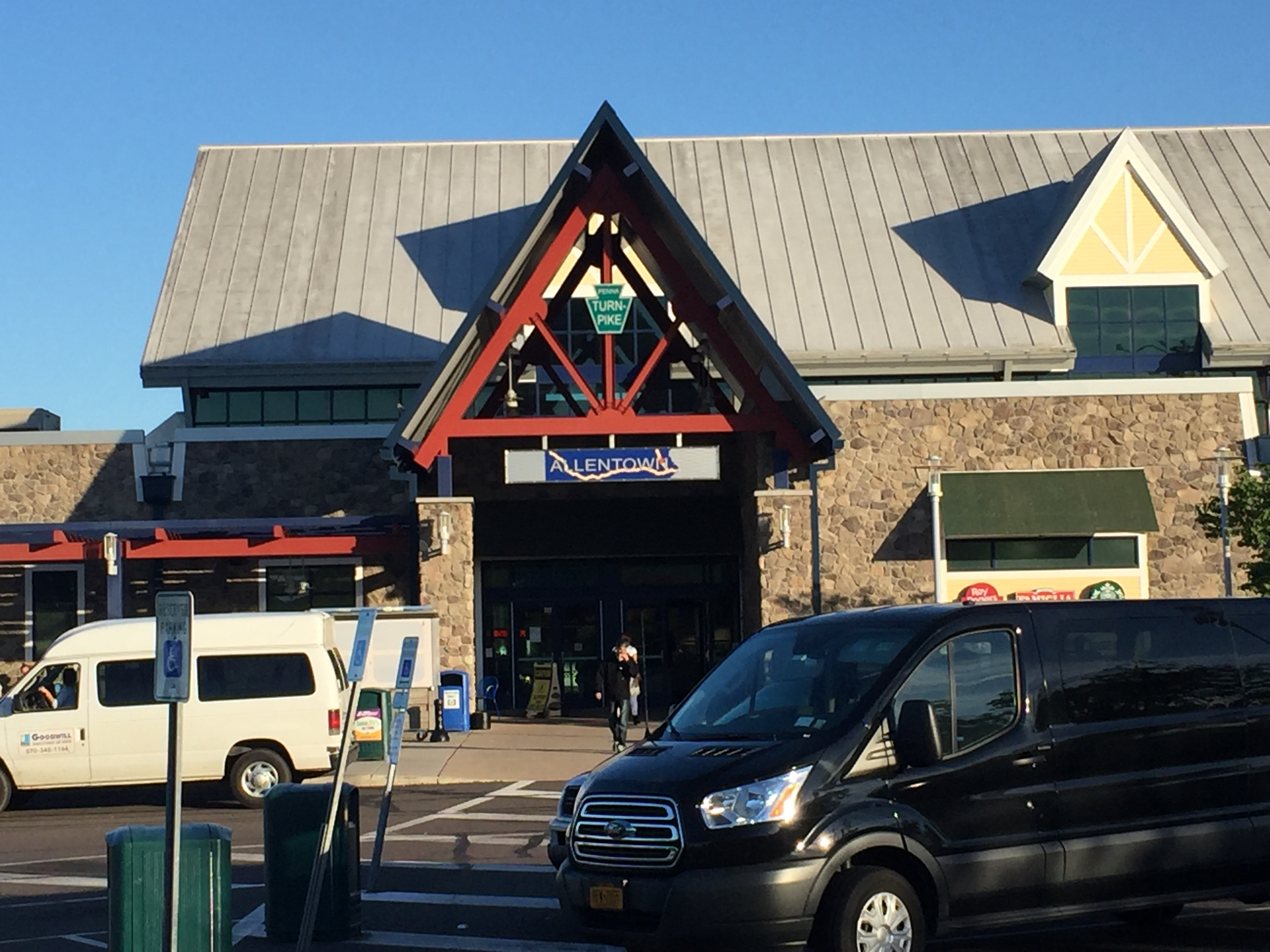
The Allentown service plaza

The Northeast Extension of the Pennsylvania Turnpike has two service plazas at Allentown and Hickory Run, which are accessible by both northbound and southbound traffic. The service plazas offer multiple fast-food restaurants, a Sunoco gas station, and a 7-Eleven convenience store. Other amenities are available such as an ATM, E-ZPass sales, free cellphone charging, Pennsylvania Lottery sales, picnic areas, restrooms, tourist information, Travel Board information centers, and Wi-Fi. The Allentown plaza contains a seasonal farmers' market. Both plazas offer conventional gasoline and diesel fuel. The Sunoco and 7-Eleven locations are operated by 7-Eleven itself while the restaurants and general upkeep of the service plazas are operated by Applegreen.

In 2006, HMSHost was awarded a contract to reconstruct the service plazas along the turnpike. The reconstruction of the service plazas, which was to cost more than $150 million (equivalent to $230 million in 2025), included a food court layout and modernized restrooms. The Allentown service plaza was rebuilt between September 2007 and May 2008 while the Hickory Run service plaza was rebuilt between January 2009 and November 2010.

The Art Sparks program was launched in 2017 as a partnership between the turnpike commission and the Pennsylvania Council on the Arts to install public art created by local students in the Arts in Education residency program in service plazas along the turnpike over the next five years. The public art consists of a mural reflecting the area where the service plaza is located.

== History ==
=== Mid-County Expressway ===
Interstate 495
- Location: Woodlyn–Plymouth Meeting
- Existed: 1956–1958

Interstate 480
- Location: Woodlyn–Plymouth Meeting
- Existed: 1958–1964

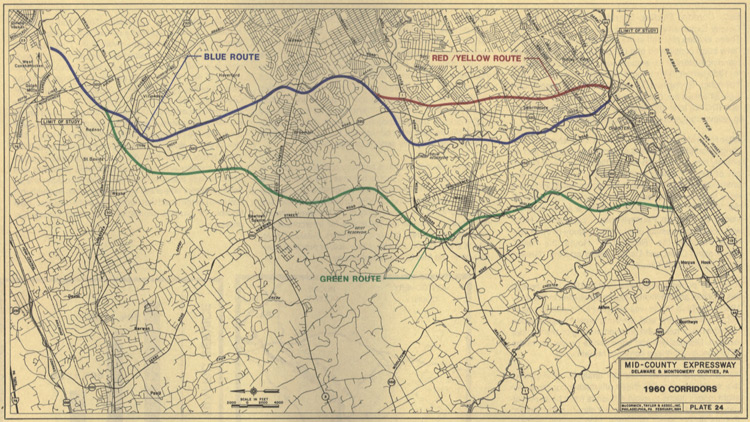
A 1960 map of central Delaware County, outlining the proposed corridors of the Mid-County Expressway

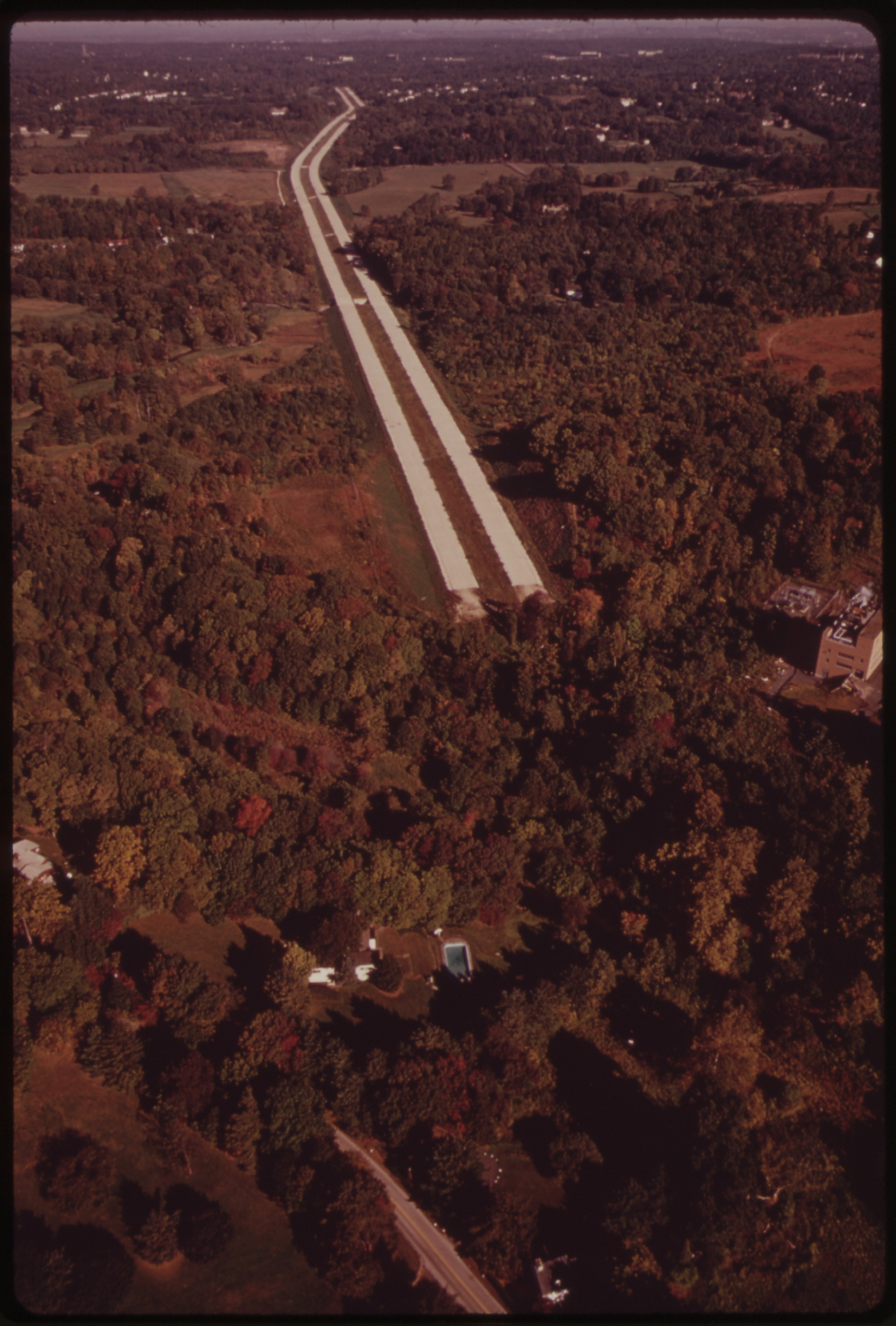
A stretch of the Mid-County Expressway near the now-closed Haverford State Hospital in the early 1970s; the stretch was completed in the early 1990s.

Originally planned as far back as 1929, the Mid-County Expressway was later proposed by the Pennsylvania Turnpike Commission as the "Chester Extension" of the Pennsylvania Turnpike in 1954. After the advent of the Interstate Highway System, the project was transferred to the Pennsylvania Department of Highways to be built as part of the system, designating it first as Interstate 495 (I-495) and later as Interstate 480 (I-480), as I-76 was designated as I-80S at the time. The present-day I-476 designation was assigned on February 6, 1964, when I-80S was renumbered as I-76.

The road received its nickname from a 1958 location report indicating various proposed geographic configurations of an expressway through Delaware County with lines of various colors on a map. The "blue route" through the Crum Creek valley won out over other contenders, which included a more easterly "red route" and "yellow route" and a more westerly "green route".

As one of the most controversial Interstate Highways in Pennsylvania, construction of I-476 began in 1967 but would take decades to build due to litigation between the Pennsylvania Department of Transportation (PennDOT) and several communities in the road's path over environmental concerns. Two sections of the road in Radnor Township and in Lower Merion Township were built in 1970 but remained closed to traffic as they did not connect to any other roads. The section of I-476 between I-76 and Chemical Road opened to traffic in 1979 while the section between I-95 and MacDade Boulevard opened to traffic in August 1988. The road opened between Chemical Road and Plymouth Road in August 1991 while the final section of I-476 between MacDade Boulevard and I-76 was opened in December 1991.

An agreement in 1985 led to many environmental compromises in the road's design, including a downsized four-lane design south of PA 3 (although a part of the span between exits 9 and 5 has a third truck lane on the southbound side), ramp meters, and scenic route status, prohibiting the erection of advertisement billboards along the entire freeway portion. The Radnor Gateway Enhancement Strategy was implemented to install large scale sculpture elements by artist William P. Reimann, most notably the stone griffin and cairn at exit 13. While the redesigned highway was largely well-received, the constriction to four lanes has led to bottleneck conditions in the area, and many communities that originally opposed the road have now called for its widening. The Philadelphia Inquirer dubbed I-476 "the most costly, most bitterly opposed highway in Pennsylvania history" due to the decades of opposition it garnered. On December 15, 1992, the final portion of the road was opened.

In the 2000s, the road underwent a rehabilitation project, including paving, bridge repair, and ramp maintenance of the entire length of the freeway between I-95 and the Pennsylvania Turnpike. The section between I-95 and PA 3 was repaved in 2005 while the section between PA 3 and I-76 was repaved in 2007. The section between I-76 and I-276, which was completely reconstructed, was finished in the end of 2011.

PennDOT has plans to improve I-476 to reduce traffic congestion. Smart technology will be added to detect traffic congestion. The first phase will add variable speed limits that can change based on weather and congestion, new ramp meters, and electronic signs. The left shoulders of the roadway between I-95 and PA 3 will be widened and used as a third travel lane during peak traffic periods. Construction on the smart technology is underway while construction of the third lane is expected to begin in 2026. This improvement project is planned to be completed in 2030.

=== Pennsylvania Turnpike Northeast Extension ===
In 1953, an extension of the Pennsylvania Turnpike from the mainline near Plymouth Meeting north through Northeastern Pennsylvania to the New York state line near Binghamton, New York, was proposed. Groundbreaking for the Northeastern Extension occurred on March 25, 1954, in White Haven, with Governor John S. Fine and commission chair Thomas J. Evans present. The Northeast Extension was planned to run from the mainline Pennsylvania Turnpike in Plymouth Meeting north to a temporary terminus at Scranton. In April 1954, $233 million (equivalent to $2.21 billion in 2025) in bonds were issued to build the Northeastern Extension along with the Delaware River–Turnpike Toll Bridge on the mainline Pennsylvania Turnpike. The Northeast Extension was built with a four-foot (1.2 m) median to save money. Due to the mountainous terrain it passed through, a large amount of earthwork was necessary to build the road, along with the construction of large bridges. Among the bridges built was the 1,630-foot-long (500 m) Clarks Summit Bridge (since renamed for John J. Fitzgerald, Turnpike engineer and superintendent) over US 6/US 11, which at the time was the tallest bridge on the Pennsylvania Turnpike system at 135 feet (41 m). The Northeast Extension also included the two-lane Lehigh Tunnel under Blue Mountain. The tunnel was originally going to be named for commission chair Evans but was changed when he was convicted of conspiracy to defraud the commission of $19 million (equivalent to $140 million in 2025). The road was opened between the Plymouth Meeting Interchange and the Lehigh Valley Interchange on November 23, 1955. The highway was extended north to a temporary interchange at Emerald on December 28 of that year. The Northeast Extension was opened between Emerald and Wyoming Valley on April 1, 1957. The entire length of the Northeast Extension was finished on November 7, 1957, with the completion of the northernmost part between Wyoming Valley and Scranton. The part of the Northeast Extension between Scranton and the New York state line was not built as part of the Pennsylvania Turnpike system but rather the Interstate Highway System as I-81. At the northern terminus, the Northeast Extension narrowed to two lanes along the northbound offramp at Scranton to come to its northern terminus, with an abandoned short spur of the mainline heading north. A pair of trumpet interchanges were built to connect the Northeast Extension and I-81.

On April 14, 1969, a project that replaced the old median with a jersey barrier was completed.

Pennsylvania Route 9
- Location: Plymouth Meeting–South Abington Township
- Length: 111.04 mi (178.70 km)
- Existed: 1974–1996

In 1974, the roadway was designated PA 9.

The tickets along the Northeast Extension of the Pennsylvania Turnpike were originally handed out by hand. In 1987, machines replaced humans in distributing them.

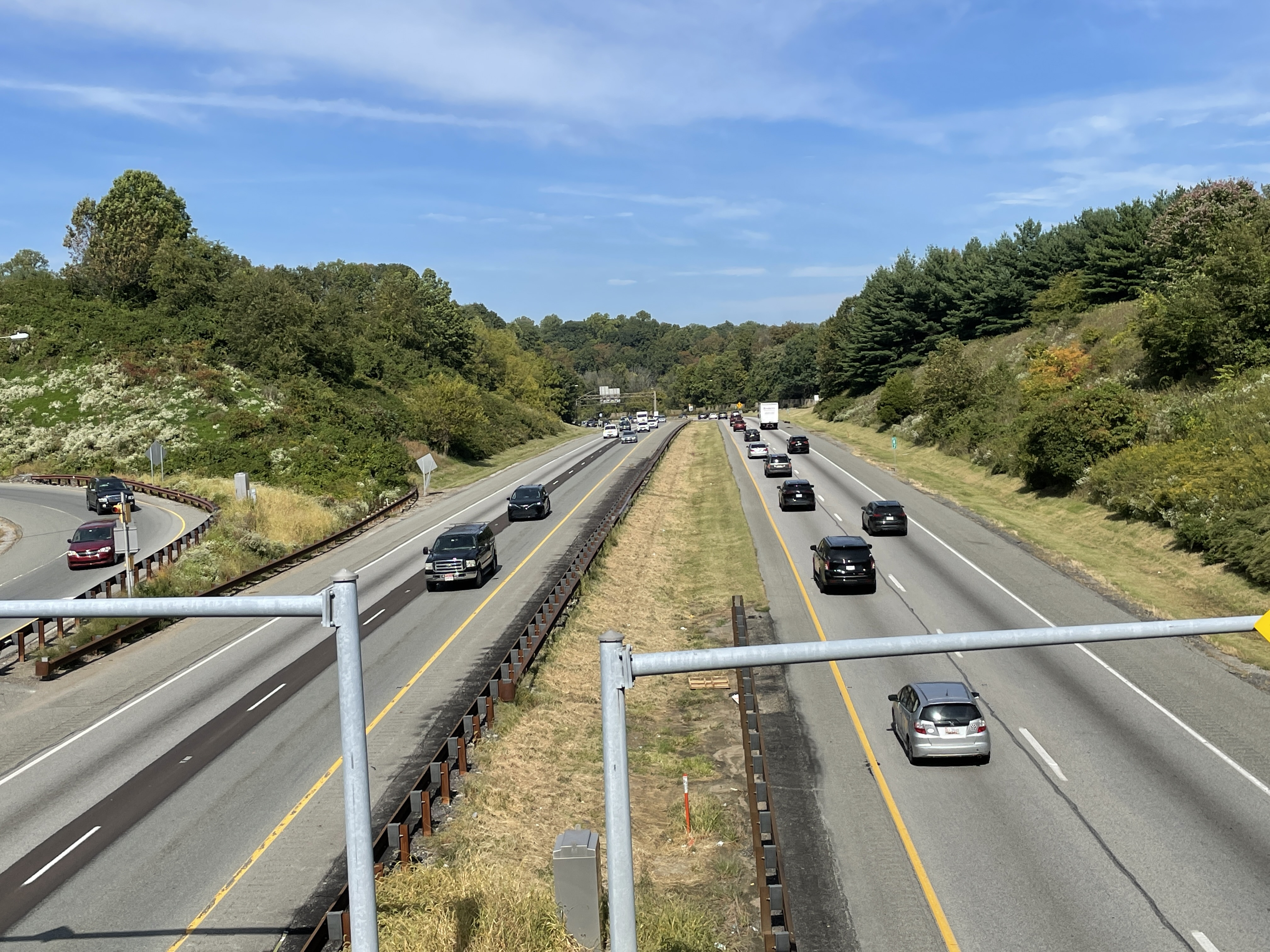
I-476 northbound at PA 3 in Broomall

Plans to build both the Mid-County Interchange and Toll Plaza were made; the latter would connect to I-476 (Mid-County Expressway), and the former to the mainline. The PTC approved a contract to build the interchange in March 1989. The new interchange would replace the untolled interchange, which had served as the southern terminus of the Northeast Extension, which would instead be at the new plaza. That June, a losing bidder decided to challenge the turnpike commission, saying it violated female and minority contracting rules regarding the percentage of these employees that were used for the project. Under this rule, bidders were supposed to have at least 12 percent of contracts to minority-owned companies and at least four percent to female-owned companies. The losing bidder had 12.4 percent of the contracts to minority companies and 4.2 percent to female-owned companies, while the winning bidder had 6.1 percent and 3.7 percent, respectively. The turnpike commission decided to rebid the contract, but was sued by the original contractor. This dispute delayed the construction of the interchange. The contract was rebid in November 1989 after the Supreme Court of Pennsylvania permitted it. The interchange between I-476 and the turnpike mainline was completed in November 1992; the ramps to the Northeast Extension opened a month later. An official ribbon-cutting took place on December 15, 1992.

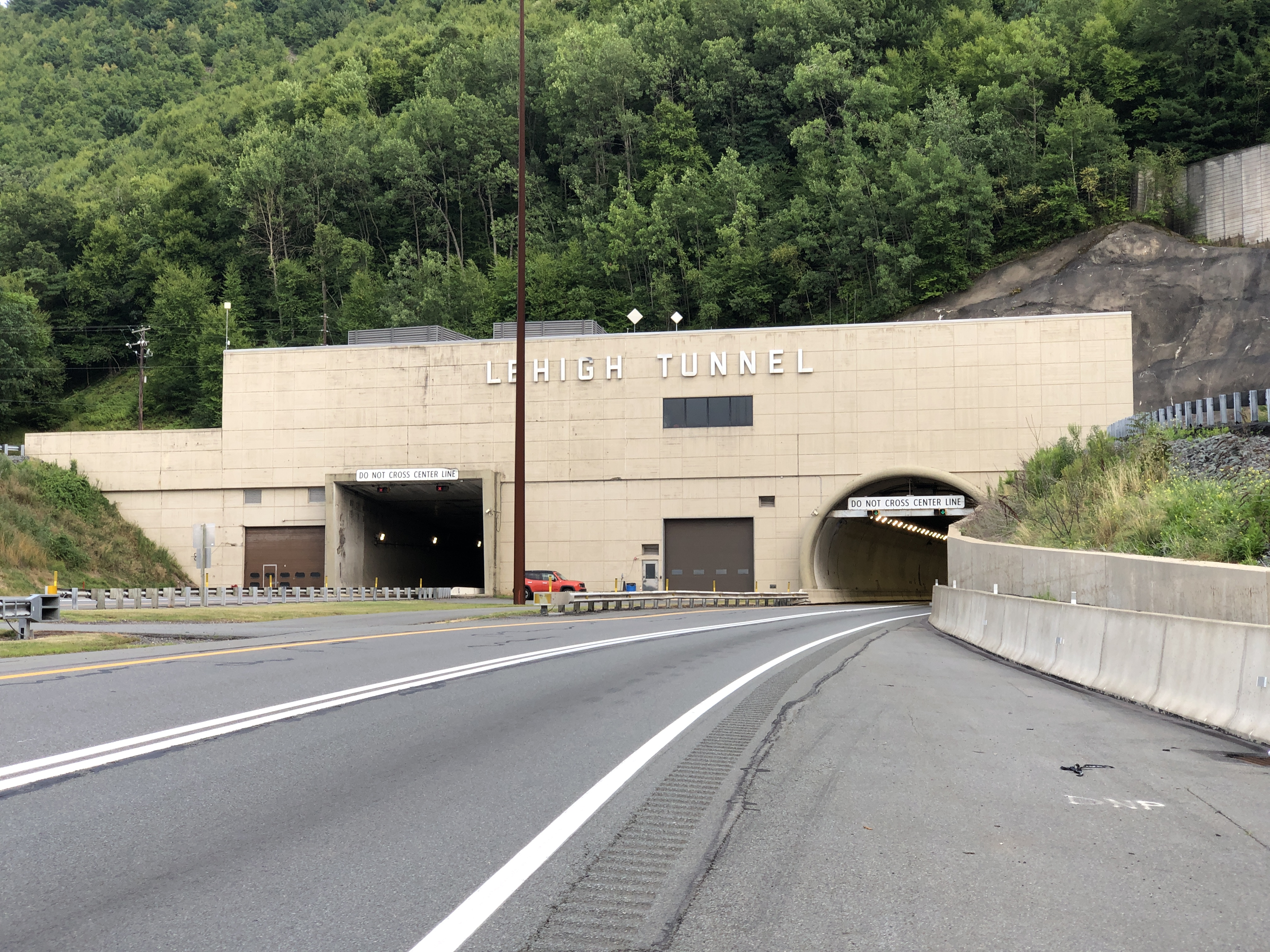
Lehigh Tunnel southbound

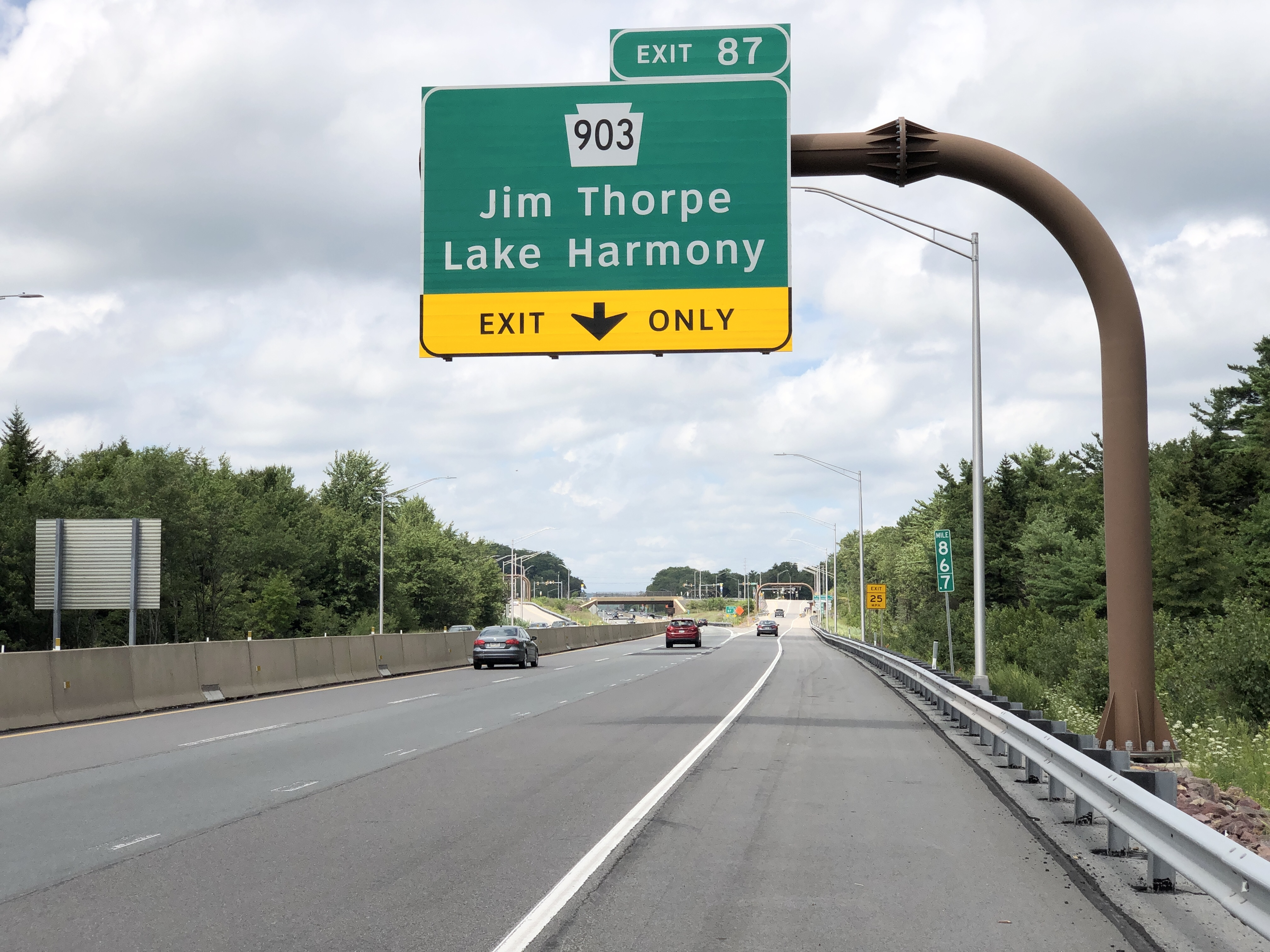
I-476 northbound at the exit for PA 903 in Penn Forest Township

When it first opened, traffic on the Northeast Extension was light. By the 1970s, traffic along the roadway increased with the completion of the connecting I-80 and the rising popularity of the Pocono Mountains as a vacation destination. As a result, the two-lane Lehigh Tunnel faced serious congestion. Plans were made to either bypass the tunnel or add a second tube. The turnpike commission decided it would build a second tunnel, as the cost was lower than building a bypass. In 1988, a $37-million (equivalent to $86.8 million in 2025) contract was awarded to build the second tube. Groundbreaking for the tunnel took place on February 14, 1989, with Governor Robert P. Casey in attendance. Excavation of the new tunnel began in July of that year. Construction of the second tube utilized the New Austrian tunneling method, which reduced the cost of the tunnel by $5 million to $6 million (equivalent to $11.7 million to $14.1 million in 2025). It was the first tunnel in the US to use this construction method. The second tube at Lehigh Tunnel opened on November 22, 1991, with Governor Casey in attendance, leading a line of antique cars. Construction of the tunnel cost $45 million (equivalent to $94.7 million in 2025). The new tube is used for southbound traffic while the original tube carries northbound traffic. The newer tunnel is wider, higher, and brighter than the original.

On March 19, 1991, work began on a project to build the Wyoming Valley Toll Barrier on the Northeast Extension. The plaza became the new northern end of the ticket system, while the Clarks Summit Toll Plaza was converted into a coin drop plaza, and the Scranton Interchange was renamed the Wyoming Valley Interchange and renumbered exit 39 from exit 38. This was to allow for the construction of a new interchange with Keyser Avenue to take advantage of the new tolling structure, which began in February 1992. The Wyoming Valley Toll Barrier was completed on November 27, 1992, when the section reopened. Later in December, coin drop machines were installed at the Clarks Summit Plaza, toll collectors had temporarily been assigned that job. On February 1, 1995, work was completed on the Keyser Avenue Interchange and Keyser Avenue Toll Barrier. The entire project had costed $22.4 million (equivalent to $43.2 million in 2025).

On November 1, 1996, the Northeast Extension was added to the Interstate Highway System as a northern extension of I-476, replacing the PA 9 designation along the road. The new guardrails and line striping were necessary for the toll road to become an Interstate. It was hoped that the Interstate designation would bring economic development and tourism to the areas served by the roadway. This extension resulted in I-476 surpassing the 120-mile (190 km) I-495 in Massachusetts as the longest auxiliary Interstate Highway.

In January 1997, the PTC completed the expansion of the Lansdale Interchange’s toll plaza from five lanes to ten lanes. This project included the addition of a parking lot and the rebuilding of ramps. In Fall of that year, the PTC completed an expansion of the Quakertown Interchange’s toll plaza, as well as the addition of a parking lot and rebuilt ramps.

In 1990, an electronic toll collection system was proposed for the Pennsylvania Turnpike, in which a motorist would create an account and use an electronic device that would be read by an electronic tollbooth. The motorist would be billed later. The multi-state electronic tolling system, which was to be called E-ZPass, was planned to be implemented by 1998. The planned installation date was later pushed back to 2000. On December 2, 2000, E-ZPass debuted along the Northeast Extension of the Pennsylvania Turnpike between the Mid-County Toll Plaza and Lehigh Valley Interchange. On December 15, 2001, E-ZPass support was extended from the Leigh Valley Interchange to the Wyoming Valley Toll Plaza. Commercial vehicles were allowed to start using E-ZPass on December 14, 2002. On November 23, 2004, support was extended from the Wyoming Valley Toll Plaza to the Clarks Summit Toll Plaza.

On November 24, 2004, the day before Thanksgiving, 2,000 Teamsters Union employees went on strike, after contract negotiations failed. This was the first strike in the history of the roadway. As this is usually one of the busiest traffic days in the US, to avoid traffic jams, tolls were waived for the rest of the day. Starting on November 25, turnpike management personnel collected flat-rate passenger tolls of $2 and commercial tolls of $15 from cash customers on the ticketed system, while E-ZPass customers were charged the lesser of the actual toll or the same flat rates. The strike ended after seven days when both sides reached an agreement on November 30, 2004. Normal toll collection resumed on December 1, 2004.

In October 2005, the PTC, in conjunction with PennDOT, completed the addition of four 55 mph (89 km/h) express E-ZPass lanes at the Mid-County Toll Plaza, marking the second of them to be added on a PTC owned road.

In November 2006, Governor Ed Rendell and former Pennsylvania House Speaker John Perzel suggested leasing the extension long-term to a private group to raise money to improve other infrastructure in the state. Such a lease was speculated to raise up to $30 billion (equivalent to $46 billion in 2025) for the state. In October 2007, 34 companies submitted 14 proposals to lease the turnpike. On May 19, 2008, a $12.8-billion (equivalent to $19.1 billion in 2025) proposal by Abertis, a Spain-based firm, and Citigroup in New York City to lease the turnpike was submitted. The consortium withdrew the offer on September 30 of that year because it thought the proposal would not be approved by the state legislature.

On May 29, 2011, the bridge on the Northeast Extension over US 6 and US 11 was renamed the John E. Fitzgerald Memorial Bridge. He helped build the structure, and was a 13-year-long member of the PTC.

On December 22, 2008, work began on a replacement of the Bridge carrying the Northeast Extension over the Pocono Creek. Two new bridges with shoulders were built, and the old structures, a girder bridge and a deck truss bridge, were demolished. This $101.6 million project was completed on November 4, 2011.

In 1990, plans were made to build an interchange at PA 903 in Carbon County. A bill authorizing the construction of this interchange was signed into law by Governor Casey in July of that year. Plans for this interchange were cancelled by the turnpike commission in 1995. In 2006, plans for an interchange at PA 903 were resurrected, with the proposed interchange to be all-electronic, in that it would only accept E-ZPass. Construction on the $23-million (equivalent to $33.7 million in 2025) interchange began in the middle of 2008. The interchange opened to traffic on June 30, 2015.

In October 2016, the turnpike began accepting credit cards as payment at all the toll booths.

The turnpike used traffic lights as feedback signals for E-ZPass users since it was launched in 2001. On March 17, 2017, the PTC announced that it would begin removing the feedback signals as part of upgrading toll equipment because they do not conform to federal signage guidelines.

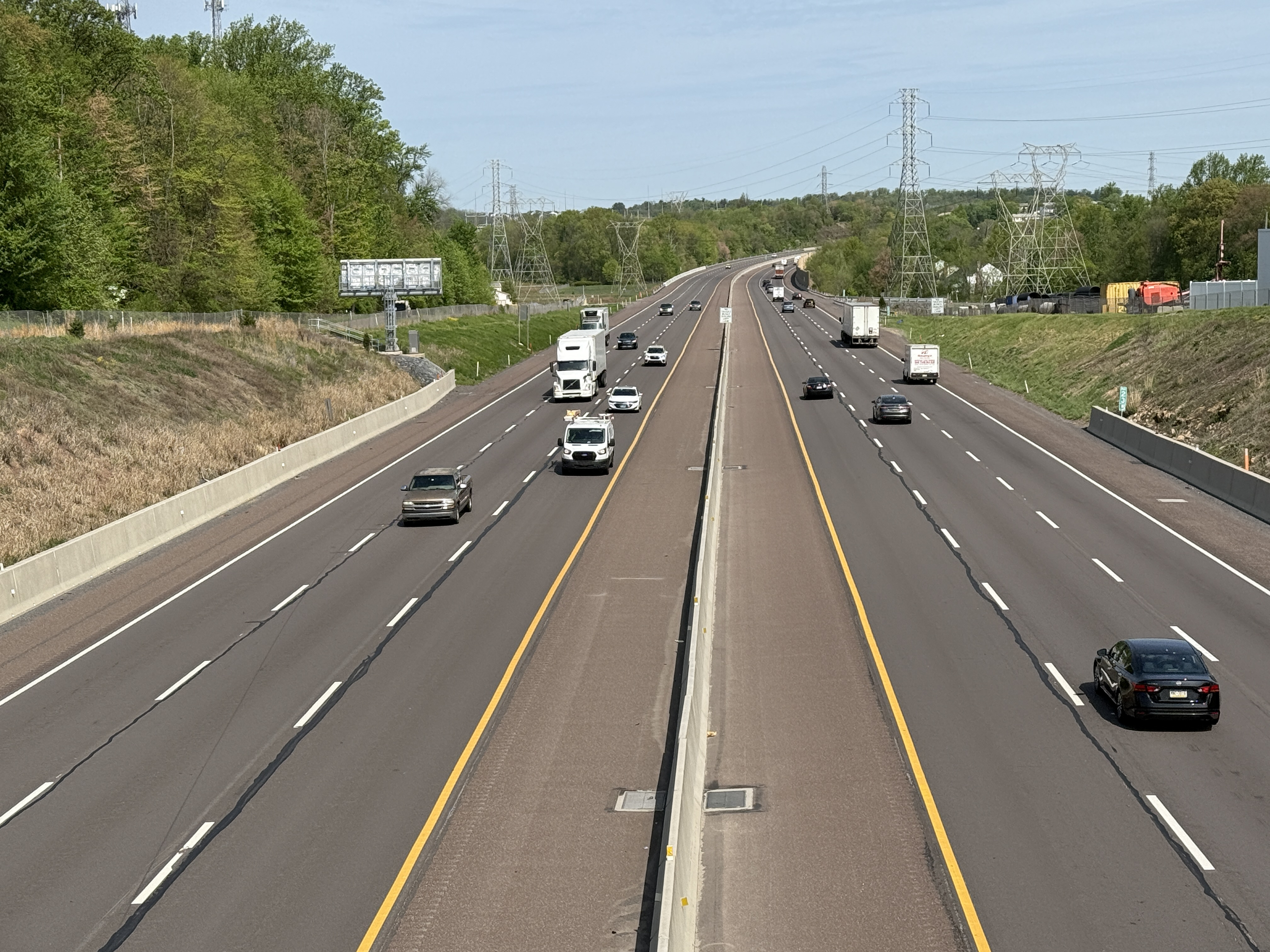
I-476 North in Whitpain Township

In 2007, the turnpike commission announced plans to widen the Northeast Extension to six lanes between Mid-County and Lansdale. The project divided this stretch of highway into two sections. Work on the southern section began in January 2008 with the replacement of two bridges over the Northeast Extension to accommodate the widened highway. Construction on the actual widening phase commenced in January 2011. Completion was originally planned in 2013; however, construction fell a year behind schedule. Construction on widening the northern section started in May 2014, while work on widening the southern section finished in October of that year. By this point, the project scope was expanded to include the Lansdale Interchange itself, the roadway to a point one mile (1.6 km) north of the interchange, and two new E-ZPass-only ramps to relieve congestion at the toll plaza. This new northbound exit ramp opened on December 4, 2016, and the companion southbound on-ramp opened a week later. Construction along the northern section was originally planned to finish by the end of 2016 but was delayed until mid-2017. Construction was substantially completed, with all six lanes open, by August 31, 2017.

On February 21, 2018, Howard M. Sexton, a 70-year-old truck driver from New Jersey, was killed in the southbound Lehigh Tunnel when an electrical conduit broke free from the tunnel's ceiling and fell through the windshield of his truck, striking him in the head. In a preliminary report issued on May 1, 2018, the National Transportation Safety Board revealed that a 10-foot-long (3.0 m) section of conduit fell into the path of Sexton's truck after the steel support system for the conduits, which were suspended from the apex of the tunnel arch directly over the travel lanes, failed. The tunnel had last been inspected in 2016, at which time an inspector found evidence of corrosion on several of the steel support straps.

In 2019, the turnpike launched a smartphone app for paying tolls.

Once widening was completed from Mid-County to Lansdale, a similar project began on the next segment of highway, from Lansdale to Quakertown. As done on the first project, the Lansdale–Quakertown segment was rebuilt in two sections, with a southern half started in late 2017, widening the road to six lanes with full shoulders. Advance work began in early 2013 with the replacement of several bridges in this area north of Lansdale, with work on the actual widening beginning in late 2017. Widening of this section was completed in late 2020. In April 2022, construction began on widening the northern section of the roadway between Lansdale and Quakertown, with completion expected in early 2025.

Until March 2020, the Northeast Extension used the ticket system method of tolling between the Mid-County and Wyoming Valley toll plazas along with the mainline Pennsylvania Turnpike between Warrendale and Neshaminy Falls. With the ticket system, a motorist received a ticket upon entering the turnpike at an interchange and paid the fare and surrendered the ticket upon exiting. If a motorist lost the ticket, the turnpike charged the highest fare to the exit where the motorist left. Cash, credit cards, and E-ZPass were accepted at traditional toll plazas. On April 29, 2018, all-electronic tolling was implemented at the Keyser Avenue and Clarks Summit toll plazas. All-electronic tolling was originally scheduled to be implemented on the entire length of the Northeast Extension in the later part of 2021, however, as a result of the COVID-19 pandemic, the switch was made early in March 2020. All-electronic tolling on the turnpike initially utilized existing toll booths at exits, along with existing equipment at all-electronic tolling interchanges, until mainline toll gantries between interchanges were constructed. The toll gantries on the Northeast Extension and the mainline turnpike east of Reading began operation in January 2025, and the toll plazas at interchanges were subsequently demolished.

In late 2021, construction began to replace the functionally obsolete Hawk Falls Bridge that carries I-476 over Mud Run in Carbon County. The replacement bridge will be a 720 feet (220 m) long steel bridge that will include shoulders. Construction of the replacement bridge is expected to be completed in the middle part of 2026.

The turnpike commission has stated its intention of continuing the widening effort from the Quakertown Interchange all the way north to the Lehigh Valley Interchange at milepost 56, although it will take until the late 2020s to get done.

On April 28, 2016, plans were announced for a "Scranton Beltway" to use I-476 as a bypass for I-81 around the heavily congested segment through Scranton and its suburbs. The turnpike between the two I-81 interchanges carries an average of 10,000 vehicles per day vs. 70,000 on the parallel segment of I-81. This project will build two high-speed connections between I-476 and I-81: one south of Scranton in Dupont and one north of Scranton in South Abington Township. Tolls on the connections will be paid with E-ZPass or toll by plate. Construction of this project is expected to cost $160 million. In 2021, design work on the project resumed, with construction expected to begin in 2025.

== Exit list ==
The old exit numbers (31 and upward) on the Northeast Extension were a continuation of old exit numbers 1 through 30 on the mainline turnpike. On the mainline turnpike, the interchange with I-476 was old exit 25A because it was between old exits 25 and 26 on that roadway.

County	Location	mi	km	Old exit	New exit	Name	Destinations	Notes
Delaware	Ridley Township	0.00	0.00	–	–		I-95 – Philadelphia, Chester	Southern terminus; exit 7 on I-95; access to Philadelphia International Airport
Delaware	Ridley Township	0.48	0.77	1	1		MacDade Boulevard	Access to Widener University
Delaware	Nether Providence Township	3.39	5.46	2	3		Media, Swarthmore	Access via Baltimore Pike; access to Springfield
Delaware	Marple Township	5.07	8.16	3	5		US 1 – Lima, Springfield	
Delaware	Marple Township	8.77	14.11	4	9		PA 3 – Broomall, Upper Darby	Access to Newtown Square and Havertown
Delaware	Radnor Township	13.24	21.31	5	13		US 30 – St. Davids, Villanova	Access to Haverford College and Bryn Mawr College
Montgomery	Lower Merion Township–West Conshohocken line	15.84	25.49	6	16		I-76 to PA 23 – Philadelphia, Valley Forge, Conshohocken	PA 23/Conshohocken not signed southbound; signed as exits 16A (east) and 16B (west) northbound; access to PA 23 via Matsonford Road; exits 331A-B on I-76
Montgomery	Plymouth Township	18.81	30.27	7	18		Conshohocken, Norristown	Conshohocken not signed southbound; signed as exits 18A (Conshohocken) and 18B (Norristown) northbound; access via Ridge Pike/Chemical Road
Montgomery	Plymouth Township	19.69	31.69	8	19		Plymouth Meeting	Northbound exit and southbound entrance; access via Chemical Road
Montgomery	Plymouth Township	19.97	32.14	9	20A		To I-276 Toll west / Penna Turnpike west Plymouth Road	Northbound exit and southbound entrance; access to I-276 / Penna Turnpike via Germantown Pike; exit 333 on I-276 / Penna Turnpike; last northbound exit before toll
Montgomery	Plymouth Township	19.97	32.14	Penna Turnpike NE Extension begins				
Montgomery	Plymouth Township	20.33	32.72	25A	20	Mid-County	I-276 Toll – Harrisburg, New Jersey	No northbound access to I-276 west/Harrisburg; signed as exits 20A (west) and 20B (east) southbound
Montgomery	Upper Gwynedd Township	27	43	Toll Gantry (E-ZPass or toll-by-plate)				
Montgomery	Towamencin Township	30.78	49.54	31	31	Lansdale	PA 63 – Kulpsville, Harleysville	Signed as exits 31A (east) and 31B (west) northbound
Montgomery	Towamencin Township	31	50	Toll Gantry (E-ZPass or toll-by-plate)				
Bucks	Milford Township	44.39	71.44	32	44	Quakertown	PA 663 – Quakertown, Pottstown	
Bucks	Milford Township	45	72	Toll Gantry (E-ZPass or toll-by-plate)				
Lehigh	Upper Macungie Township	56.37	90.72	Allentown Service Plaza				
Lehigh	South Whitehall Township	57.71	92.88	33	56	Lehigh Valley	I-78 / US 22 / PA 309 – Allentown, Harrisburg	Access to I-78 and PA 309 via US 22
Lehigh	Washington Township	70	110	Toll Gantry (E-ZPass or toll-by-plate)				
Blue Mountain		71.68	115.36	Lehigh Tunnel				
Carbon	Franklin Township	75.73	121.88	34	74	Mahoning Valley	US 209 – Lehighton, Stroudsburg	Access to Jim Thorpe
Carbon	Franklin Township	77	124	Toll Gantry (E-ZPass or toll-by-plate)				
Carbon	Penn Forest Township	86.62	139.40	Hickory Run Service Plaza				
Carbon	Penn Forest Township	87.39	140.64	–	87	Route 903	PA 903 – Jim Thorpe, Lake Harmony	Access to Long Pond; interchange name not signed
Carbon	Penn Forest Township	88	142	Toll Gantry (E-ZPass or toll-by-plate)				
Carbon	Kidder Township	94.82	152.60	35	95	Pocono	I-80 / PA 940 – Hazleton, Mount Pocono	Exit 277 on I-80
Luzerne	Penn Lake Park	99	159	Toll Gantry (E-ZPass or toll-by-plate)				
Luzerne	Bear Creek Township	105.85	170.35	36	105	Wilkes-Barre	PA 115 – Wilkes-Barre, Bear Creek	
Luzerne	Jenkins Township	113	182	Toll Gantry (E-ZPass or toll-by-plate)				
Luzerne	Pittston Township	115.17	185.35	37	115	Wyoming Valley	PA 315 to I-81 – Wilkes-Barre, Scranton, Pittston	Signed for Scranton northbound, Pittston southbound; formerly known as the Scranton Interchange
Lackawanna	Taylor	121	195	Toll Gantry (E-ZPass or toll-by-plate)				
Lackawanna	Taylor	122.36	196.92	38	122	Keyser Avenue	Old Forge, Taylor	Access via Keyser Avenue
Lackawanna	South Abington Township	123	198	Toll Gantry (E-ZPass or toll-by-plate)				
Lackawanna	South Abington Township	131.37	211.42	39	131	Clarks Summit	I-81 / US 6 east – Binghamton, Wilkes-Barre US 6 west / US 11 – Scranton, Clarks Summit	Northern terminus; exit 194 on I-81; to I-84 and I-380
1.000 mi = 1.609 km; 1.000 km = 0.621 mi: Electronic toll collection; Incomplete access; Route transition

== Interstate 476 Truck ==
Interstate 476 Truck
- Location: Montgomery County
- Length: 4.6 mi (7.4 km)

Interstate 476 Truck (I-476 Truck) is a connector truck route that provides access from PA 309 and the Sellersville Bypass near Souderton to PA 63 and I-476 at the Lansdale Interchange. It follows East Township Line Road and Wambold Road through portions of central Montgomery County, Pennsylvania. In the opposite direction, the route is signed PA 309 Truck. Signs were posted in 2025.
