= Tobyhanna =

Tobyhanna may refer to the following places in Pennsylvania in the United States:

- Tobyhanna, Pennsylvania, in Coolbaugh Township, Monroe County
- Tobyhanna Army Depot, a United States Army installation in Tobyhanna Township
- Tobyhanna Creek, a tributary of the Lehigh River
- Tobyhanna State Park, in Monroe County
- Tobyhanna Township, Monroe County, Pennsylvania, in Monroe County
