= Pennsylvania Route 423 =

State highway in Pennsylvania, United States

Pennsylvania Route 423

Route information
- Maintained by PennDOT
- Length: 14.319 mi (23.044 km)
- Existed: 1965–present

Major junctions
- South end: PA 940 in Pocono Pines
- I-380 in Tobyhanna; PA 611 in Tobyhanna; PA 196 in Gouldsboro
- North end: PA 191 south of South Sterling

Location
- Country: United States
- State: Pennsylvania
- Counties: Monroe, Wayne

Highway system
- Pennsylvania State Route System; Interstate; US; State; Scenic; Legislative
← US 422	→ PA 424
← PA 488	PA 490	→ PA 491

Pennsylvania Route 423 (PA 423) is a state route in Monroe and Wayne counties in Pennsylvania. It runs for 14.32 miles (23.05 km), crossing through the Pocono Mountains from PA 940 in Pocono Pines to PA 191 in South Sterling. The route runs southwest-northeast through forested areas of the Pocono Mountains as a two-lane undivided road. In Tobyhanna, PA 423 has an interchange with Interstate 380 (I-380) and an intersection with PA 611. Farther northeast, the route crosses PA 196 in Gouldsboro. PA 490 was designated in 1928 to run from U.S. Route 611 (US 611) in Tobyhanna northeast to PA 90 (now PA 191) in Laanna. In the 1930s, the route was extended and realigned to run from PA 940 in Pocono Pines to PA 90 in South Sterling. PA 490 became PA 423 in the 1960s.

== Route description ==
PA 423 begins at an intersection with PA 940 in the community of Pocono Pines. The route heads northbound as Warnertown Road, progressing around the shores of Lake Naomi. The surroundings of the highway are primarily residential. Just after the intersection with Firehouse Road in Pocono Pines, the road turns eastward along the westernmost shore of Lake Naomi. After PA 423 leaves the shoreline, it turns northward and continues through the residential hills north of the lake. The highway passes through a small community named Lake Naomi Estates. It soon passes a local school and leaves Lake Naomi Estates. The surroundings become woodlands as PA 423 darts northwest and soon to the northeast. The two-lane highway maintains the northeast progression through forests until turning north. There it turns eastward and returns northeastward for several miles and after several changes crosses Tobyhanna Creek and enters the community of Warnertown. Just after crossing the small community, PA 423 enters an interchange with I-380.

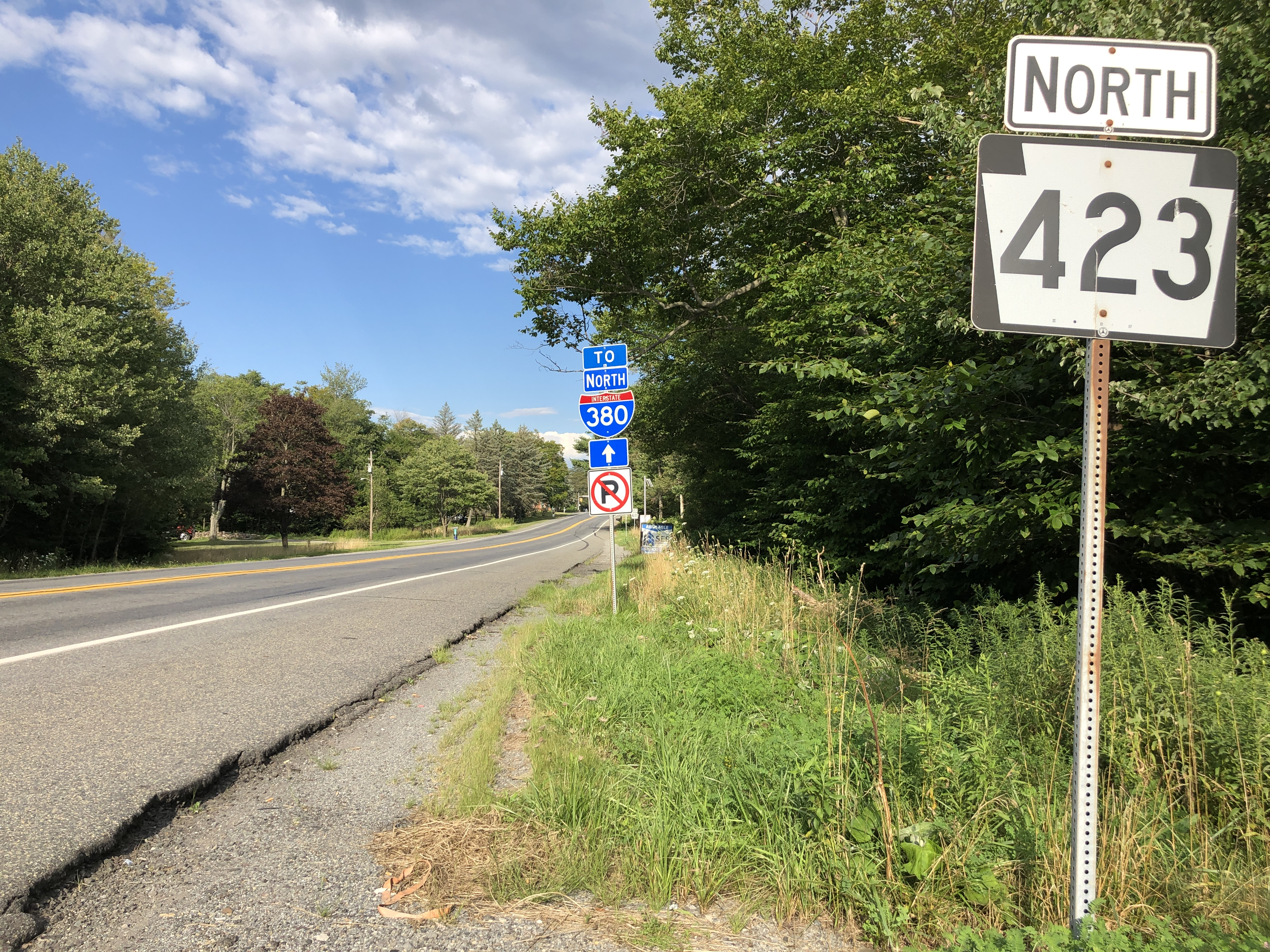
PA 423 northbound past I-380 in Coolbaugh Township

After crossing the interchange with I-380, PA 423 heads eastward and enters an at-grade intersection with PA 611 in Tobyhanna. The road is renamed to Prospect Street and enters downtown Tobyhanna, crossing through a residential stretch. At Main Street, Prospect Street ends and PA 423 turns northward onto Main Street. This does not last, as the designation darts northward on Church Street. Following Church Street out of downtown Tobyhanna, PA 423 crosses the Delaware-Lackawanna Railroad, passing the former Tobyhanna Station and interlocking tower for the switch to the Tobyhanna Army Depot. The highway continues north of the tracks and along the side of the Army Depot into a rural portion of Tobyhanna. The name changes from Church Street to Tobyhanna State Park Road, entering the namesake park near Tobyhanna Lake. PA 423 passes the dam attached at the end of the lake, where it crosses Tobyhanna Creek again, and crosses along the side of the park. After passing the state campground entrance, the highway heads eastward through a stretch of woodlands, crossing and passing two routes of power lines. After passing to the north of a large residential complex, the highway intersects with PA 196 in Gouldsboro.

After crossing PA 196, PA 423 changes names to Carlton Road and parallels PA 196 northbound along Kistler Ledge. After the two roads fork in different directions, PA 423 crosses the county line into Wayne County. The route passes a few stretches of residential homes and much woodland in Wayne County, turning to the northeast and intersecting with PA 191 in the community of South Sterling. This also serves as PA 423's northern terminus, as the right-of-way merges into PA 191.

== History ==
Pennsylvania Route 490
- Location: Pocono Pines – South Sterling
- Existed: 1928–1960s

When Pennsylvania first legislated routes in 1911, the present-day alignment of PA 423 was not given a number. In 1928, PA 490 was designated to run from US 611 (now PA 611) in Tobyhanna northeast to PA 90 (now PA 191) in Laanna. At this time, a small section northeast of Tobyhanna was paved while the remainder of the route was unpaved. In addition, the current route between Pocono Pines and Tobyhanna was an unpaved, unnumbered road. In the 1930s, PA 490 was extended southwest from Tobyhanna to PA 940 in Pocono Pines and was realigned to intersect PA 90 south of South Sterling. At this time, the entire length of the route was paved. PA 490 was renumbered to PA 423 in the 1960s.

== Major intersections ==
County	Location	mi	km	Destinations	Notes
Monroe	Tobyhanna Township	0.000	0.000	PA 940 – Mount Pocono, Blakeslee	Southern terminus
Monroe	Coolbaugh Township	6.602	10.625	I-380 south – Stroudsburg, Hazleton	Access to I-380 southbound and from I-380 northbound; exit 8 (I-380)
Monroe	Coolbaugh Township	6.976	11.227	PA 611 to I-380 north – Scranton, Mount Pocono	
Monroe	Coolbaugh Township	11.868	19.100	PA 196 north (Sterling Road) – Hamlin	South end of PA 196 overlap
Monroe	Coolbaugh Township	11.876	19.113	PA 196 south (Sterling Road) – Mount Pocono	North end of PA 196 overlap
Wayne	Dreher Township	14.319	23.044	PA 191 (South Sterling Road) – Newfoundland, Cresco	Northern terminus
1.000 mi = 1.609 km; 1.000 km = 0.621 mi: Concurrency terminus; Incomplete access

== PA 423 Truck ==
Pennsylvania Route 423 Truck
- Location: Tobyhanna Township
- Length: 8.9 mi (14.3 km)

Pennsylvania Route 423 Truck is a truck route bypassing a segment of PA 423 on which trucks with trailers over 45 feet in length are prohibited. This segment also features a weight-restricted bridge over Kistler Run. The route follows PA 940 and I-380 throughout Monroe County, Pennsylvania. Unlike many other truck routes throughout the state that were established in 2013, PA 423 Truck was signed in 2019 after the weight-restricted bridge on PA 940 had been repaired. As of March 2021, the bridge has no weight-restrictions over it, and construction on repairing the bridge was started around that same time. Because the truck restriction is still in place on mainline PA 423, the route is still signed.
