= Pocono Mountain High School =

Pocono Mountain High School may refer to:

- Pocono Mountain East High School, in Pocono Mountain School District, at Pocono Mountain School Road, Swiftwater, Pennsylvania, which prior to 2002 was known as Pocono Mountain High School
- Pocono Mountain West High School, at Panther Lane, Pocono Summit, Pennsylvania, built to accommodate expansion
