= Gouldsboro State Park =

State park in Monroe and Wayne counties, Pennsylvania

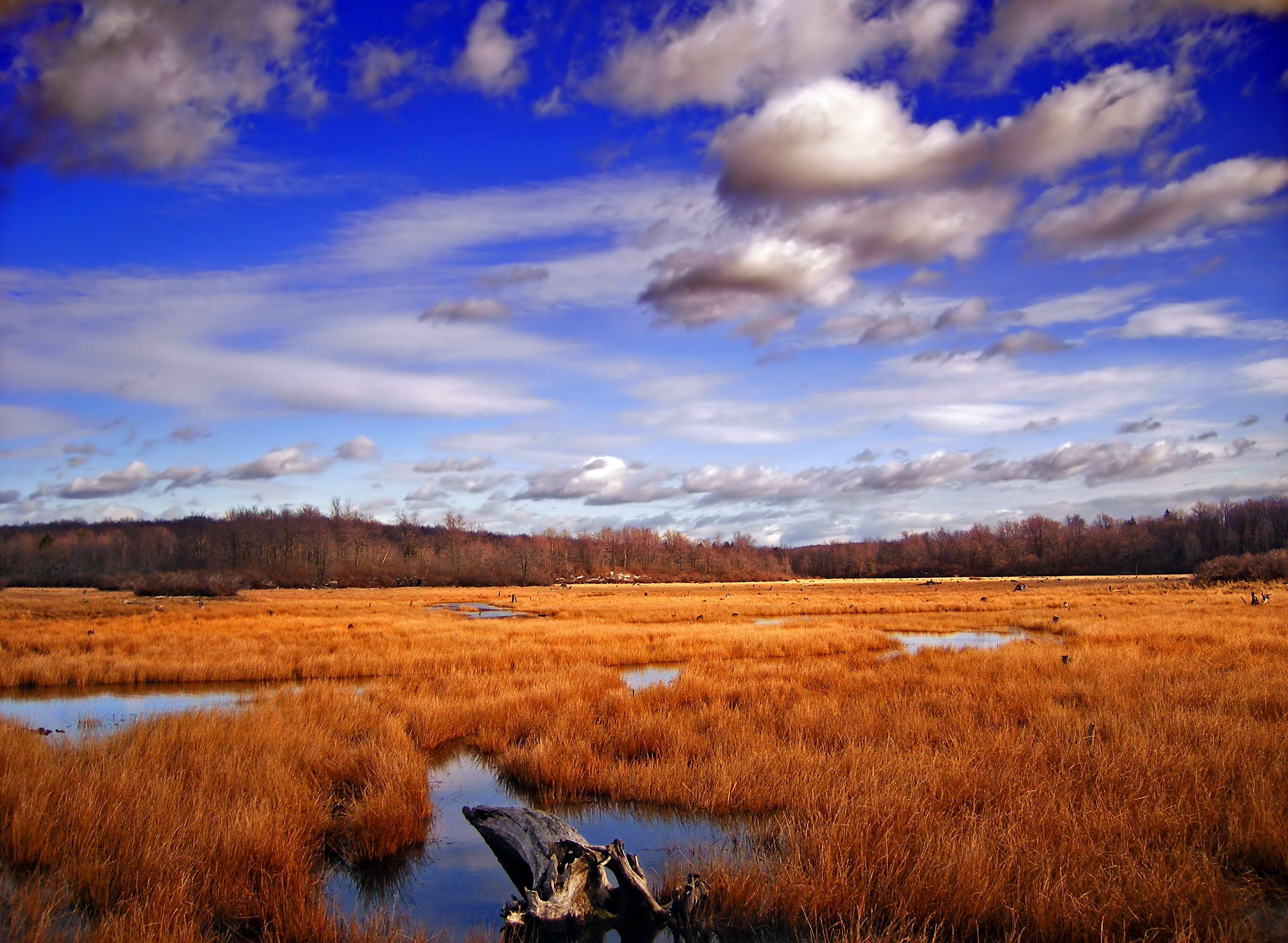

- Location within Pennsylvania Location within the United States
- Interactive map of Gouldsboro State Park
- Location: Monroe and Wayne counties, Pennsylvania, United States
- Coordinates: 41°13′46″N 75°27′48″W
- Area: 2,800 acres (1,100 ha)
- Elevation: 1,909 feet (582 m)
- Established: 1958
- Administrator: Pennsylvania Department of Conservation and Natural Resources
- Visitors: 100,000
- Website: Official website
- Pennsylvania State Parks

Gouldsboro State Park is a 2,880-acre (1,165 ha) Pennsylvania state park in Coolbaugh Township, Monroe County and Lehigh Township, Wayne County, Pennsylvania in the United States. The park includes the 250-acre (100 ha) Gouldsboro Lake. Gouldsboro State Park is located very close to Tobyhanna State Park and Pennsylvania State Game Lands 127 and 312. It is on Pennsylvania Route 507 near the small village of Gouldsboro.

== History ==
Gouldsboro State Park is named for Gouldsboro, which was in turn named for Jay Gould (1836 - 1892). Gould, a native of New York, acquired an immense fortune during the Industrial Revolution, part of which included ownership of ten percent of all the rail tracks in the United States at the time of his death. One of his railroads passed by what is now the eastern boundary of the park. Gould was also the co-owner of a tannery in nearby Thornhurst. Raw hides were shipped from the western United States and Australia on the railroads owned by Gould to Gouldsboro. The hides were then sent to Thornhurst by way of wagons traversing a plank road.

As of 2006, this rail line forms the dividing line between Gouldsboro State Park and Tobyhanna State Park in Monroe County, and is owned by the Lackawanna County Railroad Authority and operated by the Delaware-Lackawanna Railroad Co. Inc. Tourist excursions on this line are operated by Steamtown National Historic Site, and run from Steamtown's yard in Scranton to Tobyhanna.

A dam and spillway were built on an existing lake in 1895 by the North Jersey & Pocono Mountain Ice Company. The new dam allowed more ice to be harvested from the lake in winter. In 1956 the Pennsylvania Fish and Boat Commission took over ownership of the dam. The park opened in 1958 and the dam was transferred to the DCNR in 2003.

Inspections on the dam in 1979 revealed "the dam’s drain gate was inoperable and its spillway was deteriorating". The lake was partially drained in 1985 and 1995 for repairs to the dam and spillway, and completely drained in January 2005. Repairs included removing debris, installing a culvert, fence and erosion control measures, and replacing the spillway. Repairs were completed and the lake was refilled in January 2008.

== Recreation ==
=== Gouldsboro Lake ===
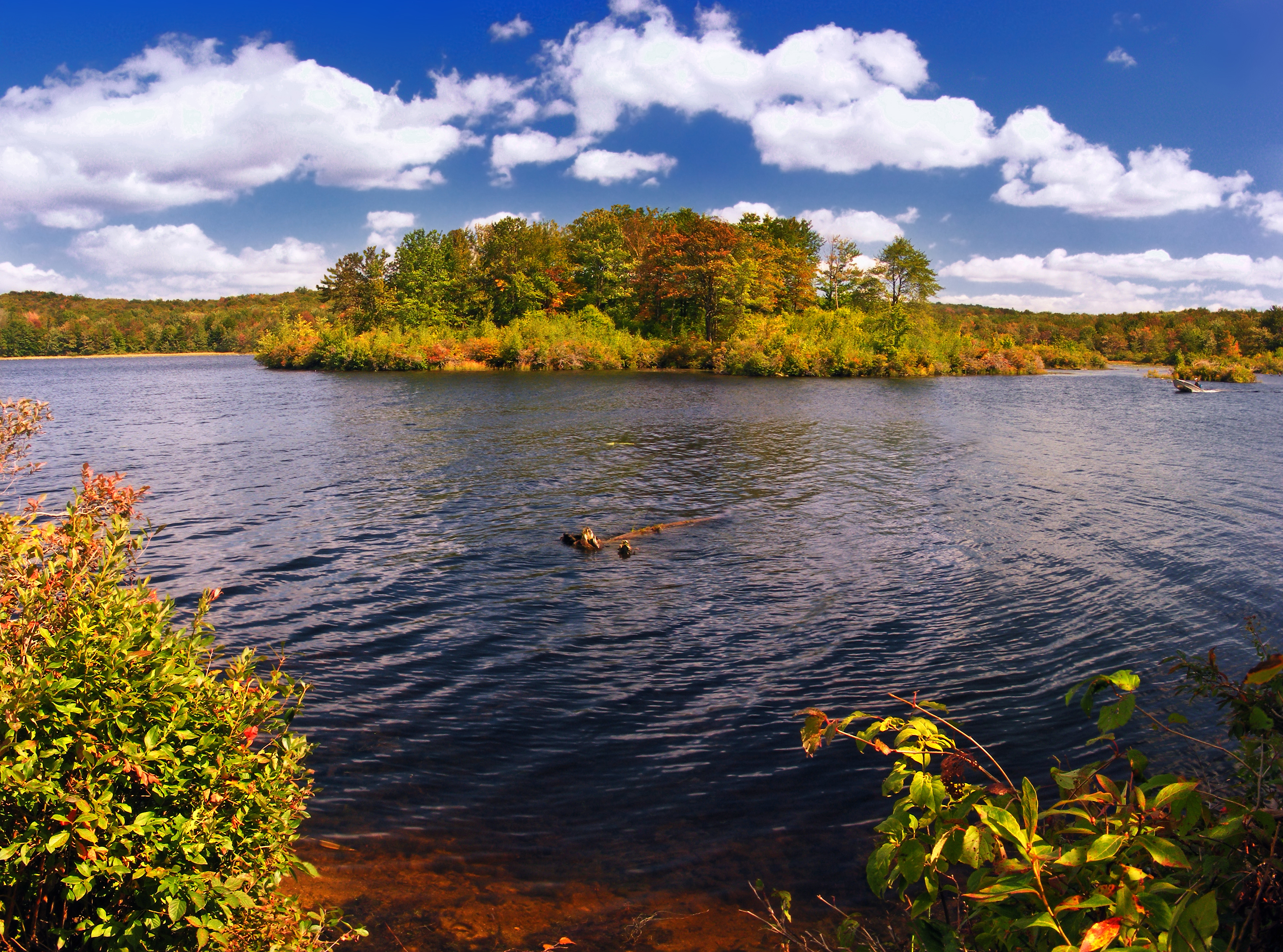
Gouldsboro Lake

Gouldsboro Lake is a 250-acre (100 ha) man made lake. It is open to boating, swimming, fishing and ice fishing. Gas powered boats are prohibited on Gouldsboro Lake. Electric powered and non powered boats must have current registration from any state, or a launch permit from the Pennsylvania Fish and Boat Commission. A beach at the lake is open from Memorial Day weekend through Labor Day weekend. The beach does not have lifeguards. Gouldsboro Lake is a warm water fishery. The common game fish are pickerel, yellow perch, bass, walleye, sunfish, muskellunge, and catfish. Gouldsboro Lake is also a popular ice fishing destination, however the thickness of the ice is not monitored by the park staff so visitors are asked to use caution when venturing out onto the ice.

=== Hunting and trapping ===
Hunting is permitted at Gouldsboro State Park. Hunters are expected to follow the rules and regulations of the Pennsylvania Game Commission. The common game species are squirrels, wild turkey, white-tailed deer, black bear, and snowshoe hare. The hunting of groundhogs is prohibited. The trapping of muskrats, raccoons, beaver, mink, fox, and coyote is permitted with the proper license.

=== Picnics ===
Gouldsboro State Park has five picnic areas with about 300 picnic tables. All five picnic areas are shaded and open year-round. There is one pavilion with an electric hook-up.

=== Trails ===
- Old Route 611 is a 1.25-mile (2 km) "easy" trail that is flat and wide and runs parallel to Interstate 380 on the western edge of the park. The trail is open to hiking, bicycling and cross-country skiing.
- Prospect Rock Trail is a 5.8-mile (9.3 km) "difficult" trail that is a loop that begins and ends in the day use area, passing over some very rugged terrain.
- Frank Gantz Trail is a 3.2-mile (5.1 km) "difficult" trail that connects Gouldsboro State Park with Tobyhanna State Park. The trail is very rocky and therefore very demanding, with an estimated round trip completion time of three hours.

== Climate ==
According to the Trewartha climate classification system, Gouldsboro State Park has a Temperate Continental climate (Dc) with warm summers (b), cold winters (o) and year-around precipitation (Dcbo). Dcbo climates are characterized by at least one month having an average mean temperature ≤ 32.0 °F (0.0 °C), four to seven months with an average mean temperature ≥ 50.0 °F (10.0 °C), all months with an average mean temperature < 72.0 °F (22.2 °C) and no significant precipitation difference between seasons. Although most summer days are comfortably humid in Gouldsboro State Park, episodes of heat and high humidity can occur with heat index values > 92 °F (33 °C). Since 1981, the highest air temperature was 93.5 °F (34.2 °C) on 07/15/1995, and the highest daily average mean dew point was 69.8 °F (21.0 °C) on 08/01/2006. July is the peak month for thunderstorm activity which correlates with the average warmest month of the year. The average wettest month is September which correlates with tropical storm remnants during the peak of the Atlantic hurricane season. Since 1981, the wettest calendar day was 7.57 inches (192 mm) on 09/30/2010. During the winter months, the plant hardiness zone is 5a with an average annual extreme minimum air temperature of −16.1 °F (−26.7 °C). Since 1981, the coldest air temperature was −23.5 °F (−30.8 °C) on 01/21/1994. Episodes of extreme cold and wind can occur with wind chill values < −29 °F (−34 °C). The average snowiest month is January which correlates with the average coldest month of the year. Ice storms and large snowstorms depositing ≥ 12 inches (30 cm) of snow occur nearly every year, particularly during nor’easters from December through March.

Climate data for Gouldsboro State Park, Elevation 1,923 ft (586 m), 1981-2010 normals, extremes 1981-2018
Month	Jan	Feb	Mar	Apr	May	Jun	Jul	Aug	Sep	Oct	Nov	Dec	Year
Record high °F (°C)	61.3 (16.3)	72.1 (22.3)	81.2 (27.3)	86.9 (30.5)	89.4 (31.9)	89.2 (31.8)	93.5 (34.2)	92.3 (33.5)	88.5 (31.4)	82.1 (27.8)	75.0 (23.9)	66.0 (18.9)	93.5 (34.2)
Mean daily maximum °F (°C)	30.7 (−0.7)	34.3 (1.3)	42.5 (5.8)	55.0 (12.8)	66.0 (18.9)	74.0 (23.3)	78.1 (25.6)	76.7 (24.8)	69.4 (20.8)	57.9 (14.4)	47.0 (8.3)	35.1 (1.7)	55.7 (13.2)
Daily mean °F (°C)	22.2 (−5.4)	25.1 (−3.8)	32.4 (0.2)	44.1 (6.7)	54.5 (12.5)	62.9 (17.2)	67.4 (19.7)	66.1 (18.9)	58.9 (14.9)	47.5 (8.6)	38.1 (3.4)	27.2 (−2.7)	45.6 (7.6)
Mean daily minimum °F (°C)	13.7 (−10.2)	15.9 (−8.9)	22.3 (−5.4)	33.2 (0.7)	42.9 (6.1)	51.8 (11.0)	56.6 (13.7)	55.4 (13.0)	48.3 (9.1)	37.1 (2.8)	29.2 (−1.6)	19.4 (−7.0)	35.6 (2.0)
Record low °F (°C)	−23.5 (−30.8)	−14.5 (−25.8)	−9.9 (−23.3)	9.0 (−12.8)	26.3 (−3.2)	31.4 (−0.3)	36.3 (2.4)	32.4 (0.2)	26.1 (−3.3)	15.6 (−9.1)	−2.8 (−19.3)	−17.2 (−27.3)	−23.5 (−30.8)
Average precipitation inches (mm)	3.54 (90)	3.04 (77)	3.75 (95)	4.36 (111)	4.34 (110)	4.76 (121)	4.60 (117)	3.94 (100)	4.93 (125)	4.70 (119)	4.20 (107)	3.80 (97)	49.96 (1,269)
Average snowfall inches (cm)	19.9 (51)	14.3 (36)	14.8 (38)	3.5 (8.9)	0.0 (0.0)	0.0 (0.0)	0.0 (0.0)	0.0 (0.0)	0.0 (0.0)	0.1 (0.25)	3.8 (9.7)	12.0 (30)	68.5 (174)
Average relative humidity (%)	74.7	68.5	64.6	60.5	62.4	71.9	71.8	74.6	75.9	72.5	70.9	75.6	70.3
Average dew point °F (°C)	15.4 (−9.2)	16.2 (−8.8)	21.8 (−5.7)	31.3 (−0.4)	41.9 (5.5)	53.7 (12.1)	58.0 (14.4)	57.8 (14.3)	51.3 (10.7)	39.1 (3.9)	29.5 (−1.4)	20.5 (−6.4)	36.5 (2.5)
Source: PRISM

== Ecology ==
According to the A. W. Kuchler U.S. potential natural vegetation types, Gouldsboro State Park would have a dominant vegetation type of Northern Hardwood (106) with a dominant vegetation form of Northern hardwood forest (26). The peak spring bloom typically occurs in early-May and peak fall color usually occurs in early-October. The plant hardiness zone is 5a with an average annual extreme minimum air temperature of −16.1 °F (−26.7 °C).
