= Pennsylvania Route 196 =

State highway in Pennsylvania, US

Pennsylvania Route 196

Route information
- Maintained by PennDOT
- Length: 25.736 mi (41.418 km)

Major junctions
- South end: PA 611 / PA 940 in Mount Pocono
- PA 423 near Tobyhanna; PA 507 in Angels; PA 191 in Hamlin; PA 590 in Hamlin
- North end: PA 296 in Varden

Location
- Country: United States
- State: Pennsylvania
- Counties: Monroe, Wayne

Highway system
- Pennsylvania State Route System; Interstate; US; State; Scenic; Legislative
← PA 194	→ PA 197

Pennsylvania Route 196 (PA 196) is a state highway in the Pocono Mountains of Pennsylvania, United States, with a length of 25.7 miles (41.4 km). It runs from PA 611 and PA 940 in Mount Pocono in Monroe County north to PA 296 in Varden in Wayne County. The route is a two-lane undivided road that runs through rural areas. PA 196 intersects PA 423 near Tobyhanna State Park before entering Wayne County, where it crosses PA 507 in Angels and passes through Sterling. The route forms a concurrency with PA 191 and has a junction with PA 590 in Hamlin. Upon splitting from PA 191, PA 196 continues north to its end at PA 296.

PA 196 follows a part of the alignment of the Belmont and Easton Turnpike, a turnpike between Belmont and Easton that was chartered in 1812 and completed in 1820. PA 196 was designated in the 1930s between U.S. Route 611 (US 611, now PA 611) and PA 615 (now PA 940) in Mount Pocono and PA 296 in Varden. The route was progressively improved and paved over the years, becoming fully paved in the 1970s. In 1956, PA 196 was extended southeast from Mount Pocono to an interchange with US 611, now Interstate 80 (I-80), in East Stroudsburg. The southern terminus reverted to its current location in the 1960s, with the former alignment now PA 940 between Mount Pocono and Paradise Valley, PA 191 between Paradise Valley and Analomink, PA 447 between Analomink and East Stroudsburg, and US 209 leading to the interchange with I-80.

== Route description ==
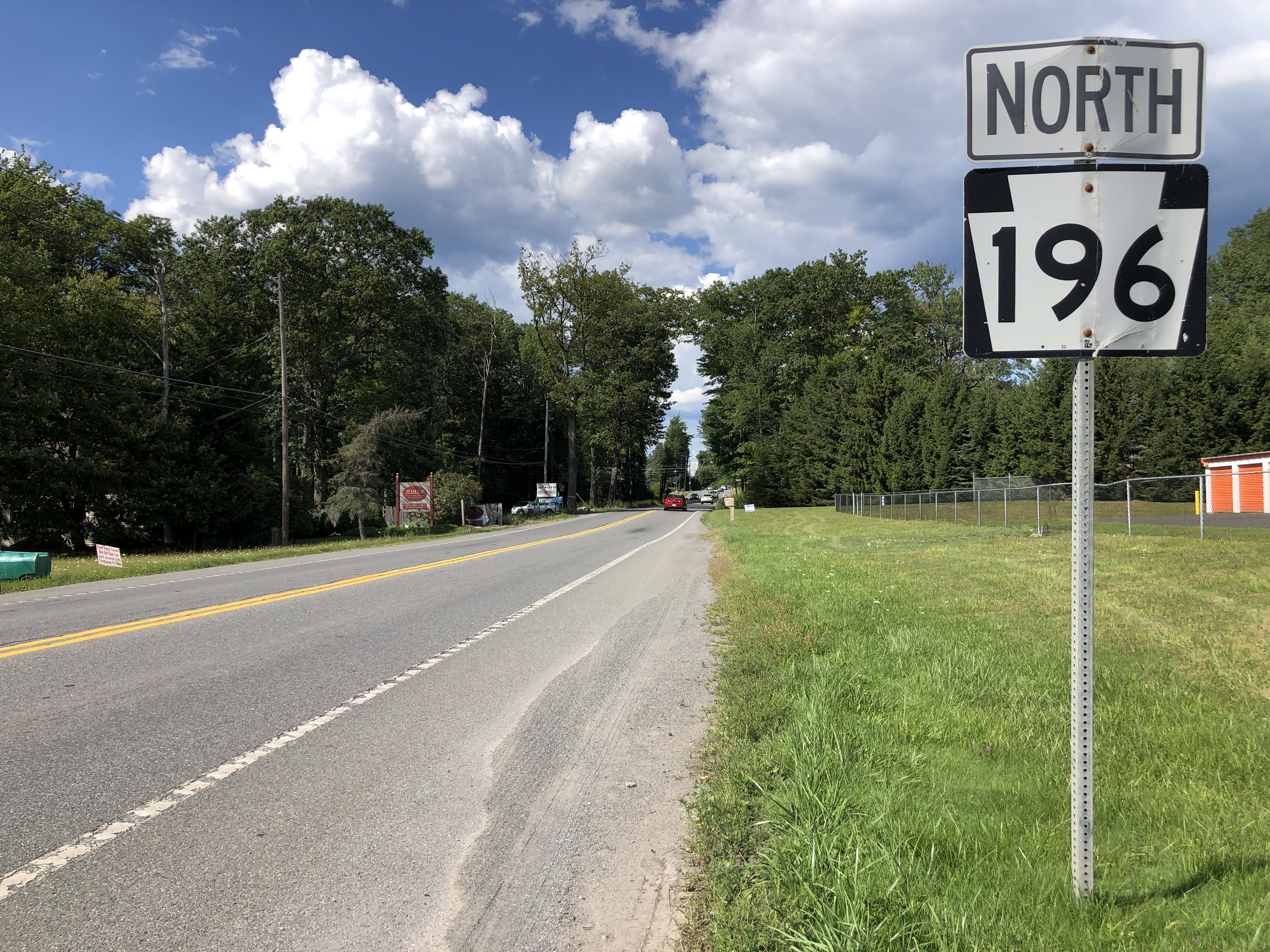
PA 196 northbound in Coolbaugh Township

PA 196 begins at an intersection with PA 611 and PA 940 in the borough of Mount Pocono in Monroe County, heading north along two-lane undivided Sterling Road. The road heads through forested areas with some residential and commercial development, crossing into Coolbaugh Township. The route runs to the west of the Mushroom Farm housing development before passing three tracts of the Pocono Country Place residential development. PA 196 comes to an intersection with PA 423 at a sharp angle east of Tobyhanna and continues north through dense forests along the eastern border of Tobyhanna State Park.

The route crosses into Dreher Township in Wayne County and continues through wooded areas as South Turnpike Road. Past the state park, the road passes east of the Breezewood Acres housing development before it runs near more neighborhoods and crosses PA 507 in the community of Angels. PA 196 heads northwest through forests and enters Sterling Township, where the name becomes Sterling Road. The route curves back to the north and runs through woodland with some fields and homes, passing through the communities of Jericho and Sterling. The road crosses over the eastbound lanes of I-84 and under the westbound lanes of I-84 without an interchange before it reaches an intersection with PA 191, which provides access to I-84.

At this point, PA 196 heads north for a concurrency with PA 191 on Easton Turnpike, continuing through rural areas and crossing the West Branch Wallenpaupack Creek into Salem Township. The road passes through a mix of farmland and woodland with some homes, coming to an intersection with PA 590 in the community of Hamlin among residential and commercial development. North of here, the two routes run through more farms and woods before PA 191 splits to the northeast. PA 196 continues north along Easton Turnpike into Lake Township, running through forested areas with some fields and homes. The road passes through the community of Tresslarville as it heads through more rural land, winding north through woods. The route enters South Canaan Township and soon reaches its northern terminus at PA 296 in the community of Varden. Easton Turnpike continues north as part of PA 296.

== History ==
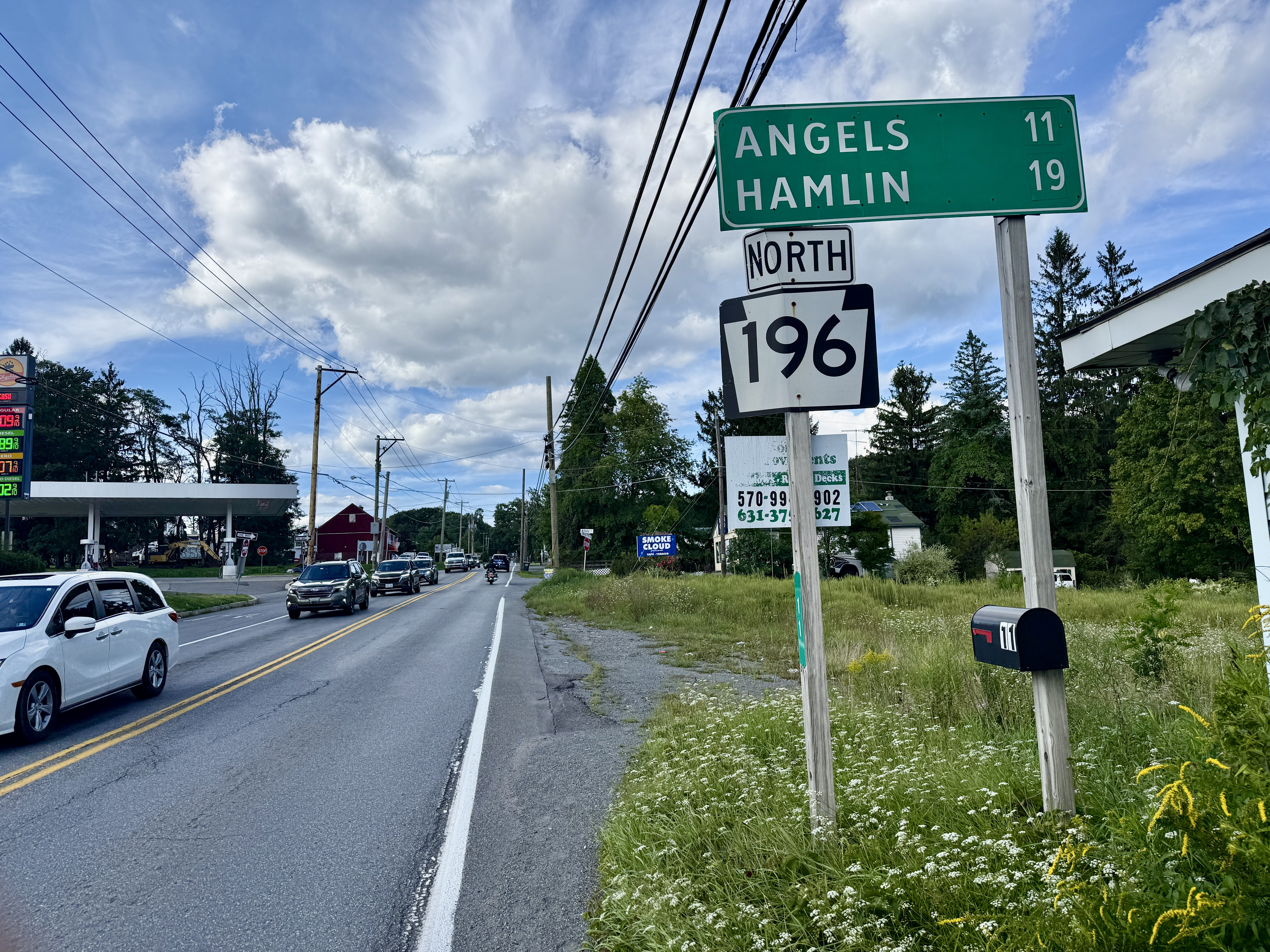
PA 196 northbound past southern terminus at PA 611 and PA 940 in Mount Pocono

PA 196 follows part of the alignment of the Belmont and Easton Turnpike, a turnpike that was chartered on March 15, 1812 to run along the North and South road between the Easton and Wilkes-Barre Turnpike in Northampton County and the community of Belmont in Mount Pleasant Township, Wayne County. The turnpike was completed in 1819-1820. The Belmont and Easton Turnpike was used to transport cattle and sheep from Western New York to Easton and Philadelphia. The turnpike saw heavy traffic in its early days but traffic would decline with the rise of the railroads and other roads.

When Pennsylvania first legislated routes in 1911, what is now PA 196 was not given a route number. By 1930, the road between Mount Pocono and Varden was an unnumbered, unpaved road, with the section between north of Sterling and north of Hamlin designated as part of PA 90 (now PA 191). At this time, the section of PA 90 north of Hamlin was under construction. PA 196 was designated in the 1930s to run between US 611 (now PA 611) and PA 615 (now PA 940) in Mount Pocono and PA 296 in Varden. During the 1930s, the route was paved between Mount Pocono and PA 490 (now PA 423), along the PA 90 concurrency, and for a distance to the south of Varden while the portions between south of Sterling and PA 90 and from PA 90 to south of Varden were improved but unpaved. The sections of PA 196 between PA 490 and the border of Monroe and Wayne counties, between south of Sterling and PA 90, and between PA 90 and south of Varden were paved during the 1940s while a small section north of the PA 507 intersection in Angels was improved.

In 1956, PA 196 was extended south from Mount Pocono to an interchange with US 611 (later I-80) in East Stroudsburg, heading east from Mount Pocono to Paradise Valley, southeast concurrent with PA 90 between Paradise Valley and south of Analomink, and continuing southeast through the northern part of East Stroudsburg to the interchange. During the 1950s, the route was paved between PA 507 in Angels and south of Sterling while the section between the Monroe/Wayne county line and PA 507 in Angels was improved. The southern terminus of PA 196 was cut back to US 611/PA 940 in Mount Pocono in the 1960s, with the former route south of there becoming a rerouted PA 940 between Mount Pocono and Paradise Valley, solely PA 191 (which replaced PA 90) between Paradise Valley and Analomink, and PA 447 between Analomink and East Stroudsburg, and the southernmost section to I-80 becoming a rerouted US 209. The section of PA 196 between the border of Monroe and Wayne counties and PA 507 in Angels was paved in the 1970s.

== Major intersections ==
County	Location	mi	km	Destinations	Notes
Monroe	Mount Pocono	0.000	0.000	PA 611 / PA 940 (Pocono Boulevard/Pocono Summit Road) to I-380 – East Stroudsburg, Stroudsburg, Blakeslee	Southern terminus of PA 196
Monroe	Coolbaugh Township	7.065	11.370	PA 423 north – South Sterling	South end of PA 423 overlap
Monroe	Coolbaugh Township	7.073	11.383	PA 423 south to I-380 – Tobyhanna	North end of PA 423 overlap
Wayne	Dreher Township	10.816	17.407	PA 507 (Millcreek Road)	
Wayne	Sterling Township	17.219	27.711	PA 191 south (Twin Rocks Road) to I-84	South end of PA 191 overlap
Wayne	Salem Township	20.113	32.369	PA 590 (Hamlin Highway) – Scranton, Hawley	
Wayne	Lake Township	21.227	34.162	PA 191 north (Lake Ariel Highway) – Lake Ariel	North end of PA 191 overlap
Wayne	South Canaan Township	25.736	41.418	PA 296 (Easton Turnpike/Gravity Hill Road)	Northern terminus of PA 196
1.000 mi = 1.609 km; 1.000 km = 0.621 mi: Concurrency terminus
