= Tobyhanna State Park =

Pennsylvania state park

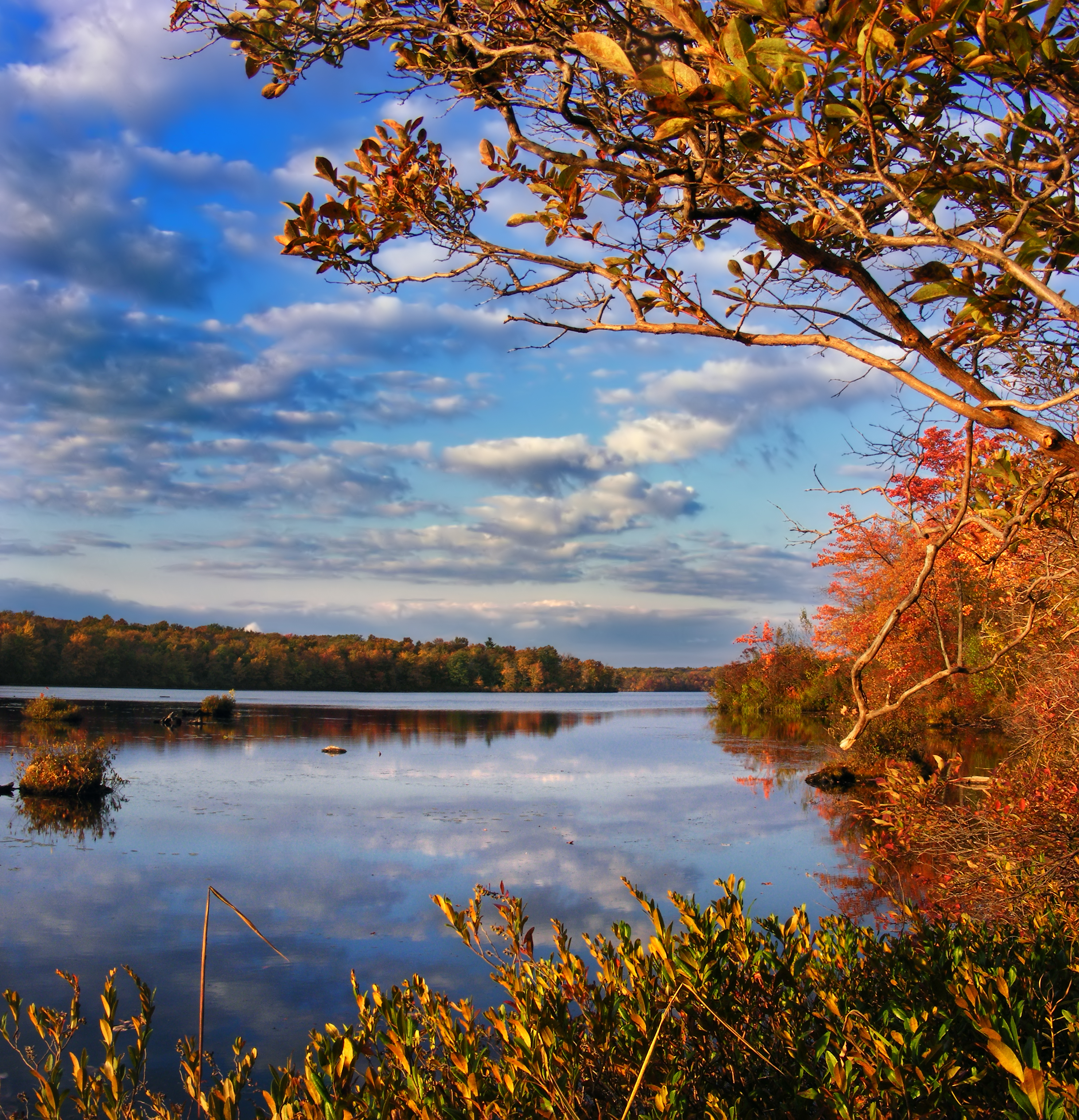

- Location within Pennsylvania Location within the United States
- Interactive map of Tobyhanna State Park
- Location: Monroe and Wayne counties, Pennsylvania, United States
- Coordinates: 41°12′26″N 75°23′47″W
- Area: 5,440 acres (2,200 ha)
- Elevation: 2,005 feet (611 m)
- Established: 1949
- Administrator: Pennsylvania Department of Conservation and Natural Resources
- Website: Official website
- Pennsylvania State Parks

Tobyhanna State Park is a Pennsylvania state park on 5,440 acres (2,201 ha) mostly in Coolbaugh Township, Monroe County, with a small portion of the park in Dreher and Lehigh townships in Wayne County, all in Pennsylvania in the United States. The park includes the 170-acre (69 ha) Tobyhanna Lake and a portion of Tobyhanna Creek. It is located 2.1 miles (3.4 km) north of the town of Tobyhanna, with the main park entrance on Pennsylvania Route 423, and a portion (Yellow hiking trail) that borders on Pennsylvania Route 196. The park lies immediately adjacent to Gouldsboro State Park, Pennsylvania State Game Lands 312, and State Game Land 127.

== History ==
=== Former Artillery Range ===
Tobyhanna State Park is one of the state lands carved from a large artillery training range that preceded Tobyhanna Army Depot. According to the Pennsylvania DCNR,

Visitors using more remote and undeveloped areas of Tobyhanna State Park should be aware that they may encounter old, unexploded artillery shells. Three types of shells have been found in the park. The largest projectile is 18 to 24 inches (460 to 610 mm) in length and about 6 inches (150 mm) in diameter. The medium projectile is 2.5 inches (64 mm) in diameter and about 10 to 14 inches (250 to 360 mm) in length. The smallest projectile is 3 inches (76 mm) long and 1.25 inches (32 mm) in diameter. Shells are found in severely rusted condition without any recognizable markings or imprints. Their overall appearance is that of a pointed cylinder of rusted steel. Visitors encountering such items should not touch, attempt to move or otherwise disturb the items, and should call the park office and report the location to ensure proper disposal.

=== Rail line ===
The western boundary of Tobyhanna State Park is formed by a rail line once owned by Jay Gould. Gould, a native of New York, acquired an immense fortune during the Industrial Revolution, part of which included ownership of ten percent of all the rail tracks in the United States at the time of his death. One of his railroads passed by what is now the western boundary of the park. Gould was also the co-owner of a tannery in nearby Thornhurst. Raw hides were shipped from the western United States and Australia on the railroads owned by Gould to the village of Gouldsboro (just west of the park in Wayne County). The hides were then sent to Thornhurst by way of wagons traversing a plank road.

As of 2018, this rail line forms the dividing line between Tobyhanna State Park and Gouldsboro State Park in Monroe County. It is owned by the Pennsylvania Northeast Regional Railroad Authority and operated by the Delaware-Lackawanna Railroad Co. Inc. Tourist excursions on this line are operated by Steamtown National Historic Site, and run from Steamtown's yard in Scranton to Tobyhanna, as well as other nearby destinations including Gouldsboro, Cresco, East Stroudsburg, and Delaware Water Gap. This rail line is part of the plan to resume passenger rail service between Scranton, PA and Hoboken, NJ via the Lackawanna Cutoff, with trains operated as part of the NJ Transit Rail System.

== Facilities ==
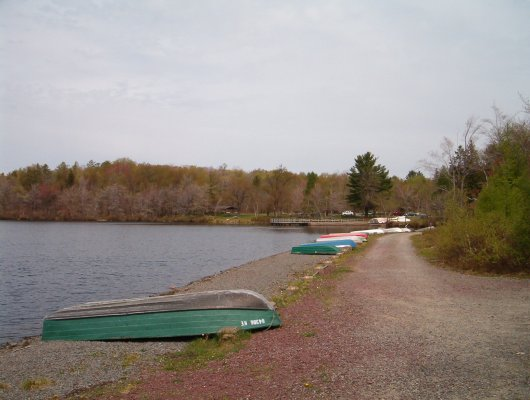
Fishing pier and boat rental

Rowboats and canoes can be rented at Tobyhanna Lake daily from Memorial Day Weekend to Labor Day, except in inclement weather. 60 overnight mooring spaces are available under permit. Boats must be registered and can only use electric motors. A sand beach (unguarded) is open from 8 am to sunset from late May to mid-September. 300 picnic tables and a reservable picnic pavilion are available throughout the year.

== Hiking trails ==
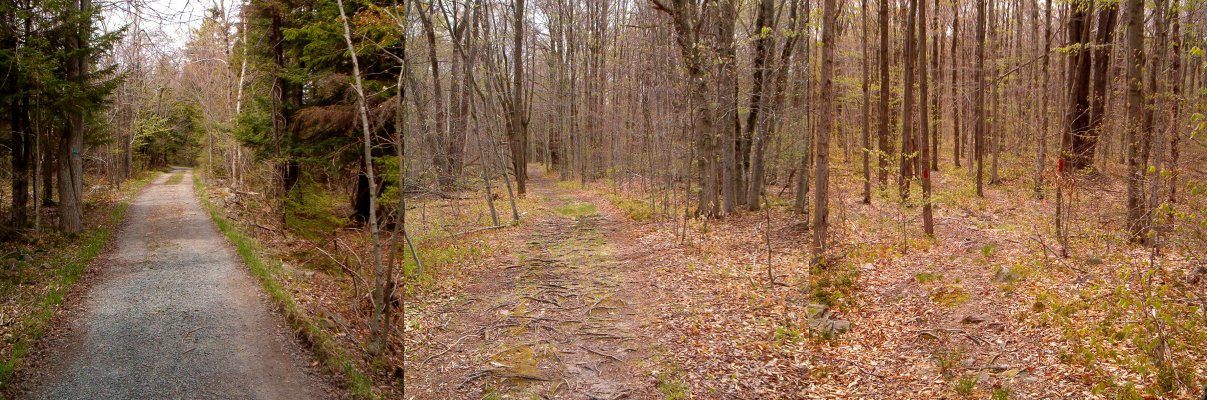
Left to right: Blue, yellow, and red trails

The trails in the park are well-marked; often half a dozen bright blazes of paint are visible at once. A 5.1-mile (8.2 km) blue-blazed trail circles the lake; it is level, well-cleared and generally gravelled; "Although not recommended for persons with disabilities, wheelchair users have completed the trail" A 3.3-mile (5.3 km) yellow-blazed trail extending northeast to Pennsylvania Route 196 and a 3.2-mile (5.1 km) red-blazed trail linking the park to Gouldsboro State Park to the northwest are more difficult to pass due to tree roots and stones.

== Soundscape ==
The park is close to Interstate 380 to the west-southwest, and the western portion of the park suffers frequent vehicular noise. Some vehicle noise is also present to the south of the lake from Pennsylvania Route 423. (Light plane traffic emanates from the Mount Pocono Municipal Airport, approximately 4-mile (6.4 km) to the south. Other noise from park maintenance, constant restroom fans, vending machines, and residential neighbors affect the southern margin of the lake. The quietest portion of the park on marked trails is partway along the yellow trail north of its crossing of the Tobyhanna Creek, where natural sounds prevail a majority of the time.

== Winter facilities ==
A 1.2-acre (0.49 ha) ice skating area and a 5.5-mile (8.9 km) one-way snowmobile trail are designated during the winter. Ice fishing is popular, but ice thickness must be monitored by the user.

== Hunting ==
Hunting is permitted on the park land and adjacent game lands except on Tobyhanna Lake and a small crescent of land to the east of Tobyhanna Lake. Signs demarcate the regions of the park where hunting is permitted, and admonish visitors to wear orange to be seen.

== Accommodations ==
Five sites are available for organized group tenting of 20-40 people each. A 140-site camping area is available with hand-operated water pumps, flush toilets, and a dump station for trailers. There are several pet friendly sites. There is a pavilion and a separate picnic area, sandbeach, volleyball net as well as swimming in the Tobyhanna Lake.
