= Michael Bamiro =

American gridiron football player (born 1990)

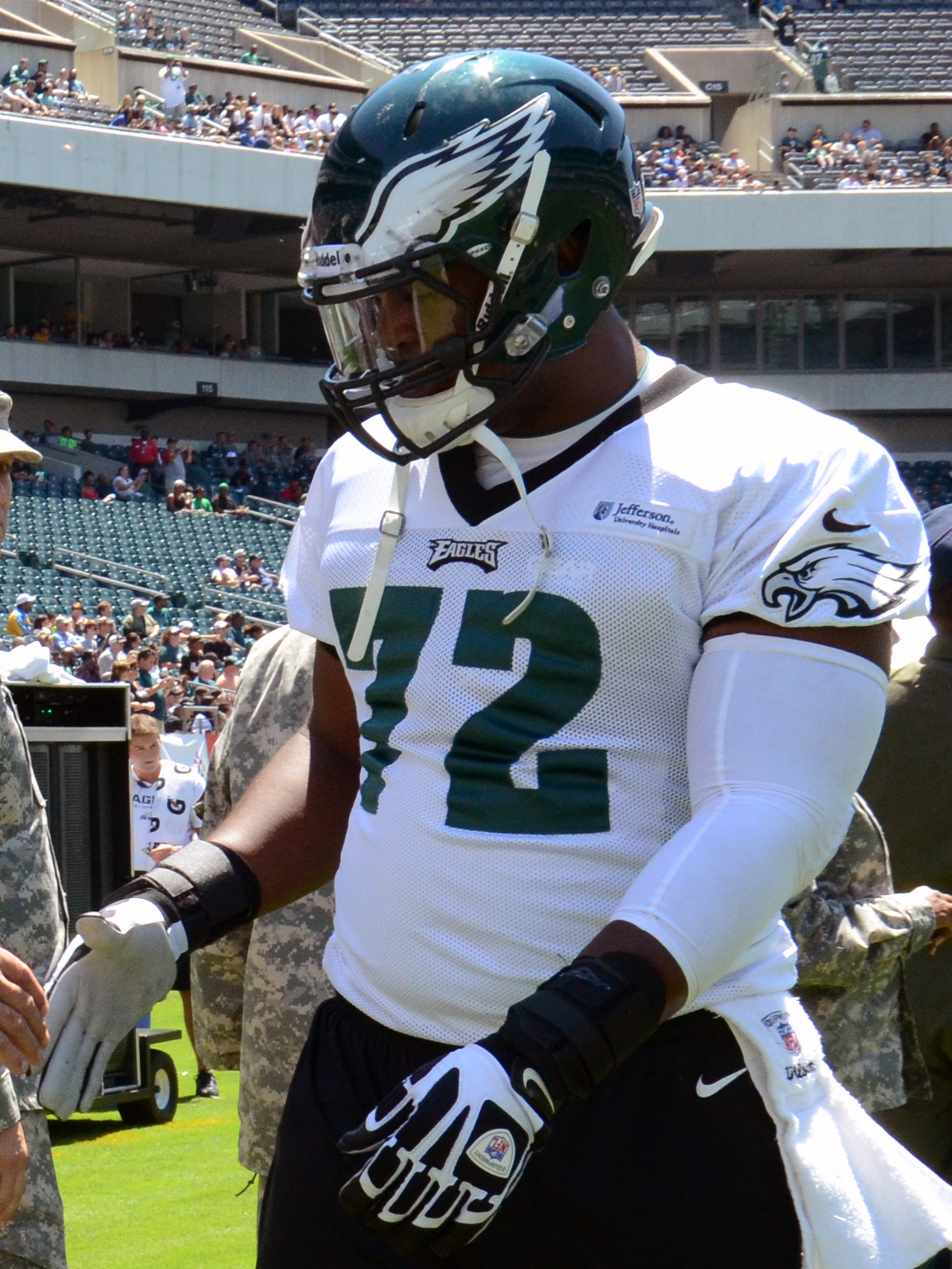
- Bamiro with the Philadelphia Eagles in 2013

No. 64, 74
- Position: Offensive tackle

Personal information
- Born: October 9, 1990 (age 36); Brooklyn, New York, U.S.
- Listed height: 6 ft 8 in (2.03 m)
- Listed weight: 340 lb (154 kg)

Career information
- High school: Pocono Summit (PA) Mountain West
- College: Stony Brook
- NFL draft: 2013: undrafted

Career history
- Philadelphia Eagles (2013−2014)*; New York Giants (2014−2015)*; Montreal Alouettes (2016)*; Washington Valor (2018)
- * Offseason or practice squad member only

Awards and highlights
- First-team All-Big South (2012)
- Stats at Pro Football Reference

Michael Bamiro (born October 9, 1990) is an American former football offensive tackle. He played college football at Stony Brook University. He was a member of the Philadelphia Eagles and New York Giants of the National Football League (NFL), the Montreal Alouettes of the Canadian Football League (CFL), and the Washington Valor of the Arena Football League (AFL).

== Early life ==
He attended Pocono Mountain West High School in Pennsylvania. He was an honorable mention all-conference and was the team captain in his senior season.

== Professional career ==
On July 16, 2013, he signed with the Philadelphia Eagles as an undrafted free agent. On August 31, 2013, he was released before being brought back onto the practice squad. He was released by the Eagles on August 23, 2014.

Bamiro was signed to the New York Giants' practice squad on November 26, 2014. He signed a futures contract with the Giants on December 29, 2014. On September 1, 2015, Bamiro was waived by the Giants.

Bamiro joined the Montreal Alouettes (CFL) practice roster on August 14, 2016. He was released by the Alouettes on February 7, 2017, after spending the 2016 season on their practice roster.

On March 23, 2018, he was assigned to the Washington Valor (AFL). He was placed on injured reserve before the start of the season on April 6, 2018, and placed on reassignment on July 2, 2018.
