= Tobyhanna Creek =

Tributary of the Lehigh River in eastern Pennsylvania

Coordinates: 41.122339°N 75.648758°W

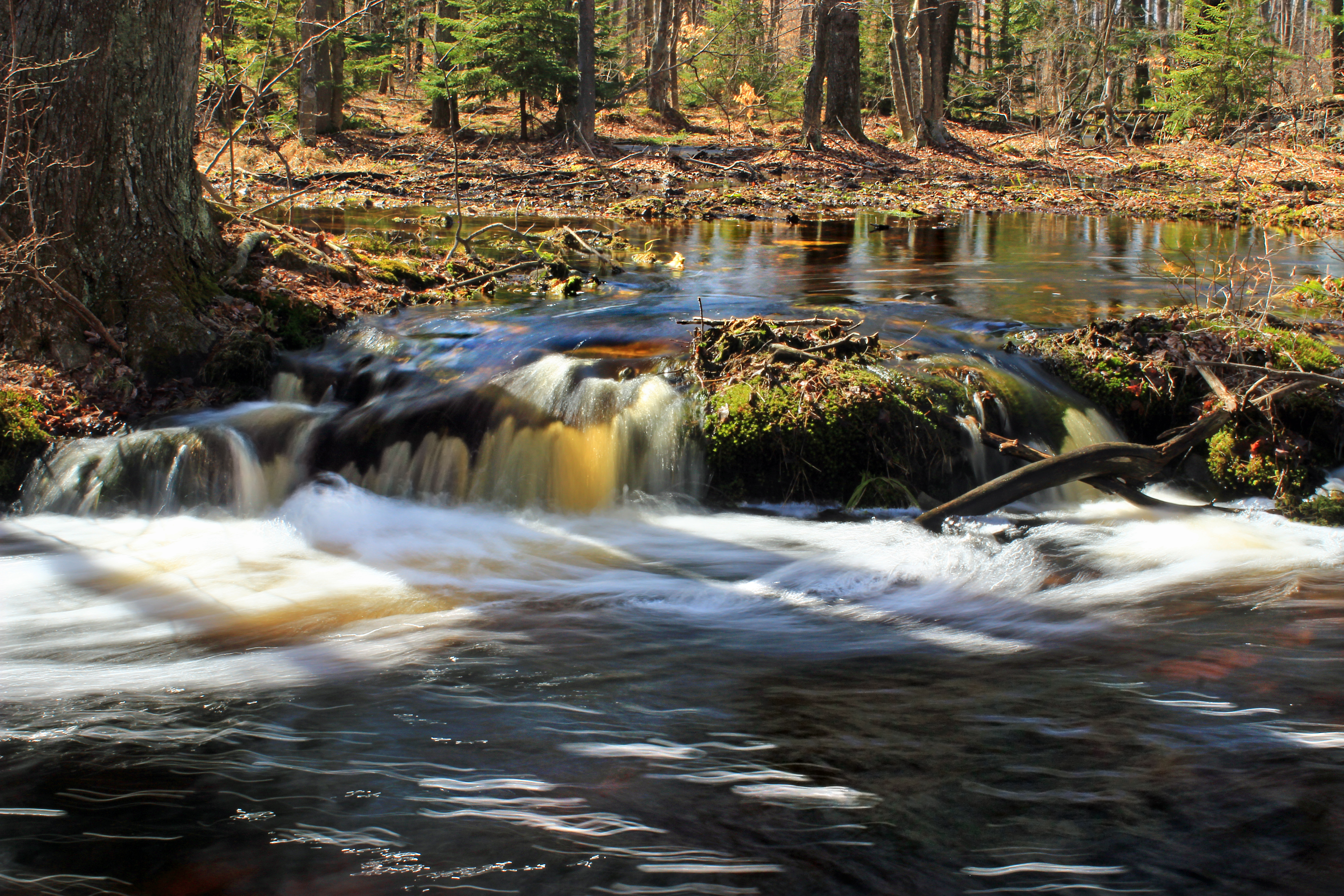
Tobyhanna Creek in 2017

Tobyhanna Creek is a 29.9-mile-long (48.1 km) tributary of the Lehigh River in the Pocono Mountains of eastern Pennsylvania in the United States.

The upper reaches of the creek pass through or near Tobyhanna Township, Tobyhanna Army Depot and Tobyhanna State Park.

Tunkhannock Creek joins Tobyhanna Creek near Blakeslee in Monroe County.

Tobyhanna Creek (Native American for "a stream whose banks are fringed with alder") joins the Lehigh River at the community of Stoddartsville, 6.1 miles (9.8 km) upstream of the Francis E. Walter Dam.

== See also ==
- List of rivers of Pennsylvania
