= Tobyhanna, Pennsylvania =

Unincorporated community in Pennsylvania, US

Tobyhanna
- Unincorporated area
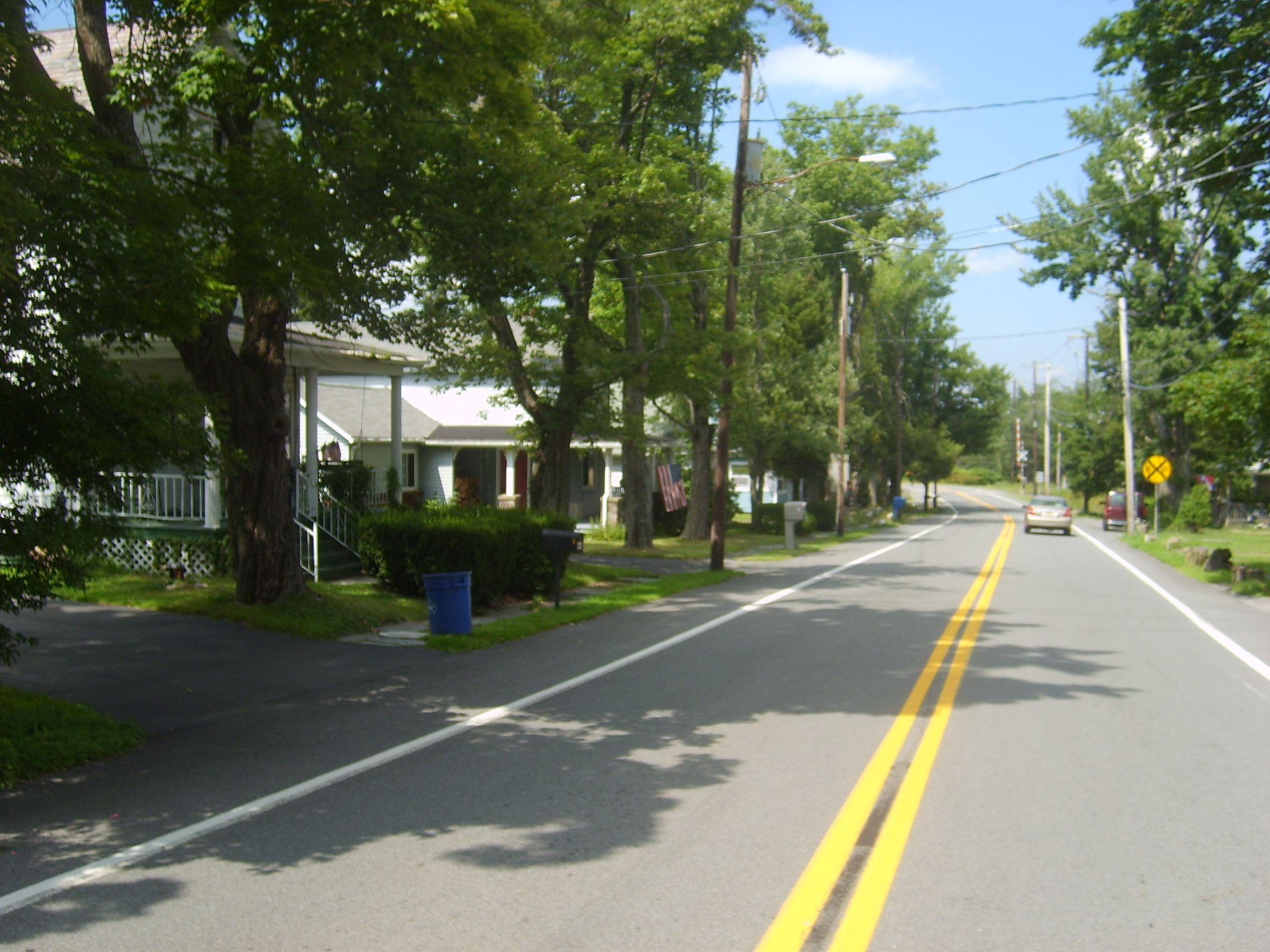
- Etymology: Topi-hanne, Delaware for "alder streams"
- Motto: No place better, ready for whatever
- Location of Tobyhanna in Pennsylvania Tobyhanna (the United States)
- Coordinates: 41°10′37.1″N 75°24′58.1″W
- Country: United States
- State: Pennsylvania
- County: Monroe
- Township: Coolbaugh Township
- Established: 1830

Area
  - Total: 52.8 sq mi (137 km^{2})
  - Land: 50.4 sq mi (131 km^{2})
  - Water: 2.4 sq mi (6.2 km^{2})
- Elevation: 1,568 ft (478 m)

Population (2000)
  - Total: 6,152
  - Density: 122/sq mi (47.1/km^{2})
- Time zone: UTC-5 (EST)
  - Summer (DST): UTC-4 (EDT)
- ZIP code: 18466
- Area code: 570
- Website: www.tobyhanna.com

Tobyhanna is an unincorporated community that is located in Coolbaugh Township in Monroe County, Pennsylvania. Despite its name, it is not located in Tobyhanna Township.

== History ==
"Tobyhanna" is derived from a Lenape word meaning "a stream whose banks are fringed with alder."

During the late 1800s, the Tobyhanna and Lehigh Lumber Company operated a lumber mill, clothespin factory, and silk mill in what was then called the Village of Tobyhanna Mills. In September 1900, N S Brittain, a prominent resident of Coolbaugh Township and cashier of the East Stroudsburg Bank, purchased virtually the entire village, consisting of more than thirty dwellings and 120 acres of the land but none of the former mill equipment. The lumber company sold the land, depleted of its lumber, for US$10,000. The Monroe Water Supply Company had purchased most of the lumber company's property, over 32,000 acres (13,000 ha), in March 1899. The site was transitioning from forest products to the harvesting of ice.

From approximately 1900 to 1936, Tobyhanna lakes were the site of active ice industries. The ice was cut from the lakes during the winter and stored in large barn-like structures. During the rest of the year, the ice was added to railroad boxcars hauling fresh produce and meats destined for East Coast cities.

In 1912, Tobyhanna had a Delaware, Lackawanna & Western railway station, Tobyhanna station, telegraph, and post office. The federal government acquired land within Tobyhanna that became the Tobyhanna Military Reservation, later Tobyhanna Army Depot, which was used as an Artillery training ground. Edward B. Reed, in The Field Artillery Journal (January–March 1917), described Tobyhanna based on his experiences with the Yale Batteries during their training:

"The camp at Tobyhanna is on a rocky, treeless crest from which no trace of man is visible. About are mountains and uncultivated valleys. The village of Tobyhanna is interesting only because it contains a station that enables you to leave it. No better place for work could be found."

In recent years, due to its location between the New York and Philadelphia metropolitan areas and the development of new homes, many families have moved to the Poconos. Some Tobyhanna residents choose to commute to the city via Interstate 380, Interstate 80, or Interstate 84. Pennsylvania Route 611 runs southeast from Tobyhanna towards Pocono Township.

Today, the train route east toward New York has lain dormant since the mid-1960s; however, work is underway towards possible extension of commuter rail (Lackawanna Cut-Off Restoration Project) to the village, as a means to reduce roadway crowding en route to New York City.

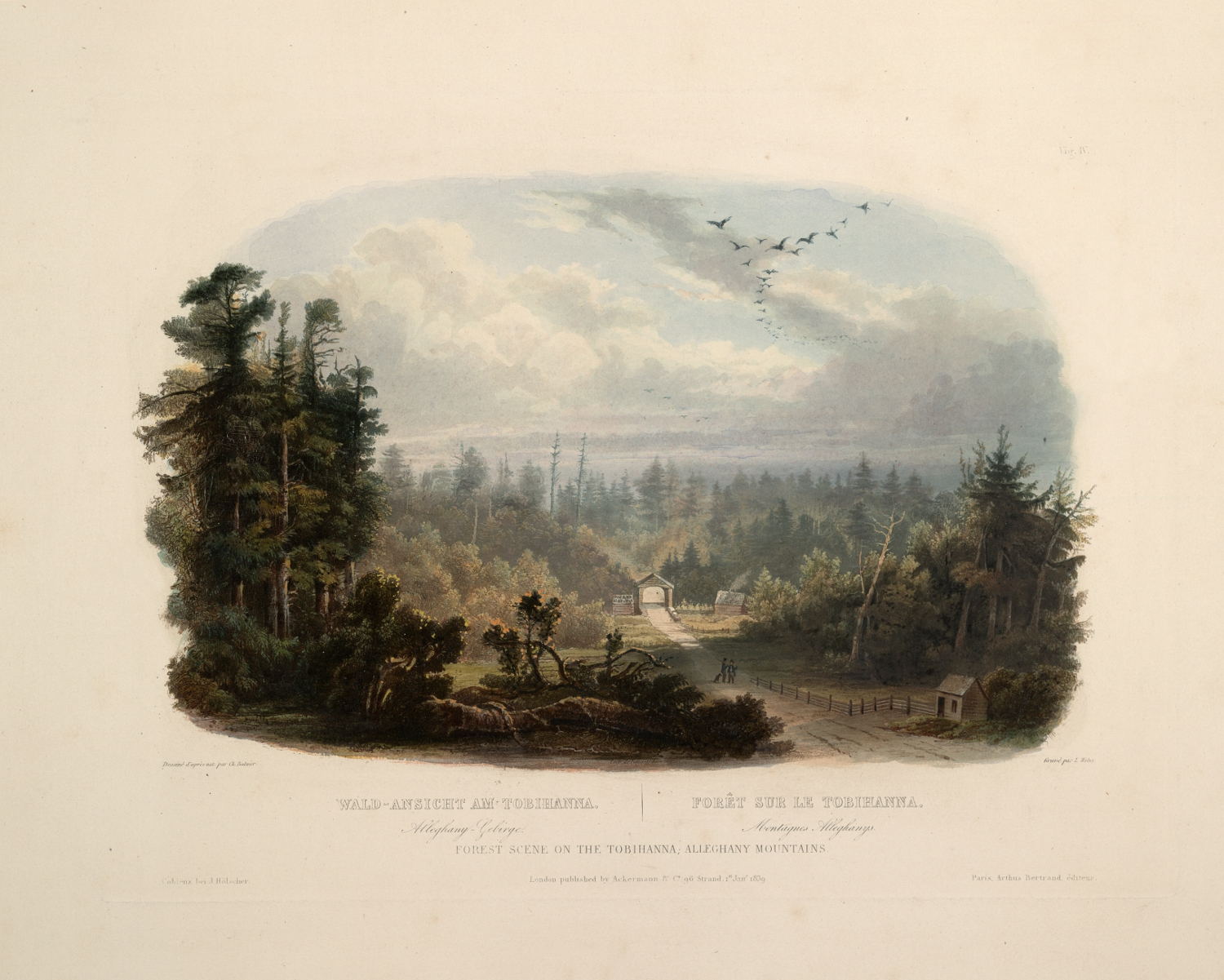
Forest scene on the Tobihanna, Alleghany Mountains (circa 1832): aquatint by Karl Bodmer from the book "Maximilian, Prince of Wied’s Travels in the Interior of North America, during the years 1832–1834"

== Geography ==
The landscape of the area is of broad, flat areas intermixed with low hills covered with a northern hardwood forest. Common tree species are beech, birch, and maple.

== Education ==
Two schools are located within Tobyhanna: Clear Run Elementary Center (CREC), which teaches Kindergarten through second grade, and Clear Run Intermediate School (CRIS), which generally houses students grades three through six. The two schools share the Clear Run campus, which is located on Memorial Boulevard (PA-611). Tobyhanna schools are part of the Pocono Mountain School District. Clear Run Intermediate School was built in 1995; Clear Run Elementary Center was built in 1997.
