= Tobyhanna Township, Pennsylvania =

Township in Pennsylvania, US

Tobyhanna Township
- Township
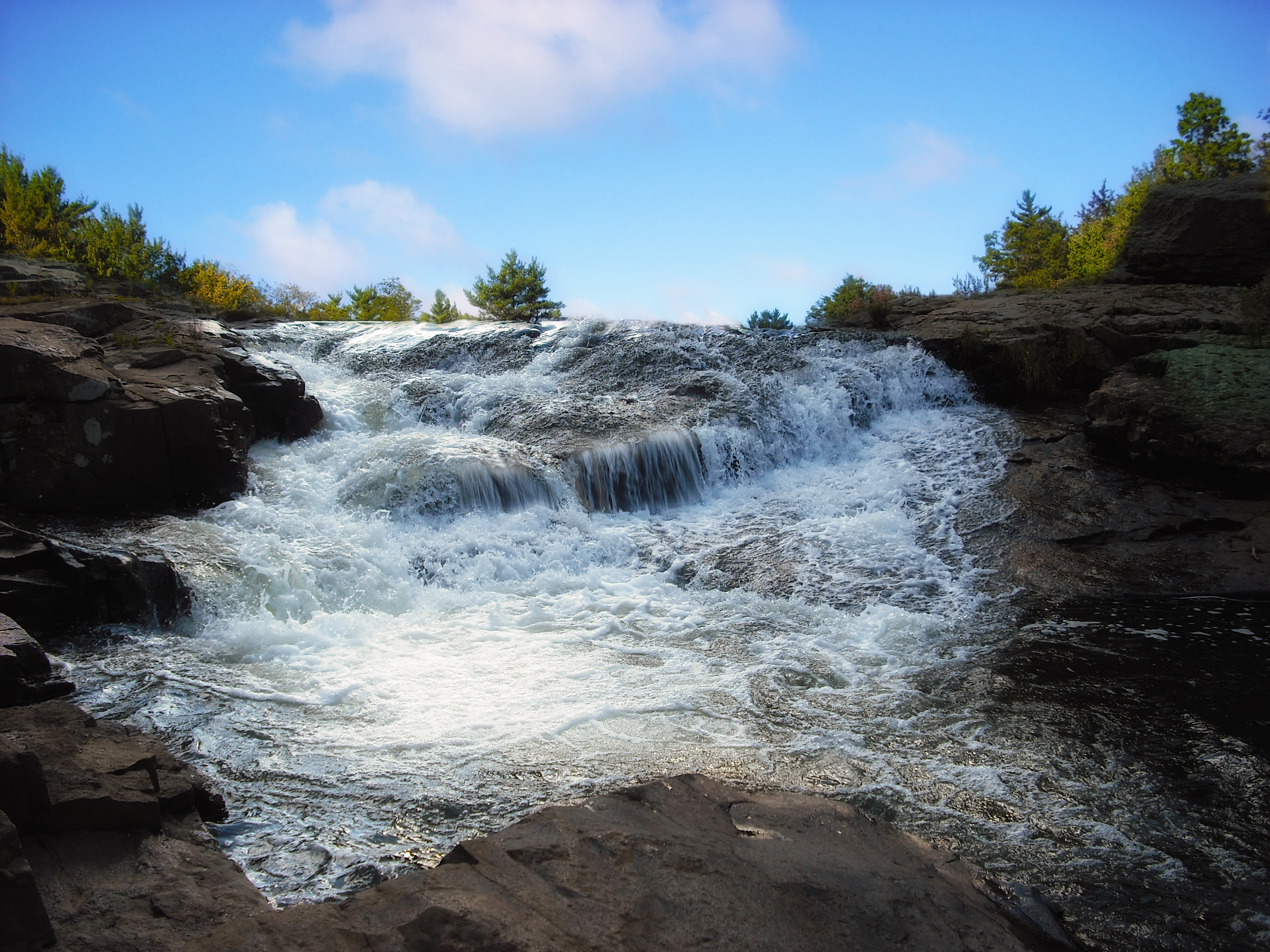
- Tobyhanna Falls

- Seal
- Etymology: American Indian for "a stream whose banks are fringed with alder"

- Location of Pennsylvania in the United States
- Coordinates: 41°07′28″N 75°37′34″W
- Country: United States
- State: Pennsylvania
- County: Monroe
- Established: 1830

Area
  - Total: 52.59 sq mi (136.21 km^{2})
  - Land: 50.19 sq mi (129.99 km^{2})
  - Water: 2.40 sq mi (6.21 km^{2})
- Elevation: 1,568 ft (478 m)

Population (2020)
  - Total: 8,290 ▼
  - Estimate (2021): 8,354
  - Density: 167.4/sq mi (64.64/km^{2})
- Time zone: UTC-5 (EST)
  - Summer (DST): UTC-4 (EDT)
- ZIP code: 18610, 18347, 18348, 18349, 18350, 18346, 18334
- Area code(s): 570
- FIPS code: 42-089-76960
- Website: tobyhannatownshippa.gov

Tobyhanna Township is a township in Monroe County, Pennsylvania, United States. The population was 8,290 at the 2020 census. Tobyhanna Township includes the Tobyhanna Elementary Center and Locust Lake Village.

== Geography ==
According to the United States Census Bureau, the township has a total area of 52.6 square miles (136.2 km^{2}), of which 50.2 square miles (130 km^{2}) is land and 2.4 square miles (6 km^{2}) (4.56%) is water.

The township is included in the Stroudsburg Combined Metropolitan Statistical Area, which is part of the greater New York, Newark, NY-NJ-CT-PA Combined Statistical Area.

Tobyhanna is approximately 25 miles west of Stroudsburg and approximately 101 miles distant from New York City.

Tobyhanna Township borders Luzerne, Lackawanna, and Carbon counties.

=== Adjacent municipalities ===
- Coolbaugh Township (North)
- Borough of Mount Pocono (Northeast)
- Pocono Township, Monroe County (East)
- Tunkhannock Township, Monroe County (South)
- Kidder Township, Carbon County (Southwest)
- Buck Township, Luzerne County (Northwest)

=== Neighborhoods ===
Tobyhanna Township has 22 private communities that contain the majority of homes:

- Arrowhead Lake
- Blakeslee Estates
- Camelot Forest
- Campstead
- Emerald Lakes
- Estates at Emerald Lakes
- Fawn Ridge Estates
- Forest Glen
- Greenwood Acres
- Harvest Acres
- Keswick Pointe
- Lake Naomi/Timber Trails
- Locust Lake Village
- Locust Paradise
- Old Farm Estates
- Pinecrest Development
- Pocohanna Cabin Colony
- Pocono Lake Preserve
- Pocono Pines
- Stillwater Lake Civic Association
- Stillwater Lake Estates
- Timber Lake Estates
- Wagner Forest

== Transportation ==
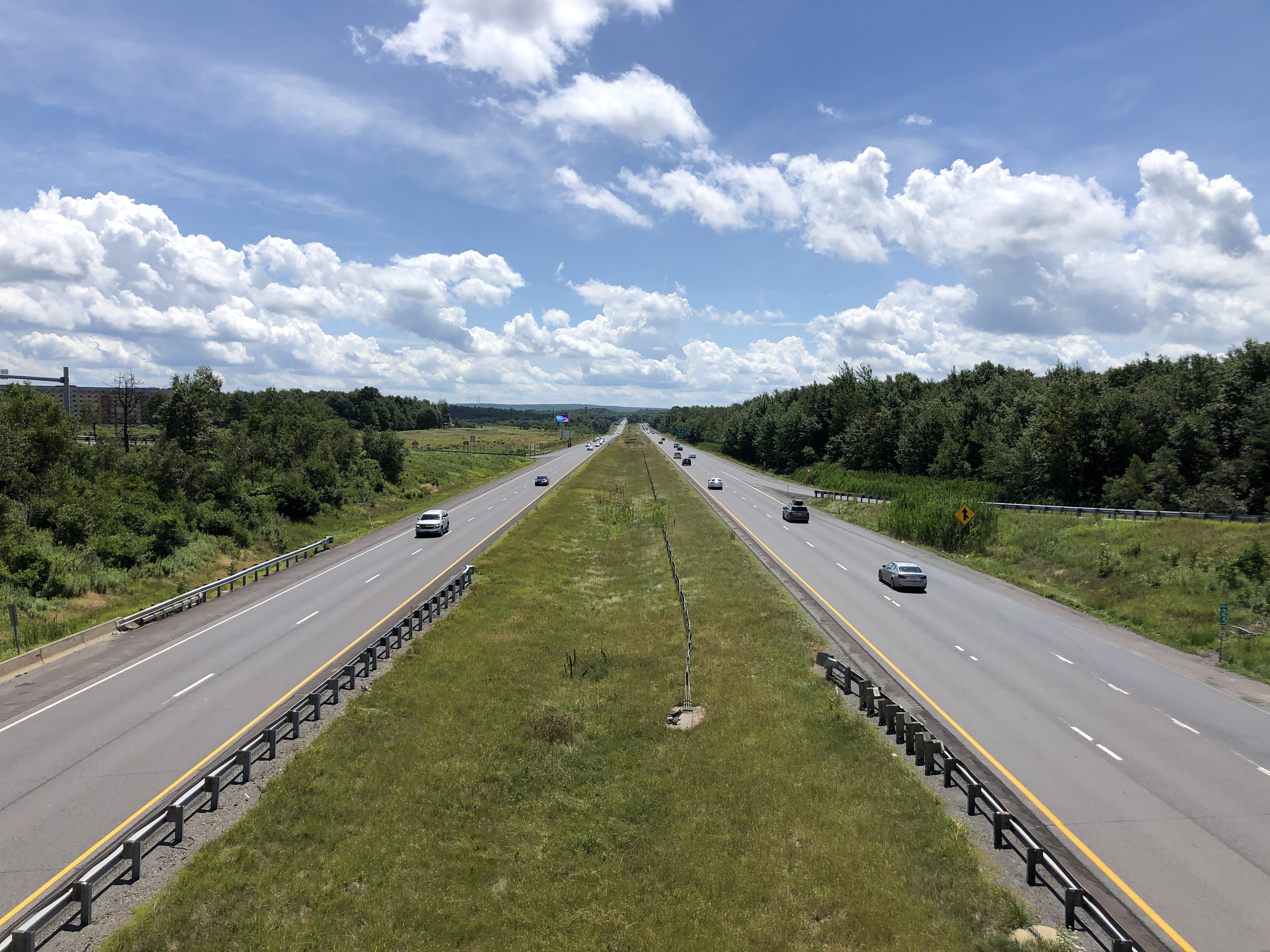
I-380 southbound in Tobyhanna Township

As of 2018, there were 88.68 miles (142.72 km) of public roads in Tobyhanna Township, of which 38.62 miles (62.15 km) were maintained by the Pennsylvania Department of Transportation (PennDOT) and 50.06 miles (80.56 km) were maintained by the township.

Interstate 80 and Interstate 380 are the main highways serving Tobyhanna Township. I-80 follows the Keystone Shortway along an east-west alignment across the southwestern portion of the township. I-380 follows a north-south alignment across the eastern portion of the township. Other numbered highways serving Tobyhanna Township include Pennsylvania Route 115, Pennsylvania Route 314, Pennsylvania Route 423 and Pennsylvania Route 940. PA 940 follows an east-west alignment through the middle of the township. PA 423 begins at PA 940 and heads north in the northeastern portion of the township. PA 314 begins at PA 940 and heads southeast near the eastern edge of the township. Finally, PA 115 follows a southeast-northwest alignment across the southwestern portion of the township.

== History ==
Tobyhanna is derived from an American Indian word meaning "a stream whose banks are fringed with alder", i.e. the Tobyhanna Creek. Legally, Tobyhanna Township was incorporated from Coolbaugh Township in 1830. Surprisingly, the town of Tobyhanna, Tobyhanna Lake, the Tobyhanna Army Depot, and the Tobyhanna State Park are all located well within the boundaries of Coolbaugh Township, which adjoins Tobyhanna Township on the north.

The Pocono Manor Historic District was listed on the National Register of Historic Places in 1997.

=== The building of Sullivan Trail ===
On May 15–6, 1779, Van Cortlandt's 2nd New York Regiment, Spencer's 5th New Jersey Regiment, and Cilly's 1st New Hampshire Regiment arrived at Learns Tavern in Tannersville and began construction on the trail on May 17. Originally a mountain path, the road was under construction as a military road to assist with moving troops through the area for the Sullivan Expedition. The builders reached the Hungry Hill area on May 23, Tobyhanna Creek on the 24th, Locust Hill (now Locust Ridge) on May 30, and established Camp Fatigue on June 7. The road to the Wyoming Valley (Scran/Wilkes-Barre area) was completed on June 15.

=== The Battle of Locust Ridge, 1784 ===
In 1754, settlers from Connecticut (Yankees) claimed land in the Wyoming Valley, now the Scranton/Wilkes-Barre area. The Charter of 1662 of King Charles II of England reads, "We, of Our abundant Grace, . . . have given, granted, and confirmed. . . unto the said Governor and Company. . . all that Part of Our Dominions in New-England . . . bounded on the East by . . . Narraganset-Bay, . . . on the North by the Line of the Massachusetts-Plantation; and on the South by the Sea; and in Longitude . . . From the said Narraganset-Bay on the East, to the South Sea on the West Part . . .". The South Sea is now called the Pacific Ocean. Thus, settlers in Connecticut felt they had claim to the land. Pennsylvania settlers (Pennamites) laid claim to the same land by right of a royal charter. Thirdly, the Iroquois claimed the land as theirs, as they had been living there before either group of settlers arrived. Unrest was largely minimal until 1769, when Connecticut established its first permanent settlement. The resulting conflicts were eventually dubbed the Pennamite–Yankee War.

The third Yankee-Pennamite War lasted from 1784 to 1794. In July 1784, Pennsylvania's Supreme Executive Council raised a militia to combat the Yankee occupations. Locust Hill, now known as Locust Ridge, was the site of an engagement on August 2, 1784, between Pennamite troops under the command of Colonel John Armstrong and Yankee troops under the command of Captain John Swift. Swift's men surrendered on August 8. Only one person died during the Battle of Locust Ridge, a man by the name of Jacob Everett.

=== Industry in the 19th and 20th centuries ===
From 1896 through the 1940s, one large industry in the township was ice harvesting. Ice was harvest from Lake Naomi, Pocono Lake, Stillwater Lake, Anglewood Lake, and Brady's Lake. The ice was stored in icehouses and transported by the Wilkes-Barre and Eastern Railroad to major cities.

Another large industry was logging and lumbering. Charles Hauser built a sawmill in 1848, and Isaac Stauffer followed in 1863. Stauffer eventually purchased Hauser's operation, and through the accumulation of 4,500 acres of land, became known as the "King of the Poconos."

== Demographics ==
Historical population
| Census | Pop. | Note | %± |
|---|---|---|---|
| 1830 | 274 | | — |
| 1840 | 595 | | 117.2% |
| 1850 | 550 | | −7.6% |
| 1860 | 518 | | −5.8% |
| 1870 | 477 | | −7.9% |
| 1880 | 835 | | 75.1% |
| 1900 | 654 | | — |
| 1980 | 3,262 | | — |
| 1990 | 4,318 | | 32.4% |
| 2000 | 6,152 | | 42.5% |
| 2010 | 8,554 | | 39.0% |
| 2020 | 8,290 | | −3.1% |
| 2021 (est.) | 8,354 | | 0.8% |
U.S. Decennial Census

As of the census of 2010, there were 8,554 people, 3,433 households, and 2,450 families residing in the township. The population density was 170.4 inhabitants per square mile (65.8/km^{2}). There were 7,347 housing units at an average density of 146.4 per square mile (56.5/km^{2}). The racial makeup of the township was 81.8% White, 10% African American, 0.5% Native American, 1.4% Asian, 0.1% Pacific Islander, 4.1% from other races, and 2.2% from two or more races. Hispanic or Latino of any race were 11.8% of the population.

There were 3,433 households, out of which 26.4% had children under the age of 18 living with them, 56.9% were married couples living together, 9.8% had a female householder with no husband present, and 28.6% were non-families. 22.8% of all households were made up of individuals, and 8.2% had someone living alone who was 65 years of age or older. The average household size was 2.49 and the average family size was 2.92.

In the township the population was spread out, with 20.7% under the age of 18, 61.8% from 18 to 64, and 17.5% who were 65 years of age or older. The median age was 45.3 years.

The median income for a household in the township was $47,760, and the median income for a family was $54,247. Males had a median income of $46,954 versus $25,672 for females. The per capita income for the township was $23,109. About 16.1% of families and 12.3% of the population were below the poverty line, including 22.4% of those under age 18 and 8.4% of those age 65 or over.

== Government ==
Tobyhanna Township was incorporated in 1830 as a Pennsylvania Second Class Township and is governed under a council-manager form of government. As of the Reorganizational Meeting on January 2, 2018, elected supervisors are Anne Lamberton as Chairperson, John J. Holahan III as Vice Chairperson, and Heidi M. Pickard, MS, Brendon J. E. Carroll, and David Carbone are members. The daily operations of the township are managed by Interim Township Manager Autumn Canfield, MA. The board meets on the first Wednesday of every month at 8:30 AM for a work session, and on the third Tuesday of every month at 6:00 PM for a regular business meeting.

United States presidential election results for Tobyhanna Township, Pennsylvania
| Year | Republican | | Democratic | | Third party(ies) | |
| Year | No. | % | No. | % | No. | % |
|---|---|---|---|---|---|---|
| 2024 | 2,197 | 49.77% | 2,190 | 49.61% | 27 | 0.61% |
| 2020 | 2,028 | 47.36% | 2,210 | 51.61% | 44 | 1.03% |
| 2016 | 1,872 | 51.96% | 1,621 | 44.99% | 110 | 3.05% |
| 2012 | 1,632 | 48.40% | 1,689 | 50.09% | 51 | 1.51% |
| 2008 | 1,677 | 46.35% | 1,895 | 52.38% | 46 | 1.27% |
| 2004 | 1,750 | 55.63% | 1,371 | 43.58% | 25 | 0.79% |
| 2000 | 1,411 | 53.67% | 1,139 | 43.32% | 79 | 3.00% |

== Education ==
=== Public School Districts ===
Tobyhanna Township is part of the Pocono Mountain School District. The Township contains the Tobyhanna Elementary Center and Pocono Mountain West High School.

=== Clymer Library ===
The Clymer Library was established in 1906. The library's current location is the old Tobyhanna Township Volunteer Fire Company building, which was remodeled to suit the library. Operating from its current location since 1982, the library currently stocks over 47,000 books and over 2,500 cassettes and DVDs.

== Emergency services ==
=== Tobyhanna Township Volunteer Fire Company (TTVFC) ===
Tobyhanna Township Volunteer Fire Company (TTVFC) was chartered as the Pocono Pines Fire Company in 1930. On February 25, 1954, the Tobyhanna Township Board of Supervisors passed a resolution designating TTVFC as an official fire protection service for the township This resolution also allocated any money received through the Fire Insurance Tax Fund to the fire company.

=== Pocono Mountain Volunteer Fire Company (PMVFC) ===
Pocono Mountain Volunteer Fire Company (PMVFC) was chartered in 1925, and has provided fire protection services for the Borough of Mount Pocono and Paradise Township since then. As of 2017, Pocono Mountain became a provider for Tobyhanna Township.

=== Pocono Mountain Regional Police Department ===
Pocono Mountain Regional Police Department (PMRPD) was chartered in 1994, when Mount Pocono and Tobyhanna Township's police departments merged. PMRPD employs 38 officers under the direction of Police Chief is Chris Wagner.

=== Pocono Mountain Regional Emergency Services ===
Pocono Mountain Regional Emergency Services (PMREMS) services Tobyhanna Township and other surrounding townships. According to their annual report, given to the Board of Supervisors on January 16, 2018, Pocono Mountain Regional received a total of 6,207 calls for the 2017 year, 1,322 of which were located in Tobyhanna Township.

== Culture ==
=== Media ===
The Pocono Mountains has local television stations that service the area:

- WNEP-TV ABC affiliate
- WBRE-TV NBC affiliate
- WYOU-TV CBS affiliate
- WVIA-TV PBS affiliate
- WOLF-TV FOX affiliate

Radio stations that service the area include:

- WABT "Pocono 96.7" is licensed to Lehman Township in Pike County.
- WESS at (90.3 FM) broadcasts from East Stroudsburg University. University students and faculty provide programming and DJing, and the station rebroadcasts BBC World Service when not in use by the university.
- WSBG (93.5 FM) is licensed to Stroudsburg. The station's slogan is "The Poconos' Best Variety."
- WKRZ (107.9 FM) WKRF simulcasts WKRZ broadcasting Pop music.
- WVIA (89.9 FM) NPR Member Station broadcast from the Wyoming Valley. Arts and information station.

The township has two local newspapers:

- The Pocono Record is a newspaper based in Stroudsburg.
- The Journal of the Pocono Plateau is a newspaper based in White Haven. The paper also prints the Journal-Herald, and the Journal of Penn-Kidder.

Tobyhanna Township is the setting of comedian Conner O'Malley's 2024 short film Rap World.

=== Sports ===
While there are no teams local to the boundaries of the township, The Scranton/Wilkes-Barre RailRiders are based 40 minutes away, who are the Triple-A affiliate of the New York Yankees.

=== Landmarks and attractions ===
Many of Tobyhanna Township's attractions celebrate the history of the area as a coal and lumber area, while other facets of the township promote tourism.

The Marker Advocates of Tobyhanna Township (MATT) was founded on May 19, 2015 by a group of volunteers. The nonprofit organization created a map with 24 sites of historical importance, with each site delineated by a green marker pole.

Kalahari Resorts is located just off of I-380 and SR 940. The indoor water park in the Pocono Mountains is the largest in the United States, at 220,000 square feet. The resort opened in 2015, and consists of a 220,000-square-foot (20,000 m^{2}) indoor water park, an outdoor water park, 230,000-square-foot (21,000 m^{2}) convention center and 977 guest rooms.

== Recreation and landmarks ==
=== Austin T. Blakeslee Natural Area ===
Originally named Harrison Park, the area was destroyed by a flood in 1955, caused when Hurricane Connie and Hurricane Diane hit the area in early August. Renamed Austin T. Blakeslee Natural Area, the park has approximately 130 acres of protected land. Three trails span 2.59 miles of hiking areas. Creek Trail, the longest path at 1.14 miles, follows the northern bank of Tobyhanna Creek and leads to Tobyhanna Falls.

=== Blanche D. Price Memorial Park ===
Blanche D. Price Memorial Park was created in the early 20th century. The park contains two lodges, a playground, two baseball fields, a basketball court, and a pool (closed for repairs). The area has grit walking paths. It was originally part of Pine Tree Camp, but was given to the township in the early 20th century. The main lodge was renovated in 2006.

=== Eschenbach Cemetery ===
The Eschenbach Cemetery was established between 1810–1830 as a private family cemetery. Andrew Eschenbach, Jr., born on December 25, 1745, to Andreas Eschenbach and Johanna Catharina Muntz, was one of the first permanent settlers in Tobyhanna Township. He and his wife, Susan Fink, moved to Tobyhanna Township in 1809. They had 10 children between 1780 and 1810, and had a large enough family that a cemetery became a necessity, as the infrastructure of the township was not sufficiently developed.

It is possible that the location of the Eschenbach Cemetery was determined by an existing grave site. The Battle of Locust Ridge took place on August 2, 1784, as part of the Yankee-Pennamite Wars between Pennsylvania and Connecticut. Jacob Everett (of Pennsylvania) was the only person to lose his life in the battle. Although lacking firm documentation, lore handed down through generations suggests he is buried in what later became the Eschenbach Cemetery.

The Eschenbach Cemetery headstones are local field stone and slate, which means the etchings have since worn away from natural weathering. While the location of who is buried at what grave site may forever be a mystery, it is known that the cemetery was the final resting place for Andrew and Susan.

=== Hungry Hill Memorial ===
The Hungry Hill memorial is a Revolutionary War memorial and grave site of an unknown soldier. Van Cortlandt's 2nd New York and Spencer's 5th New Jersey regiments camped nearby while they changed a wilderness trail into a military road. This path, known now as Sullivan Trail, paved the way for the Sullivan Expedition in 1779. General John Sullivan and Brigadier General James Clinton, who led the expedition, pushed through the area known as the Great Swamp, as they pursued a scorched earth campaign against the Iroquois. Today, the path of the original Sullivan Road within Tobyhanna Township is virtually intact.

=== Keiper Park ===
Keiper Park is located in the center of Tobyhanna Township. The park contains a softball field, concession stand, and a playground. The area is largely grassy fields.

=== Thomas Darling Preserve ===
Thomas Darling Preserve was named after Wilkes-Barre naturalist Thomas Darling Jr. The area covers of over 2,500 acres of land, featuring one of the state's largest spruce forests. Two Mile Run is a tributary of Tobyhanna Creek, and runs through the preserve. The trail, a 2.2-mile loop, is marked with blue blazes.

== Climate ==
According to the Trewartha climate classification system, Tobyhanna Township has a Temperate continental climate (Dc) with warm summers (b), cold winters (o) and year-around precipitation (Dcbo). Dcbo climates are characterized by at least one month having an average mean temperature ≤ 32.0 °F (0.0 °C), four to seven months with an average mean temperature ≥ 50.0 °F (10.0 °C), all months with an average mean temperature < 72.0 °F (22.2 °C) and no significant precipitation difference between seasons. Although most summer days are comfortably humid in Tobyhanna Township, episodes of heat and high humidity can occur with heat index values > 94 °F (34 °C). Since 1981, the highest air temperature was 94.1 °F (34.5 °C) on July 22, 2011, and the highest daily average mean dew point was 69.9 °F (21.1 °C) on August 1, 2006. July is the peak month for thunderstorm activity, which correlates with the average warmest month of the year. Since 1981, the wettest calendar day was 7.32 inches (186 mm) on September 30, 2010. During the winter months, the plant hardiness zone is 5b, with an average annual extreme minimum air temperature of −14.2 °F (−25.7 °C). Since 1981, the coldest air temperature was −23.7 °F (−30.9 °C) on January 21, 1994. Episodes of extreme cold and wind can occur with wind chill values < −27 °F (−33 °C). The average snowiest month is January which correlates with the average coldest month of the year. Ice storms and large snowstorms depositing ≥ 12 inches (30 cm) of snow occur nearly every year, particularly during nor'easters from December through March.

Climate data for Tobyhanna Twp, Elevation 1,650 ft (503 m), 1981–2010 normals, extremes 1981–2018
| Month | Jan | Feb | Mar | Apr | May | Jun | Jul | Aug | Sep | Oct | Nov | Dec | Year |
|---|---|---|---|---|---|---|---|---|---|---|---|---|---|
| Record high °F (°C) | 61.6 (16.4) | 72.2 (22.3) | 81.4 (27.4) | 87.6 (30.9) | 89.7 (32.1) | 89.1 (31.7) | 94.1 (34.5) | 92.7 (33.7) | 89.1 (31.7) | 82.8 (28.2) | 74.5 (23.6) | 66.1 (18.9) | 94.1 (34.5) |
| Mean daily maximum °F (°C) | 31.2 (−0.4) | 34.9 (1.6) | 43.3 (6.3) | 56.1 (13.4) | 67.1 (19.5) | 75.0 (23.9) | 79.2 (26.2) | 77.6 (25.3) | 70.5 (21.4) | 58.8 (14.9) | 47.7 (8.7) | 35.6 (2.0) | 56.5 (13.6) |
| Daily mean °F (°C) | 22.4 (−5.3) | 25.4 (−3.7) | 33.2 (0.7) | 44.8 (7.1) | 55.3 (12.9) | 63.6 (17.6) | 68.0 (20.0) | 66.5 (19.2) | 59.3 (15.2) | 47.8 (8.8) | 38.6 (3.7) | 27.6 (−2.4) | 46.1 (7.8) |
| Mean daily minimum °F (°C) | 13.7 (−10.2) | 16.0 (−8.9) | 23.1 (−4.9) | 33.5 (0.8) | 43.5 (6.4) | 52.3 (11.3) | 56.8 (13.8) | 55.4 (13.0) | 48.1 (8.9) | 36.8 (2.7) | 29.5 (−1.4) | 19.6 (−6.9) | 35.8 (2.1) |
| Record low °F (°C) | −23.7 (−30.9) | −14.1 (−25.6) | −7.6 (−22.0) | 9.2 (−12.7) | 26.7 (−2.9) | 31.9 (−0.1) | 37.1 (2.8) | 33.0 (0.6) | 26.5 (−3.1) | 15.3 (−9.3) | −1.7 (−18.7) | −15.5 (−26.4) | −23.7 (−30.9) |
| Average precipitation inches (mm) | 3.77 (96) | 3.15 (80) | 4.21 (107) | 4.60 (117) | 4.74 (120) | 5.20 (132) | 4.71 (120) | 4.08 (104) | 5.15 (131) | 4.96 (126) | 4.42 (112) | 4.28 (109) | 53.27 (1,353) |
| Average snowfall inches (cm) | 18.3 (46) | 13.2 (34) | 13.7 (35) | 3.3 (8.4) | 0.0 (0.0) | 0.0 (0.0) | 0.0 (0.0) | 0.0 (0.0) | 0.0 (0.0) | 0.1 (0.25) | 3.5 (8.9) | 11.0 (28) | 63.0 (160) |
| Average relative humidity (%) | 74.1 | 68.6 | 63.9 | 59.9 | 62.7 | 71.5 | 71.4 | 74.4 | 75.1 | 72.0 | 71.0 | 74.0 | 69.9 |
| Average dew point °F (°C) | 15.4 (−9.2) | 16.5 (−8.6) | 22.3 (−5.4) | 31.7 (−0.2) | 42.8 (6.0) | 54.2 (12.3) | 58.4 (14.7) | 58.1 (14.5) | 51.4 (10.8) | 39.2 (4.0) | 30.0 (−1.1) | 20.4 (−6.4) | 36.8 (2.7) |
Source: PRISM

== Ecology ==
According to the A. W. Kuchler U.S. potential natural vegetation types, Tobyhanna Township would have a dominant vegetation type of Northern Hardwood (106) with a dominant vegetation form of Northern hardwood forest (26). The peak spring bloom typically occurs in early-May and peak fall color usually occurs in early-October. The plant hardiness zone is 5b with an average annual extreme minimum air temperature of −14.2 °F (−25.7 °C).

== Notable person ==
- William Henry Christman, member of the Union Army during the American Civil War, the first person buried in Arlington National Cemetery, on May 13, 1864.
