= Coolbaugh Township, Pennsylvania =

Township in Pennsylvania, US

Coolbaugh Township
- Township
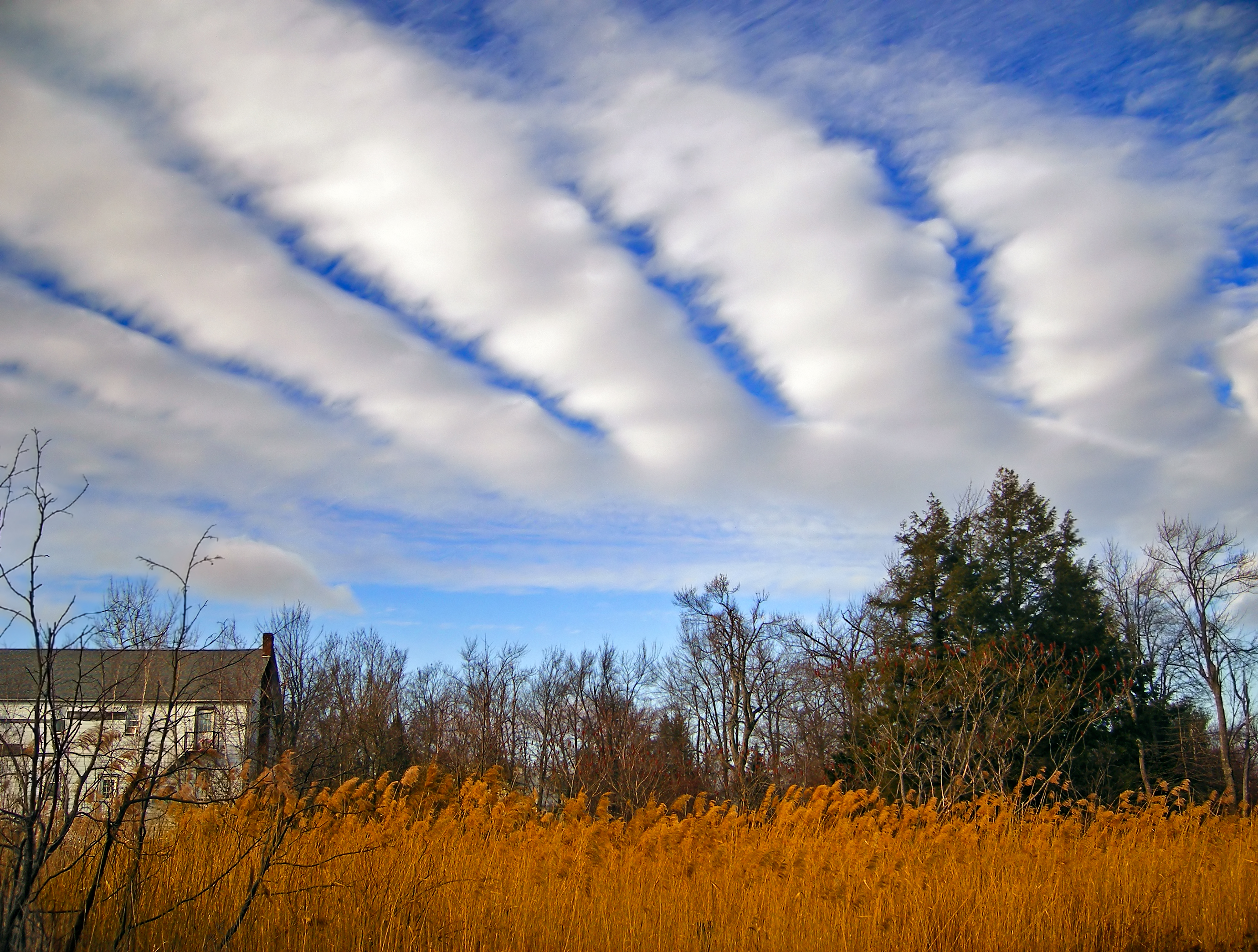
- Coolbaugh Township on a winter day

- Flag Seal

- Location of Pennsylvania in the United States
- Coordinates: 41°12′00″N 75°31′59″W
- Country: United States
- State: Pennsylvania
- County: Monroe

Area
  - Total: 87.87 sq mi (227.59 km^{2})
  - Land: 86.10 sq mi (223.00 km^{2})
  - Water: 1.77 sq mi (4.59 km^{2})
- Elevation: 1,739 ft (530 m)

Population (2020)
  - Total: 20,805 ▲
  - Estimate (2021): 20,863
  - Density: 234.7/sq mi (90.63/km^{2})
- Time zone: UTC-5 (EST)
  - Summer (DST): UTC-4 (EDT)
- Area code: 570
- FIPS code: 42-089-15960
- Website: www.coolbaughtwp.org

Coolbaugh Township is a township in Monroe County, Pennsylvania, United States. The population was 20,805 at the 2020 census. Tobyhanna State Park is in Coolbaugh Township. Tobyhanna, an unincorporated community, is also located in Coolbaugh Township rather than Tobyhanna Township.

== Geography ==
According to the United States Census Bureau, the township has a total area of 88.0 square miles (228 km^{2}), of which 86.2 square miles (223 km^{2}) is land and 1.8 square miles (4.7 km^{2}) (2.05%) is water. It contains part of the census-designated place of Gouldsboro.

== Demographics ==
Historical population
Census	Pop.	Note	%±
2000	15,205		—
2010	20,564		35.2%
2020	20,805		1.2%
2021 (est.)	20,863		0.3%
U.S. Decennial Census

=== 2010 Census Data ===
At the 2010 census there were 20,564 people, 6,969 households, and 5,362 families living in the township. The population density was 238.6 inhabitants per square mile (92.1/km^{2}). There were 11,163 housing units at an average density of 129.5 per square mile (50.0/km^{2}). The racial makeup of the township was 56.4% White, 27.8% African American, 0.7% Native American, 1.8% Asian, 0.1% Pacific Islander, 8.6% from other races, and 4.6% from two or more races. Hispanic or Latino of any race were 23.3%.

There were 6,969 households, 37.6% had children under the age of 18 living with them, 54.3% were married couples living together, 16.6% had a female householder with no husband present, and 23.1% were non-families. 18.5% of households were made up of individuals, and 6.1% were one person aged 65 or older. The average household size was 2.95 and the average family size was 3.35.

The age distribution was 28.5% under the age of 18, 61.3% from 18 to 64, and 10.2% 65 or older. The median age was 37.4 years.

The median household income was $54,339 and the median family income was $59,139. Males had a median income of $42,813 versus $32,256 for females. The per capita income for the township was $19,816. About 15.1% of families and 17.2% of the population were below the poverty line, including 26.1% of those under age 18 and 4.8% of those age 65 or over.

=== 2000 Census Data ===
At the 2000 census there were 15,205 people, 5,101 households, and 4,050 families living in the township. The population density was 177.3 inhabitants per square mile (68.5/km^{2}). There were 9,376 housing units at an average density of 109.4 per square mile (42.2/km^{2}). The racial makeup of the township was 71.58% White, 15.68% African American, 0.28% Native American, 1.01% Asian, 0.07% Pacific Islander, 7.34% from other races, and 4.04% from two or more races. Hispanic or Latino of any race were 15.30%.

There were 5,101 households, 42.2% had children under the age of 18 living with them, 63.1% were married couples living together, 11.1% had a female householder with no husband present, and 20.6% were non-families. 16.3% of households were made up of individuals, and 5.8% were one person aged 65 or older. The average household size was 2.98 and the average family size was 3.34.

The age distribution was 31.6% under the age of 18, 7.0% from 18 to 24, 28.4% from 25 to 44, 22.4% from 45 to 64, and 10.5% 65 or older. The median age was 36 years. For every 100 females, there were 97.7 males. For every 100 females age 18 and over, there were 93.5 males.

The median household income was $46,684 and the median family income was $50,499. Males had a median income of $40,155 versus $22,592 for females. The per capita income for the township was $17,094. About 8.4% of families and 11.8% of the population were below the poverty line, including 15.0% of those under age 18 and 14.2% of those age 65 or over.

United States presidential election results for Coolbaugh Township, Pennsylvania
Year	Republican		Democratic		Third party(ies)	
Year	No.	%	No.	%	No.	%
2024	3,163	38.05%	5,101	61.37%	48	0.58%
2020	2,879	34.30%	5,434	64.74%	80	0.95%
2016	2,422	34.96%	4,293	61.97%	213	3.07%
2012	1,894	29.38%	4,492	69.69%	60	0.93%
2008	2,167	31.33%	4,697	67.91%	53	0.77%
2004	2,243	42.24%	3,017	56.82%	50	0.94%
2000	1,784	42.99%	2,230	53.73%	136	3.28%

== Climate ==
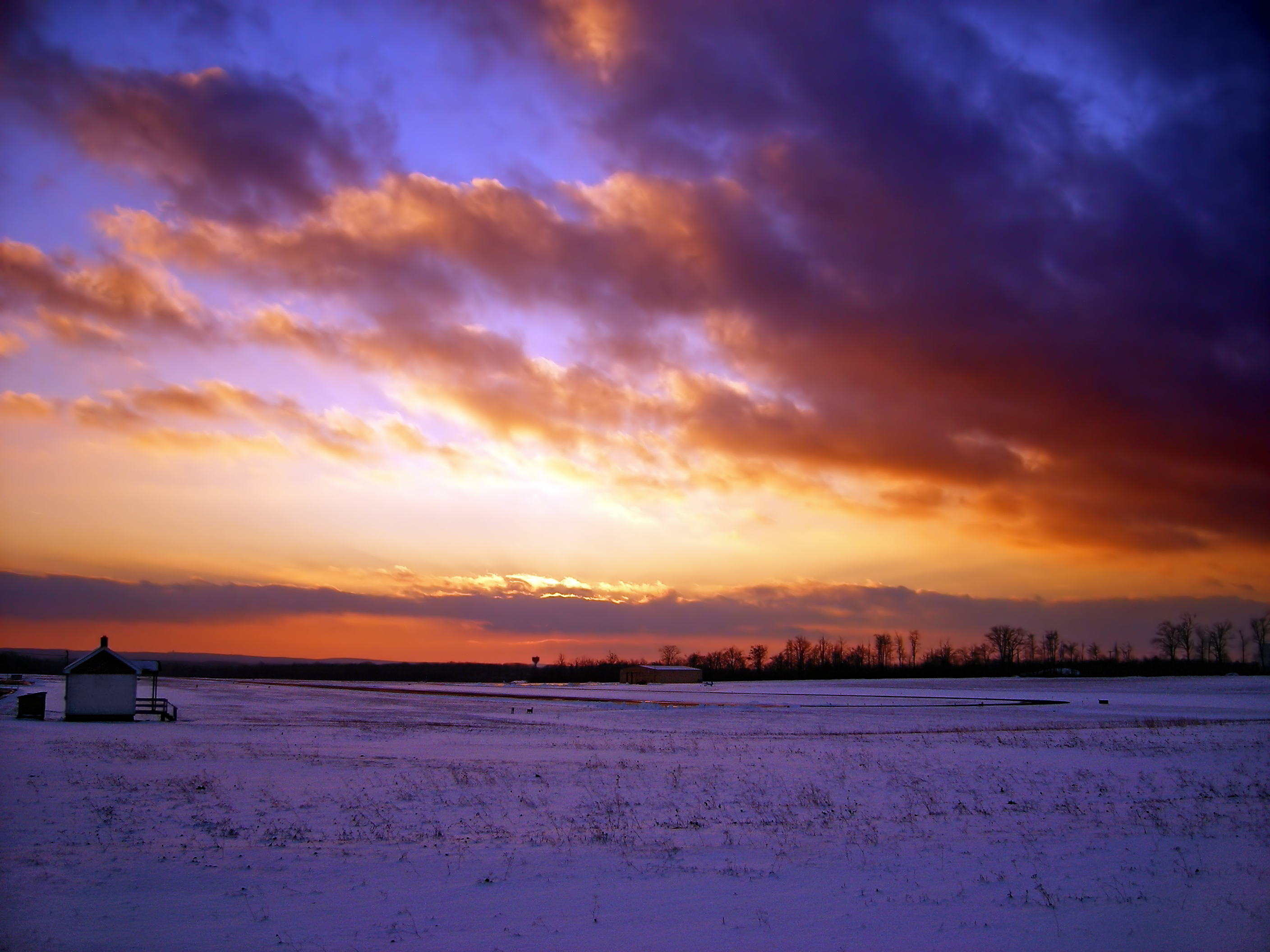
Coolbaugh Township in December 2007

According to the Köppen climate classification system, Coolbaugh Township has a Warm-summer Humid continental climate (Dfb).

Climate data for Coolbaugh Twp (41.1838, -75.4386), elevation 1,939 ft (591 m), 1991-2020 normals, extremes 1981-2024
Month	Jan	Feb	Mar	Apr	May	Jun	Jul	Aug	Sep	Oct	Nov	Dec	Year
Record high °F (°C)	60.8 (16.0)	71.1 (21.7)	81.1 (27.3)	86.5 (30.3)	88.4 (31.3)	89.8 (32.1)	93.6 (34.2)	91.8 (33.2)	87.7 (30.9)	80.8 (27.1)	75.2 (24.0)	66.4 (19.1)	93.6 (34.2)
Mean daily maximum °F (°C)	31.1 (−0.5)	33.5 (0.8)	41.5 (5.3)	54.8 (12.7)	65.7 (18.7)	73.6 (23.1)	78.3 (25.7)	76.5 (24.7)	69.8 (21.0)	57.8 (14.3)	46.2 (7.9)	35.8 (2.1)	55.5 (13.1)
Daily mean °F (°C)	23.4 (−4.8)	25.2 (−3.8)	32.7 (0.4)	44.8 (7.1)	55.4 (13.0)	63.7 (17.6)	68.5 (20.3)	66.8 (19.3)	60.1 (15.6)	48.7 (9.3)	38.1 (3.4)	28.8 (−1.8)	46.4 (8.0)
Mean daily minimum °F (°C)	15.7 (−9.1)	17.0 (−8.3)	23.9 (−4.5)	34.8 (1.6)	45.0 (7.2)	53.7 (12.1)	58.7 (14.8)	57.1 (13.9)	50.4 (10.2)	39.6 (4.2)	30.0 (−1.1)	21.8 (−5.7)	37.4 (3.0)
Record low °F (°C)	−20.3 (−29.1)	−16.8 (−27.1)	−10.4 (−23.6)	7.8 (−13.4)	22.7 (−5.2)	30.0 (−1.1)	35.1 (1.7)	31.2 (−0.4)	25.8 (−3.4)	15.9 (−8.9)	−2.3 (−19.1)	−17.1 (−27.3)	−20.3 (−29.1)
Average precipitation inches (mm)	3.77 (96)	3.00 (76)	3.98 (101)	4.29 (109)	4.10 (104)	4.99 (127)	4.62 (117)	4.61 (117)	5.16 (131)	5.18 (132)	3.77 (96)	4.39 (112)	51.87 (1,317)
Average snowfall inches (cm)	11.3 (29)	15.5 (39)	8.9 (23)	1.8 (4.6)	0.0 (0.0)	0.0 (0.0)	0.0 (0.0)	0.0 (0.0)	0.0 (0.0)	2.0 (5.1)	4.1 (10)	10.3 (26)	53.8 (137)
Average dew point °F (°C)	16.4 (−8.7)	16.2 (−8.8)	22.2 (−5.4)	31.4 (−0.3)	43.7 (6.5)	54.7 (12.6)	59.1 (15.1)	58.5 (14.7)	52.6 (11.4)	41.3 (5.2)	30.0 (−1.1)	22.3 (−5.4)	37.5 (3.1)
Source 1: PRISM
Source 2: NOHRSC (Snow, 2008/2009 - 2024/2025 normals)

== Transportation ==
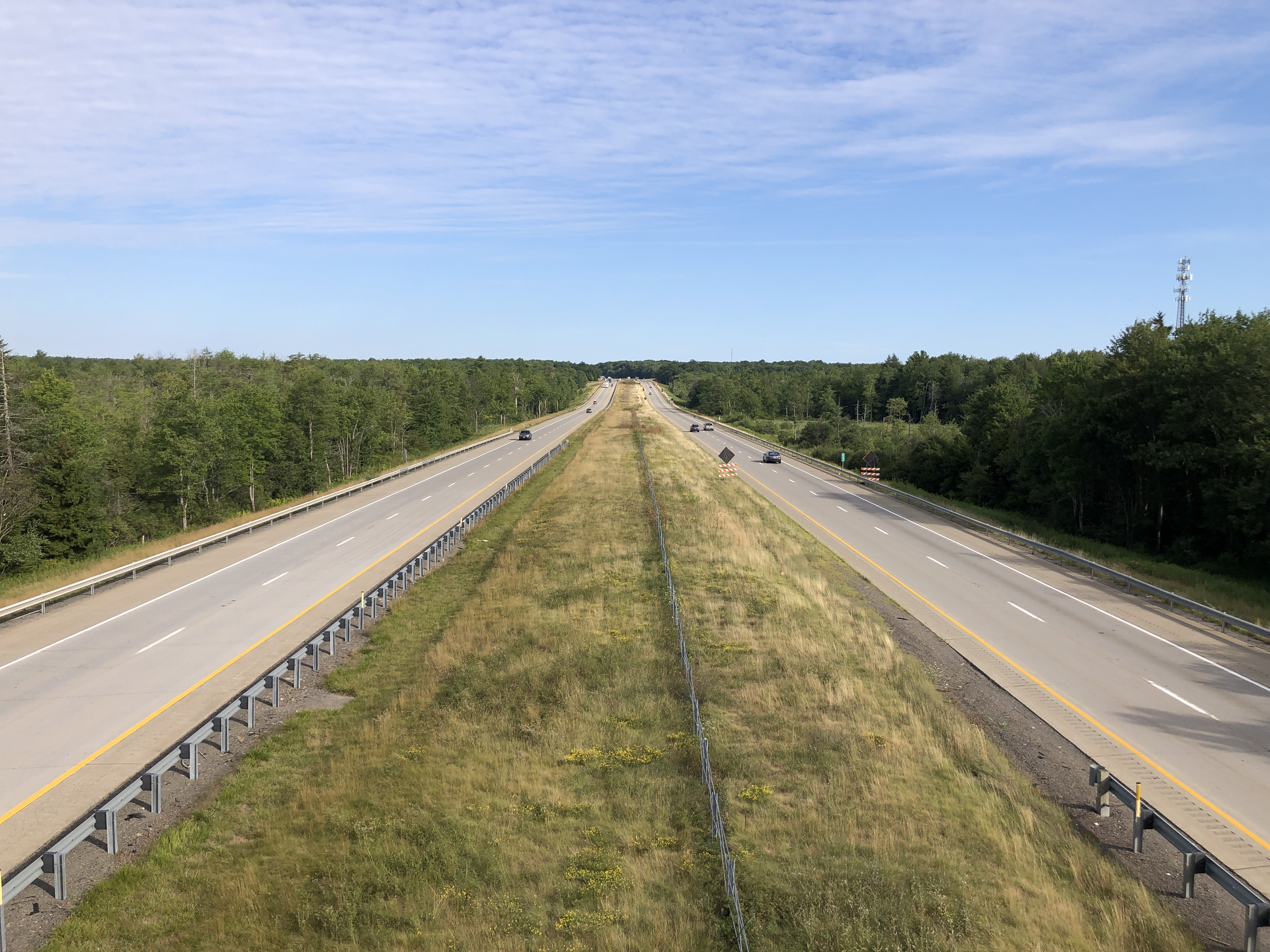
I-380 northbound in Coolbaugh Township

As of 2020, there were 109.65 miles (176.46 km) of public roads in Coolbaugh Township, of which 45.08 miles (72.55 km) were maintained by the Pennsylvania Department of Transportation (PennDOT) and 64.57 miles (103.92 km) were maintained by the township.

Interstate 380 is the most prominent highway serving Coolbaugh Township. It follows a southeast–northwest alignment through the center of the township, with interchanges for Pennsylvania Route 423/Pennsylvania Route 611 and Pennsylvania Route 435/Pennsylvania Route 507. PA 423 follows Propect Street and Church Street along a southwest–northeast alignment through the middle of the township. PA 435 begins at I-380 in the northwest corner of the township and heads northwestward. PA 507 begins at PA 435 in the northwest corner of the township and heads northeastward. PA 611 starts at I-380 in the middle of the township and heads southeastward into the southeastern portion of the township to the northeast of I-380. Other state highways serving the township include Pennsylvania Route 191, which briefly passes through the northeast corner of the township, and Pennsylvania Route 196, which follows a north–south alignment across the eastern part of the township.

Pocono Mountains Municipal Airport is located between I-380 and PA 611 in the southeastern corner of the township.

== Government and infrastructure ==
The Tobyhanna Army Depot is in the township.

== Ecology ==
According to the A. W. Kuchler U.S. potential natural vegetation types, Coolbaugh Township would have a dominant vegetation type of Northern Hardwood (106) with a dominant vegetation form of Northern hardwood forest (26). The peak spring bloom typically occurs in early-May and peak fall color usually occurs in early-October. The plant hardiness zone is 5b with an average annual extreme minimum air temperature of −14.3 °F (−26 °C).

== Education ==
The township is in the Pocono Mountain School District.
