= Pocono Mountain School District =

Public school district in Monroe County, Pennsylvania, United States

Coordinates: 41.10341°N 75.38771°W

Address
- 135 Pocono Mountain School Road, PO Box 200 Swiftwater, Pennsylvania, 18370; United States

District information
- Type: Public
- Established: 1960
- Budget: $208.8 million
- NCES District ID: 4219500

Students and staff
- Students: 8,003 (2022-23)
- Teachers: 698.2 (on an FTE basis)
- Student–teacher ratio: 11.51
- Athletic conference: Eastern Pennsylvania Conference
- District mascot: Cardinal - Panther
- Colors: Red, black, and white or Blue and silver

Other information
- Website: www.pmsd.org

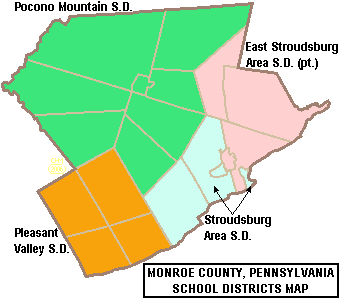
Pocono Mountain School District region in Monroe County, Pennsylvania

Pocono Mountain School District, often abbreviated PMSD for short, is a large, rural public school district located in Monroe County in Northeastern Pennsylvania.

As of the 2022–23 school year, the district had an enrollment of 8,003 students in its schools, according to National Center for Education Statistics data.

Pocono Mountain School District encompasses approximately 304 square miles (790 km^{2}) and is divided into two parts: Pocono Mountain East and Pocono Mountain West. The Pocono Mountain East attendance area includes: Jackson Township, Pocono Township, Paradise Township, Barrett Township and Mount Pocono Borough. The schools serving Pocono Mountain East are: Swiftwater Elementary Center (K-3), Swiftwater Intermediate School (4-6), Pocono Mountain East Junior High School (7-8), and Pocono Mountain East High School (9-12). It also includes a small area east of Route 380 that is Coolbaugh Township.

Pocono Mountain West attendance area includes: Tobyhanna Township, Tunkhannock Township and most of Coolbaugh Township. The schools serving Pocono Mountain West include: Tobyhanna Elementary School (K-6), Clear Run Elementary Center (K-2), Clear Run Intermediate School (3-6), Pocono Mountain West Junior High School (7-8), and Pocono Mountain West High School (9-12). According to 2000 local census data, the district serves a resident population of approximately 60,000 people.

Pocono Mountain East High School is located in Swiftwater, Pennsylvania in the heart of The Poconos. The school currently houses students in grades nine through twelve, and is joined on the campus by the East Junior High School, Swiftwater Intermediate School and the newest school Swiftwater Elementary School, built in 2008.

== Regions and constituent municipalities ==
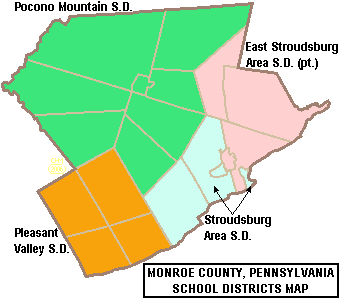
Map of school districts in Monroe County.

The district is divided into three regions, which include the following municipalities:

=== Region I ===
- Barrett Township
- Paradise Township
- Pocono Township

=== Region II ===
- Jackson Township
- Tobyhanna Township
- Tunkhannock Township

=== Region III ===
- Coolbaugh Township
- Mount Pocono Borough

== History ==
Before the need for another campus complex, one high school served the entire district. The first high school of the district—originally called Pocono Mountain High School—Pocono Mountain East High School (PMEHS) is located in Swiftwater, Pennsylvania, along with Swiftwater Elementary Center (SEC), Swiftwater Intermediate School (SIS), and Pocono Mountain East Junior High School (PMEJHS). All four schools share the same campus. Starting in the 2013–14 school year, those who attend the East campus attend SEC for grades K - 3, SIS for grades 4 - 6, PMEJHS for grades 7 - 8, and PMEHS for grades 9 - 12. Before 2008, the building that is now SEC did not exist. The current intermediate school was then the elementary school, and the junior high school was the intermediate school.

Once the district split, the West high school was built in 2002. Those who attend the West campus attend either Tobyhanna Elementary Center (TEC- Pocono Pines), Clear Run Elementary Center (CREC -Mt. Pocono), or Coolbaugh Elementary and Learning Centers (CEC/CLC -Tobyhanna). Students then all come together and attend the middle school at Clear Run Intermediate School (CRIS- Mt.Pocono) across from CREC. After spending two years there, students are then moved over to the West Junior High School on the Sullivan Trail Campus, across from the West high school. The Class of 2006 was the first graduating class to attend West for the full four years.

In May 2012, the Pocono Mountain School Board closed three schools due to sharply declining enrollment and significant budget shortfall. It closed:Coolbaugh Elementary Center, Swiftwater Intermediate, and Coolbaugh Learning Center. The closing brought the layoffs of 280 district employees, 142 of which are professional staff, which includes administrators and teachers. The Intermediate school at Clear Run opened in 1995 with The elementary Center which opened In 1997. In 2002 before the new Campus was constructed they renamed clear run schools to a better and shorter name. Swiftwater Intermediate was opened in 1998, both Intermediate Schools severed grades 6–8.

== Extracurriculars ==
The Pocono Mountain School District offers a variety of clubs, activities and an extensive sports program.

=== Mascots ===
The entire district was originally home of the Cardinals. However, when it was determined that a new school would have to be built, another squad was then needed. The Cardinals still remain at the original high school, the East high school. Barrett Elementary Center, Pocono Elementary Center, and Swiftwater Elementary Center are also Cardinals. PM West is home to the Panthers. The Cardinals are red and white, and the Panthers are blue and silver.

=== Athletics ===
Both Pocono Mountain East and Pocono Mountain West High Schools compete athletically in the Eastern Pennsylvania Conference (EPC) in the District XI division of the Pennsylvania Interscholastic Athletic Association, one of the premier high school athletic divisions in the nation.

=== Sports ===
The school districts sports include:

Pocono Mountain East High School

Boys

- Baseball - AAAAA
- Basketball- AAAA
- Cross country - AAA
- Football - AAAA
- Golf - AAA
- Soccer - AAA
- Swimming and Diving - AAA
- Tennis - AAA
- Track and Field - AAA
- Wrestling - AAA

Girls

- Basketball - AAAA
- Cross country - AAA
- Field hockey - AAA
- Soccer (Fall) - AAA
- Softball - AAAA
- Swimming and diving - AAA
- Tennis - AAA
- Track and Field - AAA
- Volleyball - AAA

Pocono Mountain West High School

Boys

- Baseball - AAAA
- Basketball- AAAA
- Cross country - AAA
- Football - AAAA
- Golf - AAA
- Soccer - AAA
- Swimming and Diving - AAA
- Tennis - AAA
- Track and field - AAA
- Wrestling - AAA

Girls

- Basketball - AAAA
- Cheerleading - AAAA
- Cross country - AAA
- Field hockey - AAA
- Soccer (Fall) - AAA
- Softball - AAAA
- Swimming and diving - AAA
- Tennis - AAA
- Track and field - AAA
- Volleyball - AAA

Pocono Mountain West Junior High School

Boys

- Baseball
- Basketball
- Cross Country
- Football
- Golf
- Soccer
- Swimming and diving
- Tennis
- Track and field
- Wrestling

Girls

- Basketball
- Cross Country
- Golf
- Field hockey
- Softball
- Swimming and diving
- Tennis
- Track and field
- Volleyball

According to PIAA directory July 2012

== Notable alumni ==
- Nellie McKay, singer, songwriter, actress, and activist
- Kelly Monaco, model and actress
