= Pocono Mountain West High School =

High school in Pennsylvania, United States

Coordinates: 41.1091°N 75.4227°W

Location
- 181 Panther Lane; Pocono Summit, (Monroe County), Pennsylvania 18346; United States

Information
- Type: Public high school
- Principal: Michael Jones
- Staff: 110.20 (FTE)
- Enrollment: 1,486 (2023-24)
- Student to teacher ratio: 13.48
- Colors: Navy, gray, and white
- Nickname: Panthers
- Website: Pocono Mountain West High School

Pocono Mountain West High School is a large, rural high school located in Pocono Summit, Pennsylvania in the Poconos region of Northeastern Pennsylvania.

Pocono Mountain West is part of the Pocono Mountain School District and opened in 2002 to accommodate the growing population of the Pocono Mountain area. As of the 2023-24 school year, the school had 1,486 students, according to National Center for Educational Statistics data.

Prior to 2002, all high school students in the district attended one school called Pocono Mountain High School. Since 2002, students in the district have been assigned to Pocono Mountain West or Pocono Mountain East based on geography. The school served 1,901 students in grades 9th through 12th. It had 114 classroom teachers in 2013.

== Athletics ==
Pocono Mountain West is one of 18 large high schools that compete in the Eastern Pennsylvania Conference, one of the nation's premier high school athletic divisions.

=== Athletic facilities ===
Pocono Mountain West's athletic facilities include one all-weather track, two baseball fields, one field hockey field, one football field, one general purpose field, one main gym, two auxiliary gyms, one pool, two soccer fields, two softball fields, and four tennis courts.

== Clubs and activities ==
Students at Pocono Mountain West can join the following clubs: Student Council, Scholastic Scrimmage, FBLA, Odyssey of the Mind, SADD, Science Olympiad, Leo Club, Speech and Debate, and Mock Trial.

== Notable alumni ==
- Michael Bamiro, former professional football player, New York Giants and Philadelphia Eagles
- Jacqueline Benítez, basketball player and 2020 Olympian
