= Thornhurst Township, Pennsylvania =

Township in Pennsylvania, US

Thornhurst Township
- Township
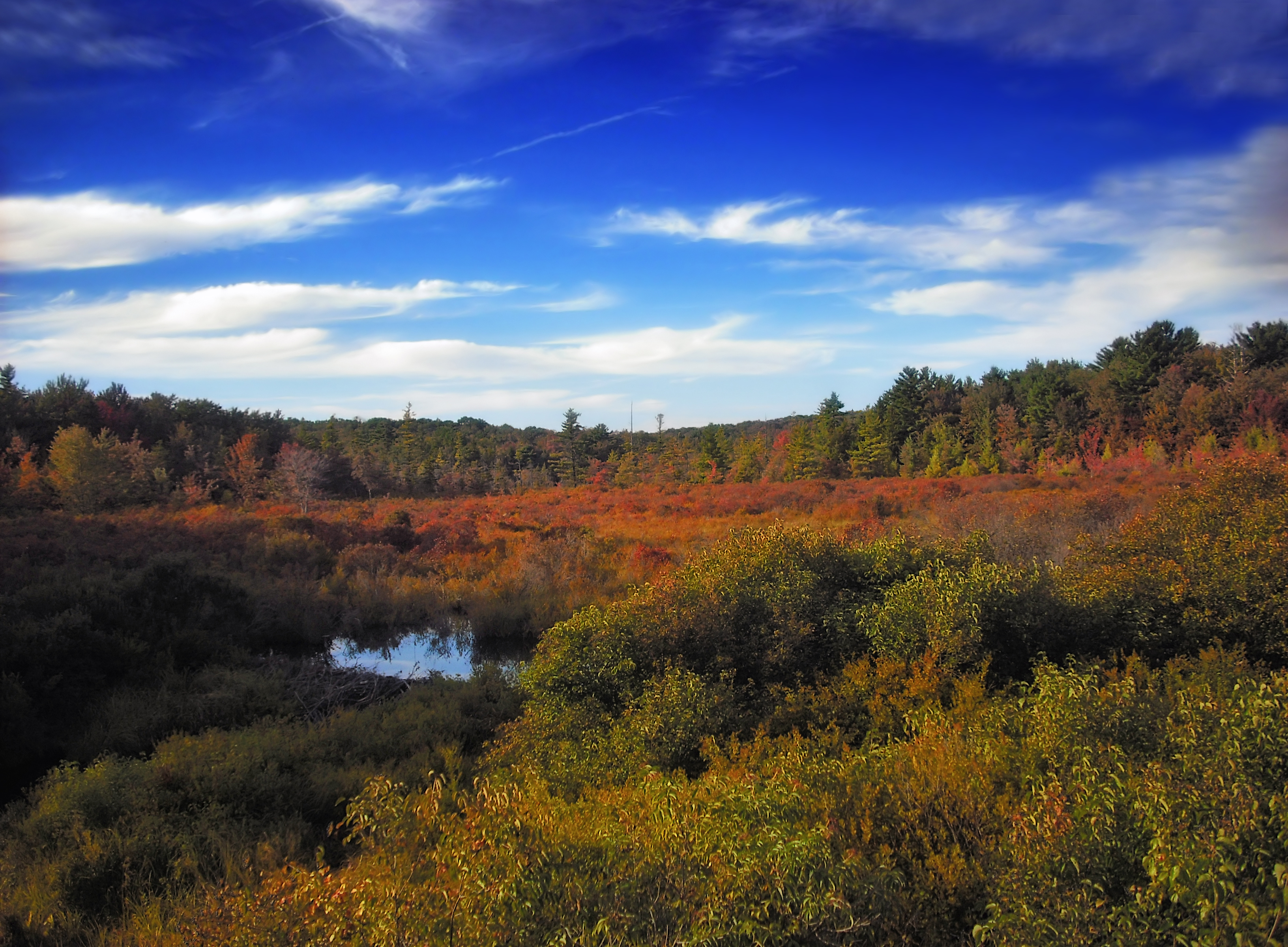
- A wetland in Thornhurst Township

- Coordinates: 41°13′00″N 75°37′59″W
- Country: United States
- State: Pennsylvania
- County: Lackawanna

Area
  - Total: 23.12 sq mi (59.88 km^{2})
  - Land: 22.90 sq mi (59.30 km^{2})
  - Water: 0.22 sq mi (0.58 km^{2})
- Elevation: 1,903 ft (580 m)

Population (2020)
  - Total: 1,012 ▼
  - Estimate (2021): 1,012
  - Density: 45.9/sq mi (17.72/km^{2})
- Time zone: UTC-5 (EST)
  - Summer (DST): UTC-4 (EDT)
- Postal code: 18424
- Area code: 570
- FIPS code: 42-069-76601
- Incorporated: 1878, as Lehigh Township
- Renamed: 1996, as Thornhurst Township
- Website: www.thornhursttwp.com

Thornhurst Township is a township in Lackawanna County, Pennsylvania, United States. The population was 1,012 at the 2020 census. The area is a part of the Pocono Mountains region.

The township was established in 1878 as Lehigh Township, so named for the Lehigh River. In 1996, to eliminate confusion between this and the township of the same name in Wayne County, the township changed its name to Thornhurst, the name of a community within the southern portion of the township.

== Geography ==
According to the United States Census Bureau, the township has a total area of 23.2 square miles (60.2 km^{2}), of which 23.0 square miles (59.6 km^{2}) is land and 0.2 square mile (0.6 km^{2}) (1.03%) is water. It is located in the Pocono Mountains. 20 miles from Wilkes-Barre, 25 miles from Scranton and 30 miles from Stroudsburg.

== Demographics ==
Historical population
Census	Pop.	Note	%±
2010	1,085		—
2020	1,012		−6.7%
2021 (est.)	1,012		0.0%
U.S. Decennial Census

As of the census of 2010, there were 1,085 people, 431 households, and 303 families residing in the township. The population density was 47.2 people per square mile. There were 617 housing units at an average density of 26.8/sq mi. The racial makeup of the township was 95.9% White, 1.3% African American, 0.2% Native American, 0.7% Asian, 0.5% from other races, and 1.4% from two or more races. Hispanic or Latino of any race were 3.6% of the population.

There were 431 households, out of which 28.8% had children under the age of 18 living with them, 56.4% were married couples living together, 10% had a female householder with no husband present, and 29.7% were non-families. 22.3% of all households were made up of individuals, and 6.4% had someone living alone who was 65 years of age or older. The average household size was 2.52 and the average family size was 2.95.

In the township the population was spread out, with 23.1% under the age of 18, 62.7% from 18 to 64, and 14.2% who were 65 years of age or older. The median age was 42.5 years.

The median income for a household in the township was $47,083, and the median income for a family was $60,750. Males had a median income of $46,625 versus $44,750 for females. The per capita income for the township was $26,859. About 8.5% of families and 12.3% of the population were below the poverty line, including 22.2% of those under age 18 and none of those age 65 or over.
