= Tobyhanna Army Depot =

Military installation in Monroe County, Pennsylvania

Coordinates: 41°11′36.0558″N 75°25′57.36″W

- Coolbaugh Township, Monroe County, Near Tobyhanna, Pennsylvania in the United States of America
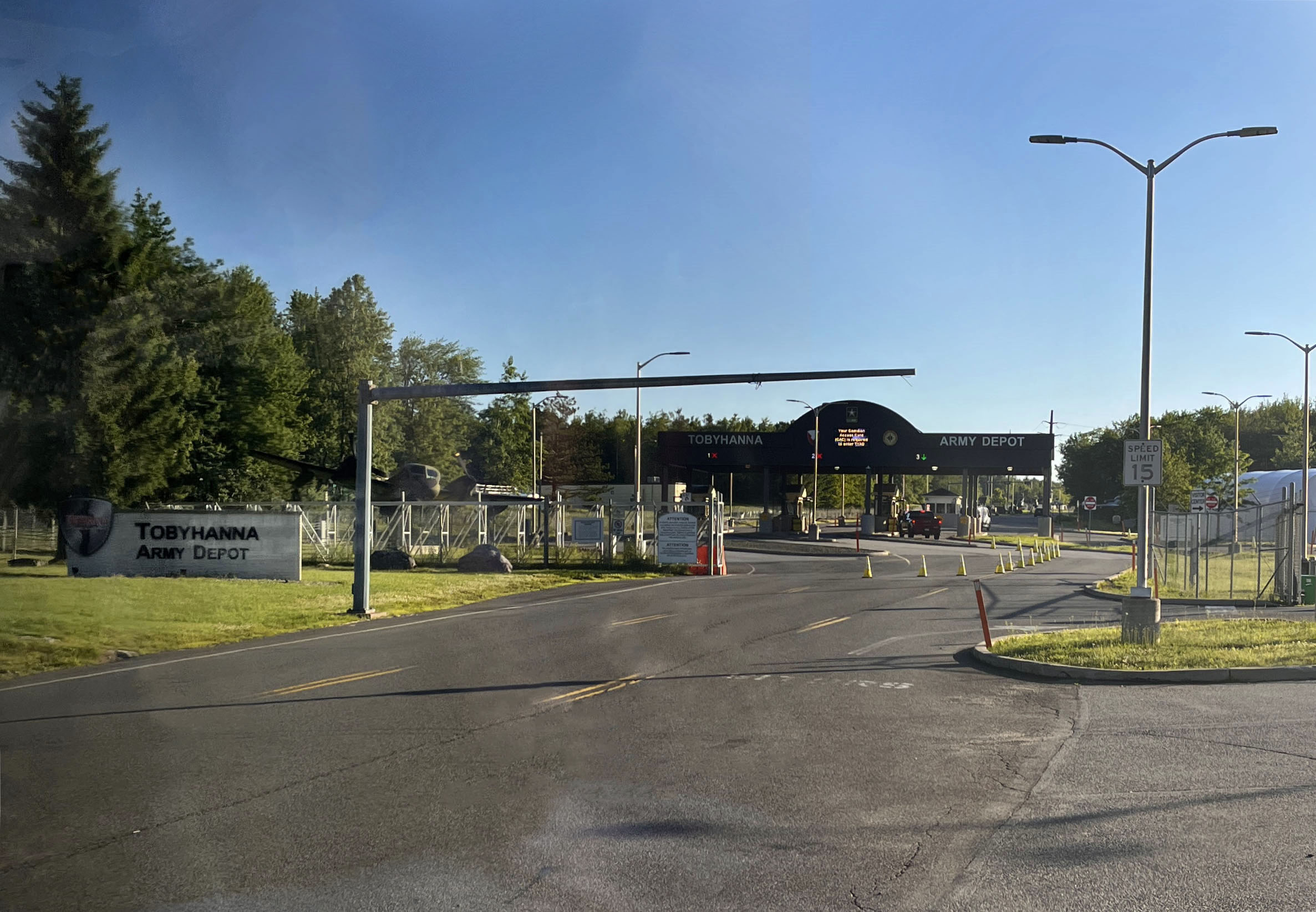
- Entrance to the Tobyhanna Army Depot in June 2022

Site information
- Type: US Army base
- Owner: Department of Defense
- Operator: United States Army
- Website: www.tobyhanna.army.mil

Location
- Location in the United States

Site history
- Built: February 1, 1953

Tobyhanna Army Depot (TYAD) (formerly Tobyhanna Signal Depot) is a full-service electronics maintenance facility in Coolbaugh Township, Pennsylvania. Established on February 1, 1953, on the site of a former artillery training range, the depot provides logistical and maintenance support for command and control electronics systems for the United States Department of Defense and repairs tactical ballistic missiles, rigid-wall shelters, and portable buildings for the United States Air Force. It employs 5,000 personnel, making it the largest industrial employer in northeastern Pennsylvania.

== Overview ==
The depot's current functions include design, manufacture, repair, and overhaul of electronic systems. These systems include satellite terminals, radio and radar systems, and telephones. They also work on electro-optics, night vision and anti-intrusion devices, airborne surveillance equipment, navigational instruments, electronic warfare systems, and guidance and control systems for tactical missiles. In addition, the depot operates 30 Forward Repair Activities at installations in the central US and overseas, including locations in the Middle East.

The U.S. Army has designated Tobyhanna as its "Center of Industrial and Technical Excellence for C4ISR and Electronics, Avionics, and Missile Guidance and Control," while the Air Force has designated it as its "Technical Source of Repair for command, control, communications, and intelligence systems." Tobyhanna has received new missions and workload in each of the five rounds of Defense Base Realignment and Closure (BRAC) between 1988 and 2005.

== History ==
From 1900 to 1936, Tobyhanna Lake and nearby lakes at Gouldsboro and Klondike were used for ice collection and storage, producing up to 150 boxcar loads per day between them, which were shipped as far as Florida.

In 1912, Tobyhanna had a railway station, telegraph, and post office. At that time, the U.S. Army had no artillery training range east of Wisconsin. Major Charles P. Summerall, commander of the 3rd Field Artillery at Fort Myer, Virginia, chose the site as a training range. After leasing land for $300 in 1912 and 1913, Summerall persuaded Congress to authorize the purchase of 18,000 acres (73 km^{2}) for $50,000. The military reservation was later expanded to 22,000 acres (89 km^{2}) according to the Tobyhanna Army Depot, or 26,000 acres (105 km^{2}) according to Pennsylvania DCNR.

The land was used as a tank and ambulance corps training center from 1914 to 1918, for artillery training from 1918 to 1931 and 1937 to 1941, and to house Civilian Conservation Corps enrolled from 1931 to 1937.

During World War II, initial plans for using the site for anti-aircraft artillery training were dropped due to the long range of more modern weapons. Some shells strayed onto private land, and the Scranton Times reported that crews could only fire one or two shells during each pass of a target, with guns limited to a 65-degree firing arc". The camp subsequently became the base of a segregated all-black ambulance corps, and a military hospital consisting of 19 single-story structures was constructed in anticipation of casualties from the planned invasion of Japan.

At the end of World War II, the military reservation became one of 138 sites around the United States holding German prisoners of war, with a maximum of 300 POWs. It was also used to store gliders used in the D-Day invasion. From 1946 to 1948, it was used by the U.S. Army Corps of Engineers. In April 1949, most of the military reservation was returned to Pennsylvania, and converted into Game Land 127, Gouldsboro State Park, and Tobyhanna State Park. However, 1,400 acres (5.7 km^{2}), after briefly being transferred to Pennsylvania, were reacquired by the Army Signal Corps in 1951 as the Tobyhanna Army Depot. The site was chosen for its access to East Coast shipping and proximity to manufacturers, while remaining outside potential nuclear blast zones surrounding New York City and Scranton. At that time, the decline of anthracite coal mining in the region had led to the unemployment of 35,000 workers. Two years before its opening, the Depot received 600 job applications per day. It became the largest industrial employer in northeastern Pennsylvania.

In 2005, President George W. Bush delivered his Veterans Day address at Tobyhanna Army Depot, noting the installation as a "facility that has provided critical services for our armed forces" and further recognizing depot workers for performing hazardous tasks.

In late 2016, the depot began using an anechoic chamber to test radars by simulating signals and targets. The chamber allowed testing to occur on-site rather than shipping systems to the Yuma Proving Ground, reducing costs.

On September 29, 2020, Senate Builders & Construction Managers Inc. was contracted to upgrade and renovate Building 1E at the Depot.
