= Pocono Springs, Pennsylvania =

Unincorporated community in Pennsylvania, US

- Private community Census-designated place
- Pocono Springs
- Nickname: Pocono Springs Estates
- Location in Wayne County and the state of Pennsylvania.
- Country: United States
- State: Pennsylvania
- U.S. Congressional Districts: PA-10; PA-17
- School Districts: Western Wayne (Region III); Wallenpaupack Area
- Counties: Wayne
- Magisterial Districts: 22-3-01
- Townships: Lehigh; Sterling
- Named after: Pocono Mountains

Area
  - Total: 3.980 sq mi (10.309 km^{2})
  - Land: 3.804 sq mi (9.853 km^{2})
  - Water: 0.176 sq mi (0.456 km^{2})
- Elevation: 2,070 ft (631 m)

Population (2010)
  - Total: 926
  - Density: 233/sq mi (89.8/km^{2})
- Time zone: UTC-5 (Eastern (EST))
  - Summer (DST): UTC-4 (Eastern Daylight (EDT))
- ZIP code: De facto 18424 (Gouldsboro); 18445 (Newfoundland)
- Area code: 570
- GNIS feature IDs: 1212903 (Community); 2633409 (CDP)
- FIPS codes: 42-127-42432-61774; 42-089-15960-61774
- Major Roads: link = Pennsylvania Route 507
- Waterways: Crystal Lake, Lehigh River, Mill Creek, Pocono Peak Lake
- Website: Pocono Springs

Pocono Springs is a private community and census-designated place (CDP) in Lehigh and Sterling Townships in Wayne County, Pennsylvania, United States. The CDP's population was 926 at the time of the 2010 United States Census.

== Geography ==
According to the United States Census Bureau, Pocono Springs has a total area of 3.980 mi^{2} (10.31 km^{2}), of which 3.804 mi^{2} (9.85 km^{2}) is land and 0.176 mi^{2} (0.46 km^{2}), or 4.42%, is water.

== Demographics ==
As of the Census of 2010, there were 926 people, 383 households, and 269 families in Pocono Springs. The CDP's population density was 233 people per square mile (90 people/km^{2}), and there were 866 housing units at an average density of 228/sq mi (87.9/km^{2}). The racial makeup of the populace was 92.1% White, 3.5% African American, 0.0% Native American, 1.1% Asian, 0.1% Pacific Islander, 1.2% of other races, and 2.1% of two or more races. Hispanics and Latinos of all races made up 5.1% of the population.

70.2% of Pocono Springs' households were families, 56.1% were headed by a heterosexual married couple (Pennsylvania did not allow same-sex marriage until May 20, 2014, after the 2010 Census had been completed), and 27.9% included children under the age of 18. 7.8% of households were headed by a female householder with no husband present, 6.3% by a male householder with no wife present, and 29.8% consisted of non-families. 23.8% of all households were made up of individuals, and 7.9% consisted of a person 65 years of age or older living alone. The average household size was 2.42 and the average family size was 2.84.

Pocono Springs' age distribution was 21.0% under the age of 18, 4.1% between the ages of 18 and 24, 22.6% between 25 and 44, 36.7% between 45 and 64, and 15.7% 65 years of age or older. The population's median age was 46.6 years. For every 100 females, there were 104 males. For every 100 females age 18 and over, there were 103 males in the same age range.

According to American Community Survey (ACS) estimates, the median income for a household in Pocono Springs in 2013 was $66,250, and the median income for a family was $77,067. Males had a median income of $51,250, while females had a median income of $32,986. The per capita income for the CDP was $35,592. 8.6% of families and 14.5% of people were below the Census Bureau's poverty thresholds (different from the federally defined poverty guidelines), including 23.4% of those under age 18 and 8.1% of those age 65 or over.

According to self-reported ancestry figures recorded by the ACS, the five largest ancestral groups in Pocono Springs in 2013 were Germans (34.7%), Irish (20.0%), Poles (12.7%), Italians (12.0%), and English (6.3%). Those reporting American ancestry made up 5.5% of the population.

== Education ==
The portion in Lehigh Township is in North Pocono School District. The portion in Sterling Township is in Western Wayne School District.
