= Gouldsboro, Pennsylvania =

Village in Pennsylvania, United States

- Village; Census-designated place
- Village of Gouldsboro
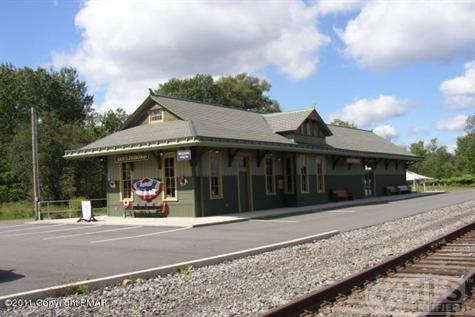
- Lackawanna Railroad's Gouldsboro Station, which was recently restored, in Gouldsboro, August 2011
- Nickname: Gouldsboro'
- Location in Wayne County and the U.S. state of Pennsylvania.
- Country: United States
- State: Pennsylvania
- U.S. Congressional Districts: PA-10; PA-17
- School Districts: North Pocono (Region III); Pocono Mountain (Region III)
- Counties: Wayne; Monroe
- Magisterial Districts: 22-3-01; 43-3-01
- Townships: Lehigh; Coolbaugh
- Settled: 1871
- Named after: Jay Gould

Area
  - Total: 3.005 sq mi (7.783 km^{2})
  - Land: 2.596 sq mi (6.723 km^{2})
  - Water: 0.41 sq mi (1.06 km^{2})
- Elevation: 1,909 ft (582 m)

Population (2020)
  - Total: 750
- Time zone: UTC−5 (Eastern (EST))
  - Summer (DST): UTC−4 (Eastern Daylight (EDT))
- ZIP Code: 18424
- Area code: 570
- GNIS feature IDs: 1175862 (Village); 2631315 (CDP)
- FIPS codes: 42-127-42432-30200; 42-089-15960-30200
- Waterways: Gouldsboro Lake, Larsen Lake, Lake Lehigh, Lehigh River, Lower Klondike Pond, Snag Pond, Lake Watawga, Westend Pond

Gouldsboro is a village and census-designated place (CDP) in Lehigh Township in Wayne County, and Coolbaugh Township, in Monroe County, Pennsylvania, United States. The CDP's population was 750 at time of the 2020 United States Census.

== History ==
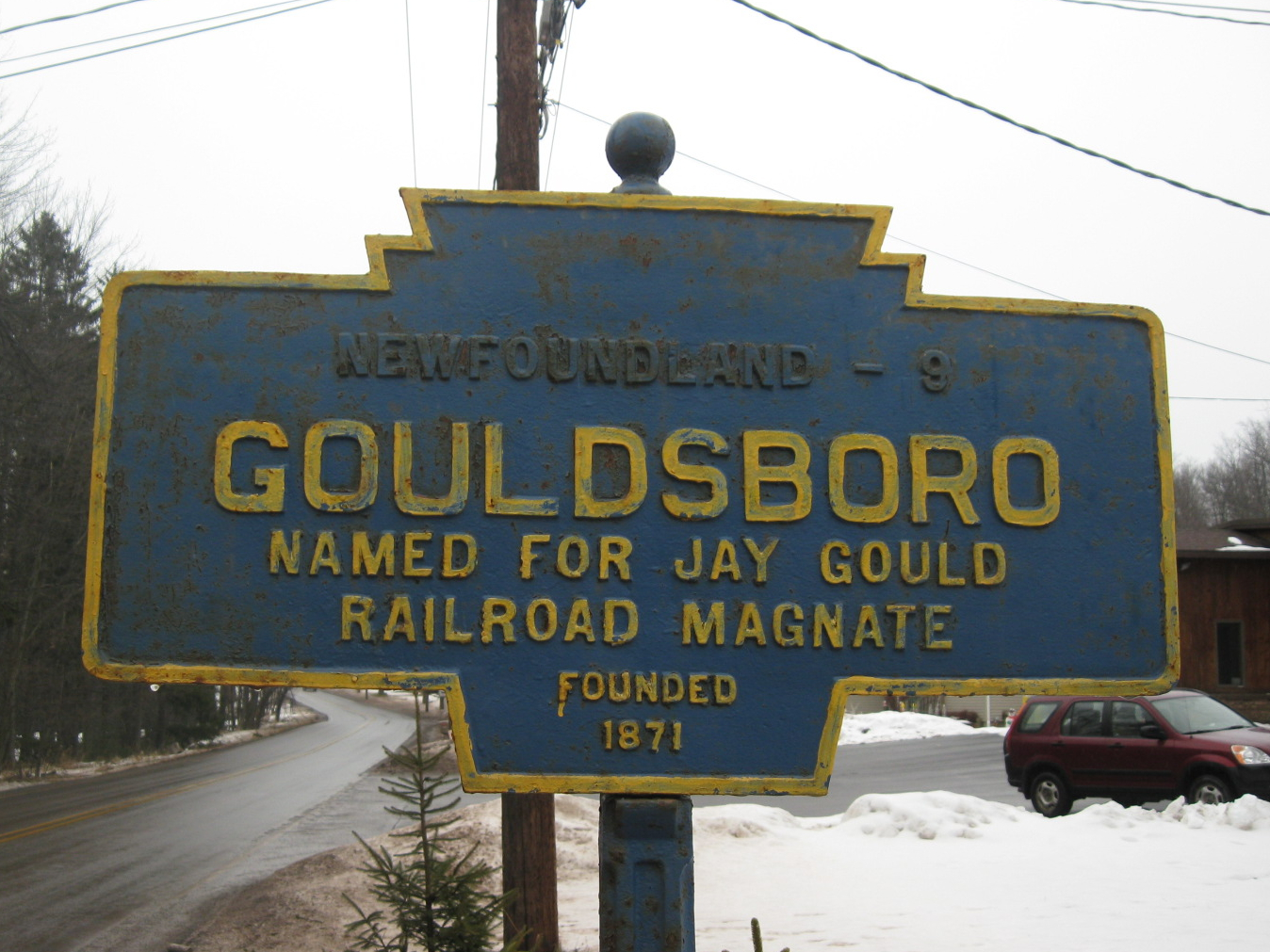
Gouldsboro's Keystone Marker

Gouldsboro was named for Jay Gould, who built a tannery in the area before becoming famous as a financier.

== Geography ==
According to the United States Census Bureau, Gouldsboro has a total area of 3.004 sq mi (7.783 km^{2}), of which 2.596 sq mi (6.723 km^{2}) is land and 0.408 sq mi (1.06 km^{2}), or 5.72%, is water.

== Demographics ==
Historical population
Census	Pop.	Note	%±
2010	890		—
2020	750		−15.7%

As of the Census of 2010, there were 890 people, 353 households, and 253 families in Gouldsboro. The CDP's population density was 343 inhabitants per square mile (132/km^{2}), and there were 546 housing units at an average density of 182/sq mi (70.2/km^{2}). The racial makeup of the populace was 94.9% White, 1.0% African American, 0.1% Native American, 1.3% Asian, 0.1% Pacific Islander, 1.3% of other races, and 1.1% of two or more races. Hispanics and Latinos of all races made up 4.0% of the population.

Of Gouldsboro's households 71.7% were families, 55.8% were headed by a heterosexual married couple (Pennsylvania did not allow same-sex marriage until May 20, 2014, after the 2010 Census had been completed), and 30.3% included children under the age of 18. Of households 10.8% were headed by a female householder with no husband present, 5.1% by a male householder with no wife present, and 28.3% consisted of non-families. Of all households 24.1% were made up of individuals, and 13.3% consisted of a person 65 years of age or older living alone. The average household size was 2.52 and the average family size was 2.95.

Gouldsboro's age distribution was 23.9% under the age of 18, 5.2% between the ages of 18 and 24, 19.9% between 25 and 44, 34.7% between 45 and 64, and 16.3% 65 years of age or older. The population's median age was 45.4 years. For every 100 females, there were 98.7 males. For every 100 females age 18 and over, there were 99.7 males in the same age range.

According to American Community Survey (ACS) estimates, the median income for a household in Gouldsboro in 2013 was $45,469, and the median income for a family was $54,000. Males had a median income of $50,000, while females had a median income of $28,750. The per capita income for the CDP was $27,753. Of families 0.0% and 1.4% of people were below the Census Bureau's poverty thresholds (different from the federally defined poverty guidelines), including 0.0% of those under age 18 and 4.7% of those age 65 or over.

According to self-reported ancestry figures recorded by the ACS, the five largest ancestral groups in Gouldsboro in 2013 were Irish (40.3%), Germans (38.0%), Poles (13.9%), English (13.4%), and Italians (13.3%). Those reporting American ancestry made up 2.5% of the population.

== Parks and recreation ==
Gouldsboro is home to the Gouldsboro State Park. The village is serviced and is within the North Pocono School District.

The former Lackawanna Railroad station houses a railroad museum and is served by excursion trains from Steamtown National Historic Site in nearby Scranton.

The area is extremely scenic and popular with hunters and naturalists. Much of Wayne County's water is under special protection.

== Education ==
The majority of Gouldsboro is in Lehigh Township, and is therefore served primarily by the North Pocono School District, in which it is part of Region III.

The small part of the CDP which is contained within Coolbaugh Township, however, is in the Pocono Mountain School District,. in which it is also part of Region III.

== Postal Service ==
In addition to parts of the aforementioned Lehigh and Coolbaugh Townships, parts of Clifton, Thornhurst, and Covington Townships in Lackawanna County are serviced by the Gouldsboro Post Office, and are also often referred to as "Gouldsboro".
