= Jericho, Wayne County, Pennsylvania =

Unincorporated community in Pennsylvania, US

Jericho, Pennsylvania
- Village
- Village of Jericho
- Jericho's Location within Pennsylvania.
- Coordinates: 41°19′9″N 75°23′26″W
- Country: United States
- State: Pennsylvania
- U.S. Congressional District: PA-10
- School District: Western Wayne; Region III
- County: Wayne
- Magisterial District: 22-3-01
- Township: Sterling
- Settled: c. 1818
- Founded by: Amasa Megargel
- Named after: Jericho, Palestine
- Elevation: 1,570 ft (480 m)
- Time zone: UTC-5 (Eastern (EST))
  - Summer (DST): UTC-4 (Eastern Daylight (EDT))
- ZIP code: De facto 18424 (Gouldsboro); 18445 (Newfoundland)
- Area code: 570
- GNIS feature ID: 1203894
- FIPS code: 42-127-73968-38076
- Waterways: Butternut Creek, Memory Lake, Rock Port Creek, Lehigh River (West Fork)

Jericho is a village in Sterling Township, Wayne County, Pennsylvania, United States.

== History ==
The Jericho Post Office was open between 1858 and 1861.
