= Big Bass Lake =

Unincorporated community in Pennsylvania, US

- Census-designated place
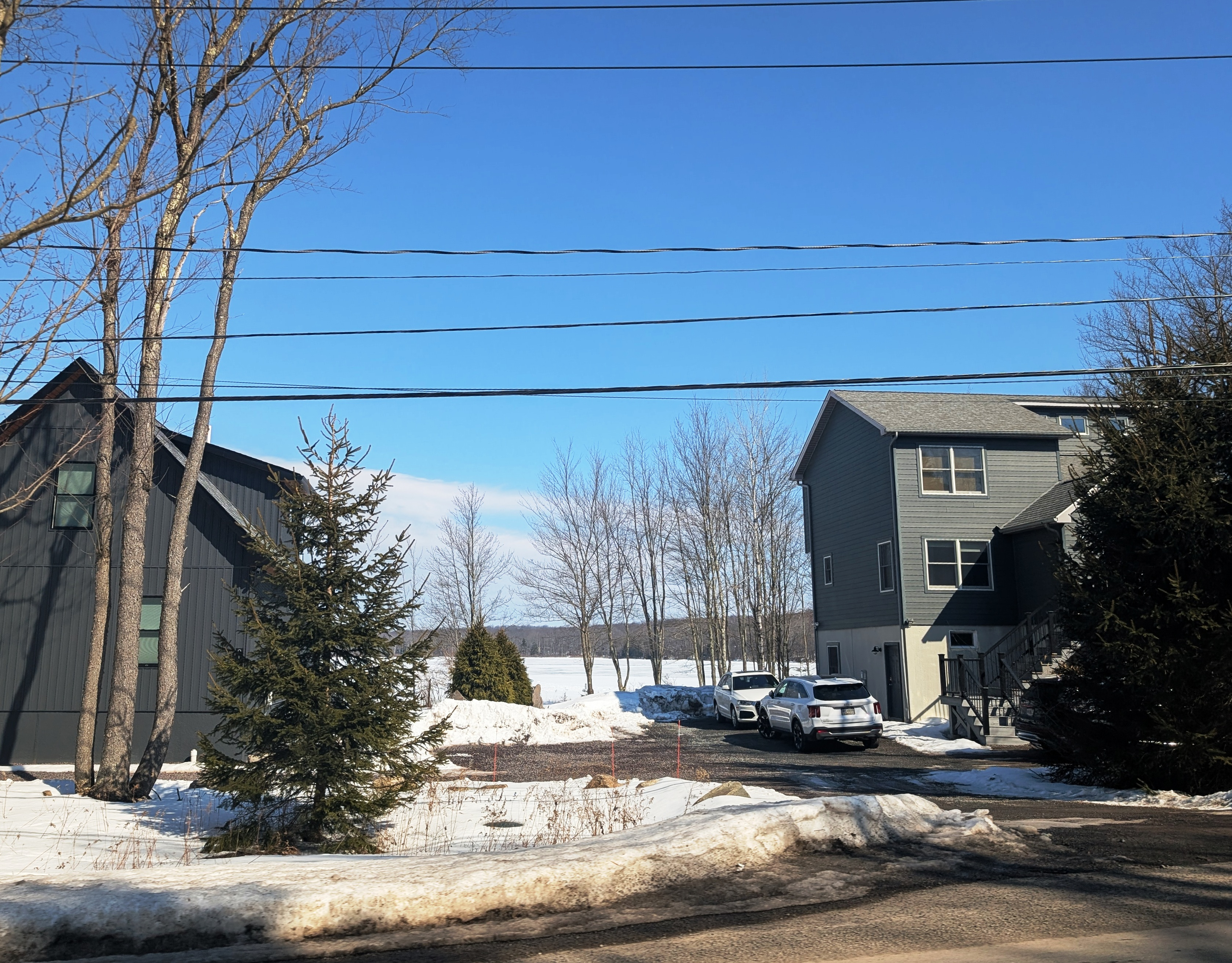
- Big Bass Lake frozen over as seen from Phillips Road in February 2026

- Location of Big Bass Lake Big Bass Lake (the United States)
- Coordinates: 41°15′20″N 75°29′4″W
- Country: United States
- State: Pennsylvania
- County: Lackawanna; Wayne
- Township: Clifton; Covington; Lehigh

Area
  - Total: 4.37 sq mi (11.32 km^{2})
  - Land: 4.13 sq mi (10.70 km^{2})
  - Water: 0.24 sq mi (0.62 km^{2})
- Elevation: 1,830 ft (560 m)

Population (2020)
  - Total: 1,337
  - Density: 323.5/sq mi (124.92/km^{2})
- Time zone: UTC-5 (EST)
  - Summer (DST): UTC-4 (EDT)
- ZIP code: 18424
- Area codes: 570/272
- FIPS code: 42-06236
- Website: Big Bass Lake Community Association

Big Bass Lake is a private community and census-designated place (CDP) in Clifton and Covington Townships in Lackawanna County and Lehigh Township, Wayne County, Pennsylvania, United States. As of the 2020 census, Big Bass Lake had a population of 1,337.

== Geography ==
Big Bass Lake is located at 41°15′20″N 75°29′4″W (41.2533624, -75.4840284).

According to the United States Census Bureau, the CDP has a total area of 4.37 square miles, of which 4.13 square miles is land and 0.24 square mile (5.49%) is water.

== Climate ==
Interpolated climate data shows the area has a very cold climate by Pennsylvania's standards, comparable to climates in the Adirondack mountains and northern New England.

Climate data for Big Bass Lake, Clifton Twp, Lackawanna County, Pennsylvania (1981 – 2010 averages)
Month	Jan	Feb	Mar	Apr	May	Jun	Jul	Aug	Sep	Oct	Nov	Dec	Year
Mean daily maximum °F (°C)	30.9 (−0.6)	34.5 (1.4)	42.8 (6.0)	55.3 (12.9)	66.3 (19.1)	74.4 (23.6)	78.5 (25.8)	77.1 (25.1)	69.7 (20.9)	58.1 (14.5)	47.2 (8.4)	35.3 (1.8)	55.9 (13.3)
Mean daily minimum °F (°C)	13.9 (−10.1)	16.1 (−8.8)	22.6 (−5.2)	33.4 (0.8)	43.2 (6.2)	51.9 (11.1)	56.8 (13.8)	55.6 (13.1)	48.5 (9.2)	37.2 (2.9)	29.4 (−1.4)	19.6 (−6.9)	35.8 (2.1)
Average precipitation inches (mm)	3.52 (89)	3.00 (76)	3.73 (95)	4.33 (110)	4.33 (110)	4.73 (120)	4.58 (116)	3.91 (99)	4.90 (124)	4.67 (119)	4.17 (106)	3.77 (96)	49.64 (1,260)
Average snowfall inches (cm)	19.3 (49)	13.9 (35)	14.4 (37)	3.4 (8.6)	0.0 (0.0)	0.0 (0.0)	0.0 (0.0)	0.0 (0.0)	0.0 (0.0)	0.1 (0.25)	3.7 (9.4)	11.6 (29)	66.4 (169)
Source: PRISM

== Demographics ==
Historical population
Census	Pop.	Note	%±
2020	1,337		—
U.S. Decennial Census

At the 2010 census, there were 1,270 people, 550 households, and 393 families in the CDP. The population density was 317.5 people per square mile. There were 1,211 housing units at an average density of 293.2/sq mi. The racial makeup of the CDP was 94.6% White, 2.3% African American, 0.9% Asian, 1.1% from other races, and 1.1% from two or more races. Hispanic or Latino of any race were 5% of the population.

There were 550 households, 14.4% had children under the age of 18 living with them, 59.8% were married couples living together, 7.3% had a female householder with no husband present, and 28.5% were non-families. 22.7% of households were made up of individuals, and 9.5% were one person aged 65 or older. The average household size was 2.31 and the average family size was 2.68.

The age distribution was 16.5% under the age of 18, 58.9% from 18 to 64, and 24.6% 65 or older. The median age was 51.7 years.

== Education ==
The school district is North Pocono School District.
