= The Hideout, Pennsylvania =

Unincorporated community in Pennsylvania, US

The Hideout
- Census-designated place
- Flag Logo

- Location in Wayne County and the state of Pennsylvania.
- Coordinates: 41°26′07″N 75°20′59″W
- Country: United States
- State: Pennsylvania
- County: Wayne
- Township: Lake; Salem

Area
  - Total: 6.7 sq mi (17 km^{2})
  - Land: 6.1 sq mi (16 km^{2})
  - Water: 0.6 sq mi (1.6 km^{2})
- Elevation: 1,450 ft (440 m)

Population (2010)
  - Total: 3,013
  - Density: 490/sq mi (190/km^{2})
- Time zone: UTC-5 (EST)
  - Summer (DST): UTC-4 (EDT)
- ZIP Code: 18436
- Area code: 570

The Hideout is a private community and census-designated place (CDP) in Lake and Salem Townships in Wayne County, Pennsylvania, United States. The community's population was 3,013 at the time of the 2010 United States Census.

== Demographics ==
As of the census of 2010, there were 3,013 people, 1,325 households, and 969 families residing in the CDP. The population density was 493.9 people per square mile. There were 3,306 housing units at an average density of 541.9/sq mi. The racial makeup of the CDP was 94.5% White, 2.8% African American, 0.2% American Indian, 0.3% Asian, 0.8% from other races, and 1.4% from two or more races. Hispanic or Latino of any race were 5.2% of the population.

There were 1,325 households, out of which 19.8% had children under the age of 18 living with them, 62.8% were married couples living together, 7.2% had a female householder with no husband present, and 26.9% were non-families. 22.6% of all households were made up of individuals, and 11% had someone living alone who was 65 years of age or older. The average household size was 2.27 and the average family size was 2.64.

In the CDP, the population was spread out, with 16% under the age of 18, 54.8% from 18 to 64, and 29.2% who were 65 years of age or older. The median age was 54.7 years.

== Education ==
It is in the Western Wayne School District.
