= North Pocono High School =

Public secondary school in Covington Township, Pennsylvania, United States

Coordinates: 41.3366°N 75.5294°W

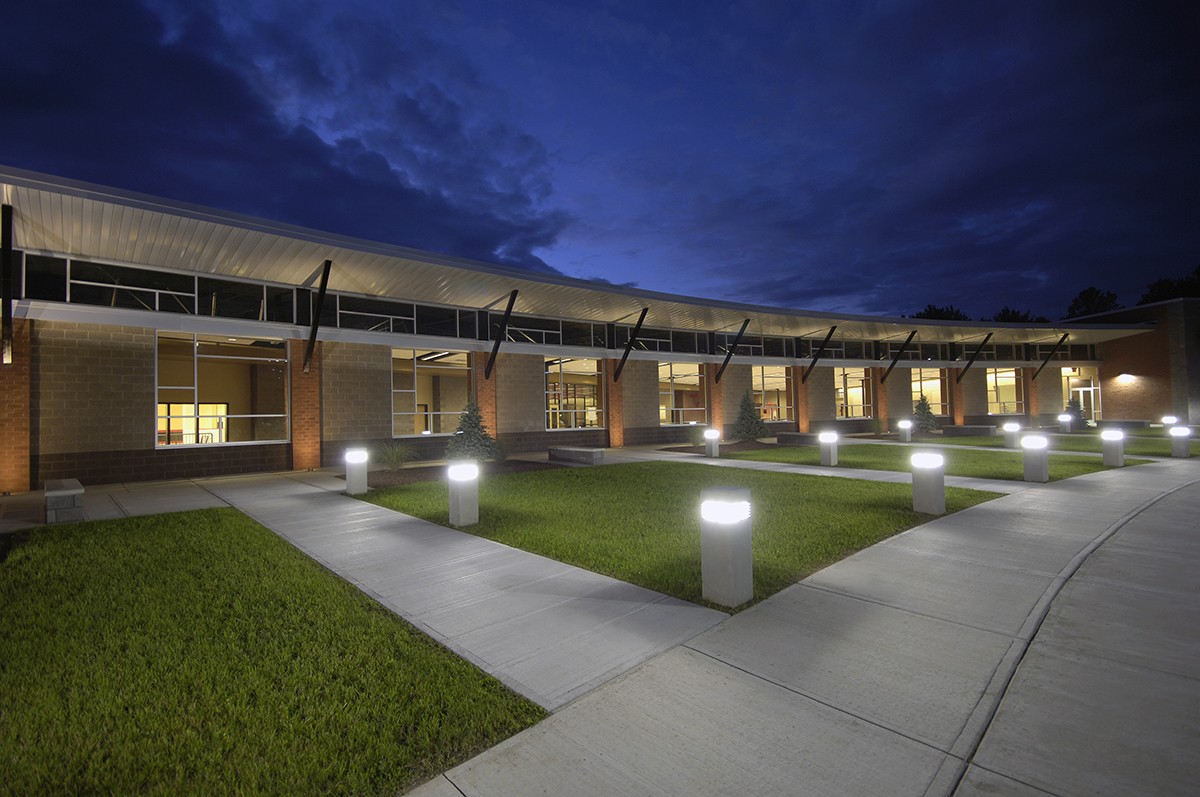

Location
- 97 Bochicchio Blvd; Covington Township, Pennsylvania 18444; United States

Information
- School type: Public high school
- Established: 1964
- School district: North Pocono School District
- Principal: Ronald Collins
- Faculty: 68
- Grades: 9-12
- Enrollment: 959 (2015-16)
- Student to teacher ratio: 1:15
- Campus type: Rural
- Colors: Red, White and Black
- Mascot: Trojan
- Information: 570-842-7606
- Website: Official website

North Pocono High School is a public, four-year high school located in Covington Township, Lackawanna County, Pennsylvania. The school building was built in 2009. It is the only high school in the North Pocono School District, which covers a vast territory in northeastern Pennsylvania, including parts of Wayne County and all of southern and east-central Lackawanna County.

North Pocono has been ranked as one of America's Most Challenging High Schools by the Washington Post for two consecutive years and one of America's Best High Schools by Newsweek. North Pocono is also one of two school districts nationwide to make the AP Honor Roll for six consecutive years.

The old high school, on Church Street in the borough of Moscow, is now the North Pocono Middle School and houses grades 6 through 8, with the new high school containing grades 9 through 12.

There are over 70 faculty members, which creates a teacher-student ratio of 1:15. Each grade consists of 220-280 students.

== Accreditation ==
North Pocono High School is accredited by the Pennsylvania Department of Education and Middle States Association of Colleges and Secondary Schools.

== Administration ==
- Daniel Powell: Superintendent of Schools
- Ian Farr: Assistant Superintendent
- Ronald Collins: Principal
- Christopher Sload: Vice Principal
- Jamie McHugh: Vice Principal
- Nicholas Swaha: Athletic Director

== Academics ==
North Pocono High School offers six programs of study.

Academic: The academic program of study provides students with a well-rounded education. This course will prepare students for college or continuing their education.

Accelerated: The accelerated program of study is designed to position students to engage in challenging and enriching course content. The sequence of courses is designed puts students in classes a year in advance of the academic students in science and math. During the junior year, assignments and difficulty will focus on college readiness. During senior year, assignments and difficulty will focus on college level content.

Basic/General: The general program of study prepares students for integration into the 21st Century workforce or transition into some kind of post-secondary education or training.

Business: The business program combines the general or academic program of study with business electives.

Vocational: The vocational program of study offers students an opportunity to combine their general or academic program of study at North Pocono High School with one of sixteen vocational programs of study offered through the Career Technology Center of Lackawanna County.

Advanced Placement: The Advanced Placement (AP) Program offers college level courses and examinations to high school students. The underlying premise of the AP Program is that college level courses can be successfully taught to high school students by high school teachers on high school campuses. Advanced Placement courses make it possible for academically talented students to upgrade the quality and increase the challenge of their studies, both in high school and college. The Advanced Placement Program consists of courses identified by the College Board as college level in content. Upon successful completion of an AP course, it is strongly suggested that students take the corresponding AP exam to realize the full benefit of the course. Based on the score the student receives on a particular examination and the specific college or university that a student chooses to attend, college credit, advanced standing or course waiver may be offered to that student. Students enrolled in these courses will be expected to perform at a stringent level of competence and should anticipate a significant amount of additional work outside of class.

North Pocono High School offers the following Advanced Placement (AP) courses:

- AP Art History
- AP Biology
- AP Calculus AB
- AP Calculus BC
- AP Chemistry
- AP Computer Science Principles
- AP English Literature and Composition
- AP English Language and Composition
- AP Environmental Science
- AP Macroeconomics
- AP Microeconomics
- AP Music Theory
- AP Physics 1
- AP Physics 2
- AP Psychology
- AP Studio Art 2-D Design
- AP Studio Art 3-D Design
- AP Studio Art Drawing
- AP Statistics
- AP U.S. Government & Politics
- AP U.S. History
- AP Spanish
- AP World History

== Departments ==
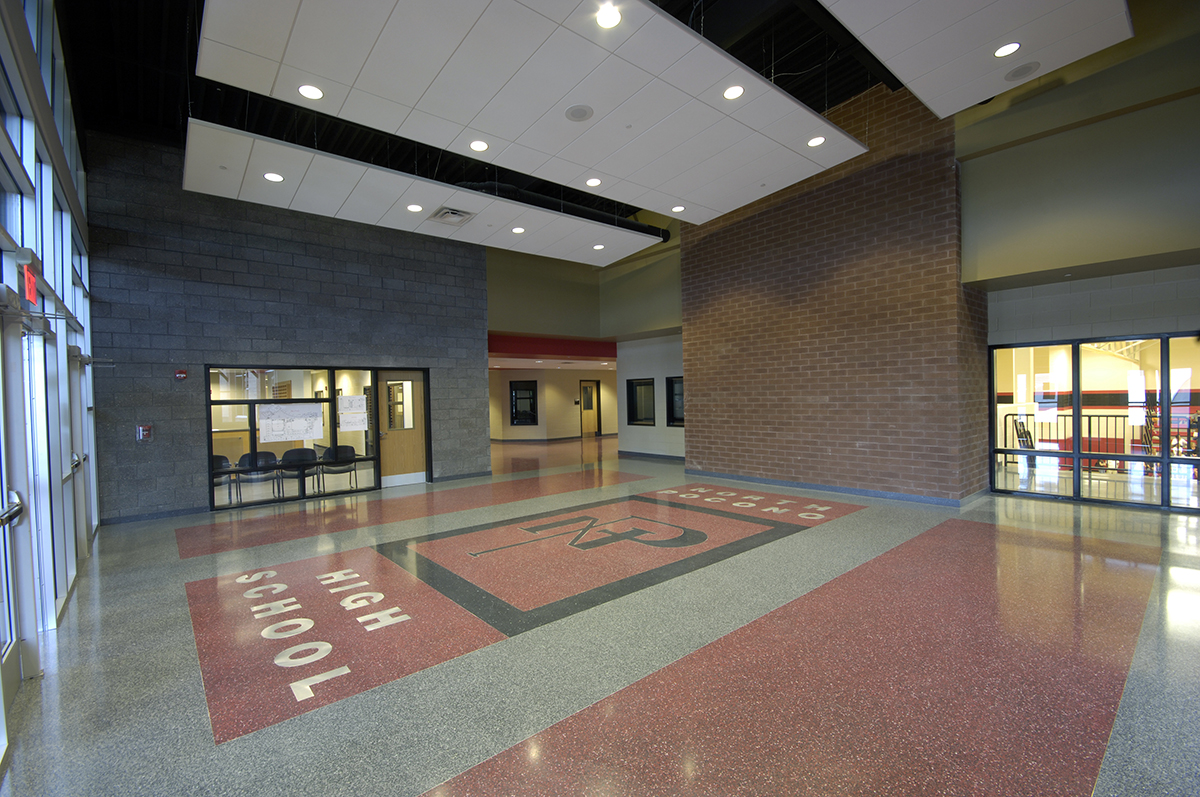
The lobby of North Pocono High School.

The school is organized into the following departments:

- Art
- Business
- English
- Family & Consumer Science
- Foreign Language
- Health and Physical Education
- Mathematics
- Music
- Science
- Social Studies
- Technology
- Vocational

== Graduation requirements ==
In order to graduate, a student must acquire a minimum of 21 credits in grades 9 through 12. These 21 credits must include the following:

- 4 credits of English
- 4 credits of Social Studies
- 3 credits of Mathematics
- 3 credits of Science
- 1 credit of Health and Physical Education
- Balance of credits required: Electives

== Grading ==
- A 96 to 100
- A- 92 to 95
- B+ 88 to 91
- B 84 to 87
- B- 81 to 83
- C+ 78 to 80
- C 74 to 77
- C- 70 to 73
- D 65 to 69
- F 0 to 64

In order to reward and encourage students to take enriched course, a numerical multiplier will be used to calculate weighted GPA. The weighted GPA will determine class rank and honors graduate status. This is an incentive to reward students that take a more challenging course of study. Multipliers will not be reflected in any grades reported on report cards of transcripts.

- Advanced Placement Courses x 1.10 = 110 total points possible (4.40 Maximum Weighted GPA)
- Accelerated Courses x 1.06 = 106 total points possible (4.24 Maximum Weighted GPA)
- Academic Courses x 1.02 = 102 total points possible (4.08 Maximum Weighted GPA)
- General Courses x 1.00 = 100 total points possible (4.00 Maximum Weighted GPA)

Honor Roll status is determined at the end of each marking period, and will be based on a student's weighted GPA. High Honors will be based on a minimum weighted GPA of 3.80. Honors will be based on a minimum weighted GPA of 3.52. Students must maintain a minimum grade of 75% in minor courses. In addition, any grade below the following in any major course will disqualify a student from Honor Roll status:

- General 83%
- Academic 82%
- Accelerated 81%
- Advanced Placement 80%

== Sports and Activities ==
North Pocono High School is home to the North Pocono Trojans, whose mascot is the trojan. The Trojans actively participate in the following sports:

- Boys' Baseball
- Boys' Basketball
- Coed Cheerleading (fall and winter)
- Coed Cross Country
- Boys' Football
- Gymnastics
- Coed Golf
- Boys' Lacrosse
- Girls' Lacrosse
- Girls' Soccer
- Girls' Softball
- Girls' Tennis
- Boys' Tennis
- Girls' Volleyball
- Boys' Volleyball
- Coed Track and Field
- Coed Rifle
- They also have one swimmer

North Pocono also offers the following activities:

- Art Club
- Debate Club
- Dead Language Society
- Environmental Club
- Future Business Leaders of America (FBLA)
- Gay Straight Alliance (GSA)
- Interact Club
- Junior Academy of Science
- Mathletes Club
- Mock Trial Team
- National Honor Society (NHS)
- Prom Committee
- Reading Celebrations
- Red Cross Club
- Students Against Destructive Decisions (SADD)
- Science Olympiad
- Ski Club
- Student Council
- Trojan Voice Student Newspaper
- Yearbook Staff

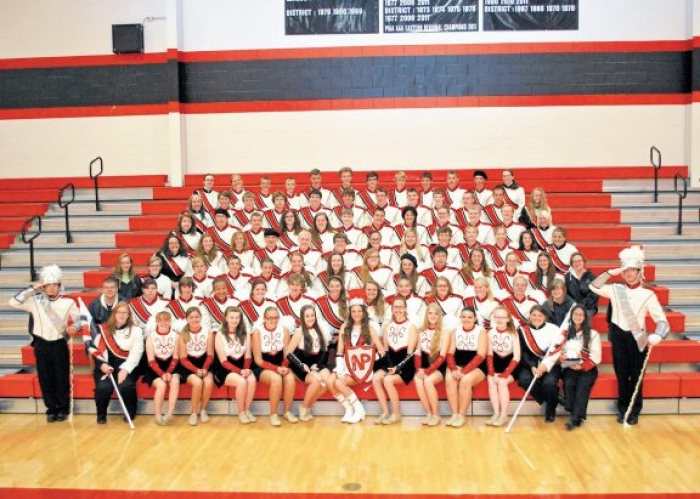
The North Pocono Trojan Band consists of over 85 band and unit members, making it one of the largest bands in the area.

North Pocono is well known for its talented faculty and students in the arts department. North Pocono High School offers the following performing and visual groups:

- Orchestra
- String Ensemble
- Chorus
- Show Choir
- A Capella Ensemble
- Steel Drum Band
- Jazz Ensemble
- Concert Band
- Trojan Marching Band
- Color Guard
- Majorettes
- Honor Guard
- Band Managers
- Drama Club
