= Eagle Lake, Pennsylvania =

Unincorporated community in Pennsylvania, US

- Census-designated place
- Location within Pennsylvania Location within the United States
- Coordinates: 41°17′1″N 75°28′54″W
- Country: United States
- State: Pennsylvania
- County: Lackawanna
- Township: Covington

Area
  - Total: 2.52 sq mi (6.53 km^{2})
  - Land: 2.38 sq mi (6.17 km^{2})
  - Water: 0.14 sq mi (0.35 km^{2})
- Elevation: 1,940 ft (590 m)

Population (2020)
  - Total: 12
  - Density: 5.0/sq mi (1.94/km^{2})
- Time zone: UTC-5 (Eastern (EST))
  - Summer (DST): UTC-4 (EDT)
- FIPS code: 42-20634
- GNIS feature ID: 2633364

Eagle Lake is a census-designated place (CDP) in Covington Township, Lackawanna County, Pennsylvania, United States. As of the 2010 census, the population was 12. At that time, of 95 total housing units, five were occupied, while the remainder were for seasonal or recreational use.

== Demographics ==
Historical population
Census	Pop.	Note	%±
2020	12		—
U.S. Decennial Census

== Education ==
The school district is North Pocono School District.
