= Moscow, Pennsylvania =

Borough in Pennsylvania, US

- Borough
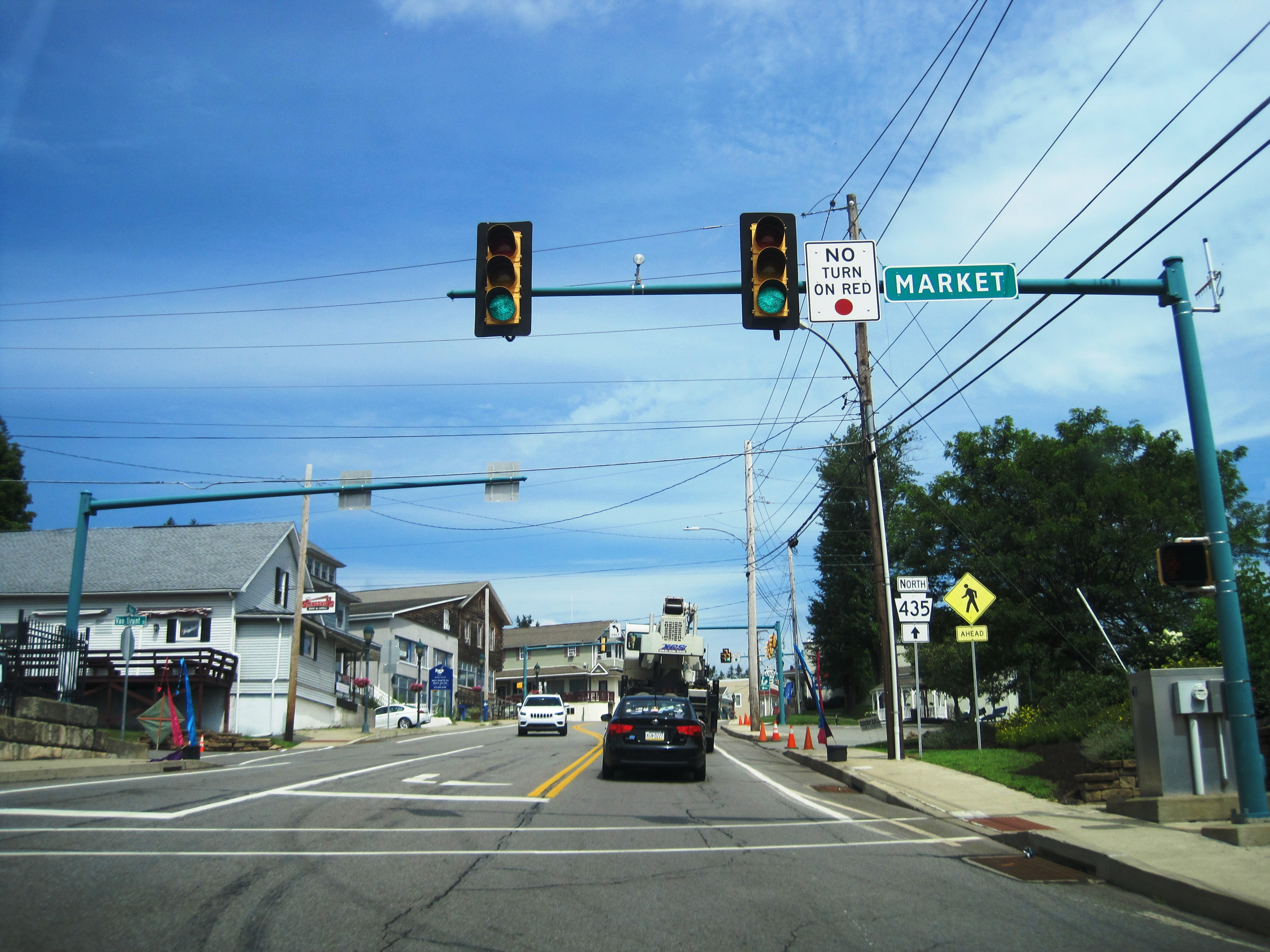
- Downtown Moscow in 2022

- Location of Moscow in Lackawanna County, Pennsylvania

- Location in Pennsylvania Location in the United States
- Coordinates: 41°20′21″N 75°31′45″W
- Country: United States
- State: Pennsylvania
- County: Lackawanna
- Established: 1854
- Founder: W.B. Miller

Government
  - Mayor: Rosemarie Warner

Area
  - Total: 2.85 sq mi (7.39 km^{2})
  - Land: 2.85 sq mi (7.38 km^{2})
  - Water: 0.0039 sq mi (0.01 km^{2})
- Elevation: 1,722 ft (525 m)

Population (2020)
  - Total: 2,039
  - Density: 715.8/sq mi (276.36/km^{2})
- Time zone: UTC-5 (EST)
  - Summer (DST): UTC-4 (EDT)
- Zip Code: 18444
- Area code: 570
- FIPS code: 42-51208
- Website: www.moscowboro.com

Moscow is a borough in Lackawanna County, Pennsylvania, United States. The population was 2,039 at the 2020 census. It is located 11 miles (18 km) southeast of Scranton and 24 miles (39 km) southwest of Honesdale.

== Name ==
Moscow was settled in the 1830s and is said to be named for the Russian city by early settlers who may have been Prussian Lutherans.

== Geography ==
Moscow is located at 41°20′21″N 75°31′45″W (41.339274, -75.529053).

According to the United States Census Bureau, the borough has a total area of 2.8 square miles (7.3 km^{2}), all land, with negligible surface water. Roaring Brook, a tributary of the Lackawanna River and part of the Susquehanna River watershed, flows northward through Moscow, and many tributary streams merge there with the brook.

== Demographics ==
Historical population
Census	Pop.	Note	%±
1880	320		—
1890	582		81.9%
1910	650		—
1920	702		8.0%
1930	892		27.1%
1940	1,097		23.0%
1950	1,050		−4.3%
1960	1,212		15.4%
1970	1,430		18.0%
1980	1,536		7.4%
1990	1,527		−0.6%
2000	1,883		23.3%
2010	2,026		7.6%
2020	2,039		0.6%
2021 (est.)	2,047	▲	0.4%

At the 2010 census there were 2,026 people, 751 households, and 569 families residing in the borough. The population density was 723.6 inhabitants per square mile (279.4/km^{2}). There were 789 housing units at an average density of 281.8 per square mile (108.8/km^{2}). The racial makeup of the borough was 97.9% White, 0.3% African American, 0.9% Asian, and 0.8% from two or more races. Hispanic or Latino of any race were 1.7%.

There were 751 households, 34.6% had children under the age of 18 living with them, 64% were married couples living together, 7.9% had a female householder with no husband present, and 24.2% were non-families. 21.3% of households were made up of individuals, and 10.4% were one person aged 65 or older. The average household size was 2.7 and the average family size was 3.17.

In the borough the population was spread out, with 25% under the age of 18, 60.7% from 18 to 64, and 14.3% 65 or older. The median age was 40 years.

The median household income was $58,686 and the median family income was $77,583. Males had a median income of $51,250 versus $37,054 for females. The per capita income for the borough was $32,888. About 6.1% of families and 5.2% of the population were below the poverty line, including 1.1% of those under age 18 and 3.5% of those age 65 or over.

== Education ==
Moscow is serviced by the North Pocono School District. Moscow has five schools within the borough: North Pocono Middle School, North Pocono Intermediate School, Moscow Elementary Center, North Pocono Preschool, and Moscow United Methodist Preschool. Nearby Covington Township contains the site of North Pocono High School, North Pocono Head Start, and the Lackawanna College Environmental Institute. Jefferson Township also contains a North Pocono School District elementary school in Jefferson Elementary School.

Within the school grounds, the school district has athletic facilities including the North Pocono Trojan Stadium at North Pocono Middle School. The complex includes a new turf football field, new rubber tennis courts, and multiple weight and training rooms. At North Pocono High School is the North Pocono Sports Complex. This includes two grass soccer fields, a softball field, and a baseball field.

== Attractions ==
Attractions and amenities in the borough include six parks, many youth sports leagues, four churches, the North Pocono Trails Association, and the North Pocono Public Library.

The former Lackawanna Railroad station houses a railroad museum and is currently served by excursion trains from nearby Steamtown National Historic Site.
