= Lake Ariel, Pennsylvania =

Unincorporated community in Pennsylvania, US

- Village
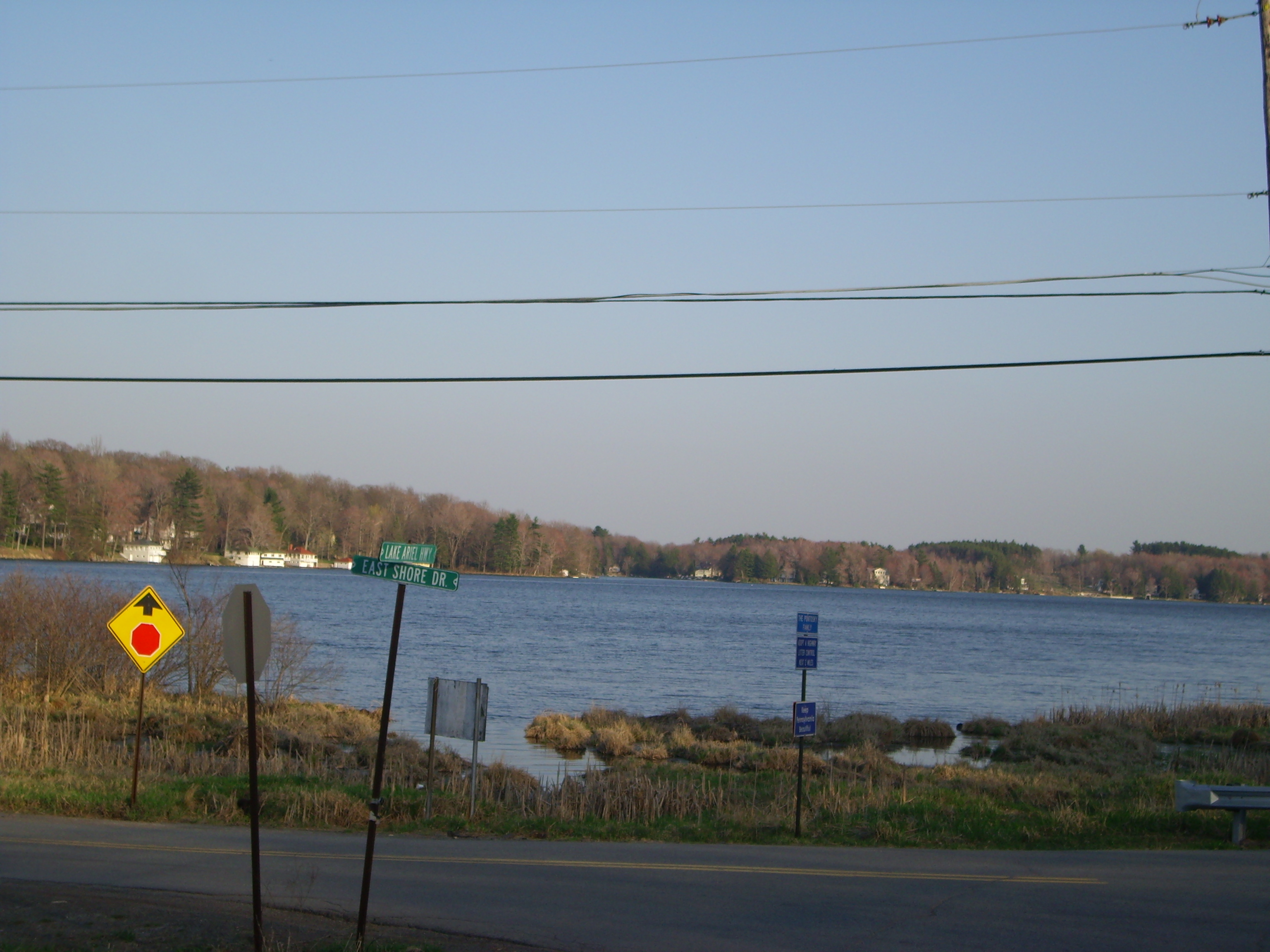
- Lake Ariel in the autumn.
- Nickname: Ariel
- Location in Pennsylvania Location in United States
- Coordinates: 41°27′14″N 75°22′58″W
- country: United States
- State: Pennsylvania
- U.S. Congressional District: PA-08
- School District: Western Wayne; Region II
- County: Wayne
- Magisterial District: 22-3-01
- Township: Lake
- Settled: 1848
- Founder: Mr. Wilcox
- Named for: Lake Ariel
- Elevation: 1,434 ft (437 m)
- Time zone: UTC-5 (Eastern (EST))
  - Summer (DST): UTC-4 (Eastern Daylight (EDT))
- ZIP code: 18436
- Area codes: 570 and 272
- GNIS feature ID: 1199892
- FIPS code: 42-127-40936-40944
- Waterways: Ariel Creek, Lake Ariel, Brooks Lake, Deerfield Lake, Roamingwood Lake, Wildwood Lake
- Website: Lake Ariel

Lake Ariel is a village in Lake and Salem Townships of Wayne County, Pennsylvania, United States. Lake Ariel is part of The Pocono Mountain region.

Located in northeastern Pennsylvania in the Poconos, Lake Ariel was founded by settlers with the name of Jones, and was previously known as Jonestown. Following a name change, Lake Ariel became home to Lake Ariel Park, a major tourist destination for Pennsylvanians in the late 19th and early 20th centuries.

== History ==
First settled in 1822 by the Jones family, the town was first called The Stock Farm and later Jonestown or Jones Pond. The first farm was located at the south end of the lake. Although when the village was first settled, it was populated by only a few family farms, Jonestown soon expanded due to the Pennsylvania Coal Company's Gravity Railroad. It brought workers and soon businesses were needed to fulfil their needs, including a post office named Ariel, which would later lead to the change in name of the town.

=== Lake Ariel Park ===
Lake Ariel Park was a major destination for many in the late 19th and early 20th centuries.

Since the late 19th century through the 20th century, Lake Ariel has had various thriving businesses. There were numerous sawmills, and Lake Ariel also had different factories such as a cheese factory and a chair factory. Many locals also held jobs at the ice houses and Lake Ariel Park. Lake Ariel Park was a major tourist area for the community. It contained a pavilion for picnics and dancing. There were also rides such as a waterslide, a rollercoaster called the Cyclone, carousels, and miniature train rides. The park also had a beach where visitors could go swimming or boating. The owners of Lake Ariel Park also purchased an airplane so that their visitors could pay to get rides in the plane. The Lake Ariel Park also led to the increased popularity of the Lake Ariel Hotel which was formerly known as the Columbia Hotel. The Lake Ariel Hotel stood in disrepair for many years until it was finally torn down in 2011. Unfortunately, the Lake Ariel Park had a worse fate. Due to summer hurricanes and bad winters the park had to be closed down in the early 1950s. Some businesses did withstand the test of time. John T. Howe started his gas station in 1919, the business was passed down to his son and is still in business today. It now is called Howe Convenient Market. It is a gas station and store but it is not in the original building. Another business that had a few changes but is still running today is the Wayne Garage. It was built in 1915, making it the oldest business in Lake Ariel. After it was sold to new owners in 1958 it was changed to a body shop and remains one today.

The original St. Thomas More was dedicated in 1942. In 1996 the construction for the expansion of the church began; the rectory was torn down and rebuilt across the street, the church was converted into a steeple and offices and a new, larger church was built connected to it. A church from the past that remains unchanged today is the Avoy Christian Church, not only is it still standing but it still has services on Sunday. The Gravity Pentecostal Church is also still intact today, but it is now used as a house.

The Lake Ariel Elementary school has gone through many changes in its time. The original building is no longer the educational institute. The building known today as the Lake Ariel Elementary School was formerly known as the Lake Consolidated School. It was built in 1936 and in the 1950s in held the grades kindergarten through 12th. Since a new high school was built in Varden in 1973 it has been used solely as an elementary school. The Lake Ariel Elementary School closed down in 2011, after a new elementary school was built in a nearby town. The building was demolished in mid to late 2016

=== Present day ===
The center of Lake Ariel is the setting of most of the community's businesses, although there are numerous others.

Lake Ariel also contains many churches and religious institutions. St. Thomas More's Catholic Church is located in the center of the community, while several Protestant churches are located at various places in the community.

In Lake Ariel, there was the Lake Ariel Elementary School. Children from third to fifth grade attended this school. It was part of the Western Wayne School District which also has schools in the nearby communities of Waymart, Hamlin, and Varden. It was torn down in 2016.

Western Wayne's newest school, Evergreen Elementary, opened August 31, 2011. It is located on Route 191 between Lake Ariel and Hamlin. The school replaced Lake Ariel Elementary and Hamlin Elementary and houses pre-k through fifth grade. According to the Western Wayne School District website the projected cost of the school was $18 million. The new facility is the premier 'green' school in the state. The school attained the Leadership in Energy and Environmental Design Silver Certification for its use of geo-thermal heating and cooling, and solar and wind energy.

== Media ==
WCRV 97.7FM is a low-powered station serving Lake Ariel, Cherry Ridge, and Southern Honesdale.

== Gallery ==
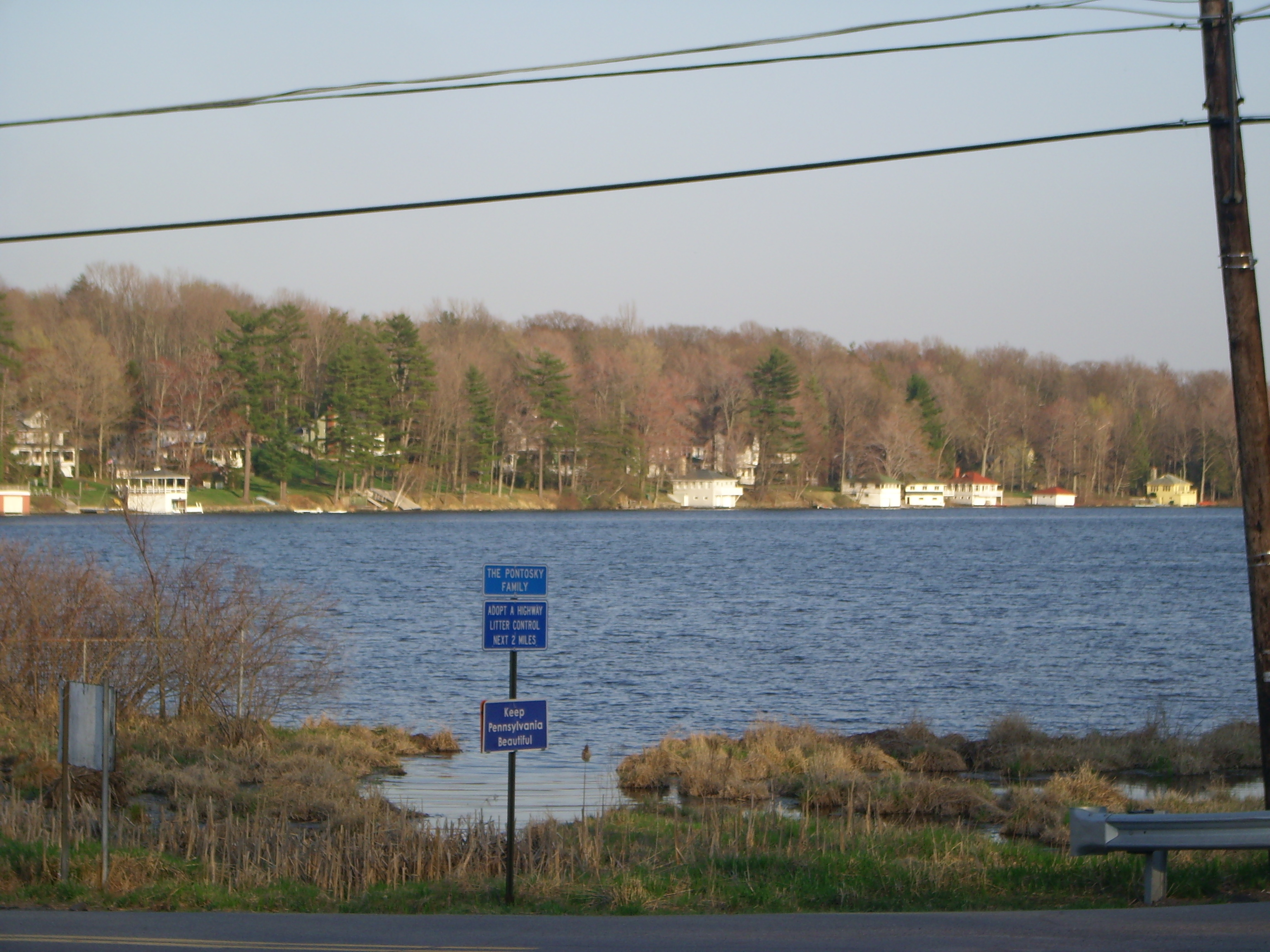

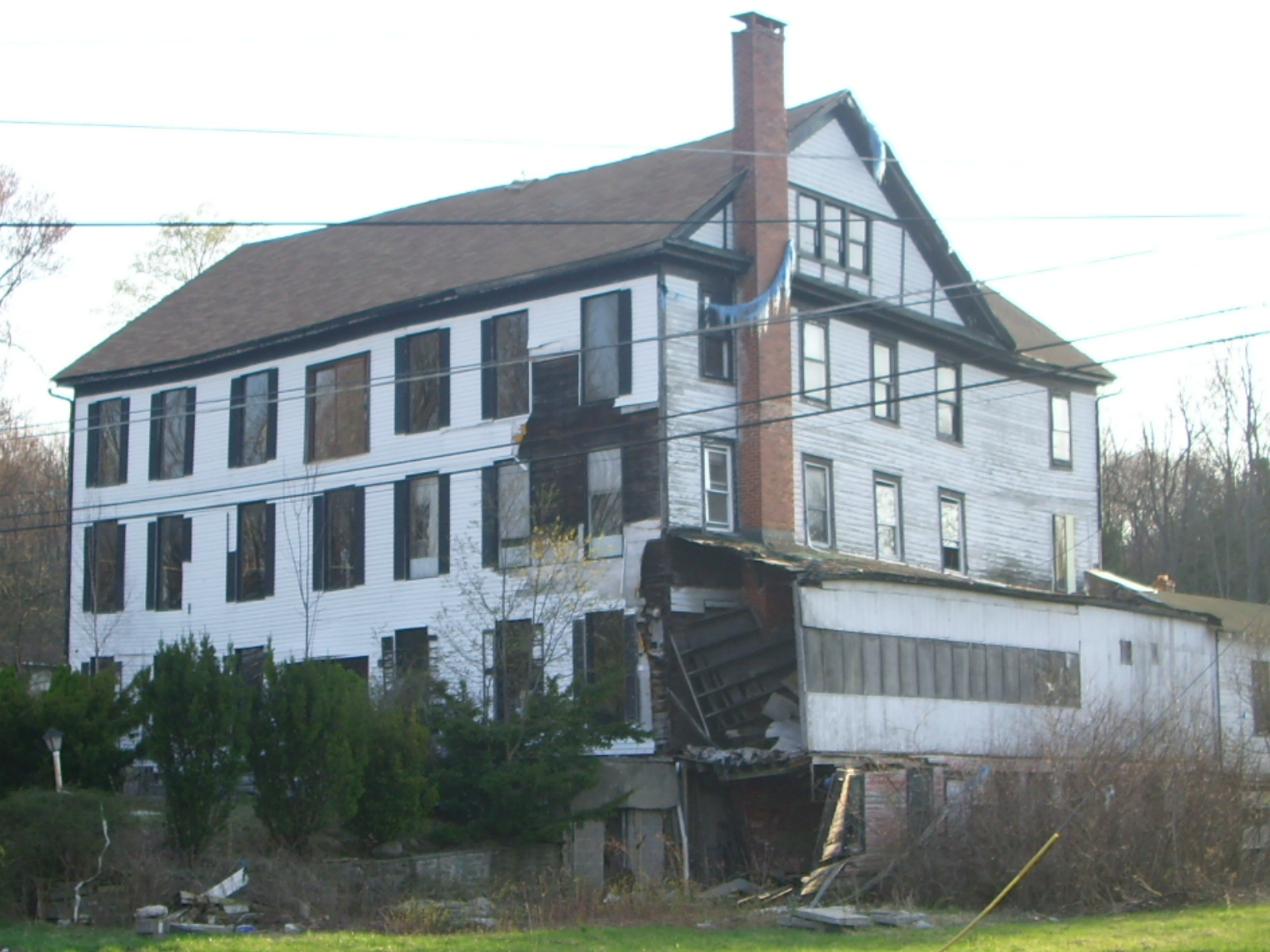
The Lake Ariel Hotel in recent years. It was torn down in 2011

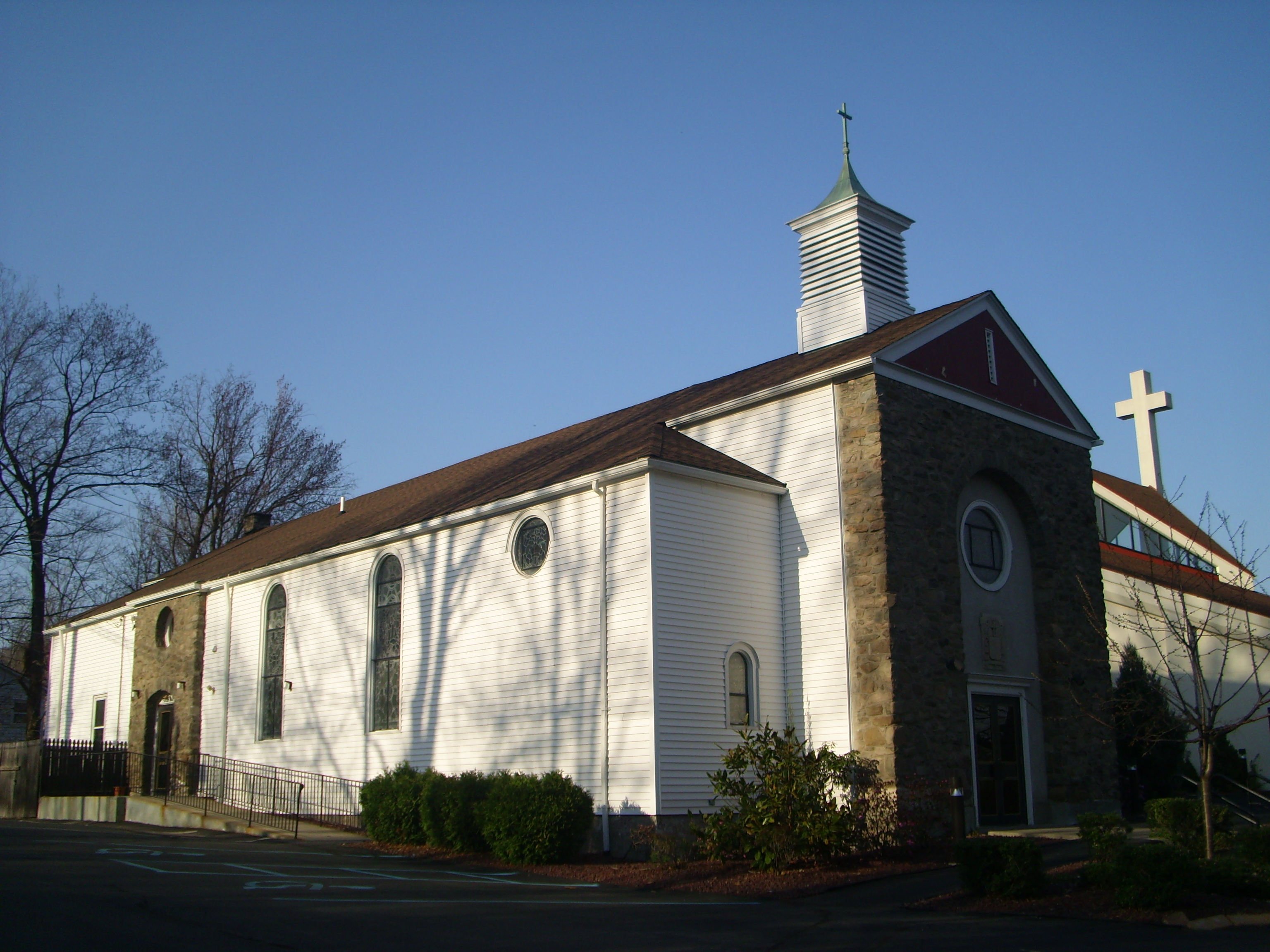
The original Saint Thomas More Catholic Church in Lake Ariel, the new church is in the background

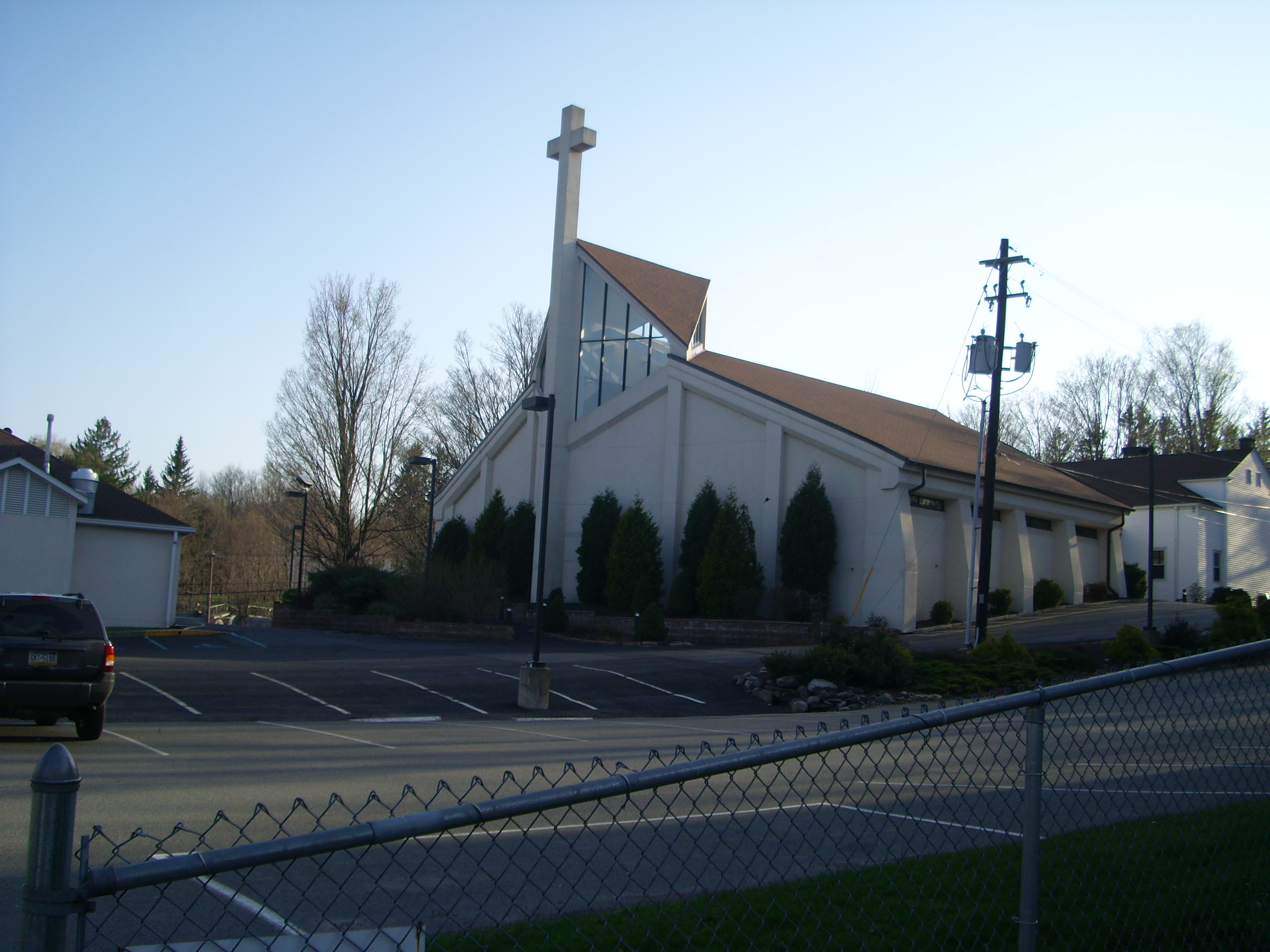
The new Saint Thomas More Catholic Church

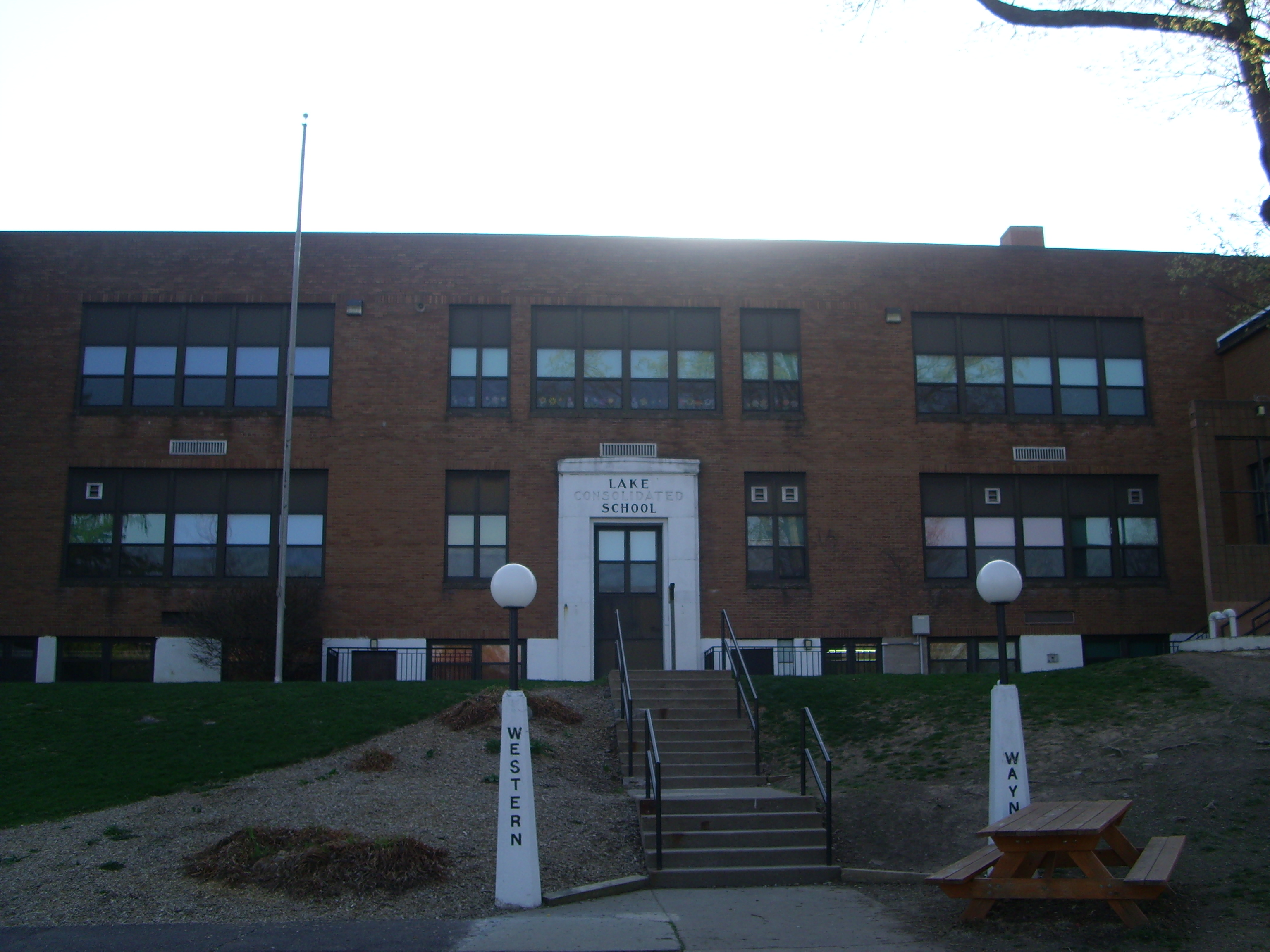
The Lake Ariel Elementary School
