= Lehigh Township, Wayne County, Pennsylvania =

Township in Pennsylvania, US

Lehigh Township
- Township
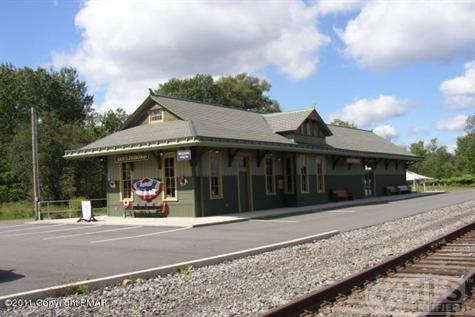
- Gouldsboro train station

- Location in Wayne County and the state of Pennsylvania.

- Location of Pennsylvania in the United States
- Coordinates: 41°14′00″N 75°30′05″W
- Country: United States
- State: Pennsylvania
- County: Wayne

Area
  - Total: 12.61 sq mi (32.67 km^{2})
  - Land: 12.02 sq mi (31.12 km^{2})
  - Water: 0.60 sq mi (1.56 km^{2})
- Elevation: 1,775 ft (541 m)

Population (2020)
  - Total: 1,876
  - Density: 147.4/sq mi (56.92/km^{2})
- Time zone: UTC-5 (EST)
  - Summer (DST): UTC-4 (EDT)
- Zip Code: 18424
- Area code: 570
- FIPS code: 42-127-42432
- Website: Lehigh Township

Lehigh Township is a second-class township in Wayne County, Pennsylvania. The township's population at the 2020 United States Census was 1,876, down slightly from 1,881 at the time of the 2010 United States Census.

== Geography ==
According to the U.S. Census Bureau, the township has a total area of 12.6 square miles (33 km^{2}), of which 12.0 square miles (31 km^{2}) is land and 0.6 square miles (1.6 km^{2}) (4.76%) is water. It contains parts of the census-designated places of Big Bass Lake, Gouldsboro, and Pocono Springs.

== Demographics ==
Historical population
Census	Pop.	Note	%±
2010	1,881		—
2020	1,876		−0.3%
U.S. Decennial Census

As of the census of 2010, there were 1,881 people, 775 households, and 529 families residing in the township. The population density was 156.8 inhabitants per square mile (60.5/km^{2}). There were 1,652 housing units at an average density of 137.7 per square mile (53.2/km^{2}). The racial makeup of the township was 94.3% White, 2.2% African American, 0.06% Native American, 1% Asian, 1% from other races, and 1.4% from two or more races. Hispanic or Latino of any race were 4% of the population.

There were 775 households, out of which 22.8% had children under the age of 18 living with them, 53% were married couples living together, 9.7% had a female householder with no husband present, and 31.7% were non-families. 26.1% of all households were made up of individuals, and 10.5% had someone living alone who was 65 years of age or older. The average household size was 2.43 and the average family size was 2.89.

In the township the population was spread out, with 19.1% under the age of 18, 64.6% from 18 to 64, and 16.3% who were 65 years of age or older. The median age was 47.2 years.

The median income for a household in the township was $35,302, and the median income for a family was $41,071. Males had a median income of $33,750 versus $22,219 for females. The per capita income for the township was $15,910. About 6.7% of families and 10.7% of the population were below the poverty line, including 11.7% of those under age 18 and 16.3% of those age 65 or over.

== Schools ==
Children who reside in Lehigh Township in Wayne County are entitled to attend public schools in the North Pocono School District, which is headquartered in neighboring Lackawanna County.
