= Canaan Township, Pennsylvania =

Township in Pennsylvania, US

Canaan, Pennsylvania
- Second-class township
- Township of Canaan
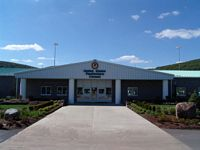
- The United States Penitentiary, Canaan (USP Canaan), in Farview.

- Location in Wayne County and the state of Pennsylvania.
- Country: United States
- State: Pennsylvania
- US Congressional District: PA-8
- State Senatorial District: 20
- State House of Representatives District: 115
- County: Wayne
- School District: Western Wayne; Region I
- Settled: 1783
- Incorporated: March 21, 1798 (original township of Wayne County)
- Founder: John Shaffer
- Named for: Canaan (biblical name for the Levant)

Government
  - Type: Board of Supervisors
  - Board of Supervisors: Supervisors: Lewis C. Henshaw; Chester O'Connell; Ronald Shemanski
  - US Representative: Matt Cartwright (D)
  - State Senator: Lisa Baker (R)
  - State Representative: Frank Farina (R)

Area
  - Total: 19.19 sq mi (49.71 km^{2})
  - Land: 18.26 sq mi (47.29 km^{2})
  - Water: 0.94 sq mi (2.43 km^{2})
- Elevation: 1,568 ft (477.9 m)

Population (2020)
  - Total: 3,610
  - Density: 197.7/sq mi (76.34/km^{2})
- Time zone: UTC-5 (Eastern (EST))
  - Summer (DST): UTC-4 (Eastern Daylight (EDT))
- Area code: 570
- GNIS feature ID: 1217214
- FIPS code: 42-127-11056
- Website: canaanpa.com

Canaan is a second-class township in Wayne County, Pennsylvania, United States. The township's population was 3,610 at the time of the 2020 United States Census.

== Geography ==
According to the United States Census Bureau, the township has a total area of 19.2 square miles (50 km^{2}), of which 18.3 square miles (47 km^{2}) is land and 0.9 square miles (2.3 km^{2}) (4.88%) is water.

== Communities ==
The following villages are located in Canaan Township:

- Canaan
- Farview
- Fermoy
- Keen
- Steene

== Demographics ==
Historical population
Census	Pop.	Note	%±
2010	3,963		—
2020	3,610		−8.9%
U.S. Decennial Census

As of the census of 2010, there were 3,963 people, 359 households, and 267 families residing in the township. The population density was 215.4 inhabitants per square mile (83.2/km^{2}). There were 420 housing units at an average density of 22.8 units per square mile (8.8 units/km^{2}). The racial makeup of the township was 60.3% White, 29.4% African American, 1.1% Native American, 0.6% Asian, 6.8% from other races, and 1.8% from two or more races. Hispanic or Latino of any race were 13.6% of the population.

There were 359 households, out of which 24% had children under the age of 18 living with them, 58.8% were married couples living together, 8.9% had a female householder with no husband present, and 25.6% were non-families. 21.4% of all households were made up of individuals, and 8.3% had someone living alone who was 65 years of age or older. The average household size was 2.49 and the average family size was 2.87.

In the township the population was spread out, with 4.3% under the age of 18, 89% from 18 to 64, and 6.7% who were 65 years of age or older. The median age was 40 years.

The median income for a household in the township was $37,614, and the median income for a family was $41,750. Males had a median income of $21,986 versus $19,632 for females. The per capita income for the township was $15,460. About 2.1% of families and 3.1% of the population were below the poverty line, including 4.8% of those under age 18 and 1.7% of those age 65 or over.

The sharp increase in population (204%) in part can be attributed to the federal prison in Canaan Township, which was opened in March 2005. The prison currently has a capacity of housing 1,088 inmates. Another cause for spike in population in the township can be attributed to the State Correctional Institution – Waymart, which has a capacity of housing 1,470 inmates.

== Government and infrastructure ==
The Federal Bureau of Prisons United States Penitentiary, Canaan and the Pennsylvania Department of Corrections State Correctional Institution Waymart are in the township.

== Education ==
The school district is Western Wayne School District.
