= Lake Township, Wayne County, Pennsylvania =

Township in Pennsylvania, US

Lake, Pennsylvania
- Second-class township
- Township of Lake
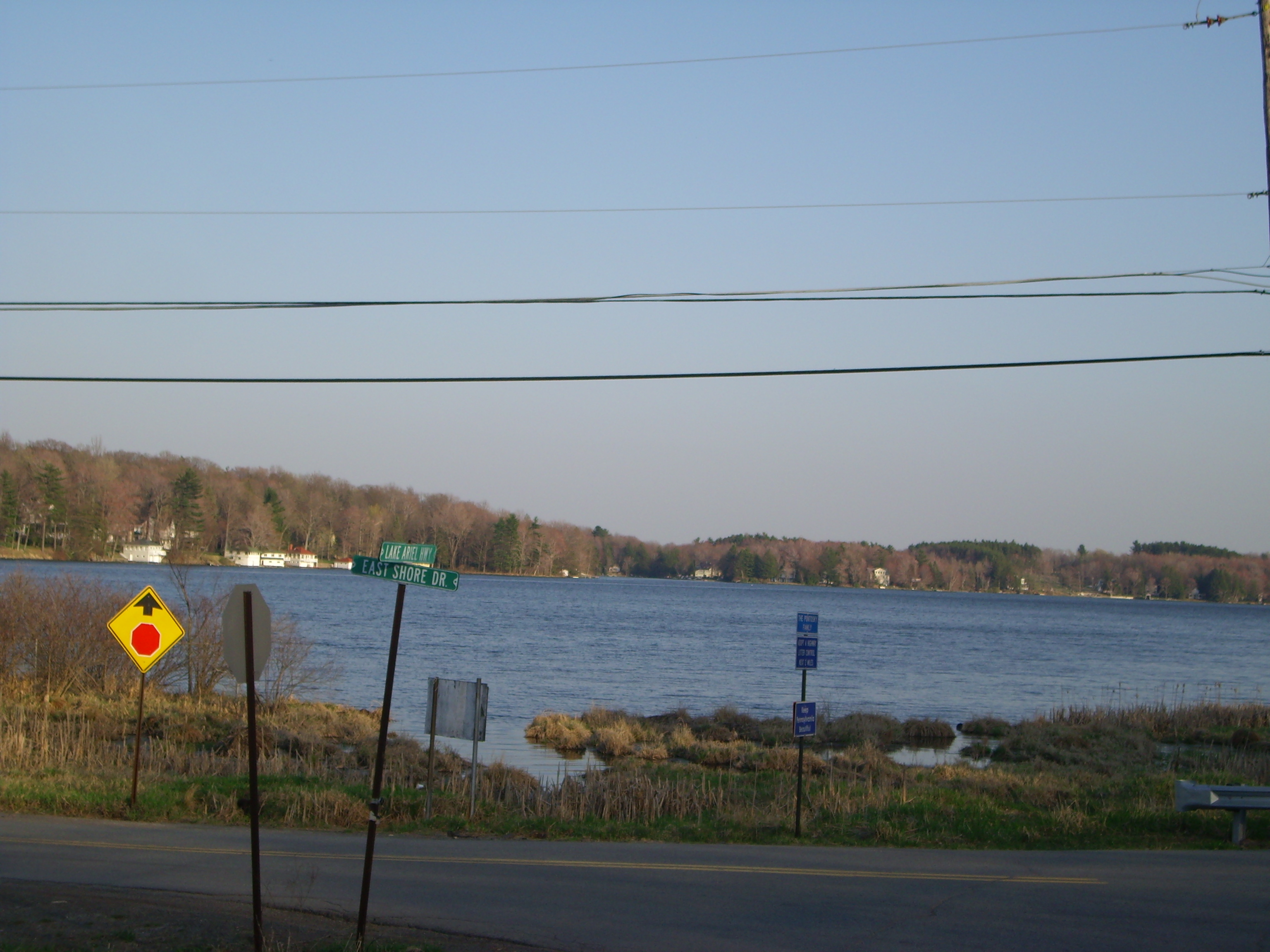
- Lake Ariel in the Village of Lake Ariel in the autumn.

- Location in Wayne County and the state of Pennsylvania.
- Country: United States
- State: Pennsylvania
- US Congressional District: PA-8
- State Senatorial District: 20
- State House of Representatives District: 111
- County: Wayne
- School District: Western Wayne; Region II
- Incorporated: 1876
- Named after: Abundance of lakes in the area

Government
  - Type: Board of Supervisors
  - Board of Supervisors: Supervisors: Robert F. Peters; Scottie J. Swingle; Fredric Birmelin
  - US Representative: Matt Cartwright (D)
  - State Senator: Lisa Baker (R)
  - State Representative: Jonathan Fritz (R)

Area
  - Total: 29.84 sq mi (77.29 km^{2})
  - Land: 27.80 sq mi (71.99 km^{2})
  - Water: 2.05 sq mi (5.30 km^{2})
- Elevation: 1,470 ft (448 m)

Population (2010)
  - Total: 5,269
  - Estimate (2016): 5,082
  - Density: 182.8/sq mi (70.59/km^{2})
- Time zone: UTC-5 (Eastern (EST))
  - Summer (DST): UTC-4 (Eastern Daylight (EDT))
- Area code: 570
- GNIS feature ID: 1217220
- FIPS code: 42-127-40936
- Website: https://laketwpwayne.com/

Lake is a second-class township in Wayne County, Pennsylvania, United States. The township's population was 5,269 at the time of the 2010 United States Census.

== Geography ==
According to the United States Census Bureau, the township has a total area of 29.8 square miles (77 km^{2}), of which 27.8 square miles (72 km^{2}) is land and 2.0 square miles (5.2 km^{2}) (6.71%) is water.

== Communities ==
The following villages are located in Lake Township:

- Avoy
- Gravity
- The Hideout (part)
- Lake Ariel (also called Ariel)
- Maplewood
- Pink
- Tresslarville(also called Tresslers Corners)
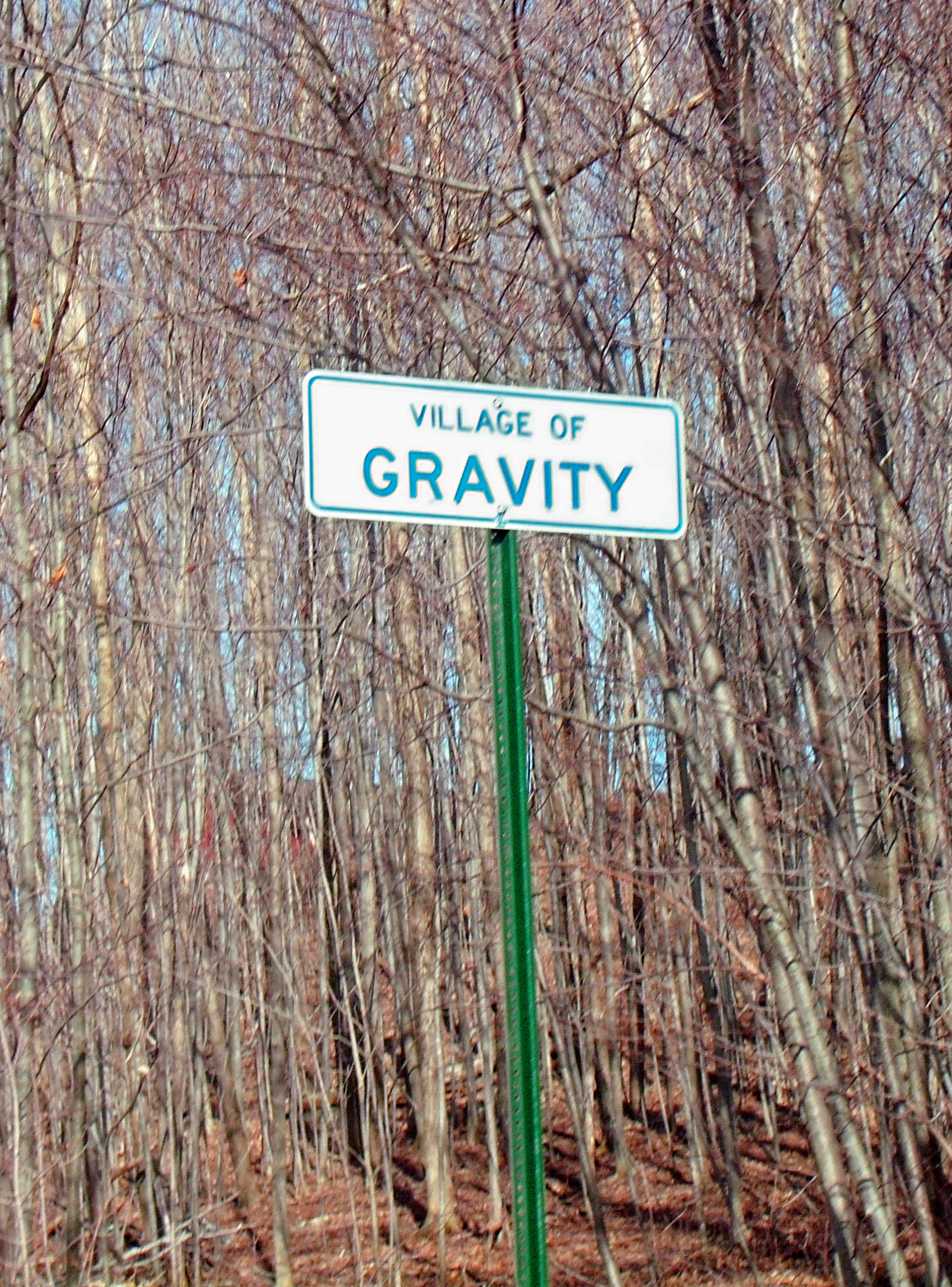
Village of Gravity

== Demographics ==
Historical population
Census	Pop.	Note	%±
2010	5,269		—
2016 (est.)	5,082		−3.5%
U.S. Decennial Census

As of the census of 2010, there were 5,269 people, 2,156 households, and 1,511 families residing in the township. The population density was 189.5 inhabitants per square mile (73.2/km^{2}). There were 4,009 housing units at an average density of 144.2 per square mile (55.7/km^{2}). The racial makeup of the township was 96% White, 1.6% African American, 0.2% Native American, 0.4% Asian, 0.7% from other races, and 1.1% from two or more races. Hispanic or Latino of any race were 2.9% of the population.

There were 2,156 households, out of which 21% had children under the age of 18 living with them, 58.7% were married couples living together, 7.9% had a female householder with no husband present, and 29.9% were non-families. 24.4% of all households were made up of individuals, and 10.6% had someone living alone who was 65 years of age or older. The average household size was 2.39 and the average family size was 2.83.

In the township the population was spread out, with 19% under the age of 18, 57.8% from 18 to 64, and 23.2% who were 65 years of age or older. The median age was 49 years.

The median income for a household in the township was $33,887, and the median income for a family was $37,821. Males had a median income of $29,609 versus $21,406 for females. The per capita income for the township was $16,274. About 8.7% of families and 10.5% of the population were below the poverty line, including 13.8% of those under age 18 and 12.8% of those age 65 or over.
