= Wayne County, Pennsylvania =

County in Pennsylvania, United States

- County
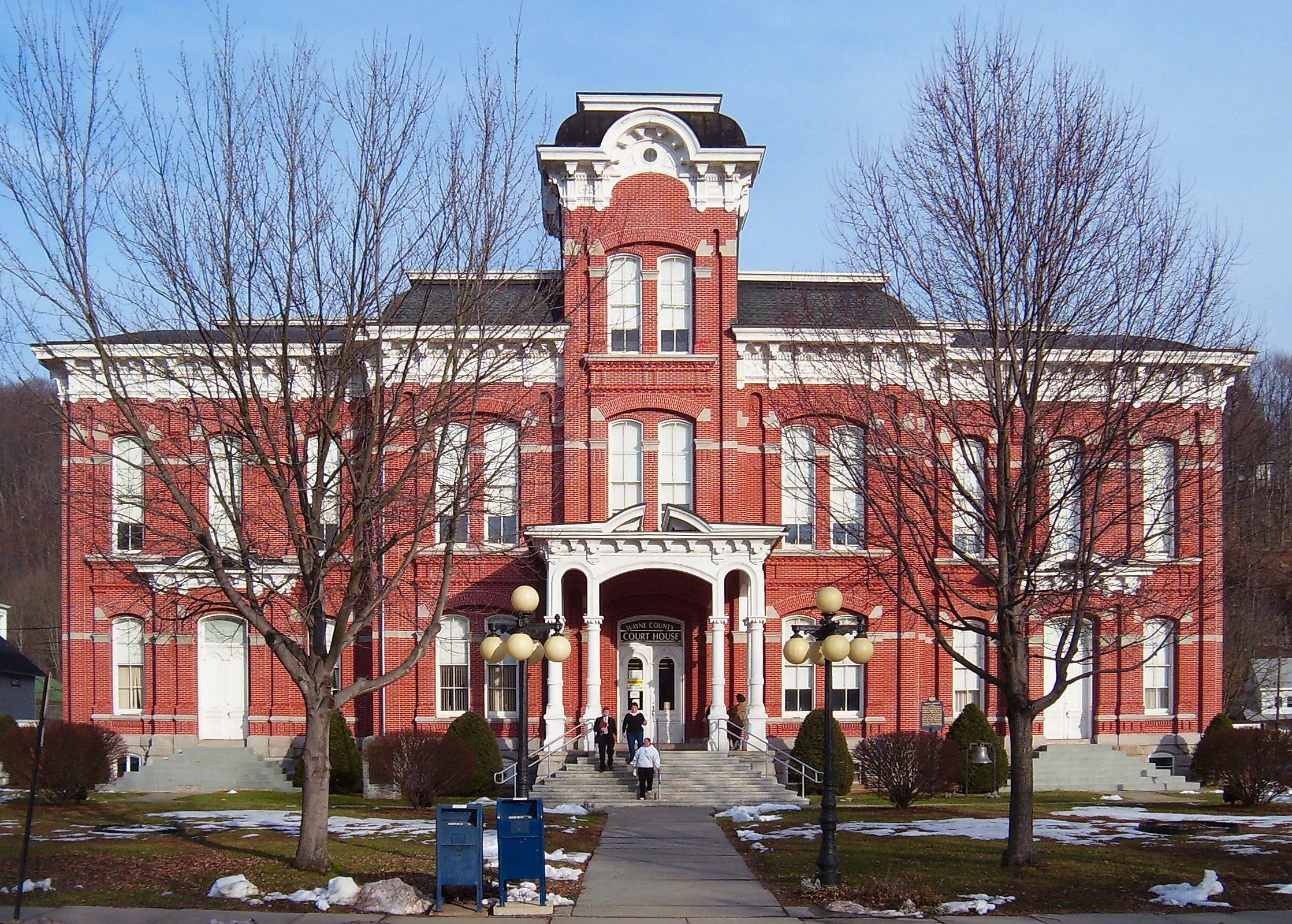
- The Wayne County Courthouse in Honesdale

- Logo

- Location within the U.S. state of Pennsylvania
- Coordinates: 41°39′N 75°19′W
- Country: United States
- State: Pennsylvania
- Founded: March 21, 1798
- Named for: Anthony Wayne
- Seat: Honesdale
- Largest borough: Honesdale

Area
  - Total: 751 sq mi (1,950 km^{2})
  - Land: 726 sq mi (1,880 km^{2})
  - Water: 25 sq mi (65 km^{2}) 3.3%

Population (2020)
  - Total: 51,155
  - Estimate (2025): 51,703 ▲
  - Density: 70.5/sq mi (27.2/km^{2})
- Time zone: UTC−5 (Eastern)
  - Summer (DST): UTC−4 (EDT)
- Congressional district: 8th
- Website: waynecountypa.gov

Wayne County is a county in the Commonwealth of Pennsylvania. The county's population was 51,155 at the 2020 census. The county seat is the Borough of Honesdale. The county was formed from part of Northampton County on March 21, 1798, and was named for the Revolutionary War General Anthony Wayne. The county is part of the Northeast Pennsylvania and Pocono Mountains region of the state. (Note: Includes Luzerne, Lackawanna, Monroe, Schuylkill, Carbon, Pike, Wayne, Susquehanna, Wyoming and Sullivan Counties)

Wayne County is economically, historically, and infrastructurally linked to (and sometimes considered a part of) the New York metropolitan area. The Lehigh River, a 109-mile-long (175 km) tributary of the Delaware River, begins in the southern part of the county.

== Geography ==
According to the U.S. Census Bureau, Wayne County has a total area of 751 square miles (1,950 km^{2}), of which 726 square miles (1,880 km^{2}) is land and 25 square miles (65 km^{2}) (3.3%) is water.

The terrain of the county is varied. In the wider northern half, the land is rugged along its border with New York State, while the southern portion tends to be swampier. Higher hills and mountains are predominantly found along the county's western edge, while lower ones are more common in the east, near the Delaware River. The middle section of Wayne County is a wide plain.

The highest elevation in the county, 2,659 ft (810 m), is the summit of Mount Ararat in Orson. Two other summits at the north end of the same ridge also exceed 2,640 ft (800 m) in elevation. The county's lowest point, at approximately 680 ft (210 m) above sea level, is along the Delaware, near Wayne County's border with Pike County, Pennsylvania.

Most of Wayne County is drained by the Delaware (which separates Pennsylvania from New York), with the exception of a few small areas in the western part of the county, which are drained by either the Starrucca Creek or the Lackawanna River (which both eventually flow into the Susquehanna River).

The county has a warm-summer humid continental climate (Dfb) and average monthly temperatures in Honesdale range from 22.8 °F in January to 67.9 °F in July.

=== Adjacent counties ===
- Broome County, New York (north)
- Delaware County, New York (northeast)
- Sullivan County, New York (east)
- Pike County (southeast)
- Monroe County (south)
- Lackawanna County (southwest)
- Susquehanna County (west)

=== Major highways ===
- I-84
- I-380
- US 6
- PA 170
- PA 191
- PA 196
- PA 247
- PA 296
- PA 348
- PA 370
- PA 371
- PA 423
- PA 435
- PA 447
- PA 507
- PA 590
- PA 652
- PA 670
- PA 690

== Demographics ==
Historical population
Census	Pop.	Note	%±
1800	2,562		—
1810	4,125		61.0%
1820	4,127		0.0%
1830	7,663		85.7%
1840	11,848		54.6%
1850	21,890		84.8%
1860	32,239		47.3%
1870	33,188		2.9%
1880	33,513		1.0%
1890	31,010		−7.5%
1900	30,171		−2.7%
1910	29,236		−3.1%
1920	27,435		−6.2%
1930	28,420		3.6%
1940	29,934		5.3%
1950	28,478		−4.9%
1960	28,237		−0.8%
1970	29,581		4.8%
1980	35,237		19.1%
1990	39,944		13.4%
2000	47,722		19.5%
2010	52,822		10.7%
2020	51,155		−3.2%
2025 (est.)	51,703	▲	1.1%
U.S. Decennial Census; 1790–1960 1900–1990; 1990–2000 2010–2017 2010-2020

=== Racial and ethnic composition ===
Wayne County, Pennsylvania – Racial and ethnic composition Note: the US Census treats Hispanic/Latino as an ethnic category. This table excludes Latinos from the racial categories and assigns them to a separate category. Hispanics/Latinos may be of any race.
Race / Ethnicity (NH = Non-Hispanic)	Pop 1980	Pop 1990	Pop 2000	Pop 2010	Pop 2020	% 1980	% 1990	% 2000	% 2010	% 2020
White alone (NH)	34,911	39,153	45,647	48,590	44,821	99.07%	98.02%	95.65%	91.99%	87.62%
Black or African American alone (NH)	78	276	731	1,563	1,647	0.22%	0.69%	1.53%	2.96%	3.22%
Native American or Alaska Native alone (NH)	24	42	67	85	73	0.07%	0.11%	0.14%	0.16%	0.14%
Asian alone (NH)	49	94	178	252	418	0.14%	0.24%	0.37%	0.48%	0.82%
Native Hawaiian or Pacific Islander alone (NH)	x	x	1	3	0	x	x	0.00%	0.01%	0.00%
Other race alone (NH)	14	8	12	32	165	0.04%	0.02%	0.03%	0.06%	0.32%
Mixed race or Multiracial (NH)	x	x	275	481	1,684	x	x	0.58%	0.91%	3.29%
Hispanic or Latino (any race)	161	371	811	1,816	2,347	0.46%	0.93%	1.70%	3.44%	4.59%
Total	35,237	39,944	47,722	52,822	51,155	100.00%	100.00%	100.00%	100.00%	100.00%

=== 2020 census ===
As of the 2020 census, the county had a population of 51,155. The median age was 49.1 years. 16.7% of residents were under the age of 18 and 24.6% of residents were 65 years of age or older. For every 100 females there were 110.9 males, and for every 100 females age 18 and over there were 111.7 males age 18 and over.

The racial makeup of the county was 89.5% White, 3.4% Black or African American, 0.2% American Indian and Alaska Native, 0.8% Asian, <0.1% Native Hawaiian and Pacific Islander, 1.2% from some other race, and 4.9% from two or more races. Hispanic or Latino residents of any race comprised 4.6% of the population.

13.8% of residents lived in urban areas, while 86.2% lived in rural areas.

There were 20,794 households in the county, of which 22.9% had children under the age of 18 living in them. Of all households, 50.0% were married-couple households, 19.8% were households with a male householder and no spouse or partner present, and 23.3% were households with a female householder and no spouse or partner present. About 29.3% of all households were made up of individuals and 15.1% had someone living alone who was 65 years of age or older.

There were 31,910 housing units, of which 34.8% were vacant. Among occupied housing units, 79.5% were owner-occupied and 20.5% were renter-occupied. The homeowner vacancy rate was 2.2% and the rental vacancy rate was 6.9%.

=== 2010 census ===
As of the Census of 2010, there were 52,822 people, 20,625 households, and 13,952 families in Wayne County. The county's population density was 72.797 people per square mile (28.107 people/km^{2}), and there were 31,653 housing units at an average density of 43.623 per square mile (16.843/km^{2}). The racial makeup of the populace was 94.2% White, 3.1% African American, 0.2% Native American, 0.5% Asian, 0.0% Pacific Islander, 0.9% of other races, and 1.1% of two or more races. Hispanics and Latinos of all races made up 3.4% of the population.

67.6% of Wayne County's households were families, 53.9% were headed by a heterosexual married couple (Pennsylvania did not allow same-sex marriage until May 20, 2014, after the 2010 Census had been completed), and 26.6% included children under the age of 18. 9.2% of households were headed by a female householder with no husband present, 4.5% by a male householder with no wife present, and 32.4% consisted of non-families. 27.2% of all households were made up of individuals, and 12.3% consisted of a person 65 years of age or older living alone. The average household size was 2.38 and the average family size was 2.87.

Wayne County's age distribution was 21.1% under the age of 18, 4.5% between the ages of 18 and 24, 23.1% between 25 and 44, 32.4% between 45 and 64, and 19.0% 65 years of age or older. The population's median age was 45.9 years. For every 100 females, there were 110 males. For every 100 females age 18 and over, there were 112 males in the same age range.

=== American Community Survey ===
According to American Community Survey (ACS) estimates, the median income for a household in Wayne County in 2013 was $49,313, and the median income for a family was $58,934. Males had a median income of $36,173, while females had a median income of $23,636. The per capita income for the county was $24,005. 8.4% of families and 12.2% of people were below the Census Bureau's poverty thresholds (different from the federally defined poverty guidelines), including 18.5% of those under age 18 and 7.6% of those age 65 or over.

According to self-reported ancestry figures recorded by the ACS, the five largest ancestral groups in Wayne County in 2013 were Germans (30.3%), Irish (22.1%), Italians (13.9%), English (10.9%), and Poles (10.1%). Those reporting American ancestry made up 8.6% of the population.

== Politics ==
United States presidential election results for Wayne County, Pennsylvania
Year	Republican		Democratic		Third party(ies)	
Year	No.	%	No.	%	No.	%
1888	2,939	46.47%	3,010	47.60%	375	5.93%
1892	2,690	44.41%	2,915	48.13%	452	7.46%
1896	3,708	56.59%	2,473	37.74%	371	5.66%
1900	3,229	50.91%	2,647	41.74%	466	7.35%
1904	3,386	56.85%	2,097	35.21%	473	7.94%
1908	3,650	56.67%	2,438	37.85%	353	5.48%
1912	659	12.29%	1,924	35.90%	2,777	51.81%
1916	2,869	55.84%	2,019	39.30%	250	4.87%
1920	5,164	73.14%	1,589	22.51%	307	4.35%
1924	5,578	72.87%	1,477	19.29%	600	7.84%
1928	8,576	72.78%	3,148	26.72%	59	0.50%
1932	6,215	61.47%	3,666	36.26%	230	2.27%
1936	9,347	65.00%	4,864	33.82%	169	1.18%
1940	9,203	72.44%	3,460	27.24%	41	0.32%
1944	8,242	74.43%	2,793	25.22%	39	0.35%
1948	7,708	77.14%	2,284	22.86%	0	0.00%
1952	9,623	78.96%	2,530	20.76%	34	0.28%
1956	9,658	75.64%	3,092	24.22%	18	0.14%
1960	9,360	67.77%	4,425	32.04%	26	0.19%
1964	6,512	52.82%	5,781	46.89%	35	0.28%
1968	7,827	66.39%	3,176	26.94%	787	6.68%
1972	8,948	74.51%	2,733	22.76%	328	2.73%
1976	7,811	63.45%	4,244	34.48%	255	2.07%
1980	8,468	67.48%	3,375	26.90%	705	5.62%
1984	10,061	75.66%	3,155	23.73%	81	0.61%
1988	9,926	71.61%	3,775	27.23%	161	1.16%
1992	8,184	48.65%	4,817	28.64%	3,821	22.71%
1996	8,077	49.45%	5,928	36.29%	2,329	14.26%
2000	11,201	59.21%	6,904	36.50%	811	4.29%
2004	13,713	62.43%	8,060	36.69%	194	0.88%
2008	12,702	55.39%	9,892	43.14%	338	1.47%
2012	12,896	59.50%	8,396	38.74%	382	1.76%
2016	16,244	67.63%	7,008	29.18%	766	3.19%
2020	18,637	66.21%	9,191	32.65%	319	1.13%
2024	20,071	68.00%	9,150	31.00%	295	1.00%

United States Senate election results for Wayne County, Pennsylvania1
Year	Republican		Democratic		Third party(ies)	
Year	No.	%	No.	%	No.	%
1994	7,687	64.28%	3,974	33.23%	297	2.48%
2000	11,762	66.74%	5,526	31.36%	335	1.90%
2006	8,400	53.52%	7,294	46.48%	0	0.00%
2012	12,276	57.10%	8,791	40.89%	433	2.01%
2018	12,269	60.85%	7,625	37.82%	268	1.33%
2024	19,331	65.90%	9,385	31.99%	619	2.11%

United States Senate election results for Wayne County, Pennsylvania3
Year	Republican		Democratic		Third party(ies)	
Year	No.	%	No.	%	No.	%
1992	8,806	54.94%	6,437	40.16%	785	4.90%
1998	8,469	70.81%	3,105	25.96%	386	3.23%
2004	14,045	67.27%	6,055	29.00%	777	3.72%
2010	10,348	65.60%	5,426	34.40%	0	0.00%
2016	14,538	61.01%	7,487	31.42%	1,803	7.57%
2022	14,425	63.51%	7,669	33.77%	618	2.72%

Pennsylvania Gubernatorial election results for Wayne County
Year	Republican		Democratic		Third party(ies)	
Year	No.	%	No.	%	No.	%
1970	6,669	65.91%	2,920	28.86%	530	5.24%
1974	6,204	64.90%	3,121	32.65%	234	2.45%
1978	7,016	72.52%	2,584	26.71%	74	0.76%
1982	6,396	65.68%	3,264	33.52%	78	0.80%
1986	5,718	53.46%	4,886	45.68%	92	0.86%
1990	3,503	37.29%	5,882	62.61%	9	0.10%
1994	7,430	60.38%	3,862	31.38%	1,014	8.24%
1998	8,692	70.57%	2,892	23.48%	732	5.94%
2002	8,118	62.56%	4,395	33.87%	463	3.57%
2006	7,635	48.39%	8,143	51.61%	0	0.00%
2010	10,747	67.87%	5,087	32.13%	0	0.00%
2014	7,621	55.60%	6,087	44.40%	0	0.00%
2018	11,751	58.50%	8,023	39.94%	312	1.55%
2022	13,868	60.98%	8,466	37.22%	409	1.80%

As of January 8, 2024, there were 35,181 registered voters in Wayne County, with the following party breakdown:

- Republican: 20,299 (57.70%)
- Democratic: 9,134 (25.96%)
- Other: 1,119 (3.18%)
- Non-affiliated: 4,629 (13.16%)
Chart of Voter Registration
1. Republican (57.7%)
2. Democratic (26.0%)
3. Independent (13.2%)
4. Other Parties (3.18%)

Wayne has long been one of the most Republican counties in Pennsylvania, as Republicans consistently win easily in federal, state and local elections. In 2000, Republican George W. Bush won 59.21 percent of the vote to Democrat Al Gore's 36.50 percent, and in 2004, Bush won with 62.43 percent to Democrat John Kerry's 36.69 percent. In 2008, Republican John McCain won with 55.39 percent of the vote to Democrat Barack Obama's 43.14 percent, and in 2012, Republican Mitt Romney won with 59.50 percent to Obama's 38.74 percent. In 2016, Republican Donald Trump won with 67.63 percent to Hillary Clinton's 29.18 percent.

Wayne County was one of the four counties that Barry Goldwater won in Pennsylvania in 1964; the last Democrat to win a plurality in the county was Grover Cleveland in 1892. Since then, only three Democrats have won even forty percent of the county's vote – William Jennings Bryan in 1900, Lyndon B. Johnson in 1964 and Barack H. Obama in 2008.

== Government and infrastructure ==
=== United States senators ===
- John Fetterman (senior senator), Democrat
- Dave McCormick (junior senator), Republican

=== United States representative ===
- Rob Bresnahan, Republican (PA-8)

=== State representatives ===
- Jonathan Fritz, Republican (111th district) - Buckingham, Clinton (partially), Lebanon, Manchester, Mount Pleasant, Oregon, Preston, and Scott Townships, and Starrucca Borough
- Jeffrey Olsommer (139th district) - Berlin, Cherry Ridge, Clinton (partially), Damascus, Dyberry, Palmyra, Paupack, South Canaan, and Texas Townships, and Bethany, Hawley, Honesdale, and Prompton Boroughs

=== State senator ===
- Lisa Baker, Republican (20th district)

=== County commissioners ===
- Brian W. Smith, Republican (Chairman)
- James Shook, Republican
- Jocelyn Cramer, Democrat

=== Other county officers ===
- Auditors: Carla J. Komar, Republican; Kathy Schloesser, Democrat; Catherine Jane Rickard, Republican
- Coroner: Edward R. Howell, Republican
- District Attorney: A.G. Howell, Republican
- Prothonotary: Edward "Ned" Sandercock, Republican
- Recorder of Deeds and Register of Wills: Debbie Bates, Republican
- Sheriff: Christopher Rosler, Republican
- Treasurer: Brian T. Field, Republican

=== Healthcare services ===
Wayne County is served by the Wayne Memorial Health System. The Health System consists of Wayne Memorial Hospital in Honesdale and several other subsidiaries and/or affiliates. In addition, the community has a number of physicians and other professionals providing needed care. The Farview State Hospital is located in Farview.

=== Emergency services ===
Paramedic services are provided by three different agencies:

- Wayne Ambulance, an affiliate of Lackawanna Ambulance (based in Scranton) which is owned by Community Health Systems, provides advanced life support and basic life support services to most of Wayne County, from a base in Honesdale.
- Cottage Hose Company / Mobile 9, based in Carbondale, Lackawanna County, provides advanced life support to all of Wayne County, as well as basic life support as a mutual aid or private service. They primarily respond to calls in Waymart and South Canaan and Clinton Townships, as this area adjoins their primary service area. They also service Forest City, Pennsylvania, which is located in Susquehanna County but dispatched through Wayne County due to their coverage of Browndale.
- Pike County Advanced Life Support / Mobile 401, has a sub-station in Hawley, provides Advanced Life Support services to a small western part of the Wayne County, including Hawley and Palmyra Township

BLS services are provided as dispatched through the Wayne County Communication Center. These agencies include:

- Damascus Township Volunteer Ambulance Corps, a volunteer ambulance corps, provides basic life support services in Damascus Township, along with 60% of Lebanon, 20% of Buckingham and all of Manchester township.
- Newfoundland Area Ambulance, a volunteer ambulance corps, provides basic life support services in Dreher Township, and portions of adjoining Sterling and Lehigh townships.
- Hawley Ambulance & Rescue Company provides BLS services.
- White Mills Community Ambulance provides BLS services.
- Northern Wayne Fire Company provides BLS service from their station on Route 370 in Lakewood.

Maplewood Fire and Rescue provides QRS "quick response service" to all medical calls in Lake townships.

=== Prisons ===
The Federal Bureau of Prisons United States Penitentiary, Canaan is in Canaan Township, near Waymart.

== Education ==
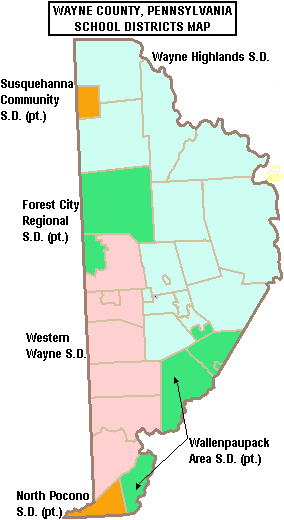
Map of Wayne County's school districts.

=== Public school districts ===
School districts include:

- Forest City Regional (also in Lackawanna and Susquehanna)
- North Pocono (also in Lackawanna)
- Susquehanna Community (also in Susquehanna)
- Wallenpaupack Area (also in Pike)
- Wayne Highlands
- Western Wayne

=== Private schools ===
There are five private or parochial schools in Wayne County:

- Canaan Christian Academy in Varden
- Saint Dominic's Academy in Honesdale

=== Libraries ===
The Wayne Library Alliance operates seven public libraries throughout the county:

- The Bethany Public Library in Bethany
- Hamlin Community Library in Hamlin
- The Hawley Public Library in Hawley
- The Newfoundland Area Public Library in Newfoundland
- The Northern Wayne Community Library in Lakewood
- The Pleasant Mount Public Library in Pleasant Mount
- The Wayne County Public Library in Honesdale

=== Seminaries ===
There is one seminary, St. Tikhon's Orthodox Theological Seminary in South Canaan.

== Communities ==
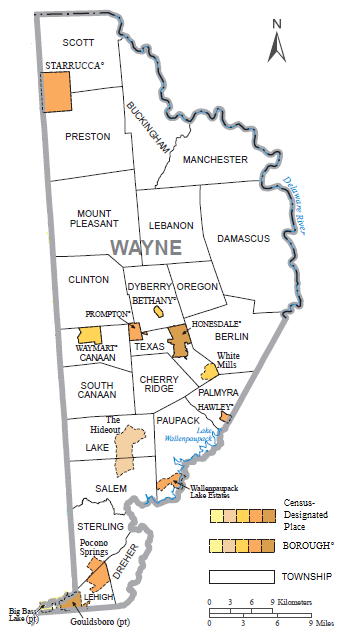
Map of Wayne County with municipalities and CDPs labeled.

Under Pennsylvania law, there are four types of incorporated municipalities: boroughs, cities, townships, and one town. Wayne County has only boroughs and townships. The latter type is classified based on population by the state government; all of its townships are second-class. A complete list of the county's municipalities follows:

=== Boroughs ===
- Bethany
- Hawley
- Honesdale (county seat)
- Prompton
- Starrucca (established as Wayne Borough in 1853; renamed in 1873)
- Waymart

=== Townships ===
- Berlin
- Buckingham
- Canaan
- Cherry Ridge
- Clinton
- Damascus
- Dreher
- Dyberry
- Lake
- Lebanon
- Lehigh
- Manchester
- Mount Pleasant
- Oregon
- Palmyra
- Paupack
- Preston
- Salem
- Scott
- South Canaan
- Sterling
- Texas

=== Census-designated places ===
In addition, Pennsylvania also has a few types of unincorporated communities, namely villages and private communities. Villages are unincorporated communities within a township, often defined by ZIP code boundaries, property deeds, and local consensus, but which have no official boundaries or population, unless they are also census-designated places (CDPs), geographical areas designated by the US Census Bureau for the purposes of compiling demographic data. Regardless of whether or not they are CDPs, however, they are not actual jurisdictions under Pennsylvania law. Private communities are gated settlements usually governed by a community association, which also often defines the boundaries of the community and may keep track of the number of its members. However, like villages, private communities have no official boundaries or populations, unless they are CDPs, and are never Pennsylvanian jurisdictions. The following is an incomplete list by necessity, but more complete lists of Wayne County's villages and private communities may be found in the corresponding township entry.

- Big Bass Lake (mostly in Lackawanna County)
- Gouldsboro (partially in Monroe County)
- Pocono Springs
- The Hideout
- Wallenpaupack Lake Estates
- White Mills

=== Unincorporated communities ===
- Damascus
- Equinunk
- Galilee
- Hamlin
- Hollisterville
- Jericho
- Lake Ariel
- Lake Como
- Lakeville
- Lakewood
- Milanville
- Newfoundland
- Orson
- Pleasant Mount
- Poyntelle
- Rileyville
- South Sterling
- Starlight
- Tanners Falls

=== Population ranking ===
The population ranking of the following table is based on the 2010 census of Wayne County.

† county seat

Rank	City/Town/etc.	Municipal type	Population (2010 Census)
1	† Honesdale	Borough	4,480
2	The Hideout	CDP	3,013
3	Waymart	Borough	1,341
4	Wallenpaupack Lake Estates	CDP	1,279
5	Big Bass Lake (mostly in Lackawanna County)	CDP	1,270
6	Hawley	Borough	1,211
7	Pocono Springs	CDP	926
8	Gouldsboro (partially in Monroe County)	CDP	890
9	White Mills	CDP	659
10	Prompton	Borough	250
11	Bethany	Borough	246
12	Starrucca	Borough	173

== See also ==
- National Register of Historic Places listings in Wayne County, Pennsylvania
