= Sterling Township, Pennsylvania =

Township in Pennsylvania, US

Sterling Township
- Township
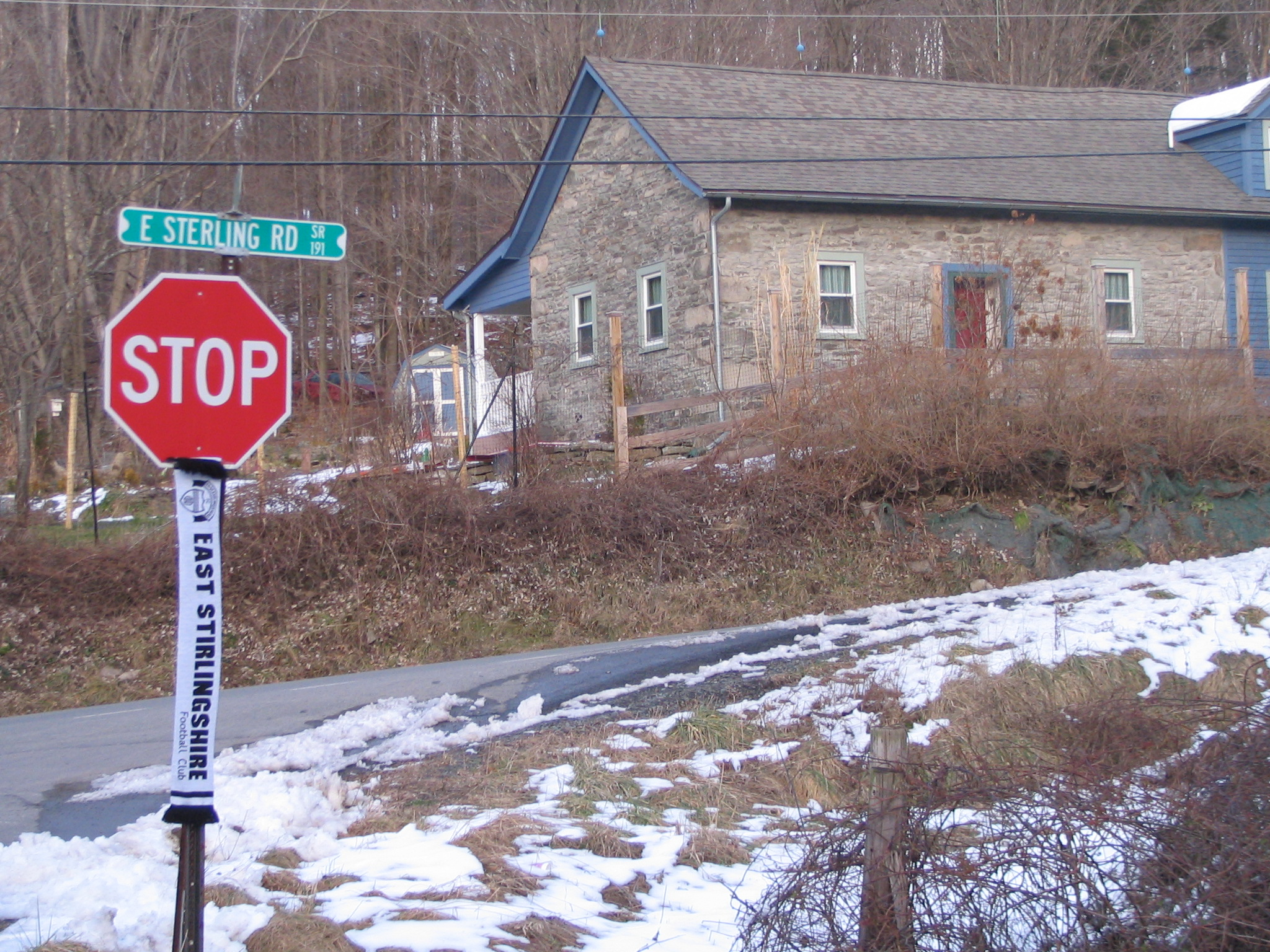
- East Sterling Road (PA 191)

- Location in Wayne County and the state of Pennsylvania.

- Location of Pennsylvania in the United States
- Coordinates: 41°20′00″N 75°24′59″W
- Country: United States
- State: Pennsylvania
- County: Wayne

Area
  - Total: 27.23 sq mi (70.52 km^{2})
  - Land: 27.00 sq mi (69.92 km^{2})
  - Water: 0.23 sq mi (0.60 km^{2})
- Elevation: 1,601 ft (488 m)

Population (2010)
  - Total: 1,450
  - Estimate (2016): 1,397
  - Density: 51.7/sq mi (19.98/km^{2})
- Time zone: UTC-5 (EST)
  - Summer (DST): UTC-4 (EDT)
- Postal codes: 18436, 18444, 18445, 18463
- Area codes: 570 and 272
- FIPS code: 42-127-73968
- Website: https://sterlingtwp.org/

Sterling is a second-class township in Wayne County, Pennsylvania. The township's population was 1,450 at the time of the 2010 United States Census.

== Communities ==
The following villages are located in Sterling Township:

- Callapoose
- Jericho
- Pocono Springs (part)
- Sterling (also called Nobleville)

== Geography ==
According to the United States Census Bureau, the township has a total area of 27.3 square miles (71 km^{2}), of which 27.2 square miles (70 km^{2}) is land and 0.1 square miles (0.26 km^{2}) (0.44%) is water.

== Demographics ==
Historical population
Census	Pop.	Note	%±
2010	1,450		—
2016 (est.)	1,397		−3.7%
U.S. Decennial Census

As of the census of 2010, there were 1,450 people, 570 households, and 431 families residing in the township. The population density was 46.0 inhabitants per square mile (17.8/km^{2}). There were 734 housing units at an average density of 23.5/sq mi (9.1/km^{2}). The racial makeup of the township was 95.9% White, 2.2% African American, 0.30% Asian, 0.6% from other races, and 0.8% from two or more races. Hispanic or Latino of any race were 2.7% of the population.

There were 570 households, out of which 26.1% had children under the age of 18 living with them, 62.5% were married couples living together, 7% had a female householder with no husband present, and 24.4% were non-families. 19.6% of all households were made up of individuals, and 5.9% had someone living alone who was 65 years of age or older. The average household size was 2.54 and the average family size was 2.89.

In the township the population was spread out, with 19.7% under the age of 18, 62.6% from 18 to 64, and 17.7% who were 65 years of age or older. The median age was 45 years.

As of 2010 census, the median income for a household in the township was $50,489, and the median income for a family was $53,333. Males had a median income of $32,297 versus $33,906 for females. The per capita income for the township was $25,700. About 8.7% of families and 11.6% of the population were below the poverty line, including 18.1% of those under age 18 and 4.1% of those age 65 or over.
