= Western Wayne School District =

School district in Pennsylvania

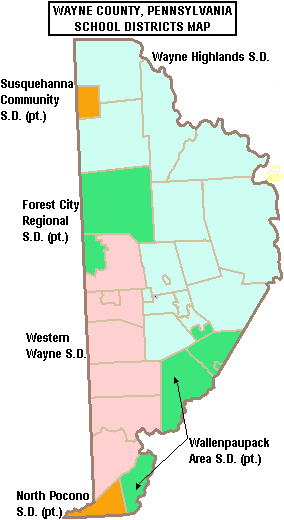

Address
- 1970c Easton Turnpike Lake Ariel, Pennsylvania, 18436-0158; United States

District information
- Type: Public

Other information
- Website: https://ww3.westernwayne.org/

Western Wayne School District is a third-class school district in Wayne County, Pennsylvania. The district's population was 19,292 at the time of the 2010 United States Census.

Western Wayne was formed in 1969. It serves the townships of Canaan, Lake, Salem, South Canaan, Sterling, and a portion of Clinton. The borough of Waymart is also part of the Western Wayne School District. The District encompasses 174 square miles (450 km^{2}). The school district is 25 miles north and east of the city of Scranton in the Northeastern region of Pennsylvania. In 2009, the District residents’ per capita income was $16,259, while the median family income was $39,971. In the Commonwealth of Pennsylvania, the median family income was $49,501 and the United States median family income was $49,445, in 2010.

Western Wayne School District operates four schools:

- R.D. Wilson Elementary (located in Waymart)
- EverGreen Elementary (located in Lake Ariel, Pennsylvania)
- Western Wayne Middle School (located in South Caanan Twp (Varden))
- Western Wayne High School (also in South Caanan (Varden))

== Regions and constituent municipalities ==
The district is divided into three regions, which include the following municipalities:

=== Region I ===
- Canaan Township
- Clinton Township (partially in the Forest City Regional School District)
- Waymart Borough

=== Region II ===
- Lake Township
- South Canaan Township

=== Region III ===
- Salem Township
- Sterling Township

== Extracurriculars ==
The Western Wayne School District offers a wide variety of clubs, activities and an extensive sports program.

=== Sports ===
The District funds:

Boys

- Baseball - AAA
- Basketball- AAA
- Cross Country - AA
- Football - AAA
- Golf - AAA
- Soccer - AA
- Tennis - AA
- Track and Field - AAA
- Volleyball - AA
- Wrestling - AA

Girls

- Basketball - AAA
- Cross Country - AA
- Soccer (Fall) - AA
- Softball - AAA
- Girls' Tennis - AA
- Track and Field - AAA
- Volleyball - AA

Middle School Sports

Boys

- Baseball
- Basketball
- Cross Country
- Football
- Soccer
- Track and Field
- Wrestling

Girls

- Basketball
- Cross Country
- Softball
- Track and Field

According to PIAA directory June 2013
