= Clifton Township, Lackawanna County, Pennsylvania =

Township in Pennsylvania, US

Clifton Township
- Township
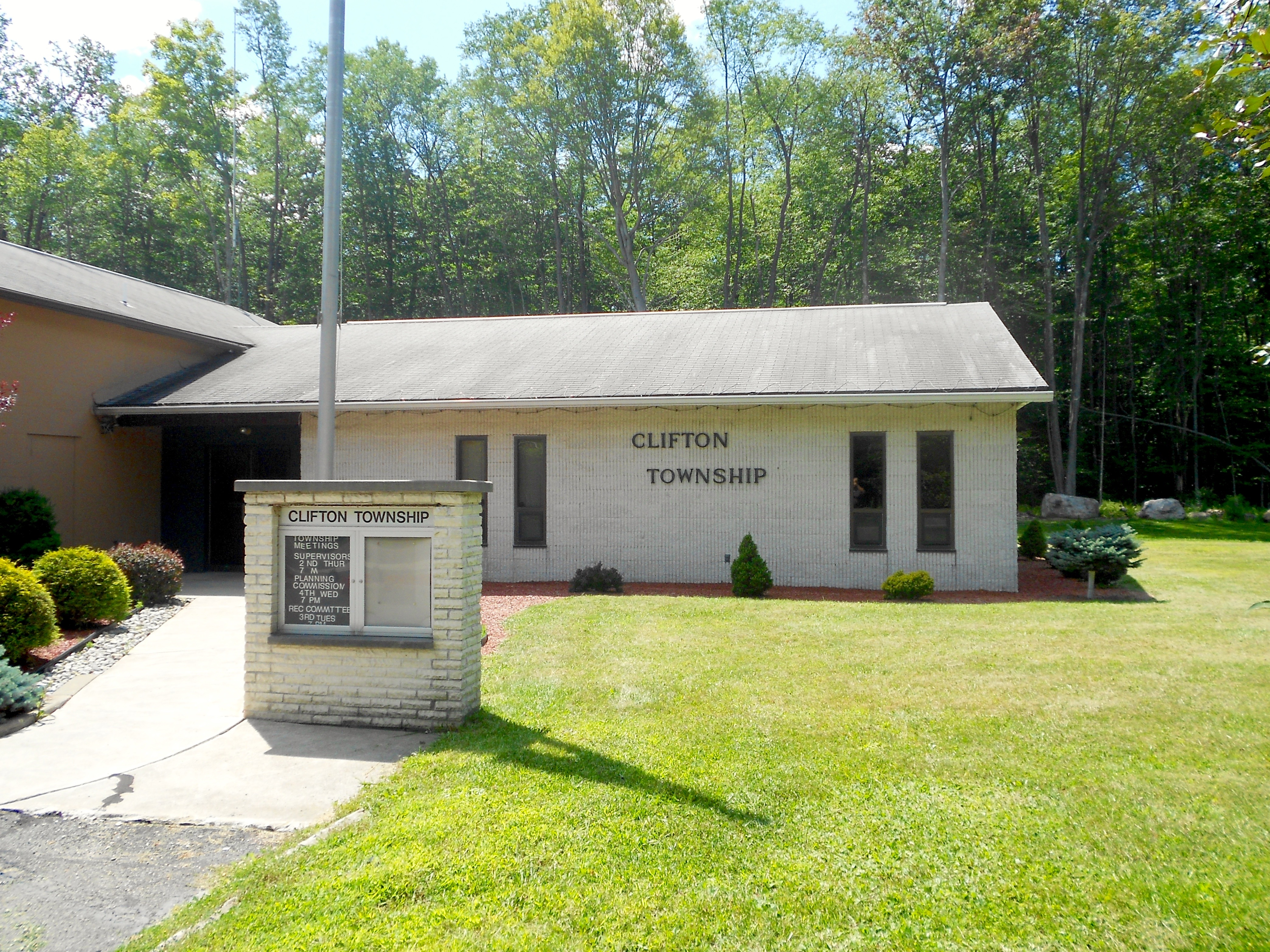
- Municipal building

- Location of Pennsylvania in the United States
- Coordinates: 41°14′00″N 75°32′59″W
- Country: United States
- State: Pennsylvania
- County: Lackawanna

Area
  - Total: 19.82 sq mi (51.33 km^{2})
  - Land: 19.44 sq mi (50.34 km^{2})
  - Water: 0.38 sq mi (0.99 km^{2})
- Elevation: 1,765 ft (538 m)

Population (2020)
  - Total: 1,494 ▲
  - Estimate (2021): 1,492
  - Density: 74.3/sq mi (28.67/km^{2})
- Time zone: UTC-5 (EST)
  - Summer (DST): UTC-4 (EDT)
- Postal code: 18424
- Area code: 570
- FIPS code: 42-069-14256
- Website: cliftontownship.com

Clifton Township is a township in Lackawanna County, Pennsylvania, United States. The population was 1,494 at the 2020 census.

== Geography ==
According to the United States Census Bureau, the township has a total area of 19.8 square miles (51 km^{2}), of which 19.3 square miles (50 km^{2}) is land and 0.4 square miles (1.0 km^{2}) (2.28%) is water. The community of Big Bass Lake occupies the eastern part of the township and contains the majority of the township population.

== Demographics ==
Historical population
Census	Pop.	Note	%±
2010	1,480		—
2020	1,494		0.9%
2021 (est.)	1,492		−0.1%
U.S. Decennial Census

As of the census of 2010, there were 1,480 people, 627 households, and 437 families residing in the township. The population density was 76.7 people per square mile. There were 1,264 housing units at an average density of 65.5/sq mi. The racial makeup of the township was 95.3% White, 1.5% African American, 0.7% Asian, 1.4% from other races, and 1.1% from two or more races. Hispanic or Latino of any race were 4.7% of the population.

There were 627 households, out of which 22.2% had children under the age of 18 living with them, 56.6% were married couples living together, 8.8% had a female householder with no husband present, and 30.3% were non-families. 24.4% of all households were made up of individuals, and 10.4% had someone living alone who was 65 years of age or older. The average household size was 2.36 and the average family size was 2.81.

In the township the population was spread out, with 19.7% under the age of 18, 57.5% from 18 to 64, and 22.8% who were 65 years of age or older. The median age was 49.5 years.

The median income for a household in the township was $61,625, and the median income for a family was $64,315. Males had a median income of $42,865 versus $32,647 for females. The per capita income for the township was $30,509. About 4.4% of families and 4.5% of the population were below the poverty line, including 13.0% of those under age 18 and 1.8% of those age 65 or over.
