= Covington Township, Lackawanna County, Pennsylvania =

Township in Pennsylvania, US

Covington Township
- Township
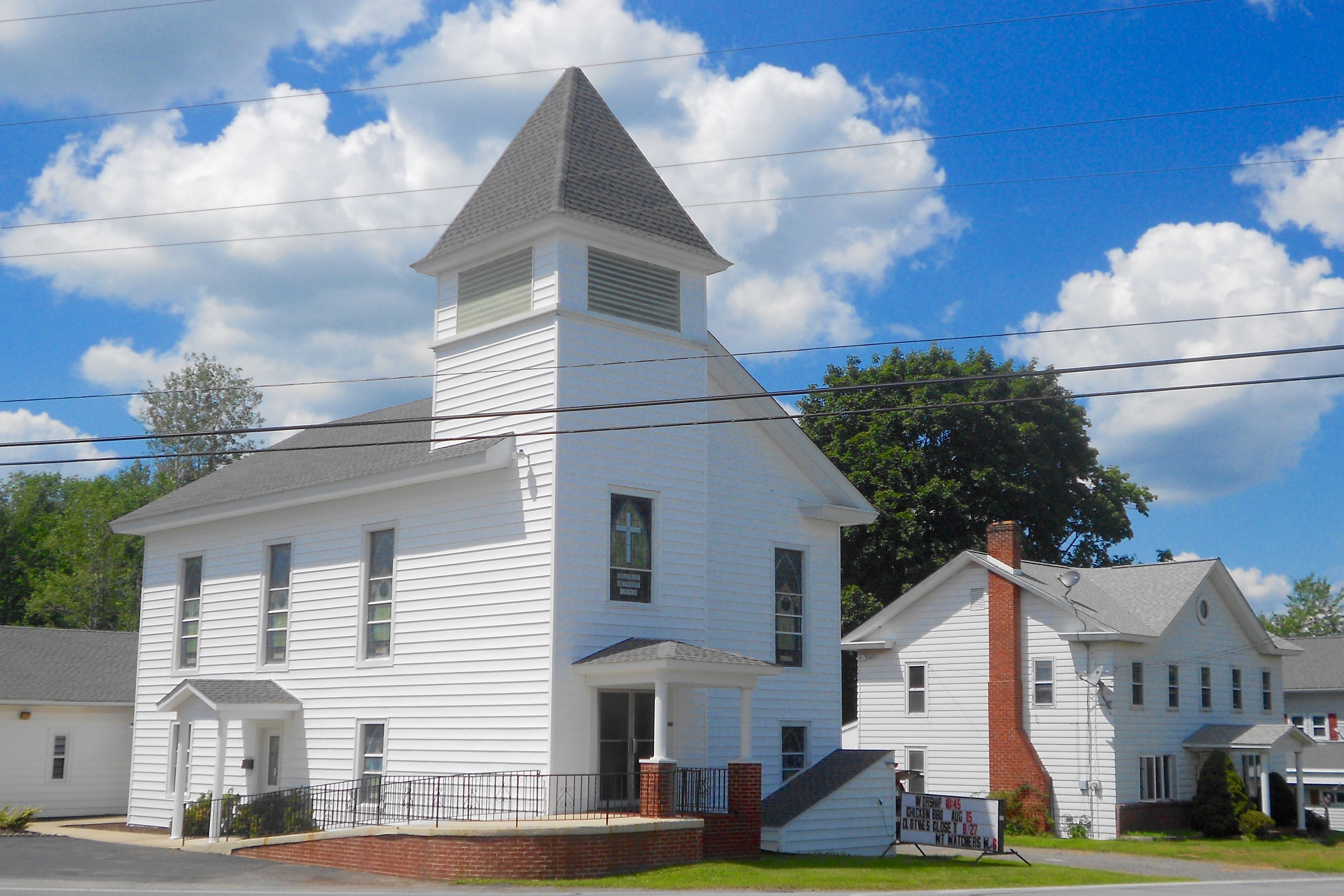
- Daleville United Methodist Church

- Location of Pennsylvania in the United States
- Coordinates: 41°18′00″N 75°28′59″W
- Country: United States
- State: Pennsylvania
- County: Lackawanna

Area
  - Total: 23.92 sq mi (61.96 km^{2})
  - Land: 23.70 sq mi (61.37 km^{2})
  - Water: 0.23 sq mi (0.59 km^{2})
- Elevation: 1,831 ft (558 m)

Population (2020)
  - Total: 2,206 ▼
  - Estimate (2021): 2,220
  - Density: 95.2/sq mi (36.76/km^{2})
- Time zone: UTC-5 (EST)
  - Summer (DST): UTC-4 (EDT)
- Postal codes: 18424, 18444
- Area code: 570
- FIPS code: 42-069-16664
- Website: covingtontwp.org

Covington Township is a township in Lackawanna County, Pennsylvania, United States. The population was 2,206 as of the 2020 Census.

Mayor: Gracie Short

== Geography ==
According to the United States Census Bureau, the township has a total area of 23.9 square miles (61.9 km^{2}), of which, 23.7 square miles (61 km^{2}) of it is land and 0.2 square miles (1 km^{2}) of it (0.84%) is water.

== Demographics ==
Historical population
Census	Pop.	Note	%±
2010	2,284		—
2020	2,206		−3.4%
2021 (est.)	2,220		0.6%
U.S. Decennial Census

As of the census of 2010, there were 2,284 people, 883 households, and 673 families residing in the township. The population density was 96.4 inhabitants per square mile (37.2/km^{2}). There were 1,074 housing units at an average density of 45.3 per square mile (17.5/km^{2}). The racial makeup of the township was 97% White, 0.8% African American, 0.1% Native American, 0.6% Asian, 0.20% from other races, and 1.3% from two or more races. Hispanic or Latino of any race were 3.5% of the population.

There were 883 households, out of which 26.2% had own children under the age of 18 living with them, 63% were married couples living together, 9.4% had a female householder with no husband present, and 23.8% were non-families. 19.1% of all households were made up of individuals, and 7.3% had someone living alone who was 65 years of age or older. The average household size was 2.59 and the average family size was 2.95.

In the township the population was spread out, with 19.7% under the age of 18, 65.9% from 18 to 64, and 14.4% who were 65 years of age or older. The median age was 48 years. The female to male ratio was 1:1 approximately in every age group.

The median income for a household in the township was $63,672, and the median income for a family was $67,019. Males had a median income of $50,729 versus $40,134 for females. The per capita income for the township was $30,538. About 4.6% of families and 8.1% of the population were below the poverty line, including 16.1% of those under age 18 and 4.1% of those age 65 or over.

== Communities within the township ==
Covington Township is home to the village of Daleville, as well as the historical villages of Freytown, Turnersville, and Yostville. The census-designated place (CDP) of Eagle Lake is entirely within Covington Township, and the CDP of Big Bass Lake is partially within the township.

Daleville is home to Covington Township's primary business district, and includes several restaurants, a shopping plaza with a supermarket, and a variety of other stores.

== School district ==
Covington Township is part of the North Pocono School District, and is home to the new North Pocono High School, which was constructed in 2009.

== Controversy ==
Covington Township has experienced a significant amount of controversy and accusations against the current Board of Supervisors, with the Chairman bearing the brunt of the majority of the accusations.

Among the allegations of misconduct against Supervisor Yerke are accusations of knowingly allowing the illegal discharge of raw sewage, illegally dumping hazardous waste on his property and other environmental law violations, and theft and misuse of Township equipment.
