= Poverty thresholds (United States Census Bureau) =

U.S. Census Bureau-set income statistics categorizing poverty

For statistical purposes (e.g., counting the poor population), the United States Census Bureau uses a set of annual income levels, the poverty thresholds, slightly different from the federal poverty guidelines. As with the poverty guidelines, they represent a federal government estimate of the point below which a household of a given size has pre-tax cash income insufficient to meet minimal food and other basic needs.

Poverty thresholds were originally developed in 1963–64, based largely on estimates of the minimal cost of food needs, to measure changes in the impoverished population. The thresholds form the basis for calculating the poverty guidelines and, like them, are adjusted annually for overall inflation. The same threshold is used throughout the United States and does not vary based on geographical location.

There are 48 possible poverty thresholds that a family can be assigned to, which vary based on the family size and the age of its members.

If a family's total income before taxes is below the poverty threshold, that family is in poverty, and all members of that family have the same poverty status. The same applies for a single individual. The poverty threshold is used by federal organizations, including the United States Census Bureau, but government aid programs do not have to use the threshold as a standard to determine eligibility.

== Current levels ==
U.S. federal poverty thresholds, 2019, U.S. Census Bureau
Family size	Weighted average	Range (depending on ages)
1	$13,011	$12,261 (age 65+) - $13,300 (under 65)
2	$16,521	$15,453-$17,622
3	$20,355	$19,998-$20,598
4	$26,172	$25,926-$26,801
5	$31,021	$30,044-$32,263
6	$35,129	$33,522-$36,576
7	$40,016	$36,757-$42,348
8	$44,461	$41,709-$47,069
9+	$52,875	$49,426-$56,895

== See also ==
- Poverty threshold
- Poverty in the United States, a slightly different threshold set by the U.S. Department of Health and Human Services and used to determine eligibility for government assistance
- United States Consumer Price Index
