= North Pocono School District =

School district in Pennsylvania

- District offices in Moscow

Location
- Lackawanna and Wayne Counties US-PA United States
- Coordinates: 41°20′15.5″N 75°31′52.9″W

District information
- Type: Public
- Motto: To educate and challenge all students to their maximum potential and prepare them for the demands of a global society.
- Grades: K through 12
- Schools: 3 Elementary; 1 Middle; 1 High
- NCES District ID: 4217310

Students and staff
- Athletic conference: PIAA; District 2
- District mascot: Trojans
- Colors: Red, white, and Black

Other information
- Website: North Pocono School District

North Pocono is a third-class school district in Lackawanna and Wayne Counties in Pennsylvania. The district's population was 20,806 at the time of the 2010 United States Census.

The region served by North Pocono is considered to be the northern tip of the Pocono Mountains region in Northeastern Pennsylvania. North Pocono School District encompasses approximately 198 square miles (510 km^{2}). According to federal census data, North Pocono School District's population has increased by 2,377 residents from 18,429 residents in 2000. In 2009, North Pocono School District residents’ per capita income was $19,688, while the median family income was $49,766. In the Commonwealth, the median family income was $49,501 and the United States median family income was $49,445, in 2010.

A new North Pocono High School was built in 2009, and it opened during the school year of 2009–2010. The old high school, located on Church Street, is now the North Pocono Middle School. It houses grades 6 through 8. The new High School, which is located on Bochicchio Boulevard in Covington Township, houses grades 9 through 12.

North Pocono School District operates 5 schools: Jefferson Elementary Center (K to 3); Moscow Elementary Center (K to 3); North Pocono Intermediate School (4 to 5), North Pocono Middle School (6 to 8), and North Pocono High School (9 to 12).

== Regions and constituent municipalities ==
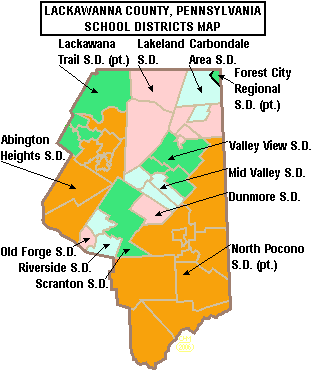
Map of school districts in Lackawanna County.

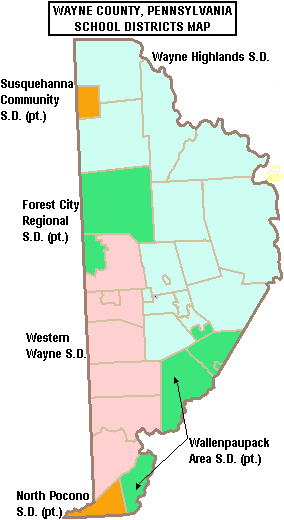
Map of school districts in Wayne County.

The district is divided into three regions, which include the following municipalities (labeled by county):

=== Region I ===
- Elmhurst Township (Lackawanna)
- Jefferson Township (Lackawanna)
- Roaring Brook Township (Lackawanna)

=== Region II ===
- Moscow Borough (Lackawanna)
- Thornhurst Township (Lackawanna)
- Spring Brook Township (Lackawanna)

=== Region III ===
- Lehigh Township (Wayne)
- Clifton Township (Lackawanna)
- Covington Township (Lackawanna)
- Madison Township (Lackawanna)

== Extracurriculars ==
North Pocono School District offers a variety of clubs, activities, an expansive music program, and an extensive sports program.

=== Sports ===
The District funds:

Boys

- Baseball – AAA
- Basketball- AAA
- Cross Country – AAA
- Football – AAA
- Golf – AAA
- Lacrosse – AAAA
- Rifle – AAAA
- Wrestling – AAA
- Soccer – AAA
- Tennis – AAA
- Track and Field – AAA
- Volleyball – AA

Girls

- Basketball – AAA
- Cheer – AAAA
- Cross Country – AA
- Golf – AAA
- Rifle – AAAA
- Soccer (Fall) – AA
- Softball – AAA
- Girls' Tennis – AAA
- Track and Field – AAA
- Volleyball – AA
- Lacrosse – AAA

Middle School Sports

Boys

- Baseball
- Basketball
- Cross Country
- Football
- Soccer
- Track and Field
- Wrestling

Girls

- Basketball
- Cross Country
- Softball
- Soccer

Track and Field
