= Pennsylvania Route 115 =

35.7-mile-long (57.5 km) north–south state highway in eastern Pennsylvania

Pennsylvania Route 115
- Major roads in the Poconos with PA 115 in red

Route information
- Maintained by PennDOT
- Length: 35.652 mi (57.376 km)
- Existed: 1928–present

Major junctions
- South end: US 209 in Brodheadsville
- PA 903 in Tunkhannock Township; I-80 in Tobyhanna Township; PA 940 in Tobyhanna Township; I-476 Toll / Penna Turnpike NE Extension in Bear Creek Township
- North end: I-81 / PA 309 near Wilkes-Barre

Location
- Country: United States
- State: Pennsylvania
- Counties: Monroe, Luzerne

Highway system
- Pennsylvania State Route System; Interstate; US; State; Scenic; Legislative
← PA 114	→ PA 116
← US 15	PA 15	→ PA 16
← PA 438	PA 439	→ PA 441

Pennsylvania Route 115 (PA 115) is a 35.7-mile-long (57.5 km) north–south state highway in eastern Pennsylvania. It stretches from U.S. Route 209 (US 209) in Brodheadsville, Monroe County, northwest to Interstate 81 (I-81) and PA 309 near Wilkes-Barre in Luzerne County. PA 115 passes through rural areas along its route, intersecting PA 903 in Tunkhannock Township, I-80 and PA 940 in Tobyhanna Township, and I-476 (Pennsylvania Turnpike Northeast Extension) in Bear Creek Township. The road serves as a connector between the Pocono Mountains and the Wyoming Valley.

The road originated as the Sullivan Trail, a route that follows the path taken by General John Sullivan during his expedition in the American Revolutionary War. The Sullivan Trail later became known as the Easton and Wilkes-Barre Turnpike, a turnpike that connected Easton and Wilkes-Barre between 1815 and the 1850s. PA 115 was designated in 1928 to run from Montoursville east to Swiftwater; the route was designated PA 15 for a year prior to that. In 1935, the east end was realigned from Swiftwater to Saylorsburg. By 1937, the termini were moved from Montoursville to Mausdale and from Saylorsburg to Easton. PA 115 was extended west to Milton by 1950. The northern terminus was realigned to Hughesville by 1960, the same time a portion of the route from Saylorsburg to Wind Gap was relocated to a freeway alignment. PA 115's northern terminus was cut back to the Wilkes-Barre area in 1961. The southern terminus was rolled back to Brodheadsville by 1972. PA 115 has had its northern terminus in various locations in the Wilkes-Barre area from 1962 to 1990; finally being moved to its current location in 1991.

== Route description ==
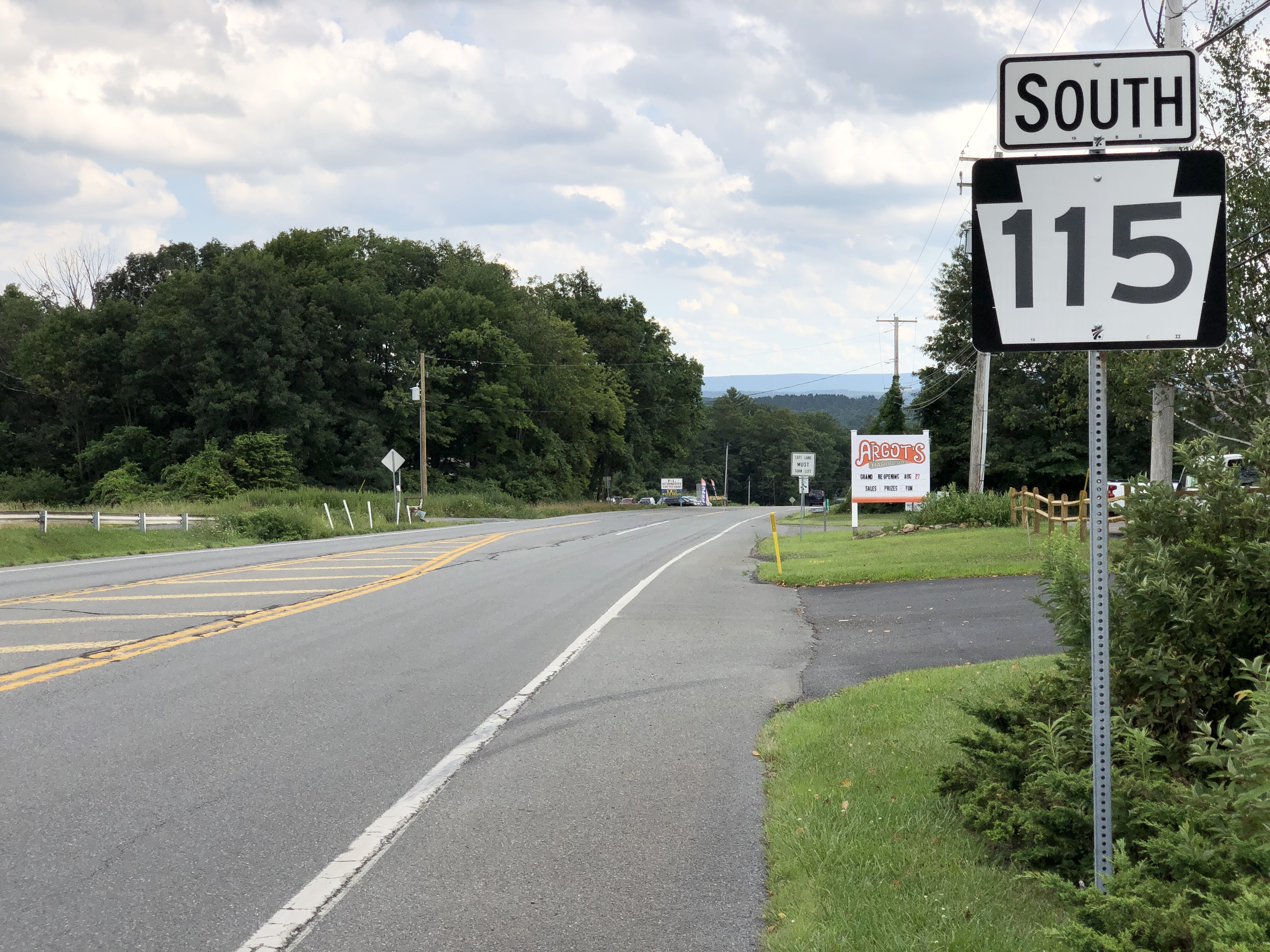
PA 115 southbound in Chestnuthill Township

PA 115 begins at a roundabout with US 209 in the community of Brodheadsville in Chestnuthill Township, Monroe County, which is in the Pocono Mountains region. From this intersection, the route heads northwest as a two-lane undivided road, running through business areas and passing north of Pleasant Valley High School before continuing into a mix of farmland and woodland with some development. The road passes through the community of Effort and curves to the north. PA 115 briefly gains a center left-turn lane before it becomes a three-lane road with a second northbound lane and continues into forested areas with residential neighborhoods, turning to the northwest and entering Tunkhannock Township. The route narrows back to two lanes and runs through more dense forests. The road passes to the southwest of Pocono Raceway and gains a center left-turn lane before it curves more to the west and meets the northern terminus of PA 903. Past this intersection, the route narrows to two lanes and crosses Tunkhannock Creek. PA 115 heads northwest again through more forested areas with some development before crossing into Tobyhanna Township. Here, the route immediately reaches a partial cloverleaf interchange with I-80 at exit 284, at which point it widens into a four-lane divided highway. After the interchange, PA 115 narrows back into a two-lane undivided road and crosses Tobyhanna Creek. The route intersects PA 940 in the community of Blakeslee, at which point it passes a few businesses. Following this intersection, the road heads back through forests.

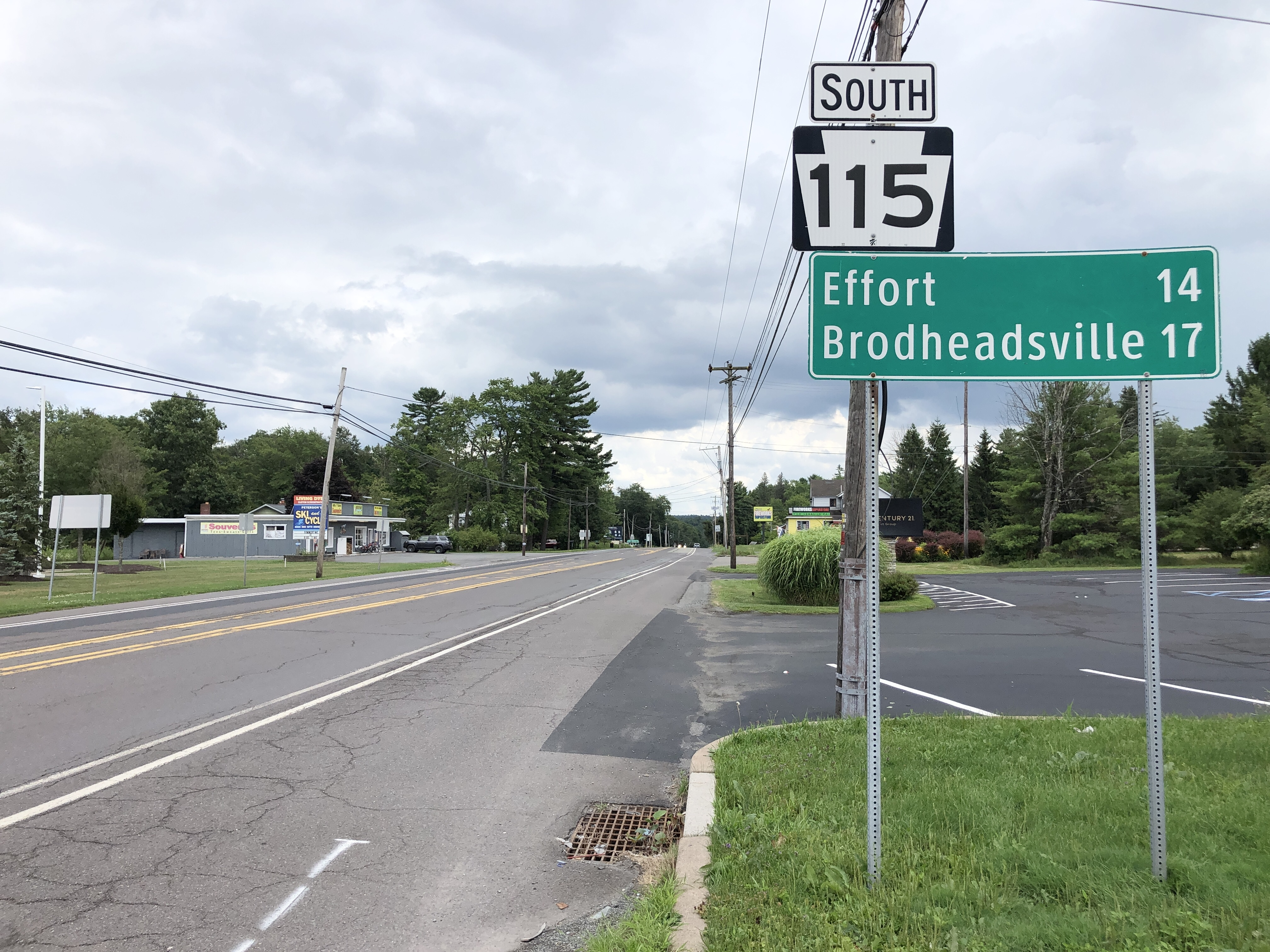
PA 115 southbound past PA 940 in Blakeslee

PA 115 crosses the Lehigh River into Buck Township in Luzerne County, where the name of the road becomes Buck Boulevard. The route passes through more dense forest, curving more to the west and entering Bear Creek Township in the community of Shades Glen. The road becomes Bear Creek Boulevard and continues west, entering the borough of Bear Creek Village. Here, PA 115 gains a center left-turn lane and heads through wooded areas of homes, passing to the south of Bear Creek Lake. The route heads northwest and becomes the border between Bear Creek Village to the northeast and Bear Creek Township to the southwest, with the turn lane disappearing and the road gaining a second southbound lane. The route fully enters Bear Creek Township again, where it turns back into a three-lane road with a center left-turn lane and passes near some residential neighborhoods, turning to the north.

PA 115 curves northwest and comes to a ramp that provides access to I-476 (Pennsylvania Turnpike Northeast Extension) at exit 105 (Wilkes-Barre interchange). The route becomes a wide two-lane road and runs parallel to I-476 to the west as it descends Wyoming Mountain. The road curves northeast, coming to a northbound pullover for overweight trucks, before a turn to the northwest, where it passes under I-476. PA 115 continues north through forests with some homes, coming to a northbound runaway truck ramp and passing through Llewellyns Corners. The route enters Plains Township and passes over the Reading Blue Mountain and Northern Railroad's Lehigh Division line as it comes to another northbound runaway truck ramp and winds through more dense forests as a four-lane divided highway. PA 115 turns to the west and passes south of commercial development before it comes to its northern terminus at a partial cloverleaf interchange with I-81 and PA 309 at exit 170 outside of the city of Wilkes-Barre. Past this interchange, the roadway continues west as a freeway called the North Cross Valley Expressway, which is part of PA 309.

== History ==
=== Old roads ===
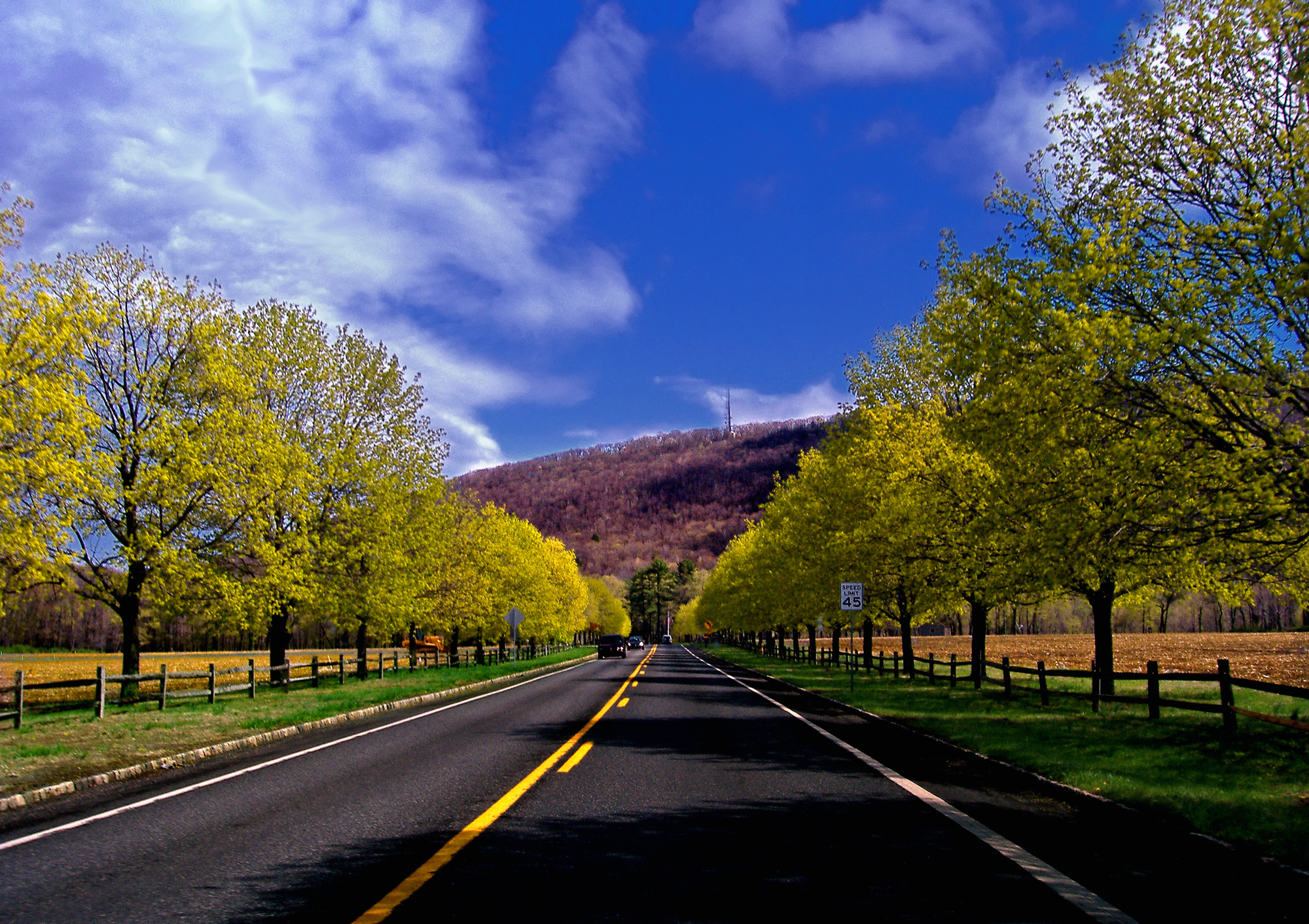
Former PA 115 near Wind Gap

The southern and northern portions of what became PA 115 from Easton to Wilkes-Barre was originally a pathway made by General John Sullivan and his forces in 1779 during the American Revolutionary War on their expedition from Easton to the Wyoming Valley. George Washington ordered Sullivan to march upstream the Susquehanna River to join General James Clinton's brigade at the Bradford County town of Tioga (now known as Athens). Soon after, Sullivan's army departed to Newtown, New York where they defeated the Iroquois and Cayuga Indians living in Western New York. His campaign was one of the most important military movements in the American Revolution. The southernmost segment of General Sullivan's path which became part of PA 115 centuries later from Knox Avenue in Easton to PA 512 in Wind Gap is currently designated as Sullivan Trail.

At the turn of the 19th century, the population and economy of Luzerne County continued to grow and there was a necessity for new roads to improve communication between distant settlements. Most of the early merchandise transportation in the area was done by Durham boats on the Lehigh and Susquehanna Rivers. This led Arnold Colt, a Luzerne County clerk, to construct a turnpike directly connecting the Wyoming and Lehigh Valleys on Sullivan's Trail. Colt then obtained a charter to incorporate the Easton and Wilkes-Barre Turnpike on February 11, 1803. The first 46 miles (74 km) of the turnpike from Wilkes-Barre to Wind Gap were finished by 1807. The road was completed by 1815 at a total expense of $75,000 (equivalent to $1.32 million in 2025).

They are building a plank road to Slocum Hollow [now Scranton] to get to a railroad and they say that a man can get from Wilkes-Barre to New York in a day. It is almost beyond my belief. I wonder what will become of the old turnpike there is no more use for the old man and the old road.

— Honorable Joseph Slocum, former president of the Easton and Wilkes-Barre Turnpike

The turnpike was initially used as major thoroughfare for conveying grains and plaster during War of 1812. When Northampton County farmers could not afford shipped plaster from the Eastern seaboard they became interested in New York plaster. The plaster was transported from New York via the Susquehanna River then onto the turnpike on wagons and sleds. Transporting this product became the turnpike's legacy as it transformed the road into an important commercial line.

By the 1850s, the transport industry heavily favored trains over wagons and sleds. In 1851, the Lackawanna and Western Railroad was completed, connecting Scranton to upstate New York. The new railroad shortened the time required to ship goods between the two endpoints from ten days (by way of roads) to just one. The amount of traffic on the turnpike declined as a result. By the 1850s, the turnpike company had folded and the highway was abandoned. From Bear Creek to Tobyhanna Township the name Easton and Wilkes-Barre Road is still marked on PA 115. The former southern extension of PA 115 from Brodheadsville to Wind Gap is marked as the Wilkes-Barre Turnpike.

=== Designation ===
Pennsylvania Route 15
- Location: Montoursville – Swiftwater
- Existed: 1927–1928

Pennsylvania Route 439
- Location: Jerseytown – Benton
- Existed: 1928–1937

When Pennsylvania began maintenance over roads by the way of the Sproul Road Bill in May 1911, the Luzerne County portion of present-day PA 115 was adopted as Legislative Route 169 (LR 169), the primary connector between Wilkes-Barre and the Pocono Mountains. The former southernmost segment of the route from Saylorsburg to Easton was adopted as LR 166. The first traffic routes were assigned in 1924 and by 1927, the state had assigned LR 169 as PA 15 only to be renumbered the following year as PA 115.

When PA 115 was commissioned in 1928, the road was mostly aligned east–west and stretched from US 220 in Montoursville east to US 611 in Swiftwater near Mount Pocono. Through the Wilkes-Barre area, PA 115 passed through Luzerne on Bennett Street before it ran through Kingston by following US 11 on Wyoming Avenue and Market Street. PA 115 crossed the Susquehanna River into Wilkes-Barre and passed through the city by following US 309 along River Street, Courtright Street, Main Street, Butler Street, Pearl Street, and Kidder Street. In April 1935, the southern terminus of PA 115 was moved from Mount Pocono to PA 12 in Saylorsburg, following the Effort Mountain road connecting Wilkes-Barre with Easton. The former alignment of PA 115 from Tobyhanna Township to Swiftwater was replaced by PA 940, which is now PA 940 between Tobyhanna Township and Pocono Summit and PA 314 between Pocono Summit and Swiftwater. By 1937, the southern terminus of PA 115 extended to US 611 in Easton. The new route followed the Sullivan Trail and replaced PA 102 between Easton and Stockertown. The same year, the northern terminus was moved from Montoursville to PA 54 in the Montour County community of Mausdale. The route replaced a part of PA 154 between Mausdale and Jerseytown, all of PA 439 between Jerseytown and Benton, and a part of PA 339 between Benton and Coles Creek. The former alignment of PA 115 between Montoursville and Coles Creek became PA 87 between Montoursville and Forksville and PA 154 between Forksville and Coles Creek. This alignment retains these designations today except that PA 154 has been removed between Laporte and Coles Creek. By 1940, PA 115 was realigned in Wilkes-Barre to follow Market Street, US 309 along Washington Street, Butler Street, and Kidder Street.

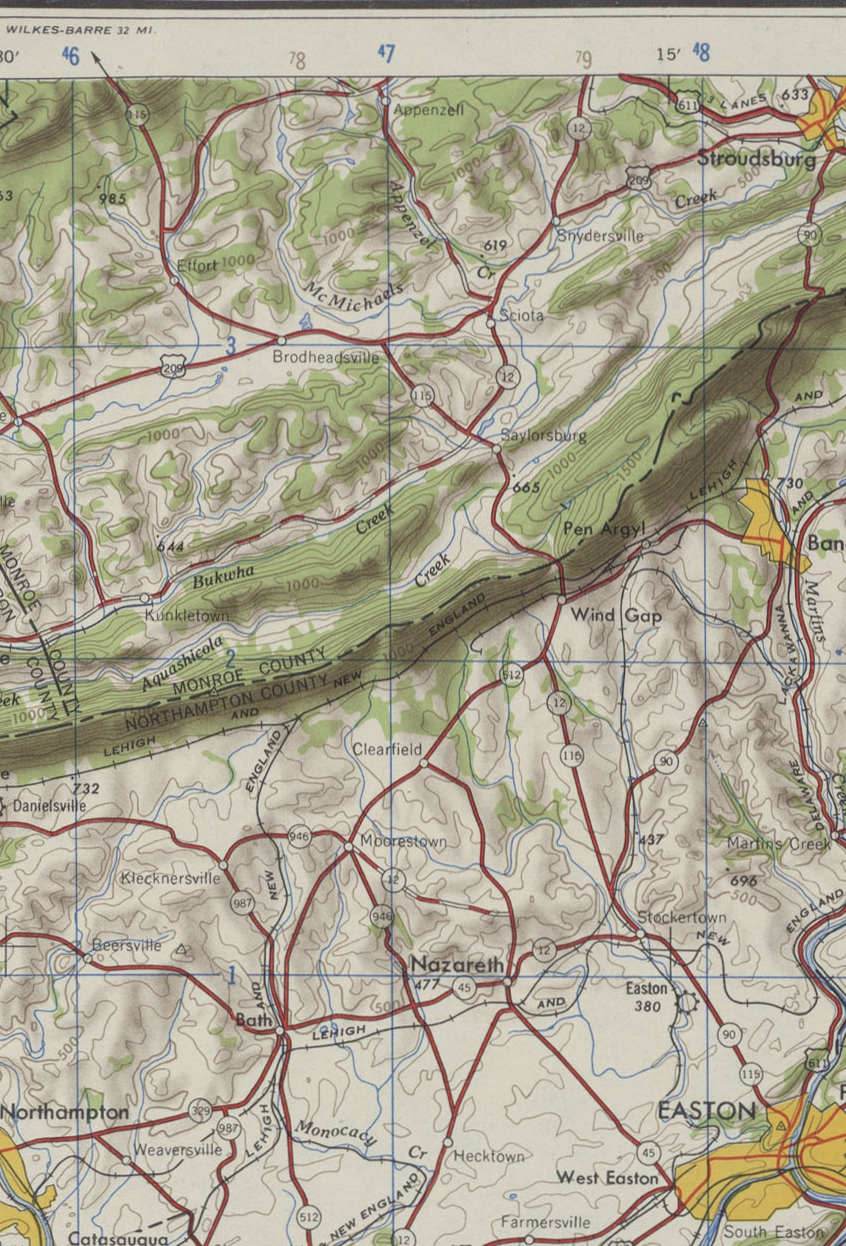
Former southernmost alignment of PA 115 in Monroe and Northampton counties

By 1950, PA 115 was extended west to PA 14 (currently PA 405) in Milton, replacing a portion of PA 154 between Milton and Mooresburg and a portion of PA 45 between Mooresburg and Mausdale. Also, a new alignment of PA 115 between Lehman and PA 415 in Dallas was proposed. By 1950, US 309 was designated concurrent with PA 115 through the Wilkes-Barre area, with the two routes following Union Street through Luzerne, US 11 along Wyoming Avenue and Pierce Street through Kingston, and River Street, Courtright Street, Main Street, Butler Street, and Kidder Street through Wilkes-Barre. The northern terminus was moved from Milton to US 220 in Hughesville during the 1950s; this stretch replaced a portion of PA 642. The former alignment of PA 115 between Milton and Red Rock became PA 642 between Milton and Jerseytown and PA 254 between Jerseytown and Red Rock. This alignment is now PA 642, PA 254 between Jerseytown and Benton, and PA 487 between Benton and Red Rock. In addition, the route was moved to its new alignment between Lehman and Dallas, where it turned southeast and picked up a concurrency with US 309. By 1960, PA 115 was moved onto a freeway (now PA 33) from Saylorsburg to PA 512 in Wind Gap.

In April 1961, the northern terminus of PA 115 was moved from Hughesville to US 309 (now PA 309 Business, PA 309 Bus.) in Wilkes-Barre Township, with the route replaced by PA 118 between Hughesville and Dallas. This change was made in order to eliminate the concurrency with US 309 between Dallas and Wilkes-Barre Township and to give the east-west portion between Hughesville and Dallas an even route number.

By 1972, the southern terminus was truncated from Easton to its current location. The portion of PA 115's former surface alignment in Northampton County between Center Square in Easton and PA 191 in Stockertown is now designated as State Route 2025, a north-south quadrant route. PA 115 was extended back to its former alignments by 1980 via Kidder Street, Butler Street, Main Street, Courtright Avenue, River Street, North Street, and Pierce Street through Wilkes-Barre and ended at US 11 in Kingston; this extension replaced a portion of PA 309 that was realigned through the Wilkes-Barre area. The route was truncated to PA 309 at the intersection of Kidder and Scott Streets in Wilkes-Barre by 1989, with PA 309 briefly replacing the designation along Kidder Street between Scott Street and Conyngham Avenue. In 1991, the northern terminus was moved to its current location when the North Cross Valley Expressway (PA 309) was completed, with PA 309 Bus. replacing the PA 115 designation along Kidder Street.

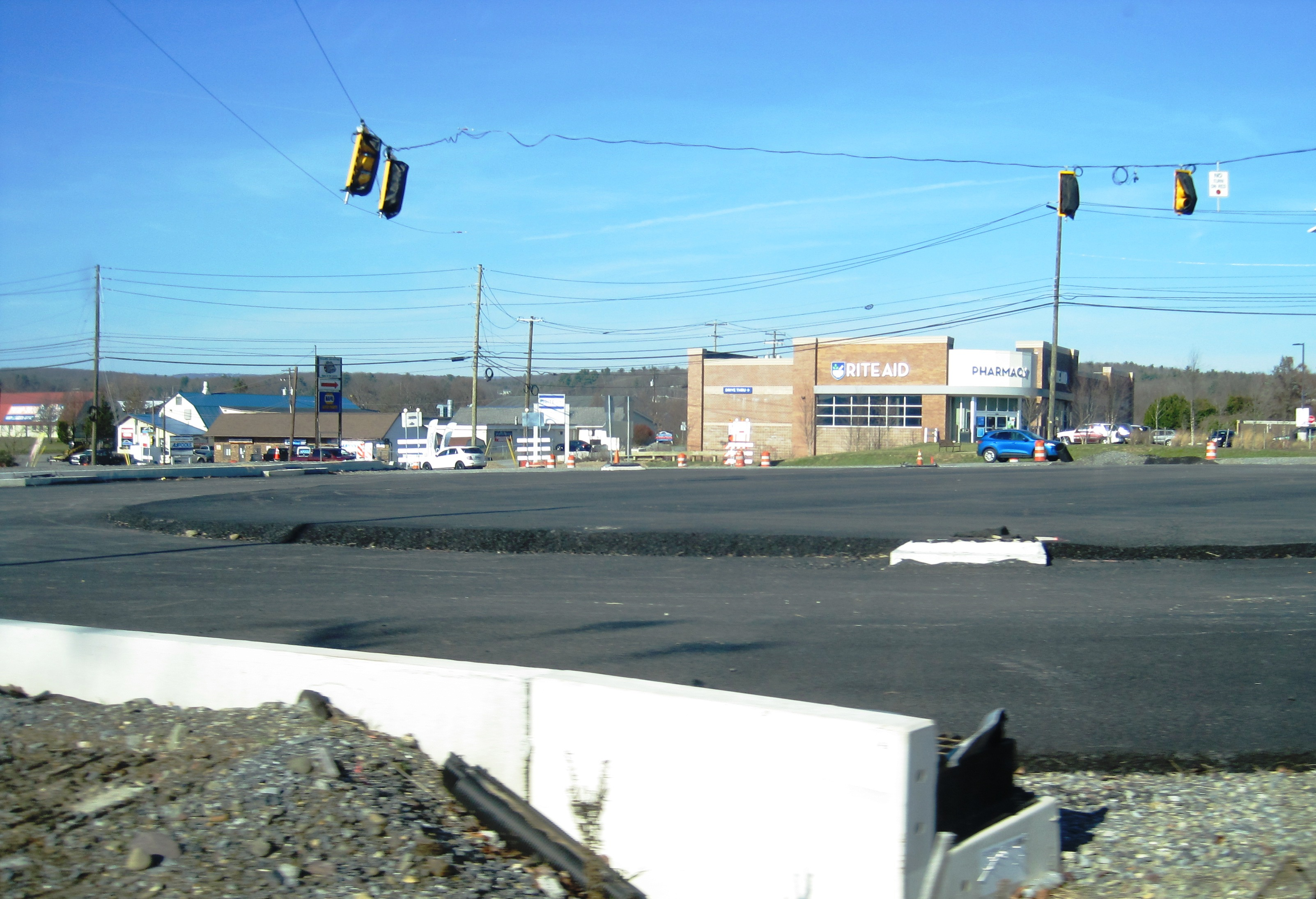
Construction of the roundabout at US 209 in November 2022

On March 10, 2014, Governor Tom Corbett announced plans for a $5 million project to widen PA 115 between PA 903 and Pocono Raceway in order to improve traffic flow to and from the raceway on race weekends. In 2018, widening began, with the road being widened from two lanes to three lanes with a center left-turn lane that can be configured as a reversible lane on race weekends.

There are plans to construct a roundabout at US 209 in Brodheadsville in order to alleviate traffic congestion. In February 2021, the Pennsylvania Department of Transportation opened construction bids for the proposed roundabout.

== Major intersections ==
County	Location	mi	km	Destinations	Notes
Monroe	Chestnuthill Township	0.000	0.000	US 209 to PA 715 – Stroudsburg, Easton, Lehighton	Southern terminus
Monroe	Tunkhannock Township	13.405	21.573	PA 903 south – Lake Harmony, Albrightsville, Jim Thorpe	Northern terminus of PA 903
Monroe	Tobyhanna Township	15.363	24.724	I-80 to I-476 Toll / Penna Turnpike NE Extension – Hazleton, Stroudsburg	Exit 284 on I-80
Monroe	Tobyhanna Township	16.774	26.995	PA 940 – White Haven, Mount Pocono	
Luzerne	Bear Creek Township	31.415	50.558	I-476 Toll / Penna Turnpike NE Extension	Exit 105 (Wilkes-Barre) on Penna Turnpike NE Extension; former PA 9
Luzerne	Plains Township			I-81 north – Hazleton, Scranton	Northbound exit and southbound entrance; exit 170A on I-81
Luzerne	Plains Township	35.652	57.376	PA 309 north – Wilkes-Barre	Northern terminus
1.000 mi = 1.609 km; 1.000 km = 0.621 mi: Electronic toll collection; Incomplete access

== Works cited ==
- Bradsby, Henry C. (1893). History of Luzerne County, Pennsylvania with Biographical Selections Vol. 1. S. B. Nelson.
