= Bear Creek Wind Power Project =

Wind farm in Pennsylvania, USA

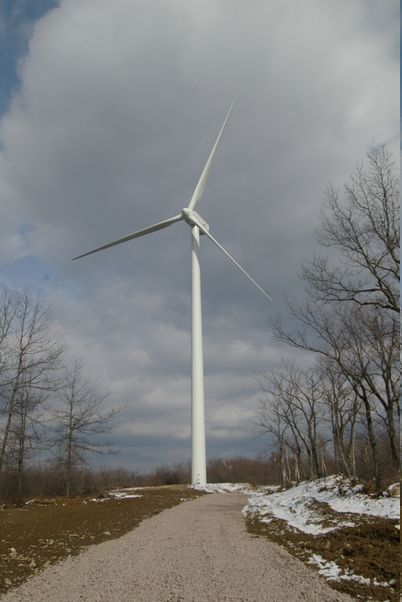
- Country: United States
- Location: Atlantic County Utilities A
- Coordinates: 41°14′17.235″N 75°44′44.487″W
- Status: Operational
- Commission date: March 2006
- Owners: Wind Park Jersey; Member LLC (entity of Infigen Energy - 59.3%); CH Community Wind Energy LLC (40.7%)

Wind farm
- Type: onshore

Power generation
- Units operational: 12 x 2 MW
- Make and model: Gamesa
- Nameplate capacity: 24 MW
- Annual net output: 61.4 GWh

The Bear Creek Wind Power Project is a wind farm located in Bear Creek Township near Wilkes-Barre in Luzerne County, Pennsylvania, USA, with twelve Gamesa 2.0 MW wind turbines that began commercial operation in March 2006. The wind farm has a combined total nameplate capacity of 24 MW, producing about 61.4 gigawatt-hours of electricity annually. Bear Creek usually operates at roughly a 30% capacity factor until the winter months when winds are stronger and it runs near 70 percent capacity.

The wind energy facility is located in the Poconos region of Northeastern Pennsylvania, less than 10 miles southeast of Wilkes-Barre near the village of Bear Creek. Construction of the wind farm was made possible by commitments from PPL Energy Plus to purchase the output of the project and leading wind energy customers such as the University of Pennsylvania and PEPCO Energy Services.

The wind farm is visible while heading south on the Pennsylvania Turnpike's Northeast Extension.

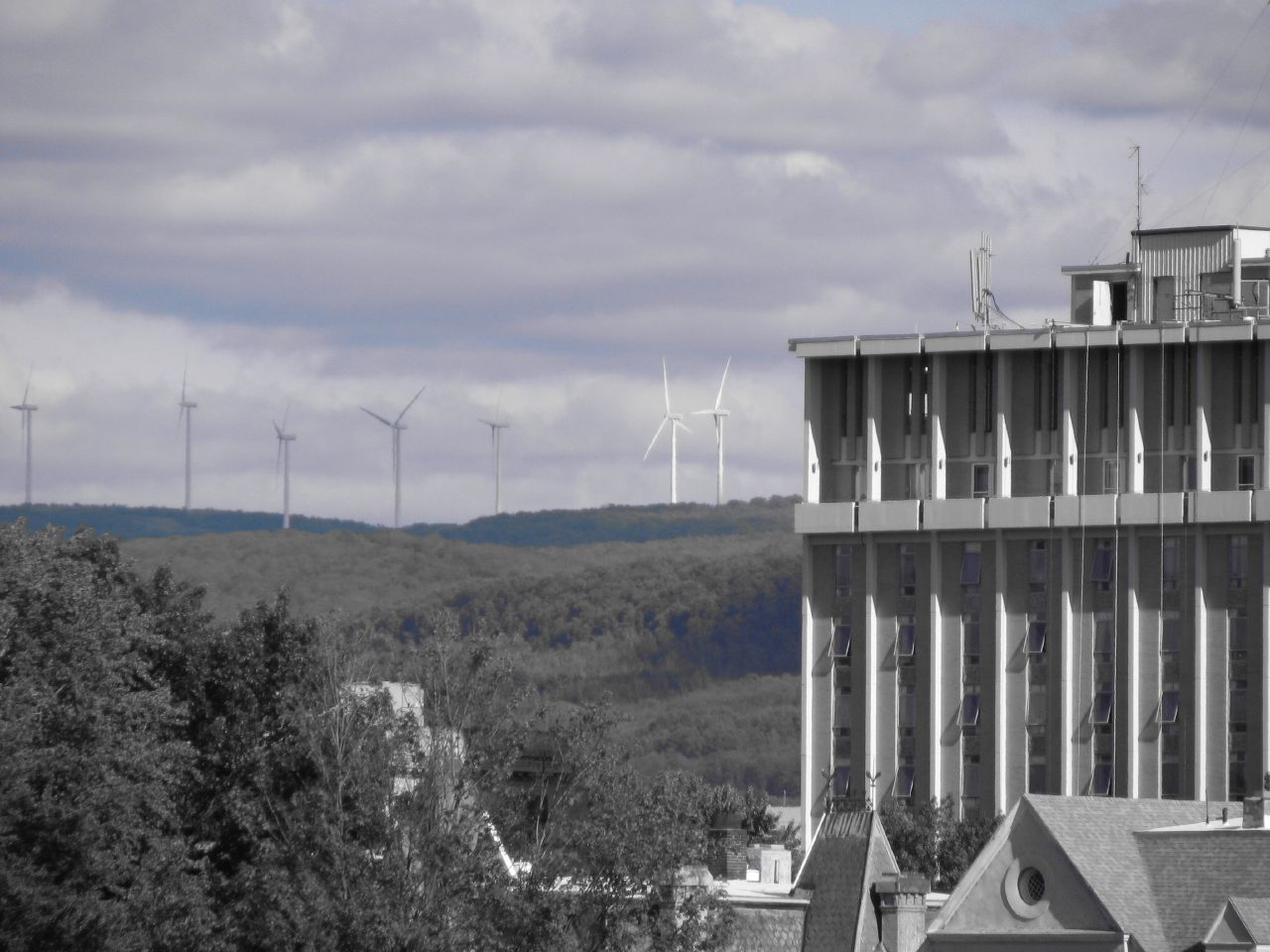
Wind farm as visible from the Turnpike

== See also ==
- Wind power in Pennsylvania
