= Pennsylvania Route 15 =

Pennsylvania Route 15 may refer to:

- Pennsylvania Route 15 (1920s)
- U.S. Route 15 in Pennsylvania
