= Bear Creek Township, Pennsylvania =

Township in Pennsylvania, US

Coordinates: 41°07′29″N 75°45′04″W

- Township
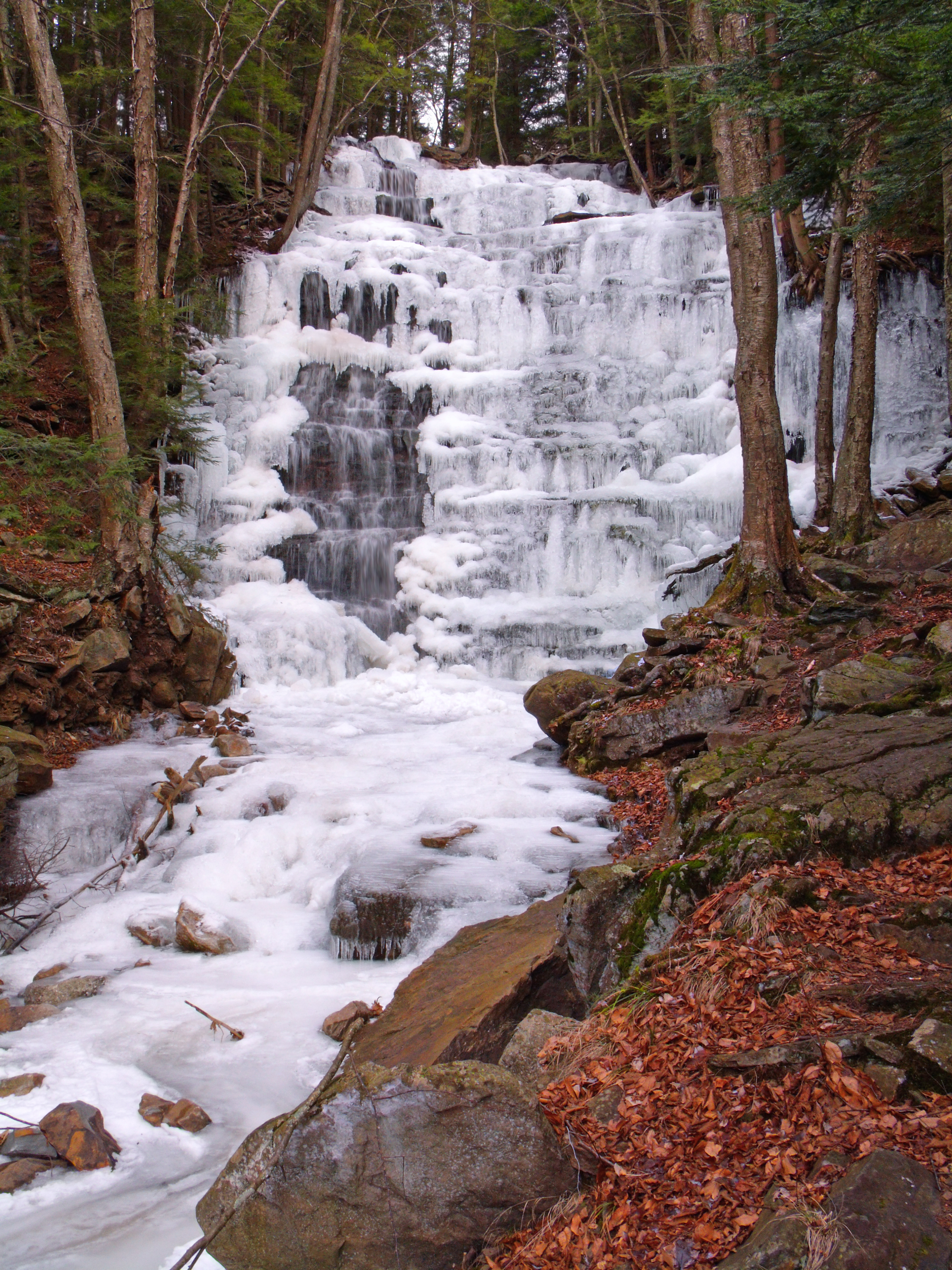
- Bear Creek Falls

- Seal

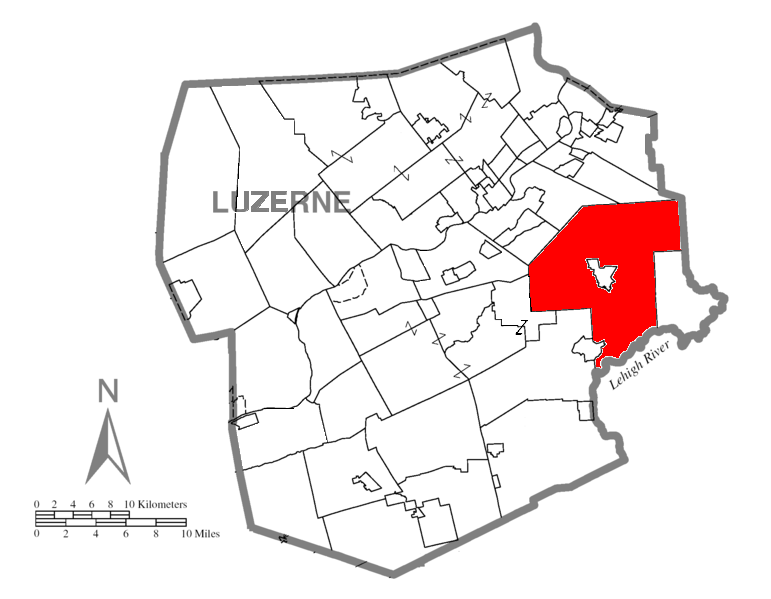
- Map of Luzerne County highlighting Bear Creek Township

- Map of Pennsylvania highlighting Luzerne County
- Country: United States
- State: Pennsylvania
- County: Luzerne

Government
  - Type: Board of supervisors

Area
  - Total: 67.95 sq mi (176.00 km^{2})
  - Land: 66.48 sq mi (172.17 km^{2})
  - Water: 1.48 sq mi (3.83 km^{2})

Population (2020)
  - Total: 2,752 ▼
  - Estimate (2021): 2,752
  - Density: 41.5/sq mi (16.04/km^{2})
- Time zone: UTC-5 (Eastern (EST))
  - Summer (DST): UTC-4 (EDT)
- Area codes: 570 & 272
- FIPS code: 42-079-04592
- Website: www.bearcreektownship.org

Bear Creek Township is a township in Luzerne County, Pennsylvania, United States. The township has a total area of 67.8 square miles (176 km^{2}), making it is the largest municipality (by total area) in Luzerne County. The population was 2,752 at the 2020 census.

== History ==
=== First settlers ===
Bear Creek was first settled in the late 18th century. The first log cabin was built in 1786 (about nine miles from Wilkes-Barre). Bear Creek, with its abundance of trees, became the lumber king of Luzerne County. The first sawmill was built in 1800 by Oliver Helme. Many more sawmills were later constructed throughout the 19th century.

=== Township ===
Bear Creek was later incorporated as a township; it was carved from territory taken from Wilkes-Barre, Pittston, Bucks, Plains, and Jenkins (in 1856). By 1890, the community had a population of 343.

In 1961, the Bear Creek Dam was constructed in the southern portion of the township. The dam spans the Lehigh River at its confluence with the tributary Bear Creek. Although the dam was originally constructed for flood management, its reservoir has since become a popular recreational area for fishing, kayaking, and boating. In 1963, the dam was renamed after a United States Congressman (Francis E. Walter).

In 1993, Bear Creek Village broke away from the township and became a borough. Today, the township is made up of several small villages, thick forests, lakes, and streams.

=== Air disaster ===
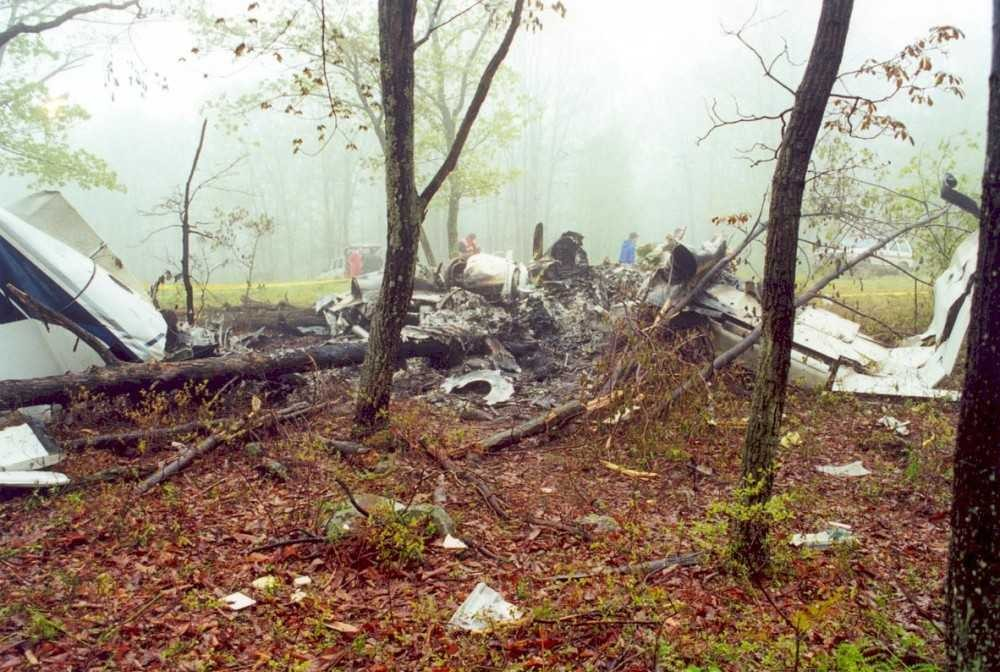
Site of the plane crash

Bear Creek Township was the site of a plane crash on May 21, 2000; it crashed while attempting to land at the Wilkes-Barre/Scranton International Airport. As described by the BBC, the crash occurred in a "wooded area" of the township, near the intersection of Bear Creek Boulevard (PA-Route 115) and the Northeast Extension of the Pennsylvania Turnpike.

The accident killed the pilot as well as all 19 passengers. NTSB investigation ruled that the crash was probably due to low fuel. The incident spurred an FBI investigation and made news across the globe. Passenger safety in the aviation field became a major issue of the 2000 U.S. presidential election.

=== 21st century ===
The Bear Creek Wind Power Project began commercial operation in 2006. The wind farm consists of twelve Gamesa 2.0 MW wind turbines.

== Government ==
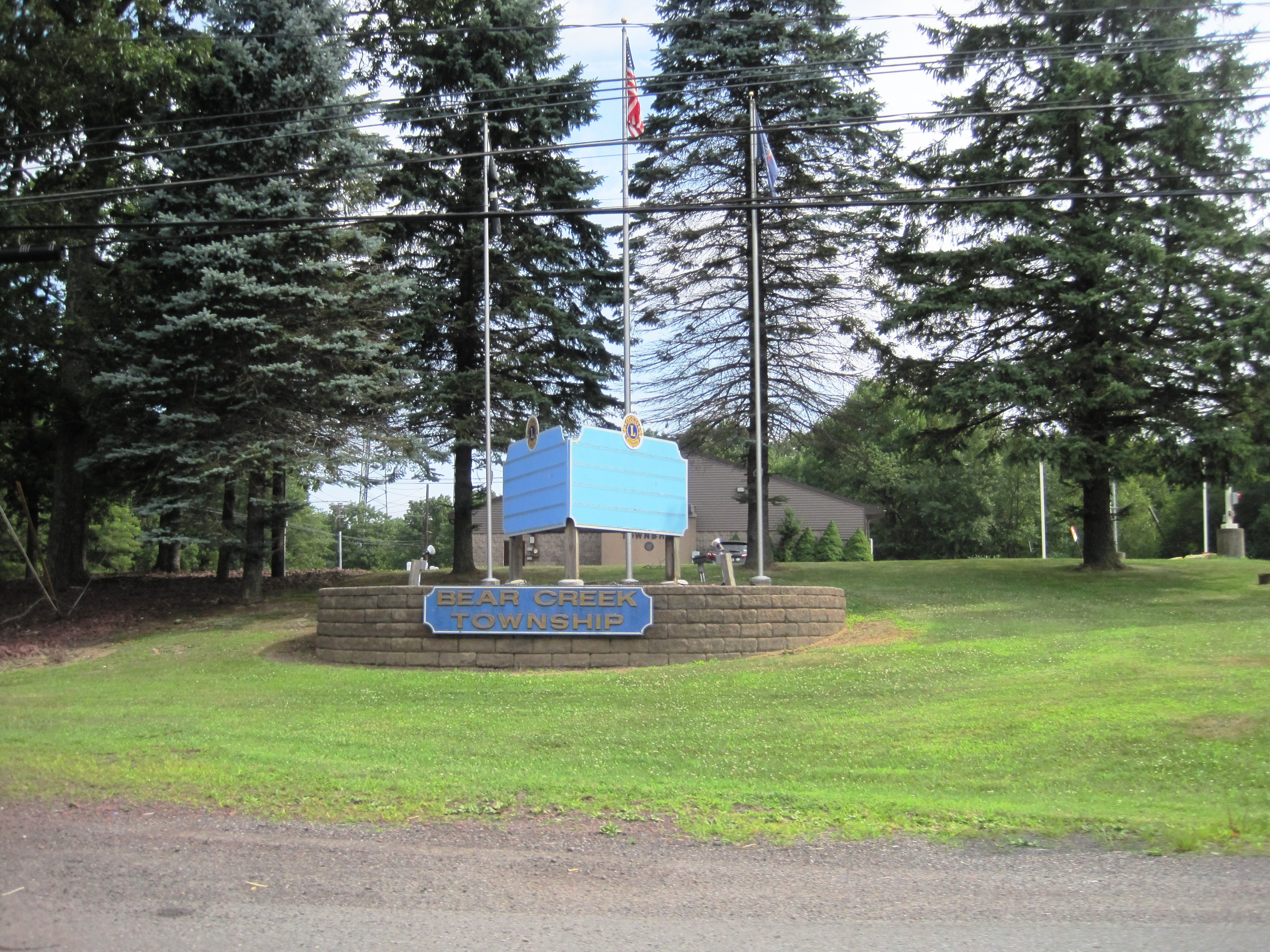
Bear Creek Township Building

List of Bear Creek Township Supervisors:

Position	Name
Chairperson	Gary Zingaretti
Vice Chairperson	Joseph Masi
Supervisor	James Smith
Supervisor	Ruth A. Koval
Supervisor	Jeffrey Popple

== Geography ==
According to the United States Census Bureau, the township has a total area of 67.8 square miles (176 km^{2}), of which 66.2 square miles (171 km^{2}) is land and 1.6 square miles (4.1 km^{2}), or 2.42%, is water. Bear Creek Township is the largest municipality (by total area) in Luzerne County. It is drained by both the Susquehanna and Lehigh rivers. The Francis E. Walter Dam and Reservoir is located in the southernmost section of the township (along the Lehigh River). The township's villages include Forest Park, Llewellyn Corners (also in Plains Township), and Pleasant View Summit.

Bear Creek's numbered routes are Interstate 476 (the Northeast Extension of the Pennsylvania Turnpike) and Route 115. These two routes are connected by the Wilkes-Barre turnpike interchange just north of Forest Park. 115 connects Wilkes-Barre with Monroe County. Other local roads of note include Laurel Run Road, Meadow Run Road, Thornhurst Road, and White Haven Road.

The township has a warm-summer humid continental climate (Dfb) and average monthly temperatures at the Turnpike interchange range from 23.1 °F in January to 69.1 °F in July. The hardiness zone is mostly 5b except at lower elevations in the NW where it is 6a.

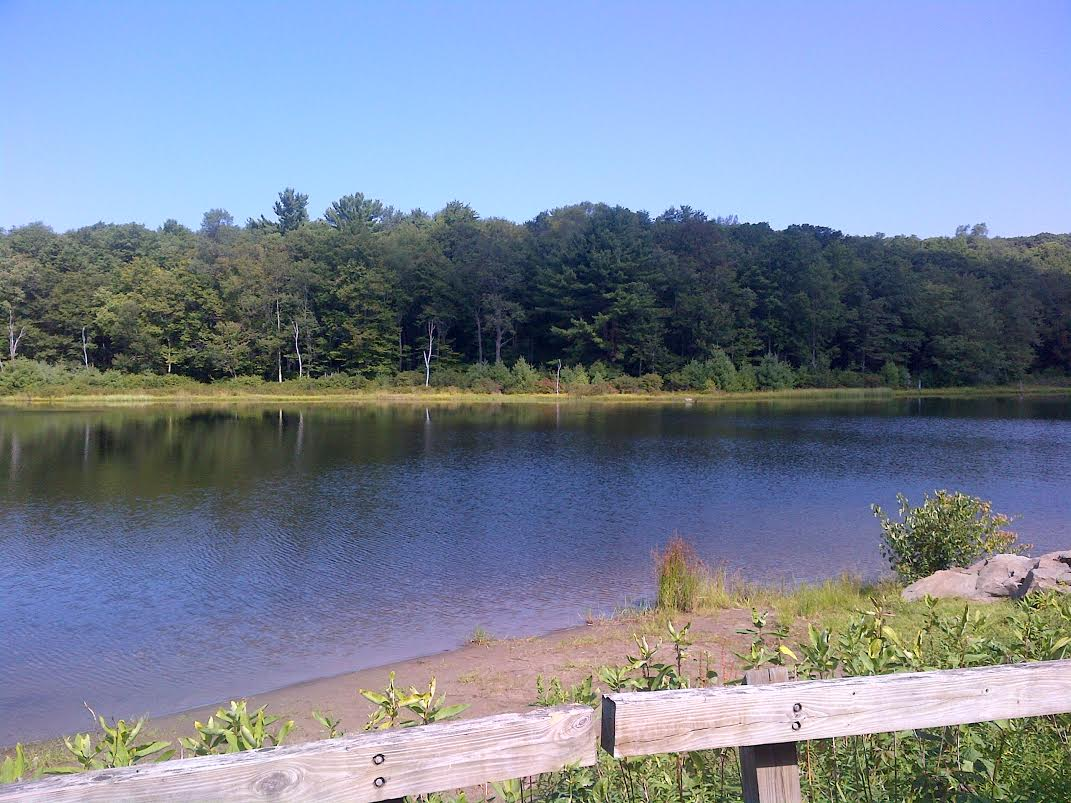
Lake at Bear Creek Camp Conservation Area

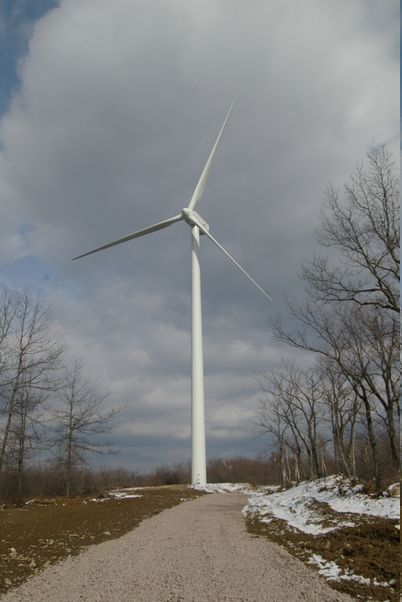
Wind turbine on Bald Mountain (in Bear Creek Township)

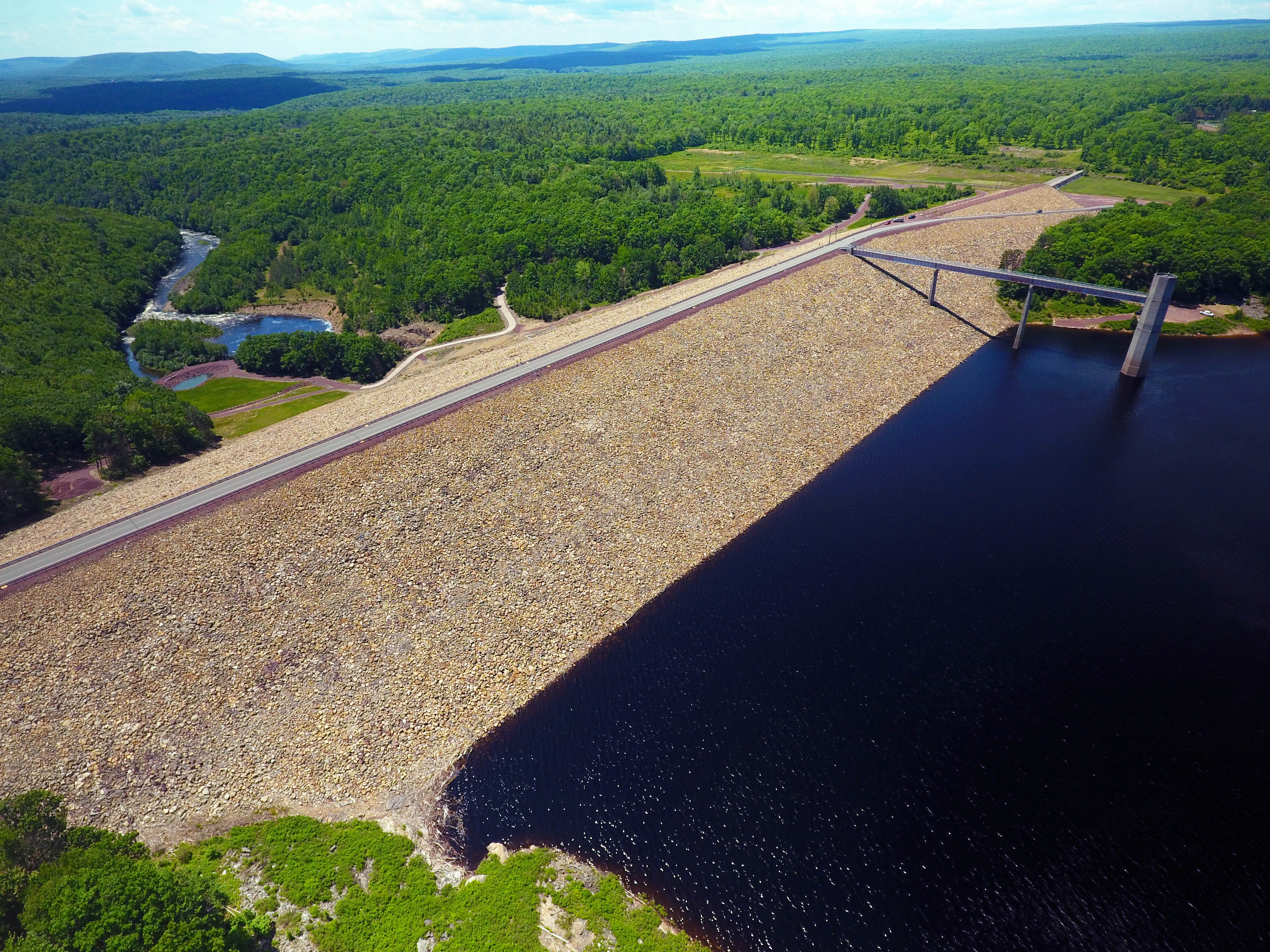
The Francis E. Walter Dam and Reservoir; Bear Creek Township is visible in the background

== Demographics ==
Historical population
Census	Pop.	Note	%±
2000	2,580		—
2010	2,774		7.5%
2020	2,752		−0.8%
2021 (est.)	2,752		0.0%
U.S. Decennial Census

As of the census of 2000, there were 2,580 people, 997 households, and 754 families residing in the township. The population density was 39.0 inhabitants per square mile (15.1/km^{2}). There were 1,216 housing units at an average density of 18.4 units per square mile (7.1 units/km^{2}). The racial makeup of the township was 98.88% White, 0.31% African American, 0.04% Native American, 0.31% Asian, 0.08% from other races, and 0.39% from two or more races. Hispanic or Latino of any race were 0.78% of the population.

There were 997 households, out of which 29.3% had children under the age of 18 living with them, 64.0% were married couples living together, 6.7% had a female householder with no husband present, and 24.3% were non-families. 20.5% of all households were made up of individuals, and 9.2% had someone living alone who was 65 years of age or older. The average household size was 2.55 and the average family size was 2.95.

In the township the population was spread out, with 21.7% under the age of 18, 6.0% from 18 to 24, 25.7% from 25 to 44, 29.2% from 45 to 64, and 17.4% who were 65 years of age or older. The median age was 43 years. For every 100 females, there were 104.4 males. For every 100 females age 18 and over, there were 101.1 males.

The median income for a household in the township was $43,900, and the median income for a family was $49,107. Males had a median income of $36,726 versus $26,053 for females. The per capita income for the township was $19,427. About 4.6% of families and 5.9% of the population were below the poverty line, including 5.1% of those under age 18 and 5.2% of those age 65 or over.

== Gallery ==
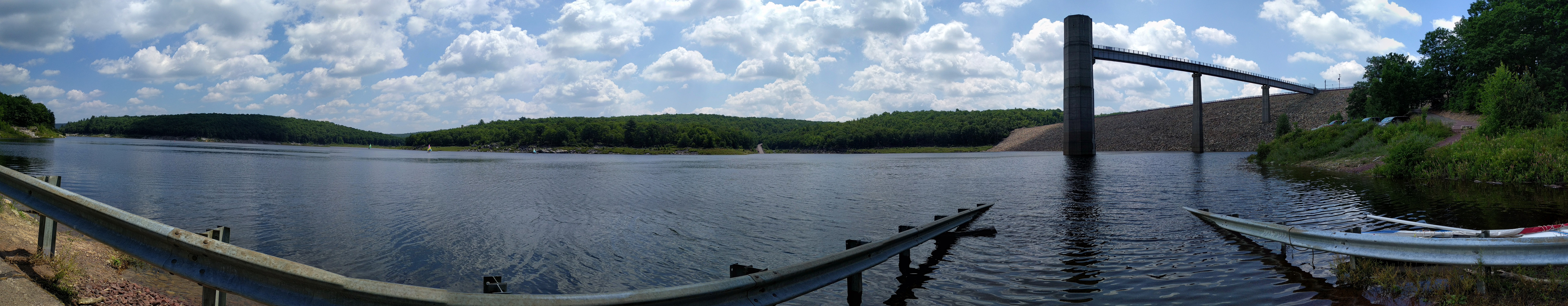
The Francis E. Walter Reservoir and Dam in southern Bear Creek Township
