= Bear Creek Camp Conservation Area =

Park and conservation area in Pennsylvania

Coordinates: 41.216°N 75.755°W

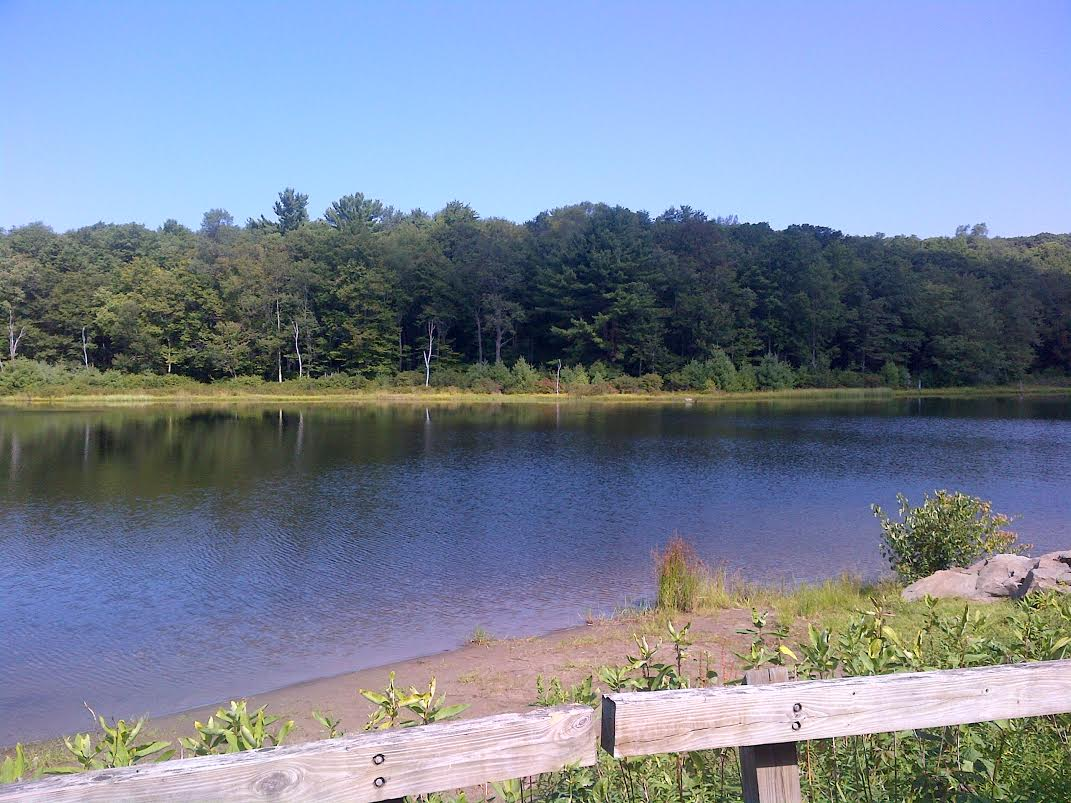
Lake at Bear Creek Camp Conservation Area

Bear Creek Camp Conservation Area is a park and conservation area in Bear Creek Township, Luzerne County, Pennsylvania. It is mostly made up of thick forests, streams, and lakes.

== Activities ==
- Hiking
- Biking
- Fishing
- Boating
- Skiing
- Snowboarding

== Numbered routes ==
- I-476 / Penna Turnpike NE Extension
- PA 115
