= Buck Township, Pennsylvania =

Township in Pennsylvania, US

Coordinates: 41°07′29″N 75°39′14″W

- Township
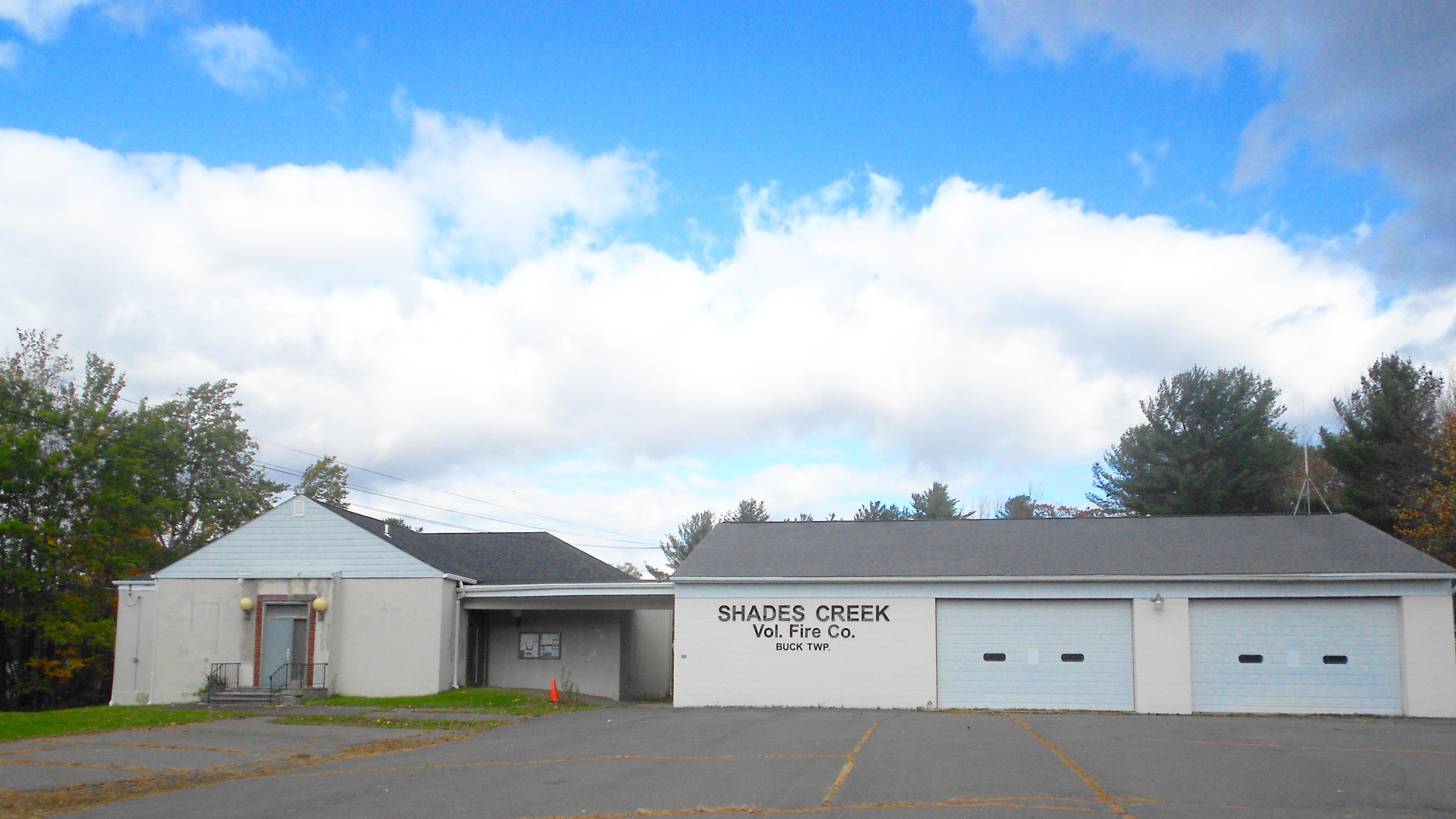
- Municipal Building

- Logo

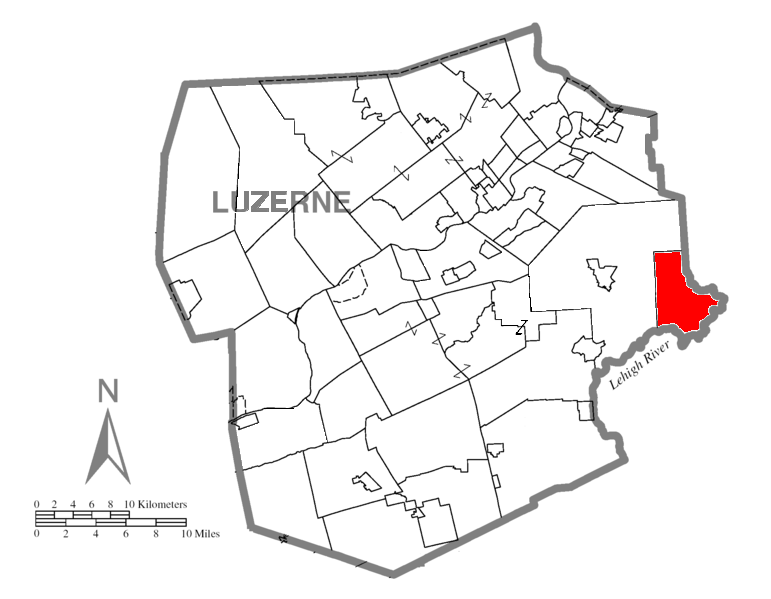
- Map of Luzerne County highlighting Buck Township

- Map of Pennsylvania highlighting Luzerne County
- Country: United States
- State: Pennsylvania
- County: Luzerne

Area
  - Total: 16.80 sq mi (43.52 km^{2})
  - Land: 16.75 sq mi (43.39 km^{2})
  - Water: 0.050 sq mi (0.13 km^{2})

Population (2020)
  - Total: 378 ▼
  - Estimate (2021): 381
  - Density: 25.6/sq mi (9.89/km^{2})
- Time zone: UTC-5 (Eastern (EST))
  - Summer (DST): UTC-4 (EDT)
- FIPS code: 42-079-09760
- Website: bucktownship.org

Buck Township is a township in Luzerne County, Pennsylvania, United States. As of the 2020 census, the population was 378, making it the least populous township in the county.

== History ==
The area was first settled in the 1780s by John Nagle. The first sawmill was erected in 1806 by Hugh Conner. Many more sawmills were constructed in the area throughout the 19th century. John Stoddart established the hamlet of Stoddartsville in 1815. The following year (in 1816), he constructed the first church in the village. The Stoddartsville Historic District was added to the National Register of Historic Places in 1998.

Buck Township was formed from Covington Township is 1833. The new township was named after one of its early settlers — George Buck.

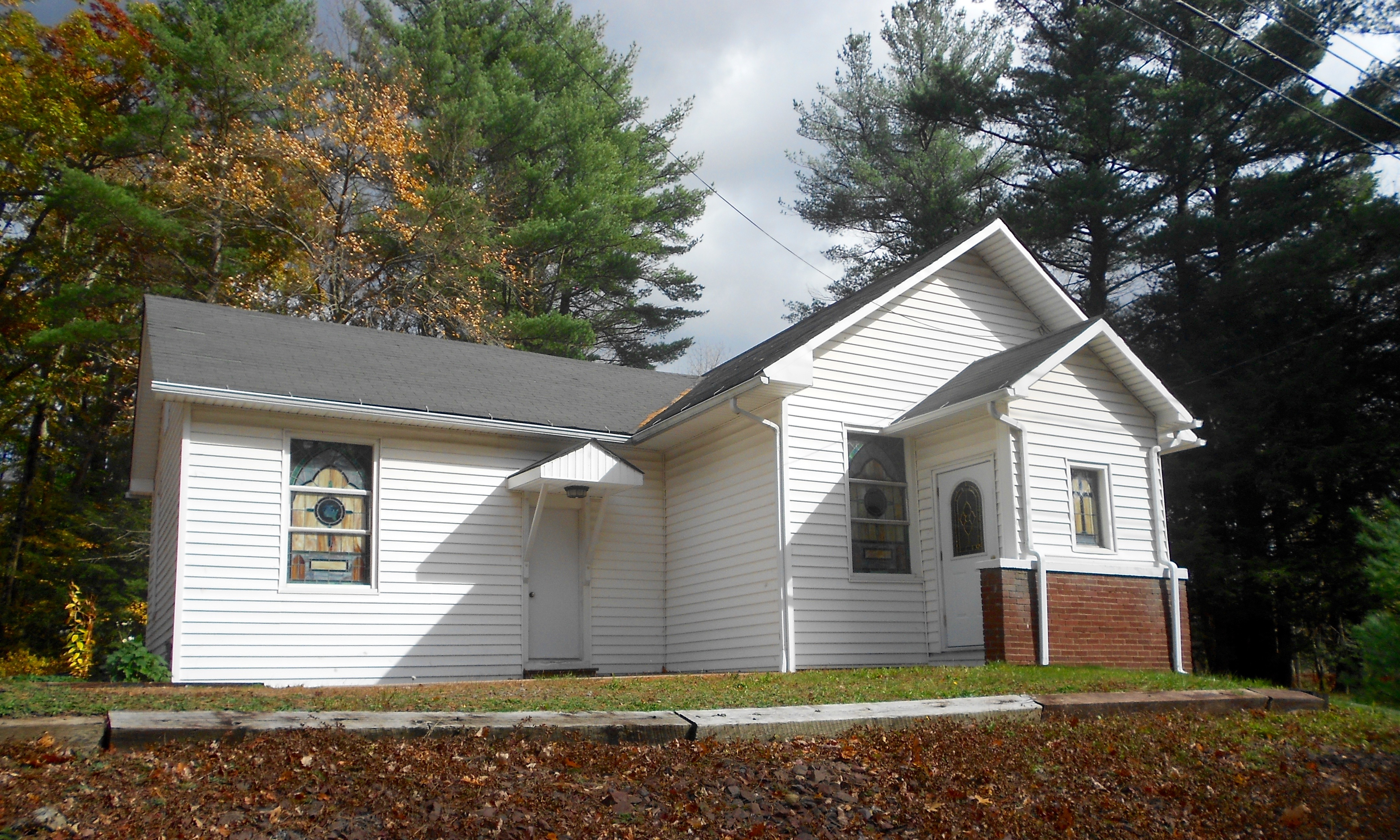
Beaumont Free Methodist Church

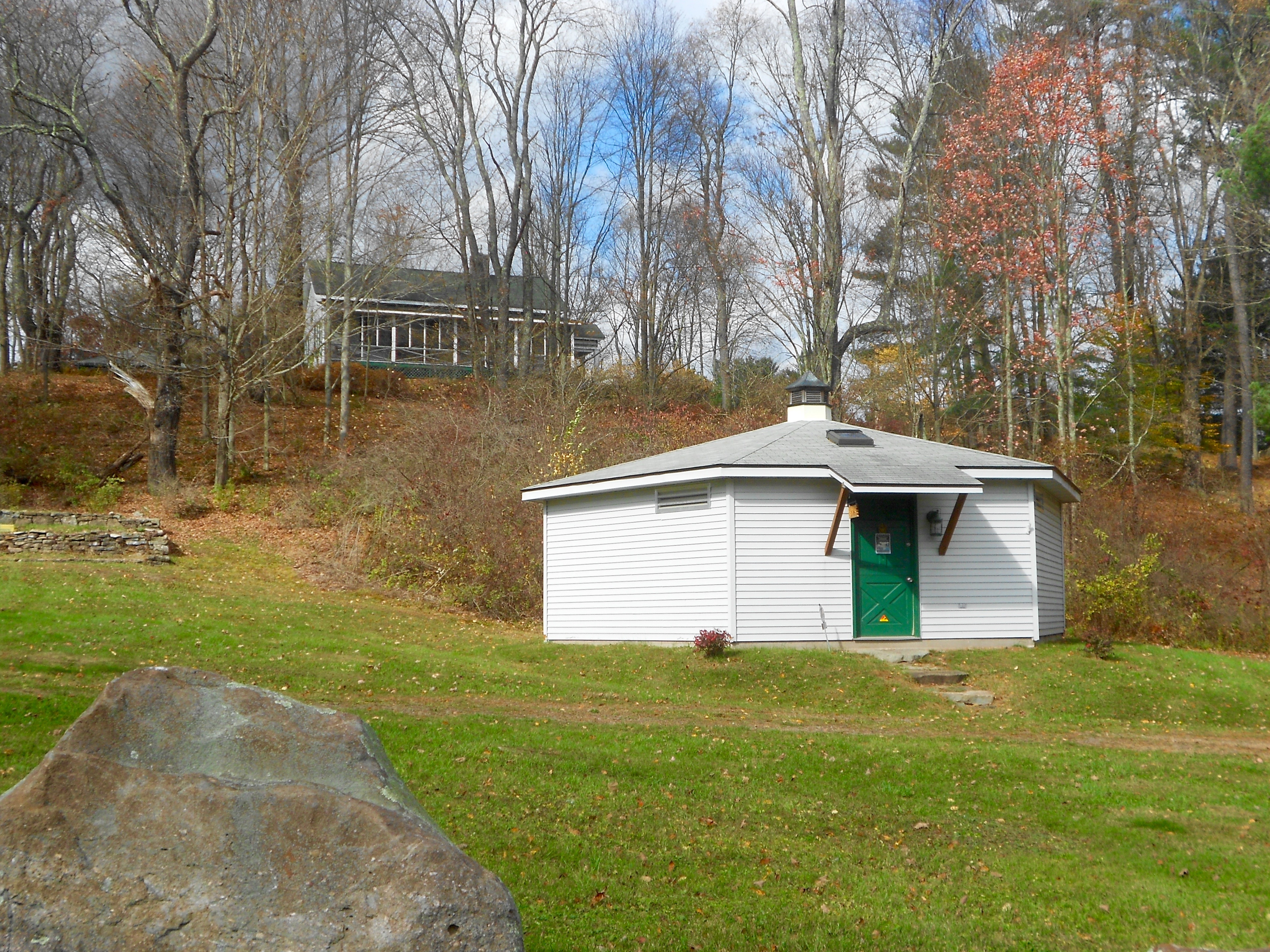
Stoddartsville Preservation Society

== Geography ==
According to the United States Census Bureau, the township has a total area of 17.0 square miles (44 km^{2}), of which 16.9 square miles (44 km^{2}) is land and 0.1 square miles (0.26 km^{2}) (0.29%) is water.

The community is sparsely populated; thick forests cover most of Buck Township. PA 115 is the only major highway in the municipality. Buck is drained by the Lehigh River, which forms its natural southeastern boundary with Monroe County. It has a warm-summer humid continental climate (Dfb) and the hardiness zones are 5a and 5b. Average monthly temperatures in Stoddartsville range from 22.6 °F in January to 68.3 °F in July.

== Demographics ==
Historical population
Census	Pop.	Note	%±
2010	435		—
2020	378		−13.1%
2021 (est.)	381		0.8%

As of the census of 2010, there were 435 people, 178 households, and 120 families living in the township. The population density was 25.7 people per square mile (9.9 people/km^{2}). There were 259 housing units at an average density of 15.3 units per square mile (5.9 units/km^{2}). The racial makeup of the township was 97% White, 1.6% Black, 0.2% American Indian, 0.7% Asian, 0.5% two or more races.

There were 178 households, out of which 20.2% had children under the age of 18 living with them, 53.9% were married couples living together, 7.9% had a female householder with no husband present, and 32.6% were non-families. 25.8% of all households were made up of individuals, and 7.8% had someone living alone who was 65 years of age or older. The average household size was 2.44 and the average family size was 2.95.

In the township the population was spread out, with 17% under the age of 18, 68.1% from 18 to 64, and 14.9% who were 65 years of age or older. The median age was 45.7 years.

The median income for a household in the township was $35,556, and the median income for a family was $37,813. Males had a median income of $32,361 versus $21,875 for females. The per capita income for the township was $15,123. About 3.4% of families and 7.1% of the population were below the poverty line, including 8.0% of those under age 18 and 14.6% of those age 65 or over.
