= Francis E. Walter Dam =

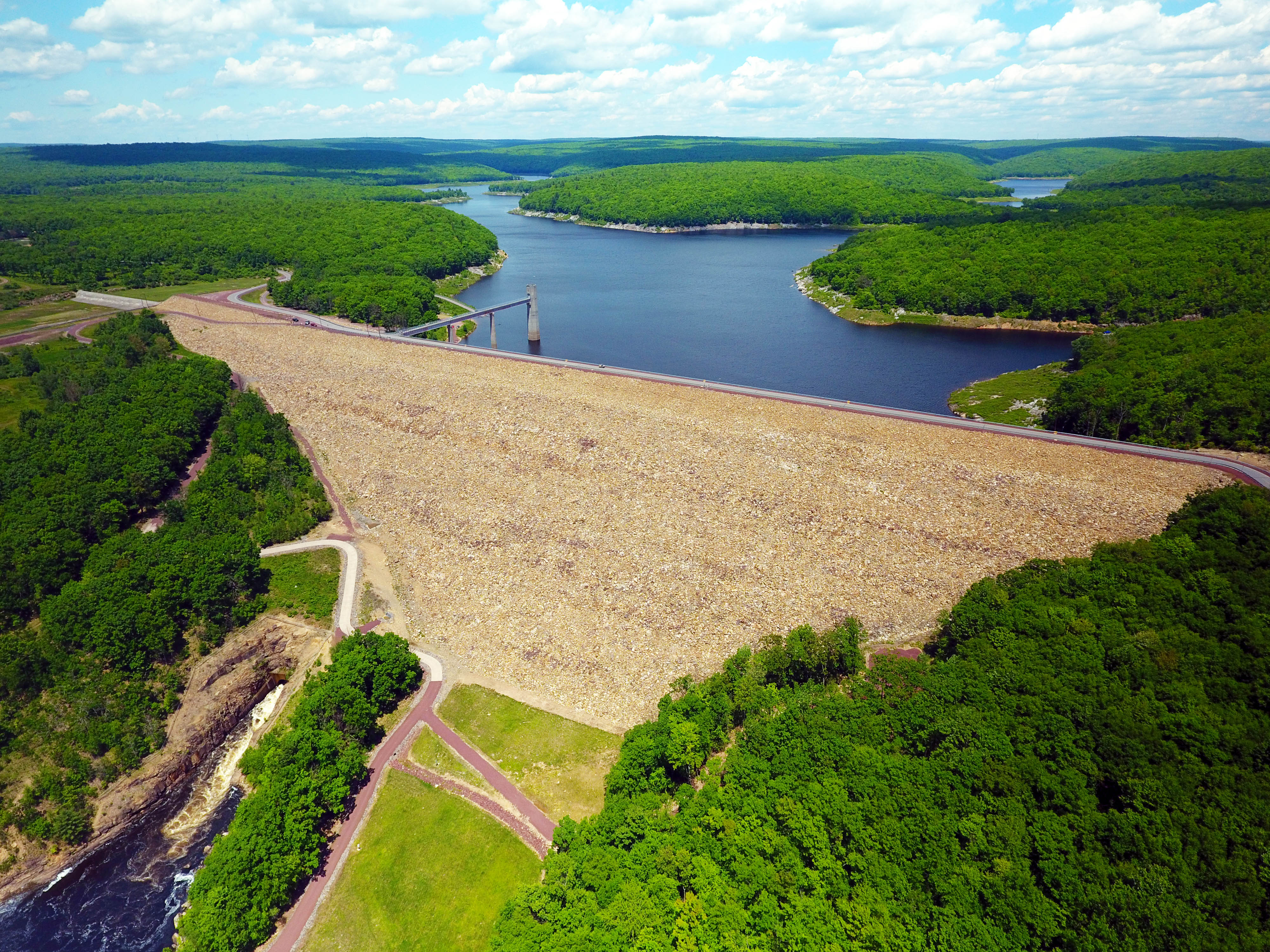
- Outlet and reservoir view of the Francis E. Walter Dam. The outlet can be seen at the bottom left and the reservoir at the top. Bear Creek flows into the reservoir from the left, while the Lehigh River flows from the right.
- Interactive map of Francis E. Walter Dam
- Official name: Francis E. Walter Dam
- Location: Bear Creek Township, Luzerne County and Kidder Township, Carbon County, Pennsylvania, U.S.
- Coordinates: 41°6′45″N 75°43′15″W
- Purpose: Flood control, water storage, recreation
- Status: In use
- Opening date: 1961
- Owner: United States Government
- Operator: United States Army Corps of Engineers

Dam and spillways
- Type of dam: Earth-fill Embankment with Rock Shell
- Impounds: Lehigh River
- Height (foundation): 234 ft (71 m)
- Length: 3,000 ft (910 m)
- Width (crest): 30 ft (9.1 m)
- Width (base): 1,230 ft (370 m)
- Spillway type: Concrete

Reservoir
- Creates: Francis E. Walter Reservoir
- Total capacity: 110,700 acre⋅ft (0.1365 km^{3})
- Catchment area: 289 sq mi (750 km^{2})
- Website; Francis E. Walter Dam Flow Management Plan

The Francis E. Walter Dam is an embankment dam located along the border of Bear Creek Township, Luzerne County and Kidder Township, Carbon County, Pennsylvania, U.S. Constructed in 1961 by the United States Army Corps of Engineers, it spans the Lehigh River at its confluence with the tributary Bear Creek, creating the Francis E. Walter Reservoir. Although the dam was originally constructed for flood management, its reservoir has since become a popular recreational area for fishing, kayaking, and boating. Its original name was Bear Creek Dam, but was renamed for local United States Representative Francis E. Walter in 1963.

== History ==
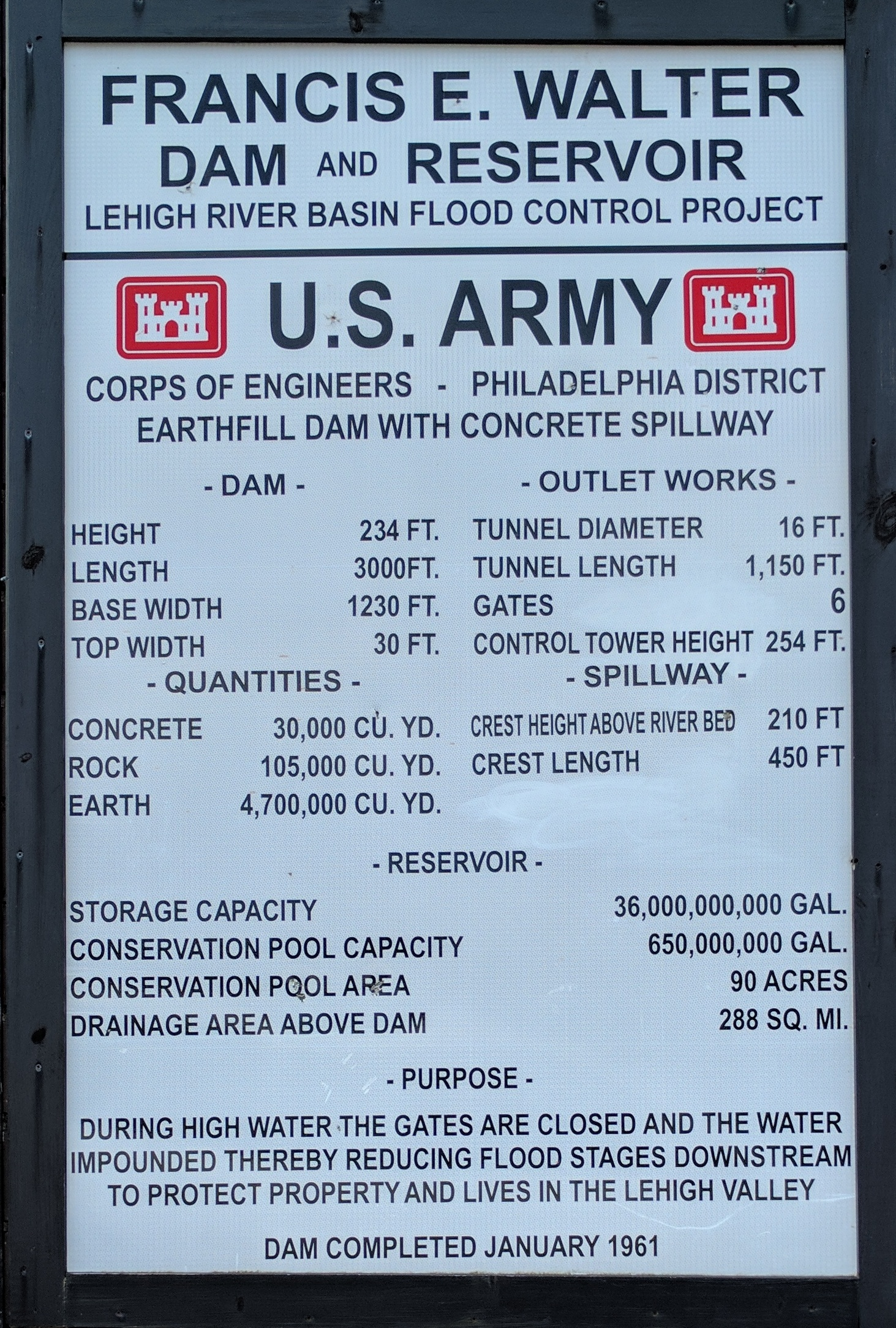
Information sign at the Francis E. Walter Dam

=== Before construction ===
The land on which the dam is built was originally owned by Lehigh Coal & Navigation Company, a vertically integrated company that mined, processed, and transported anthracite coal throughout Pennsylvania. LC&N originally purchased the land with the intention of building hydroelectric dams along the river, but the federal government later condemned the land and bought it from LC&N to build the Francis E. Walter Dam.

Prior to construction of the dam, the Lehigh River was subject to regular massive flooding as a result of large ice dams breaking apart after heavy rain, abruptly releasing all the water built up behind them. The resulting wave would be as high as 30 feet, destroying anything caught in its path. The most famous flood occurring as a result of this phenomenon was in 1861, when ice and timber caught in the wave destroyed dams and locks on the river, flooding settlements several hundred feet from the river's normal bounds.

=== Authorization for recreation ===
In November 1988, Congress passed, and President Reagan signed, the Water Resources Development Act of 1988, which directed the Secretary of the Army to prepare to regulate the Francis E. Walter Reservoir, among other areas, for recreational purposes. Since the dam was originally constructed only for flood management purposes, the federal government lacked the authority to manage the reservoir as a recreational area, despite it already attracting visitors for that purpose. After authority was granted, the federal government was able to staff the area with rangers.

In 2005, the Philadelphia District USACE, Pennsylvania Fish and Boat Commission, Pennsylvania Department of Conservation and Natural Resources, Delaware River Basin Commission, and other stakeholders entered into a partnership to plan water releases so they would simultaneously serve the flood management purposes of the dam and facilitate popular activities like whitewater rafting and fishing. The partnership develops a flow management plan each year that regularly releases water in the summer for whitewater rafting and stores water in the fall and spring to benefit fish populations in the reservoir.

== Recreation ==
=== Boating, kayaking, and canoeing ===
There are two separate launch points into the reservoir: one for motor boats and one for kayaks and other human-powered watercraft. Motor boats are limited to 10 horsepower (7.5 kW), so popular water sports like water-skiing are not feasible in the reservoir.

=== Fishing ===
Fishing is a common activity at the dam, both in the reservoir and the Lehigh River it feeds. Species commonly caught include trout and smallmouth bass. The Pennsylvania Fish and Boat Commission regularly stocks the Lehigh River at the dam with brown and rainbow trout raised in hatcheries at the end of winter to shore up fish populations.

=== Other recreation ===
- Multiple fields for baseball, soccer, a disc golf course, and other sports; they are located near the dam.
- The dam is surrounded by Pennsylvania State Game Lands (where licensed hunters can harvest deer, turkey, and other game).
- Other activities enjoyed by visitors include hiking and picnicking.
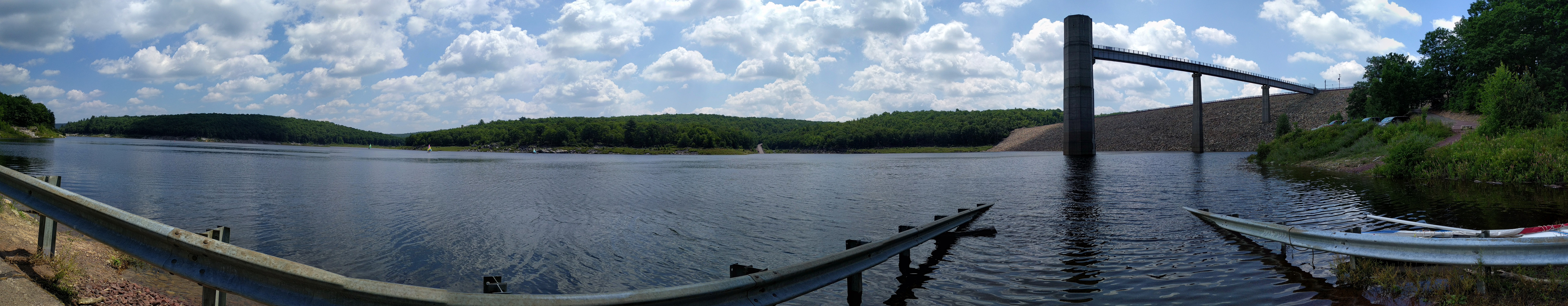
Francis E. Walter Reservoir and Dam as viewed from the kayak launch
