= Bear Creek (Lehigh River tributary) =

River in Pennsylvania, United States

Coordinates: 41.123°N 75.720°W

Bear Creek is a 17.1-mile-long (27.5 km) tributary of the Lehigh River in the Pocono Mountains in Northeastern Pennsylvania, joining the Lehigh River at the Francis E. Walter Reservoir.

== See also ==
- List of rivers of Pennsylvania
