= Bear Creek Village Historic District =

Historic district in Pennsylvania, United States

- U.S. National Register of Historic Places
- U.S. Historic district
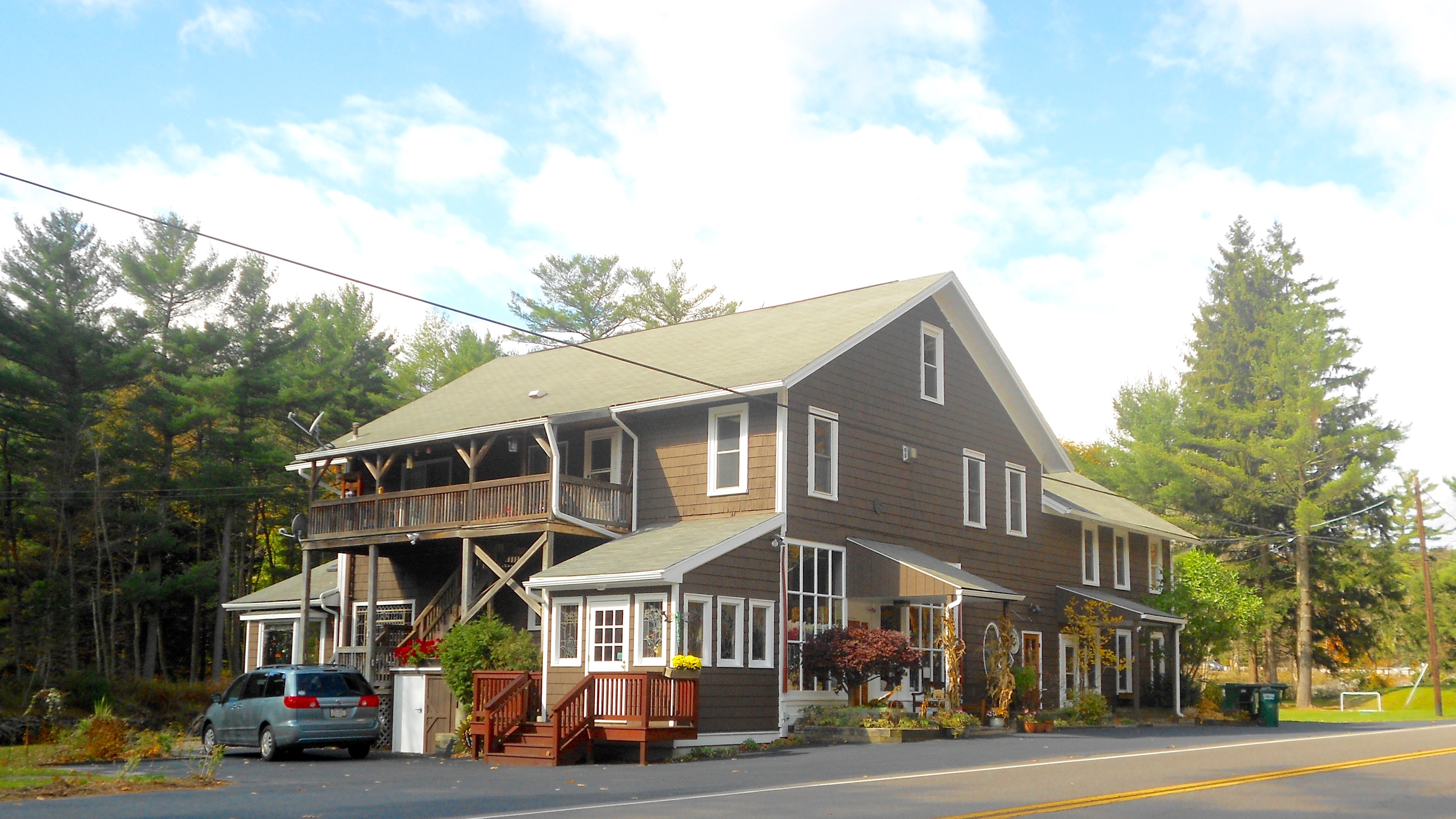
- Former store on White Haven Road

- Location within Pennsylvania Location within the United States
- Location: PA 115 at Bear Creek Dam, Bear Creek Village, Pennsylvania
- Coordinates: 41°11′00″N 75°45′20″W
- Area: 222 acres (90 ha)
- Built: 1881
- Architect: Raife, Phillip R.; et al.
- Architectural style: Stick/eastlake, Colonial Revival
- NRHP reference No.: 99001287
- Added to NRHP: October 28, 1999

The Bear Creek Village Historic District is a national historic district located in Bear Creek Village, Luzerne County, Pennsylvania. The district includes fifty-five contributing buildings, four contributing sites and two contributing structures in the borough of Bear Creek Village.

It was added to the National Register of Historic Places in 1999.

== History and features ==
Composed of fifty-five contributing buildings, four contributing sites and two contributing structures in the borough of Bear Creek Village, this historic district includes houses and workers' cottages, summer cottages, outbuildings, churches, cemeteries, a dam and lake, and the remains of 19th and early 20th century lumbering and ice industries.

Notable contributing resources include the Bear Creek Dam, Albert Lewis Residence (1895, 1922–1923), The Pines (c. 1875), Grace Chapel (1884), the Lewis Family Cemetery, former St. Elizabeth's Catholic Church (1911), store and post office (c. 1885), Bear Creek Association clubhouse (c. 1920), and former Lehigh Valley Railroad Station (c. 1895).

== Gallery ==
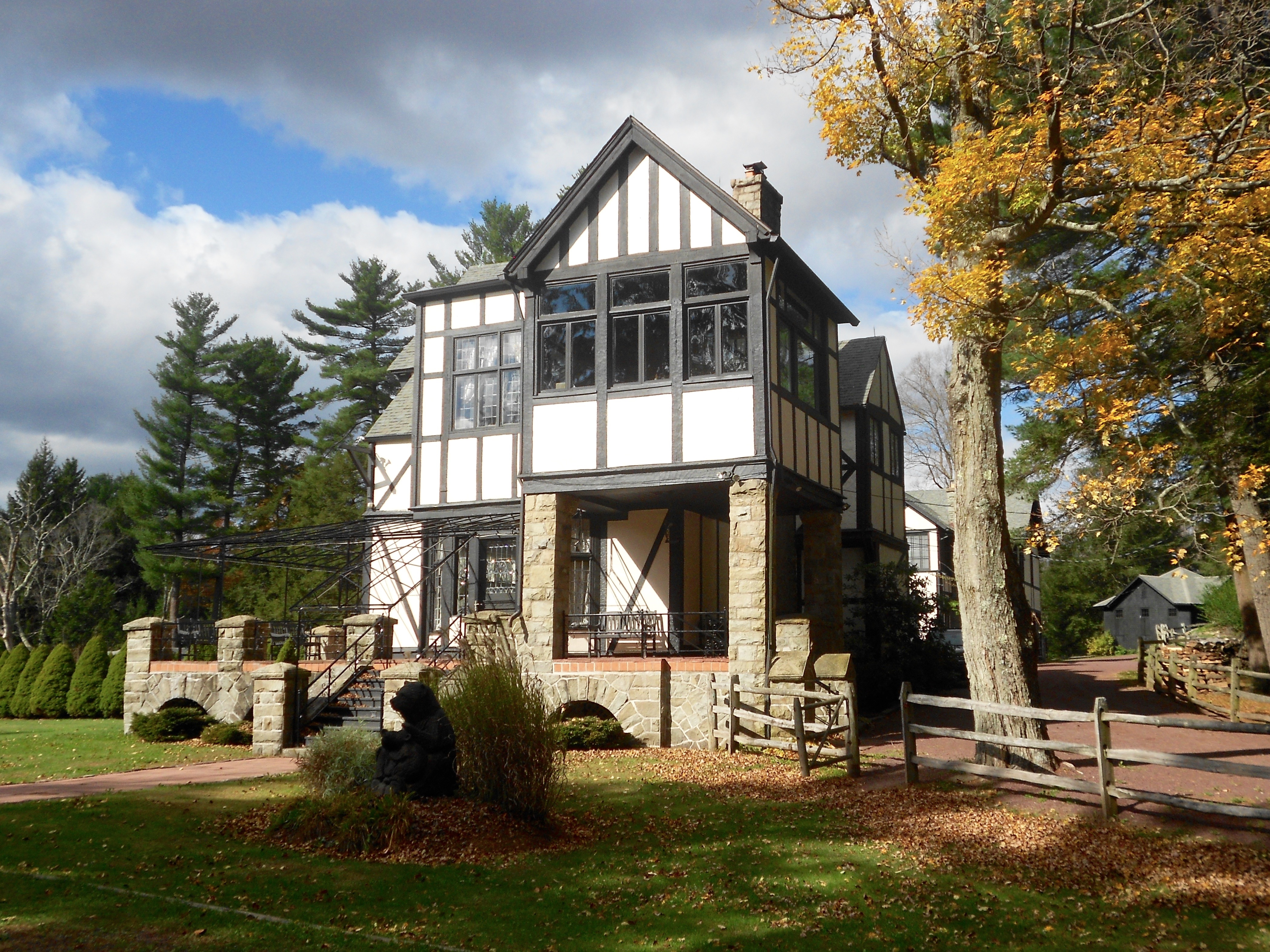
Front of Lewis Mansion
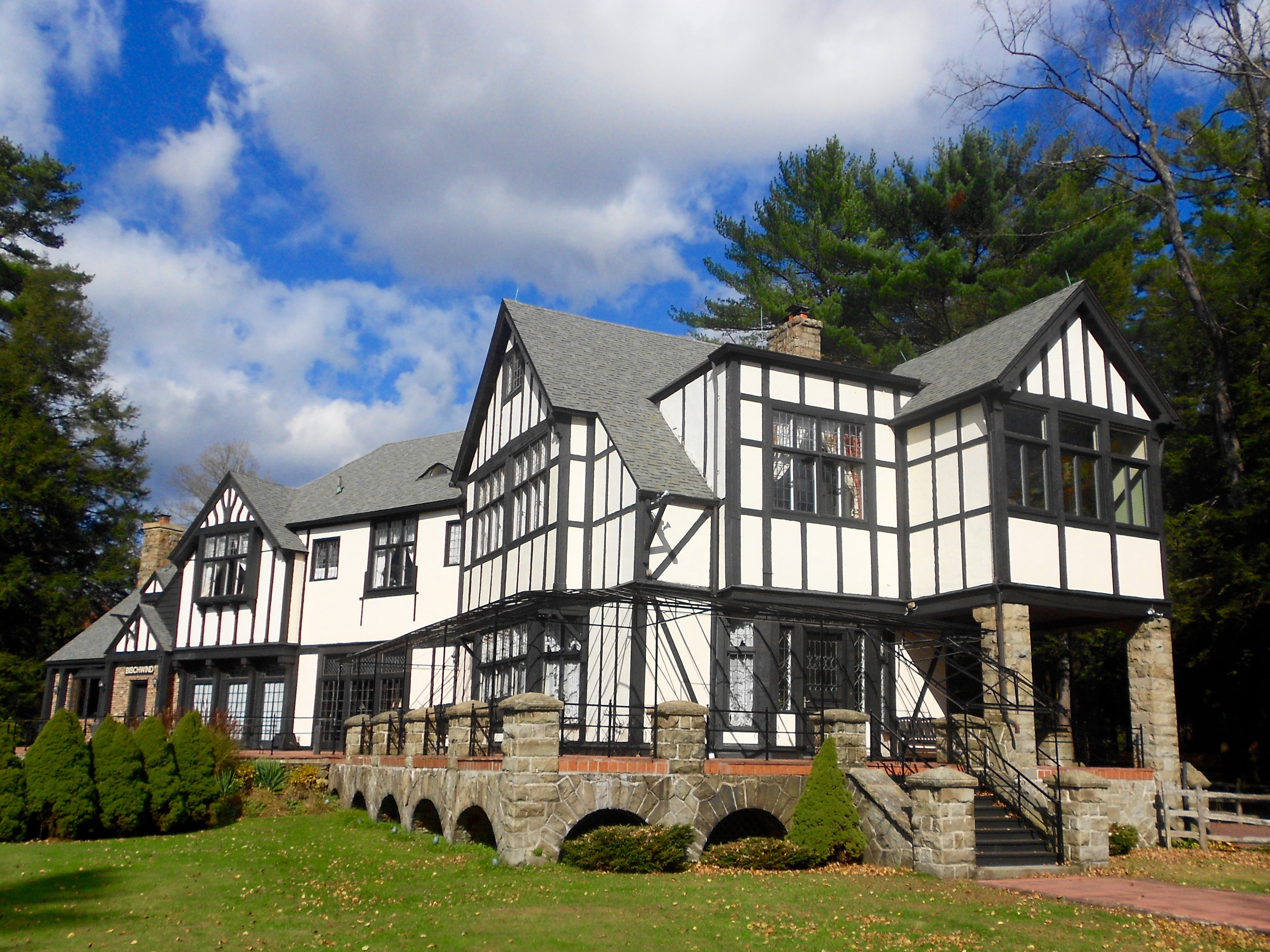
Lewis Mansion
