= Pocono Peak Lake =

Lake in Pennsylvania, United States

- Location within Pennsylvania Location within the United States
- Location: Wayne County, Pennsylvania, U.S.
- Coordinates: 41°16′41.52″N 75°24′21.6″W
- Primary outflows: Lehigh River
- Basin countries: United States
- Surface area: 93 acres (38 ha)
- Surface elevation: 2,054 ft (626 m)

Pocono Peak Lake is a lake in Lehigh Township, Wayne County, Pennsylvania in the United States. The lake is the origin of the Lehigh River.

== See also ==
- List of lakes in Pennsylvania
