= Henry C. Bradsby =

- Occupations: Historian and biographer
- Writing career
- Language: English
- Subject: United States local history

Colonel Henry C. Bradsby, often credited as H.C. Bradsby, was a late 19th-century American historian and biographer. Many of his works are extensive local histories of various United States counties in Illinois, Missouri, Indiana and Pennsylvania, several of which totaled more than a thousand pages.

== Works ==
- History of Arkansas
- Battle of Gettysburg
- History of Illinois
- History of Bureau County, Illinois (1885)
- History of Cumberland and Adams Counties, Pennsylvania (1886) with Aaron Sheely, M.A. Leeson, and others
- History of Columbia and Montour Counties, Pennsylvania (1887) with Samuel P. Bates, H.C. Bell, J.H. Battle
- Commemorative Biographical and Historical Record of Kane County, Illinois (1888)
- History of Vigo County, Indiana, with Biographical Selections (1891)
- History of Bradford County, Pennsylvania, with Biographical Selections (1891)
- History of Luzerne County Pennsylvania (1893)
