= Bear Creek Village, Pennsylvania =

Borough in Pennsylvania, US

- Borough
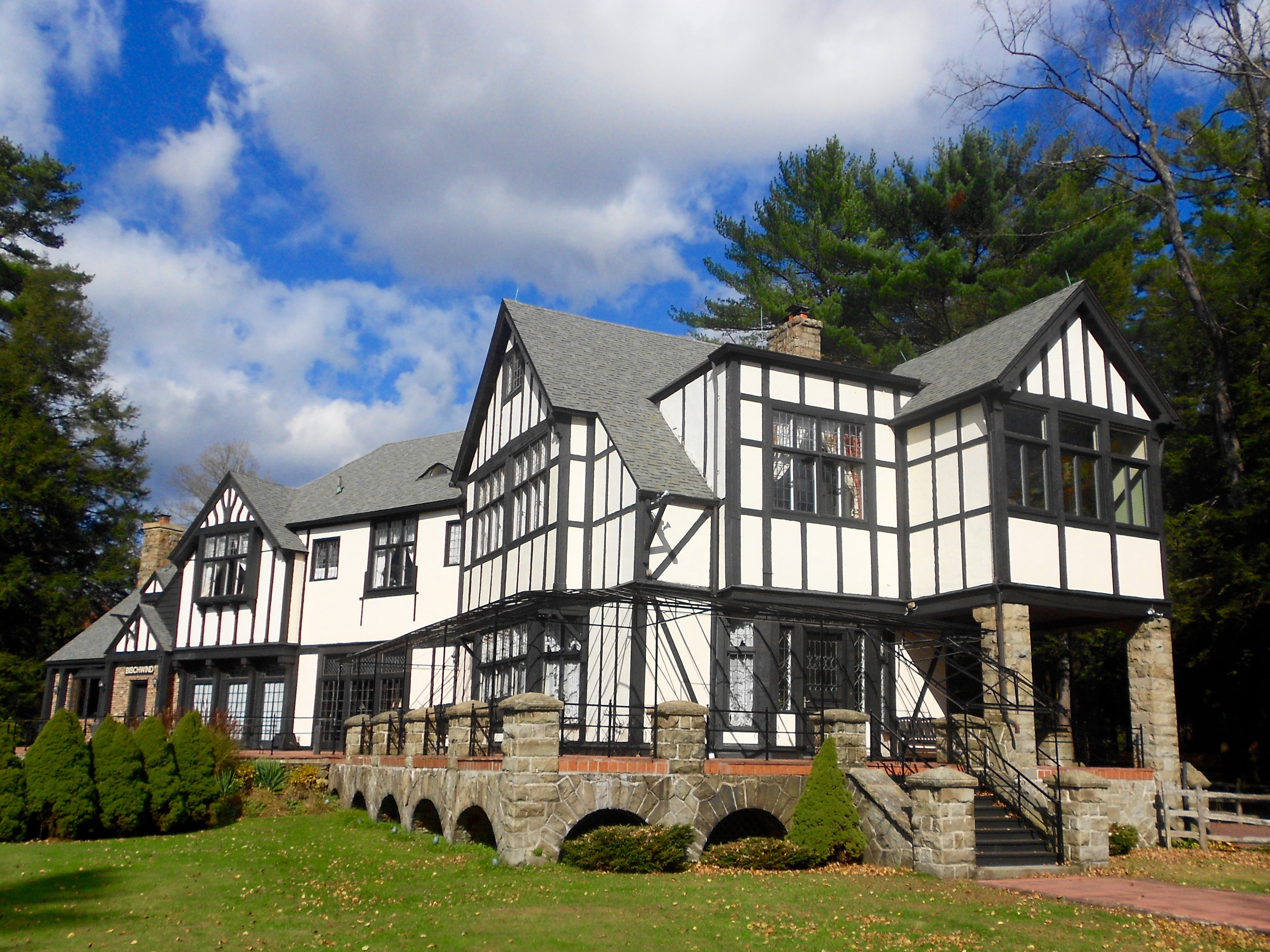
- Lewis Mansion

- Location of Bear Creek Village in Luzerne County, Pennsylvania.

- Location within Pennsylvania Location within the United States
- Coordinates: 41°10′54″N 75°45′11″W
- Country: United States
- State: Pennsylvania
- County: Luzerne
- Settled: 1779
- Incorporated: 1993

Government
  - Type: Borough Council

Area
  - Total: 1.99 sq mi (5.16 km^{2})
  - Land: 1.90 sq mi (4.91 km^{2})
  - Water: 0.097 sq mi (0.25 km^{2})
- Elevation: 1,522 ft (464 m)

Population (2020)
  - Total: 291
  - Density: 153.5/sq mi (59.26/km^{2})
- Time zone: UTC-5 (Eastern (EST))
  - Summer (DST): UTC-4 (EDT)
- ZIP codes: 18602, 18702
- Area code(s): 570
- FIPS code: 42-04599
- Website: https://home.bearcreekvillageborough.org/

Bear Creek Village is a borough in Luzerne County, Pennsylvania, United States. The population was 290 at the 2020 census.

== History ==
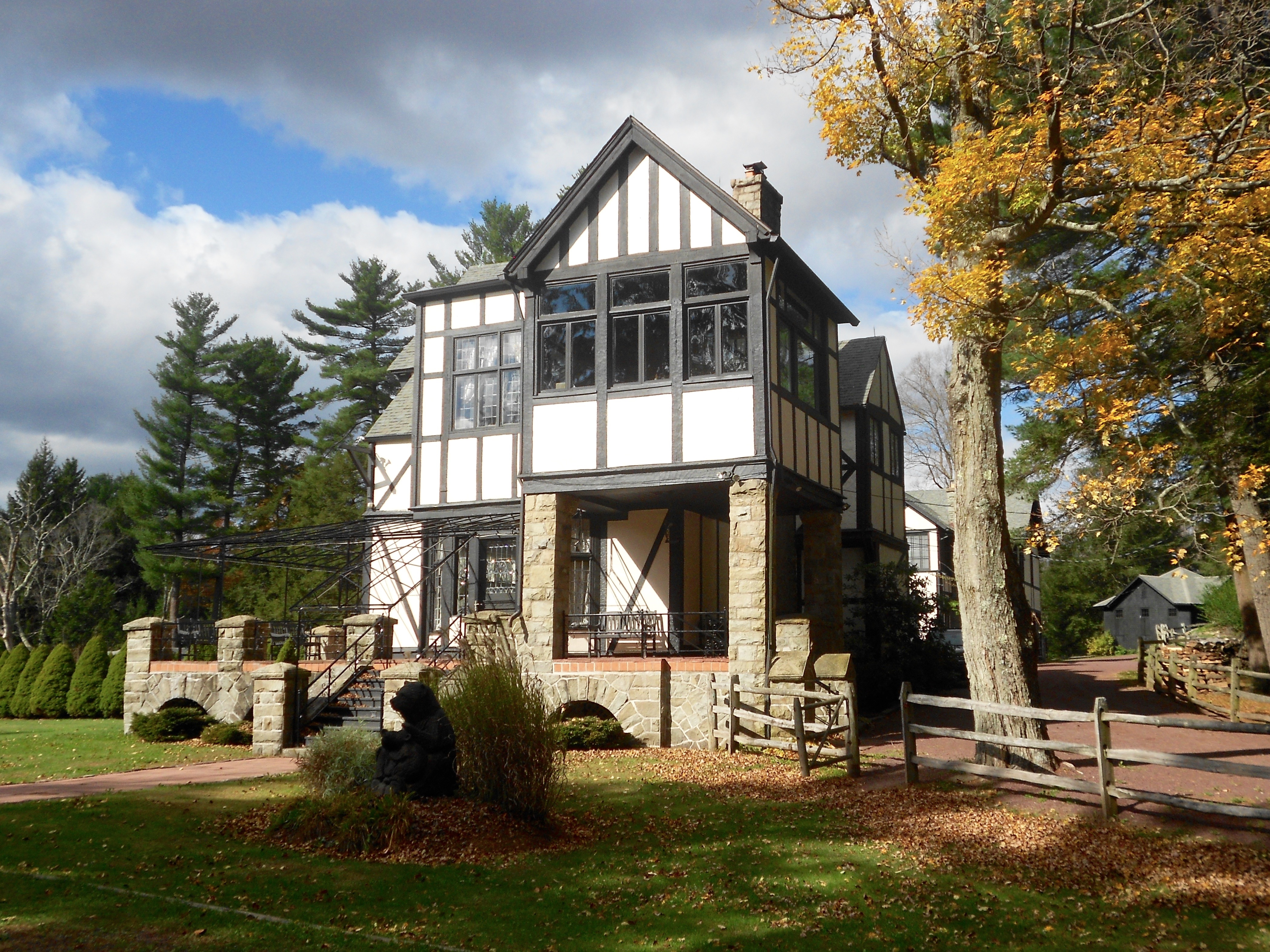
Front of Lewis Mansion

Bear Creek was first settled in the 1770s. The village's development was closely tied to the lumber and ice industries, spearheaded by entrepreneur Albert Lewis (1840–1923), who became known as the "Lumber and Ice King of Luzerne County". Lewis founded the Bear Creek lumber and ice operations, creating a company town that included workers' cottages, outbuildings, and industrial facilities.

On August 25, 1993, the village broke away from Bear Creek Township and became a borough. The Bear Creek Village Historic District was added to the National Register of Historic Places in 1999.

== Geography ==
Bear Creek Village is located at 41°10′54″N 75°45′11″W (41.181794, -75.752985).

According to the United States Census Bureau, the borough has a total area of 2.0 square miles (5.3 km^{2}), of which 1.9 square miles (5.0 km^{2}) is land and 0.12 square miles (0.3 km^{2}), or 4.84%, is water.

== Demographics ==
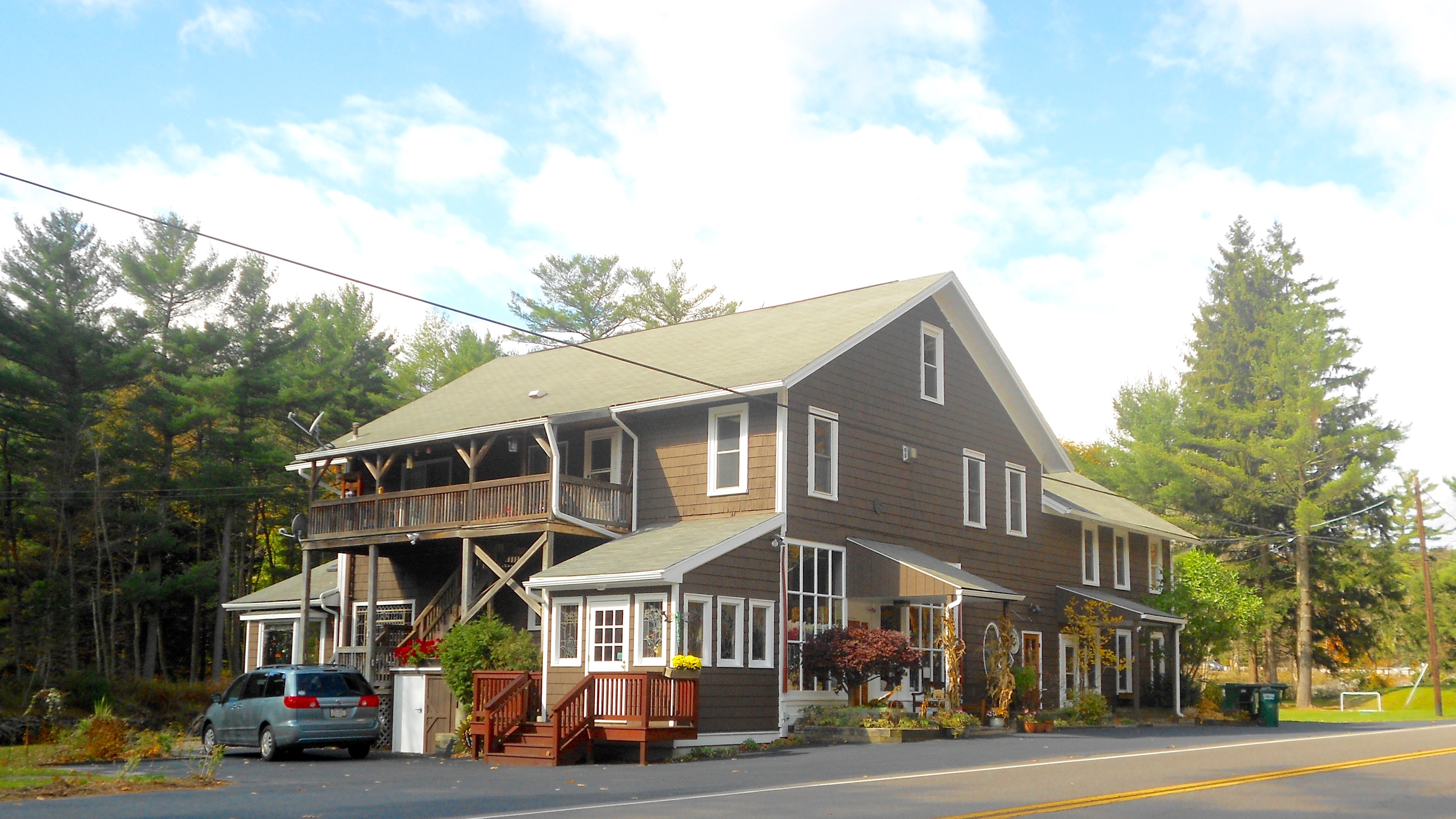
Former store on White Haven Road

Historical population
Census	Pop.	Note	%±
2000	284		—
2010	257		−9.5%
2020	291		13.2%
2021 (est.)	290	▼	−0.3%

As of the census of 2000, there were 284 people, 122 households, and 81 families living in the borough. The population density was 153.3 inhabitants per square mile (59.2/km^{2}). There were 134 housing units at an average density of 72.3 units per square mile (27.9 units/km^{2}). The racial makeup of the borough was 99.65% White and 0.35% Asian. Hispanic or Latino of any race were 0.70% of the population.

There were 122 households, out of which 23.8% had children under the age of 18 living with them, 63.1% were married couples living together, 2.5% had a female householder with no husband present, and 32.8% were non-families. 28.7% of all households were made up of individuals, and 9.8% had someone living alone who was 65 years of age or older. The average household size was 2.33 and the average family size was 2.90.

In the borough the population was spread out, with 20.4% under the age of 18, 4.2% from 18 to 24, 20.8% from 25 to 44, 34.2% from 45 to 64, and 20.4% who were 65 years of age or older. The median age was 47 years. For every 100 females there were 97.2 males. For every 100 females age 18 and over, there were 98.2 males.

The median income for a household in the borough was $60,000, and the median income for a family was $71,250. Males had a median income of $53,750 versus $38,125 for females. The per capita income for the borough was $33,324. None of the families and 2.2% of the population were living below the poverty line, including no under eighteens and 2.9% of those over 64.

== Education ==
It is in the Wilkes-Barre Area School District.
