= Lehigh River =

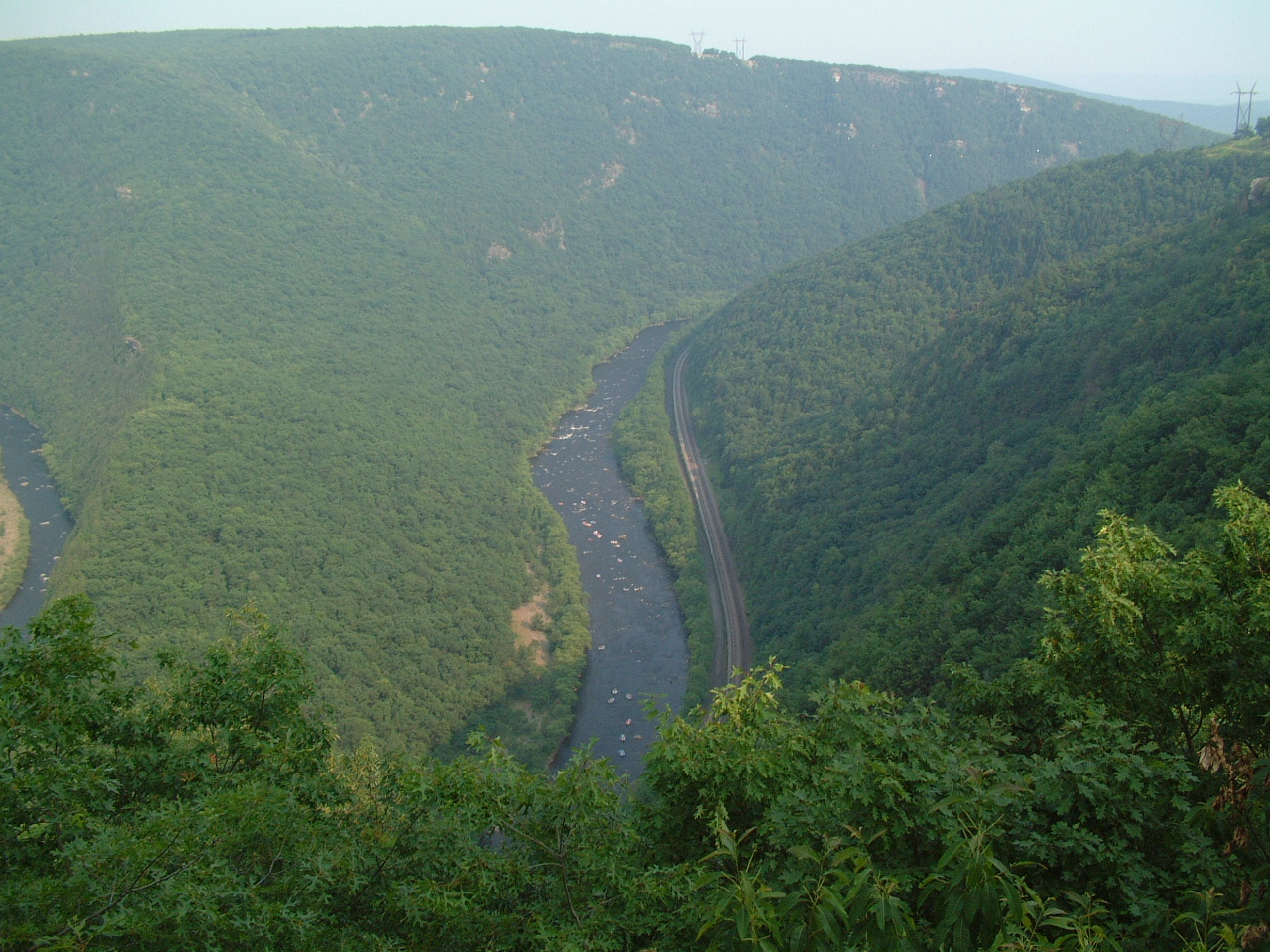
- The Lehigh River near Jim Thorpe, Pennsylvania in June 2002

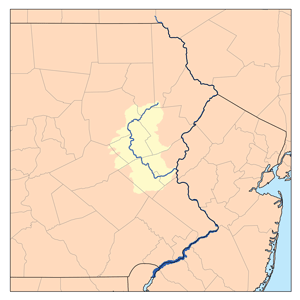
- The Lehigh River watershed highlighted in yellow

Location
- Country: United States
- State: Pennsylvania
- Counties: On the river: Wayne, Lackawanna, Monroe, Luzerne, Carbon, Lehigh, Northampton, Watershed: Wayne, Lackawanna, Monroe, Luzerne, Carbon, Lehigh, Northampton, Schuylkill, Berks, Bucks
- Cities: Lehighton, Allentown, Bethlehem, Easton

Physical characteristics
- Source: Pocono Peak Lake
  - location: Lehigh Township, Wayne County, Pennsylvania, U.S.
  - coordinates: 41°16′42″N 75°24′22″W
  - elevation: 2,056 ft (627 m)
- Mouth: Delaware River
  - location: Easton, Northampton County, Pennsylvania, U.S.
  - coordinates: 40°41′20″N 75°12′17″W
  - elevation: 160 ft (49 m)
- Length: 109 mi (175 km)
- Basin size: 1,345 sq mi (3,480 km^{2})
- Discharge
  - location: Glendon
  - average: 3,740 cu ft/s (106 m^{3}/s)
  - minimum: 1,160 cu ft/s (33 m^{3}/s)
  - maximum: 11,700 cu ft/s (330 m^{3}/s)
- Discharge
  - location: Stoddartsville
  - average: 280 cu ft/s (7.9 m^{3}/s)

Basin features
- Tributaries
  - left: Tobyhanna Creek, Drakes Creek, Bear Creek (Lehigh River), Pohopoco Creek, Aquashicola Creek, Hokendauqua Creek, Monocacy Creek, and Catasauqua Creek
  - right: Black Creek, Nesquehoning Creek, Mauch Chunk Creek, Mahoning Creek, Lizard Creek, Little Lehigh Creek, and Saucon Creek

The Lehigh River (/ˈliːhaɪ/) is a 109-mile-long (175 km) tributary of the Delaware River in eastern Pennsylvania. The river flows in a generally southward pattern from the Pocono Mountains in Northeastern Pennsylvania through Allentown and much of the Lehigh Valley before joining the Delaware River in Easton.

Part of the Lehigh River and a number of its tributaries are designated Pennsylvania Scenic Rivers by the state's Department of Conservation and Natural Resources.

The river's name is an anglicisation of the Lenape name for the river, Lechewuekink, which means "where there are forks". Both Lehigh County and Lehigh Valley are named for the river.

Between 1821 and 1966, the Lehigh River was owned by the Lehigh Coal and Navigation Company, making it the only privately owned river in the United States. This private ownership continued until a local representative, Samuel Frank, promoted a bill to return control of the river to the state in 1967.

According to an environmental report from a Pennsylvania nonprofit research center, the Lehigh River watershed is ranked second nationally in the volume of toxic substances released into it in 2020. The study mirrored a previous report by the state's Department of Environmental Protection that found most of the county's waterways unsafe for swimming or aquatic life.

== Course ==
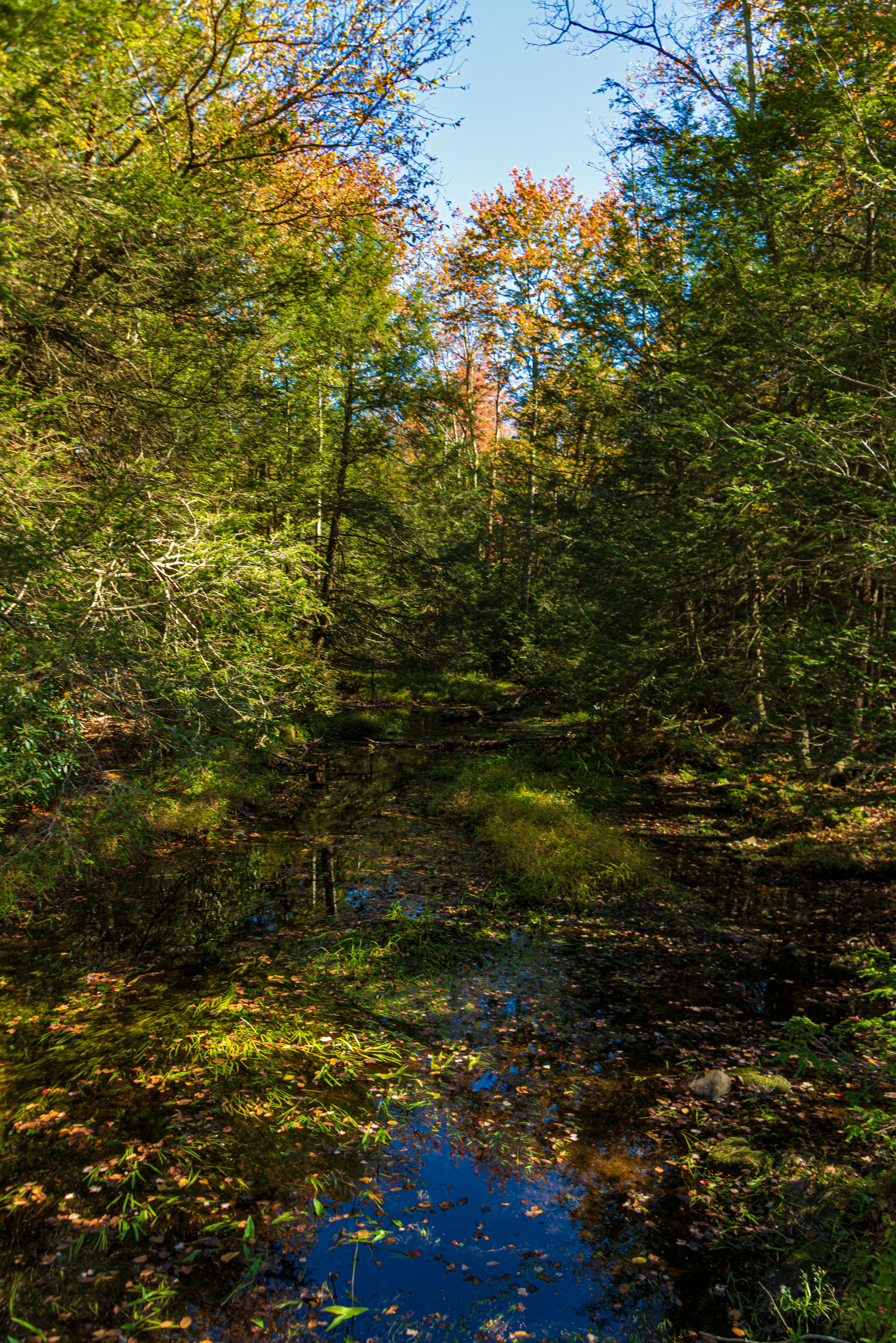
The Lehigh near its source in Wayne County

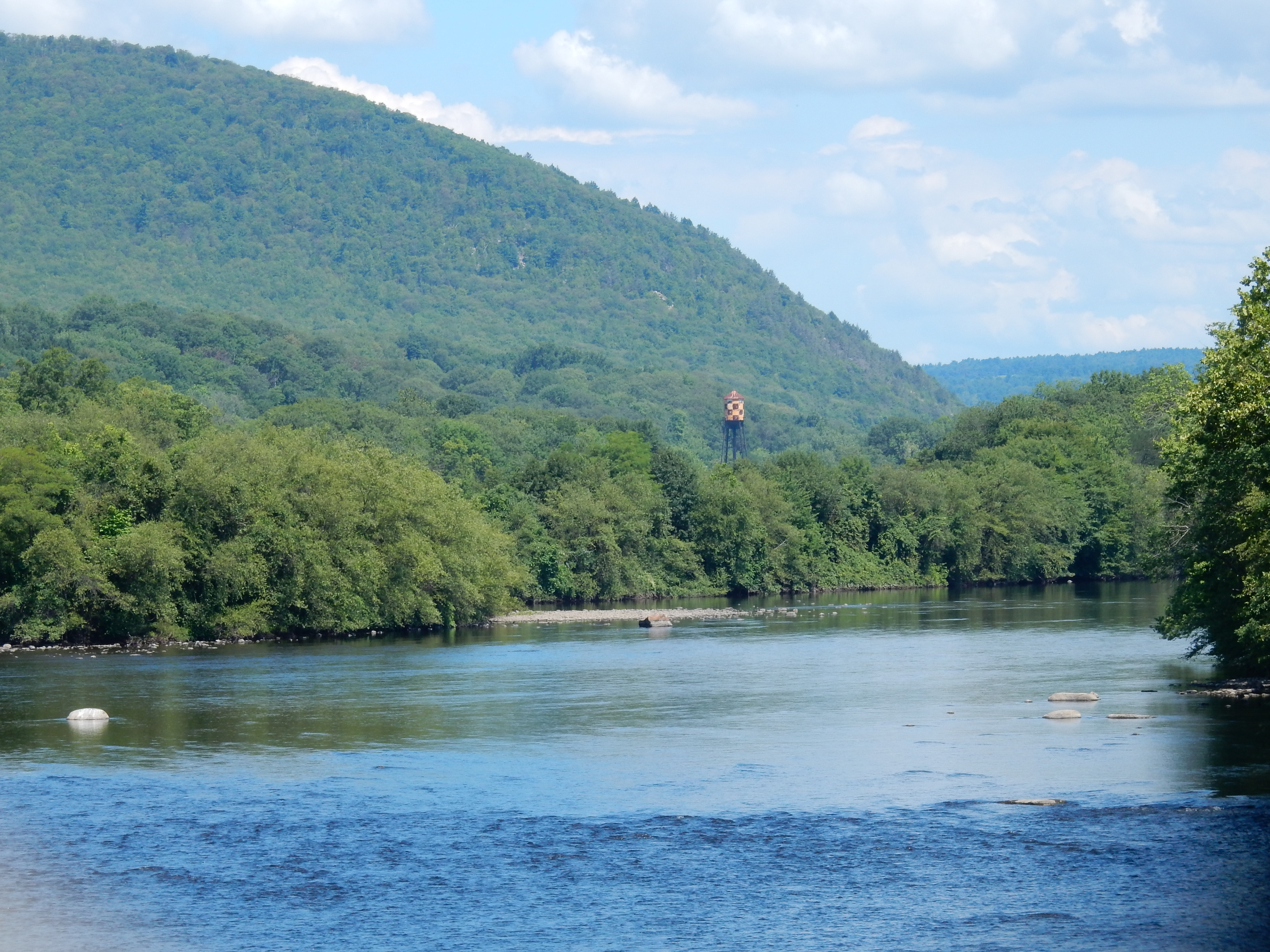
The Lehigh River at Walnutport in the Lehigh Valley in August 2015

The Lehigh River flows in a highly winding course through valleys between ridges of Pennsylvania's Appalachian Mountains. Its upper course is characterized by numerous whitewater rapids and supports recreational pursuits, including rafting, kayaking, and canoeing. Its lower course forms the heart of the Lehigh Valley, a historically important anthracite coal and steel-producing region of Pennsylvania.

The river rises in the Poconos region of northeastern Pennsylvania in several ponds in Lehigh Township in Wayne County, approximately 15 miles (24 km) southeast of Scranton. The PA Gazetteer of Streams shows that the Lehigh River begins as the outflow of Pocono Peak Lake. Flowing south from the south end of the lake (a natural but dammed body of water), the river turns west after a mile and receives water from many lakes and ponds as it flows past Gouldsboro.

It flows initially southwest, forming part of the border between Lackawanna County, Wayne County and Monroe County, passing through Francis E. Walter Dam. Near White Haven, it turns south, following a zigzag whitewater course through Lehigh Gorge State Park to Jim Thorpe, then southeast, past Lehighton. Southeast of Lehighton, it passes through Blue Mountain in the narrow opening at Lehigh Gap. A six-mile stretch of the river between Freemansburg and Easton is known as the "dry-lands" because all of the water from rain drainage flows underground.

From the Lehigh Gap, the river flows southeast to Allentown, where it is joined by Little Lehigh Creek, then northeast past Bethlehem, where it joins the Delaware River in Easton at Pennsylvania's border with northwestern New Jersey.

== Fishing ==
The Lehigh River holds many species of fish, including trout, smallmouth bass, largemouth bass, pickerel, panfish, carp, catfish, eel, and muskie. Rainbow trout, brown trout, and brook trout in the 11"-14" range are average, while some have been caught in the 20" range. Smallmouth bass are large in numbers but are of smaller size with most between 8"-14" with an occasional fish from the 18"-21" range. There is an increasing number of muskie being reported within the 30"-52" range. There are both pure and tiger muskie, the usually sterile, hybrid offspring of the true muskellunge (Esox masquinongy) and the northern pike (Esox lucius) being caught in the river.

Over the years since 2005 various groups such as the Lehigh Coldwater Fishery Alliance and the Pennsylvania Fish and Boat Commission have worked with the Army Corps of Engineers to design annual flow plans from the Frances Walter Dam (F.E.W.) to maximize the cold water discharge through the spring and summer. This has helped enhance the population of coldwater species like brown trout to gain a growing naturally reproducing population within the river below F.E.W. dam all the way to Northampton.

== Whitewater rafting and tubing ==
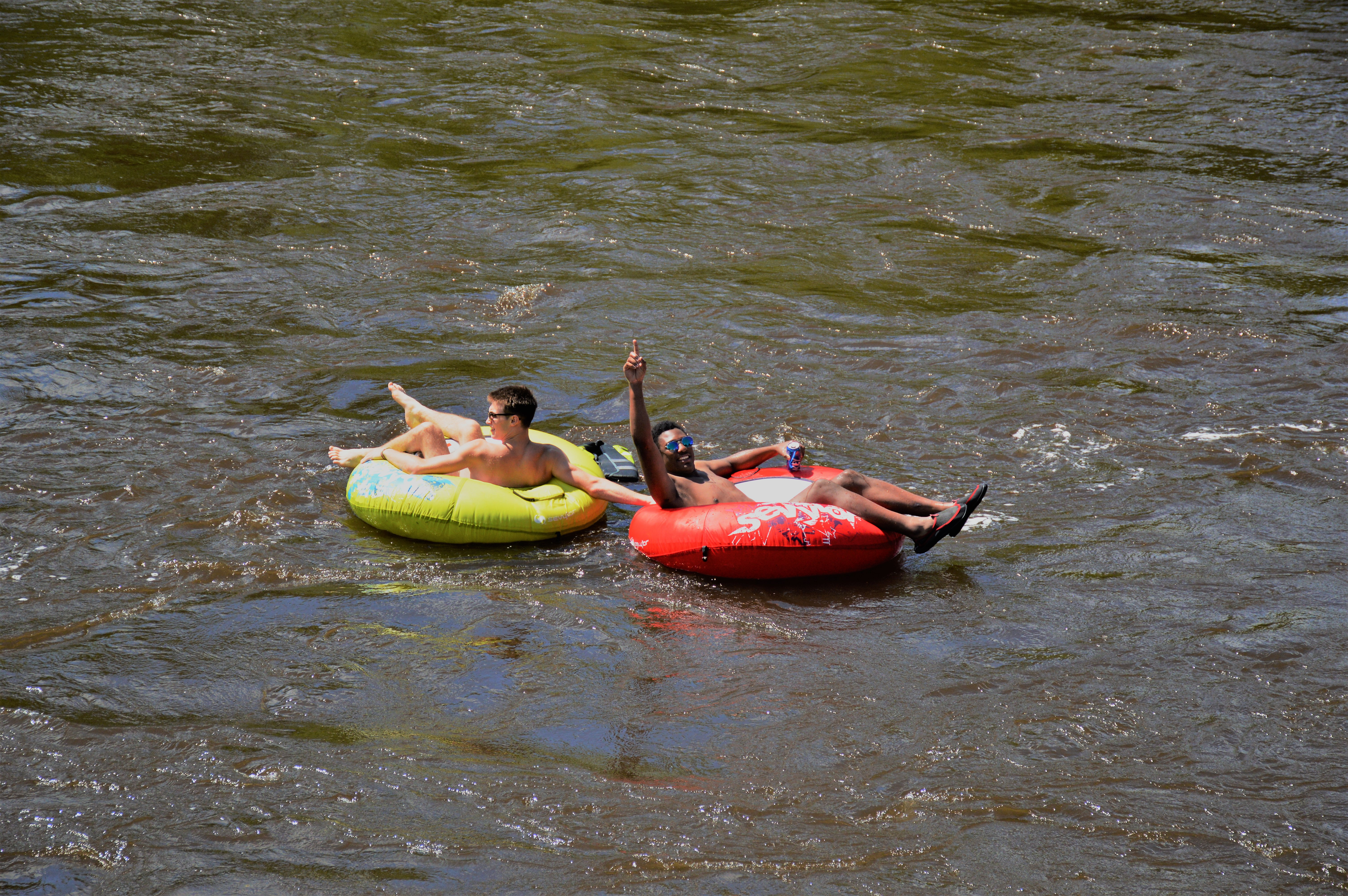
Water tubers in the Lehigh River in June 2020

The Lehigh River is a whitewater river with Class I, II, and III rapids. The most popular section of the Lehigh River for whitewater rafting, kayaking, and canoeing is through the Lehigh Gorge State Park. The Lehigh Gorge State Park begins at the Francis E. Walter Dam and ends in Jim Thorpe. Several white water outfitters operate guided white water rafting trips in various sections of the river. The first rafting outfitter on the Lehigh River was Whitewater Challengers, which was founded in 1975. Water releases from the Francis E. Walter Dam provide enough water to make the river deep enough for boating. Three popular boating trips on the Lehigh River are:

- White Haven to Rockport – 8.7 miles
- Rockport to Glen Onoko – 12.2 miles
- White Haven to Glen Onoko – 20.9 miles

== See also ==
- Delaware and Lehigh National Heritage Corridor
- Lehigh Canal
- List of Pennsylvania rivers
