= Towamensing Trails, Pennsylvania =

Unincorporated community in Pennsylvania, US

- Census-designated place
- Location of Towamensing Trails in Pennsylvania Towamensing Trails (the United States)
- Coordinates: 40°59′42″N 75°35′0″W
- Country: United States
- State: Pennsylvania
- County: Carbon
- Township: Penn Forest

Area
  - Total: 6.2 sq mi (16.1 km^{2})
  - Land: 5.9 sq mi (15.4 km^{2})
  - Water: 0.27 sq mi (0.7 km^{2})
- Elevation: 1,810 ft (550 m)

Population (2010)
  - Total: 2,292
  - Density: 386/sq mi (148.9/km^{2})
- Time zone: UTC-5 (Eastern (EST))
  - Summer (DST): UTC-4 (EDT)
- ZIP code: 18210
- Area codes: 570 and 272
- FIPS code: 42-77163
- GNIS feature ID: 1212327

Towamensing Trails is a census-designated place (CDP) in Penn Forest Township, Pennsylvania, United States. It is part of Northeastern Pennsylvania. Towamensing was once home to the Lenni Lenapes (Delaware) Indians. The land became part of Pennsylvania as a result of the infamous "Walking Purchase".

The community is located directly south of Albrightsville in the southern part of the Poconos, bordered by Pennsylvania Route 903 on the northwest, separating it from Albrightsville, and by Pennsylvania Route 534 on the northeast. PA 903 leads southwest 12 miles (19 km) to Jim Thorpe, the Carbon County seat, and north 7 miles (11 km) to Interstate 80 near Blakeslee, while PA 534 leads south 9 miles (14 km) to U.S. Route 209 and west through Hickory Run State Park 14 miles (23 km) to White Haven.

== Education ==
It is in the Jim Thorpe Area School District.
