= Albrightsville, Pennsylvania =

Unincorporated community in Pennsylvania, US

- Census-designated place
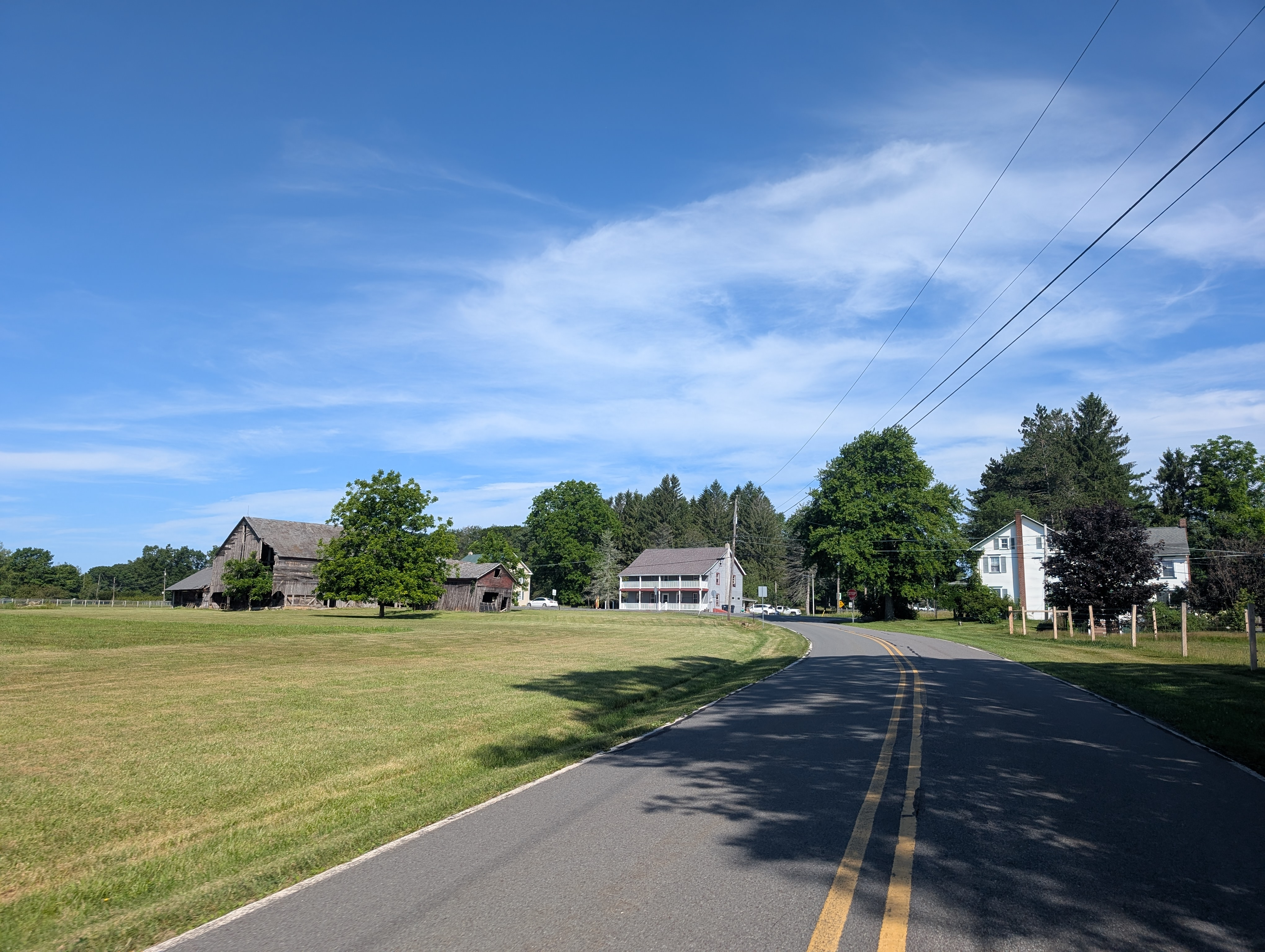
- Along North Old Stage Road

- Location in Pennsylvania Albrightsville (the United States)
- Coordinates: 41°0′52″N 75°36′3″W
- Country: United States
- State: Pennsylvania
- County: Carbon
- Townships: Kidder, Penn Forest

Area
  - Total: 1.01 sq mi (2.61 km^{2})
  - Land: 1.01 sq mi (2.61 km^{2})
  - Water: 0 sq mi (0.00 km^{2})
- Elevation: 1,510 ft (460 m)

Population (2020)
  - Total: 138
  - Density: 136.8/sq mi (52.82/km^{2})
- Time zone: UTC−5 (Eastern (EST))
  - Summer (DST): UTC−4 (EDT)
- ZIP code: 18210
- Area code(s): 570
- FIPS code: 42-00652
- GNIS feature ID: 1168122

Albrightsville is an unincorporated community and census-designated place which is located in the Kidder and Penn Forest townships, Carbon County, Pennsylvania, United States. As of the 2020 census, Albrightsville had a population of 138. It is part of Northeastern Pennsylvania.

== Demographics and geography ==
As of the 2020 census, Albrightsville's population was 138.

It is drained by Mud Run (which forms the township boundary) westward into the Lehigh River. Pennsylvania Routes 534 and 903 intersect at the eastern corner of the village. Although it has its own post office with the ZIP code of 18210, areas just to the north and west use the Lake Harmony ZIP code of 18624.

The Holiday Pocono community is directly to the north, across Pennsylvania 534, and Towamensing Trails is directly across Pennsylvania 903 to the southeast. The community is just east of Hickory Run State Park.

The community has a warm-summer humid continental climate (Dfb) and the average monthly temperature ranges from 23.5 °F (−4.7 °C) in January to 68.5 °F (20.3 °C) in July. The hardiness zone is 5b and the average annual absolute minimum temperature is −13.4 °F (−25.2 °C).

Old Albrightsville Cemetery, also known as Henning's Cemetery, has interments from the 1850s all the way up to 1976. It is looked after by Paul's Lutheran Church of Kidder Township.

Historical population
Census	Pop.	Note	%±
2020	138		—
U.S. Decennial Census

== Education ==
Albrightsville is in the Jim Thorpe Area School District.

== Notable people ==
- Aquila Henning (1892-1932), who's unique gravestone carving depicts his alleged murder on Thanksgiving in 1932
- Bryan Kohberger, perpetrator of the 2022 University of Idaho killings, born and raised in Albrightsville
- George Nikolakakos, American politician that is a member of the Republican Party, born and raised in Albrightsville
