= Pennsylvania Route 903 =

State highway in Pennsylvania, US

Pennsylvania Route 903

Route information
- Maintained by PennDOT
- Length: 17.733 mi (28.538 km)
- Existed: 1928–present

Major junctions
- South end: US 209 in Jim Thorpe
- I-476 / Penna Turnpike NE Extension in Penn Forest Township; PA 534 / US 209 Truck in Kidder Township
- North end: PA 115 / US 209 Truck in Tunkhannock Township

Location
- Country: United States
- State: Pennsylvania
- Counties: Carbon, Monroe

Highway system
- Pennsylvania State Route System; Interstate; US; State; Scenic; Legislative
← PA 902	→ PA 904

Pennsylvania Route 903 (PA 903) is a 17.7-mile-long (28.5 km) state highway located in Carbon and Monroe counties in Pennsylvania. The southern terminus is at U.S. Route 209 (US 209) in Jim Thorpe. The northern terminus is at PA 115 in Tunkhannock Township. The route runs through rural areas of the Pocono Mountains, with an interchange with the Pennsylvania Turnpike Northeast Extension (Interstate 476, I-476) in Penn Forest Township and a junction with PA 534 in Kidder Township. PA 903 is a two-lane undivided road nearly its entire length, besides the I-476 intersection. The route was designated in 1928 between US 209/US 309 in present-day Jim Thorpe, and a connecting road, now PA 115, south of Blakeslee. The highway was fully paved in the 1930s. Between 2008 and 2015, an E-ZPass-only interchange was constructed with I-476.

== Route description ==
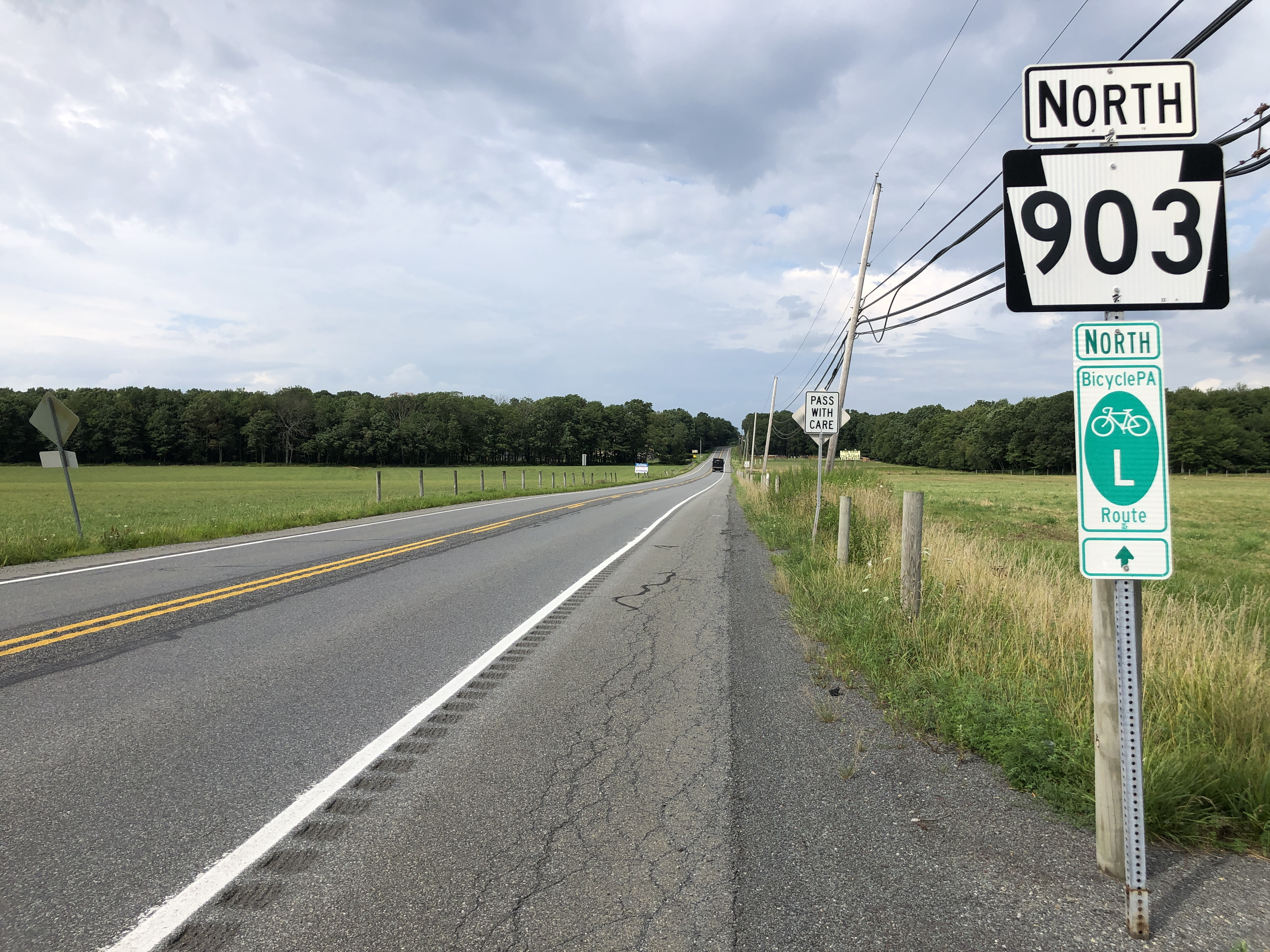
PA 903 northbound in Penn Forest Township

PA 903 begins at an intersection with US 209 in the borough of Jim Thorpe in Carbon County, heading northeast on two-lane undivided North Street. The road immediately comes to a bridge over the Reading Blue Mountain and Northern Railroad's Lehigh Division line, the Lehigh River, and Norfolk Southern's Lehigh Line. After this bridge, the route heads into residential areas. PA 903 continues past more homes with some businesses before turning east into forested areas as an unnamed road.

The road heads into Penn Forest Township, running northeast through more forests with some residences and agricultural clearings. The route heads through forested areas with some wooded residential subdivisions, running through Christmans and reaching a diamond interchange with I-476 (Pennsylvania Turnpike Northeast Extension). PA 903 heads through more dense forests, crossing through a portion of Hickory Run State Park before passing to the west of the residential development of Towamensing Trails. The road crosses into Kidder Township and intersects PA 534.

The route heads north at this point and passes through a mix of woods and fields with some development before continuing back into dense forests and turning northeast near the Big Boulder Ski Resort and Big Boulder Lake to the south of the community of Lake Harmony. PA 903 enters Tunkhannock Township in Monroe County and runs parallel to the Tunkhannock Creek located to the northwest as it continues to its northern terminus at PA 115.

== History ==
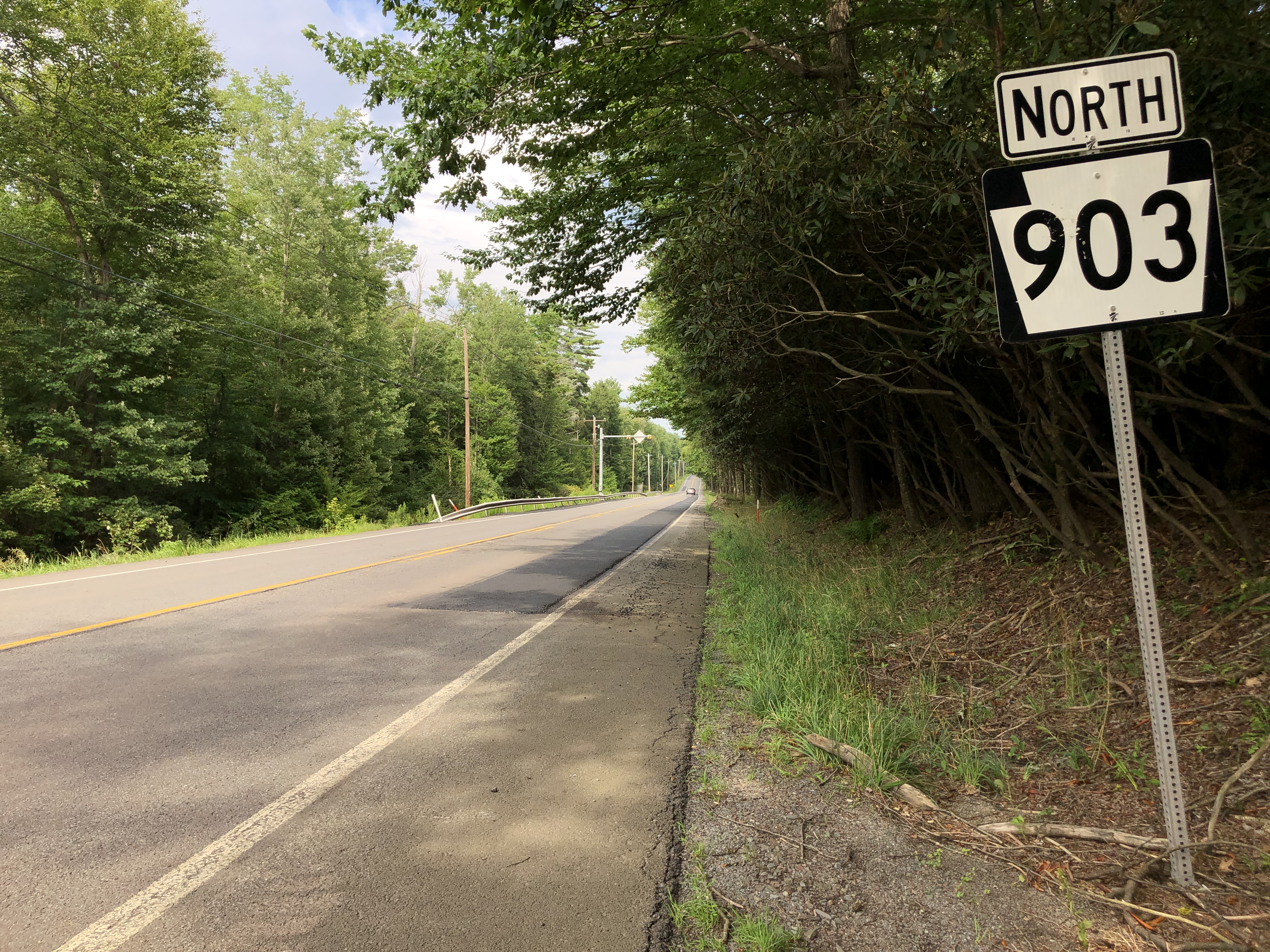
PA 903 northbound in Kidder Township

PA 903 was originally called the Huffman Trail. When Pennsylvania first designated legislative routes with the Sproul Road Bill in 1911, the present-day alignment of PA 903 was not given a legislative route number. PA 903 was designated in 1928 to run from US 209/US 309 in present-day Jim Thorpe northeast to an unimproved connecting road south of Blakeslee. At this time, all the route was unpaved except for a small portion to the northeast of Mauch Chunk. By 1930, the route was paved southwest to East Mauch Chunk while the state highway was under construction northeast to Christmans. The entire length of PA 903 was paved during the 1930s, at which point PA 115 was designated along the intersecting road at the northern terminus.

In 1990, plans were made to build an interchange with the Pennsylvania Turnpike Northeast Extension in Carbon County. A bill authorizing construction of this interchange was signed into law by Governor Robert P. Casey in July of that year. The proposal for this interchange was cancelled by the Pennsylvania Turnpike Commission in 1995. In 2006, plans for the interchange between I-476 and PA 903 were resurrected, with the proposed interchange to be all-electronic, in that it will only accept E-ZPass. Construction on the $23 million interchange began in the middle of 2008. The interchange opened to traffic on June 30, 2015.

The original bridge carrying PA 903 over the Lehigh River was constructed in 1953 and located 940 feet (290 m) downstream of the current bridge. It was replaced in July 2016 as the original bridge was structurally deficient. The new bridge, connecting at its north end directly to the intersection of North Street and Front Street, is formally named Sgt. Andrew J. "AJ" Baddick Bridge. Prior to the construction of the new bridge, PA 903 traveled along parts of River Street and Front Street on the north bank of the river.

== Major intersections ==
County	Location	mi	km	Destinations	Notes
Carbon	Jim Thorpe	0.000	0.000	US 209 (Lehigh Avenue) – Lehighton, Nesquehoning, Tamaqua	Southern terminus
Carbon	Penn Forest Township	10.509	16.913	I-476 Toll / Penna Turnpike NE Extension – Scranton, Allentown	Exit 87 on I-476 / Penna Turnpike NE Extension; former PA 9
Carbon	Kidder Township	13.735	22.104	PA 534 / US 209 Truck south – Hickory Run State Park, Kresgeville	Southern end of US 209 Truck concurrency
Monroe	Tunkhannock Township	17.733	28.538	PA 115 / US 209 Truck north to I-80 – Blakeslee, Wilkes-Barre, Brodheadsville	Northern terminus; northern end of US 209 Truck concurrency
1.000 mi = 1.609 km; 1.000 km = 0.621 mi: Concurrency terminus; Electronic toll collection
