= Holiday Pocono, Pennsylvania =

Unincorporated community in Pennsylvania, US

- Census-designated place
- Location within Pennsylvania Location within the United States
- Coordinates: 41°1′32″N 75°36′16″W
- Country: United States
- State: Pennsylvania
- County: Carbon
- Township: Kidder

Area
  - Total: 2.39 sq mi (6.18 km^{2})
  - Land: 2.34 sq mi (6.07 km^{2})
  - Water: 0.042 sq mi (0.11 km^{2})
- Elevation: 1,651 ft (503 m)

Population (2020)
  - Total: 583
  - Density: 248.6/sq mi (95.98/km^{2})
- Time zone: UTC-5 (Eastern (EST))
  - Summer (DST): UTC-4 (EDT)
- ZIP code: 18210
- Area codes: 570 and 272
- FIPS code: 42-35172
- GNIS feature ID: 1212370

Holiday Pocono is a residential community and census-designated place (CDP) in Kidder Township, Pennsylvania, United States. It is part of Northeastern Pennsylvania.

The community is located on the north side of Pennsylvania Route 534, directly north of Albrightsville. There are two small water bodies in the CDP: Holiday Lake and Placid Lake. The western edge of the community abuts Hickory Run State Park.

Historical population
Census	Pop.	Note	%±
2020	583		—
U.S. Decennial Census

== Education ==
It is in the Jim Thorpe Area School District.
