= Tunkhannock Creek =

Tunkhannock Creek may refer to the following streams in the U.S. state of Pennsylvania:

- Tunkhannock Creek (Susquehanna River tributary)
- Tunkhannock Creek (Tobyhanna Creek)
