= Tunkhannock =

Tunkhannock may refer to the following places in Pennsylvania:

- Tunkhannock, Pennsylvania, a borough in Wyoming County
- Tunkhannock Creek (Susquehanna River)
- Tunkhannock Creek (Tobyhanna Creek)
- Tunkhannock Viaduct, a railroad bridge in Wyoming County
