= Pennsylvania Route 534 =

State highway in Pennsylvania, US

Pennsylvania Route 534

Route information
- Maintained by PennDOT
- Length: 23.535 mi (37.876 km)
- Existed: 1964–present

Major junctions
- West end: PA 940 in East Side
- I-80 in East Side; PA 903 in Kidder Township
- East end: US 209 in Polk Township

Location
- Country: United States
- State: Pennsylvania
- Counties: Carbon, Monroe

Highway system
- Pennsylvania State Route System; Interstate; US; State; Scenic; Legislative
← PA 533	→ PA 535

Pennsylvania Route 534 (PA 534) is an 23.5-mile-long (37.8 km) state highway located in Monroe and Carbon counties in Pennsylvania. The western terminus is at PA 940 in East Side. The eastern terminus is at U.S. Route 209 (US 209) in the community of Kresgeville in Polk Township. PA 534 runs northwest-southeast through forested areas of the Pocono Mountains as a two-lane undivided road. The route has an interchange with Interstate 80 (I-80) near East Side before it passes through Hickory Run State Park. PA 534 crosses PA 903 near Albrightsville and continues south to US 209. The roadway was paved in the 1930s and received the PA 534 designation in the 1960s.

== Route description ==
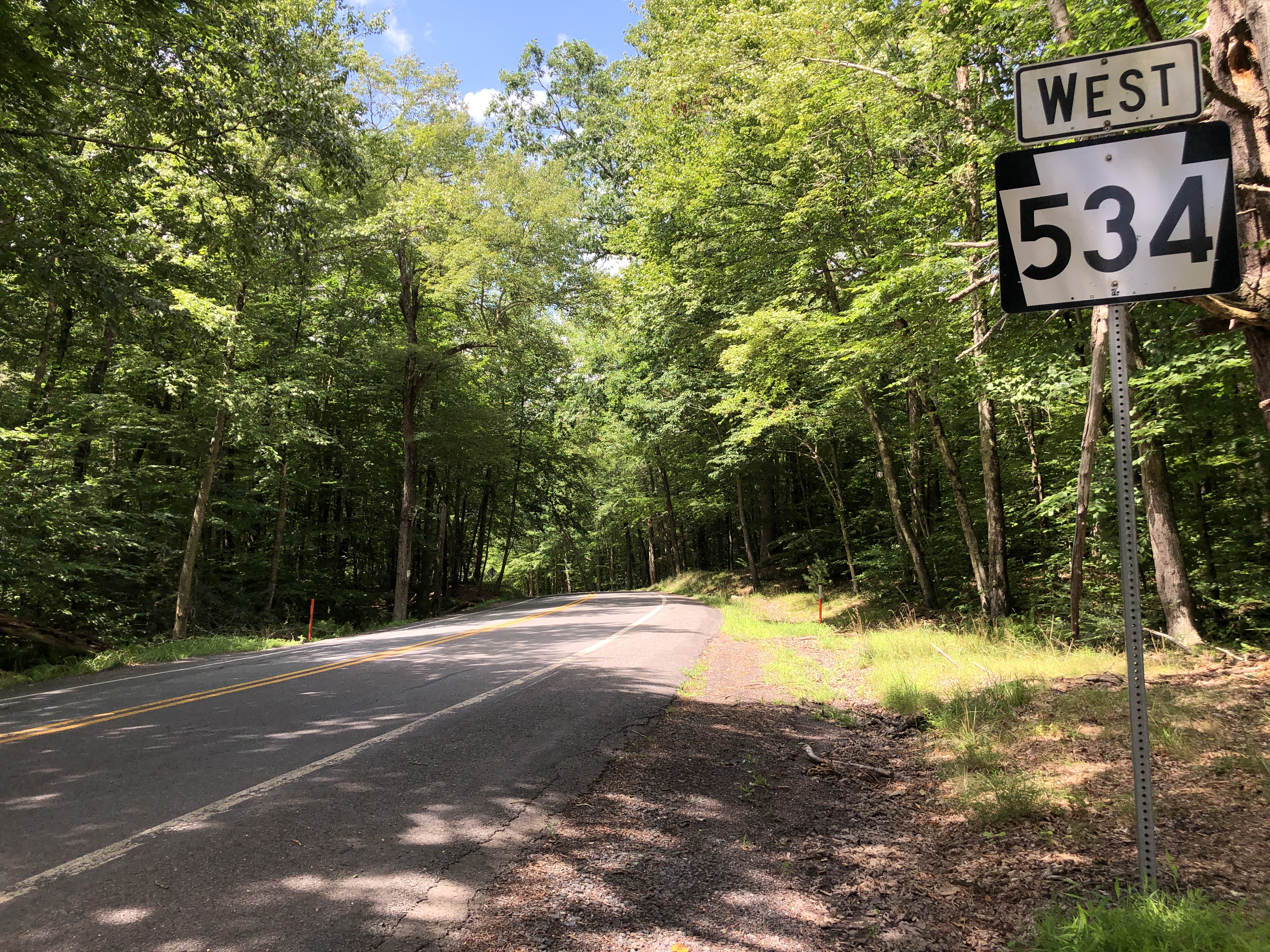
PA 534 through Hickory Run State Park

PA 534 begins at an intersection with PA 940 on the border of the borough of East Side and Kidder Township in Carbon County, heading south on a two-lane undivided road. The route forms the border between East Side to the west and Kidder Township to the east, heading through a mix of fields and woods with some businesses as it comes to an interchange with I-80. The road heads into forested areas and passes to the east of a golf course as it fully enters Kidder Township, curving to the southwest. PA 534 reaches the community of Lehigh Tannery, turning to the southeast before continuing east into dense forests. The road heads into Hickory Run State Park and turns southeast before curving northeast and passing through Hickory Run. The route runs east through more forested areas of the state park, heading east-southeast and passing under I-476 (Pennsylvania Turnpike Northeast Extension).

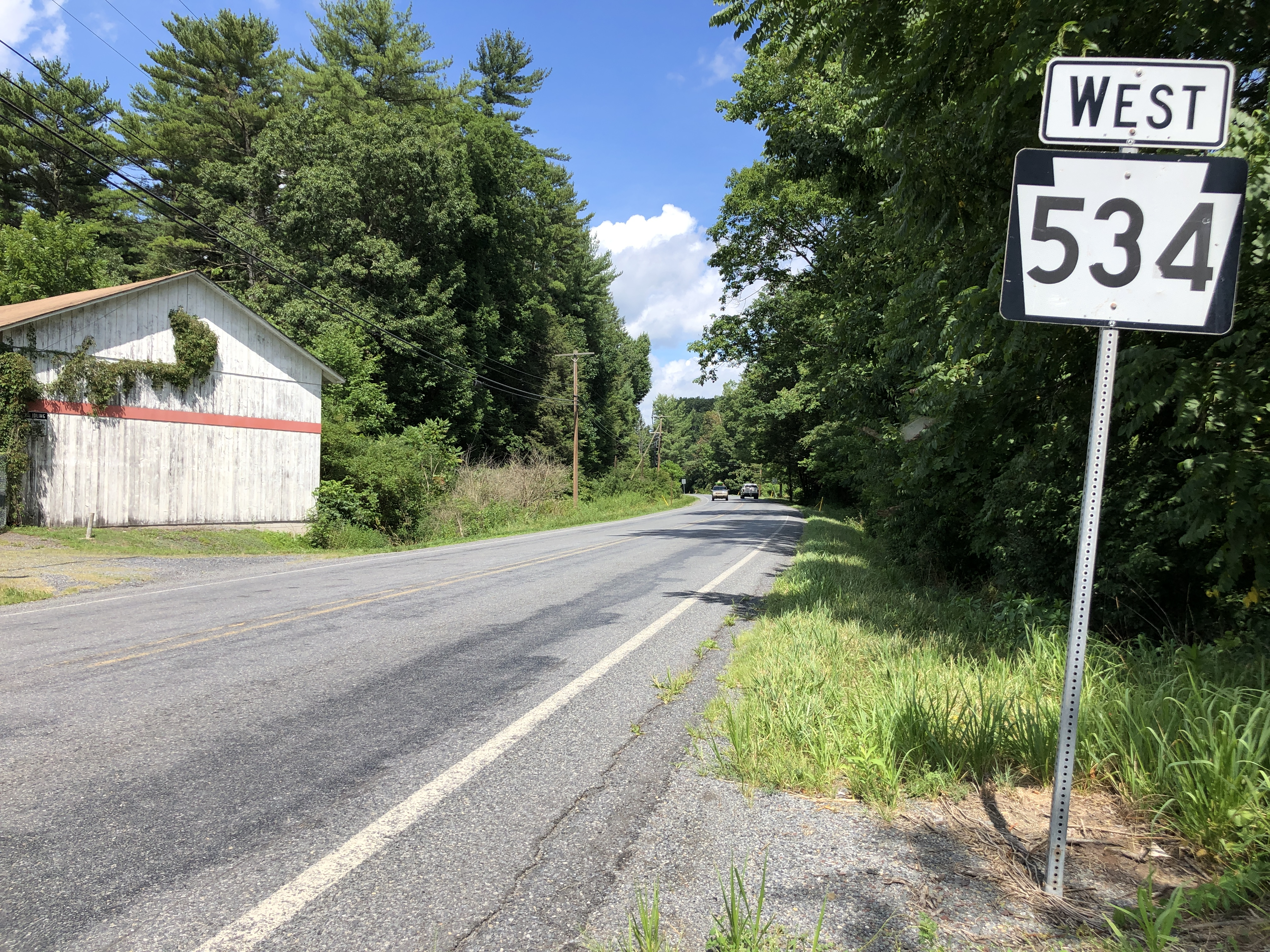
PA 534 westbound in Polk Township

PA 534 leaves Hickory Run State Park and heads through more wooded areas with some farm fields and homes, passing through Albrightsville before passing to the south of the residential development of Holiday Pocono and intersecting PA 903. A short distance later, the road crosses into Penn Forest Township and turns southeast, running through more woodland with some farmland and residences. The route passes to the southeast of a lake before running through Meckesville and the wooded residential development of Indian Mountain Lake before turning south.

PA 534 enters Polk Township in Monroe County and heads east near the wooded residential development of Pleasant Valley Estates before turning southeast and passing through Jonas. The road continues south through more farmland and woodland with homes, passing near the private development of Pleasant Valley Estates. Farther south, PA 534 comes to its eastern terminus at an intersection with US 209 in the community of Kresgeville.

== History ==
When Pennsylvania first legislated routes in 1911, what is now PA 534 was not given a number. By 1930, the highway between East Side and Kresgeville was an unnumbered, unpaved road. This stretch of road was paved during the 1930s. PA 534 was designated onto its current alignment between PA 940 in East Side and US 209 in Kresgeville in the 1960s, with an interchange at I-80 south of East Side.

== Major intersections ==
County	Location	mi	km	Destinations	Notes
Carbon	East Side–Kidder Township line	0.000	0.000	PA 940 (State Street) – White Haven, Blakeslee	Western terminus
Carbon	East Side–Kidder Township line	0.434	0.698	I-80 – Stroudsburg, Hazleton	Exit 274 (I-80)
Carbon	Kidder Township	12.469	20.067	PA 903 / US 209 Truck north – Lake Harmony, Jim Thorpe	Western terminus of US 209 Truck overlap
Monroe	Polk Township	23.535	37.876	US 209 – Stroudsburg, Lehighton US 209 Truck ends	Eastern terminus
1.000 mi = 1.609 km; 1.000 km = 0.621 mi: Concurrency terminus
