= Polk Township, Monroe County, Pennsylvania =

Township in Pennsylvania, US

Polk Township
- Township
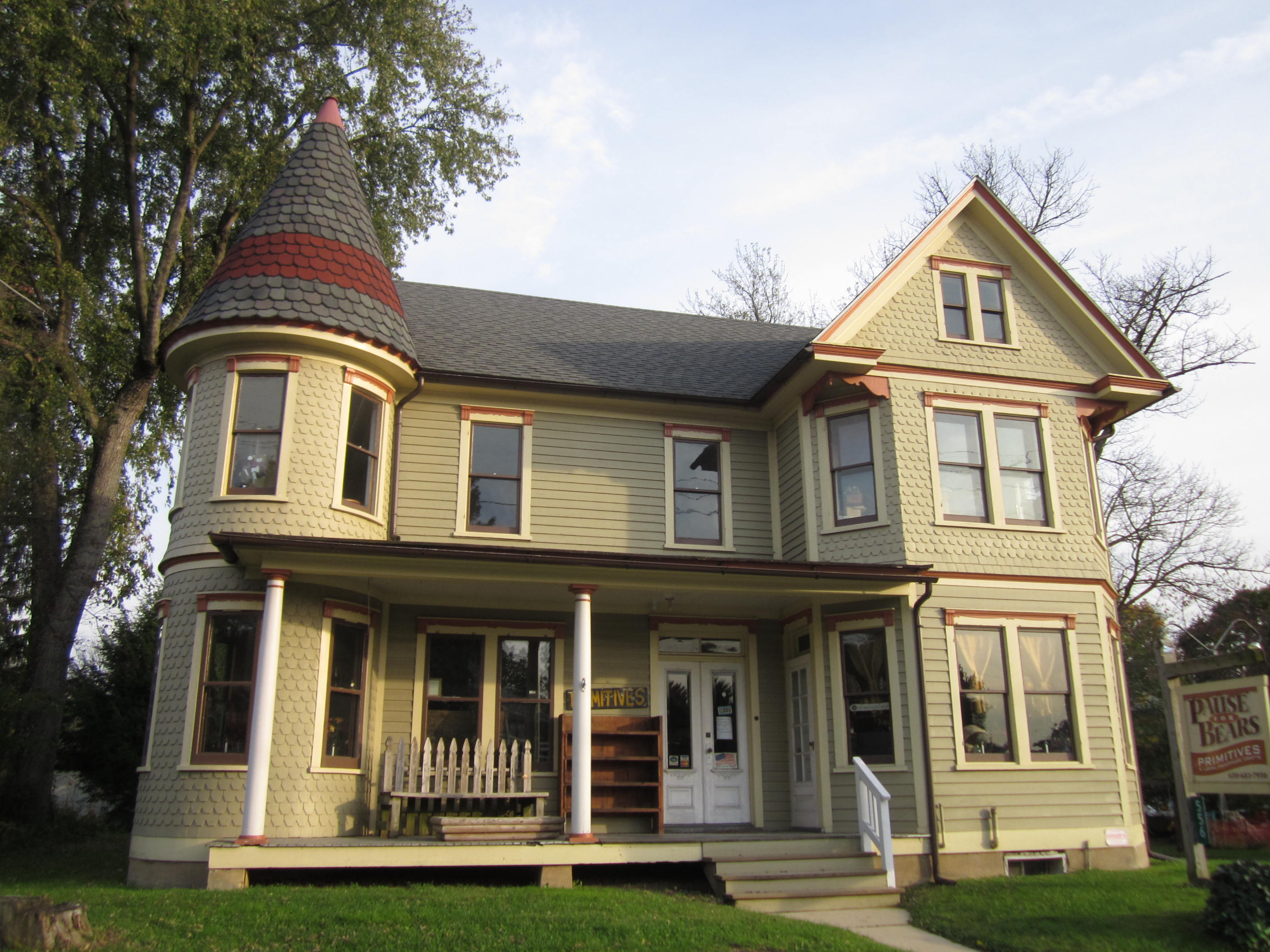
- House in Kresgeville

- Flag Seal

- Location of Pennsylvania in the United States
- Coordinates: 40°55′00″N 75°30′04″W
- Country: United States
- State: Pennsylvania
- County: Monroe
- Established: 1845

Area
  - Total: 31.18 sq mi (80.76 km^{2})
  - Land: 30.80 sq mi (79.76 km^{2})
  - Water: 0.39 sq mi (1.00 km^{2})
- Elevation: 902 ft (275 m)

Population (2020)
  - Total: 7,473
  - Density: 242.7/sq mi (93.69/km^{2})
- Time zone: UTC-5 (EST)
  - Summer (DST): UTC-4 (EDT)
- Area code(s): 570
- FIPS code: 42-089-61928
- Website: polktwp.org

Polk Township is a township in Monroe County, Pennsylvania, United States. The population was 7,473 at the 2020 census.

== Geography ==
According to the United States Census Bureau, the township has a total area of 31.4 square miles (81.4 km^{2}), of which 31.0 square miles (80.4 km^{2}) is land and 0.4 square mile (1.1 km^{2}) (1.30%) is water. It is drained by the Pohopoco Creek, which flows westward into the Lehigh River. Pohopoco Mountain forms its natural northern boundary. Its villages include Dottersville, Gilbert (also in Chestnuthill Township), Jonas, and Kresgeville.

=== Neighboring municipalities ===
- Tunkhannock Township (tangent to the northeast)
- Chestnuthill Township (east)
- Ross Township (tangent to the southeast)
- Eldred Township (south)
- Towamensing Township, Carbon County (west)
- Penn Forest Township, Carbon County (northwest and north)

== Demographics ==
Historical population
Census	Pop.	Note	%±
1930	876		—
1940	874		−0.2%
1950	712		−18.5%
1960	1,070		50.3%
1970	1,284		20.0%
1980	3,265		154.3%
1990	4,517		38.3%
2000	6,533		44.6%
2010	7,874		20.5%
2020	7,473		−5.1%

As of the census of 2000, there were 6,533 people, 2,301 households, and 1,808 families residing in the township. The population density was 210.5 inhabitants per square mile (81.3/km^{2}). There were 2,824 housing units at an average density of 91.0 per square mile (35.1/km^{2}). The racial makeup of the township was 96.37% White, 1.84% African American, 0.20% Native American, 0.57% Asian, 0.32% from other races, and 0.70% from two or more races. Hispanic or Latino of any race were 3.37% of the population.

There were 2,301 households, out of which 37.8% had children under the age of 18 living with them, 66.2% were married couples living together, 7.8% had a female householder with no husband present, and 21.4% were non-families. 16.8% of all households were made up of individuals, and 7.6% had someone living alone who was 65 years of age or older. The average household size was 2.81 and the average family size was 3.16.

In the township the population was spread out, with 27.5% under the age of 18, 6.4% from 18 to 24, 29.2% from 25 to 44, 22.8% from 45 to 64, and 14.0% who were 65 years of age or older. The median age was 38 years. For every 100 females, there were 96.8 males. For every 100 females age 18 and over, there were 96.5 males.

The median income for a household in the township was $45,016, and the median income for a family was $46,250. Males had a median income of $36,467 versus $25,017 for females. The per capita income for the township was $20,090. About 5.3% of families and 6.9% of the population were below the poverty line, including 6.3% of those under age 18 and 7.7% of those age 65 or over.

United States presidential election results for Polk Township, Monroe County, Pennsylvania
Year	Republican		Democratic		Third party(ies)	
Year	No.	%	No.	%	No.	%
2024	2,950	67.34%	1,396	31.86%	35	0.80%
2020	2,579	64.88%	1,325	33.33%	71	1.79%
2016	2,164	65.66%	1,010	30.64%	122	3.70%
2012	1,470	52.80%	1,273	45.73%	41	1.47%
2008	1,449	48.74%	1,483	49.88%	41	1.38%
2004	1,372	56.14%	1,055	43.17%	17	0.70%
2000	1,146	53.25%	914	42.47%	92	4.28%

== Climate ==
According to the Trewartha climate classification system, Polk Township has a Temperate continental climate (Dc) with warm summers (b), cold winters (o) and year-around precipitation (Dcbo). Dcbo climates are characterized by at least one month having an average mean temperature ≤ 32.0 °F (0 °C), four to seven months with an average mean temperature ≥ 50.0 °F (10 °C), all months with an average mean temperature < 72.0 °F (22 °C) and no significant precipitation difference between seasons. Although most summer days are slightly humid in Polk Township, episodes of heat and high humidity can occur, with heat index values > 99 °F (37 °C). Since 1981, the highest air temperature was 96.7 °F (36 °C) on July 22, 2011, and the highest daily average mean dew point was 72.2 °F (22 °C) on August 1, 2006. July is the peak month for thunderstorm activity, which correlates with the average warmest month of the year. The average wettest month is September, which correlates with tropical storm remnants during the peak of the Atlantic hurricane season. Since 1981, the wettest calendar day was 5.87 inches (149 mm) on September 30, 2010. During the winter months, the plant hardiness zone is 6a, with an average annual extreme minimum air temperature of −8.0 °F (−22 °C). Since 1981, the coldest air temperature was −20.7 °F (−29 °C) on January 21, 1994. Episodes of extreme cold and wind can occur with wind chill values < −20 °F (−29 °C). The average snowiest month is January, which correlates with the average coldest month of the year. Ice storms and large snowstorms depositing ≥ 12 inches (30 cm) of snow occur once every couple of years, particularly during nor'easters from December through March.

Climate data for Polk Twp, Elevation 928 ft (283 m), 1981-2010 normals, extremes 1981-2018
Month	Jan	Feb	Mar	Apr	May	Jun	Jul	Aug	Sep	Oct	Nov	Dec	Year
Record high °F (°C)	66.4 (19.1)	76.1 (24.5)	84.4 (29.1)	90.8 (32.7)	92.9 (33.8)	92.8 (33.8)	99.0 (37.2)	96.6 (35.9)	94.0 (34.4)	86.7 (30.4)	77.2 (25.1)	69.7 (20.9)	99.0 (37.2)
Mean daily maximum °F (°C)	34.8 (1.6)	38.1 (3.4)	46.6 (8.1)	59.1 (15.1)	70.1 (21.2)	78.0 (25.6)	82.3 (27.9)	80.6 (27.0)	73.8 (23.2)	62.0 (16.7)	50.5 (10.3)	38.9 (3.8)	59.7 (15.4)
Daily mean °F (°C)	26.0 (−3.3)	28.6 (−1.9)	36.3 (2.4)	47.5 (8.6)	58.0 (14.4)	66.5 (19.2)	70.9 (21.6)	69.3 (20.7)	62.2 (16.8)	50.5 (10.3)	40.9 (4.9)	30.5 (−0.8)	49.0 (9.4)
Mean daily minimum °F (°C)	17.3 (−8.2)	19.0 (−7.2)	26.0 (−3.3)	35.8 (2.1)	46.0 (7.8)	55.0 (12.8)	59.5 (15.3)	57.9 (14.4)	50.6 (10.3)	38.9 (3.8)	31.3 (−0.4)	22.2 (−5.4)	38.4 (3.6)
Record low °F (°C)	−20.7 (−29.3)	−9.6 (−23.1)	−1.8 (−18.8)	13.1 (−10.5)	28.3 (−2.1)	34.8 (1.6)	40.8 (4.9)	36.5 (2.5)	29.7 (−1.3)	18.2 (−7.7)	3.7 (−15.7)	−8.3 (−22.4)	−20.7 (−29.3)
Average precipitation inches (mm)	3.51 (89)	3.00 (76)	3.85 (98)	4.13 (105)	4.29 (109)	4.87 (124)	4.72 (120)	4.18 (106)	5.05 (128)	4.62 (117)	3.97 (101)	4.17 (106)	50.36 (1,279)
Average snowfall inches (cm)	14.1 (36)	10.1 (26)	10.5 (27)	2.5 (6.4)	0.0 (0.0)	0.0 (0.0)	0.0 (0.0)	0.0 (0.0)	0.0 (0.0)	0.1 (0.25)	2.7 (6.9)	8.5 (22)	48.6 (123)
Average relative humidity (%)	71.3	66.9	62.2	59.5	63.1	71.2	70.9	74.1	74.5	71.4	70.9	72.8	69.1
Average dew point °F (°C)	18.0 (−7.8)	19.0 (−7.2)	24.6 (−4.1)	34.1 (1.2)	45.5 (7.5)	56.9 (13.8)	61.0 (16.1)	60.7 (15.9)	54.0 (12.2)	41.6 (5.3)	32.2 (0.1)	22.8 (−5.1)	39.3 (4.1)
Source: PRISM

== Transportation ==
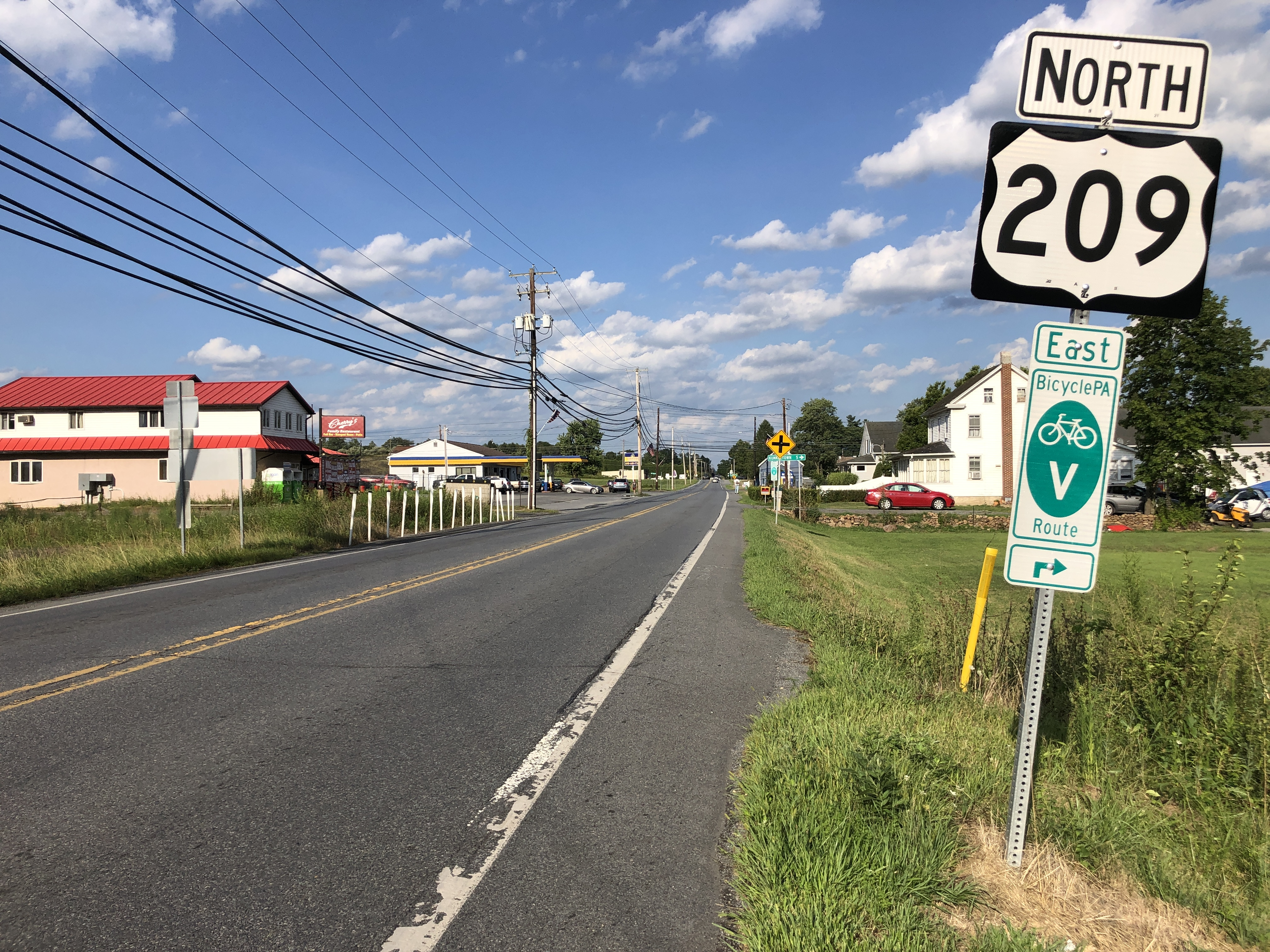
US 209 northbound in Polk Township

As of 2020, there were 81.72 miles (131.52 km) of public roads in Polk Township, of which 20.54 miles (33.06 km) were maintained by the Pennsylvania Department of Transportation (PennDOT) and 61.18 miles (98.46 km) were maintained by the township.

U.S. Route 209 and Pennsylvania Route 534 are the numbered highways serving Polk Township. US 209 follows Interchange Road along a southwest-northeast alignment across the southern portion of the township. PA 534 starts at US 209 and follows Scenic Drive northwestward through the center of the township.

== Ecology ==
According to the A. W. Kuchler U.S. potential natural vegetation types, Polk Township would have a dominant vegetation type of Appalachian Oak (104) with a dominant vegetation form of Eastern Hardwood Forest (25). The peak spring bloom typically occurs in late-April and peak fall color usually occurs in mid-October. The plant hardiness zone is 6a with an average annual extreme minimum air temperature of −8.0 °F (−22 °C).
