= Carbon County, Pennsylvania =

County in Pennsylvania, United States

- County
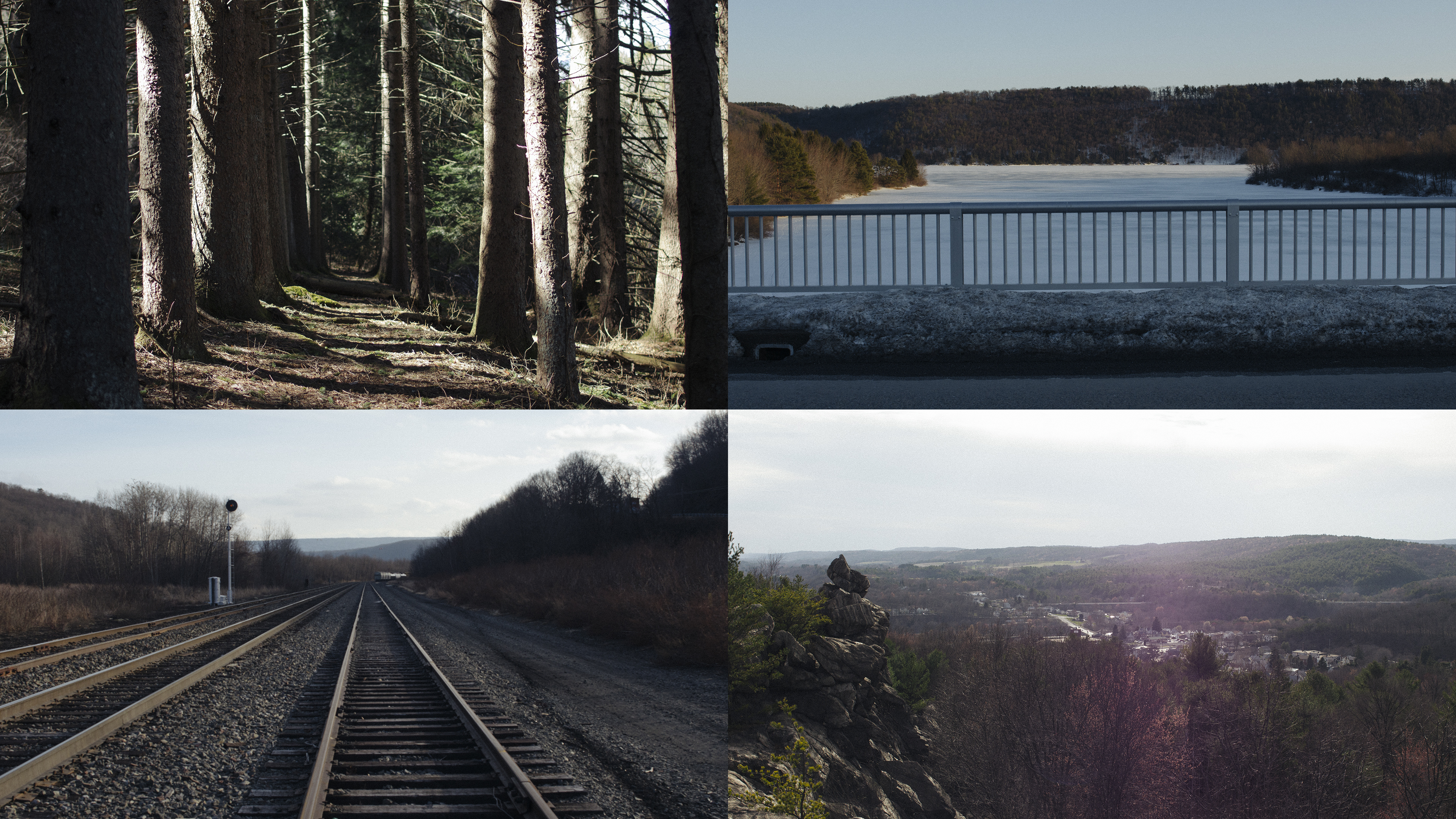
- Clockwise from top left: Beltzville State Park, Beltzville Lake, Bowmanstown, and Packerton

- Flag Seal

- Location within the U.S. state of Pennsylvania
- Coordinates: 40°55′N 75°42′W
- Country: United States
- State: Pennsylvania
- Founded: March 13, 1843 (Divided from Northampton County)
- Named for: Coal deposits
- Seat: Jim Thorpe
- Largest borough: Palmerton

Area
  - Total: 387 sq mi (1,000 km^{2})
  - Land: 381 sq mi (990 km^{2})
  - Water: 5.9 sq mi (15 km^{2}) 2%

Population (2020)
  - Total: 64,749
  - Estimate (2025): 65,868 ▲
  - Density: 170/sq mi (66/km^{2})
- Time zone: UTC−5 (Eastern)
  - Summer (DST): UTC−4 (EDT)
- Congressional district: 7th
- Website: www.carboncountypa.gov

Pennsylvania Historical Marker
- Designated: June 13, 1982

Carbon County is a county in the Commonwealth of Pennsylvania, United States. As of the 2020 census, the population was 64,749. The county is part of the Northeast region of the commonwealth. (Note: Includes Luzerne, Lackawanna, Monroe, Schuylkill, Carbon, Pike, Bradford, Wayne, Susquehanna, Wyoming and Sullivan Counties)

The county borders Lehigh and Northampton counties in the state's Lehigh Valley region to its south, Monroe County to its east, Luzerne County to its north, and Schuylkill County to its west. The county is approximately 33 miles (53 km) northwest of Allentown, the state's third-largest city, and 117 miles (188 km) west of New York City, the nation's largest city.

The county seat is Jim Thorpe, which was founded in 1818 as Mauch Chunk. The Lehigh River, a 109-mile-long (175 km) tributary of the Delaware River, flows through Carbon County.

== History ==
=== Moravian settlement ===
In 1745, the first colonial settlement in Carbon County was established by a Moravian mission in Gnadenhutten, in present-day Lehighton. By 1752, increased hostility between colonialists and Indians put Gnadenhutten at risk for attack; in 1755, the community was attacked by Indians.

In the late 1780s, the county's settlement at Lehigh Gap failed, and colonizers did not return for a decade, in the late 1780s.

=== Coal ===
In 1791, a homesteader, Phillip Ginter, hunting on Sharp Mountain along Pisgah Mountain discovered a black tone coal outcropping, and conveyed a chunk of it to Weissport.

=== Industrialization ===
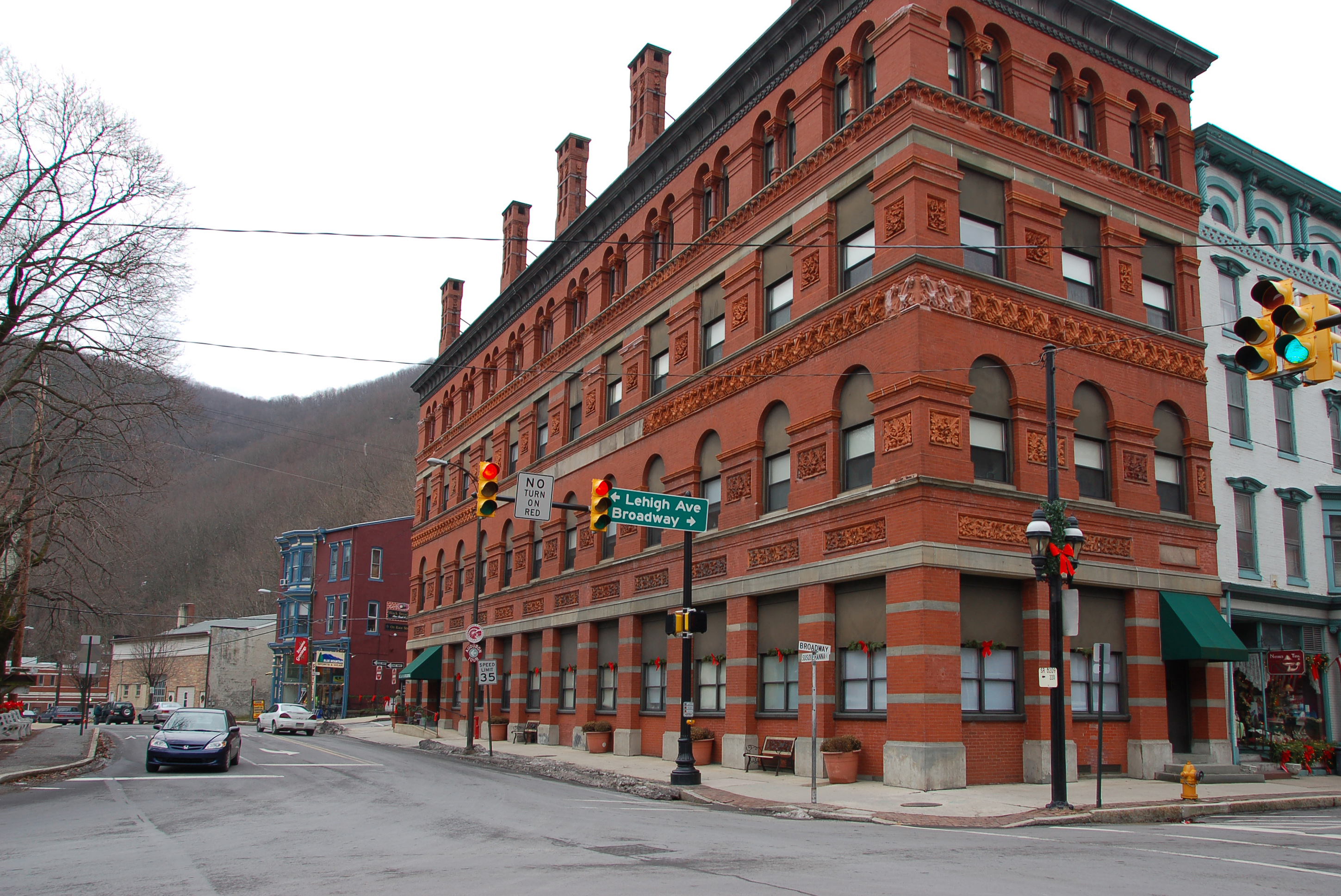
Corporate headquarters of Lehigh Coal & Navigation Company in Mauch Chunk, now Jim Thorpe; the company, which was founded in 1822 and dissolved in 1985, spearheaded the American Industrial Revolution

Lehigh Coal Mine Company (LCMC) operations had managed to open up the mouth area of the Nesquehoning Creek by 1800. This area became known as Lausanne, or Lausanne Landing, after the inn and tavern built there called Landing Tavern. An Indian trail crossed the stream near the confluence with Jean's Run and the camp grounds of their boat builders, climbing northwestwards along a traverse to the next water gap west, eroded into the southern flank of Broad Mountain in the Lehigh Valley. It connected across a barrier ridge whose waters originated in the saddle-pass where Hazleton was built. The trail became the Lehigh and Susquehanna Turnpike in 1804. PA Route 93 follows this route with the exception of where modern road building capabilities allowed improved positioning. This road cut 90–100 miles (140–160 km) off a trip from Philadelphia to the Wyoming Valley and the northern sections of the Coal Region.

=== Lehigh Coal & Navigation Company ===
In 1827, Lehigh Coal & Navigation Company, based in present-day Jim Thorpe, launched the Mauch Chunk Switchback Railway, the nation's second operating railroad. The Beaver Meadow Railroad and Coal Company, also located in Carbon County, was the first railway to operate steam locomotives as traction engines and prime movers in the United States. The Mauch Chunk Switchback Railway connected mines west of Beaver Meadows and Weatherly to the Lehigh Canal opposite Lehighton.

=== County's founding ===
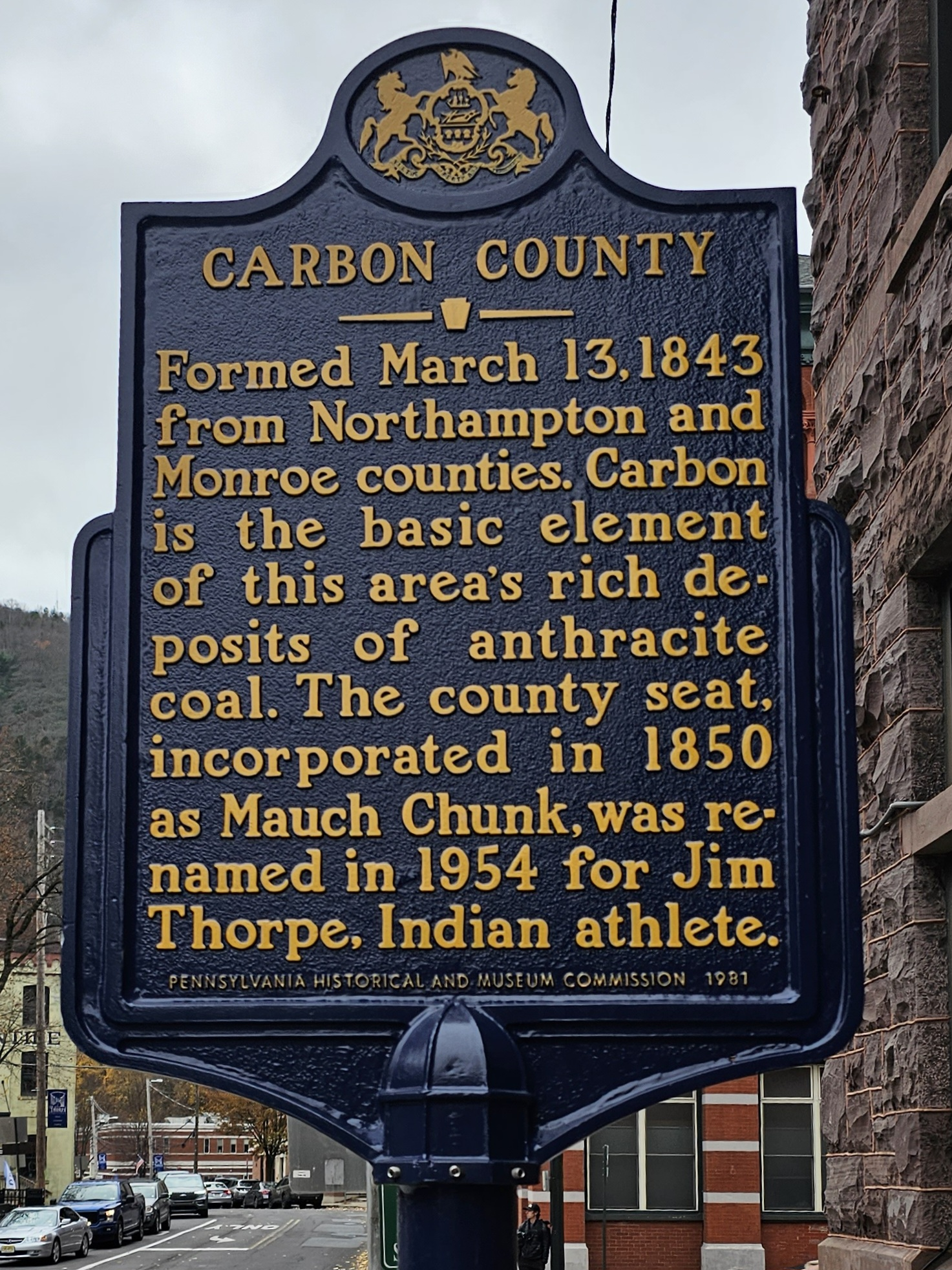
A state historical marker in Jim Thorpe

Carbon County was created on March 13, 1843, from parts of Northampton and Monroe counties and was named for the extensive deposits of anthracite coal in the region, where it was first discovered in 1791. Early attempts were made to exploit the deposits by Lehigh Coal Mine Company (1792), whose expeditions broke trail and pioneered river bank sites using mule powered technology to log, saw, and build arks to carry bags of coal to Philadelphia with only scant success.

=== Molly Maguires ===
In the 19th century, Carbon County was the location of trials and executions of the Molly Maguires, an Irish secret society that terrorized the region, attacking officials, police officers, and industrial equipment.

== Geography ==
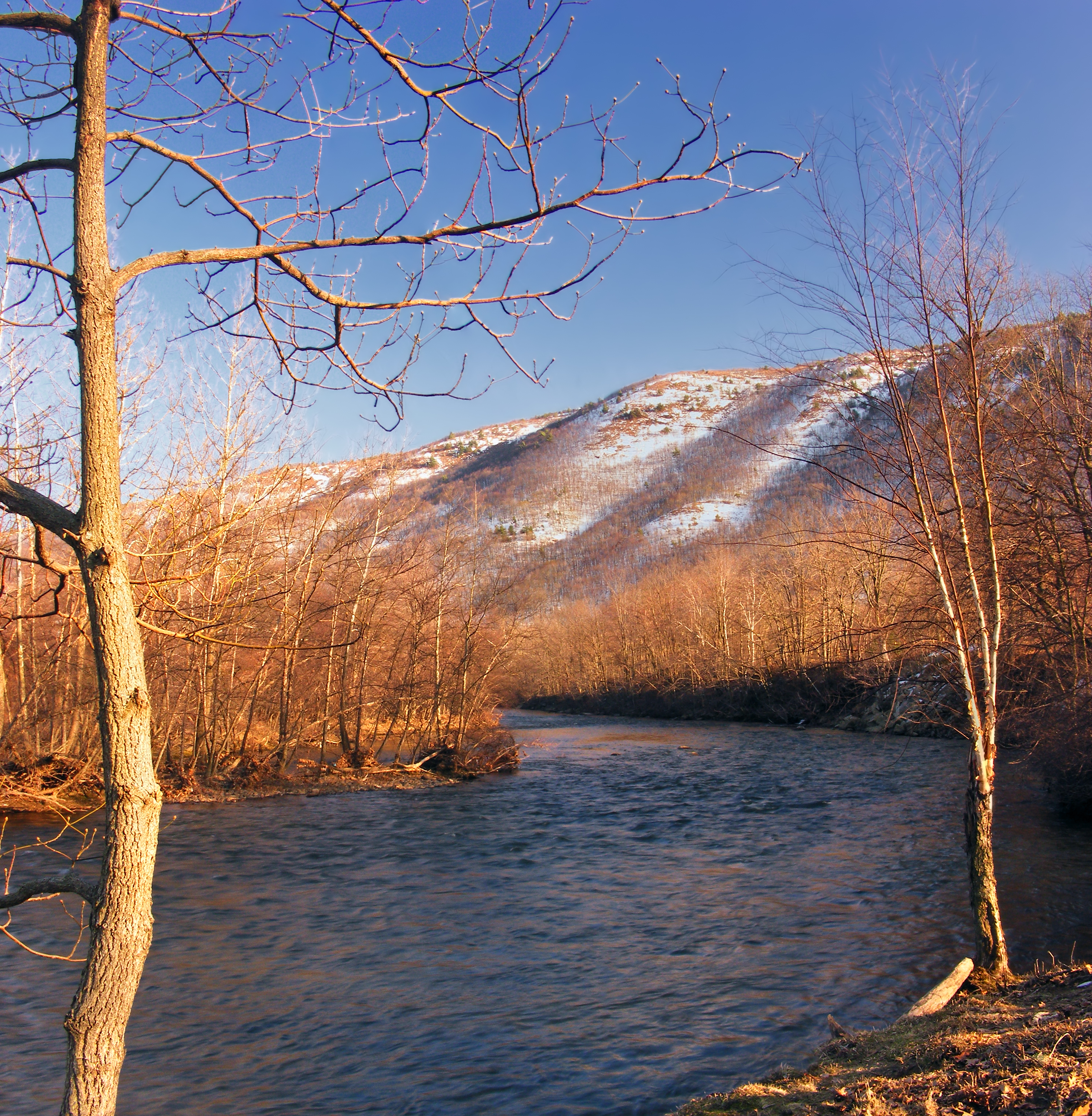
The Lehigh River flowing through Riverview Park in Palmerton in March 2010

According to the U.S. Census Bureau, the county has a total area of 387 square miles (1,000 km^{2}), of which 381 square miles (990 km^{2}) is land and 5.9 square miles (15 km^{2}) (1.5%) is water. Blue Mountain forms the southern boundary of Carbon County. The northeast area of the county is located in the Pocono Mountains and the northwest area includes portions of Broad and Spring mountains.

The county is drained by the Lehigh River except for a small area in western Packer Township and the borough of Lansford that are drained by the Still Creek and Panther Creek, respectively, into the Little Schuylkill River and the Schuylkill River, and the Audenried area in the northwest corner that drains into the Susquehanna River via the Catawissa Creek. The Lehigh River cuts a gorge between Jim Thorpe and White Haven, which hosts the Lehigh Gorge State Park.

=== Climate ===
Carbon County has a humid continental climate (Dfa/Dfb) and is mostly in hardiness zone 6b except for the NE part of the county and higher NW areas where it is 6a. Average monthly temperatures at Jake Arner Memorial Airport range from 27.8 °F in January to 72.5 °F in July, while at the Pocono interchange of the Turnpike they range from 22.9 °F in January to 68.3 °F in July.

=== Adjacent counties ===
- Luzerne County (north)
- Monroe County (east)
- Northampton County (southeast)
- Lehigh County (south)
- Schuylkill County (southwest)

== Transportation ==
=== Major highways ===
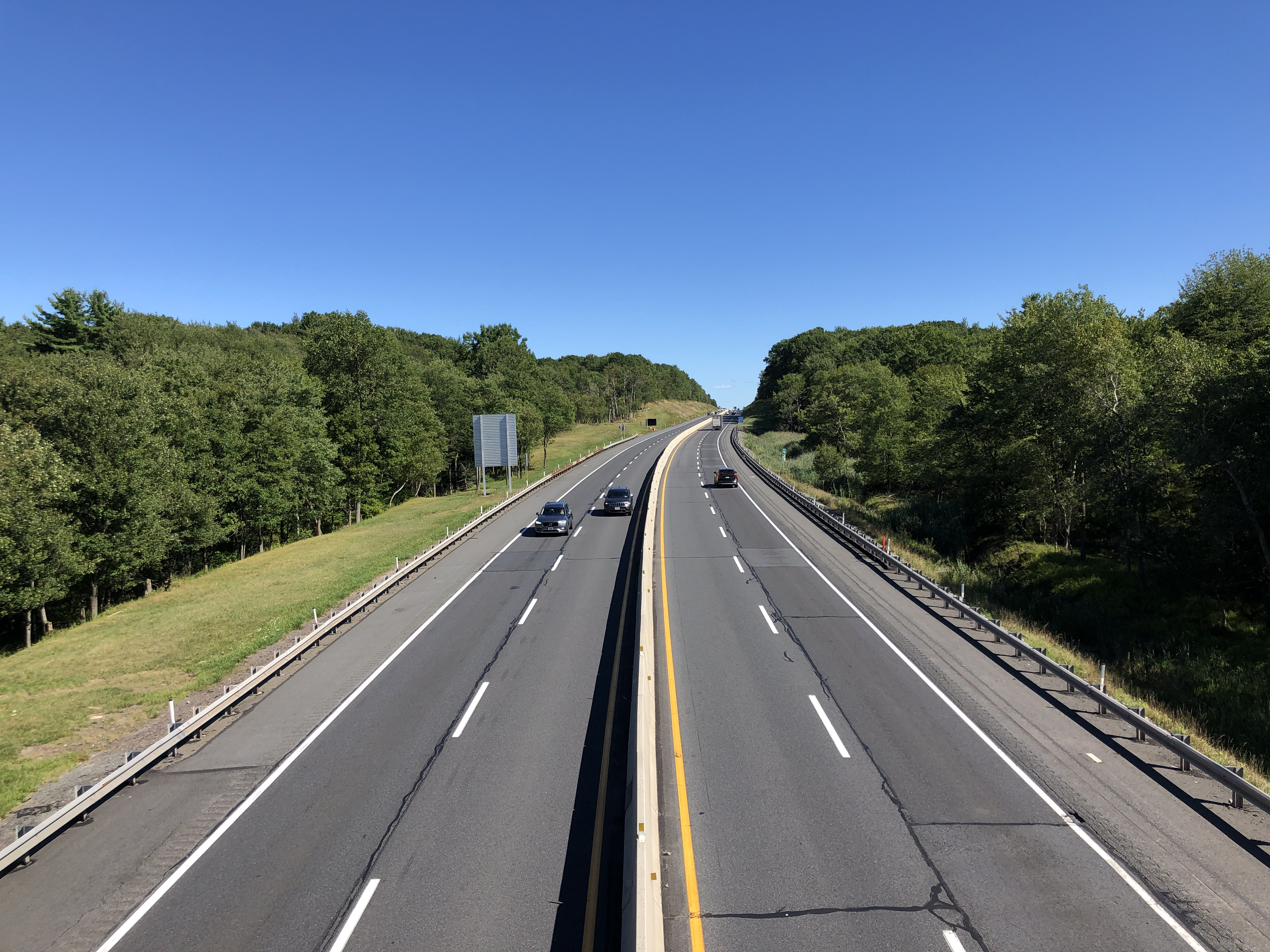
I-476/Pennsylvania Turnpike Northeast Extension southbound in Carbon County

- I-80
- I-476 / Penna Turnpike NE Extension
- US 209
- PA 54
- PA 93
- PA 248
- PA 309
- PA 443
- PA 534
- PA 895
- PA 902
- PA 903
- PA 940

=== Buses ===
Carbon Transit fixed-route bus service consists of Route 701 (Coaldale-Palmerton) and Route 702 (Nesquehoning-Palmerton), both connecting to the LANta Route 325 bus in Palmerton. Carbon Transit also operates CT Flex service in Jim Thorpe, Penn Forest Township, and Kidder Township. Also, Hazleton Public Transit (HPT) bus route 30 serves northwestern Carbon County via Beaver Meadows and Junedale to Weatherly. Audenried is served by HPT route 20 (Hazleton-McAdoo/Kelayres).

Fullington Trailways provides intercity service to Carbon County with stops in Lehighton and Jim Thorpe. Martz Trailways has a stop in Kidder Township near the Pocono interchange of Interstate 476 for service between Scranton, Wilkes-Barre, Allentown, Quakertown, and Philadelphia. This is an Amtrak Thruway route, connecting to Amtrak trains at 30th Street Station in Philadelphia. Martz also operates casino bus routes to Atlantic City from the stop.

=== Airports ===
Jake Arner Memorial Airport in Lehighton provides general aviation. The nearest commercial passenger service is at Lehigh Valley International Airport or Wilkes-Barre/Scranton International Airport.

== Demographics ==
Historical population
Census	Pop.	Note	%±
1850	15,686		—
1860	21,033		34.1%
1870	28,144		33.8%
1880	31,923		13.4%
1890	38,624		21.0%
1900	44,510		15.2%
1910	52,846		18.7%
1920	62,565		18.4%
1930	63,380		1.3%
1940	61,735		−2.6%
1950	57,558		−6.8%
1960	52,889		−8.1%
1970	50,573		−4.4%
1980	53,285		5.4%
1990	56,846		6.7%
2000	58,802		3.4%
2010	65,249		11.0%
2020	64,749		−0.8%
2025 (est.)	65,868	▲	1.7%
U.S. Decennial Census; 1790-1960 1900-1990; 1990-2000 2010-2017

=== Racial and ethnic composition ===
Carbon County, Pennsylvania – Racial and ethnic composition Note: the US Census treats Hispanic/Latino as an ethnic category. This table excludes Latinos from the racial categories and assigns them to a separate category. Hispanics/Latinos may be of any race.
Race / Ethnicity (NH = Non-Hispanic)	Pop 1980	Pop 1990	Pop 2000	Pop 2010	Pop 2020	% 1980	% 1990	% 2000	% 2010	% 2020
White alone (NH)	52,773	55,991	56,952	61,168	57,439	99.04%	98.50%	96.85%	93.75%	88.71%
Black or African American alone (NH)	29	113	333	888	1,070	0.05%	0.20%	0.57%	1.36%	1.65%
Native American or Alaska Native alone (NH)	12	44	83	100	95	0.02%	0.08%	0.14%	0.15%	0.15%
Asian alone (NH)	107	167	183	304	327	0.20%	0.29%	0.31%	0.47%	0.51%
Native Hawaiian or Pacific Islander alone (NH)	x	x	17	24	14	x	x	0.03%	0.04%	0.02%
Other race alone (NH)	33	22	17	36	216	0.06%	0.04%	0.03%	0.06%	0.33%
Mixed race or Multiracial (NH)	x	x	359	584	1,946	x	x	0.61%	0.90%	3.01%
Hispanic or Latino (any race)	331	509	858	2,145	3,642	0.62%	0.90%	1.46%	3.29%	5.62%
Total	53,285	56,846	58,802	65,249	64,749	100.00%	100.00%	100.00%	100.00%	100.00%

=== 2020 census ===
As of the 2020 census, the county had a population of 64,749. The median age was 46.7 years. 19.2% of residents were under the age of 18 and 21.9% of residents were 65 years of age or older. For every 100 females there were 97.9 males, and for every 100 females age 18 and over there were 96.5 males age 18 and over.

The racial makeup of the county was 90.4% White, 1.9% Black or African American, 0.2% American Indian and Alaska Native, 0.5% Asian, <0.1% Native Hawaiian and Pacific Islander, 2.1% from some other race, and 4.9% from two or more races. Hispanic or Latino residents of any race comprised 5.6% of the population.

41.1% of residents lived in urban areas, while 58.9% lived in rural areas.

There were 26,850 households in the county, of which 25.7% had children under the age of 18 living in them. Of all households, 47.2% were married-couple households, 19.6% were households with a male householder and no spouse or partner present, and 24.5% were households with a female householder and no spouse or partner present. About 28.2% of all households were made up of individuals and 13.4% had someone living alone who was 65 years of age or older.

There were 34,152 housing units, of which 21.4% were vacant. Among occupied housing units, 75.4% were owner-occupied and 24.6% were renter-occupied. The homeowner vacancy rate was 2.1% and the rental vacancy rate was 11.8%.

=== 2000 census ===
As of the 2000 census, there were 58,802 people, 23,701 households, and 16,424 families residing in the county. The population density was 154 people per square mile (59 people/km^{2}). There were 30,492 housing units at an average density of 80 units per square mile (31/km^{2}). The racial makeup of the county was 97.82% White, 0.60% Black or African American, 0.16% Native American, 0.31% Asian, 0.03% Pacific Islander, 0.32% from other races, and 0.76% from two or more races. 1.46% of the population were Hispanic or Latino of any race. 29.4% were of German, 10.1% Irish, 9.2% Italian, 7.9% American, 6.6% Slovak, 6.0% Polish and 5.8% Ukrainian ancestry.

There were 23,701 households, out of which 28.70% had children under the age of 18 living with them, 54.80% were married couples living together, 9.90% had a female householder with no husband present, and 30.70% were non-families. 26.00% of all households were made up of individuals, and 13.50% had someone living alone who was 65 years of age or older. The average household size was 2.44 and the average family size was 2.93.

In the county, the population was spread out, with 22.20% under the age of 18, 6.90% from 18 to 24, 28.30% from 25 to 44, 24.20% from 45 to 64, and 18.50% who were 65 years of age or older. The median age was 41 years. For every 100 females there were 94.90 males. For every 100 females age 18 and over, there were 92.30 males.

== Law and government ==
United States presidential election results for Carbon County, Pennsylvania
Year	Republican		Democratic		Third party(ies)	
Year	No.	%	No.	%	No.	%
1888	3,279	45.69%	3,665	51.07%	233	3.25%
1892	3,179	45.68%	3,541	50.88%	239	3.43%
1896	4,534	53.93%	3,609	42.93%	264	3.14%
1900	4,222	48.81%	4,149	47.97%	278	3.21%
1904	4,505	53.93%	2,998	35.89%	850	10.18%
1908	4,486	49.23%	3,890	42.69%	737	8.09%
1912	1,246	13.95%	3,652	40.88%	4,036	45.18%
1916	4,275	49.18%	4,099	47.15%	319	3.67%
1920	7,900	59.19%	5,030	37.69%	416	3.12%
1924	10,236	55.55%	5,150	27.95%	3,041	16.50%
1928	15,047	64.98%	8,010	34.59%	98	0.42%
1932	9,918	48.52%	9,874	48.30%	649	3.17%
1936	11,298	43.77%	14,179	54.93%	334	1.29%
1940	10,618	45.27%	12,777	54.47%	60	0.26%
1944	9,837	46.91%	11,060	52.74%	73	0.35%
1948	9,744	49.77%	9,438	48.21%	396	2.02%
1952	12,283	53.43%	10,571	45.98%	134	0.58%
1956	13,150	57.27%	9,722	42.34%	89	0.39%
1960	12,586	50.28%	12,391	49.50%	55	0.22%
1964	7,309	32.00%	15,416	67.49%	116	0.51%
1968	9,954	46.13%	10,634	49.28%	991	4.59%
1972	11,639	59.05%	7,774	39.44%	299	1.52%
1976	8,883	44.48%	10,791	54.03%	299	1.50%
1980	10,042	51.95%	8,009	41.44%	1,278	6.61%
1984	10,701	54.41%	8,836	44.93%	131	0.67%
1988	10,232	52.35%	9,104	46.57%	211	1.08%
1992	7,243	33.44%	9,072	41.89%	5,344	24.67%
1996	7,193	36.28%	9,457	47.69%	3,179	16.03%
2000	9,717	45.67%	10,668	50.14%	892	4.19%
2004	12,519	49.99%	12,223	48.81%	301	1.20%
2008	12,957	47.90%	13,464	49.77%	629	2.33%
2012	13,504	52.56%	11,580	45.07%	610	2.37%
2016	18,743	64.65%	8,936	30.82%	1,314	4.53%
2020	21,984	65.26%	11,212	33.28%	493	1.46%
2024	23,708	66.90%	11,394	32.15%	334	0.94%

United States Senate election results for Carbon County, Pennsylvania1
Year	Republican		Democratic		Third party(ies)	
Year	No.	%	No.	%	No.	%
1994	7,402	48.97%	7,260	48.03%	453	3.00%
2000	10,598	53.18%	8,878	44.55%	453	2.27%
2006	7,439	42.66%	9,997	57.34%	0	0.00%
2012	12,758	50.48%	11,924	47.18%	589	2.33%
2018	13,519	59.89%	8,739	38.71%	316	1.40%
2024	22,603	64.45%	11,570	32.99%	898	2.56%

United States Senate election results for Carbon County, Pennsylvania3
Year	Republican		Democratic		Third party(ies)	
Year	No.	%	No.	%	No.	%
1992	9,500	45.88%	10,571	51.06%	6,34	3.06%
1998	7,353	55.75%	5,218	39.56%	618	4.69%
2004	13,514	56.17%	9,579	39.82%	965	4.01%
2010	10,326	54.68%	8,559	45.32%	0	0.00%
2016	16,360	57.98%	10,086	35.75%	1,770	6.27%
2022	15,659	59.69%	9,682	36.91%	891	3.40%

Pennsylvania Gubernatorial election results for Carbon County
Year	Republican		Democratic		Third party(ies)	
Year	No.	%	No.	%	No.	%
1970	7,797	41.78%	10,475	56.12%	392	2.10%
1974	7,408	44.45%	9,038	54.23%	219	1.31%
1978	8,862	54.69%	7,180	44.31%	163	1.01%
1982	7,107	41.64%	9,816	57.52%	143	0.84%
1986	6,617	42.42%	8,839	56.66%	144	0.92%
1990	4,169	29.90%	9,773	70.10%	0	0.00%
1994	7,533	48.45%	6,626	42.61%	1,390	8.94%
1998	7,503	54.98%	5,246	38.44%	899	6.59%
2002	6,600	42.05%	8,598	54.79%	496	3.16%
2006	6,917	39.41%	10,633	60.59%	0	0.00%
2010	11,297	59.05%	7,834	40.95%	0	0.00%
2014	7,864	46.19%	9,163	53.81%	0	0.00%
2018	12,476	55.35%	9,659	42.85%	407	1.81%
2022	14,943	56.90%	10,743	40.90%	578	2.20%

Carbon County has long been considered a bellwether county for Pennsylvania statewide elections. In gubernatorial elections, it was perfect from 1952 to 2014, with the exception of 1982.

At the presidential level, Carbon County has also been a bellwether for Pennsylvania until recently with only one miss (the 1960 presidential election) between 1916 presidential election and the 2000 presidential election, and with a margin within 3.5 points of the statewide margin in every election from 1940 to 2000 except 1964 (5.3% more Democratic) and 1976 (6.9% more Democratic). Al Gore carried the county in 2000. George W. Bush defeated Democrat John Kerry 49.99% to 48.81%, or a margin of 296 votes, in 2004.

Since then, Carbon County has trended Republican relative to the state as a whole; in the 2008 presidential election, John McCain outperformed in Carbon County by 8.5% relative to the state. In the 2012 presidential election, Mitt Romney outperformed by 12.9% relative to the state.

In the 2020 presidential election, Donald Trump won the county overwhelmingly with 65.4% of the vote, the largest presidential victory in the county of any presidential candidate since Lyndon Johnson's landslide in 1964 presidential election.

=== Voter registration ===
As of February 7, 2024, there were 43,217 registered voters in the county. There are 21,871 (50.61%) registered Republicans, 14,592 (33.76%) registered Democrats, 4,723 (10.93%) voters registered non-affiliated voters, and 2,031 (4.70%) voters registered to other parties.

Chart of Voter Registration
1. Republican (50.6%)
2. Democratic (33.8%)
3. Independent (10.9%)
4. Other Parties (4.70%)

=== County commissioners ===
- Wayne Nothstein, Republican
- Mike Sofranko, chairman
- Rocky Ahner, Democratic

=== State Senate ===
- Dave Argall, Republican, Pennsylvania's 29th Senatorial District

=== State House of Representatives ===
- Doyle Heffley, Republican, Pennsylvania's 122nd Representative District

=== United States House of Representatives ===
- Ryan Mackenzie, Republican, Pennsylvania's 7th congressional district

=== United States Senate ===
- John Fetterman, Democrat
- Dave McCormick, Republican

== Education ==
=== Community, junior and technical colleges ===
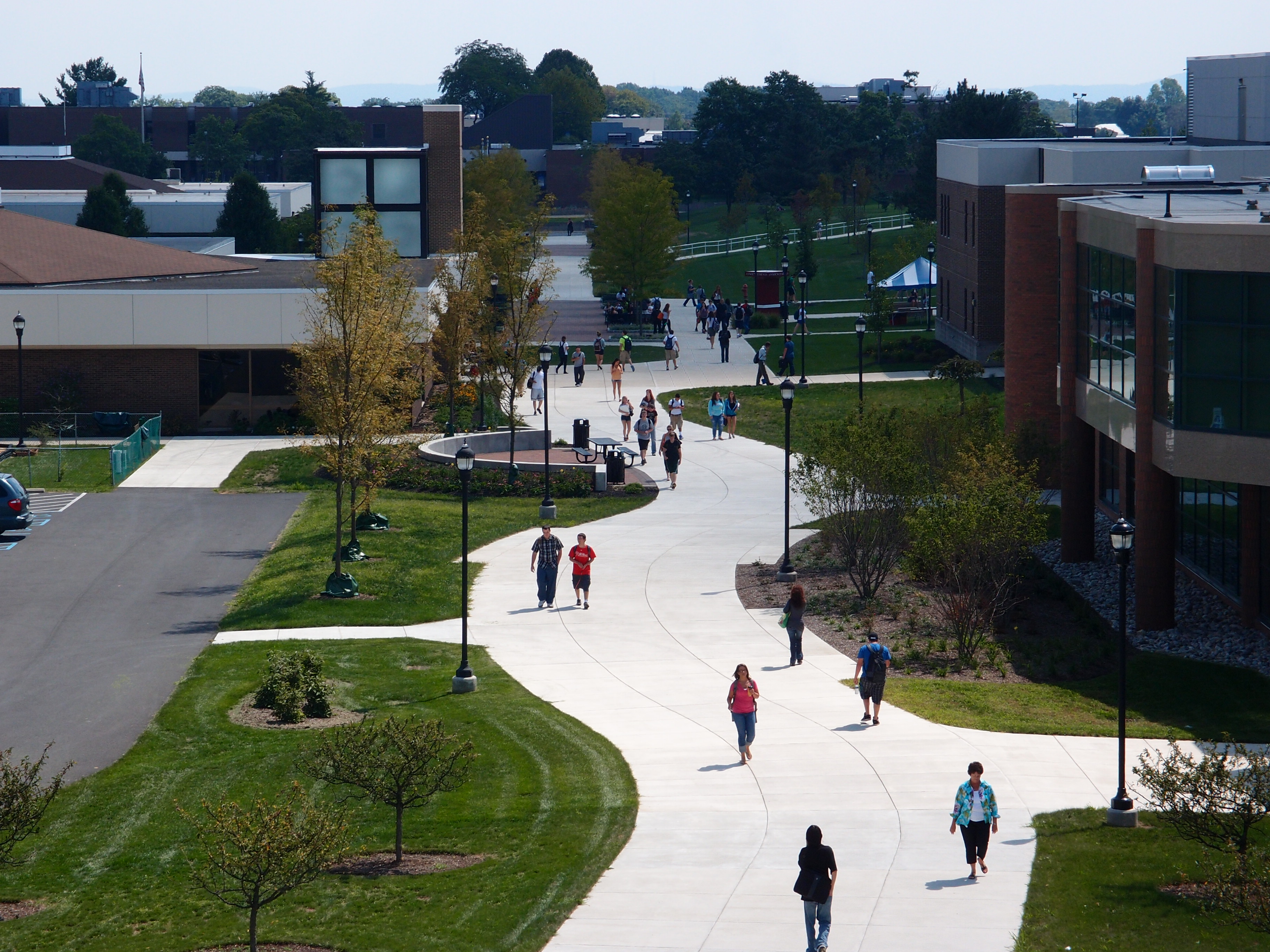
Lehigh Carbon Community College in Schnecksville in May 2014

- Lehigh Carbon Community College – Carbon Campus, Schnecksville, Pennsylvania

=== Public school districts ===
School districts include:

- Hazleton Area School District (also in Luzerne County and Schuylkill County)
- Jim Thorpe Area School District
- Lehighton Area School District
- Palmerton Area School District
- Panther Valley School District (also in Schuylkill County)
- Weatherly Area School District

=== Career technical school ===
Carbon Career and Technical Institute, public school located in Jim Thorpe

=== Intermediate Unit ===
The public and private K-12 schools in Carbon County are served by Carbon-Lehigh Intermediate Unit 21.

== Recreation ==
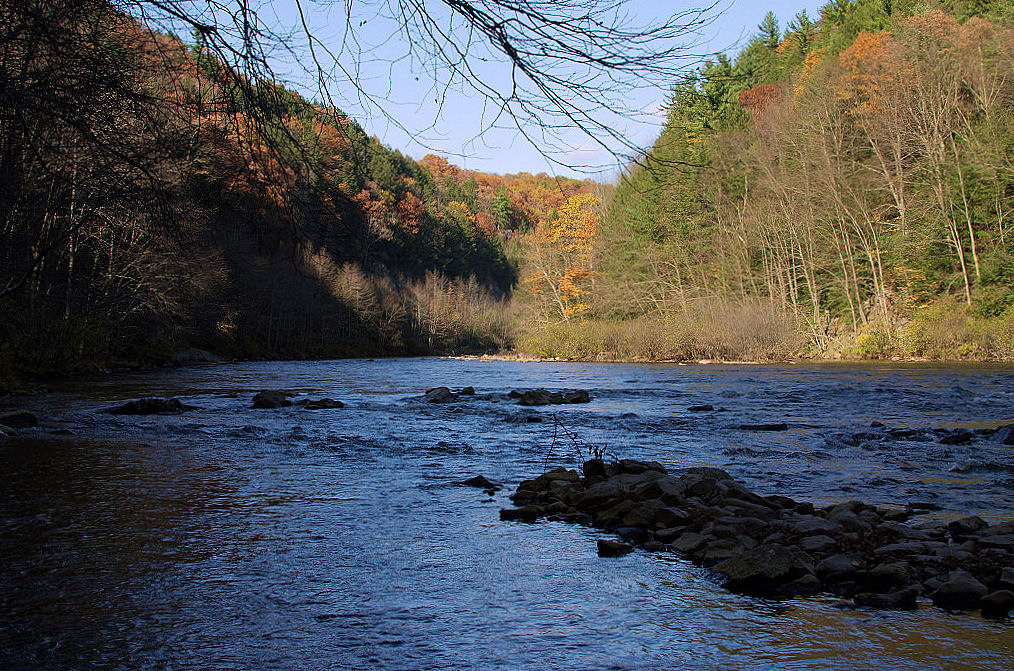
Lehigh Gorge State Park in Carbon County in October 2006

Mauch Chunk Lake is a county-run park that offers swimming, camping, hiking and cross country skiing in the winter. There are three Pennsylvania state parks in Carbon County:

- Beltzville State Park
- Hickory Run State Park
- Lehigh Gorge State Park stretches along the Lehigh River in Luzerne County and into Carbon County.

== Municipalities ==
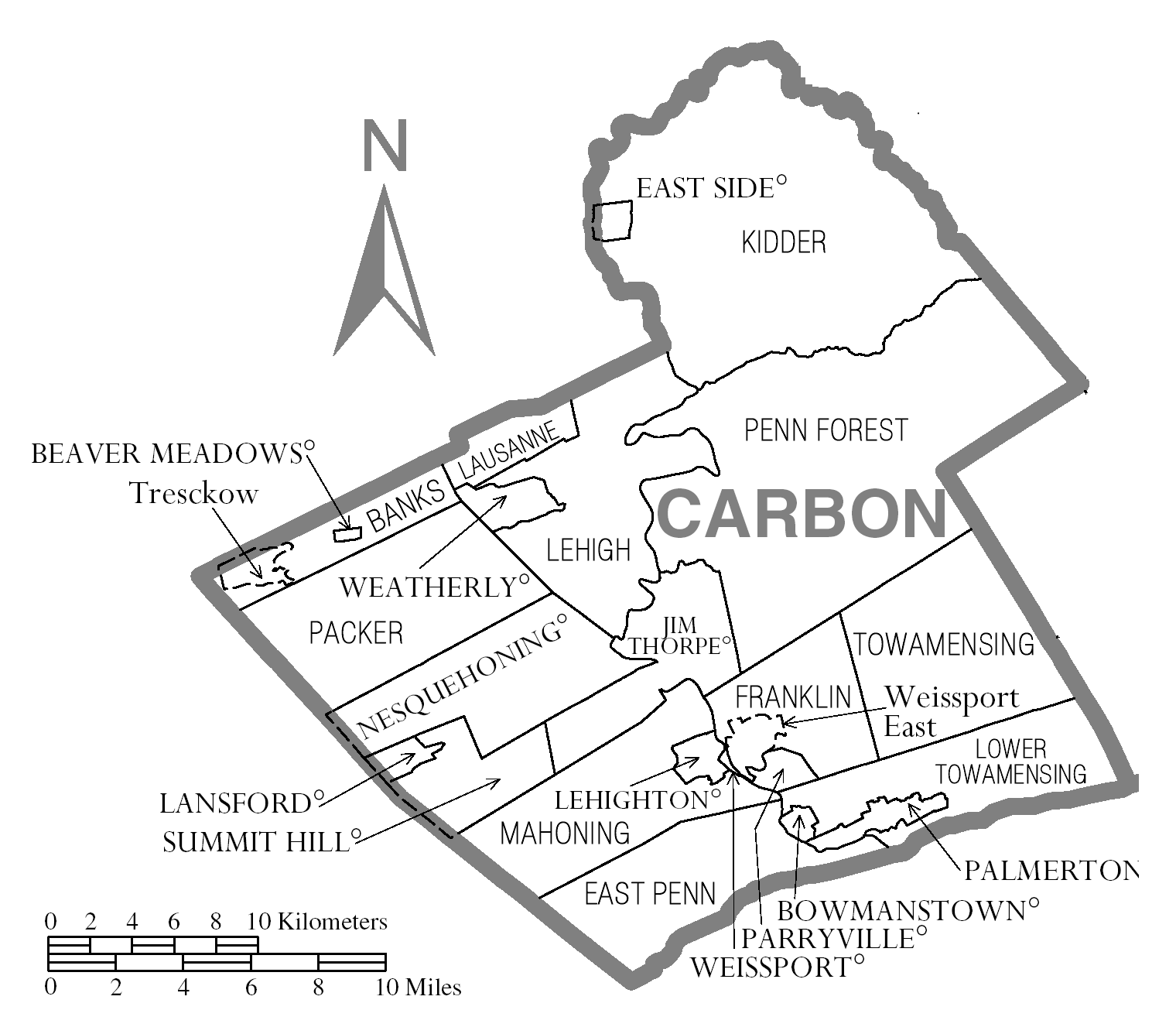
Map of Carbon County

Under Pennsylvania law, there are four types of incorporated municipalities: cities, boroughs, townships, and, in the case of Bloomsburg, a town. The following boroughs and townships are located in Carbon County:

=== Boroughs ===
- Beaver Meadows
- Bowmanstown
- East Side
- Jim Thorpe (county seat)
- Lansford
- Lehighton
- Nesquehoning
- Palmerton
- Parryville
- Summit Hill
- Weatherly
- Weissport

=== Townships ===
- Banks
- East Penn
- Franklin
- Kidder
- Lausanne
- Lehigh
- Lower Towamensing
- Mahoning
- Packer
- Penn Forest
- Towamensing

=== Census-designated places ===
Census-designated places are geographical areas designated by the U.S. Census Bureau for the purposes of compiling demographic data. They are not actual jurisdictions under Pennsylvania law. Other unincorporated communities, such as villages, may be listed here as well.

- Albrightsville
- Holiday Pocono
- Indian Mountain Lake
- Towamensing Trails
- Tresckow
- Weissport East

=== Former communities ===
- Big Creek Valley
- East Mauch Chunk, now an eastern part of Jim Thorpe
- East Penn Township, Pennsylvania, the far eastern part of today's Jim Thorpe at the other end of Bear Mountain (Lehigh Valley)
- Lausanne Landing, the original settlement above the Lehigh Gap at the mouth of the Nesquehoning Creek; terminus of the Lehigh & Susquehanna Turnpike founded in 1804

=== Population ranking ===
The population ranking of the following table is based on the 2010 census of Carbon County.

† county seat

Rank	City/Town/etc.	Municipal type	Population (2010 Census)
1	Lehighton	Borough	5,500
2	Palmerton	Borough	5,414
3	† Jim Thorpe	Borough	4,781
4	Indian Mountain Lake (partially in Monroe County)	CDP	4,372
5	Lansford	Borough	3,941
6	Nesquehoning	Borough	3,349
7	Summit Hill	Borough	3,034
8	Weatherly	Borough	2,525
9	Towamensing Trails	CDP	2,292
10	Weissport East	CDP	1,624
11	Bowmanstown	Borough	937
12	Tresckow	CDP	880
13	Beaver Meadows	Borough	869
14	Parryville	Borough	525
15	Holiday Pocono	CDP	476
16	Weissport	Borough	412
17	East Side	Borough	317
18	Albrightsville	CDP	202

== See also ==
- National Register of Historic Places listings in Carbon County, Pennsylvania
- Quakake Tunnel
