= Jonas, Pennsylvania =

Unincorporated community in Pennsylvania, U.S.

- Unincorporated community
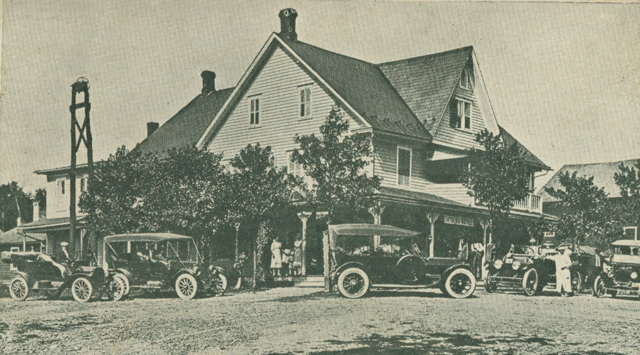
- Early photo of Hotel Jonas

- Location within Pennsylvania Location within the United States
- Coordinates: 40°58′03″N 75°30′43″W
- Country: United States
- State: Pennsylvania
- County: Monroe
- Township: Polk
- Time zone: UTC-5 (Eastern (EST))
  - Summer (DST): UTC-4 (EDT)
- ZIP code: 18058
- Area code(s): 570
- GNIS feature ID: 1178141

Jonas is an unincorporated community in Monroe County, Pennsylvania, United States. It is located on Route 534 in Polk Township, and shares the Kunkletown ZIP code of 18058. Trexler Boy Scout Reservation is located just southeast of Jonas.

Polk Township Volunteer Fire Company has their sub-station located behind the former Hotel Jonas on Jonas Road. It currently houses their retired 1954 GMC along with an active engine and utility truck.

Hotel Jonas was a big part of the village of Jonas and had been around for many years until it permanently closed on May 5, 2012. Jonas Snyder purchased the original inn building and surrounding land in 1858, and his family built the existing hotel in 1901. Hotel Jonas began as a small inn that was known as "Sterner's", a rest stop for early travelers through Northeastern Pennsylvania. It was situated on a stagecoach road that connected the southwestern end of the Pocono area with towns to the north such as White Haven and the cities of Wilkes-Barre and Scranton. The road is presently named State Highway 534.
