= Penn Forest Township, Pennsylvania =

Township in Pennsylvania, US

Penn Forest Township
- Township
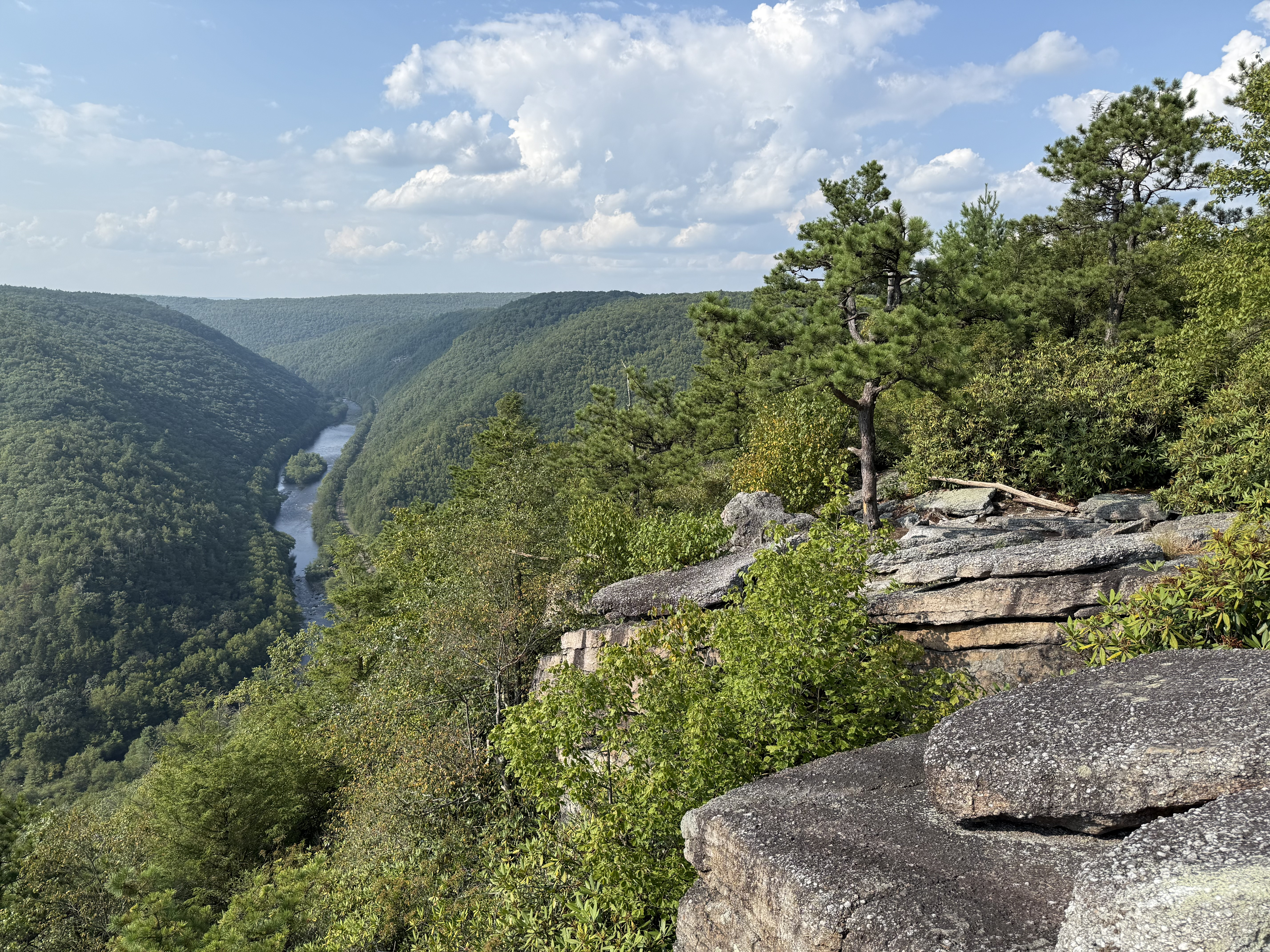
- Tank Hollow Overlook above the Lehigh Gorge in Penn Forest Township

- Seal

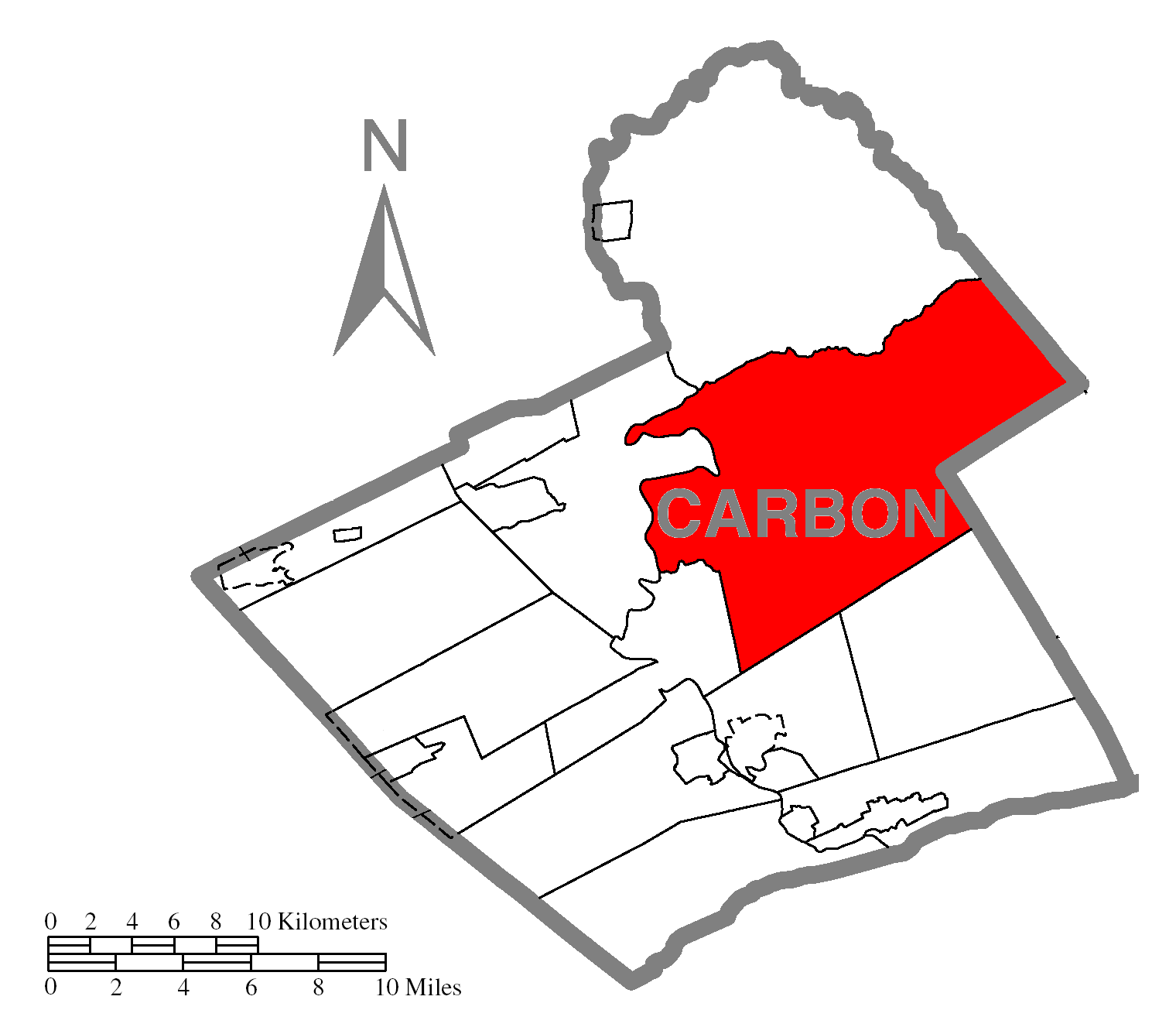
- Location of Penn Forest Township in Carbon County, Pennsylvania

- Location of Carbon County in Pennsylvania
- Coordinates: 40°52′29″N 75°40′59″W
- Country: United States
- State: Pennsylvania
- County: Carbon

Area
  - Total: 74.85 sq mi (193.87 km^{2})
  - Land: 73.81 sq mi (191.16 km^{2})
  - Water: 1.05 sq mi (2.71 km^{2})
- Elevation: 1,690 ft (520 m)

Population (2010)
  - Total: 9,581
  - Estimate (2016): 9,649
  - Density: 130.7/sq mi (50.48/km^{2})
- Time zone: UTC-5 (EST)
  - Summer (DST): UTC-4 (EDT)
- Area code(s): 570
- FIPS code: 42-025-58968
- Website: www.pennforesttownship.org

Penn Forest Township is a township in Carbon County, Pennsylvania. It is part of Northeastern Pennsylvania. The population was 9,581 at the 2010 census, up from 5,439 at the 2000 census.

== Geography ==
The township is the largest by area in Carbon County, occupying a sizable portion of the eastern side of the county. According to the United States Census Bureau, the township has a total area of 74.9 square miles (193.9 km^{2}), of which 73.8 square miles (191.2 km^{2}) is land and 1.0 square mile (2.7 km^{2}), or 1.40%, is water.

The township is drained by the Lehigh River, which meanders along Penn Forest's western border through the Lehigh Gorge. Mud Run, a tributary of the Lehigh, forms the northern border of the township. Its villages include Christmans, Christmansville, and Meckesville, and its census-designated places are Albrightsville (also in Kidder Township), Indian Mountain Lake (also in Monroe County), and Towamensing Trails. A large portion of Hickory Run State Park is located within the township.

=== Neighboring municipalities ===
- Kidder Township (north)
- Lehigh Township (west)
- Jim Thorpe (southwest)
- Franklin Township (south)
- Towamensing Township (south)
- Polk Township, Monroe County (east)
- Chestnuthill Township, Monroe County (tangent to the east)
- Tunkhannock Township, Monroe County (northeast)

=== Climate ===
Penn Forest has a warm-summer humid continental climate (Dfb) and the hardiness zones are 5b and 6a. Average monthly temperatures in Meckesville range from 23.8 °F in January to 68.7 °F in July, and at Penn's Peak on Maury Road they range from 25.3 °F in January to 69.7 °F in July.

== Demographics ==
Historical population
Census	Pop.	Note	%±
2000	5,439		—
2010	9,581		76.2%
2016 (est.)	9,649		0.7%
U.S. Decennial Census

In 2010, Penn Forest Township population was reported as 9,581 people. As of the census of 2000, there were 5,439 people, 2,046 households, and 1,565 families residing in the township. The population density was 73.3 people per square mile (28.3 people/km^{2}). There were 4,806 housing units at an average density of 64.8 per square mile (25.0/km^{2}). The racial makeup of the township was 92.48% White, 3.36% African American, 0.22% Native American, 0.53% Asian, 0.09% Pacific Islander, 1.25% from other races, and 2.06% from two or more races. Hispanic or Latino of any race were 5.39% of the population.

There were 2,046 households, out of which 34.0% had children under the age of 18 living with them, 65.1% were married couples living together, 7.4% had a female householder with no husband present, and 23.5% were non-families. 18.0% of all households were made up of individuals, and 7.4% had someone living alone who was 65 years of age or older. The average household size was 2.65 and the average family size was 3.02.

In the township, the population was spread out, with 26.0% under the age of 18, 5.2% from 18 to 24, 27.9% from 25 to 44, 26.1% from 45 to 64, and 14.8% who were 65 years of age or older. The median age was 39 years. For every 100 females there were 101.0 males. For every 100 females age 18 and over, there were 98.5 males.

The median income for a household in the township was $36,601, and the median income for a family was $40,597. Males had a median income of $39,864 versus $21,774 for females. The per capita income for the township was $17,129. About 7.0% of families and 10.6% of the population were below the poverty line, including 14.0% of those under age 18 and 10.9% of those age 65 or over.

The United States Census Bureau estimated in July 2024, the township's population increased by 6.83% to 10235.

== Transportation ==
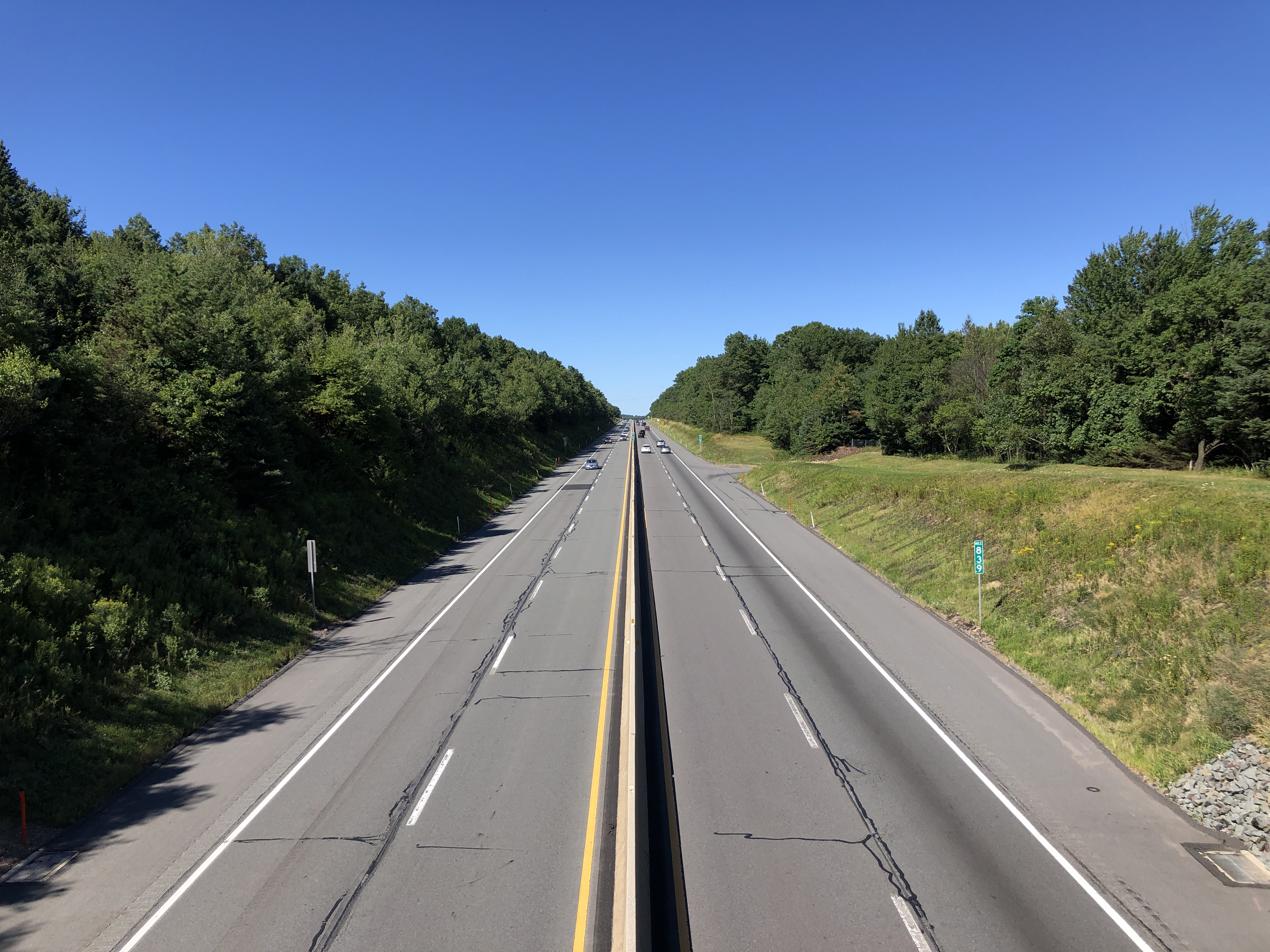
I-476/Northeast Extension northbound in Penn Forest Township

As of 2020, there were 56.26 miles (90.54 km) of public roads in Penn Forest Township, of which 9.10 miles (14.65 km) were maintained by the Pennsylvania Turnpike Commission (PTC), 16.81 miles (27.05 km) were maintained by the Pennsylvania Department of Transportation (PennDOT) and 30.35 miles (48.84 km) were maintained by the township.

Interstate 476 (Pennsylvania Turnpike Northeast Extension) crosses Penn Forest Township north-to-south intersects with Pennsylvania Route 903, with access at interchange number 87. This PA 903 interchange has overhead directional signage listing Jim Thorpe and Lake Harmony as end points. However, PA 903 continues beyond the place name of Lake Harmony until its terminus at PA 115 in Tunkhannock Township, Monroe County. PA 903 crosses the township from northeast to southwest, while Pennsylvania Route 534 crosses in the east and intersects PA 903 in Albrightsville. Other important roads include Hatchery Road, Meckesville Road, Maury Road, and Schock Mill Road. Stony Mountain Road, TR474, bisects the township, connecting PA 903 with PA 534.
