= Jim Thorpe Area School District =

School district in Pennsylvania

Address
- 1100 Center Street Jim Thorpe, Carbon County, Pennsylvania, 18229; United States
- Coordinates: 40.87997°N 75.72511°W

District information
- Type: Public
- Budget: $44.5 million
- NCES District ID: 4212540

Students and staff
- Students: 1,799 (2021-22)
- Teachers: 147.82 (on an FTE basis)
- Student–teacher ratio: 12.17

Other information
- Website: www.jimthorpesd.org

The Jim Thorpe Area School District is located in Carbon County, Pennsylvania, United States. It comprises the borough of Jim Thorpe, Penn Forest Township, and the southern portion of Kidder Township. It covers a total area of 137 square miles (350 km^{2}).

According to 2000 federal census data, the school district serves a resident population of 11,428. By 2010, the district's population increased to 15,791 people. The educational attainment levels for the Jim Thorpe Area School District population (25 years old and over) were 87.8% high school graduates and 19.9% college graduates.

According to the Pennsylvania Budget and Policy Center, 48.9% of Jim Thorpe Area School District's pupils lived at 185% or below the Federal Poverty Level as shown by their eligibility for the federal free or reduced price school meal programs in 2012. In 2013, the Pennsylvania Department of Education, reported that 19 students in the Jim Thorpe Area School District were homeless. In 2009, Jim Thorpe Area School District residents' per capita income was $17,444, while the median family income was $42,637.

In Pennsylvania, the median family income was $49,501 and the United States median family income was $49,445, in 2010.

In Carbon County, the median household income was $48,900, lagging the median US income. By 2013, the median household income in the United States rose to $52,100. In 2014, the median household income in the USA was $53,700.

Jim Thorpe Area School District operates three schools: Lawrence B. Morris Elementary School (Preschool, full-day kindergarten – 8th); Penn Kidder Campus (preK – 8th) and Jim Thorpe Area High School (9th–12th). LB Morris is located in Jim Thorpe. Penn Kidder Campus is located about 15 miles (24 km) from Jim Thorpe in Albrightsville. High school students may choose to attend the Carbon Career and Technical Institute for training in the construction and mechanical trades. For the 2014–15 school year, 97 resident students chose to enroll in public, cyber charter schools, rather than attend the district's schools. The Carbon-Lehigh Intermediate Unit IU21 provides the district with a wide variety of services like: specialized education for disabled students; state mandated training on recognizing and reporting child abuse; speech and visual disability services; criminal background check processing for prospective employees and professional development for staff and faculty.

== Extracurriculars ==
=== Sports ===
District sports teams include:

Varsity

Boys

- Baseball - AAAA
- Basketball - AAAA
- Cross Country - AA
- Football - AAA
- Golf - AA
- Soccer - AA
- Tennis - AA
- Track and Field - AAA
- Wrestling - AA

Girls

- Basketball - AAA
- Cross Country - AA
- Soccer (Fall) - AA
- Softball - AAA
- Girls' Tennis - AA
- Track and Field - AA
- Volleyball

Junior High School Sports

Boys

- Basketball
- Cross Country
- Football
- Track and Field
- Wrestling

Girls

- Basketball
- Cross Country
- Track and Field
