= Kresgeville, Pennsylvania =

Unincorporated community in Pennsylvania, US

- Unincorporated community
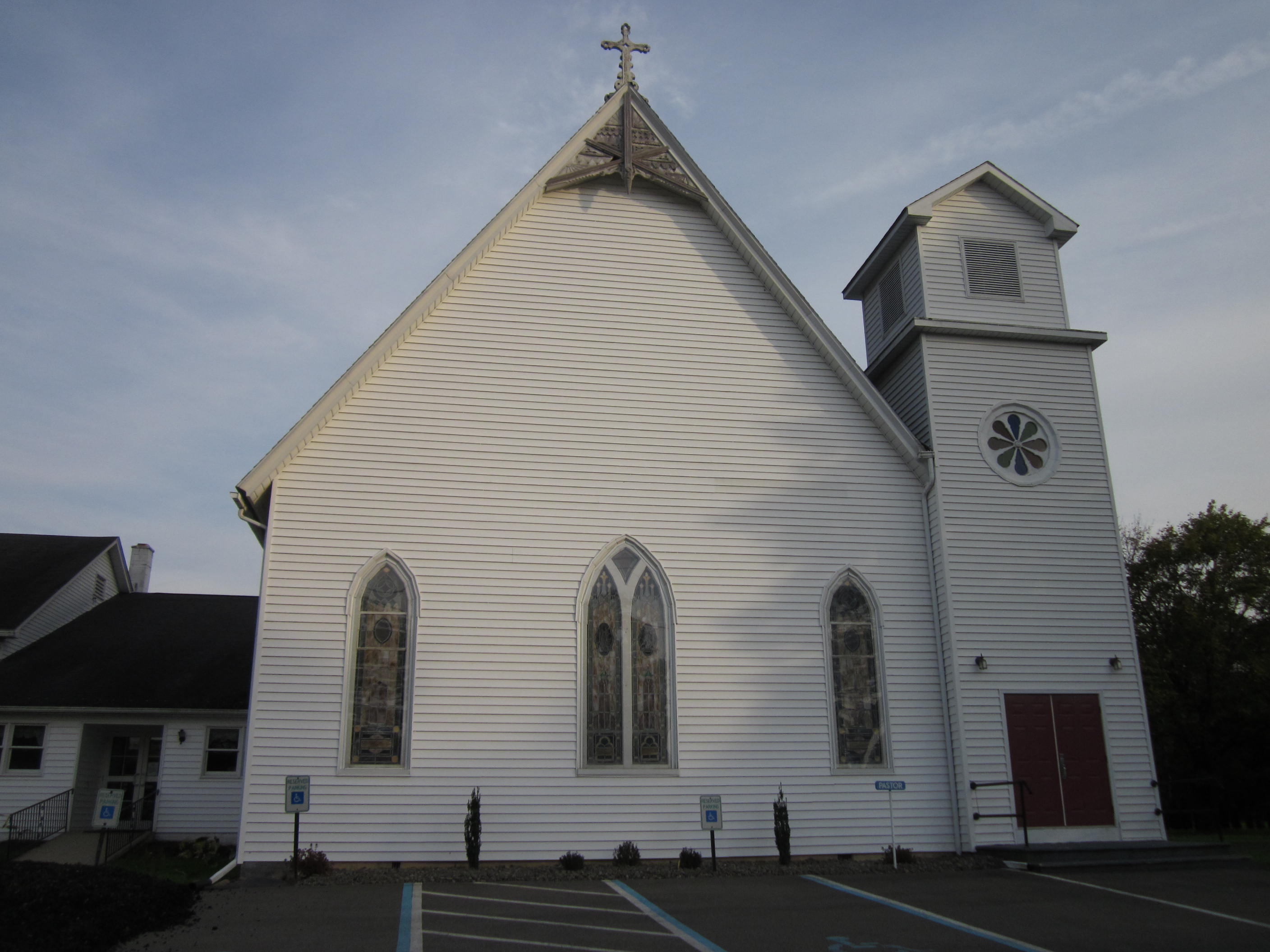
- A church in Kresgeville

- Location within Pennsylvania Location within the United States
- Coordinates: 40°53′49″N 75°30′11″W
- Country: United States
- State: Pennsylvania
- County: Monroe
- Township: Polk
- Elevation: 676 ft (206 m)
- Time zone: UTC-5 (Eastern (EST))
  - Summer (DST): UTC-4 (EDT)
- ZIP code: 18333
- Area code: 610
- GNIS feature ID: 1192723

Kresgeville is an unincorporated community in Monroe County, Pennsylvania. Kresgeville is located on U.S. Route 209, 6 miles (9.7 km) west-southwest of Brodheadsville. Kresgeville has a post office with ZIP code 18333, which opened on January 5, 1846.

== Climate ==
This climatic region has large seasonal temperature differences, with warm to hot (and often humid) summers and cold (sometimes severely cold) winters. The Köppen climate classification subtype for this climate is "Dfa" (Hot Summer Continental Climate).

== Notable people ==
- S. S. Kresge, founder of Kmart
