= Tunkhannock Creek (Tobyhanna Creek tributary) =

Coordinates: 41°03′44″N 75°32′34″W

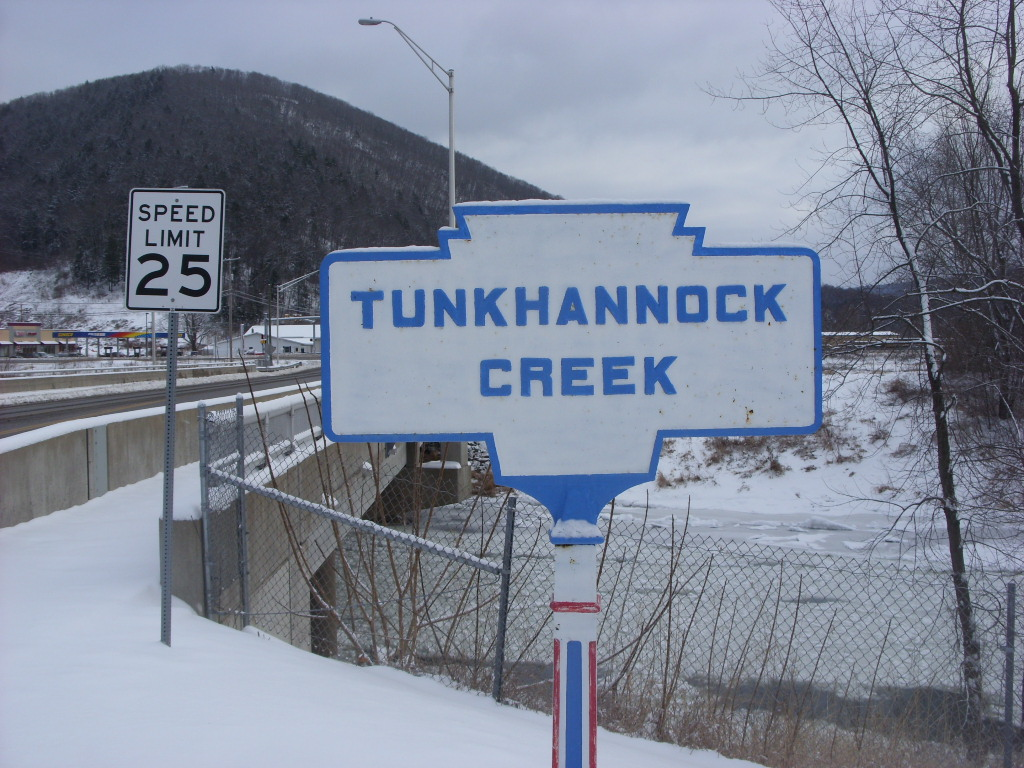
Keystone Marker for Tunkhannock Creek (Tobyhanna Creek) in Tunkhannock, Pennsylvania

Tunkhannock Creek is a 19.2-mile-long (30.9 km) tributary of Tobyhanna Creek in the Poconos of eastern Pennsylvania in the United States.

Tunkhannock Creek joins Tobyhanna Creek near Blakeslee in Monroe County. U.S. Geological Survey Gauging Station 01447680 is located approximately 5 miles (8 km) upstream of this confluence.

== See also ==
- List of rivers of Pennsylvania
