= Hickory Run State Park =

State park in Pennsylvania, United States

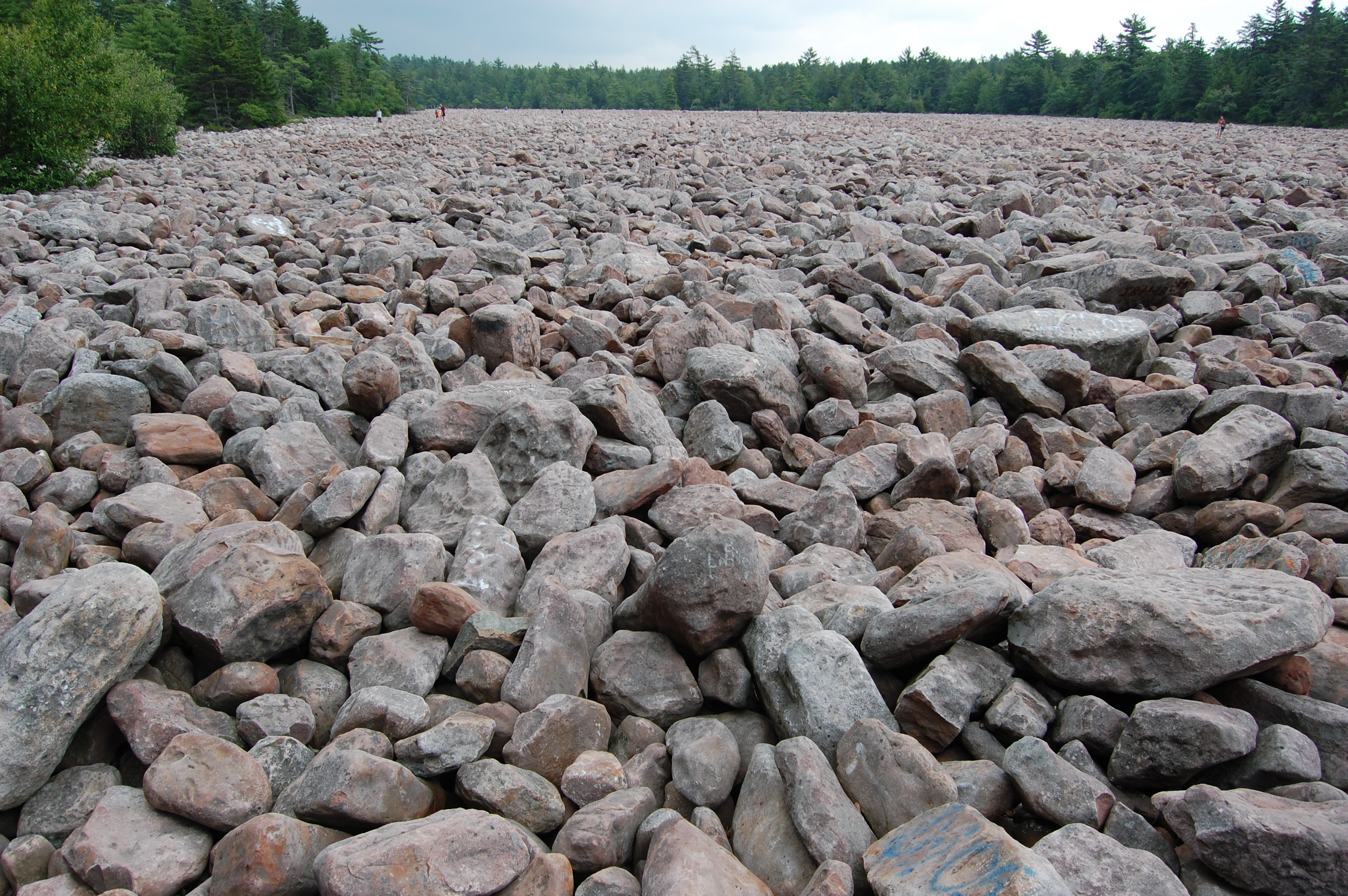
- Boulder field at Hickory Run State Park

- Location within Pennsylvania Location within the United States
- Interactive map of Hickory Run State Park
- Location: Carbon County, Pennsylvania, United States
- Coordinates: 41°01′29″N 75°41′14″W
- Area: 15,990 acres (6,470 ha)
- Elevation: 1,647 feet (502 m)
- Established: 1945
- Administrator: Pennsylvania Department of Conservation and Natural Resources
- Website: Official website
- Pennsylvania State Parks

Hickory Run State Park is a 15,990-acre (6,471 ha) Pennsylvania state park in the Kidder and Penn Forest townships in Carbon County, Pennsylvania in the United States. The park is spread across the Pocono Mountains. The park is easily accessible from Interstate 476 and Interstate 80.

Hickory Run State Park was chosen by the Pennsylvania Department of Conservation and Natural Resources (DCNR) and its Bureau of Parks as one of "25 Must-See Pennsylvania State Parks".

== Recreation ==
The park supports many activities, some of which vary seasonally. During the summer months, swimming is available in Sand Spring Lake. Swimming is allowed only at one designated swimming area, which is a sand beach, of Sand Spring Lake. Furthermore, this swimming area is open for swimming only from late May to mid-September. Because there are no lifeguards, swimming is at your own risk.

In winter, the frozen lake can be used for ice skating. Seasonal hunting is permitted in many areas of the park, with white-tailed deer, black bear, and squirrels among the game that may be hunted legally. Additional hunting opportunities are available in nearby state game lands, some of which border the park.

== Hiking ==
The park contains 44 miles (71 km) of trails that offer a variety of hiking experiences. The 1.5-mile (2.4 km) long "Shades of Death" Trail follows the course of Sand Spring Run through dense rhododendron bushes that bloom from mid-June through mid-July. The run is dammed at certain points, creating lakes. The Fireline, Gould, and Pine Hill Trails are suitable for cross-country skiing in winter. A short 0.7-mile (1.1 km) walk on the Hawk Falls trail leads to a popular waterfall. Biking is prohibited on all trails.

Gallery

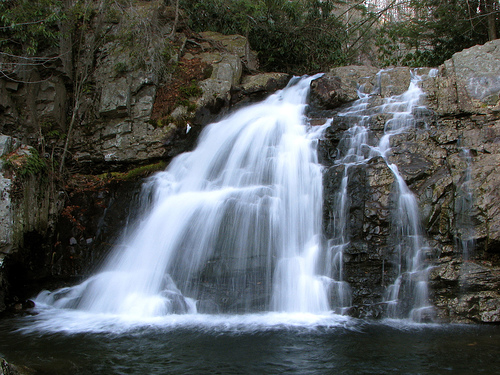
Hawk Falls

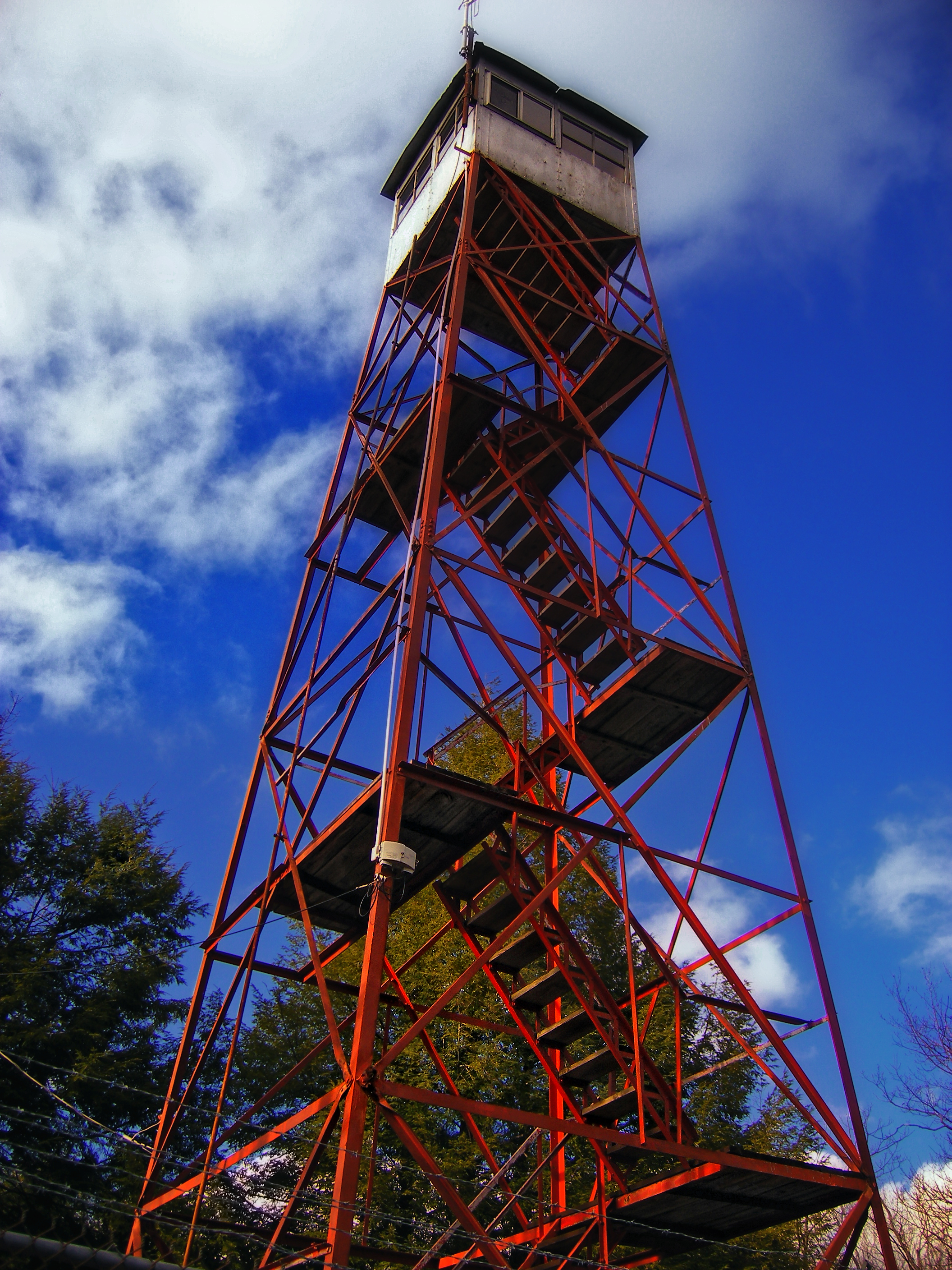
Stony Point Fire Tower

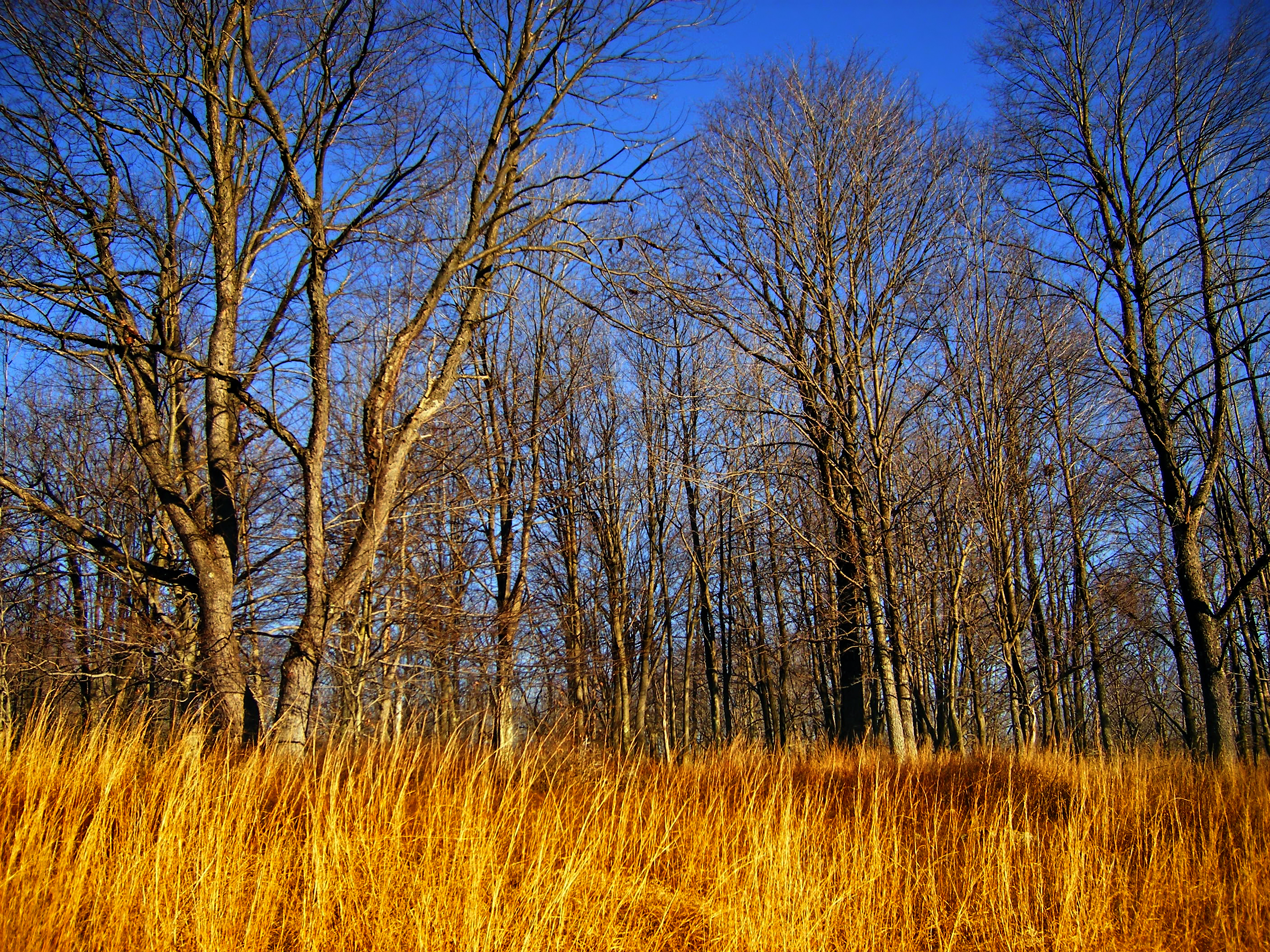
After the leaves fall

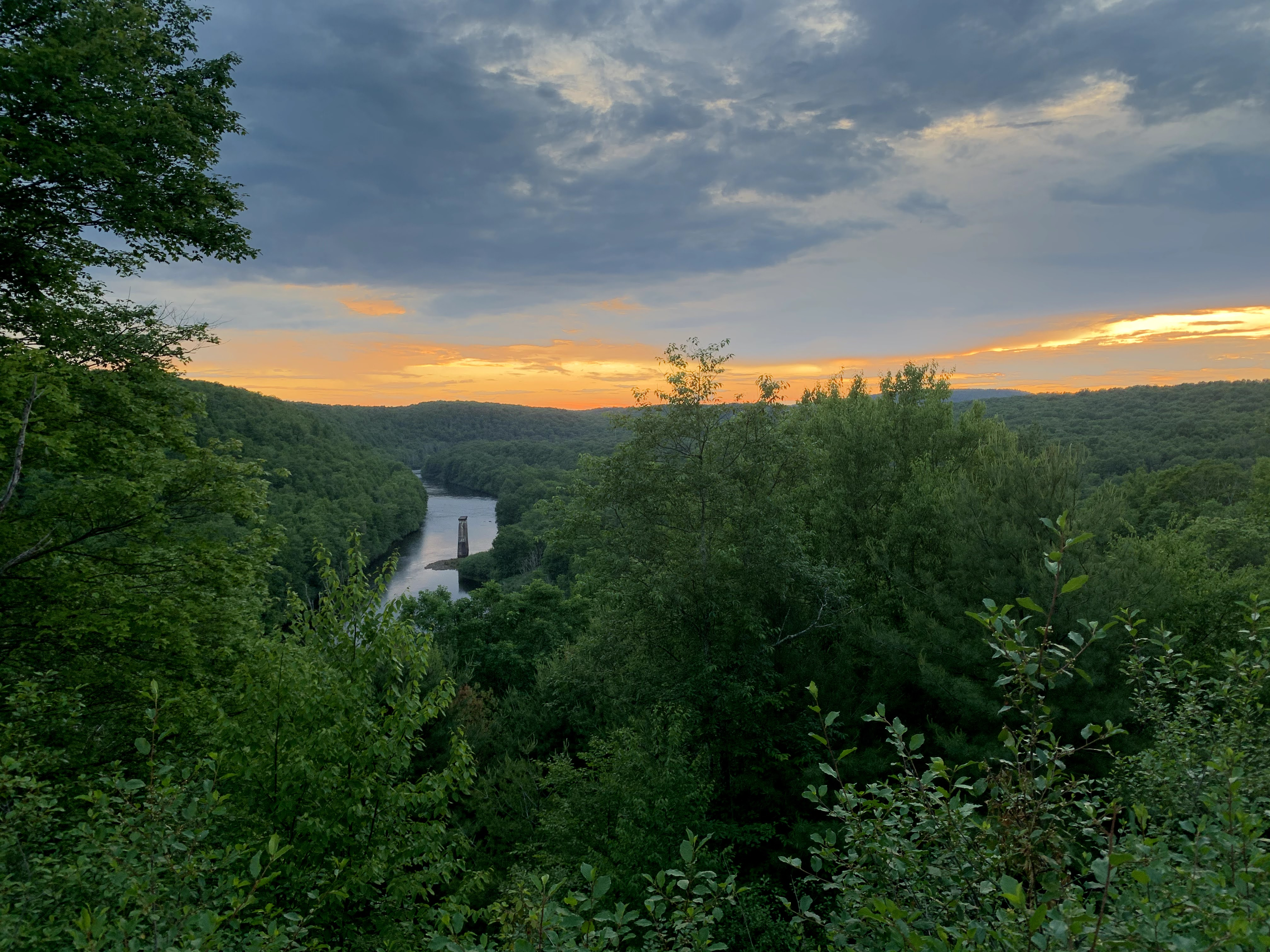
View of the Lehigh Gorge from the Fireline Trail

== Geology ==
The most notable feature of Hickory Run State Park is the huge boulder field located in the northeast corner of the park. The field can be reached by car on Boulder Field Road or by hiking the 3.5-mile (5.6 km) long Boulder Field Trail from the trailhead on SR 534. The field comprises about 720,000 square feet (67,000 m^{2}) (16.5 acres (6.7 ha) or 0.026 square miles (0.067 km^{2})) in area (1,800 feet (550 m) east-west by 400 feet (120 m) north-south). The top of the boulder layer is virtually level with the approaching path. This boulder field, known as the Hickory Run Boulder Field, is the largest of its kind in the Appalachian region. It consists of a very gently sloping expanse of boulders that occupies the axis of a small valley with approximately 100-foot (30 m) of relief. A coniferous forest with stony loam soils surrounds the field.

The field's boulders range from less than 3-foot (0.91 m) to more than 30-foot (9.1 m) in length. They consist of hard, gray-red, medium-grained sandstone and conglomeratic sandstone from the Catskill Formation which forms the adjacent ridgelines. The boulders at the northeast, upslope end of the boulder field, are generally more angular than those found downslope to the southwest. In the southwest part of the boulder field, boulders are typically subrounded and overlie a layer of small, polished clasts with a red weathering rind. To the southeast is a distinct group of boulders, which are less than 15-foot (4.6 m) long. They appear to be bedrock that is shattered in situ.

One of two processes, both involving periglacial processes, explains the formation of boulder fields, such as the Hickory Run boulder field. First, boulder-size blocks are generated from the fracturing of an upslope bedrock outcrop by alternating freeze and thaw. As boulders accumulate at the base of the rock slope, periglacial ice-catalyzed heaving and sliding transports them downslope during cold climatic periods to form boulder fields. Finally, boulder fields are also formed by the exhumation of corestones. Initially, corestones form underground by the action of spheroidal weathering on jointed bedrock. Later, the weathered rock, which is called saprolite and formed by the alteration of rock, is progressively removed by erosion from around the corestones to expose them as isolated boulders. In time, these boulders are altered and redistributed over time by the accumulation of unconsolidated soil and sediment; freeze and thaw; and perhaps by periglacial action or glaciation during cold periods to form boulder fields.

The presence of glacial erratics south of the area of the Hickory Run boulder field indicate that this area has been covered by an ice sheet at least once, although the timing of the ice sheet or multiple ice sheets is uncertain. The most extensive ice sheet to cover the area containing this boulder field occurred prior to 900,000 years ago as evidenced by reversed magnetic polarity glacial deposits found south of the boulder field. Proglacial deposits of normal polarity suggest the occurrence of another glaciation extensive enough to cover this area sometime after 740,000 years ago. The last glaciation to have covered the area of the Hickory Run boulder field is mapped as Illinoian, about 150,000 years ago. However, it is possible that this ice sheet is somewhat older than this at about 400,000 years ago

However, cosmogenic nuclide studies demonstrate that some boulders of the Hickory Run boulder field have been exposed at the near surface for about 600,000 years. The interpretation of this data concluded that this boulder field has survived multiple glacial-interglacial cycles and possibly at least one glaciation. This conclusion would indicate that it and other boulder fields are dynamic features that persisted through multiple glacial-interglacial cycles because of the resistance of boulders to weathering and erosion. The large size of Hickory Run boulder field likely reflects multiple periods of periglacial activity during a number of glacial periods.

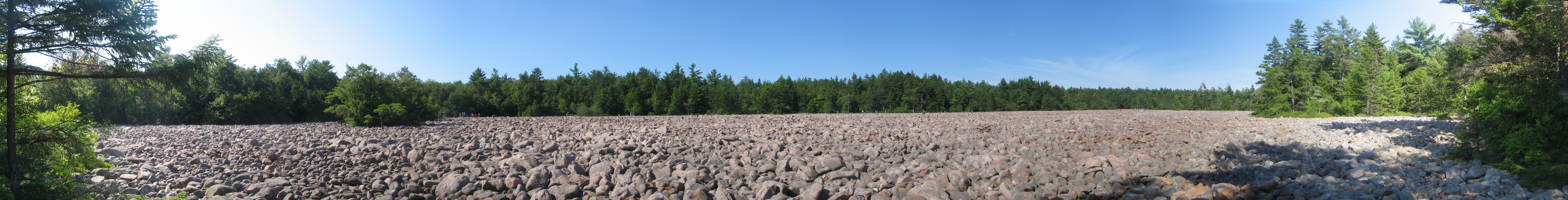
Panoramic view of the Boulder Field, which is 400 by 1,800 feet (120 by 550 m)
