= Palmerton (disambiguation) =

Palmerton is a borough in Pennsylvania, United States.

Palmerton may also refer to:

- Palmerton High School, a public high school in Palmerton, Pennsylvania
- Palmerton Area School District, a public school district in Carbon County, Pennsylvania
- Palmerton, Illinois, an unincorporated community in Cass County, Illinois, United States
- Palmerton Arboretum, an arboretum in Rogue River, Oregon, United States
