= Eldred Township, Monroe County, Pennsylvania =

Township in Pennsylvania, US

Eldred Township
- Township
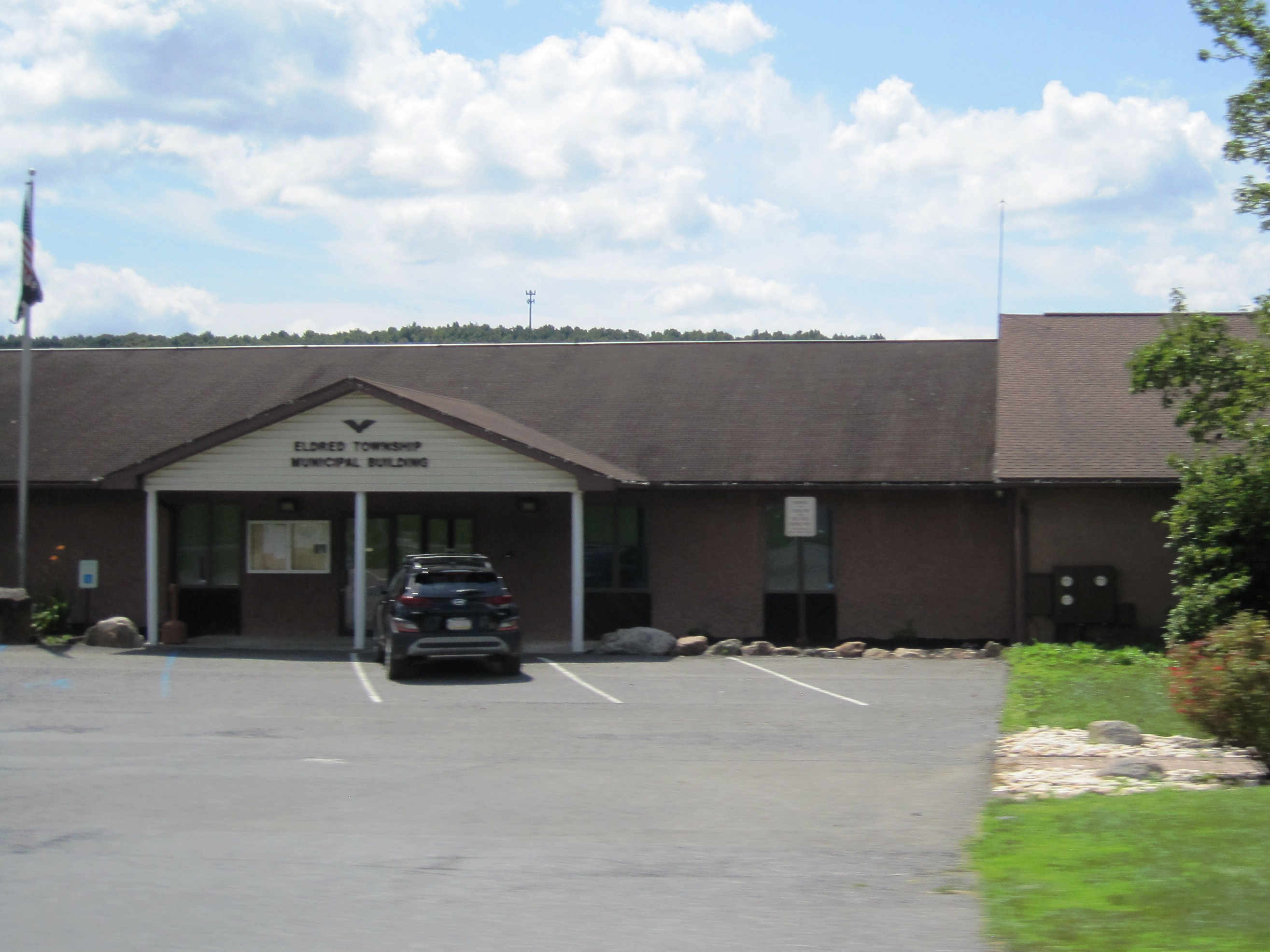
- Eldred Township Municipal Building

- Location of Eldred Township in Monroe County

- Pennsylvania
- Coordinates: 40°52′29″N 75°30′00″W
- Country: United States
- State: Pennsylvania
- County: Monroe

Area
  - Total: 24.51 sq mi (63.47 km^{2})
  - Land: 24.50 sq mi (63.46 km^{2})
  - Water: 0.0039 sq mi (0.01 km^{2})
- Elevation: 919 ft (280 m)

Population (2020)
  - Total: 2,594 ▼
  - Estimate (2021): 2,623
  - Density: 115/sq mi (44.5/km^{2})
- Time zone: UTC-5 (EST)
  - Summer (DST): UTC-4 (EDT)
- Area code: 570
- FIPS code: 42-089-22904
- Website: www.eldredtwp.org

Eldred Township is a township in Monroe County, Pennsylvania, United States. The population was 2,594 at the 2020 census.

== Geography ==
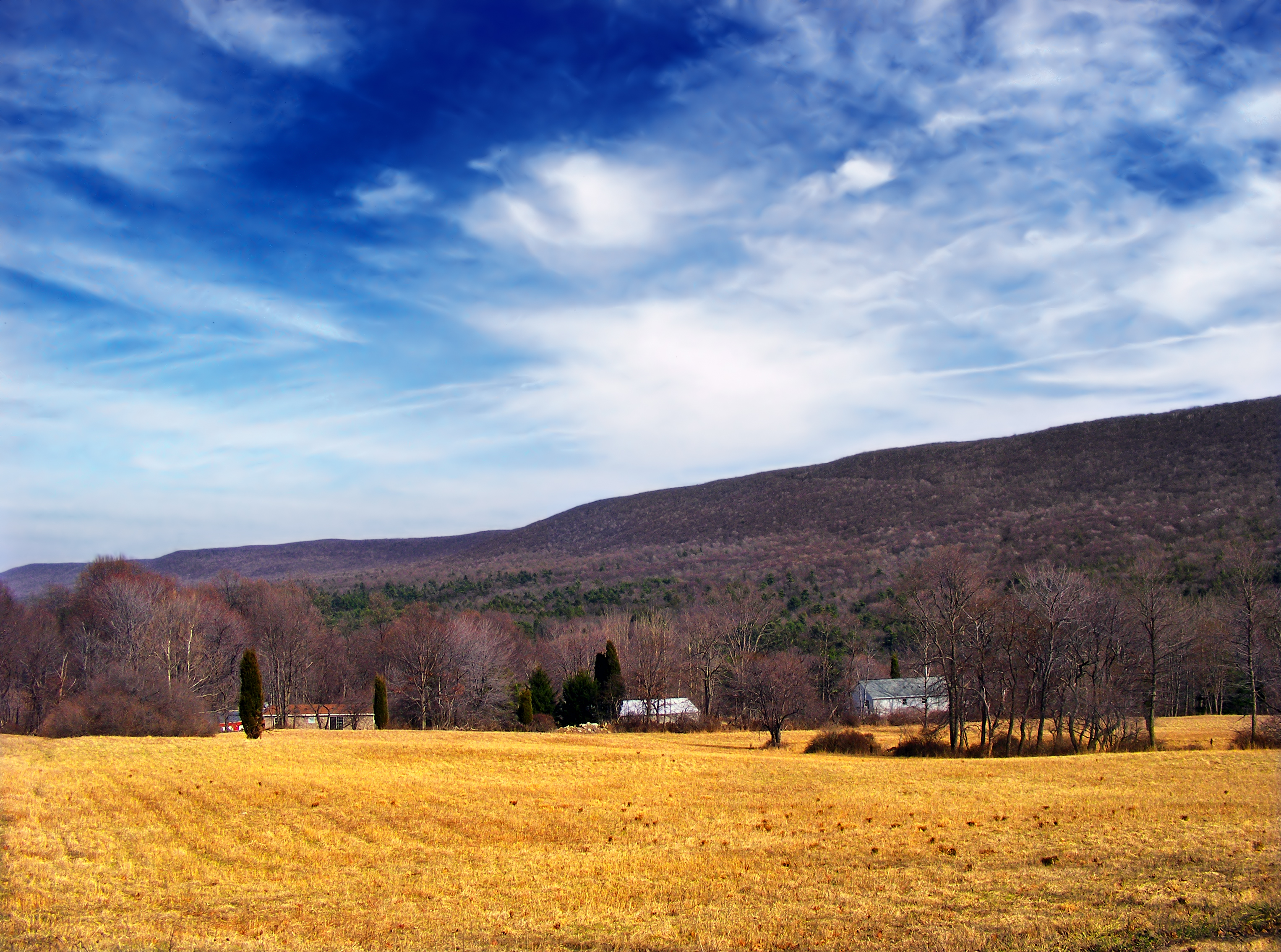
Mountains and a farm in Eldred Township

According to the United States Census Bureau, the township has a total area of 24.3 square miles (63 km^{2}), of which 24.3 square miles (63 km^{2}) is land and 0.04% is water. It is drained by the Aquashicola Creek and the Buckwha Creek westward into the Lehigh River. Blue Mountain forms its natural southern boundary. Its villages include Fiddletown, Kunkletown, and Smith Gap.

=== Neighboring municipalities ===
- Polk Township (north)
- Chestnuthill Township (tangent to the northeast)
- Ross Township (east)
- Moore Township, Northampton County (south)
- Lower Towamensing Township, Carbon County (west)
- Towamensing Township, Carbon County (west)

== Demographics ==
Historical population
Census	Pop.	Note	%±
2000	2,665		—
2010	2,910		9.2%
2020	2,594		−10.9%
2021 (est.)	2,623		1.1%
U.S. Decennial Census

As of the census of 2000, there were 2,665 people, 941 households, and 718 families residing in the township. The population density was 109.6 inhabitants per square mile (42.3/km^{2}). There were 1,069 housing units at an average density of 44.0 per square mile (17.0/km^{2}). The racial makeup of the township was 97.71% White, 0.53% African American, 0.30% Native American, 0.19% Asian, 0.45% from other races, and 0.83% from two or more races. Hispanic or Latino of any race were 1.39% of the population.

There were 941 households, out of which 33.6% had children under the age of 18 living with them, 63.1% were married couples living together, 7.4% had a female householder with no husband present, and 23.6% were non-families. 17.7% of all households were made up of individuals, and 7.2% had someone living alone who was 65 years of age or older. The average household size was 2.72 and the average family size was 3.08.

In the township the population was spread out, with 24.8% under the age of 18, 7.0% from 18 to 24, 28.0% from 25 to 44, 25.7% from 45 to 64, and 14.6% who were 65 years of age or older. The median age was 39 years. For every 100 females, there were 99.5 males. For every 100 females age 18 and over, there were 99.5 males.

The median income for a household in the township was $42,500, and the median income for a family was $46,875. Males had a median income of $32,500 versus $20,811 for females. The per capita income for the township was $18,079. About 7.1% of families and 9.0% of the population were below the poverty line, including 13.5% of those under age 18 and 6.5% of those age 65 or over.

United States presidential election results for Eldred Township, Monroe County, Pennsylvania
Year	Republican		Democratic		Third party(ies)	
Year	No.	%	No.	%	No.	%
2024	1,164	71.15%	458	28.00%	14	0.86%
2020	1,005	66.47%	482	31.88%	25	1.65%
2016	856	67.94%	359	28.49%	45	3.57%
2012	650	57.62%	463	41.05%	15	1.33%
2008	649	54.13%	533	44.45%	17	1.42%
2004	570	52.78%	507	46.94%	3	0.28%
2000	438	49.44%	421	47.52%	27	3.05%

== Climate ==
According to the Trewartha climate classification system, Eldred Township has a Temperate Continental climate (Dc) with warm summers (b), cold winters (o) and year-around precipitation (Dcbo). Dcbo climates are characterized by at least one month having an average mean temperature ≤ 32.0 °F (0 °C), four to seven months with an average mean temperature ≥ 50.0 °F (10 °C), all months with an average mean temperature < 72.0 °F (22 °C) and no significant precipitation difference between seasons. Although most summer days are slightly humid in Eldred Township, episodes of heat and high humidity can occur, with heat index values > 101 °F (38 °C). Since 1981, the highest air temperature has been 99.3 °F (37 °C) on July 22, 2011, and the highest daily average mean dew point was 72.4 °F (22 °C) on August 1, 2006. July is the peak month for thunderstorm activity, which correlates with the average warmest month of the year. The average wettest month is September, which correlates with tropical storm remnants during the peak of the Atlantic hurricane season. Since 1981, the wettest calendar day has been 5.64 inches (143 mm), on September 30, 2010. During the winter months, the plant hardiness zone is 6a, with an average annual extreme minimum air temperature of −5.6 °F (−21 °C). Since 1981, the coldest air temperature was −19.6 °F (−29 °C) on January 21, 1994. Episodes of extreme cold and wind can occur with wind chill values < −17 °F (−27 °C). The average snowiest month is January, which correlates with the average coldest month of the year. Ice storms and large snowstorms depositing ≥ 12 inches (30 cm) of snow occur once every couple of years, particularly during nor’easters from December through March.

Climate data for Eldred Twp, Elevation 755 ft (230 m), 1981-2010 normals, extremes 1981-2018
Month	Jan	Feb	Mar	Apr	May	Jun	Jul	Aug	Sep	Oct	Nov	Dec	Year
Record high °F (°C)	67.1 (19.5)	76.6 (24.8)	84.4 (29.1)	90.9 (32.7)	92.7 (33.7)	92.8 (33.8)	99.3 (37.4)	96.7 (35.9)	94.0 (34.4)	86.9 (30.5)	77.3 (25.2)	70.2 (21.2)	99.3 (37.4)
Mean daily maximum °F (°C)	35.7 (2.1)	39.0 (3.9)	47.4 (8.6)	59.8 (15.4)	70.5 (21.4)	78.5 (25.8)	82.9 (28.3)	81.0 (27.2)	74.2 (23.4)	62.6 (17.0)	51.2 (10.7)	39.7 (4.3)	60.3 (15.7)
Daily mean °F (°C)	26.8 (−2.9)	29.4 (−1.4)	37.2 (2.9)	48.2 (9.0)	58.5 (14.7)	67.2 (19.6)	71.7 (22.1)	70.0 (21.1)	62.7 (17.1)	51.1 (10.6)	41.6 (5.3)	31.4 (−0.3)	49.7 (9.8)
Mean daily minimum °F (°C)	17.9 (−7.8)	19.7 (−6.8)	26.9 (−2.8)	36.6 (2.6)	46.5 (8.1)	55.8 (13.2)	60.5 (15.8)	58.9 (14.9)	51.2 (10.7)	39.5 (4.2)	32.1 (0.1)	23.1 (−4.9)	39.2 (4.0)
Record low °F (°C)	−19.6 (−28.7)	−8.3 (−22.4)	−1.4 (−18.6)	13.7 (−10.2)	29.5 (−1.4)	35.7 (2.1)	41.7 (5.4)	37.1 (2.8)	30.7 (−0.7)	19.0 (−7.2)	5.0 (−15.0)	−6.1 (−21.2)	−19.6 (−28.7)
Average precipitation inches (mm)	3.39 (86)	2.88 (73)	3.71 (94)	4.05 (103)	4.26 (108)	4.76 (121)	4.63 (118)	4.14 (105)	4.91 (125)	4.48 (114)	3.85 (98)	4.02 (102)	49.08 (1,247)
Average snowfall inches (cm)	13.9 (35)	10.0 (25)	10.4 (26)	2.5 (6.4)	0.0 (0.0)	0.0 (0.0)	0.0 (0.0)	0.0 (0.0)	0.0 (0.0)	0.1 (0.25)	2.6 (6.6)	8.3 (21)	47.8 (121)
Average relative humidity (%)	70.2	66.2	61.5	59.9	63.8	71.1	71.0	74.2	74.6	72.0	71.3	71.9	69.0
Average dew point °F (°C)	18.4 (−7.6)	19.5 (−6.9)	25.2 (−3.8)	34.9 (1.6)	46.3 (7.9)	57.5 (14.2)	61.8 (16.6)	61.4 (16.3)	54.5 (12.5)	42.4 (5.8)	33.0 (0.6)	23.4 (−4.8)	40.0 (4.4)
Source: PRISM

== Transportation ==
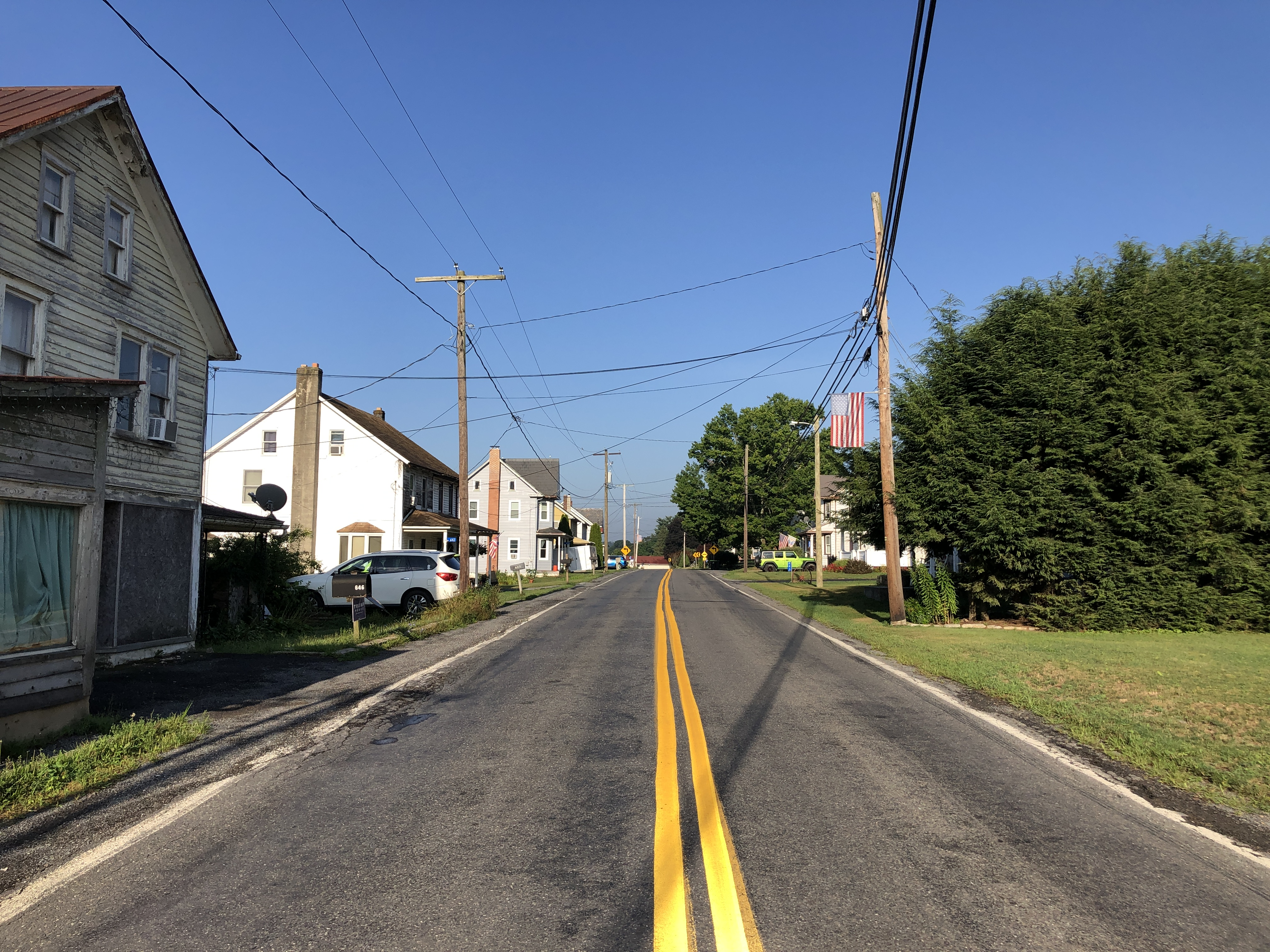
Kunkletown Road in Eldred Township

As of 2020, there were 55.25 miles (88.92 km) of public roads in Eldred Township, of which 20.81 miles (33.49 km) were maintained by the Pennsylvania Department of Transportation (PennDOT) and 34.44 miles (55.43 km) were maintained by the township.

No numbered highways pass through Eldred Township. The township's main thoroughfares include Chestnut Ridge Drive, Fiddletown Road, Kunkletown Road, Molasses Valley Road, Silver Spring Boulevard, Upper Smith Gap Road, Lower Smith Gap Road and Weir Mountain Road.

== Ecology ==
According to the A. W. Kuchler U.S. potential natural vegetation types, Eldred Township would have a dominant vegetation type of Appalachian Oak (104) with a dominant vegetation form of Eastern Hardwood Forest (25). The peak spring bloom typically occurs in late-April and peak fall color usually occurs in mid-October. The plant hardiness zone is 6a with an average annual extreme minimum air temperature of −5.6 °F (−21 °C).
