= Aquashicola, Pennsylvania =

Unincorporated community in Pennsylvania, US

- Unincorporated community
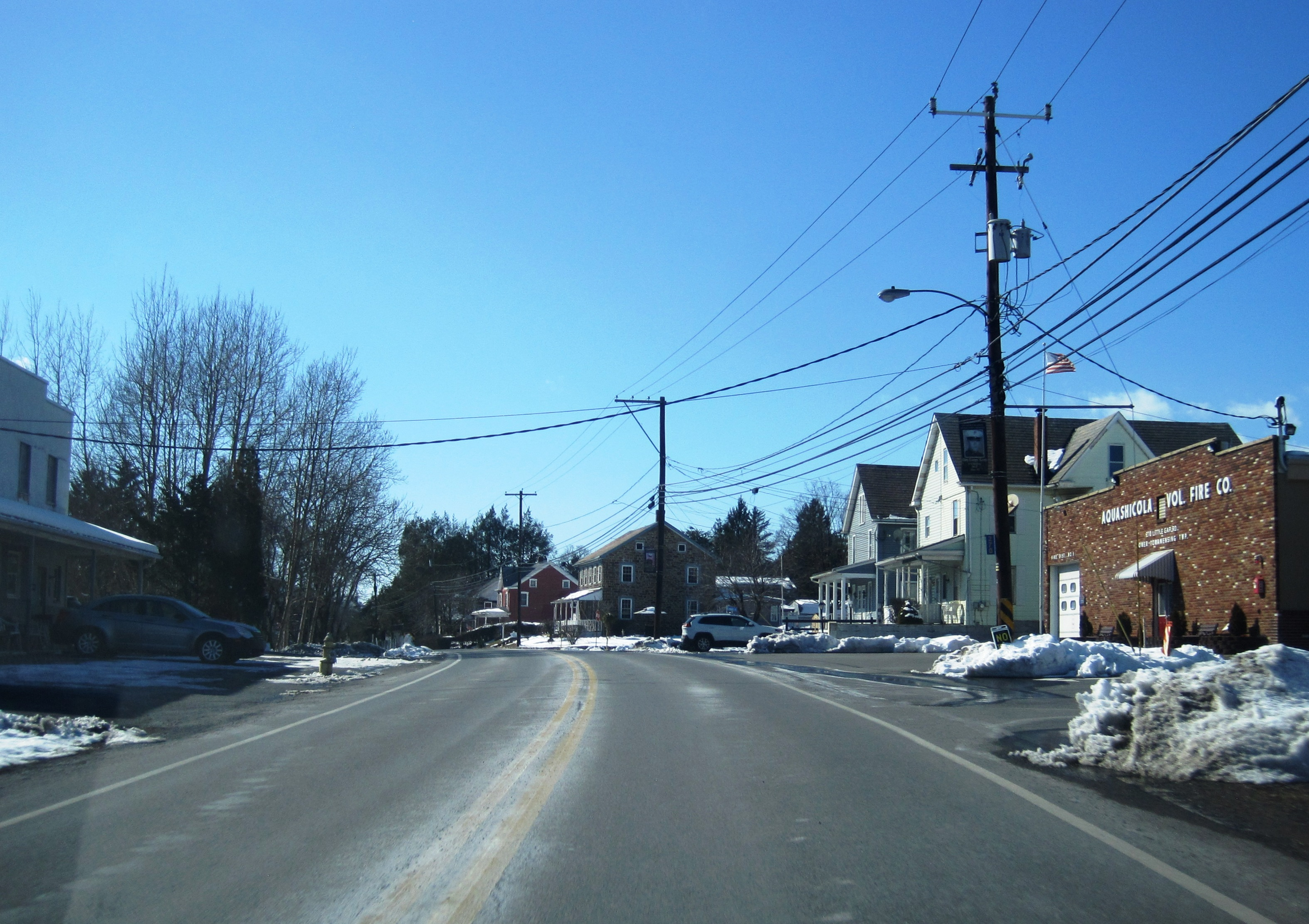
- Westbound along Little Gap Road

- Location within Pennsylvania Location within the United States
- Coordinates: 40°48′40″N 75°35′25″W
- Country: United States
- State: Pennsylvania
- County: Carbon
- Township: Lower Towamensing
- Elevation: 413 ft (126 m)
- Time zone: UTC-5 (Eastern (EST))
  - Summer (DST): UTC-4 (EDT)
- ZIP code: 18012
- Area codes: 610 and 484
- GNIS feature ID: 1168357

Aquashicola (locally pronounced ack-wa-SHIK-la) is an unincorporated community located in Lower Towamensing Township in Carbon County, Pennsylvania. Aquashicola is located at the intersection of Little Gap Road and Forest Inn Road north of the Aquashicola Creek and immediately east of Palmerton.

== History ==
"Aquashicola is an Indian word that means 'Where we fish with the bush nets.' Postal service employees changed the name from Millport to Aquashicola to distinguish it from another Millport in Potter County." "The village was the site of a grist-mill, established in 1806 by George Ziegenfuss Sr. It...remained in use until 1930." "In 1830, a tannery was built along Aquashicola Creek." "The tannery was destroyed by fire in 1874. In 1844, an Evangelical Church was organized. In 1866, the United Methodist Church was formed."
