= Buckwha Creek =

Coordinates: 40.85197°N 75.43664°W

Buckwha Creek is a 12.6-mile-long (20.3 km) tributary of Aquashicola Creek in the Poconos of eastern Pennsylvania in the United States.

The creek originates in a swamp to the southwest of Saylorsburg, flowing southwest along the northwest side of Chestnut Ridge. About five miles below its source, it is dammed to form Princess Lake, about a mile above Kunkletown.

Buckwha Creek cuts south through Chestnut Ridge at Little Gap and joins Aquashicola Creek approximately 1.2 miles (1.9 km) downstream.

== Tributaries ==
- Hunter Creek
- Borger Creek
- Chapple Creek
- Princess Run

== See also ==
- List of rivers of Pennsylvania
