= Ashok K. Shetty =

Indian-born American neuroscientist

- Born: India
- Education: PhD, Neuroscience, All India Institute of Medical Sciences, New Delhi
- Scientific career
- Institutions: Texas A&M University College of Medicine; Duke University

Ashok K. Shetty is an Indian-born American neuroscientist. He is a University Distinguished Professor in the Department of Cell Biology and Genetics and associate director at the Institute for Regenerative Medicine at Texas A&M University.

== Early life and education ==
Shetty was born in India. He earned his PhD in Neuroscience from the All India Institute of Medical Sciences, New Delhi before moving to the United States to complete postdoctoral research at Duke University.

== Career ==
Shetty remained at Duke following his postdoctoral studies and became an assistant professor in their Division of Neurosurgery in 1995. Following his promotion to full professor in 2004, Shetty led a study which demonstrated two methods for developing new brain cells. His research team found that infusions of Fibroblast growth factor 2 led to an increase in brain cells, and the implanting of two types of brain-cell precursors could also lead to the production of new cells. Shetty left Duke in 2011 to join Texas A&M University College of Medicine as a Professor and the Director of Neurosciences at the Institute for Regenerative Medicine in the Department of Cell Biology and Genetics. In this new role, he oversaw a research team which discovered that grafting stem cells from one part of the brain into another can restore important cognitive functions and also trigger the growth of new neurons.

While at Texas A&M, Shetty began to focus on improving brain function in conditions such as temporal lobe epilepsy, traumatic brain injury, Alzheimer's disease, and Gulf War Illness. He collaborated with Darwin Prockop to develop a nasal spray that would inject vesicles isolated from adult mesenchymal stem cell to limit damages caused by Status epilepticus. The two later adapted this research into a potential therapy for Alzheimer’s disease and sold the intellectual property license to Celltex Therapeutics Corporation. In 2022, Shetty was awarded a grant from the United States Department of Defense (DoD) to identify a pharmaceutical treatment for traumatic brain injuries. He also received a grant from the DoD to fund his research on veterans with Gulf War illness.

Shetty was appointed a University Distinguished Professor in the Department of Cell Biology and Genetics in 2024. While in this new role, he oversaw the development of a nasal spray that could improve the brain function of people with Alzheimer’s and slow down their rate of cognitive decline. In recognition of his efforts, Shetty and Texas A&M were named a 2025 honoree of Fast Company's World Changing Ideas.
