= Palmerton Area School District =

School district in Pennsylvania

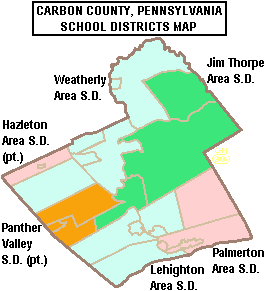
- Location of Palmerton Area School District in Carbon County, Pennsylvania

Address
- 680 Fourth Street Palmerton, Carbon County, Pennsylvania, 18071; United States
- Coordinates: 40.80353927612305°N 75.60883331298828°W

District information
- Type: Public
- Budget: $34.0 million
- NCES District ID: 4218360

Students and staff
- Students: 1,674 (as of 2021-22)
- Teachers: 142.4 (on an FTE basis) (as of 2021-22)
- Student–teacher ratio: 11.76 (as of 2021-22)
- Athletic conference: Colonial League
- District mascot: Boeing B-17 Flying Fortress
- Colors: Blue and White

Other information
- Website: www.palmerton.org

Palmerton Area School District is a public school district located in Carbon County, Pennsylvania. It serves the boroughs of Palmerton and Bowmanstown, and Lower Towamensing Township and Towamensing Township. The district encompasses approximately 56 square miles (150 km^{2}). As of the 2000 census, it served a resident population of 12,791.

As of 2010, the district's population was 14,056 people. The educational attainment levels for the Palmerton Area School District population (25 years old and over) were 85% high school graduates and 14% college graduates. The district is one of the 500 public school districts of Pennsylvania.

According to the Pennsylvania Budget and Policy Center, 38.9% of the district's pupils lived at 185% or below the Federal Poverty Level as shown by their eligibility for the federal free or reduced price school meal programs in 2012.

In 2013, the Pennsylvania Department of Education, reported that less than 10 students in the Palmerton Area School District were homeless. In 2009, the district residents' per capita income was $17,361, while the median family income was $42,072.

In Pennsylvania, the median family income was $49,501 and the United States median family income was $49,445, in 2010.

The district operates five schools: Stephen S. Palmer Elementary School (2–6); Parkside Elementary School (K–1); Towamensing Elementary School (K–6); Palmerton Area Junior High School (7-8) and Palmerton Area High School (9-12). The junior high and senior high are in a single building. High school students may choose to attend the Carbon Career & Technical Institute for training in the construction and mechanical trades. For the 2015–16 school year, 48 resident students chose to enroll in public charter schools, rather than attend the district's schools.

The Towamensing school provided kindergarten to 4th grade until 1986. In 1986–87 school year, they were expanded to 6th grade. Before the school expanded, it only had one 1st, 2nd, 3rd, and 4th grade class. After the expansion, those grades were doubled as well as the expansion of the two 5th and 6th grade classes.

== Extracurriculars ==
=== Sports ===
The district's sports teams include:

Varsity

Boys

- Baseball - AAA
- Basketball - AAA
- Cross country - A
- Football - AA
- Golf - AA
- Soccer - AA
- Tennis - AA
- Track and field - AA
- Wrestling - AA

Girls

- Basketball - AAA
- Cross country - A
- Field hockey - A
- Soccer - AA
- Softball - AAA
- Track and field - AA

According to PIAA directory July 2016

Junior high school sports

Boys

- Basketball
- Cross country
- Football
- Track and field
- Wrestling

Girls

- Basketball
- Cross country
- Field hockey
- Girls Wrestling
- Track and field

Edited 11/6/24 by PASD Administrators
