= Meniolagomeka =

Meniolagomeka (also Meniolágoméka) was a Moravian Church settlement of German missionaries and Lenape converts on the Aquashicola Creek near Kunkletown and Smith's Gap in Monroe County, Pennsylvania. Moravian workers included Brothers Bernhard Adam Grubè/Grube, John Joseph Bull (Schebosh), Nathanael Seidel, Georg Jungmann, Johann Peter Yarrel, Georg Jungmann, Abraham Bünninger, Johann Jacob Schmick, and Sisters Anna Margarethe Jungmann (née Bechtel, widowed Büttner) and Anna Nitschmann. It was organized formally in 1742 on directions from Count Nicholas von Zinzendorf and had approximately 50-60 Indian and missionary residents. Lenape residents included Teedyuskung, Wiwumkamek, Telepuwechque, Kullis, Achkowema, Uchqueschis, Machschapochque, and Mamsochalend.

The Moravians were evicted from Meniolagomeka as an after-effect of the Walking Purchase. In April 1754, 65 converts moved to Wyomick, and another 49 converts moved to Gnadenhütten. On November 24 1755, the mission at Gnadenhütten was attacked and 11 missionaries killed. None of the Native American converts were harmed, however when they prepared to attack the assailants, a missionary told them to flee instead.

A stone monument was dedicated by the Moravian Historical Society on October 22, 1901.
