= Laneco =

American supermarket chain

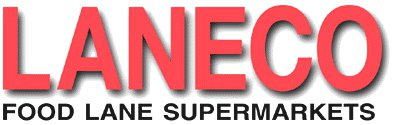
- Type: Retail
- Founded: 1946
- Defunct: 2001
- Fate: Liquidation
- Area served: Pennsylvania, New Jersey
- Key people: Raymond A. Bartolacci Sr.
- Products: Grocery, Department Store
- Website: None

Laneco was a supermarket chain operating in eastern Pennsylvania and northern New Jersey. Laneco operated four types of stores. The older stores were called Food Lane, which were former Food Fair stores with the least square footage and only carried food products. There were also Laneco's and Laneco SuperCenters. The Clinton, New Jersey store was known as a "Laneco Dept Store", which were much larger than Food Lanes and offered general merchandise. Sam Walton worked with Raymond A. Bartolacci Sr. to develop the Wal-Mart Supercenter. Laneco also operated CR Pharmacies, which were often located in Laneco Supercenters.

== History ==
"Why Pay More?" logo, the brand of Laneco

Laneco was founded by Raymond A. Bartolacci Sr. in 1946. The first store opened as Paramount Foods in Easton, Pennsylvania, and completed its first day of business with a total of less than $20 in sales. The stores were acquired by Supervalu in October 1992, and were closed by them in 2001.

The stores were scaled down for the last several years until they were closed. The stores operated with a union and several thousand employees were laid off at the closure of the stores. Laneco had around 16 stores at the time of closure. Many stores were purchased by and converted to Giant such as the Lehighton, Pennsylvania location while Redner's picked up a few locations. Country Junction took over the Wind Gap store. Ahart's Market operated a few locations, including the former Food Lanes in Allentown, Bethlehem, and Phillipsburg, New Jersey, each of which have since closed.

The Clinton and the Whitehouse (now closed) SuperCenters in New Jersey are now Wal-Mart stores. The Laneco in Phillipsburg was demolished and replaced with a Wal-Mart, a White Castle, a Wawa, and a Quaker Steak & Lube (later replaced by Stone Tavern) now occupying the redeveloped site. The Hometown, Pennsylvania Laneco became a TJ Bart's location before eventually closing and the lot being used to build a Wal-Mart.

In 1997, TJ Bart's acquired the Laneco in Southside Easton, and eventually selling it to C-town in 2006.

== Products ==
Laneco carried a store brand of many grocery products called Why Pay More?. The logo for Why Pay More? items was a smiling woman holding a receipt in her left hand and cash in her right, the latter presumably having been spared by the former.
