= Lower Towamensing Township, Pennsylvania =

Township in Pennsylvania, US

Lower Towamensing Township
- Township
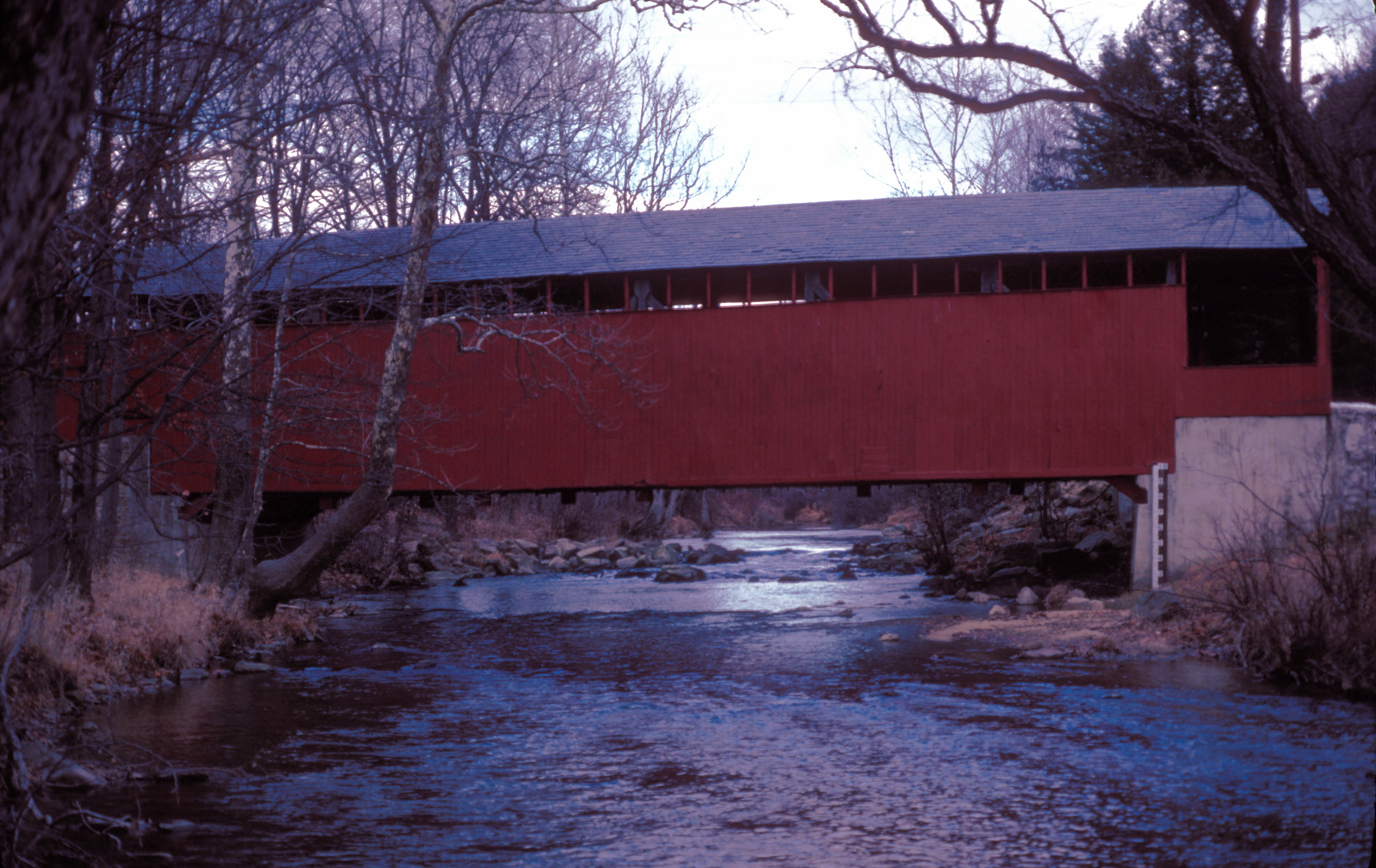
- Little Gap Covered Bridge, February 1971

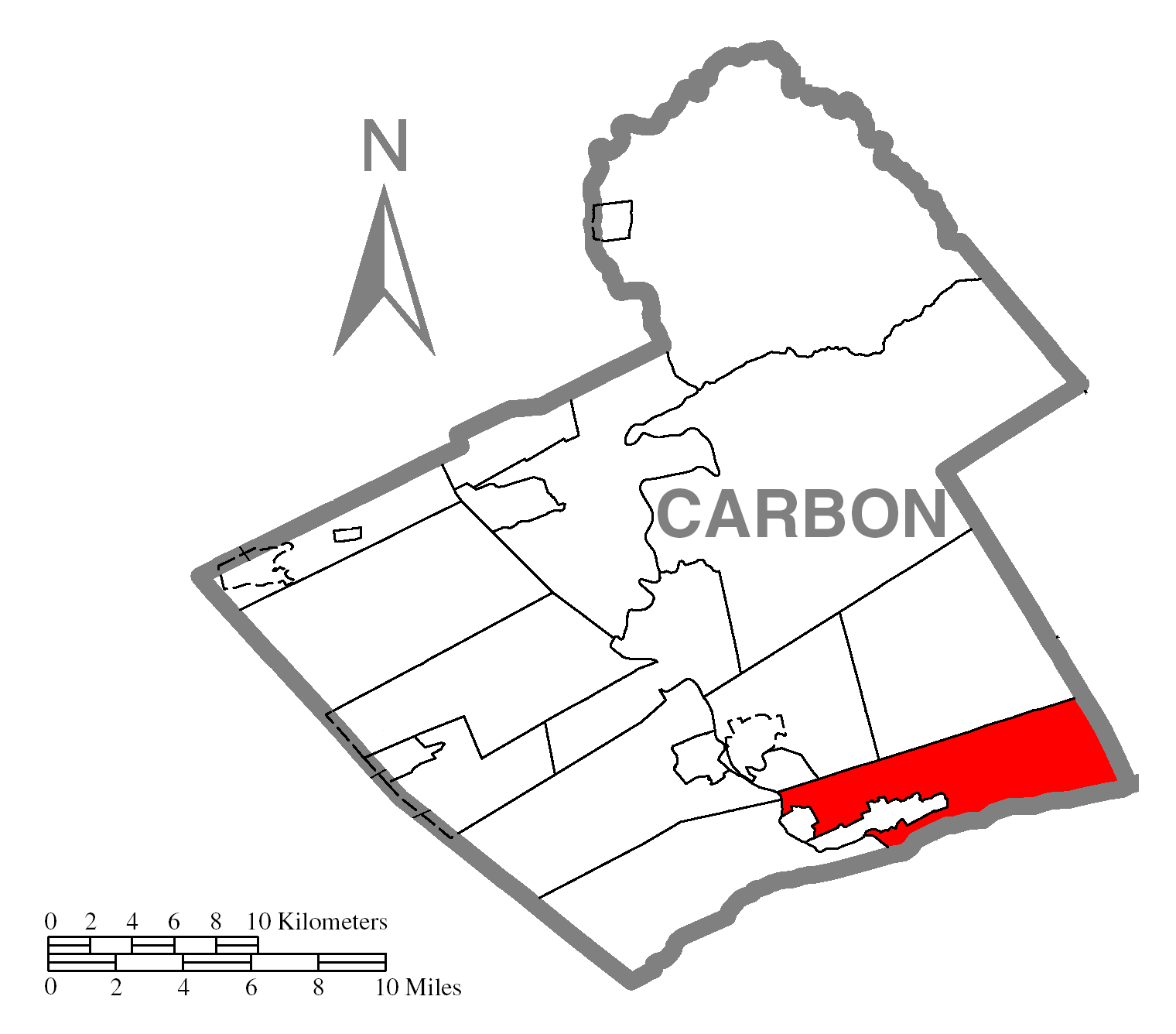
- Location of Lower Towamensing Township in Carbon County, Pennsylvania

- Location of Carbon County in Pennsylvania
- Coordinates: 40°48′00″N 75°37′31″W
- Country: United States
- State: Pennsylvania
- County: Carbon

Area
  - Total: 21.30 sq mi (55.17 km^{2})
  - Land: 21.25 sq mi (55.05 km^{2})
  - Water: 0.046 sq mi (0.12 km^{2})
- Elevation: 449 ft (137 m)

Population (2010)
  - Total: 3,228
  - Estimate (2016): 3,168
  - Density: 149.1/sq mi (57.55/km^{2})
- Time zone: UTC-5 (EST)
  - Summer (DST): UTC-4 (EDT)
- Area code: 610
- FIPS code: 42-025-45128
- Website: www.lowertowamensing.org

Lower Towamensing Township is a township in Carbon County, Pennsylvania. It is part of Northeastern Pennsylvania. The Lenape Indian tribe name is eponymous and was once applied by the natives to the whole region of Carbon County and bits of the Poconos to the north (Luzerne County) and to Schuylkill County (southwest). The population was 3,228 at the 2010 census.

== History ==
The Aquashicola Volunteer Fire Department has been serving the township for numerous years. The Little Gap Covered Bridge was added to the National Register of Historic Places in 1980.

== Geography ==
The township is in southeastern Carbon County and is bordered by Northampton County to the south and Monroe County to the east. According to the United States Census Bureau, the township has a total area of 21.30 square miles (55.17 km^{2}), of which 21.25 square miles (55.05 km^{2}) is land and 0.05 square miles (0.12 km^{2}), or 0.21%, is water. It is drained by tributaries (Aquashicola Creek, etc.) of the Lehigh River which separates it from East Penn Township, and its southern geographic boundary is Blue Mountain.

Villages in the township include Aquashicola (locally pronounced "ack-wa-SHIK-la"), Christian Corner, Hazard, and Little Gap (which hosts the Blue Mountain Resort). Pennsylvania Route 248 passes through the westernmost parts of the township, following the Lehigh River, and connects Lehighton to the northwest with the Allentown–Bethlehem area to south, as well as having nearby interchanges in Palmerton and Bowmanstown.

=== Neighboring municipalities ===
- Palmerton (southwest)
- Bowmanstown (southwest)
- East Penn Township (west and southwest)
- Mahoning Township (west)
- Parryville (northwest)
- Franklin Township (northwest)
- Towamensing Township (north)
- Eldred Township, Monroe County (east)
- Moore Township, Northampton County (southeast)
- Lehigh Township, Northampton County (south)
- Washington Township, Lehigh County (tangent to the southwest)

=== Climate ===
The township has a humid continental climate (Dfa/Dfb) and the hardiness zone is 6a except along the river and the Aquashicola Creek where it is 6b. Average monthly temperatures in Aquashicola range from 28.3 °F in January to 73.3 °F in July.

== Demographics ==
Historical population
Census	Pop.	Note	%±
2010	3,228		—
2016 (est.)	3,168		−1.9%
U.S. Decennial Census

As of the census of 2000, there were 3,173 people, 1,207 households, and 900 families residing in the township. The population density was 150.4 people per square mile (58.1/km^{2}). There were 1,296 housing units at an average density of 61.4/sq mi (23.7/km^{2}). The racial makeup of the township was 98.74% White, 0.13% Native American, 0.06% Asian, 0.44% from other races, and 0.63% from two or more races. Hispanic or Latino of any race were 1.04% of the population.

There were 1,207 households, out of which 31.0% had children under the age of 18 living with them, 64.0% were married couples living together, 7.0% had a female householder with no husband present, and 25.4% were non-families. 19.2% of all households were made up of individuals, and 8.7% had someone living alone who was 65 years of age or older. The average household size was 2.61 and the average family size was 2.99.

In the township the population was spread out, with 22.9% under the age of 18, 7.5% from 18 to 24, 31.1% from 25 to 44, 24.5% from 45 to 64, and 14.0% who were 65 years of age or older. The median age was 39 years. For every 100 females there were 100.3 males. For every 100 females age 18 and over, there were 100.2 males.

The median income for a household in the township was $36,414, and the median income for a family was $40,855. Males had a median income of $32,113 versus $23,654 for females. The per capita income for the township was $16,878. About 6.5% of families and 8.3% of the population were below the poverty line, including 13.0% of those under age 18 and 5.9% of those age 65 or over.

== Government ==
Lower Towamensing Township is governed by a three-member Board of Supervisors, who meet once a month at the township building. The Board of Supervisors serves as the legislative and executive body of the township. As of 2021, the Board of Supervisors consists of Chairman Brent M. Green, Vice Chairman Jay Mullikin, and Supervisor Connie Brown.

== Transportation ==
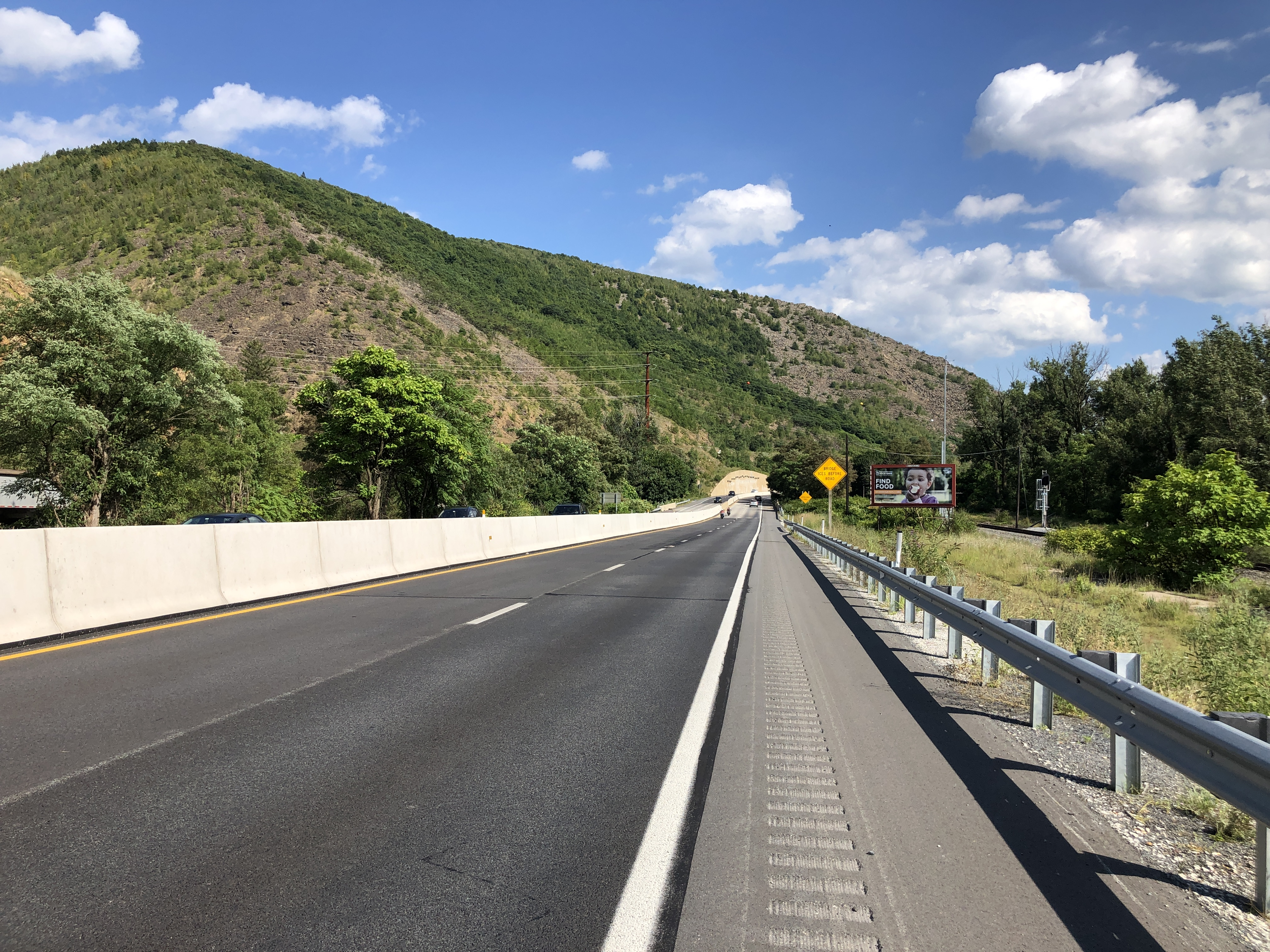
PA 248 eastbound in Lower Towamensing Township

As of 2010, there were 52.66 miles (84.75 km) of public roads in Lower Towamensing Township, of which 24.01 miles (38.64 km) were maintained by the Pennsylvania Department of Transportation (PennDOT) and 28.65 miles (46.11 km) were maintained by the township.

Pennsylvania Route 248 passes through Lower Towamensing Township, following a northwest–southeast alignment through the southwestern portion of the township parallel to the Lehigh River.

== Notable residents ==
- Elisha Marshall, brevet brigadier general for the Union Army in the American Civil War
