= George Kinek =

American football player (1929–1995)

No. 47
- Position: End

Personal information
- Born: January 13, 1929; Palmerton, Pennsylvania, U.S.
- Died: January 21, 1995 (aged 66); Salisbury Township, Pennsylvania, U.S.
- Listed height: 6 ft 2 in (1.88 m)
- Listed weight: 190 lb (86 kg)

Career information
- High school: Allentown (PA) Central Catholic
- College: Tulane
- NFL draft: 1951: 4th round, 48th overall pick

Career history
- Chicago Cardinals (1954)

Career NFL statistics
- Interceptions: 2
- Stats at Pro Football Reference

George Kinek (January 13, 1929 – January 21, 1995) was an American professional football end.

== Early life and education ==
Kinek was born in Palmerton, Pennsylvania, on January 13, 1929. He attended Allentown Central Catholic High School in Allentown, Pennsylvania and college at Tulane University in New Orleans.

== Career ==
Kinek was drafted by the Los Angeles Rams in the 4th round (48th overall) of the 1951 NFL Draft. He played for the Chicago Cardinals in 1954.

== Death ==
He died on January 21, 1995, in Salisbury Township, Pennsylvania, at age 67.
