= Forest Inn, Pennsylvania =

Unincorporated community in Pennsylvania, US

- Unincorporated community
- Location within Pennsylvania
- Coordinates: 40°51′32″N 75°35′36″W
- Country: United States
- State: Pennsylvania
- County: Carbon
- Township: Towamensing
- Elevation: 1,010 ft (310 m)
- Time zone: UTC-5 (Eastern (EST))
  - Summer (DST): UTC-4 (EDT)
- ZIP code: 18235
- Area codes: 610 and 484

Forest Inn is a village located in Carbon County, Pennsylvania, south of Beltzville Lake. The Country Junction retail store is located in the village.

Forest Inn uses the Lehighton ZIP code of 18235 and is located on U.S. Route 209.
