= Palmerton Historic District =

Historic district in Pennsylvania, United States

- U.S. National Register of Historic Places
- U.S. Historic district
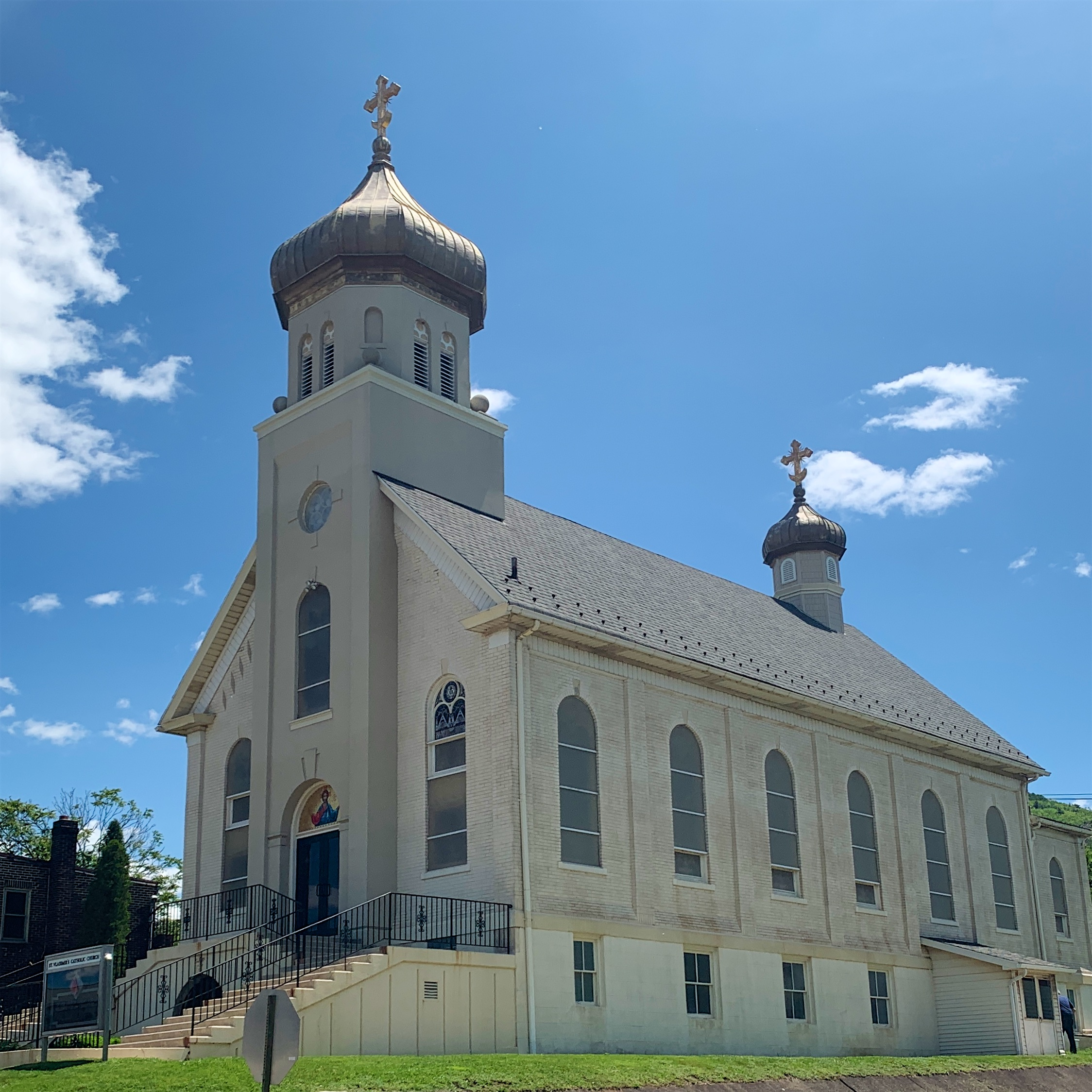
- St. Vladimmir Church

- Location within Pennsylvania Location within the United States
- Location: Roughly bounded by Avenue A, Harvard Avenue, 8th & Tomb Streets; Palmerton, Pennsylvania
- Coordinates: 40°48′14″N 75°36′32″W
- Area: 1,200 acres (490 ha)
- Built: 1898
- Architect: William Stone; Henry Janeway Hardenbergh; Don and Demming
- Architectural style: Colonial Revival, Tudor Revival, Bungalow
- NRHP reference No.: 13000743
- Added to NRHP: January 19, 2018

The Palmerton Historic District is a national historic district located in Palmerton, Carbon County, Pennsylvania. Bordered roughly by Tomb Street, Avenue A, 8th Street, and Harvard Avenue, it encompasses 1,262 contributing buildings, seven contributing structures (five railroad bridges, one road bridge, and one park gazebo), and four contributing sites (three parks and a cemetery), as well as 475 noncontributing buildings and 13 noncontributing sites where previously demolished resources had been located. Usage functions range from commercial and industrial to institutional to residential in nature. This district was added to the National Register of Historic Places on January 19, 2018 in recognition of its significance in community planning and development.

== History and notable architecture ==
The Palmerton Historic District in Palmerton, Pennsylvania was officially established on January 19, 2018 with its listing on the National Register of Historic Places. Encompassing contributing structures which are notable for their significance to the region's planning and development, as well as multiple noncontributing structures, this district is bordered roughly by Harvard Avenue, 8th Street, Avenue A, and Tomb Street, and includes commercial, industrial, institutional, and residential properties.

It is an historically important district, according to historic preservationist Shelby Weaver Splain, because the section of Palmerton included in this district "was designed and laid out under the direction of Stephen Squires Palmer, President of the New Jersey Zinc Company," enabling Palmerton to become "a significant planned community built by the company to house its workers." The earliest construction in this district began in 1890 and extended, roughly, through 1962.

=== Contributing structures and sites ===
Included in the Palmerton Historic District are 1,262 contributing buildings, three parks and a cemetery which have been designated as contributing sites, and five railroad bridges, one road bridge, and one park gazebo which have been designated as contributing structures.

Notable buildings include St. John's Episcopal Church and the Stephen S. Palmer School, which are both located on Lafayette Avenue, and the Living Hope Lighthouse Church on 3rd Street.

== Gallery ==
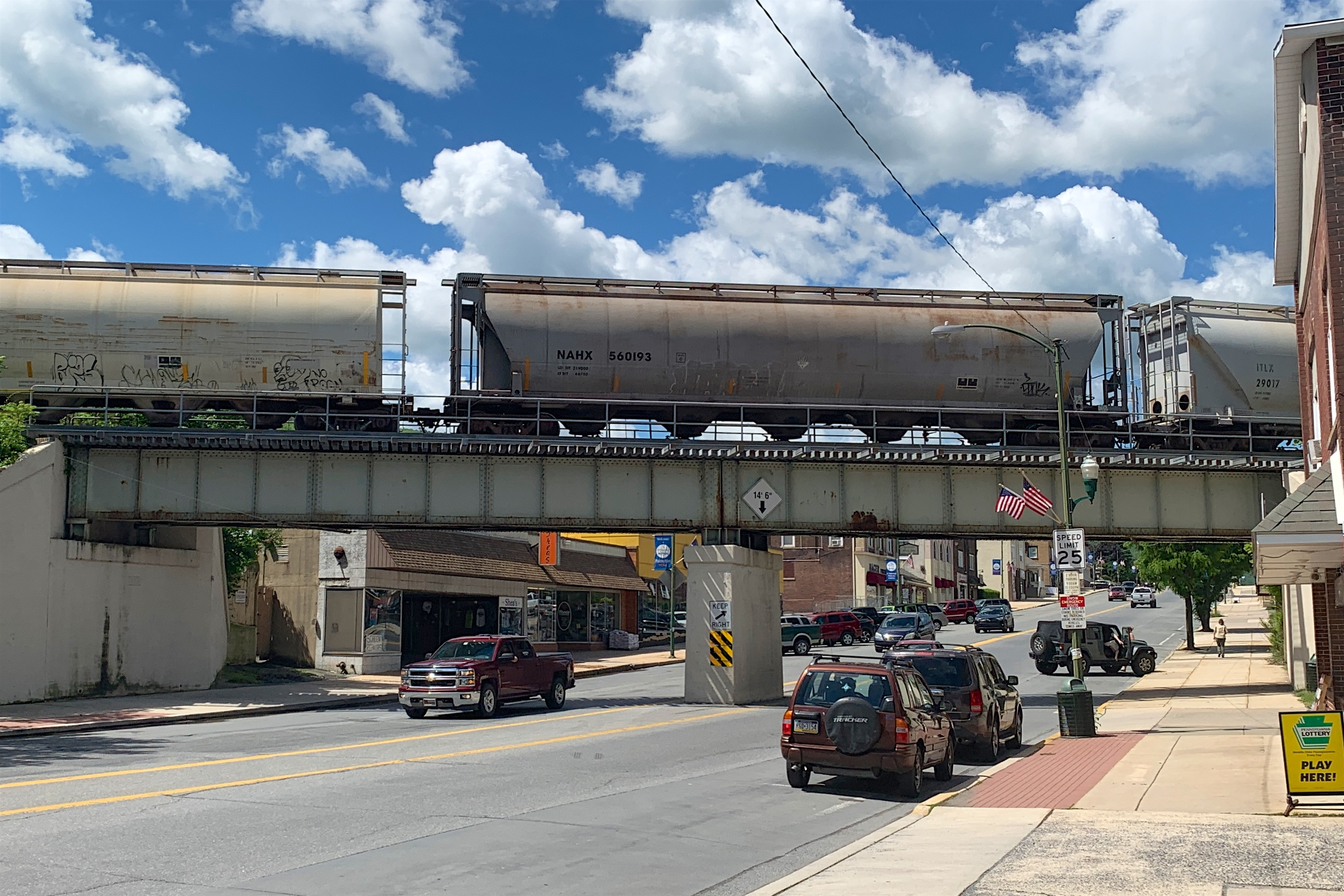
Delaware Avenue in downtown Palmerton

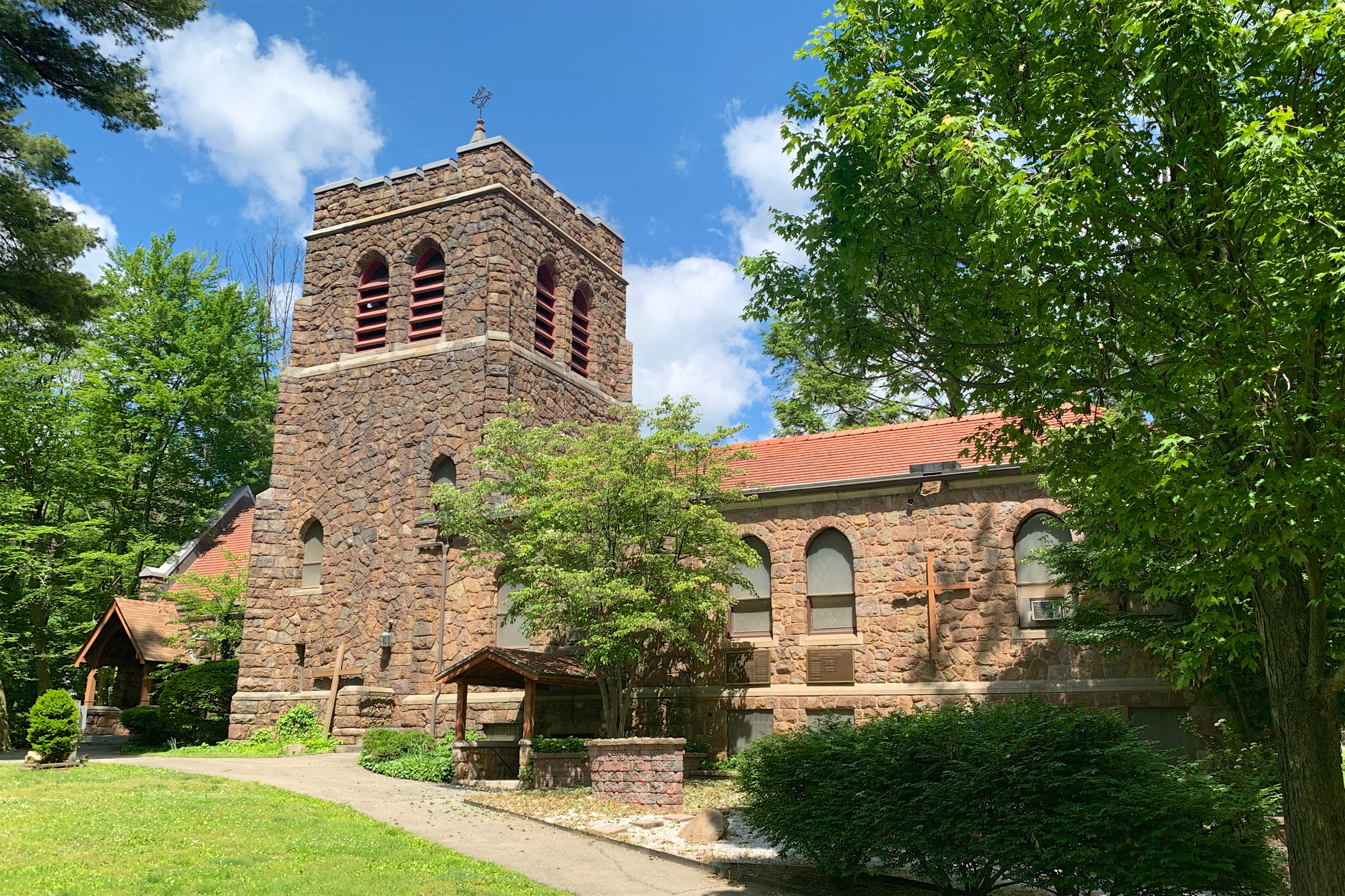
St. John's Episcopal Church

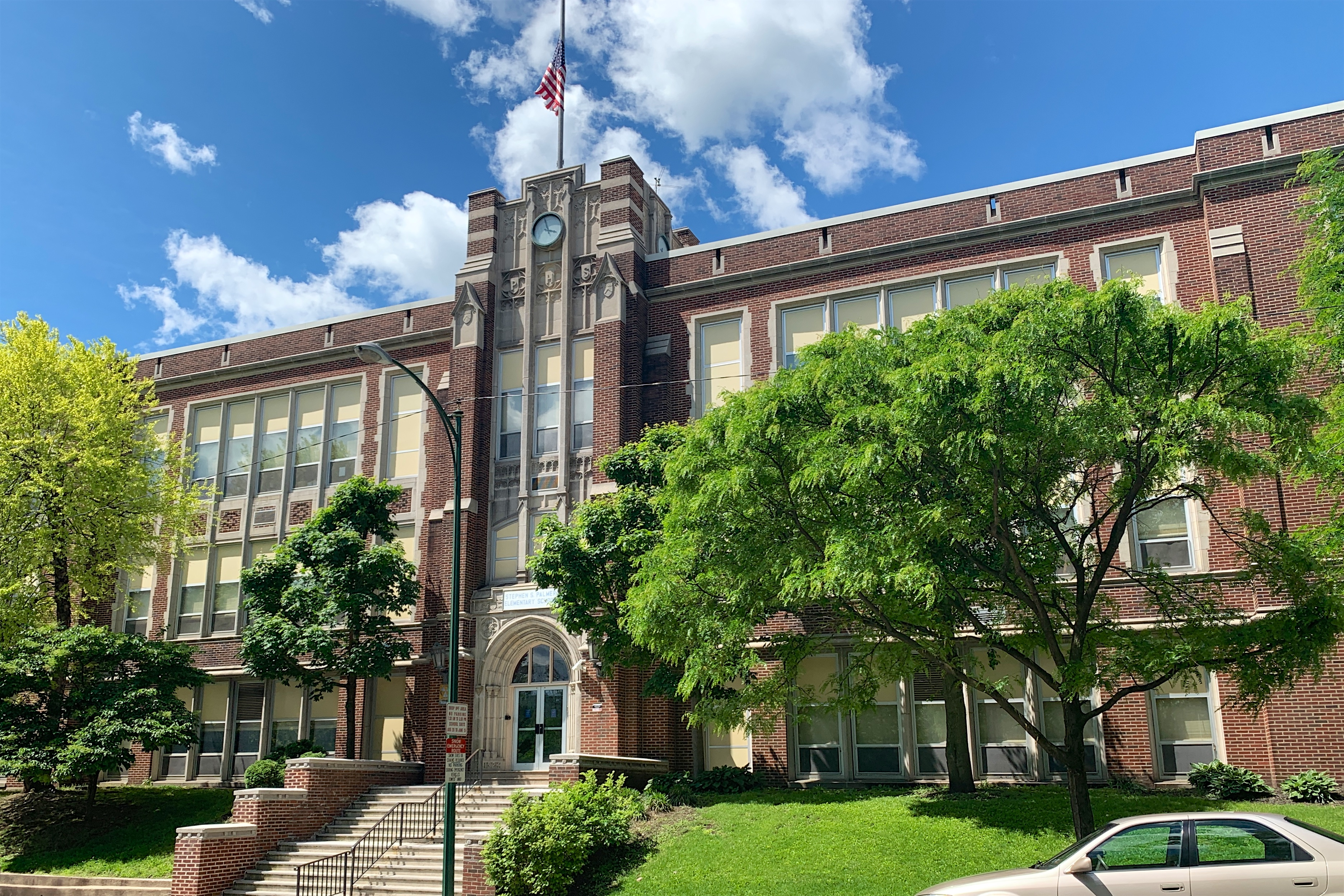
Stephen S. Palmer School

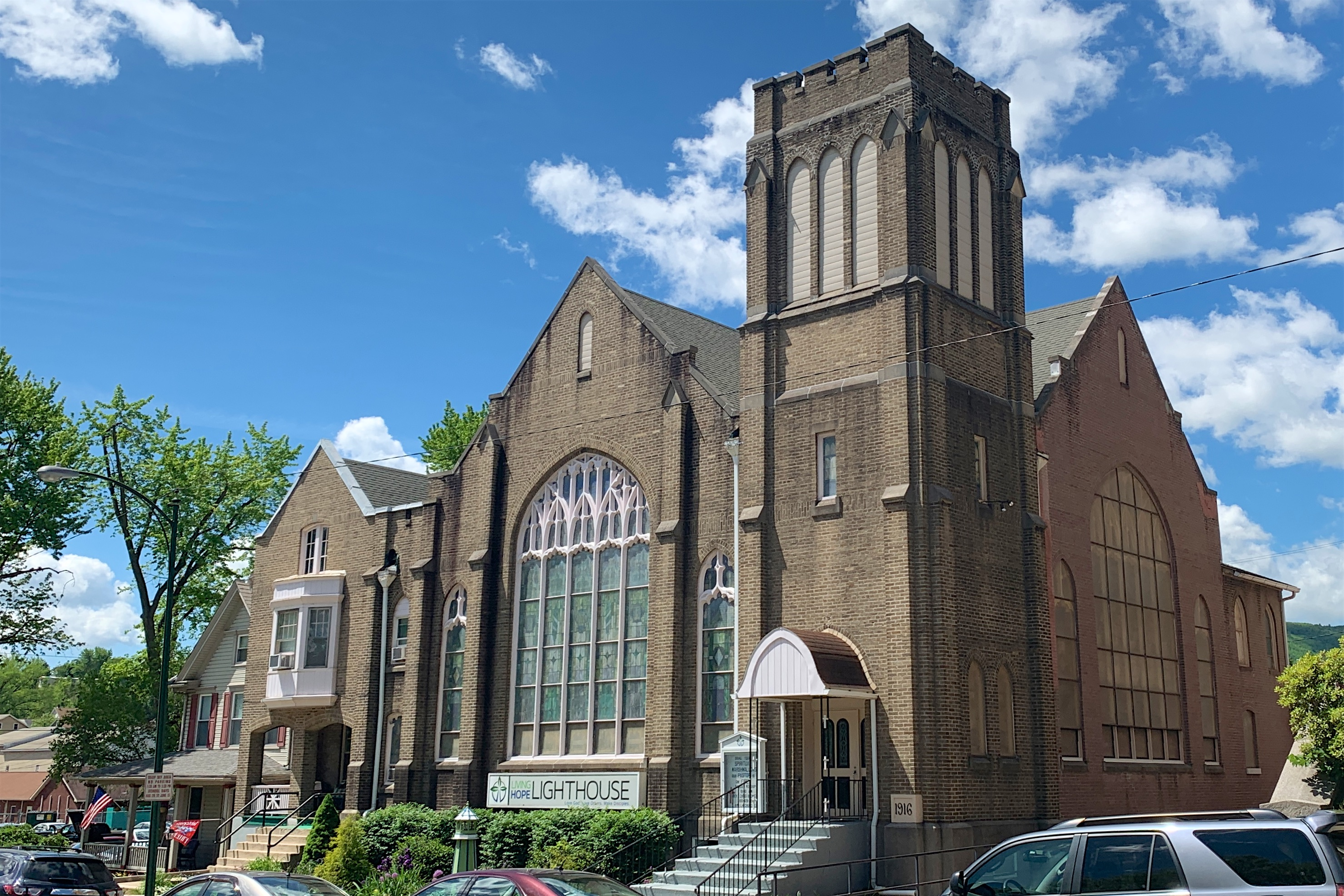
Living Hope Lighthouse Church
