= Little Gap Covered Bridge =

- U.S. National Register of Historic Places
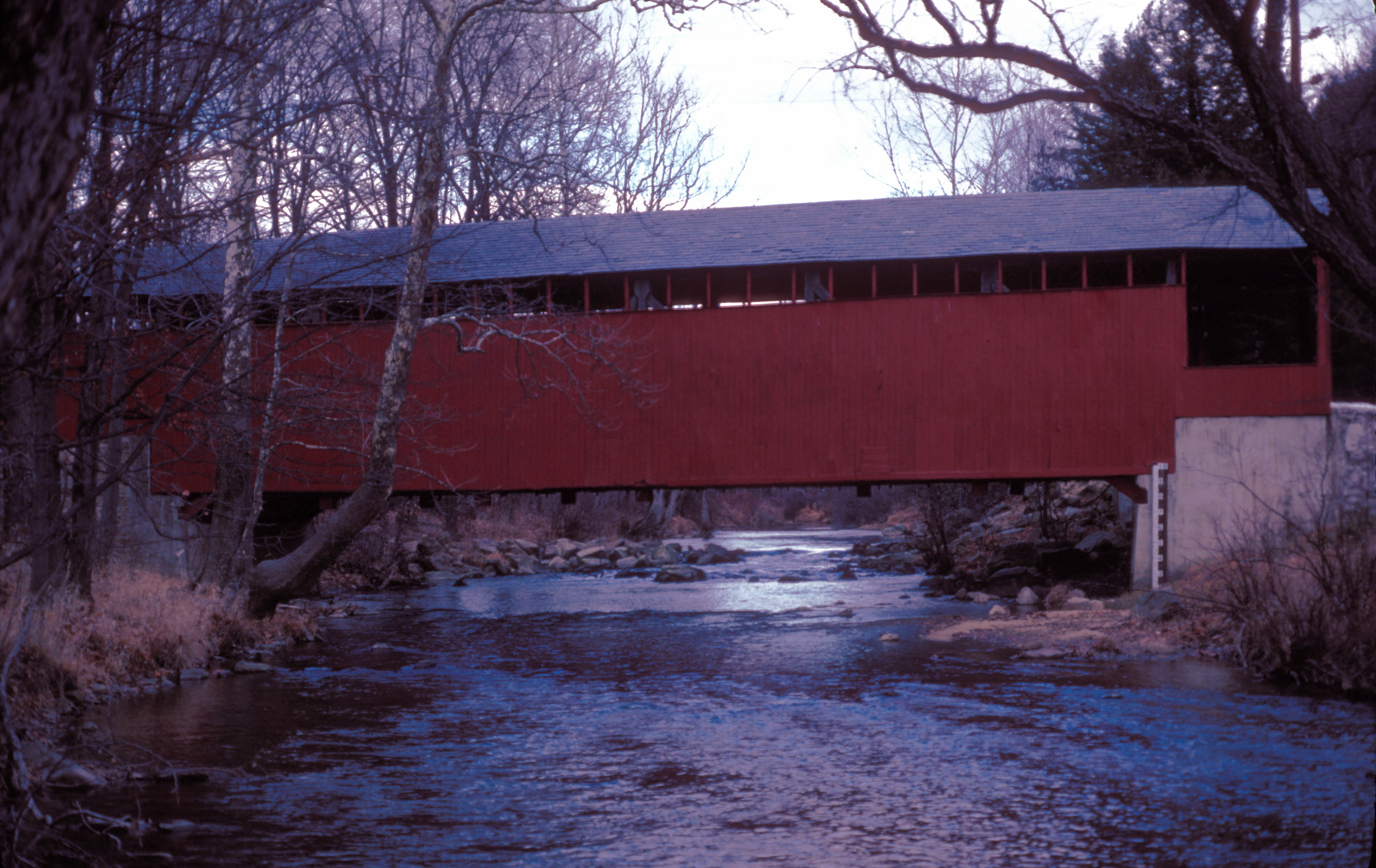
- Little Gap Covered Bridge in February 1971

- Location within Pennsylvania Location within the United States
- Location: S of Little Gap on T 376, Lower Towamensing Township, Pennsylvania
- Coordinates: 40°49′52″N 75°31′22″W
- Area: 0.1 acres (0.040 ha)
- Built: c. 1860
- Architectural style: Burr truss
- MPS: Covered Bridges of the Delaware River Watershed TR
- NRHP reference No.: 80004294
- Added to NRHP: December 01, 1980

The Little Gap Covered Bridge is a historic covered bridge that is located near Little Gap in Lower Towamensing Township, Carbon County, Pennsylvania, United States.

== History and architectural features ==
Built circa 1860, this historic structure is a seventy-three-foot, Burr Truss-span that crosses the Buckwah Creek. The bridge incorporated elements of the Howe truss in its construction.

A nearby restaurant, the "Covered Bridge Inn," takes its name from the bridge. In 2011, the bridge was damaged by a hit and run driver.
