= Towamensing Township, Pennsylvania =

Township in Pennsylvania, US

Towamensing Township
- Township
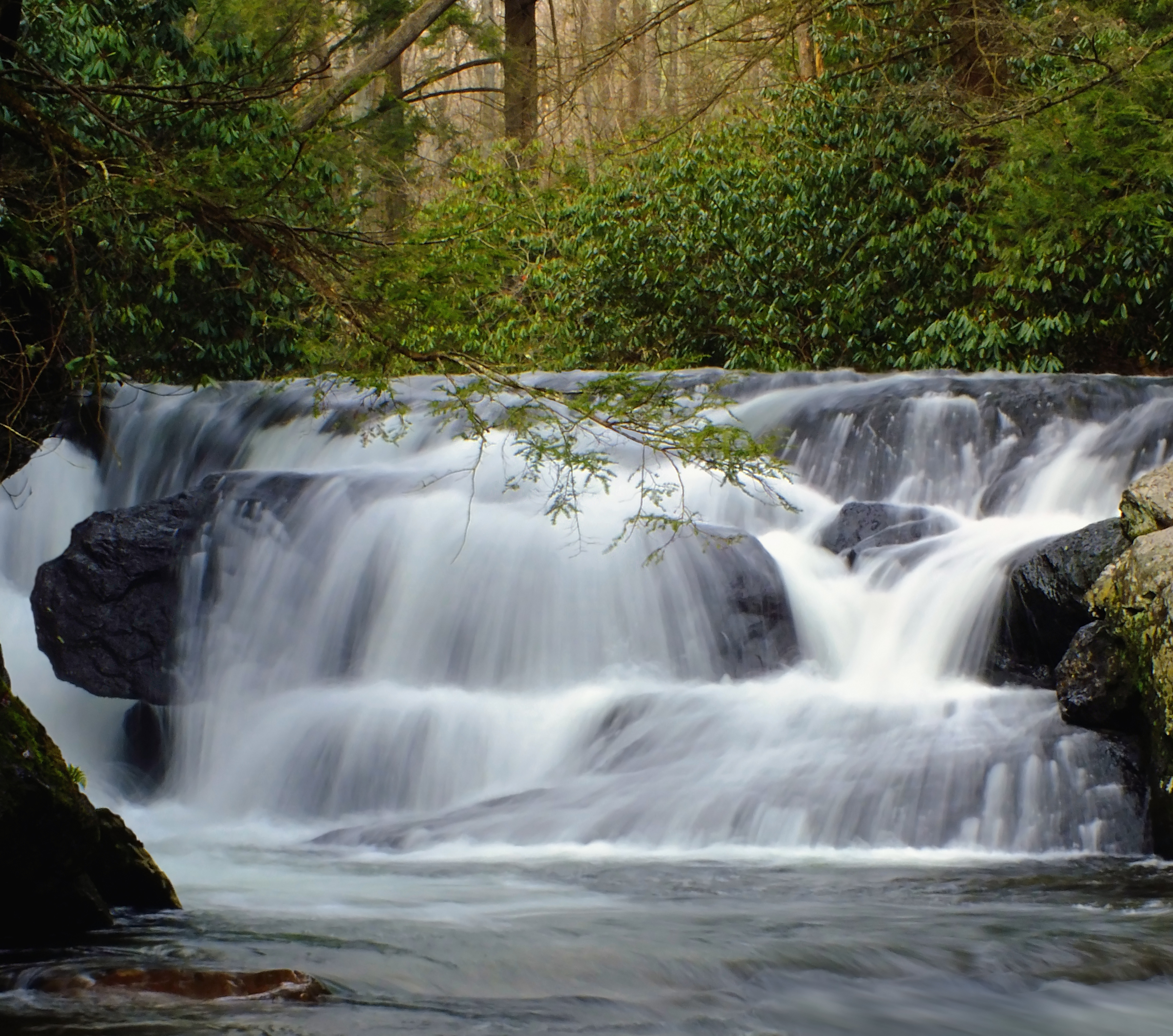
- Wild Creek Falls in Beltzville State Park

- Logo

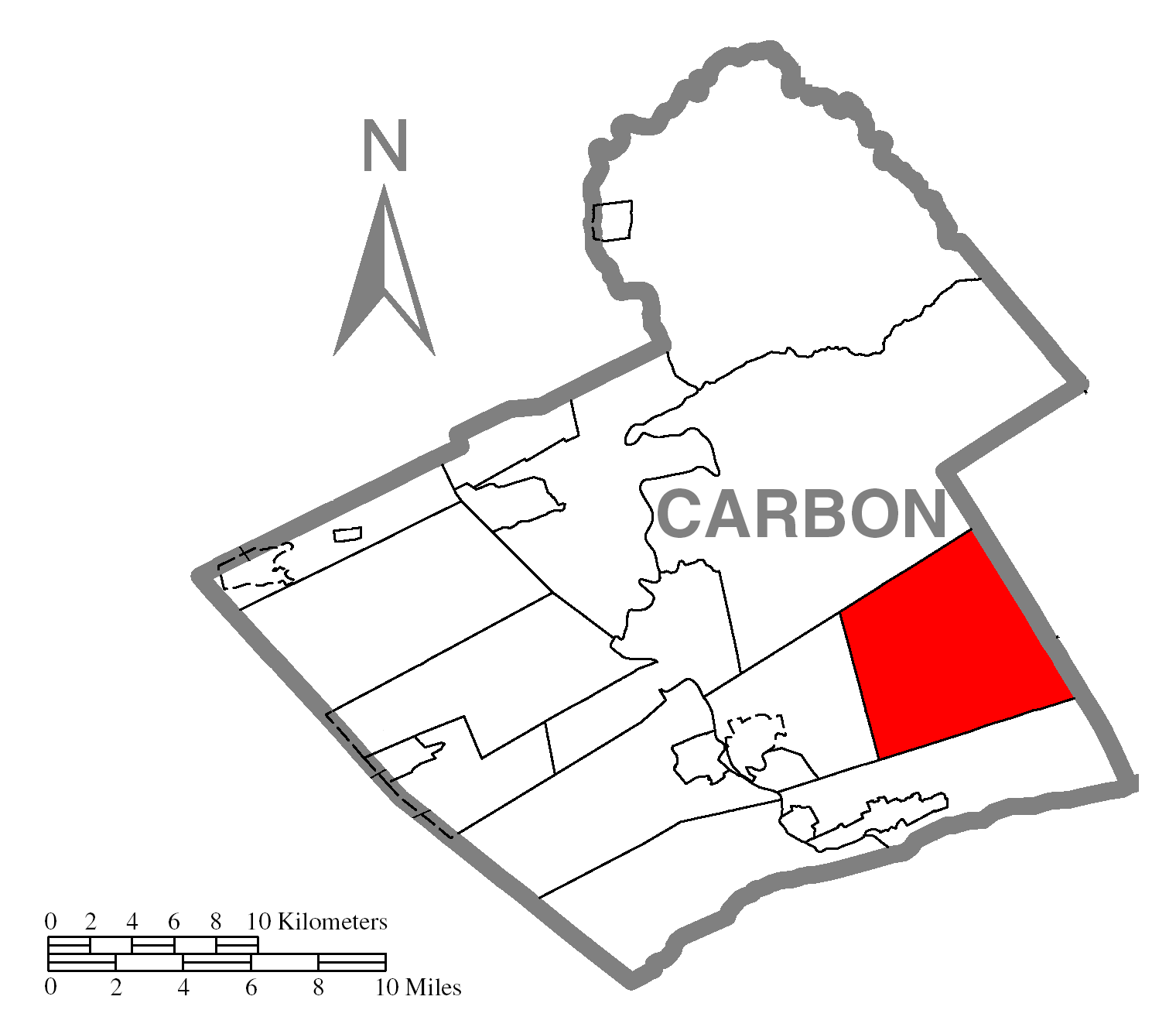
- Location of Towamensing Township in Carbon County, Pennsylvania

- Location of Carbon County in Pennsylvania
- Coordinates: 40°52′29″N 75°37′30″W
- Country: United States
- State: Pennsylvania
- County: Carbon

Area
  - Total: 28.92 sq mi (74.89 km^{2})
  - Land: 27.14 sq mi (70.28 km^{2})
  - Water: 1.78 sq mi (4.61 km^{2})
- Elevation: 715 ft (218 m)

Population (2010)
  - Total: 4,477
  - Estimate (2016): 4,409
  - Density: 162.5/sq mi (62.73/km^{2})
- Time zone: UTC-5 (EST)
  - Summer (DST): UTC-4 (EDT)
- Area code: 610
- FIPS code: 42-025-77160
- Website: towamensingtownship.com

Towamensing Township is a lightly populated rural township in eastern Carbon County, Pennsylvania. It is part of Northeastern Pennsylvania.

The Lenape Indian tribe's name is eponymous and was once applied by the natives to the whole region of Carbon County and bits of the Poconos to the north (Luzerne County) and to Schuylkill County (southwest). The population was 4,477 at the 2010 census, up from 3,475 at the 2000 census. A portion of Beltzville State Park is in the township.

The film franchise Hell House, LLC was filmed in Towamensing Township at the fictitious Abaddon Hotel, which in reality is the Waldorf Estate of Fear haunted house attraction located on Route 209.

== Geography ==
Towamensing Township is in southeastern Carbon County and is bordered by Monroe County to the east. According to the U.S. Census Bureau, the township has a total area of 28.9 square miles (74.9 km^{2}), 27.1 square miles (70.3 km^{2}) of which is land and 1.8 square miles (4.6 km^{2}), or 6.15%, of which is water. It is drained by Aquashicola Creek and Pohopoco Creek into the Lehigh River. The township's northern boundary runs along the base of Call Mountain. Its villages include Forest Inn, Jonesville, Stemlersville, and Trachsville.

=== Neighboring municipalities ===
- Lower Towamensing Township - (south)
- Franklin Township - (west-southwest)
- Penn Forest Township - (north)
- Polk Township, Monroe County - (northeast)
- Eldred Township, Monroe County - (southeast)

=== Climate ===
The township has a humid continental climate (Dfa/Dfb) and the hardiness zone is 6a. Average monthly temperatures in Forest Inn range from in 27.0 °F in January to 71.2 °F in July.

== Demographics ==
Historical population
Census	Pop.	Note	%±
2000	3,475		—
2010	4,477		28.8%
2016 (est.)	4,409		−1.5%
U.S. Decennial Census

As of the 2000 census, there were 3,475 people, 1,275 households, and 1,003 families residing in the township. The population density was 128.6 people per square mile (49.7 people/km^{2}). There were 1,458 housing units at an average density of 54.0 per square mile (20.8/km^{2}). The racial makeup of the township was 98.65% White, 0.43% African American, 0.09% Native American, 0.23% Asian, 0.17% from other races, and 0.43% from two or more races. Hispanic or Latino of any race were 1.24% of the population.

There were 1,275 households, out of which 34.4% had children under the age of 18 living with them, 69.3% were married couples living together, 5.2% had a female householder with no husband present, and 21.3% were non-families. 15.8% of all households were made up of individuals, and 6.2% had someone living alone who was 65 years of age or older. The average household size was 2.71 and the average family size was 3.03.

In the township, the population was spread out, with 24.1% under the age of 18, 5.6% from 18 to 24, 30.9% from 25 to 44, 26.1% from 45 to 64, and 13.3% who were 65 years of age or older. The median age was 40 years. For every 100 females, there were 100.4 males. For every 100 females age 18 and over, there were 100.1 males.

The median income for a household in the township was $49,524, and the median income for a family was $51,135. Males had a median income of $36,638 versus $21,103 for females. The per capita income for the township was $19,629. About 4.5% of families and 4.7% of the population were below the poverty line, including 5.6% of those under age 18 and 6.7% of those age 65 or over.

== Transportation ==
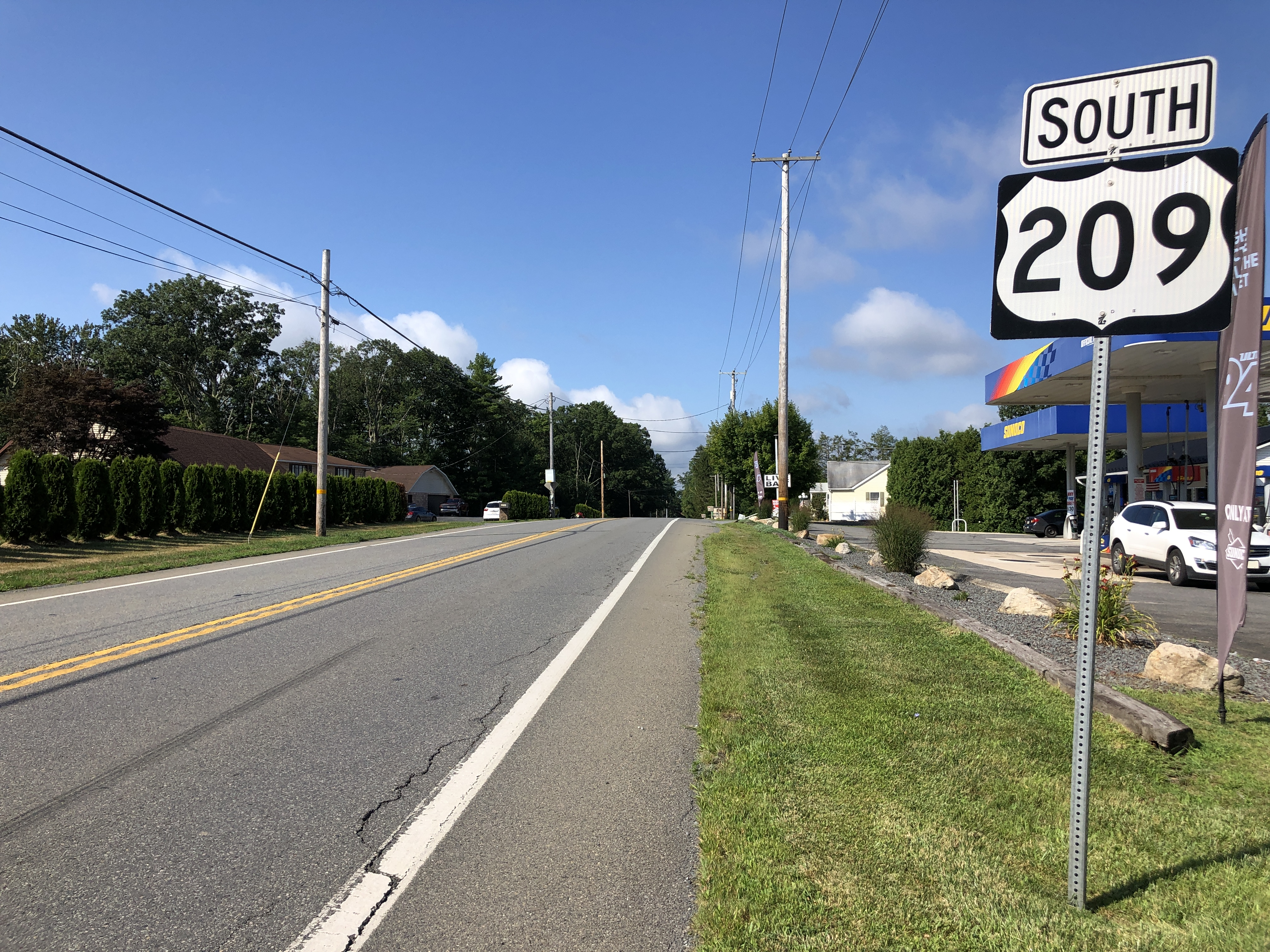
US Route 209 southbound in Towamensing Township

As of 2020, there were 84.98 miles (136.76 km) of public roads in Penn Forest Township, of which 17.17 miles (27.63 km) were maintained by the Pennsylvania Department of Transportation (PennDOT) and 67.81 miles (109.13 km) were maintained by the township.

U.S. Route 209 is the only numbered highway passing through Towamensing Township. It crosses from northeast-to-southwest on the southeast side of Beltzville Lake.
