= Donald R. F. Harleman =

Donald Robert Fergusson Harleman (December 5, 1922 – September 28, 2005) was an American civil engineer noted for his research of the flow of contaminants through water and harbor cleanup efforts around the world. Harleman was credited with cleanup efforts of harbors around the world: Australia, Brazil, China, India, and Mexico, among others. He advised government agencies on the Boston Harbor cleanup. Harleman was elected to the National Academy of Engineering in 1974 "for leadership in the development of theoretical and experimental techniques in the field of fluid mechanics". The Boston Globe called Harleman "an internationally recognized civil engineer in the field of water quality and waste treatment". The New York Times said that Harleman "was regarded as a leader in fluid mechanics" and said he was "water pollution expert who aided cleanups worldwide". Harleman was Ford Professor of Civil Engineering and Director of Ralph M. Parsons Laboratory at the Massachusetts Institute of Technology.

== Chronology ==
- 1922: born on December in Palmerton, Pennsylvania
- 1943: B.S. in civil engineering, Pennsylvania State University
- 1947: M.S., Massachusetts Institute of Technology
- 1950: Doctorate, Massachusetts Institute of Technology
- 1950: assistant professor of hydraulics, Massachusetts Institute of Technology
- 1975-1990: Ford Professor of Environmental Engineering, Massachusetts Institute of Technology
- 1991: retired from MIT as Ford Professor emeritus
- 2005: died of cancer on September 28 on Nantucket, Massachusetts
