= Blue Mountain Resort =

Ski area in Pennsylvania, United States

Blue Mountain
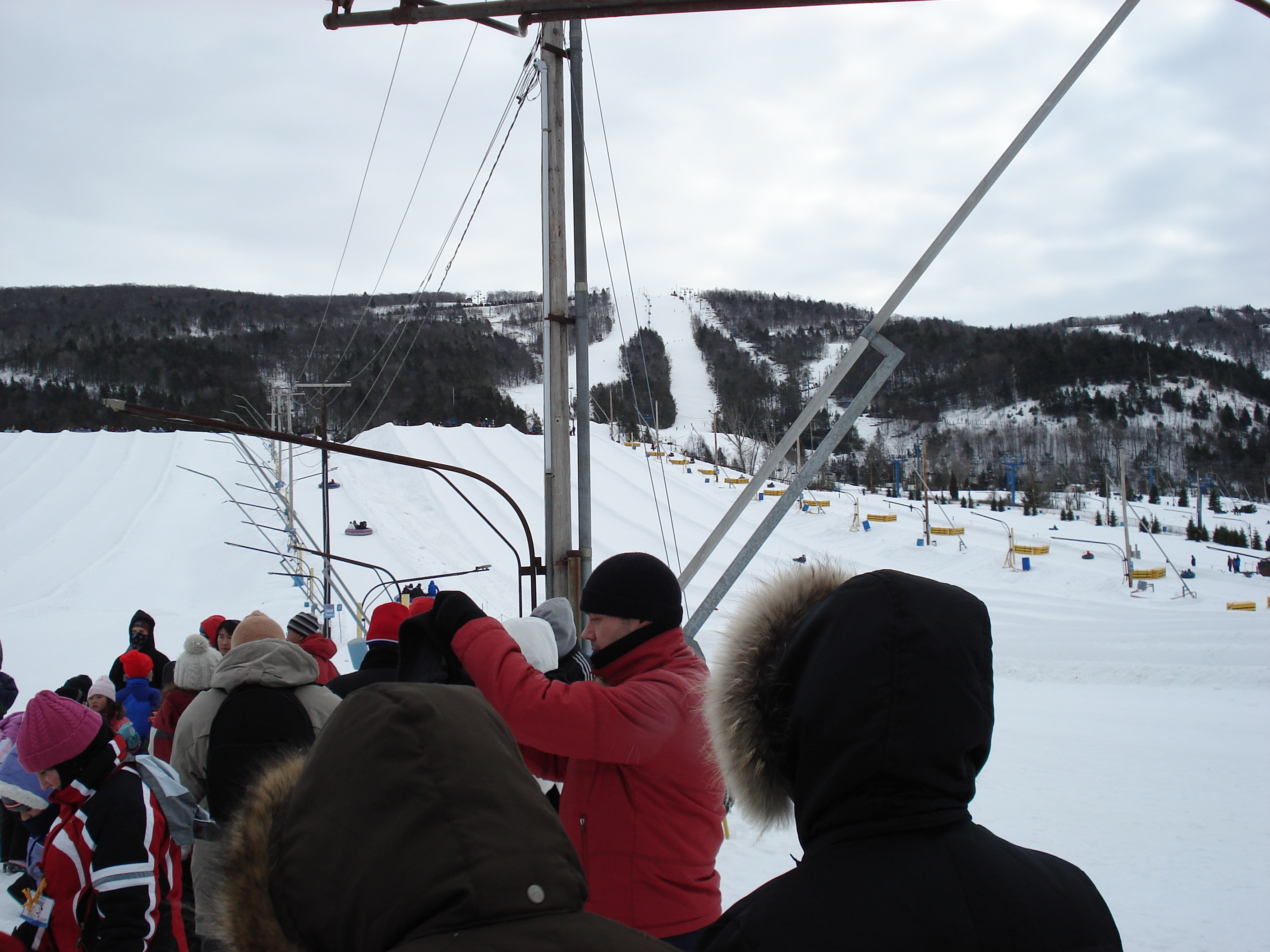
- Blue Mountain Resort in Carbon County, Pennsylvania in February 2007
- Interactive map of Blue Mountain
- Location: Lower Towamensing Township, Carbon County, Pennsylvania
- Nearest city: Palmerton, Pennsylvania
- Coordinates: 40°49′20″N 75°30′48″W
- Opened: 1977
- Vertical: 1,082 ft (330 m)
- Top elevation: 1,540 ft (470 m)
- Base elevation: 458 ft (140 m)
- Skiable area: 164 acres (0.66 km^{2})
- Trails: 40 total 14 easier 4 more difficult 12 most difficult 3 extremely difficult 7 terrain park (1 easier, 3 more difficult, 2 most difficult, 1 extremely difficult)
- Longest run: 6,400 ft (2,000 m)
- Lift system: 12 lifts: 1 triple chairlift 1 double chairlift 1 high-speed quad 2 high-speed six-pack 7 surface lifts
- Lift capacity: 13,500 skiers/hr
- Snowfall: 33 in (0.84 m)
- Snowmaking: 100%
- Night skiing: 100%
- Website: https://www.skibluemt.com/

Blue Mountain Resort is a ski resort located in Palmerton, Pennsylvania, United States. The resort is on Blue Mountain in the Lehigh Valley region of eastern Pennsylvania. It is owned by BMR Resort, a Denver-based firm affiliated with KSL Resorts, which took over the resort's management in May 2021.

== History ==
=== 20th century ===
The resort was opened by Ray Tuthill in 1977 as Little Gap Ski Area; he re-established it as Blue Mountain in 1989.

In 2002 and 2003, Blue Mountain added two advanced runs and a teaching hill with two beginner slopes, fed by a triple chairlift and a conveyor lift. In 2006, the resort added eastern Pennsylvania's first high-speed six-pack chairlift.

In 2007, Tuthill's daughter, Barbara Green, became the president and CEO of Blue Mountain.

In summer 2008, the resort implemented a $3.1 million upgrade for the 2008-2009 ski season. It included improvements to the resort's snowmaking equipment, a newly built dining facility, and the addition of a new intermediate trail between Razor's Edge and Paradise named Dreamweaver.

In 2018, Blue Mountain partnered with the United States Luge Association and created a natural luge, for the US Luge team to evaluate Olympic Candidates.

In 2019, Blue Mountain resort expanded its RFID access. As of December 2021, snowmaking was added.

A new six-pack chair known as Main Street Express replaced the Burma and Main St Chairs in 2022.

== The Mountain ==
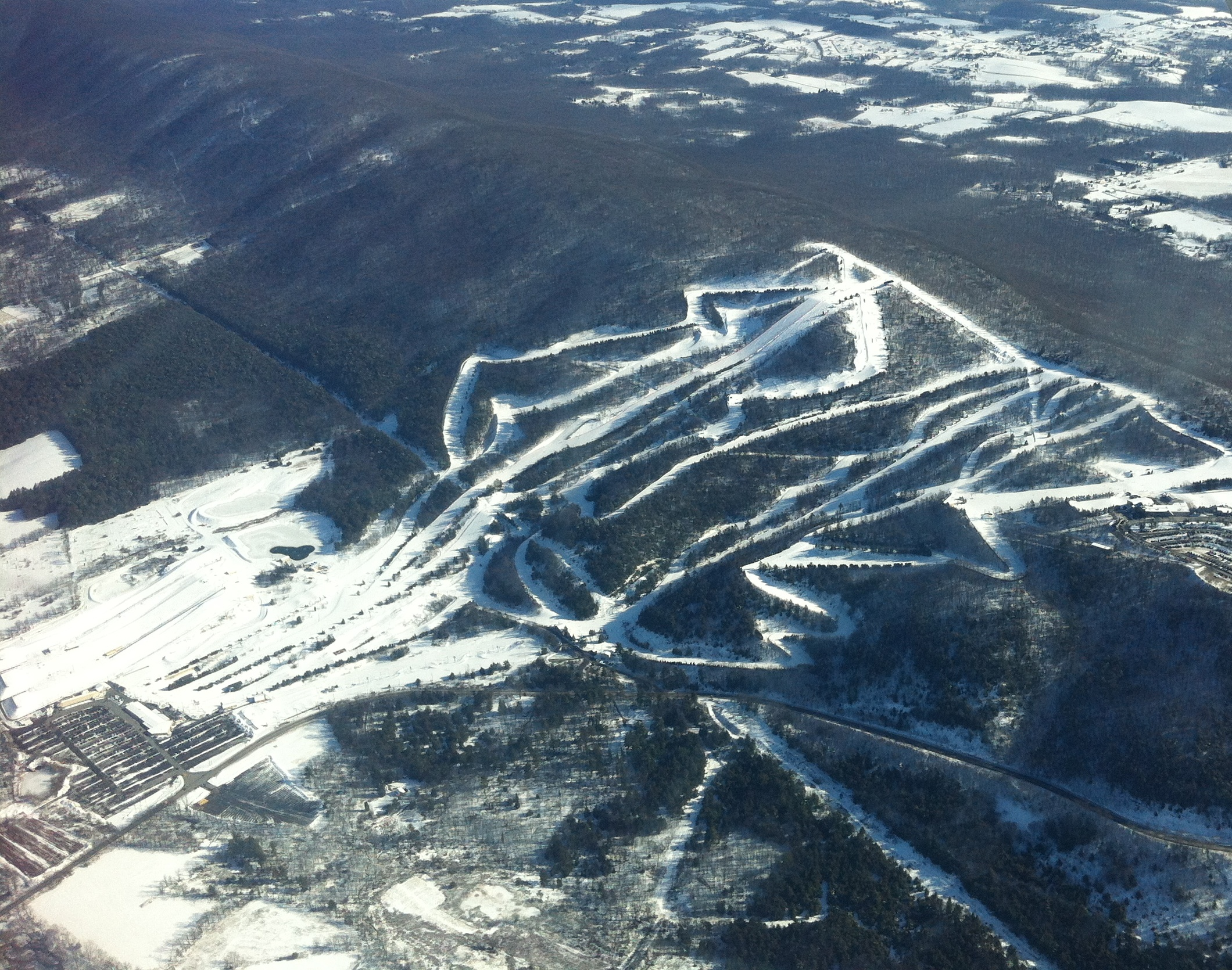
An aerial view of Blue Mountain Resort's ski area in February 2014

Blue Mountain has a summit elevation of 1,407 feet (429 m) and a vertical drop of 1,087 ft (331 m), the largest vertical drop of any ski resort in Pennsylvania. The summit is accessed by Comet high-speed quad, 2 six-person lifts(Challenge Express and Main St Express), or Vista double chair. A beginner trail and an intermediate trail run down the outer, eastern side of the north-facing slope. Four expert runs follow the chairlifts to the bottom, and an access trail connects the summit to the western half of the resort.

One double chairlift rises up the western side of the resort, accessing mixed novice, intermediate, and expert terrain. The main resort lodge, located at the top of the mountain, is accessible by road. A dedicated beginner section adjacent to the lodge is served by a double chair and one surface lift. A beginner trail, Burma Road, connects to the beginner section at the bottom of the hill. A second lodge and the resort's snow tubing facility are also located at the bottom of the mountain near the Valley Lodge.

The resort has a total of 40 slopes. Blue Mountain has glade trails, beginner through expert, various terrain park installations, and training slopes. Blue Mountain uses RFID ticket scanners at every lift. The mountain offers 46 snow tubing trails, each over 1,000 feet (300 m) long. It was the only ski resort in Pennsylvania to offer family-size tubes which have been replaced with figure 8 tubes as well as single tubes, with both day and night snow tubing.

There are five terrain parks, which include Terrain Run, Lower Sidewinder, Come Around Park, and Central Park. The longest trail is 6,400 feet (2,000 m) in length; the mountain has 164 acres (0.3 sq mi; 0.7 km^{2}) of skiable terrain. Although it receives an average of only 33 inches (840 mm) of natural snowfall per year, natural snow is supplemented with 100% snowmaking coverage.

The resort hosts an alpine ski race team consisting of more than 125 USSA competitors and 75 developmental competitors. Its ski patrol is featured in the reality series Ski Patrol. which aired on truTV in the 2008-2009 season.

== Climate ==
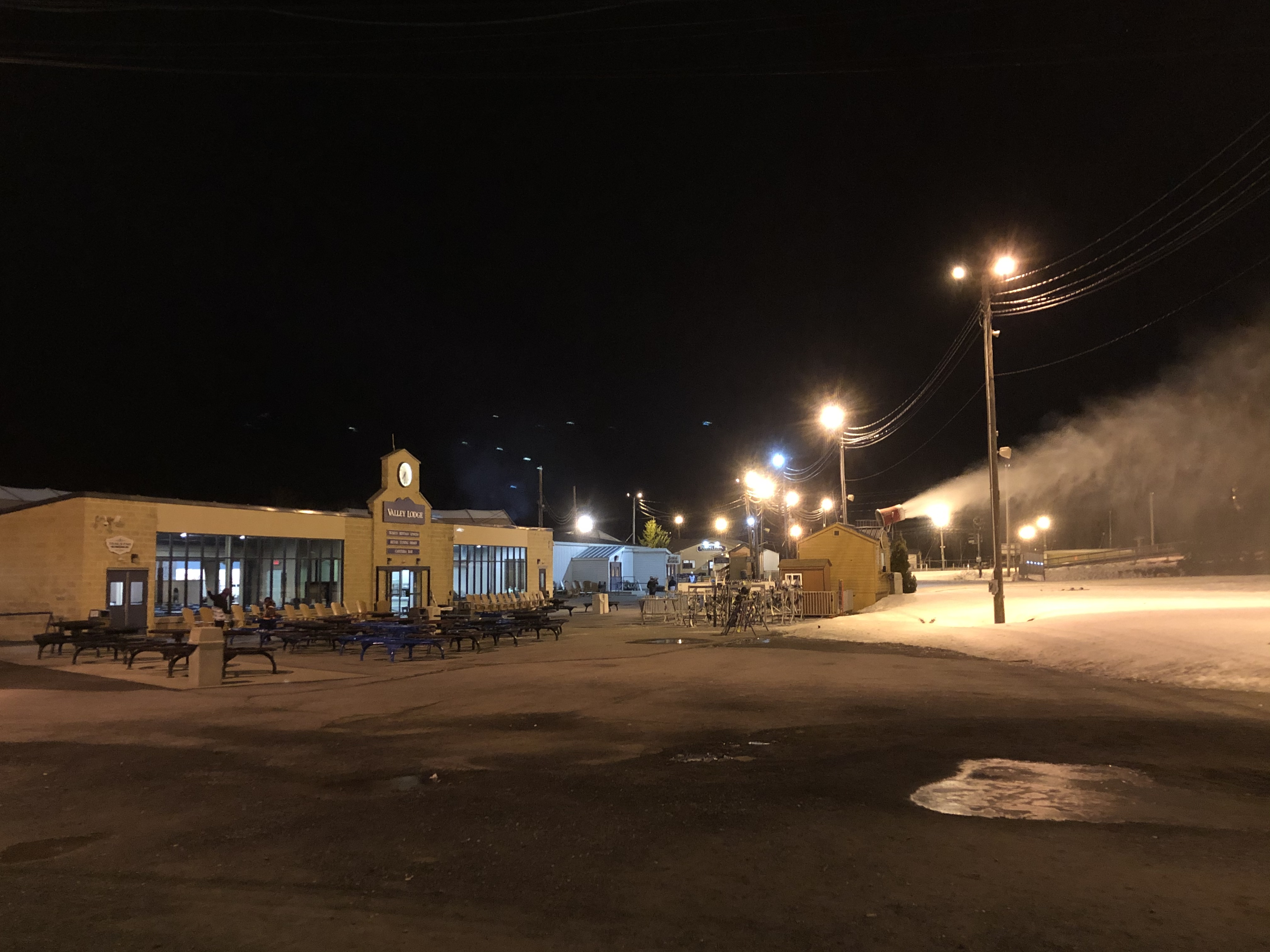
Valley Lodge at the resort at night with snow making machines running in January 2020

According to the Köppen climate classification system, Blue Mountain Ski Resort has a warm summer humid continental climate (Dfb). Dfb climates are characterized by at least one month having an average mean temperature ≤ 32.0 °F (0.0 °C), at least four months with an average mean temperature ≥ 50.0 °F (10.0 °C), all months with an average mean temperature ≤ 71.6 °F (22.0 °C) and no significant precipitation difference between seasons. Most summer days are slightly humid at Blue Mountain Ski Resort, and episodes of heat and high humidity can occur with heat index values > 98 °F (37 °C). Since 1981, the highest air temperature was 100.5 °F (38.1 °C) on 07/22/2011, and the highest daily average mean dew point was 73.8 °F (23.2 °C) on 08/01/2006. Since 1981, the wettest calendar day was 5.25 inches (133 mm) on September 30, 2010.

During winter months, the average annual extreme minimum air temperature is −7.0 °F (−21.7 °C). Since 1981, the coldest air temperature was −17.9 °F (−27.7 °C) on 01/21/1994. Episodes of extreme cold and wind can occur with wind chill values <−19 °F (−28 °C). Ice storms and large snowstorms depositing ≥ 12 inches (30 cm) of snow occur once every couple of years.

Climate data for Blue Mountain Ski Resort Sky Top Trail, Elevation 1,365 ft (416 m), 1981-2010 normals, extremes 1981-2018
Month	Jan	Feb	Mar	Apr	May	Jun	Jul	Aug	Sep	Oct	Nov	Dec	Year
Record high °F (°C)	67.4 (19.7)	75.9 (24.4)	84.8 (29.3)	90.6 (32.6)	92.8 (33.8)	93.7 (34.3)	100.5 (38.1)	96.8 (36.0)	94.8 (34.9)	87.5 (30.8)	78.3 (25.7)	70.6 (21.4)	100.5 (38.1)
Mean daily maximum °F (°C)	33.9 (1.1)	37.5 (3.1)	45.2 (7.3)	57.9 (14.4)	68.7 (20.4)	76.4 (24.7)	80.9 (27.2)	79.2 (26.2)	72.5 (22.5)	60.9 (16.1)	49.8 (9.9)	38.4 (3.6)	58.5 (14.7)
Daily mean °F (°C)	25.3 (−3.7)	28.4 (−2.0)	35.5 (1.9)	47.5 (8.6)	58.0 (14.4)	66.4 (19.1)	71.0 (21.7)	69.7 (20.9)	62.7 (17.1)	51.4 (10.8)	41.3 (5.2)	30.6 (−0.8)	49.1 (9.5)
Mean daily minimum °F (°C)	16.7 (−8.5)	19.4 (−7.0)	25.7 (−3.5)	37.0 (2.8)	47.3 (8.5)	56.3 (13.5)	61.1 (16.2)	60.1 (15.6)	52.9 (11.6)	41.9 (5.5)	32.8 (0.4)	22.8 (−5.1)	39.6 (4.2)
Record low °F (°C)	−17.9 (−27.7)	−8.2 (−22.3)	−0.6 (−18.1)	13.6 (−10.2)	29.3 (−1.5)	37.5 (3.1)	43.7 (6.5)	37.4 (3.0)	30.3 (−0.9)	19.4 (−7.0)	6.4 (−14.2)	−7.6 (−22.0)	−17.9 (−27.7)
Average precipitation inches (mm)	3.34 (85)	2.85 (72)	3.69 (94)	4.00 (102)	4.22 (107)	4.78 (121)	4.55 (116)	4.07 (103)	4.90 (124)	4.43 (113)	3.83 (97)	3.97 (101)	48.63 (1,235)
Average snowfall inches (cm)	16.7 (42)	12.0 (30)	12.4 (31)	3.0 (7.6)	0.0 (0.0)	0.0 (0.0)	0.0 (0.0)	0.0 (0.0)	0.0 (0.0)	0.1 (0.25)	3.2 (8.1)	10.0 (25)	57.3 (146)
Average relative humidity (%)	70.4	66.6	62.6	60.7	65.2	72.5	71.9	74.9	75.7	74.0	71.8	72.8	70.0
Average dew point °F (°C)	17.0 (−8.3)	18.7 (−7.4)	24.0 (−4.4)	34.6 (1.4)	46.4 (8.0)	57.3 (14.1)	61.5 (16.4)	61.4 (16.3)	54.9 (12.7)	43.4 (6.3)	32.9 (0.5)	22.9 (−5.1)	39.7 (4.3)
Source: PRISM

== Ecology ==
According to A. W. Kuchler potential natural vegetation types, Blue Mountain Ski Resort has a dominant vegetation type of Appalachian oak (104) with a dominant vegetation form of eastern hardwood forest (23). The plant hardiness zone is 6a with an average annual extreme minimum air temperature of −7.0 °F (−21.7 °C). The spring bloom typically begins around April 22, and fall color usually peaks before October 20.
