= Little Gap, Pennsylvania =

Unincorporated community in Pennsylvania, US

- Unincorporated community
- Location within Pennsylvania Location within the United States
- Coordinates: 40°49′58″N 75°31′21″W
- Country: United States
- State: Pennsylvania
- County: Carbon
- Township: Lower Towamensing
- Elevation: 469 ft (143 m)
- Time zone: UTC-5 (Eastern (EST))
  - Summer (DST): UTC-4 (EDT)
- ZIP codes: 18038, 18058, 18071
- Area codes: 610 and 484
- GNIS feature ID: 1179552

Little Gap is a village in eastern Lower Towamensing Township, Pennsylvania on the Aquashicola Creek, which is crossed by a covered bridge, open to vehicular traffic. Blue Mountain Resort is located just to the south of the village, which is split between the Danielsville, Kunkletown, and Palmerton ZIP Codes of 18038, 18058, and 18071, respectively.
