= Country Junction =

Retail store in Forest Inn, Pennsylvania, US

- Industry: General store
- Founded: 1983; 43 years ago
- Founder: Jim Everett and Jan Everett
- Headquarters: Forest Inn, Pennsylvania, U.S.

Country Junction is a general store located in Forest Inn, Pennsylvania, near Lehighton. It was founded in 1983 as a thermal insulation installing company named "The Service Team." After customer requests, it starting stocking a multitude of retail items and thus changed its name into what it is today. The original store was destroyed by a fire in 2006, and was replaced by the current store in 2010.

It sells a multitude of items including flowers, jewelry, furniture, pets, pet supplies, wine, fudge, prepared food, hardware equipment, and building materials. The store also lets customers rent construction machines. Additionally, they still have installation services for a variety of products.
