= Palmerton Area High School =

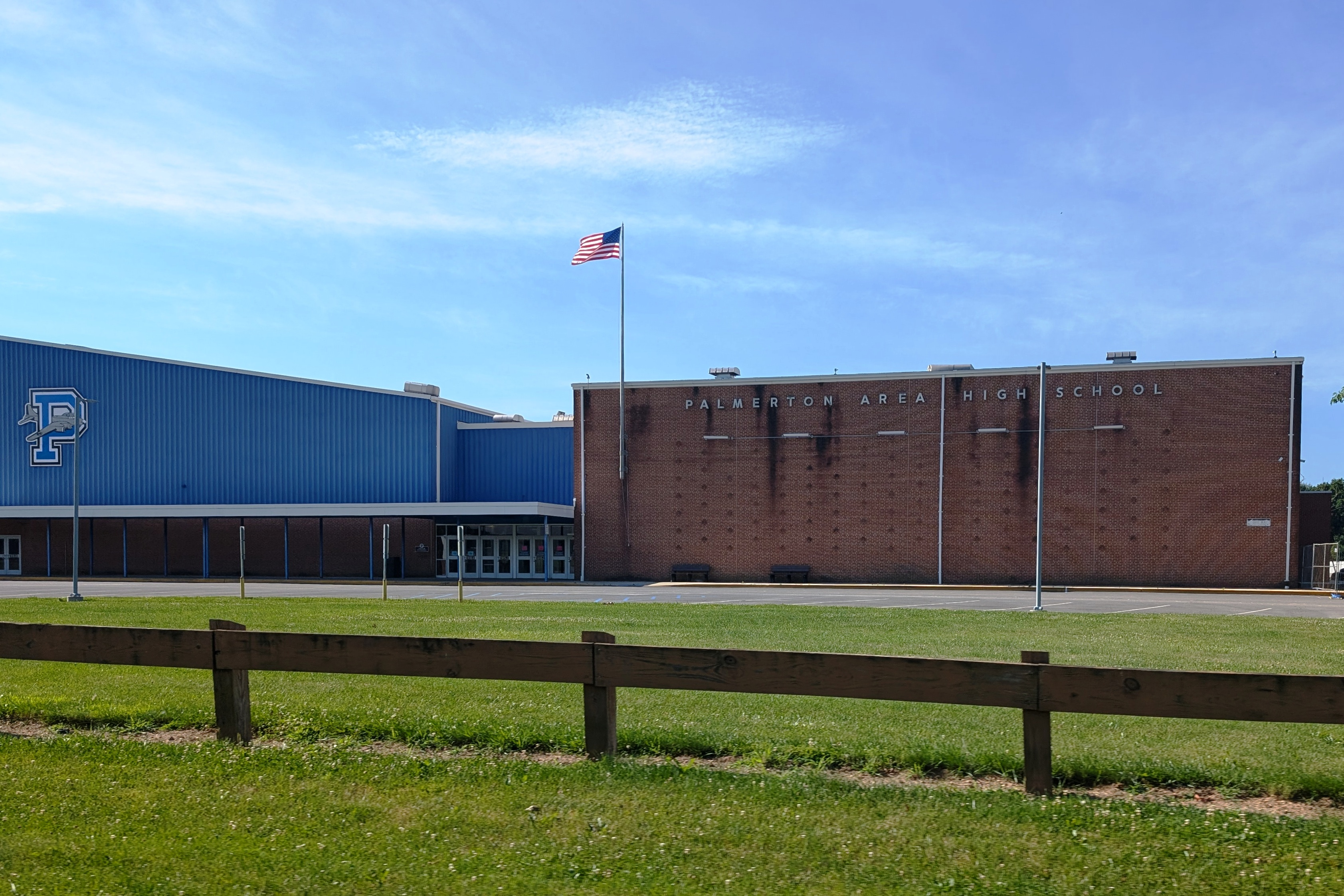
- Front of school

Location
- 3525 Fireline Road; Palmerton, Pennsylvania 18071; U.S.
- 40.81208°N 75.60737°W

Information
- Type: Public high school
- School district: Palmerton Area School District
- NCES School ID: 421836004734
- Principal: Paula Husar
- Faculty: 40.35 (on an FTE basis)
- Grades: 9th–12th
- Enrollment: 482 (2022–2023)
- Student to teacher ratio: 11.95
- Campus type: Suburb: Large
- Colors: Blue and White
- Athletics conference: Colonial League
- Mascot: Blue Bombers
- Rival: Northern Lehigh High School
- Website: pahs.palmerton.org

Palmerton Area High School is a four-year public high school in Palmerton in Carbon County, Pennsylvania. Palmerton Area High School is the sole high school operated by Palmerton Area School District. In the 2021–2022 school year, enrollment was 467 pupils in 9th through 12th grades. The junior high and senior high share a single building.

High school students may choose to attend the Carbon Career and Technical Institute for training in the construction and mechanical trades. The Carbon-Lehigh Intermediate Unit IU21 provides the school with a wide variety of services like specialized education for disabled students; state-mandated training on recognizing and reporting child abuse; speech and visual disability services; criminal background check processing for prospective employees and professional development for staff and faculty.

The school colors are blue and white, and the athletic teams are the Blue Bombers. The first graduating class from the current school was that of 1966. The previous high school building is now occupied by Stephen S. Palmer Elementary School.

== Extracurriculars ==
Palmerton Area High School offers a wide variety of clubs, activities and an extensive, publicly funded sports program.

=== Athletics ===
Palmerton Area High School competes in District XI tournaments and is part of the Colonial League and the Pennsylvania Interscholastic Athletic Association (PIAA). The school joined the Colonial League in 1994. The district's sports teams include:

Varsity

Boys

- Baseball - AAA (2016 district champions)
- Basketball - AAA
- Cross country - A
- Football - AA
- Golf - AA
- Soccer - AA
- Tennis - AA
- Track and field - AA
- Wrestling - AA

Girls

- Basketball - AAA
- Cross country - A
- Field hockey - A
- Soccer - AA
- Softball - AAA
- Track and field - AA
- Volleyball - AA
- Wrestling - AA (2026 League Champions)]

According to the PIAA directory July 2016

Sports history

From 1977 to 1993, Palmerton was a member of the Centennial League, which also included Pocono Mountain, East Stroudsburg, Stroudsburg, Pleasant Valley, Lehighton, Northern Lehigh, Northwestern Lehigh, and Notre Dame (Green Pond). By 1993, increasingly large enrollments in the AAAA schools in the Poconos from Monroe County (Pocono Mountain, Pleasant Valley, Stroudsburg, and East Stroudsburg) had left the league dominated by these larger schools with the disparity in the quality of the athletic programs. In 1994, these schools and Lehighton created a new league called the Mountain Valley Conference (MVC). Though in a different league, Lehighton has remained a geographical rival to Palmerton. Lehighton joined the Colonial League in 2023.
