= Darwin Prockop =

American biochemist (1929–2024)

- Born: August 31, 1929; Palmerton, Pennsylvania, U.S.
- Died: January 22, 2024 (aged 94); Philadelphia, Pennsylvania, U.S.
- Known for: Mesenchymal stem cell research
- Scientific career
- Fields: Biochemistry
- Workplaces: Texas A&M Health Science Center

Darwin Prockop (August 31, 1929 – January 22, 2024) was an American biochemist and progenitor cell researcher. He held academic posts at several universities, and joined the faculty at the Texas A&M Health Science Center in 2008. Prockop was elected to several academic societies, including the National Academy of Sciences and the Institute of Medicine.

== Biography ==
Prockop completed an undergraduate degree from Haverford College and a master's degree in animal physiology from Brasenose College, Oxford. He earned a medical degree (1956) from University of Pennsylvania and a Ph.D. in biochemistry (1961) from George Washington University.

He was a faculty member at the University of Pennsylvania, the University of Medicine and Dentistry of New Jersey (UMDNJ), Jefferson Medical College, and Tulane University. At Tulane, he directed the Center for Gene Therapy. In 2008, he came to the Texas A&M Health Science Center, where he was Professor of Molecular and Cellular Medicine and the Stearman Chair in Genomic Medicine. He also served as Director of the Institute for Regenerative Medicine at Scott & White Memorial Hospital in Temple.

Prockop died January 22, 2024.

== Research ==
Prockop's research as a biochemist has focused on collagen and connective tissue diseases such as osteogenesis imperfecta and Marfan syndrome. In 2001, he organized the first scientific meeting focused on mesenchymal stem cells. Stem cell researcher Massimo Dominici said that "the cell therapy landscape would look completely different without his involvement."

== Honors and awards ==
In 1991, Prockop was elected to the National Academy of Sciences. The following year he was elected to the Institute of Medicine. In 1994, he received a Distinguished Graduate Award from the Perelman School of Medicine.
