= Kunkletown, Pennsylvania =

Unincorporated community in Pennsylvania, US

- Unincorporated community
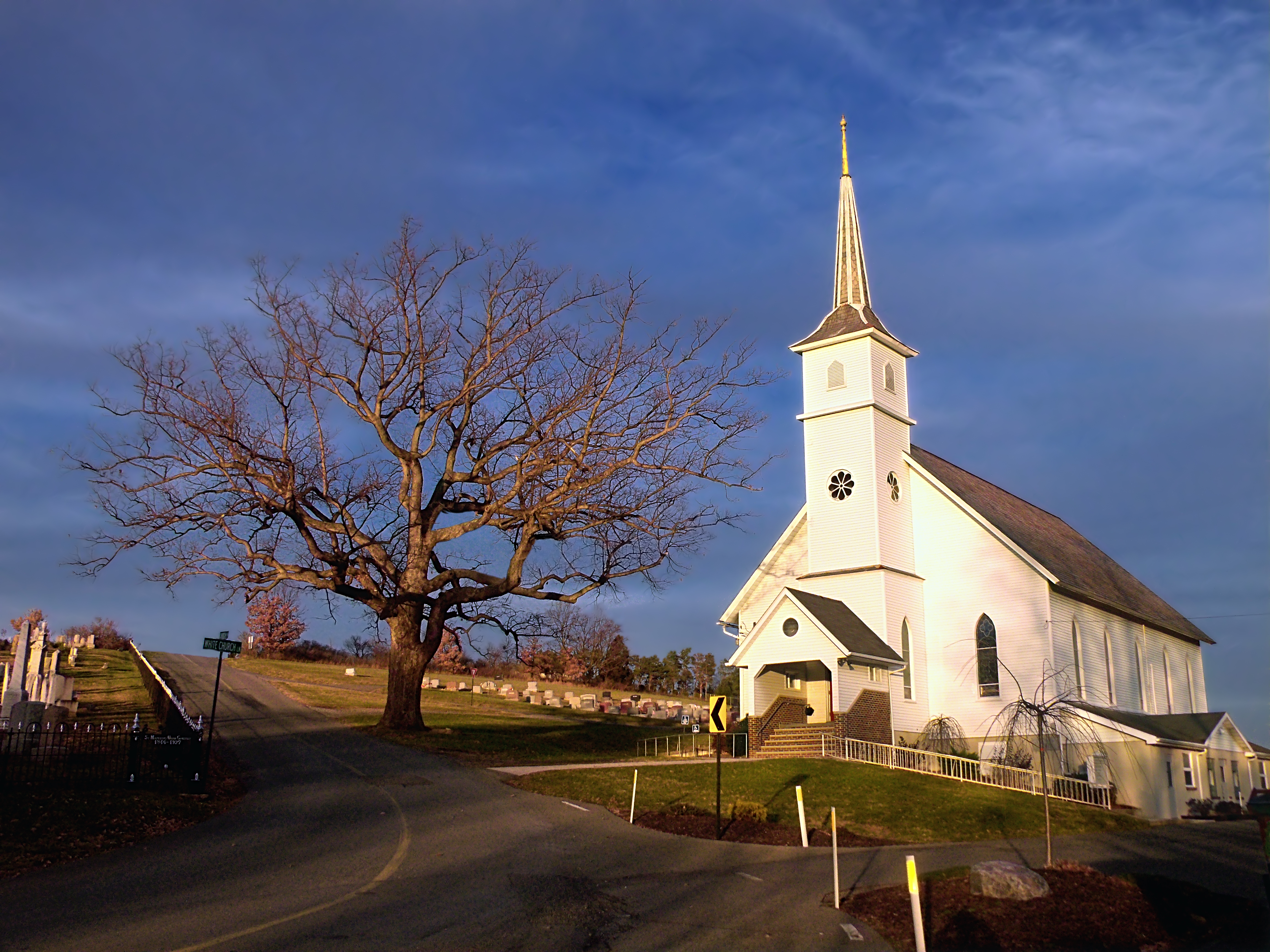
- Saint Matthew's Church in Kunkletown

- Location within Pennsylvania Location within the United States
- Coordinates: 40°50′52″N 75°26′54″W
- Country: United States
- State: Pennsylvania
- County: Monroe
- Township: Eldred
- Elevation: 531 ft (162 m)
- Time zone: UTC-5 (Eastern (EST))
  - Summer (DST): UTC-4 (EDT)
- ZIP code: 18058
- Area codes: 610 and 484
- GNIS feature ID: 1178712

Kunkletown is an unincorporated community in Eldred Township, Monroe County, Pennsylvania, United States, at an elevation of 531 feet.

== History ==
An 1845 book is the first published reference to Kunklesville. It says it bore "the name of its proprietor, [and that it] was started about 15 years ago, consisting of seven or eight dwellings, one tavern, one store, a school house, a German Reformed Church and a grist mill."

== Demographics ==
The population of Kunkletown's ZIP code in the 2010 census was 9,464, of whom 8,924 were White, 377 were African-American, 499 were Hispanic, 81 were Asian-American, 77 were American Indian, 9 were Hawaiian, and 161 were of other races. The average home value in 2000 was $114,800, and the average household income that year was $44,580.

== Notable person ==
- Gray Morrow, illustrator (lived there at time of death)
