= Aquashicola Creek =

Tributary of the Lehigh River in Northeastern Pennsylvania

Coordinates: 40.7923°N 75.6124°W

Aquashicola Creek (Ahkwa-SHIK-ola), also known as Aquanchicola Creek, or Aquanshicola Creek, is a 20.8-mile-long (33.5 km) tributary of the Lehigh River in the Pocono Mountains in Northeastern Pennsylvania.

The name is derived from the language of the Lenape, meaning "where we fish with the bush net." The creek rises from a swamp to the southeast of Saylorsburg, and flows westward between Chestnut Ridge and Blue Mountain. It meets its major tributary, Buckwha Creek, to the south of Little Gap and joins the Lehigh River at Palmerton.

== Tributaries ==
- Buckwha Creek

== See also ==
- List of rivers of Pennsylvania
- Meniolagomeka, former Indian settlement organized by Moravian missionaries

== Bibliography ==
- "Aquashicola Creek (in Carbon County, PA)".
