= List of places in Pennsylvania: Pl–Q =

This list of cities, towns, unincorporated communities, counties, and other recognized places in the U.S. state of Pennsylvania also includes information on the number and names of counties in which the place lies, and its lower and upper zip code bounds, if applicable.

Name of place	Number of counties	Principal county	Lower zip code	Upper zip code
Plain Grove	1	Lawrence County		
Plain Grove Township	1	Lawrence County		
Plainfield	1	Cumberland County	17081	
Plainfield	1	York County	17319	
Plainfield Township	1	Northampton County		
Plains	1	Luzerne County	18705	
Plains Junction	1	Luzerne County		
Plains Township	1	Luzerne County		
Plainsville	1	Luzerne County	18705	
Plainview	1	Adams County	17325	
Plainville	1	Lebanon County		
Plane Bank	1	Cambria County		
Planebrook	1	Chester County	19355	
Plank	1	Tioga County	16938	
Platea	1	Erie County	16417	
Plateau Heights	1	Crawford County	16335	
Plattsville	1	Cambria County	16646	
Plaza	1	Butler County	16001	
Plaza Heights	1	York County	17331	
Pleasant Corners	1	Carbon County	18235	
Pleasant Corners	1	Lehigh County		
Pleasant Gap	1	Centre County	16823	
Pleasant Grove	1	Lancaster County	17563	
Pleasant Grove	1	Union County		
Pleasant Grove	1	Washington County	15323	
Pleasant Grove	1	Westmoreland County		
Pleasant Grove	1	York County	17370	
Pleasant Hall	1	Franklin County	17246	
Pleasant Hill	1	Cambria County		
Pleasant Hill	1	Clearfield County	16839	16866
Pleasant Hill	1	Delaware County	19063	
Pleasant Hill	1	Erie County		
Pleasant Hill	1	Fayette County		
Pleasant Hill	1	Indiana County	15701	
Pleasant Hill	1	Lawrence County	16123	
Pleasant Hill	1	Lebanon County	17042	
Pleasant Hill	1	York County	17331	
Pleasant Hills	1	Allegheny County	15236	
Pleasant Hills	1	Dauphin County	17112	
Pleasant Mount	1	Wayne County	18453	
Pleasant Ridge	1	Fulton County		
Pleasant Run	1	Montgomery County		
Pleasant Township	1	Warren County		
Pleasant Union	1	Somerset County	15552	
Pleasant Unity	1	Westmoreland County	15676	
Pleasant Valley	1	Berks County	19533	
Pleasant Valley	1	Blair County	16601	
Pleasant Valley	1	Bucks County	18951	
Pleasant Valley	1	Fayette County		
Pleasant Valley	1	Lancaster County	17604	
Pleasant Valley	1	Schuylkill County	17963	
Pleasant Valley	1	Westmoreland County	15642	
Pleasant Valley Township	1	Potter County		
Pleasant View	1	Armstrong County		
Pleasant View	1	Centre County	16823	
Pleasant View	1	Dauphin County	17036	
Pleasant View	1	Juniata County	17082	
Pleasant View	1	York County	17356	
Pleasant View Heights	1	Washington County		
Pleasant View Summit	1	Luzerne County		
Pleasant Village	1	Blair County	16601	
Pleasantview	1	Beaver County	15010	
Pleasantville	1	Allegheny County	15065	
Pleasantville	1	Bedford County	15521	
Pleasantville	1	Berks County		
Pleasantville	1	Venango County	16341	
Pleasureville	1	York County	17402	
Pleasureville Heights	1	York County	17402	
Plowville	1	Berks County		
Plum	1	Venango County	16354	
Plum Borough	1	Allegheny County	15239	
Plum Creek	1	Allegheny County	15239	
Plum Run	1	Fulton County	17212	
Plum Township	1	Venango County		
Plumbridge	1	Bucks County	19058	
Plumbsock	1	Washington County		
Plumcreek Township	1	Armstrong County		
Plumer	1	Venango County	16301	
Plummer	1	Fayette County	15458	
Plumsock	1	Chester County	19073	
Plumstead Township	1	Bucks County		
Plumsteadville	1	Bucks County	18949	
Plumville	1	Indiana County	16246	
Plunketts Creek Township	1	Lycoming County		
Plymouth	1	Luzerne County	18651	
Plymouth Center	1	Montgomery County	19462	
Plymouth Junction	1	Luzerne County	18651	
Plymouth Meeting	1	Montgomery County	19462	
Plymouth Township	1	Luzerne County		
Plymouth Township	1	Montgomery County		
Plymouth Valley	1	Montgomery County	19401	
Plymptonville	1	Clearfield County	16830	
Pocahontas	1	Somerset County	15552	
Pocono Country Place	1	Monroe County		
Pocono Heights	1	Monroe County		
Pocono Lake	1	Monroe County	18347	
Pocono Lake Preserve	1	Monroe County	18348	
Pocono Manor	1	Monroe County	18349	
Pocono Mountain Lake Estates	1	Carbon County		
Pocono Park	1	Monroe County	18360	
Pocono Pines	1	Monroe County	18350	
Pocono Playhouse	1	Monroe County		
Pocono Summit	1	Monroe County	18346	
Pocono Summit Estates	1	Monroe County	18346	
Pocono Township	1	Monroe County		
Pocopson	1	Chester County	19366	
Pocopson Township	1	Chester County		
Pogue	1	Huntingdon County	17264	
Point	1	Bedford County	15559	
Point	1	Butler County	16001	
Point Breeze	1	Allegheny County	15147	15208
Point Breeze	1	Fayette County		
Point Breeze	1	Northumberland County		
Point Breeze	1	Philadelphia County	19145	
Point Hill	1	Venango County		
Point Lookout	1	Washington County		
Point Marion	1	Fayette County	15474	
Point Phillip	1	Northampton County	18014	
Point Pleasant	1	Bucks County	18950	
Point Township	1	Northumberland County		
Point View	1	Blair County	16693	
Point View	1	Fulton County		
Poke Run	1	Westmoreland County		
Pokeytown	1	Somerset County	15563	
Poland	1	Greene County	15327	
Poland Mines	1	Greene County		
Polen	1	Greene County		
Polk	1	Venango County	16342	
Polk Junction	1	Venango County	16342	
Polk Township	1	Jefferson County		
Polk Township	1	Monroe County		
Polk Valley	1	Northampton County	18055	
Polktown	1	Franklin County	17268	
Polkville	1	Columbia County		
Pomeroy	1	Chester County	19367	
Pomeroy Heights	1	Chester County	19320	
Pond Bank	1	Franklin County	17201	
Pond Creek	1	Luzerne County	18661	
Pond Eddy	1	Pike County	12770	
Pond Hill	1	Luzerne County	18660	
Pont	1	Erie County	16401	
Pools Corner	1	Bucks County	18901	
Poorman Side	1	Centre County		
Poplar Bridge	1	Monroe County		
Poplar Grove	1	Fayette County	15425	
Poplar Grove	1	Lancaster County	17543	
Poplars	1	York County		
Porkey	1	Forest County		
Port Allegany	1	McKean County	16743	
Port Ann	1	Snyder County		
Port Barnett	1	Jefferson County	15825	
Port Blanchard	1	Luzerne County	18640	
Port Bowkley	1	Luzerne County		
Port Carbon	1	Schuylkill County	17965	
Port Clinton	1	Schuylkill County	19549	
Port Griffith	1	Luzerne County	18640	
Port Indian	1	Montgomery County	19401	
Port Jenkins	1	Luzerne County	18661	
Port Kennedy	1	Montgomery County	19406	
Port Matilda	1	Centre County	16870	
Port Perry	1	Allegheny County		
Port Providence	1	Montgomery County	19460	
Port Richmond	1	Philadelphia County		
Port Royal	1	Juniata County	17082	
Port Royal	1	Westmoreland County		
Port Trevorton	1	Snyder County	17864	
Port Vue	1	Allegheny County	15133	
Portage	1	Cambria County	15946	
Portage Creek	1	McKean County	16743	
Portage Township	1	Cambria County		
Portage Township	1	Cameron County		
Portage Township	1	Potter County		
Porter	1	Jefferson County	15767	
Porter Township	1	Clarion County		
Porter Township	1	Clinton County		
Porter Township	1	Huntingdon County		
Porter Township	1	Jefferson County		
Porter Township	1	Lycoming County		
Porter Township	1	Pike County		
Porter Township	1	Schuylkill County		
Porters	1	York County		
Porters Corners	1	Crawford County		
Porters Mill	1	Chester County		
Porters Sideling	1	York County	17354	
Portersville	1	Butler County	16051	
Portland	1	Northampton County	18351	
Portland Mills	1	Elk County	15853	
Possum Hollow	1	Lawrence County	16157	
Potetown	1	Blair County	16673	
Potosi	1	York County	17327	
Potter Brook	1	Tioga County	16950	
Potter Township	1	Beaver County		
Potter Township	1	Centre County		
Potters Mills	1	Centre County	16875	
Pottersdale	1	Clearfield County	16871	
Potterville	1	Bradford County	18837	
Potts Grove	1	Northumberland County	17865	
Pottsgrove	1	Montgomery County		
Pottsgrove	1	Northumberland County		
Pottstown	1	Montgomery County	19464	
Pottstown Landing	1	Chester County	19464	
Pottsville	1	Schuylkill County	17901	
Powder Valley	1	Lehigh County	18092	
Powell	1	Bradford County	18832	
Powells Valley	1	Dauphin County	17032	
Powelton	1	Centre County	16677	
Powys	1	Lycoming County	17728	
Poyntelle	1	Wayne County	18454	
Prattville	1	Bradford County		
Preisser	1	Cambria County		
Prentisvale	1	McKean County	16731	
Prescott	1	Lebanon County	17042	
Prescottville	1	Jefferson County	15851	
Preserve	1	Monroe County		
President	1	Venango County	16353	
President Township	1	Venango County		
Presidential Heights	1	Allegheny County	15237	
Presque Isle	1	Erie County	16505	
Presston	1	Allegheny County	15136	
Presswood	1	Bradford County		
Presto	1	Allegheny County	15142	
Preston	1	Luzerne County	18706	
Preston	1	McKean County		
Preston Hill	1	Schuylkill County	17935	
Preston Park	1	Wayne County	18455	
Preston Township	1	Wayne County		
Pretoria	1	Somerset County	15935	
Price Township	1	Monroe County		
Priceburg	1	Lackawanna County	18519	
Pricedale	1	Westmoreland County	15072	
Pricetown	1	Berks County	19522	
Priceville	1	Wayne County	18417	
Prichard	1	Luzerne County		
Primos	1	Delaware County	19018	
Primos-Secane	1	Delaware County	19018	
Primrose	1	Schuylkill County	17901	
Primrose	1	Washington County	15057	
Primrose-Forestville-Jonestown	1	Schuylkill County	17901	
Princeton	1	Lawrence County	16101	
Pringle	1	Luzerne County	18704	
Pritchard	1	Tioga County		
Pritchards Corner	1	Mercer County		
Prittstown	1	Fayette County	15666	
Proctor	1	Lycoming County	17701	
Progress	1	Dauphin County	17109	
Promised Land	1	Pike County		
Prompton	1	Wayne County	18456	
Prospect	1	Butler County	16052	
Prospect	1	Cambria County		
Prospect Gardens	1	Lancaster County	17602	
Prospect Heights	1	Northampton County	18017	
Prospect Hill	1	Lackawanna County	18447	
Prospect Park	1	Cameron County	15834	
Prospect Park	1	Delaware County	19076	
Prospect Park	1	Northampton County	18042	
Prospectville	1	Montgomery County	19002	
Prosperity	1	Washington County	15329	
Providence	1	Lackawanna County		
Providence Downe	1	Delaware County	19063	
Providence Square	1	Montgomery County	19426	
Providence Township	1	Lancaster County		
Providence Village	1	Delaware County	19086	
Provins Works	1	Fayette County	15461	
Pughtown	1	Chester County	19464	
Pulaski	1	Lawrence County	16143	
Pulaski Township	1	Beaver County		
Pulaski Township	1	Lawrence County		
Punxsutawney	1	Jefferson County	15767	
Purcell	1	Bedford County	15535	
Purchase Line	1	Indiana County	15729	
Puritan	1	Cambria County	15946	
Puritan	1	Fayette County	15458	
Puseyville	1	Lancaster County		
Putnam Township	1	Tioga County		
Putnamville	1	Warren County	16345	
Putneyville	1	Armstrong County	16242	
Puttstown	1	Huntingdon County		
Puzzletown	1	Blair County	16635	
Pyles Mills	1	Lawrence County		
Pymatuning	1	Mercer County		
Pymatuning Central	1	Crawford County		
Pymatuning North	1	Crawford County		
Pymatuning South	1	Crawford County		
Pymatuning Township	1	Mercer County		
Pyrra	1	Armstrong County	16226	
Quakake	1	Schuylkill County	18245	
Quaker City	1	Berks County		
Quaker Hills	1	Lancaster County	17551	
Quaker Lake	1	Susquehanna County	18812	
Quaker Valley	1	Adams County	17307	
Quakertown	1	Bucks County	18951	
Quarry Glen	1	Bradford County		
Quarryville	1	Lancaster County	17566	
Quecreek	1	Somerset County	15555	
Queen	1	Bedford County	16670	
Queen	1	Forest County	16321	
Queen City	1	Columbia County	17820	
Queen Junction	1	Butler County		
Queen Lane	1	Philadelphia County		
Queens Grant	1	Bucks County	19067	
Queens Run	1	Clinton County	17745	
Queenstown	1	Armstrong County	16041	
Quemahoning Junction	1	Somerset County		
Quemahoning Township	1	Somerset County		
Quentin	1	Lebanon County	17083	
Quicks Bend	1	Bradford County	18846	
Quicktown	1	Lackawanna County	18444	
Quiet Dell	1	Greene County		
Quiggleville	1	Lycoming County	17728	
Quincy	1	Franklin County	17247	
Quincy Hollow	1	Bucks County		
Quincy Township	1	Franklin County		
Quinlan Corners	1	Lackawanna County		
Quinlantown	1	Bradford County		
Quinsonia	1	Franklin County		
Quitman	1	Northumberland County		
