= Pennsylvania Route 940 =

State highway in Pennsylvania, US

Pennsylvania Route 940

Route information
- Maintained by PennDOT
- Length: 43.208 mi (69.537 km)
- Existed: 1928–present

Major junctions
- West end: PA 309 in Hazleton
- I-80 in White Haven; PA 437 in White Haven; PA 534 in East Side; I-80 / I-476 Toll / Penna Turnpike NE Extension near Hickory Run State Park; PA 115 in Blakeslee; PA 423 in Pocono Pines; I-380 in Pocono Pines; PA 314 in Pocono Pines; PA 196 / PA 611 in Mount Pocono; PA 390 in Paradise Valley
- East end: PA 191 in Paradise Valley

Location
- Country: United States
- State: Pennsylvania
- Counties: Luzerne, Carbon, Monroe

Highway system
- Pennsylvania State Route System; Interstate; US; State; Scenic; Legislative
← PA 938	→ PA 941
← PA 613	PA 615	→ PA 616

Pennsylvania Route 940 (PA 940) is a 43.2-mile-long (69.5 km) Pennsylvania highway located in the Pocono Mountains. It runs from PA 309 in Hazleton east to PA 191 in Paradise Valley. Large segments of PA 940 are located in densely forested areas. The route heads northeast through Luzerne County from Hazleton, passing through Freeland and coming to an interchange with Interstate 80 (I-80) in White Haven. From here, PA 940 turns east and runs a short distance north of I-80, coming to an interchange with both I-80 and I-476 (Pennsylvania Turnpike Northeast Extension) in northern Carbon County. The route continues through Monroe County and passes through Pocono Pines before it has an interchange with I-380. PA 940 passes through Mount Pocono prior to continuing to its eastern terminus.

PA 940 was first designated in 1928 between White Haven and PA 115 in Blakeslee. The road between Blakeslee and Pocono Summit was part of PA 115 while PA 615 was designated between PA 115 in Pocono Summit and PA 90 (now PA 390) west of Paradise Valley. PA 940 was extended east to U.S. Route 611 (US 611) in Swiftwater in 1935, replacing a portion of PA 115. PA 615 was decommissioned in 1946. PA 940 was extended west to US 309 in Hazleton by 1950. PA 196 was designated onto the roadway between Mount Pocono and Paradise Valley in 1956. PA 940 was moved to its current alignment between Pocono Summit and Paradise Valley in 1964 after the roadway in Pocono Summit was upgraded to a divided highway; the route replaced PA 196 between Mount Pocono and Paradise Valley while PA 314 was designated along the former PA 940 between Pocono Summit and Swiftwater.

== Route description ==
=== Luzerne County ===
PA 940 begins at an intersection with PA 309 and 22nd Street at the northern border of the city of Hazleton in Luzerne County, heading northeast as a two-lane undivided road into Hazle Township. The road passes a mix of homes and businesses to the east of Church Hill Mall and curves north, running through wooded areas, heading between commercial development to the west and a coal mine to the east. The route turns east onto Main Street, passing through the residential community of Harleigh and curving northeast. PA 940 heads through forested areas with some homes and curves back to the east, running a short distance to the north of a Reading Blue Mountain and Northern Railroad line and a coal mine. The road passes through the communities of Ebervale and Oakdale before it becomes lined with homes as it runs through the community of Japan. Here, the route turns to the north and heads into forests, curving northwest and running through the residential community of Drifton. PA 940 curves northeast and passes through the community of Youngstown before it crosses into Foster Township, running through a mix of forests and homes.

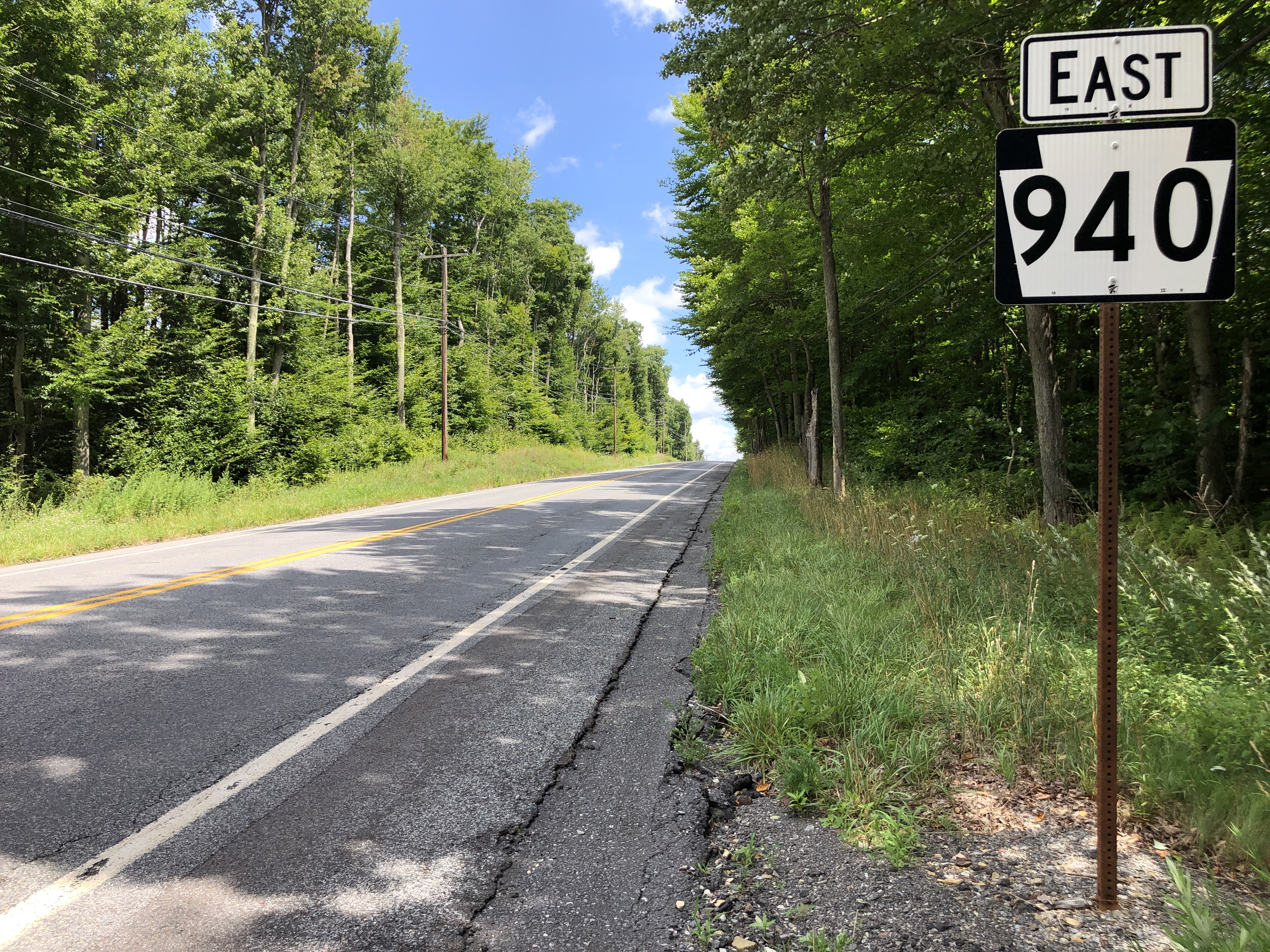
PA 940 eastbound in Kidder Township

The route passes through industrial areas before it reaches the residential community of Woodside and quickly turns east onto Hazle Street and then north onto Centre Street. The road heads into the borough of Freeland and passes homes before heading into the commercial downtown. Here, PA 940 turns east onto South Street and runs past residences and commercial establishments, becoming the border between Freeland to the north and Foster Township to the south before fully entering Foster Township. The road heads northeast into forested areas with occasional residential and commercial development, with the name becoming Foster Avenue. The route continues through rural areas and curves to the east, passing to the north of the Hickory Hills residential development. PA 940 runs through more forests with some development and makes a turn to the north and enters the borough of White Haven, where the name becomes Church Street. The road passes northwest of a park and ride lot before it widens to a four-lane divided highway and comes to an interchange with I-80 at exit 273. Past this interchange, the route becomes a two-lane undivided road again and passes homes and a few businesses, coming to an intersection with the southern terminus of PA 437 in the center of White Haven. Here, PA 437 continues north on Church Street and PA 940 turns east onto Berwick Street, running past more residences. The road crosses the Reading Blue Mountain and Northern Railroad's Lehigh Division line at-grade and passes businesses and industrial development before coming to a bridge over the Lehigh River.

=== Carbon and Monroe counties ===
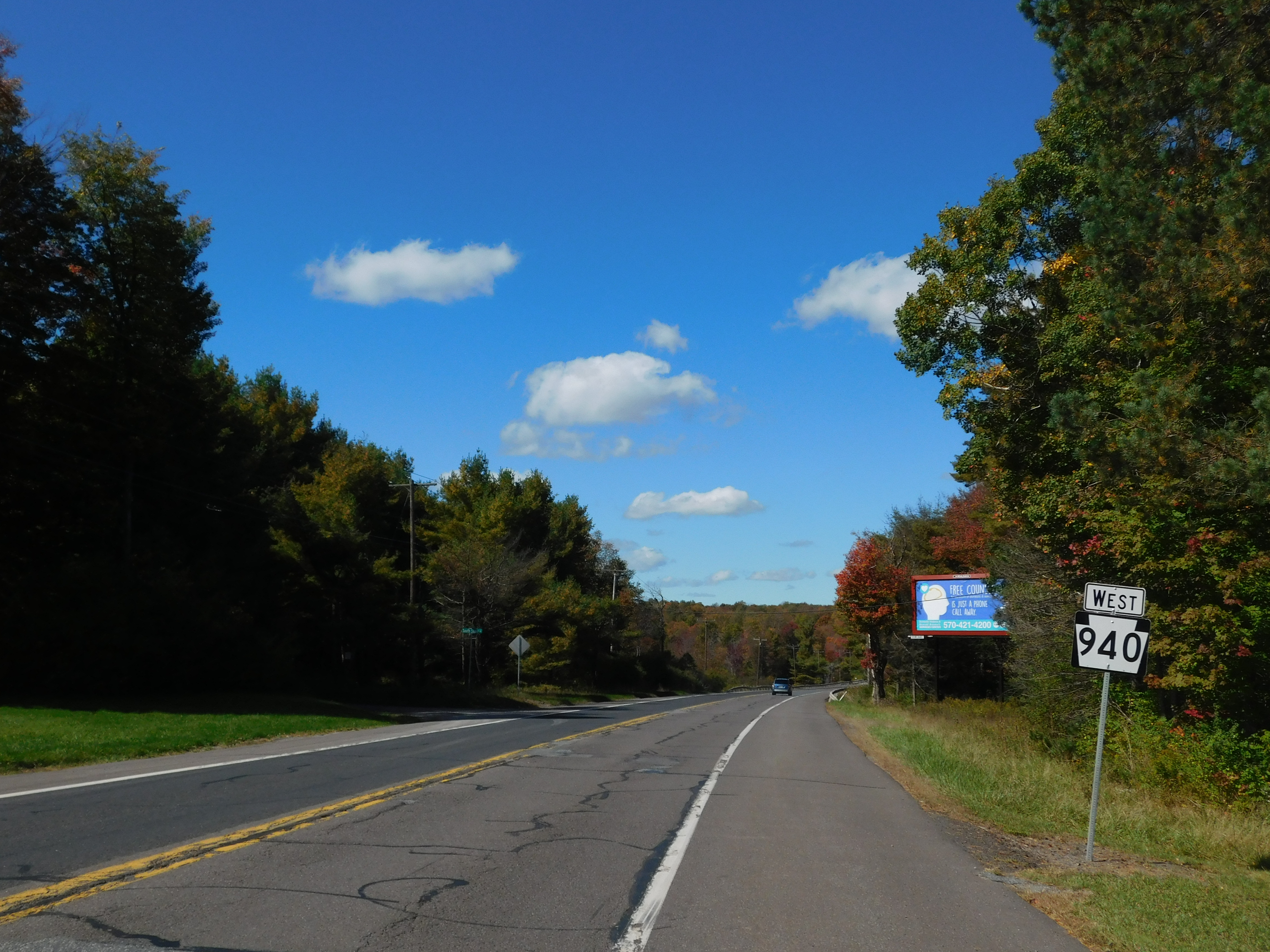
PA 940 west in Pocono Pines

After crossing the Lehigh River, PA 940 enters Carbon County and the borough of East Side. After crossing the river, the route makes a turn to the north to become River Street, then curves to the east to become State Street, heading through wooded residential areas. The road continues east through forested areas with occasional homes and businesses. At the eastern border of East Side, PA 940 intersects the western terminus of PA 534, which provides access to Hickory Run State Park. Past this intersection, the route enters Kidder Township and becomes an unnamed road, heading through dense forests in the Pocono Mountains region. Farther east, PA 940 passes to the south of a residential development. The road heads into business areas and comes to a junction with I-80 to the south and I-476 (Pennsylvania Turnpike Northeast Extension) at the Pocono interchange to the north at two trumpet interchanges that meet at PA 940 with traffic lights. From here, the route heads northeast and passes under I-476, heading into forests and passing through the community of Leonardsville, with the Pocono Mountain Lake Estates residential development to the northwest. PA 940 curves east and continues through forested land as it passes to the south of the Jack Frost Ski Resort and Jack Frost National Golf Club and comes to an intersection with Jack Frost Mountain Road/Moseywood Road, with Jack Frost Mountain Road heading north to the ski resort and golf course and Moseywood Road heading south as a private toll road to provide access to the community of Lake Harmony. Farther east, the road curves northeast and comes to a bridge over Tobyhanna Creek.

After crossing the Tobyhanna Creek, PA 940 enters Tobyhanna Township in Monroe County. The route passes through forests with some homes and businesses and reaches the community of Blakeslee, where it intersects PA 115 in a commercial area. Past this intersection, the road heads through forested areas and residential development, passing to the southeast of the Green Wood Acres private development before heading through the community of Camelot Forest, where it passes near homes and a few businesses. PA 940 continues through forests with some homes and businesses, passing to the southeast of the Blakeslee Estates and Forest Glen developments and to the northwest of the Pocono Lake Preserve development. In the community of Locust Lakes Village, the road bends to the east and continues through dense forest with some homes, passing to the north of the Wagners Forest Park private development. Farther east, the route turns southeast and crosses Tobyhanna Creek to the north of Pocono Lake. PA 940 curves to the northeast and reaches the community of Pocono Pines, where it comes to an intersection with the southern terminus of PA 423. Past this intersection, the road runs along the southern shore of Lake Naomi as it continues through a mix of forests and homes. The route continues through rural land with residential development and passes to the south of Stillwater Lake. PA 940 curves southeast and runs near a few homes and businesses before it widens to a four-lane divided highway and comes to an interchange with I-380 at exit 3.

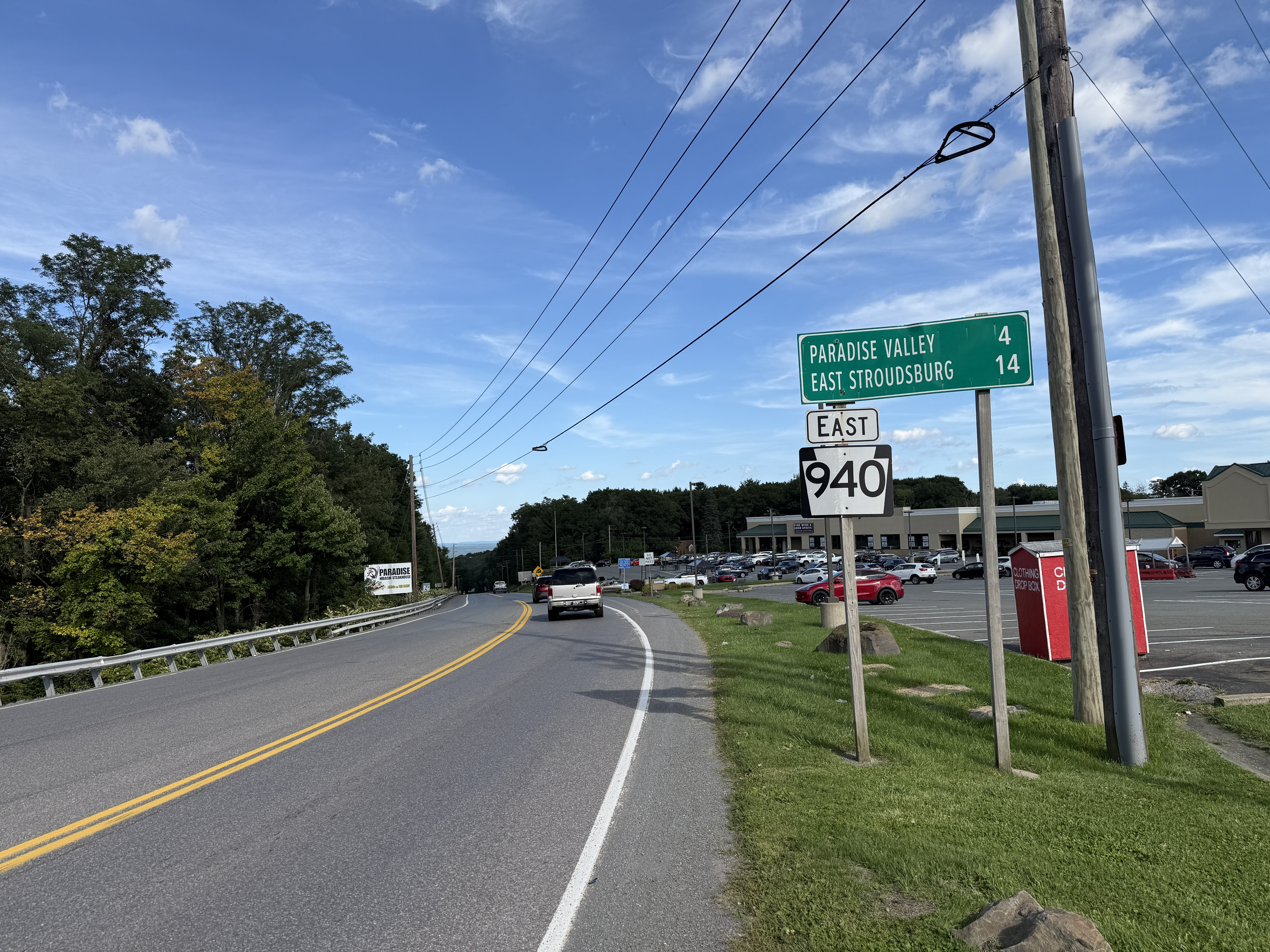
PA 940 eastbound past PA 611 in Mount Pocono

East of I-380, PA 940 heads northeast through forests with some commercial development to the northwest. The divided highway comes to an interchange with the western terminus of PA 314 to the south of the community of Pocono Summit. Immediately after this interchange, the route comes to a bridge over a Delaware-Lackawanna Railroad line. PA 940 becomes Pocono Summit Road and crosses into Coolbaugh Township. The road heads north into business areas and curves northeast, entering the borough of Mount Pocono. The route passes a few shopping centers before it runs between a warehouse to the north and homes and businesses to the south, coming to an intersection with PA 611 and the southern terminus of PA 196. At this point, PA 940 heads south for a short concurrency with PA 611 on four-lane divided Pocono Boulevard before splitting east onto an unnamed two-lane undivided road. The route passes to the north of a shopping center before heading into forested areas. The road becomes the border between Paradise Township to the north and Mount Pocono to the south before passing under the Delaware-Lackawanna Railroad line and fully entering Paradise Township. PA 940 runs through more dense forests, passing a few homes and businesses before it reaches a junction with the southern terminus of PA 390. The route continues east through forested areas with some homes and comes to its eastern terminus at an intersection with PA 191 in the community of Paradise Valley, where the road heads southeast as part of PA 191.

== History ==
Pennsylvania Route 615
- Location: Pocono Summit – Paradise Valley
- Existed: 1928–1946

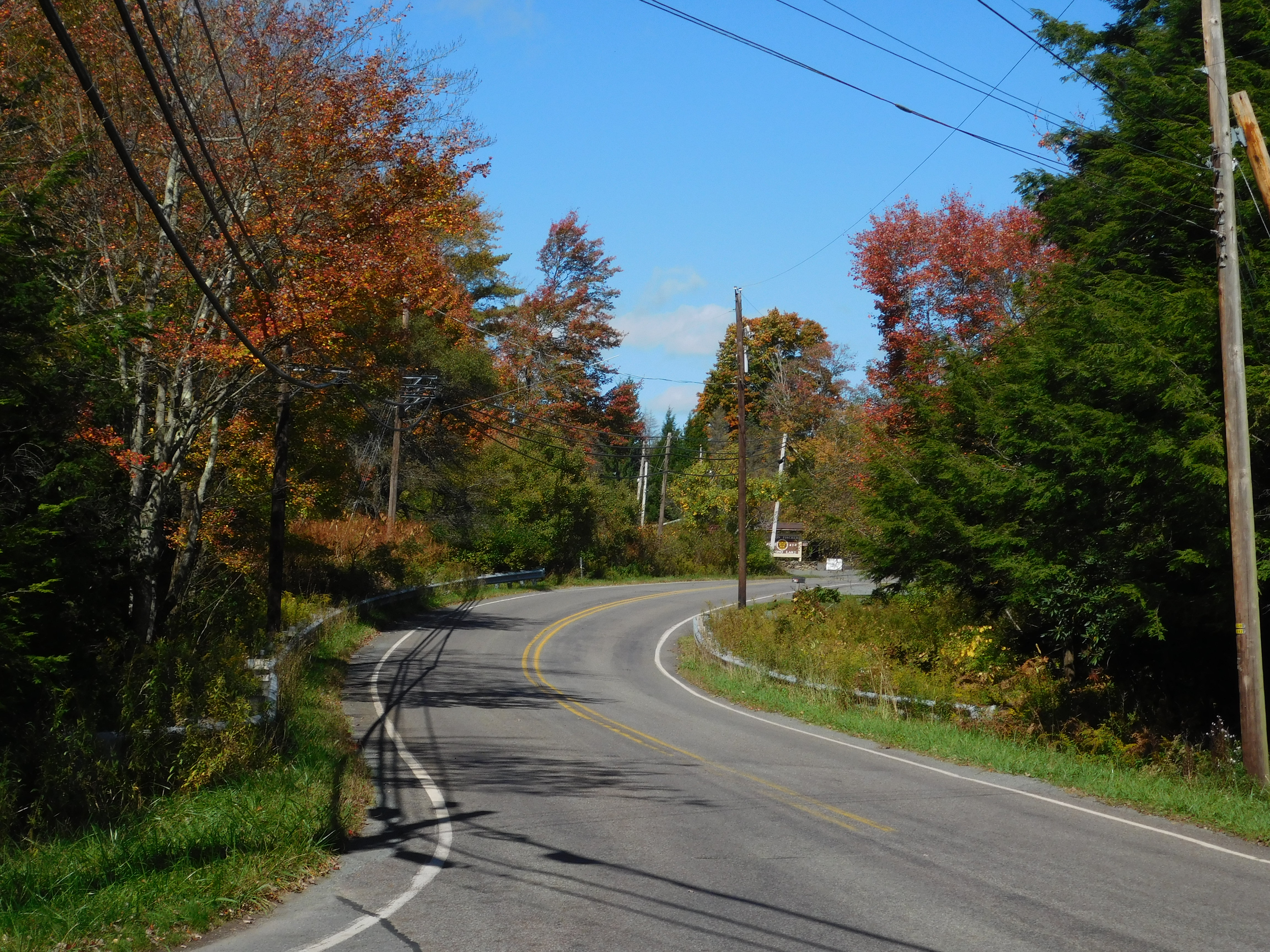
The former alignment of PA 940 in Pocono Lake

When Pennsylvania first legislated routes in 1911, what is now PA 940 became Legislative Route 169 east of Blakeslee, while the road between Pocono Summit and Swiftwater became a part of Legislative Route 171. The highway was designated as part of PA 15 from Blakeslee to Pocono Summit in 1927. In 1928, PA 940 was designated along an unpaved road between White Haven and PA 115 in Blakeslee. PA 115 replaced the PA 15 designation between Blakeslee and Pocono Summit and the road between PA 115 in Pocono Summit and PA 90 (now PA 390) west of Paradise Valley was designated as PA 615. At this time, PA 115 between Blakeslee and Pocono Summit and all of PA 615 was paved. By 1930, the unnumbered road between Hazleton and White Haven was paved. In April 1935, the eastern terminus of PA 940 was extended from Blakeslee to US 611 in Swiftwater, replacing this section of PA 115. By 1940, the road was paved between White Haven and Blakeslee. In 1946, PA 615 was decommissioned and the segment went unnumbered. By 1950, PA 940 was extended west from White Haven to US 309 in Hazleton. In 1956, the segment from Mount Pocono to Paradise Valley was designated as an extension of PA 196. PA 940 near Pocono Summit was upgraded to a divided highway in 1964; as a result the PA 196 designation between Mount Pocono and Paradise Valley was removed and PA 940 was rerouted and extended to an intersection with PA 191 in Paradise Valley. The former alignment of PA 940 between Pocono Summit and Swiftwater became the western portion of PA 314.

== Major intersections ==
County	Location	mi	km	Destinations	Notes
Luzerne	Hazleton	0.000	0.000	PA 309 (North Church Street)	Western terminus
Luzerne	White Haven	13.905	22.378	I-80 – Hazleton, Stroudsburg	Exit 273 on I-80
Luzerne	White Haven	14.287	22.993	PA 437 north (Church Street) – Mountain Top, Wilkes-Barre	Southern terminus of PA 437
Carbon	East Side–Kidder Township line	15.970	25.701	PA 534 east to I-80 – Lehigh Tannery, Hickory Run State Park	Western terminus of PA 534
Carbon	Kidder Township	18.440	29.676	I-80 / I-476 Toll / Penna Turnpike NE Extension – Hazleton, Stroudsburg, Scranton, Allentown	Exit 277 on I-80; exit 95 (Pocono) on I-476 / Penna Turnpike NE Extension
Monroe	Tobyhanna Township	24.830	39.960	PA 115 to I-80 – Wilkes-Barre, Brodheadsville	
Monroe	Tobyhanna Township	32.399	52.141	PA 423 north – Tobyhanna, South Sterling	Southern terminus of PA 423
Monroe	Tobyhanna Township	36.393	58.569	I-380 to I-80 – Scranton, Stroudsburg, Hazleton	Exit 3 on I-380
Monroe	Tobyhanna Township	37.126	59.749	PA 314 – Pocono Summit, Pocono Manor	Interchange
Monroe	Mount Pocono	38.986	62.742	PA 196 north (Sterling Road) / PA 611 north (Pocono Boulevard) – Hamlin, Tobyhanna, Scranton	Western end of PA 611 concurrency; southern terminus of PA 196
Monroe	Mount Pocono	39.050	62.845	PA 611 south (Pocono Boulevard) – Stroudsburg	Eastern end of PA 611 concurrency
Monroe	Paradise Township	42.005	67.600	PA 390 north – Cresco, Mountainhome	Southern terminus of PA 390
Monroe	Paradise Township	43.208	69.537	PA 191 (Paradise Valley Road) – Cresco, Stroudsburg	Eastern terminus
1.000 mi = 1.609 km; 1.000 km = 0.621 mi: Concurrency terminus

== PA 940 Truck ==
Pennsylvania Route 940 Truck
- Location: Tobyhanna Township
- Existed: 2013–2016

Pennsylvania Route 940 Truck (PA 940 Truck) was a truck route of PA 940 that bypassed a weight-restricted bridge over the Tobyhanna Creek in Pocono Lake located in Tobyhanna Township, on which trucks over 30 tons and combination loads over 40 tons are prohibited. The route followed PA 115, I-80, and I-380. It was signed in 2013, but it was decommissioned in 2016 following a bridge repair.
