= Pocono Lake Preserve, Pennsylvania =

Unincorporated community in Pennsylvania, US

- Unincorporated community
- Location within Pennsylvania Location within the United States
- Coordinates: 41°06′08″N 75°31′39″W
- Country: United States
- State: Pennsylvania
- County: Monroe
- Township: Tobyhanna
- Elevation: 1,673 ft (510 m)
- Time zone: UTC-5 (Eastern (EST))
  - Summer (DST): UTC-4 (EDT)
- ZIP code: 18348
- Area codes: 570 and 272
- GNIS feature ID: 1184148

Pocono Lake Preserve is an unincorporated private development located in Tobyhanna Township in Monroe County, Pennsylvania. Pocono Lake Preserve is located on the north shore of Pocono Lake, south of Pennsylvania Route 940 between Blakeslee and Pocono Pines.
