= Jonas Christman =

American local official and magistrate (1816–1890)

- The Christman family farmhouse in Pocono Lake, Pennsylvania, constructed circa 1870.
- Born: March 10, 1816; Lower Macungie Township, Pennsylvania, U.S.
- Died: July 26, 1890 (aged 74); Pocono Lake, Pennsylvania, U.S.
- Resting place: Pocono Lake Cemetery, Monroe County, Pennsylvania, U.S.
- Occupations: Magistrate, judicial official, township supervisor
- Spouse: Mary Anna Albitz (m. 1841)
- Children: 8, including William Henry Christman

Jonas Christman (March 10, 1816 – July 26, 1890) was an American municipal official, regional magistrate, and farmer in Monroe County, Pennsylvania. Active in local government and judicial roles in Tobyhanna Township for several decades, he is historically recognized as the father of Private William Henry Christman, the first soldier interred at Arlington National Cemetery.

Born in Lehigh County, Pennsylvania, to a Pennsylvania German family, Christman relocated with his wife, Mary Anna Albitz, to the Pocono Mountains during the 1840s. The family endured severe financial and physical hardship following an 1860 wagon accident and the loss of two sons, Barnabus and William Henry, during the American Civil War. Using military bounty money sent home by William Henry to clear his debts, Christman established a homestead in Pocono Lake—a property later documented by the Pennsylvania Historical and Museum Commission—where he served as a township supervisor and operated a justice of the peace court from his farmhouse parlor for nearly twenty years.

== Early life and family heritage ==
Christman was born in Lower Macungie Township, Lehigh County, Pennsylvania, to Johann George Christman and Sara Fegely. He belonged to the fourth generation of his family in America, descending from the immigrant patriarch Jacob Christman. Several members of his family served in the military; his grandfather Henry Christman served in the Pennsylvania Militia during the American Revolutionary War, and his father served in defensive units during the War of 1812. Following his father's death in December 1840, the Lehigh County Orphans' Court appointed an administrator in 1841 to manage the estate among Christman and his six siblings.

== Marriage and northern migration ==
On May 9, 1841, Christman married Mary Anna Albitz in Bally, Berks County. The couple migrated north into Monroe County during the 1840s, settling permanently on the Pocono Mountain Plateau in Tobyhanna Township. In the late 1850s and 1860s, the family experienced financial and medical difficulties, including chronic rheumatism that cost Christman the use of one arm, a foreclosed 89-acre timber tract, and a severe 1860 wagon accident that fractured his right hip. While he was largely bedridden, Mary Anna supported the family through midwifery, gathering wild herbs, and managing farm duties.

== Civil War and family ==
Christman served on local jury panels and was registered on the Pocono Township Military Enrollment List on March 31, 1864. Two of his sons died during the conflict: Private Barnabus F. Christman of the 4th Pennsylvania Reserve Infantry was killed in action at the Battle of New Market Cross Roads on June 30, 1862, while Private William Henry Christman of the 67th Pennsylvania Volunteers enlisted in early 1864, received a government bounty, and sent money home to help his financially struggling family. William Henry died of illness at Lincoln General Hospital on May 11, 1864, and two days later became the first military interment at Arlington National Cemetery; Christman's poverty and disability prevented him from traveling to Washington to attend the burial.

== Post-war civic and judicial career ==
Historians believe that Christman used the bounty money sent home by his son to clear his debts and buy a 40-acre (16 ha) property in Pocono Lake, where he erected a farmhouse and log barn around 1870. The property was later documented by the Pennsylvania Historical and Museum Commission as part of the state's cultural resources database.

Christman held several local government and judicial positions:

- Served as Tobyhanna Township supervisor in 1869, and held several other municipal offices in Tobyhanna Township between 1867 and 1874, including election inspector (1867), overseer of the poor (1867), tax collector (1870, 1872), township assessor (1872–1874), and town clerk (1872–1873).
- Elected justice of the peace, with commissions certified by Pennsylvania Governors John W. Geary (1871), Henry M. Hoyt (1881), and James A. Beaver (1887).
- Operated a magistrate courtroom from his farmhouse parlor for nearly two decades, arbitrating disputes and performing marriages.
- Served on county grand and petit jury pools over more than four decades, with selections continuing into his seventies.
- Delivered U.S. mail via a local horse team under contractor Isaac Stauffer, starting part-time in 1864 and working full-time by 1870.

== Children and later family history ==
Christman and his wife raised eight children. Daughters Anna Maria, Emeline, and Mary Catharina reached adulthood on the homestead. Sophia died at age 16 in 1875, and Timothy continued the family line in the Poconos. In January 1896, youngest son John F. Christman purchased the family farmhouse for $500 under a formal maintenance deed requiring him to provide his widowed mother with lifelong care.

== Death and estate legal history ==
Gravestone of Jonas Christman at Pocono Lake Cemetery in Tobyhanna Township, Monroe County, Pennsylvania

Christman died on July 26, 1890, and was buried at the Pocono Lake Cemetery. Following his passing and the later death of his widow, his surviving children initiated property partition suits in the Orphans' Court to divide the family acreage among the heirs. These title evaluations and legal proceedings spanned from 1909 until the final probate account closure in September 1921.
