= Lake Harmony, Pennsylvania =

Unincorporated community in Pennsylvania, US

- Unincorporated community
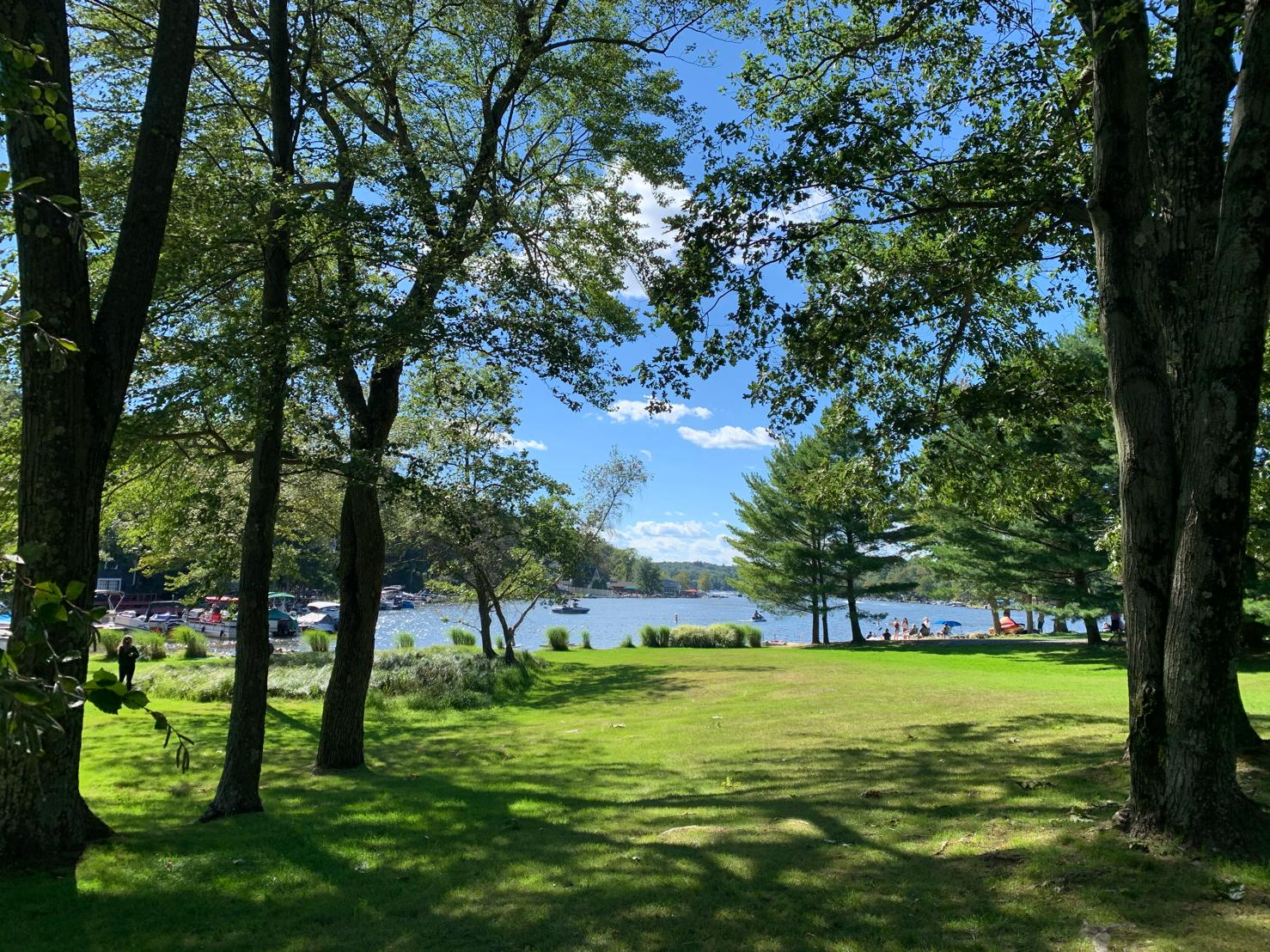
- Lake Harmony as seen from Lake Harmony Inn

- Location within the U.S. state of Pennsylvania Lake Harmony (the United States)
- Coordinates: 40°59′59″N 75°42′29″W
- Country: United States
- State: Pennsylvania
- County: Carbon
- Township: Kidder
- Elevation: 1,329 ft (405 m)

Population (2010)
  - Total: 718
- Time zone: UTC-5 (EST)
  - Summer (DST): UTC-4 (EDT)
- ZIP code: 18624
- Area code(s): 570
- GNIS feature ID: 1178778

Lake Harmony is an unincorporated community in Kidder Township, Carbon County, Pennsylvania, United States. The population was 549 at the 2020 census. It is served by ZIP code 18624.

== History ==
In 1913, Frederick Charles Brenckman wrote:

The region about Lake Harmony has in recent years become quite popular as a summer resort. Numerous cottages or bungalows have been erected, principally by people from Mauch Chunk and Allentown, while many, lured by the cool breezes and quietness of the retreat, spend a portion of the heated term of each year as campers on the shores of the lake.

The Split Rock Lodge at Lake Harmony was originally a private retreat for the executives of the Lehigh Coal and Navigation Company, but much of the land was sold to developers. The lodge was destroyed by fire in 1970. A portion of the building survived the blaze, and it was rebuilt and sold to Village Square, Incorporated. After several changes in ownership, current ownership since 2020 is held by Mexico-based Bel Air Collection Resorts & Spas, itself owned and operated by Thy Collection. Bel Air Collections promised numerous renovations throughout the resort, from room redesigns to refurbished fitness areas to bar and restaurant amenities. A spokesman for the company stated in 2022 that COVID-19 delayed progress on the renovations. Lawsuits in 2023 suggest that progress in some areas of renovations have ground to a halt or even regressed, with timeshare owners alleging false advertising practices by Bel Air.

== Geography ==
According to the U.S. Census Bureau, Lake Harmony has a total area of 16.9 square miles (43.9 km^{2}), 16.5 square miles (42.7 km^{2}) of which is land and 0.46 square miles (1.2 km^{2}) of which is water. The community is located of the shores of the eponymous Lake Harmony. It has a warm-summer humid continental climate (Dfb) and average monthly temperatures range from 22.2 °F in January to 68.0 °F in July. The hardiness zone is 5b.

== Demographics ==
Historical population
Census	Pop.	Note	%±
2000	439		—
2010	718		63.6%
2020	549		−23.5%

Lake Harmony is neither an incorporated area nor a census-designated place, all the data is for the ZIP code 18624. As of the census of 2010, there were 718 people, 359 households, and 203 families residing in the community. The population density was 43.5 people per square mile (6.6/km^{2}). There were 1,594 housing units at an average density of 96.6 per square mile (37.3/km^{2}). The racial makeup of the community was 95.8% White, 1.7% African American, 0.1% Native American, 0.7% Asian, 1.0% from other races, and 0.7% from two or more races. Hispanic or Latino of any race were 3.1% of the population.

Updated data suggests a decline in population; in 2016, there was an estimated population of 540 people, 359 occupied housing units out of 1,594, and 168 families. Population density is 45 people per square mile. The racial makeup of the community remains overwhelmingly white at 95.8%, 1.7% African American, 0.1% Native American, 0.7% Asian, 0% Native Hawaiian and Pacific Islander, 1% other races, and 0.7% two or more races.

There were 359 households, out of which 14.8% had children under the age of 18 living with them, 46.8% were married couples living together, 5.6% had a female householder with no husband present, and 43.5% were non-families. Out of all the households, 7.5% had someone living alone who was 65 years of age or older. The average household size was 2.0 and the average family size was 2.61. 69.95 of the housing units were for seasonal, recreational, or occasional use.

In the community, the population was spread out, with 14.4% under the age of 18, 4.7% from 19 to 24, 18.2% from 25 to 44, 37.4% from 45 to 64, and 25.3% who were 65 years of age or older. The median age was 52 years. The gender distribution was 52.9% male and 47.1% female.

According to the American Community Survey in 2013, the median income for a household in the community was $61,563, and the median income for a family was $62,500.
