= Kidder Township, Pennsylvania =

Township in Pennsylvania, US

Kidder Township
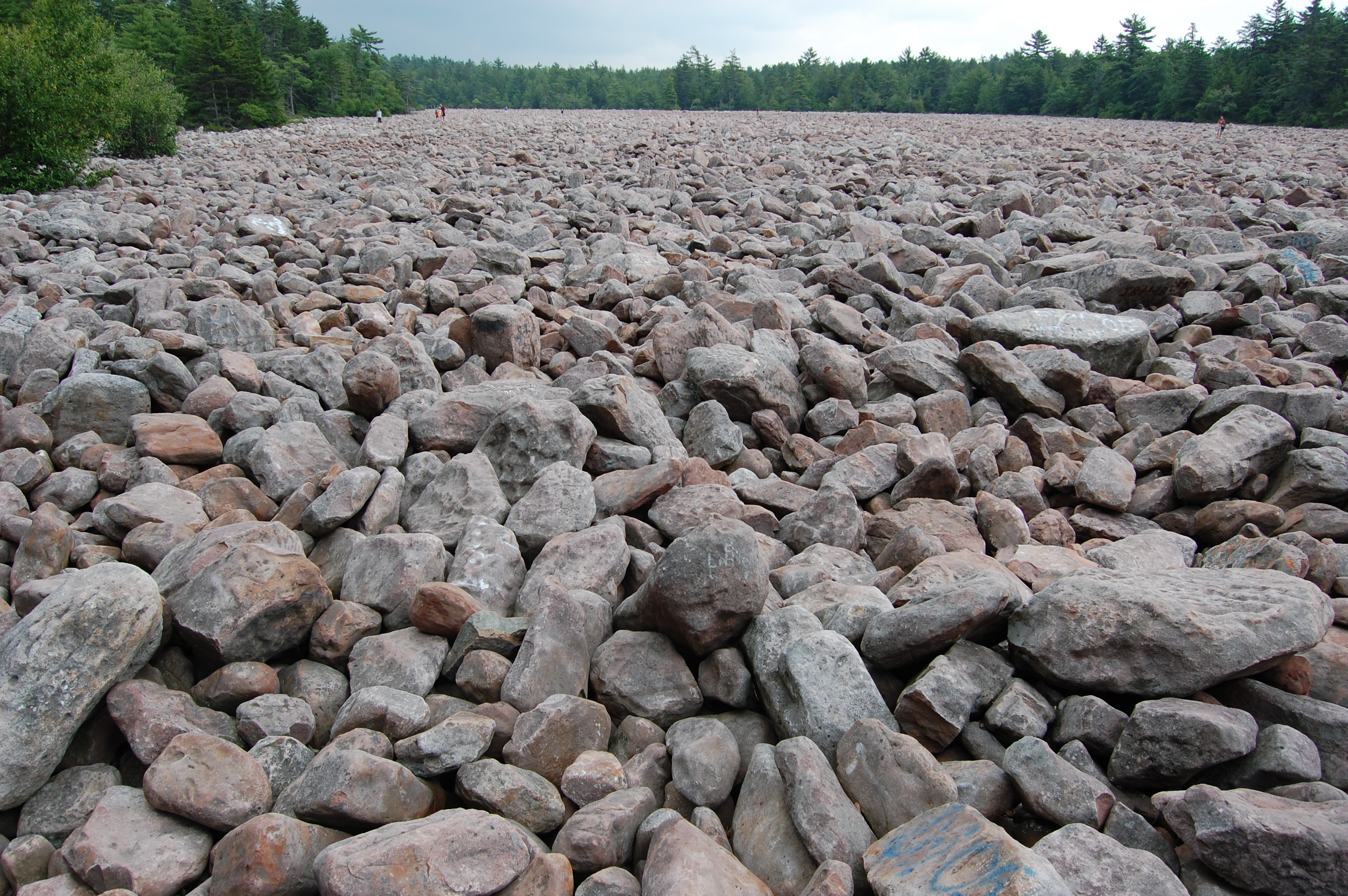
- Boulder field at Hickory Run State Park, July 2007
- Motto(s): "A nice place to live, work, play!!"
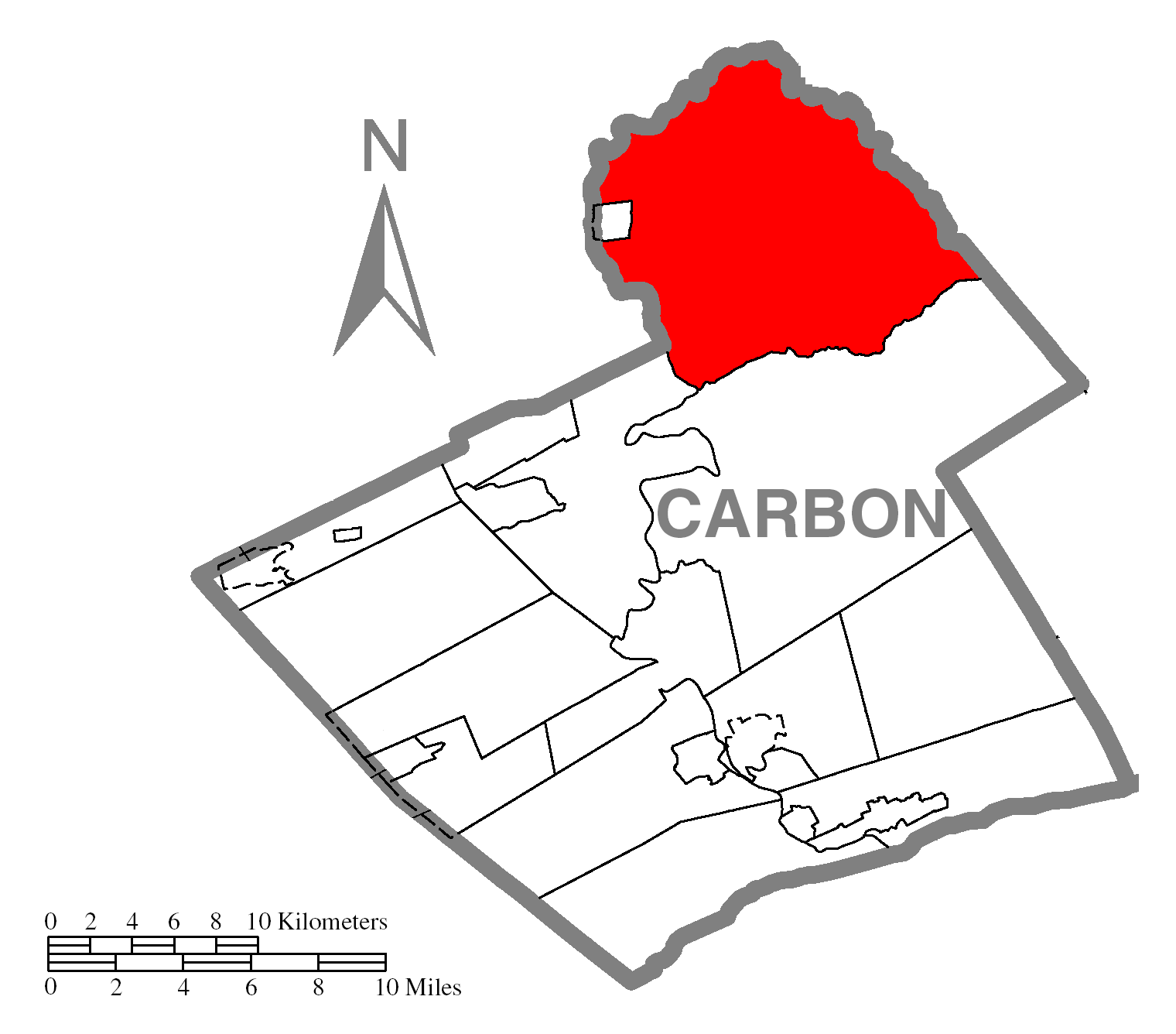
- Location of Kidder Township in Carbon County

- Location of Carbon County in Pennsylvania
- Coordinates: 40°59′59″N 75°42′29″W
- Country: United States
- State: Pennsylvania
- County: Carbon

Area
  - Total: 69.80 sq mi (180.78 km^{2})
  - Land: 69.07 sq mi (178.90 km^{2})
  - Water: 0.72 sq mi (1.87 km^{2})
- Elevation: 1,329 ft (405 m)

Population (2010)
  - Total: 1,935
  - Estimate (2016): 1,930
  - Density: 27.9/sq mi (10.79/km^{2})
- Time zone: UTC-5 (EST)
  - Summer (DST): UTC-4 (EDT)
- Area code(s): 570
- FIPS code: 42-025-39608
- Website: www.kiddertownship.org

Kidder Township is a township in Carbon County, Pennsylvania. It is part of Northeastern Pennsylvania. The population was 1,935 at the 2010 census, up from 1,185 at the 2000 census.

== History ==
On October 10, 1888, a train wreck known as the Mud Run disaster occurred on the Lehigh Valley Railroad which runs through the township. 66 people were killed, most members of the Total Abstinence Union returning from a rally.

== Geography ==
Kidder Township occupies the northern end of Carbon County and is bordered by Luzerne County to the north and west and by Monroe County to the east. It is drained by the Lehigh River, which separates it from Luzerne County. Tobyhanna Creek, a tributary of the Lehigh, forms the northern half of the township's eastern border. Its villages include Albrightsville (also in Penn Forest Township), Hickory Run, Lake Harmony, Lehigh Tannery, Leonardsville/Pocono Mountain Lake Estates, and Split Rock. Albrightsville is a census-designated place as is Holiday Pocono within Kidder.

According to the U.S. Census Bureau, the township has a total area of 69.8 square miles (180.8 km^{2}), of which 69.1 square miles (178.9 km^{2}) is land and 0.73 square miles (1.9 km^{2}), or 1.04%, is water. Hickory Run State Park occupies nearly 16,000 acres (65 km^{2}) in the southern half of the township.

=== Neighboring municipalities ===
- Penn Forest Township (south)
- Lehigh Township (southwest)
- Foster Township, Luzerne County (west)
- White Haven, Luzerne County (west)
- East Side (west)
- Dennison Township, Luzerne County (west)
- Bear Creek Township, Luzerne County (northwest)
- Buck Township, Luzerne County (north)
- Tobyhanna Township, Monroe County (northeast)
- Tunkhannock Township, Monroe County (east)

=== Climate ===
The township has a warm-summer humid continental climate (Dfb) and the hardiness zone is mostly 5b except for a little 6a along Mud Run and the Lehigh River. The average monthly temperatures at the Pocono interchange of the Turnpike range from 22.9 °F in January to 68.3 °F in July.

== Demographics ==
Historical population
Census	Pop.	Note	%±
2000	1,185		—
2010	1,935		63.3%
2016 (est.)	1,930		−0.3%
U.S. Decennial Census

As of the census of 2000, there were 1,185 people, 498 households, and 347 families residing in the township. The population density was 17.2 people per square mile (6.6/km^{2}). There were 2,197 housing units at an average density of 31.8 per square mile (12.3/km^{2}). The racial makeup of the township was 93.25% White, 2.36% African American, 0.08% Native American, 0.17% Asian, 1.35% from other races, and 2.78% from two or more races. Hispanic or Latino of any race were 4.56% of the population.

There were 498 households, out of which 21.5% had children under the age of 18 living with them, 57.4% were married couples living together, 7.4% had a female householder with no husband present, and 30.3% were non-families. 25.3% of all households were made up of individuals, and 8.6% had someone living alone who was 65 years of age or older. The average household size was 2.28 and the average family size was 2.69.

In the township, the population was spread out, with 21.3% under the age of 18, 5.7% from 18 to 24, 23.4% from 25 to 44, 31.7% from 45 to 64, and 18.0% who were 65 years of age or older. The median age was 45 years. For every 100 females, there were 110.9 males. For every 100 females age 18 and over, there were 102.4 males.

The median income for a household in the township was $32,583, and the median income for a family was $37,404. Males had a median income of $30,714 versus $26,250 for females. The per capita income for the township was $18,719. About 9.5% of families and 10.1% of the population were below the poverty line, including 9.8% of those under age 18 and 10.5% of those age 65 or over.

== Transportation ==
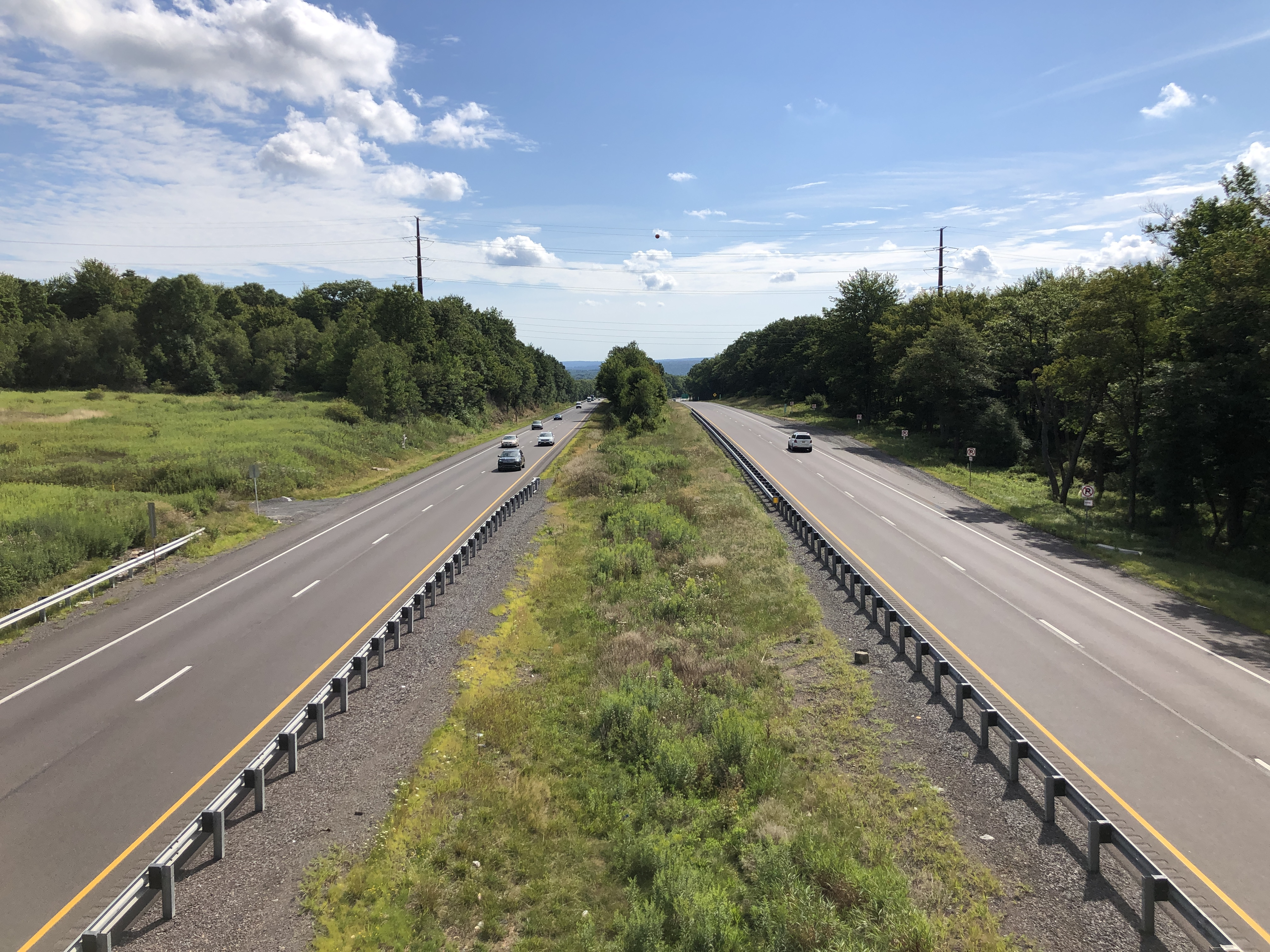
I-80 eastbound in Kidder Township

As of 2015, there were 40.77 miles (65.61 km) of public roads in Kidder Township, of which 9.40 miles (15.13 km) were maintained by the Pennsylvania Turnpike Commission (PTC), 26.18 miles (42.13 km) were maintained by the Pennsylvania Department of Transportation (PennDOT) and 5.19 miles (8.35 km) were maintained by the township.

Kidder Township is served by two Interstate highways. Interstate 476, the Pennsylvania Turnpike's Northeast Extension, passes north–south through the township while Interstate 80 passes east–west through the township. The two highways meet at the Pocono interchange. State highways serving Kidder Township include Pennsylvania Route 534, which passes east–west through the southern portion of the township, intersecting Pennsylvania Route 903 in Albrightsville; PA 903, which passes through the southeast corner of the township on its way between Jim Thorpe and Route 115 just beyond the Monroe County line; and Pennsylvania Route 940, which passes east–west through the northern portion of the township parallel to I-80 and connects to I-80 and I-476 at the Pocono interchange.

Kidder has one more important road, which connects 903 and 940 via Lake Harmony and Split Rock. The portion between Split Rock and 940, Moseywood Road, is a private toll road operated by Vacation Charters Limited, and the portion south to 903 is Lake Drive.

Martz Trailways has a stop in Kidder Township near the Pocono interchange of Interstate 476 for service between Scranton, Wilkes-Barre, Allentown, Quakertown, and Philadelphia. This is an Amtrak Thruway route, connecting to Amtrak trains at 30th Street Station in Philadelphia. Martz also operates casino bus routes to Atlantic City from the stop.

The Reading Blue Mountain and Northern Railroad's Lehigh Division line pass through the western portion of Kidder Township.
