= William Henry Christman =

American Civil War soldier (1844–1864)

William Christman
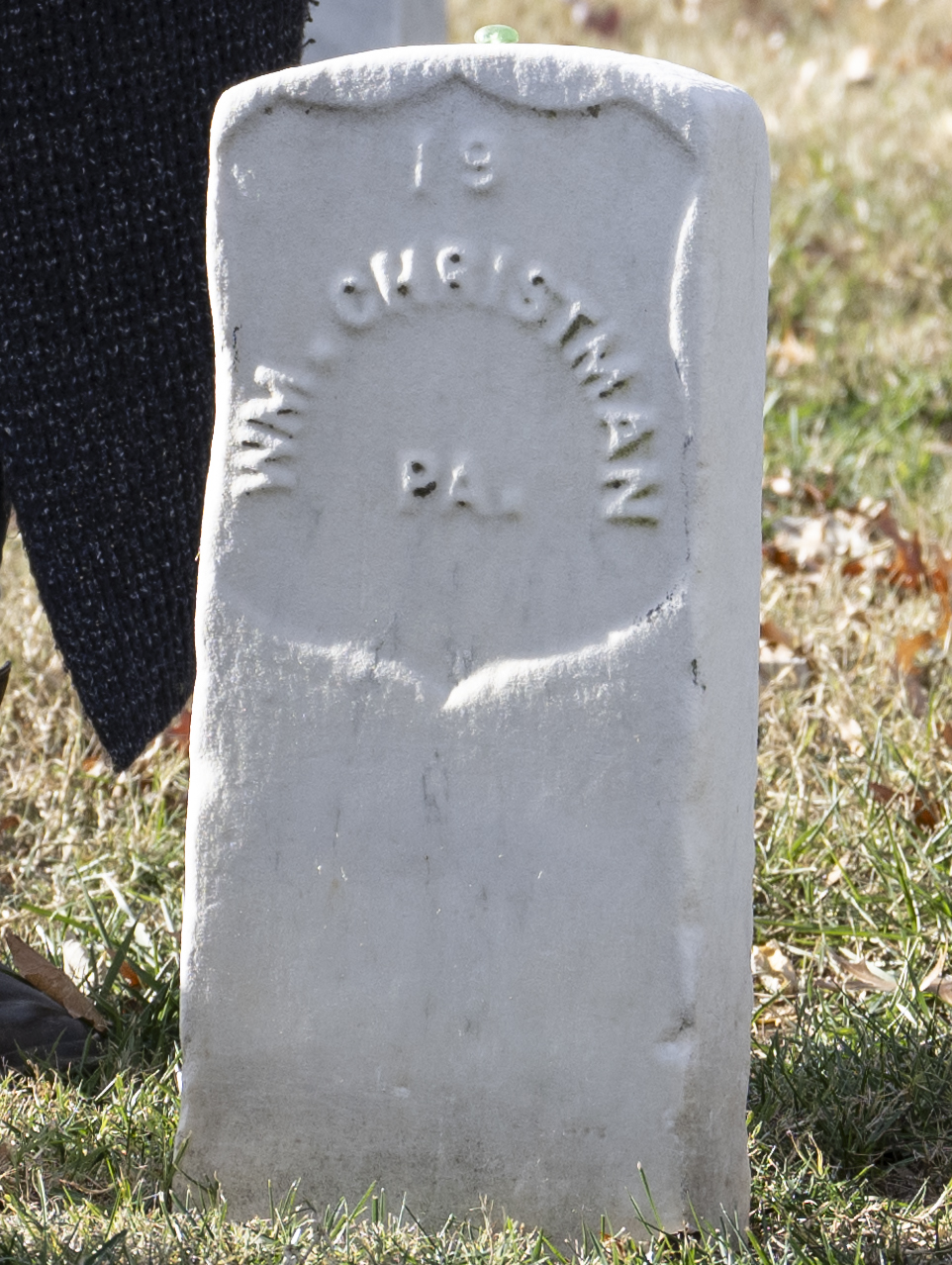
- Grave at Arlington National Cemetery
- Born: William Henry Christman; October 1, 1844; Pennsylvania, US
- Died: May 11, 1864 (aged 19); Arlington County, Virginia, US
- Resting place: Arlington National Cemetery; 38.887°N 77.068°W
- Known for: First soldier buried at Arlington National Cemetery
- Parents: Jonas Christman; Mary Anna Albitz
- Military career
- Allegiance: United States
- Branch: United States Army
- Service years: 1864
- Rank: Private
- Unit: 67th Pennsylvania Volunteer Infantry Regiment
- Conflicts: American Civil War

William Henry Christman (October 1, 1844 – May 11, 1864) was a private in the United States Army who was the first soldier buried at Arlington National Cemetery during the American Civil War. Born to Jonas Christman and Mary Anna Albitz, Christman was a laborer from Pocono Lake, Pennsylvania. He joined Company G of the 67th Pennsylvania Infantry Regiment on March 25, 1864. On May 1, he was hospitalized with the measles at Lincoln General Hospital. Private Christman died on May 11, 1864 of peritonitis and was buried two days later on May 13, 1864. He was the first Union soldier to be buried in Arlington National Cemetery on May 13, 1864. His remains rest in Arlington National Cemetery's Section 27, grave 19.
