= Japan, Pennsylvania =

Village in Pennsylvania, United States

Coordinates: 40°59′33″N 75°54′37″W

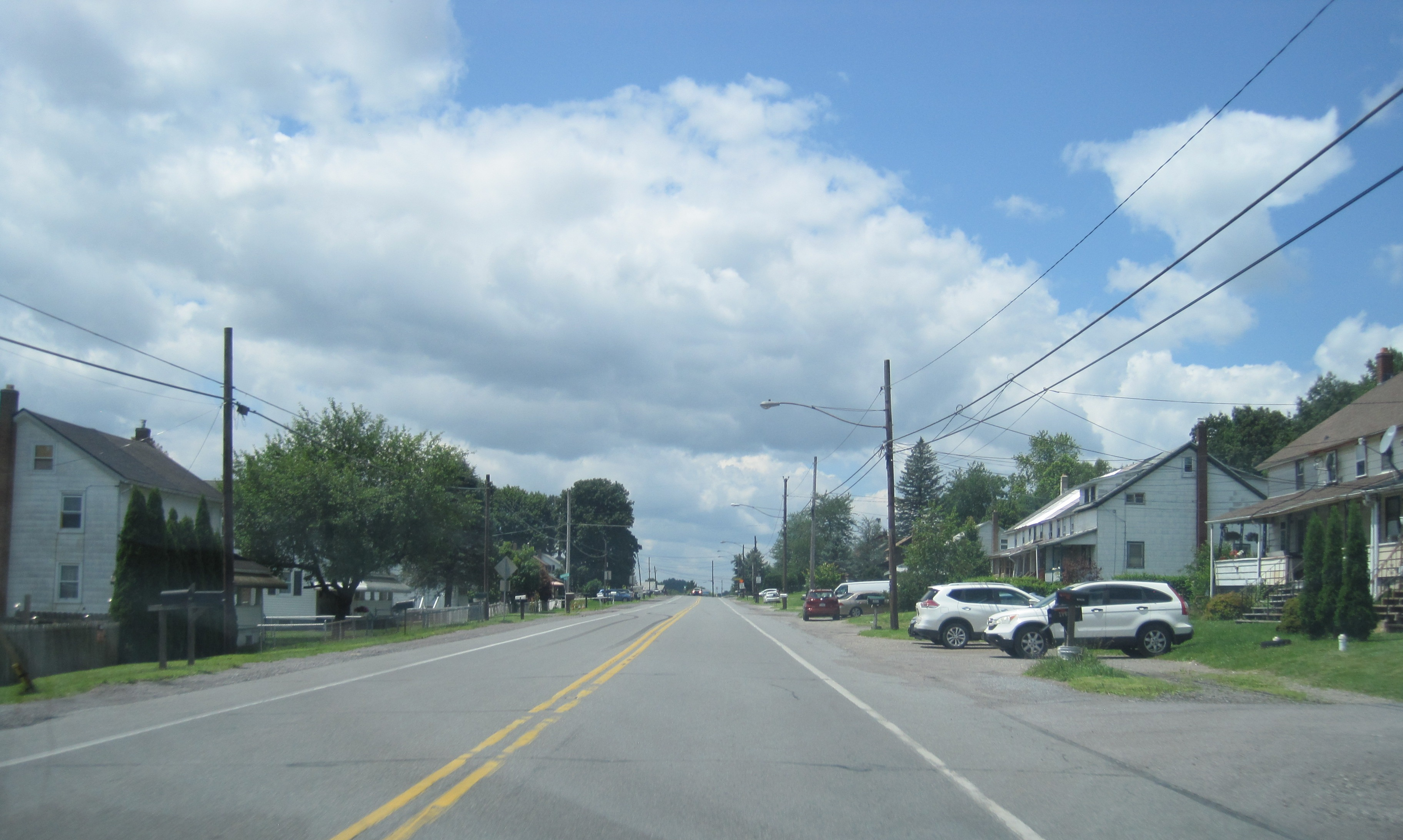
Photo looking west along PA 490

Japan is a small village in eastern Hazle Township, Luzerne County, Pennsylvania, located on Route 940. It is located just west of the borough of Jeddo and these two names were designated by the Hazleton Coal Company, which used the Japanese port of Jeddo. It is drained by the Black Creek, a tributary of the Nescopeck Creek, westward into the Susquehanna River. It is split between the Hazleton zip codes of 18201 and 18202.
