= Lake Harmony =

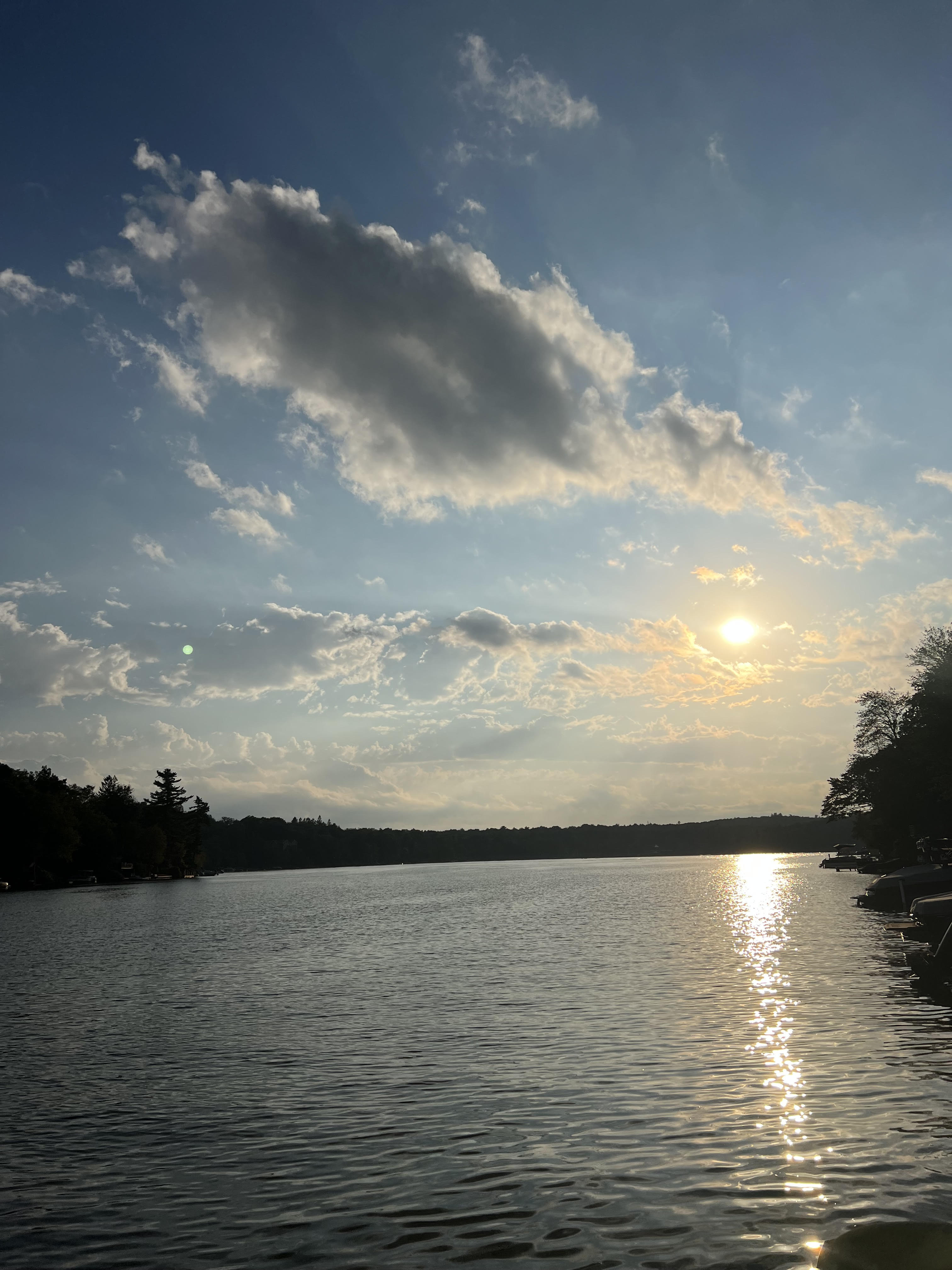

- Location within Pennsylvania Location within the United States
- Location: Carbon County, Pennsylvania
- Coordinates: 41°03′36″N 075°35′33″W
- Type: natural lake
- Primary inflows: spring
- Primary outflows: overflow at eastern end of lake
- Basin countries: United States
- Surface elevation: 1,841 ft (561 m)

Lake Harmony is a glacial lake in Kidder Township, Pennsylvania. The lake is drained by the Tobyhanna Creek, which flows northwest into the Lehigh River. It shares its name with an adjacent village, which has a ZIP code of 18624. Despite misconceptions, the lake is not accessible to the general public. Lake Harmony is a privately owned, non-navigable lake.

== Background ==
Ownership of Lake Harmony's lake bed is divided between two entities, Split Rock Resort (20%) and the Lake Harmony Group (80%). The Lake Harmony Group – a non-profit corporation formed by the Lake Harmony Association and Lake Harmony Estates – additionally owns a number of paper roads which provide lake access to members of the Lake Harmony Association and Lake Harmony Estates. The Lake Harmony Group has the responsibility to preserve, control, and maintain the environmental integrity and recreational use of Lake Harmony. Among other things, LHG is responsible for rules and regulations for the safe commercial and non-commercial use of the lake and the paper streets, storm water management, maintenance of the lake and paper streets, lake water quality, ownership and placement of navigational buoys, and licensing of boat slips. A major project undertaken by the LHG is the installation in the lake of a Clean Flo system of aerators, which has had a demonstrated success in increasing lake water levels and improving ecosystem health.
