= Quicktown, Pennsylvania =

Unincorporated community in Pennsylvania, U.S.

Coordinates: 41°21′59″N 75°27′13″W

Quicktown is a rural unincorporated community in Lackawanna County in the U.S. state of Pennsylvania. It is located approximately 17 miles (27 km) east of Scranton, more specifically in the eastern portion of Madison Township (known to the locals as Madisonville). Madison Twp (Madisonville) was formed on August 7, 1849, from parts of Covington and Jefferson townships and is named after President James Madison.

== History ==
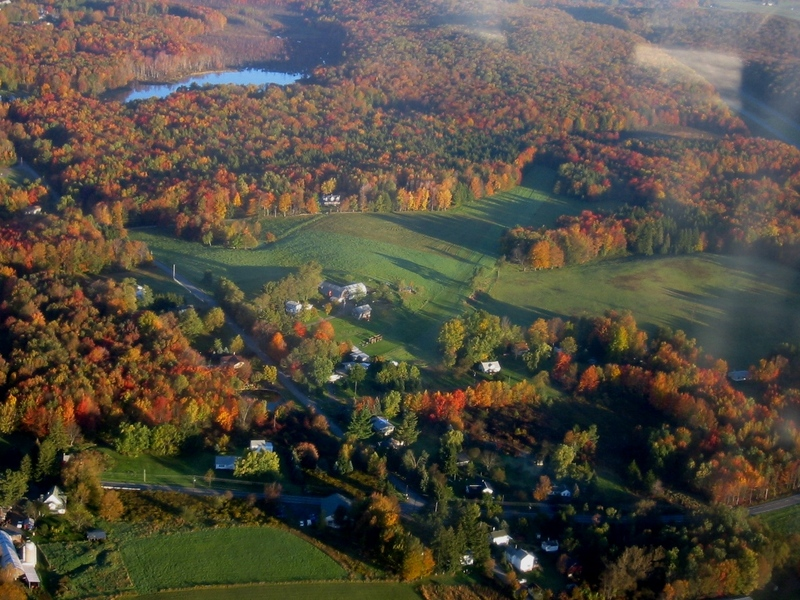
Aerial photo of Quicktown in 2006

Shown on most printed maps about 1.2 miles (1.9 km) northeast of Madisonville corners, Quicktown is located at Quicktown Corners at the intersection of Quicktown Road and PA Route 690. This intersection was previously known as Carey's Corners after the Carey family that lived near the intersection. The Carey family no longer resides in the area, but was still present up until at least 1930 according to that census.

Quicktown is named after the Quick family that lived in the area, but there are no records of Quicks that actually resided in Madison township in the census records other than Matilda Quick, a school teacher boarding with George Weldy in 1880. Rather the records show that the family and descendants of Daniel Thomas Quick (1824–1911) and Almira J Pedrick Quick living just across the county line in Hollisterville, part of Salem Township in Wayne County. Daniel came from Pike County near Milford and first appeared in Salem in the 1860 census. Daniel's son used the address of Hollisterville on his World War I draft registration.

The original settlers in what would become Madison Township were Thomas Biesecker and Richard Edwards, who both arrived in 1825. Horace Hollister names "John Besecker" (not Thomas) and Richard Edwards among the original settlers in Drinker's Beech in History of the Lackawanna Valley. Census records support Hollister's claim that it was John Biesecker and Richard Edwards. There is no census entry for any Thomas Biesecker in Luzerne County, Pennsylvania prior to the formation of Lackawanna County, but John Biesecker is in Lower Mount Bethel in Northampton County, Pennsylvania in the 1820 census and in Covington in the 1830 census. However, neither of these original settlers lived in the area considered Quicktown.

The first settler in the Quicktown area is unknown. It was likely Alfred Wilcox, Benjamin Pedrick or Benjamin Parker Carey (1819–1873). Alfred Wilcox and Benjamin Pedrick both appear in the 1840 census in Jefferson before Madison Township was formed. Both lived in or near Quicktown in 1850 and both appear on the 1873 Madison map (see below). Wilcox lived about where I-84 now passes under Rt. 690. Pedrick lived about where Flip's Market is now located. Benjamin Pedrick is also the father of Almira Pedrick, the wife of Daniel Quick (mentioned above). According to the article, "The Settlers of Drinker's Beech" by G. Ellis Miller, Benjamin Parker Carey (or Cary), a carpenter and the son of Minor Carey and Sarah Robinson of Old Providence Township, was the first settler at Carey's Corner. He settled there sometime between 1840 and 1850. His home was at the Southern corner of Quicktown Corners.

According to family records and census data, John Biesecker's son in law, Peter Alt (1797-1891), born in Bavaria, Germany, was also an early settler in Quicktown. The Alts moved from Salem, Pennsylvania, to Quicktown in 1847, buying a farm from Balser Fetherman. Records suggest that the Fethermans never lived on this property.

The Swartz family was certainly one of the earliest families to settle Quicktown, although the original Swartzes in Madisonville, George and Jacob, seem to have settled in parts of Madisonville that are outside what is usually considered Quicktown.

By 1850, census records show the Alt, Dings, Hornbaker, Pedrick, Swartz, Wilcox families in the area. Of these, only the Pedrick and Wilcox families appear in Jefferson in the 1840 census, but a section is missing that includes the name of one family.

In 1861, Peter Alt sold his property to Joseph and Esther Ellis Mead and moved to Wisconsin. Joseph Mead (1804 -1880) was born in NY, the son of Selah Mead and Tamar Griffen. Esther Ellis (1819 - 1895) was born in Connecticut, the daughter of Isaac S. Ellis and Sarah Ann Pepper. Joseph had been a farmer in Providence, PA prior to buying their farm in Quicktown. The farm is still in the possession of Joseph Mead's descendants.

Peter Alt's son, John Alt, a Civil War veteran, married Sarah Ann Clouse and settled at Carey's Corner where he worked as a blacksmith. Many of their descendants still reside in Quicktown.

Floyd Smith bought property in Quicktown from the Quick family, according to local word-of-mouth. Perhaps Almira Pedrick-Quick inherited the property from her parents, which would explain how Quicks came to own this property. This farm is owned by the Thomas family, descendants of Floyd Smith.

In 1873, "The Corners" had Madisonville Hall, located about where Yonk Mead's former garage stands and John Alt's blacksmith shop across the road. Later, Billy Fuegline built and operated a small one room store at Quicktown Corners. Eventually it was run by Durward "Huck" and Mary June (Alt) Field. The stand sold bread, candy, gasoline etc. and Huck ran a small equipment repair area there too. The stand closed up sometime in the 1950s or 1960s.

The Dings, Hornbaker, Pedrick, Swartz, and Wilcox names have since disappeared from Quicktown. The Alt and Mead families still remain.
