= Quecreek, Pennsylvania =

Unincorporated community in Pennsylvania, US

Quecreek
- Unincorporated community
- Location within the state of Pennsylvania Quecreek (the United States)
- Coordinates: 40°5′23″N 79°4′45″W
- Country: United States
- State: Pennsylvania
- County: Somerset
- Elevation: 1,926 ft (587 m)
- Time zone: UTC-5 (Eastern (EST))
  - Summer (DST): UTC-4 (EDT)
- ZIP codes: 15555
- GNIS feature ID: 1184535

Quecreek is an unincorporated community and coal town in Somerset County, Pennsylvania, United States. It was also known as Harrison. Quemahoning Creek Coal Company operated two mines in Quecreek in 1918. The post office closed in 2005. The 2002 Quecreek Mine rescue occurred nearby.
