= Port Indian, Pennsylvania =

Community in Pennsylvania, U.S.

Coordinates: 40.119829°N 75.391852°W

Port Indian is a small, private boating community located in West Norriton Township, Montgomery County, Pennsylvania, United States.

Its two streets (East Indian Lane and West Indian Lane) and the riverfront homes along them run parallel to the Schuylkill River.

Port Indian hosted the "Port Indian Regatta" for many years until its demise sometime in the 1990s.
