= East Side, Pennsylvania =

Borough in Pennsylvania, US

- Borough
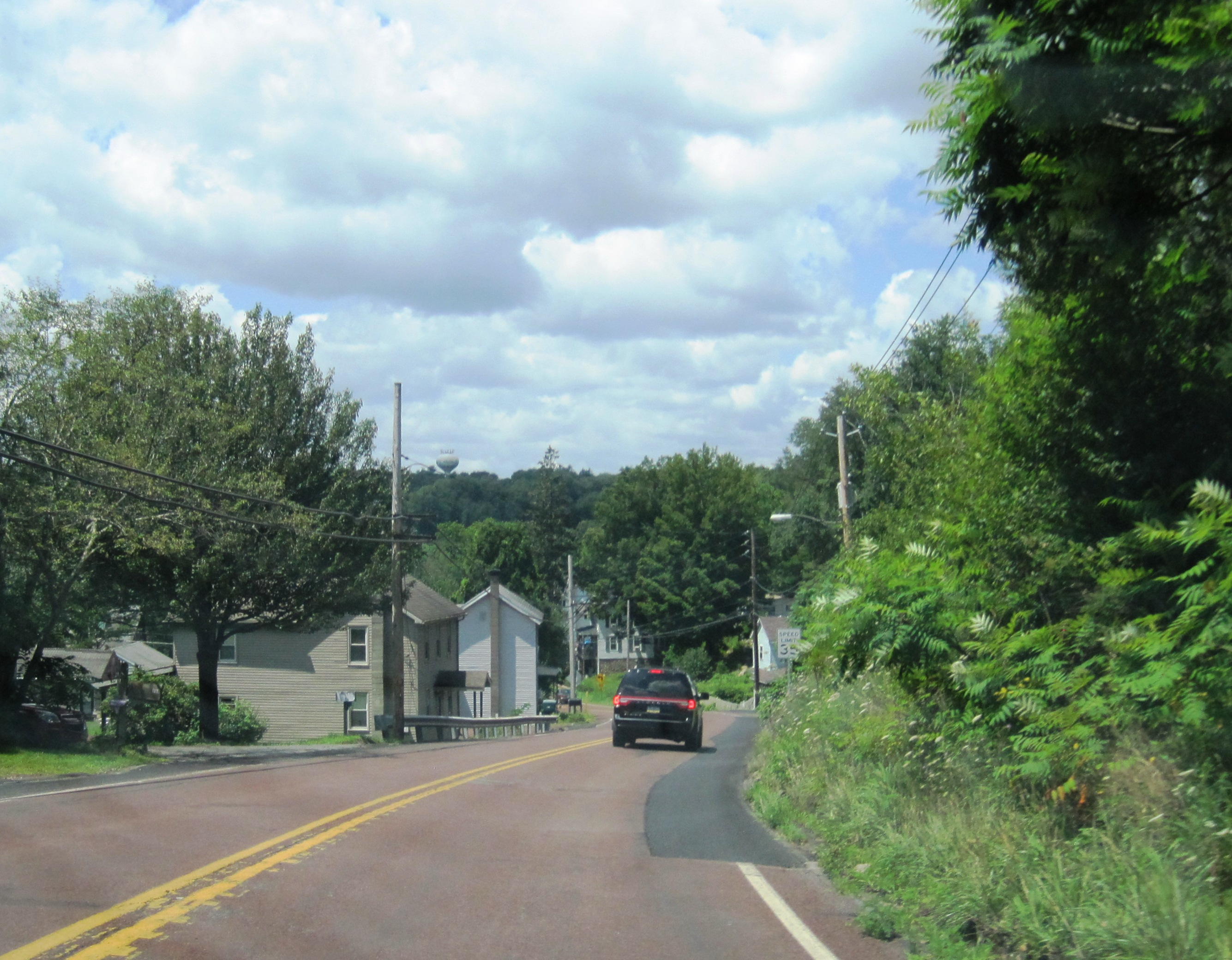
- Pennsylvania Route 940 in East Side, July 2023

- Location of East Side in Carbon County, Pennsylvania.

- Location of East Side in Pennsylvania East Side (the United States)
- Coordinates: 41°03′39″N 75°45′50″W
- Country: United States
- State: Pennsylvania
- County: Carbon

Area
  - Total: 1.16 sq mi (3.00 km^{2})
  - Land: 1.15 sq mi (2.99 km^{2})
  - Water: 0.0039 sq mi (0.01 km^{2})
- Elevation: 1,150 ft (350 m)

Population (2020)
  - Total: 247
  - Density: 214.0/sq mi (82.63/km^{2})
- Time zone: UTC-5 (EST)
  - Summer (DST): UTC-4 (EDT)
- ZIP code: 18661
- Area code(s): 570
- FIPS code: 42-21816
- Website: https://www.eastsideboroughpa.com/

East Side is a borough in Carbon County, Pennsylvania. It is part of Northeastern Pennsylvania. As of the 2020 census, East Side had a population of 247.

== Geography ==
East Side is located in northern Carbon County at 41°3′39″N 75°45′50″W (41.060844, -75.763973), on the east side of the Lehigh River. To the west, directly across the river, is the borough of White Haven in Luzerne County.

According to the U.S. Census Bureau, the borough has a total area of 1.15 square miles (2.99 km^{2}), of which 1.15 square miles (2.97 km^{2}) is land and 0.0077 square miles (0.02 km^{2}), or 0.54%, is water.

== Transportation ==
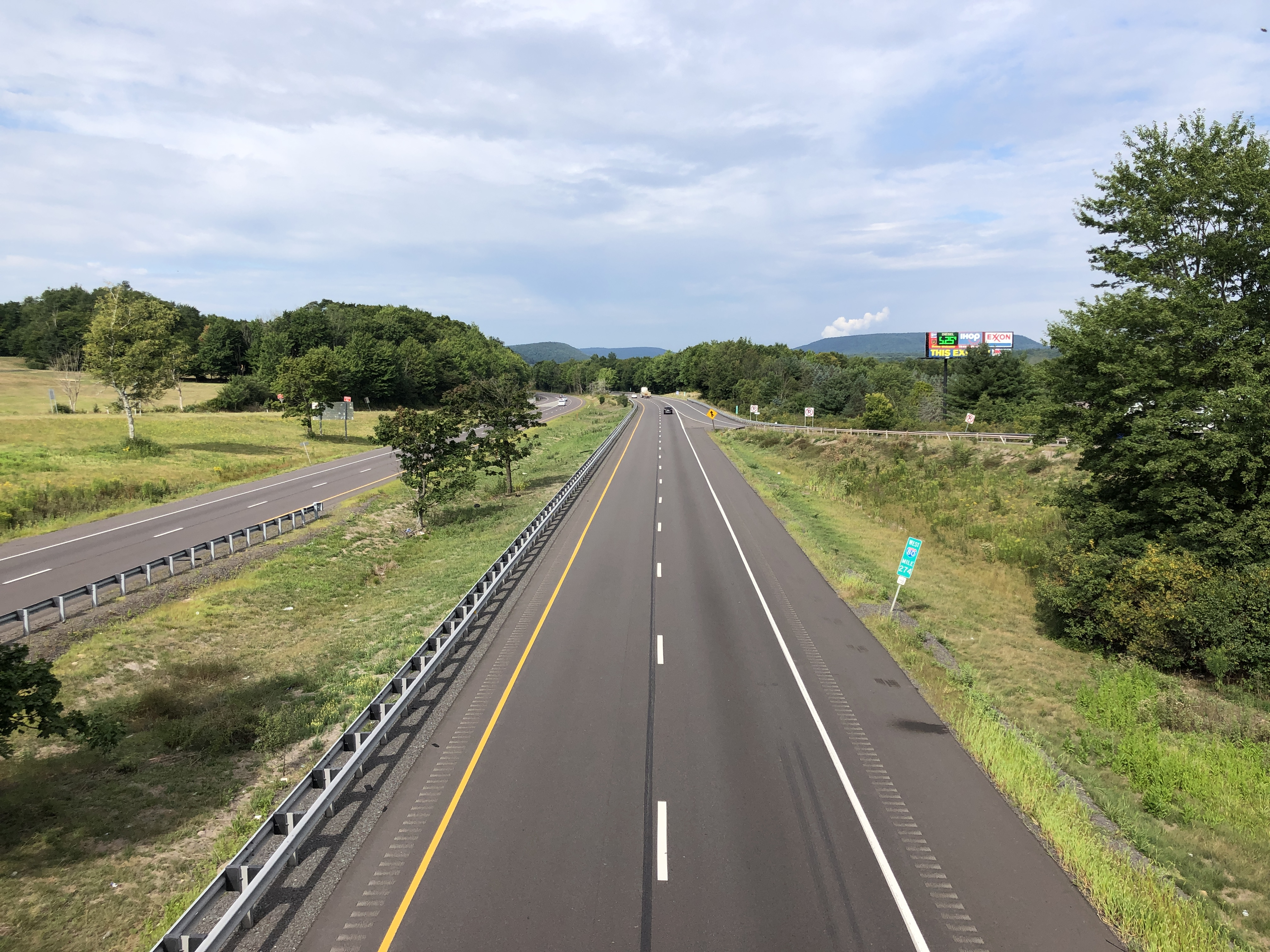
I-80 westbound in East Side

As of 2007, there were 5.18 miles (8.34 km) of public roads in East Side, of which 4.42 miles (7.11 km) were maintained by the Pennsylvania Department of Transportation (PennDOT) and 0.76 miles (1.22 km) were maintained by the borough.

Interstate 80 passes through the south side of the borough, with access from Exit 274 (Pennsylvania Route 534) at the borough's eastern border. Additional access is from Exit 273 in White Haven via Pennsylvania Route 940. I-80 leads east 3 miles (5 km) to an interchange with Interstate 476 and 33 miles (53 km) to Stroudsburg near the Delaware Water Gap, and west 14 miles (23 km) to Interstate 81 north of Hazleton.

== Demographics ==
Historical population
Census	Pop.	Note	%±
1900	210		—
1910	220		4.8%
1920	231		5.0%
1930	197		−14.7%
1940	274		39.1%
1950	286		4.4%
1960	228		−20.3%
1970	152		−33.3%
1980	302		98.7%
1990	330		9.3%
2000	290		−12.1%
2010	317		9.3%
2020	247		−22.1%

As of the census of 2000, there were 290 people, 129 households, and 77 families residing in the borough. The population density was 242.7 inhabitants per square mile (93.7/km^{2}). There were 146 housing units at an average density of 122.2 per square mile (47.2/km^{2}). The racial makeup of the borough was 97.93% White and 2.07% Native American. Hispanic or Latino of any race were 0.69% of the population.

There were 129 households, out of which 24.0% had children under the age of 18 living with them, 48.8% were married couples living together, 5.4% had a female householder with no husband present, and 40.3% were non-families. 34.1% of all households were made up of individuals, and 13.2% had someone living alone who was 65 years of age or older. The average household size was 2.25 and the average family size was 2.94.

In the borough the population was spread out, with 20.7% under the age of 18, 6.2% from 18 to 24, 27.2% from 25 to 44, 29.7% from 45 to 64, and 16.2% who were 65 years of age or older. The median age was 43 years. For every 100 females there were 92.1 males. For every 100 females age 18 and over, there were 93.3 males.

The median income for a household in the borough was $25,833, and the median income for a family was $35,833. Males had a median income of $30,481 versus $17,000 for females. The per capita income for the borough was $15,132. About 12.1% of families and 15.9% of the population were below the poverty line, including 23.4% of those under the age of 18 and 14.8% of those 65 or over.
