= Blakeslee, Pennsylvania =

Unincorporated community in Pennsylvania, US

- Unincorporated community
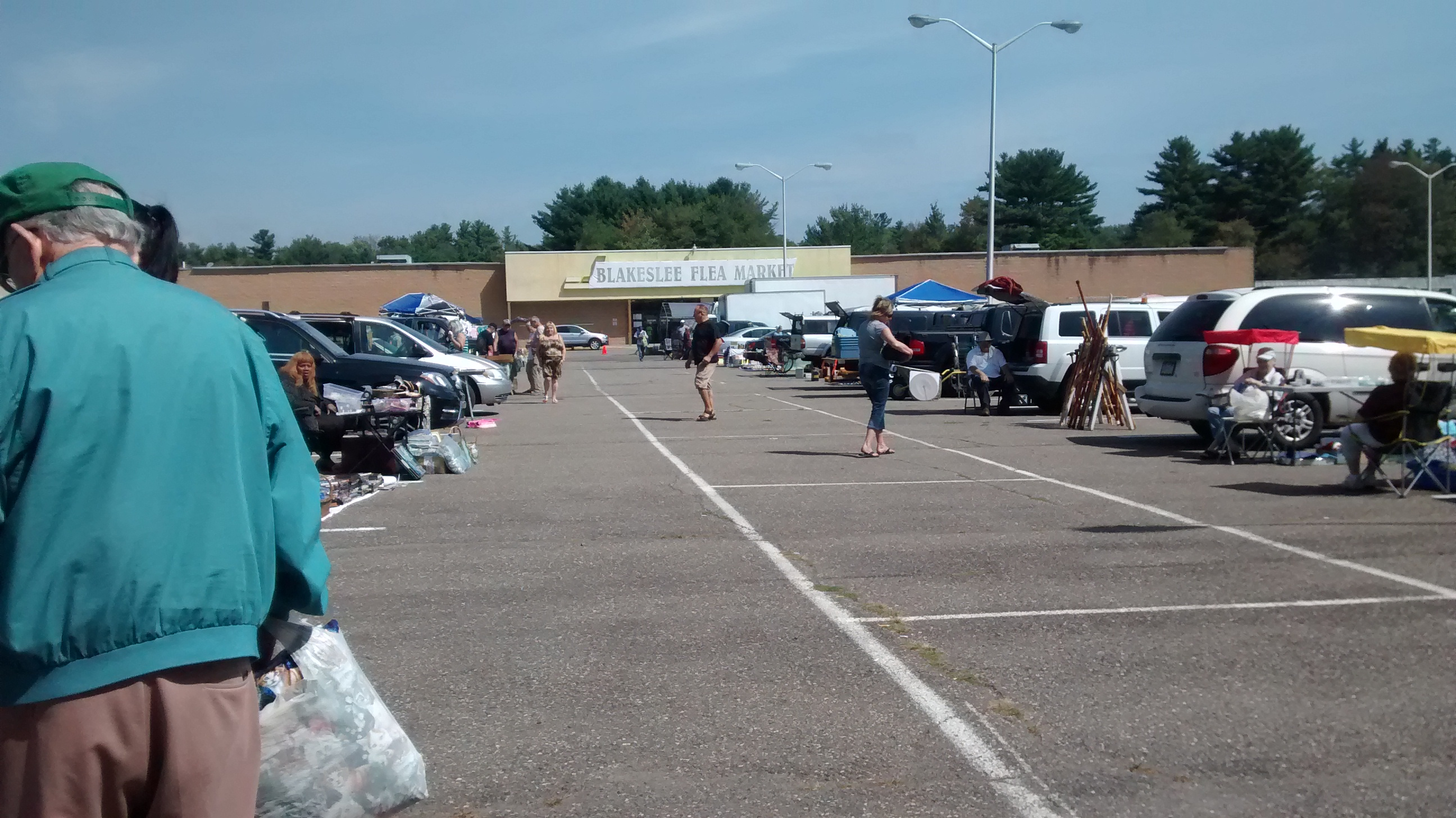
- The Blakeslee Flea Market

- Location within Pennsylvania Location within the United States
- Coordinates: 41°5′33″N 75°35′34″W
- Country: United States
- State: Pennsylvania
- County: Monroe
- Township: Tobyhanna
- Elevation: 1,676 ft (511 m)
- Time zone: UTC-5 (Eastern (EST))
  - Summer (DST): UTC-4 (EDT)
- ZIP code: 18610
- Area codes: 570 and 272
- GNIS feature ID: 1217340

Blakeslee is an unincorporated community in Tobyhanna Township in Monroe County, Pennsylvania, United States. Blakeslee is located at the intersection of PA 115 and PA 940.

A post office was established in Blakeslee in 1884 and named after Jacob Blakeslee, the first postmaster. The post office was located near Burger Road near his 300-acre homestead. Jacob Blakeslee would later serve as justice of the peace for the small community. The Blakeslee United Methodist Church was established in 1897. It was formerly home to the Blakeslee Inn & Restaurants, including the Blakeslee Diner, which was popular among tourists but burned down in 2016. The Blakeslee flea market is popular with the surrounding community.
