= Lake Naomi =

Resort community in the Pocono Mountains

Coordinates: 41.111°N 75.459°W

Lake Naomi is a 277-acre (1.12 km^{2}) lake with private beaches and marinas located in Pocono Pines, Pennsylvania in the Pocono Mountains of Northeastern Pennsylvania. The community of Lake Naomi Club is a resort community that includes 1,400 families who own property surrounding Lake Naomi.

== History ==
In September 1895, land owners around the Tunkhannock Creek, including brothers Frank and Rufus Miller, created the Pocono Spring Water Ice Company to build a 14-foot (4.3 m) dam across the creek, creating Lake Naomi. The land owners gave the company a 99-year lease for "the exclusive use of the water and its privileges."

In 1902, visitors came from many of the surrounding metropolitan areas, including New York City and Philadelphia. In the same year the first bathing beach was created and some lots on the north side of the lake were subdivided and sold to summer cottagers. A sailing camp for girls was set up on the northwest side of the lake. A Lutheran retreat, Lutherland, was erected on the southern side of the lake. The Millers and others utilized southern and eastern sides of the lake for swimming, sailing, skating, fishing. In 1921, a boathouse and beach were constructed on the site of today's Lake Naomi Clubhouse. In 1938, a famous Pennsylvania Supreme Court case took place over who owned the water rights to Lake Naomi, as the surrounding lands were soon owned by many different parties.

In 1963, the Logan Steele family purchased 2,600 acres (11 km2) surrounding the lake which eventually was turned into a resort community called the Lake Naomi Club. Logan Steel died in the 1980s and the club is now owned by its members and run by a board of governors.

== Lake Naomi Club ==
Lake Naomi Club is a recreational community in the Pocono Mountains of Northeastern Pennsylvania. It includes a 277-acre lake with non-motorized boating, fishing, swimming and sailing. Lake Naomi Club also offers an outdoor Olympic-sized pool, a second outdoor pool with an aquatic climbing wall, a nine-hole executive golf course, a tennis center and a clubhouse with restaurant and pub. The recreational staff offers activities for all ages. Additionally, there is a 56,000-square-foot community center with an indoor pool and a splash park, indoor tennis, a fitness center, a game room and a teen area.

== Climate ==
According to the Trewartha climate classification system, Lake Naomi has a Temperate Continental (Dc) Climate with warm summers (b), cold winters (o) and year-around precipitation. Dcbo climates are characterized by at least one month having an average mean temperature ≤ 32.0 °F (0 °C), four to seven months with an average mean temperature ≥ 50.0 °F (10 °C), all months with an average mean temperature < 72.0 °F (22 °C) and no significant precipitation difference between seasons. Although humidity levels are typically comfortable even during the summer months at Lake Naomi, episodes of heat and high humidity can occur with heat index values > 93 °F (34 °C). The annual peak in thunderstorm activity is July. During the winter months, the plant hardiness zone is 5b with an average annual extreme minimum air temperature of −14.1 °F (−26 °C). Episodes of extreme cold and wind can occur with wind chill values < −14 °F (−26 °C). Ice storms and large snowstorms depositing ≥ 12 inches (30 cm) of snow are somewhat frequent, particularly during nor’easters from December through March.

Climate data for Lake Naomi. Elevation 1831 ft (558 m). 1981-2010 Averages (1981-2018 Records)
Month	Jan	Feb	Mar	Apr	May	Jun	Jul	Aug	Sep	Oct	Nov	Dec	Year
Record high °F (°C)	61.2 (16.2)	72.0 (22.2)	81.2 (27.3)	87.0 (30.6)	89.4 (31.9)	89.3 (31.8)	93.7 (34.3)	91.9 (33.3)	89.3 (31.8)	82.0 (27.8)	74.4 (23.6)	65.9 (18.8)	93.7 (34.3)
Mean daily maximum °F (°C)	31.1 (−0.5)	34.8 (1.6)	43.1 (6.2)	55.6 (13.1)	66.6 (19.2)	74.5 (23.6)	78.6 (25.9)	77.1 (25.1)	70.0 (21.1)	58.3 (14.6)	47.5 (8.6)	35.5 (1.9)	56.2 (13.4)
Daily mean °F (°C)	22.7 (−5.2)	25.6 (−3.6)	33.1 (0.6)	44.7 (7.1)	55.0 (12.8)	63.4 (17.4)	67.9 (19.9)	66.4 (19.1)	59.3 (15.2)	47.9 (8.8)	38.6 (3.7)	27.7 (−2.4)	46.1 (7.8)
Mean daily minimum °F (°C)	14.2 (−9.9)	16.5 (−8.6)	23.1 (−4.9)	33.7 (0.9)	43.4 (6.3)	52.3 (11.3)	57.1 (13.9)	55.8 (13.2)	48.7 (9.3)	37.4 (3.0)	29.7 (−1.3)	19.9 (−6.7)	36.1 (2.3)
Record low °F (°C)	−22.8 (−30.4)	−14.0 (−25.6)	−7.5 (−21.9)	9.9 (−12.3)	26.7 (−2.9)	32.3 (0.2)	37.0 (2.8)	33.1 (0.6)	27.0 (−2.8)	16.2 (−8.8)	−1.8 (−18.8)	−14.9 (−26.1)	−22.8 (−30.4)
Average precipitation inches (mm)	3.86 (98)	3.31 (84)	4.23 (107)	4.62 (117)	4.65 (118)	5.05 (128)	4.78 (121)	4.30 (109)	5.14 (131)	5.20 (132)	4.57 (116)	4.45 (113)	54.16 (1,376)
Average snowfall inches (cm)	18.9 (48)	13.6 (35)	14.1 (36)	3.4 (8.6)	0.0 (0.0)	0.0 (0.0)	0.0 (0.0)	0.0 (0.0)	0.0 (0.0)	0.1 (0.25)	3.6 (9.1)	11.3 (29)	65.0 (165)
Average relative humidity (%)	74.5	68.9	64.4	60.6	62.4	72.2	71.9	75.2	76.2	72.3	71.3	75.3	70.4
Average dew point °F (°C)	15.8 (−9.0)	16.8 (−8.4)	22.4 (−5.3)	31.9 (−0.1)	42.4 (5.8)	54.3 (12.4)	58.5 (14.7)	58.3 (14.6)	51.8 (11.0)	39.4 (4.1)	30.1 (−1.1)	20.9 (−6.2)	37.0 (2.8)
Source: PRISM

== Ecology ==
According to the A. W. Kuchler U.S. potential natural vegetation types, Lake Naomi would have dominant vegetation types of Appalachian Oak (104) and Northern Hardwoods (106) with a dominant vegetation form of Northern Hardwood Forest (23).
