= Price Township, Pennsylvania =

Township in Pennsylvania, US

Price Township
- Township
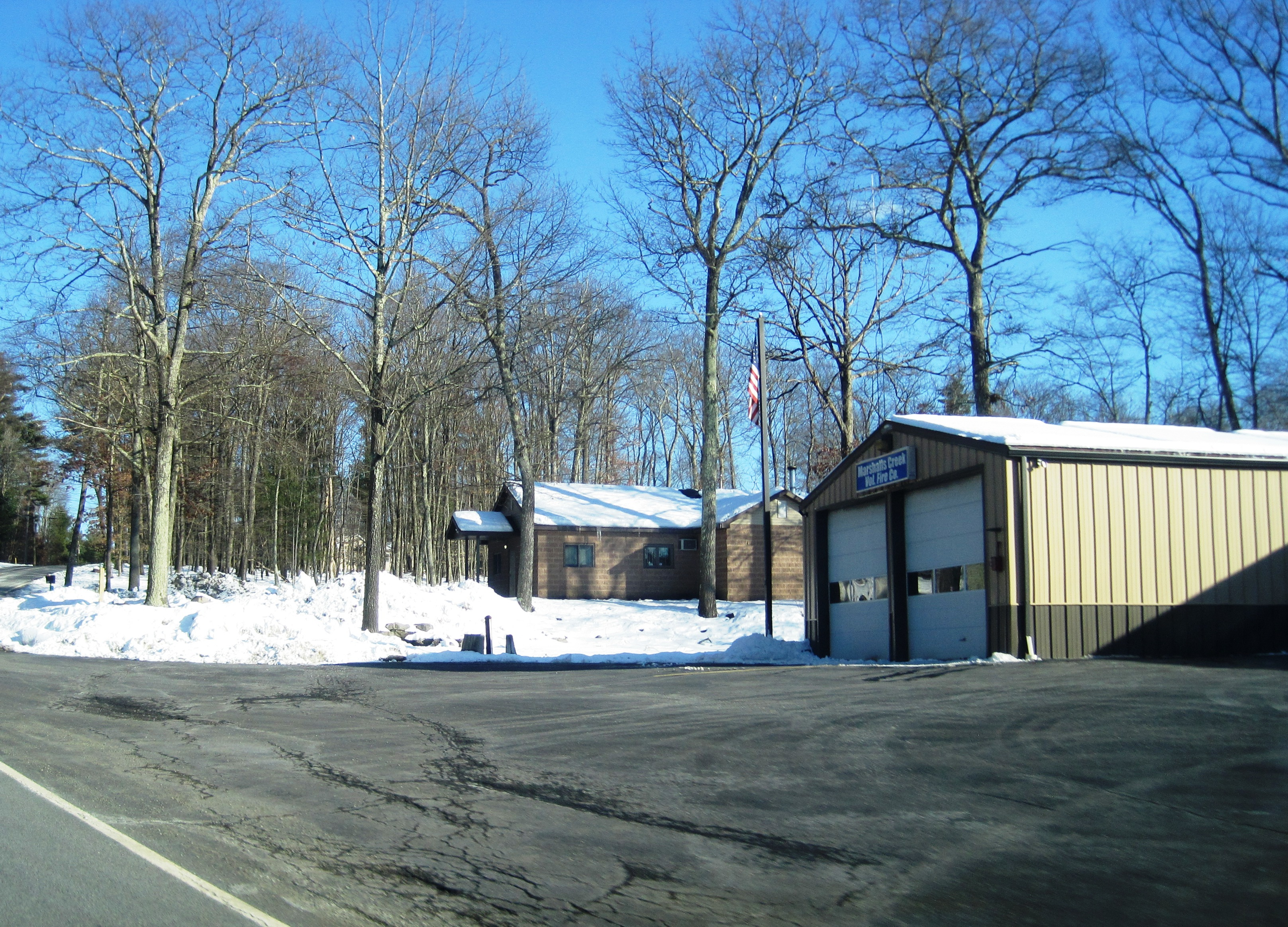
- Township municipal building and volunteer fire station

- Seal

- Location of Pennsylvania in the United States
- Coordinates: 41°10′00″N 75°09′59″W
- Country: United States
- State: Pennsylvania
- County: Monroe

Area
  - Total: 25.19 sq mi (65.23 km^{2})
  - Land: 25.02 sq mi (64.81 km^{2})
  - Water: 0.16 sq mi (0.42 km^{2})
- Elevation: 1,276 ft (389 m)

Population (2020)
  - Total: 3,675 ▲
  - Estimate (2021): 3,711
  - Density: 140.7/sq mi (54.34/km^{2})
- Time zone: UTC-5 (EST)
  - Summer (DST): UTC-4 (EDT)
- Area code: 570
- FIPS code: 42-089-62632
- Website: https://www.pricetownship.org/

Price Township is a township in Monroe County, Pennsylvania, United States. The population was 3,675 at the 2020 census.

== Geography ==
According to the United States Census Bureau, the township has a total area of 25.2 square miles (65.2 km^{2}), of which 25.0 square miles (64.8 km^{2}) is land and 0.2 square mile (0.4 km^{2}) (0.64%) is water.

== Demographics ==
Historical population
Census	Pop.	Note	%±
2000	2,649		—
2010	3,573		34.9%
2020	3,675		2.9%
2021 (est.)	3,711		1.0%
U.S. Decennial Census

As of the census of 2000, there were 2,649 people, 925 households, and 703 families residing in the township. The population density was 105.8 inhabitants per square mile (40.8/km^{2}). There were 1,270 housing units at an average density of 50.7 per square mile (19.6/km^{2}). The racial makeup of the township was 91.09% White, 5.21% African American, 0.15% Native American, 1.17% Asian, 1.02% from other races, and 1.36% from two or more races. Hispanic or Latino of any race were 3.89% of the population.

There were 925 households, out of which 41.9% had children under the age of 18 living with them, 65.3% were married couples living together, 6.6% had a female householder with no husband present, and 23.9% were non-families. 15.5% of all households were made up of individuals, and 5.0% had someone living alone who was 65 years of age or older. The average household size was 2.86 and the average family size was 3.23.

In the township the population was spread out, with 28.8% under the age of 18, 6.2% from 18 to 24, 34.2% from 25 to 44, 22.2% from 45 to 64, and 8.6% who were 65 years of age or older. The median age was 36 years. For every 100 females, there were 105.7 males. For every 100 females age 18 and over, there were 101.2 males.

The median income for a household in the township was $50,213, and the median income for a family was $52,500. Males had a median income of $38,648 versus $25,167 for females. The per capita income for the township was $19,244. About 3.1% of families and 5.3% of the population were below the poverty line, including 4.7% of those under age 18 and 8.1% of those age 65 or over.

United States presidential election results for Price Township, Pennsylvania
Year	Republican		Democratic		Third party(ies)	
Year	No.	%	No.	%	No.	%
2024	1,018	49.93%	1,000	49.04%	21	1.03%
2020	853	45.20%	1,017	53.90%	17	0.90%
2016	705	47.47%	727	48.96%	53	3.57%
2012	545	42.58%	716	55.94%	19	1.48%
2008	547	40.13%	804	58.99%	12	0.88%
2004	480	45.98%	551	52.78%	13	1.25%
2000	396	46.42%	431	50.53%	26	3.05%

== Schools ==
The public school system for Price Township falls under the jurisdiction of the East Stroudsburg Area School District.

== Climate ==
According to the Trewartha climate classification system, Price Township has a Temperate Continental climate (Dc) with warm summers (b), cold winters (o) and year-around precipitation (Dcbo). Dcbo climates are characterized by at least one month having an average mean temperature ≤ 32.0 °F (0 °C), four to seven months with an average mean temperature ≥ 50.0 °F (10 °C), all months with an average mean temperature < 72.0 °F (22 °C) and no significant precipitation difference between seasons. Although most summer days are slightly humid in Price Township, episodes of heat and high humidity can occur with heat index values > 97 °F (36 °C). Since 1981, the highest air temperature was 96.1 °F (36 °C) on July 22, 2011, and the highest daily average mean dew point was 71.0 °F (22 °C) on August 1, 2006. July is the peak month for thunderstorm activity, which correlates with the average warmest month of the year. The average wettest month is September, which correlates with tropical storm remnants during the peak of the Atlantic hurricane season. Since 1981, the wettest calendar day was 6.08 inches (154 mm) on September 30, 2010. During the winter months, the plant hardiness zone is 5b, with an average annual extreme minimum air temperature of −11.0 °F (−24 °C). Since 1981, the coldest air temperature was −21.7 °F (−30 °C) on January 21, 1994. Episodes of extreme cold and wind can occur with wind chill values < −23 °F (−31 °C). The average snowiest month is January, which correlates with the average coldest month of the year. Ice storms and large snowstorms depositing ≥ 12 inches (30 cm) of snow occur once every couple of years, particularly during nor’easters from December through March.

Climate data for Price Township, Elevation 994 ft (303 m), 1981-2010 normals, extremes 1981-2018
Month	Jan	Feb	Mar	Apr	May	Jun	Jul	Aug	Sep	Oct	Nov	Dec	Year
Record high °F (°C)	65.1 (18.4)	74.3 (23.5)	83.8 (28.8)	90.6 (32.6)	92.5 (33.6)	92.0 (33.3)	96.1 (35.6)	95.2 (35.1)	93.4 (34.1)	85.5 (29.7)	77.0 (25.0)	68.6 (20.3)	96.1 (35.6)
Mean daily maximum °F (°C)	33.7 (0.9)	37.2 (2.9)	45.8 (7.7)	58.9 (14.9)	69.6 (20.9)	77.4 (25.2)	81.0 (27.2)	80.0 (26.7)	72.9 (22.7)	61.5 (16.4)	49.9 (9.9)	38.1 (3.4)	58.9 (14.9)
Daily mean °F (°C)	24.4 (−4.2)	27.2 (−2.7)	35.2 (1.8)	46.9 (8.3)	57.1 (13.9)	65.7 (18.7)	69.7 (20.9)	68.6 (20.3)	61.3 (16.3)	49.8 (9.9)	40.1 (4.5)	29.5 (−1.4)	48.1 (8.9)
Mean daily minimum °F (°C)	15.0 (−9.4)	17.2 (−8.2)	24.5 (−4.2)	34.9 (1.6)	44.6 (7.0)	53.9 (12.2)	58.5 (14.7)	57.2 (14.0)	49.7 (9.8)	38.0 (3.3)	30.4 (−0.9)	20.9 (−6.2)	37.2 (2.9)
Record low °F (°C)	−21.7 (−29.8)	−12.6 (−24.8)	−4.6 (−20.3)	11.4 (−11.4)	26.9 (−2.8)	33.9 (1.1)	39.4 (4.1)	35.3 (1.8)	28.2 (−2.1)	17.2 (−8.2)	0.3 (−17.6)	−12.7 (−24.8)	−21.7 (−29.8)
Average precipitation inches (mm)	3.44 (87)	3.00 (76)	3.66 (93)	4.18 (106)	4.41 (112)	4.73 (120)	4.24 (108)	4.35 (110)	4.87 (124)	4.68 (119)	3.88 (99)	3.97 (101)	49.41 (1,255)
Average snowfall inches (cm)	14.5 (37)	10.4 (26)	10.8 (27)	2.6 (6.6)	0.0 (0.0)	0.0 (0.0)	0.0 (0.0)	0.0 (0.0)	0.0 (0.0)	0.1 (0.25)	2.7 (6.9)	8.7 (22)	49.9 (127)
Average relative humidity (%)	71.2	66.2	61.8	58.0	61.1	70.1	70.6	72.7	73.9	70.2	70.0	72.3	68.2
Average dew point °F (°C)	16.4 (−8.7)	17.4 (−8.1)	23.4 (−4.8)	32.9 (0.5)	43.8 (6.6)	55.7 (13.2)	59.7 (15.4)	59.5 (15.3)	52.9 (11.6)	40.5 (4.7)	31.1 (−0.5)	21.7 (−5.7)	38.0 (3.3)
Source: PRISM

== Transportation ==
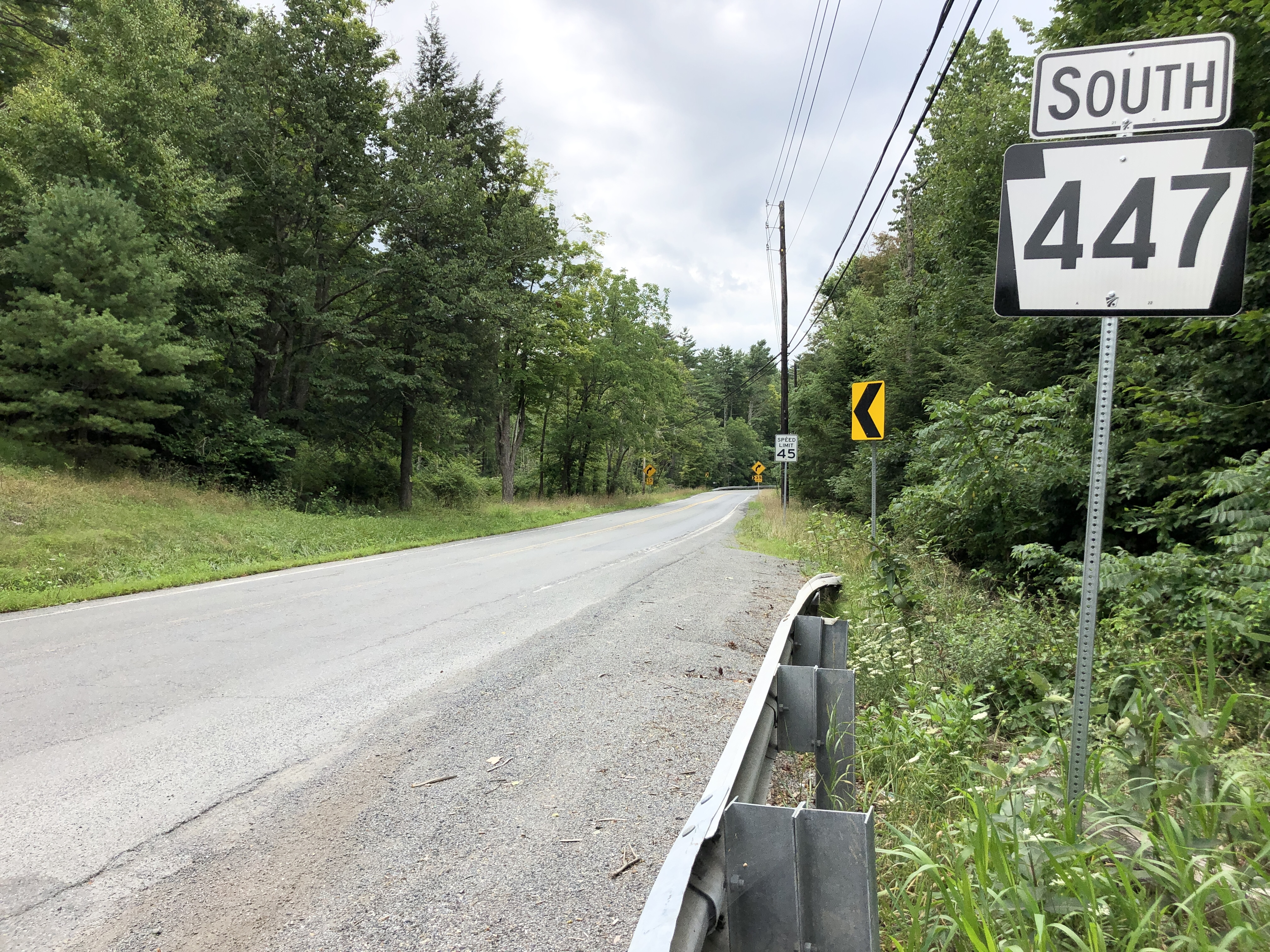
Southbound PA 447 running through Price Township

As of 2020, there were 30.32 miles (48.80 km) of public roads in Price Township, of which 15.17 miles (24.41 km) were maintained by the Pennsylvania Department of Transportation (PennDOT) and 15.15 miles (24.38 km) were maintained by the township.

Pennsylvania Route 447 is the only numbered highway in Price Township. It follows a north-south alignment across southern and western portions of the township.

== Ecology ==
According to the A. W. Kuchler U.S. potential natural vegetation types, Price Township would have a dominant vegetation type of Appalachian Oak (104) with a dominant vegetation form of Eastern Hardwood Forest (25). The peak spring bloom typically occurs in late-April and peak fall color usually occurs in mid-October. The plant hardiness zone is 5b with an average annual extreme minimum air temperature of −11.0 °F (−24 °C).
