= Pocono Lake, Pennsylvania =

Unincorporated community in Pennsylvania, US

- Unincorporated community
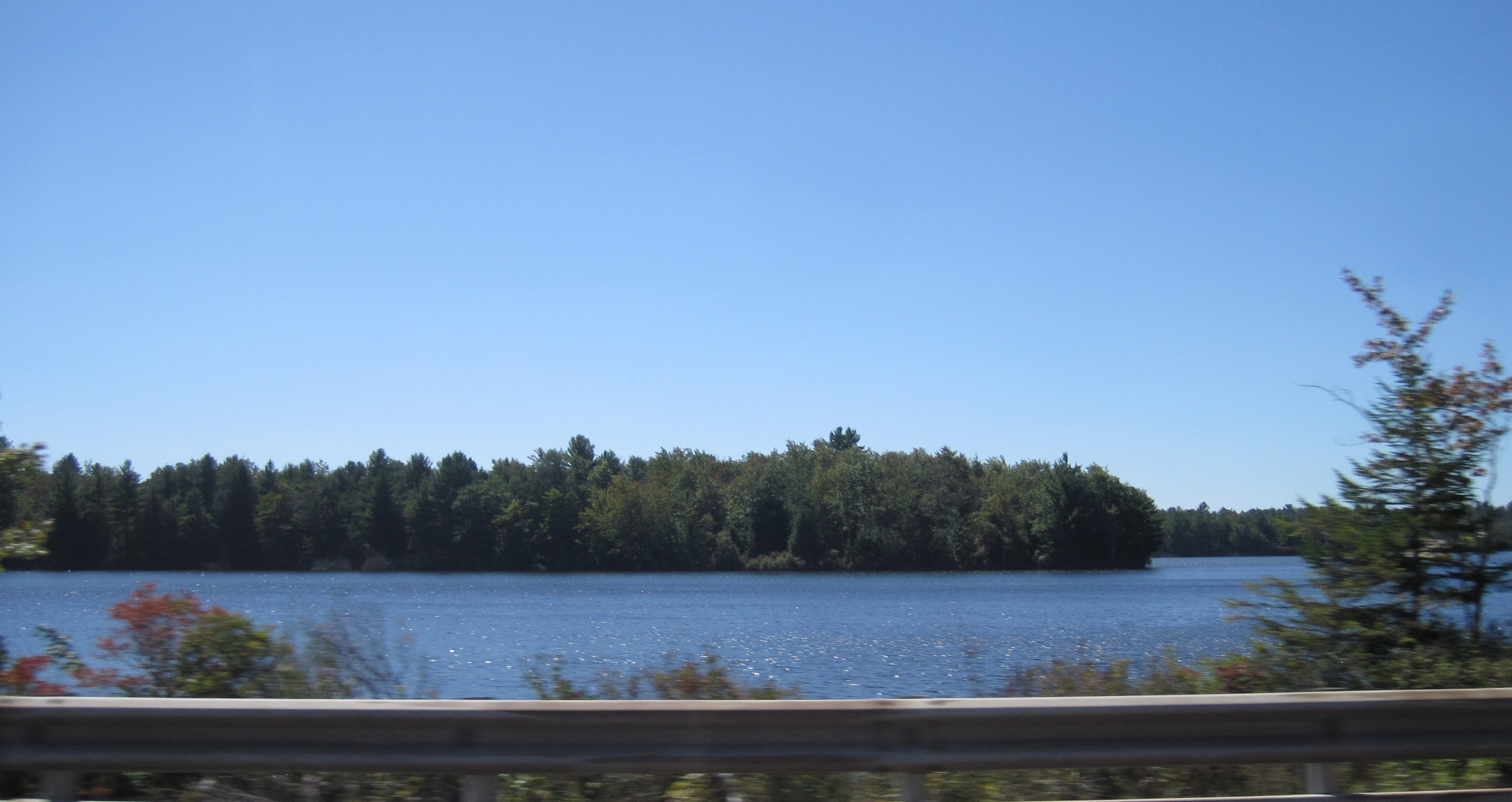
- Pocono Lake seen from PA 940

- Location within Pennsylvania Location within the United States
- Coordinates: 41°07′19″N 75°32′21″W
- Country: United States
- State: Pennsylvania
- County: Monroe
- Township: Tobyhanna
- Elevation: 1,749 ft (533 m)
- Time zone: UTC-5 (Eastern (EST))
  - Summer (DST): UTC-4 (EDT)
- ZIP code: 18347
- Area codes: 570 and 272

Pocono Lake is an unincorporated community in Tobyhanna Township, Monroe County, Pennsylvania, United States. It is located a few miles west of Pocono Pines by Pennsylvania Route 940.

Pocono is a Native American name purported to mean "a stream between two mountains".

The school district is considered below the state average.

In 2014, economic decline caused an increase in the use of SNAP (Supplemental Nutrition Assistance Program) food stamps throughout the region. According to Rev. Luke Richards, pastor of the Pocono Lake Wesleyan Church, "huge needs" are "ever-changing" in the area.

== Notable person ==
William Henry Christman, a laborer from Pocono Lake and an enlisted man in the United States Army during the American Civil War, was the first soldier to be buried at Arlington National Cemetery, in 1864.
