= Pocono Pines, Pennsylvania =

Unincorporated community in Pennsylvania, US

- Census-designated place
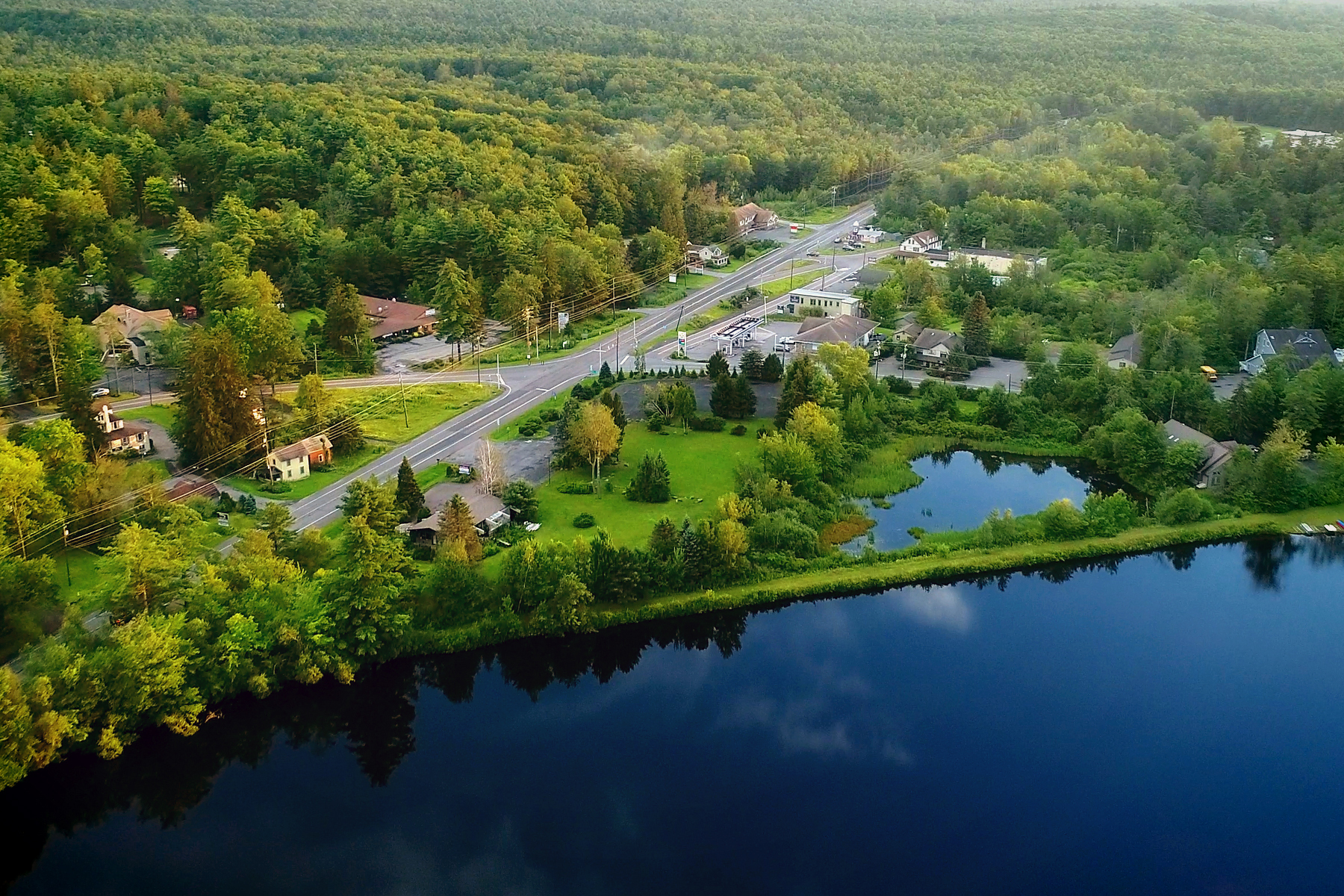
- Aerial view of Pocono Pines at the intersection of PA 940 and PA 423
- Interactive map of Pocono Pines, Pennsylvania
- Coordinates: 41°06′54″N 75°27′37″W
- Country: United States
- State: Pennsylvania
- County: Monroe
- Township: Tobyhanna

Area
  - Total: 5.68 sq mi (14.71 km^{2})
  - Land: 5.19 sq mi (13.43 km^{2})
  - Water: 0.50 sq mi (1.29 km^{2})
- Elevation: 1,804 ft (550 m)

Population (2020)
  - Total: 2,007
  - Density: 387.1/sq mi (149.45/km^{2})
- Time zone: UTC-5 (EST)
  - Summer (DST): UTC-4 (EDT)
- ZIP code: 18350
- Area codes: 570 and 272
- FIPS code: 42-61768

Pocono Pines is a census-designated place (CDP) in Tobyhanna Township, Monroe County, Pennsylvania. The population in the 2020 United States census was 2,007, an increase over the 1,409 population at the 2010 census.

== Geography ==
Pocono Pines is located at 41°6′54″N 75°27′37″W (41.114976, -75.460408). According to the United States Census Bureau, the CDP has a total area of 4.4 square miles (11 km^{2}), of which 4.0 square miles (10 km^{2}) is land and 0.4 square miles (1.0 km^{2}) (9.95%) is water.

== History ==
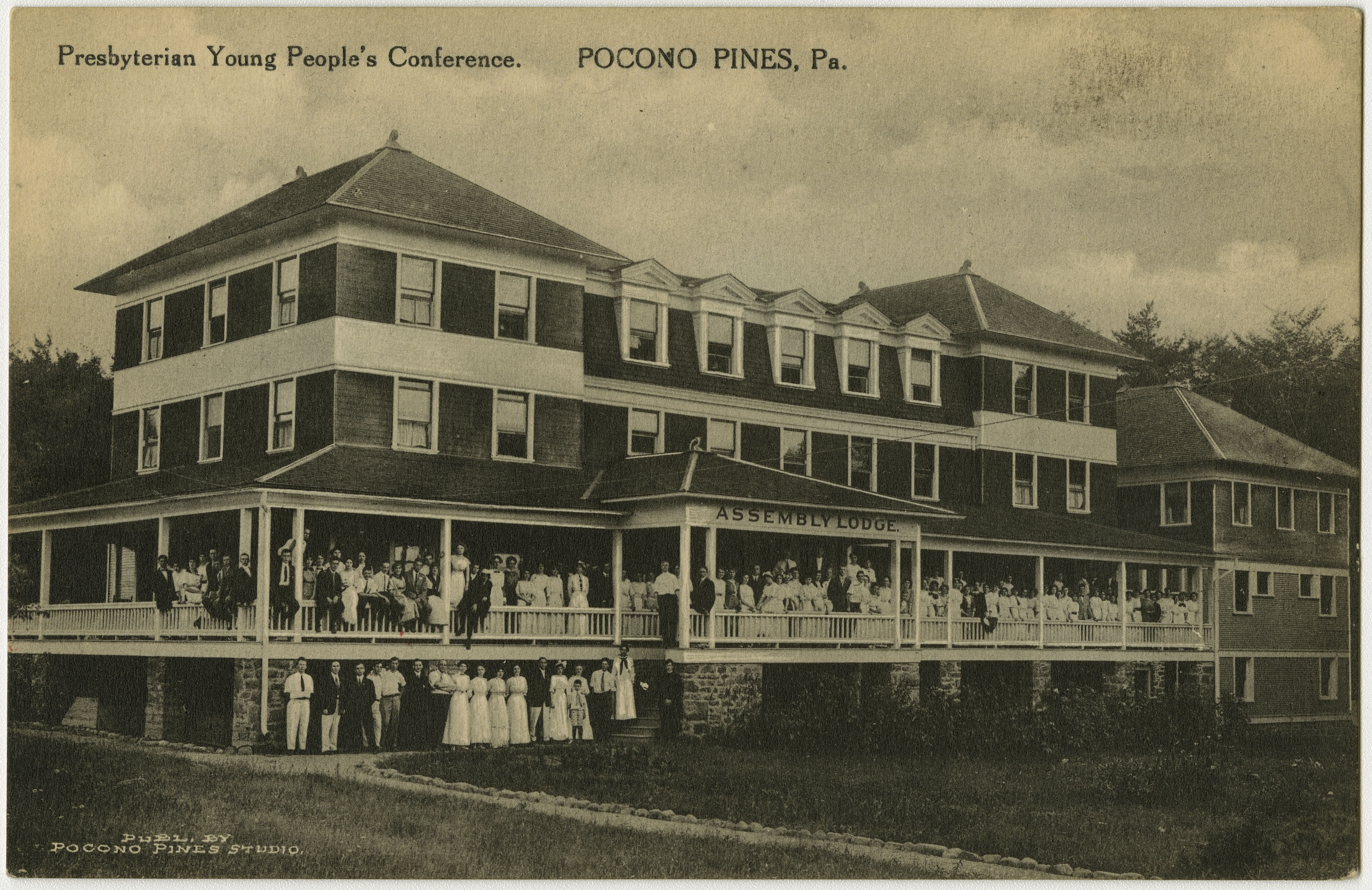
An early postcard of the Presbyterian Young People's Conference held at Assembly Lodge in Pocono Pines

Pocono Pines is located in the heart of the Pocono Mountains and is home to the communities of Lake Naomi and Pinecrest Lake. Most of the land was originally owned by the Miller family. Frank C. Miller, his brother Rufus W. Miller, and others, bought lands on Tunkhannock Creek in Tobyhanna Township, Monroe County, Pennsylvania, organized a corporation known as the Pocono Spring Water Ice Company sometime in the 1890s. In September 1895, a 14-foot (4.3 m) dam was constructed across the creek and water began backing-up forming "Lake Naomi", a lake more than a mile long and about one-third of a mile wide. The Pocono Spring Water Ice Company was granted a 99-year lease for "the exclusive use of the water and its privileges." It was chartered for the purpose of "erecting a dam, for pleasure, boating, skating, fishing and the cutting, storing and selling of ice."

In 1902, visitors came from many of the surrounding metropolitan areas including New York City and Philadelphia. In the same year, the first bathing beach was created and some lots on the north side of the lake were subdivided and sold to summer cottagers. A sailing camp for girls was set up on the northwest side of the lake. A Lutheran retreat, Lutherland, was erected on the southern side of the lake. The Millers and others utilized the southern and eastern sides of the lake for swimming, sailing, skating, fishing. In 1921, a boathouse and beach were constructed on the site of today's Lake Naomi Clubhouse. In 1938, a famous Pennsylvania Supreme Court case took place over who owned the water rights to Lake Naomi, as the surrounding lands were soon owned by many different parties. See Miller v. Lutheran Conference & Camp Ass'n, 331 Pa. 241 (Pa. 1938).

In 1963, the Logan Steele family purchased 2,600 acres (11 km^{2}) surrounding the lake which eventually was turned into a resort community called the Lake Naomi Club. Logan Steele died in the 1980s, and the club is now owned by its members and run by a board of governors. Lake Naomi Club today includes 1,400 families who own property surrounding Lake Naomi. Lake Naomi itself is a 277-acre (1.12 km^{2}) lake with private beaches and marinas. The club has a very active sailing organization, three pools, including a 50-meter outdoor Olympic-sized pool with a scenic view of the lake, 18 tennis courts, and full service clubhouse.

There is another community center that lies directly across from Timber Trails (a branch off Lake Naomi) that was completed and opened Memorial Day weekend of 2007 for all community members to enjoy.

Eventually, Naomi Pines was renamed Pocono Pines. Route 940 is the main thoroughfare through the village of Pocono Pines. Various businesses are located at the intersection of Route 940 and Route 423.

== Demographics ==
Historical population
Census	Pop.	Note	%±
2000	1,013		—
2010	1,409		39.1%
2020	2,007		42.4%

At the 2020 census, there were 2,007 people residing in the census-designated place. The racial makeup was 82.8% White, 4.0% African American, 2.3% Asian, 0.5% American Indian and Alaska Native, 3.7% from other races, and 6.6% from two or more races. Hispanic or Latino of any race were 9.7% of the population.

There were 477 households, of which 13.8% had children under the age of 18 living with them. 41.5% were married couples living together, 28.7% had a male householder with no spouse present, and 28.1% had a female householder with no spouse present. The average family size was 2.6. 19.5% of the population were under the age of 18, 86.1% were 18 years and above, and 39.3% were 65 and above.

The median household income was $92,626, and the median family income was $95,469. 3.1% of individuals were below the poverty line.

== Education ==
The CDP is in the Pocono Mountain School District.
