= Woodloch =

Woodloch may refer to:

- Woodloch, Texas, a town in Montgomery County, Texas
- Woodloch Pines, a resort located in the Poconos in Pennsylvania
