= Samuel Rubel =

- Samuel Rubel
- Born: 1881; Latvia
- Died: April 29, 1949 (aged 67–68); USA
- Occupations: Coal Miner & Ice Retailer

Samuel Rubel (1881-1949) was an American millionaire immigrant from Russia.

== Life and career ==
In the 1920 U. S. Census his occupation was described as "Coal Miner & Ice Retailer." Rubel emigrated to America in 1904 from Riga, Latvia, at the age of 23. Rubel started his career selling coal and ice with a horse-drawn wagon in the tenements in the East New York section of Brooklyn.

Rubel became the head of the Pocono Mountain Ice Company based in Hoboken, New Jersey, which became the leading ice company in the Pennsylvania and New Jersey area, buying up many of the smaller ice companies. Beginning in the 1930s with the advent of refrigeration, the harvesting of the ice from lakes became less and less profitable. Eventually, the ice companies folded, and Rubel switched his focus to other fields (such as brewing).

In 1946, Rubel's mansion in Roslyn, New York was destroyed by fire.

Rubel died on April 29, 1949. He was president of the Ebling Brewing Company at the time of his death and his net worth was estimated at $8,000,000.

Rubel was a supporter of the Boy Scouts of America. Samuel Rubel donated a large tract of land around Stillwater Lake in Pocono Summit, PA to the Bethlehem Area Council; the land was presented to the Scouts on May 27, 1949. The land, which is now known as Camp Minsi, is still in use by the Boy Scouts today.

=== Personal life ===
Samuel Rubel married Dora Nachumowitz; the couple had two daughters.

== Death ==
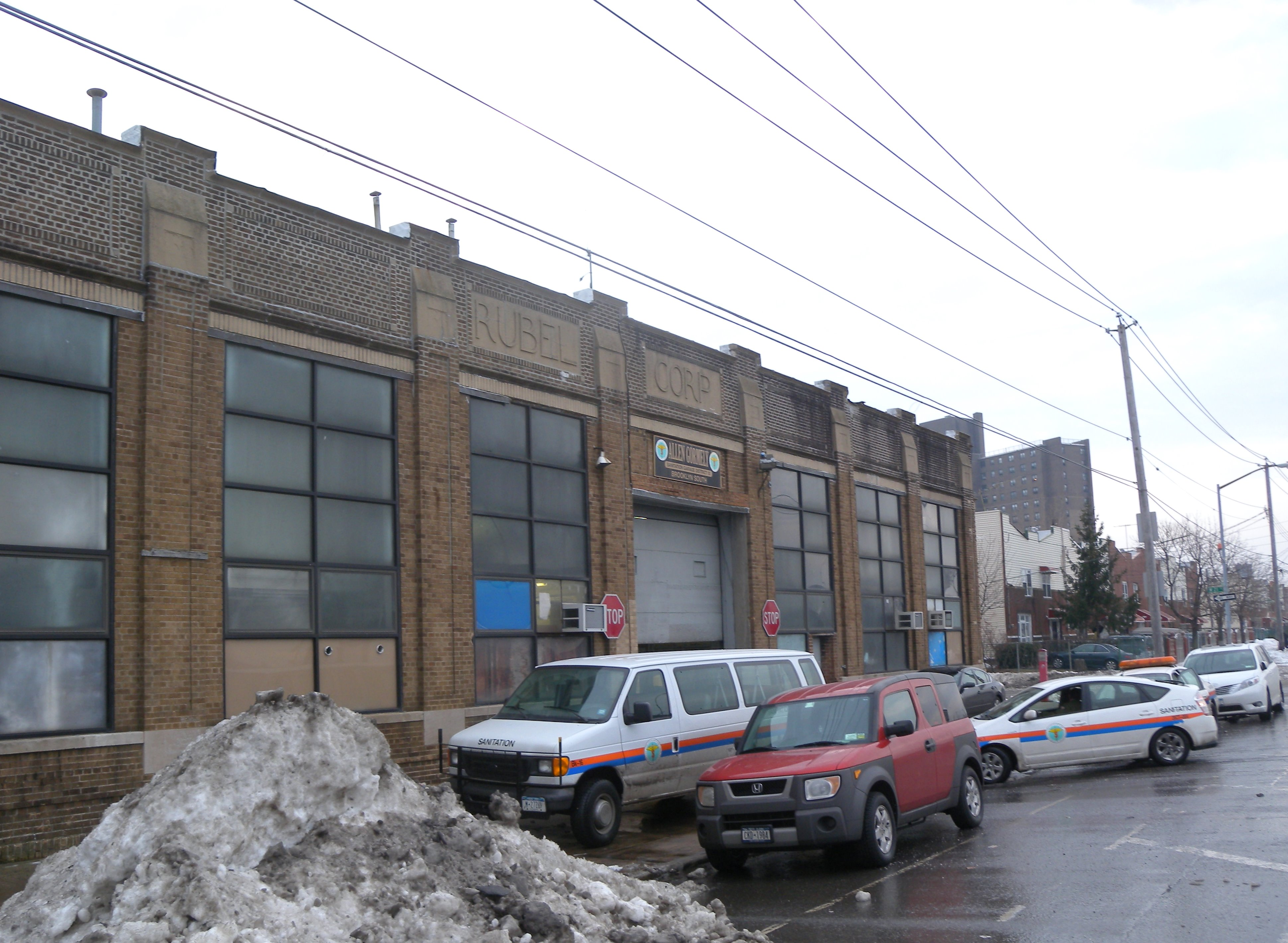
Former Rubel Corp building in Coney Island

Obituary from the New York Times (April 30, 1949):

The career of Samuel Rubel verged on the fabulous... His first route was the north side of Watkins Street, in the East New York section. He covered it with a horse and wagon... Up the tenement stoops Mr. Rubel personally carried his cakes of ice and bags of coal. His next move was to a coal platform, with an office on Pitkin Avenue. 'That year I started selling to other peddlers,' he said later... In 1925 he bought the majority stock of the Ice Service Corporation and also two other firms... Two years later his firm was merged with the Commonwealth Fuel Company and the Putnam Coal and Ice Company. The new concern, the Rubel Corporation, of which he became head, then had thirty-five coal pickets, forty ice factories and fifty coal and ice stations in the greater city. The same year Mr. Rubel bought the Ebling Brewery then in trouble with prohibition authorities for the manufacture and sale of beer. He planned to convert it into an ice-cream factory.
