= Stillwater Lake =

Stillwater Lake may refer to:

- Stillwater Lake, Nova Scotia, a residential community of the Halifax Regional Municipality, Canada
- Stillwater Lake (Pennsylvania), a reservoir in Pocono Summit, Monroe County, U.S.

== See also ==
- Upper Stillwater Lake and Lower Stillwater Lake, part of Stillwater River (Flathead County, Montana), U.S.
