= Minsi Trails Council =

Council of the Boy Scouts of America

Minsi Trails Council #502
- Owner: Boy Scouts of America
- Headquarters: Allentown, Pennsylvania, U.S.
- Founded: 1969
- President: Colleen Mooney-McGee
- Commissioner: Alan Edelman
- Scout Executive: Kevin McClelland
- Website www.minsitrails.org

Minsi Trails Council is a council of the Boy Scouts of America that serves Scouts in the Lehigh Valley and the Pocono Mountains regions of eastern Pennsylvania and western New Jersey. In Pennsylvania, the council serves five counties: Lehigh, Northampton, Monroe, Carbon, and Luzerne. In New Jersey, it serves Warren County.

Minsi Trails Council serves 3,700 youth. This number is down from 10,000 as recently as 2019.

The council was formed in 1969, after the merger of the Bethlehem Area Council, Delaware Valley Area Council, and Lehigh Council. The council consists of six districts and maintains two camping properties: Camp Minsi in Pocono Summit, Pennsylvania, and Trexler Scout Reservation in Jonas, Pennsylvania. Combined, these camps serve more than 4,000 campers annually.

== Finances ==
Minsi Trails Council #502 Boy Scouts of America has EIN 23-1708585 as a 501(c)(3) Public Charity; in 2024, it claimed $3,753,999 in total revenue and $5,702,103 in total assets.

The Minsi Trails Council Boy Scouts of America Trust has 38-6952428 as a 501(c)(3) Public Charity; in 2024, it claimed total revenue of $320,019 and total assets of $8,992,966.

The Trust for the Benefit of Minsi Trails Council has EIN 22-1949075 as a 501(c)(3) Public Charity; in 2024, it claimed $419,231 in total revenue and $6,525,887 in total assets.

== Organization ==
The Minsi Trails Council maintains a central headquarters and service center in Allentown, Pennsylvania. The service center includes offices, conference rooms, and a council Scout shop. A copy of the R. Tait McKenzie sculpture The Ideal Scout stands outside the center.

The council is divided into five districts divided by county and school district boundaries based on geographic location and size.

- Carbon/Luzurne District — Serving Luzerne County, Pennsylvania and Carbon County, Pennsylvania(including Jim Thorpe Area School District, Lehighton Area School District, Palmerton Area School District, White Haven, Weatherly, Freeland, Beaver Meadows, Hazleton, McAdoo, West Hazleton, Conyngham, Drums, and Sugarloaf.)
- Northampton District — Serving Northampton County, Pennsylvania (Bangor Area School District, Easton Area School District, Nazareth Area School District, Northampton Area School District, Pen Argyl Area School District, Bethlehem Area School District, Saucon Valley School District and Wilson School District)
- Lehigh District — Serving portions of Lehigh County, Pennsylvania (including Allentown School District, Salisbury Township School District, East Penn School District), Parkland School District, Whitehall-Coplay School District, Northwestern Lehigh School District, Catasauqua Area School District, and Northern Lehigh School District)
- Monroe District — Serving Monroe County, Pennsylvania (including Stroudsburg Area School District, East Stroudsburg Area School District, Pleasant Valley School District, and Pocono Mountain School District)
- Warren District — Serving Warren County, New Jersey (including Phillipsburg School District, Belvidere School District, and Hackettstown School District)

== Camps ==
=== Camp Minsi ===
Minsi Trails Council owns and operates Camp Minsi, a Scouts BSA camp, over 1,200 acres (5 km2) in Pocono Summit, Pennsylvania.

Camp Minsi
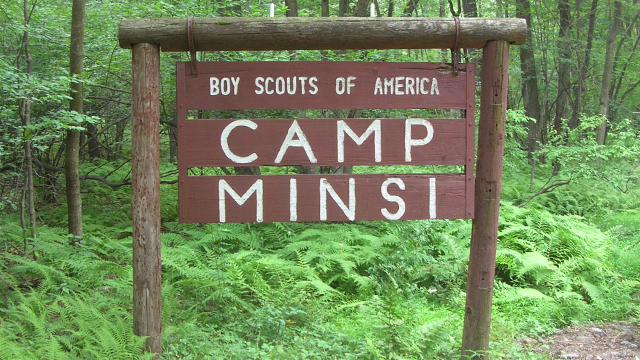
- Location: Pocono Summit, Pennsylvania
- Country: United States
- Coordinates: 41.1219°N 75.4239°W
- Founded: 1949
- Camp Director: James "Foof" Feuerstein
- Program Director: Kasey Pohl (Cub Program) & Matt Gillespie (Scouts BSA Program)
- Ranger: John Buz
- Website www.campminsi.org

Camp Minsi is on the shores of the 314-acre (1 km^{2}) Stillwater Lake in Pocono Summit, Pennsylvania. The camp was donated to the Boy Scouts in 1949 by Samuel Rubel of the Pocono Mountain Ice Company. The camp was formerly owned by Bethlehem Area Council prior to the establishment of Minsi Trails Council in 1969.

Camp Minsi encompasses 1,200 acres (5 km^{2}) of relatively flat Pocono woodlands, and holds over 20 miles (32 km) of hiking trails and varied wildlife.

A central feature of the camp is Stillwater Lake. The lake provides opportunities for swimming, small-boat sailing, canoeing, rowing, kayaking, fishing, standup paddleboarding, boardsailing, blobbing and other aquatic activities. Camp Minsi's first-year camper program is known as the Trail to Adventure (TTA). The camp's ScoutCraft area teaches outdoor skills - while the unique Minsi Village and Voyageur Outpost areas provide hands-on living history with focuses on primitive outdoor skills, blacksmithing, woodsmithing, lumberjacking, Native American culture, archaeology, pioneering, branding, games, crafts, and cooking. The camp's Handicraft area allows Scouts to experience the crafts of woodcarving, leather crafting, basketry, pottery, art, textiles and model building. The camp's Ecology-Conservation area offers environmental programs and nature studies. The Shooting Sports area allows Scouts to shoot rifles, shotguns, and bows and arrows. Other program areas include programs focused on citizenship and communications, health and safety, trade skills, sports and athletics, and adult leadership training.

In addition to its traditional Scouts BSA program areas, Camp Minsi offers high adventure programs for Venturers and older Scouts. High adventure offerings include whitewater rafting, mountain biking, horseback riding, treetop adventures and zip-lining, and other activities both on, and off, site.

Camp Minsi has over 20 buildings, 11 established troop sites, 10 primitive outpost sites, four freshwater springs, miles of trails and several historical and natural points of interest.

The camp has been named "Best Campground", "Best Non-Profit", "Best Fishing Trip", "Best River Rafting / River Trip", and "Best Kayaks" in the Poconos by the readers of the Pocono Record in the newspaper's 2013, 2014, 2015, and 2017 "Reader's Choice" contests. The camp was featured in Scouting and Men's Health magazines in 2015.

==== Summer camp program areas ====
- Aquatics / Waterfront
- Citizenship & Communications (Cit-Com)
- Dining Hall
- Ecology-Conservation (E-con)
- Frontier Town
- Handicraft
- Health & Wellness
- High Adventure / Afternoon Adventures
- ScoutCraft
- Shooting Sports (Archery, Rifle, and Shotgun)
- Sports & Recreation
- Trading Post
- Trail to Adventure (first-year camper program)
- Voyageur Outpost

==== Campsites ====
- Site 1: Mohican
- Site 2: Tuscarora
- Site 3: Iroquois
- Site 4: Mohawk
- Site 5: Onondoga
- Site 6: Oneida
- Site 7: Cayuga
- Site 8: Seneca
- Site 9: Lenape
- Site 10: Shawnee
- Site 11: Sacagawea
- Site 12: Tatamy

==== Specialty camps ====
- Pocono Summit Adventure Camp — Established in 2018, the Pocono Summit Adventure Camp is a high adventures specialty camp geared towards Venturing crews and older Scouts. Based out of Camp Minsi, the program includes whitewater rafting on the Lehigh River, mountain biking the Lehigh Gorge, treetop adventure climbing and zip-lines, horseback riding, and other special activities highlighting the unique features of the Pocono mountains.
- Minsi Trails STEM Camp — Established in 2017 under the name SkillsFest, this program is a specialty week focused on STEM education. During the week participants work with field experts and professionals to earn skill-specific merit badges and other Scouts BSA awards.
- The National Muslim Scout Jamboree — Established in 2016, Camp Minsi hosts this biennial event in collaboration with the National Islamic Committee on Scouting (NICS) and the Boy Scouts of America (BSA). Focusing on the Messengers of Peace initiative, the jamboree welcomes members of the Islamic Scouting community from across the country and around the globe. The 2016 Jamboree was attended by Charles W. Dahlquist II, the National Commissioner .
- Pocono Summit Day Camp — The camp hosts an annual week-long Cub Scout day camp each August. The camp has been named "Best Day Camp" in the Poconos by the readers of the Pocono Record in the newspaper's 2013, 2014, 2015, and 2017 "Reader's Choice" contests.
- Winter IceFest — Established in 2017, the Winter IceFest on Stillwater Lake is an annual winter festival for Scouts hosted at Camp Minsi. Activities include ice fishing and ice cutting demonstrations, plus snow and ice games and Scouting demonstrations and displays.

==== Gallery ====
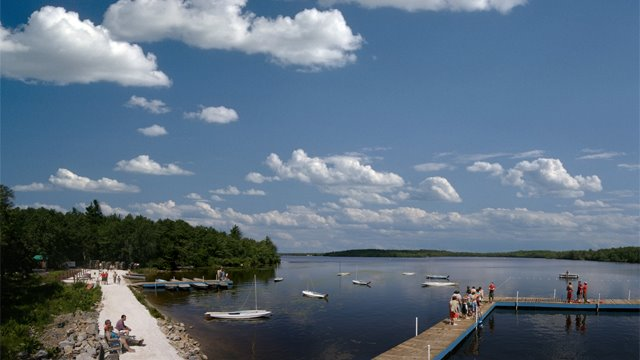
Waterfront on Stillwater Lake

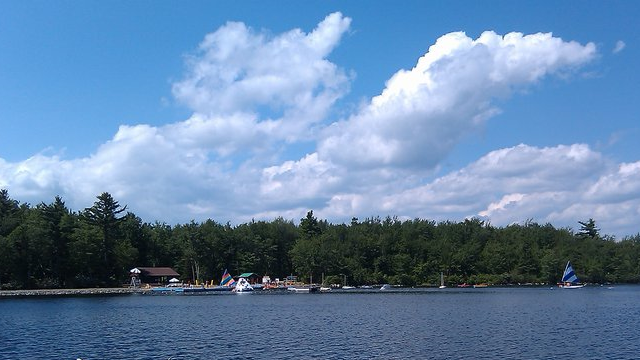
Waterfront on Stillwater Lake

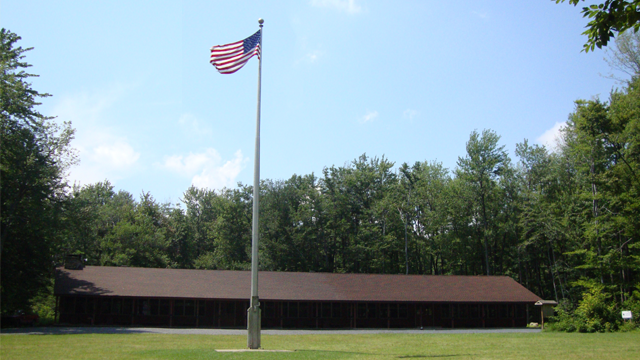
The Dining Hall

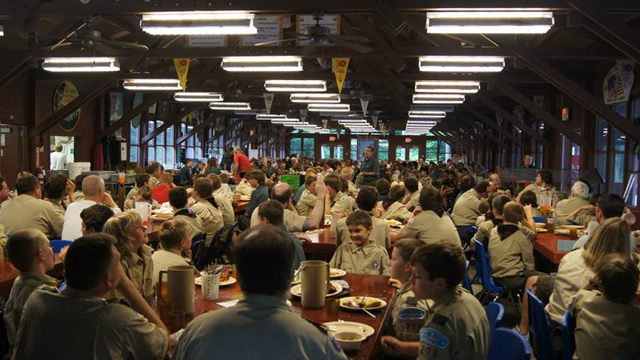
Inside the Dining Hall

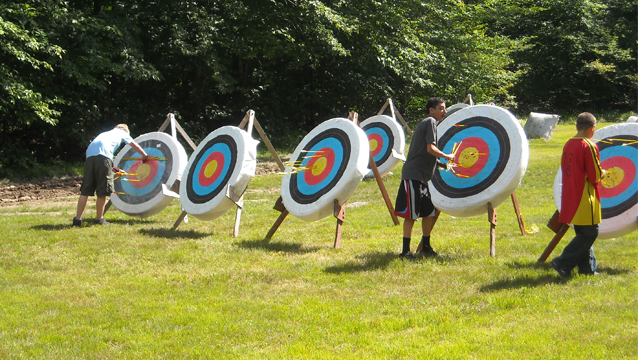
Archery range

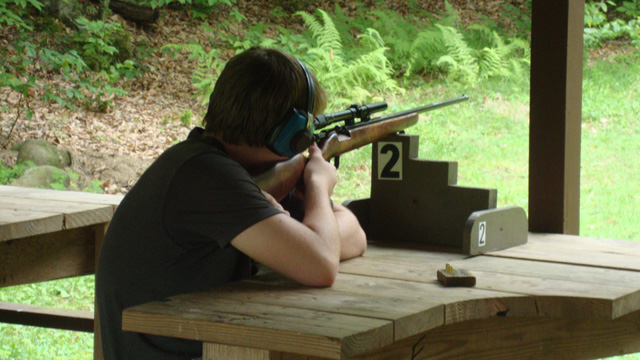
Rifle range

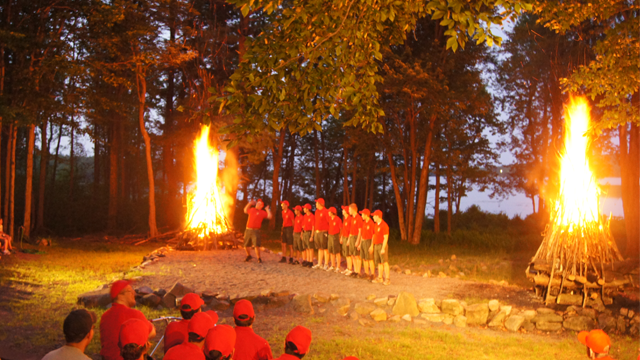
Staff performing a skit at a campfire

=== Former camps ===
Until 2023, Minsi Trails Council owned and maintained the Trexler Scout Reservation, which opened in the late 1920s. Akelaland (Cub Scout) camp and Settlers Camp (Scouts BSA camp) shared this 900+acre (3.6 km2) Scout Reservation in Jonas, Pennsylvania.

In 2022, the council announced it would sell the property in order to raise needed funds. On May 25, 2023 it was announced that the Trexler Veterans Initiative would be purchasing the property.

==== Trexler Scout Reservation ====
Trexler Scout Reservation
- Location: Jonas, Pennsylvania
- Country: United States
- Coordinates: 40.9581°N 75.4916°W
- Founded: 1927
- Founder: Harry Clay Trexler
- Akelaland Camp Director: Cheryl Feuerstein
- Akelaland Program Director: Kasey Pohl
- Settlers Camp Director: Greg Piopi
- Settlers Camp Program Director: Matt Gillespie
- Settlers Asst Camp Directors: Jason Capone & Mike Williams
- Website www.akelaland.org www.settlerscamptsr.org

The former Trexler Scout Reservation was located on 900 acres of land in Jonas, Pennsylvania. This tract of land was parceled together and donated by noted WW1 General and Lehigh Valley philanthropist Harry C. Trexler with Scouts first enjoying the property in 1926, and in 1928 the camp held its first official BSA summer camp program.

==== Akelaland ====
Akelaland was a Cub Scout resident camp located within Trexler Scout Reservation. Formerly it was the "Pioneer Camp", Minsi Trails Council's rustic Scout camp which encompassed over 200 acres (81 ha) of the reservation. In the mid-1980s, the camp was converted to a Cub Scout resident camp. The Pioneer building, a small, one-room building with a wood-burning stove, still stands, as well as other parts of the original camp.

Akelaland had a swimming pool, shooting ranges (for archery and BB guns), an 18-hole miniature golf course, health lodge, trading post, dining hall, parade field, shower houses, and an activities field. The camp also has a waterfront for boating and fishing at Lake Trexler.

==== Settlers Camp ====
Settlers Camp, Trexler Scout Reservation was the Scouts BSA resident Camp portion of the Reservation. It contained three separate ranges, a rifle, a shotgun, and an archery range, a Disk Golf Course, a Gaga Ball Pit, eight program areas of activities, a developed Aquatics program at its Waterfront on Lake Trexler, and a fully featured C.O.P.E./High Adventure Action Center Area.

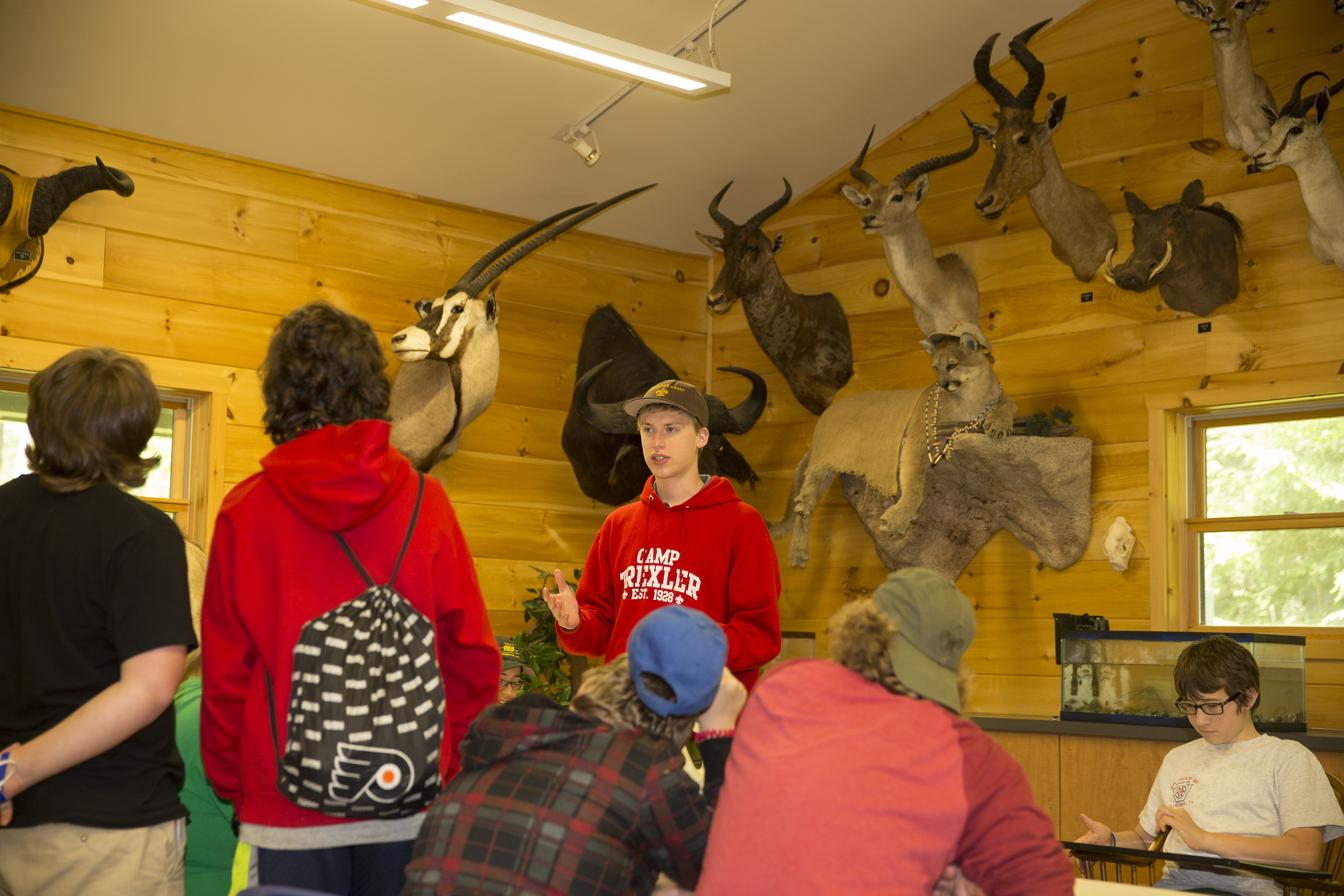
Scouts attend a merit badge class at the Settler's Camp Nature Lodge

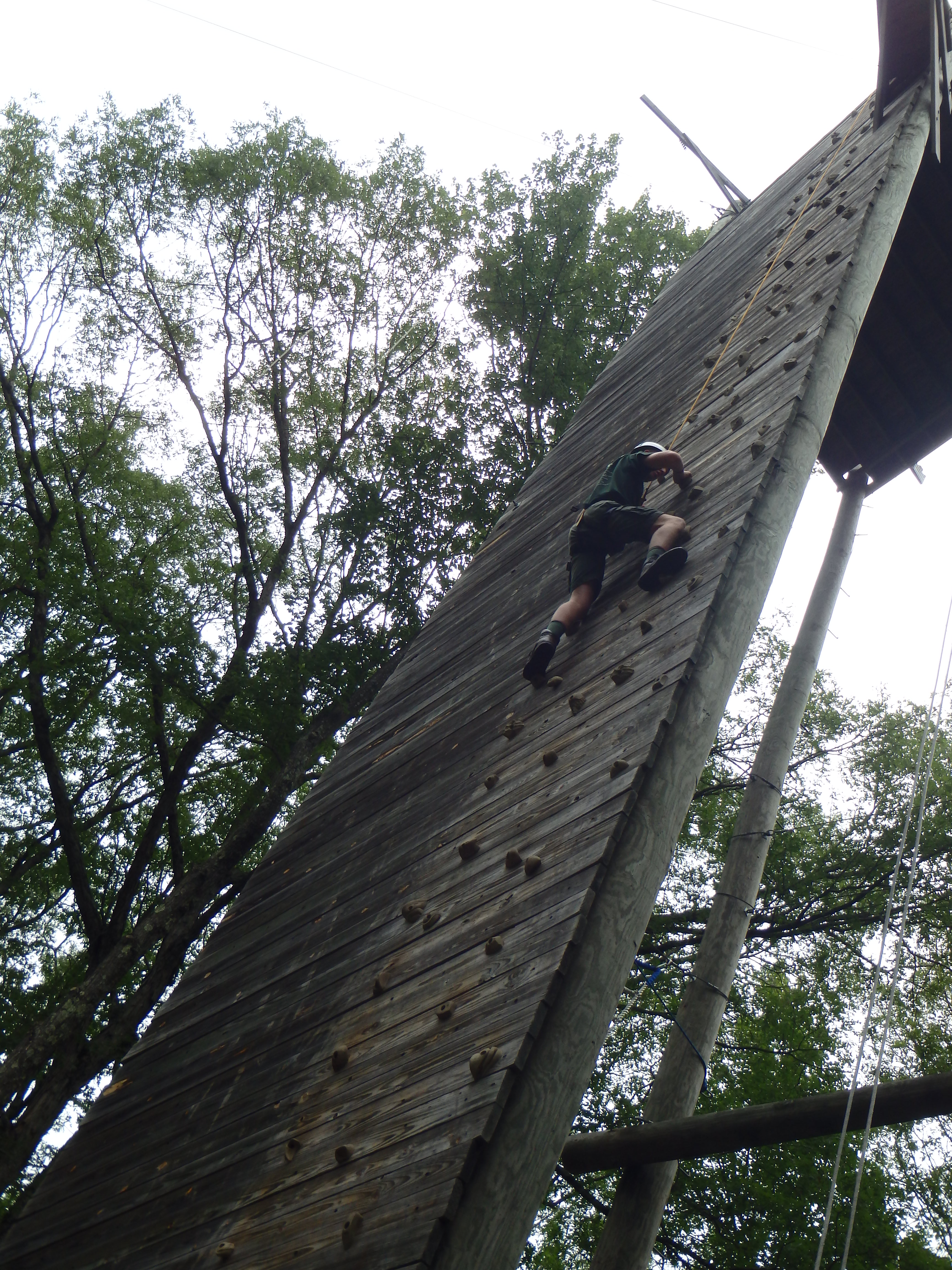
A Scout ascends the Trexler Scout Reservation COPE tower

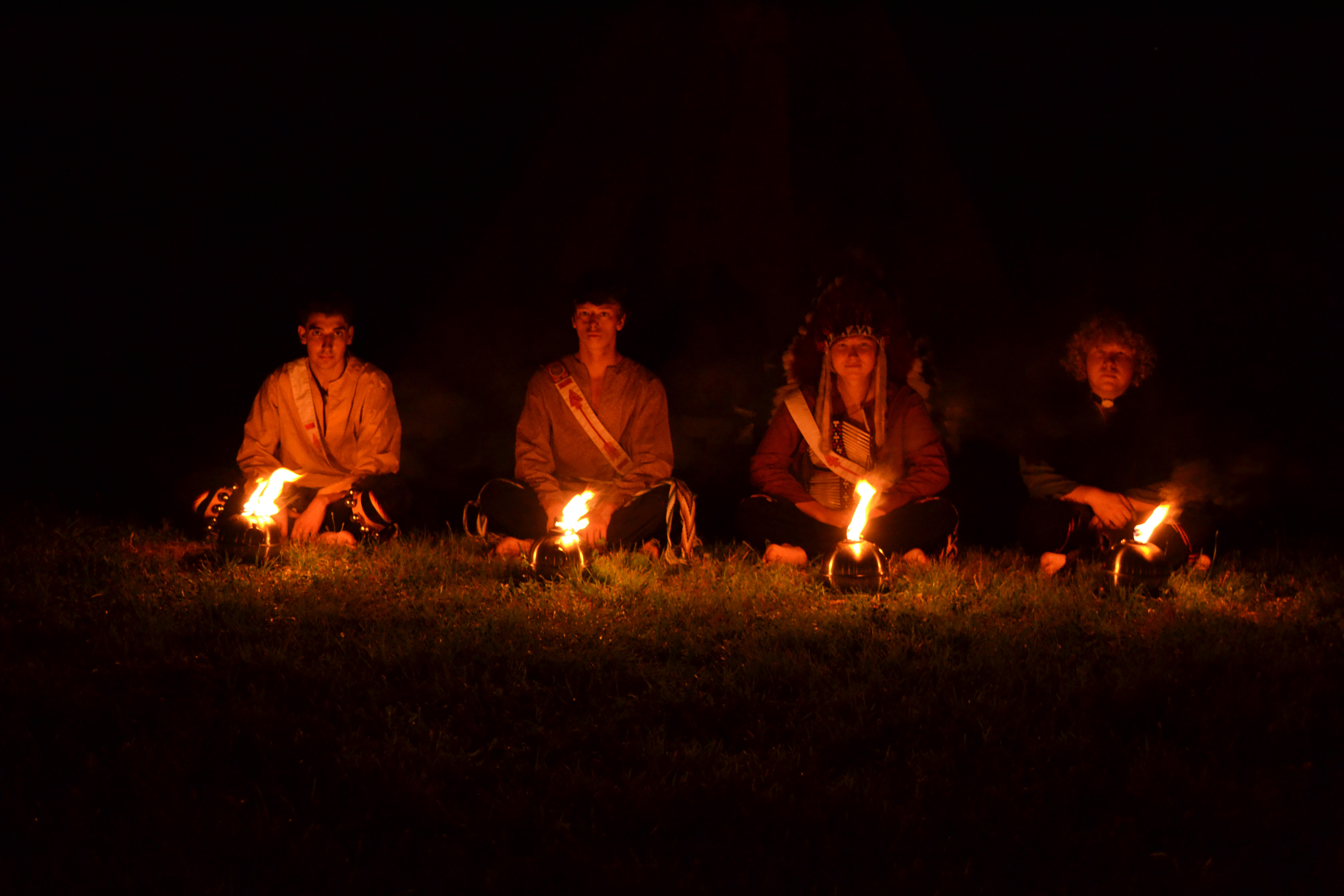
Members of the Order of the Arrow Ceremonies Team during the Settlers Camp OA Call-Out Ceremony

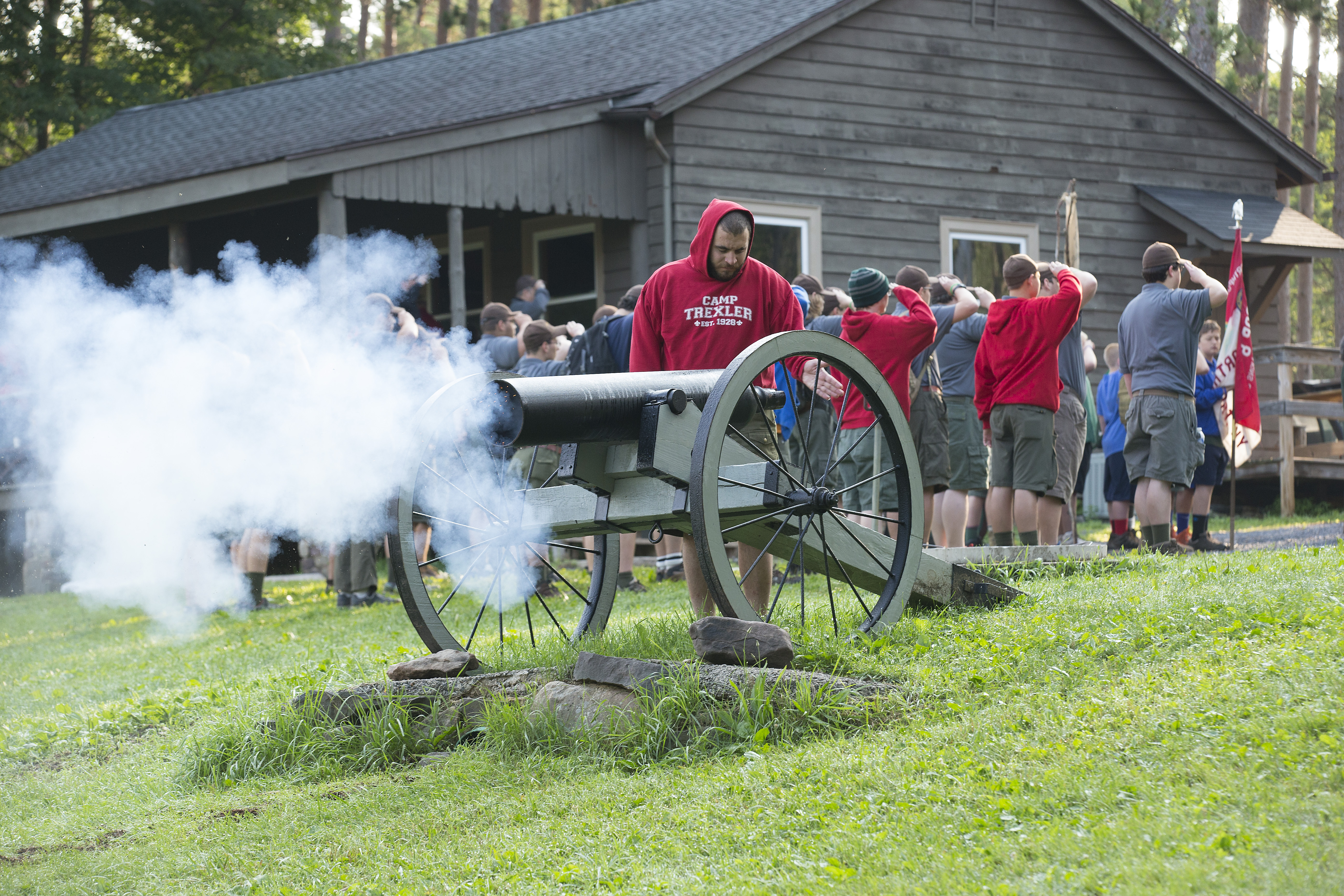
Each Morning the Traditional Cannon Blast is sounded during Morning Colors.

== Order of the Arrow ==
Witauchsoman Lodge
- Founded: 1969
- Lodge Chief: Darren Woodruff
- Lodge Adviser: Scott Best
- Staff Adviser: Brian Dungan

Minsi Trails Council is home to the Witauchsoman Lodge of the Order of the Arrow. Witauchsoman means "to be in fellowship with somebody".

In 1928, thirteen years after the introduction of the Order of the Arrow into Scouting, Minsi Lodge #5 emerged. The Minsi Lodge served the Lehigh Council that operated Trexler Scout Reservation at the time. In 1936, the Pohopoco Lodge #44 replaced the Minsi Lodge. For thirty-three years the Pohopoco Lodge acted as a pilot lodge, helping to start new lodges in the area. The other lodges were the Tunkhannock Lodge #476 of the Bethlehem Area Council operating Camp Minsi, and the Ah'Pace Lodge #58 of the Delaware Valley Area Council operating Camp Weygadt. The tri-merger of the councils and their lodges resulted in Witauchsoman Lodge #44. The totem of the lodge is three peace pipes (symbolizing the three predecessor lodges) strong on a bow. In 1980, a new chapter that formerly served the Anthracite Scouting Organization joined the lodge. This was a result of the organization becoming a new district in the Minsi Trails Council. In 1994, Witauchsoman re-established chapters. Each of the council's five Scouting districts operates a chapter.

=== Chapters ===
- Hakahteyo Osakame Chapter (Carbon-Luzerne District)
- Lechauweki Chapter (Lehigh District)
- Ahtuwi-Kana Chapter (Monroe District)
- Takhone Chapter (Northampton District)
- Nimat Gamink Chapter (Warren District)

== See also ==
- Scouting in Pennsylvania
