= Stillwater Lake (Pennsylvania) =

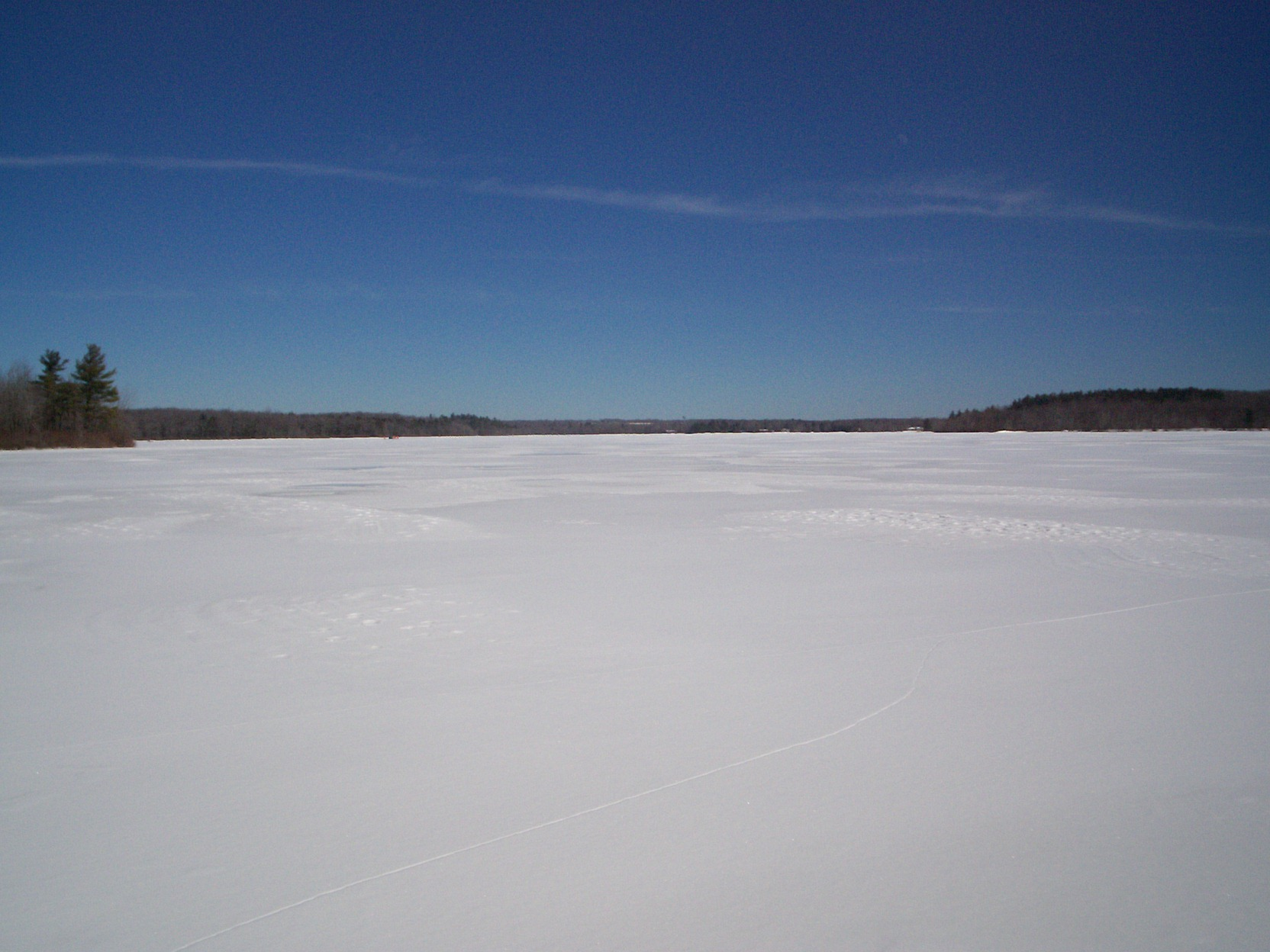
- Stillwater Lake in the winter

- Location within Pennsylvania Location within the United States
- Location: Coolbaugh Township / Tobyhanna Township, Monroe County, Pennsylvania, U.S.
- Coordinates: 41.1219°N 75.4239°W
- Type: artificial lake
- Primary inflows: Dotter's Run Stream; Hawkeye RunStream; Pocono Summit Creek
- Primary outflows: Tunkhannock Creek
- Basin countries: United States
- Max. length: 0.87 mi (1.4 km)
- Max. width: 1.24 mi (2.0 km)
- Surface area: 315 acres (127 ha)
- Average depth: 4.7 ft (1.4 m)
- Max. depth: 8 ft (2.4 m)
- Water volume: 1,480 acre⋅ft (1,830,000 m^{3})
- Surface elevation: 1,811 ft (552 m)
- Islands: 6

Stillwater Lake is a reservoir that covers approximately 315 acres (1.27 km^{2}). The lake is located in Pocono Summit, Pennsylvania, at an elevation of 1,811 feet (552 m). Fed by Dotter's Run, Hawkeye Run, Pocono Summit Creek, and several underground springs, the lake flows out to Lake Naomi via Tunkhannock Creek. There are several Tunkhannock Creeks in the Pocono Mountains in Northeastern Pennsylvania. This one merges with the Tobyhanna at Pocono Lake. The Tobyhanna flows into the Lehigh, and ultimately into Delaware Bay.

The lake is currently home to Stillwater Estates, and to Camp Minsi, a facility owned by the Boy Scouts of America's Minsi Trails Council.

== History ==
The area where the lake is located was once a swamp. The Native Americans of the area called it "Klampeechen Chuppecat" which, in Lenape, translates to deep, dark swamp.

=== 19th century ===
In the 1870s, like most of the land in the Pocono Plateau, the land was clear-cut and harvested for lumber. The swamp was destroyed and cut away to make room for a man-made lake designed to transport the cut timber downstream to sawmills. A dam was built to control the water flow and the level of what was created, called Tunkhannock Lake, while three very small streams and underground springs fed the newly made lake. The Upper Tunkhannock Creek was the major outlet for Tunkhannock Lake and logs were sent down the Upper Tunkhannock Creek, which in 1895 became Lake Naomi, then continuing downstream to a sawmill on Lake Pocono.

=== 20th century ===
With the dwindling forests and growing markets, the businesses who had harvested all of the lumber began looking for new avenues of revenue, and turned to the ice industry. From the late 1880s until the 1930s, the ice industry of the Poconos was king. Several ice companies sprung up in the area as ice was harvested from the shallow freshwater lakes. Pocono Mountain Ice Company, run by Samuel Rubel, became the leading ice company in the area, buying up many of the smaller ice companies. Large ice houses were built around Lake Stillwater to store the large blocks of ice. Remnants of some of those facilities can still be seen on the south and eastern side of the lake today.

Pennsylvania was the nation's third-largest producer of ice, following Maine and New York. Pennsylvania consumed about 1 million tons annually, cut on the state's lakes and rivers. Aside from Stillwater Lake, Pocono Mountain Ice Company harvested ice on Saylor's Lake, Trout Lake, Lake Naomi, Pocono Lake, Mountain Spring Lake, and the Lakes at Tobyhanna. It was reported that the Pocono Mountain Ice Company was harvesting ice for 6 cents per ton. Ice workers out on the lake were paid 30 cents an hour, while those working in the icehouse, where 300-pound ice cakes were being pushed around, were paid 35 cents an hour. The Pocono Mountain Ice Company employed over 500 men during the height of the harvest. Beginning in the 1930s with the advent of refrigeration, the harvesting of the ice from the lakes became less and less profitable. Eventually, the ice companies folded, while still controlling large tracts of land.

In 1949, Samuel Rubel and the Pocono Mountain Ice Company donated a majority of the land around Stillwater Lake to the Boy Scouts of America's Bethlehem Area Council (now Minsi Trails Council). The remaining land was sold to developers and was marketed in the 1960s as Stillwater Lake Estates, a development of approximately 1,000 lots (typically about two-thirds of an acre each), with amenities presently including a beach, community center, playground, nature preserve, tennis courts and marina.

=== 21st century ===
In 2002, the Pennsylvania Department of Environmental Protection (DEP) reclassified the dam on Stillwater Lake as a B2 High Hazard Dam. Funding was approved in the 2006 Pennsylvania State R-CAP Budget to repair the dam, however the legislators were reluctant to release the already approved funds for the project. In May, 2008 Minsi Trails Council (owners of the dam) entered into a consent order and agreement with the DEP specifying a timetable to make the required dam repairs. The council finalized engineering plans and completed the dam permit application in November 2009. The Scouts petitioned the legislators to release the $3,000,000.00 of approved funding in order to repair the dam and save their camp and the watershed and neighboring communities.

In late 2009, $1.31 million was released to upgrade the dam. Construction began in August 2010 with completion in spring 2011. The dam renovation included a new spillway, gate, and a 400-foot rollercompacted concrete dam. The project cost nearly $2-million. The new dam was dedicated in July 2011.

== Gallery ==
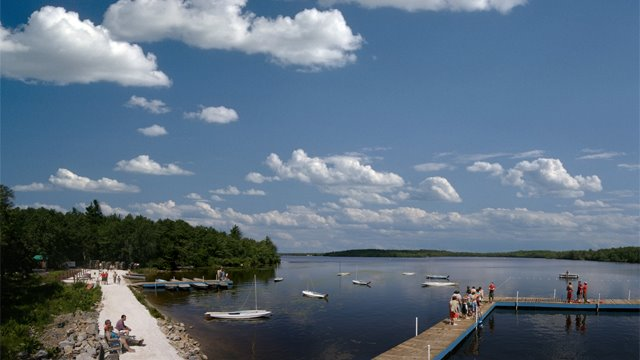
Camp Minsi's Waterfront on Stillwater Lake

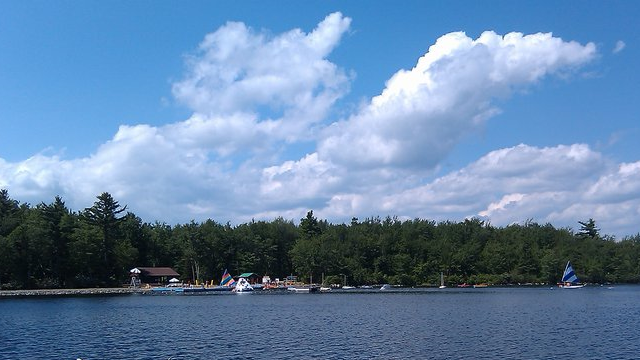
Camp Minsi's Waterfront on Stillwater Lake

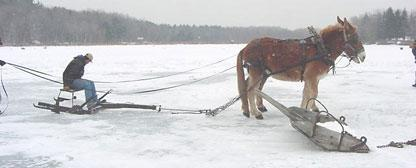
Ice Harvesting
