= Morris Wilkins =

American inventor

Morris Benjamin Wilkins (March 21, 1925 – May 25, 2015) was the inventor of the heart-shaped bathtub and the champagne glass bathtub. He is credited for helping establish the Pocono Mountains in northeast Pennsylvania as the "honeymoon capital of the world."

== Early years ==
The oldest of three children, Wilkins was born in Stroudsburg, Pennsylvania, to immigrants. His father, Benjamin Wilkins, was a tailor from Russia and his mother, the former Rose Katz, was from Hungary. At age 17, shortly after the Japanese attack on Pearl Harbor, Wilkins enlisted in the United States Navy. He served in the Pacific Theater on two submarines, USS Rasher and USS Gurnard, and was trained as an electrician. After his discharge from the Navy, Wilkins started an electrical contracting business, but it was destroyed by Hurricane Diane in 1955.

== Heart-shaped bathtubs ==
In 1958 Wilkins and his partner Harold O'Brien purchased Hotel Pocopaupack on the banks of Lake Wallenpaupack in Lakeville, Pennsylvania. They renamed the hotel Cove Haven and marketed it as a couples-only resort. In 1963 Wilkins invented the heart-shaped bathtub as a way to generate more honeymoon business at the hotel. The tubs cost $3,000 to make and install. Wilkins built the first six tubs himself, pouring concrete into a heart-shaped mold and covering them with red tile. He stated, "I felt that the bathroom was the great neglected honeymoon accommodation. There was already action in the bedroom, but I thought there could be action in the bathroom, too." In January 1971 Life magazine featured a two-page photograph of a couple smooching in one of the red-tiled "sweetheart tubs" at Cove Haven. They described it as "affluent vulgarity."

The heart-shaped tub became a symbol of the Pocono resort business. Rival resorts also installed heart-shaped tubs, as Wilkins had never secured a patent. Author George Cantor wrote, "Wilkins's amorous innovation... helped transform the Poconos into America's premier honeymoon haven." According to Local Flair Magazine, "These iconic tubs symbolized romance and luxury for couples looking to retreat to a scenic and quiet getaway without having to travel far." By the 1980s, resorts all over the world could buy a mass-produced version of the heart-shaped tub in fiberglass or acrylic. The tubs fell out of favor in the 1990s, and a new generation of vacationers considered them tacky.

There were conflicting accounts as to how Wilkins came up with the idea for the tub. Wilkins said, "I woke up in the middle of the night with the idea of a heart-shaped bathtub. I immediately ran down to the basement of my house and drew a big heart on the concrete floor and called Obie [O'Brien]. He came over the next day, and we began planning construction..." Honest Phil Policare, Chief Excitement Officer at Cove Haven, said that Wilkins and O'Brien were planning to put whirlpools in every suite, and the first one they bought was a common circle. "When Wilkins and Obie were carrying the prototype down a flight of stairs, they ran into a corner. In order to make the turn, they needed to distort the shape a bit. When they finally got the bath through, they realized it reflected a heart shape... perfect for a couples resort."

== Caesars World ==
In 1969 Wilkins and O'Brien sold Cove Haven to Caesars World of Las Vegas. Wilkins said, "We had more business than we knew what to do with but had no money for expansion. We had to look for somebody with deep pockets; that's why we sold to Caesars." He became the president and chief operating officer of Caesars Pocono Resorts and opened three other resorts in the Poconos: Paradise Stream, Pocono Palace, and Brookdale. In 1997 Ski Magazine stated that the Caesars Pocono chain captured about one-third of the local couples market. Some of Wilkins's ideas, including mirrors on the ceilings, circular beds, and heart-shaped bathtubs, would appear at other Caesars resorts in Las Vegas and Tahoe.

In the early 1970s he pioneered the concept of the in-room swimming pool. Wilkins later came up with the idea of a champagne glass bathtub, which debuted in 1983. It was a 7-foot-high Plexiglas whirlpool bath shaped like a long-stemmed champagne glass, large enough to accommodate two adults. Wilkins said, "I went to a Caesars board meeting and there I was, sitting around the table with these high-powered guys from Las Vegas. I pulled out a picture of a champagne glass and they looked at me like I was nuts." He said that it cost about $150,000 to design and make the molds for the champagne glass tubs. Speck Plastics in Wind Gap, Pennsylvania, manufactured the tubs for about $15,000 each.

According to Wilkins, "We figured that we would have to build an extraordinary space to house this type of whirlpool, so we designed a four-level suite with a romantic spa-like environment." The suites were known as "Champagne Towers," and they were booked solid for eighteen months before the first one opened. In 1988 Wilkins was granted a patent for the champagne glass bathtub (D294290). Sally Kilbridge, travel editor for Bride's magazine, wrote, "The champagne glass-that was a real engineering marvel." Another travel writer said that sitting in the champagne glass tub "made her feel like the olive in a martini."

== Later years and legacy ==
In December 1999 Wilkins retired from Caesars Pocono Resorts and left the business in the hands of his nephew Douglas Wilkins. He said, "Now that I've given up scuba diving in the Champagne Glass, I'll finally be able to really enjoy the Poconos and the region's fabulous golf courses minus the water hazards, of course!"

After his wife Lois's death in 2002, Wilkins moved to Palm Springs, California, before finally settling in Las Vegas, Nevada. He died of heart failure on May 25, 2015, at the age of ninety, and his funeral was held at Congregation Beth Israel in Honesdale, Pennsylvania. He was buried in Honesdale.

At the time of Wilkins's death, Cove Haven and its sister hotels had 437 heart-shaped whirlpool-equipped bathtubs and 135 seven-foot-tall champagne glass tubs. There were suggestions that his tubs had prurient appeal. Wilkins said, "It's not porno, it's romantic. Anyone who can't see the romance in my tubs just doesn't understand love." He believed that his resorts had lasting effects on honeymoon couples; "We feel the divorce rate from our places is much lower [than the national average] because they get a great start."

Author Lawrence Squeri wrote in 2002, "If Americans today are asked to name the image that best represents the Poconos, chances are that many will cite couples resorts and heart-shaped bathtubs... And the one name continually linked to couples resorts is that of Morris Wilkins." Carl Wilgus, President and CEO of the Pocono Mountains Visitors Bureau, credited Wilkins and other marketers for developing a "mystic, romantic view of the Pocono Mountains." In 1998 Terry Bivens of The Philadelphia Inquirer referred to Wilkins as the "Thomas Edison of Loveland." Jim Nolan of the Philadelphia Daily News wrote in 2000, "Morris Wilkins has done more for romance than a box of chocolates."

== Notes ==
Some obituaries erroneously state that Wilkins retired from Caesars Pocono Resorts in 1997, but his retirement was announced in news sources from 1999.

In the 1982 television movie For Lovers Only shot at Cove Haven, Andy Griffith played hotel proprietor Vernon Bliss. Some sources erroneously state that Griffith played Morris Wilkins.
