= Woodloch Pines =

Resort in Hawley, Pennsylvania

Coordinates: 41°31′10″N 75°05′21″W

Woodloch Pines (also known as Woodloch) is an all-inclusive resort located in Hawley, Pennsylvania on Lake Teedyuskung in the northeast Pocono Mountains Lake Region. The resort has been owned by the Kiesendahl Family since 1958 and is open all year round. In 1991, Woodloch expanded to include Woodloch Springs, a championship golf course and housing community. In 2006, The Lodge at Woodloch, a destination spa opened. Woodloch Pines, Woodloch Springs, and The Lodge at Woodloch are all separate resorts in Hawley, Pennsylvania.

== History ==
Mary Mould had been vacationing at Lake Teedyuskung for years when she married Harry Kiesendahl in 1944. They settled on Long Island where they raised their 3 children, John, Nancy, and Steve. Harry saw an advertisement in the New York Times for a small boarding house for sale on Lake Teedyuskung. Soon after, the Kiesendahls purchased the resort. In 1958, Mary and the children moved to the resort while Harry commuted from Long Island on the weekends. Its original 12 acres (49,000 m^{2}) consisted of a main lodge, an annex, and two cottages, which could accommodate 40 guests. There was no running water and one year-round employee.

In 1959, Mary and Harry Kiesendahl were joined by friends Don and Marge Kranich. After several years of building, Woodloch Pines had doubled in size. By 1983, the resort covered 150 acres (0.61 km^{2}), 1-mile (1.6 km) of shoreline on Lake Teedyuskung, and had 135 guest rooms. Woodloch is currently on 1,000 acres (4.0 km^{2}) and can accommodate over 900 guests.

In 1981, the second generation took over the ownership of Woodloch when Harry and Mary’s son, John Kiesendahl, purchased the resort from the owners.

Woodloch is still run by the Kiesendahl family, with John's son, Bradley Kiesendahl as the current president and CEO.

== Woodloch and the Boy Scouts of America ==
Daniel Carter Beard, one of the original founders of the Boy Scouts of America, once owned three parcels of land on Lake Teedyuskung and built the original cabin home of the Boy Scouts there. "Wild Lands" was the mess hall for the Boy Scouts and stood on what eventually became Woodloch property for over eighty years. In 2011, Woodloch donated "Wild Lands" back to the Boy Scouts. The cabin was disassembled and transported to the Goose Pond Boy Scout Reservation on Lake Wallenpaupack, where the project of reassembling the cabin in its original form has taken place.

== Additions ==
Woodloch Springs, opened in 1991, is a community and golf course with over 400 homes of varying sizes that can be purchased or rented by Woodloch guests. The Springs has also been used for corporate retreats.

The Lodge at Woodloch is a destination spa that opened in 2006. The Lodge, designed by architecture firm Cooper Carry, is a separate facility from the Pines at Woodloch. It is five minutes away from The Pines, across the street from the Springs at Woodloch Springs, on Little Lake Teedyuskung. The spa resort is co-owned and operated by the Kiesendahl family.

Woodloch won the "#1 Best Resort for Families in 2024" by USA Today, Best All-Inclusive Family Resort by Newsweek in 2025, The 20 Best All-Inclusive Resorts For Families by Forbes, and Best Family Travel Awards by Good Housekeeping 2023-2025.
