= Oakdene/Waldene =

Coordinates: 40.798°N 73.652°W

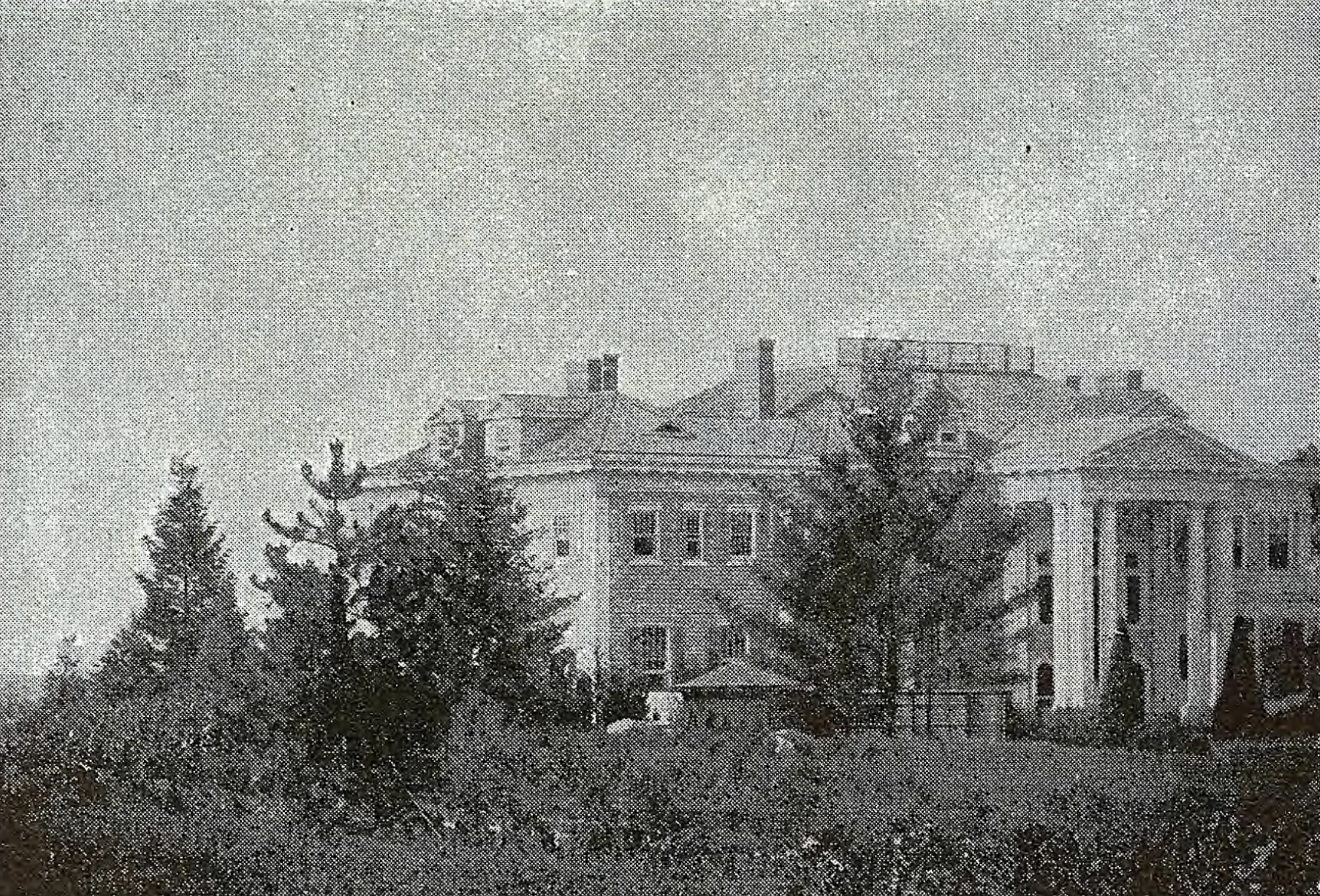
- Oakdene as pictured with its expansive gardens.
- Interactive map of the Oakdene/Waldene area

General information
- Status: Demolished
- Location: Roslyn, New York
- Completed: c. 1900
- Destroyed: 1946

Design and construction
- Architect: Grosvenor Atterbury

Oakdene (later known as Waldene and then as Bernora) was a Gold Coast-era estate in Roslyn, on Long Island, in New York, United States.

== History ==
Oakdene was constructed for executive Walter George Oakman, Sr. ca. 1900. The main building, a Colonial Revival mansion consisting of around 32 rooms (although some sources say 37), was designed by Grosvenor Atterbury. The estate also consisted of farm buildings and a horse stable. The estate occupied roughly 68 acres (28 ha) of land.

Henry D. Walbridge purchased the estate in 1912. He subsequently renamed the estate from Oakdene to Waldene. It is also known that the Walbridge family had installed a pipe organ in the mansion.

In 1935, Waldene was put on the market for $297,500 (1935 USD).

Around 1946, Waldene was purchased by Samuel Rubel. Rubel renamed the mansion Bernora.

=== Fate ===
In 1946, the mansion was destroyed by a fire. The property was soon purchased by developers. After the developers purchased the property, the estate was redeveloped as a housing development called Roslyn Pines in the early 1950s.

== See also ==
- Harbor Hill – Another Gold Coast estate in the Greater Roslyn area, in nearby East Hills.
