= Lake Teedyuskung =

- Location within Pennsylvania
- Location: Pike County, Pennsylvania
- Coordinates: 41°31′01″N 75°05′38″W
- Type: reservoir
- Basin countries: United States
- Surface area: 79 acres (32 ha)
- Surface elevation: 1,266 ft (386 m)

Lake Teedyuskung is a 79 acres (32 ha) reservoir located in Lackawaxen Township, Pennsylvania. The 9 acres (3.6 ha) Little Teedyuskung Lake is also located in Pike County.

In the early 20th century, Lake Teedyuskung was the site of the Dan Beard Outdoor School, a private school. It is home to Woodloch Pines, a family resort.

== See also ==
- List of lakes in Pennsylvania
