= Pocono Mountains =

Geographic highland and cultural region in Pennsylvania, United States

The Poconos
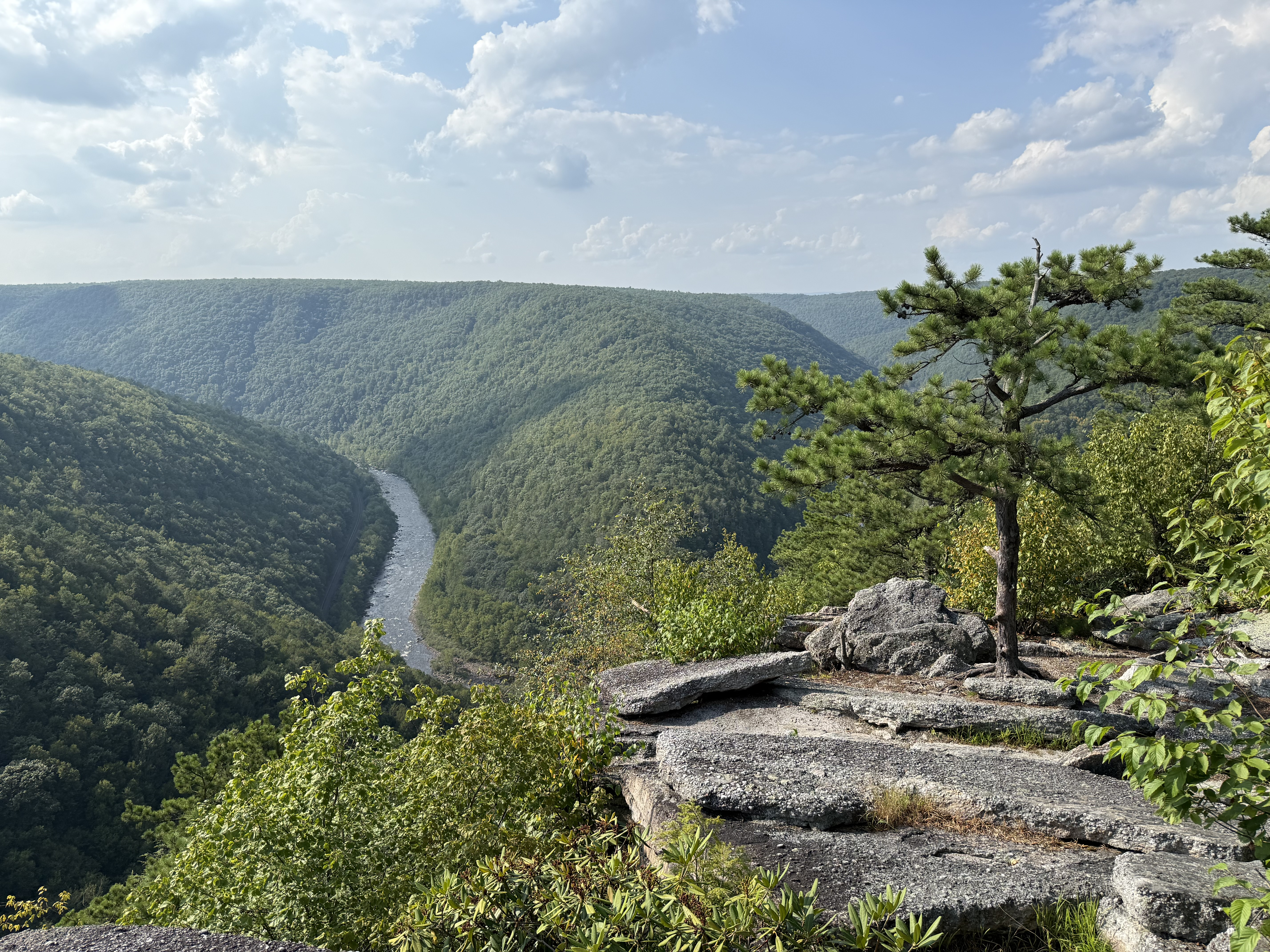
- Tank Hollow Overlook, Lehigh Gorge, Penn Forest Township

Highest point
- Peak: Moosic Mountain High Point
- Elevation: 2,311 ft (704 m)
- Coordinates: 41°13′44″N 75°22′24″W

Naming
- Etymology: Lenape term for "stream between two mountains".

Geography

The Pocono Mountains, commonly referred to as the Poconos (/ˈpoʊkənoʊz/), are a geographical, geological, and cultural region in Northeastern Pennsylvania. They overlook the Delaware River and Delaware Water Gap to the east, Lake Wallenpaupack to the north, the Wyoming Valley and the Coal Region to the west and the Lehigh Valley to the south. The name Pocono is derived from the Munsee word Pokawachne, which means "Creek Between Two Hills".

Much of the Poconos region lies within the Greater New York–Newark, NY–NJ–CT–PA Combined Statistical Area. The wooded hills and valleys have long been a popular recreation area, accessible within a two-hour drive to millions of metropolitan area residents, with many Pocono communities having resort hotels with fishing, hunting, skiing, and other sports facilities.

Although referred to usually as a mountain range, the area is actually an approximately 2,400-square-mile (6,200 km^{2}) plateau. It is considered a sub-section of the larger Allegheny Plateau, and like most plateaus, is bordered by a notable escarpment. Despite these technicalities, it is considered a subrange of the Appalachian Mountains.

== Population ==
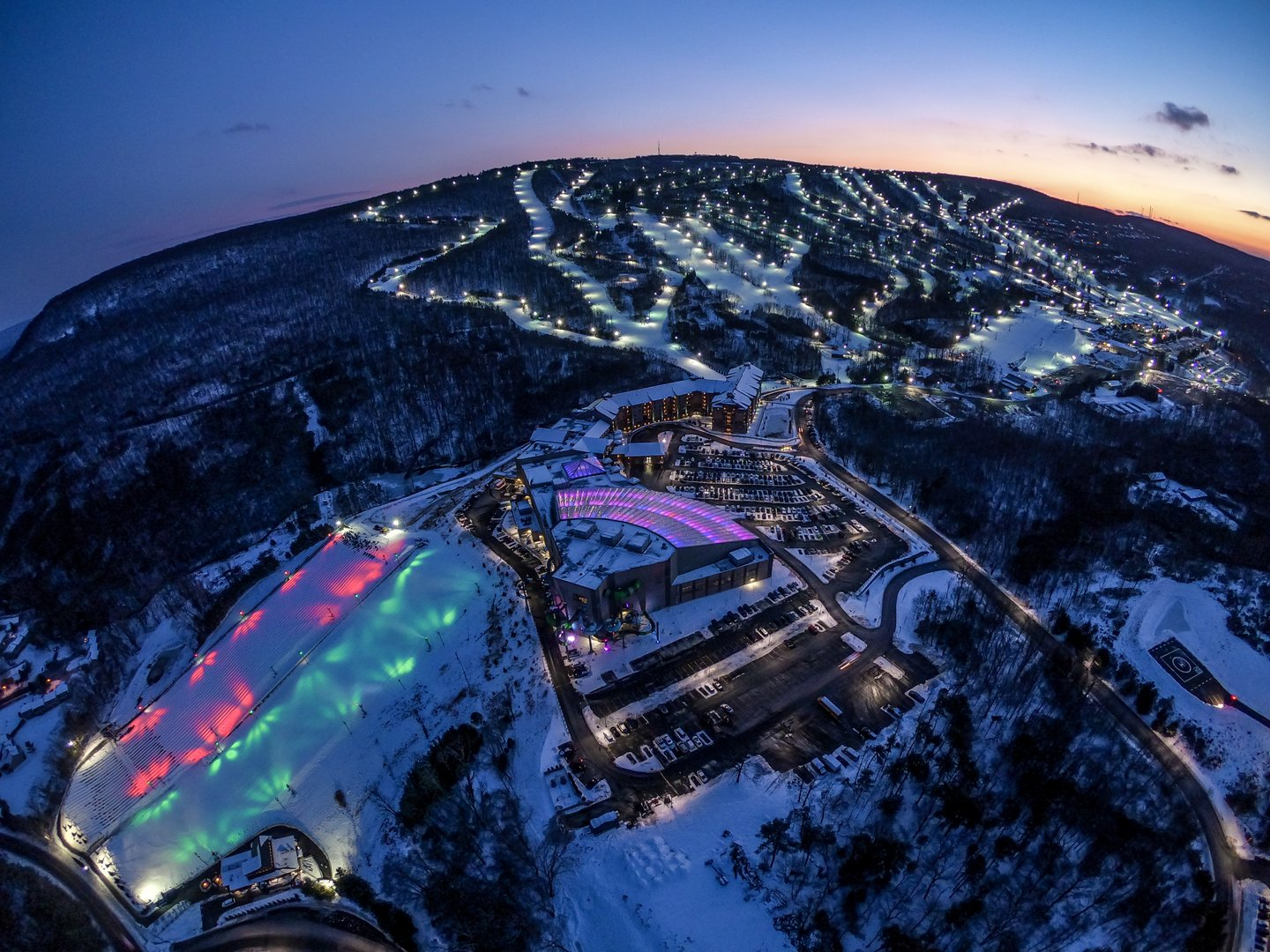
An aerial nighttime view of Camelback Mountain Resort in Tannersville, the largest ski resort of the Poconos

The Pocono Mountains are a popular recreational destination. While the area has long been a popular tourist destination, many communities have seen a rise in population, especially communities within Monroe County and Pike County. The region has a population of about 340,300, which is growing at a rapid pace. The Poconos now serve as a commuter community for New York City and North Jersey. The commute to workplaces often takes as much as two hours each way due to traffic.

The region includes three major municipalities: Stroudsburg, East Stroudsburg, and Mount Pocono, all located in Monroe County, Pennsylvania.

== Municipalities and communities ==
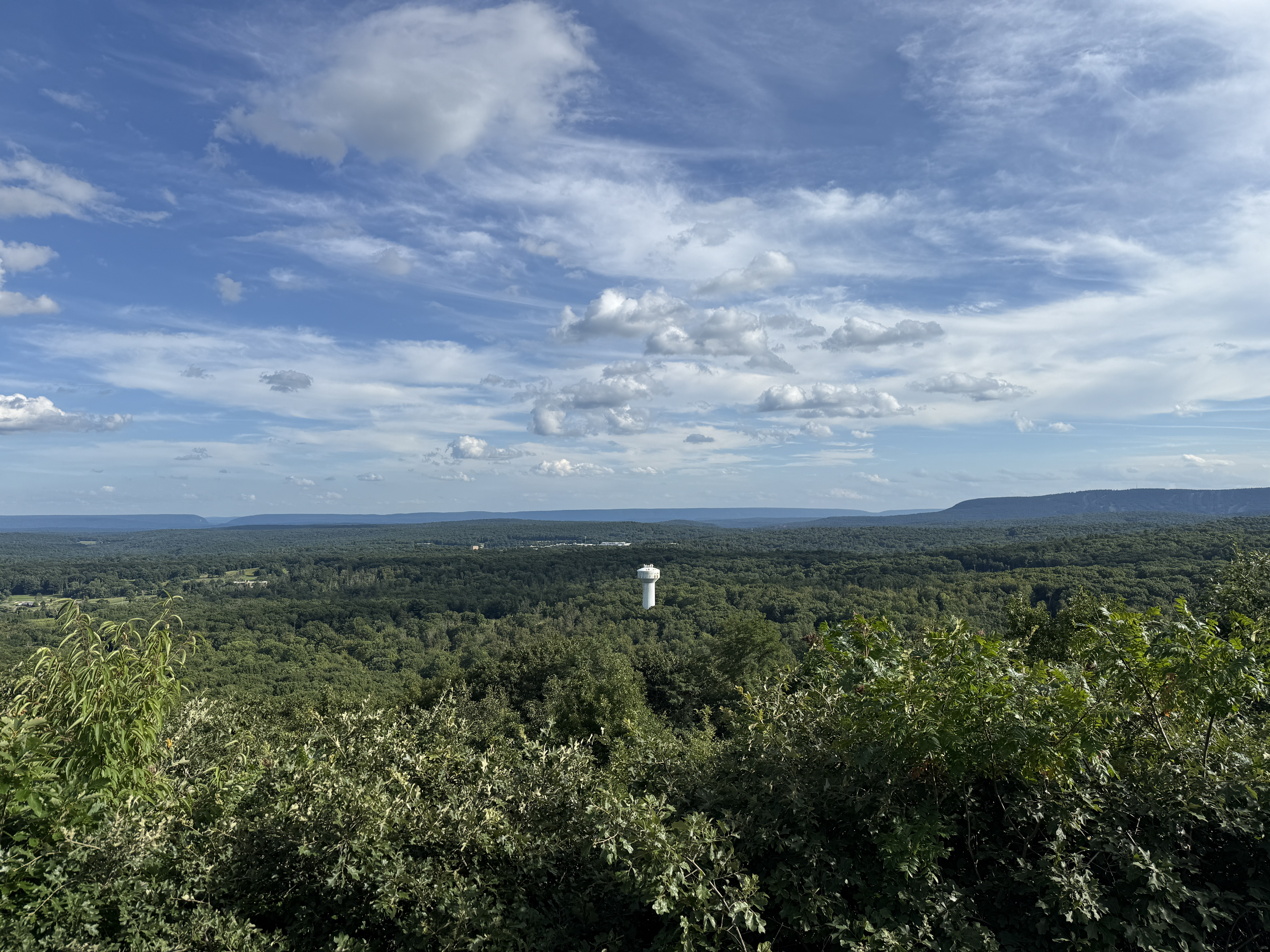
View of the Pocono Mountains from The Knob Overlook in Mount Pocono

The Pocono Mountains of Northeastern Pennsylvania are divided into six regions: the Mountain Region, the Lake Region, the Delaware River Region, the Upper Delaware River Region, the Wyoming Valley, and the Lehigh River Gorge Region.

== Transportation ==
=== Roads ===
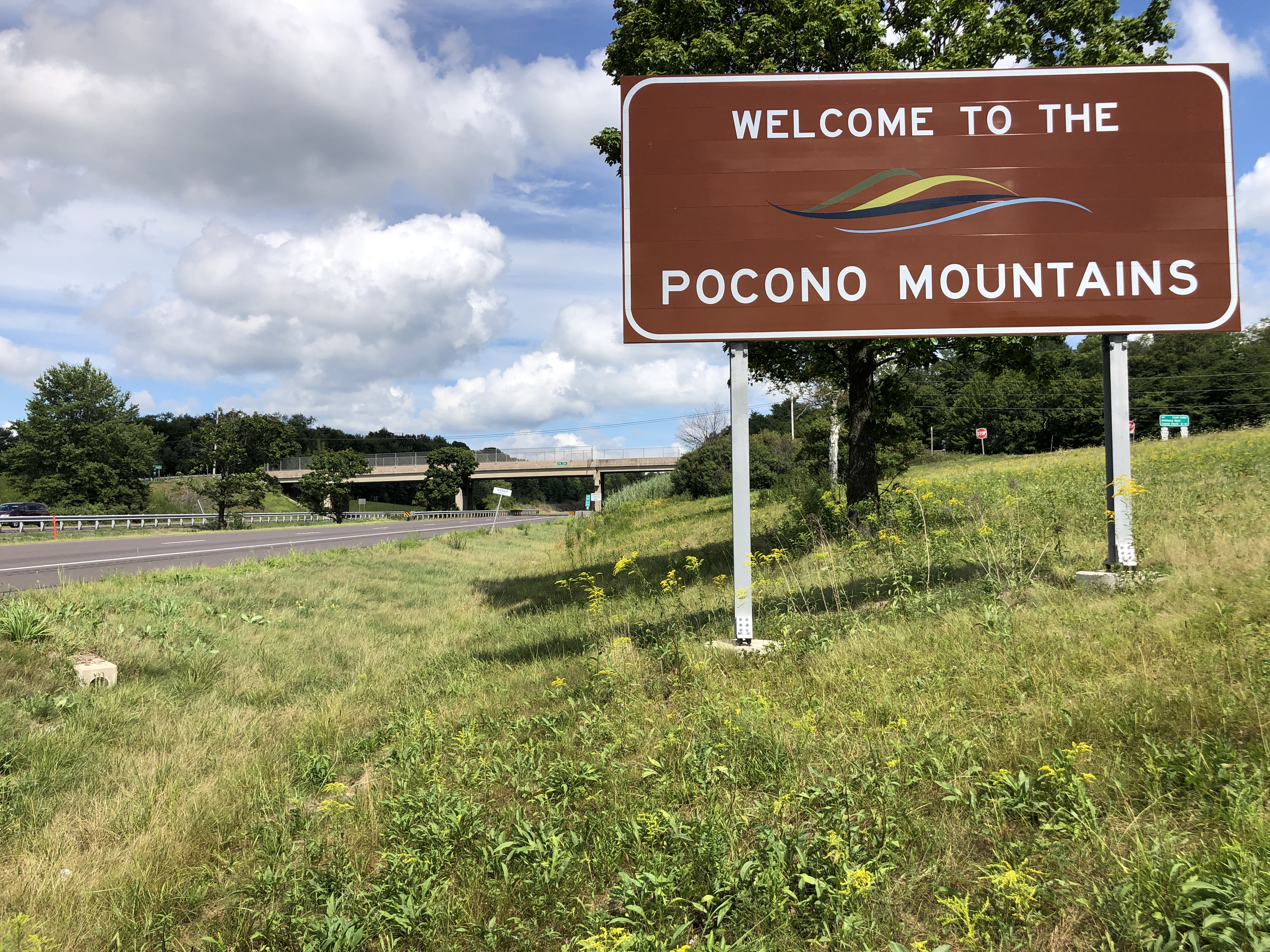
Sign on I-80 eastbound welcoming motorists to the Pocono Mountains

The Poconos are served by many state highways. The most used of these highways include PA 115, PA 715, PA 903 (designated in some areas as the "Highway to Adventure" because of the numerous venues and resorts along the highway), Pennsylvania Route 33, Pennsylvania Route 940, and PA 611. PA 309, a major north-south route connecting Northeastern Pennsylvania with the Philadelphia metropolitan area, passes through the western end of the region.

There are two U.S. highways in the Pocono Mountains Region. The more used is US 209, which goes from Ulster, New York, to Millersburg, Pennsylvania near Harrisburg. The route's midpoint is in the region north of Stroudsburg. The other main U.S. Highway in the region is US 6, which is a transcontinental highway that starts near Bishop, California, and runs for over 3,000 miles (4,800 km) to its eastern terminus in Provincetown, Massachusetts. It is designated a scenic route in Pennsylvania. US 11, US 22, and US 46 are also not far from the region and serve it indirectly.

The main east-west interstate highway in the region is I-80, off which branches I-380, which connects the Poconos to Scranton. The other interstate highways in the region in I-476, the Pennsylvania Turnpike's Northeast Extension, which has interchanges near Lehighton (Mahoning Valley), Albrightsville (Route 903), and White Haven (Pocono), and I-81, which serves as an alternate route for the much busier I-87 and I-95, particularly for travelers from Toronto, Syracuse, Binghamton and Montreal to Philadelphia, Baltimore, and Washington, D.C. Other interstates that serve the region are I-84, which begins in Scranton and goes east to New England, and I-78, by way of Route 33 or Route 309.

=== Restoration of passenger rail service ===
NJ Transit is rebuilding trackage on the Lackawanna Cut-Off route from Scranton through the Poconos to Hoboken, New Jersey. There is no estimated target year when the Lackawanna Cut-Off Restoration Project will be completed for the Poconos. The service would consist of nine trains per day in each direction. In April 2022, the NJ Transit board approved a $32.5 million contract for improving a tunnel and restoring track to part of the line between Blairstown, New Jersey and Port Morris Junction, New Jersey, a segment in which trackage had been removed in the 1980s.

Until 1970, the Erie Lackawanna Railway operated long-distance trains through the Poconos to Buffalo and Chicago to the west, and Hoboken to the east; the last Erie Lackawanna train to run this route was Lake Cities, which operated from 1939 to 1970.

=== Air travel ===
Two airports are located just outside the region: Wilkes-Barre/Scranton International Airport and Lehigh Valley International Airport.

== Geography ==
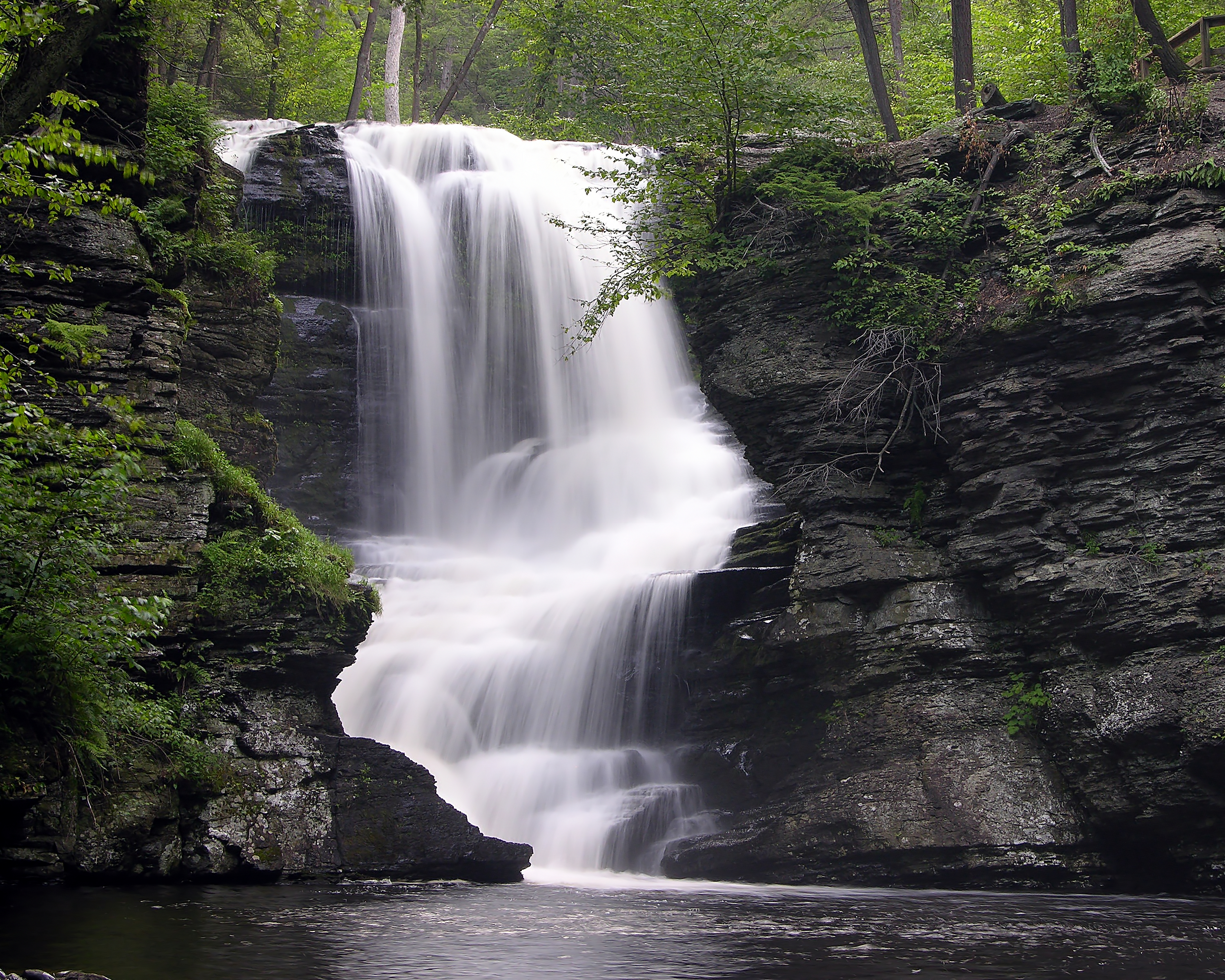
Fulmer Falls in the Childs Recreation Area

The Pocono Mountains is a defined area encompassing portions of Carbon, Monroe, Pike, and southern Wayne counties in Pennsylvania. In total, the Poconos encompasses over 2,500 square miles (6,500 km^{2}). Some definitions also extend the Poconos to Lackawanna, Luzerne, eastern Schuylkill, and Susquehanna counties. The Poconos are geologically part of the Allegheny Plateau, like the nearby Catskills. The Poconos' highest summit, Big Pine Hill, reaches 2,280 feet (690 m), while its lowest elevation is 350 feet (110 m) in Pike County.

The Delaware River flows through the Pocono Mountains and gives the region its name, from a Native American term roughly translating to "stream between two mountains". The Lehigh and Lackawaxen Rivers also flow through the region, totaling about 170 miles (270 km) of waterways.

== Climate ==
=== Glaciated Low Plateau region ===
According to the Trewartha climate classification system, the Glaciated Low Plateau region of the northern and eastern Poconos has a Temperate Continental climate (Dc) with warm summers (b), cold winters (o) and year-around precipitation (Dcbo). Dcbo climates are characterized by at least one month having an average mean temperature ≤ 32.0 °F (0.0 °C), four to seven months with an average mean temperature ≥ 50.0 °F (10.0 °C), all months with an average mean temperature < 72.0 °F (22.2 °C) and no significant precipitation difference between seasons. Although most summer days are comfortably humid on the Low Plateau, episodes of heat and high humidity can occur with heat index values > 93 °F (34 °C). Since 1981, the highest air temperature was 94.1 °F (34.5 °C) on 08/06/2001, and the highest daily average mean dew point was 70.8 °F (21.6 °C) on 08/01/2006. July is the peak month for thunderstorm activity which correlates with the average warmest month of the year. Since 1981, the wettest calendar day was 5.83 inches (148 mm) on 09/17/2004. During the winter months, the plant hardiness zone is 5b with an average annual extreme minimum air temperature of −13.1 °F (−25.1 °C). Since 1981, the coldest air temperature was −27.9 °F (−33.3 °C) on 01/21/1994. Episodes of extreme cold and wind can occur with wind chill values less than −26 °F (−32 °C). The average snowiest month is January which correlates with the average coldest month of the year. Ice storms and large snowstorms depositing ≥ 12 inches (30 cm) of snow occur nearly every year, particularly during nor'easters from December through March.

Climate data for Lake Wallenpaupack, Elevation 1,188 ft (362 m), 1981-2010 normals, extremes 1981-2018
Month	Jan	Feb	Mar	Apr	May	Jun	Jul	Aug	Sep	Oct	Nov	Dec	Year
Record high °F (°C)	63.2 (17.3)	72.2 (22.3)	82.5 (28.1)	87.8 (31.0)	91.0 (32.8)	90.7 (32.6)	93.9 (34.4)	94.1 (34.5)	91.0 (32.8)	83.1 (28.4)	79.0 (26.1)	67.5 (19.7)	94.1 (34.5)
Mean daily maximum °F (°C)	32.2 (0.1)	35.3 (1.8)	43.6 (6.4)	56.0 (13.3)	67.1 (19.5)	75.1 (23.9)	78.7 (25.9)	78.1 (25.6)	71.0 (21.7)	59.8 (15.4)	48.2 (9.0)	36.4 (2.4)	56.9 (13.8)
Daily mean °F (°C)	22.5 (−5.3)	25.0 (−3.9)	32.9 (0.5)	44.6 (7.0)	55.2 (12.9)	64.0 (17.8)	67.9 (19.9)	66.9 (19.4)	59.4 (15.2)	48.0 (8.9)	38.6 (3.7)	27.7 (−2.4)	46.2 (7.9)
Mean daily minimum °F (°C)	12.9 (−10.6)	14.8 (−9.6)	22.1 (−5.5)	33.2 (0.7)	43.4 (6.3)	53.0 (11.7)	57.1 (13.9)	55.7 (13.2)	47.7 (8.7)	36.3 (2.4)	29.0 (−1.7)	18.9 (−7.3)	35.4 (1.9)
Record low °F (°C)	−27.9 (−33.3)	−17.3 (−27.4)	−10.0 (−23.3)	9.9 (−12.3)	25.1 (−3.8)	31.4 (−0.3)	40.4 (4.7)	35.9 (2.2)	26.6 (−3.0)	16.3 (−8.7)	−1.9 (−18.8)	−17.2 (−27.3)	−27.9 (−33.3)
Average precipitation inches (mm)	2.82 (72)	2.55 (65)	3.18 (81)	3.62 (92)	3.99 (101)	4.46 (113)	3.89 (99)	3.77 (96)	4.21 (107)	4.18 (106)	3.37 (86)	3.32 (84)	43.36 (1,101)
Average snowfall inches (cm)	15.7 (40)	11.2 (28)	11.7 (30)	2.8 (7.1)	0.0 (0.0)	0.0 (0.0)	0.0 (0.0)	0.0 (0.0)	0.0 (0.0)	0.1 (0.25)	3.0 (7.6)	9.4 (24)	53.8 (137)
Average relative humidity (%)	73.5	68.8	63.6	60.3	62.9	72.5	72.7	74.4	75.1	71.4	71.3	73.7	70.0
Average dew point °F (°C)	15.3 (−9.3)	16.2 (−8.8)	21.9 (−5.6)	31.7 (−0.2)	42.8 (6.0)	55.0 (12.8)	58.8 (14.9)	58.5 (14.7)	51.5 (10.8)	39.2 (4.0)	30.1 (−1.1)	20.4 (−6.4)	36.9 (2.7)
Source: PRISM

=== Glaciated Pocono Plateau region ===
According to the Trewartha climate classification system, the Glaciated Pocono Plateau region of the central and western Poconos has a Temperate Continental climate (Dc) with warm summers (b), cold winters (o) and year-around precipitation (Dcbo). Dcbo climates are characterized by at least one month having an average mean temperature ≤ 32.0 °F (0.0 °C), four to seven months with an average mean temperature ≥ 50.0 °F (10.0 °C), all months with an average mean temperature < 72.0 °F (22.2 °C) and no significant precipitation difference between seasons. Although most summer days are comfortably humid on the Pocono Plateau, episodes of heat and high humidity can occur with heat index values > 93 °F (34 °C). Since 1981, the highest air temperature was 94.0 °F (34.4 °C) on 07/22/2011, and the highest daily average mean dew point was 70.7 °F (21.5 °C) on 08/01/2006. July is the peak month for thunderstorm activity which correlates with the average warmest month of the year. Since 1981, the wettest calendar day was 6.81 inches (173 mm) on 09/30/2010. During the winter months, the plant hardiness zone is 5b with an average annual extreme minimum air temperature of −10.1 °F (−23.4 °C). Since 1981, the coldest air temperature was −21.6 °F (−29.8 °C) on 01/21/1994. Episodes of extreme cold and wind can occur with wind chill values < −22 °F (−30 °C). The average snowiest month is January which correlates with the average coldest month of the year. Ice storms and large snowstorms depositing ≥ 12 inches (30 cm) of snow occur nearly every year, particularly during nor'easters from December through March.

Climate data for Mount Pocono, Elevation 1,808 ft (551 m), 1981-2010 normals, extremes 1981-2018
Month	Jan	Feb	Mar	Apr	May	Jun	Jul	Aug	Sep	Oct	Nov	Dec	Year
Record high °F (°C)	61.7 (16.5)	72.1 (22.3)	81.2 (27.3)	87.3 (30.7)	89.6 (32.0)	89.9 (32.2)	94.0 (34.4)	92.2 (33.4)	90.3 (32.4)	82.3 (27.9)	74.7 (23.7)	66.1 (18.9)	94.0 (34.4)
Mean daily maximum °F (°C)	31.1 (−0.5)	34.4 (1.3)	42.6 (5.9)	55.4 (13.0)	66.4 (19.1)	74.1 (23.4)	78.3 (25.7)	76.8 (24.9)	69.8 (21.0)	58.2 (14.6)	47.0 (8.3)	35.2 (1.8)	55.9 (13.3)
Daily mean °F (°C)	23.0 (−5.0)	25.7 (−3.5)	33.3 (0.7)	44.8 (7.1)	55.3 (12.9)	63.6 (17.6)	68.0 (20.0)	66.7 (19.3)	59.7 (15.4)	48.4 (9.1)	38.8 (3.8)	27.7 (−2.4)	46.3 (7.9)
Mean daily minimum °F (°C)	15.0 (−9.4)	16.9 (−8.4)	24.0 (−4.4)	34.3 (1.3)	44.3 (6.8)	53.2 (11.8)	57.7 (14.3)	56.7 (13.7)	49.6 (9.8)	38.5 (3.6)	30.5 (−0.8)	20.2 (−6.6)	36.8 (2.7)
Record low °F (°C)	−21.6 (−29.8)	−13.6 (−25.3)	−6.6 (−21.4)	10.6 (−11.9)	27.0 (−2.8)	32.9 (0.5)	37.6 (3.1)	33.8 (1.0)	27.8 (−2.3)	17.2 (−8.2)	−0.7 (−18.2)	−14.8 (−26.0)	−21.6 (−29.8)
Average precipitation inches (mm)	3.73 (95)	3.37 (86)	4.54 (115)	4.55 (116)	4.71 (120)	4.86 (123)	4.71 (120)	4.43 (113)	5.21 (132)	5.79 (147)	4.45 (113)	4.49 (114)	54.84 (1,393)
Average snowfall inches (cm)	19.3 (49)	13.8 (35)	14.3 (36)	3.4 (8.6)	0.0 (0.0)	0.0 (0.0)	0.0 (0.0)	0.0 (0.0)	0.0 (0.0)	0.1 (0.25)	3.6 (9.1)	11.6 (29)	66.2 (168)
Average relative humidity (%)	75.5	69.2	66.4	61.6	63.4	73.8	72.9	76.3	77.1	73.4	72.7	76.9	71.6
Average dew point °F (°C)	16.4 (−8.7)	17.0 (−8.3)	23.3 (−4.8)	32.4 (0.2)	43.1 (6.2)	55.1 (12.8)	59.0 (15.0)	59.0 (15.0)	52.5 (11.4)	40.3 (4.6)	30.8 (−0.7)	21.4 (−5.9)	37.6 (3.1)
Source: PRISM

=== Ridge and Valley region ===
According to the Trewartha climate classification system, the Ridge and Valley section of the southern Poconos has a Temperate Continental climate (Dc) with hot summers (a), cold winters (o) and year-round precipitation (Dcao). Dcao climates are characterized by at least one month having an average mean temperature ≤ 32.0 °F (0.0 °C), four to seven months with an average mean temperature ≥ 50.0 °F (10.0 °C), at least one month with an average mean temperature ≥ 72.0 °F (22.2 °C) and no significant precipitation difference between seasons. Although most summer days are slightly humid in the Ridge and Valley, episodes of heat and high humidity can occur with heat index values > 102 °F (39 °C). Since 1981, the highest air temperature was 100.3 °F (37.9 °C) on 07/22/2011, and the highest daily average mean dew point was 72.7 °F (22.6 °C) on 08/01/2006. July is the peak month for thunderstorm activity which correlates with the average warmest month of the year. The average wettest month is September which correlates with tropical storm remnants during the peak of the Atlantic hurricane season. Since 1981, the wettest calendar day was 6.36 inches (162 mm) on 10/08/2005. During the winter months, the plant hardiness zone is 6a with an average annual extreme minimum air temperature of −5.4 °F (−20.8 °C). Since 1981, the coldest air temperature was −18.0 °F (−27.8 °C) on 01/21/1994. Episodes of extreme cold and wind can occur with wind chill values < −17 °F (−27 °C). The average snowiest month is January which correlates with the average coldest month of the year. Ice storms and large snowstorms depositing ≥ 12 inches (30 cm) of snow occur once every couple of years, particularly during nor'easters from December through March.

Climate data for East Stroudsburg, Elevation 531 ft (162 m), 1981-2010 normals, extremes 1981-2018
Month	Jan	Feb	Mar	Apr	May	Jun	Jul	Aug	Sep	Oct	Nov	Dec	Year
Record high °F (°C)	68.6 (20.3)	77.0 (25.0)	86.3 (30.2)	94.4 (34.7)	94.5 (34.7)	95.3 (35.2)	100.3 (37.9)	98.7 (37.1)	96.3 (35.7)	87.9 (31.1)	79.5 (26.4)	71.1 (21.7)	100.3 (37.9)
Mean daily maximum °F (°C)	36.1 (2.3)	39.8 (4.3)	48.8 (9.3)	61.6 (16.4)	71.9 (22.2)	79.9 (26.6)	83.9 (28.8)	82.3 (27.9)	75.1 (23.9)	63.6 (17.6)	52.3 (11.3)	40.4 (4.7)	61.4 (16.3)
Daily mean °F (°C)	27.0 (−2.8)	29.9 (−1.2)	37.9 (3.3)	49.2 (9.6)	59.3 (15.2)	68.0 (20.0)	72.4 (22.4)	70.9 (21.6)	63.5 (17.5)	51.9 (11.1)	42.3 (5.7)	31.9 (−0.1)	50.4 (10.2)
Mean daily minimum °F (°C)	17.9 (−7.8)	20.1 (−6.6)	27.0 (−2.8)	36.9 (2.7)	46.7 (8.2)	56.1 (13.4)	60.9 (16.1)	59.5 (15.3)	51.9 (11.1)	40.3 (4.6)	32.3 (0.2)	23.4 (−4.8)	39.5 (4.2)
Record low °F (°C)	−18.0 (−27.8)	−8.6 (−22.6)	−0.5 (−18.1)	14.3 (−9.8)	27.1 (−2.7)	36.4 (2.4)	42.6 (5.9)	38.0 (3.3)	29.8 (−1.2)	19.8 (−6.8)	6.1 (−14.4)	−7.1 (−21.7)	−18.0 (−27.8)
Average precipitation inches (mm)	3.40 (86)	2.97 (75)	3.64 (92)	4.11 (104)	4.43 (113)	4.48 (114)	4.52 (115)	4.41 (112)	4.97 (126)	4.77 (121)	4.02 (102)	4.09 (104)	49.81 (1,265)
Average snowfall inches (cm)	11.8 (30)	8.5 (22)	8.8 (22)	2.1 (5.3)	0.0 (0.0)	0.0 (0.0)	0.0 (0.0)	0.0 (0.0)	0.0 (0.0)	0.1 (0.25)	2.2 (5.6)	7.1 (18)	40.6 (103)
Average relative humidity (%)	69.1	64.3	59.6	57.4	61.8	68.9	68.9	71.7	72.8	71.0	69.4	70.5	67.1
Average dew point °F (°C)	18.2 (−7.7)	19.3 (−7.1)	25.1 (−3.8)	34.8 (1.6)	46.2 (7.9)	57.4 (14.1)	61.6 (16.4)	61.3 (16.3)	54.6 (12.6)	42.8 (6.0)	33.0 (0.6)	23.4 (−4.8)	39.9 (4.4)
Source: PRISM

== Temperate rainforest ==
The Pocono Mountains and the Allegheny Mountains in Pennsylvania also is an island of temperate rainforest with some areas averaging just over 55 inches of precipitation annually. A temperate rainforest is defined as a forest that has an average of at least 55 inches of precipitation annually and an average annual temperature between 4 and 12 degrees Celsius (39 and 54 degrees Fahrenheit). Some sources however claim even at least 50 inches of average annual precipitation qualifies an area to be a rainforest. Alaback also adds some additional criteria to the definition of a temperate rainforest as having at least 10% of its average annual precipitation during the summer months, cool and frequently overcast summers with an average July temperature of less than 16 degrees Celsius (60.8 degrees Fahrenheit), and forest fires or wildfires are rare and do not play an important role in the forest ecosystem. It must also be dense and lush with a rich understory and epiphytes.

== Ecology ==
=== Glaciated Low Plateau region ===
According to the A. W. Kuchler U.S. potential natural vegetation types, the Glaciated Low Plateau region of the northern and eastern Poconos would have a dominant vegetation type of Northern Hardwood (106) with a dominant vegetation form of Northern hardwood forest (26) north and west of Lake Wallenpaupack, and a dominant vegetation type of Appalachian Oak (104) with a dominant vegetation form of Eastern Hardwood Forest (25) south and east of Wallenpaupack. The peak spring bloom typically occurs in early May and peak fall color usually occurs in early October. The plant hardiness zone is 5b with an average annual extreme minimum air temperature of −13.1 °F (−25.1 °C).

=== Glaciated Pocono Plateau region ===
According to the A. W. Kuchler U.S. potential natural vegetation types, the Glaciated Pocono Plateau region of the central and western Poconos would have a dominant vegetation type of Northern Hardwood (106) with a dominant vegetation form of Northern hardwood forest (26). The peak spring bloom typically occurs in early May and peak fall color usually occurs in early October. The plant hardiness zone is 5b with an average annual extreme minimum air temperature of −10.1 °F (−23.4 °C).

=== Ridge and Valley region ===
According to the A. W. Kuchler U.S. potential natural vegetation types, the Ridge and Valley region of the southern Poconos would have a dominant vegetation type of Appalachian Oak (104) with a dominant vegetation form of Eastern Hardwood Forest (25). The peak spring bloom typically occurs in late April and peak fall color usually occurs in mid October. The plant hardiness zone is 6a with an average annual extreme minimum air temperature of −5.4 °F (−20.8 °C).

== Sullivan march ==
During the Revolutionary War in 1779, General John Sullivan marched his troops through the Pocono Mountains (Monroe and Luzerne counties) on their expedition to fight the Iroquois tribe in New York State. Sergeant Moses Fellows of the Third New Hampshire Regiment described the area as "...very poor & Barren and I think as never will Be Settled."

== Recreation ==
The Poconos are a well-known outdoor recreation destination for residents around the northeast, especially from New York City and Philadelphia. The region encompasses the Delaware State Forest, including six designated natural areas, seven state parks, and seventeen state game lands. The Delaware Water Gap National Recreation Area is on the eastern edge of the Poconos and includes 70,000 acres (280 km^{2}) of wilderness. The Pocono Mountains are a popular year-round recreational destination, offering a wide range of outdoor activities across all seasons. During the winter months, the region is well known for skiing and snowboarding, with several resorts attracting visitors from nearby metropolitan areas. In the warmer months, the Pocono Mountains provide opportunities for swimming, kayaking, and fishing in its many lakes and rivers. Hiking, camping, and nature exploration are also common activities, supported by the area's extensive forests and state parks. This seasonal variety contributes significantly to the region's tourism and overall appeal.

=== Resorts ===
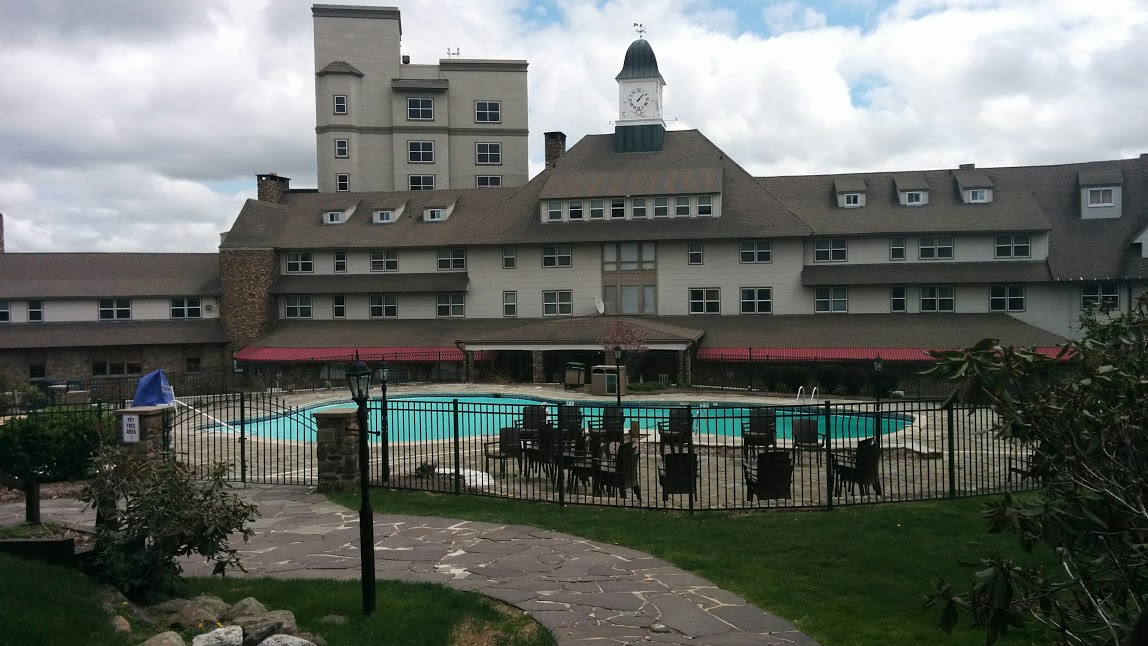
Inn at Pocono Manor in the Pocono Manor Historic District in May 2015

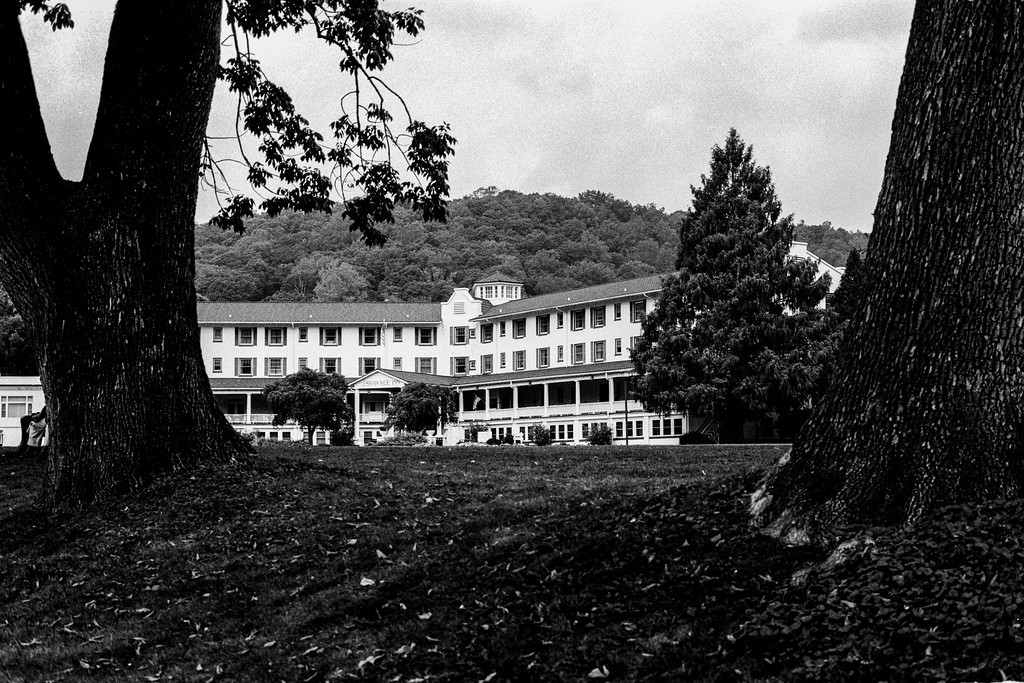
The Shawnee Inn in Smithfield Township in September 2012

Two of the earliest Pocono resorts were founded by rival factions of the Philadelphia Quaker community, Inn at Buck Hill Falls (1901) and Pocono Manor (1902). These resorts did not allow liquor or dancing, and evening dress was discouraged. The Quakers "brought a quiet, unostentatious style to the region," but their hotels later developed from religious retreats into "luxurious mountain resorts." Buck Hill's stone facade became a model for close to 300 stately stone-and-shingle homes in the region.

Pocono Manor offered sweeping vistas of the eastern and western Pocono region and had been referred to as the "Grand Lady of the Mountains". Buck Hill closed in 1990 and the Inn at Pocono Manor was mostly destroyed by fire in 2019.

Skytop Lodge, built in 1928, is described as a "Dutch Colonial–style manor house". Designed in reaction to the Quaker resorts, it had a dance floor and served liquor in a basement bar. Skytop offers 30 miles (48 km) of hiking trails, and the main building "is surrounded by 5,000 acres (20 km^{2}) of wood, glacial bogs, hemlock gorges, beaver marshes, and cascading waterfalls." Novelist Faith Baldwin wrote about her 1932 visit to Skytop, "Here are friendly mountains, round-breasted, smiling in the clear, rosy light of dawn."

The Buckwood Inn opened in 1911 and included the first golf course to be designed by renowned golf architect A. W. Tillinghast. Bandleader Fred Waring purchased the resort in 1943, renamed it the Shawnee Inn, and broadcast his radio shows from there. The Shawnee Inn is a Spanish colonial revival building with white-Moorish architecture and Spanish tiled roofs, and it was identified in the 1990s as the only resort on the banks of the Delaware River.

Tamiment was a popular resort among Jewish singles from the working and emerging middle class and has been described as "a progressive version of the Catskills..." The 2,200 acres (8.9 km^{2}) facility opened in 1921 to generate income for the Rand School of Social Science, a Socialist school in New York. Tamiment Playhouse entertained resort guests with an original revue every Saturday night during the 10-week summer season, and many prominent Broadway and TV figures gained experience there. The playhouse was referred to as the "Poconos boot camp for Broadway writers and performers." The revues were discontinued in 1960 and the resort closed down in 2005.

Unity House, a 655-acre (265 ha) Pocono retreat, offered affordable vacations for factory workers. The resort was owned for seventy years by the International Ladies' Garment Workers' Union, and it served as a staging ground for union activities. Ron Devlin of The Morning Call referred to Unity House as a "blue-collar 'Hilton.'" Eleanor Roosevelt visited Unity House many times and wrote, "...you could not put children in a more favorable environment..." The resort closed down in 1990, falling victim to changing times and declining union membership.

In 1945 retired New York executive Rudolf Van Hoevenberg established the first honeymoon resort in the Pocono Mountains, Farm on the Hill. Sally Moore of Snow Country wrote, "Far from today's sybaritic accommodations, back then the rustic cabins required new brides to make the beds and tidy up while grooms helped with the dishes and did the heavy work."

By 1960, the Pocono Mountains rivaled Niagara Falls as a honeymoon destination, attracting 100,000 couples a year. Morris Wilkins, co-owner of Cove Haven, invented the heart-shaped bathtub in 1963 as a way to lure honeymoon customers.

The tub would appear in other couples' resorts and became a symbol of the Pocono resort business. Author Lawrence Squeri wrote in 2002, "If Americans today are asked to name the image that best represents the Poconos, chances are that many will cite couples resorts and heart-shaped bathtubs..."

Mount Airy Lodge expanded from an eight-room inn into the largest Pocono resort. It is heavily advertised in the New York media market with the catchy jingle, "Beautiful Mount Airy Lodge." Headliners, such as Bob Hope, Milton Berle, and Connie Francis, performed in the Crystal Room, Mount Airy's 2,000-seat theater. Comedian Mickey Freeman said, "The food was lousy, but it was a legalized orgy." The 1,200-acre (490 ha) resort's heyday was in the 1960s and 1970s before closing in 2001.

In the 1950s, the Kiesendahl family purchased a 12-bedroom boarding house along Lake Teedyuskung. It became the Woodloch Resort and, as of 2014, it encompassed 1,000 acres (400 ha) and accommodated 900 guests in a variety of lodgings. Travel + Leisure identified the Lodge at Woodloch (founded in 2006) as the number 3 destination spa in the world.

As of July 2015, there were four Pocono resorts with indoor water parks: Great Wolf Lodge, H20ooohh! at Split Rock Resort, Aquatopia at Camelback Mountain Resort, and Kalahari Resort. In 2014 Jayne Clark of USA Today wrote, "The former Honeymoon Capital of the World, the Poconos – rebranded in 2007 as the Pocono Mountains – continues to fine-tune its image as a family-friendly outdoor adventureland, health spa getaway and emerging waterpark capital."

=== Gambling ===
In November 2006 the Pocono Downs (now Mohegan Pennsylvania) harness-racing complex opened the first slot-machine parlor in the state of Pennsylvania. It was owned by the Mohegan Indian Tribe of Connecticut and included two gambling floors with nearly 1,100 machines. The Mount Airy Casino Resort opened in October 2007 (on the site of the former Mount Airy Lodge) with about 2,500 slot machines. The owner, Louis DeNaples, was later charged with perjury due to suspected ties with organized crime figures. He turned the resort over to his daughter and avoided prosecution.

=== Camping ===
The Poconos are home to several Scout camps. Camp Minsi, owned by the Boy Scouts' Minsi Trails Council, is centrally located in the Poconos on a property of 1,200 acres (490 ha) in Pocono Summit. Camp Mosey Wood, owned by the Girl Scouts Eastern Pennsylvania council, is located on a property of 425 acres (170 ha) in White Haven, Pennsylvania. Other Scout camps located in the Poconos include the Goose Pond Scout Reservation (Lake Ariel), the Resica Falls Scout Reservation (Marshalls Creek), and the Trexler Scout Reservation (Jonas).

The Poconos are also home to several Jewish summer camps, including Camp Massad, Camp Ramah, and Pinemere Camp. Other non-denominational season summer camps include Camp Lohikan, Camp Watonka, and Pocono Springs Camp.

=== Racing ===
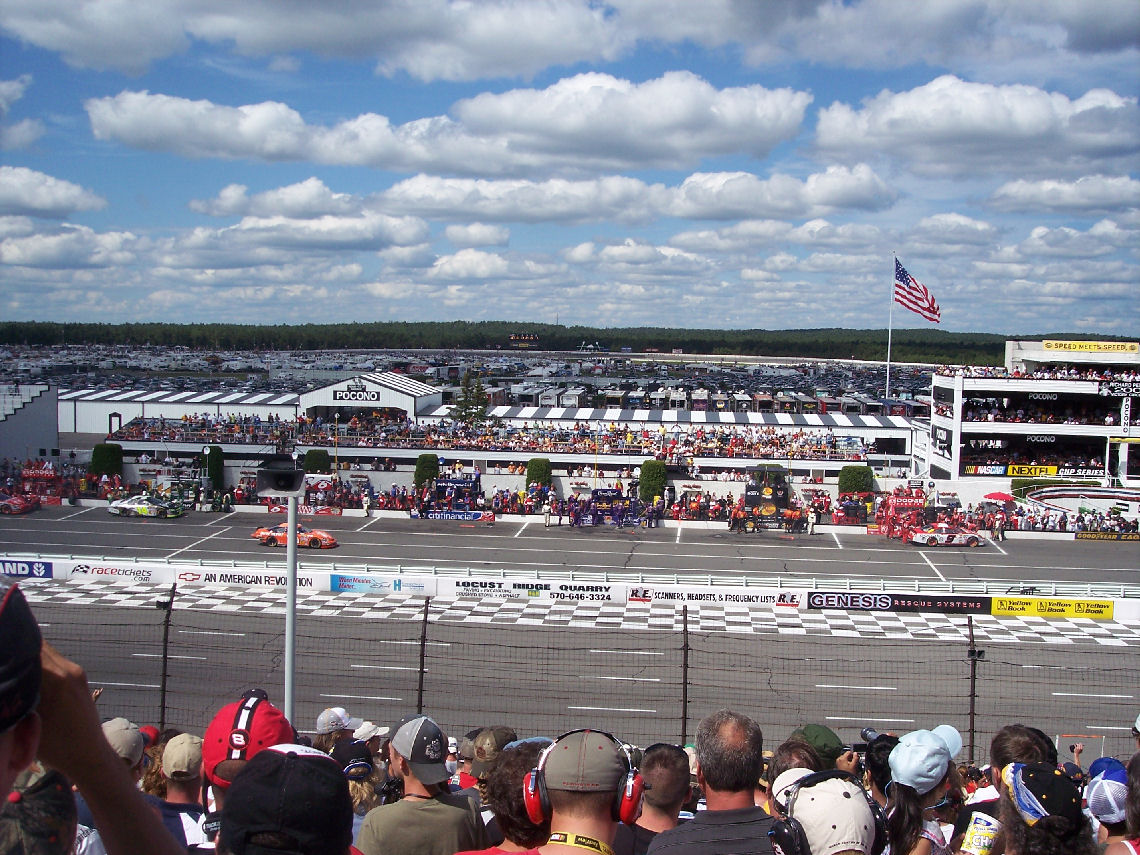
Pocono Raceway in Long Pond

Pocono Raceway, a major automobile race track, is home to a NASCAR Cup Series race, the Pocono 400, in July. The track formerly hosted a second NASCAR Cup Series race, the Pocono 325, and an IndyCar race, the Pocono 500. It also serves as a racing school, motorcycle track, and hosts club events. The two NASCAR weekends at Pocono are vital to the region for the tourism money it brings to the local economy. Pocono Raceway is the closest major professional race track to Philadelphia and the major metropolitan areas of New York and New Jersey.

=== Skiing ===
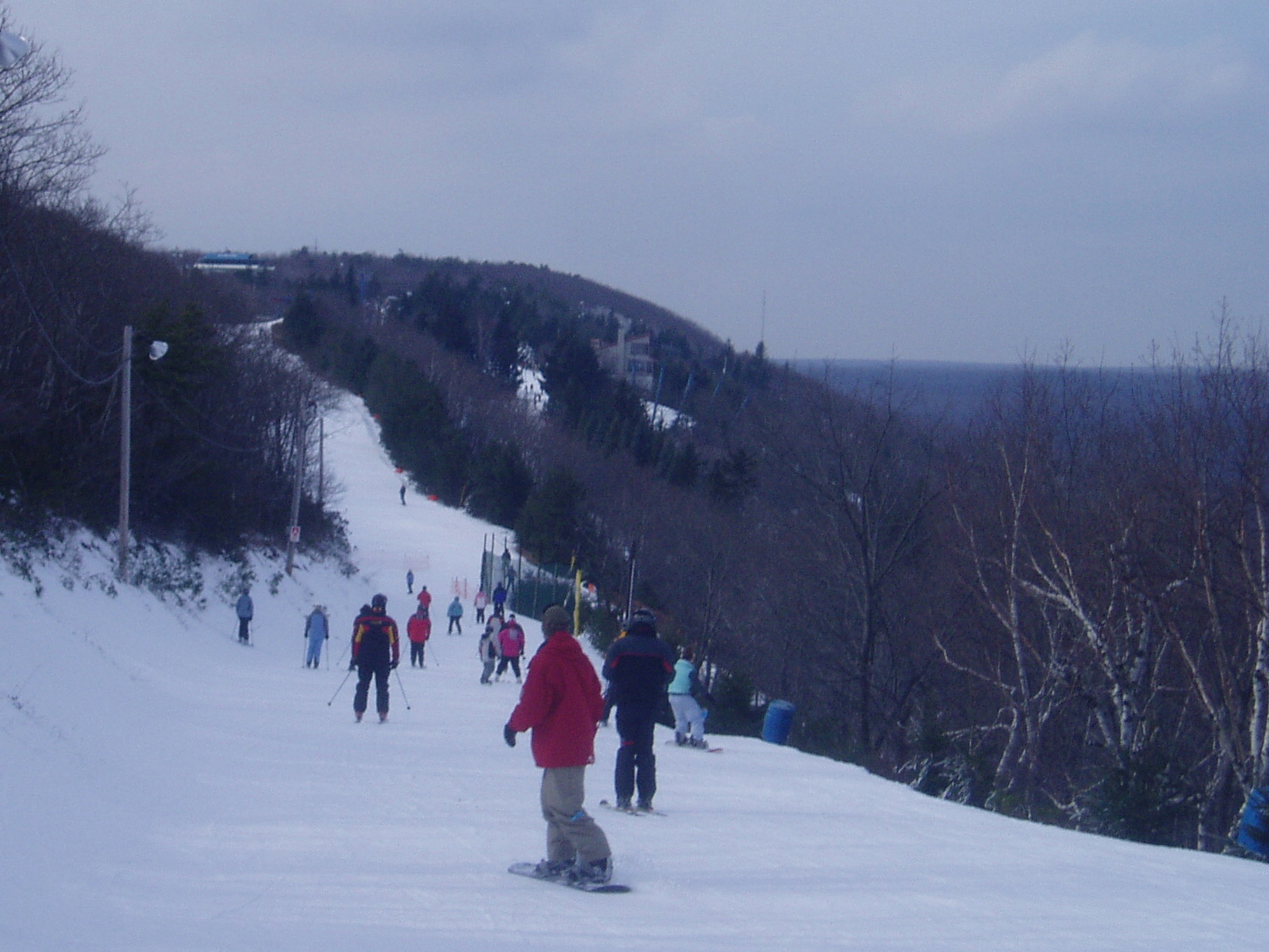
Camelback Mountain Resort in Tannersville

Skiing was a $230 million per year industry in the Poconos and in 1987 accounted for one-quarter of the region's tourist business. Pennsylvania native John Guresh, a Big Boulder Ski Resort employee, is credited for bringing the ski industry to the Poconos. In the winter of 1956–57, he invented a machine "resembling a lawn sprinkler atop a sled" to generate artificial snow. Joyce Gemperlein of The Philadelphia Inquirer wrote, "Until Guresh perfected snowmaking at Big Boulder, skiing in the Poconos was a relatively minor sport." Ski resorts in the region could not rely on natural snow and, according to Big Boulder manager Ken Knize, there were times when conditions were right for skiing only two weeks a year. Cal Conniff, president of the National Ski Areas Association, regarded Guresh as "one of the pioneers" of the U.S. ski industry.

- Alpine Mountain - now closed.
- Blue Mountain Resort — is one of the most popular ski resorts in Pennsylvania with 39 trails, 13 lifts and 1,082 feet (330 m) of elevation gain.
- Camelback Mountain Resort — The second-highest number of ski runs in the Poconos and one of the more popular ski areas and peaks over 2,133 feet (650 m).
- Jack Frost Mountain and Big Boulder — Both resorts are owned by the same parent company. Jack Frost caters to more traditional family skiing, while Big Boulder is largely focused on terrain park skiing and snowboarding.
- Montage Mountain Ski Resort — formerly known as "Snö Mountain".
- Shawnee Mountain Ski Area — closest to New York City, just across the Delaware River from New Jersey, suited for families and beginners.
- Ski Big Bear

== Notable natives and residents ==
- Jessica Delfino, comedian and writer
- Jake Ewald, musician
- Fethullah Gülen, Turkish cleric in self-imposed exile
- Robert E. Kintner, ex-President of both ABC and NBC
- S. S. Kresge, founder of Kmart, formerly, SS Kresge's
- Byron Lichtenberg, American engineer and fighter pilot who flew aboard two NASA Space Shuttle missions as a Payload Specialist.
- Kelly Monaco, actress and winner of the first season of Dancing with the Stars
- Rob Felicetti, bassist in alternative rock/pop punk band Bowling For Soup.
- James Mungro, former NFL running back and Super Bowl Champion with the Indianapolis Colts
- Paul Sorvino, actor and opera singer.
- Morris Wilkins, inventor of the heart-shaped bathtub and champagne glass bathtub
- Theophilus London, rapper, singer, and record producer

== Media ==
=== Print ===
The Pocono Record is the newspaper for the Poconos. Its coverage area centers on Stroudsburg and East Stroudsburg and covers parts of Monroe, Pike, Lackawanna, Luzerne, Wayne and Carbon counties as well as areas of western New Jersey.

The Times News, of Lehighton, covers Carbon, Schuylkill, and Monroe counties, and also portions of northern Lehigh and Northampton counties.

West End Happenings covers events in the West End of Monroe County.

The Morning Call, of Allentown, is distributed to a sizeable portion of the region, especially southern Carbon, southern Monroe, and southeastern Schuylkill counties, though its coverage is mostly centered on the neighboring Lehigh Valley. A similar situation occurs with the Times-Tribune of the Scranton/Wilkes-Barre area and northern Monroe, northern Carbon, and Luzerne counties.

The Standard-Speaker, of Hazleton, covers parts of Luzerne, Carbon, Monroe, and Schuylkill counties.

Blue Mountain Moments is a monthly publication covering the Route 903 corridor from Blakeslee to Jim Thorpe.

=== Radio ===
- WESS at (90.3 FM) broadcasts from the Borough of East Stroudsburg as a service of East Stroudsburg University. Students and faculty of the university provide programing often, and the station rebroadcasts BBC World Service when live DJs are not available.
- WKRZ (98.5 FM/107.9 FM) is a radio station broadcasting a contemporary hits radio format. The station's call letters are WKRF-FM and is licensed to Tobyhanna and simulcasts WKRZ-FM (98.5 FM from Wilkes Barre) on 107.9 FM.
- WPCO (840 AM; "Poco 103.1") is licensed to Stroudsburg. The station's slogan is "The Poconos' Greatest Hits"; they primarily play music from the 1960s to the 1990s.
- WVPO "Bigfoot Country 96.7" is licensed to Lehman Township in Pike County. The station plays country music.
- WSBG (93.5 FM) is a radio station broadcasting an adult contemporary format. Licensed to Stroudsburg, the station serves the Pocono area with the slogan "The Poconos' Best Variety".

== See also ==
- List of subranges of the Appalachian Mountains
