= Pocono Summit, Pennsylvania =

Unincorporated community in Pennsylvania, US

- Census-designated place
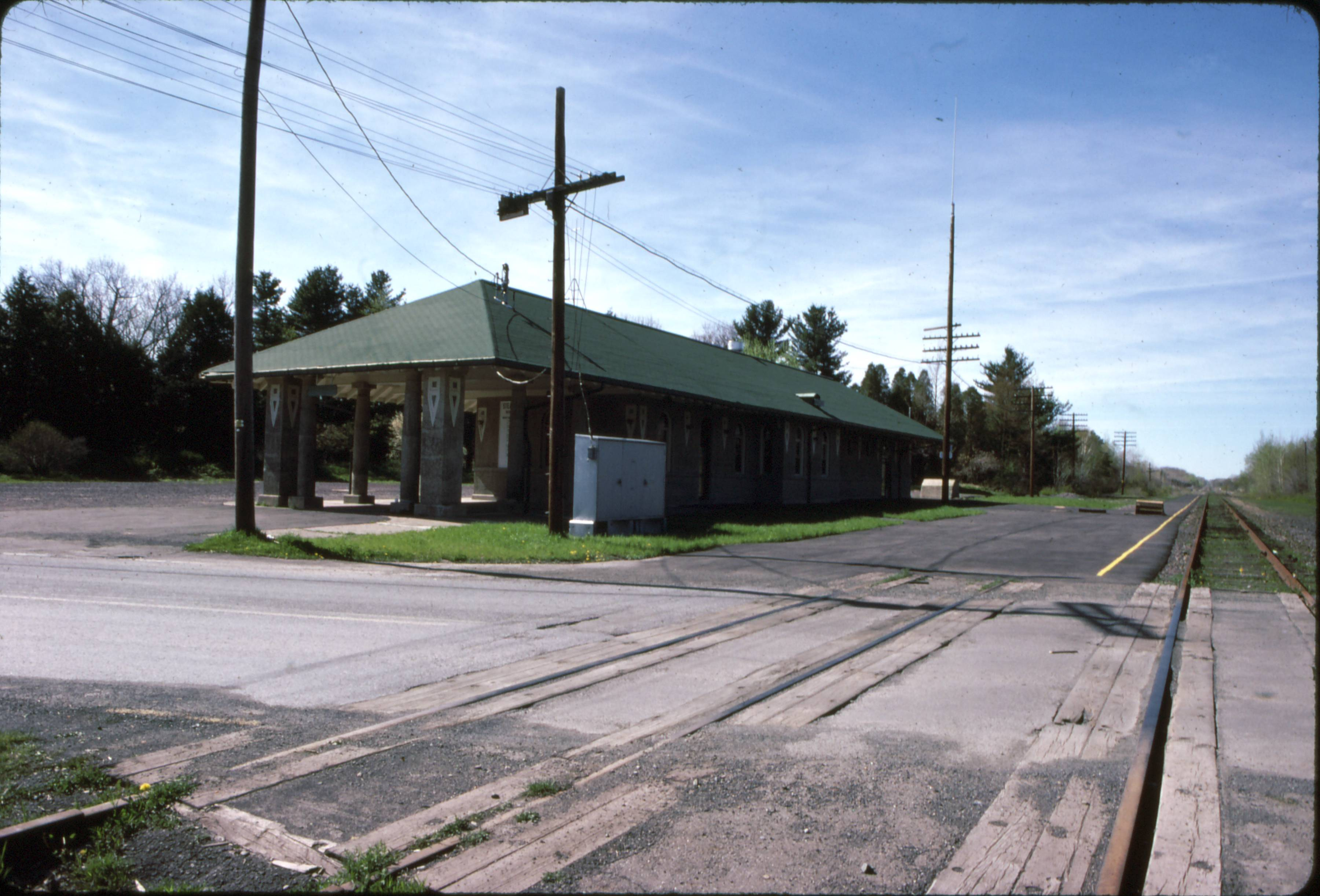
- Pocono Summit Railroad Station
- Interactive map of Pocono Summit, Pennsylvania
- Coordinates: 41°06′39″N 75°23′09″W
- Country: United States
- State: Pennsylvania
- County: Monroe
- Townships: Coolbaugh, Tobyhanna

Area
  - Total: 16.1 sq mi (42 km^{2})
  - Land: 15.4 sq mi (40 km^{2})
  - Water: .7 sq mi (1.8 km^{2})
- Elevation: 1,804 ft (550 m)

Population (2010)
  - Total: 2,964
  - Density: 192/sq mi (74.3/km^{2})
- Time zone: UTC-5 (EST)
  - Summer (DST): UTC-4 (EDT)
- ZIP code: 18346
- Area code(s): 570 and 272

Pocono Summit is an unincorporated community and census-designated place in Monroe County, Pennsylvania. Parts of Pocono Summit are located in the municipalities of the Coolbaugh and Tobyhanna townships.

== Geography ==
Pocono Summit is located at 41°6′39″N 75°23′09″W (41.111, –75.386). According to the U.S. Census Bureau, Pocono Summit has a total area of 16.1 square miles (41.7 km^{2}), 95% of it land.

Pocono Summit is home to Stillwater Lake and Pocono Summit Lake.

== Demographics ==
Historical population
| Census | Pop. | Note | %± |
|---|---|---|---|
| 2000 | 2,131 | | — |
| 2010 | 2,964 | | 39.1% |

As of the census of 2010, 2,964 people were living in the area.

== Education ==
The Pocono Mountain School District's Sullivan Trail campus is located in Pocono Summit; the campus includes Pocono Mountain West High School and Pocono Mountain West Junior High School.

== Recreation ==
Pocono Summit is home to Camp Minsi, a Boy Scout camp located on the western shores of Stillwater Lake. The camp was first opened in 1949 and encompasses more than 1,200 acres (490 ha).

The area also includes portions of Pennsylvania State Game Lands 127.

== Transportation ==
Pennsylvania Route 940 passes over Pennsylvania Route 314 in Pocono Summit. Interstate 380 runs north-south along the edge of the town.

Until the early 1960s, the Lackawanna Railroad's and then the Erie Lackawanna Railroad's Lake Cities, Phoebe Snow and Twilight made stops westbound at the Pocono Summit station; the Phoebe Snow and the Pocono Express made stops eastbound at the station. In the latter years of Erie Lackawanna passenger train through the Poconos, Pocono Summit was the last remaining station, between Scranton to the northwest and Cresco to the east, to have service, offering a stop on the Lake Cities westbound.
