= Pennsylvania Route 191 =

State highway in Pennsylvania, US

Pennsylvania Route 191

Route information
- Maintained by PennDOT and JIBC
- Length: 111.54 mi (179.51 km)
- Existed: April 17, 1961–present

Major junctions
- South end: US 22 in Brodhead
- PA 248 in Nazareth; PA 33 in Stockertown; PA 611 in Stroudsburg; I-80 / US 209 in Stroudsburg; US 209 Bus. in Stroudsburg; PA 447 in Arlington Heights; PA 940 in Paradise Valley; PA 390 in Paradise Township; PA 507 in Dreher Township; I-84 in Sterling Township; US 6 in Honesdale
- North end: South Pennsylvania Avenue in Hancock, NY

Location
- Country: United States
- State: Pennsylvania
- Counties: Northampton, Monroe, Pike, Wayne

Highway system
- Pennsylvania State Route System; Interstate; US; State; Scenic; Legislative
← PA 190	→ PA 192
← I-90	PA 90	→ PA 91

Pennsylvania Route 191 (PA 191) is a 111.54 mi (179.51 km)-long state highway in the U.S. state of Pennsylvania. The route, a major non-freeway corridor connecting the Lehigh Valley to the Pocono Mountains in eastern Pennsylvania, is designated from U.S. Route 22 (US 22) in Brodhead near Bethlehem to the New York state line over the Delaware River at Hancock, New York.

Commissioned on April 17, 1961, the route replaced the PA 12 and PA 90 numbers that were in place from the late 1920s to the 1960s. From 1961 to 1976, PA 191 was routed south of US 22 through Bethlehem and terminated at PA 309 in Center Valley. PA 378 replaced the designation from Center Valley to the Lehigh River crossing in Bethlehem.

== Route description ==
=== Northampton County ===
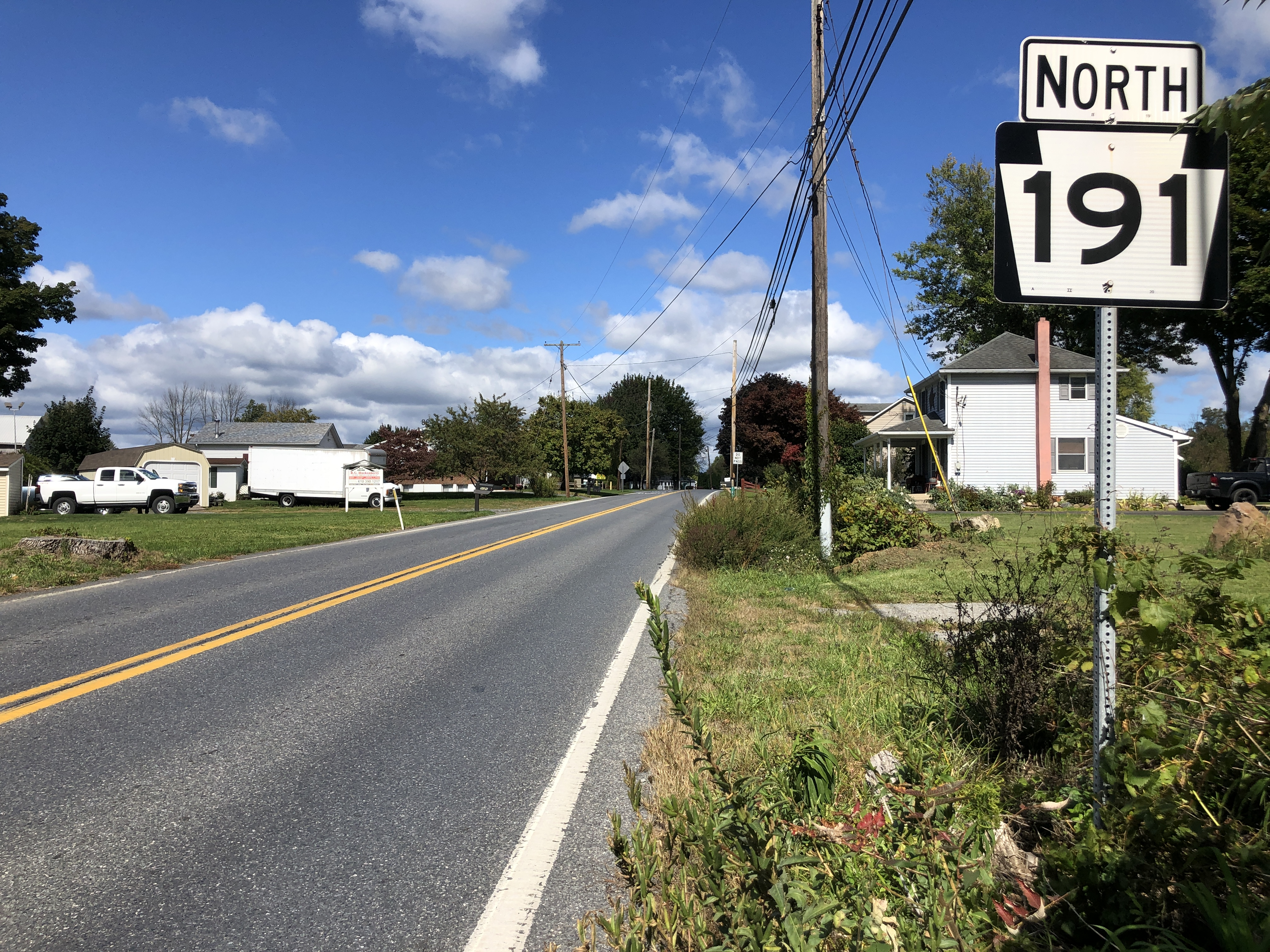
PA 191 northbound in Plainfield Township

PA 191 begins along Nazareth Pike at an interchange with the US 22 freeway in Bethlehem Township, Northampton County in the Lehigh Valley. South of US 22, Nazareth Pike continues as State Route 3015, an unsigned quadrant route, to Bethlehem, where it becomes Linden Street. From the interchange, PA 191 heads north-northeast along two-lane undivided Nazareth Pike and runs through Brodhead, passing businesses a short distance to the east of Monocacy Creek. The road crosses into Lower Nazareth Township and crosses the creek twice as it passes more commercial development with some woods and homes, passing through Hecktown. In Newburg, the route intersects the eastern terminus of PA 946 and heads through farmland with some residences. PA 191 passes to the east of the former Nazareth Speedway and heads past businesses before reaching an intersection with PA 248 on the southern border of the borough of Nazareth. At this point, PA 191 turns east for a concurrency with PA 248 on Easton Road, forming the border between Nazareth to the north and Lower Nazareth Township to the south before fully entering Nazareth.

PA 191 splits from PA 248 by turning north onto South Broad Street and crossing Norfolk Southern's Cement Secondary before continuing into residential areas. The route heads into the downtown area of Nazareth, where it turns east onto East Center Street. PA 191 heads past more homes, turning north onto North New Street. The road leaves Nazareth for Upper Nazareth Township and curves to the east-northeast as East Lawn Road, passing residences and businesses in Eastlawn Gardens. The route heads into industrial areas and passes north of a quarry, crossing a Norfolk Southern railroad spur. PA 191 widens into a four-lane divided highway and passes through a corner of Palmer Township before crossing the Bushkill Creek into Stockertown as Industrial Boulevard, crossing a Norfolk Southern railroad spur and passing near more commercial development and industry before reaching an interchange with the PA 33 freeway.

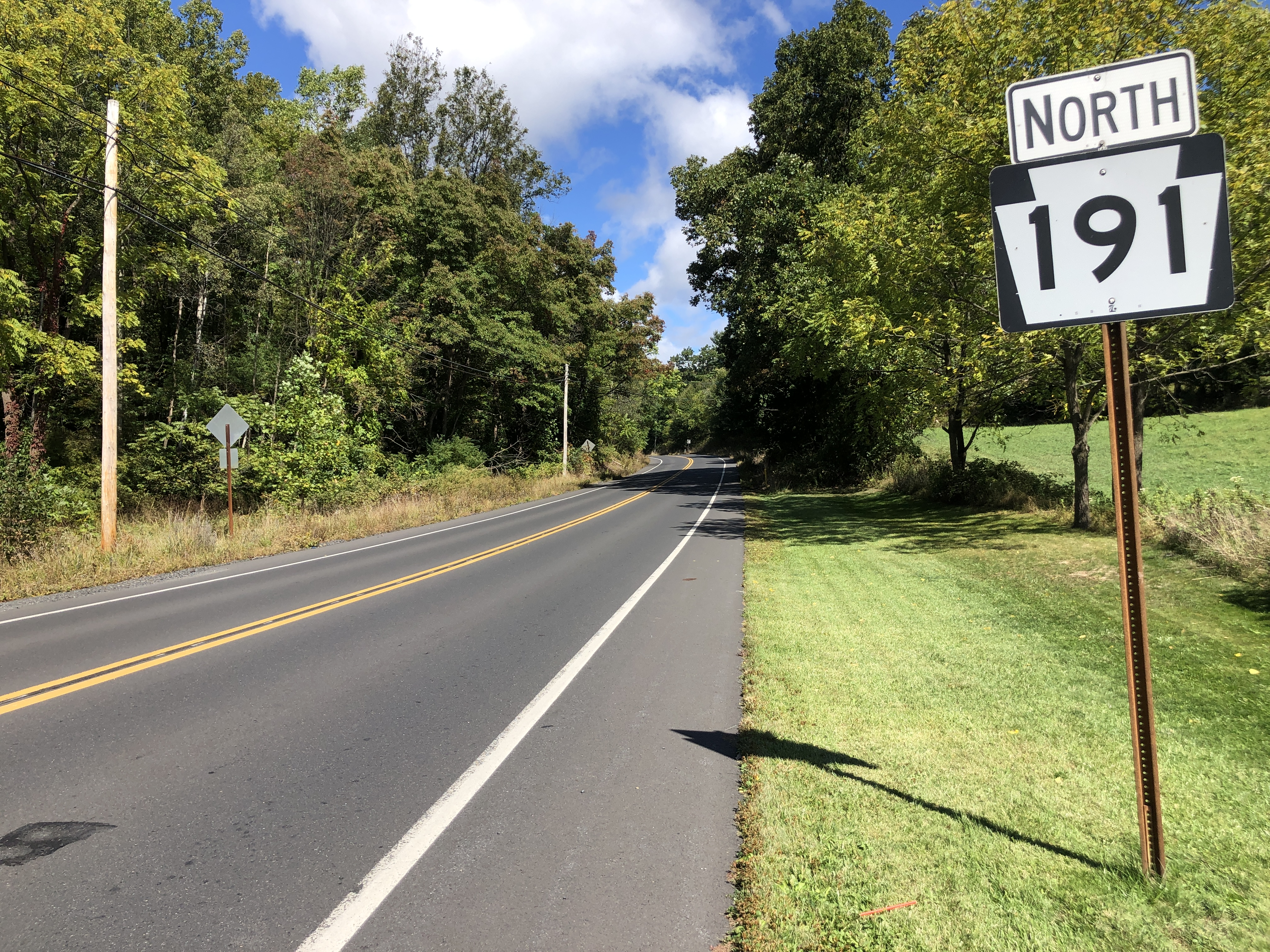
PA 191 northbound in Washington Township

Past this interchange, the route heads northeast past more commercial development as a four-lane undivided road before crossing the Stockertown Rails-to-Trails into residential areas. PA 191 turns northwest onto two-lane undivided Main Street and is lined with homes. The route leaves Stockertown for Plainfield Township, intersecting the Stockertown Rails-to-Trails and the Plainfield Township Trail paths, and turns north-northeast onto Bangor Road at the Sullivan Trail intersection. The road passes near homes and commercial development with some farm fields before it comes to Edelman, where it crosses over the Little Bushkill Creek and the Plainfield Township Trail. PA 191 curves northeast and heads through rolling farmland with some woodland and residences. The route turns east before it enters Washington Township and curves back to the northeast, continuing through more rural areas with some development as Washington Boulevard. The road reaches Ackermanville, where it turns east, passing homes.

PA 191 turns to the north and continues through wooded residential areas. The route turns northeast before curving north and entering the borough of Bangor, where it comes South 1st Street and is lined with homes and some businesses. PA 191 heads into the downtown area of Bangor and comes to an intersection with PA 512, where the name changes to North 1st Street. From here, the road continues through developed areas, curving to the north-northwest. The route runs through woodland and enters the borough of Roseto, where it becomes Roseto Avenue and heads north, lined with homes and a few businesses. PA 191 leaves Roseto for Washington Township and heads north-northeast through woods before curving north and crossing into Upper Mount Bethel Township, where the name becomes Valley View Drive. The road heads through woodland with some development before heading northeast through sections of the Cherry Valley National Wildlife Refuge to ascend forested Blue Mountain.

=== Monroe and Pike counties ===
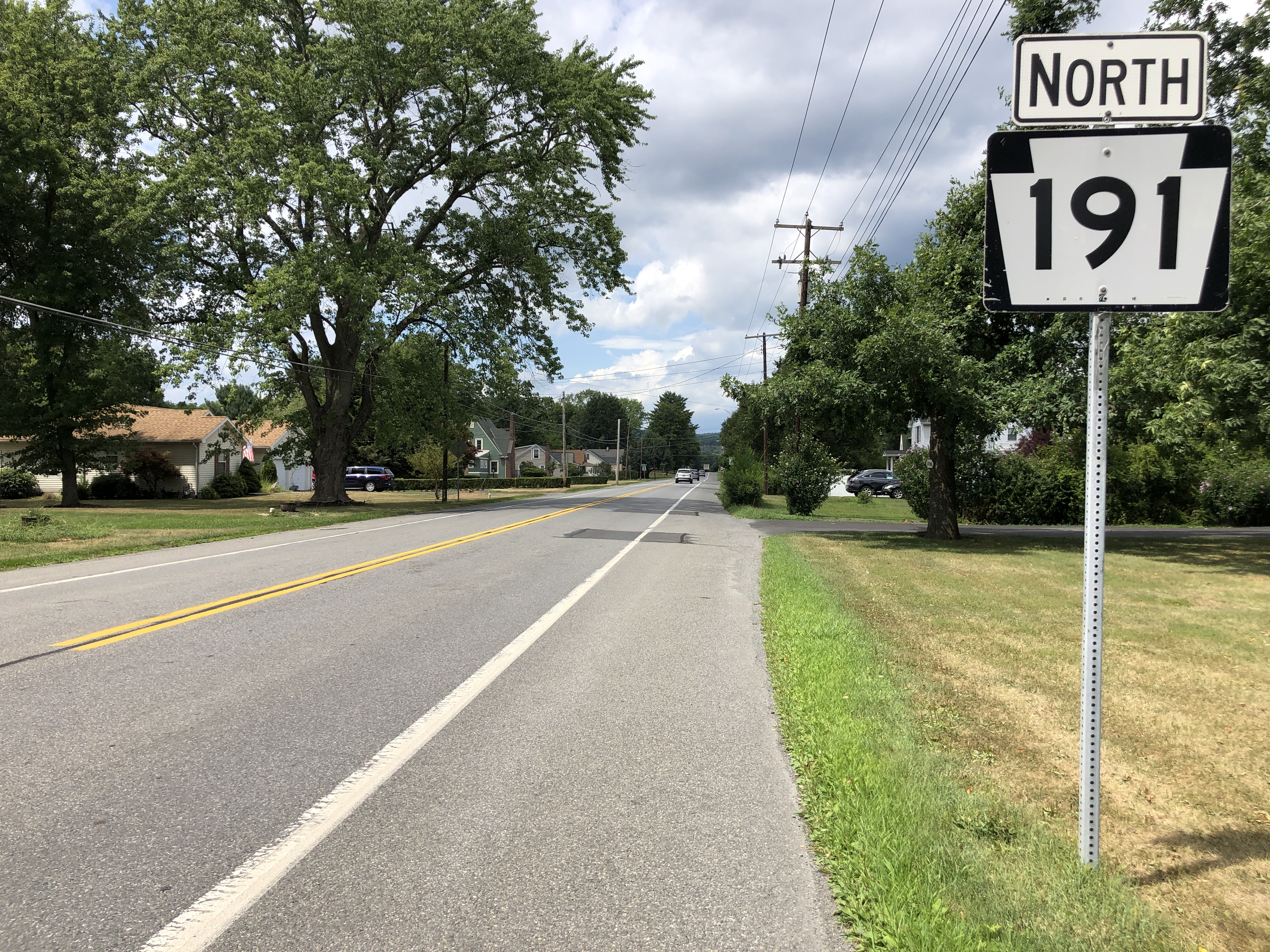
PA 191 northbound in Stroud Township

Upon reaching the summit of Blue Mountain, PA 191 enters Stroud Township in Monroe County and heads into the Pocono Mountains region of Pennsylvania. The road becomes Godfrey Ridge Road and crosses the Appalachian Trail before it makes a hairpin turn to the west to begin descending the mountain. The route turns north and winds through forested areas at the base of the mountain. PA 191 heads north along a winding path through more wooded areas with some fields and homes before it enters the borough of Stroudsburg and comes to an intersection with PA 611. Past this intersection, the route continues north along Broad Street through residential areas, coming to a partial interchange with I-80/US 209 with access to and from the westbound lanes of I-80/US 209; access to and from the eastbound lanes is provided by PA 611. Following this interchange, the road crosses McMichael Creek and reaches an intersection with US 209 Bus. in the downtown area of Stroudsburg, with PA 191 briefly splitting into a one-way pair, with the northbound direction following northbound US 209 Bus. on Main Street, North 4th Street, and southbound US 209 Bus. on McConnell Street, while the southbound direction follows South 5th Street.

After intersecting US 209 Bus., PA 191 continues north along North 5th Street, winding through residential areas. The road turns northwest and leaves Stroudsburg for Stroud Township, passing businesses before running past homes. The road curves north and runs through wooded areas with some development, with the Brodhead Creek Trail and the Brodhead Creek becoming parallel to the east of the road. The route turns northwest alongside the trail and the creek before it curves northeast and comes to a bridge over the Brodhead Creek and a Delaware-Lackawanna Railroad line, coming to an intersection with PA 447. At this point, PA 191 becomes concurrent with PA 447 and the two routes head northwest on Paradise Trail, running through forests with some development, with the creek and railroad tracks parallel to the west. The road heads through mountainous areas and reaches Analomink, turning east before curving north as an unnamed road. The roadway continues through forests to the east of the Brodhead Creek, with PA 447 splitting to the north.

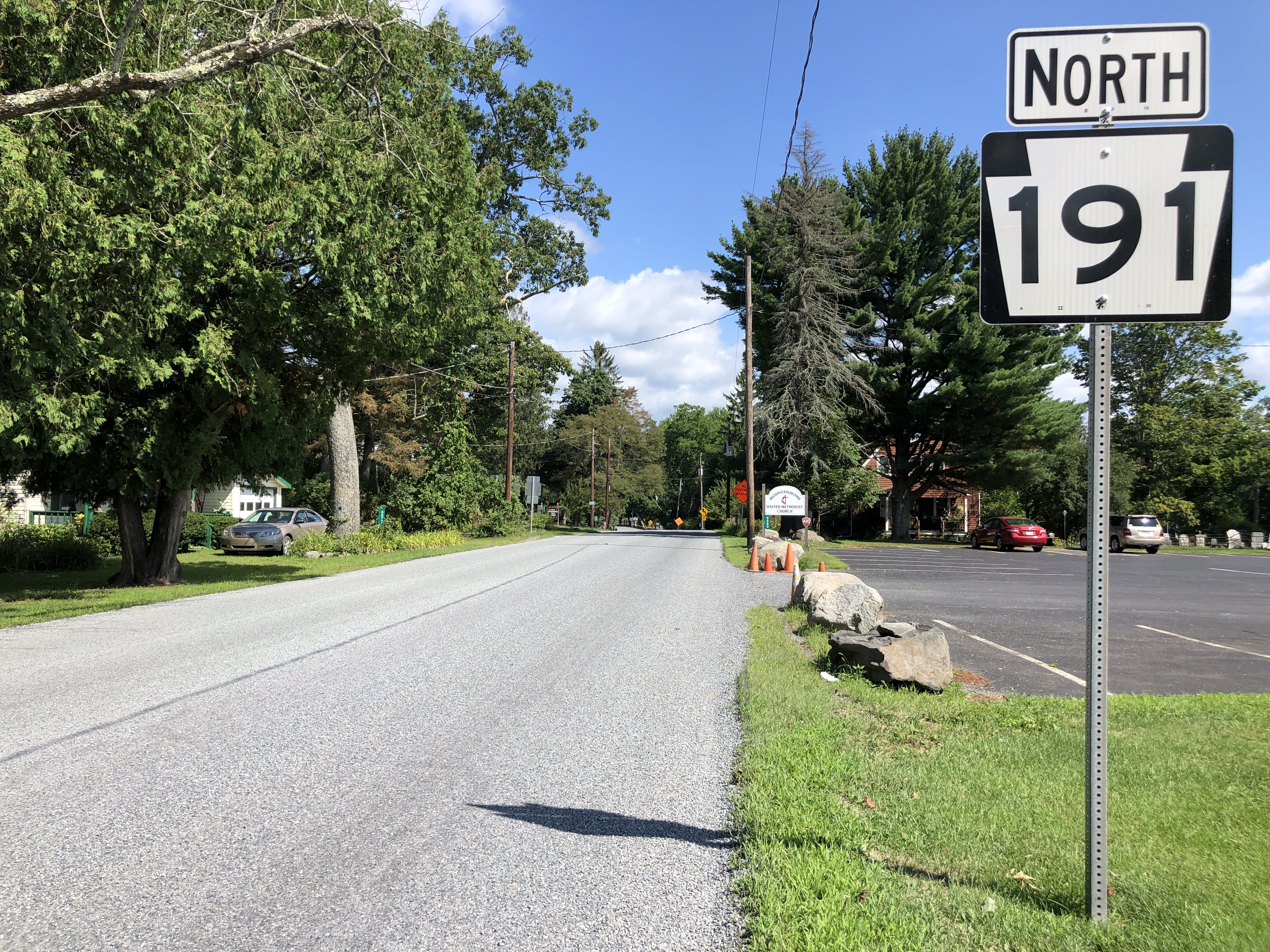
PA 191 northbound past PA 390 in Barrett Township

From here, PA 191 crosses Brodhead Creek and heads northwest through forested areas to the northeast of the parallel Paradise Creek. The road passes under the Delaware-Lackawanna Railroad line and enters Pocono Township, curving north and running between the creek and the railroad tracks. The route heads into Paradise Township and continues through mountainous areas. PA 191 crosses the Paradise Creek and comes to an intersection with the northern terminus of PA 715 in Henryville. The road crosses the creek again in Parkside and continues northwest through forests with some homes. In Paradise Valley, PA 191 reaches a junction with the eastern terminus of PA 940 and turns northeast. The route runs through more woodland and turns northwest, passing near a forested residential development and reaching an intersection with PA 390.

PA 390 then heads north concurrent with PA 191, running through more dense forests with some development and crossing into Barrett Township. The road turns north-northeast and passes over a Delaware-Lackawanna Railroad line before heading through Cresco. The two routes continue into Mountainhome, where PA 390 splits to the northeast and PA 191 continues north. The route passes wooded areas of residences before turning northwest and winding through dense forests. The road turns north and west before it crosses into Coolbaugh Township, where it heads northwest before a turn to the north. PA 191 enters Greene Township in Pike County and becomes La Anna Road, heading north-northeast through more forests before curving to the northwest and passing through La Anna.

=== Wayne County ===
PA 191 crosses the Wallenpaupack Creek into Dreher Township in Wayne County and heads into the upper regions of the Pocono Mountains, becoming South Sterling Road and soon reaching an intersection with the northern terminus of PA 423. From here, the road turns north into forested areas to the west of the Wallenpaupack Creek, turning east and then north as it passes through South Sterling. The route continues north and passes through Haags Mill, coming to a junction with PA 507. Here, PA 507 turns north to form a concurrency with PA 191, heading north on Main Street through wooded areas with some fields and homes to the west of creek. The road curves to the north-northeast and intersects the northern terminus of PA 447 in Newfoundland. The two routes pass through rural residential and commercial development before PA 507 splits to the northeast and PA 191 heads northwest along East Sterling Road. The road passes through more dense forests, heading through East Sterling. The route heads into Sterling Township and becomes Twin Rocks Road, continuing through rural areas and coming to an interchange with I-84. Following this interchange, PA 191 heads northwest through woodland with some commercial development before coming to an intersection with PA 196. At this point, PA 196 heads north for a concurrency with PA 191 on Easton Turnpike, continuing through rural areas and crossing the West Branch Wallenpaupack Creek into Salem Township. The road passes through a mix of farmland and woodland with some homes, coming to an intersection with PA 590 in Hamlin.

North of here, the two routes run through more farms and woods before PA 196 splits to the north and PA 191 continues northeast on Lake Ariel Highway. The road enters Lake Township and heads through wooded areas with some fields and homes, reaching Lake Ariel. Here, the route passes west of Lake Ariel before it heads through residential areas and intersects the southern terminus of PA 296, turning to the east. PA 191 curves to the northeast and runs through forests with some farm fields and homes, continuing into Cherry Ridge Township. The road continues through rural land, passing through Hoadleys. Farther northeast, the route crosses into Texas Township, where it makes a turn to the north.

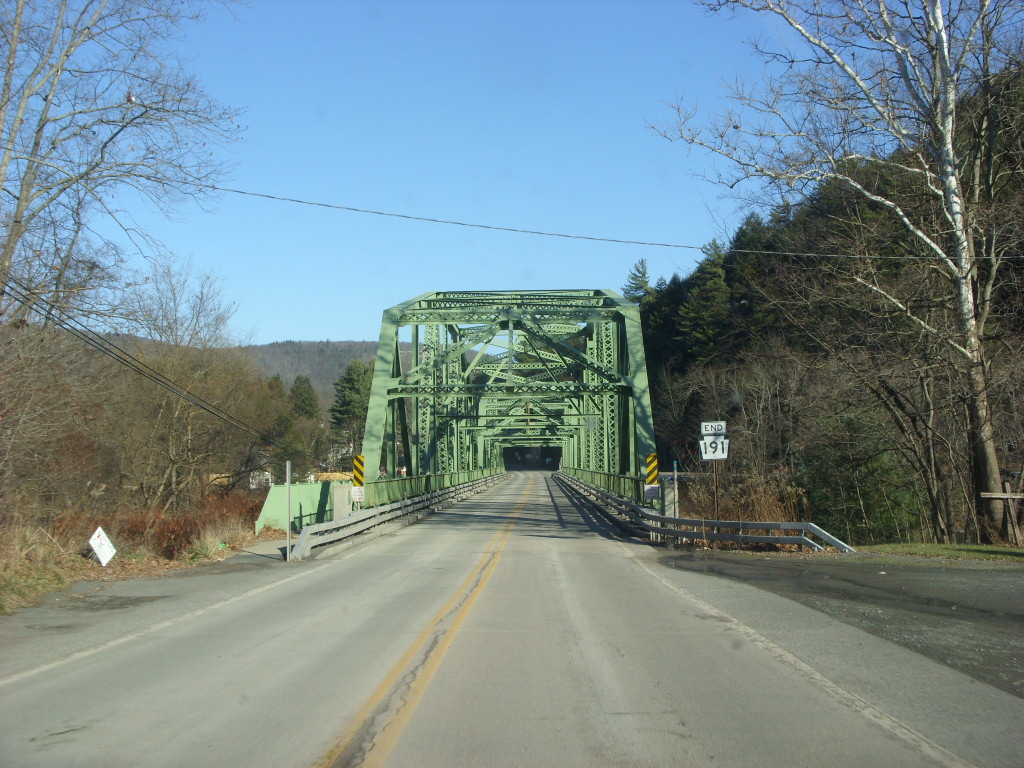
PA 191 at its northern terminus on the bridge to Hancock, New York, in Wayne County

PA 191 enters the borough of Honesdale and becomes Sunrise Avenue, passing a mix of residential and commercial development with some woodland. The route continues northwest onto Erie Street and runs past more development before it turns northeast onto 4th Street, crossing the Stourbridge Railroad and coming to an intersection with US 6. At this point, PA 191 becomes concurrent with US 6 and the route heads north on a one-way pair, with the northbound direction following westbound US 6 along Church Street and the southbound direction following eastbound US 6 along Main Street. The one-way pair, which carries two lanes in each direction, passes through the commercial downtown of Honesdale before passing through residential areas. After crossing the Lackawaxen River, US 6 splits to the west and both directions of PA 191 continue north on two-lane undivided Main Street, passing more homes. The road intersects the southern terminus of PA 670 and crosses Dyberry Creek, becoming Fair Avenue and passing residences and businesses to the east of the creek. The route leaves Honesdale for Dyberry Township and becomes Hancock Highway, passing east of the Wayne County Fairgrounds before running through forested areas. PA 191 winds north through rural land and passes through Dyberry before bending north-northeast and crossing into Oregon Township. The road continues through forests with some farm fields, passing through Siko before entering Lebanon Township. The route runs through more rural land and curves northeast, crossing PA 371 in Rileyville.

PA 191 continues through forests with occasional farmland and homes and crosses into Damascus Township, where it makes a curve to the north and passes through Hilltown. The road enters Manchester Township and passes through Lookout before a curve to the north-northwest, heading through Priceville. The route continues through rural areas, turning west and then north. PA 191 heads north through dense forests and reaches Equinunk, where it turns northwest and crosses the Equinunk Creek into Buckingham Township. At this point, the Delaware River begins to follow the road to the northeast as it continues northwest through forests. The route and the river curve to the west and then to the north, with the route passing through Dillontown. PA 191 continues to wind north along the west bank of the Delaware River through forests, passing through Stockport. Farther north, the road turns northwest and reaches an intersection with the eastern terminus of PA 370. Following this, PA 191 curves northeast near homes and businesses and comes to its northern terminus at the New York border on the Hancock Bridge over the West Branch Delaware River, where the road continues as South Pennsylvania Avenue into the village of Hancock and provides access to NY 97.

== History ==
Pennsylvania Route 12
- Location: Center Valley–Bartonsville
- Existed: 1930s–1961

Pennsylvania Route 90
- Location: Easton–Hancock, New York
- Existed: 1928–1961

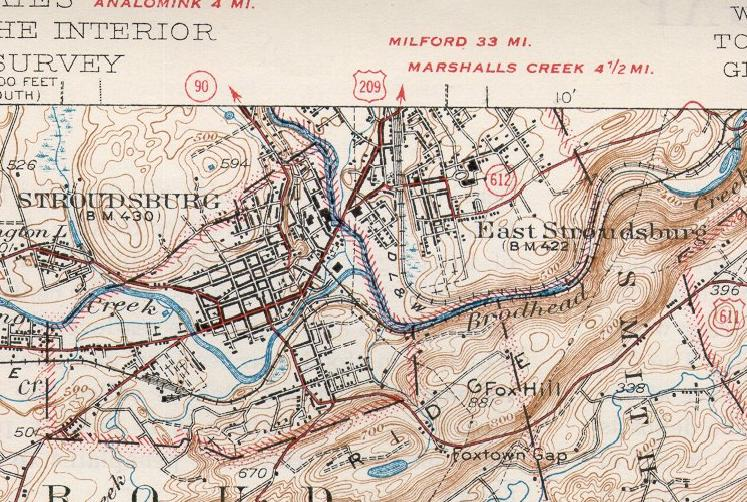
1942 map of Stroudsburg showing PA 191 as PA 90

In the 1920s and 1930s, the first PA 191 number was designated from US 1 (Baltimore Pike) in Clifton Heights to Penrose Avenue in southwest Philadelphia. The first state highway numbers to be assigned on the modern PA 191 were Pennsylvania Route 12 and Pennsylvania Route 90. The earliest alignment of PA 12 had nothing to do with what it would later become; it was originally designated onto the Baltimore Pike, which is now mostly US 1. In 1927, this highway was extended north to the New York line. From Philadelphia to Bethlehem, the highway followed modern-day PA 309 and PA 378. It then reached Stockertown via PA 191, and hit Saylorsburg via the Sullivan Trail. It then took Hamilton S to Sciota, then US 209 BUS and US 209 to the New York line at Milford. That year, PA 90 was designated from Stroudsburg to the New York-Pennsylvania border. From the 1920s to the 1940s, the designation between Stockertown and Stroudsburg had no signed traffic route.

In 1928, several spurs were commissioned. For PA 90, the following spurs were assigned in the Pocono Mountains region: PA 190, PA 290, PA 390, PA 490, PA 590, and PA 690. In 1928, For PA 12, the following spurs were assigned in the Poconos and Lehigh Valley regions: PA 212, PA 312, PA 412, PA 512, PA 612, and PA 712. Later that year, concurrencies with national highways were removed, truncating PA 12 to terminate at Center Valley and Saylorsburg; Hamilton S was apparently not retained as a state highway.

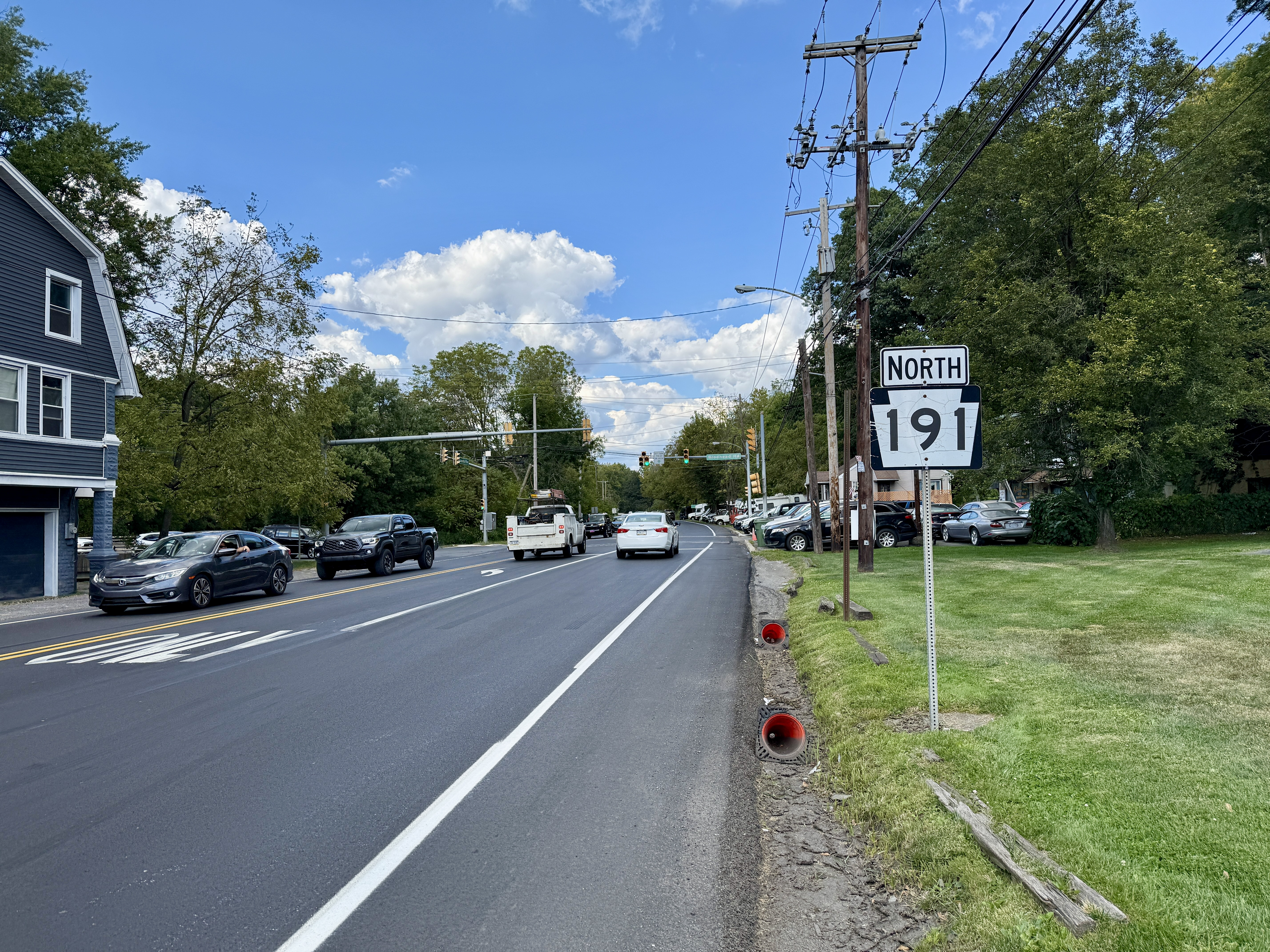
PA 191 northbound past US 22 in Bethlehem Township

In April 1935, PA 12 was extended north to US 611 in Bartonsville, filling a gap between Snydersville and Bartonsville. By 1950, PA 90 was extended south to Easton, including the highway between Stroudsburg and Stockertown. On April 17, 1961, PA 191 was commissioned from the New York state line to US 309 in Center Valley. The route replaced PA 12 south of Stockertown (the rest would be superseded by the PA 33 freeway) and PA 90 north of Stockertown (the rest remained part of PA 115 until 1972). In Bethlehem, PA 191 was designated onto Wyandotte Street, crossed the Lehigh River, went onto Main Street, turned onto Elizabeth Avenue, and turned onto Linden Street or Nazareth-Bethlehem Pike north of Bethlehem. PA 191 was designated to replace PA 12 and PA 90 in order to provide a continuous route between Center Valley and the New York border as well as to reduce confusion with I-90 in the northwest part of the state.

By 1970, when PA 378 was commissioned, PA 191 moved designations slightly in Bethlehem. Southbound PA 191 came from Nazareth, as Linden Street, and in Bethlehem, it turned west onto Union Boulevard. After it passed underneath I-378, the route turned south onto 3rd Avenue then onto the I-378 freeway. I-378 terminated at the bridge that crosses the Lehigh River and it continued as PA 191 (Wyandotte Street). By 1976, PA 191 was truncated to end at its current location and PA 378 (formerly I-378) replaced its former routing from the Lehigh River bridge to PA 309 in Center Valley.

== Major intersections ==
County	Location	mi	km	Destinations	Notes
Northampton	Bethlehem Township	0.00	0.00	US 22 (Lehigh Valley Thruway) – Easton, Allentown	Interchange; southern terminus
Northampton	Lower Nazareth Township	1.98	3.19	PA 946 west (Daniels Road) – Moorestown	Eastern terminus of PA 946
Northampton	Nazareth	4.27	6.87	PA 248 west (Nazareth Bath Highway) – Lehighton	Southern terminus of concurrency
Northampton	Nazareth	4.48	7.21	PA 248 east (Easton Road) – Easton	Northern terminus of concurrency
Northampton	Stockertown	7.50	12.07	PA 33 – Stroudsburg, Easton	Interchange
Northampton	Bangor	16.93	27.25	PA 512 (Market Street) – Pen Argyl, Mount Bethel	
Monroe	Stroudsburg	26.03	41.89	PA 611 (Park Avenue/Foxtown Hill Road) to I-80 east – Bartonsville, Delaware Water Gap	
Monroe	Stroudsburg	26.46	42.58	I-80 west / US 209 south – Hazleton	Access from PA 191 to westbound I-80/southbound US 209 and from westbound I-80/southbound US 209 to PA 191, exit 307 (I-80/US 209)
Monroe	Stroudsburg	26.52	42.68	US 209 Bus. south (Main Street)	Southern terminus of concurrency with US 209 Bus. southbound
Monroe	Stroudsburg	26.63	42.86	US 209 Bus. north (Main Street/McConnell Street)	Northern terminus of concurrency with US 209 Bus. southbound
Monroe	Stroud Township	30.55	49.17	PA 447 south (Paradise Trail) – East Stroudsburg, Delaware Water Gap	Southern terminus of concurrency
Monroe	Stroud Township	33.05	53.19	PA 447 north (Creek Road) – Canadensis	Northern terminus of concurrency
Monroe	Paradise Township	35.41	56.99	PA 715 south – Tannersville	Northern terminus of PA 715
Monroe	Paradise Township	38.37	61.75	PA 940 west – Mt. Pocono	Eastern terminus of PA 940
Monroe	Paradise Township	39.91	64.23	PA 390 south – Mt. Pocono, Swiftwater	Southern terminus of concurrency
Monroe	Barrett Township	41.97	67.54	PA 390 north (Peterson Road) – Canadensis	Northern terminus of concurrency
Pike	No major junctions				
Wayne	Dreher Township	50.52	81.30	PA 423 south (Carlton Road) – Tobyhanna	Northern terminus of PA 423
Wayne	Dreher Township	53.42	85.97	PA 507 south (Millcreek Road) – Gouldsboro	Southern terminus of concurrency
Wayne	Dreher Township	54.79	88.18	PA 447 south	Northern terminus of PA 447
Wayne	Dreher Township	55.22	88.87	PA 507 north (Lake Wallenpaupack Road) to I-84 / US 6 – Lake Wallenpaupack	Northern terminus of concurrency
Wayne	Sterling Township	59.42	95.63	I-84 – Scranton, Milford	Exit 17 (I-84)
Wayne	Sterling Township	60.33	97.09	PA 196 south (Sterling Road) – Sterling	Southern terminus of concurrency
Wayne	Salem Township	63.24	101.77	PA 590 (Hamlin Highway) – Scranton, Hawley	
Wayne	Salem Township	64.38	103.61	PA 196 north (Easton Turnpike) – South Canaan	Northern terminus of concurrency
Wayne	Lake Township	66.90	107.67	PA 296 north (Gravity Road) – Gravity	Southern terminus of PA 296
Wayne	Honesdale	78.42	126.20	US 6 east (Willow Avenue/Grand Army Of The Republic Highway) – Hawley	Southern terminus of concurrency
Wayne	Honesdale	79.04	127.20	US 6 west (Park Street/Grand Army Of The Republic Highway) – Carbondale	Northern terminus of concurrency
Wayne	Honesdale	79.65	128.18	PA 670 north (Elm Place) – Bethany, Pleasant Mount	Southern terminus of PA 670
Wayne	Lebanon Township	89.56	144.13	PA 371 (Great Bend Turnpike/Cochecton Turnpike) – Pleasant Mount, Damascus	
Wayne	Buckingham Township	110.46	177.77	PA 370 west (Crosstown Highway) – Lake Como, Orson	Eastern terminus of PA 370
West Branch Delaware River		111.54	179.51	Hancock Bridge	
West Branch Delaware River		111.54	179.51	To NY 97 – Hancock	New York state line; access via South Pennsylvania Avenue
1.000 mi = 1.609 km; 1.000 km = 0.621 mi: Concurrency terminus; Incomplete access

== PA 191 Truck ==
Pennsylvania Route 191 Truck
- Location: Northampton County
- Existed: May 2014–March 2016

Pennsylvania Route 191 Truck was a route that followed PA 248, PA 33, and the exit slip-ramps at the PA 33-PA 191 interchange. It was signed in 2014. Signs were removed and PA 191 Truck was decommissioned in 2016.
