= Pennsylvania Route 390 =

State highway in Monroe and Pike counties in Pennsylvania, United States

Pennsylvania Route 390

Route information
- Maintained by PennDOT
- Length: 25.301 mi (40.718 km)

Major junctions
- South end: PA 940 in Paradise Township
- PA 191 in Paradise Township; PA 447 in Barrett Township; I-84 near Promised Land State Park
- North end: PA 507 in Tafton View

Location
- Country: United States
- State: Pennsylvania
- Counties: Monroe, Pike

Highway system
- Pennsylvania State Route System; Interstate; US; State; Scenic; Legislative
| ← PA 388 | → PA 391 |

Pennsylvania Route 390 (PA 390) is a 25.3-mile-long (40.7 km) state highway located in Monroe and Pike counties in Pennsylvania. The southern terminus is at PA 940 in Paradise Township. The northern terminus is at PA 507 in Tafton View. The route is a two-lane undivided road that runs through forested areas in the Pocono Mountains. PA 390 begins at PA 940 west of Paradise Valley and heads northeast. The route runs concurrent with PA 191 between Cresco and Mountainhome before it splits and intersects PA 447 in Canadensis. PA 390 passes through Skytop before it crosses the county line and runs through Promised Land State Park. The route has an interchange with Interstate 84 (I-84) before passing through Tafton and ending at PA 507 near Lake Wallenpaupack.

PA 390 was designated in 1928 to run between PA 90 (now PA 191) in Mountainhome and PA 90/PA 507 in Newfoundland, with PA 90 following the current route south of Mountainhome. The route was realigned in the 1930s to head north from Canadensis to its current terminus at PA 507 north of Tafton, with PA 290 (now PA 447) extended along the former alignment between Canadensis and Newfoundland. PA 90 was shifted to a more direct alignment between Paradise Valley and Cresco in the 1940s, with the former section becoming unnumbered. PA 390 was extended south to its current terminus at PA 940 in the 1970s.

== Route description ==
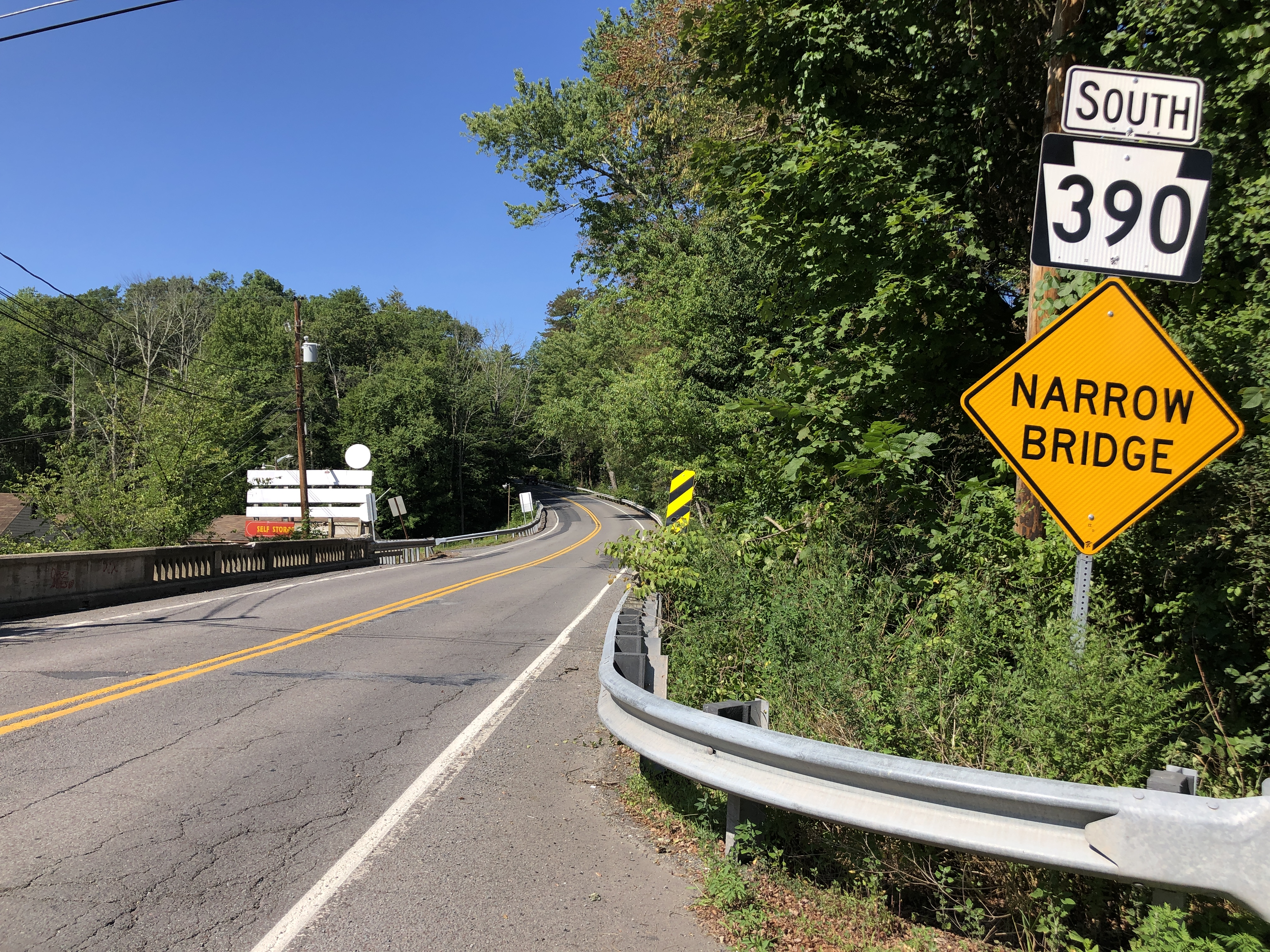
PA 390 southbound past PA 447 in Canadensis

PA 390 begins at an intersection with PA 940 west of the community of Paradise Valley in Paradise Township, Monroe County, which is in the Pocono Mountains region of Pennsylvania, heading northeast on a two-lane undivided road. The route heads through forested areas with some homes, reaching an intersection with PA 191. At this point, PA 390 heads north concurrent with PA 191, running through more dense forests with some development and crossing into Barrett Township. The road turns north-northeast and passes over a Delaware-Lackawanna Railroad line before heading through the community of Cresco. The two routes continue into the residential and commercial community of Mountainhome, where PA 191 splits to the north and PA 390 becomes Peterson Road. The road continues through more wooded areas with some homes as an unnamed road, crossing the Middle Branch Brodhead Creek and intersecting PA 447 in Canadensis. The route becomes Krummel Hill Road and runs through more dense forests with some residential development, heading through Skytop before passing to the east of Mountain Lake and winding north.

PA 390 enters Greene Township in Pike County and becomes Promised Land Road, heading north and northwest through dense forested areas. The road heads north through Roemersville before turning east and northeast as it runs through more forests with some private residential developments. The route heads into Promised Land State Park and turns north, passing to the west of Promised Land Lake and crossing into Palmyra Township. PA 390 leaves the state park and heads into the Delaware State Forest as Fairview Lake Road, continuing north to an interchange with I-84. Past this interchange, the road leaves the state forest and continues through more forested areas, curving to the northeast. The route crosses into Blooming Grove Township and turns to the north as an unnamed road, heading back into Palmyra Township and passing to the east of Fairview Lake before running through Tafton. PA 390 runs through more dense forests with private residential developments, ending at an intersection with PA 507 near the community of Tafton View to the southeast of Lake Wallenpaupack.

== History ==
When Pennsylvania first legislated routes in 1911, what is now PA 390 was not given a route number. PA 390 was designated in 1928 to run from PA 90 (now PA 191) in Mountainhome north to PA 90/PA 507 in Newfoundland, following its current alignment between Mountainhome and Canadensis before it turned northwest to Newfoundland. At this time, the section between Mountainhome and Canadensis was paved while the remainder of the road was unpaved. The present alignment of PA 390 south of Mountainhome was a paved road that was designated as part of PA 90. By 1930, the highway between Canadensis and Lake Wallenpaupack was an unnumbered road that was paved in Monroe County and unpaved in Pike County. In the 1930s, PA 390 was rerouted at Canadensis to head north to PA 507 on the shore of Lake Wallenpaupack north of Tafton. At this time, the entire road north of Canadensis was paved except for a portion near Promised Land State Park. The former alignment of PA 390 between Canadensis and Newfoundland became a northern extension of PA 290 (now PA 447). The unpaved section of PA 390 in Pike County was paved during the 1940s. In addition, PA 90 was shifted east to a new direct alignment between Paradise Valley and Cresco, leaving the former section unnumbered. PA 390 was extended south from Mountainhome to its current southern terminus at PA 940 west of Paradise Valley in the 1970s, running concurrent with PA 191 between Cresco and Mountainhome.

== Major intersections ==
| County | Location | mi | km | Destinations | Notes |
|---|---|---|---|---|---|
| Monroe | Paradise Township | 0.000 | 0.000 | PA 940 – Stroudsburg, Swiftwater, Mt. Pocono | Southern terminus |
| Monroe | Paradise Township | 1.265 | 2.036 | PA 191 south – Paradise Valley | South end of PA 191 overlap |
| Monroe | Barrett Township | 3.345 | 5.383 | PA 191 north – Hamlin | North end of PA 191 overlap |
| Monroe | Barrett Township | 5.592 | 8.999 | PA 447 (Creek Road) – Newfoundland, East Stroudsburg | |
| Pike | Palmyra Township | 20.144– 20.166 | 32.419– 32.454 | I-84 – Scranton, Milford | I-84 exit 26 |
| Pike | Palmyra Township | 25.301 | 40.718 | PA 507 (Lake Wallenpaupack Road) | Northern terminus |
1.000 mi = 1.609 km; 1.000 km = 0.621 mi: Concurrency terminus

== PA 390 Truck ==
Pennsylvania Route 390 Truck
- Location: Pike County

Pennsylvania Route 390 Truck (PA 390 Truck) is a truck route of PA 390 that bypasses a weight-restricted bridge over an outlet of Fairview Lake in Palmyra Township, on which trucks over 29 tons and combination loads over 40 tons are prohibited. The route follows I-84, PA 402, US 6, and PA 507. It was signed in 2013.
