= Pennsylvania Route 507 =

State highway in Pennsylvania, US

Pennsylvania Route 507

Route information
- Maintained by PennDOT
- Length: 27.244 mi (43.845 km)

Major junctions
- South end: I-380 / PA 435 near Gouldsboro
- PA 196 in Angels; PA 191 in Newfoundland; PA 447 in Newfoundland; I-84 in Greene Township; PA 390 near Tafton
- North end: US 6 in Palmyra Township

Location
- Country: United States
- State: Pennsylvania
- Counties: Monroe, Wayne, Pike

Highway system
- Pennsylvania State Route System; Interstate; US; State; Scenic; Legislative
| ← PA 505 | → PA 512 |

Pennsylvania Route 507 (PA 507) is a 27.2-mile-long (43.8 km) state highway located in Monroe, Wayne, and Pike counties in Pennsylvania. The southern terminus is at PA 435 and at an interchange with Interstate 380 (I-380) near Gouldsboro. The northern terminus is at U.S. Route 6 (US 6) in Palmyra Township. PA 507 runs southwest-northeast as a two-lane undivided through forests in the upper reaches of the Pocono Mountains, with the northern section nearly parallel to Lake Wallenpaupack. The route passes through Gouldsboro before it crosses PA 196 in Angels. In Newfoundland, PA 507 and PA 191 run concurrent for about 2 miles (3.2 km) and intersect the north end of PA 447. After splitting from PA 191, the route has an interchange with I-84 and a junction with the northern terminus of PA 390 before ending at US 6. PA 507 was designated between US 611 (now PA 435) west of Gouldsboro and US 6 in Tafton in 1928. The route was fully paved by the 1930s and has remained on the same alignment since.

== Route description ==
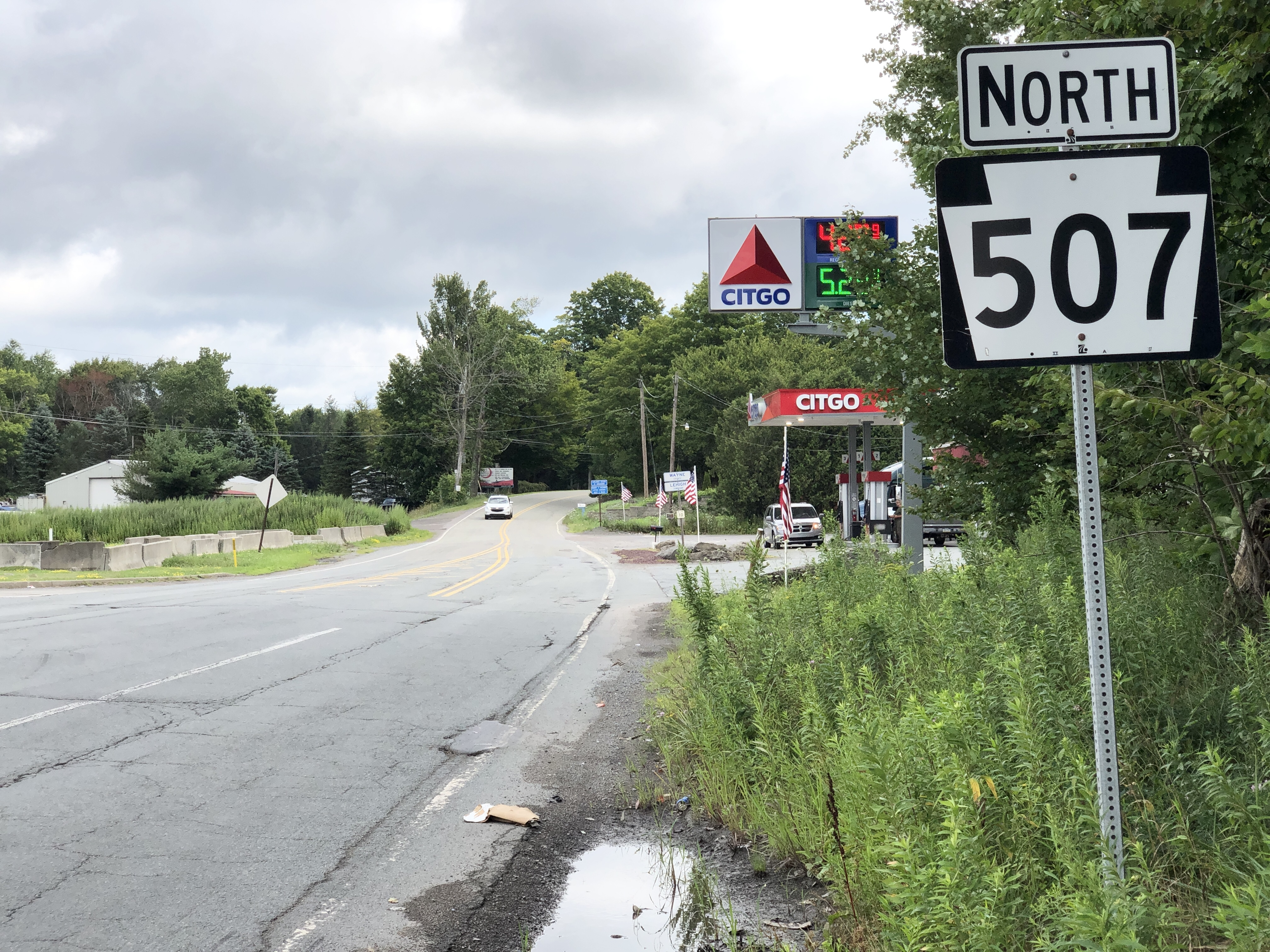
PA 507 northbound past PA 435 in Coolbaugh Township

PA 507 begins at PA 435 and I-380 in Coolbaugh Township, Monroe County, heading northeast on a two-lane undivided road. From the terminus, Coolbaugh Road continues southwest. A short distance later, the road enters Lehigh Township in Wayne County and becomes Main Street, running through dense forests with some homes to the north of Gouldsboro State Park. PA 507 curves to the east and heads through wooded areas of homes, entering the community of Gouldsboro, where it crosses a Delaware-Lackawanna Railroad line. The road continues north-northeast through dense forests with some private residential developments. The route heads into Dreher Township and becomes Millcreek Road, coming to an intersection with PA 196 in Angels. PA 507 continues northeast through more forests with some housing developments, curving east and coming to an intersection with PA 191. Here, the route turns north to form a concurrency with PA 191, heading north on Main Street through wooded areas with some fields and homes to the west of Wallenpaupack Creek. The road curves to the north-northeast and intersects the northern terminus of PA 447 in Newfoundland. The two routes pass through rural residential and commercial development before PA 191 splits to the northwest and PA 507 heads northeast as Lake Wallenpaupack Road.

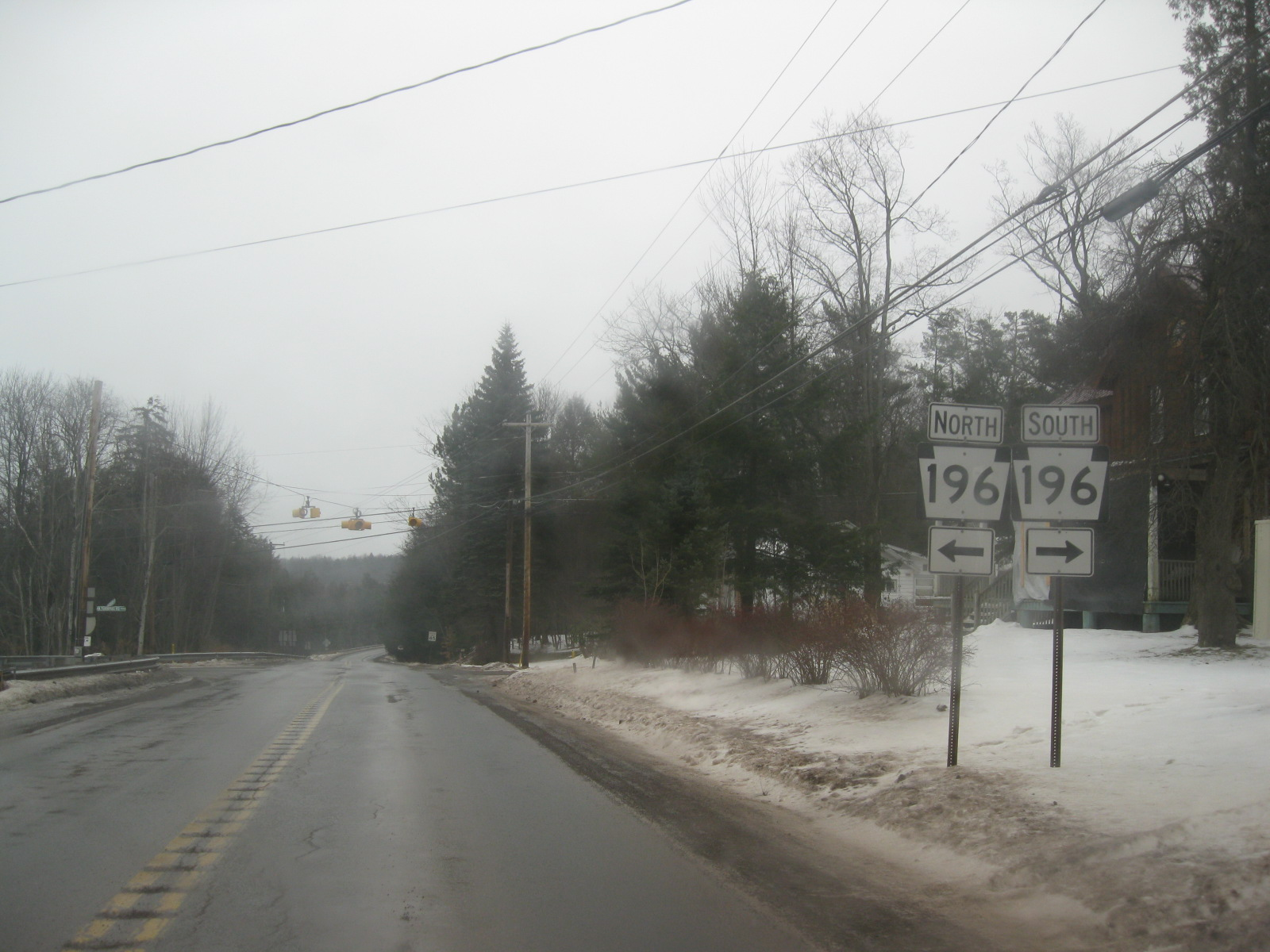
PA 507 approaching the intersection with PA 196 in Dreher Township

PA 507 crosses the Wallenpaupack Creek into Greene Township, Pike County, running through woodland with some development and turning to the north-northwest. The road heads to the north and comes to an interchange with I-84. Following this interchange, the route runs through forests, turning to the northeast. PA 507 continues into Palmyra Township and heads through forested areas of private residential developments on the southeast shore of Lake Wallenpaupack. The road winds northeast along the lakeshore, passing through Paupack and coming to an intersection with the northern terminus of PA 390 near Tafton. Past this, PA 507 continues north through wooded residential development to the east of the lake, reaching its northern terminus at an intersection with US 6.

== History ==
When Pennsylvania first legislated routes in 1911, the present-day corridor of PA 507 was designated as part of Legislative Route 168 between the border of Lackawanna and Wayne counties and Gouldsboro and as Legislative Route 254 between Gouldsboro and Tafton. PA 507 was designated in 1928 to run from US 611 (now PA 435) west of Gouldsboro northeast to US 6 in Tafton. At this time, the route was paved between US 611 and PA 90 (now PA 191) near Newfoundland and for a short stretch to the north of Newfoundland. By 1930, PA 507 was paved between PA 90 north of Newfoundland and PA 790 in Greentown along with a small section near Lake Wallenpaupack. The entire length of the route was paved during the 1930s. In 1969, an interchange with I-81E (now I-380) was built with US 611 near the southern terminus of PA 507, at which point US 611 headed south along the freeway. An interchange between I-84 and PA 507 was completed in 1968 and opened to traffic in the 1970s.

== Major intersections ==
| County | Location | mi | km | Destinations | Notes |
|---|---|---|---|---|---|
| Monroe | Coolbaugh Township | 0.000 | 0.000 | I-380 / PA 435 north (Drinker Turnpike) to I-80 – Stroudsburg, Hazleton, Scranton | Southern terminus; southern terminus of PA 435; exit 13 on I-380 |
| Wayne | Dreher Township | 8.089 | 13.018 | PA 196 (South Turnpike Road) | |
| Wayne | Dreher Township | 10.603 | 17.064 | PA 191 south (South Sterling Road) – Cresco | Southern end of PA 191 concurrency |
| Wayne | Dreher Township | 11.930 | 19.199 | PA 447 south | Northern terminus of PA 447 |
| Wayne | Dreher Township | 12.312 | 19.814 | PA 191 north (East Sterling Road) – Hamlin | Northern end of PA 191 concurrency |
| Pike | Greene Township | 14.617– 14.639 | 23.524– 23.559 | I-84 – Scranton, Milford | Exit 20 on I-84 |
| Pike | Palmyra Township | 25.755 | 41.449 | PA 390 south – Promised Land | Northern terminus of PA 390 |
| Pike | Palmyra Township | 27.244 | 43.845 | US 6 (Lake Wallenpaupack Road) | Northern terminus |
1.000 mi = 1.609 km; 1.000 km = 0.621 mi: Concurrency terminus
