= Pennsylvania Route 447 =

State highway in Pennsylvania, US

Pennsylvania Route 447

Route information
- Maintained by PennDOT
- Length: 26.665 mi (42.913 km)

Major junctions
- South end: US 209 in Smithfield Township
- US 209 Bus. in East Stroudsburg; PA 191 in Stroud Township; PA 390 in Barrett Township
- North end: PA 191 / PA 507 in Dreher Township

Location
- Country: United States
- State: Pennsylvania
- Counties: Monroe, Pike, Wayne

Highway system
- Pennsylvania State Route System; Interstate; US; State; Scenic; Legislative
← PA 446	→ PA 449
← PA 189	PA 190	→ PA 191

Pennsylvania Route 447 (PA 447) is a 26.66-mile-long (42.91 km) north–south state route located in northeast Pennsylvania in the Pocono Mountains. The southern terminus of the route is at U.S. Route 209 (US 209) near an interchange with Interstate 80 (I-80) in Smithfield Township. The northern terminus is at PA 191 and PA 507 in Dreher Township. The route heads northwest from US 209 in Monroe County and forms a brief concurrency with US 209 Business (US 209 Bus.) in the northern part of East Stroudsburg. PA 447 continues and forms a concurrency with PA 191 in Analomink before winding north through rural areas. The route bends northwest and crosses PA 390 in Canadensis. PA 447 passes through a section of Pike County before entering Wayne County and reaching its northern terminus.

In 1928, the road was designated as PA 190 between US 209 (now US 209 Bus.) in East Stroudsburg and PA 90 (now PA 191) south of Analomink, PA 290 between PA 90 in Analomink and PA 390 in Canadensis, and as part of PA 390 between Canadensis and PA 90/PA 507 in Newfoundland. PA 290 was extended north to Newfoundland in the 1930s, replacing PA 390, which was realigned. PA 190 was decommissioned in the 1940s. The road between US 611 (now I-80) in East Stroudsburg and PA 90 in Analomink became a southern extension of PA 196 in the 1950s. PA 447 was designated onto its current alignment in the 1960s, replacing the southern portion of PA 196 and the entire length of PA 290.

== Route description ==
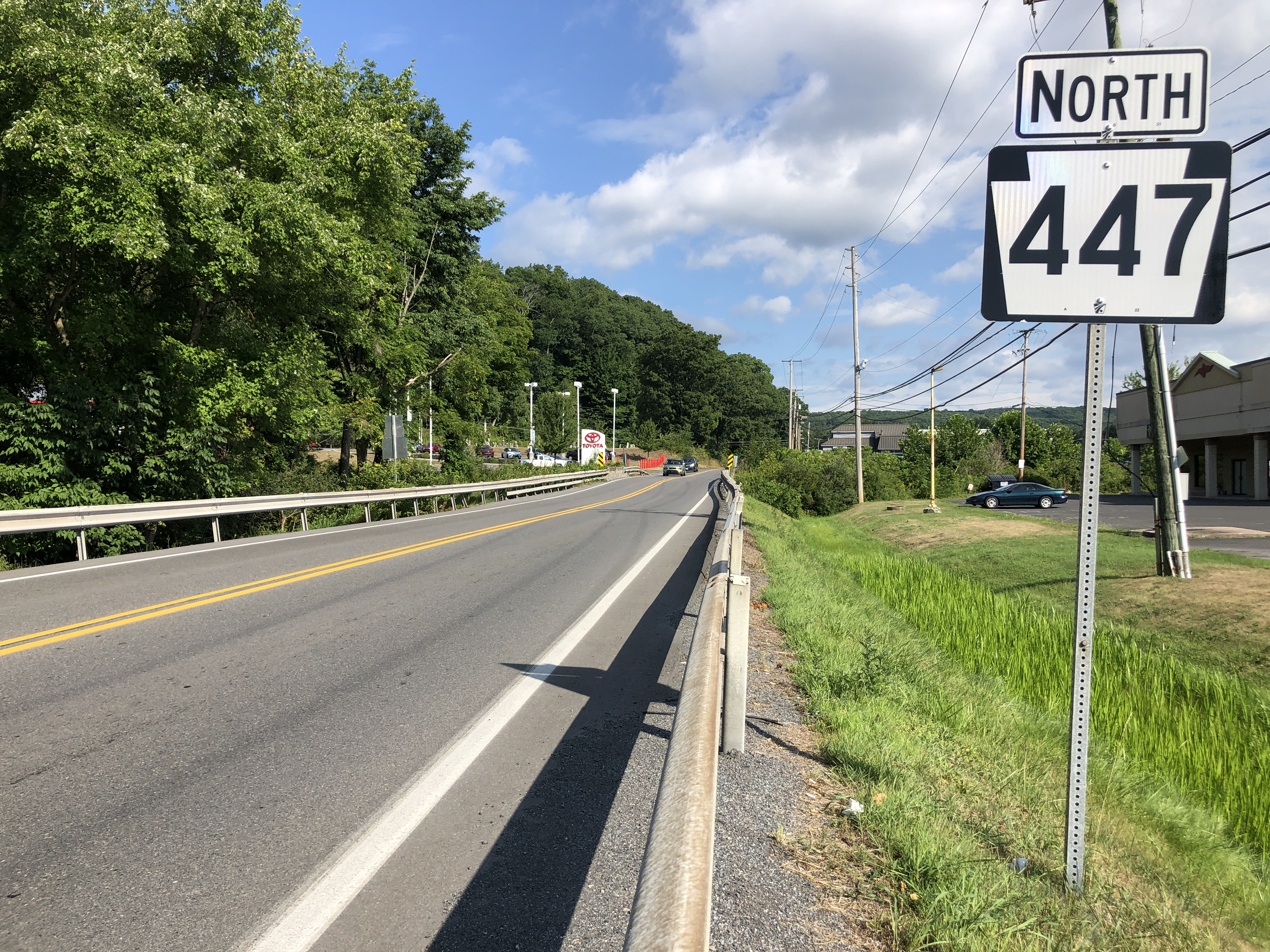
PA 447 northbound in Stroud Township

PA 447 begins at a traffic signal with US 209 (Seven Bridges Road) in Smithfield Township, just north of exit 309 (formerly 52) of I-80. PA 447 proceeds northwest along Independence Road through Smithfield Township, a two-lane roadway through a commercial section of the township, passing west of a park and ride lot owned by Martz Trailways. The route soon crosses into the borough of East Stroudsburg, turning westward along Independence Road. PA 447 passes south of Terra Greens Golf Course, soon entering the northern reaches of downtown East Stroudsburg. A short distance into the center, PA 447 intersects with US 209 Bus. (North Courtland Street).

PA 447 and US 209 Business runs north for three blocks as a concurrency via North Courtland. At the junction with Milford Road, US 209 Business turns northeast along Milford while PA 447 turns northwest along Analomink Road. Now in Stroud Township, PA 447 crosses Samba Creek and bypasses the Gravel Place section of East Stroudsburg, paralleling the Delaware-Lackawanna Railroad, passing Pinebrook Park, and reaching an intersection with PA 191 (North Fifth Street). At this junction, PA 191 and PA 447 continue northwest along Analomink Road, passing the future site of the Analomink New Jersey Transit station.

PA 191 and PA 447 continue northwest and soon bends to the northeast into the Analomink section of Stroud Township. Paralleling Brodhead Creek, the routes continue northeast and soon north past the Evergreen Golf Club. Just north of the golf club, PA 447 turns northwest along Creek Road while PA 191 continues west along Analomink Road. The route bends northeast along Brodhead Creek, crossing into Price Township, crossing through the dense woods of Monroe County. PA 447 and Brodhead Creek wind northwest for several miles, soon turning northward near Circle H Road. Near Laurel Run Road, PA 447 soon leaves the dense woods for a residential section of Price Township. When the route and the creek turn northward again, they return to the woods, which begins to break up a short distance later.

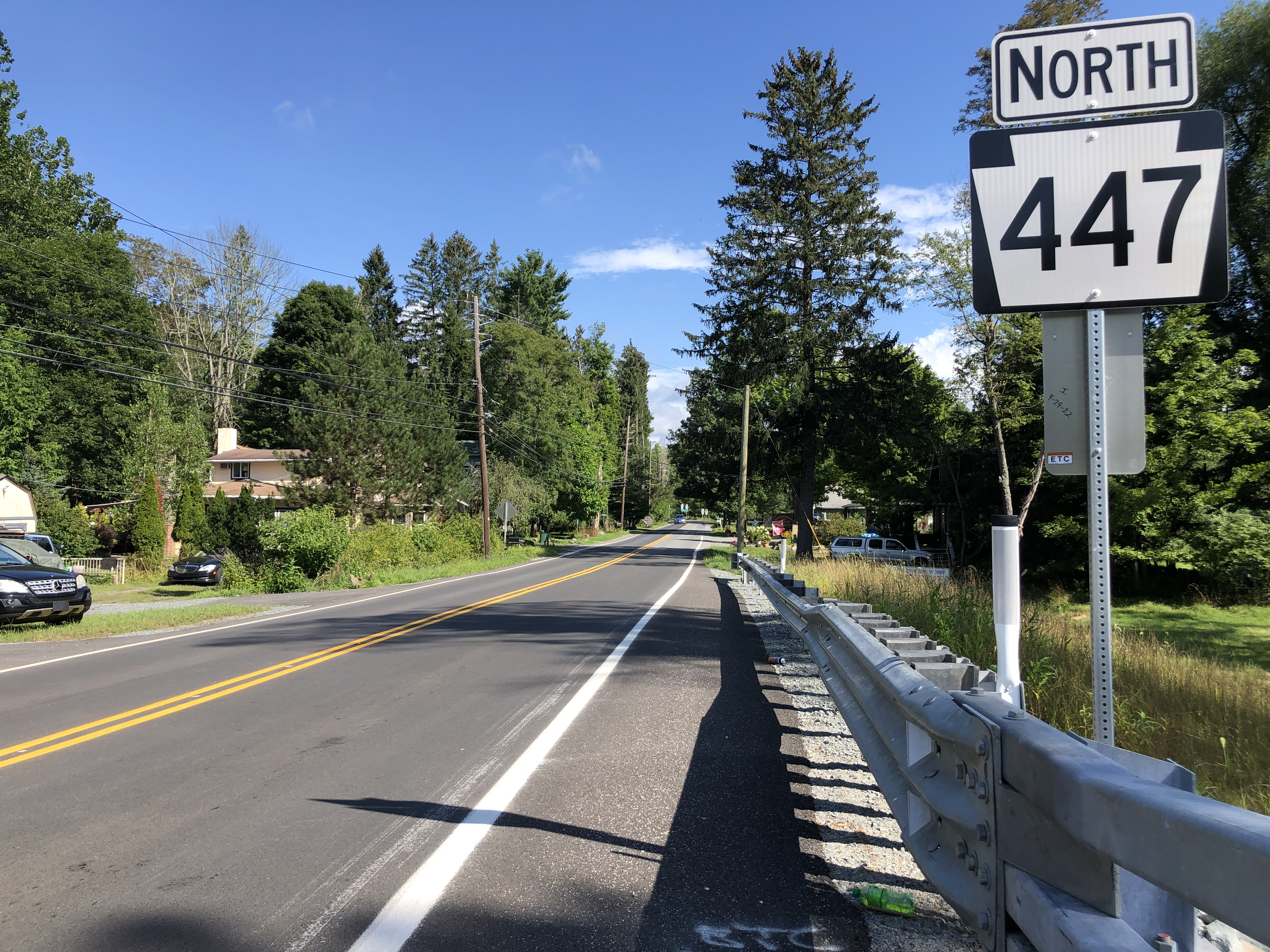
PA 447 northbound in Barrett Township

PA 447 continues north, passing some residences near Snow Hill Road, passing an intersection with Bear Town Road, crossing into Barrett Township. PA 447 continues northwest along Brodhead Creek, passing a small pond nearby. At the junction with Spruce Cabin Road, the route turns to the north again, reaching a junction with PA 390 (Krummel Hill Road) in Canadensis. PA 447 continues northwest from PA 390, remaining a two-lane residential street through Barrett Township. After turning northward again, the route remains a two-lane woods/residential road, reaching the village of Coveville. Changing names to Spruce Mountain Road, PA 447 climbs Spruce Mountain and turns northeast as it bypasses Lake in the Clouds. Turning northwest once again, PA 447, the route continues north past the lake, reaching the Pike County line.

Now in the Pike County municipality of Greene Township, PA 447 crosses north past dense woods and residences as Panther Road, a two-lane roadway. The route makes a large curve to the northwest through the area of Lake Russell. Rather than crossing through the dense woods, PA 447 becomes a two-lane roadway through fields of Greene Township. At Pine Grove Road, the route turns northward, reaching the village of Panther, a small residential community in Greene Township. The route becomes predominantly flat, crossing a junction with Stoney Lonesome Road, where the Panther Road name is dropped from the roadway. Turning northwest, the route crosses over Wallenpaupack Creek, crossing into Wayne County.

Now in Dreher Township and the village of Newfoundland, PA 447 turns west immediately into an intersection with PA 191 and PA 507 (Main Street). This junction marks the northern terminus of PA 447, which continues west as Crestmont Drive towards the village of Jericho.

== History ==
Pennsylvania Route 190
- Location: East Stroudsburg – Analomink
- Existed: 1928–1940s

Pennsylvania Route 290
- Location: Analomink – Newfoundland
- Existed: 1928–1960s

When Pennsylvania first legislated routes in 1911, what is now PA 447 was not given a route number. In 1928, the road between US 209 (now US 209 Bus.) in East Stroudsburg and PA 90 (now PA 191) south of Analomink was designated PA 190, the road between PA 90 in Analomink and PA 390 in Canadensis was designated PA 290, and the roadway between Canadensis and PA 90/PA 507 in Newfoundland was the northern section of PA 390. At this time, these segments were unpaved except for a small portion of PA 290 south of Canadensis and the section of PA 90 between PA 190 and PA 290. By 1930, the entire length of PA 190 was paved along with a section of PA 390 south of Newfoundland. In the 1930s, PA 390 was realigned north of Canadensis and PA 290 was extended north along the former alignment of PA 390 to end at PA 90/PA 507 in Newfoundland. By this time, the entire length of PA 290 was paved.

PA 190 was decommissioned in the 1940s, leaving the road between East Stroudsburg and Analomink unnumbered. In 1956, the road between an interchange with US 611 (later I-80) in East Stroudsburg and PA 90 in Analomink became a southern extension of PA 196. PA 447 was designated to its current alignment between US 209 in East Stroudsburg and PA 191/PA 507 in Newfoundland in the 1960s, replacing the section of PA 196 between East Stroudsburg and Analomink and the entire length of PA 290 between Analomink and Newfoundland.

== Major intersections ==
County	Location	mi	km	Destinations	Notes
Monroe	Smithfield Township	0.000	0.000	US 209 (Seven Bridges Road) to I-80 – Delaware Water Gap, Stroudsburg, Marshalls Creek, Milford	Southern terminus
Monroe	East Stroudsburg	2.001	3.220	US 209 Bus. south (North Courtland Street) – Stroudsburg	Southern terminus of US 209 Bus. concurrency
Monroe	East Stroudsburg	2.158	3.473	US 209 Bus. north (Milford Road) – Marshalls Creek	Northern terminus of US 209 Bus. concurrency
Monroe	Stroud Township	4.241	6.825	PA 191 south (North 5th Street) – Stroudsburg	Southern terminus of PA 191 concurrency; village of Analomink
Monroe	Stroud Township	6.711	10.800	PA 191 north (Analomink Road) – Cresco, Mt. Pocono	Northern terminus of PA 191 concurrency
Monroe	Barrett Township	16.527	26.598	PA 390 (Krummel Hill Road) – Cresco, Promised Land	
Pike	No major junctions				
Wayne	Dreher Township	26.665	42.913	PA 191 / PA 507 (Main Street)	Northern terminus; village of Newfoundland
1.000 mi = 1.609 km; 1.000 km = 0.621 mi: Concurrency terminus
