= Panther, Pennsylvania =

Unincorporated community in Pennsylvania, U.S.

Coordinates: 41°16′48″N 75°17′58″W

Panther is an unincorporated community in Greene Township, Pike County, Pennsylvania, United States.

== History ==
Early trappers and loggers would frequent the trading post in present-day Canadensis. Panther received its name from the abundance of what were known to be "panthers". There are many theories as to what the animal actually was that gave this town its name due to the ambiguity of the word "panther". Theories include the Nittany Lion, mountain lion, Puma, Cougar, Bobcat and even an actual black eastern panther. Today, there are none in existence in this area; the last mountain lions was seen in 1874. The last wild panther known to have walked in the Pennsylvania woods did so in Berks County.
