= Flying Dollar Airport =

- IATA: none; ICAO: none; FAA LID: 8N4

Summary
- Airport type: Public
- Owner: Flying Dollar LLC
- Serves: Canadensis, Pennsylvania
- Location: Monroe County
- Elevation AMSL: 1,430 ft (440 m)
- Coordinates: 41°12′53″N 075°14′48″W
- Website: www.flyingdollar.com

Map
- Location in Pennsylvania 8N4 (the United States)

Runways
Direction	Length		Surface
Direction	ft	m	Surface
2/20	2,405	733	Turf

Statistics (2016)
- Aircraft operations: 240
- Based aircraft: 2
- Source: Federal Aviation Administration

Flying Dollar Runway
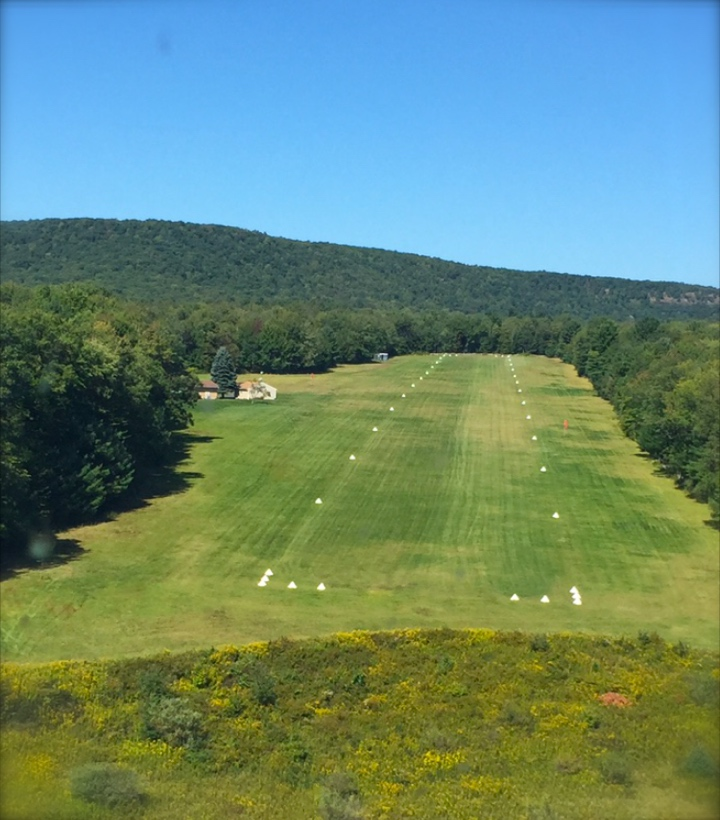
- Runway 02, Summer, 2016

Flying Dollar Airport (FAA LID: 8N4) is a privately owned, public-use airport located two nautical miles (4 km) north of the central business district of Canadensis in Barrett Township, Monroe County, Pennsylvania, United States.

== Facilities ==
Flying Dollar Airport covers an area of 70 acres (28 ha) at a maximum elevation of 1,430 feet (436 m) above mean sea level. It has one runway designated 2/20 with a turf surface measuring 2,405 by 100 feet (733 x 30.5 m). It is situated 8 NM northeast of Pocono Mountains Municipal Airport (KMPO) and 23 NM east of Wilkes-Barre/Scranton International Airport (KAVP).

West of the runway, there is a private residence and one steel hangar (60 x 60 feet), erected in the 1930s and since renovated with a one-piece hydraulic door and restored to its original checkerboard roof pattern, visible from the air.

== Operations ==
The Pennsylvania Bureau of Aviation classifies the Flying Dollar Airport as a public basic utility airport suitable for operations in daytime visual flight rules (VFR) conditions. Its runway is considered moderately challenging due to a 4.5% gradient. The southern threshold of the runway is 1,322 feet MSL while the northern threshold is 1,430 feet MSL and abuts trees that are 94 feet high. Due to these conditions, landings on runway 20 and takeoffs on runway 02 are both prohibited.

The field averages 21 operations a month, 100% single-engine, rotorcraft and ultra-light aircraft. Flying Dollar is particularly popular with powered parachutes and light sport aircraft, several of which form a local consortium called The Wing Nuts, who are based on the field and arrange biannual fly-ins.

== History ==
In 1929, Barclay White and Raymond Price Sr., charter subscribers of nearby Skytop Lodge, formed a corporation and sold stock to finance the creation of what was then called Barrett Airport, buying farmland from local families adjacent to the Lodge for their site. The airfield was constructed in order to provide a means of regular air service to and from the Poconos and therefore to benefit Skytop Lodge, its membership, and the community at large.

The airport was renamed the Flying Dollar Airport in 1971 by Ivan L. ("Ike") Battern, a Seaboard World Airlines pilot and its owner until his death in 2011. Battern's widow sold the airfield at auction in 2014, but it retains both its name and its status as a public basic utility airport. Flying Dollar is the oldest airport in the Pocono Mountains.

Previous owners and managers include:

- 1929: Skytop Lodges, Inc
- 1932: Charles Otto
- 1933: Lewin Barringer
- 1935: Don Nelson
- 1960s: Sky View Estates (Carl C. Riess Jr., Pres.)
- 1970: Ivan L. Battern
- 2011: Andrea Battern
- 2014: Flying Dollar LLC

== See also ==
- List of airports in Pennsylvania
