= Canadensis, Pennsylvania =

Unincorporated community in Pennsylvania, US

- Unincorporated community
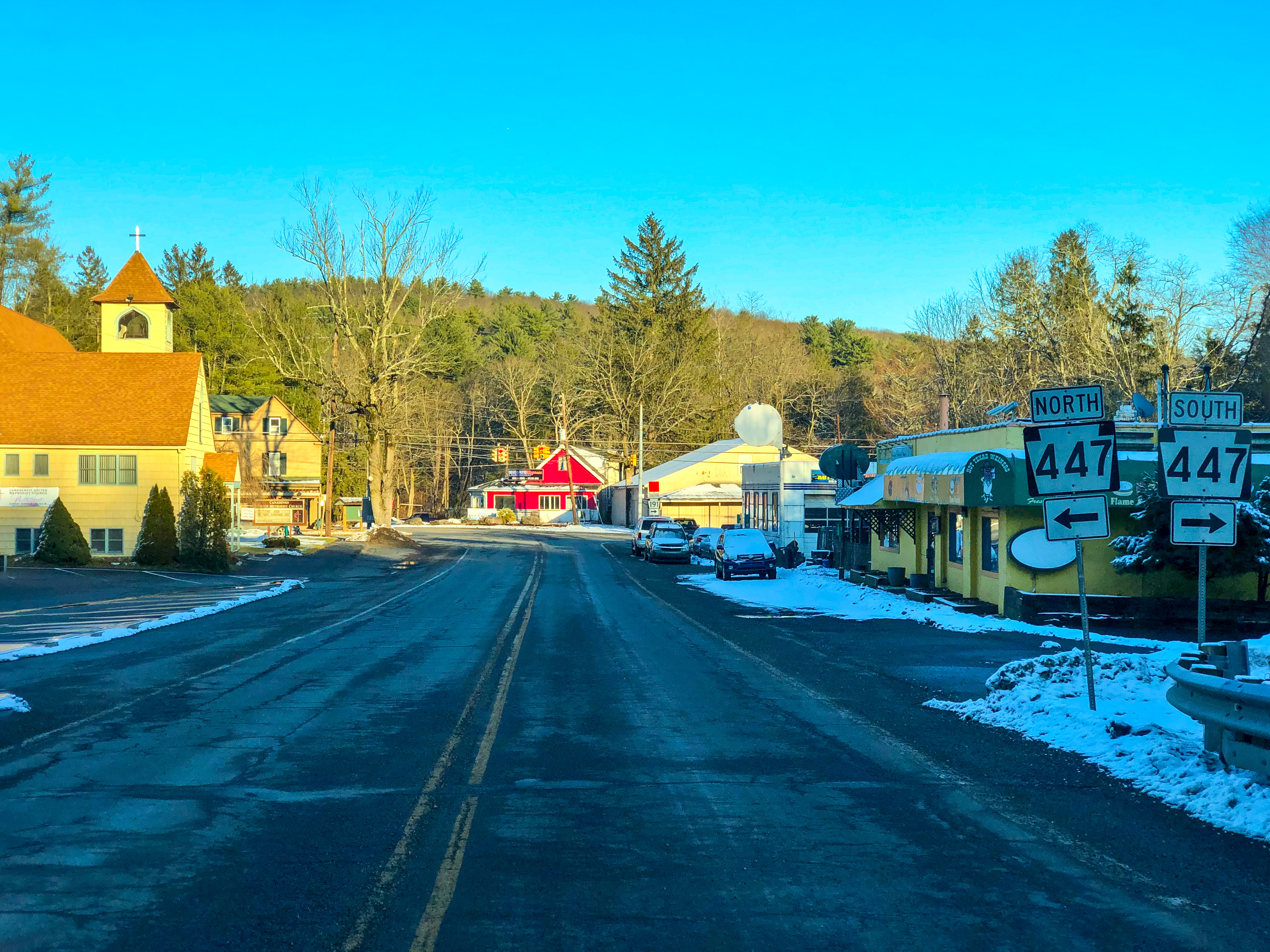
- Canadensis, Pennsylvania

- Location within Pennsylvania Location within the United States
- Coordinates: 41°11′31″N 75°15′05″W
- Country: United States
- State: Pennsylvania
- County: Monroe
- Township: Barrett

Government
  - Township Supervisor: Ralph Megliola
- Elevation: 994 ft (303 m)

Population (2000)
  - Total: 2,164
  - Density: 44/sq mi (17/km^{2})
- Time zone: UTC-5 (Eastern (EST))
  - Summer (DST): UTC-4 (EDT)
- ZIP code: 18325
- Area code(s): 570
- GNIS feature ID: 1192235
- Website: Barrett Township

Canadensis is an unincorporated community in Barrett Township, Monroe County, Pennsylvania. Canadensis is a former sundown town and is home to a few small shops, restaurants and churches. The "crossroads", which is the intersection of Pennsylvania Routes 447 and 390, is the center of the community.

== Pronunciation ==
Canadensis is pronounced Can-ah-DEN-sis.

== Tourism ==
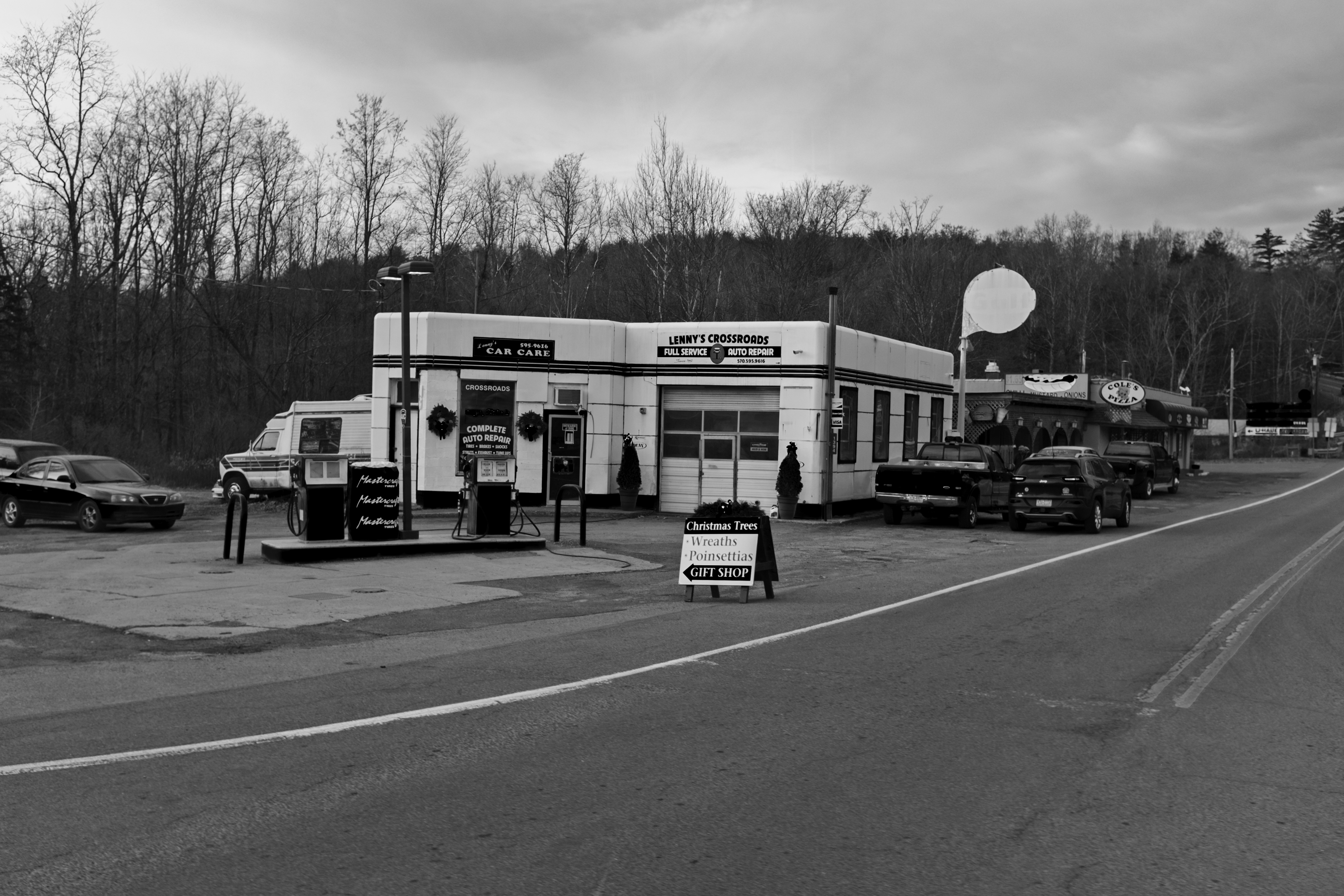
Business in Canadensis

Canadensis is located in the "heart" of the Poconos; it is home to a number of bed and breakfasts. It is home to Spruce Lake Retreat. Spruce Lake hosts groups and also has an overnight camp and day-camp for kids. The area is more for the outdoor enthusiasts, mostly during the summer. In the summer, Canadensis serves as a home to many sleepaway campers from the tri-state area at Camp Canadensis. There are no actual tourism sites within Canadensis. Canadensis has a few restaurants and small businesses which function to serve the local economy rather than attract tourists.

== Transportation ==
Canadensis has two state roads, Pennsylvania Route 447 and Route 390, which intersect at the center of town. Its airport is the Flying Dollar Airport.

== Bordering towns ==
- Panther (north)
- Skytop (northeast)
- Buck Hill Falls (near Skytop)
- Mountainhome (southwest)
- Cresco (southwest)
- Price Township (south)

== Schools ==
Pocono Mountain School District (Bordering East Stroudsburg Area School District)

Bais Menachem YDP (Youth Development Program) is a branch of the central Tomchei Tmimim Lubavitch that moved to Canadensis in the Summer of 2018. Bais Menachem YDP is an all-male, ultra-orthodox, Chassidic youth program for high school and college aged boys. Its core philosophies include Chassidic Jewish principles, and ensuring that its students learn to become happy, healthy, respectful, and productive members of society at large. Bais Menachem YDP is an organization that focuses on building self efficacy and educating young men in their Jewish traditions, while at the same time encouraging participants to cultivate positive and healthy growth through music, art, hands on vocational projects, farming, recreation and other creative avenues.

== Government ==
Canadensis has no formal government; it is under the jurisdiction of the Barrett Township supervisors.
