= Rocky Hill Ultralight Flightpark =

- IATA: none; ICAO: none; FAA LID: 48P

Summary
- Airport type: Public use
- Owner: William G. Barry
- Location: Cresco, Pennsylvania
- Elevation AMSL: 1,240 ft / 378 m
- Coordinates: 41°08′52″N 075°16′30″W
- Interactive map of Rocky Hill Ultralight Flightpark

Runways
Direction	Length		Surface
Direction	ft	m	Surface
9/27	1,000	305	Turf

Statistics (2008)
- Aircraft operations: 150
- Source: Federal Aviation Administration

Rocky Hill Ultralight Flightpark (FAA LID: 48P) is a public use ultralight airport located one nautical mile (1.85 km) southeast of the central business district of Cresco, a town in Monroe County, Pennsylvania, United States.

== Facilities and aircraft ==
Rocky Hill Ultralight Flightpark covers an area of 1,230 acres (500 ha) at an elevation of 1,240 feet (378 m) above mean sea level. It has one runway designated 9/27 with a turf surface measuring 1,000 by 100 feet (305 x 30 m). For the 12-month period ending April 17, 2008, the airport had 150 general aviation aircraft operations.

== See also ==
- List of airports in Pennsylvania
