= Newfoundland, Pennsylvania =

Unincorporated community in Pennsylvania, US

- Village
- Village of Newfoundland
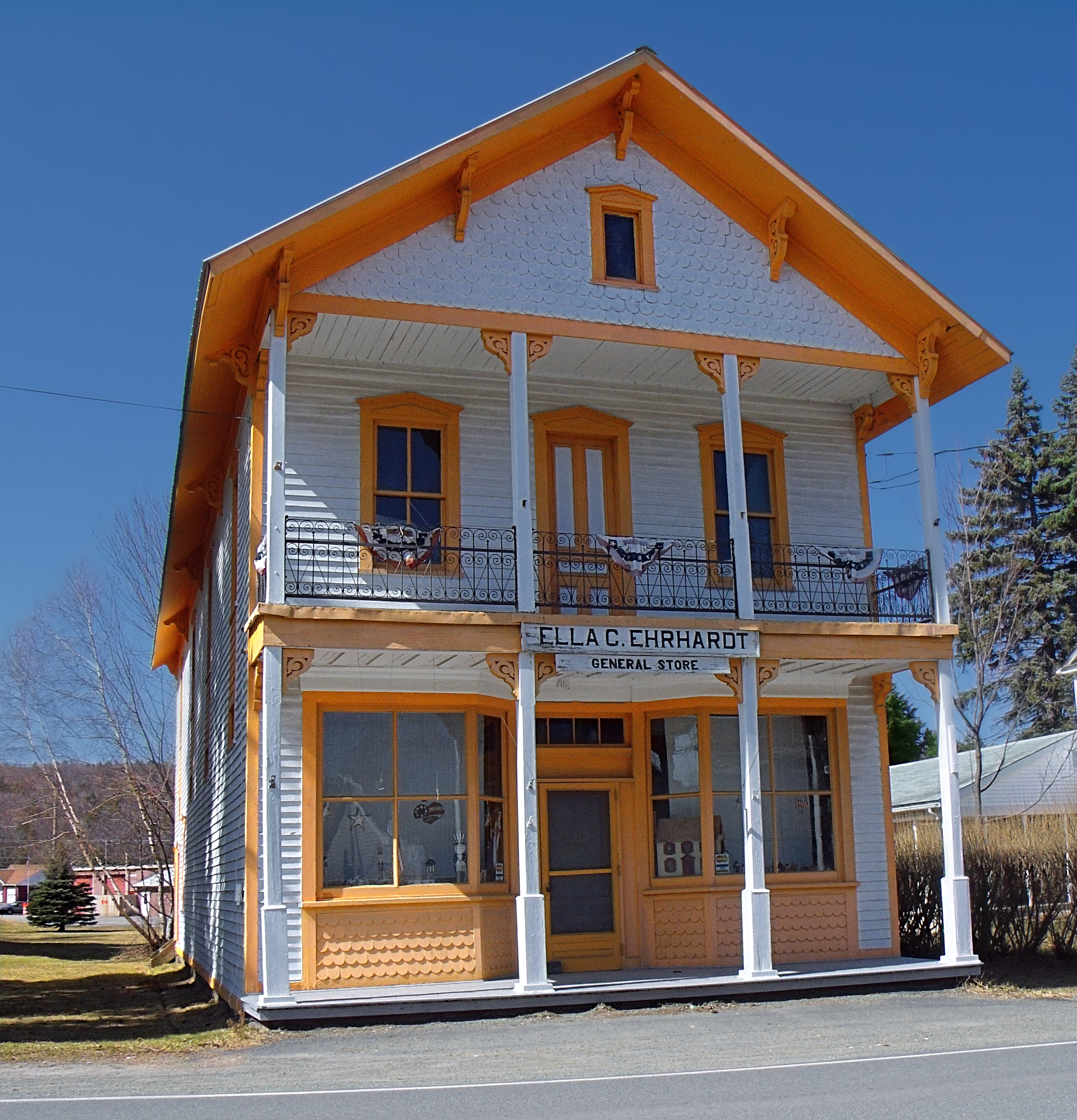
- The historic Ella C. Ehrhardt General Store in Newfoundland.

- Newfoundland's Location within Pennsylvania. Newfoundland (the United States)
- Coordinates: 41°18′26″N 75°17′12″W
- Country: United States
- State: Pennsylvania
- U.S. Congressional District: PA-8
- School District: Wallenpaupack Area
- County: Wayne
- Magisterial District: 22-3-01
- Township: Dreher
- Settled: 1829
- Founder: Daniel Stroud
- Elevation: 1,300 ft (400 m)
- Time zone: UTC-5 (Eastern (EST))
  - Summer (DST): UTC-4 (Eastern Daylight (EDT))
- ZIP code: 18445
- Area code: 570
- GNIS feature ID: 1182395
- FIPS code: 42-127-19864-53552
- Waterways: Kresswood Lake, Wallenpaupack Creek (East Branch)

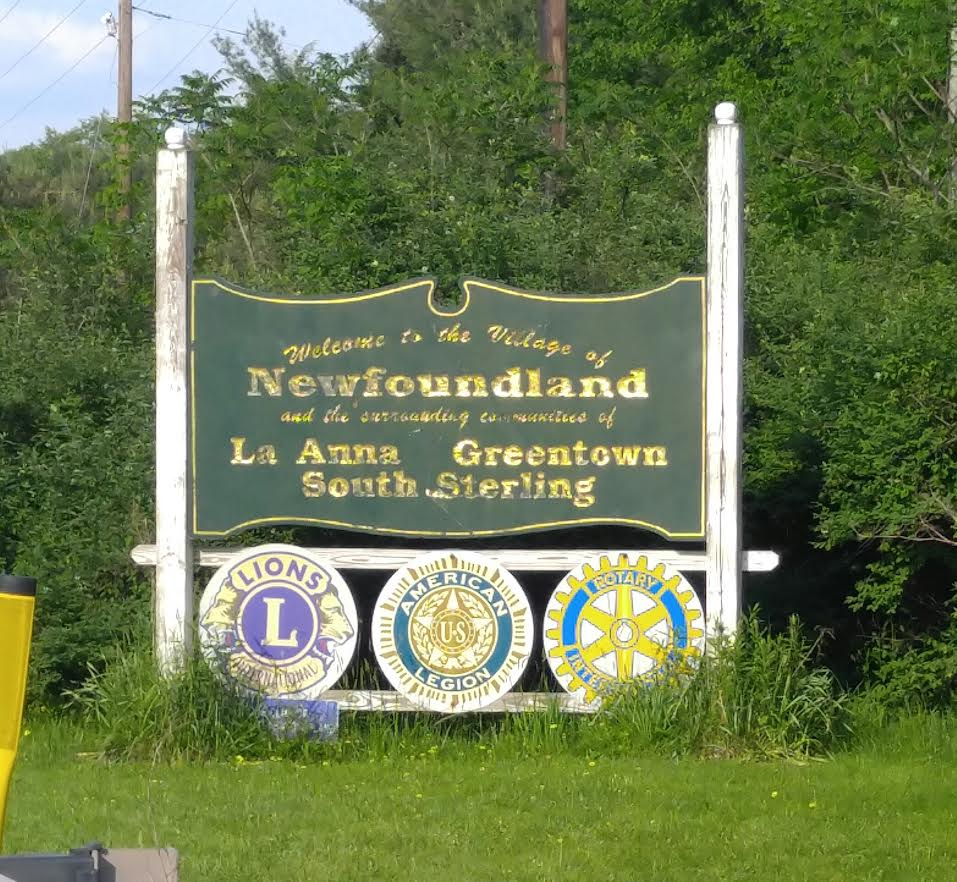
A sign welcoming commuters to Newfoundland and the surrounding areas.

Newfoundland (/njuːˈfaʊndlənd/ new-FOWND-lənd) is a village in Dreher Township, Wayne County, Pennsylvania, United States. It is most famously known as host to the Greene-Dreher-Sterling Fair every Labor Day weekend.

Newfoundland is also host to an annual fireman's picnic and parade every 4th of July weekend. Promised Land State Park is close to the village.

== Geography ==
Newfoundland is located along the East Branch of the Wallenpaupack Creek, which feeds into Lake Wallenpaupack to the north. It is about 25 miles (40 km) southeast of Scranton, Pennsylvania.

== Education ==
Newfoundland is home to the South Elementary School, which falls under the purview of the Wallenpaupack Area School District. South Elementary currently serves students grades K through 5.

== Services ==
Two emergency services are headquartered in Newfoundland: the Greene-Dreher Volunteer Fire Association and the Newfoundland Area Ambulance Association. They both provide coverage for the village and surrounding Dreher Township, in addition to portions of adjoining Lehigh and Sterling Townships in Wayne County, as well as parts of Greene, and Palmyra Townships in Pike County, Pennsylvania, and Coolbaugh Township in Monroe County, Pennsylvania.

Dreher Township's municipal building is located in Newfoundland.

== Transportation ==
Major roads in Newfoundland include PA 507, PA 191, and PA 447. Neighboring villages are Greentown, Pennsylvania; Sterling, Pennsylvania; Tafton, Pennsylvania; and Hamlin, Pennsylvania.

== Notable people ==
- Johnny "Onionhead" Eng⁣ — Hong Kong-born triad leader, Eng's estate was confiscated by the FBI
- Hyung Jin Moon⁣ — Son of late founder of the Unification Church, Sun Myung Moon, and South Korean-American pastor and co-founder of local Unification Church sect 'World Peace and Unification Sanctuary'.
- Michael Schoeffling — Schoeffling is a retired actor and model who played Jake Ryan in 1984's Sixteen Candles and was in several other classic movies. He currently lives here with his wife and two children, and owns a woodworking shop.

== Controversy ==
On February 28, 2018, the town was host to a commitment ceremony held by World Peace and Unification Sanctuary, where hundreds of worshippers clutching unloaded and zip-tied AR-15 rifles drank holy wine and exchanged or renewed wedding vows, prompting a nearby school to cancel classes due to safety concerns.
