= Paradise Valley, Pennsylvania =

Unincorporated community in Pennsylvania, US

- Unincorporated community
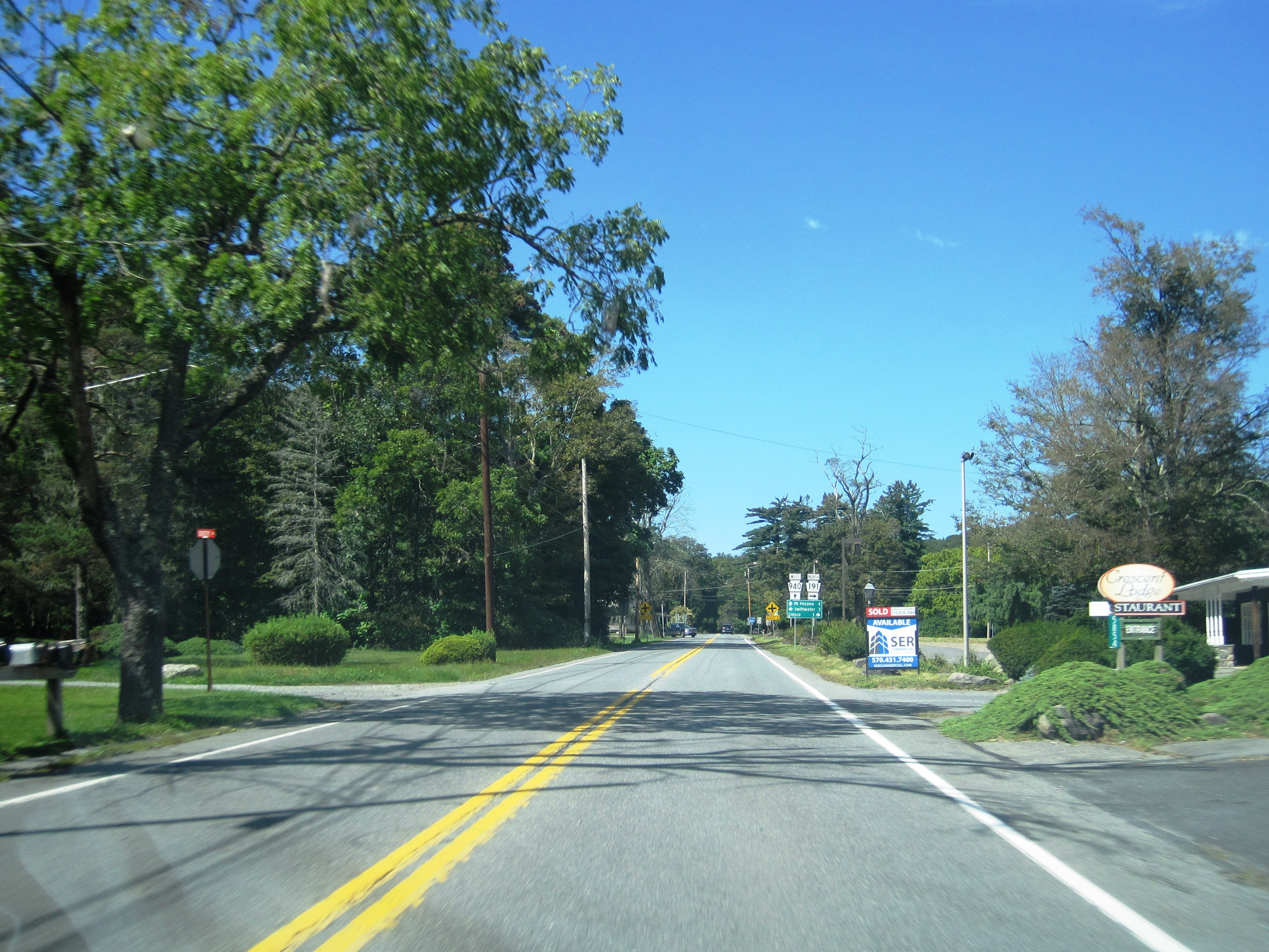
- Along northbound PA 191 before PA 940

- Location within Pennsylvania Location within the United States
- Coordinates: 41°7′19″N 75°16′51″W
- Country: United States
- State: Pennsylvania
- County: Monroe
- Township: Paradise
- Elevation: 965 ft (294 m)
- Time zone: UTC-5 (Eastern (EST))
  - Summer (DST): UTC-4 (EDT)
- ZIP code: 18326
- Area codes: 570 and 272
- GNIS feature ID: 1183288

Paradise Valley is an unincorporated community in Paradise Township in Monroe County, Pennsylvania, United States. It is located at the intersection of Pennsylvania Route 191 and Pennsylvania Route 940.
