= Cresco, Pennsylvania =

Unincorporated community in Pennsylvania, US

- Unincorporated community
- Location within Pennsylvania Location within the United States
- Coordinates: 41°09′14″N 75°16′50″W
- Country: United States
- State: Pennsylvania
- County: Monroe
- Township: Barrett
- Elevation: 1,197 ft (365 m)
- Time zone: UTC-5 (Eastern (EST))
  - Summer (DST): UTC-4 (EDT)
- ZIP code: 18326
- Area codes: 570 and 272
- GNIS feature ID: 1172678

Cresco is an unincorporated area in Barrett Township, Monroe County, Pennsylvania. It is located in the Pocono Mountains. The ZIP code is 18326.

Other nearby villages include Buck Hill Falls, Canadensis, Skytop, and Mountainhome. Due to the small size and proximity of the surrounding villages, locals often colloquially refer to the area by the township name, Barrett, instead of the village name.

== Nature and Wildlife ==
Cresco is home to a variety of wildlife including white-tailed deer, American black bears, and foxes. Streams, forests, and wetlands make up the local geography. The Brodhead Creek runs through Cresco and the surrounding villages. It is a popular spot for trout fishing. Pennsylvania fishing licenses are required. For more info on trout fishing in the area see the Brodhead Trout Chapter. The Brodhead Watershed Organization is a local resource for hiking maps, local parks, and birdwatching in the area. Rattlesnake Falls and Cresco Heights are popular hiking spots.

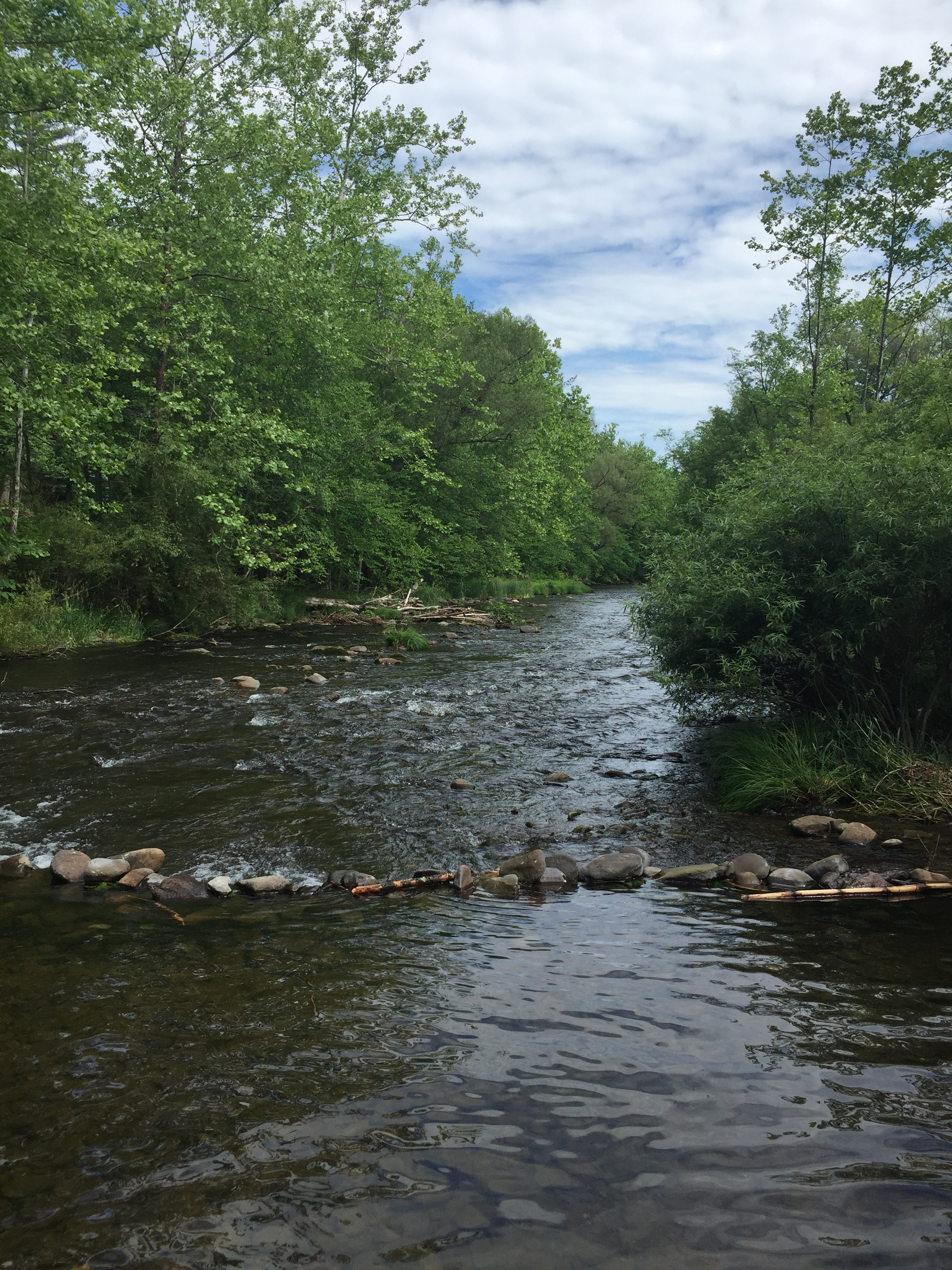
Brodhead Creek runs through Cresco along State Route 447 and feeds into the Delaware River. Considered one of the birthplaces of American fly fishing, it is a popular spot for trout fishing.

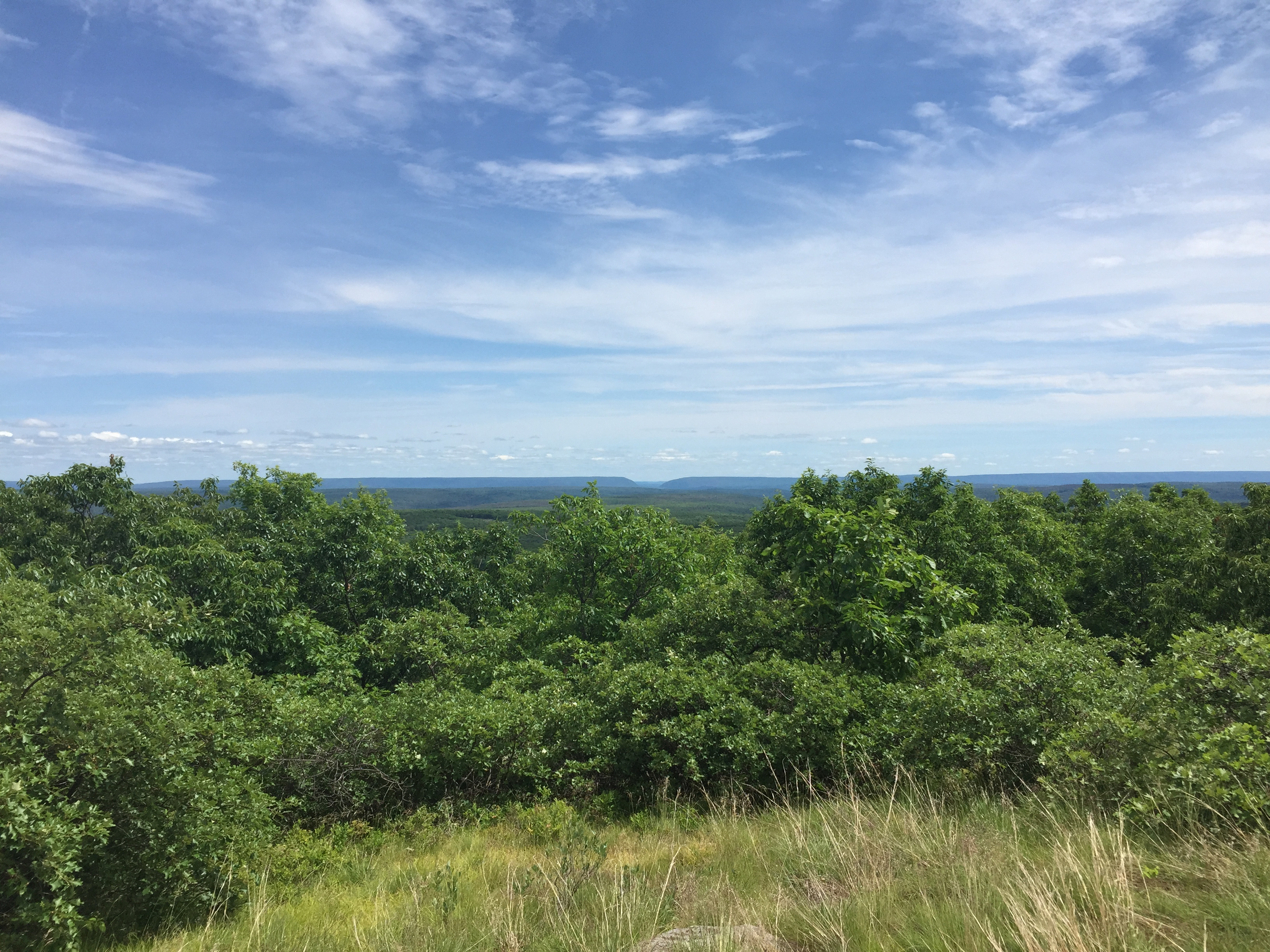
Cresco Heights (elevation: ~1,719 feet) is a hiking spot near Rattlesnake Falls with views of the Pocono Mountains and the Delaware Water Gap.

== Tourism ==
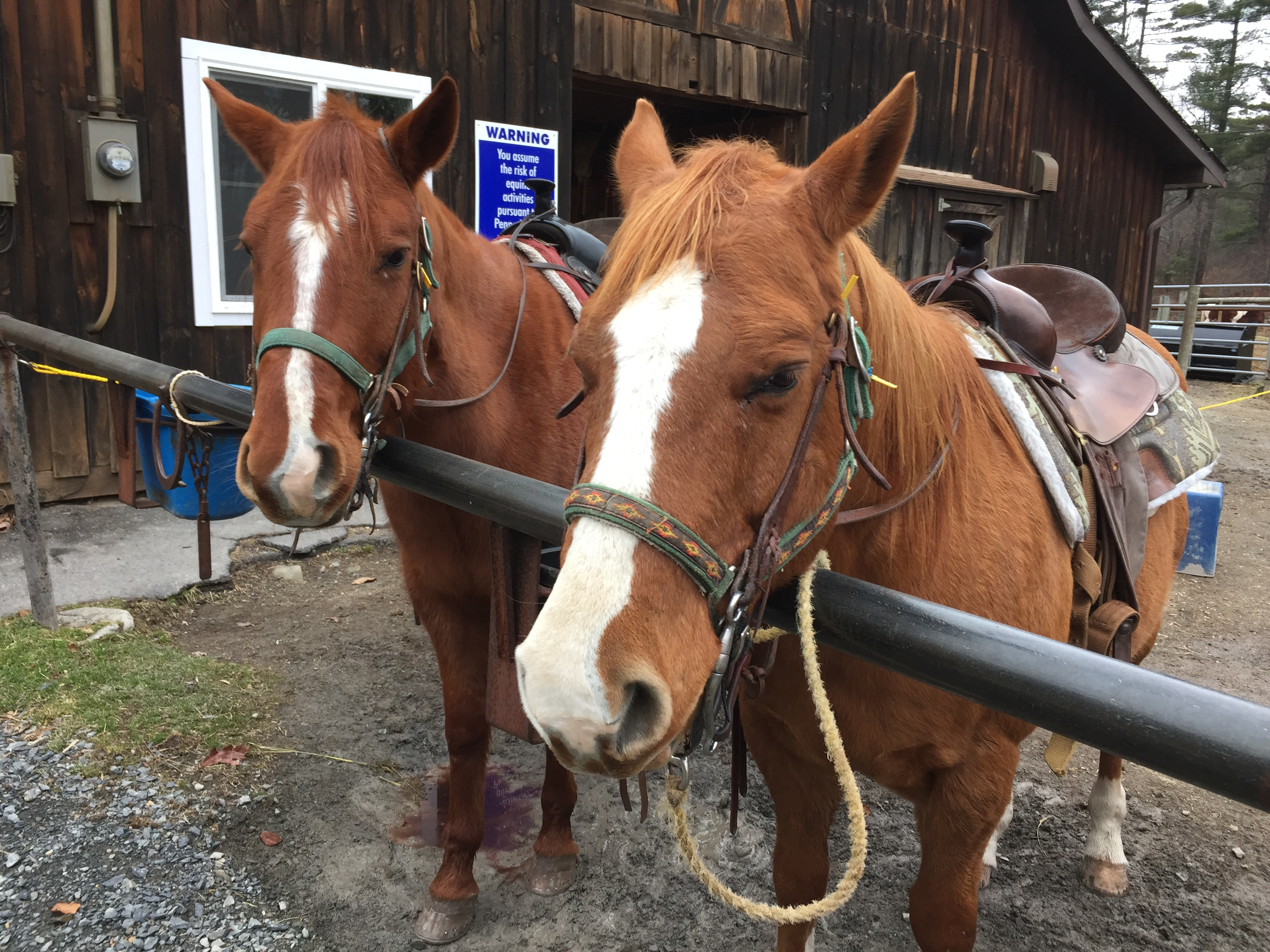
Two horses waiting for riders at Mountain Creek Riding Stables, located on Route 940.

Although Cresco is part of the Pocono Mountains tourism area, it is located further off of the main highway so it receives significantly less traffic. Callie's Pretzel Factory and Callie's Candy Kitchen are the most popular tourist attractions. The Cresco Train Station Museum is also a popular historic site for residents and tourists. The train station no longer offers passenger train service, but is primarily used by the lumber treatment company adjacent to the tracks. Antique shops, hiking, horseback riding, fishing, and camping also draw in visitors. Mountain Creek Riding Stables and Pleasant Ridge Farm and Equestrian Center are two horseback riding destinations. The Paradise Fishing Preserve, a trout hatchery located on the edge of town, offers a fishing spot for tourists and residents.

== Local businesses ==
Cresco is home to mainly mom and pop stores. These include Lewis' Supermarket, Mick Motors, Price's Lumber and General Store (now affiliated with Steele's True Value Hardware), Basso Italiana, Kasa's Pizza and a number of antique shops. There is a CVS Pharmacy and Family Dollar located off of Route 390 in the center of town.

Weiler Corporation and J.A. Reinhardt Manufacturing are two manufacturing companies and the largest employers in town.

== Library and Community Center ==
The Barrett Paradise Friendly Library serves all of the villages of Barrett Township and neighboring Paradise Township. The library offers free internet access, computer stations, ebooks, print books, magazines, and newspapers.

The Friendly Community Center, located in the home of the previous Barrett Friendly Library, offers a place for residents to connect and engage in community programming.

=== Transportation ===
The city is served by the Rocky Hill Ultralight Flightpark, an ultra-light aircraft airport.

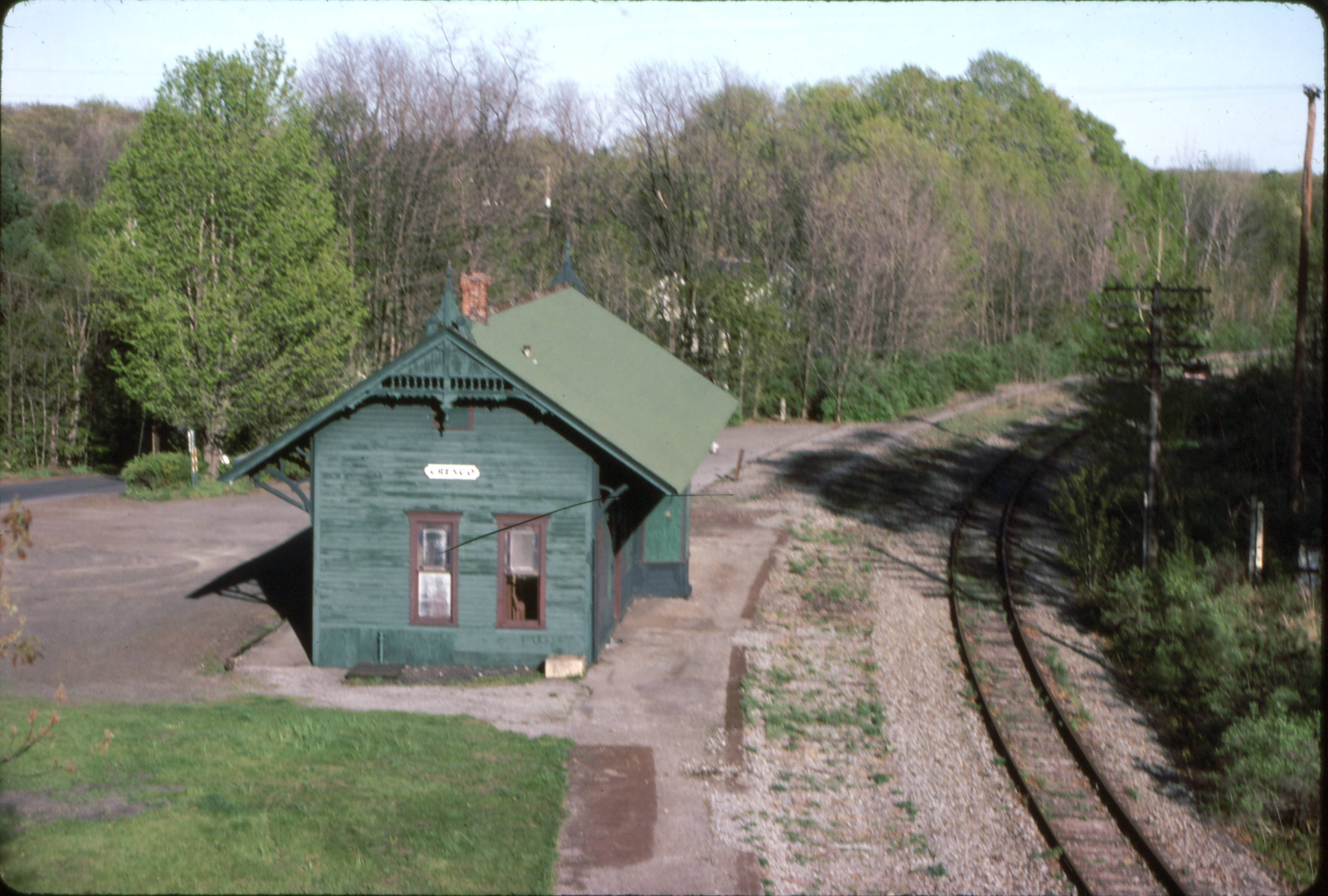
Erie Lackawanna depot in Cresco

Well into the 1960s, the Erie Lackawanna Railroad operated several trains a day that made stops in Cresco. These included the Lake Cities, Phoebe Snow, Pocono Express and the Twilight. The last train was the Lake Cities on January 6, 1970.

== Education ==
Barrett Township and Paradise Township are in the Pocono Mountain School District.

The Roman Catholic Diocese of Scranton operates area Roman Catholic schools. The diocese formerly operated Monsignor McHugh School in Paradise Township, with a Cresco address. It opened in 1961. Enrollment declined in the period circa 2015-2020 by 61%. In the 2019-2020 school year, the enrollment was 97. Had the school stayed open, only 70 students were scheduled to attend the following school year. The school closed that school year.

Notre Dame Jr./Sr. High School is the area Catholic high school. It took graduates from McHugh.
