= Barrett Township, Pennsylvania =

Township in Pennsylvania, US

- Township
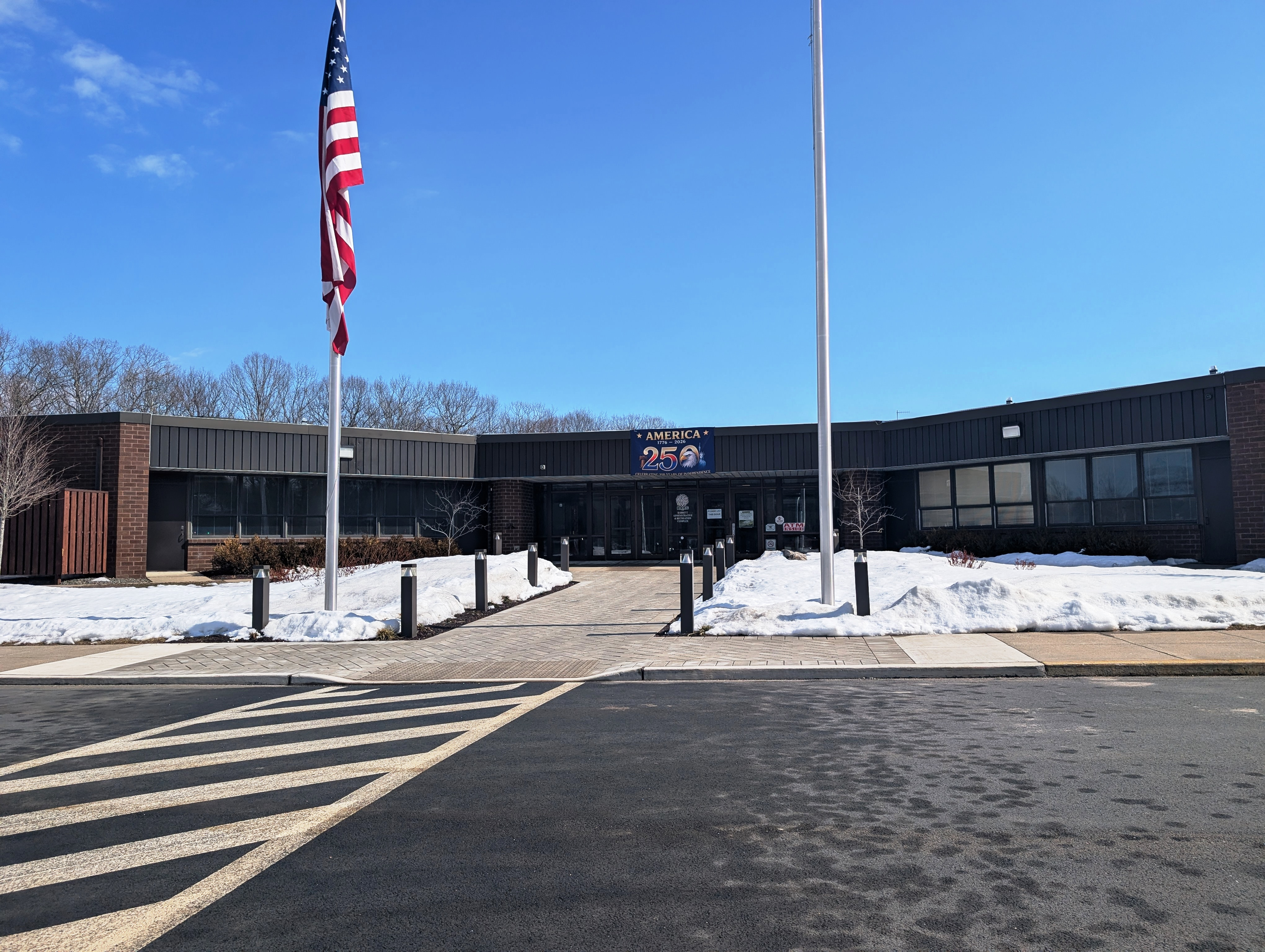
- Barrett Township Municipal Building

- Location of Pennsylvania in the United States
- Coordinates: 41°13′00″N 75°11′59″W
- Country: United States
- State: Pennsylvania
- County: Monroe

Area
  - Total: 52.99 sq mi (137.24 km^{2})
  - Land: 52.38 sq mi (135.66 km^{2})
  - Water: 0.61 sq mi (1.59 km^{2})
- Elevation: 1,407 ft (429 m)

Population (2020)
  - Total: 4,053 ▼
  - Estimate (2021): 4,061
  - Density: 77.4/sq mi (29.88/km^{2})
- Time zone: UTC-5 (EST)
  - Summer (DST): UTC-4 (EDT)
- Area code: 570
- FIPS code: 42-089-04320
- Website: www.barretttownship.com

Barrett Township is a township in Monroe County, Pennsylvania, United States. The population was 4,053 at the 2020 census. Two Poconos resort communities, Buck Hill Falls and Skytop, are located within the township. It is located 38 miles from Scranton and 48 miles from Wilkes-Barre. There is one privately owned, public-use airport in Barrett Township, called the Flying Dollar Airport.

== Geography ==
According to the United States Census Bureau, the township has a total area of 53.2 square miles (138 km^{2}), of which 52.6 square miles (136 km^{2}) is land and 0.6 square miles (1.6 km^{2}) (1.22%) is water. It contains the census-designated place of Mountainhome.

== Demographics ==
Historical population
Census	Pop.	Note	%±
2000	3,880		—
2010	4,225		8.9%
2020	4,053		−4.1%
2021 (est.)	4,061		0.2%
U.S. Decennial Census

As of the census of 2010, there were 4,225 people, 2,529 households, and 1,839 families residing in the township. The population density was 79.7 people per square mile (30.8 people/km^{2}). The racial makeup of the township was 91.4% White, 3.9% African American, 0.1% Native American, 0.9% Asian, 1.6% from other races, and 1.9% from two or more races. Hispanic or Latino of any race were 5.2% of the population.

There were 2,529 households, out of which 27% had children under the age of 18 living with them, 48.5% were married couples living together, 8.6% had a female householder with no husband present, and 39.3% were non-families. 28.7% of all households were made up of individuals, and 13.9% had someone living alone who was 65 years of age or older. The average household size was 2.3 and the average family size was 2.9.

In the township the population was spread out, with 20.2% under the age of 18, 6.6% from 18 to 24, 27.4% from 25 to 44, 26.1% from 45 to 64, and 16.0% who were 65 years of age or older. The median age was 45.8 years. For every 100 females, there were 98.8 males. For every 100 females age 18 and over, there were 94.3 males.

The median income for a household in the township was $54,332, and the median income for a family was $59,230. Males had a median income of $37,291 versus $33,474 for females. The per capita income for the township was $27,157. About 7.2% of families and 9.4% of the population were below the poverty line, including 12.4% of those under age 18 and 4.2% of those age 65 or over.

United States presidential election results for Barrett Township, Pennsylvania
Year	Republican		Democratic		Third party(ies)	
Year	No.	%	No.	%	No.	%
2024	1,337	55.02%	1,072	44.12%	21	0.86%
2020	1,208	51.51%	1,103	47.04%	34	1.45%
2016	1,050	53.96%	812	41.73%	84	4.32%
2012	949	51.27%	865	46.73%	37	2.00%
2008	981	49.07%	985	49.27%	33	1.65%
2004	1,057	53.82%	882	44.91%	25	1.27%
2000	872	54.47%	668	41.72%	61	3.81%

== Transportation ==
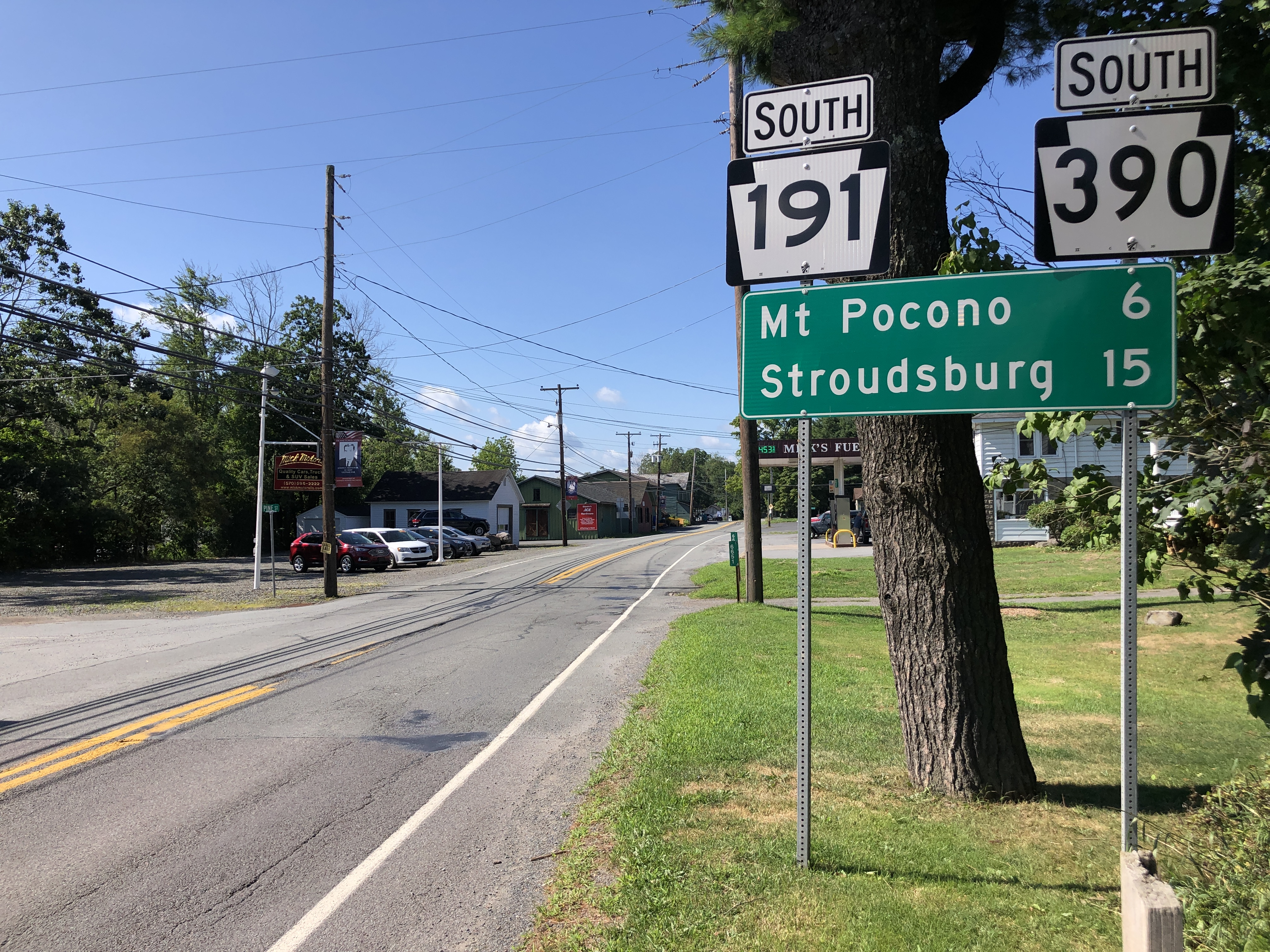
PA 191/PA 390 southbound in Barrett Township

As of 2018, there were 63.42 miles (102.06 km) of public roads in Barrett Township, of which 25.40 miles (40.88 km) were maintained by the Pennsylvania Department of Transportation (PennDOT) and 38.02 miles (61.19 km) were maintained by the township.

Pennsylvania Route 191, Pennsylvania Route 390 and Pennsylvania Route 447 are the numbered highways serving Barrett Township. PA 191 follows a southeast-northwest alignment across southern and western portions of the township. PA 390 follows a southwest-northeast alignment across the middle of the township, including a concurrency with PA 191. Finally, PA 447 follows a southeast-northwest alignment through the center of the township.

== Education ==
Barrett Township is in the Pocono Mountain School District.

== Ecology ==
According to the A. W. Kuchler U.S. potential natural vegetation types, Barrett Township would have a dominant vegetation type of Appalachian Oak (104) with a dominant vegetation form of Eastern Hardwood Forest (25). The peak spring bloom typically occurs in late-April and peak fall color usually occurs in mid-October. The plant hardiness zone is 5b with an average annual extreme minimum air temperature of −12.1 °F (−25 °C).

== Climate ==
According to the Köppen climate classification system, Barrett Township has a Warm-summer Humid continental climate (Dfb).

Climate data for Barrett Twp (41.2020, -75.2427), elevation 1,155 ft (352 m), 1991-2020 normals, extremes 1981-2024
Month	Jan	Feb	Mar	Apr	May	Jun	Jul	Aug	Sep	Oct	Nov	Dec	Year
Record high °F (°C)	63.7 (17.6)	72.9 (22.7)	84.1 (28.9)	90.3 (32.4)	92.2 (33.4)	92.9 (33.8)	95.9 (35.5)	95.8 (35.4)	92.4 (33.6)	85.1 (29.5)	78.0 (25.6)	68.9 (20.5)	95.9 (35.5)
Mean daily maximum °F (°C)	33.5 (0.8)	36.2 (2.3)	44.5 (6.9)	57.9 (14.4)	68.7 (20.4)	76.6 (24.8)	81.2 (27.3)	79.5 (26.4)	72.8 (22.7)	60.7 (15.9)	49.2 (9.6)	38.5 (3.6)	58.4 (14.7)
Daily mean °F (°C)	25.1 (−3.8)	27.0 (−2.8)	34.9 (1.6)	46.9 (8.3)	57.4 (14.1)	65.8 (18.8)	70.5 (21.4)	68.8 (20.4)	62.0 (16.7)	50.3 (10.2)	39.7 (4.3)	30.7 (−0.7)	48.4 (9.1)
Mean daily minimum °F (°C)	16.8 (−8.4)	17.9 (−7.8)	25.3 (−3.7)	35.8 (2.1)	46.2 (7.9)	55.0 (12.8)	59.8 (15.4)	58.2 (14.6)	51.2 (10.7)	40.0 (4.4)	30.2 (−1.0)	23.0 (−5.0)	38.4 (3.6)
Record low °F (°C)	−22.2 (−30.1)	−14.2 (−25.7)	−7.1 (−21.7)	10.5 (−11.9)	25.8 (−3.4)	34.0 (1.1)	38.8 (3.8)	34.5 (1.4)	27.2 (−2.7)	16.9 (−8.4)	0.5 (−17.5)	−14.0 (−25.6)	−22.2 (−30.1)
Average precipitation inches (mm)	3.67 (93)	2.92 (74)	3.81 (97)	4.10 (104)	4.07 (103)	5.00 (127)	4.48 (114)	4.53 (115)	4.97 (126)	5.00 (127)	3.57 (91)	4.30 (109)	50.43 (1,281)
Average snowfall inches (cm)	10.4 (26)	14.4 (37)	8.0 (20)	1.3 (3.3)	0.0 (0.0)	0.0 (0.0)	0.0 (0.0)	0.0 (0.0)	0.0 (0.0)	1.4 (3.6)	2.8 (7.1)	9.7 (25)	48.0 (122)
Average dew point °F (°C)	17.2 (−8.2)	17.1 (−8.3)	23.1 (−4.9)	32.3 (0.2)	45.0 (7.2)	55.9 (13.3)	60.2 (15.7)	59.4 (15.2)	53.5 (11.9)	41.9 (5.5)	30.0 (−1.1)	23.2 (−4.9)	38.3 (3.5)
Source 1: PRISM
Source 2: NOHRSC (Snow, 2008/2009 - 2024/2025 normals)
