= Greene Township, Pike County, Pennsylvania =

Township in Pennsylvania, US

Greene Township
- Township
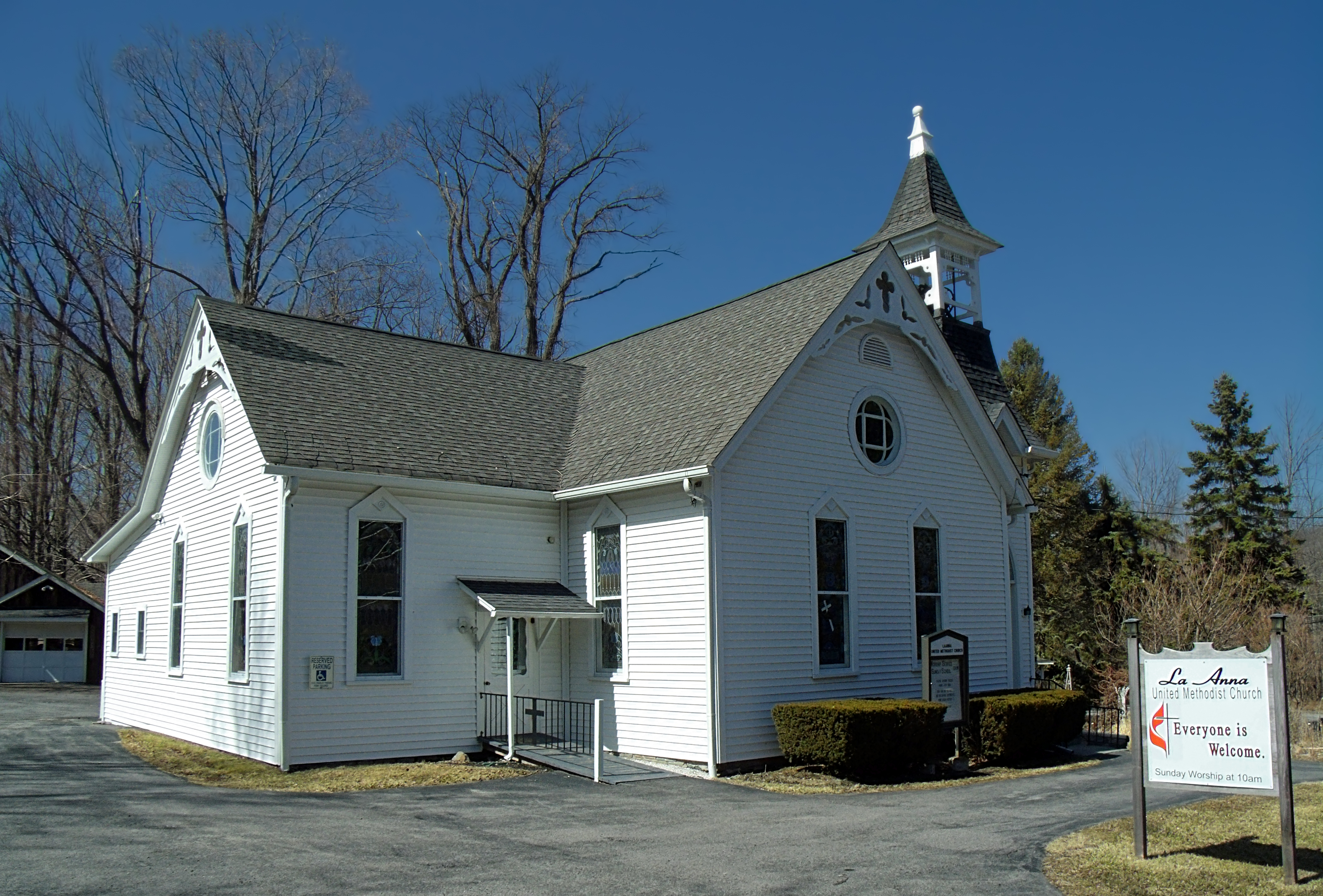
- La Anna United Methodist Church in the township

- Logo

- Location in Pike County and the state of Pennsylvania.

- Location of Pennsylvania in the United States
- Coordinates: 41°14′59″N 75°19′59″W
- Country: United States
- State: Pennsylvania
- County: Pike

Area
  - Total: 62.05 sq mi (160.70 km^{2})
  - Land: 59.86 sq mi (155.04 km^{2})
  - Water: 2.19 sq mi (5.66 km^{2})
- Elevation: 1,709 ft (521 m)

Population (2020)
  - Total: 3,453 ▼
  - Estimate (2021): 3,526
  - Density: 63.6/sq mi (24.55/km^{2})
- Time zone: UTC-5 (EST)
  - Summer (DST): UTC-4 (EDT)
- Area code: 570
- FIPS code: 42-103-30976
- Website: greenetownship.org

Greene Township is a township in Pike County, Pennsylvania, United States. The population was 3,453 at the 2020 census.

== Geography ==
According to the United States Census Bureau, the township has a total area of 62.1 square miles (161 km^{2}), of which 59.9 square miles (155 km^{2}) is land and 2.2 square miles (5.7 km^{2}) (3.54%) is water.

== Communities ==
The following villages are located in Greene Township:

- Greentown
- Hemlock Grove
- La Anna
- Ledgedale (also called Ledgerdale)
- Panther
- Roemersville

== Demographics ==
Historical population
Census	Pop.	Note	%±
2010	3,956		—
2020	3,453		−12.7%
2021 (est.)	3,526		2.1%
U.S. Decennial Census

As of the census of 2010, there were 3,956 people, 1,629 households, and 1,153 families residing in the township. The population density was 66 inhabitants per square mile (25/km^{2}). There were 3,242 housing units at an average density of 54.1 per square mile (20.9/km^{2}). The racial makeup of the township was 96% White, 1% African American, 0.4% Native American, 0.3% Asian, 0.7% from other races, and 1.6% from two or more races. Hispanic or Latino of any race were 3.9% of the population.

There were 1,629 households, out of which 25.7% had children under the age of 18 living with them, 54.8% were married couples living together, 10.9% had a female householder with no husband present, 5% had a male householder with no wife present, and 29.2% were non-families. 24.6% of all households were made up of individuals, and 10.7% had someone living alone who was 65 years of age or older. The average household size was 2.42 and the average family size was 2.85.

In the township the population was spread out, with 21.4% under the age of 18, 59.6% from 18 to 64, and 19% who were 65 years of age or older. The median age was 46.4 years.

The median income for a household in the township was $33,962, and the median income for a family was $41,571. Males had a median income of $39,417 versus $22,931 for females. The per capita income for the township was $20,253. About 5.0% of families and 8.7% of the population were below the poverty line, including 7.3% of those under age 18 and 5.9% of those age 65 or over.
