= Pennsylvania Route 590 =

State highway in Pennsylvania, US

Pennsylvania Route 590
- PA 590 highlighted in red

Route information
- Maintained by PennDOT
- Length: 45.064 mi (72.523 km)
- Existed: 1928–present

Major junctions
- West end: PA 435 in Elmhurst Township
- PA 690 in Salem Township; PA 348 in Salem Township; PA 191 / PA 196 in Salem Township; US 6 from Palmyra Township to Hawley
- East end: PA 434 in Lackawaxen Township

Location
- Country: United States
- State: Pennsylvania
- Counties: Lackawanna, Wayne, Pike

Highway system
- Pennsylvania State Route System; Interstate; US; State; Scenic; Legislative
← PA 588	→ PA 591

Pennsylvania Route 590 (PA 590) is a 45.0-mile-long (72.4 km) state highway located in Lackawanna, Wayne, and Pike counties in Pennsylvania. The western terminus is at PA 435 in Elmhurst Township. The eastern terminus is at PA 434 in the community of Greeley in Lackawaxen Township. PA 590 is mostly a two-lane road that runs through rural areas in Northeastern Pennsylvania. The route serves the communities of Hamlin, Hawley, and Lackawaxen and passes to the north of Lake Wallenpaupack. PA 590 has intersections with PA 690 and PA 348 in Hollisterville, PA 191/PA 196 in Hamlin, and U.S. Route 6 (US 6) in Hawley.

The section of PA 590 between PA 348 and US 6 was built as the Cobb road in 1769 and became a turnpike called the Luzerne and Wayne Turnpike in 1827. To the west of Lackawaxen, the route follows the corridor of the former Delaware and Hudson Canal that was completed in the 1820s. PA 590 was designated in 1928 between US 611 (now PA 435) in Elmhurst and PA 37/PA 237 in Lackawaxen, while PA 37 ran along the road between Lackawaxen and Greeley. The PA 37 designation was removed from this stretch of road in the 1940s. In the 1960s, PA 590 was extended from Lackawaxen to PA 434 in Greeley.

== Route description ==
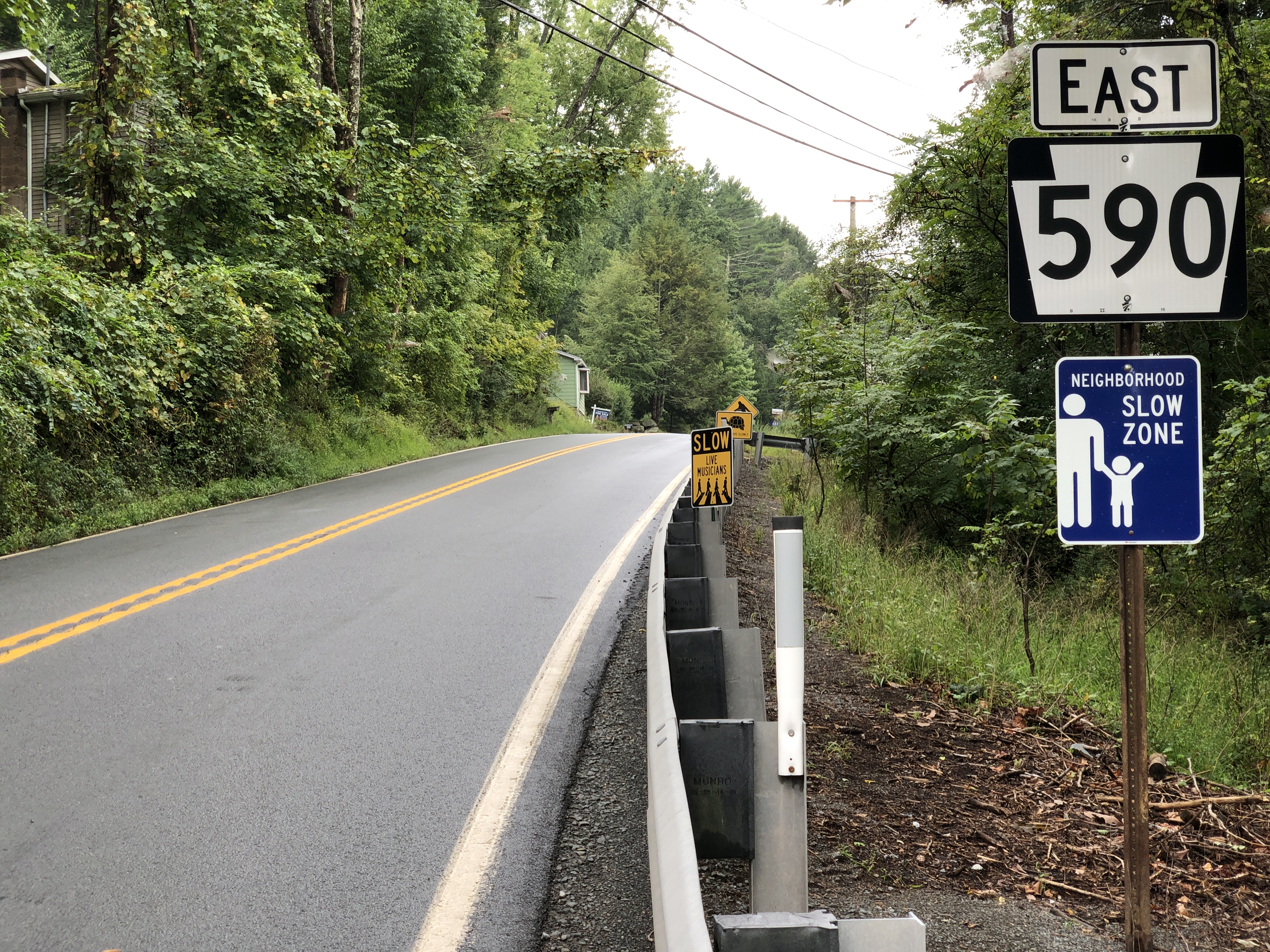
PA 590 eastbound in Lackawaxen

PA 590 begins at an intersection with PA 435 in Elmhurst Township, Lackawanna County, heading southeast on a two-lane undivided road. The route runs through forested areas with some homes, curving east into Roaring Brook Township and passing to the north of Elmhurst Reservoir. The road heads northeast through more forests with some fields and residences, crossing into Madison Township and passing to the northwest of Curtis Reservoir on Hamlin Road as it continues into Jefferson Township. PA 590 runs through more rural areas and passes over I-84, curving to the east and heading through Drinker before turning to the south.

PA 590 enters Salem Township in Wayne County and becomes Hamlin Highway, continuing northeast through wooded areas with some homes and intersecting the eastern terminus of PA 690 in Hollisterville. The road runs through more rural areas of residences and comes to a junction with the eastern terminus of PA 348. At this point, the route turns to the east and heads into agricultural areas with some woods and residential and commercial development. PA 590 gains a center left-turn lane and passes near more businesses as it comes to an intersection with PA 191/PA 196 in Hamlin. The road loses the center left-turn lane past this intersection and continues into forested areas before heading through more woodland with some farm fields and homes, turning east-northeast near Peetona. The route curves more to the east as it heads through Arlington. PA 590 heads to the northeast again as it enters Paupack Township and becomes Purdytown Turnpike. The road heads through forested areas with some farmland and residences, passing through Lakeville. The route turns east and heads through Uswick entering dense forests. PA 590 turns northeast and passes to the northwest of Lake Wallenpaupack. The road heads into wooded areas of residential development and crosses into Palmyra Township, turning to the southeast. The route runs through more forests to the north of the lake and passes north of a scenic overlook before it heads east to an intersection with US 6 in Wilsonville.

Here, PA 590 turns north for a concurrency with US 6 on Welwood Avenue, heading northeast through some development as a three-lane road with a center left-turn lane. The road loses the turn lane and heads through wooded areas before crossing into the borough of Hawley. US 6/PA 590 becomes Bellemonte Avenue and turns northwest into residential areas, heading to the west and becoming Spring Street. The two routes turn north onto Main Avenue and pass through the commercial downtown of Hawley, crossing the Middle Creek before heading across the Stourbridge Railroad and the Lackawaxen River. The road passes more businesses before coming to an intersection where US 6 heads to the west and PA 590 heads southeast on Hudson Street. The route heads through wooded areas with some homes to the northeast of the Lackawaxen River. The road turns north-northeast away from the river and heads back into Palmyra Township, turning to the east.

PA 590 continues into Lackawaxen Township in Pike County and becomes an unnamed road, heading into forested areas and turning north before making a turn to the southeast. The road winds through more forests with some residential developments, heading northeast before a turn to the east. The route continues through rural areas, heading northeast briefly before turning to the southeast, passing through Bohemia. PA 590 runs through more forests with some homes and comes to the community of Rowland, where it turns northeast and runs to the northwest of the Lackawaxen River. The road winds east through forests to the north of the river, heading northeast before turning southeast to cross the Lackawaxen River. The route heads into rural areas of development a short distance to the west of the Southern Tier Line, which is owned by Norfolk Southern and operated by the Central New York Railroad. The roadway crosses the Stourbridge Railroad again and enters the community of Lackawaxen. PA 590 turns southwest and continues south into dense forests. The road continues south and heads through more forests with some homes. PA 590 comes to its eastern terminus at an intersection with PA 434 in Greeley, where the road becomes a part of PA 434.

== History ==
Between PA 348 and US 6, PA 590 follows the alignment of the Cobb road, a narrow road which connected the Province of New York to the Wyoming Valley that was constructed in 1769. The Cobb road was also called the old Army road and was used by General John Sullivan and his forces in 1779 during the American Revolutionary War on their expedition from Easton to the Wyoming Valley and Western New York. A turnpike known as the Luzerne and Wayne Turnpike was chartered on February 24, 1820, to run from Providence Township in Luzerne County (now a part of Scranton in Lackawanna County) east to the Milford and Owego Turnpike at the Wallenpaupack Creek in Wayne County. The turnpike was built in 1826 and 1827 along the old Army road. A portion of PA 590 to the west of Lackawaxen follows the abandoned towpath and bed of the Delaware and Hudson Canal, a canal that was built in the 1820s to transport anthracite coal from Carbondale, Pennsylvania, east to the Hudson River in Kingston, New York. The canal is designated a National Historic Landmark.

When Pennsylvania legislated routes in 1911, what is now PA 590 was designated as Legislative Route 172 between Elmhurst and Hamlin and as Legislative Route 255 between Hawley and Lackawaxen. PA 590 was designated in 1928 to run from US 611 (now PA 435) in Elmhurst east to PA 37/PA 237 in Lackawaxen while the current alignment between Lackawaxen and Greeley was designated as part of PA 37. At this time, PA 590 was paved between US 611 and PA 690 and for a short distance to the west of US 6. By 1930, a portion of the route west of Lackawaxen was paved while the route was under construction between Hollisterville and PA 90 (now PA 191/PA 196) in Hamlin, between Rowland and west of Lackawaxen, and into Lackawaxen. In addition, PA 37 was under construction between Lackawaxen and Greeley. The entire length of PA 590 was paved in the 1930s. In the 1940s, PA 37 was realigned off the road between Lackawaxen and Greeley, leaving it unnumbered, while PA 237 was decommissioned; the eastern terminus of PA 590 remained in Lackawaxen. In the 1960s, PA 590 was extended south to end at PA 434 (which replaced PA 37) in Greeley.

== Major intersections ==
County	Location	mi	km	Destinations	Notes
Lackawanna	Elmhurst Township	0.000	0.000	PA 435	Western terminus
Wayne	Salem Township	7.256	11.677	PA 690 west (Hollisterville Road) – Madisonville	Eastern terminus of PA 690
Wayne	Salem Township	8.251	13.279	PA 348 west (Mount Cobb Highway) to I-81 / I-84 – Mount Cobb	Eastern terminus of PA 348
Wayne	Salem Township	9.776	15.733	PA 191 / PA 196 (Easton Turnpike) to I-84 – Honesdale, Newfoundland	
Wayne	Palmyra Township	23.662	38.080	US 6 east (Lake Wallenpaupack Road) – Milford	Western end of US 6 concurrency
Wayne	Hawley	25.610	41.215	US 6 west (Hudson Street) – Honesdale	Eastern end of US 6 concurrency
Pike	Lackawaxen Township	45.064	72.523	PA 434	Eastern terminus
1.000 mi = 1.609 km; 1.000 km = 0.621 mi: Concurrency terminus
