= Pennsylvania Route 348 =

State highway in Pennsylvania, US

Pennsylvania Route 348

Route information
- Maintained by PennDOT
- Length: 7.211 mi (11.605 km)
- Existed: 1936–present

Major junctions
- West end: PA 435 near Elmhurst
- PA 247 near Elmhurst
- East end: PA 590 near Hollisterville

Location
- Country: United States
- State: Pennsylvania
- Counties: Lackawanna, Wayne

Highway system
- Pennsylvania State Route System; Interstate; US; State; Scenic; Legislative
← PA 347	→ PA 349

Pennsylvania Route 348 (PA 348) is a 7.21-mile-long (11.60 km) state highway located in Lackawanna and Wayne counties in Pennsylvania. The western terminus is at PA 435 near Elmhurst. The eastern terminus is at PA 590 near Hollisterville. PA 348 is a two-lane undivided road that runs through rural areas east of Scranton. From its beginning, the route runs a short distance to the north of Interstate 84 (I-84) before reaching an intersection with PA 247 in Mount Cobb. After this, PA 348 heads farther north from I-84 and leaves Lackawanna County for Wayne County, where it ends at PA 590.

PA 348 follows the alignment of the Cobb road which was built in 1769 to connect the Wyoming Valley to points east; this road was used during the Sullivan Expedition in 1779. The Cobb road became a turnpike called the Luzerne and Wayne Turnpike that was completed in 1827, connecting Providence Township in Luzerne County (now Scranton in Lackawanna County) and Wayne County. PA 348 was designated between U.S. Route 611 (US 611, now PA 435) north of Elmhurst and PA 590 north of Hollisterville in the 1930s.

== Route description ==
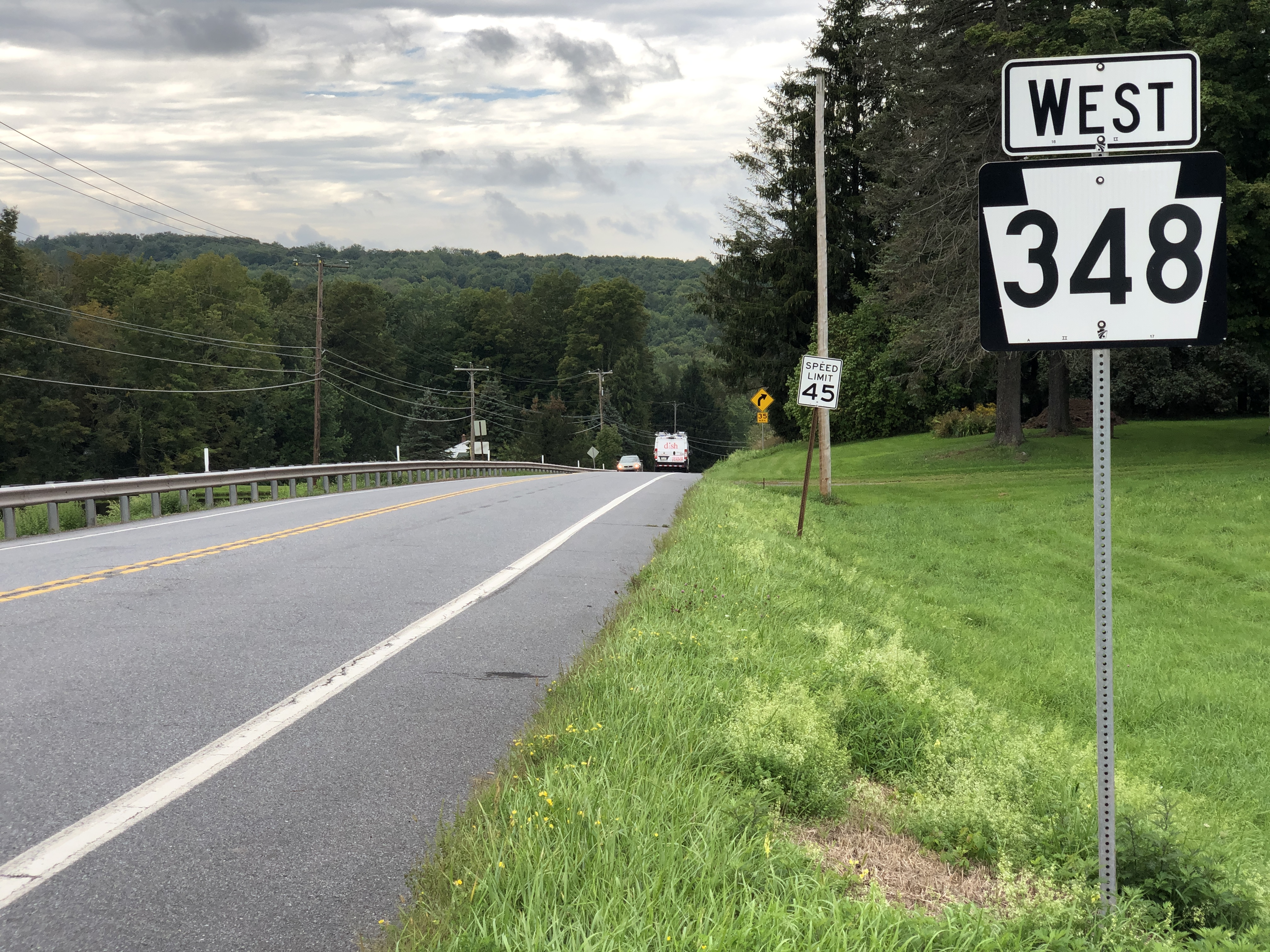
PA 348 westbound after its eastern terminus north of the hamlet of Hollisterville at PA 590

PA 348 begins at an intersection with the southbound lanes of the PA 435 expressway in Roaring Brook Township. The roadway passes under the northbound lanes of PA 435 and comes to a ramp providing access to northbound PA 435. The route progresses northeastward as the Luzerne and Wayne County Pike through woodlands just north of I-84. The two-lane road parallels the nearby interstate into a small residential area along the north side of the highway. Both roads make a curve to the east and enter downtown Mount Cobb, a neighborhood of Jefferson Township.

Through Mount Cobb, PA 348 intersects with PA 247 and changes names to Mount Cobb Road. Crossing through several local residences and businesses, PA 348 curves eastward out of Mount Cobb, following a stretch of residences into the hamlet of Elmdale. In Elmdale, the route crosses over Wallenpaupack Creek and turns to the southeast. After an intersection with Old Mill Road, PA 348 crosses from Lackawanna County into Wayne County and changes names to the Mount Cobb Highway. A short distance over the county line, PA 348 passes north of the hamlet of Hollisterville and ends at a merge with PA 590, which continues on the right-of-way as the Hamlin Highway.

== History ==
PA 348 follows the alignment of the Cobb road, a narrow road which connected the Province of New York to the Wyoming Valley that was constructed in 1769. The Cobb road was also called the old Army road and was used by General John Sullivan and his forces in 1779 during the American Revolutionary War on their expedition from Easton to the Wyoming Valley and Western New York. A turnpike known as the Luzerne and Wayne Turnpike was chartered on February 24, 1820 to run from Providence Township in Luzerne County (now a part of Scranton in Lackawanna County) east to the Milford and Owego Turnpike at the Wallenpaupack Creek in Wayne County. The turnpike was built in 1826 and 1827 along the old Army road.

When Pennsylvania first legislated routes in 1911, the current alignment of PA 348 was not given a number. By 1930, the road remained unnumbered and was paved in Lackawanna County and unpaved in Wayne County. PA 348 was designated in the 1930s to run from US 611 (now PA 435) north of Elmhurst east to PA 590 north of Hollisterville. At this time, the entire length of the route was paved. In 1958, the western terminus at US 611 was modified to its current configuration, with an overpass carrying northbound US 611 over PA 348 and a ramp from PA 348 to northbound US 611, as part of widening that section of US 611 into a divided highway.

== Major intersections ==
County	Location	mi	km	Destinations	Notes
Lackawanna	Roaring Brook Township	0.000	0.000	PA 435 south – Moscow	Western terminus
Lackawanna	Roaring Brook Township	0.034	0.055	PA 435 north to I-81 – Scranton	Interchange
Lackawanna	Jefferson Township	2.973	4.785	PA 247 to I-84	
Wayne	Salem Township	7.211	11.605	PA 590 (Hamlin Highway)	Eastern terminus
1.000 mi = 1.609 km; 1.000 km = 0.621 mi
