= Pennsylvania Route 690 =

State highway in Pennsylvania, US

Pennsylvania Route 690
- PA 690 in red, and PA 690 Truck in blue

Route information
- Maintained by PennDOT
- Length: 12.533 mi (20.170 km)

Major junctions
- West end: PA 502 in Spring Brook Township
- PA 307 in Spring Brook Township. I-380 in Moscow; PA 435 in Moscow
- East end: PA 590 in Salem Township

Location
- Country: United States
- State: Pennsylvania
- Counties: Lackawanna, Wayne

Highway system
- Pennsylvania State Route System; Interstate; US; State; Scenic; Legislative
← PA 683	→ PA 692

Pennsylvania Route 690 (PA 690) is a 12.53-mile-long (20.17 km) state highway located in Lackawanna and Wayne counties in Pennsylvania. The western terminus is at PA 502 in Spring Brook Township. The eastern terminus is at PA 590 in Salem Township. The route is a two-lane undivided road running through rural and some developed areas southeast of Scranton. From the western terminus, the route crosses PA 307 and has a partial interchange with Interstate 380 (I-380) before reaching Moscow, where it forms a brief concurrency with PA 435. From Moscow, PA 690 continues northeast to its terminus at PA 590 in Hollisterville. PA 690 was designated in 1928 between U.S. Route 611 (US 611, now PA 435) in Moscow and PA 590 in Hollisterville. The route was extended west to PA 502 in the 1930s.

== Route description ==
PA 690 begins at an intersection with PA 502 in the Spring Brook hamlet section of Spring Brook Township just north of the Watres Reservoir. PA 690 heads northward from PA 502, passing some local residents and nearby Benjamin Pond before beginning to wind through the woodlands north of the hamlet. After the intersection with Thomas Road, the highway progresses eastward for a short distance, turning northeastward into a small resident segment near Maple Lake. After intersecting with Maple Lake Road, PA 690 turns eastward into the hamlet of Maple Lake. The hamlet is residential, as the road becomes the main street, intersecting with PA 307. There, PA 690 turns northward out of Maple Lake, winding into Exit 22 of I-380 (a southbound only exit). After I-380, PA 690 makes a short curve to the northeast before entering the borough of Moscow, where it gains the name of Church Street.

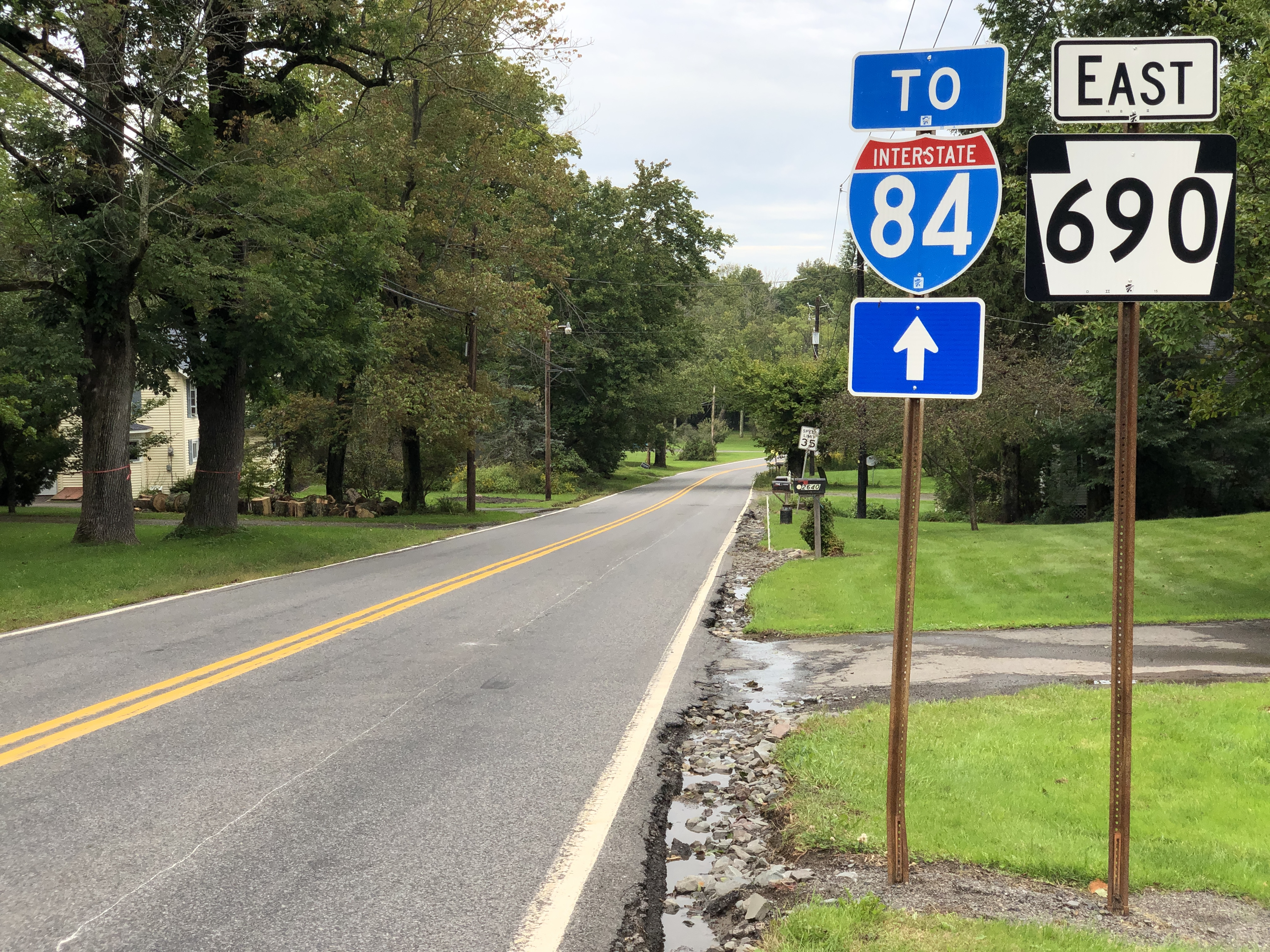
PA 690 heading eastward through Madisonville with signage for I-84

Heading through Moscow, PA 690 is primarily residential, passing the local high school and into downtown, where commercial businesses begin to appear. In downtown Moscow, the highway intersects with PA 435 (Main Street) and turns south onto a concurrency on South Main Street. Paralleling the tracks of the Delaware-Lackawanna Railroad, PA 690 soon splits off under the tracks. Turning northward after the underpass, PA 690 heads northward on Market Street, passing the former Moscow train station. The stretch along Market Street is mainly commercial, before the designation turns off Market at the intersection with Brook Street. Along Brook Street, the route is primarily residential. Before crossing the borough line, PA 690 remains known as Brook Street, but after the borough line, the route becomes woodlands. Soon changing names to Madisonville Road, PA 690 passes a residential complex and enters Madisonville, a rural hamlet. After the intersection with Reservoir Road, the highway turns from the northeast and curves into the hamlet of Aberdeen.

After crossing through Aberdeen, PA 690 turns northeastward into the hamlet of Quicktown, where the highway crosses under I-84, but does not intersect with it. Just after crossing under I-84, the route crosses the county line into Wayne County and gains the name Hollisterville Road. From there, PA 690 heads northeast away from I-84 in rural settings until entering the hamlet of Hollisterville. There, the route passes several residences before intersecting with PA 590 (Hamlin Highway). The right-of-way merges into PA 590 and the designation of PA 690 ends.

== History ==
When Pennsylvania first legislated routes in 1911, what is now PA 690 was not given a number. PA 690 was designated in 1928 to run from US 611 (now PA 435) in Moscow northeast to PA 590 in Hollisterville along an unpaved road. By 1930, the road between PA 502 and US 611 in Moscow was an unnumbered, unpaved road. PA 690 was extended west from Moscow to PA 502 in the 1930s. At this time, the entire length of the route was paved between PA 502 and the border of Lackawanna and Wayne counties. The section of PA 690 between the county line and PA 590 was paved in the 1940s.

== Major intersections ==
County	Location	mi	km	Destinations	Notes
Lackawanna	Spring Brook Township	0.000	0.000	PA 502 (Spring Brook Avenue)	Western terminus
Lackawanna	Spring Brook Township	3.324	5.349	PA 307 (Scranton-Pocono Highway)	Hamlet of Maple Lake
Lackawanna	Moscow	3.974– 3.988	6.396– 6.418	I-380 north to I-84 – Scranton	Exit 22 (I-380); northbound entrance to / southbound exit from I-380 only
Lackawanna	Moscow	6.089	9.799	PA 435 north (Main Street) – Scranton	Western terminus of concurrency with PA 435
Lackawanna	Moscow	6.157	9.909	PA 435 south (South Main Street) – Stroudsburg	Eastern terminus of concurrency with PA 435
Wayne	Salem Township	12.533	20.170	PA 590 (Hamlin Highway) – Elmhurst, Hamlin	Hamlet of Hollisterville; eastern terminus
1.000 mi = 1.609 km; 1.000 km = 0.621 mi: Concurrency terminus; Incomplete access

== PA 690 Truck ==
Pennsylvania Route 690 Truck
- Location: Lackawanna County
- Length: 5.4 mi (8.7 km)
- Existed: 2013–present

Pennsylvania Route 690 Truck is a truck route that bypasses a weight-restricted bridge over the Van Brunt Creek near Moscow, on which trucks over 26 tons and combination loads over 40 tons are prohibited. The route follows PA 307, PA 502, and PA 435, and it was established in 2013.
