= Interstate 380 (Pennsylvania) =

Highway in Pennsylvania

Interstate 380
- I-380 highlighted in red

Route information
- Auxiliary route of I-80
- Maintained by PennDOT
- Length: 28.45 mi (45.79 km)
- NHS: Entire route

Major junctions
- South end: I-80 at the Tunkhannock–Jackson township line
- PA 940 in Tobyhanna Township; PA 423 in Coolbaugh Township; PA 611 in Coolbaugh Township; PA 435 / PA 507 in Coolbaugh Township; PA 307 in Covington Township; PA 690 in Moscow; I-84 in Roaring Brook Township; PA 435 in Dunmore
- North end: I-81 / I-84 / US 6 in Dunmore

Location
- Country: United States
- State: Pennsylvania
- Counties: Monroe, Wayne, Lackawanna

Highway system
- Interstate Highway System; Main; Auxiliary; Suffixed; Business; Future; Pennsylvania State Route System; Interstate; US; State; Scenic; Legislative
← PA 378	→ PA 380
← PA 81	→ PA 82

Interstate 380 (I-380) is an auxiliary Interstate Highway in Northeastern Pennsylvania that connects I-80 with I-81 and I-84. The southern terminus is in Tunkhannock Township at a junction with I-80; the northern terminus of I-380 is at I-81 and U.S. Route 6 (US 6) in Dunmore. The entire length of the highway is 28.45 miles (45.79 km).

== Route description ==
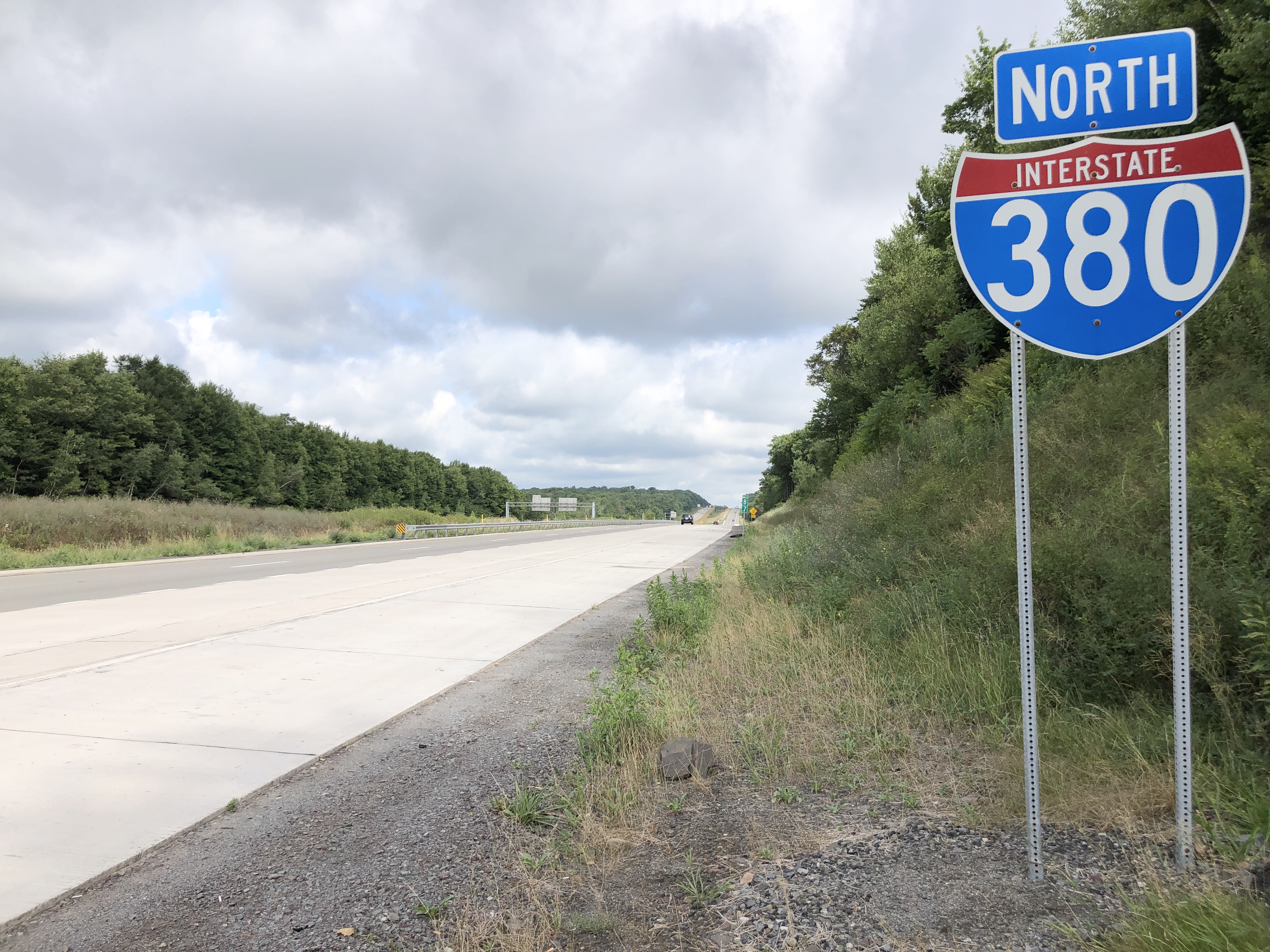
I-380 northbound past PA 611 in Coolbaugh Township

I-380 begins at an interchange with I-80 in the northeastern corner of Tunkhannock Township in Monroe County, heading north as a four-lane freeway. The road soon crosses into Tobyhanna Township and runs through forested areas in the Pocono Mountains with nearby development, passing west of Kalahari Resorts and Conventions Poconos. The highway comes to an interchange with Pennsylvania Route 940 (PA 940) to the west of Pocono Summit. I-380 continues north and crosses into Coolbaugh Township, where it curves northwest and runs through dense forests. The road passes through part of Pennsylvania State Game Lands Number 127 before it comes to a northbound exit and southbound entrance at PA 423 near Tobyhanna. A short distance later, the highway comes to a southbound exit and northbound entrance serving the northern terminus of PA 611. Following this interchange, I-380 passes to the southwest of Tobyhanna Army Depot before it runs along the border between Pennsylvania State Game Lands Number 127 to the southwest and Gouldsboro State Park to the northeast. Farther northwest, the highway comes to a diamond interchange with the southern termini of PA 435 and PA 507 near Gouldsboro.

Immediately after the PA 435/PA 507 interchange, I-380 passes through a small corner of Lehigh Township in Wayne County before it crosses the Lehigh River into Clifton Township in Lackawanna County. The highway continues through forested areas and curves to the north, passing a northbound weigh station and crossing into Covington Township. The freeway runs past a southbound weigh station and bends northwest again. The route curves back to the north into a mix of fields and woods and reaches a diamond interchange with PA 307. Past this interchange, I-380 curves north into the borough of Moscow and coming to a southbound exit and northbound entrance at PA 690. The roadway curves northwest and passes through a corner of Spring Brook Township before entering Roaring Brook Township, where it runs through forests with nearby development and comes to an interchange with I-84.

At this point, I-84 and I-380 become concurrent, with the freeway using I-84's exit numbers and mileposts. The two routes continue north through forested areas in the Moosic Mountains, entering the borough of Dunmore and coming to a bridge over Roaring Brook and a Delaware-Lackawanna Railroad line. After this bridge, the highway curves northwest and comes to a southbound exit and northbound entrance with the northern terminus of PA 435. The freeway widens to six lanes and winds through the mountains before it comes to an interchange with Tigue Street, at which point it runs past commercial development. A short distance later, I-84 and I-380 both come to their termini at an interchange with I-81 and US 6, with the freeway merging onto northbound I-81/westbound US 6.

== History ==
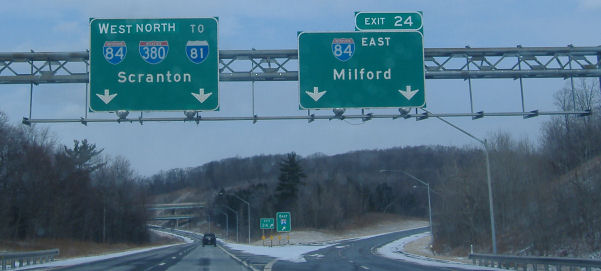
I-380 northbound merge with I-84 in Roaring Brook Township, southeast of Scranton

Prior to receiving its current designation, the planned corridor of I-380 had several other designations. When the initial numbers for the Interstate Highway System were assigned in 1957, the Scranton–New York route (including the current I-380) was designated I-82. This changed the next year, and the Scranton–Stroudsburg connection became I-81S, a spur of I-81.

In 1961, construction began on a short section of the route between what is now exit 2 for PA 435 (then part of US 611) and its northern terminus at I-81 outside of Scranton. This section was opened in 1962 as part of US 611. In 1964, the designation of the proposed road was changed again to I-81E and construction began on the section between the southern terminus at I-80 and exit 3 for PA 940 near Pocono Manor. This section was built at the same time as the connecting section of I-80 and both opened in 1965.

In December 1966, it was announced bids were to occur soon to build a portion of the highway between Pocono Manor in Tobyhanna Township and Coolbaugh Township. On December 30, 1966, bids were made to build a section of I-81E in Coolbaugh and Tobyhanna townships. In February 1967, construction was planned for a section of highway in Coolbaugh Township between Tobyhanna and the border with Lackawanna County. On April 21, 1967, the state announced bidding would take place to build a section of I-81E in Monroe County on May 12. The state announced on June 9, 1967, that bidding would take place on June 23 to construct a section of the highway in Covington Township. The section of I-81E between the PA 940 interchange in Pocono Manor and US 611/PA 423 at Tobyhanna was projected to open in late 1968, and construction of the highway between Tobyhanna and Elmhurst Township was underway by 1968.

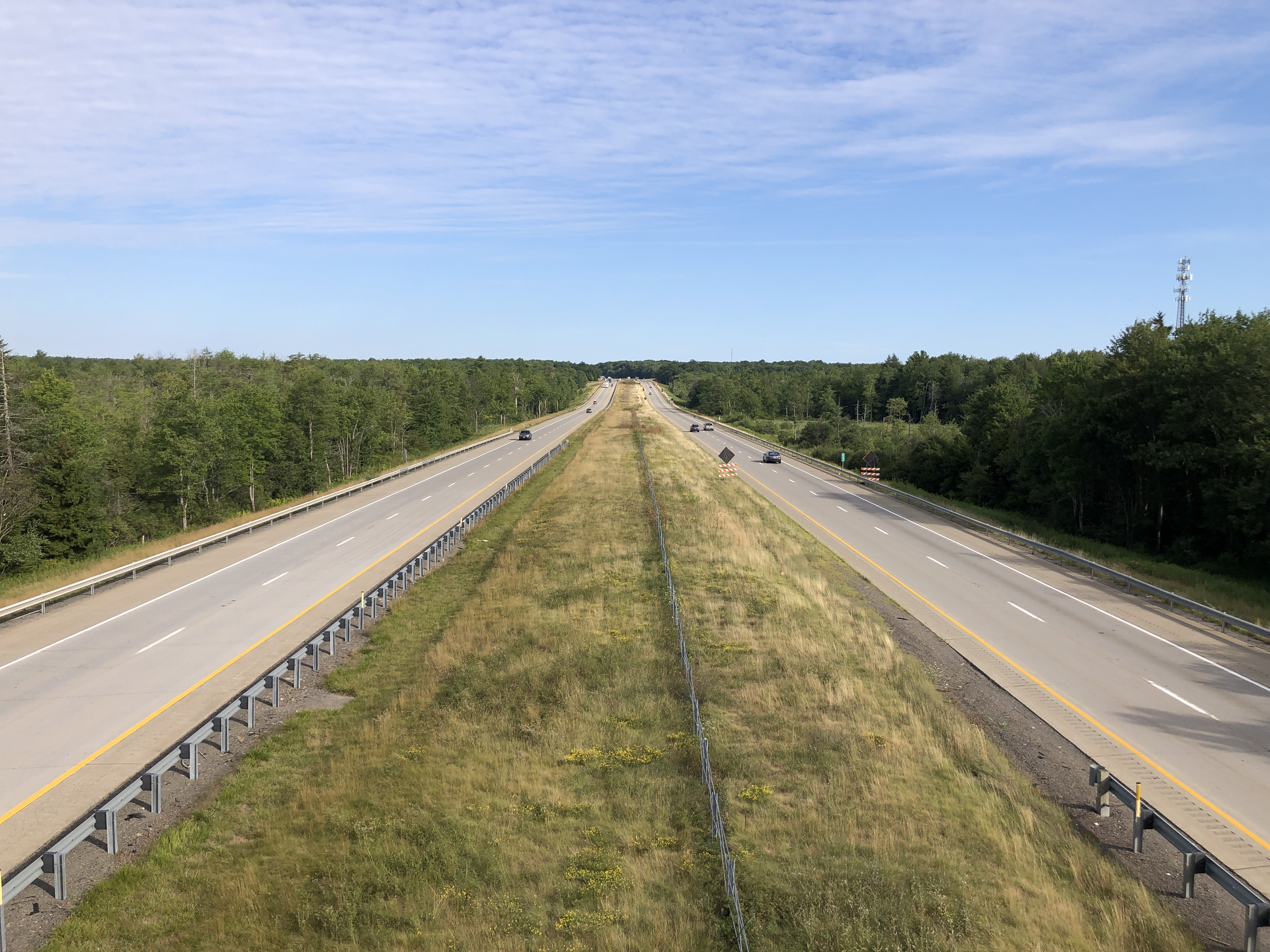
I-380 northbound at PA 423 in Coolbaugh Township

On November 21, 1969, the section of I-81E between PA 507 in Gouldsboro and PA 307 in Daleville opened to traffic. By 1970, the road between PA 307 in Daleville and US 611 southeast of Dunmore was under design.

In 1967, construction on the road was restarted on a 17-mile (27 km) southern section from PA 940 to PA 423 and PA 507 to the Dorantown Road overpass, and, in 1968, was expanded to the sections from PA 423 to PA 507 and the Dorantown Road overpass to PA 307. This section opened in 1970 with US 611 multiplexed onto the portion between exit 8 (now PA 611) and exit 13 (PA 507) adjacent to Gouldsboro State Park.

On June 20, 1972, the American Association of State Highway Officials (AASHO) approved renumbering I-81E as I-380, along with extending I-84 concurrent with I-380 from Elmhurst Township north to I-81. The renumbering was done in order to avoid the confusion of I-81E with the connecting I-80 and I-81 designations. The new I-380 designation and extended I-84 would take effect in mid-1973, with the new signs to be installed by June of that year. In 1973, the northern section was upgraded to Interstate standards. In 1974 and 1975, work commenced on the final sections from PA 307 to the Shutters Road underpass and Shutters Road to PA 435, respectively. This included an interchange with I-84, and was opened to traffic in 1976 as an east–west highway with mileage-based exit numbers. These mileage-based numbers were scrapped by 1977 and replaced with eight sequential numbers beginning in Scranton. Mileage-based exit numbers were revived in 2001 when the Pennsylvania Department of Transportation (PennDOT) renumbered its Interstate System exit numbers. I-380 was redesignated as a north–south highway so that its exit numbers would commence from I-80 in the south.

== Exit list ==
County	Location	mi	km	Old exit	New exit	Destinations	Notes
Monroe	Tunkhannock–Jackson township line	0.000	0.000		1	I-80 – Stroudsburg, Hazleton	Southern terminus; signed as exits 1A (east) and 1B (west); exit 293 on I-80
Monroe	Tobyhanna Township	2.531	4.073	8	3	PA 940 – Pocono Pines, Mount Pocono	
Monroe	Coolbaugh Township	7.630	12.279	7	8	PA 423 – Tobyhanna	Northbound exit and southbound entrance
Monroe	Coolbaugh Township	8.222	13.232	7	8	PA 611 south to PA 423 – Tobyhanna	Southbound exit and northbound entrance; northern terminus of PA 611
Monroe	Coolbaugh Township	13.043	20.991	6	13	PA 435 north / PA 507 north – Gouldsboro	Southern termini of PA 435 and PA 507
Wayne	No major junctions						
Lackawanna	Covington Township	19.530	31.430	5	20	PA 307 – Daleville, Moscow	
Lackawanna	Moscow	21.033	33.849	4	22	PA 690 – Moscow	Southbound exit and northbound entrance
Lackawanna	Roaring Brook Township	24.452	39.352	3	24 (NB) 4 (SB)	I-84 east – Milford	Southern end of I-84 concurrency
Lackawanna	Dunmore	26.281	42.295	2	2	PA 435 south – Elmhurst	Southbound exit and northbound entrance; northern terminus of PA 435
Lackawanna	Dunmore	27.293	43.924	1	1	Tigue Street	
Lackawanna	Dunmore	28.256	45.474			I-81 / US 6 to PA 347 – Wilkes-Barre, Binghamton, Carbondale I-84 ends	Northern terminus; western terminus of I-84; exit 187 on I-81
1.000 mi = 1.609 km; 1.000 km = 0.621 mi: Concurrency terminus; Incomplete access
