= Pennsylvania Route 307 =

State highway in Pennsylvania, US

Pennsylvania Route 307
- PA 307 highlighted in red

Route information
- Maintained by PennDOT and City of Scranton
- Length: 31.510 mi (50.710 km)
- Existed: November 1935–present

Major junctions
- South end: PA 435 in Covington Township
- PA 502 in Covington Township; I-380 in Covington Township; PA 690 in Spring Brook Township; I-81 in Scranton; US 11 in Scranton; President Biden Expressway in Scranton
- North end: PA 92 in Tunkhannock Township

Location
- Country: United States
- State: Pennsylvania
- Counties: Lackawanna, Wyoming

Highway system
- Pennsylvania State Route System; Interstate; US; State; Scenic; Legislative
← PA 305	→ PA 308

Pennsylvania Route 307 (PA 307) is a north–south route of the Pennsylvania Highway System that runs for 31 miles (50 km). The southern terminus is PA 435 in Covington Township and the northern terminus is PA 92 in Tunkhannock Township. The highway is called Scranton-Pocono Highway south of Scranton, connecting Scranton to the Pocono Mountains region.

== Route description ==
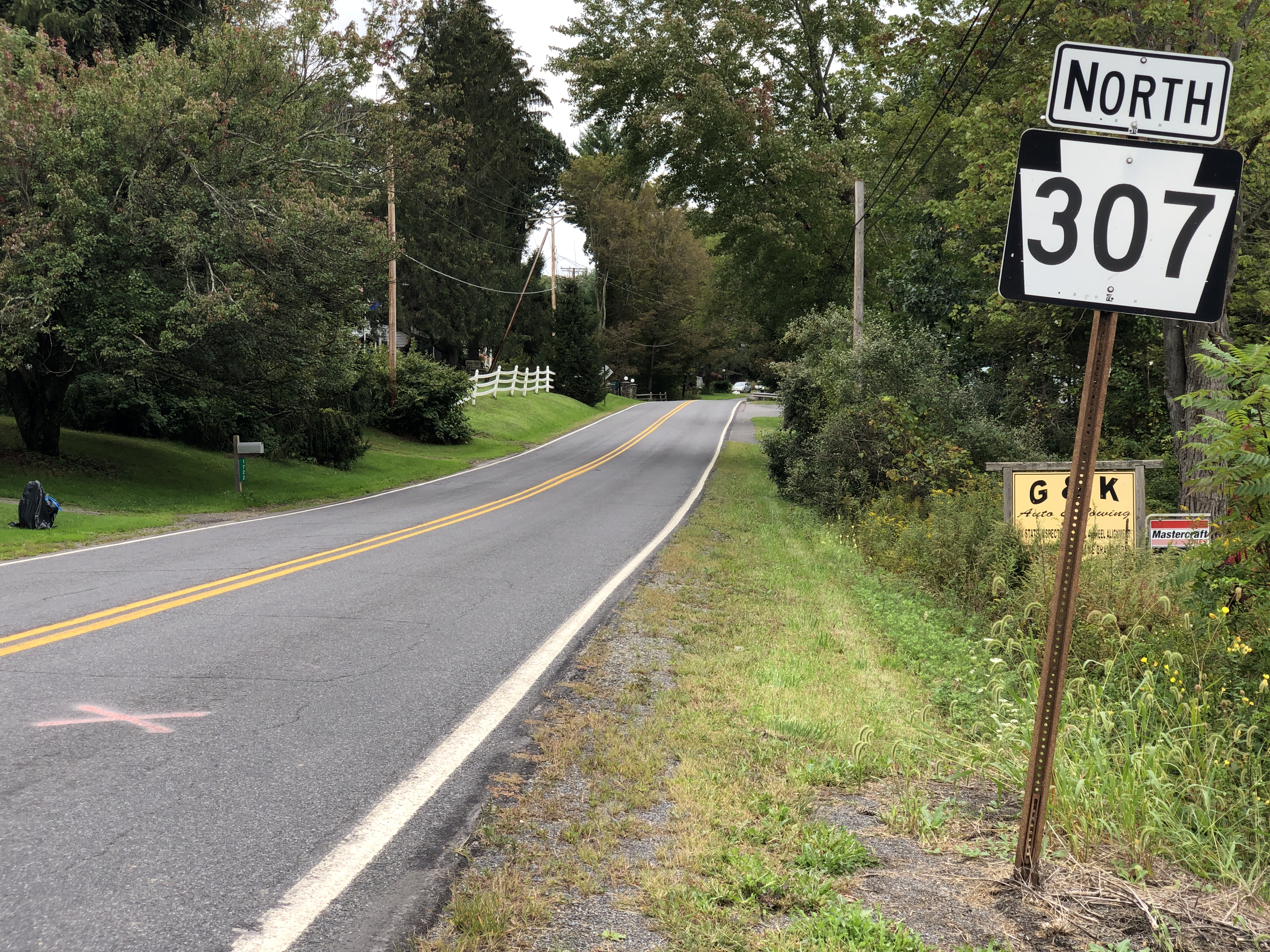
PA 307 northbound at Lower Mill City Road in Falls Township

PA 307 begins at a Y intersection with PA 435 in Covington Township in Lackawanna County, heading northwest on four-lane undivided Scranton-Pocono Highway. The road runs through forested areas with some homes, coming to an intersection with PA 502 in the community of Fells Corners. The route heads through more woodland with some fields and development and comes to an interchange with I-380 at exit 20. Past this interchange, PA 307 continues through forests with some homes and enters Spring Brook Township, where it crosses PA 690 at Quinlan Corners in the community of Maple Lake. The road continues through rural land and enters Roaring Brook Township, where it heads across the forested Moosic Mountains, passing east of Coon Hill. The route heads to the east of the Williams Bridge Reservoir and curves to the north, narrowing to a three-lane road with one northbound lane and two southbound lanes. The road heads into a section of the borough of Dunmore and turns to the northwest.

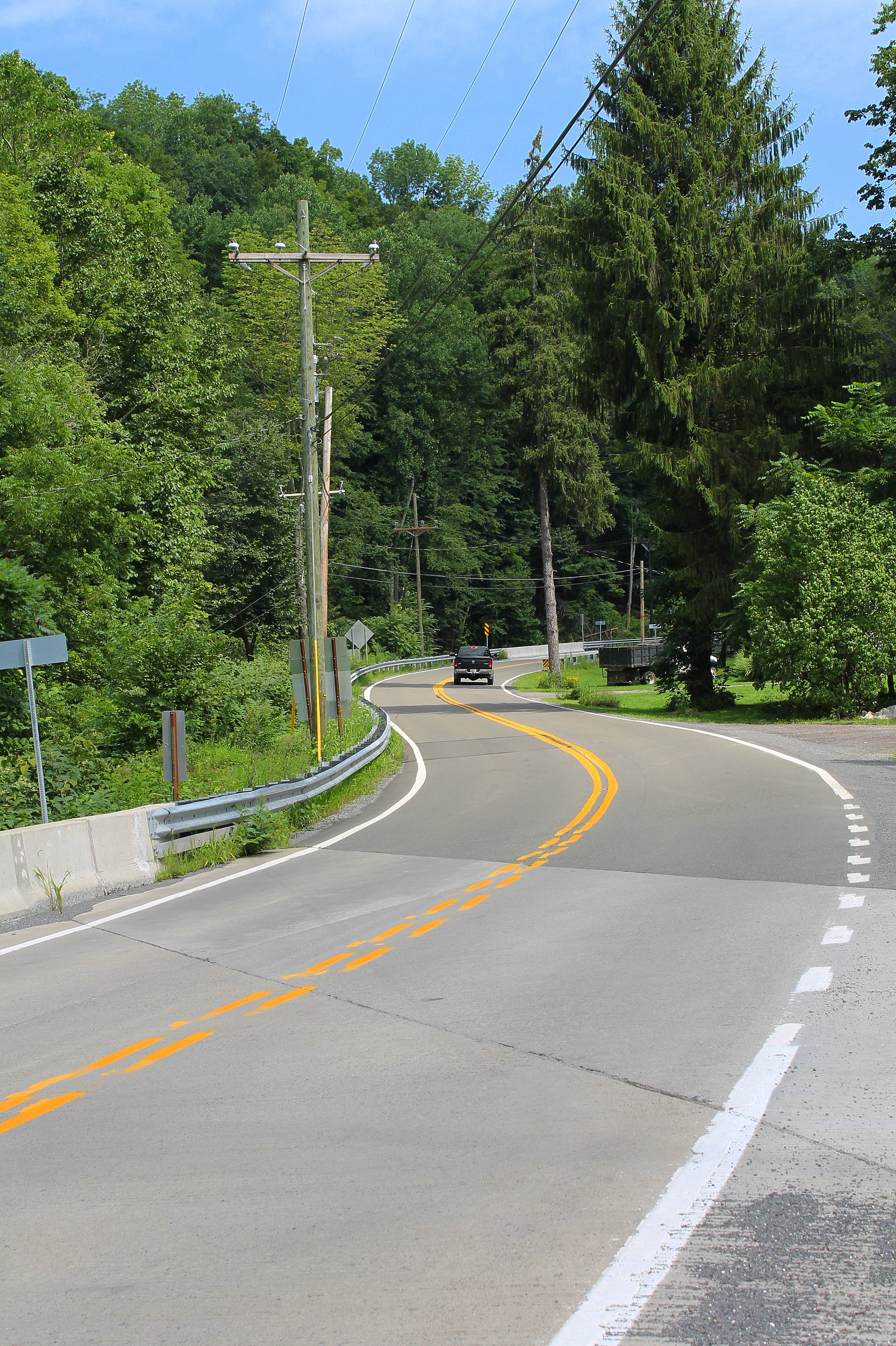
PA 307 near its northern terminus at PA 92 in Tunkhannock Township

PA 307 enters the city of Scranton and becomes two-lane Moosic Street, passing to the north of Lake Scranton and curving west. The road gains a center left-turn lane and runs west-southwest through wooded areas with homes. The route becomes a three-lane road with one northbound lane and two southbound lanes and bends to the west-northwest, running through woodland and passing under an abandoned railroad line. PA 307 widens into a four-lane divided highway and crosses I-81, with a ramp from southbound I-81 to PA 307; the remaining movements between PA 307 and I-81 and provided by Meadow Avenue and River Street. Past this interchange, the route runs past businesses and becomes a three-lane undivided road with two northbound lanes and one southbound lane, heading through residential areas. The road narrows to two lanes and continues northwest to an intersection with US 11.

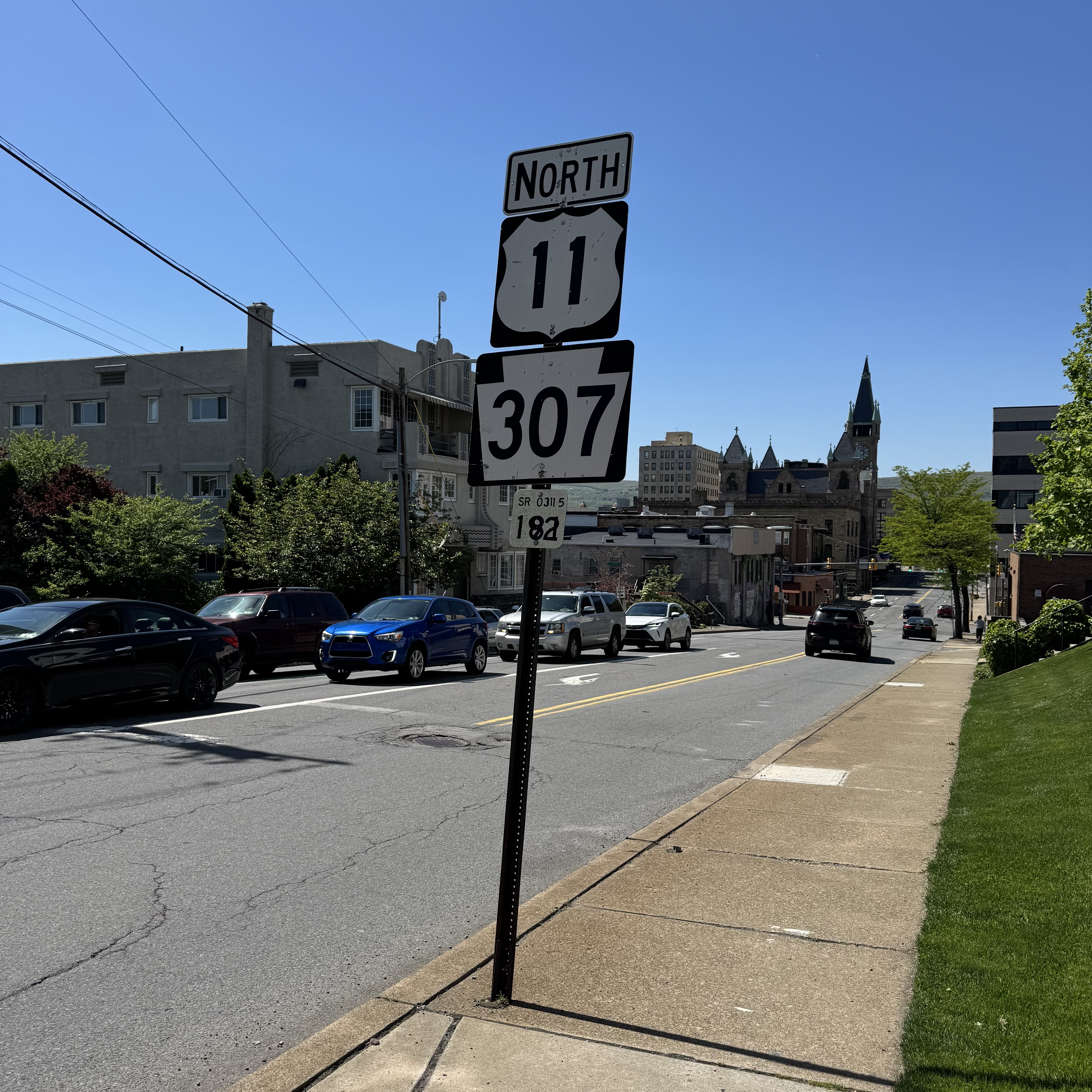
PA 307/US 11 northbound in downtown Scranton

At this point, PA 307 turns north to form a concurrency with US 11 on a divided road and comes to a southbound exit and northbound entrance with the western terminus of the President Biden Expressway. The two routes cross over Roaring Brook and the Electric City Trolley Museum line and head north as a six-lane divided highway, passing under a Delaware-Lackawanna Railroad line and curving northwest to enter downtown Scranton on Biden Street. US 11/PA 307 turns northeast onto city-maintained Jefferson Avenue, with one northbound lane and two southbound lanes. The road runs past downtown commercial development as it heads to the west of the University of Scranton campus. The two routes turn northwest onto state-maintained four-lane undivided Mulberry Street and runs past more businesses. Upon crossing Wyoming Avenue, the road becomes a divided highway and continues to an intersection with Mifflin Avenue. At this point, US 11/PA 307 becomes a four-lane freeway called the North Scranton Expressway and passes over a Delaware-Lackawanna Railroad line and the Lackawanna River.

The highway comes to an interchange with Providence Road that provides a connection to 7th Avenue and access to Memorial Staduum. From here, the freeway heads north near residential and commercial development and runs parallel to Norfolk Southern's Sunbury Line to the west, coming to a diamond interchange with North Main Avenue. The highway continues north-northeast through more of the city alongside the railroad tracks, bending to the north-northwest. PA 307 splits from the US 11 freeway at a diamond interchange by heading west on four-lane undivided Keyser Avenue, passing under the Norfolk Southern tracks. The route turns north onto Morgan Highway, a three-lane road with two northbound lanes and one southbound lane and runs through wooded areas with some commercial development, curving to the northwest.

PA 307 leaves Scranton for South Abington Township and traverses forested Bald Mountain, running a short distance to the northeast of the Pennsylvania Turnpike Northeast Extension (I-476). The road narrows to two lanes and continues through wooded areas with some homes, passing under I-476. The route continues through rural land and development and passes to the east of Summit Lake, bending to the north-northwest and heading into the borough of Clarks Summit. PA 307 curves west-southwest and reenters South Abington Township, running through a mix of fields and woods with some development. The road crosses into Newton Township and becomes Winola Road. The route passes to the north of Clarks Summit State Hospital and winds west through more rural land, passing to the north of the community of Schultzville.

PA 307 enters Falls Township in Wyoming County and becomes Roosevelt Highway, continuing to wind west through forests with some farm fields and homes. The road curves to the north and passes through the community of Mill City, crossing into Overfield Township. The route heads north through forests to the community of Lake Winola, where it turns west and runs through wooded areas of homes to the south of Lake Winola. PA 307 bends to the north and heads along the west side of the lake before it makes a sharp curve to the west. The road heads through forests with sparse development and enters Tunkhannock Township. PA 307 comes to its northern terminus at an intersection with PA 92 on the east bank of the Susquehanna River.

== History ==
At its inception in the late 1920s, PA 307 was little more than a short loop of its namesake, PA 7 (modern-day US 6), extending from that route west of Clarks Summit to its concurrency with the Lackawanna Trail in northern Scranton. At the time, PA 7, and later US 6, followed all of Winola Road out of Clarks Summit. PA 307 has since been extended twice. Its first extension occurred in 1935, when the Scranton-Pocono Highway was completed; to bridge the gap between the two highways, PA 307 formed a concurrency along US 11 through Scranton. In 1955, US 6 was rerouted onto a new alignment from Factoryville to Tunkhannock, and so PA 307 was extended west along this old alignment, terminating at the previously existing PA 92.

On March 18, 1965, truck driver Eugene P. Sesky was involved in a fatal crash on this highway, that would later be chronicled in the 1974 Harry Chapin song "30,000 Pounds of Bananas"

== Major intersections ==
County	Location	mi	km	Destinations	Notes
Lackawanna	Covington Township	0.000	0.000	PA 435 (Drinker Turnpike)	Southern terminus
Lackawanna	Covington Township	1.656	2.665	PA 502 (Daleville Highway)	
Lackawanna	Covington Township	2.649	4.263	I-380 to I-84 – Mount Pocono, Scranton	Exit 20 on I-380
Lackawanna	Spring Brook Township	3.962	6.376	PA 690 to I-84 / I-380	
Lackawanna	Scranton	11.354	18.272	Meadow Avenue to I-81	
Lackawanna	Scranton	12.001	19.314	US 11 south (Pittston Avenue)	Southern end of US 11 concurrency
Lackawanna	Scranton	12.012– 12.076	19.331– 19.434	To I-81 / I-84 east / I-380 south	Interchange; northbound entrance only (southbound exit via US 11); access via President Biden Expressway
Lackawanna	Scranton	12.973	20.878	Southern end of freeway section	
Lackawanna	Scranton	13.188	21.224	7th Avenue / Providence Road	
Lackawanna	Scranton	13.881	22.339	Main Avenue	Diamond interchange
Lackawanna	Scranton	15.263	24.563	US 11 north (North Scranton Expressway) to I-81	Northern end of US 11 concurrency
Lackawanna	Scranton	15.263	24.563	Northern end of freeway section	
Wyoming	Tunkhannock Township	31.510	50.710	PA 92 – Pittston, Tunkhannock	Northern terminus
1.000 mi = 1.609 km; 1.000 km = 0.621 mi: Concurrency terminus; Incomplete access
