= Interstate 84 in Pennsylvania =

Section of Interstate Highway in Pennsylvania, United States

Interstate 84
- Fallen Trooper Memorial Highway

Route information
- Maintained by PennDOT
- Length: 54.87 mi (88.30 km)
- NHS: Entire route

Major junctions
- West end: I-81 / I-380 / US 6 in Dunmore
- PA 435 in Dunmore; I-380 in Roaring Brook Township; PA 247 in Jefferson Township; PA 191 in Sterling Township; PA 507 in Greene Township; PA 390 in Palmyra Township; PA 402 in Blooming Grove Township; PA 739 in Dingman Township; US 6 near Milford; US 6 / US 209 in Matamoras
- East end: I-84 at the New York state line in Matamoras

Location
- Country: United States
- State: Pennsylvania
- Counties: Lackawanna, Wayne, Pike

Highway system
- Interstate Highway System; Main; Auxiliary; Suffixed; Business; Future; Pennsylvania State Route System; Interstate; US; State; Scenic; Legislative
← PA 83	→ PA 84

Interstate 84 (I-84) in Pennsylvania is the westernmost segment of the eastern I-84. Within Pennsylvania, it runs from I-81 in Dunmore east to the New York border near Matamoras.

== Route description ==
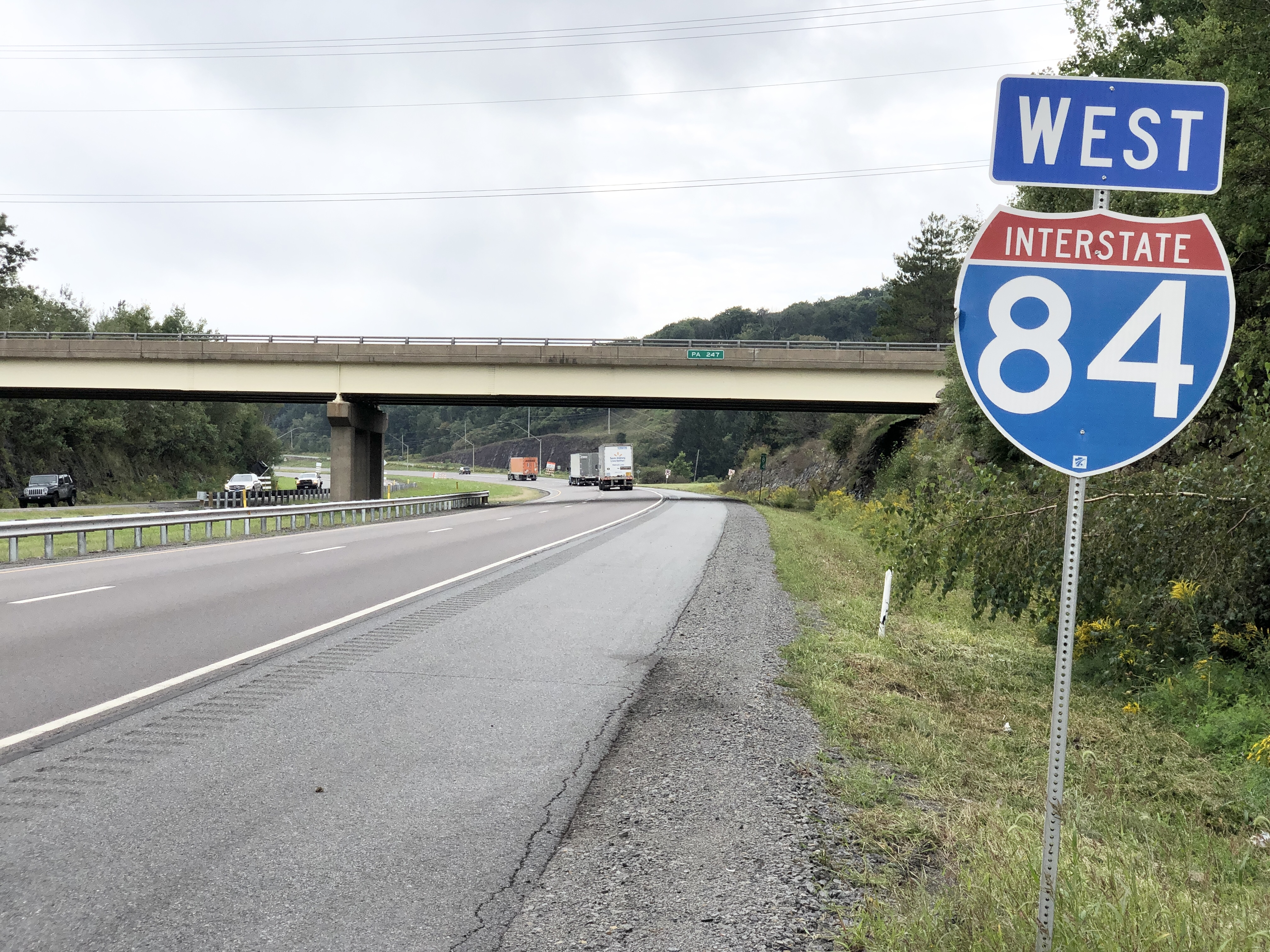
I-84 westbound at PA 247 in Jefferson Township

I-84 starts in Pennsylvania at I-81 in Dunmore, a suburb east of Scranton, along with the northern end of I-380. After two miles (3.2 km), I-84 splits from I-380, as the latter goes southeasterly through the Poconos and I-84 continues almost due east into Wayne and Pike counties.

This section of Pennsylvania is very lightly populated, and there are no major settlements on or near I-84, although it offers access to popular outdoor recreation areas such as Lake Wallenpaupack and Promised Land State Park. Its right-of-way is very wide, with a large median strip between the two carriageways as it passes through densely wooded country, except for the swampy areas in southern Wayne County. The only development along Pennsylvania's section of I-84 is where U.S. Route 6 (US 6) and US 209 start to parallel closely and form a commercial strip just south of Matamoras, just west of the Delaware River. I-84 reaches its highest elevation in Pennsylvania and in the east just west of exit 8 at 1,800 feet (550 m).

On October 15, 2011, the roadway was designated as the Fallen Trooper Memorial Highway throughout its length.

== History ==
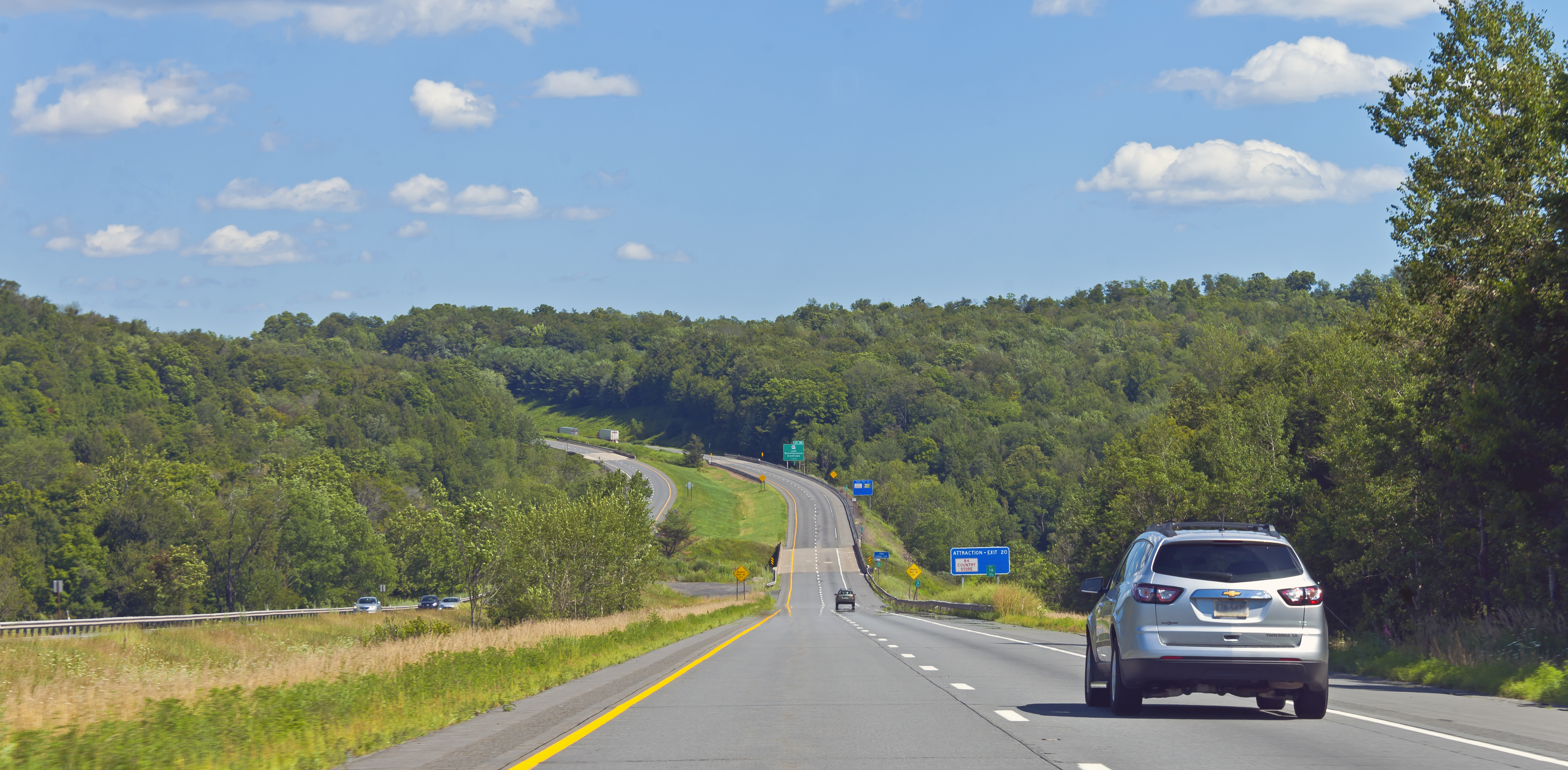
I-84 crossing from Wayne County into Pike County

I-84 was originally planned to run concurrently with US 6, but, in June 1958, due to a realignment of I-80, I-84 was redesignated as an Interstate. The plan was first revealed to the public in 1964. The first segment to be completed and open to traffic was the bridge spanning the Delaware River between Pennsylvania and New York. The second section from exit 26 to exit 53 opened in 1972.

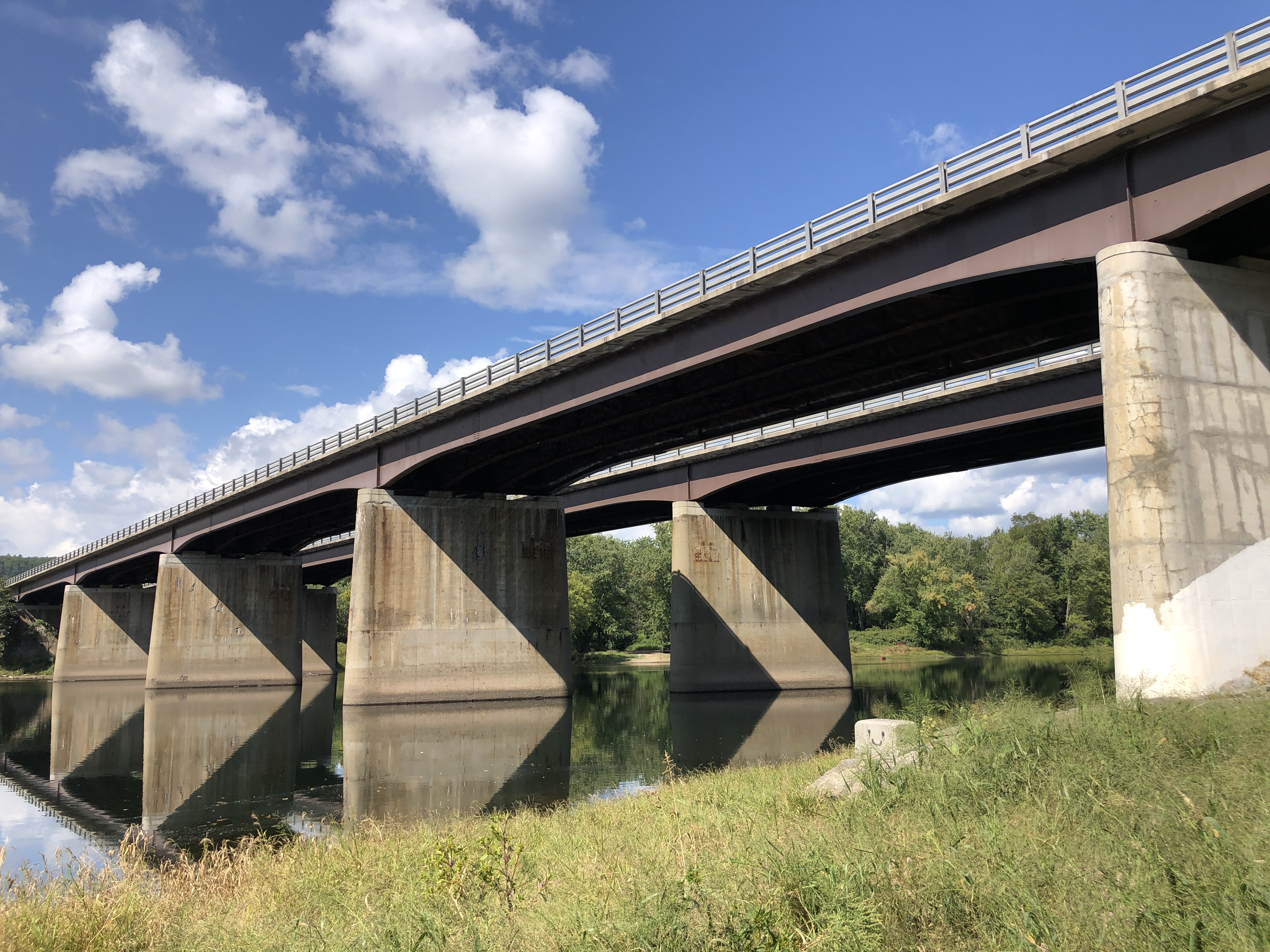
I-84 bridge over the Delaware River, with the Tri-State Rock in the foreground

I-84 was to continue west of I-380 and connect to I-81 at Moosic, but the alignment was moved further north, running concurrently with I-380 from Elmhurst Township to Dunmore. I-380 both ran east from I-81, sharing mileposts and exit numbers, with their split being an unnumbered exit 3 (in accordance with Pennsylvania Department of Transportation (PennDOT) policy at the time which did not allow interchanges between Interstates to be numbered). During the 2001 exit renumbering, I-380 became a north–south Interstate and its mileposts and exit numbers were reversed. Locally, the four-mile (6.4 km) overlapping section is commonly spoken as "380, 84". When the exits were renumbered, the exit tabs with button-copy letters for the old exit 4 were moved to the new exit 4 in the eastbound direction and remained in place until the signs were updated.

== Exit list ==
County	Location	mi	km	Old exit	New exit	Destinations	Notes
Lackawanna	Dunmore	0.000	0.000			I-81 / US 6 to PA 347 – Wilkes-Barre, Binghamton, Carbondale I-380 begins	Western terminus; northern terminus of I-380; exit 187 on I-81
Lackawanna	Dunmore	1.266	2.037	1	1	Tigue Street	
Lackawanna	Dunmore	2.457	3.954	2	2	PA 435 south – Elmhurst	Northern terminus of PA 435; eastbound exit and westbound entrance
Lackawanna	Roaring Brook Township	4.311	6.938	3	4	I-380 south – Mount Pocono	Eastern end of I-380 concurrency; exit 24 on I-380
Lackawanna	Jefferson Township	9.064	14.587	4	8	PA 247 north to PA 348 – Mount Cobb, Hamlin	Southern terminus of PA 247
Wayne	Sterling Township	17.530	28.212	5	17	PA 191 – Hamlin, Newfoundland	
Pike	Greene Township	20.903	33.640	6	20	PA 507 – Lake Wallenpaupack, Greentown	
Pike	Palmyra Township	27.015	43.476	7	26	PA 390 – Tafton, Promised Land State Park	
Pike	Blooming Grove Township	31.025	49.930	8	30	PA 402 – Porters Lake, Blooming Grove	
Pike	Dingman Township	34.912	56.185	9	34	PA 739 – Lords Valley, Dingmans Ferry	
Pike	Milford Township	46.861	75.415	10	46	US 6 – Milford	
Pike	Westfall Township	53.700	86.422	11	53	US 6 / US 209 – Matamoras	Access to Pennsylvania Welcome Center
Delaware River		54.637	87.930	Interstate 84 Bridge			
Delaware River		54.870	88.305			I-84 east – Port Jervis	Continuation into New York
1.000 mi = 1.609 km; 1.000 km = 0.621 mi: Concurrency terminus; Incomplete access

== See also ==
Interstate 84
Previous state: Terminus	Pennsylvania	Next state: New York
