= Pennsylvania Route 435 =

State highway in Pennsylvania, US

Pennsylvania Route 435

Route information
- Maintained by PennDOT
- Length: 14.925 mi (24.019 km)
- Existed: March 14, 1972–present

Major junctions
- South end: I-380 / PA 507 near Gouldsboro
- PA 307 in Covington Township; PA 502 in Covington Township; PA 690 in Moscow; PA 590 in Elmhurst Township; PA 348 in Elmhurst Township
- North end: I-84 / I-380 in Dunmore

Location
- Country: United States
- State: Pennsylvania
- Counties: Monroe, Wayne, Lackawanna

Highway system
- Pennsylvania State Route System; Interstate; US; State; Scenic; Legislative
← PA 434	→ PA 436

Pennsylvania Route 435 (PA 435) is a 14.9-mile-long (24.0 km) state highway located in Monroe, Wayne, and Lackawanna counties in Pennsylvania. The southern terminus is at Interstate 380 (I-380) near Gouldsboro. The northern terminus is at I-84 and I-380 in Dunmore. The route heads north from I-380 and the southern terminus of PA 507 in Monroe County as a four-lane road, passing through a small section of Wayne County before entering Lackawanna County. PA 435 becomes a two-lane road at the PA 307 junction and continues north to intersect PA 502 in Daleville and PA 690 in Moscow. After intersecting PA 590, the route becomes a four-lane divided highway and intersects PA 348 before merging into I-84/I-380.

The PA 435 alignment follows the Philadelphia and Great Bend Turnpike or Drinker Turnpike, a turnpike between Philadelphia and Great Bend chartered in 1811 and built in the 1820s. The road became part of the Lackawanna Trail, a paved auto trail between Easton and the New York border. The Lackawanna Trail became PA 2, which ran between Philadelphia and Great Bend, in 1924 and U.S. Route 611 (US 611), which ran between Philadelphia and Scranton, in 1926. The PA 2 designation was removed from US 611 two years later. Portions of US 611 south of Scranton were widened between the 1930s and 1960s. US 611 was decommissioned in 1972 and PA 435 replaced the route between Gouldsboro and Dunmore.

== Route description ==
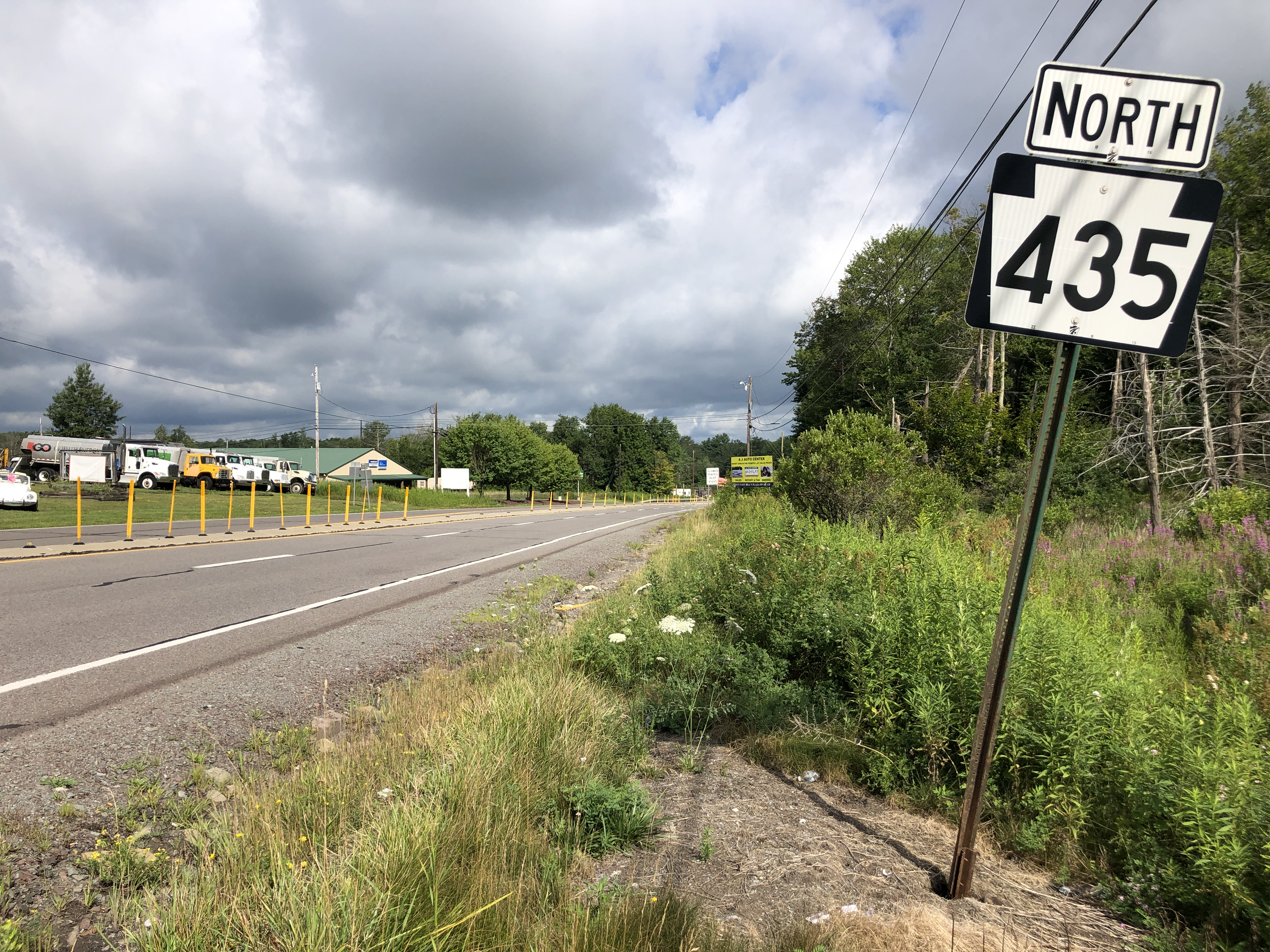
PA 435 northbound past PA 507 in Lehigh Township

PA 435 begins at an interchange with I-380's Exit 13 at the northwestern corner of Gouldsboro State Park in Coolbaugh Township, Monroe County, heading northeast as a two-lane undivided road. Immediately after beginning, the route reaches a junction with the southern terminus of PA 507 and turns northwest onto a four-lane divided highway. PA 435 heads northwestward out of Monroe County and passes through a corner of Lehigh Township in Wayne County before entering Lackawanna County at the crossing of the Lehigh River, becoming a four-lane undivided road. The roadway parallels a distance from I-380 through the rural stretches of Clifton Township. The highway continues north through Clifton, passing west of Big Bass Lake and soon the Covington Industrial Park. PA 435 continues a close parallel with the interstate as it passes east of Covington Lake and enters Covington Township. Just north of the township line, PA 435 forks to the northeast at a junction with PA 307 (the Scranton-Pocono Highway).

PA 435 continues to the northeast through the residential regions of Covington Township as a two-lane road, passing into the small hamlet of Daleville, where it gains a center left-turn lane. Through Daleville, the route remains residential, and enters the commercial hamlet and an intersection with PA 502 (Daleville Highway). PA 435 continues northward out of Daleville and begins to parallel with the Delaware-Lackawanna Railroad, narrowing to a two-lane road and briefly gaining a second southbound lane. The highway heads past the Saint Catherine's Cemetery and soon crosses into the borough of Moscow as a two-lane road. Heading through Moscow, PA 435 gains the moniker of South Main Street, and makes a large curve along the railroad line to an intersection with PA 690 (New Street). Here, PA 435 and PA 690 begin a concurrency through downtown Moscow, passing the local train station and at the intersection with Church Street, PA 690 turns west onto Church Street while PA 435 continues north along North Main Street.

Leaving downtown Moscow, PA 435 continues northward aside the Delaware-Lackawanna Railroad line. The forestry soon takes over and residences become sporadic as the route winds its way through Elmhurst Township. The rail line moves to the east a bit as both the railroad and PA 435 pass the Elmhurst Reservoir. Passing Fairview Memorial Park, Blue Shutters Road (State Route 2010) soon merges in. After the reservoir ends, PA 435 crosses under the curving rail line and continues northward into the hamlet of Elmhurst. Through Elmhurst, PA 435 begins a parallel with PA 590, which soon merges in with the main route. PA 435 becomes a four-lane expressway and continues northwestward out of Elmhurst, crossing over I-84. After this bridge, PA 348 merges into the highway. PA 348 ends at southbound PA 435 while northbound PA 435 passes over PA 348 with a ramp connection to the route. The highway winds along the Roaring Brook into Dunmore, following the Drinker Turnpike until it forks. PA 435 soon turns to the northwest once again and merges into exit 2 on the concurrent I-84 and I-380 in Dunmore.

== History ==
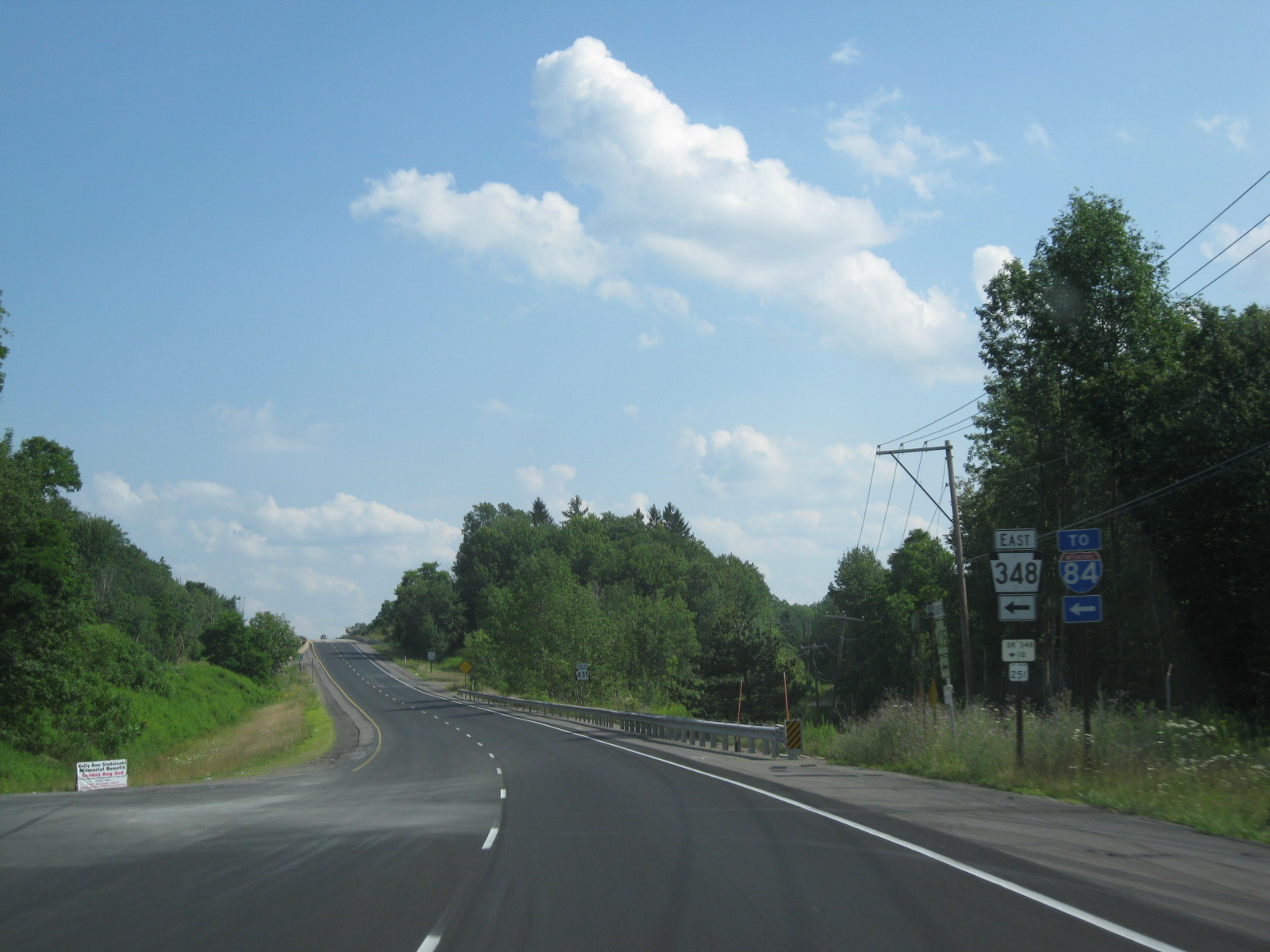
PA 435 southbound in Elmhurst Township at the junction with PA 348

In 1811, the Philadelphia and Great Bend Turnpike, a private turnpike, was chartered to run between Philadelphia and Great Bend. This turnpike was built to attract settlers to rural Pennsylvania. The section through Covington Township was built as a plank road between 1819 and 1826 by John Delong under the employment of Henry Drinker. The Philadelphia and Great Bend Turnpike, which was also known as the Drinker Turnpike, was built from 1826 to 1828.

When Pennsylvania legislated routes in 1911, what is now PA 435 was designated as part of Legislative Route 168, which ran from Stroudsburg to Scranton. In 1921, the Lackawanna Trail was built as a paved auto trail running from Easton north through Stroudsburg to Scranton and the New York border. After being constructed, the trail was one of the best paved roads in the eastern part of the United States. The Lackawanna Trail was designated as PA 2 in 1924, with the route running between Philadelphia and the New York border in Great Bend. When the U.S. Highway System was designated in 1926, US 611 was designated to run between Philadelphia and Scranton concurrent with PA 2, including the road between Gouldsboro and Dunmore. The concurrent PA 2 designation was removed from US 611 in 1928.

US 611 was widened to a multilane road from a point north of the PA 507 intersection north to the newly constructed PA 307 in the 1930s. In the 1940s, the route was widened south to PA 507 along with a short stretch to the north of PA 348. The section of US 611 between PA 590 and Dunmore was upgraded to a divided highway in 1958, with the section of the route leading into Dunmore moved to a new alignment. In 1969, an interchange with I-81E (now I-380) was built with US 611 near the southern terminus of PA 507, at which point US 611 headed south along the freeway. On December 3, 1971, the American Association of State Highway Officials approved the elimination of the US 611 designation. On March 14, 1972, US 611 was decommissioned and PA 435 replaced the route between I-380 in Gouldsboro and I-84/I-380 in Dunmore. Signs were changed by April of that year.

== Major intersections ==
County	Location	mi	km	Destinations	Notes
Monroe	Coolbaugh Township	0.000	0.000	I-380 south to I-80 – Stroudsburg, Hazleton	Southern terminus
Monroe	Coolbaugh Township	0.179	0.288	I-380 north – Scranton PA 507 north – Gouldsboro	Southern terminus of PA 507; exit 13 on I-380
Wayne	No major junctions				
Lackawanna	Covington Township	4.059	6.532	PA 307 north (Scranton-Pocono Highway)	Southern terminus of PA 307
Lackawanna	Covington Township	5.695	9.165	PA 502 west (Daleville Highway)	Eastern terminus of PA 502
Lackawanna	Moscow	7.743	12.461	PA 690 east (New Street) – Madisonville	Southern end of PA 690 concurrency
Lackawanna	Moscow	7.811	12.571	PA 690 west (Church Street) – Springbrook	Northern end of PA 690 concurrency
Lackawanna	Elmhurst Township	11.306	18.195	PA 590 east	Western terminus of PA 590
Lackawanna	Elmhurst Township	11.306	18.195	Southern end of limited-access section	
Lackawanna	Elmhurst Township	12.014	19.335	PA 348 east to I-84	Western terminus of PA 348
Lackawanna	Dunmore	14.925	24.019	I-84 west / I-380 north – Scranton	Northern terminus; exit 2 on I-84/I-380
1.000 mi = 1.609 km; 1.000 km = 0.621 mi: Concurrency terminus; Incomplete access
