= Mount Cobb, Pennsylvania =

Unincorporated community in Pennsylvania, US

- Census-designated place
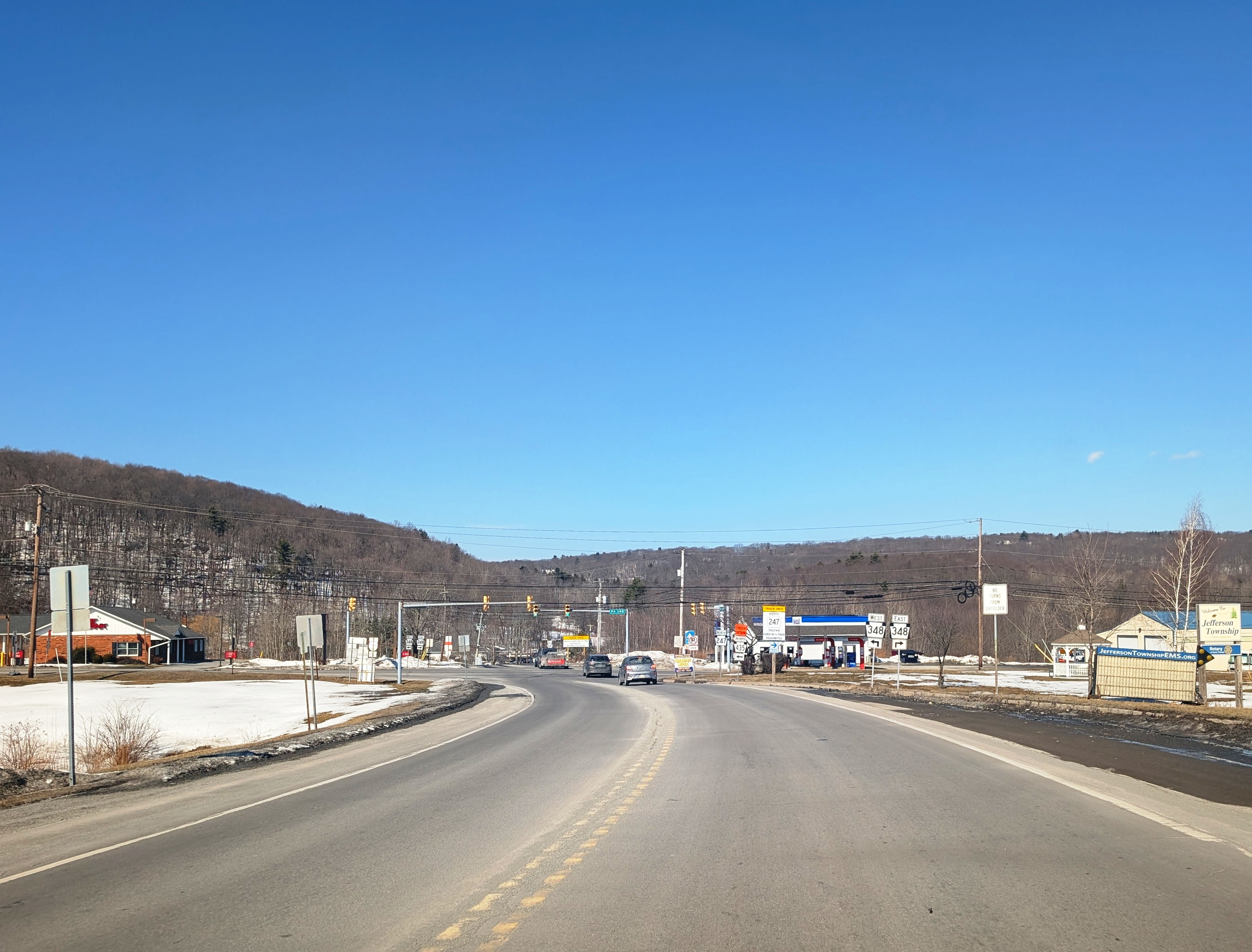
- PA 247 at PA 348 in Mount Cobb

- Location in Pennsylvania Location in the United States
- Coordinates: 41°24′48″N 75°29′45″W
- Country: United States
- State: Pennsylvania
- County: Lackawanna
- Township: Jefferson

Area
  - Total: 7.30 sq mi (18.90 km^{2})
  - Land: 7.14 sq mi (18.49 km^{2})
  - Water: 0.16 sq mi (0.41 km^{2})
- Elevation: 1,655 ft (504 m)

Population (2020)
  - Total: 1,763
  - Density: 246.9/sq mi (95.33/km^{2})
- Time zone: UTC-5 (EST)
  - Summer (DST): UTC-4 (EDT)
- ZIP Code: 18436
- Area code: 570
- FIPS code: 42-51536

Mount Cobb is an unincorporated community and census-designated place (CDP) in Lackawanna County, Pennsylvania, United States. The population was 1,799 at the 2010 census.

== Geography ==
Mount Cobb is located in eastern Lackawanna County at 41°25′28″N 75°30′19″W (41.424422, -75.505257), in the southern part of Jefferson Township. Interstate 84 forms the southern edge of the community, with access from Exit 8 (Pennsylvania Route 247). I-84 leads east 46 miles (74 km) to Port Jervis, New York, and west via Interstate 81 12 miles (19 km) to Scranton. Pennsylvania Route 348 (Mount Cobb Road) passes through the center of the community, leading east 5 miles (8 km) to Hamlin and west 3.5 miles (5.6 km) to Pennsylvania Route 435 in Roaring Brook Township. PA 247 leads northwest from Mount Cobb 6 miles (10 km) to Jessup.

According to the United States Census Bureau, the CDP has a total area of 7.3 square miles (18.9 km^{2}), of which 7.1 square miles (18.5 km^{2}) are land and 0.2 square miles (0.4 km^{2}), or 2.16%, are water. Most of the community drains east to the West Branch of Wallenpaupack Creek, a tributary of the Lackawaxen River and part of the Delaware River watershed. The western part of Mount Cobb drains west via Rock Bottom Creek to Roaring Brook, a west-flowing tributary of the Lackawanna River and part of the Susquehanna River watershed.

== Demographics ==
Historical population
Census	Pop.	Note	%±
2020	1,763		—
U.S. Decennial Census

As of the census of 2010, there were 1,799 people, 696 households, and 529 families residing in the CDP. The population density was 257 inhabitants per square mile (99/km^{2}). There were 826 housing units at an average density of 118/sq mi. The racial makeup of the CDP was 98.5% White, 0.3% African American, 0.1% Native American, 0.4% Asian, 0.1% from other races, and 0.7% from two or more races. Hispanic or Latino of any race were 0.8% of the population.

There were 696 households, out of which 29.3% had children under the age of 18 living with them, 64.9% were married couples living together, 6.5% had a female householder with no husband present, and 24% were non-families. 19.3% of all households were made up of individuals, and 7.5% had someone living alone who was 65 years of age or older. The average household size was 2.58 and the average family size was 2.96.

In the CDP, the population was spread out, with 21.3% under the age of 18, 64.4% from 18 to 64, and 14.3% who were 65 years of age or older. The median age was 44.6 years.

The median income for a household in the CDP was $44,725, and the median income for a family was $52,933. Males had a median income of $33,051 versus $23,971 for females. The per capita income for the CDP was $20,855. About 1.4% of families and 2.8% of the population were below the poverty line, including 3.5% of those under age 18 and none of those age 65 or over.

== Education ==
The school district is North Pocono School District.

== Notable people ==
- Kevin Vincent Jr., 2024 & 2025 PIAA District II 2A triple jump champion for Holy Cross High School, Entrepreneur
