= Rowland, Pennsylvania =

Unincorporated community in Pennsylvania, US

- Unincorporated community
- PA 590 eastbound in Rowland

- Location within Pennsylvania
- Coordinates: 41°28′16″N 75°02′32″W
- Country: United States
- State: Pennsylvania
- County: Pike
- Elevation: 699 ft (213 m)
- Time zone: UTC-5 (Eastern (EST))
  - Summer (DST): UTC-4 (EDT)
- ZIP code: 18457
- Area codes: 272 & 570
- GNIS feature ID: 1199424

Rowland is an unincorporated community in Pike County, Pennsylvania, United States. The community is located along the Lackawaxen River and Pennsylvania Route 590, 7.4 miles (11.9 km) east of Hawley. Rowland has a post office with ZIP code 18457, which opened on January 20, 1838.
