= Pennsylvania Route 237 =

Highway in Pennsylvania

Pennsylvania Route 237

Route information
- Maintained by Pennsylvania Department of Highways
- Length: 3.88 mi (6.24 km)
- Existed: 1928–1946

Major junctions
- West end: PA 37 in Lackawaxen
- East end: PA 137 in Shohola Township

Location
- Country: United States
- State: Pennsylvania

Highway system
- Pennsylvania State Route System; Interstate; US; State; Scenic; Legislative
← PA 236	→ PA 238

Pennsylvania Route 237 (PA 237) was an 3.88-mile (6.24 km) route between PA 37 and PA 590 in Lackawaxen to an intersection with PA 137 (now PA 434) in Shohola Township. The route followed the shores of the Delaware River as Lackawaxen Road. The route's alignment, after assignment in 1928, remained the same until being removed from the state highway system in 1946. The route was paved in 1932, and the route is now known as State Route 1012 (SR 1012) and Shohola Township Roads 413 and 454.

== Route description ==
The alignment of PA 237 began at an intersection with its parent highway, PA 37 in Lackawaxen Township, near Roebling's Delaware Aqueduct. This is currently the intersection with PA 590. The highway heads eastward along the banks of the Delaware River and a nearby railroad track towards Shohola Township. There is an intersection with Delaware Drive just after the inception. Delaware Drive heads to a dead-end at the banks of the Delaware River. The highway passes some homes to the north and a dense forest to the south. There is also a mansion atop a nearby hill. After a clearing, the highway enters the dense forest completely and turns to the southeast.

With the train tracks, Delaware River and New York State Route 97 paralleling to the north, the highway begins a southeastern track. There are some occasional clearings, The old alignment of PA 237 passes a pond as the highway pulls away from the river and train tracks with the forests becoming a majority the surroundings. The old alignment of PA 237 passes a pond, as the highway pulls away from the river and train tracks. The highway intersects with Township Road 413, which serves access to Hirsh Pond, located to the north. The route begins to head through larger clearings as it continues southeast. At an intersection with German Hill Road, the highway makes a shot to the east, passing through some woods. After the woods, the old alignment of PA 237 ends at an intersection with PA 434. This was once an intersection with PA 137.

== History ==
PA 237 was assigned in 1928, during the mass numbering of state highways within Pennsylvania. The termini at the time were with PA 37 and PA 137, the former of which was the parent route. At the time, the entire highway was an unimproved gravel road. This lasted for four years, until 1932, when the Pennsylvania Department of Highways paved the highway. The highway remained relatively unchanged until 1946, when the highway was decommissioned in a mass deletion of state highways within the commonwealth. The current alignment of former PA 237 is now Pike County SR 1012 from PA 590 to the Shohola Township border. The rest is locally maintained, with a piece at PA 434 designated Shohola Township Roads 413 and 454. The two state routes at the termini, PA 37 and PA 137, are now PA 434 and PA 590.

== Major intersections ==
The entire route was in Pike County.

Location	mi	km	Destinations	Notes
Lackawaxen	0.00	0.00	PA 37	Western terminus
Shohola Township	3.88	6.24	PA 137	Eastern terminus
1.000 mi = 1.609 km; 1.000 km = 0.621 mi

== See also ==
- Pennsylvania Route 434
- Pennsylvania Route 590
- List of state routes in Pennsylvania
