= Hamlin, Wayne County, Pennsylvania =

Unincorporated community in Pennsylvania, US

Hamlin, Pennsylvania
- Village
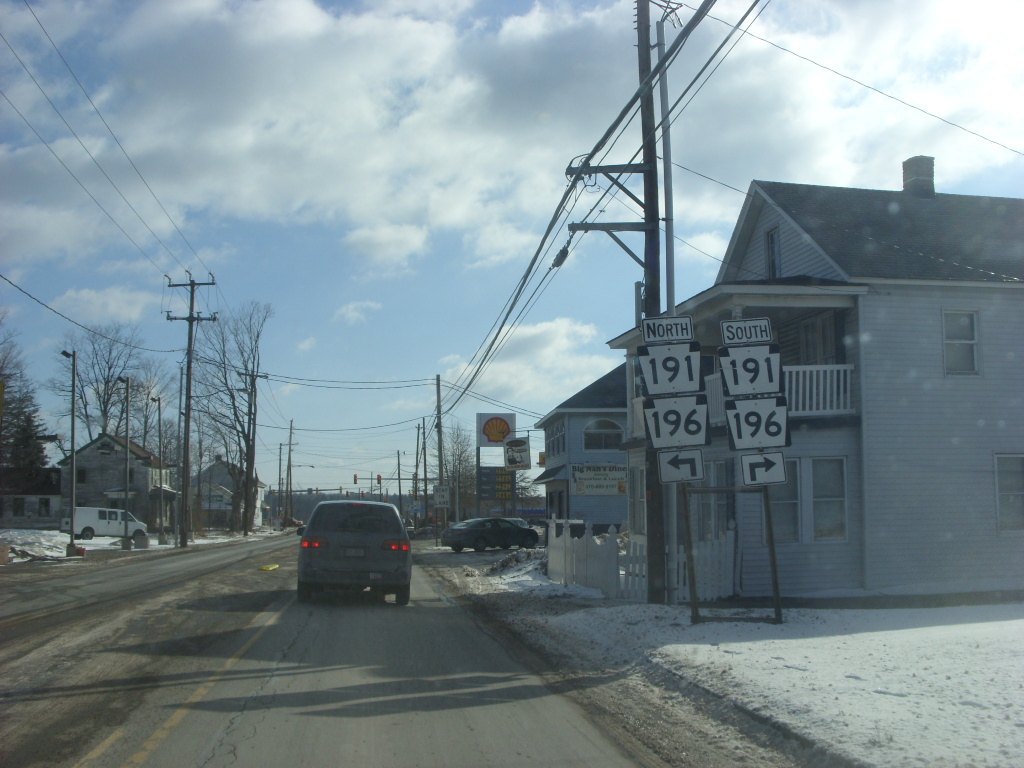
- Eastbound PA 590 in Hamlin

- Location within Pennsylvania Location within the United States
- Coordinates: 41°24′13″N 75°23′55″W
- Country: United States
- State: Pennsylvania
- County: Wayne
- Township: Salem
- Elevation: 1,575 ft (480 m)
- Time zone: UTC-5 (Eastern (EST))
  - Summer (DST): UTC-4 (EDT)
- ZIP code: 18427
- Area codes: 570 and 272
- GNIS feature ID: 1198855

Hamlin is a village in Salem Township, Wayne County, Pennsylvania, United States. Hamlin is located at the intersection of Pennsylvania Route 191/Pennsylvania Route 196 and Pennsylvania Route 590.
