= Madison Township, Lackawanna County, Pennsylvania =

Township in Pennsylvania, US

Madison Township
- Township
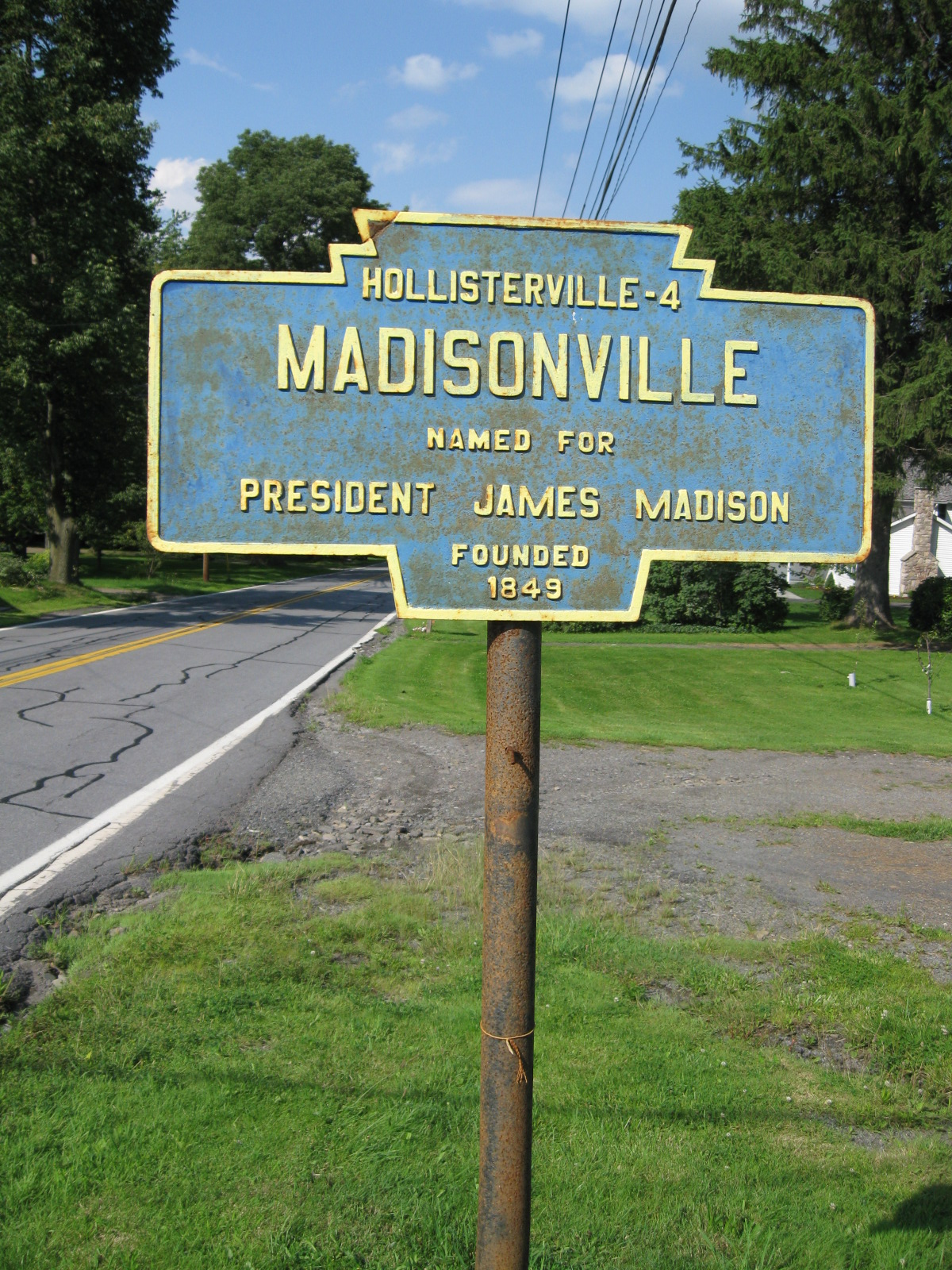

- Location of Pennsylvania in the United States
- Coordinates: 41°20′00″N 75°28′59″W
- Country: United States
- State: Pennsylvania
- County: Lackawanna

Area
  - Total: 17.05 sq mi (44.17 km^{2})
  - Land: 16.95 sq mi (43.90 km^{2})
  - Water: 0.10 sq mi (0.27 km^{2})
- Elevation: 1,883 ft (574 m)

Population (2020)
  - Total: 2,476 ▼
  - Estimate (2021): 2,479
  - Density: 155.9/sq mi (60.19/km^{2})
- Time zone: UTC-5 (EST)
  - Summer (DST): UTC-4 (EDT)
- Area code: 570
- FIPS code: 42-069-46480
- Website: https://madisontwppa.org/

Madison Township is a township in Lackawanna County, Pennsylvania, United States. The population was 2,476 at the 2020 census. Madisonville and Quicktown are part of Madison Township.

== Geography ==
According to the United States Census Bureau, the township has a total area of 17.1 square miles (44.3 km^{2}), of which 17.0 square miles (44.0 km^{2}) is land and 0.1 square mile (0.3 km^{2}) (0.70%) is water.

== Demographics ==
Historical population
Census	Pop.	Note	%±
2010	2,750		—
2020	2,476		−10.0%
2021 (est.)	2,479		0.1%
U.S. Decennial Census

As of the census of 2010, there were 2,750 people, 1,025 households, and 775 families residing in the township. The population density was 149.7 inhabitants per square mile (57.8/km^{2}). There were 1,094 housing units at an average density of 58.0 units per square mile (22.4 units/km^{2}). The racial makeup of the township was 98.40% White, 0.40% African American, 0.50% Asian, and 0.70% from two or more races. Hispanic or Latino of any race were 0.70% of the population.

There were 1,025 households, out of which 31.7% had children under the age of 18 living with them, 61.6% were married couples living together, 5.0% had a male householder with no wife present, 9.1% had a female householder with no husband present, and 24.4% were non-families. 20.3% of all households were made up of individuals, and 7.8% had someone living alone who was 65 years of age or older. The average household size was 2.68 and the average family size was 3.10.

In the township the population was spread out, with 27% 19 years or younger, 5.2% from 20 to 24, 23.2% from 25 to 44, 32.1% from 45 to 64, and 12.6% who were 65 years of age or older. The median age was 42.1 years. For every 100 females, there were 96.6 males. Male and female populations over 18 years of age were evenly balanced, with 1,045 females over 18 compared to 1,035 males over 18.

According to the census of 2010, the median income for a household in the township was $50,592, and the median income for a family was $55,436. Males had a median income of $48,357 versus $36,528 for females. The per capita income for the township was $22,014. About 7.4% of families and 10.7% of the population were below the poverty line, including 18.5% of those under age 18 and 7% of those age 65 or over.
