= Madisonville, Pennsylvania =

Unincorporated community in Pennsylvania, US

- Unincorporated community
- Madisonville Christian Church

- Location within Pennsylvania Location within the United States
- Coordinates: 41°21′31″N 75°28′31″W
- Country: United States
- State: Pennsylvania
- County: Lackawanna
- Township: Madison
- Elevation: 1,719 ft (524 m)
- Time zone: UTC-5 (Eastern (EST))
  - Summer (DST): UTC-4 (EDT)
- Area codes: 570 and 272
- GNIS feature ID: 1180187

Madisonville is an unincorporated community in Madison Township in Lackawanna County, Pennsylvania. Madisonville is located at the intersection of Pennsylvania Route 690 and Reservoir Road, northeast of Moscow.
