= Daleville, Pennsylvania =

Unincorporated community in Pennsylvania, US

Coordinates: 41°18′18″N 75°30′50″W

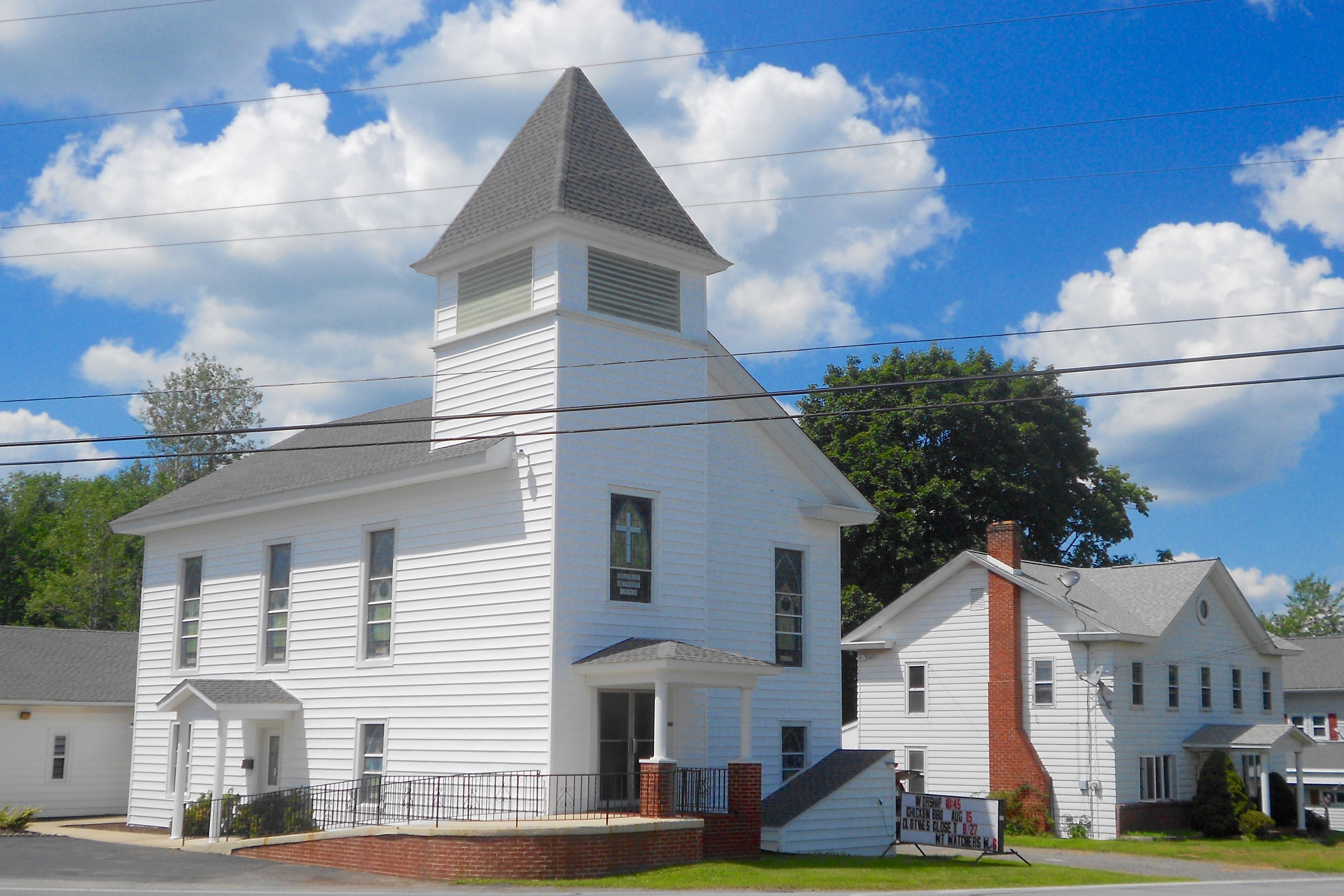
Daleville United Methodist Church

Daleville is a small village located in Covington Township in Lackawanna County, Pennsylvania, United States.

== Location ==
Daleville, like most villages in Pennsylvania, is loosely defined by local residents, although its generally agreed-upon center is at the intersection of Route 502 and Route 435 in Covington Township.
