= Hollisterville, Pennsylvania =

Unincorporated community in Pennsylvania, US

- Unincorporated community
- Hollisterville Bible Church

- Location within Pennsylvania Location within the United States
- Coordinates: 41°23′28″N 75°26′19″W
- Country: United States
- State: Pennsylvania
- County: Wayne
- Elevation: 1,414 ft (431 m)
- Time zone: UTC-5 (Eastern (EST))
  - Summer (DST): UTC-4 (EDT)
- Area codes: 570 & 272
- GNIS feature ID: 1198902

Hollisterville (also Hallisterville) is an unincorporated community in Wayne County, Pennsylvania, United States.

== Notable person ==
Lewis Steward (1824-1896), Illinois politician and businessman, was born near Hollisterville.
