= Jefferson Township, Lackawanna County, Pennsylvania =

Township in Pennsylvania, US

Jefferson Township
- Township
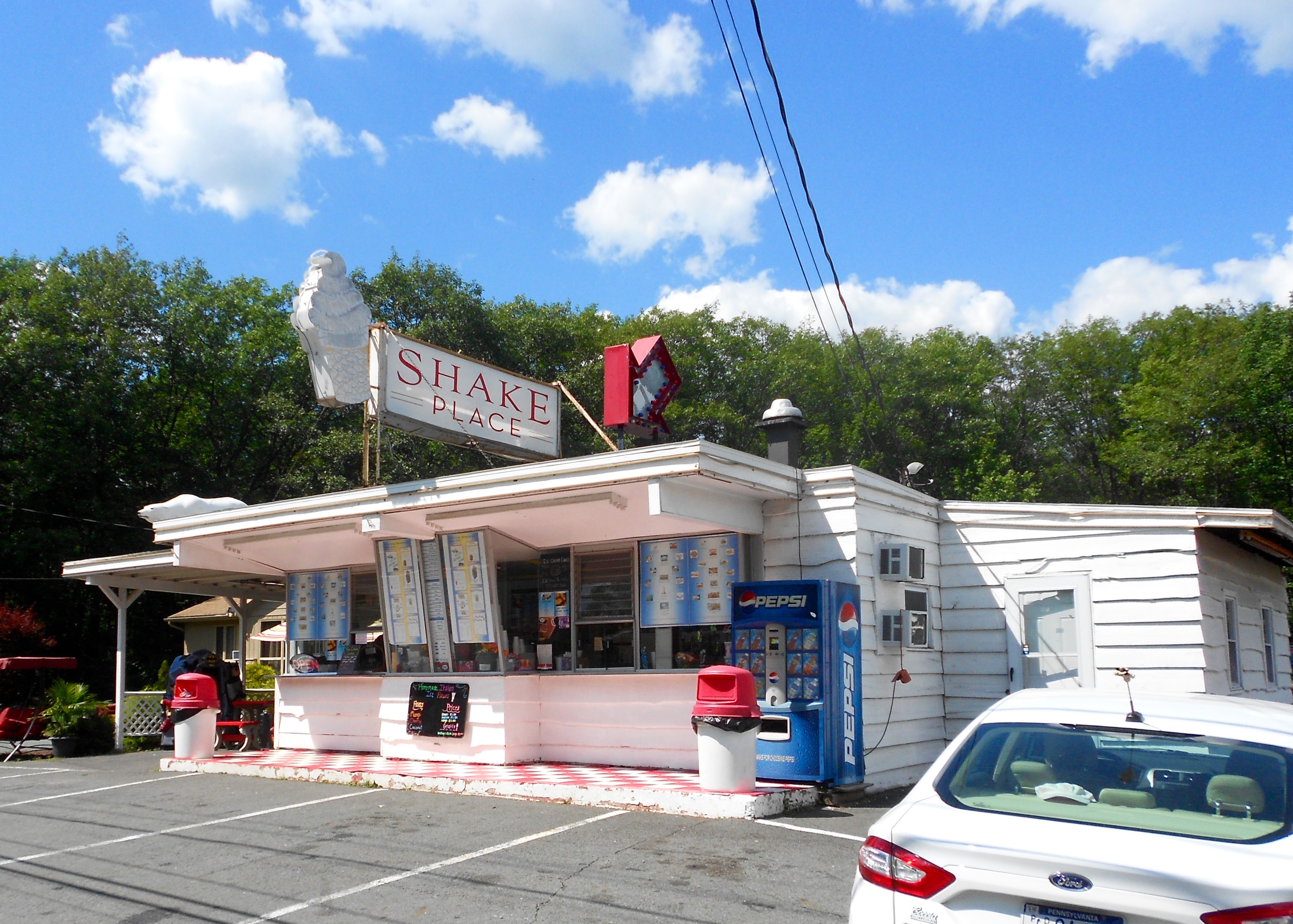
- Ice cream stand

- Flag Logo

- Location of Pennsylvania in the United States
- Coordinates: 41°31′00″N 75°28′59″W
- Country: United States
- State: Pennsylvania
- County: Lackawanna
- Settled: 1784

Area
  - Total: 33.93 sq mi (87.87 km^{2})
  - Land: 33.55 sq mi (86.89 km^{2})
  - Water: 0.38 sq mi (0.98 km^{2})
- Elevation: 1,972 ft (601 m)

Population (2020)
  - Total: 3,775 ▲
  - Estimate (2021): 3,799
  - Density: 109.4/sq mi (42.24/km^{2})
- Time zone: UTC-5 (EST)
  - Summer (DST): UTC-4 (EDT)
- Postal codes: 18403, 18436, 18444
- Area code: 570
- FIPS code: 42-069-37896
- Website: https://jeffersontwplackawanna.gov/

Jefferson Township is a township in Lackawanna County, Pennsylvania, United States. The population was 3,775 at the 2020 census.

== Geography ==
According to the United States Census Bureau, the township has a total area of 34.0 square miles (88 km^{2}), of which 33.5 square miles (87 km^{2}) is land and 0.5 square miles (1.3 km^{2}) (1.59%) is water. The village of Mount Cobb is in the southern part of the township.

== Demographics ==
Historical population
Census	Pop.	Note	%±
2000	3,592		—
2010	3,731		3.9%
2020	3,775		1.2%
2021 (est.)	3,799		0.6%
U.S. Decennial Census

As of the census of 2010, there were 3,731 people, 1,460 households, and 1,101 families residing in the township. The population density was 111.4 people per square mile. There were 1,698 housing units at an average density of 50.7/sq mi. The racial makeup of the township was 98.1% White, 0.6% African American, 0.2% Native American, 0.3% Asian, 0.2% from other races, and 0.6% from two or more races. Hispanic or Latino of any race were 1.5% of the population.

There were 1,460 households, out of which 27.5% had children under the age of 18 living with them, 64% were married couples living together, 7.1% had a female householder with no husband present, and 24.6% were non-families. 19.7% of all households were made up of individuals, and 7.8% had someone living alone who was 65 years of age or older. The average household size was 2.56 and the average family size was 2.93.

In the township the population was spread out, with 20.6% under the age of 18, 64.8% from 18 to 64, and 14.6% who were 65 years of age or older. The median age was 45.3 years.

The median income for a household in the township was $55,603, and the median income for a family was $67,592. Males had a median income of $60,685 versus $33,333 for females. The per capita income for the township was $26,920. About 1.1% of families and 2.7% of the population were below the poverty line, including 1.3% of those under age 18 and 4.2% of those age 65 or over.
