= Salem Township, Wayne County, Pennsylvania =

Township in Pennsylvania, US

Salem Township
- Township
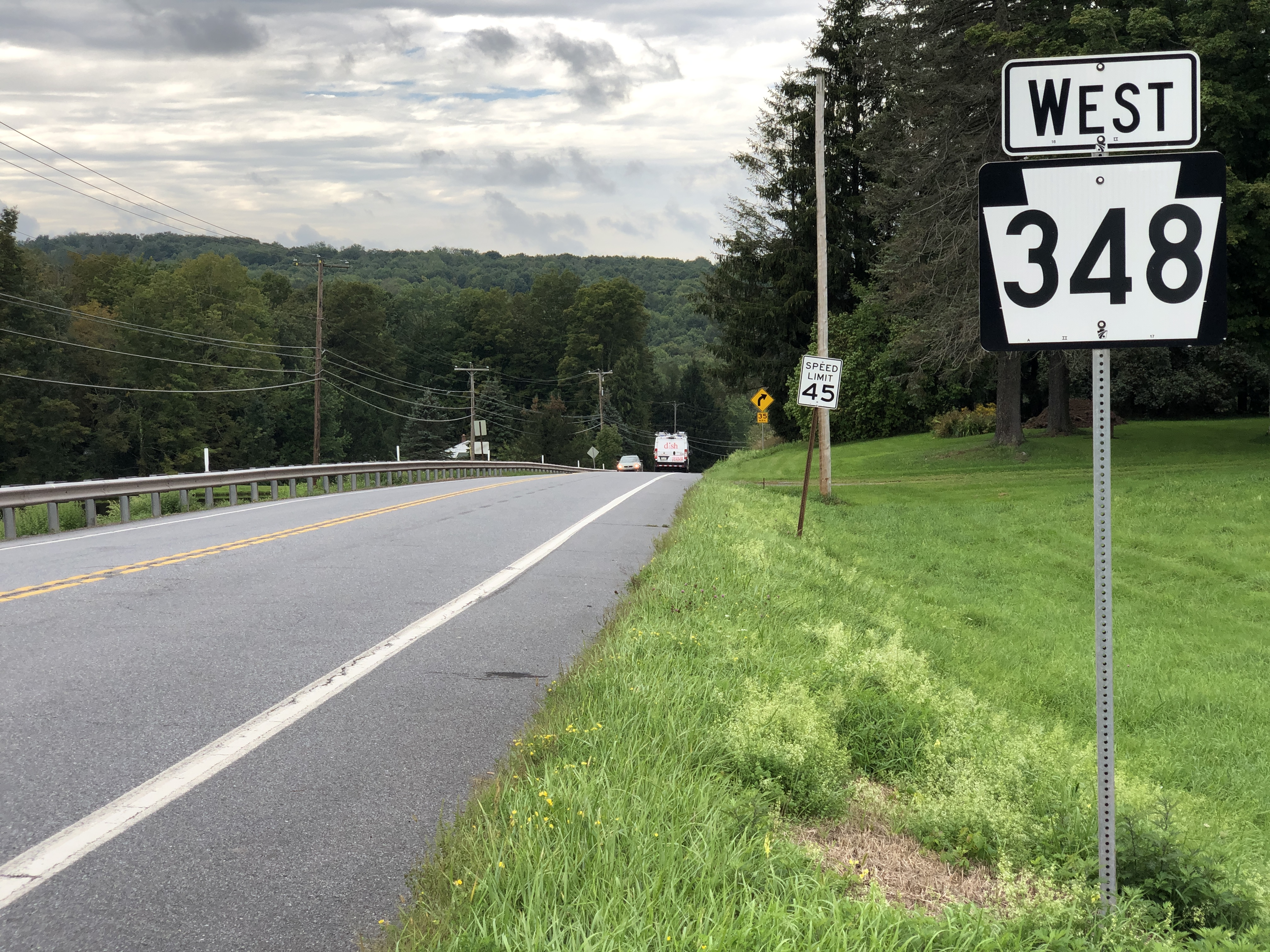
- PA 348 in Salem Township

- Location in Wayne County and the state of Pennsylvania.

- Location of Pennsylvania in the United States
- Coordinates: 41°25′00″N 75°24′59″W
- Country: United States
- State: Pennsylvania
- County: Wayne

Area
  - Total: 31.44 sq mi (81.42 km^{2})
  - Land: 30.56 sq mi (79.14 km^{2})
  - Water: 0.88 sq mi (2.28 km^{2})
- Elevation: 1,594 ft (486 m)

Population (2010)
  - Total: 4,271
  - Estimate (2016): 4,063
  - Density: 133.0/sq mi (51.34/km^{2})
- Time zone: UTC-5 (EST)
  - Summer (DST): UTC-4 (EDT)
- Zip Code: 18427, 18436, 18444
- Area code: 570
- FIPS code: 42-127-67488
- Website: https://salemtwpwayne.com/

Salem is a second-class township in Wayne County, Pennsylvania, United States. The township's population was 4,271 at the time of the 2010 United States Census.

== History ==
Lacawac was listed on the National Register of Historic Places in 1979.

== Geography ==
According to the United States Census Bureau, the township has a total area of 31.5 square miles (81.6 km^{2}), of which 30.6 square miles (79 km^{2}) is land and 0.9 square mile (2 km^{2}) (2.86%) is water. It contains part of the census-designated place of The Hideout.

== Demographics ==
Historical population
Census	Pop.	Note	%±
2010	4,271		—
2016 (est.)	4,063		−4.9%
U.S. Decennial Census

As of the census of 2010, there were 4,271 people, 1,770 households, and 1,238 families residing in the township. The population density was 139.6 inhabitants per square mile (53.9/km^{2}). There were 3,019 housing units at an average density of 98.7 per square mile (38.1/km^{2}). The racial makeup of the township was 96.9% White, 1.1% African American, 0.16% Native American, 0.5% Asian, 0.4% from other races, and 1.2% from two or more races. Hispanic or Latino of any race were 3.3% of the population.

There were 1,770 households, out of which 22.3% had children under the age of 18 living with them, 56.9% were married couples living together, 8.4% had a female householder with no husband present, and 30.1% were non-families. 25% of all households were made up of individuals, and 9.8% had someone living alone who was 65 years of age or older. The average household size was 2.40 and the average family size was 2.85.

In the township the population was spread out, with 19% under the age of 18, 60.6% from 18 to 64, and 20.4% who were 65 years of age or older. The median age was 47.9 years.

The median income for a household in the township was $36,215, and the median income for a family was $40,602. Males had a median income of $32,450 versus $19,648 for females. The per capita income for the township was $16,947. About 9.3% of families and 12.3% of the population were below the poverty line, including 17.1% of those under age 18 and 9.3% of those age 65 or over.
