= Roaring Brook Township, Pennsylvania =

Township in Pennsylvania, US

Roaring Brook Township
- Township
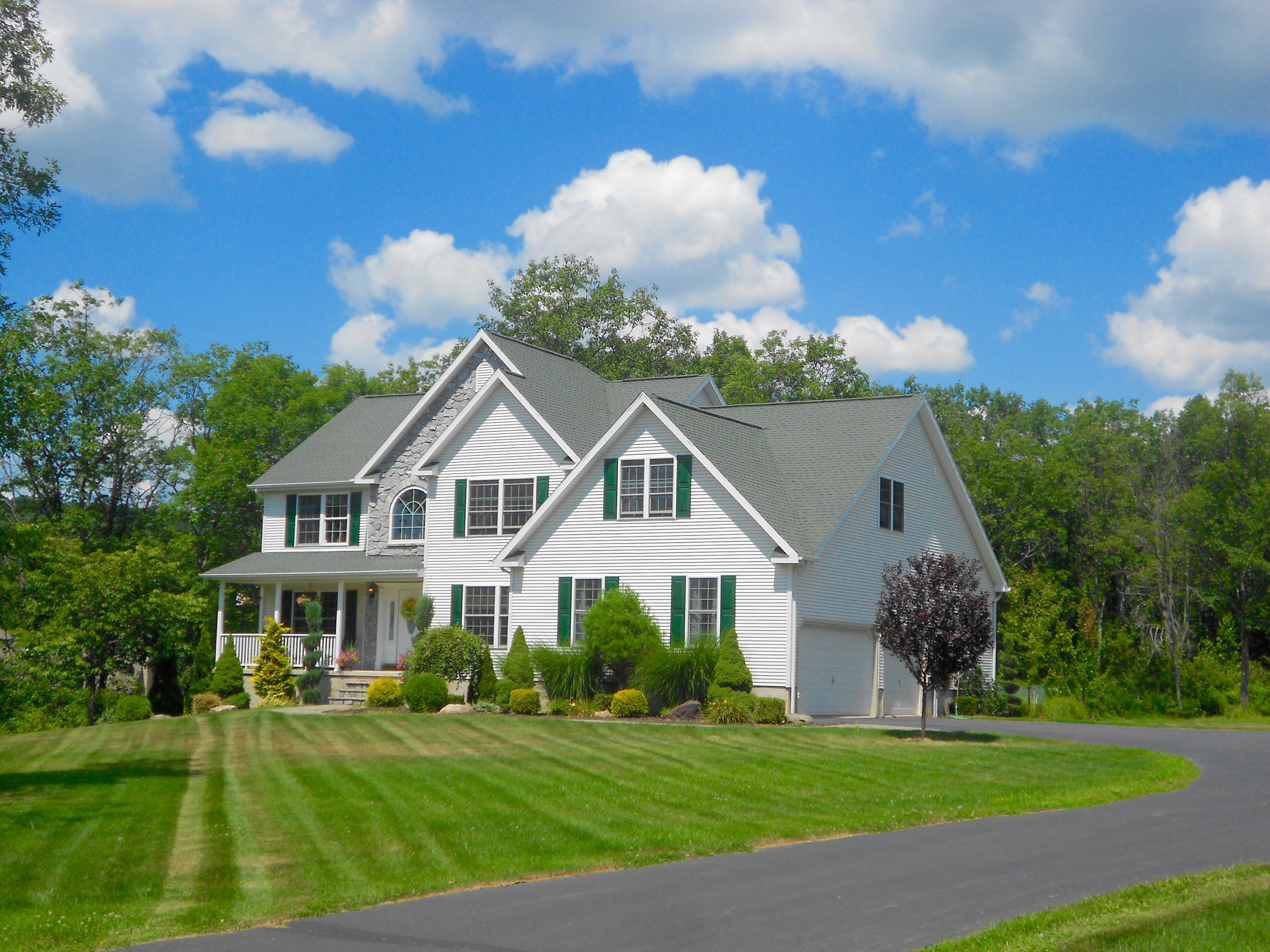
- House in the township

- Location of Pennsylvania in the United States
- Coordinates: 41°21′00″N 75°34′59″W
- Country: United States
- State: Pennsylvania
- County: Lackawanna

Area
  - Total: 21.87 sq mi (56.64 km^{2})
  - Land: 21.42 sq mi (55.47 km^{2})
  - Water: 0.45 sq mi (1.17 km^{2})
- Elevation: 1,660 ft (510 m)

Population (2020)
  - Total: 2,271 ▲
  - Estimate (2021): 2,289
  - Density: 91.1/sq mi (35.17/km^{2})
- Time zone: UTC-5 (EST)
  - Summer (DST): UTC-4 (EDT)
- Postal code: 18444
- Area code: 570
- FIPS code: 42-069-65224

Roaring Brook Township is a township in Lackawanna County, Pennsylvania, United States. The population was 2,271 at the 2020 census.

== Geography ==
According to the United States Census Bureau, the township has a total area of 21.8 square miles (56.5 km^{2}), of which 21.4 square miles (55 km^{2}) is land and 0.4 square mile (1 km^{2}) (1.83%) is water. The township surrounds Elmhurst Township. Hence, Elmhurst Township is an enclave of Roaring Brook Township.

== Demographics ==
Historical population
Census	Pop.	Note	%±
2010	1,907		—
2020	2,271		19.1%
2021 (est.)	2,289		0.8%
U.S. Decennial Census

As of the census of 2010, there were 1,907 people, 728 households, and 571 families residing in the township. The population density was 89.1 people per square mile. There were 759 housing units at an average density of 35.5/sq mi. The racial makeup of the township was 98% White, 0.5% African American, 0.1% Pacific Islander, 0.7% Asian, 0.2% from other races, and 0.6% from two or more races. Hispanic or Latino of any race were 1% of the population.

There were 728 households, out of which 29.4% had children under the age of 18 living with them, 69.8% were married couples living together, 6.5% had a female householder with no husband present, and 21.6% were non-families. 18.7% of all households were made up of individuals, and 10.2% had someone living alone who was 65 years of age or older. The average household size was 2.61 and the average family size was 2.98.

In the township the population was spread out, with 22.3% under the age of 18, 58.8% from 18 to 64, and 18.9% who were 65 years of age or older. The median age was 44.5 years.

The median income for a household in the township was $69,583, and the median income for a family was $74,167. Males had a median income of $51,250 versus $37,143 for females. The per capita income for the township was $30,132. About 2.6% of families and 3.5% of the population were below the poverty line, including 3.9% of those under age 18 and 2.4% of those age 65 or over.
