= Elmhurst Township, Lackawanna County, Pennsylvania =

Township in Pennsylvania, US

Elmhurst Township
- Township
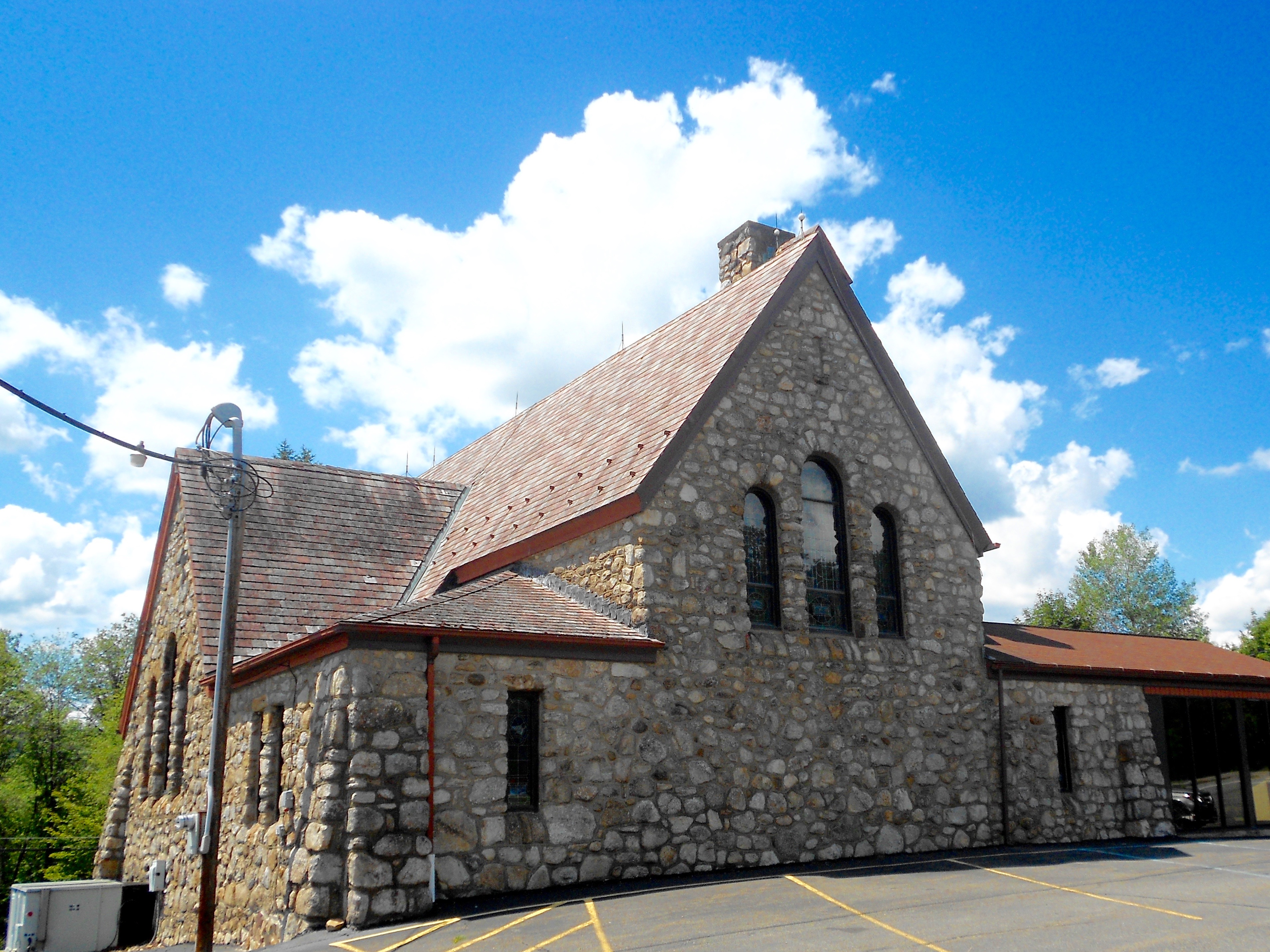
- Cross Road Assembly of God Church

- Location of Pennsylvania in the United States
- Coordinates: 41°22′00″N 75°32′59″W
- Country: United States
- State: Pennsylvania
- County: Lackawanna

Area
  - Total: 1.93 sq mi (5.01 km^{2})
  - Land: 1.85 sq mi (4.78 km^{2})
  - Water: 0.093 sq mi (0.24 km^{2})
- Elevation: 1,581 ft (482 m)

Population (2020)
  - Total: 836 ▼
  - Estimate (2021): 834
  - Density: 465/sq mi (179.4/km^{2})
- Time zone: UTC-5 (EST)
  - Summer (DST): UTC-4 (EDT)
- ZIP code: 18444
- Area code: 570
- FIPS code: 42-069-23336
- Website: elmhursttownship.org

Elmhurst Township is a township in Lackawanna County, Pennsylvania, United States. Established in 1826. The population was 836 at the 2020 census.

== Geography ==
According to the United States Census Bureau, the township has a total area of 1.9 square miles (4.9 km^{2}), of which 1.8 square miles (4.7 km^{2}) is land and 0.1 square miles (0.26 km^{2}) (4.23%) is water. The township is surrounded by Roaring Brook Township. Hence, Elmhurst Township is an enclave of Roaring Brook Township.

== Demographics ==
Historical population
Census	Pop.	Note	%±
2010	894		—
2020	836		−6.5%
2021 (est.)	834		−0.2%
U.S. Decennial Census

=== 2010 census ===
At the 2010 census there were 894 people, 330 households, and 216 families living in the township. The population density was 496.6 people per square mile. There were 348 housing units at an average density of 193.3/sq mi. The racial makeup of the township was 98.4% White, 0.3% African American and 0.1% Asian. Hispanic or Latino of any race were 1.1%.

There were 330 households, 17.4% had children under the age of 18 living with them, 51.5% were married couples living together, 8.8% had a female householder with no husband present, and 34.5% were non-families. 31.2% of households were made up of individuals, and 22.1% were one person aged 65 or older. The average household size was 2.39 and the average family size was 3.

The age distribution was 18.7% under the age of 18, 50.4% from 18 to 64, and 30.9% 65 or older. The median age was 50 years.

The median household income was $39,821 and the median family income was $73,750. Males had a median income of $49,219 versus $37,778 for females. The per capita income for the township was $22,070. About 5.4% of families and 4.5% of the population were below the poverty line, including 4.2% of those under age 18 and 9.1% of those age 65 or over.

=== 2000 census ===
At the 2000 census there were 838 people, 258 households, and 198 families living in the township. The population density was 462.5 inhabitants per square mile (178.6/km^{2}). There were 274 housing units at an average density of 151.2 units per square mile (58.4 units/km^{2}). The racial makeup of the township was 99.88% White and 0.12% African American. Hispanic or Latino of any race were 0.24%.

There were 258 households, 32.6% had children under the age of 18 living with them, 64.0% were married couples living together, 8.9% had a female householder with no husband present, and 22.9% were non-families. 19.4% of households were made up of individuals, and 11.2% were one person aged 65 or older. The average household size was 2.64 and the average family size was 3.01.

The age distribution was 17.2% under the age of 18, 6.8% from 18 to 24, 21.5% from 25 to 44, 22.8% from 45 to 64, and 31.7% 65 or older. The median age was 48 years. For every 100 females there were 72.1 males. For every 100 females age 18 and over, there were 70.9 males.

The median household income was $47,917 and the median family income was $49,861. Males had a median income of $39,583 versus $25,625 for females. The per capita income for the township was $17,465. About 1.0% of families and 1.6% of the population were below the poverty line, including 2.2% of those under age 18 and 4.8% of those age 65 or over.
