= Green Run (Spring Brook tributary) =

Green Run Green Run Creek

Physical characteristics
- Source
  - location: pond near Tooley Corners in Spring Brook Township, Pennsylvania
  - elevation: between 1,640 and 1,660 feet (500 and 510 m)
- Mouth
  - location: Spring Brook in Spring Brook Township, Pennsylvania
  - coordinates: 41°19′45″N 75°39′22″W
  - elevation: 1,152 ft (351 m)
- Length: 4.7 mi (7.6 km)
- Basin size: 4.32 mi^{2} (11.2 km^{2})

Basin features
- Progression: Spring Brook → Lackawanna River → Susquehanna River → Chesapeake Bay

Green Run (also known as Green Run Creek) is a tributary of Spring Brook in Lackawanna County, Pennsylvania, in the United States. It is approximately 4.7 miles (7.6 km) long and flows through Spring Brook Township, Roaring Brook Township, and Scranton. The watershed of the stream has an area of 4.32 square miles (11.2 km^{2}). It is considered to be Class A Wild Trout Waters throughout its entire length. Numerous macroinvertebrate taxa also inhabit the stream. The surficial geology in the vicinity of the stream's lower reaches mainly consists of Wisconsinan Till, bedrock, and Boulder Colluvium.

== Course ==
Green Run begins in a pond near Tooley Corners in Spring Brook Township. It flows northwest for a few tenths of a mile and almost immediately enters Roaring Brook Township. It then turns west and crosses Pennsylvania Route 307 before turning southwest. Several tenths of a mile further downstream, it reenters Spring Brook Township and turns west-northwest, reentering Roaring Brook Township. The stream then turns west and enters Scranton. After a few tenths of a mile, it turns southwest and reenters Spring Brook Township. It flows generally in a westerly direction for a few miles in a deep valley near the border between Spring Brook Township and Scranton. The stream eventually turns south-southwest for several tenths of a mile and reaches its confluence with Spring Brook.

Green Run joins Spring Brook 6.48 miles (10.43 km) upstream of its mouth.

== Hydrology ==
The concentration of alkalinity in Green Run is 17 milligrams per liter. In the 1970s, the Roaring Brook Sewage Treatment Plant discharged high levels of sewage into the stream after rains.

== Geography and geology ==
The elevation near the mouth of Green Run is 1,152 feet (351 m) above sea level. The elevation of the stream's source is between 1,640 and 1,660 feet (500 and 510 m) above sea level.

Green Run is a perennial stream.

The surficial geology along the valley floor in the lower reaches of Green Run mainly consists of a glacial or resedimented till known as Wisconsinan Till. The sides of the valley have bedrock consisting of conglomerate, sandstone, and shale. Some patches of Boulder Colluvium are also present.

== Watershed ==
The watershed of Green Run has an area of 4.32 square miles (11.2 km^{2}). The mouth of the stream is in the United States Geological Survey quadrangle of Avoca. However, its source is in the quadrangle of Moscow.

A total of 74 percent of the length of Green Run is on public land. The remaining 26 percent is on private land. A swampy meadow was observed near the stream in the early 1900s.

== History and recreation ==
Green Run was entered into the Geographic Names Information System on August 2, 1979. Its identifier in the Geographic Names Information System is 1192551.

The Spring Brook Railroad historically went up the valley of Green Run.

A bridge carrying Pennsylvania Route 307 over Green Run was once replaced for a cost of $600,000. In the early 2000s, the Lackawanna River Watershed Conservation Plan recommended that Spring Brook Township include protection of Green Run in their comprehensive plans, as well as their ordinances for land use, zoning, and subdivision. In 2015, a tract of land containing the stream was purchased by the Pennsylvania Department of Conservation and Natural Resources and made public land.

In-stream fishing is permitted on Green Run.

== Biology ==
Wild trout naturally reproduce in Green Run from its headwaters downstream to its mouth. The stream is also considered by the Pennsylvania Fish and Boat Commission to be Class A Wild Trout Waters from its headwaters downstream to its mouth. It meets the criteria for an Exceptional Value designation, a designation that gives extensive protection to a stream, forbidding any impact on water quality for any reason.

Numerous butterfly species were observed in the vicinity of Green Run in the early 1900s. They included Polygonia faunus, Polygonia faunus, Argynnis atlantis, and Harris's checkerspot.

A large number of macroinvertebrate species have been observed in Green Run, including 16 genera in the orders Ephemeroptera, Plecoptera, and Trichoptera. Of a 210-individual sample, the most common taxa included Ephemerella (57 individuals), Chironomidae (39 individuals), Cheumatopsyche (19 individuals), Pteronarcys (17 individuals), and Baetis (10 individuals). Less common taxa included Epeorus (9 individuals), Dolophilodes (7 individuals), Acroneuria (6 individuals), Leuctra (5 individuals), and Hexatoma (5 individuals). Rarer taxa included Isoperfa (4 individuals), Optioservus (4 individuals), Lanthus (4 individuals), Drunella (3 individuals), Pycnopsyche (3 individuals), Polycentropus (3 individuals), Rhycophi (3 individuals), Agapetus (2 individuals), and Nigronia (2 individuals). The rarest taxa were Lepidostoma, Boyeria, and Cambaridae (1 individual each).

The modified Hilsenhoff Biotic Index value of Green Run is 2.83. The modified EPT Index value is 12 and the total taxa richness is 23.

== See also ==
- Monument Creek (Spring Brook), next tributary of Spring Brook going downstream
- Rattlesnake Creek (Spring Brook), next tributary of Spring Brook going upstream
- List of rivers of Pennsylvania
- List of tributaries of the Lackawanna River
