= Six Springs Creek =

Physical characteristics
- Source
  - location: valley near Interstate 380 in Spring Brook Township, Lackawanna County, Pennsylvania
  - elevation: between 1,700 and 1,720 feet (520 and 520 m)
- Mouth
  - location: Rattlesnake Creek in Spring Brook Township, Lackawanna County, Pennsylvania
  - coordinates: 41°18′53″N 75°35′01″W
  - elevation: 1,450 ft (440 m)
- Length: 2.1 mi (3.4 km)
- Basin size: 2.95 mi^{2} (7.6 km^{2})

Basin features
- Progression: Rattlesnake Creek → Spring Brook → Lackawanna River → Susquehanna River → Chesapeake Bay
- Tributaries
  - left: three unnamed tributaries
  - right: two unnamed tributaries

Six Springs Creek is a tributary of Rattlesnake Creek in Lackawanna County, Pennsylvania, in the United States. It is approximately 2.1 miles (3.4 km) long and flows through Spring Brook Township. The watershed of the creek has an area of 2.95 square miles (7.6 km^{2}). Wild trout naturally reproduce in the creek and it is considered to be a High-Quality Coldwater Fishery. However, it has been affected by sewage contamination. The surficial geology in the creek's vicinity consists of Wisconsinan Till, bedrock, Wisconsinan Ice-Contact Stratified Drift, and wetlands.

== Course ==
Six Springs Creek begins in a valley near Interstate 380 in Spring Brook Township. It flows south for several tenths of a mile and crosses Pennsylvania Route 307 before turning southwest, receiving two unnamed tributaries from the left and entering a valley. In the valley, the creek gradually turns west-northwest, passing through several ponds and receiving three more unnamed tributaries: one from the left and two from the right. The creek eventually turns southwest and after a short distance, reaches its confluence with Rattlesnake Creek.

Six Springs Creek joins Rattlesnake Creek 3.40 miles (5.47 km) upstream of its mouth.

== Hydrology ==
The waters of Six Springs Creek used to be potable. However, runoff from septic tanks has caused the creek to experience substantial pollution. In 1984 Our Water: Legacy in Peril described the creek as being "a catch basin for runoffs from a car wash, laundromat and malfunctioning septic tanks". One entity also has a permit to discharge stormwater into the creek.

The waters of Six Springs Creek indirectly feed into the Nesbitt Reservoir, an unfiltered reservoir owned by the Pennsylvania Gas and Water Company. However, the officials of the company made plans to improve the chlorination facilities of the pipelines carrying water from the reservoir.

== Geography and geology ==
The elevation near the mouth of Six Springs Creek is 1,450 feet (440 m) above sea level. The elevation of the creek's source is between 1,700 and 1,720 feet (520 and 520 m) above sea level.

The surficial geology in the vicinity of Six Springs Creek mainly consists of a glacial or resedimented till known as Wisconsinan Till. However, patches of bedrock consisting of conglomeratic sandstone, sandstone, and shale are also present, as are smaller areas of Wisconsinan Ice-Contact Stratified Drift. There are also a few patches of wetland.

IH Land Development, Inc. has received a permit to construct and maintain a road and a driveway crossing through 0.18 acres (730 m^{2}) of wetland in the watershed of Six Springs Creek. The purpose of this project is to provide access to Tranquility Woods Residential Development, just south of the corner of Pennsylvania Route 690 and Maple Lake Road.

== Watershed ==
The watershed of Six Springs Creek has an area of 2.95 square miles (7.6 km^{2}). The watershed is mostly in Spring Brook Township. However, a small part is in Covington Township. The creek is entirely within the United States Geological Survey quadrangle of Moscow.

There is a tract of Exceptional Value wetland in the watershed of Six Springs Creek.

== History ==
Six Springs Creek was entered into the Geographic Names Information System on August 2, 1979. Its identifier in the Geographic Names Information System is 1187734.

In 2001, the Lackawanna River Watershed Conservation Plan recommended that Spring Brook Township include protection of Six Springs Creek in their zoning plans. A culvert carrying Swartz Valley Road across the creek was constructed some time before 2011. It was damaged during Tropical Storm Lee in 2011 and plans were later made to replace it for $263,730.

== Biology ==
Wild trout naturally reproduce in Six Springs Creek from its headwaters downstream to its mouth. The watershed of the creek is designated as a High-Quality Coldwater Fishery.

== See also ==
- List of rivers of Pennsylvania
- List of tributaries of the Lackawanna River
