= Trout Creek (Monument Creek tributary) =

Physical characteristics
- Source
  - location: mountain in Spring Brook Township, Lackawanna County, Pennsylvania
  - elevation: between 1,760 and 1,780 feet (540 and 540 m)
- Mouth
  - location: Monument Creek in Spring Brook Township, Lackawanna County, Pennsylvania
  - coordinates: 41°19′29″N 75°41′17″W
  - elevation: 935 ft (285 m)
- Length: 3.4 mi (5.5 km)

Basin features
- Progression: Monument Creek → Spring Brook → Lackawanna River → Susquehanna River → Chesapeake Bay
- Tributaries
  - left: one unnamed tributary
  - right: two unnamed tributaries

Trout Creek is a tributary of Monument Creek in Lackawanna County, Pennsylvania, in the United States. It is approximately 3.4 miles (5.5 km) long and flows through Spring Brook Township. Wild trout naturally reproduce in the creek. It has no named tributaries, but does have three unnamed tributaries. The surficial geology in the vicinity of the creek mainly consists of bedrock, Wisconsinan Till, alluvium, fill, wetlands, and lakes.

== Course ==
Trout Creek begins on a mountain in Spring Brook Township. It flows northwest for a short distance before turning north-northeast for a few miles. The creek almost immediately passes through a small pond and begins flowing down the mountain in a valley. It receives an unnamed tributary from the left and later two more from the right. Its valley then becomes much deeper and narrower and it turns north-northwest for more than a mile. The creek then turns west and a few tenths of a mile further downstream, reaches its confluence with Monument Creek.

=== Tributaries ===
Trout Creek has no named tributaries. However, it does have a number of unnamed tributaries. The largest tributary is its first one, which begins in Pittston Township, Luzerne County and flows in a northeasterly direction for nearly a mile to its confluence with Trout Brook.

== Geography and geology ==
The elevation near the mouth of Trout Creek is 935 feet (285 m) above sea level. The elevation of the creek's source is between 1,760 and 1,780 feet (540 and 540 m) above sea level.

In the lower reaches of Trout Creek, the surficial geology along the valley floor consists of alluvium. The sides of the valley mainly have surficial geology containing bedrock consisting of conglomerate, sandstone, and shale. Further upstream, the surficial geology along the creek mainly consists of a glacial or resedimented till known as Wisconsinan Till. However, large areas of bedrock and some small patches of fill and wetlands are also present. There is also one small lake in the watershed's upper reaches.

Part of Mount Pisgah is in the watershed of Trout Creek.

== Watershed and biology ==
Most of the watershed of Trout Creek is in Spring Brook Township, Lackawanna County. However, a small area of the upper reaches of the watershed is in Pittston Township, in Luzerne County. Trout Creek is entirely within the United States Geological Survey quadrangle of Avoca.

Wild trout naturally reproduce in Trout Creek from its headwaters downstream to its mouth.

== History ==
Trout Creek was entered into the Geographic Names Information System on August 2, 1979. Its identifier in the Geographic Names Information System is 1189833.

In the early 2000s, the Lackawanna River Watershed Conservation Plan recommended that Spring Brook Township include protection of Trout Creek in their comprehensive plans, as well as their ordinances for land use, zoning, and subdivision.

== See also ==
- List of rivers of Pennsylvania
