= Painter Creek =

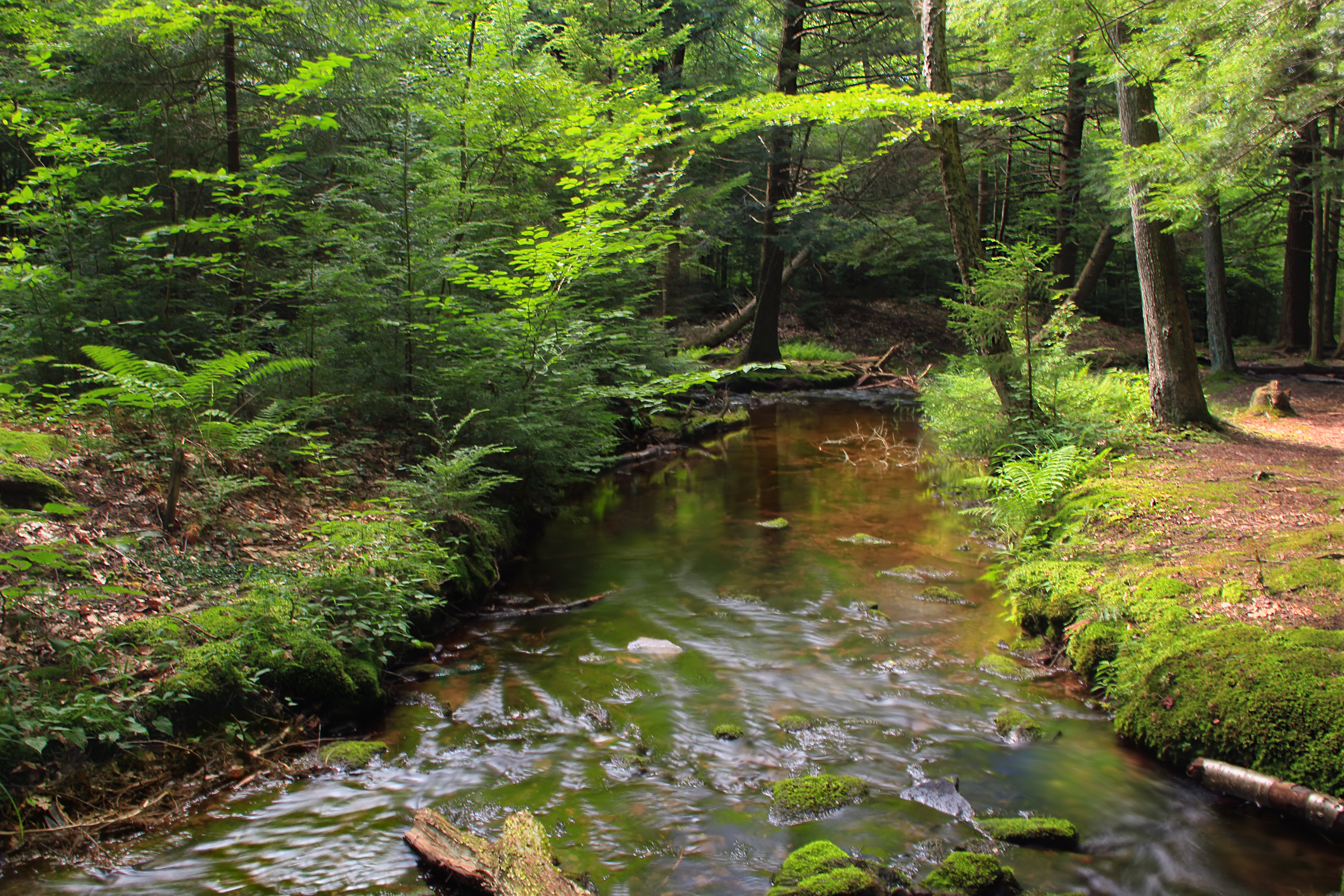
- Painter Creek looking downstream near its headwaters

Physical characteristics
- Source
  - location: northeast of Big Pine Hill in Thornhurst Township, Lackawanna County, Pennsylvania
  - elevation: between 2,000 and 2,020 feet (610 and 620 m)
- Mouth
  - location: Panther Creek in Spring Brook Township, Lackawanna County, Pennsylvania
  - coordinates: 41°16′59″N 75°37′51″W
  - elevation: 1,411 ft (430 m)
- Length: 3.4 mi (5.5 km)
- Basin size: 4.51 sq mi (11.7 km^{2})

Basin features
- Progression: Panther Creek → Spring Brook → Lackawanna River → Susquehanna River → Chesapeake Bay
- Tributaries
  - left: two unnamed tributaries

Painter Creek is a tributary of Panther Creek in Lackawanna County, Pennsylvania, in the United States. It is approximately 3.4 miles (5.5 km) long and flows through Thornhurst Township and Spring Brook Township. The watershed of the creek has an area of 4.51 square miles (11.7 km^{2}). Wild trout naturally reproduce in the creek and a hiking trail is in its vicinity. The surficial geology in the area consists of Wisconsinan Till, bedrock, and wetlands. A bog known as the Painter Creek Bog is listed on the Lackawanna County Natural Areas Inventory.

== Course ==
Painter Creek begins northeast of Big Pine Hill in Thornhurst Township. It flows west-northwest for several tenths of a mile before turning north in a valley. After nearly a mile, the creek turns north-northwest and enters Spring Brook Township. It then turns north-northeast for more than a mile and receives two unnamed tributaries from the left before reaching its confluence with Panther Creek.

Painter Creek joins Panther Creek 0.90 square miles (2.3 km^{2}) upstream of its mouth.

== Geography and geology ==
The elevation near the mouth of Painter Creek is 1,411 feet (430 m) above sea level. The elevation near the source of the creek is between 2,000 and 2,020 feet (610 and 620 m) above sea level.

The surficial geology in the vicinity of Painter Creek mainly consists of a glacial or resedimented till known as Wisconsinan Till. Further away from the creek, there is bedrock consisting of conglomerate, shale, and sandstone. There are also a few patches of wetlands.

== Watershed ==
The watershed of Painter Creek has an area of 4.51 square miles (11.7 km^{2}). Nearly all of the watershed is in Thornhurst Township and Spring Brook Township. However, a small corner is in Bear Creek Township, in Luzerne County. The mouth of the creek is in the United States Geological Survey quadrangle of Avoca. However, its source is in the quadrangle of Pleasant View Summit.

A bog known as the Painter Creek Bog is listed on the Lackawanna Natural Areas Inventory. It is a glacial kettlehole bog of fair quality and is undisturbed. It is located in Pinchot State Forest. The main threats to the area include flooding be beavers and logging. The bog has an area of 5 acres (2.0 ha) and contains approximately 0.5 acres (0.20 ha) of open water.

== History and recreation ==
Painter Creek was entered into the Geographic Names Information System on August 2, 1979. Its identifier in the Geographic Names Information System is 1183201.

In the early 2000s, the Lackawanna River Watershed Conservation Plan recommended that Spring Brook Township include protection of Painter Creek in their comprehensive plans, as well as their ordinances for land use, zoning, and subdivision. In 2012, the Pennsylvania Fish and Boat Commission considered adding the creek, along with several dozen others in Pennsylvania, to its list of wild trout streams.

The Painter Creek Greenway was proposed in the Open Space, Greenways & Outdoor Recreation Master Plan for Luzerne County and Lackawanna County. The entire length of the creek is in Pinchot State Forest. The 23-mile (37-kilometer) Pinchot Trail passes near the creek in one section.

== Biology ==
Wild trout naturally reproduce in Painter Creek from its headwaters downstream to its mouth. Bears were observed in the vicinity of Painter Creek in the late 1800s.

The Painter Creek Bog mainly consists of a floating peat mat with low growths of sphagnum and graminoids. Shrubs such as highbush blueberry are also present in the bog. Further away, there are boreal conifer trees such as spruce and larch.

== See also ==
- List of rivers of Pennsylvania
- List of tributaries of the Lackawanna River
