= Rattlesnake Creek (Spring Brook tributary) =

Physical characteristics
- Source
  - location: near Tooley Corners in Spring Brook Township, Pennsylvania
  - elevation: between 1,680 and 1,700 feet (510 and 520 m)
- Mouth
  - location: Spring Brook at the Nesbitt Reservoir in Spring Brook Township, Pennsylvania
  - coordinates: 41°18′49″N 75°38′18″W
  - elevation: 1,171 ft (357 m)
- Length: 5.0 mi (8.0 km)
- Basin size: 9.18 sq mi (23.8 km^{2})

Basin features
- Progression: Spring Brook → Lackawanna River → Susquehanna River → Chesapeake Bay
- Tributaries
  - left: Six Springs Creek

Rattlesnake Creek is a tributary of Spring Brook in Lackawanna County, Pennsylvania, in the United States. It is approximately 5.0 miles (8.0 km) long and flows through Spring Brook Township. The watershed of the creek has an area of 9.18 square miles (23.8 km^{2}). The creek has one named tributary, which is known as Six Springs Creek. Rattlesnake Creek is inhabited by wild trout and part of it is considered to be Class A Wild Trout Waters. A dammed lake known as Maple Lake is located near its headwaters. The surficial geology in the area mainly consists of Wisconsinan Till and bedrock, with some alluvium, Wisconsinan Ice-Contact Stratified Drift, wetlands, and peat bogs.

== Course ==
Rattlesnake Creek begins near Tooley Corners in Spring Brook Township. It flows south for a few tenths of a mile and enters Maple Lake. On the southern side of the lake, it flows south for several tenths of a mile, crossing Pennsylvania Route 690 and receiving the tributary Six Springs Creek from the left. The creek then turns west for more than a mile before turning northwest and then north-northwest. After a few miles, it turns southwest and reaches its confluence with Spring Brook in the Nesbitt Reservoir.

Rattlesnake Creek joins Spring Brook 7.96 miles (12.81 km) upstream of its mouth.

=== Tributaries ===
Rattlesnake Creek has one named tributary, which is known as Six Springs Creek. Six Springs Creek joins Rattlesnake Creek 3.40 miles (5.47 km) upstream of its mouth. Its watershed has an area of 2.95 square miles (7.6 km^{2}).

== Hydrology ==
The concentration of alkalinity in Rattlesnake Creek is 17 milligrams per liter.

== Geography and geology ==
The elevation near the mouth of Rattlesnake Creek is 1,171 feet (357 m) above sea level. The elevation near the source of the creek is between 1,680 and 1,700 feet (510 and 520 m) above sea level.

The surficial geology along Rattlesnake Creek near its mouth mainly consists of alluvium. However, some patches of Wisconsinan Ice-Contact Stratified Drift and alluvial fan are present, as are larger areas of a glacial or resedimented till known as Wisconsinan Till and bedrock consisting of conglomerate, sandstone, and shale. Further upstream, the surficial geology immediately adjacent to the creek consists of alluvium, but it eventually switches to Wisconsinan Till, which also makes up most of the surficial geology elsewhere in the watershed. However, there are a few large patches of bedrock and a few small patches of Wisconsinan Ice-Contact Stratified Drift. Additionally, there are several patches of wetlands and peat bogs, especially near the headwaters.

== Watershed ==
The watershed of Rattlesnake Creek has an area of 9.18 square miles (23.8 km^{2}). The mouth of the creek is in the United States Geological Survey quadrangle of Avoca. However, its source is in the quadrangle of Moscow.

A lake known as Maple Lake is on the upper reaches of Rattlesnake Creek. It has an area of approximately 80 acres (32 ha). The lake is dammed by the Maple Lake Dam, a homogeneous earthfill embankment. The dam has a width of 490 feet (150 m) and a maximum height of 23 feet (7.0 m).

Below the second Pennsylvania Route 690 crossing, Rattlesnake Creek is entirely on private land and is closed to access.

== History ==
Rattlesnake Creek was entered into the Geographic Names Information System on August 2, 1979. Its identifier in the Geographic Names Information System is 1184670.

There were historically lumber woods in the vicinity of Rattlesnake Creek. A concrete tee beam bridge carrying Pennsylvania Route 690 was constructed across Rattlesnake Creek in 1957. It is 36.1 feet (11.0 m) long and is situated in Spring Brook Township.

== Biology ==
Wild trout naturally reproduce in Rattlesnake Creek from its headwaters downstream to its mouth. The creek is also considered by the Pennsylvania Fish and Boat Commission to be Class A Wild Trout Waters for brook trout and brown trout from the second crossing of Pennsylvania Route 690 downstream to its mouth, a distance of 2.2 miles (3.5 km). The creek has supported trout populations as early as the 1970s.

== See also ==
- Green Run (Spring Brook), next tributary of Spring Brook going downstream
- Plank Bridge Creek, next tributary of Spring Brook going upstream
- List of tributaries of the Lackawanna River
