= Monument Creek =

Monument Creek may refer to several places:

- Monument Creek (Arkansas River), an El Paso County, Colorado stream on the Arkansas River water basin
- Monument Creek (Spring Brook tributary), Luzerne County and Lackawanna County, Pennsylvania
