= Monument Creek (Spring Brook tributary) =

Physical characteristics
- Source
  - location: lake in Pittston Township, Pennsylvania
  - elevation: between 1,620 and 1,640 feet (490 and 500 m)
- Mouth
  - location: Spring Brook in Pittston Township, Pennsylvania
  - coordinates: 41°19′42″N 75°41′24″W
  - elevation: 869 ft (265 m)
- Length: 2.8 mi (4.5 km)

Basin features
- Progression: Spring Brook → Lackawanna River → Susquehanna River → Chesapeake Bay
- Tributaries
  - right: Trout Creek

Monument Creek is a tributary of Spring Brook in Luzerne County and Lackawanna County, in Pennsylvania, in the United States. It is approximately 2.8 miles (4.5 km) long and flows through Pittston Township in Luzerne County and Spring Brook Township. The creek is considered to be a High-Quality Coldwater Fishery. It has one named tributary, which is known as Trout Creek. The surficial geology in the vicinity of Monument Creek consists of bedrock, Wisconsinan Till, alluvium, Wisconsinan Ice-Contact Stratified Drift, and fill.

== Course ==
Monument Creek begins in a lake in Pittston Township, Luzerne County. It flows north-northeast for nearly a mile before passing through another pond and turning north. After a few tenths of a mile, it turns north-northeast again and exits Luzerne County. Upon exiting Luzerne County, the creek enters Spring Brook Township, Lackawanna County. It continues flowing north-northeast in a deep valley and re-enters Pittston Township, Luzerne County. It then turns northeast for a few tenths of a mile before turning north-northwest for several tenths of a mile, receiving the tributary Trout Creek from the right and crossing Pennsylvania Route 502 before reaching its confluence with Spring Brook.

=== Tributaries ===
Monument Creek has one named tributary, which is known as Trout Creek.

== Geography and geology ==
The elevation near the mouth of Monument Creek is 869 feet (265 m) above sea level. The elevation near the source of the creek is between 1,620 and 1,640 feet (490 and 500 m) above sea level.

The surficial geology in the vicinity of the lower reaches of Monument Creek mainly consists of alluvium and Wisconsinan Ice-Contact Stratified Drift. However, a glacial or resedimented till known as Wisconsinan Till is also present, as is bedrock consisting of conglomerate, sandstone, and shale. Further upstream, the surficial geology consists almost entirely of Wisconsinan Till and bedrock, but some fill is present as well. Near the headwaters, there are also small patches of alluvium and Wisconsinan Ice-Contact Stratified Drift, as well as one lake.

At one point, Monument Creek flows through an embankment with a depth of approximately 150 feet (46 m). A 36-inch (0.9-meter) water main has crossed Monument Creek, elevated at a height of 50 feet (15 m) above the creek. Mount Pisgah is in the watershed of the creek.

== Watershed ==
Monument Creek is entirely within the United States Geological Survey quadrangle of Avoca. The creek is situated approximately 5 miles (8.0 km) from the community of Avoca.

== History ==
Monument Creek was entered into the Geographic Names Information System on August 2, 1979. Its identifier in the Geographic Names Information System is 1199184.

In the late 1800s, the water tank of the Wilkes-Barre and Eastern Railroad was located near Monument Creek.

The Pennsylvania American Water Company has a permit for encroachment to modify or maintain an aerial utility line that crosses Monument Creek in Pittston Township, Luzerne County. They also have a permit to repair 90 feet (27 m) of the creek's streambank and install riprap.

== Biology ==
Monument Creek is considered to be a High-Quality Coldwater Fishery.

== See also ==
- Covey Swamp Creek, next tributary of Spring Brook going downstream
- Green Run (Spring Brook), next tributary of Spring Brook going upstream
- List of rivers of Pennsylvania
- List of tributaries of the Lackawanna River
