= Panther Creek (Spring Brook tributary) =

Physical characteristics
- Source
  - location: west of Panther Hill in Thornhurst Township, Pennsylvania
  - elevation: between 1,900 and 1,920 feet (580 and 590 m)
- Mouth
  - location: Spring Brook in Spring Brook Township, Pennsylvania
  - coordinates: 41°17′30″N 75°37′15″W
  - elevation: 1,309 ft (399 m)
- Length: 2.7 mi (4.3 km)
- Basin size: 7.18 sq mi (18.6 km^{2})

Basin features
- Progression: Spring Brook → Lackawanna River → Susquehanna River → Chesapeake Bay
- Tributaries
  - left: Painter Creek

Panther Creek is a tributary of Spring Brook in Lackawanna County, Pennsylvania, in the United States. It is approximately 2.7 miles (4.3 km) long and flows through Thornhurst Township, Clifton Township, and Spring Brook Township. The watershed of the creek has an area of 7.18 square miles (18.6 km^{2}). It has one named tributary, which is known as Painter Creek. Panther Creek is considered to be Class A Wild Trout Waters. The surficial geology in its vicinity consists of alluvium, alluvial terrace, Wisconsinan Till, and bedrock.

== Course ==
Panther Creek begins to the west of Panther Hill in Thornhurst Township. It flows north for several tenths of a mile, passing through Clifton Township for a few hundred feet and entering Spring Brook Township. The creek then turns north-northeast for a few tenths of a mile, entering a valley. At this point, it turns north-northwest for several tenths of a mile and receives Painter Creek, its only named tributary, from the left. It then flows in a northwesterly direction for several tenths of a mile to its confluence with Spring Brook.

Panther Creek joins Spring Brook 10.40 miles (16.74 km) upstream of its mouth.

=== Tributaries ===
Panther Creek has one named tributary, which is known as Painter Creek. Painter Creek joins Panther Creek 0.90 square miles (2.3 km^{2}) upstream of its mouth. Its watershed has an area of 4.51 square miles (11.7 km^{2}).

== Hydrology ==
The concentration of alkalinity in Panther Creek is 4 milligrams per liter.

== Geography and geology ==
The elevation near the mouth of Panther Creek is 1,309 feet (399 m) above sea level. The elevation of the creek's source is between 1,900 and 1,920 feet (580 and 590 m) above sea level.

The surficial geology along the lower reaches of Panther Creek consists of alluvium and alluvial terrace. Bedrock containing conglomeratic sandstone, sandstone, and shale is present slightly further from the creek, as is a glacial or resedimented till known as Wisconsinan Till. Further upstream, the surficial geology consists of bedrock consisting of conglomerate, shale, and sandstone. Wisconsinan Till is also present in some areas.

== Watershed ==
The watershed of Panther Creek has an area of 7.18 square miles (18.6 km^{2}). The watershed is in the southwestern part of the Lackawanna River watershed. It is mostly in Spring Brook Township and Thornhurst Township. However, a small corner is in Clifton Township and an even smaller area is in Bear Creek Township, in Luzerne County. The mouth of the creek is in the United States Geological Survey quadrangle of Moscow. However, its source is in the quadrangle of Avoca.

A total of 97 percent of the length of Panther Creek is on public land that is open to access. The remaining 3 percent is on private land that is closed to access. The Theta Land Corp. owned land along the creek, but opened it to be public in 2002 by leasing it to the Pennsylvania Fish and Boat Commission for $1 per year.

== History and recreation ==
Panther Creek was entered into the Geographic Names Information System on August 2, 1979. Its identifier in the Geographic Names Information System is 1183249.

The first sawmill in Spring Brook Township was constructed near the confluence of Panther Creek with Spring Brook, on the latter stream. In the early 2000s, the Lackawanna River Watershed Conservation Plan recommended that Spring Brook Township include protection of Panther Creek in their comprehensive plans, as well as their ordinances for land use, zoning, and subdivision.

Catch and release fishing is permitted on the entire length of Panther Creek.

== Biology ==
Wild trout naturally reproduce in Panther Creek from its headwaters downstream to its mouth. They also do so in the tributary Painter Creek. The entire length of Panther Creek is considered by the Pennsylvania Fish and Boat Commission to be Class A Wild Trout Waters for brook trout.

== See also ==
- Plank Bridge Creek, next tributary of Spring Brook going upstream
- List of rivers of Pennsylvania
- List of tributaries of the Lackawanna River
