= Spring Brook (Lackawanna River tributary) =

River in the United States of America

Spring Brook Spring Brook Creek
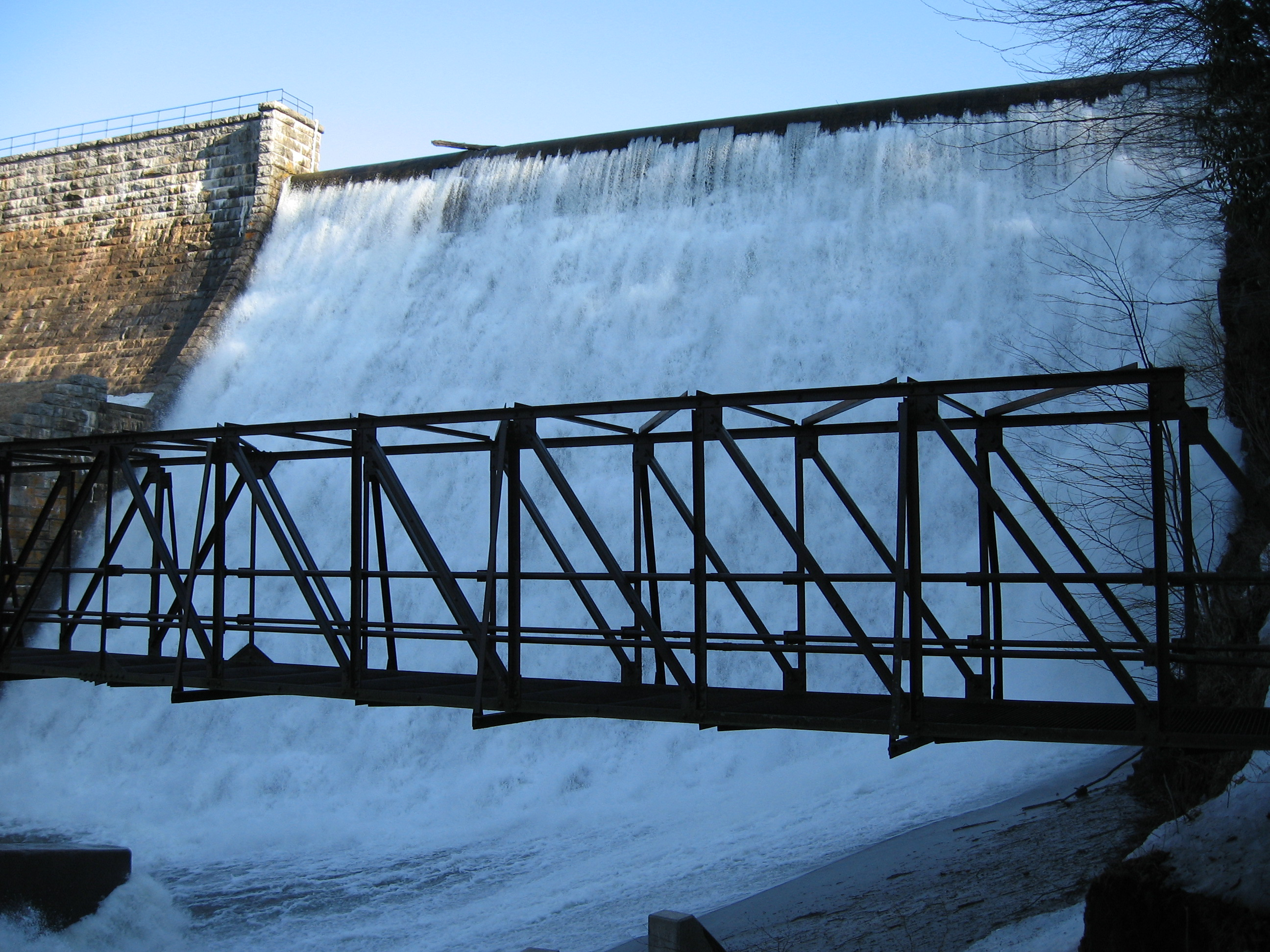
- Falls at the Nesbitt Reservoir on Spring Brook

Physical characteristics
- Source
  - location: Near Interstate 380 in Covington Township, Lackawanna County, Pennsylvania
  - elevation: 1,860 ft (570 m)
- Mouth
  - location: Lackawanna River in Moosic, Lackawanna County, Pennsylvania
  - coordinates: 41°21′26″N 75°44′14″W
  - elevation: 617 ft (188 m)
- Length: 17 mi (27 km)
- Basin size: 57.2 mi^{2} (148 km^{2})

Basin features
- Progression: Lackawanna River → Susquehanna River → Chesapeake Bay
- Tributaries
  - left: Panther Creek, Plank Bridge Creek, Monument Creek
  - right: Rattlesnake Creek, Green Run, Covey Swamp Creek

Spring Brook (also known as Spring Brook Creek) is a tributary of the Lackawanna River in Lackawanna County and Luzerne County, in Pennsylvania, in the United States. It is approximately 17 miles (27 km) long and flows through Covington Township, Spring Brook Township, and Moosic in Lackawanna County and Pittston Township in Luzerne County. The watershed of the stream has an area of 57.2 square miles (148 km^{2}). It is designated as a High-Quality Coldwater Fishery and a Migratory Fishery above Interstate 476 and as a Coldwater Fishery and a Migratory Fishery below it. A section is also designated as Class A Wild Trout Waters. The stream's tributaries include Panther Creek, Plank Bridge Creek, Rattlesnake Creek, Green Run, Monument Creek, and Covey Swamp Creek. It has a relatively high level of water quality and is very slightly acidic, with a pH of 6.4 to 6.9.

The upper reaches of the watershed of Spring Brook are mountainous and swampy. Further downstream, the stream flows through a water gap in the Moosic Mountains. Sandstone, shale, and some coal are present in the vicinity of the stream. It has been channelized in a concrete channel for part of its length and is the main source of flooding in Spring Brook Township, Lackawanna County. The stream is the second-largest tributary of the Lackawanna River. Reservoirs on Spring Brook include the Spring Brook Intake, the Nesbitt Reservoir, the Watres Reservoir. There are three dams on the stream. The watershed is mainly forested, with only a small amount of urban land.

In the past, industries in the watershed of Spring Brook included timbering, coal mining, and agriculture. Two railroads also passed through the watershed in the early 1900s, at least one of which was established by the 1880s. The stream's watershed has served as a water supply since at least the early 1900s and still serves as a water supply for the Lackawanna Valley. Several bridges have also been constructed across the stream in the 20th century. The stream has been part of several studies since 1970. Part of its length is navigable by kayaking, paddling, and rafting.

== Course ==
Spring Brook begins near Interstate 380 in Covington Township, Lackawanna County. It flows south for a short distance before meandering west for a few miles, crossing Interstate 380 and entering Spring Brook Township. The stream then turns south for several tenths of a mile before turning northwest for several tenths of a mile. It turns southwest before turning north-northwest and flowing around The Hogback. On the northern side of that hill, the stream turns south and then northwest, entering the Watres Reservoir. The stream exits the reservoir on its western side and flows northwest for a few miles, passing Pinnacle Hill and receiving the tributaries Panther Creek and Plank Bridge Creek from the left. It eventually bends east and enters the Nesbitt Reservoir after crossing Pennsylvania Route 502. Here, it receives the tributary Rattlesnake Creek from the right and flows between high hills. On the northern side of the reservoir, the stream flows north, receiving the tributary Green Run from the right before turning west-southwest. A few miles further downstream, it passes through the Spring Brook Intake before exiting Lackawanna County.

Upon exiting Lackawanna County, Spring Brook enters Pittston Township, Luzerne County. It receives the tributary Monument Creek from the left and turns north-northwest for a few miles, flowing alongside Pennsylvania Route 502. On this stretch, it leaves behind the hills that it flows through, crosses Pennsylvania Route 502, and exits Luzerne County. Upon exiting Luzerne County, the stream enters Moosic, Lackawanna County and continues flowing north-northwest and receives the tributary Covey Swamp Creek from the right. The stream then turns west-southwest for a short distance before turning south and then west, crossing Interstate 81. It then turns northwest for a few tenths of a mile, crossing US Route 11 before reaching its confluence with the Lackawanna River.

Spring Brook joins the Lackawanna River 3.62 miles (5.83 km) upriver of its mouth.

=== Tributaries ===
Spring Brook has numerous named tributaries: Panther Creek, Plank Bridge Creek, Rattlesnake Creek, Green Run, Monument Creek, and Covey Swamp Creek. Panther Creek joins Spring Brook 10.40 miles (16.74 km) upstream of its mouth. Its watershed has an area of 7.18 square miles (18.6 km^{2}). Plank Bridge Creek joins Spring Brook 8.65 miles (13.92 km) upstream of its mouth. Its watershed has an area of 1.26 square miles (3.3 km^{2}). Rattlesnake Creek joins Spring Brook 7.96 miles (12.81 km) upstream of its mouth. Its watershed has an area of 9.18 square miles (23.8 km^{2}). Green Run reaches its confluence with Spring Brook 6.48 miles (10.43 km) upstream of its mouth. Its watershed has an area of 4.32 square miles (11.2 km^{2}). Spring Brook also has numerous unnamed tributaries.

== Hydrology ==
Spring Brook experiences noticeable flow loss. As of 2009, it has high levels of sodium and alkalinity. Pittson Township and the borough of Moosic have permits to discharge stormwater into it. However, the water quality and habitat quality of the stream are relatively unimpacted. The stream has relatively high water quality even where it flows through a concrete channel. In a study by the Susquehanna River Basin Commission, it was found not to fail any water quality standards either during base flow or storm flow conditions. However, a study from the previous year found concentrations of sodium and alkalinity exceeding the threshold for concern. In the early 1900s, Spring Brook was a clear stream in its upper reaches. However, by the time it reached the property of the Du Pont Powder Company, it was affected by slush pumped into it by the Pennsylvania Coal Company.

Between 1971 and 1990, the streamflow of Spring Brook ranged from 0.900 to 27.0 cubic feet per second. The discharge ranged from 0.06 to 22 cubic feet per second in the 1970s. The gage height of the stream in the 1970s ranged from 4.72 to 6.35 feet (1.44 to 1.94 m). The peak annual discharge of the stream at its mouth has a 10 percent chance of reaching 5050 cubic feet per second. It has a 2 percent chance of reaching 10,900 cubic feet per second and a 1 percent chance of reaching 14,700 cubic feet per second. The peak annual discharge has a 0.2 percent chance of reaching 29,500 cubic feet per second.

The concentration of dissolved oxygen in Spring Brook at the community of Spring Brook was measured to be 10.6 milligrams per liter in 1975. The concentration of hydrogen ions was measured to range from 0.00013 to 0.00040 milligrams per liter in the 1970s. The concentration of carbon dioxide ranged from 2.2 to 6.2 milligrams per liter and the bicarbonate concentration ranged from 9 to 12 milligrams per liter. The sulfate concentration in Spring Brook ranged from 12.0 to 19.0 milligrams per liter. The chloride concentration ranged between 3.7 and 8.0 milligrams per liter.

The concentration of organic nitrogen in Spring Brook at the community of Spring Brook was measured to be 0.09 milligrams per liter in 1975. The concentration of ammonia in the form of nitrogen was measured to be 0.040 milligrams per liter. The concentration of nitrates in the form of nitrogen was 0.74 milligrams per liter and the concentration of nitrites in the form of nitrogen ranged from 0.045 to 0.29 milligrams per liter in 1971.

The concentration of sodium and potassium (as Na) in Spring Brook ranged from 1.4 to 3.9 milligrams per liter. The concentration of magnesium ranged from 0.90 to 1.60 milligrams per liter and the calcium concentration ranged from 7.30 to 8.80 milligrams per liter. The concentration of recoverable iron in the stream was measured to be 60 micrograms per liter in 1975.

The concentration of alkalinity in the waters of Spring Brook between the Watres Dam and the Nesbitt Reservoir is 11 milligrams per liter. In the 1970s, the stream's pH ranged from 6.4 to 6.9. The total concentration of water hardness ranged from 23 to 28 milligrams per liter. The turbidity of the stream at the community of Spring Brook was one measured to be less than 5 Jackson Turbidity Units. The specific conductance of the stream ranged from 60 to 78 micro-siemens per centimeter at 25 °C (77 °F) during five measurements in the 1970s. The concentration of dissolved solids in the stream was measured to be 54 milligrams per liter in 1975.

== Geography, geology, and climate ==
The elevation near the mouth of Spring Brook is 617 feet (188 m) above sea level. The elevation of the stream's source is approximately 1,860 feet (570 m) above sea level. The gradient of the creek is 77.3 feet (23.6 m) per mile.

The topography of the watershed of Spring Brook is mainly mountainous, with swampy land in its upper reaches. Some bogs are also present in this area. Wetlands near the stream's headwaters include the Yostville marshes. In the stream's middle and lower reaches, its valley is flanked by steep, high mountains. Its channel is sinuous and flows through rock formations consisting of sandstone and shale. There is also some coal in the lower reaches of the watershed. There are some culm dumps along the stream between Pennsylvania Route 502 and US Route 11.

Spring Brook flows across the Pocono Plateau and passes through the Moosic Mountains via a water gap known as the Spring Brook Gap. Its mouth is in the Lackawanna Valley. In its lower reaches, the stream is channelized in a large open concrete channel. A number of bank stabilization projects have been done on the stream from Belin Village downstream to its mouth. Some land in the vicinity of the stream is designated as a 100 year floodplain.

There are a number of dams on Spring Brook. One of these is the Spring Brook Intake Dam, which was determined in 1980 to be in good condition. Another is the Nesbitt Dam and a third is the Watres Dam.

Most of the Group A and Group B soils in Spring Brook Township, Lackawanna County are located along Spring Brook. These soils groups consist mainly of Pope soils.

The average annual rate of precipitation in the watershed of Spring Brook is between 35 and 40 inches (89 and 102 cm). The water temperature of the stream at the community of Spring Brook ranged from 8.0 to 15.5 °C (46.4 to 59.9 °F) in five measurements during the 1970s.

== Watershed ==
The watershed of Spring Brook has an area of 57.2 square miles (148 km^{2}). The watershed is in southern Lackawanna County and northeastern Luzerne County. It is in the lower part of the Lackawanna River watershed, in its south-central and southwestern section. The watershed is part of the North Pocono Watershed region of the Lackawanna River watershed. The mouth of the stream is in the United States Geological Survey quadrangle of Avoca. However, its source is in the quadrangle of Moscow. The creek mainly flows in a northwesterly direction.

Spring Brook is the second-largest tributary of the Lackawanna River, after Roaring Brook. It is a third-order stream. A significant portion of the watershed is forested. However, some residential areas, such as Yostville, Maple Lake, and Spring Brook Village are in the stream's vicinity. The stream also flows through an urban area in Moosic. Its headwaters are near Yostville. However, only a few square miles of the watershed is urban. Approximately 60 percent of the stream's watershed is owned by the Theta Company as of 2006.

Reservoirs and ponds in the watershed of Spring Brook include the Spring Brook Intake, the Nesbitt Reservoir, the Watres Reservoir, and Maple Lake. The first three are used as drinking water reservoirs and the lakes also serve as flood protection. The Pennsylvania American Water Company owns all four lakes and several hundred acres of the surrounding land. There are flood levees at the mouth of the stream. There is some evidence of coal mining on a ridge overlooking the area in the stream's vicinity. However, residential encroachment on the stream's floodplain is a more significant environmental concern.

Spring Brook is the main source of flooding in Spring Brook Township, Lackawanna County.

== History and industries ==
Spring Brook was entered into the Geographic Names Information System on August 2, 1979. Its identifier in the Geographic Names Information System is 1188206.

Spring Brook provided power for early lumbering in Spring Brook Township, Lackawanna County. In the early 1900s, the main industries in the watershed of Spring Brook included coal mining and agriculture. The Pennsylvania Coal Company historically had a washery that discharged into the stream. The Du Pont Powder Company also operated in the watershed at that time. A railroad line along the stream was present by the 1880s. The Wilkes-Barre and Eastern Railroad also crossed the stream's watershed and the Scranton and Spring Brook Railroad followed the stream between Rockdale and its mouth. During this time period, major communities in the watershed included Moosic, which had a population of 3964 at the time. The main stem and several tributaries were also historically used as a water supply by the Spring Brook Water Supply Company. The stream is still used as an important water supply in the Lackawanna Valley, as of 2001. Together with Roaring Brook and Stafford Meadow Brook, it serves as a water supply to a substantial part of the valley. Some areas of the watershed have been subjected to extensive timbering programs as recently as 2001. The Nesbitt Water Filtration Plant is in the watershed, in Pittston Township, Luzerne County. It is owned by the Pennsylvania American Water Company.

Spring Brook flooded during Hurricane Diane in 1955, reaching a discharge of 10,300 cubic feet per second (290 m^{3}/s) near Moosic and destroying three homes and inundating the basements and first floors of many others. The Pennsylvania Department of Environmental Protection constructed a levee on the stream after this flooding event. The stream also experienced bank failure during floods in October 1985 and January 1996. It also flooded homes and trailers in its vicinity.

A two-span steel stringer/multi-beam or girder bridge carrying Main Street/State Route 3024 over Spring Brook was built in 1956. It is 111.9 feet (34.1 m) long and is situated in Moosic. Another bridge of the same type was built over the stream in 1957. This bridge is 155.8 feet (47.5 m) long and is in Pittston Township. A two-span prestressed box beam or girders bridge was built over the stream in Moosic in 1958. It is 138.1 feet (42.1 m) long and carries Pennsylvania Route 502. Another bridge of the same type (but with only one span) was built in Moosic in 1959 and repaired in 1985. It carries US Route 11 and is 67.9 feet (20.7 m) long. In 1961, a two-span steel stringer/multi-beam or girder bridge was built over the stream in Moosic. It is 180.1 feet (54.9 m) long and carries Pennsylvania Route 502. A prestressed box beam carrying Pennsylvania Route 502 over the stream was constructed in 1987. This bridge is in Pittston Township and has a length of 27.9 feet (8.5 m).

Spring Brook has been studied several times. It was studied by the United States Geological Survey from 1971 to 1975, by Daniels (working for the Pennsylvania Fish and Boat Commission) in 1976, by Rider and Blacksmith (working for the Pennsylvania Department of Environmental Protection) in 1985, by Copeland (working for the Pennsylvania Fish and Boat Commission) in 1992, by Moase (working for the Pennsylvania Fish and Boat Commission) in 1993, and Popp and McGurl in 2003. The stream is on the Pennsylvania Department of Environmental Protection Bureau of Abandoned Mine Restoration's priority list for restoration.

== Biology ==
The drainage basin of Spring Brook is designated as a High-Quality Coldwater Fishery and a Migratory Fishery from its headwaters downstream to the Northeast Extension of the Pennsylvania Turnpike (Interstate 476). From that point downstream to its mouth, the drainage basin of the stream is designated as a Coldwater Fishery and a Migratory Fishery. Wild trout naturally reproduce in Spring Brook from its headwaters downstream to its mouth. A 2.4-mile (4-kilometer) section of the stream from the Watres Dam downstream to the Nesbitt Reservoir is considered by the Pennsylvania Fish and Boat Commission to be Class A Wild Trout Waters for both brook trout and brown trout. The tributaries Green Run and Panther Creek are Class A Wild Trout Waters for brook trout and part of the tributary Rattlesnake Creek is Class A Wild Trout Waters for both brook trout and brown trout.

Numerous macroinvertebrate species have been observed in Spring Brook. A total of 18 genera are from the orders Ephemeroptera, Plecoptera, and Trichoptera. A short distance upstream of the Watres Reservoir, the most common genera taxa were the family Chironomidae and the genera Drunella, Ephemerella, and Hydropsyche. Of a 200-individual sample, 34, 28, 25, and 20 individuals of each taxon have been observed, respectively. Slightly less common are the genera Epeorus, Hexatoma, Leuctra, and Lepidostoma. Of the 200-individual sample, 15, 13, 11, and 10 individuals of each taxon have been observed, respectively. Still less common are the genera Baetis, Paraleptophlebia, Acroneuria, Stenonema, Nigronia, Agapetus, DoIophilodes, and Optioservus. In the 200-individual sample, 8, 6, 5, 4, 4, 3, 2, and 2 individuals of each taxon have been observed, respectively. Only one individual each of the genera Isonychia, Amphinemura, Cheumatopsyche, Rhycophila, Neophylax, Psephenus, Boyeria, Tabanus, and Cambarus were observed.

The wetlands at the headwaters of Spring Brook are home to boreal forest trees. These include black spruce, paper birch, and tamarack. Huckleberry, lady's slipper, leather leaf, mountain laurel, pitcher plant, and rhododendron plants inhabit bogs in the area.

The modified Hilsenhoff Biotic Index value of Spring Brook a short distance upstream of the Watres Reservoir is 2.56. The modified EPT Index value at this location is 15. The taxa richness value is 26.

== Recreation ==
A trail known as the Spring Brook / Wilkes-Barre and Eastern Greenway was proposed in the Lackawanna River Watershed Conservation Plan in 2001. There are plans for trails on the flood levee at the stream's mouth and on the old Wilkes-Barre and Eastern Railroad corridor.

A stretch of at least 7 miles (11 km) of Spring Brook are navigable by kayaking, paddling, or rafting. This stretch runs from the Nesbitt Reservoir to Moosic. The difficulty of the stream ranges from Class II to Class IV.

Spring Brook is an approved trout stream. In 1996, it was opened for trout fishing on April 29.

== See also ==
- Mill Creek (Lackawanna River), next tributary of the Lackawanna River going downriver
- Keyser Creek, next tributary of the Lackawanna River going upriver
- List of rivers of Pennsylvania
- List of tributaries of the Lackawanna River
