= Plank Bridge Creek =

Physical characteristics
- Source
  - location: mountain in Spring Brook Township, Pennsylvania
  - elevation: between 1,880 and 1,900 feet (570 and 580 m)
- Mouth
  - location: Spring Brook in Spring Brook Township, Pennsylvania
  - coordinates: 41°18′19″N 75°38′38″W
  - elevation: 1,188 ft (362 m)
- Length: 2.4 mi (3.9 km)
- Basin size: 1.26 mi^{2} (3.3 km^{2})

Basin features
- Progression: Spring Brook → Lackawanna River → Susquehanna River → Chesapeake Bay

Plank Bridge Creek is a tributary of Spring Brook in Lackawanna County, Pennsylvania, in the United States. It is approximately 2.4 miles (3.9 km) long and flows through Spring Brook Township. The watershed of the creek has an area of 1.26 square miles (3.3 km^{2}). It is inhabited by wild trout throughout its length. The surficial geology in its vicinity mainly consists of Wisconsinan Till, bedrock, Boulder Colluvium, alluvium, and wetlands.

== Course ==
Plank Bridge Creek begins on a mountain in Spring Brook Township. It flows northwest for several hundred feet before turning northeast. After a few tenths of a mile, it turns north for a few tenths of a mile before turning east-northeast and entering a valley between Pinnacle Hill and another hill. The creek then turns north-northeast for several tenths of a mile before turning west-northwest and flowing alongside Spring Brook to its confluence with Spring Brook.

Plank Bridge Creek joins Spring Brook 8.65 miles (13.92 km) upstream of its mouth.

== Geography and geology ==
The elevation near the mouth of Plank Bridge Creek is 1,188 feet (362 m) above sea level. The elevation of the creek's source is between 1,880 and 1,900 feet (570 and 580 m) above sea level.

The surficial geology in the vicinity of Plank Bridge Creek mainly consists of bedrock and a glacial or resedimented till known as Wisconsinan Till. The bedrock contains conglomerate, sandstone, and shale. However, small patches of alluvium, Boulder Colluvium (which contains numerous quartz, sandstone, and shale boulders), and wetlands are also present.

A hill known as Pinnacle Hill is in the watershed of Plank Bridge Creek.

== Watershed ==
The watershed of Plank Bridge Creek has an area of 1.26 square miles (3.3 km^{2}). The entirety of the watershed is situated in Spring Brook Township. The watershed is in the lower basin of the North Branch of the Susquehanna River. The creek is entirely within the United States Geological Survey quadrangle of Avoca.

== History ==
Plank Bridge Creek was entered into the Geographic Names Information System on August 2, 1979. Its identifier in the Geographic Names Information System is 1183996.

In the early 2000s, the Lackawanna River Watershed Conservation Plan recommended that Spring Brook Township include protection of Plank Bridge Creek in their comprehensive plans, as well as their ordinances for land use, zoning, and subdivision.

== Biology ==
Wild trout naturally reproduce in Plank Bridge Creek from its headwaters downstream to its mouth.

== See also ==
- Rattlesnake Creek (Spring Brook), next tributary of Spring Brook going downstream
- Panther Creek (Spring Brook), next tributary of Spring Brook going upstream
- List of rivers of Pennsylvania
- List of tributaries of the Lackawanna River
