= Epeorus permagnus =

Scientific classification
- Domain: Eukaryota
- Kingdom: Animalia
- Phylum: Arthropoda
- Class: Insecta
- Order: Ephemeroptera
- Family: Heptageniidae
- Genus: Epeorus
- Species: E. permagnus

Binomial name
- Epeorus permagnus (Traver, 1935)

Synonyms
- Ironopsis permagnus Traver, 1935

Species of mayfly

Epeorus permagnus is a species of flatheaded mayfly in the family Heptageniidae. It is found in North America.
