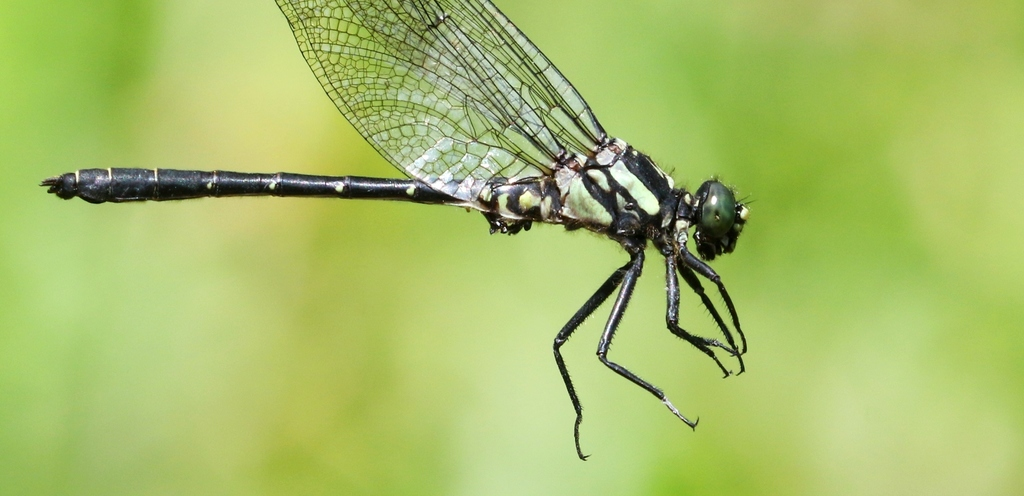
- male

Conservation status
- Least Concern (IUCN 3.1)

Scientific classification
- Kingdom: Animalia
- Phylum: Arthropoda
- Class: Insecta
- Order: Odonata
- Infraorder: Anisoptera
- Family: Gomphidae
- Genus: Lanthus
- Species: L. parvulus

Binomial name
- Lanthus parvulus (Selys, 1854)

= Lanthus parvulus =

Species of dragonfly

Lanthus parvulus, the northern pygmy clubtail, is a species of clubtail in the dragonfly family Gomphidae. It is found in North America.

The IUCN conservation status of Lanthus parvulus is "LC", least concern, with no immediate threat to the species' survival. The population is stable. The IUCN status was reviewed in 2018.

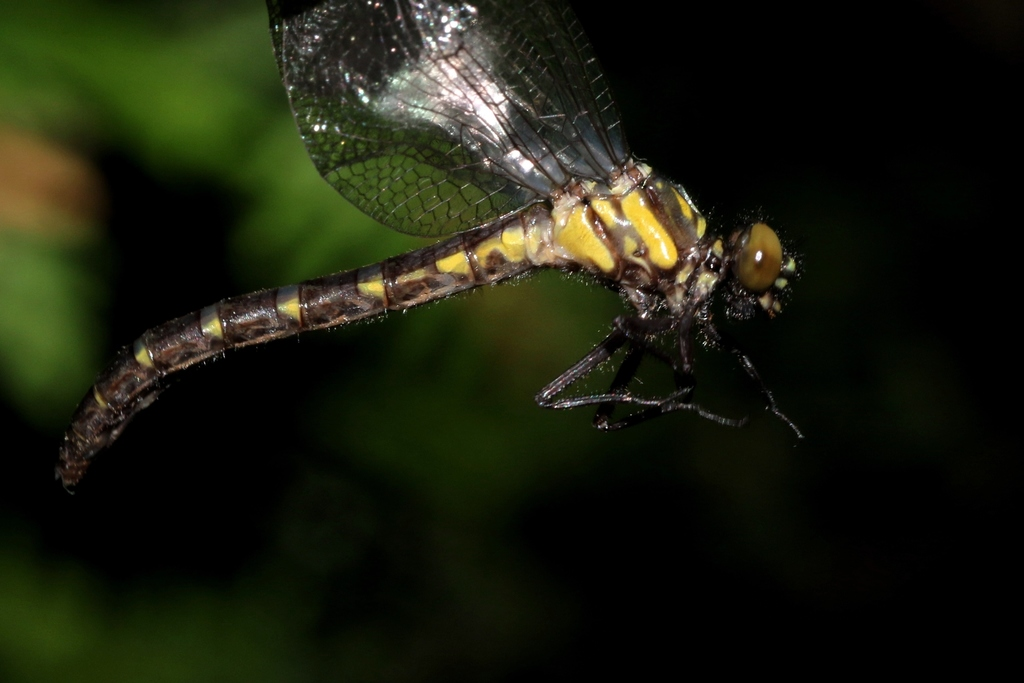
female
