= Epeorus longimanus =

Scientific classification
- Domain: Eukaryota
- Kingdom: Animalia
- Phylum: Arthropoda
- Class: Insecta
- Order: Ephemeroptera
- Family: Heptageniidae
- Genus: Epeorus
- Species: E. longimanus

Binomial name
- Epeorus longimanus (Eaton, 1885)

Synonyms
- Epeorus proprius (Traver, 1935); Iron longimanus Eaton, 1885; Iron proprius Traver, 1935

Species of mayfly

Epeorus longimanus is a species of flatheaded mayfly in the family Heptageniidae. It is found in North America.
