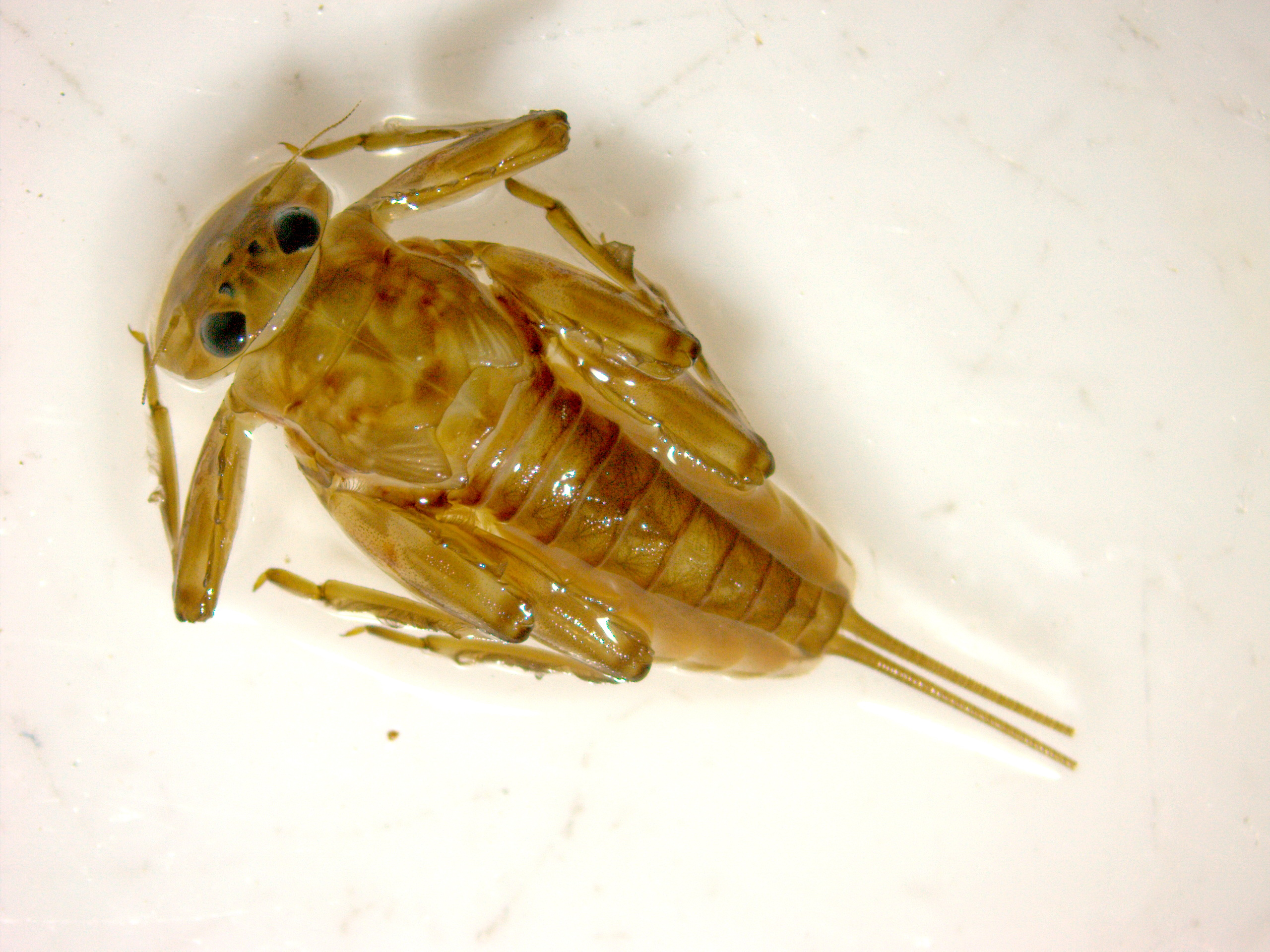

Scientific classification
- Domain: Eukaryota
- Kingdom: Animalia
- Phylum: Arthropoda
- Class: Insecta
- Order: Ephemeroptera
- Family: Heptageniidae
- Genus: Epeorus
- Species: E. sylvicola

Binomial name
- Epeorus sylvicola (Pictet, 1865)

= Epeorus sylvicola =

Species of mayfly

Epeorus sylvicola is a species of mayfly belonging to the family Heptageniidae.

The species is found in Europe and Western Asia. The larvae typically inhabit fast flowing waters and have rigid gill plates.
