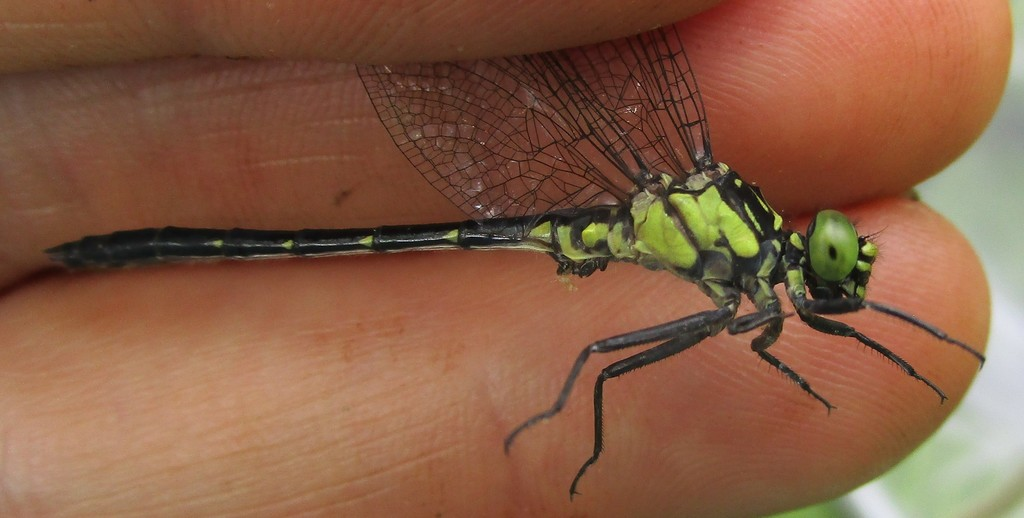
- side view

Conservation status
- Least Concern (IUCN 3.1)

Scientific classification
- Kingdom: Animalia
- Phylum: Arthropoda
- Class: Insecta
- Order: Odonata
- Infraorder: Anisoptera
- Family: Gomphidae
- Genus: Lanthus
- Species: L. vernalis

Binomial name
- Lanthus vernalis Carle, 1980

= Lanthus vernalis =

Species of dragonfly

Lanthus vernalis, the southern pygmy clubtail, is a species of clubtail in the family of dragonflies known as Gomphidae. It is found in eastern North America. One of the smallest of the clubtails, it is typically found near small, clear running trout streams. The larvae can live up to 5 years before emergence.

The IUCN conservation status of Lanthus vernalis is "LC", least concern, with no immediate threat to the species' survival. The population is stable.

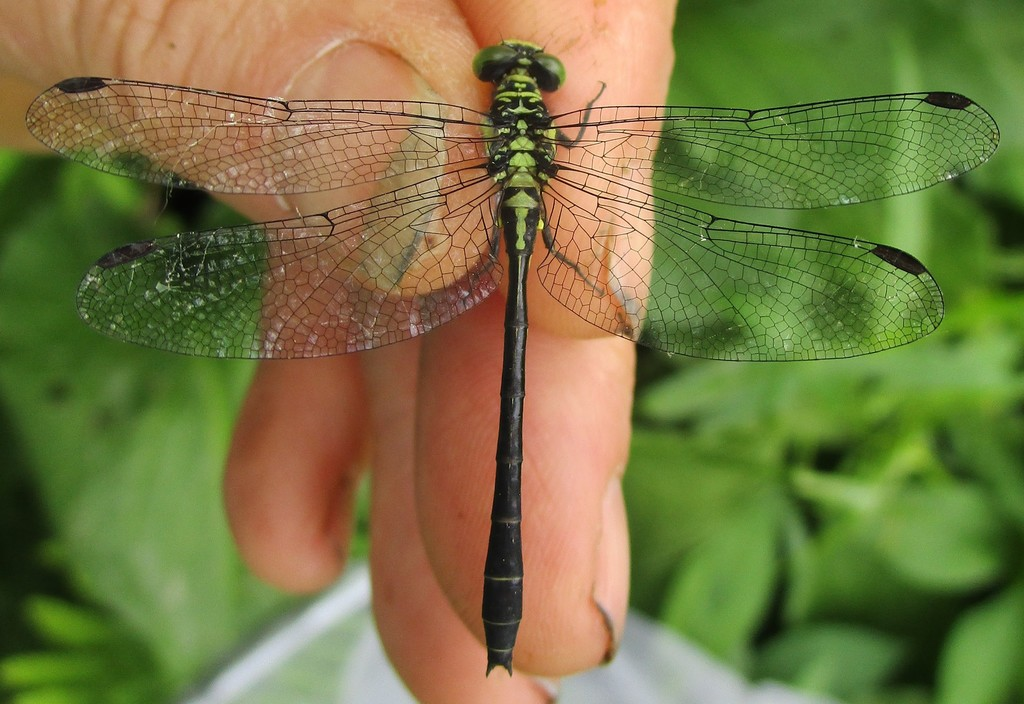
top view
