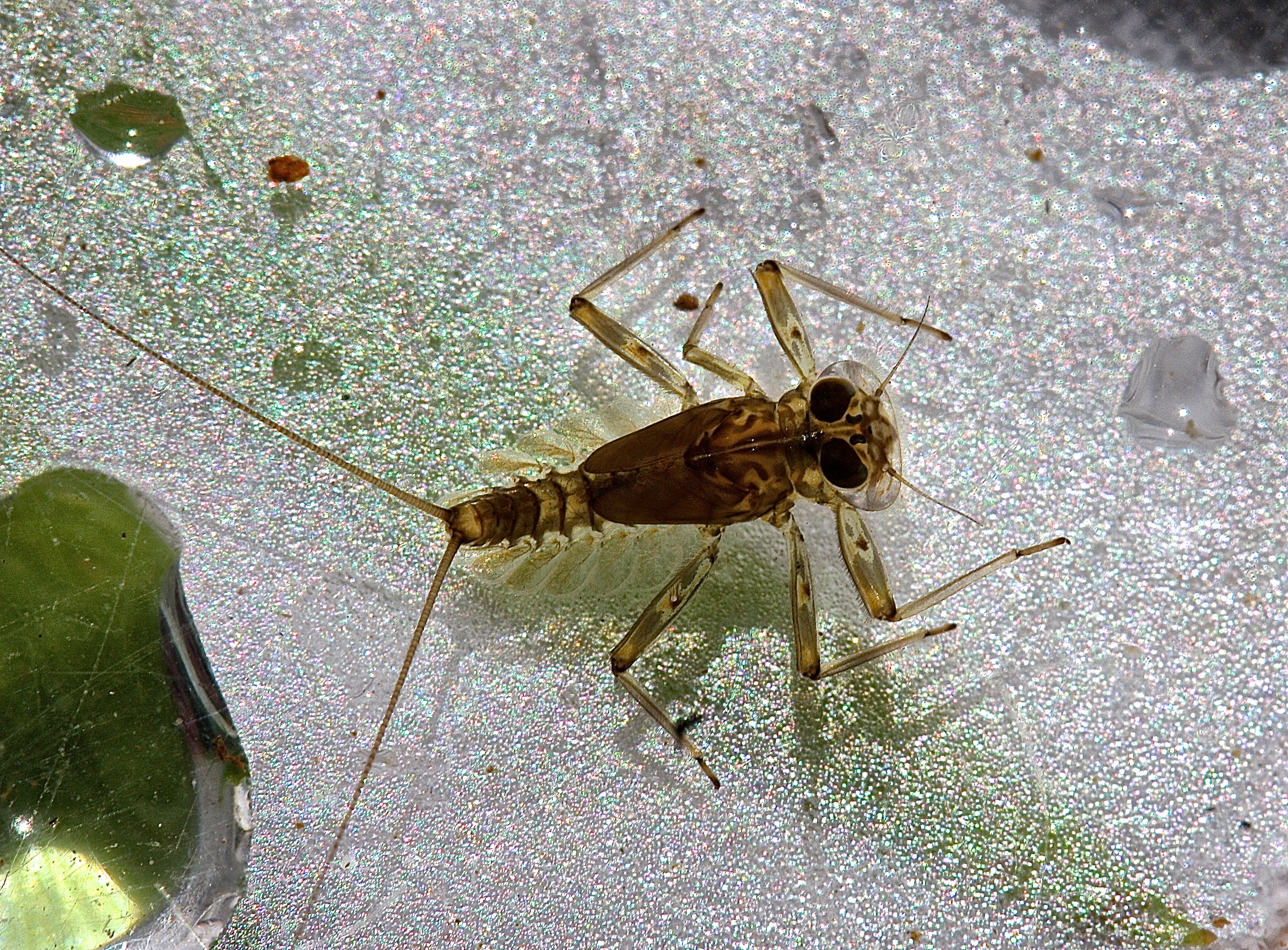

Scientific classification
- Domain: Eukaryota
- Kingdom: Animalia
- Phylum: Arthropoda
- Class: Insecta
- Order: Ephemeroptera
- Family: Heptageniidae
- Genus: Epeorus
- Species: E. fragilis

Binomial name
- Epeorus fragilis (Morgan, 1911)

Synonyms
- Iron fragilis Morgan, 1911; Iron tenuis Traver, 1935

= Epeorus fragilis =

Species of mayfly

Epeorus fragilis is a species of flatheaded mayfly in the family Heptageniidae. It is found in North America.
