= Covey Swamp Creek =

River in Pennsylvania, United States

Coordinates: 41.352056°N 75.713760°W

Covey Swamp Creek Covey Creek

Physical characteristics
- Source
  - location: hill in Moosic, Lackawanna County, Pennsylvania, not far from Scranton
  - elevation: between 1,080 and 1,100 feet (330 and 340 m)
- Mouth
  - location: Spring Brook in Moosic, Lackawanna County, Pennsylvania
  - elevation: 709 ft (216 m)
- Length: 2.2 mi (3.5 km)

Basin features
- Progression: Spring Brook → Lackawanna River → Susquehanna River → Chesapeake Bay

Covey Swamp Creek (also known as Covey Creek) is a tributary of Spring Brook in Lackawanna County, Pennsylvania, in the United States. It is approximately 2.2 miles (3.5 km) long and flows through Moosic. Dams in the watershed of the creek include the Glenwood Lake Dam, the Covey Dam, and the Stark Dam. All three dams have associated reservoirs. The creek is a small mountain stream.

== Course ==
Covey Swamp Creek begins on a hill in Moosic, not far from Scranton. It flows northwest for a few tenths of a mile, off the hill, before turning west-southwest for more than a mile, receiving an unnamed tributary from the left. The creek then turns south-southwest for a short distance before entering Glenwood Lake. It northwest for several tenths of a mile before turning west, crossing Interstate 476, and reaching its confluence with Spring Brook.

== Geography and geology ==
The elevation near the mouth of Covey Swamp Creek is 709 feet (216 m) above sea level. The elevation of the creek's source is between 1,080 and 1,100 feet (330 and 340 m) above sea level.

Covey Swamp Creek is a small mountain stream. Its headwaters are on Moosic Mountain.

Covey Swamp Creek is dammed by the Glenwood Lake Dam. It is a small dam that is in poor condition as of 1981. The Covey Reservoir and the Stark Reservoir are also in the watershed.

== Watershed ==
Covey Swamp Creek is entirely within the United States Geological Survey quadrangle of Avoca.

Covey Swamp Creek drains a swamp known as Covey Swamp. It also drains a glen known as Rocky Glen. The swamp is situated at an elevation of 1,060 feet (320 m) above sea level.

== History ==
Covey Swamp Creek was entered into the Geographic Names Information System on January 1, 1990. Its identifier in the Geographic Names Information System is 1202402. The creek appears on Patton's Philadelphia and Suburbs Street and Road Map, which was published in 1984. It is for this reason that it was added to the Geographic Names Information System.

The Covey Creek Coal Company was incorporated in 1900 in Moosic. Two dams in the watershed of Covey Swamp Creek were approved in 1917: Covey Dam and Stark Dam. Both were owned by the Spring Brook Water Supply Company.

== See also ==
- Monument Creek (Spring Brook), next tributary of Spring Brook going upstream
- List of rivers of Pennsylvania
- List of tributaries of the Lackawanna River
