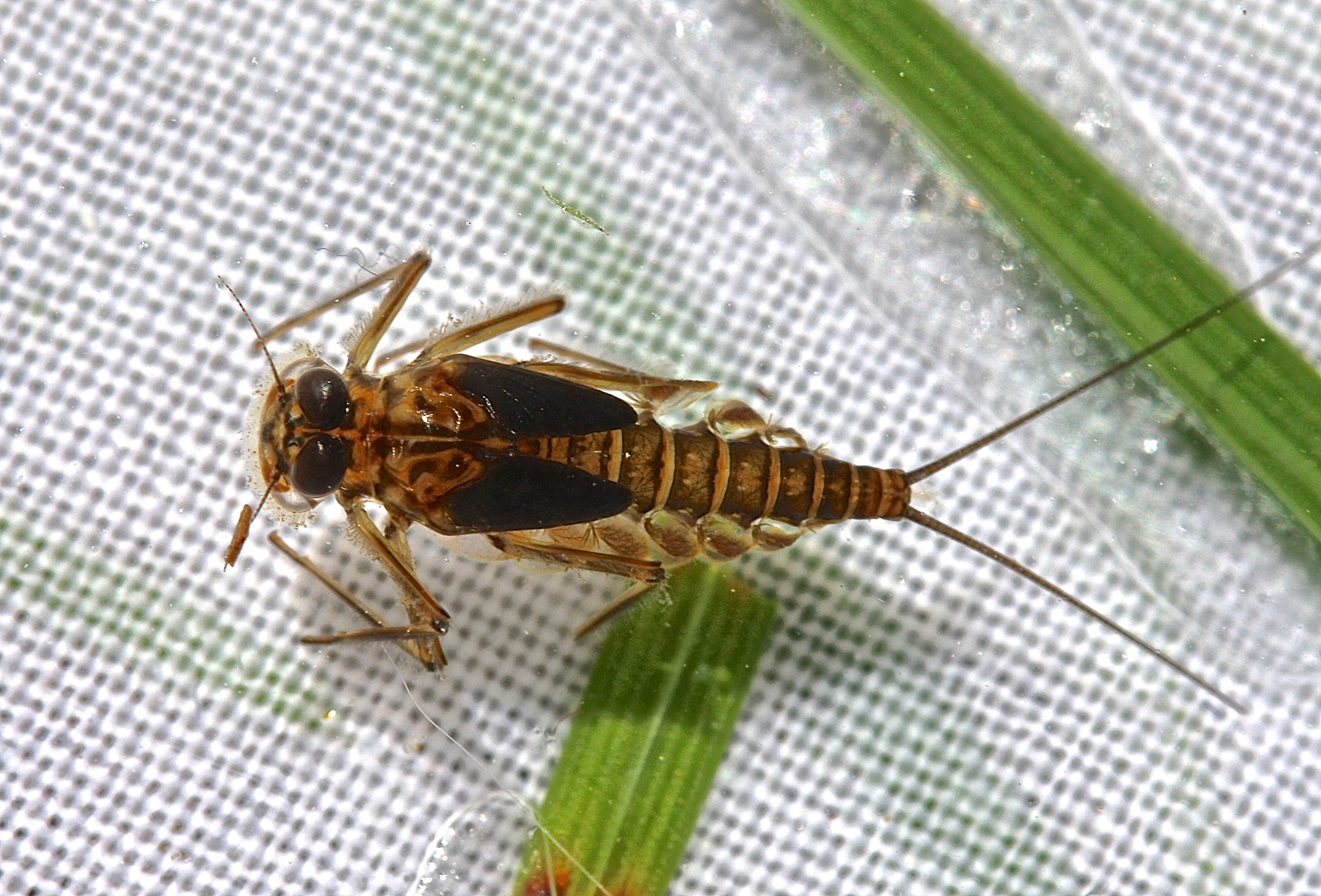

Scientific classification
- Domain: Eukaryota
- Kingdom: Animalia
- Phylum: Arthropoda
- Class: Insecta
- Order: Ephemeroptera
- Family: Heptageniidae
- Genus: Epeorus
- Species: E. deceptivus

Binomial name
- Epeorus deceptivus (McDunnough, 1924)

Synonyms
- Cinygma deceptiva McDunnough, 1924

= Epeorus deceptivus =

Species of mayfly

Epeorus deceptivus is a species of flatheaded mayfly in the family Heptageniidae. It is found in North America.
