= Epeorus namatus =

Scientific classification
- Domain: Eukaryota
- Kingdom: Animalia
- Phylum: Arthropoda
- Class: Insecta
- Order: Ephemeroptera
- Family: Heptageniidae
- Genus: Epeorus
- Species: E. namatus

Binomial name
- Epeorus namatus (Burks, 1946)

Synonyms
- Iron namatus Burks, 1946

Species of mayfly

Epeorus namatus is a species of flatheaded mayfly in the family Heptageniidae. It is found in North America.
