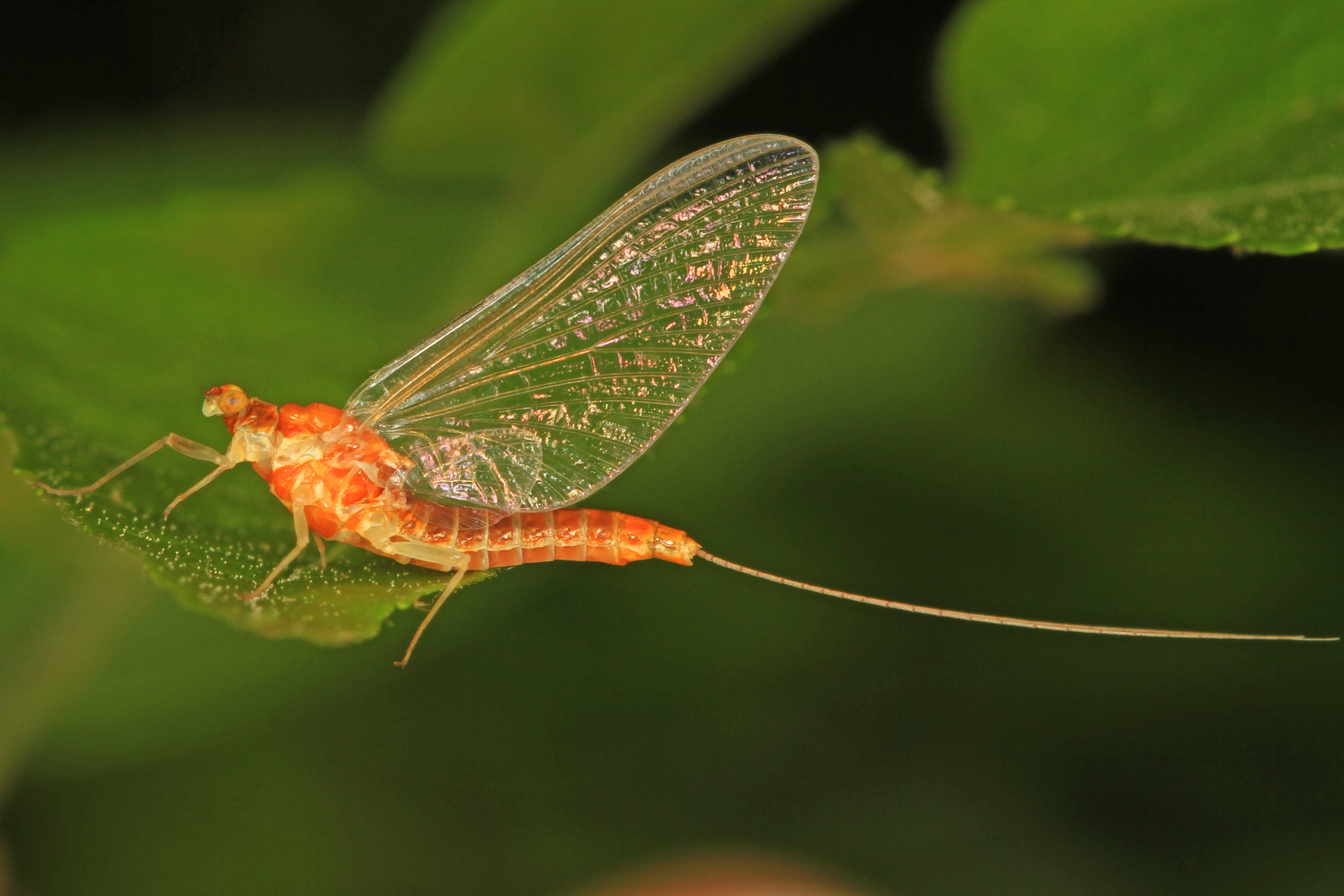

Scientific classification
- Domain: Eukaryota
- Kingdom: Animalia
- Phylum: Arthropoda
- Class: Insecta
- Order: Ephemeroptera
- Family: Heptageniidae
- Genus: Epeorus
- Species: E. vitreus

Binomial name
- Epeorus vitreus (Walker, 1853)

Synonyms
- Epeorus humeralis (Traver, 1933); Epeorus rubidus Morgan, 1911; Iron humeralis Traver, 1933; Iron rubidus (Morgan, 1911); Palingenia vitrea Walker, 1853

= Epeorus vitreus =

Species of mayfly

Epeorus vitreus is a species of flatheaded mayfly in the family Heptageniidae. It is found in southeastern Canada and the eastern United States.

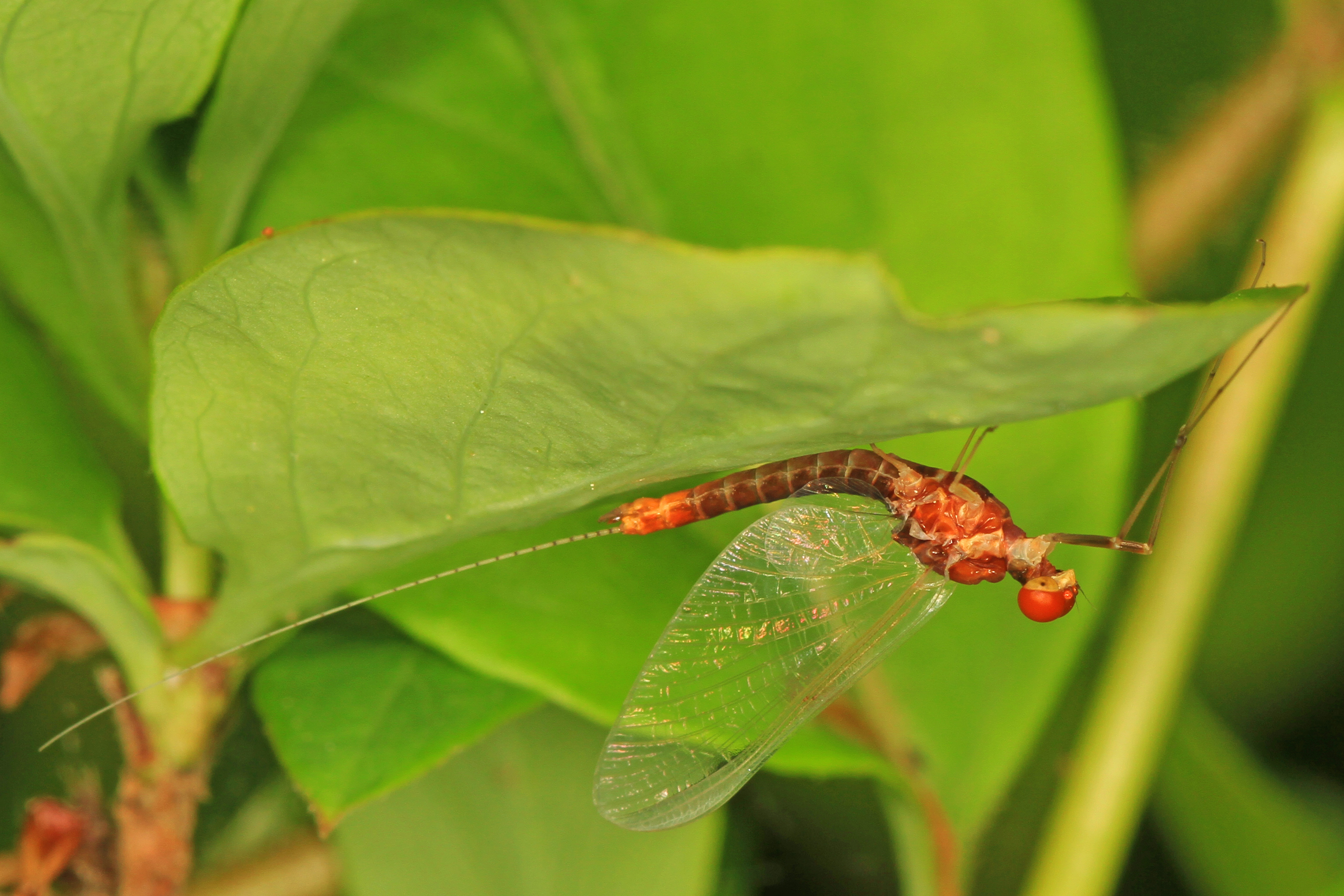
