= Epeorus dispar =

Scientific classification
- Domain: Eukaryota
- Kingdom: Animalia
- Phylum: Arthropoda
- Class: Insecta
- Order: Ephemeroptera
- Family: Heptageniidae
- Genus: Epeorus
- Species: E. dispar

Binomial name
- Epeorus dispar (Traver, 1933)

Synonyms
- Iron dispar Traver, 1933

Species of mayfly

Epeorus dispar is a species of flatheaded mayfly in the family Heptageniidae. It is found in North America.
