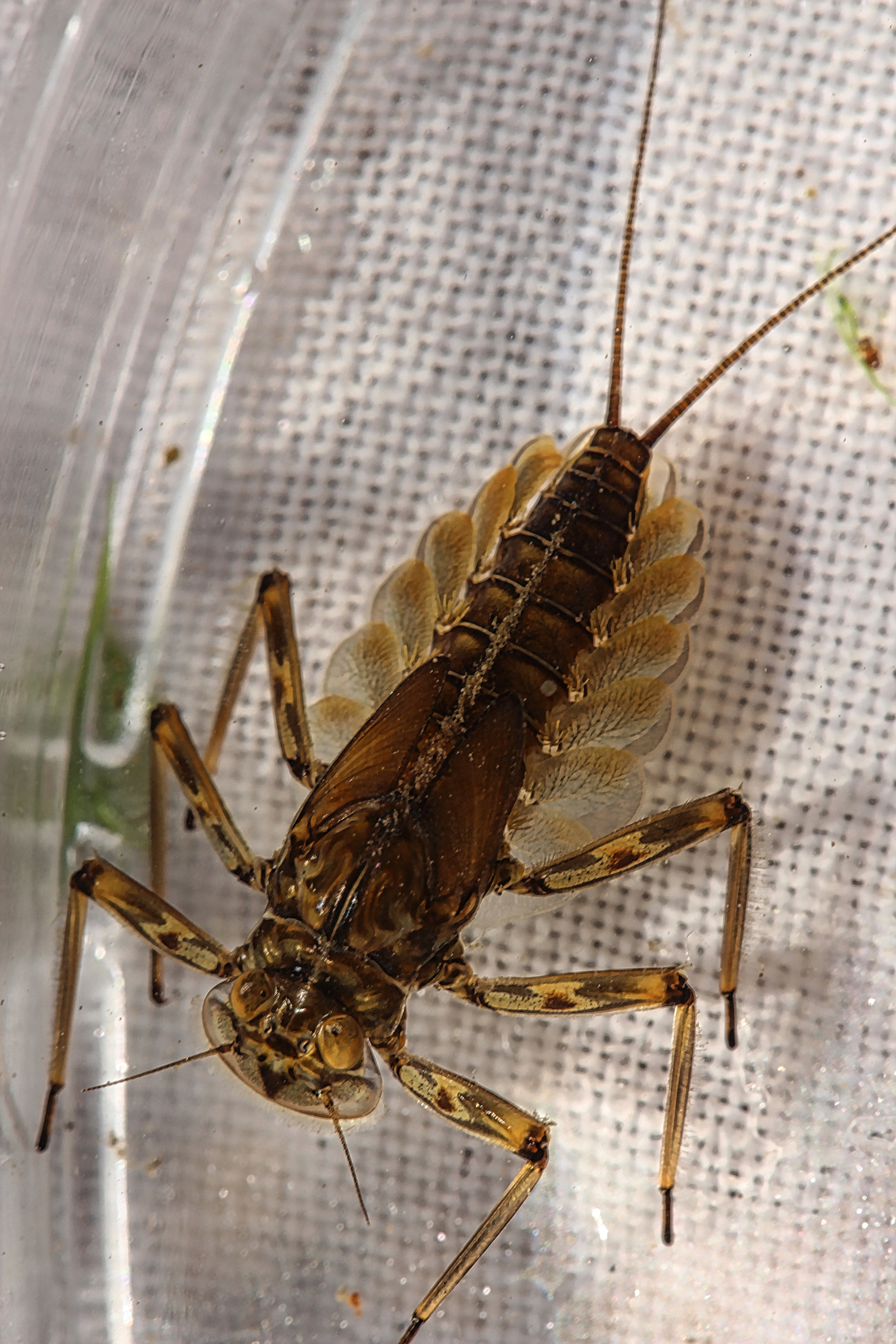
- Epeorus pleuralis

Scientific classification
- Domain: Eukaryota
- Kingdom: Animalia
- Phylum: Arthropoda
- Class: Insecta
- Order: Ephemeroptera
- Family: Heptageniidae
- Genus: Epeorus
- Species: E. pleuralis

Binomial name
- Epeorus pleuralis (Banks, 1910)

Synonyms
- Epeorus confusus (Traver, 1935); Epeorus fraudator (Traver, 1935); Heptagenia pleuralis Banks, 1910; Iron confusus Traver, 1935; Iron fraudator Traver, 1935

= Epeorus pleuralis =

Species of mayfly

Epeorus pleuralis, the quill gordon, is a species of flatheaded mayfly in the family Heptageniidae. It is found in North America.
