= Epeorus albertae =

Scientific classification
- Domain: Eukaryota
- Kingdom: Animalia
- Phylum: Arthropoda
- Class: Insecta
- Order: Ephemeroptera
- Family: Heptageniidae
- Genus: Epeorus
- Species: E. albertae

Binomial name
- Epeorus albertae (McDunnough, 1924)

Synonyms
- Epeorus youngi (Traver, 1935); Iron albertae McDunnough, 1924; Iron youngi Traver, 1935

Species of mayfly

Epeorus albertae is a species of flatheaded mayfly in the family Heptageniidae. It is found in all of Canada, the western United States, and Alaska.
