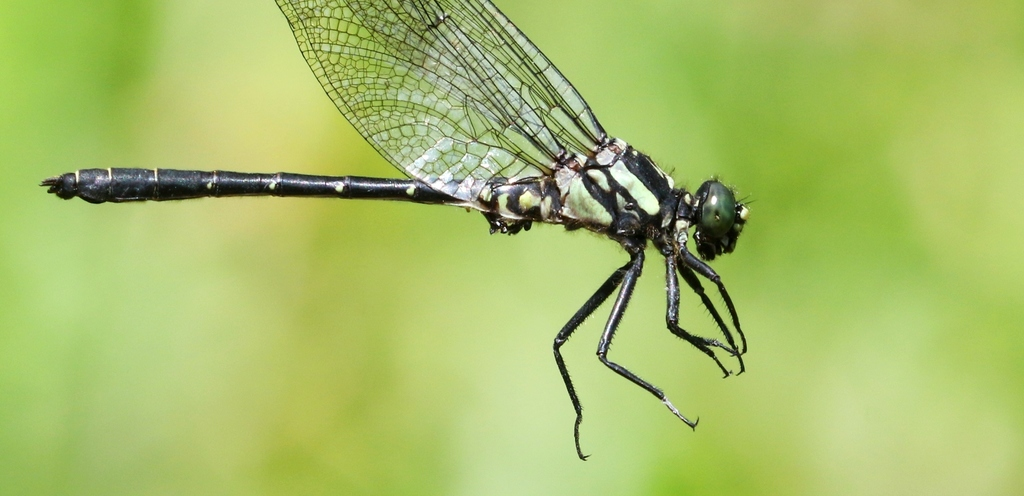
- Lanthus parvulus

Scientific classification
- Kingdom: Animalia
- Phylum: Arthropoda
- Class: Insecta
- Order: Odonata
- Infraorder: Anisoptera
- Family: Gomphidae
- Genus: Lanthus; Needham, 1897

= Lanthus =

Genus of dragonflies

Lanthus is a genus of club-tailed dragonflies found in North America, commonly called pygmy clubtails. They are found in Japan and North America. The species are clear winged with black bodies and yellow markings.

This genus includes the following species:

- Lanthus fujiacus (Fraser, 1936)
- Lanthus parvulus (Selys, 1854) – northern pygmy clubtail
- Lanthus vernalis Carle, 1980 – southern pygmy clubtail
