= Spring Brook, Pennsylvania =

Unincorporated community in Pennsylvania, US

- Unincorporated community
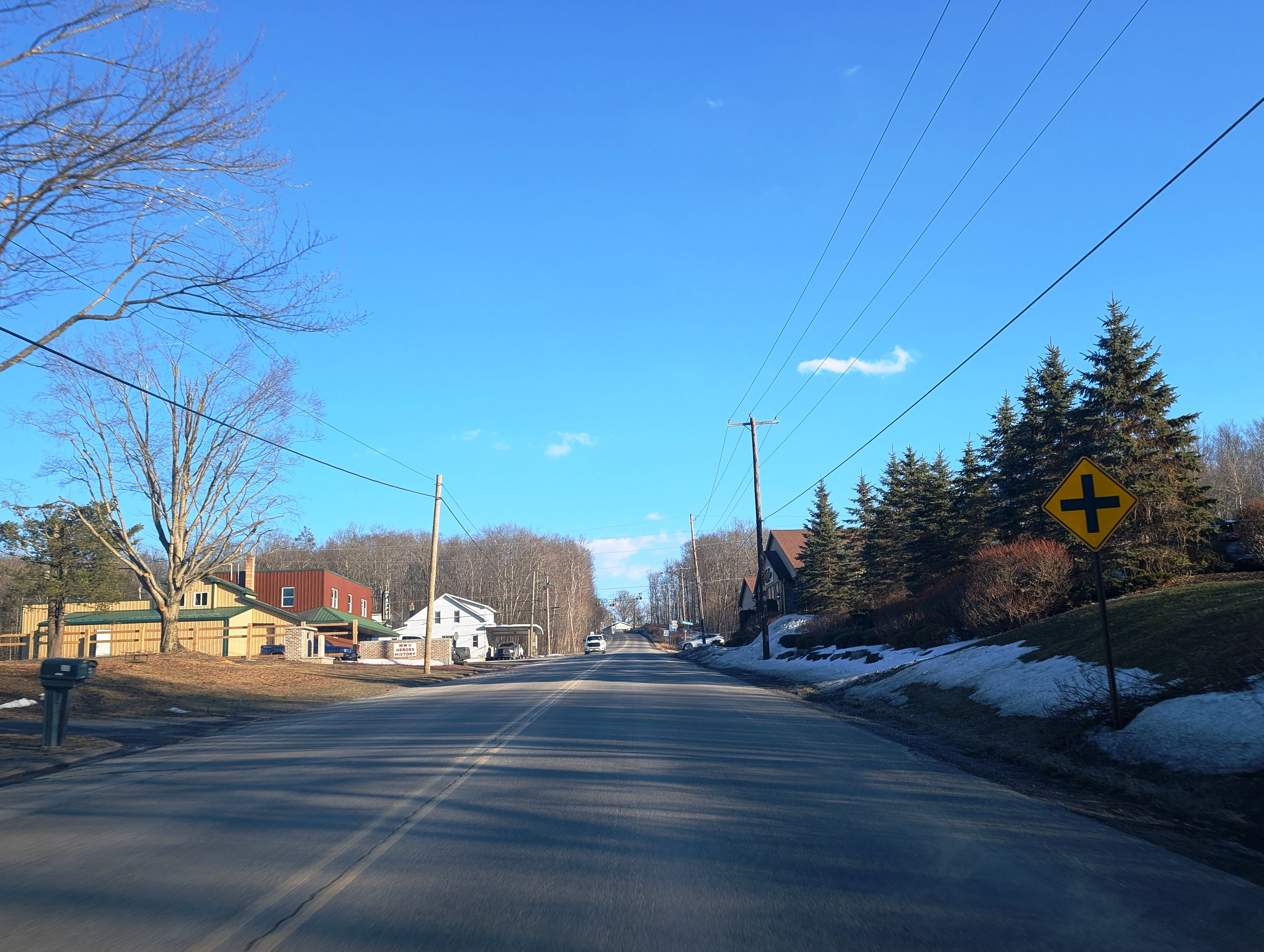
- PA 502 eastbound through Spring Brook

- Location within Pennsylvania Location within the United States
- Coordinates: 41°18′8″N 75°36′36″W
- Country: United States
- State: Pennsylvania
- County: Lackawanna
- Township: Spring Brook
- Elevation: 1,539 ft (469 m)
- Time zone: UTC-5 (Eastern (EST))
  - Summer (DST): UTC-4 (EDT)
- Area codes: 570 and 272
- GNIS feature ID: 1188205

Spring Brook is an unincorporated community in Spring Brook Township in Lackawanna County, Pennsylvania. Spring Brook is located at the intersection of state routes 502 and 690, southwest of Moscow.
