= Pennsylvania Route 502 =

State highway in Pennsylvania, US

Pennsylvania Route 502
- PA 502 highlighted in red

Route information
- Maintained by PennDOT
- Length: 13.776 mi (22.170 km)

Major junctions
- West end: US 11 in Moosic
- I-81 in Moosic; PA 690 in Spring Brook Township; PA 307 in Covington Township
- East end: PA 435 in Covington Township

Location
- Country: United States
- State: Pennsylvania
- Counties: Lackawanna, Luzerne

Highway system
- Pennsylvania State Route System; Interstate; US; State; Scenic; Legislative
← PA 501	→ PA 503

Pennsylvania Route 502 (PA 502) is a 13.8-mile-long (22.2 km) state highway located in Lackawanna and Luzerne counties in Pennsylvania. The western terminus is at U.S. Route 11 (US 11) in Moosic. The eastern terminus is at PA 435 in Covington Township. The route is a two-lane undivided road that runs through rural areas to the south of Scranton. From US 11, PA 502 comes to a northbound ramp to Interstate 81 (I-81) before winding through forested areas. Farther east, the route intersects the western terminus of PA 690 and crosses PA 307 before continuing to its eastern terminus at PA 435 in Daleville. PA 502 was designated in 1928 between US 11 in Moosic and US 611 (now PA 435) in Daleville along an unpaved road. The route was paved in the 1930s.

== Route description ==
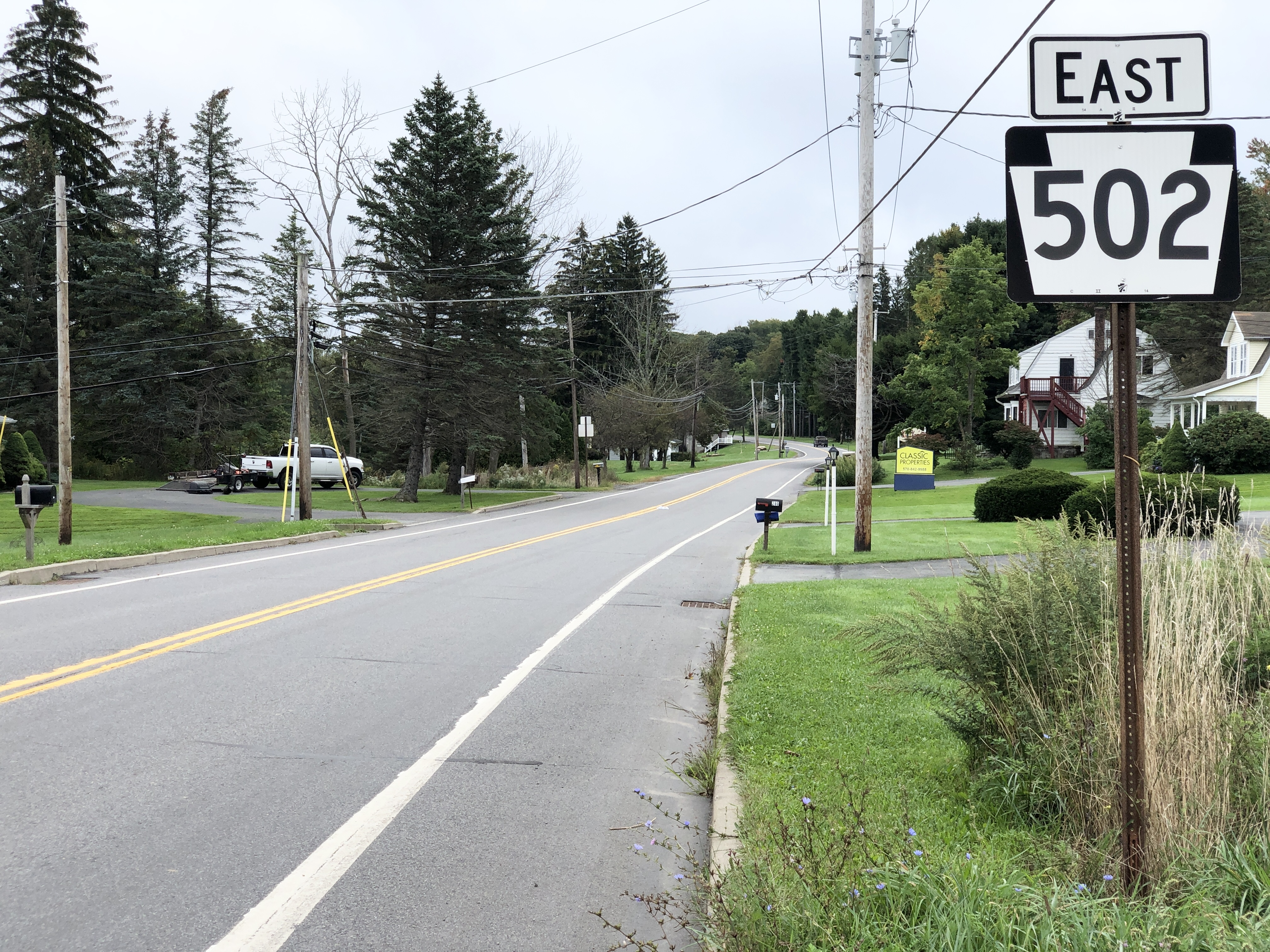
PA 502 eastbound at PA 307 in Covington Township

PA 502 begins at an intersection with US 11 in the borough of Moosic in Lackawanna County, heading east-southeast on two-lane undivided Springbrook Avenue. The road heads through residential and commercial areas, turning east and passing under I-81, where there is a ramp to the northbound direction of that highway. The route crosses Spring Brook and heads through residential areas, turning southeast again. PA 502 crosses the stream again before passing under I-476 (Pennsylvania Turnpike Northeast Extension) and a Luzerne and Susquehanna Railway line before heading into wooded areas with some homes and turning south. The road enters Pittston Township in Luzerne County and passes through Glendale, turning southeast and running past more homes before heading into forests and turning east again. The route heads into Spring Brook Township in Lackawanna County and becomes an unnamed road, winding east through more forests. PA 502 turns to the southeast and passes to the west of Nesbitt Reservoir before curving east into wooded areas with some homes. The road intersects the western terminus of PA 690 in Rockdale and heads through more woods with some fields and residences, passing through Spring Brook and Yostville. The route heads into Covington Township and becomes Daleville Highway, turning northeast and passing over I-380 before intersecting PA 307. PA 502 runs through wooded areas with homes before coming into a commercial area, gaining a center left-turn lane and ending at PA 435 in Daleville.

== History ==
When Pennsylvania first legislated routes in 1911, what is now PA 502 was not given a number. PA 502 was designated in 1928 to run from US 11 in Moosic east to US 611 (now PA 435) in Daleville along its current alignment. At this time, the entire length of the route was unpaved. The entire length of PA 502 was paved during the 1930s.

== Major intersections ==
County	Location	mi	km	Destinations	Notes
Lackawanna	Moosic	0.000	0.000	US 11 (Birney Avenue) to I-81 south	Western terminus
Lackawanna	Moosic	0.284	0.457	I-81 north – Scranton	Access to northbound I-81 only
Luzerne	No major junctions				
Lackawanna	Spring Brook Township	8.453	13.604	PA 690 east	Western terminus of PA 690
Lackawanna	Covington Township	12.700	20.439	PA 307 (Scranton-Pocono Highway) – Stroudsburg, Scranton	
Lackawanna	Covington Township	13.776	22.170	PA 435 (Drinker Turnpike)	Eastern terminus
1.000 mi = 1.609 km; 1.000 km = 0.621 mi: Incomplete access
