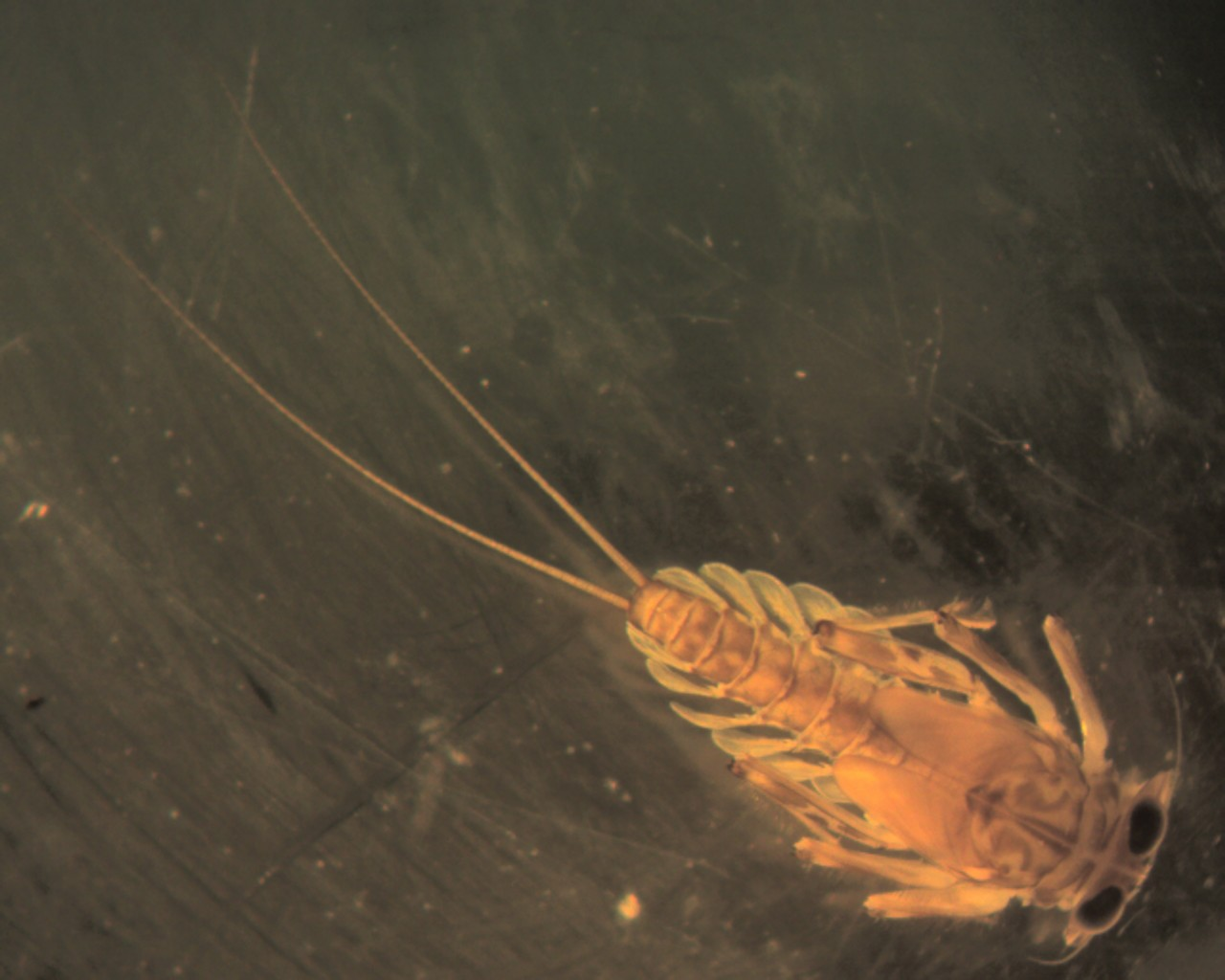

Scientific classification
- Domain: Eukaryota
- Kingdom: Animalia
- Phylum: Arthropoda
- Class: Insecta
- Order: Ephemeroptera
- Family: Heptageniidae
- Genus: Epeorus; Eaton, 1881

= Epeorus =

Genus of mayflies

Epeorus is a genus of mayflies in the family Heptageniidae.

== Species ==
- Epeorus aculeatus Braasch, 1990
- Epeorus aesculus Imanishi, 1934
- Epeorus albertae (McDunnough, 1924)
- Epeorus alexandri (Kluge & Tiunova, 1989)
- Epeorus alpestris (Braasch, 1979)
- Epeorus alpicola (Eaton, 1871)
- Epeorus assimilis (Eaton, 1865)
- Epeorus bifurcatus Braasch & Soldán, 1979
- Epeorus bispinosus Braasch, 1980
- Epeorus boonsoongi Braasch, 2011
- Epeorus borneonia (Ulmer, 1939)
- Epeorus carninatus Braasch & Soldán, 1984
- Epeorus caucasicus (Tshernova, 1938)
- Epeorus cumulus Imanishi, 1939
- Epeorus curvatulus Matsumura, 1931
- Epeorus deceptivus (McDunnough, 1924)
- Epeorus dispar (Traver, 1933)
- Epeorus dulciana (McDunnough, 1935)
- Epeorus ermolenkoi Tschernova, 1981
- Epeorus extraordinarius Chen, Wang & Zhou, 2010
- Epeorus fragilis (Morgan, 1911)
- Epeorus frisoni (Burks, 1946)
- Epeorus frolenkoi Sinitshenkova, 1981
- Epeorus gilliesi Braasch, 1981
- Epeorus gornostajevi Tshernova, 1981
- Epeorus grandis (McDunnough, 1924)
- Epeorus gultsha (Kustareva, 1984)
- Epeorus gurvitshi (Kustareva, 1984)
- Epeorus guttatus (Braasch and Soldán, 1979)
- Epeorus hesperus (Banks, 1924)
- Epeorus hiemalis Imanishi, 1934
- Epeorus hieroglyphicus Braasch & Soldán, 1984
- Epeorus ikanonis Takahashi, 1924
- Epeorus inaequalis (Braasch & Soldán, 1980)
- Epeorus insularis (Braasch, 1983)
- Epeorus inthanonensis Braasch & Boonsoong, 2010
- Epeorus jacobi (Braasch, 1978)
- Epeorus kapurkripalanorum (Braasch, 1983)
- Epeorus khayengensis Boonsoong & Braasch, 2010
- Epeorus kirgisicus (Kustareva, 1984)
- Epeorus l-nigrus Matsumura, 1931
- Epeorus lagunitas (Traver, 1935)
- Epeorus lahaulensis Kapur & Kripalani, 1963
- Epeorus latifolium (Uéno, 1928)
- Epeorus longimaculatus (Braasch, 1980)
- Epeorus longimanus Eaton, 1885
- Epeorus longitibius (Nguyen & Baye, 2004)
- Epeorus maculatus (Tschernova, 1949)
- Epeorus magnus (Braasch, 1978)
- Epeorus margarita Edmunds and Allen, 1964
- Epeorus martensi (Braasch, 1981)
- Epeorus martinus (Braasch & Soldán, 1984)
- Epeorus metlacensis Traver, 1964
- Epeorus montanus (Brodsky, 1930)
- Epeorus namatus (Burks, 1946)
- Epeorus napaeus Imanishi, 1934
- Epeorus ngi Gui, Zhou and Su, 1999
- Epeorus nguyenbaeorum Braasch & Boonsoong, 2010
- Epeorus nguyeni Webb & McCafferty, 2007
- Epeorus nigripilosus (Sinitshenkova, 1976)
- Epeorus ninae Kluge, 1995
- Epeorus nipponicus (Uéno, 1931)
- Epeorus packeri Allen & Cohen, 1977
- Epeorus pamirensis (Kustareva, 1984)
- Epeorus papillatus (Braasch, 2006)
- Epeorus paraguttatus (Braasch, 1983)
- Epeorus pellucidus (Brodsky, 1930)
- Epeorus permagnus (Traver, 1935)
- Epeorus pleuralis (Banks, 1910)
- Epeorus psi Eaton, 1885
- Epeorus punctatus (McDunnough, 1925)
- Epeorus rheophilus (Brodsky, 1930)
- Epeorus rhithralis Braasch, 1980
- Epeorus rubeus Tiunova, 1991
- Epeorus sagittatus Tong & Dudgeon, 2003
- Epeorus sinespinosus (Braasch, 1978)
- Epeorus sinitshenkovae (Braasch & Zimmermann, 1979)
- Epeorus siveci (Braasch, 1980)
- Epeorus soldani (Braasch, 1979)
- Epeorus subpallidus (Traver, 1937)
- Epeorus suffusus (McDunnough, 1925)
- Epeorus suspicatus (Braasch, 2006)
- Epeorus sylvicola (Pictet, 1865)
- Epeorus thailandensis Boonsoong & Braasch, 2013
- Epeorus tianshanicus (Kustareva, 1984)
- Epeorus tiberius Braasch & Soldán, 1984
- Epeorus torrentium Eaton, 1881
- Epeorus uenoi (Matsumura, 1933)
- Epeorus unicornutus Braasch, 2006
- Epeorus unispinosus Braasch, 1980
- Epeorus vitreus (Walker, 1853)
- Epeorus yougoslavicus (Samal, 1935)
- Epeorus zaitsevi Tshernova, 1981
- Epeorus znojkoi (Tshernova, 1938)
