= Nesbitt Reservoir =

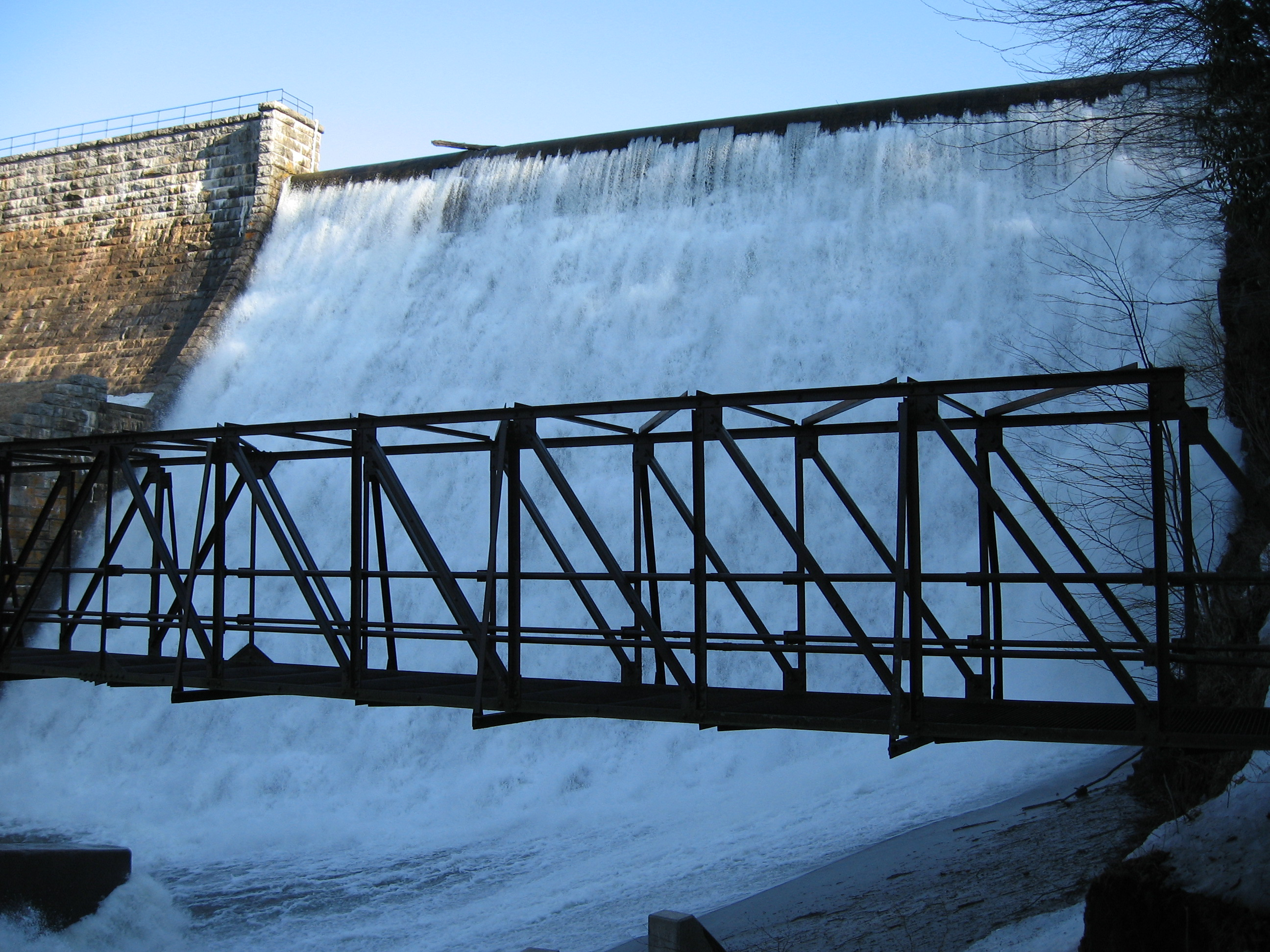
- Falls at Nesbitt Reservoir

- Location within Pennsylvania Location within the United States
- Location: Lackawanna County, Pennsylvania, United States
- Coordinates: 41°19′37″N 75°39′12″W
- Type: reservoir
- Basin countries: United States
- Surface elevation: 1,112 ft (339 m)

The Nesbitt Reservoir is located on Pennsylvania Route 502 in Spring Brook Township, Pennsylvania.

== History and notable features ==
This reservoir is managed and protected by the Pennsylvania American Water Company (PAWC). It provides a fresh water supply to approximately 75,000 area residents and is situated on Spring Brook, the second-largest tributary to the Lackawanna River.

Spring Brook begins near Yosteville, Pennsylvania and flows 17 miles (27 km) to its confluence with the Lackawanna River in Moosic, Pennsylvania. The Spring Brook watershed has nine named tributaries of its own, including subtributaries.

In 2012, Pennsylvania American Water completed improvements costing $27.4 million to the dam, which contains the 1.3 billion-gallon reservoir.

Whitewater rafting was previously done from the reservoir to Moosic. It was a medium difficult level for paddling for those not ready for the roaring rapids but not quite a beginner.

It is no longer accessible to the public since the reservoir was purchased from PAWC. Before that time, there was a nature trail that included sights of creeks, the stream, falls, deer and other small animals of nature.
