= Spring Brook Township, Pennsylvania =

Township in Pennsylvania, US

Spring Brook Township
- Township
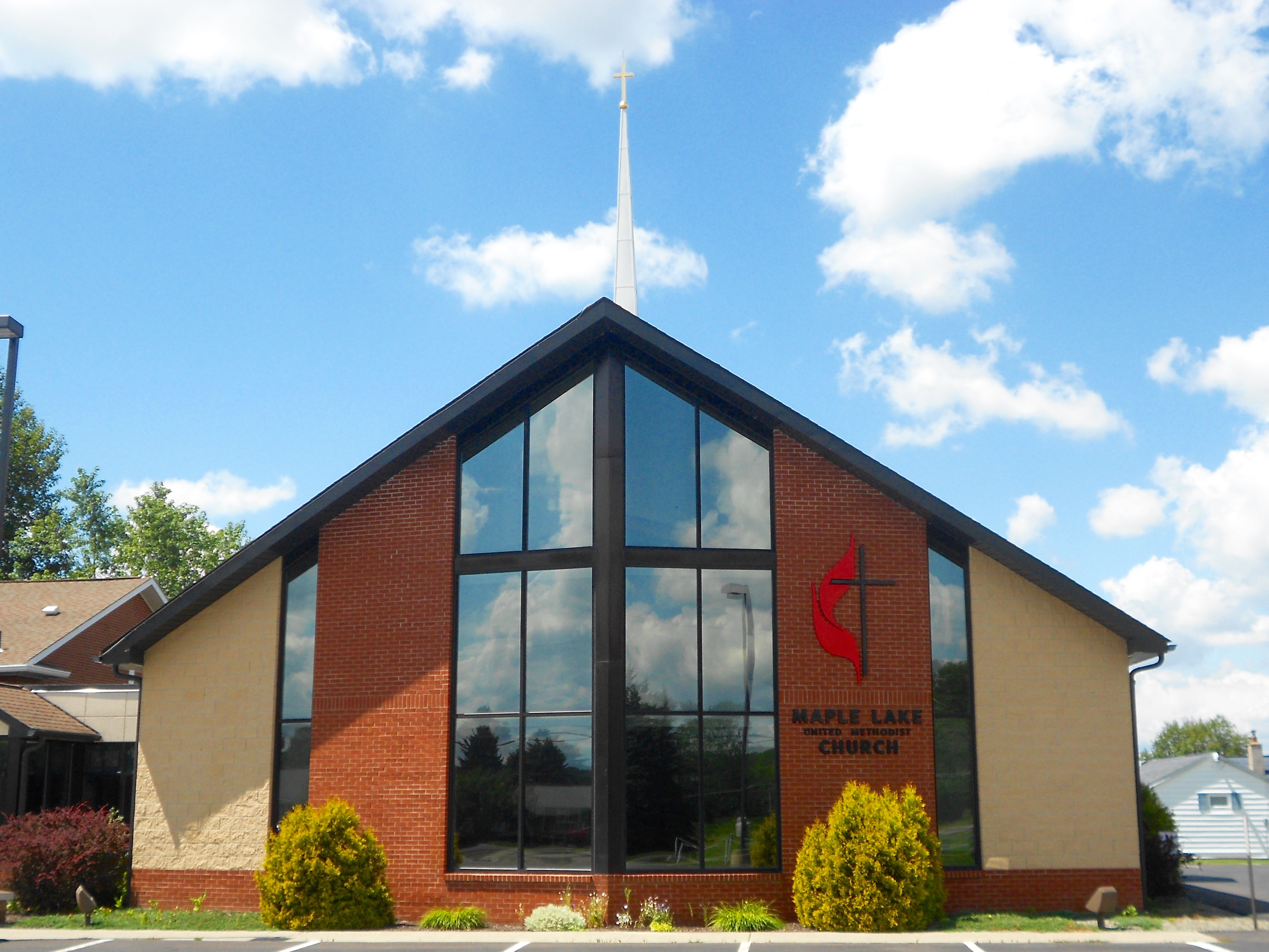
- Maple Lake United Methodist Church

- Location of Pennsylvania in the United States
- Coordinates: 41°18′00″N 75°34′59″W
- Country: United States
- State: Pennsylvania
- County: Lackawanna

Area
  - Total: 34.92 sq mi (90.44 km^{2})
  - Land: 34.32 sq mi (88.90 km^{2})
  - Water: 0.60 sq mi (1.55 km^{2})
- Elevation: 1,640 ft (500 m)

Population (2020)
  - Total: 2,753 ▼
  - Estimate (2021): 2,755
  - Density: 78.3/sq mi (30.23/km^{2})
- Time zone: UTC-5 (EST)
  - Summer (DST): UTC-4 (EDT)
- Postal code: 18444
- Area code: 570
- FIPS code: 42-069-72896

Spring Brook Township is a township in Lackawanna County, Pennsylvania, United States. The population was 2,753 at the 2020 census.

== Geography ==
According to the United States Census Bureau, the township has a total area of 34.7 square miles (89.8 km^{2}), of which 34.1 square miles (88.3 km^{2}) is land and 0.6 square miles (1.6 km^{2}) (1.73%) is water. The township contains the communities of Spring Brook, Tooley Corners, and Quinlan Corners, and is the location of Nesbitt Reservoir.

== Demographics ==
Historical population
Census	Pop.	Note	%±
2010	2,768		—
2020	2,753		−0.5%
2021 (est.)	2,755		0.1%
U.S. Decennial Census

=== 2000 census ===
At the 2000 census there were 2,367 people, 911 households, and 683 families living in the township. The population density was 69.4 inhabitants per square mile (26.8/km^{2}). There were 985 housing units at an average density of 28.9 per square mile (11.2/km^{2}). The racial makeup of the township was 98.73% White, 0.46% African American, 0.08% Native American, 0.21% Asian, 0.04% from other races, and 0.46% from two or more races. Hispanic or Latino of any race were 0.97%.

There were 911 households, 31.6% had children under the age of 18 living with them, 62.1% were married couples living together, 8.8% had a female householder with no husband present, and 25.0% were non-families. 22.9% of households were made up of individuals, and 10.5% were one person aged 65 or older. The average household size was 2.60 and the average family size was 3.04.

The age distribution was 24.0% under the age of 18, 6.3% from 18 to 24, 28.6% from 25 to 44, 26.3% from 45 to 64, and 14.8% 65 or older. The median age was 40 years. For every 100 females there were 97.3 males. For every 100 females age 18 and over, there were 96.6 males.

The median household income was $43,500 and the median family income was $50,811. Males had a median income of $37,632 versus $24,950 for females. The per capita income for the township was $19,622. About 5.1% of families and 6.5% of the population were below the poverty line, including 5.3% of those under age 18 and 8.7% of those age 65 or over.

=== 2010 census ===
At the 2010 census there were 2,768 people, 1,091 households, and 770 families living in the township. The population density was 81.2 people per square mile. There were 1,178 housing units at an average density of 34.5/sq mi. The racial makeup of the township was 97.4% White, 0.4% African American, 0.1% Native American, 0.7% Asian, 0.6% from other races, and 0.9% from two or more races. Hispanic or Latino of any race were 1.6%.

There were 1,091 households, 28.2% had children under the age of 18 living with them, 57.6% were married couples living together, 8.2% had a female householder with no husband present, and 29.4% were non-families. 24.7% of households were made up of individuals, and 9.5% were one person aged 65 or older. The average household size was 2.54 and the average family size was 3.03.

The age distribution was 22.0% under the age of 18, 62.8% from 18 to 64, and 15.2% 65 or older. The median age was 43.2 years.

The median household income was $74,821 and the median family income was $81,204. Males had a median income of $51,938 versus $32,458 for females. The per capita income for the township was $26,934. About 1% of families and 1.5% of the population were below the poverty line, including none of those under age 18 and 5.4% of those age 65 or over.

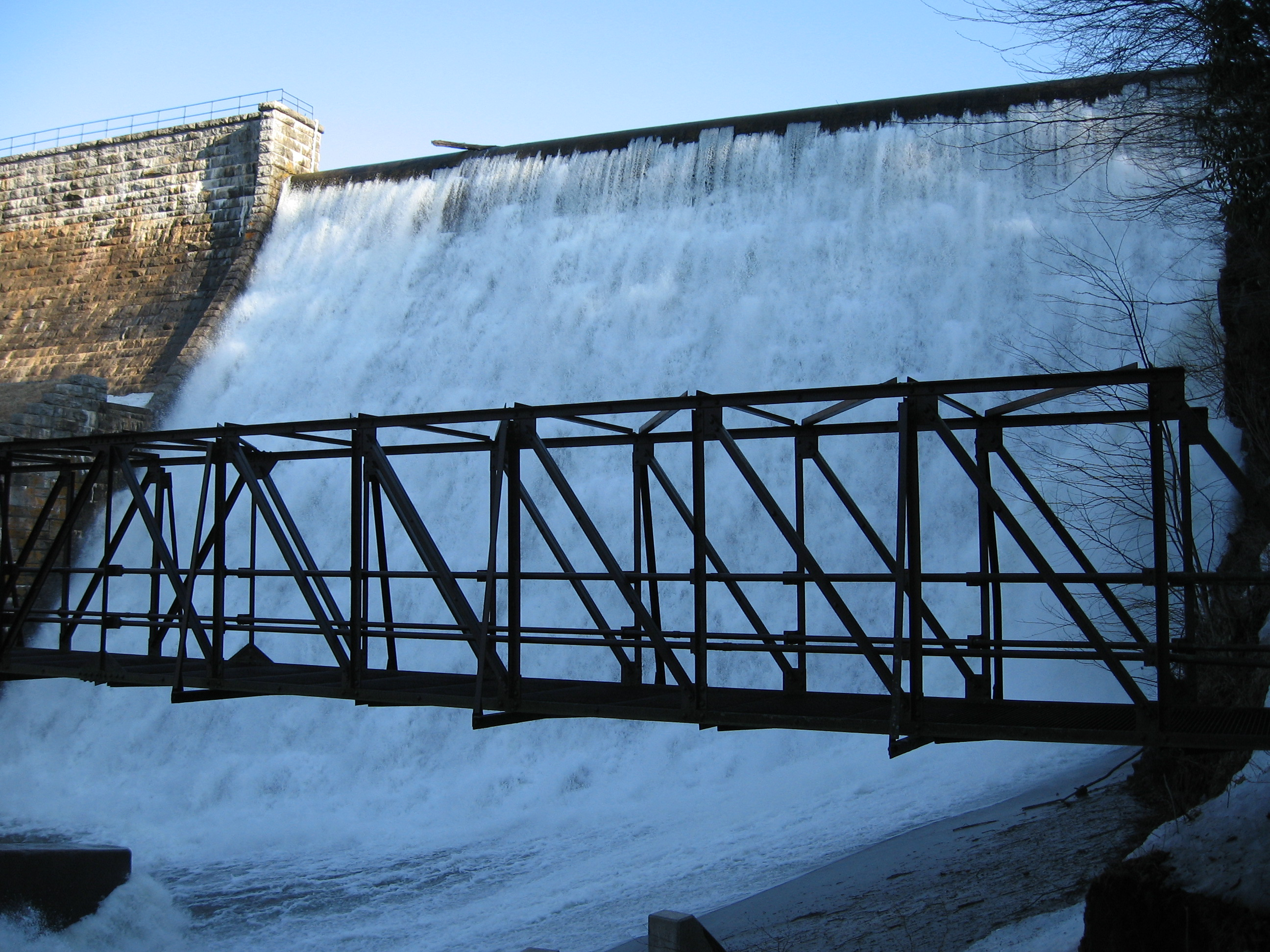
The Falls at Nesbitt Reservoir

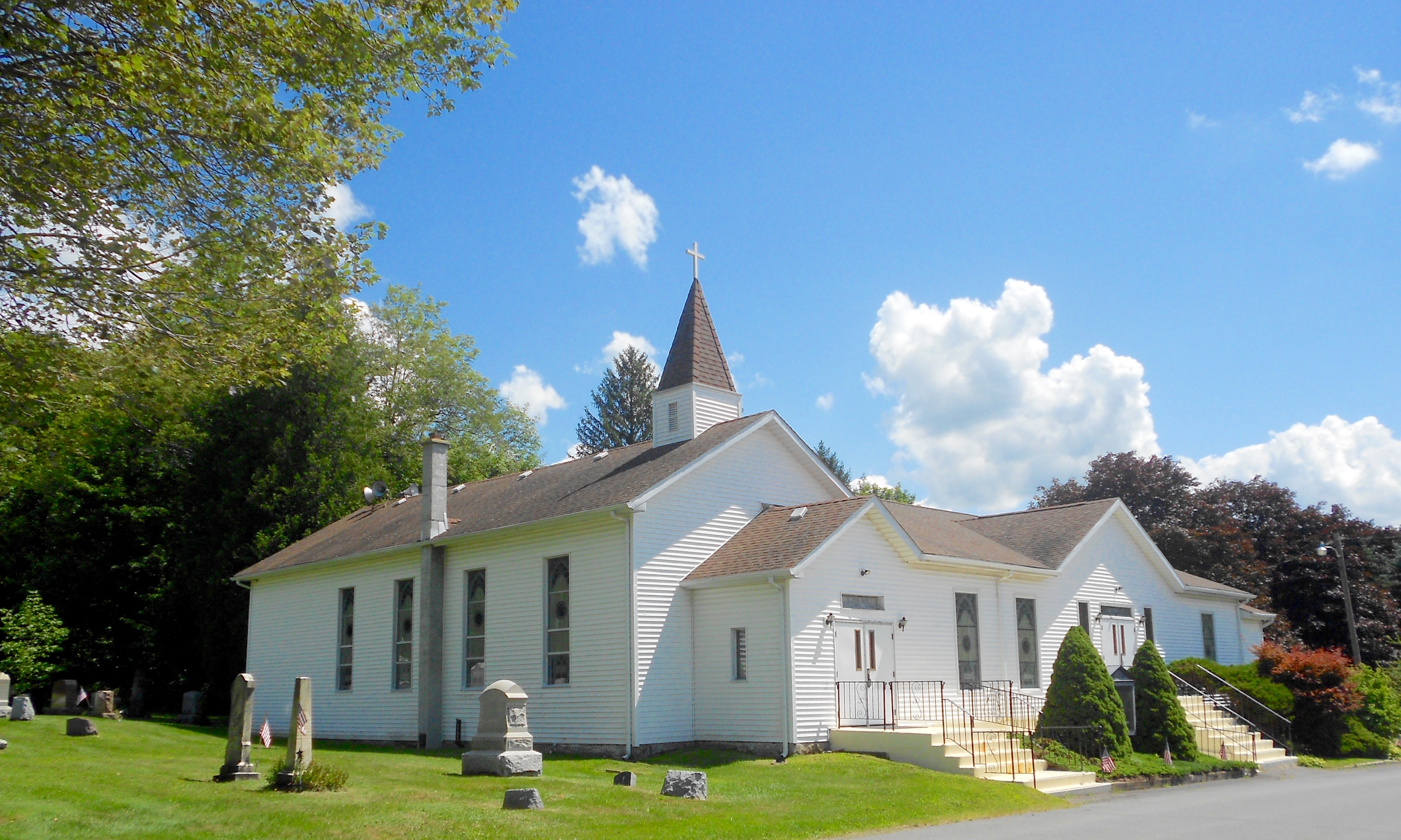
Spring Brook Congregational Church
