= Wallenpaupack =

Wallenpaupack may refer to the following in the U.S. state of Pennsylvania:

- Wallenpaupack Creek, a tributary of the Lackawaxen River
- Lake Wallenpaupack, an artificial reservoir on the border of Pike and Wayne counties
- Wallenpaupack Area School District, a school district
