= Wallenpaupack Lake Estates, Pennsylvania =

Unincorporated community in Pennsylvania, US

- Private community Census-designated place
- Wallenpaupack Lake Estates. President - Jerry Beskovoyne, Jr.
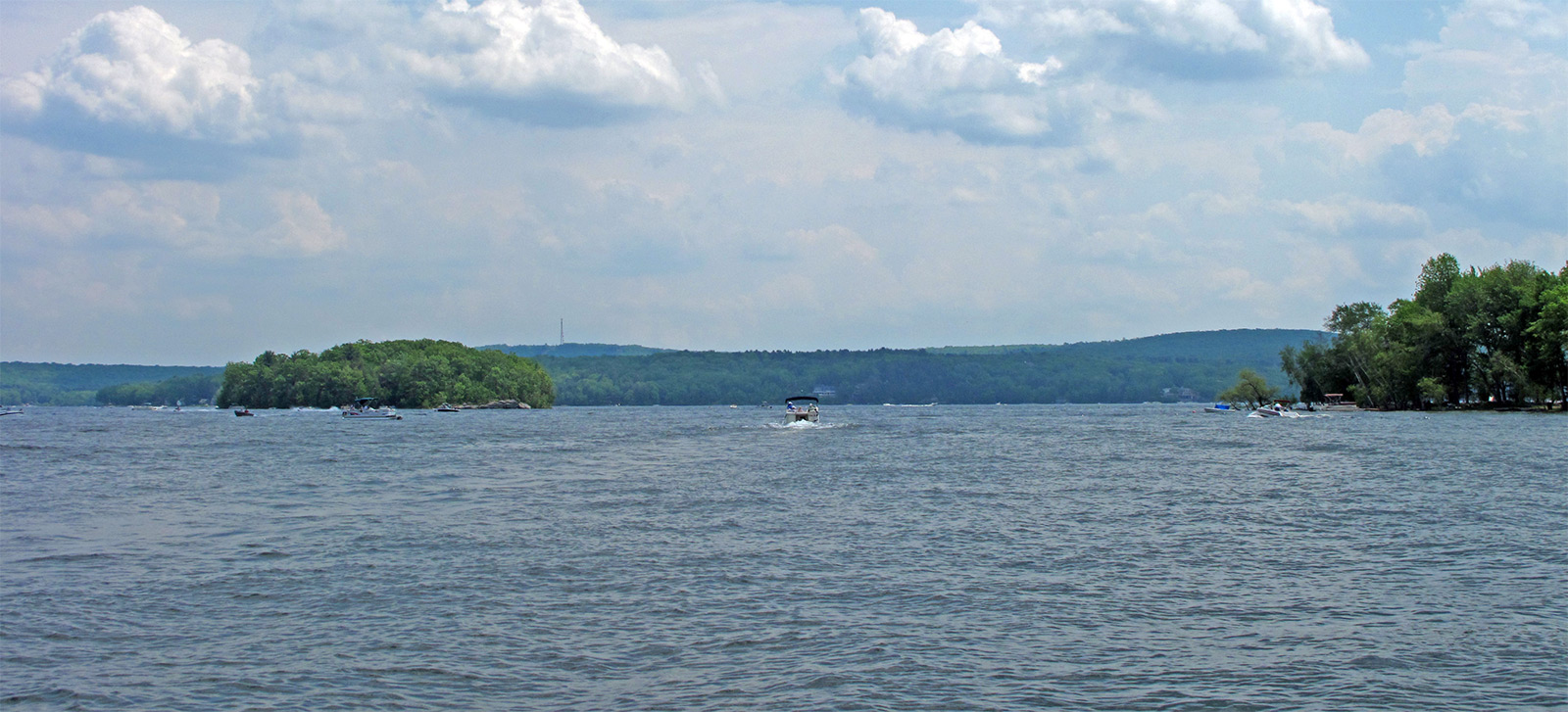
- Wallenpaupack Lake Estates is situated on the banks of Lake Wallenpaupack, the third largest lake in Pennsylvania.

- Location in Wayne County and the state of Pennsylvania.
- Country: United States
- State: Pennsylvania
- US Congressional District: PA-10
- School District: Wallenpaupack Area
- County: Wayne
- Magisterial District: 22-3-01
- Township: Paupack
- Named for: Lake Wallenpaupack

Area
  - Total: 2.0 sq mi (5.2 km^{2})
  - Land: 1.5 sq mi (4 km^{2})
  - Water: 0.39 sq mi (1 km^{2})
- Elevation: 1,371 ft (418 m)

Population (2010)
  - Total: 1,279
  - Density: 1,915/sq mi (739.3/km^{2})
- Time zone: UTC-5 (Eastern (EST))
  - Summer (DST): UTC-4 (Eastern Daylight (EDT))
- ZIP code: De facto 18436 (Lake Ariel)
- Area code: 570
- GNIS feature IDs: 2633445, 2633418
- FIPS code: 42-127-58480-80652
- Waterways: Beaver Lake, Deer Lake, Lake Wallenpaupack
- Website: Wallenpaupack Lake Estates

Wallenpaupack Lake Estates is a private community and census-designated place in Paupack Township, Wayne County in the U.S. State of Pennsylvania. The community's population was 1,279 as of the 2010 United States Census.

== Geography ==
According to the United States Census Bureau, the community has a total area of 2.02 square miles (5.2 km^{2}), 1.73 square miles (4.5 km^{2}) of which is land and 0.39 square miles (1.0 km^{2}) (19.31%) of which is water.

=== Demographics ===
As of the census of 2010, there were 1,279 people and 405 families residing in the community. The population density was 739.3 inhabitants per square mile (285.4/km^{2}). There were 1,415 housing units at an average density of 700.5 per square mile (270.5/km^{2}). The racial makeup of the community was 96.0% White, 2.3% Black or African American, 0.2% American Indian or Alaska Native, 0.3% Asian. 0.4% of the community's inhabitants classified themselves as being from other races, and 0.8% identified as two or more races. Hispanics and Latinos of any race made up 3.6% of the population.

There were 537 households, 58.2% of which were heterosexual married couples living together (Pennsylvania did not start performing same-sex marriages until May 20, 2014), and 23.8% of which had children under the age of 18 living with them. 3.4% had a male householder with no wife present, while 11.5% had a female householder with no husband present, and 24.6% of households were non-families. 20.3% of all households were made up of individuals, 9.8% of which consisted of an individual 65 years of age or older. The average household size was 2.38 and the average family size was 2.70.

The community's population was relatively age-diverse, with 18.5% of residents under the age of 18, 54.8% aged 18 to 64, and 26.7% aged 65 years of age or older. The median age was 51.1 years.

The median income for a household in the community was $53,046, and the median income for a family was $64,719. The median income for male full-time, year-round workers was $49,087, while similar females had a median income of $38,635. The per capita income for the community was $28,155. About 11.3% of families and 15.4% of the population were below the poverty threshold, including 21.6% of those under age 18 and 9.4% of those ages 65 or over.

== Education ==
It is in the Wallenpaupack Area School District.
