= Greentown, Pennsylvania =

Unincorporated community in Pennsylvania, US

- Village
- First Assembly of God Church in Greentown

- Greentown's location within Pennsylvania. Greentown (the United States)
- Coordinates: 41.3218°N 75.3055°W
- Country: United States
- State: Pennsylvania
- U.S. Congressional District: PA-8
- School District: Wallenpaupack Area
- County: Pike
- Magisterial District: Greene
- Elevation: 1,668 ft (508 m)
- ZIP code: 18426
- Area codes: 570 and 272

Greentown is a village in Greene Township, Pike County, Pennsylvania, United States. It had a population of 4,526 in the 2000 US Census.

Greentown is home to the Ledgedale Recreational Area and parts of Lake Wallenpaupack. It is served by the Wallenpaupack Area School District.

== Housing ==
Housing in the village is mostly restricted to communities, including: The Escape, Lake Paupack Club, Tanglwood Lakes, Paupack Hills, White Pines, Tranquility Falls, Sand Spring Acres, and Lake Wallenpaupack Estates (not to be confused with Wallenpaupack Lake Estates in Wayne County, Pennsylvania).

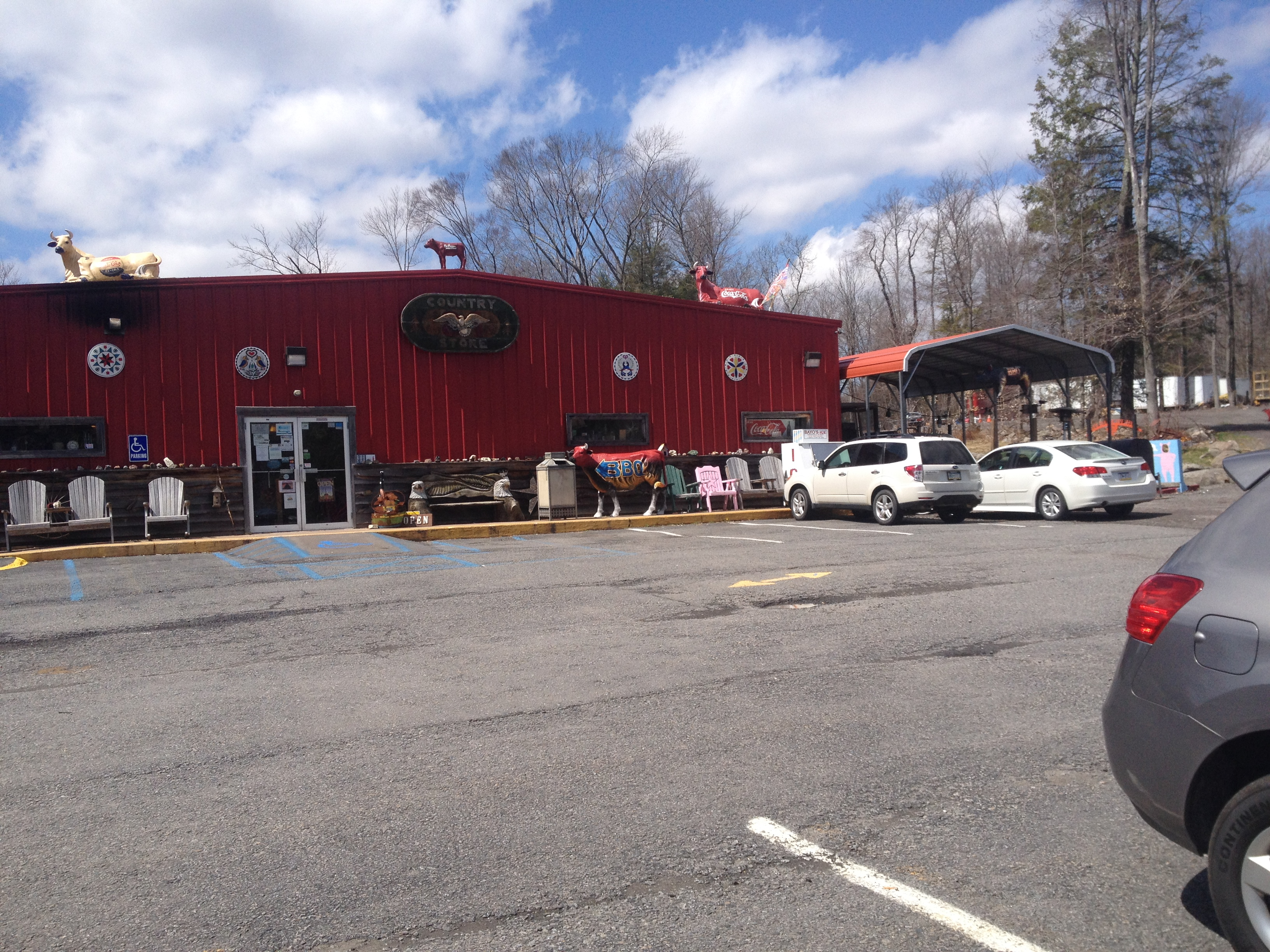
84 Country Store

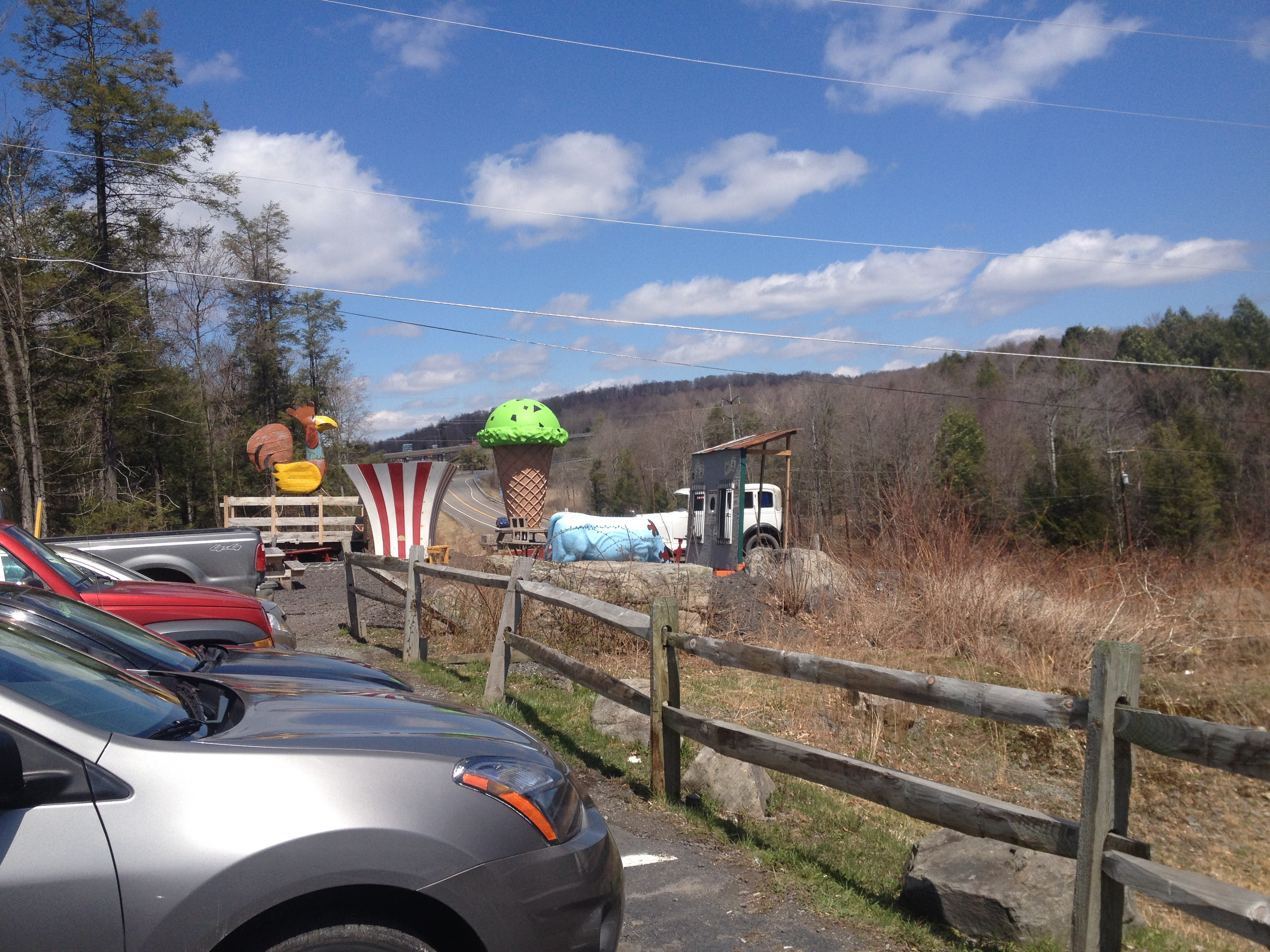
View toward Interstate 84

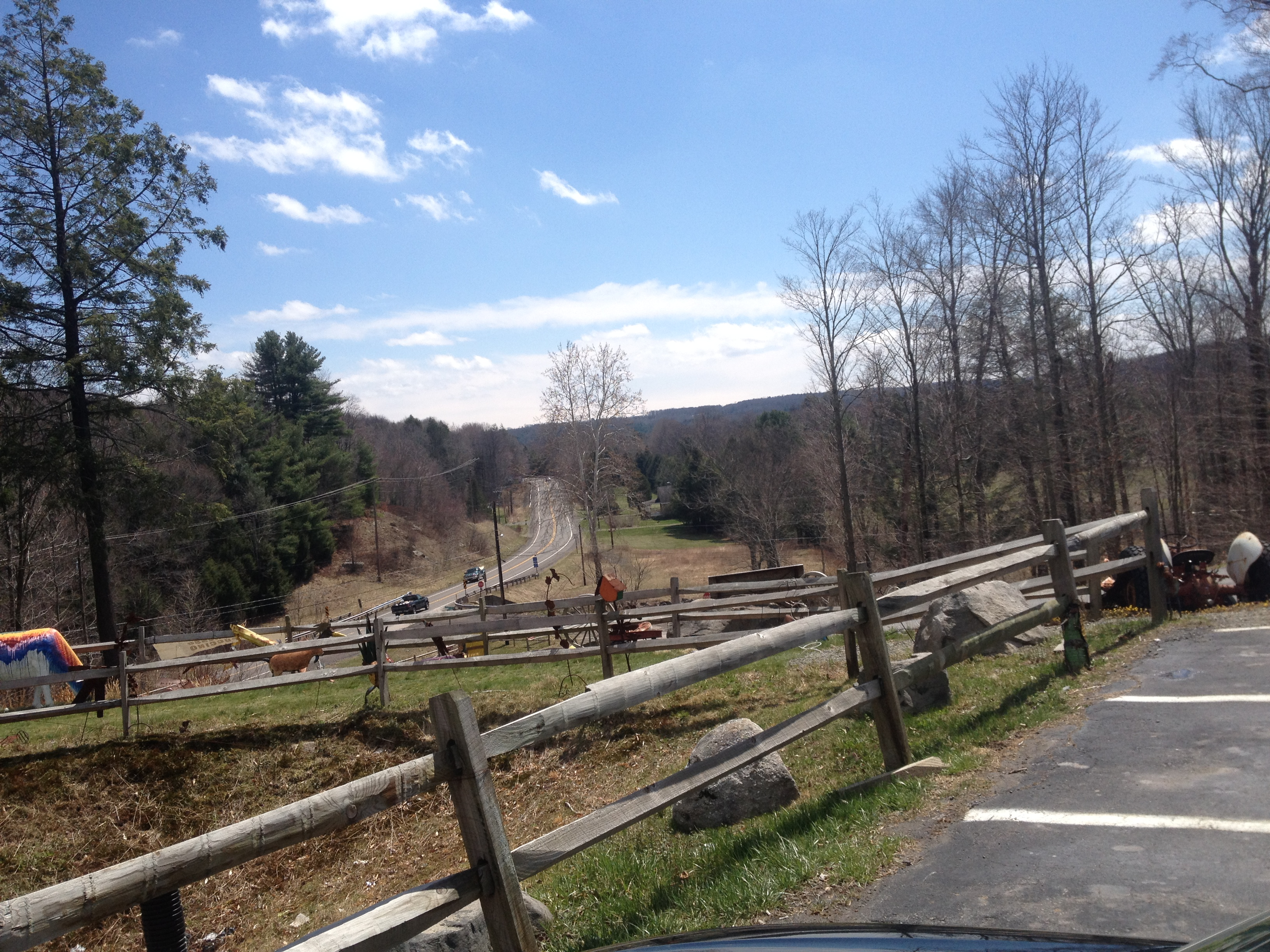
View away from Interstate 84
