= Lakeville, Pennsylvania =

Unincorporated community in Pennsylvania, US

- Village
- Village of Lakeville
- Lakeville Volunteer Fire Company

- Lakeville's location within Pennsylvania. Lakeville (the United States)
- Coordinates: 41°26′17.6″N 75°16′35.77″W
- Country: United States
- State: Pennsylvania
- U.S. Congressional District: 8
- County: Wayne
- School District: Wallenpaupack
- Magisterial District: 22-3-01
- Township: Paupack
- Elevation: 1,260 ft (384 m)

Population (2000)
  - Total: 945
- Time zone: UTC-5 (Eastern (EST))
  - Summer (DST): UTC-4 (Eastern Daylight (EDT))
- ZIP code: 18438
- Area codes: 570 and 272
- GNIS feature ID: 1181094
- Major Roads: PA Route 590

Lakeville is a village in Paupack Township, Wayne County, Pennsylvania, United States. It is located along the western shores of Lake Wallenpaupack and can be accessed by Pennsylvania Route 590, about eight miles (13 km) east of Hamlin, and approximately seven miles (11 km) west of Hawley, both on Route 590. The city of Scranton is located about 17 miles (27 km) west.

== Postal service ==
Lakeville formerly had its own post office, but is now served by the Hawley Post Office, as is the rest of Paupack Township.
