= Lacawac =

- U.S. National Register of Historic Places
- U.S. National Natural Landmark
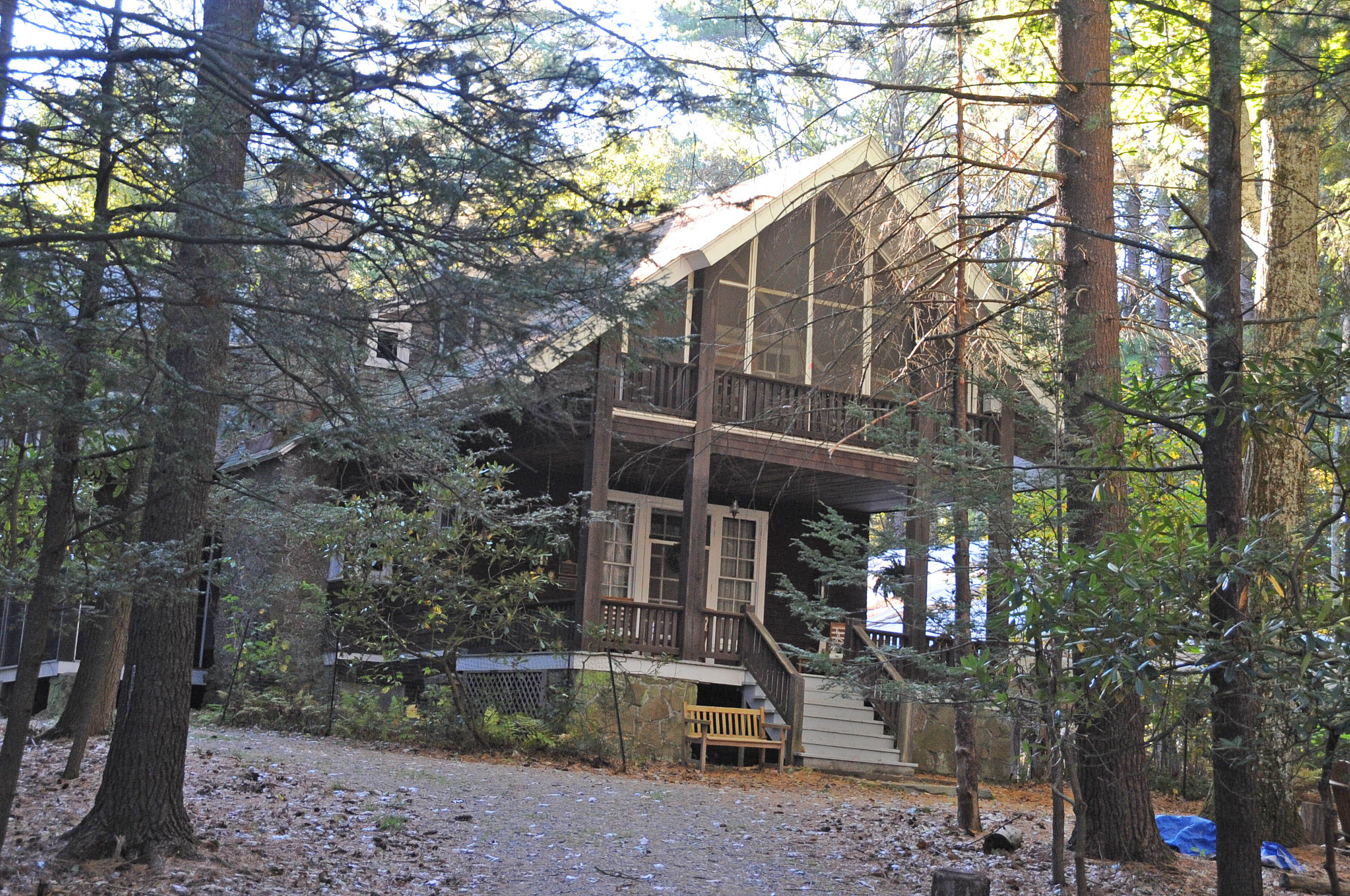

- Location within Pennsylvania Location within the United States
- Location: Lake Ariel, Pennsylvania, United States
- Coordinates: 41°22′43″N 75°17′40″W
- Area: 461.6 acres (186.8 ha)
- Built: 1903
- Built by: Kriegers, Stermers & Martin
- Architectural style: Rustic
- NRHP reference No.: 79002367
- Added to NRHP: August 9, 1979

Lacawac is a historic estate located in Paupack Township and Salem Township, Wayne County, Pennsylvania, United States.

It was listed on the National Register of Historic Places in 1979.

== History and architectural features ==
Built in 1903 as a summer estate for Congressman William Connell (1827–1909), the buildings of this historic property were designed in the Adirondack Great Camp style. Six of the eight original structures remain, including the main house, a barn, a spring house, a pump house, the Coachman's Cabin, and an ice house.

The main house is a 2 1/2-story frame dwelling with a cross gable roof. It features two-story porches and an interior paneled in southern yellow pine.

After Connell's death in 1909, the estate was purchased by Louis Arthur Watres for use as a summer home.

In 1966, the property was deeded to a non-profit organization and subsequently used as a nature preserve, ecological field research station and public environmental education facility.

It was listed on the National Register of Historic Places in 1979. Lake Lacawac was listed as a National Natural Landmark in 1968.
