= Palmyra Township, Pennsylvania =

Palmyra Township is the name of some places in the U.S. state of Pennsylvania:

- Palmyra Township, Pike County, Pennsylvania
- Palmyra Township, Wayne County, Pennsylvania
