= Lake Lacawac =

Lake in Pennsylvania, United States

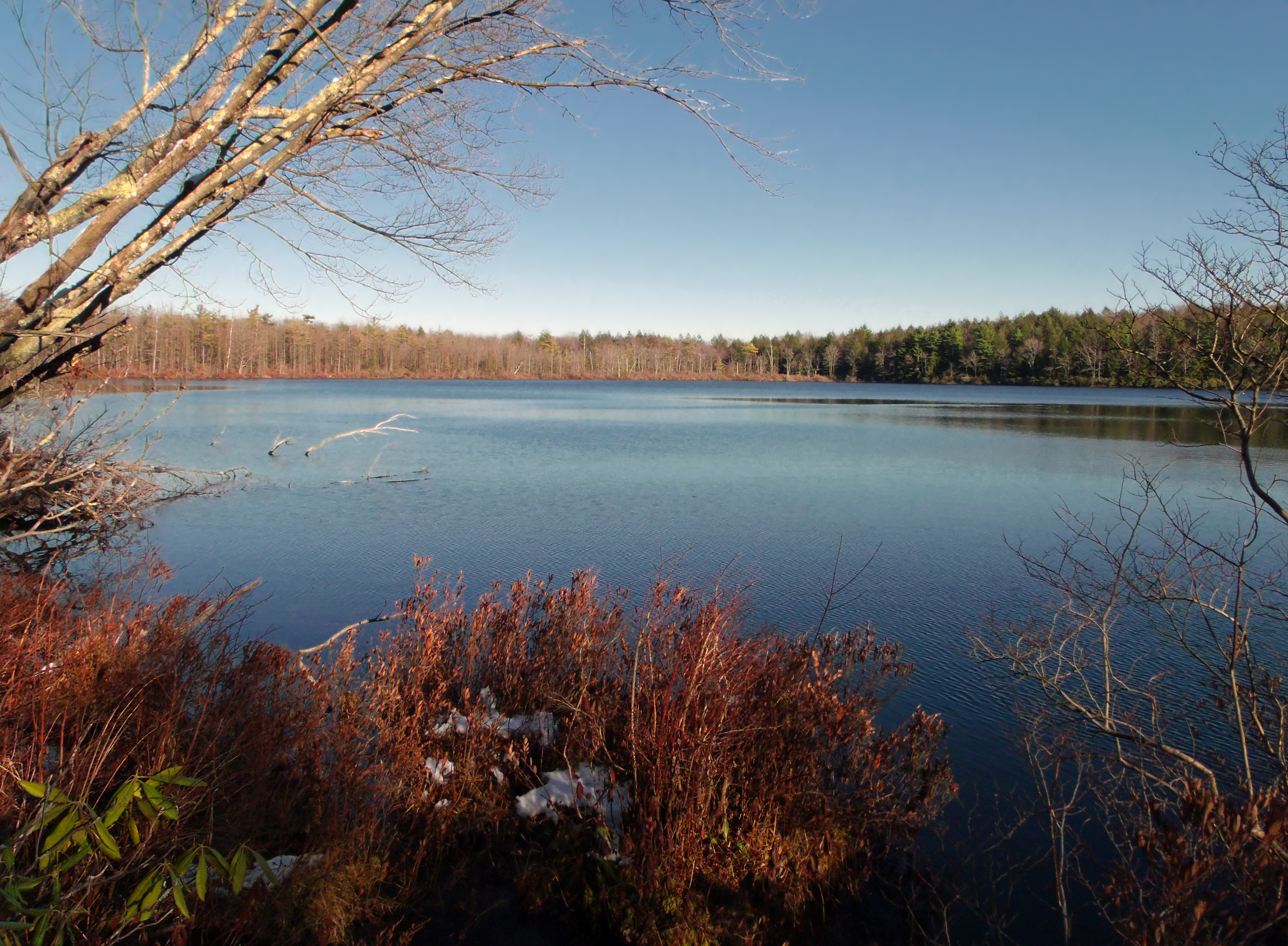

- Location within Pennsylvania Location within the United States
- Interactive map of Lake Lacawac
- Location: Lakeville, Pennsylvania
- Coordinates: 41°22′56″N 75°17′33″W
- Type: Glacial lake
- Basin countries: United States
- Designation: Nature reserve National Natural Landmark
- Surface area: 52 acres (21 ha)
- Max. depth: 43 ft (13 m)
- Surface elevation: 1,440 ft (440 m)
- References: GNIS

Lake Lacawac is located at the very middle of Lacawac's Sanctuary Field Station in Lakeville, Pennsylvania and has been deemed the "southernmost unpolluted glacial lake in North America." Lake Lacawac has proven to be invaluable to researchers and students to conduct field experiments in order to learn more about the limnology of the lake.

This lake is one of the last few lakes that does not have an excessive amount of watershed disturbance or residential disturbance. This makes it a good candidate for research because there is minimal human disturbance and there are not a lot of natural disturbances that change its different characteristics. It was designated a National Natural Landmark in 1968.

== Species ==
One of the main organisms that have been studied at Lake Lacawac are beaver. Researchers and other people who monitor and study the lake have noticed that the water levels are rising, so the dams being created by these beavers need to be destroyed.

Some of the aquatic species found in this lake are small and largemouth bass and chain pickerel, which were identified as the main predator species. Other fish species include bluegill, pumpkinseeds, yellow perch, and golden shiners.

Most of the phytoplankton community is dominated by crysophycean algae.

== Geography ==
This lake is located in Northeastern Pennsylvania near the shore of Lake Wallenpaupack. With its location being in the middle of a heavily forested area, it is able to be preserved easier because this area of Northeastern Pennsylvania is mainly undisturbed in terms of human interference.

== Formation ==
Lake Lacawac is a glacial lake that was formed more than 13,000 years ago (at the end of the last ice age). More specifically, it is known as a scour lake because when the Wisconsin glacier passed through the area, it formed a crater in the sandstone. As the climate increased in warmth, the ice melted and resulted in Lake Lacawac.

When Lake Lacawac was first formed it was 156 acres (63 ha) in size, but is now about 52 acres (21 ha) in size. This is likely due to the increasing temperatures that have been linked to climate change over the late 20th century. The shape of this lake has been compared to a half moon shape, and two different types of habitats can be observed within the lake. One of the habitats that is located on the eastern and southern shores is sandy and barren due to the continuous waves that break down the sandstone and washes away the plant matter in that area. The other habitat can be seen on the north and west shores and has been described as a bog area or wetland because of the many trees that have fallen over the years and the plant material that has been deteriorating.

== Limnology ==
=== Thermal stratification ===
Since Lake Lacawac is moderately deep, around 43 ft (13 m) deep, it is able to thermally stratify and is classified as a mesotrophic lake. Thermal stratification happens when each layer of a lake (epilimnion, metalimnion, and hypolimnion) is distinct enough to have different temperatures and the difference in those temperatures causes the bottom layer of the lake to be cold while the top layer is warm.

Lake Lacawac is also a dimictic lake which means that it mixes twice a year, once in the fall and once in the spring. Mixing is important in order to spread various nutrients throughout the lake, as well as disperse the amount of dissolved oxygen in the lake in order to sustain the organisms within the lake.

Lake Lacawac is also classified as a seepage lake. This feature of Lacawac represents the fact that it receives most of its water from precipitation and groundwater rather than from a different water source like a stream or river.

Since this lake demonstrates seasonal patterns of thermal stratification, it is typically ice covered from December until March.

=== Ecological research: Study on long-term browning of Lake Lacawac ===
This study was done utilizing water samples from a single depth in the epilimnion of Lake Lacawac and Lake Giles during the peak of maximum thermal stratification during a study period of twenty-six years (1988-2014). In order to measure the strength of stratification, the average temperature of the epilimnion was subtracted from the average temperature of the hypolimnion. The strength of stratification was important to measure in order to determine how much turbidity there was in the water as a result of long-term browning. The results of this observational study showed that there was a statistically significant decline in water transparency in Lake Lacawac over the twenty-six years of data that they collected, meaning that the influx of terrestrially-derived dissolved organic matter has been affecting the water quality, which has in turn been affecting food webs and habitats in the lake. Compare to Lake Giles, Lake Lacawac had a higher amount of dissolved organic matter in it when these researchers started the study. This explains the stronger long-term trends in Giles compared to Lacawac because it was discovered that less transparent lakes are more susceptible to browning.

Further research on Lake Lacawac showed that with exposure to long-term browning, there was only a significant decrease in hypolimnetic temperature and there were no trends that were found for surface temperature, dissolved oxygen, or pH, like they found in Lake Giles.

=== Mineral magnetic study of Pennsylvania lakes ===
This study, completed in 1997, evaluated the mineral magnetic and scaled chrysophyte features of sediment across various lakes in Pennsylvania. Looking at the sediment specifically in Lake Lacawac, the researchers found that the distinct layers of sediment in the lake increased in magnetization in the top 10 cm (4 in) of the pile of sediment. The increase in magnetization closer to the surface can be explained by two different scenarios; atmospheric deposition of magnetic fly ash from power stations and various land use changes that Lake Lacawac has experienced.
