= Wilsonville, Pennsylvania =

- Unincorporated community
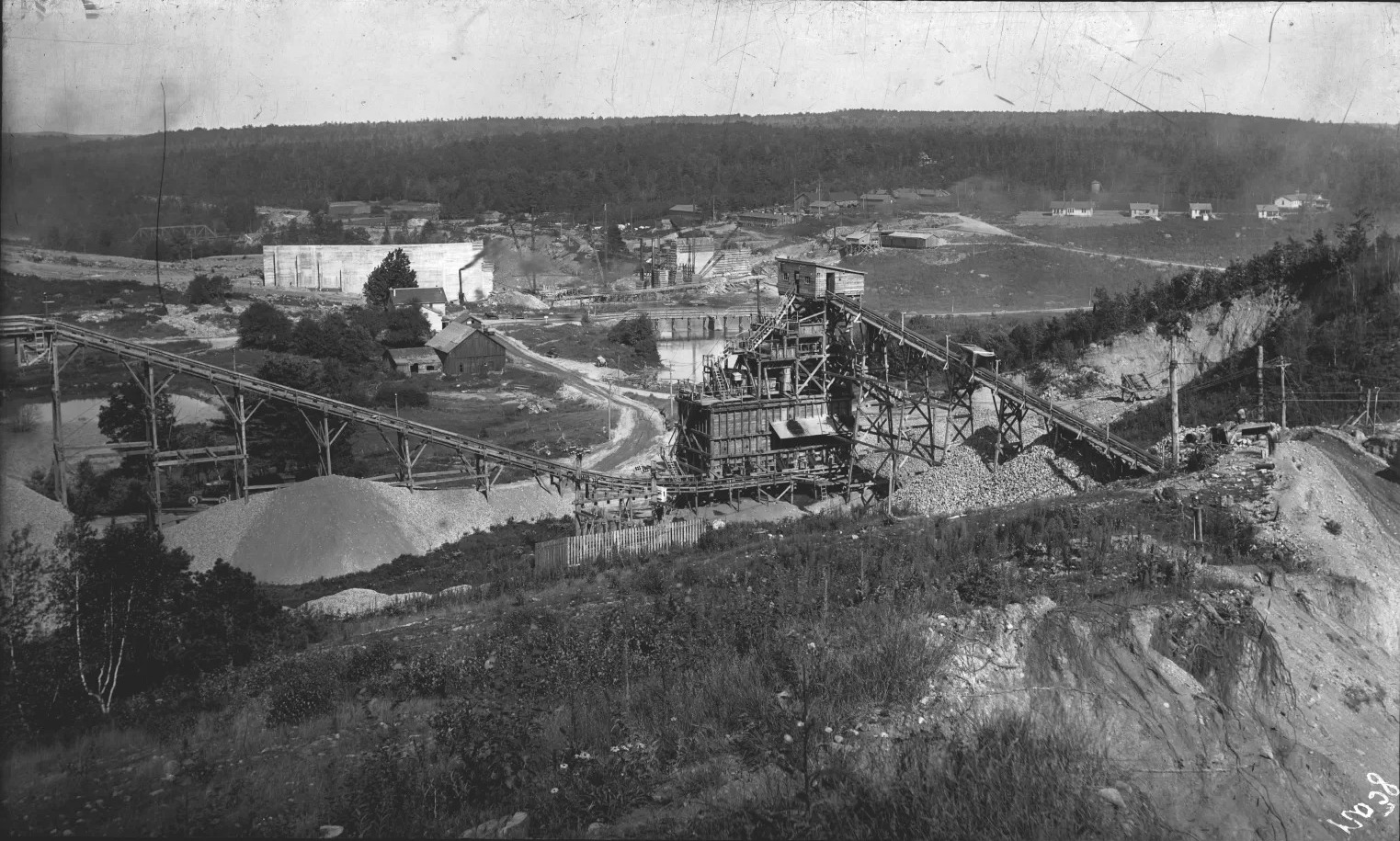
- Wilsonville in 1924, as construction on the dam begins

- Location within Pennsylvania Location within the United States
- Coordinates: 41°27′07″N 75°10′45″W
- Country: United States
- State: Pennsylvania
- County: Pike
- Time zone: UTC-5 (Eastern (EST))
  - Summer (DST): UTC-4 (EDT)

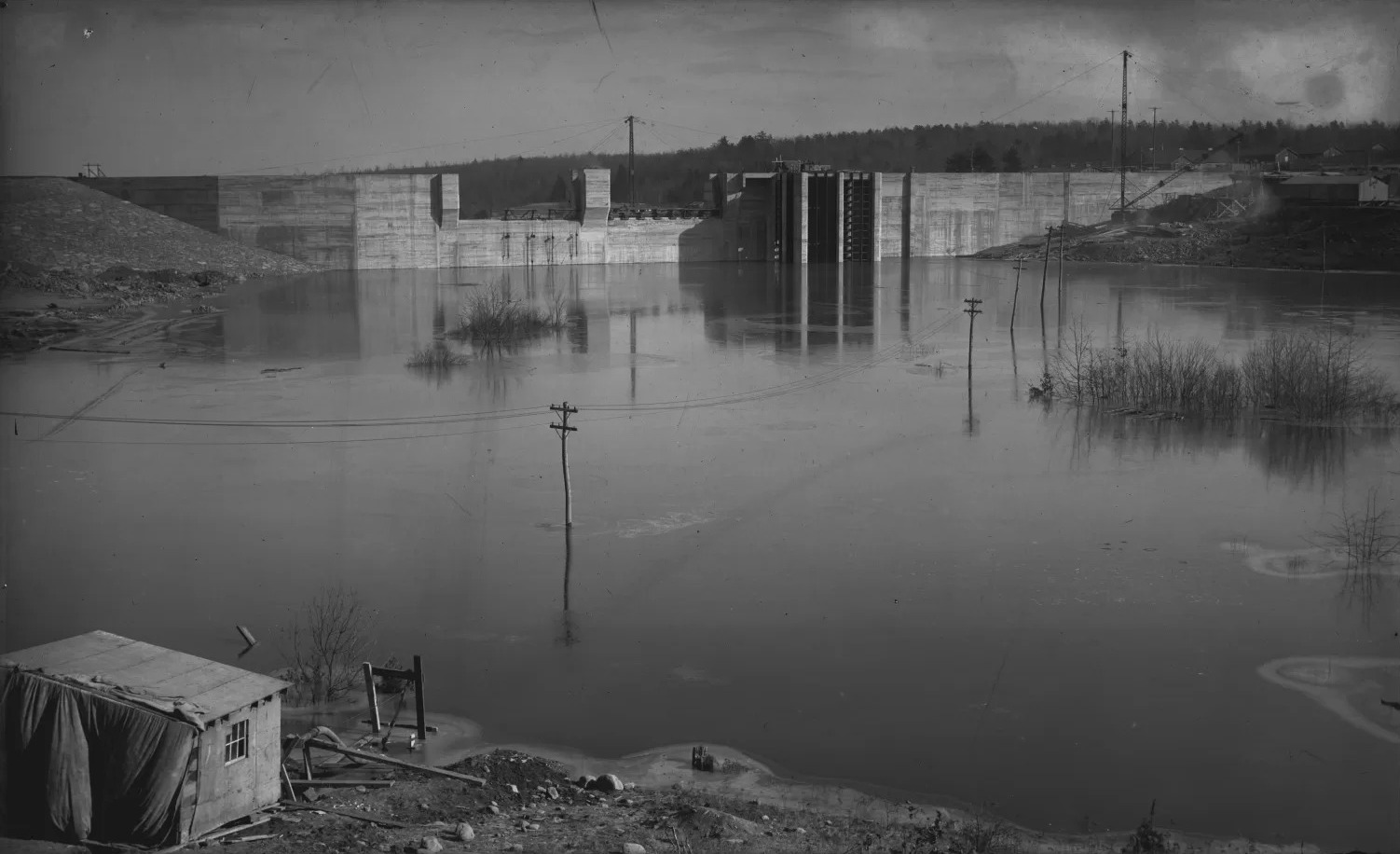
Wilsonville in 1925, during the construction of the dam

Wilsonville was an unincorporated community located in Pike County, Pennsylvania. The community was razed in 1924 for the construction of Lake Wallenpaupack.

== History ==
Wilsonville was established in the late 18th century and was originally called Factoryville. James Wilson, an associate justice of the United States Supreme Court, purchased the land surrounding Factoryville in 1793 from the estate of Thomas Penn and established a hemp and flax mill at Wallenpaupack Creek Falls, near the town. Factoryville subsequently changed its name to Wilsonville in Wilson's honor.

Wilsonville grew to such a size that it was chosen as the county seat of Wayne County from 1799 to 1802. Wilson's land was sold in 1804 and the mill subsequently closed, which led to the decline of the town. In 1814, Wilsonville became part of Pike County, which was founded on land split off from Wayne County. Most businesses in the town had closed by 1822, with the exception of a tavern operated by a resident. In 1829, a gravity railroad was constructed through Wilsonville to transport coal. Increased lumber harvesting in the area also brought renewed business to the town.

In 1907, the Pennsylvania, New York and New Jersey Power Company began surveying the area for the construction of a hydroelectric dam. The residents of Wilsonville agreed to sell their properties to the company, and in 1924, the town was demolished. In 1925, the area was flooded with up to 60 feet of water, which became Lake Wallenpaupack, and in 1926 the dam was completed. The remains of the town lie submerged beneath the northern end of the lake.
