= Wallenpaupack Creek =

River in Pennsylvania, United States

Coordinates: 41.244349°N 75.350542°W

Wallenpaupack Creek is a 30.0-mile-long (48.3 km) tributary of the Lackawaxen River in the Pocono Mountains of eastern Pennsylvania in the United States.

Wallenpaupack is from the Unami language and has been interpreted as "deep, dead water" or "the stream of swift and slow water."

Approximately 13 miles (21 km) of the lower Wallenpaupack Creek lies buried beneath Lake Wallenpaupack, a reservoir created when the utility PPL Corporation (PP&L) dammed the creek in 1926 as a water supply for a 44-megawatt hydroelectric power plant. The dividing line between the lake and the creek is the Ledgedale Road bridge. See map.

== East Branch Wallenpaupack Creek ==
The 5.2-mile-long (8.4 km) East Branch joins the main branch at the community of Greentown in Pike County.

The 4.2-mile-long (6.8 km) tributary Bridge Creek joins the East Branch approximately 1.3 miles (2.1 km) before the latter joins the main branch.

== West Branch Wallenpaupack Creek ==
The 15.0-mile-long (24.1 km) West Branch joins the main branch several miles downstream of the East Branch, approximately midway between Interstate 84 and Ledgedale Road SR4001.

== See also ==
- List of rivers of Pennsylvania
