= Palmyra Township, Wayne County, Pennsylvania =

Township in Pennsylvania, US

Palmyra Township
- Township
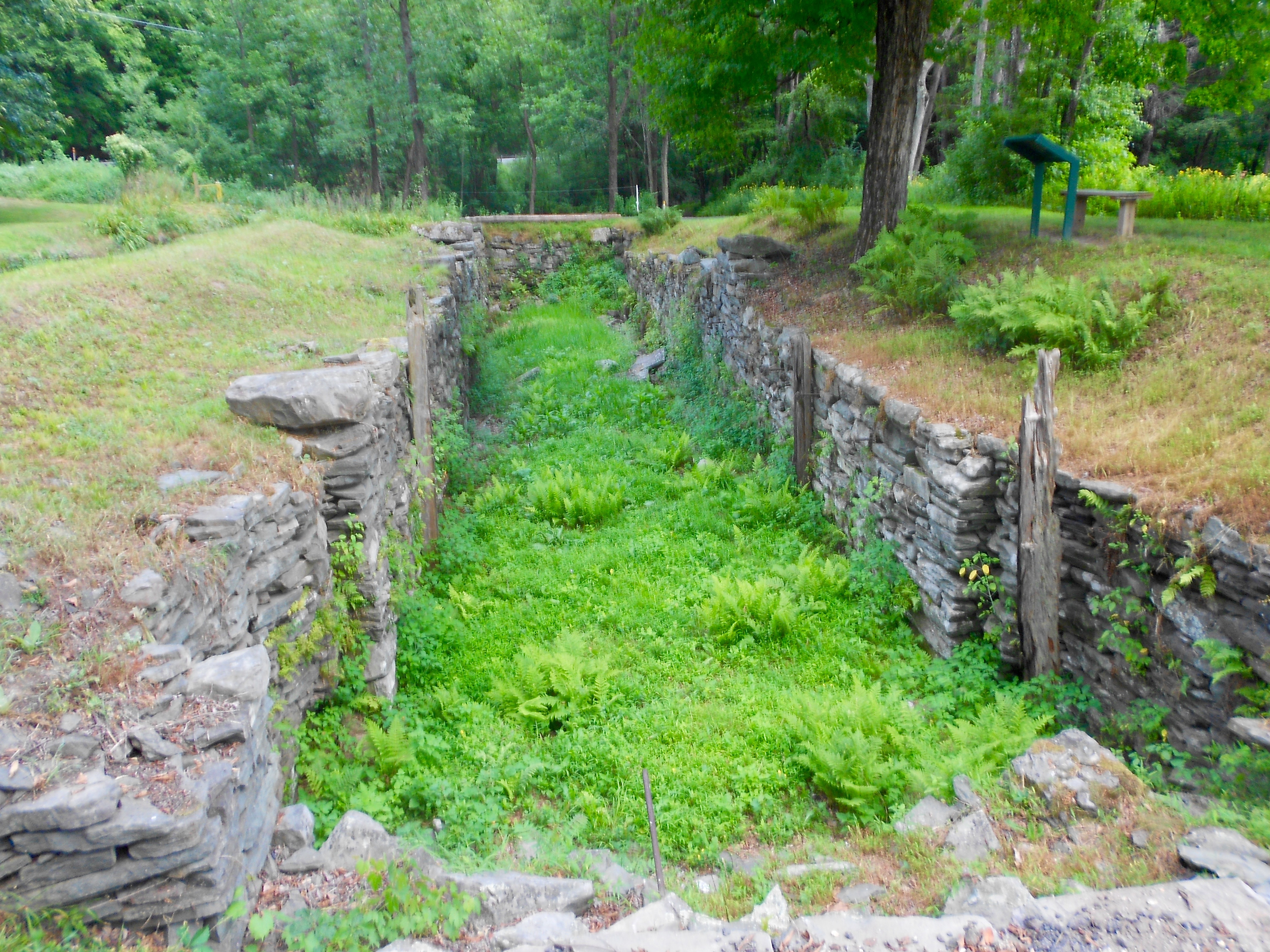
- Delaware & Hudson Canal Lock 31

- Location in Wayne County and the state of Pennsylvania.

- Location of Pennsylvania in the United States
- Coordinates: 41°29′00″N 75°10′59″W
- Country: United States
- State: Pennsylvania
- County: Wayne

Area
  - Total: 16.34 sq mi (42.32 km^{2})
  - Land: 15.90 sq mi (41.18 km^{2})
  - Water: 0.44 sq mi (1.15 km^{2})
- Elevation: 942 ft (287 m)

Population (2010)
  - Total: 1,339
  - Estimate (2016): 1,289
  - Density: 81/sq mi (31.3/km^{2})
- Time zone: UTC-5 (EST)
  - Summer (DST): UTC-4 (EDT)
- Zip Code: 18428
- Area code: 570
- FIPS code: 42-127-57736
- Website: Palmyra Township

Palmyra is a second-class township in Wayne County, Pennsylvania. The township's population was 1,339 at the time of the 2010 United States Census.

== History ==
Palmyra Township was much larger when first formed. When Pike County was divided off Wayne County on March 26, 1814, old Palmyra Township was divided between them. The division line of both the new county and of Palmyra Township, Pike County, was the Wallenpaupack River. The southwestern part of Palmyra Township (Wayne County) was separately incorporated in 1850 as Paupack Township, located along the northern banks of Lake Wallenpaupack.

== Geography ==
According to the United States Census Bureau, the township has a total area of 16.2 square miles (41.9 km^{2}), of which 15.9 square miles (41.2 km^{2}) is land and 0.3 square mile (0.7 km^{2}) (1.67%) is water.

== Demographics ==
Historical population
Census	Pop.	Note	%±
2010	1,339		—
2020	1,251		−6.6%

As of the census of 2010, there were 1,339 people, 551 households, and 381 families residing in the township. The population density was 84.2 inhabitants per square mile (32.5/km^{2}). There were 689 housing units at an average density of 43.3 per square mile (16.7/km^{2}). The racial makeup of the township was 96.5% White, 1.6% African American, 0.1% American Indian, 0.4% Asian, 0.6% from other races, and 0.7% from two or more races. Hispanic or Latino of any race were 2.8% of the population.

There were 551 households, out of which 24.5% had children under the age of 18 living with them, 56.3% were married couples living together, 8.5% had a female householder with no husband present, and 30.9% were non-families. 26.9% of all households were made up of individuals, and 13.7% had someone living alone who was 65 years of age or older. The average household size was 2.43 and the average family size was 2.95.

In the township the population was spread out, with 20.1% under the age of 18, 58.3% from 18 to 64, and 21.6% who were 65 years of age or older. The median age was 47.5 years.

The median income for a household in the township was $35,000, and the median income for a family was $40,781. Males had a median income of $30,938 versus $25,284 for females. The per capita income for the township was $19,359. About 6.1% of families and 11.1% of the population were below the poverty line, including 21.6% of those under age 18 and 10.1% of those age 65 or over.
