= Paupack Township, Pennsylvania =

Township in Pennsylvania, US

Paupack Township
- Township
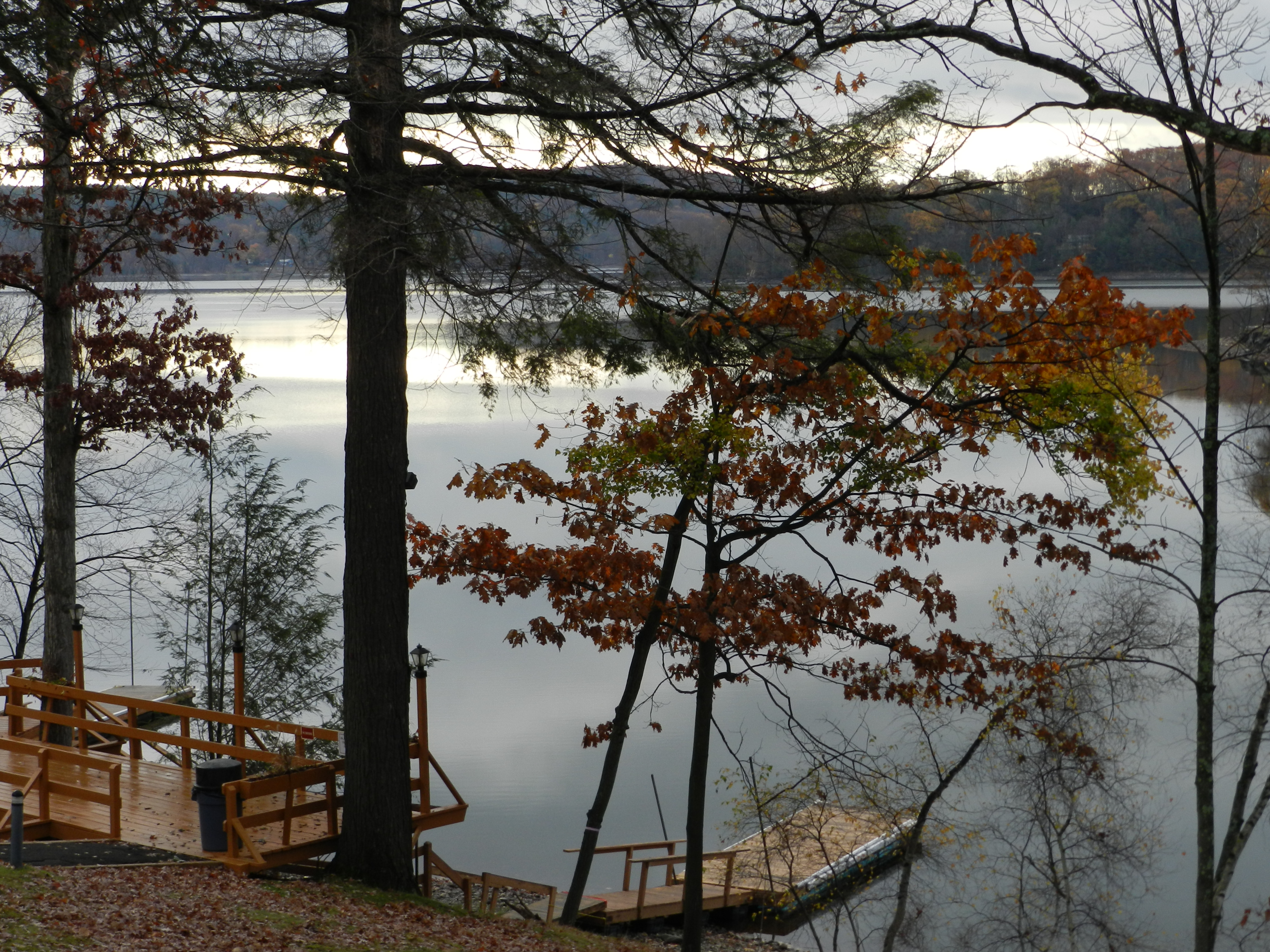

- Location in Wayne County and the state of Pennsylvania.

- Location of Pennsylvania in the United States
- Coordinates: 41°27′00″N 75°15′59″W
- Country: United States
- State: Pennsylvania
- County: Wayne

Area
  - Total: 33.14 sq mi (85.84 km^{2})
  - Land: 28.01 sq mi (72.55 km^{2})
  - Water: 5.14 sq mi (13.30 km^{2})
- Elevation: 1,417 ft (432 m)

Population (2010)
  - Total: 3,828
  - Estimate (2016): 3,690
  - Density: 131.7/sq mi (50.86/km^{2})
- Time zone: UTC-5 (EST)
  - Summer (DST): UTC-4 (EDT)
- Area code: 570
- FIPS code: 42-127-58480
- Website: Paupack Township

Paupack is a second-class township in Wayne County, Pennsylvania, United States. The township's population was 3,828 at the time of the 2010 United States Census.

== History ==
Paupack Township, located along the northern banks of Lake Wallenpaupack, was incorporated in 1850, from part of Palmyra Township.

Lacawac was listed on the National Register of Historic Places in 1979.

== Geography ==
According to the United States Census Bureau, the township has a total area of 33.2 square miles (86.0 km^{2}), of which 28.1 square miles (72.8 km^{2}) is land and 5.1 square miles (13.2 km^{2}) (15.36%) is water. It contains the census-designated place of Wallenpaupack Lake Estates.

== Demographics ==
Historical population
Census	Pop.	Note	%±
2010	3,828		—
2016 (est.)	3,690		−3.6%
U.S. Decennial Census

As of the census of 2010, there were 3,828 people, 1,643 households, and 1,172 families residing in the township. The population density was 136.2 inhabitants per square mile (52.6/km^{2}). There were 4,030 housing units at an average density of 143.4/sq mi. The racial makeup of the township was 97.3% White, 1.1% African American, 0.1% Native American, 0.4% Asian, 0.4% from other races, and 0.7% from two or more races. Hispanic or Latino of any race were 3.4% of the population.

There were 1,643 households, out of which 20.1% had children under the age of 18 living with them, 58.2% were married couples living together, 9.6% had a female householder with no husband present, and 28.7% were non-families. 23.5% of all households were made up of individuals, and 11.1% had someone living alone who was 65 years of age or older. The average household size was 2.33 and the average family size was 2.71.

In the township the population was spread out, with 17.1% under the age of 18, 58.2% from 18 to 64, and 24.7% who were 65 years of age or older. The median age was 51.1 years.

The median income for a household in the township was $38,179, and the median income for a family was $41,336. Males had a median income of $31,223 versus $21,757 for females. The per capita income for the township was $18,251. About 7.1% of families and 9.3% of the population were below the poverty line, including 14.1% of those under age 18 and 4.6% of those age 65 or over.
