= Wallenpaupack Area School District =

School district in Pennsylvania

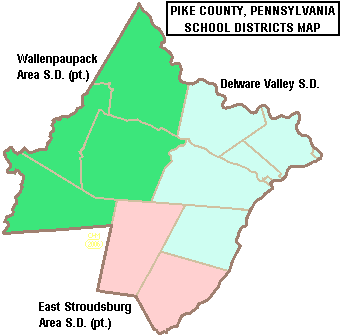

Address
- 2552 Route 6 Hawley, Pennsylvania, 18428-7045; United States

District information
- Type: Public school district

Students and staff
- Colors: Purple and White

Other information
- Website: www.wallenpaupack.org

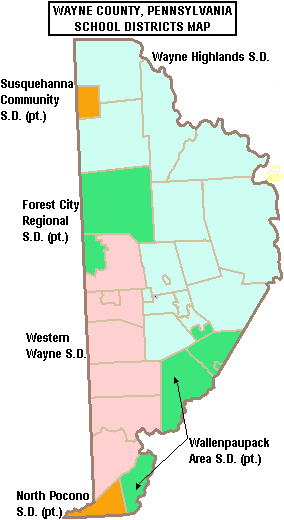
Wallenpaupack Area School District region in Wayne County

Wallenpaupack Area School District is a third-class school district in Pike and Wayne Counties in Pennsylvania. The district's population was 24,729 at the time of the 2010 United States Census.

The district encompasses approximately 321 square miles (830 km^{2}). According to federal census data, its population has increased by 3,991 residents from 20,738 residents in 2000. In 2009, the district residents’ per capita income was $19,073, while the median family income was $42,955. In the Commonwealth, the median family income was $49,501 and the United States median family income was $49,445, in 2010.

The school district operates six schools

- Wallenpaupack Area South Elementary, Newfoundland, PA (grades K-5)
- Wallenpaupack Area North Elementary, Hawley, PA (grades 3-5)
- Wallenpaupack Hawley Center, Hawley, PA (HeadStart)
- Wallenpaupack Area Middle School, Hawley, PA (grades 6-8)
- Wallenpaupack Area High School, Hawley, PA (grades 9-12)
- Wallenpaupack Primary School (grades K-2)

== Constituent municipalities ==
Unlike many school districts in Pennsylvania, Wallenpaupack Area is not subdivided into regions. However, it does contain the following municipalities (labeled by county):

- Blooming Grove Township (Pike)
- Dreher Township (Wayne)
- Greene Township (Pike)
- Hawley Borough (Wayne)
- Lackawaxen Township (Pike)
- Palmyra Township (Pike)
- Palmyra Township (Wayne)
- Paupack Township (Wayne)
- Texas Township (Wayne) (partially in the Wayne Highlands School District)

== Gun controversy ==
In early 2018, Hyung Jin Moon, co-founder of the World Peace and Unification Sanctuary Church and Southern Poverty Law Center-labeled "Anti-LGBT cult leader", announced an upcoming church event with guns. The event, a marriage vows renewal ceremony that asked participants to bring their AR-15 rifles, was to be held on February 28 in Newfoundland, Pennsylvania. Neighbors of the church came out to protest the insensitivity of having the AR-15 rifles at the event so soon after the Parkland, Florida shooting that killed 17 people. Due to the increased gun threat caused by Moon's ceremony, the students of Wallenpaupack Area South Elementary were relocated on February 28.
