= Lake Wallenpaupack =

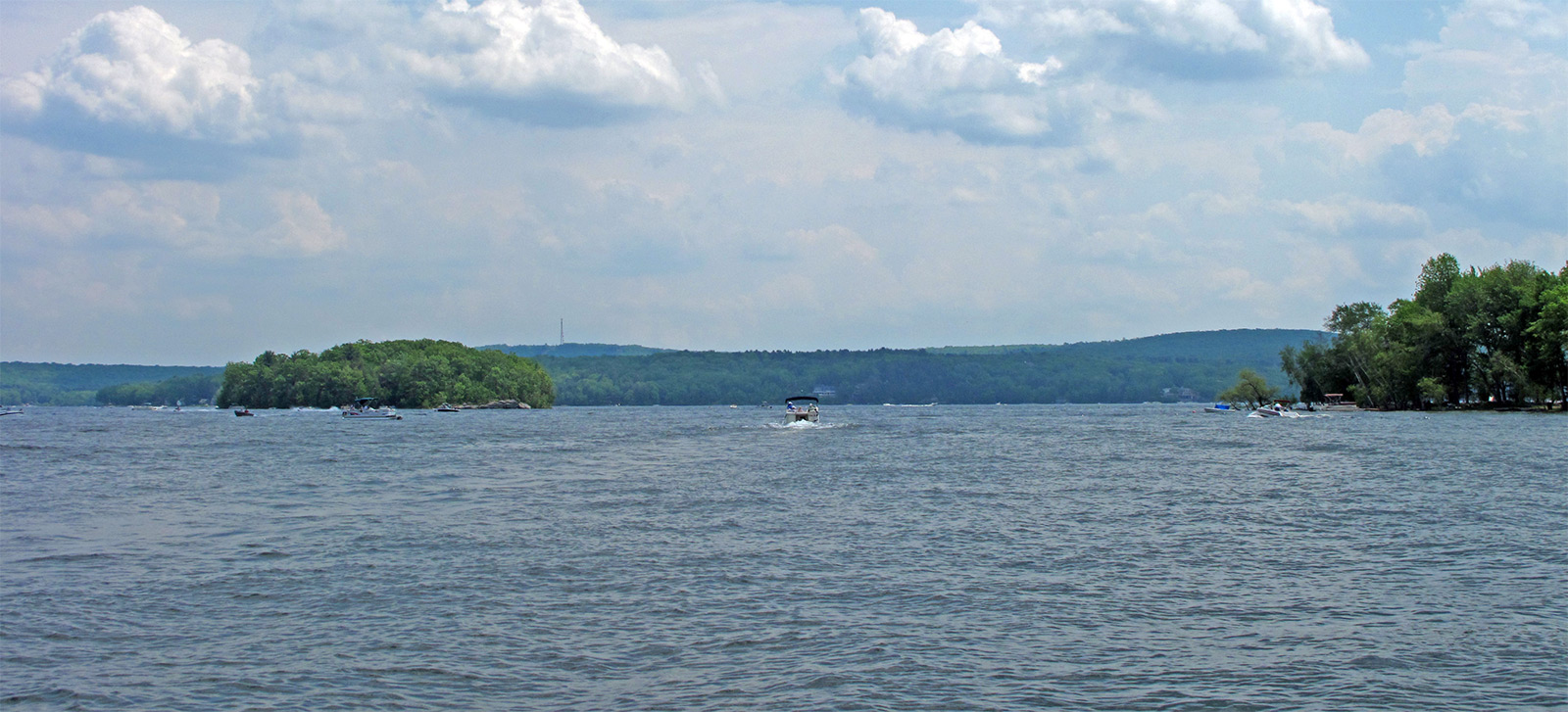

- Location within Pennsylvania Location within the United States
- Location: Pike / Wayne counties, Pennsylvania, United States
- Coordinates: 41°24′47″N 75°14′25″W
- Type: Reservoir
- Primary inflows: Wallenpaupack Creek
- Primary outflows: Lackawaxen River
- Basin countries: United States
- Max. length: 13 mi (21 km)
- Max. width: 1 mi (1.6 km)
- Surface area: 9 sq mi (23 km^{2})
- Average depth: 30 ft (9.1 m)
- Max. depth: 60 ft (18 m)
- Shore length^{1}: 52 mi (84 km)
- Surface elevation: 1,185 ft (361 m)
- Islands: Epply, Kipp, Burns, Cairns
- ^{1} Shore length is not a well-defined measure.

Lake Wallenpaupack (/ˌwɒlɪnˈpɔːpæk/) is a reservoir in Northeastern Pennsylvania. After Raystown Lake, it is the second-largest lake contained entirely in Pennsylvania. It comprises 52 mi (84 km) of shoreline, with a length of 13 mi (21 km) and a maximum depth of 60 ft (18 m), and has a surface area in excess of 5,700 acres (2,300 ha). It was created in 1926 by the PPL Corporation for hydroelectric purposes, as well as flood control, but it is best known as one of several major recreational destinations in the Pocono Mountains. It is located near the Borough of Hawley, and forms part of the boundary between Pike and Wayne counties.

== History ==
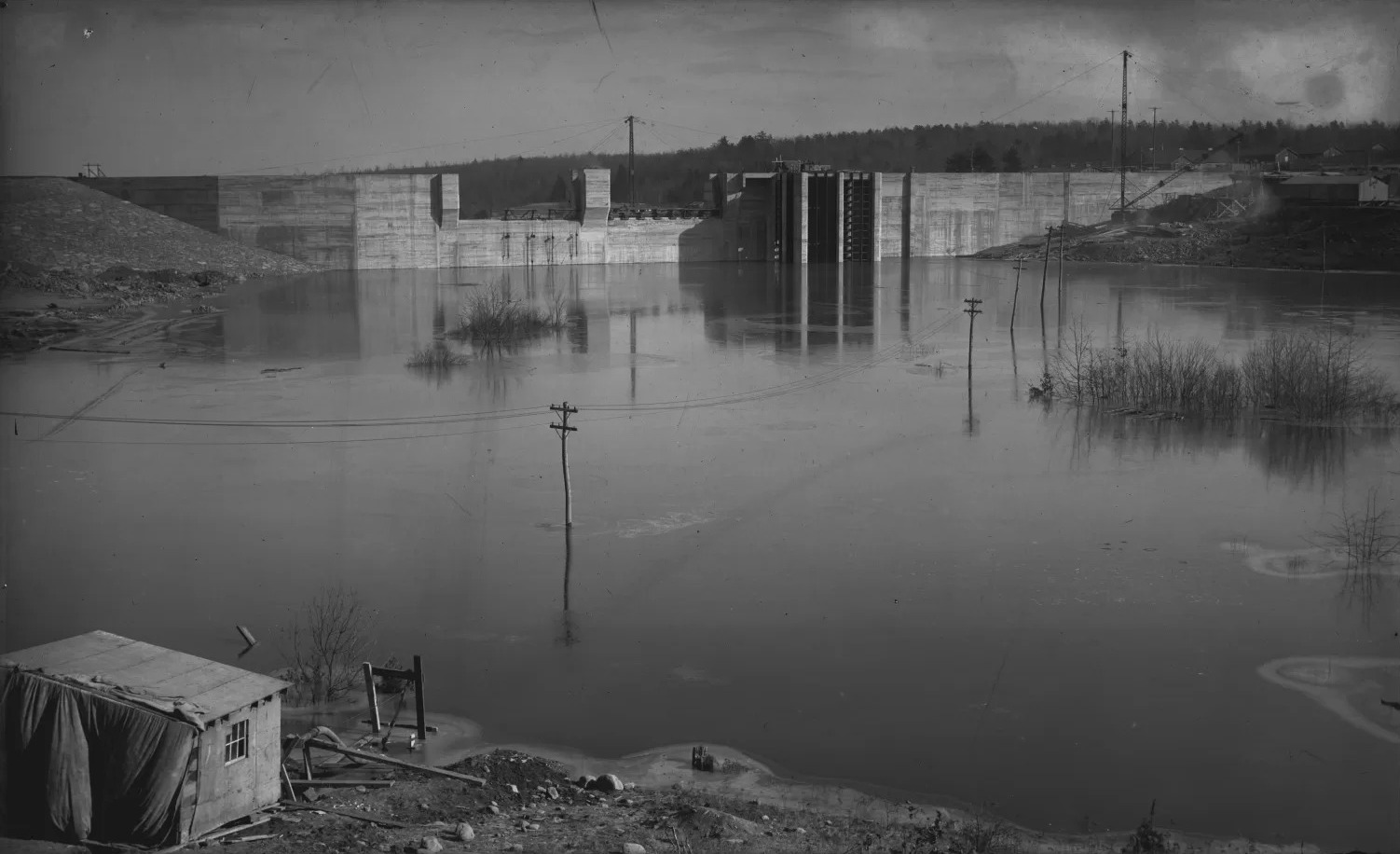
Wallenpaupack Dam under construction, 1925

The indigenous Lenape people named the area "Wallenpaupack" which means "the Stream of Swift and Slow Water." William Penn later owned the land and then deeded it to his son Thomas Penn. Upon his death, it went to the Penn estate, which sold about 12,000 acres (4,900 ha) in 1793 to James Wilson, one of the signers of the Declaration of Independence.

To create the lake, PPL Corporation constructed a dam on Wallenpaupack Creek at Wilsonville and a levee named the Tafton Dike. The project took 2,700 men from 1924 to 1926 to complete and seven months for the reservoir to fill after the dam was closed off. Land to be flooded was purchased by PP&L from about 100 owners at about $20 per acre ($50/ha), and most of the property was razed or moved. Some house foundations remained, and as the valley was flooded, the water was so clear that one could see the foundations under the water. Trees were cut, but stumps were not removed. In all, 17 miles (27 km) of roads and utility poles were rerouted, and Purdytown Cemetery had to be relocated. The former town of Wilsonville, which had been named after James Wilson, now lies under the water near the dam. The lake was officially opened to the public on July 31, 1926. Water travels 3 1/2 miles (5.5 km) in a 13 ft-diameter (4.0 m) steel pipe (originally wood) to power two turbines, which combined can generate 44 megawatts of power. Discharge is into the Lackawaxen River, which flows into the Delaware River.

PP&L managed the 3,300-acre (1,300 ha) of land around the lake until June 2015. While homeowners have access rights, they must apply for permits for installing landscaping or exterior lights and cannot cut down vegetation to improve their view of the lake without a permit — a provision to keep the man-made lake's shore natural-looking when viewed from the water and to minimize erosion.

PP&L knows every rock and tree on this shoreline, and they are very good stewards of the lake

— Jo-Ann Rose, Administrator for Palmyra Twp. in Pike County

== Climate ==
According to the Trewartha climate classification, Lake Wallenpaupack has a temperate continental climate (Dc) with warm summers (b), cold winters (o), and year-around precipitation (Dcbo). Dcbo climates are characterized by at least one month having an average mean temperature ≤ 32.0 °F (0.0 °C), four to seven months with an average mean temperature ≥ 50.0 °F (10.0 °C), all months with an average mean temperature < 72.0 °F (22.2 °C) and no significant precipitation difference between seasons. Although most summer days are comfortably humid at Lake Wallenpaupack, episodes of heat and high humidity can occur with heat index values morre than 93 °F (34 °C). Since 1981, the highest air temperature was 94.1 °F (34.5 °C) on August 6, 2001, and the highest daily average mean dew point was 70.8 °F (21.6 °C) on August 1, 2006. July is the peak month for thunderstorm activity which correlates with the average warmest month of the year. Since 1981, the wettest calendar day was 5.83 inches (148 mm) on September 17, 2004. During the winter months, the plant hardiness zone is 5b with an average annual extreme minimum air temperature of −13.1 °F (−25.1 °C). Since 1981, the coldest air temperature was −27.9 °F (−33.3 °C) on January 21, 1994. Episodes of extreme cold and wind can occur with wind chill values < −26 °F (−32 °C). The average snowiest month is January which correlates with the average coldest month of the year. Ice storms and large snowstorms depositing ≥ 12 inches (30 cm) of snow occur nearly every year, particularly during nor’easters from December through March.

Climate data for Lake Wallenpaupack, Elevation 1,188 ft (362 m), 1981-2010 normals, extremes 1981-2018
Month	Jan	Feb	Mar	Apr	May	Jun	Jul	Aug	Sep	Oct	Nov	Dec	Year
Record high °F (°C)	63.2 (17.3)	72.2 (22.3)	82.5 (28.1)	87.8 (31.0)	91.0 (32.8)	90.7 (32.6)	93.9 (34.4)	94.1 (34.5)	91.0 (32.8)	83.1 (28.4)	79.0 (26.1)	67.5 (19.7)	94.1 (34.5)
Mean daily maximum °F (°C)	32.2 (0.1)	35.3 (1.8)	43.6 (6.4)	56.0 (13.3)	67.1 (19.5)	75.1 (23.9)	78.7 (25.9)	78.1 (25.6)	71.0 (21.7)	59.8 (15.4)	48.2 (9.0)	36.4 (2.4)	56.9 (13.8)
Daily mean °F (°C)	22.5 (−5.3)	25.0 (−3.9)	32.9 (0.5)	44.6 (7.0)	55.2 (12.9)	64.0 (17.8)	67.9 (19.9)	66.9 (19.4)	59.4 (15.2)	48.0 (8.9)	38.6 (3.7)	27.7 (−2.4)	46.2 (7.9)
Mean daily minimum °F (°C)	12.9 (−10.6)	14.8 (−9.6)	22.1 (−5.5)	33.2 (0.7)	43.4 (6.3)	53.0 (11.7)	57.1 (13.9)	55.7 (13.2)	47.7 (8.7)	36.3 (2.4)	29.0 (−1.7)	18.9 (−7.3)	35.4 (1.9)
Record low °F (°C)	−27.9 (−33.3)	−17.3 (−27.4)	−10.0 (−23.3)	9.9 (−12.3)	25.1 (−3.8)	31.4 (−0.3)	40.4 (4.7)	35.9 (2.2)	26.6 (−3.0)	16.3 (−8.7)	−1.9 (−18.8)	−17.2 (−27.3)	−27.9 (−33.3)
Average precipitation inches (mm)	2.82 (72)	2.55 (65)	3.18 (81)	3.62 (92)	3.99 (101)	4.46 (113)	3.89 (99)	3.77 (96)	4.21 (107)	4.18 (106)	3.37 (86)	3.32 (84)	43.36 (1,101)
Average snowfall inches (cm)	15.7 (40)	11.2 (28)	11.7 (30)	2.8 (7.1)	0.0 (0.0)	0.0 (0.0)	0.0 (0.0)	0.0 (0.0)	0.0 (0.0)	0.1 (0.25)	3.0 (7.6)	9.4 (24)	53.8 (137)
Average relative humidity (%)	73.5	68.8	63.6	60.3	62.9	72.5	72.7	74.4	75.1	71.4	71.3	73.7	70.0
Average dew point °F (°C)	15.3 (−9.3)	16.2 (−8.8)	21.9 (−5.6)	31.7 (−0.2)	42.8 (6.0)	55.0 (12.8)	58.8 (14.9)	58.5 (14.7)	51.5 (10.8)	39.2 (4.0)	30.1 (−1.1)	20.4 (−6.4)	36.9 (2.7)
Source: PRISM

== Hydrology ==
The lake's surface area is approximately 5,700 acres (2,300 hectares). It was created by the construction of a 70-foot-tall (21 m) dam and the Tafton Dike at the east end. The largest inflow into Lake Wallenpaupack is Wallenpaupack Creek, at the west end of the lake. The dividing line between the lake and the creek is the Ledgedale Road bridge. East Wallenpaupack Creek extends south through Newfoundland and into the northern edge of Monroe County. West Wallenpaupack Creek extends to Mt Cobb and Lake Henry. Streams directly entering the lake include Waynewood, Goose Pond, Purdy, Strohs, Lyons and Beach House creeks, and Stony, Spring Hill, Seeleys and Mill brooks.

Because the lake exists to generate hydroelectric power, every spring the water level is allowed to rise to a target elevation of 1,187 ft (362 m) for June 1, then during the summer and early fall, progressively lower until it reaches 1,179 ft (359 m). Late fall and into early spring the water level is maintained at 1,181–1,182 ft (360–360 m). Snowpack melt is used to raise the water level during April and May. People with waterfront property move their private docks out as the water recedes (see photos). Docks and buoys must be removed from the lake to above the high water line by December 1 and not placed back in the lake until after ice is gone. Homeowners along the lake have access rights but not privacy rights - anyone can walk along the shoreline below the high water line. Fences or other barriers are not allowed.

== Ownership changes ==
In June 2014 PP&L announced it would be divesting its electrical generation facilities. Plans called for a spin-off to a newly created company Talen Energy formed from the generation assets of PP&L and Riverstone Holdings. On June 1, 2015 Talen Energy became the official owner of Wallenpaupack Hydroelectric Project generation plant and therefore control, under the FERC license, of Lake Wallenpaupack. In order to comply with a FERC regulation, on October 8, 2015 Talen Energy announced plans to sell the Lake Wallenpaupack hydroelectric project to Brookfield Renewable Partners L.P. of Toronto, Canada. The sale was completed on April 1, 2016. Brookfield maintains website information about its management of Lake Wallenpaupack.

== Recreation ==
An integral part of the Lake Region of the Pocono Mountains, Lake Wallenpaupack is a recreation attraction in the tri-state area (Pennsylvania, New Jersey and New York), particularly in the summertime. The lake provides boating, swimming, and fishing access in the summer, as well as snowmobiling, ice skating and ice fishing in the winter. A free boat launch facility for trailered boats is located at Mangan Cove, located off of State Route 590. There are launch-for-fee access areas at Caffrey, Ironwood Point, Ledgedale and Wilsonville. The lake has no boat horsepower limit. Boat speeds are limited to 25 mph (40 km/h; 22 kn) between sunset and sunrise. Summer weekends, daytime boat speeds are limited to 45 mph (72 km/h; 39 kn). The lake's wooded shoreline provides opportunities for hiking and viewing wildlife, including whitetail deer and black bear. Shuman Point has parking and a three-mile (five-kilometer) trail of moderate difficulty. Lake fish include smallmouth bass, largemouth bass, rock bass, bluegill, walleye, muskellunge, northern pike, pickerel, rainbow trout, brown trout, catfish and yellow perch. Walleye, striped bass and hybrid striped bass have been stocked in the lake. The lake is 13 miles (21 km) long, has 52 miles (84 km) of shoreline, and is about 60 feet (18 m) deep at its maximum depth.

There are four islands, all open to the public for daytime visits but no overnight camping; from east to west: Epply, Kipp, Burns and Cairns. Kipp may be closed to the public until August because bald eagles have established a nest site on the island and return to it most years.

The last weekend of August hosts Wally Lake Fest, a three-day weekend of events scattered on and around the lake and in the neighboring town of Hawley, including the live music Wallypalooza held on docks floating in front of the Tafton Dike. A notable activity during the winter months on Lake Wallenpaupack is its annual "Ice Tee Golf Tournament", which takes place on the frozen lake. The tournament is a 9-hole competition hosted by The Chamber of the Northern Poconos.

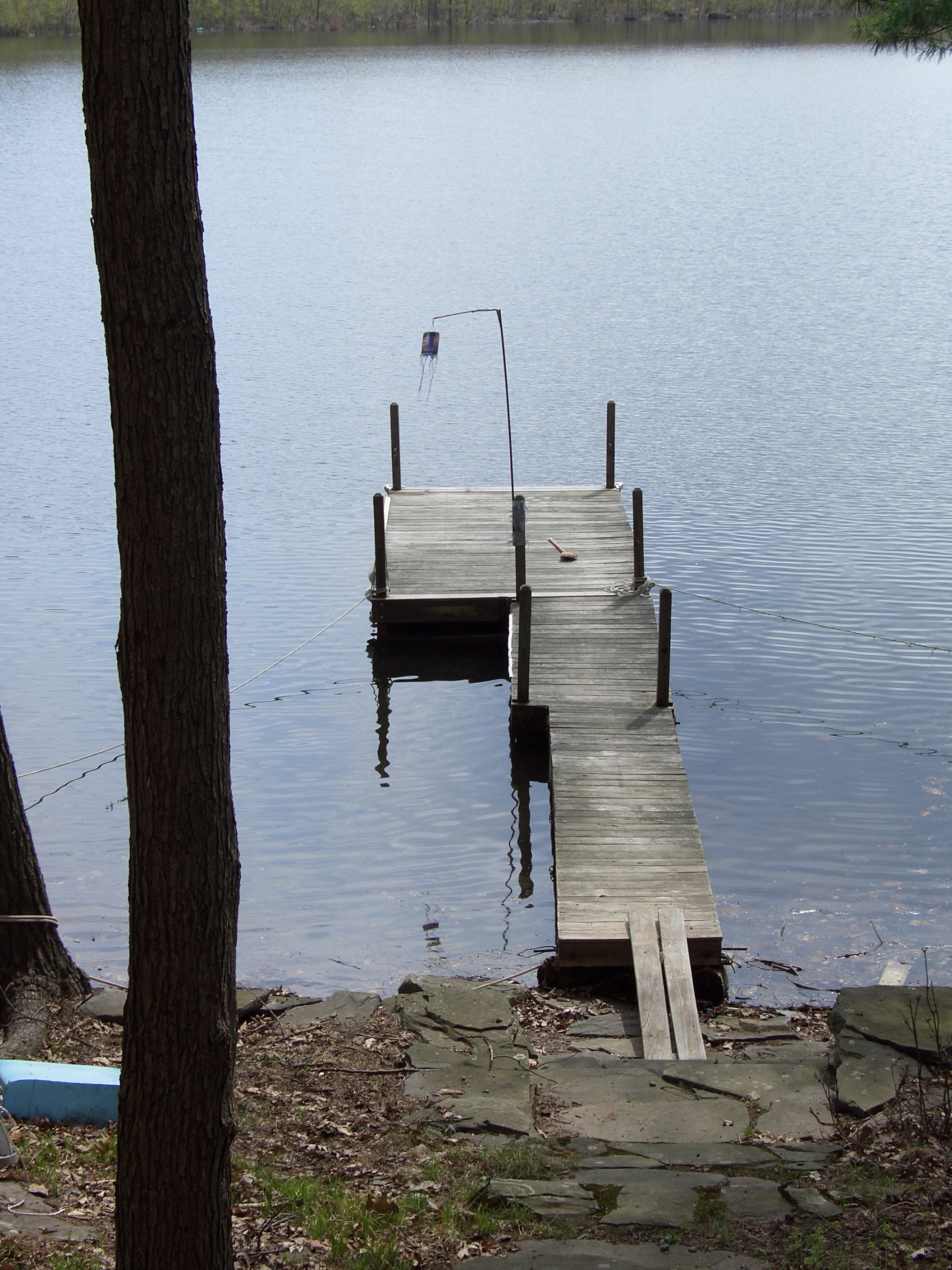
Dock in spring when water level is high

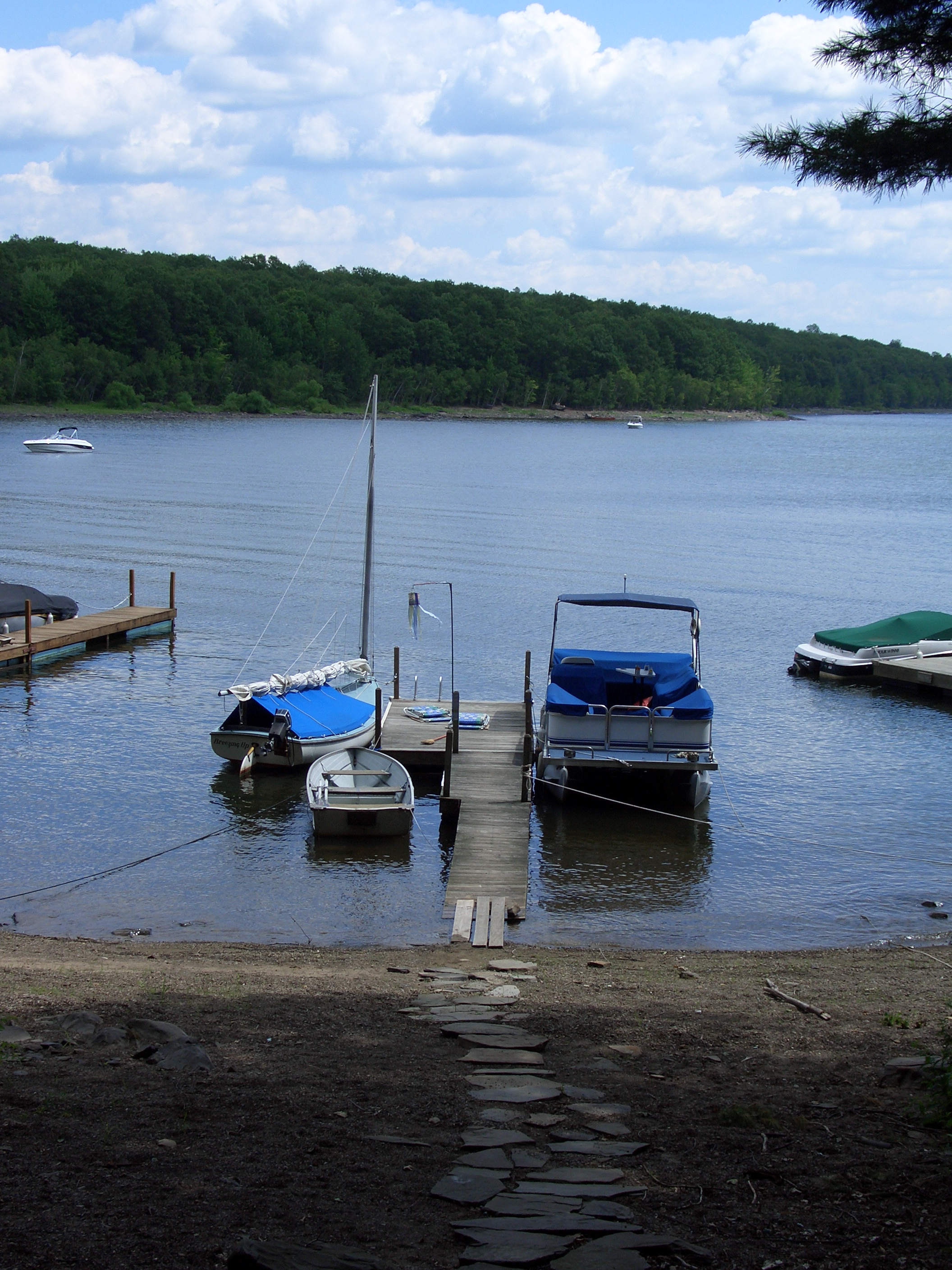
Same dock in summer when water level is lower; held in place with ropes to shore

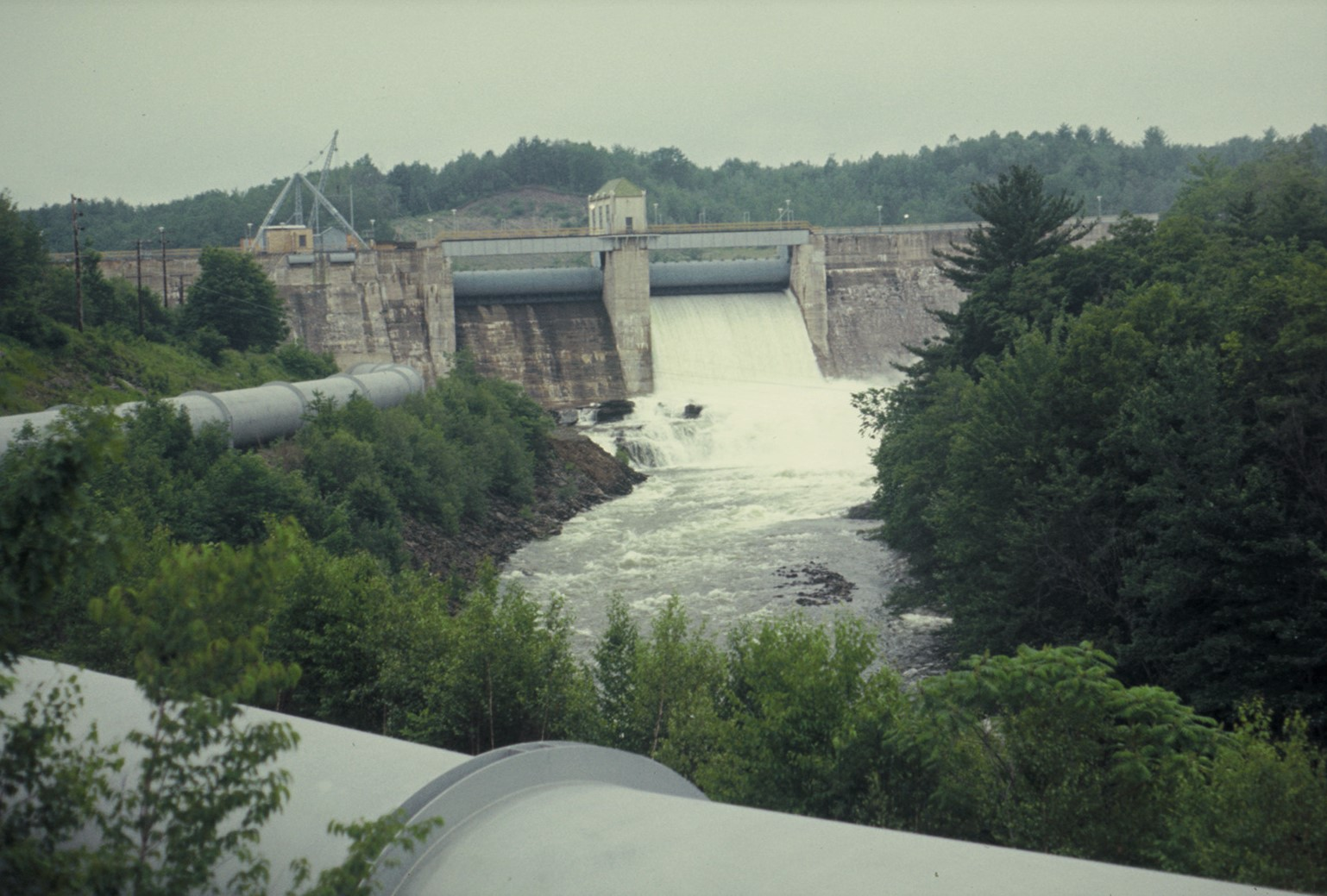
Dam, with water flowing after a hurricane had caused record high water. The flume (large pipe) transports water to generator, miles away.

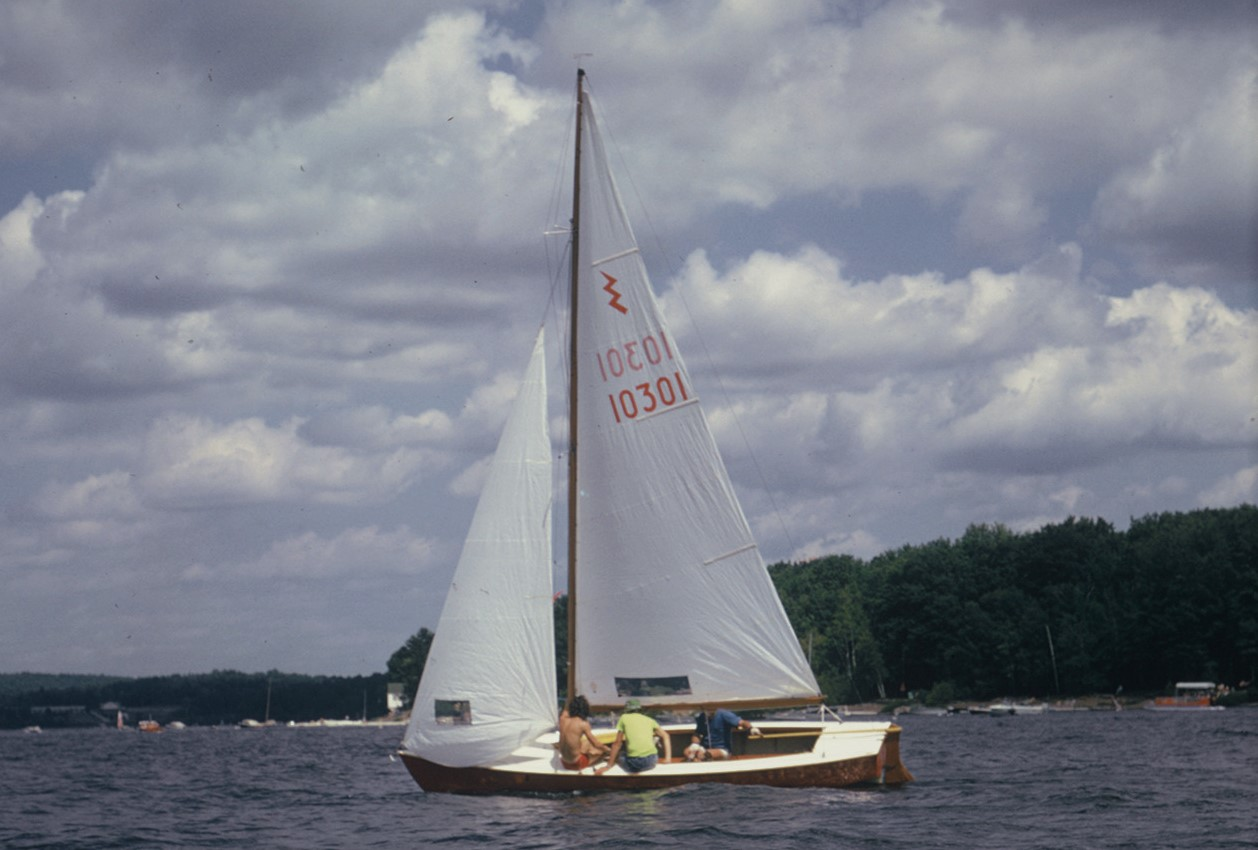
Lightning class sailboat; motorboating, water skiing and fishing also popular

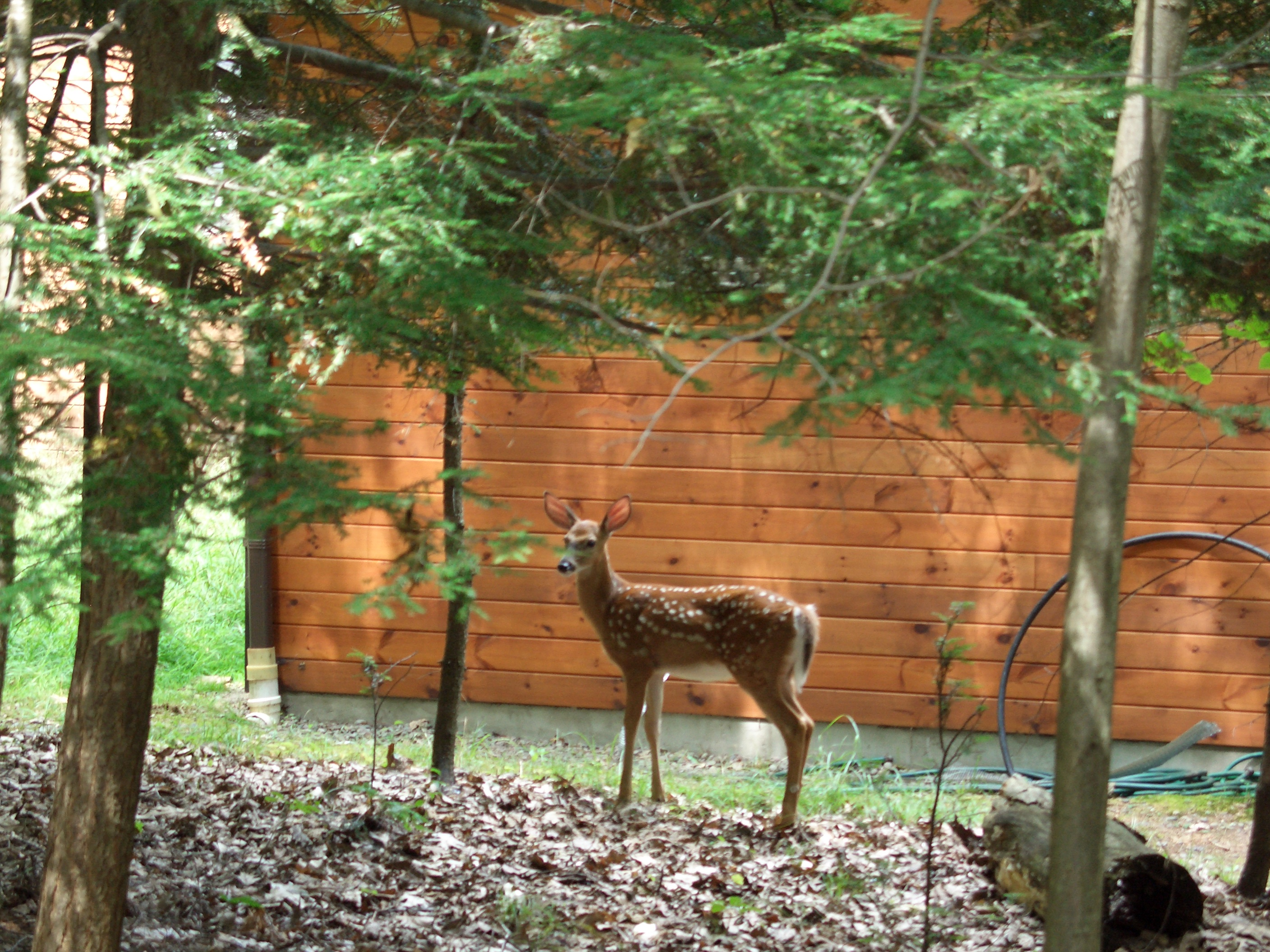
Whitetail deer are frequently seen near houses and on roads

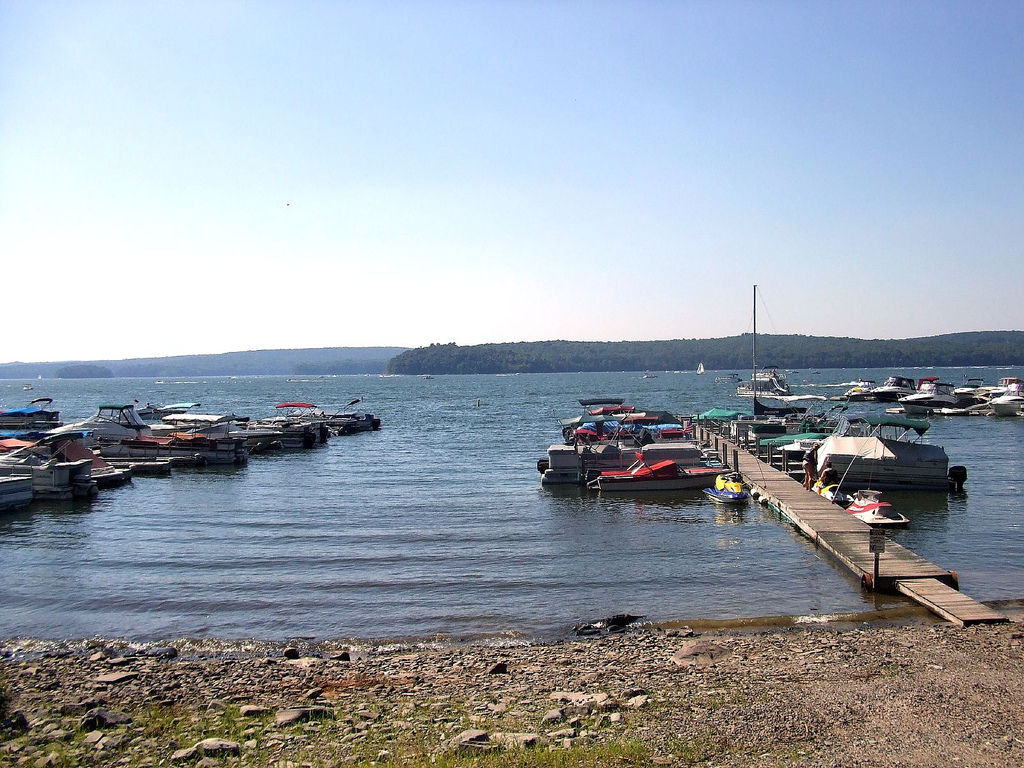
View from east shore looking west (up lake). Epply Island visible left side

== Water ecology ==
Lake Wallenpaupack faces a number of environmental problems, including water-quality issues from heavy boat usage, algal blooms and rapid sedimentation related to agricultural runoff, and an invasion of purple loosestrife along the shores. Concerted efforts to improve water quality led to the lake being removed from Pennsylvania's list of impaired waters in 2016, twenty years after having been so designated. The lake is used as an educational resource to teach ecology to students of the Wallenpaupack Area School District. The Lake Wallenpaupack Watershed Management District (LWWMD) is a nonprofit organization started in 1979 and dedicated to improving the water quality of the lake.

== Land ecology ==
According to the A. W. Kuchler U.S. potential natural vegetation types, Lake Wallenpaupack would have a transient dominant vegetation type of Appalachian Oak (104) and Northern Hardwood (106) with a transient vegetation form of Eastern Hardwood Forest and Northern hardwood forest. Groves of Eastern hemlock ( T. canadensis) trees are dying because of infestation with the sap-sucking insect Adelges tsugae (hemlock woolly adelgid). The peak spring bloom typically occurs in early-May and peak fall color usually occurs in early-October. The plant hardiness zone is 5b with an average annual extreme minimum air temperature of −13.1 °F (−25.1 °C).

The Commonwealth of Pennsylvania established Wildlife Management Units (WMUs) in 2003. Lake Wallenpaupack, which is on the dividing line of Wayne and Pike counties, is in WMU 3D. Statewide, deer over-population had had a negative impact on plant ecology due to over-browsing of ground cover and young trees. As of 2018, the deer population is estimated at 1,500,000 which corresponds to a population density of 30/sq mi (12/km^{2}). Traditional hunting practices had allowed shooting of only antlered male deer. This fostered a large sex-ratio imbalance and fast population growth. Pennsylvania instituted antlerless hunting to manage the over-population problem. In 2003, 465,000 deer were shot during hunting season, and the female to male ratio was 2.25:1. In 2018, 375,000 deer were shot and the ratio had decreased to 1.5:1. The harvest in the WMU 3D area around Lake Wallenpaupack is 8,000 to 10,000 deer per year.

== In popular culture ==
- Lake Wallenpaupack was featured as a retreat location in the popular TV show The Office in the eleventh episode of the second season, "Booze Cruise". However, the episode was not filmed on Lake Wallenpaupack (which would have been frozen, as the event was described as taking place in January). Principal filming took place in Long Beach Harbor, California. It is also mentioned in the season 3 episode "Traveling Salesmen" when Michael and Andy are on a sales call.
- The lake is the setting of the children's book Baked Beans for Breakfast (1970; republished in 1974 as The Secret Summer) by Ruth Chew.
- Cove Haven Resort, a couples-only hotel, with heart-shaped bathtubs, has been in business since 1958, and is part of the reason the Poconos are referred to as a “Honeymoon Capital of the World."
- The lake is referenced in the title of the 2020 EP The Phantasm at Lake Wallenpaupack by the Vermont-based rock band Fever Dolls.
- The lake is referenced in Abbott Elementary in season two, episode thirteen when Ava is talking about her jet ski fund.
