= Academy Hill Historic District =

Academy Hill Historic District may refer to:

- Academy Hill Historic District (Andover, Massachusetts), listed on the NRHP in Massachusetts
- Westminster Village-Academy Hill Historic District, Westminster, MA, listed on the NRHP in Massachusetts
- Union Street-Academy Hill Historic District, Montgomery, NY, listed on the NRHP in New York
- Academy Hill Historic District (Statesville, North Carolina), listed on the NRHP in Iredell County, North Carolina
- Academy Hill Historic District (Greensburg, Pennsylvania), listed on the NRHP in Pennsylvania
- Academy Hill Historic District (Stroudsburg, Pennsylvania), listed on the NRHP in Monroe County, Pennsylvania
