= Lynching of Richard Puryear =

1894 lynching of African American man in Stroudsburg, Pennsylvania, U.S.

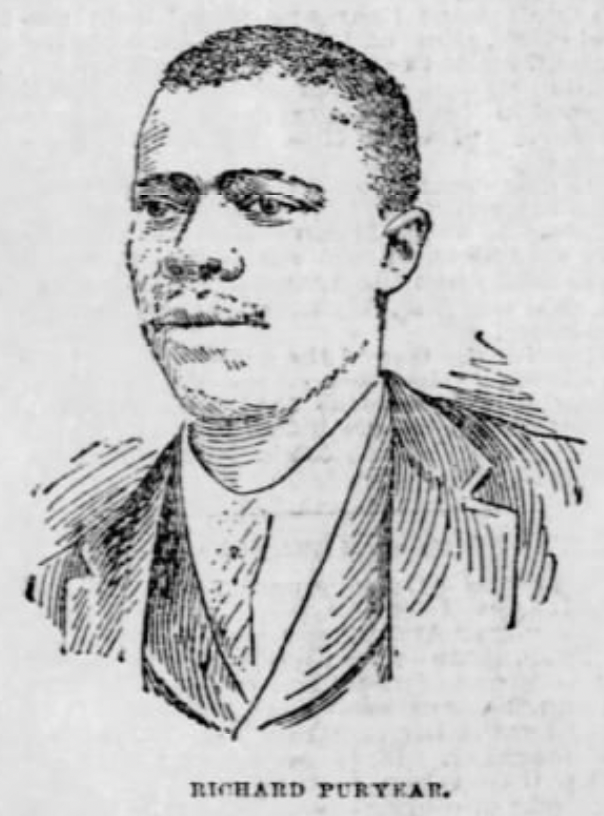
- Richard Puryear, lynching victim
- Location: Stroudsburg, Pennsylvania, US
- Date: March 15, 1894
- Attack type: Lynching
- Deaths: 1
- Victim: Richard Puryear
- Perpetrator: White mob
- No. of participants: 50–200

The lynching of Richard Puryear took place on March 15, 1894, at Stroudsburg, Monroe County, in the U.S. state of Pennsylvania. A mostly white mob seized and hanged Richard Puryear, a Black railroad worker accused of murdering a white storekeeper, after he escaped from prison. A grand jury investigated the lynching, but no members of the mob faced criminal charges or convictions in Puryear's murder.

== Background ==
Little is known of Puryear's life before 1894. He was a Black man, about 35 years old, who had worked as foreman for gang of track laborers on the Willkes-Barre and Eastern Railroad, and he had lived in Virginia before moving to northeastern Pennsylvania to work on the railroad. According to the Boston Daily Globe, Puryear was one of numerous Black Southerners who had recently moved north to work on the railroad and lingered after the track's completion, "encamped as tramps near the towns along its route." Crime allegedly surged in the wake of the Black migrants, and racial tensions bubbled in Stroudsburg and its environs.

In the village of Tannersville on the evening of February 23, 1894, a middle-aged white storekeeper by the name of Christian Ehlers invited Richard Puryear into his house to discuss "commonplace matters." The two men had known each other and had transacted business dealings for more than a year. Inside the house, Puryear allegedly shot Ehlers dead and gravely wounded the merchant's wife, Louisa Ehlers. He allegedly then stole thirty-five dollars, "taking all the money he could find" before fleeing. Puryear was arrested the following day, charged with murder, and locked up in the Monroe County jail in downtown Stroudsburg.

== Lynching attempt ==
In the afternoon of March 1, reports reached Sheriff J. M. Kresge of a lynch mob gathering ten miles outside of town. The sheriff responded quickly, swearing in twenty-five special deputies, arming them, and positioning them in and around the jail. The mob reached Stroudsburg at 12:30 AM on March 2 and reached the jail at 1 AM. Many were drunk. The mob broke into a blacksmith's shop and seized sledge hammers and chisels to break into Puryear's cell. Papers reported that the mob was led by neighbors of the Ehlers, but two ringleaders named by The New York Times, merchant James W. Wilson and farmer Luther M. Michaels, lived in Mount Pocono and Shawnee, miles from the scene of the tragedy. Outside the jail, local dignitaries, including former congressman John B. Storm, mayor C. L. Edinger, and district attorney John B. Williams, sought to calm the mob.

Shouting "Hang the n***er!" the mob attempted to batter down the jail doors, using wooden planks as battering rams. Police officers wielding clubs eventually repelled the mob and forced it to disperse, though not before the doors were nearly battered in. Fifty of the attackers sustained injuries, mostly black eyes, bruised heads, and at least one broken nose. Deputies inside the jail had received "positive orders" to open fire on the attackers should the mob break through the doors. One of the ringleaders, James Wilson, was arrested and jailed in the same facility as Puryear. Although the mob threatened to try again, The New York Times expressed optimism that "the officials are able to cope with any mob." No second attack on the jail materialized.

== Escape and lynching ==
During the night of March 14, Puryear jimmied the door of his cell and slipped into the jail corridor, where he hid in an empty room until Sheriff Kresge arrived in the morning to deliver breakfast to the prisoners. At seven o'clock, Puryear slipped out the open door of the corridor as the sheriff was setting down the prisoners' plates and bolted the door behind him, locking Kresge in jail. The fugitive then dashed through the sheriff's kitchen and out of the jail and sprinted through vacant lots and streets crowded with men heading to work, seeking to escape into the woods outside Stroudsburg. Courthouse janitor William Van Guder spotted the escaping prisoner and raised a hue and cry. Over a dozen men joined the chase as Puryear ran down Main Street.

As Puryear neared Pocono Creek, another pursuer, Benjamin (surname variously reported as Burns or Cuentou or Kuenton) a Black man who had worked with Puryear on the railroad and known him in Virginia from childhood and now worked at Palmer's slaughterhouse nearby, cut him off. Puryear swam the fast-flowing creek but emerged on the other side exhausted. He scrambled into some laurel bushes, ducking gunfire from his pursuers. Kuenton, a tall and strong man armed with a revolver given him by his employer, captured Puryear and marched him back to his pursuers, whose ranks had swollen to between 50 and 200 men. The mob howled, "Lynch him!" Puryear did not resist. He either uttered no word or told the mob, "Do as you please."

Members of the mob swiftly procured a block and tackle used to hoist slaughtered cattle, mounting the device onto a stout white oak or maple tree near the creek. Without hesitation, the mob dragged Puryear to the tree and looped a noose around his neck. Dozens of men seized the end of the stout sixty-foot length of manila rope and hoisted Puryear into the air so sharply that his head smashed into a tree limb, possibly rendering him unconscious, as he went limp instantly. Puryear was dead within twenty minutes of his escape. The pursuit had covered approximately one mile before he was caught.

Puryear's body dangled from the tree until ten o'clock. Hundreds of townspeople, including many women and children, gathered to gawk at the body and collect souvenirs. The crowd took up a collection on the spot for Kuenton and awarded him fifteen dollars. They also presented him with the rope used to hang Puryear. Kuenton sliced up the rope and sold it to spectators for 25 cents per piece. A reporter found him trying to sell the knot for $1.50.

At ten o'clock, almost three hours after the lynching, Monroe County authorities finally ordered the rope cut and the body transported to the jail. The body was coffined and on March 16 was publicly displayed in the jail corridor, where thousands of people walked through to view Puryear's remains.

Residents of Stroudsburg objected to burying Puryear in the town cemetery, so according to an account in the Pocono Record, "the body was sent by express to George Willet, Philadelphia, to be used at the University of Pennsylvania for dissecting purposes" on March 17. The medical dissection took place on March 23 under the supervision of Dr. Holmes. "The head was, however, retained," reported the Philadelphia Inquirer without elaborating.

== Aftermath ==
No members of the mob wore a mask or any other disguise. Despite scores of witnesses to the lynching, on March 17, a Stroudsburg coroner's jury brought in a verdict of death by hanging committed by persons unknown. Issued after the jury heard from only six witnesses, the verdict was delayed because two of the jurors wanted to issue a statement commending the lynch mob. The jury censured Sheriff Kresge for negligence in permitting the prisoner to escape. The jury consisted of six men, hangers-on at the scene of the lynching, empaneled by Justice of the Peace Harrison Drake.

Rejecting the coroner's jury's findings, Governor Robert E. Pattison and Attorney General W. U. Hensel instructed the county district attorney to investigate the lynching and prosecute those responsible. "In the sake of the good name of the commonwealth," reported the Pittsburgh Post-Gazette on March 24, "he [Gov. Pattison] has expressed a desire to see all connected with the lynching punished." A grand jury was duly empaneled under Judge Craig, but because every eyewitness denied recognizing any of the mob, the jury wrapped up on June 1, having "failed to throw any light upon the lynching."

== Coverage ==
A 2010 study from the Pennsylvania Historical and Museum Commission observed that contemporary newspaper accounts were biased against Puryear, and their accuracy was therefore suspect. A Philadelphia Inquirer headline proclaimed that the "murderer" was "made to pay the penalty." The New-York Tribune concluded its piece on the first lynching attempt by writing, "Have no fear but that the negro will get his just deserts in a proper manner." The National Police Gazette, known for its sensationalism, railed against the "ingratitude" and "ferocity" of Puryear's alleged assault on the Ehlers.

Despite taking Puryear's guilt for granted, the press largely criticized the lynching. A Stroudsburg newspaper, the Jeffersonian, blamed the murder on "a few hot-headed youths and weak-minded men [who] unwittingly inaugurated the Southern and border civilization in our midst." The Philadelphia Inquirer lauded the Jeffersonian's editors for demonstrating the difference "between Northern and Southern civilization" through its "courageous" stance, in contrast with the tendency in the South to downplay and justify lynching. The New York Press denounced the lynching of a "helpless prisoner" in the heart of a "highly civilized commonwealth," especially when there was "no fear of a miscarriage of justice" given the strength of the evidence against Puryear.
