= Abdul Jaludi =

American businessman

- Born: March 15, 1960 (age 66)
- Education: FAA licensed airplane mechanic
- Occupation: Author
- Website: www.tag-mc.net

Abdul Jaludi is an American author and adviser specializing in Command Center, Event Management, Monitoring, Incident Management, and Problem Management.

He has written two books, along with numerous reports and articles on IT leadership. In 2012, he was the winner of a global innovation contest looking for the best ideas for the future of banking The writing and publishing of Command Center Handbook: Proactive IT Monitoring in 2014 established him as an expert in the field of command centers and operational efficiency in IT operations.

In 2009, he founded a self-service application called WAIS (web automated information system) that performs automated user requests on mainframes and distributed systems including Windows, Unix, and other operating systems.

He is the founder of Technology Advisory Group (TAG-MC) and has been featured in Smart Enterprise Exchange, including The Pocono Record, and Smart Enterprise Exchange documents.

== Career ==
Jaludi began his career in data center operations as an entry-level tape librarian with Citicorp in 1985 on Wall Street in New York City.

Abdul left Citicorp in 1985 for a performance management role at Lehman Brothers but returned to the command center two years later. Abdul remained with Citigroup, where he rose to the position of Senior Vice President, managing the North America Enterprise Systems Management team, which was responsible for command center alerting and automation. WAIS was chosen by the Citigroup security standards committee as the global tool for emergency access requests. He left Citigroup in 2013 under questionable circumstances.

A believer in the benefits of proactive monitoring and transparency within the field of information technology, he began writing about effective leadership and IT best practices. His blog in Smart Enterprise Exchange led him to write books on process improvements from a leader's perspective and command centers.

In 2013, unable to find a book on command centers, he researched, drew from his experience as a command center manager, designer, and builder, and wrote the first book on the subject.

Abdul also publishes under the pen names Atticus Aristotle and O.M. Kiam.

== Books ==
- Jaludi, Abdul (2014). Command Center Handbook: Proactive IT Monitoring – Protecting business value through operational excellence. Milford, PA: Milford Press. pp. 168 pages. ISBN 978-1494760526.
- Jaludi, Abdul (2012). The Art of Process Improvement. Milford, PA: Milford Press. pp. 78 pages. ISBN 978-1470161965.
