= Pocono Airlines =

IATA	ICAO	Call sign
–	—	—
- Commenced operations: July 1, 1965; 59 years ago
- Ceased operations: 1990; 35 years ago
- Operating bases: Pocono Mountains Municipal Airport, Wilkes-Barre/Scranton International Airport
- Fleet size: See Fleet below
- Founder: Walter E. ("Wally") Hoffman Jr.

Pocono Airlines was a regional airline operating out of Pocono Mountains Municipal Airport and Wilkes-Barre/Scranton International Airport, founded by Walter E. ("Wally") Hoffman Jr.

== History ==
The inaugural flight was made on July 1, 1965 using a Beechcraft 18 N136L and a Piper Aztec N5508Y.

In 1967, Allegheny Airlines was embarking on replacing its own commuter airline service with services operated by independently contracted commuter airlines, and entered into negotiations with Pocono to take over certain Allegheny commuter routes. In 1968, Allegheny and Pocono entered into an outsourcing agreement covering service between Hazleton, Pennsylvania and Newark, New Jersey. Later that year, the agreement was extended to also include service between Wilkes-Barre and Newark. Pocono continued to add routes as an Allegheny commuter operator, including service from Wilkes-Barre to New York City in 1972 and service between Williamsport and Newark in 1974. Service to Hazleton proved unprofitable for Pocono by 1975, and the airline discontinued Hazleton service the next year.

By 1986 the airline had been unprofitable for two years and had a negative equity of $445,797 at the end of 1985.

The airline suspended operations in 1990 after failing to recover from a Chapter 11 reorganization.

== Fleet ==
- Piper Aztec
- Beechcraft 18
- Nord 262
- SA227 Metroliner

== See also ==
- List of defunct airlines of the United States
