= Mount Pocono, Pennsylvania =

Borough in Pennsylvania, US

- Borough
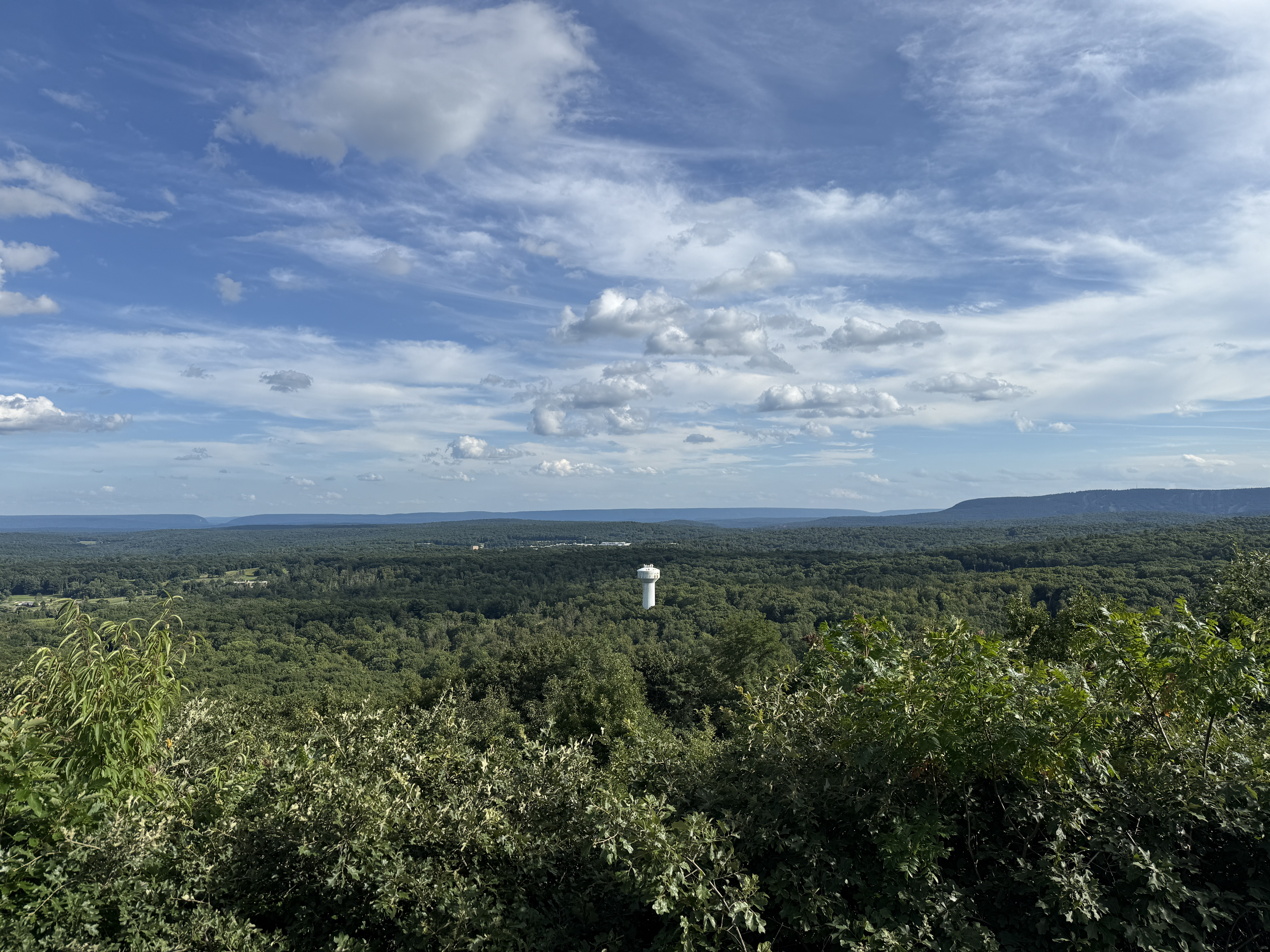
- Mount Pocono Knob Lookout, looking south toward Delaware Water Gap and Camelback Mountain

- Seal

- Location of Mount Pocono in Monroe County, Pennsylvania

- Location of Mount Pocono in Pennsylvania Mount Pocono (the United States)
- Coordinates: 41°07′23″N 75°21′34″W
- Country: United States
- State: Pennsylvania
- County: Monroe
- Incorporated: 1927

Government
  - Mayor: Randy Altemose

Area
  - Total: 3.46 sq mi (8.95 km^{2})
  - Land: 3.46 sq mi (8.95 km^{2})
  - Water: 0.0039 sq mi (0.01 km^{2})
- Elevation: 1,988 ft (606 m)

Population (2020)
  - Total: 3,089
  - Density: 894.3/sq mi (345.31/km^{2})
- Time zone: UTC-5 (EST)
  - Summer (DST): UTC-4 (EDT)
- ZIP code: 18344
- Area codes: 570 and 272
- FIPS code: 42-51912
- Website: mountpocono-pa.gov

Mount Pocono is a borough in Monroe County, Pennsylvania. The borough serves as a local highway nexus, and sees much tourist traffic making use of resources in the region. As of the 2020 census, the borough population was 3,083 residents.

== Geography ==
Mount Pocono is located at 41°7′23″N 75°21′34″W (41.123012, −75.359574), and is nearly centered in Monroe County—the most southerly and centered county of the five counties containing portions of the Pocono Mountains of Northeastern Pennsylvania. The region's valleys includes left bank tributaries of the Lehigh River in the southern half, and as the mountain ranges narrow closer to New York, they are instead drained by left bank tributaries of the Susquehanna River. To the east, all Poconos ridge lines drain into the Delaware River or right bank tributaries of the Delaware.

According to the U.S. Census Bureau, the borough has a total area of 3.5 square miles (9.0 km^{2}), all of it land.

== Demographics ==
Historical population
Census	Pop.	Note	%±
1930	466		—
1940	648		39.1%
1950	619		−4.5%
1960	935		51.1%
1970	1,019		9.0%
1980	1,237		21.4%
1990	1,795		45.1%
2000	2,742		52.8%
2010	3,170		15.6%
2020	3,089		−2.6%
2021 (est.)	3,097	▲	0.3%

=== 2020 census ===
As of the 2020 census, Mount Pocono had a population of 3,089. The median age was 43.4 years. 20.0% of residents were under the age of 18 and 20.4% of residents were 65 years of age or older. For every 100 females there were 96.1 males, and for every 100 females age 18 and over there were 91.5 males age 18 and over.

99.1% of residents lived in urban areas, while 0.9% lived in rural areas.

There were 1,255 households in Mount Pocono, of which 29.2% had children under the age of 18 living in them. Of all households, 38.2% were married-couple households, 19.4% were households with a male householder and no spouse or partner present, and 34.2% were households with a female householder and no spouse or partner present. About 31.8% of all households were made up of individuals and 17.8% had someone living alone who was 65 years of age or older.

There were 1,448 housing units, of which 13.3% were vacant. The homeowner vacancy rate was 2.6% and the rental vacancy rate was 11.2%.

Racial composition as of the 2020 census
Race	Number	Percent
White	1,694	54.8%
Black or African American	643	20.8%
American Indian and Alaska Native	23	0.7%
Asian	107	3.5%
Native Hawaiian and Other Pacific Islander	0	0.0%
Some other race	266	8.6%
Two or more races	356	11.5%
Hispanic or Latino (of any race)	721	23.3%

=== 2010 census ===
As of the census of 2010, there were 3,170 people, 1,225 households, and 793 families residing in the borough. The population density was 792.2 inhabitants per square mile (305.9/km^{2}). There were 1,417 housing units at an average density of 358.0 per square mile (138.2/km^{2}). The racial makeup of the borough was 58.6% White, 18.6% Black or African American, 0.2% Native American, 2.2% Asian, 0.1% Pacific Islander, 0.2% from other races, and 2.4% from two or more races. Hispanic or Latino people of any race were 17.7% of the population.

There were 1,225 households, out of which 32.0% had children under the age of 18 living with them, 43.8% were married couples living together, 16.0% had a female householder with no husband present, and 35.3% were non-families. Of all households 20.9% were made up of individuals, and 29.6% had someone living alone who was 65 years of age or older. The average household size was 2.58 and the average family size was 3.22.

In the borough, the population was spread out, with 25.5% under the age of 18, and 14.8% who were 65 years of age or older. The median age was 39.0 years.

United States presidential election results for Mount Pocono, Pennsylvania
Year	Republican		Democratic		Third party(ies)	
Year	No.	%	No.	%	No.	%
2024	575	43.07%	746	55.88%	14	1.05%
2020	563	38.75%	874	60.15%	16	1.10%
2016	521	43.20%	656	54.39%	29	2.40%
2012	425	38.92%	656	60.07%	11	1.01%
2008	460	37.77%	748	61.41%	10	0.82%
2004	536	47.81%	575	51.29%	10	0.89%
2000	466	49.95%	443	47.48%	24	2.57%

== Public education ==
Pocono Mountain School District (PMSD) is the public school system for students living in Mount Pocono.

PMSD is divided into two parts, the East and the West districts. Mount Pocono is the East district, comprising Pocono Mountain East High School for grades 9-12, Pocono Mountain East Junior High School serving students in the seventh and eighth grades, Swiftwater Intermediate School for grades 4, 5, and 6, and students from kindergarten through third grade attend the Swiftwater Elementary Center. The PMSD also offers the PMSD Cyber Program, a comprehensive cyber school alternative for grades K-12. The program is free to all students in the district.

== History ==
Early 19th-century settlers used the area for lumbering. The "New Mount Pocono" post office was established in 1848. The town's name was changed in 1864 to "Forks", because of its five-way intersection where Pennsylvania Route 611 and Pennsylvania Route 940 cross and Pennsylvania Route 196 begins. The name was changed again in 1886 to "Mount Pocono". The Delaware, Lackawanna and Western Railroad provided transportation from New York City and Philadelphia. Mount Pocono quickly developed as a summer resort, advertising clean mountain air, spring water, luxury hotels and excellent fishing.

Initially, the town was part of Coolbaugh Township. In 1927, Mount Pocono borough was incorporated on its own.

The boom times lasted into the mid-20th century. Most of the resort hotels burned or closed, and passenger service to the town ended in 1965.

Mount Airy Lodge in nearby Paradise Township grew into an 895-room mega-resort. In the mid- and late-20th century it was a popular honeymoon destination, famous for its heart-shaped bathtubs. It closed in 2001, and was demolished. Casino gambling in Pennsylvania became legal in 2004. Mount Airy Casino Resort was built on the Mount Airy Lodge's lakeside site, and opened in 2007.

=== Resort hotels ===
- Pine Hill Lodge (1875), still in business, 11 guest rooms
- Pocono Mountain House (1878, burned 1973), 250 guest rooms
- Princess Poconita Resort (1880), now Whispering Hills Motel
- Pocohasset House (demolished 1938), 100 guest rooms
- Ontwood Resort (c. 1890s, burned 1979), 150 guest rooms
- Mount Pleasant House (burned 1968), 150 guest rooms
- Mount Airy Lodge (1898, closed 2001, demolished). At its peak in the 1960s, the hotel had 895 guest rooms.
- Montanesca Hotel (1901, burned 1911), 125 guest rooms
- The Meadowside (burned 1926)
- Hawthorne Inn (1909, demolished)
- Strickland's Mountain Inn (c. 1900, demolished 2007). Began as The Elvin, sold to Strickland in 1945.
- Devonshire Pines (1912, demolished), 200 guest rooms
- The Belmont (burned 1963)

Currently, Mount Pocono serves as the commercial center for the northern part of Monroe County. Stores from national and regional chains and others are in the borough. Many businesses are members of the Mount Pocono Association (formerly the Mount Pocono Business Association).

== Transportation ==
=== Roads and highways ===
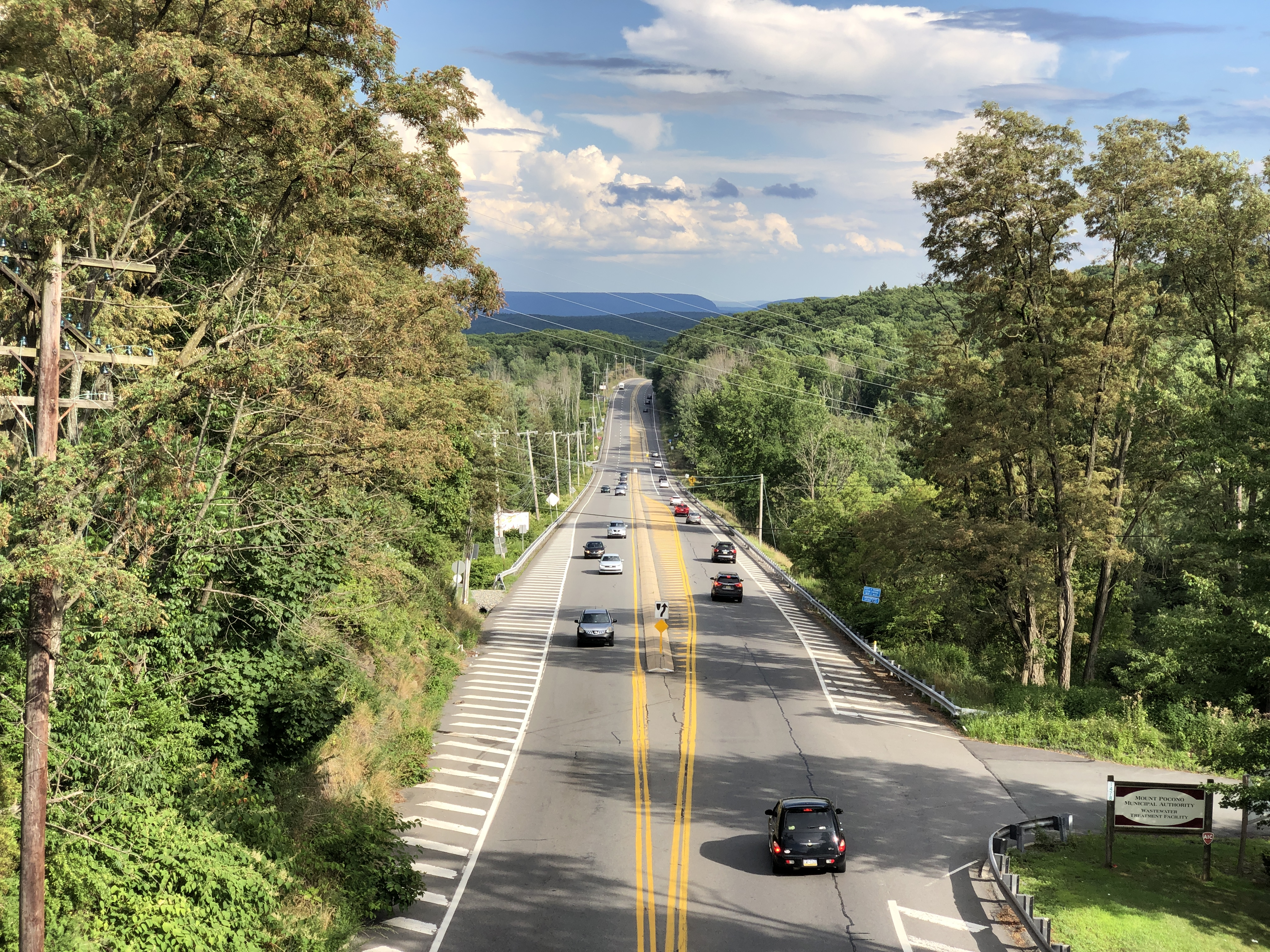
PA 611 southbound in Mount Pocono

As of 2017, there were 21.55 miles (34.68 km) of public roads in Mount Pocono, of which 5.60 miles (9.01 km) were maintained by the Pennsylvania Department of Transportation (PennDOT) and 15.95 miles (25.67 km) were maintained by the borough.

Pennsylvania Route 196, Pennsylvania Route 611 and Pennsylvania Route 940 are the numbered highways serving Mount Pocono. PA 940 follows a southwest-northeast alignment through the center of the borough. PA 611 follows a northwest-southeast alignment through the middle of the borough. Finally, PA 196 begins at the intersection of PA 611 and PA 940 and heads north through the northern portion of the borough.

=== Railroad ===
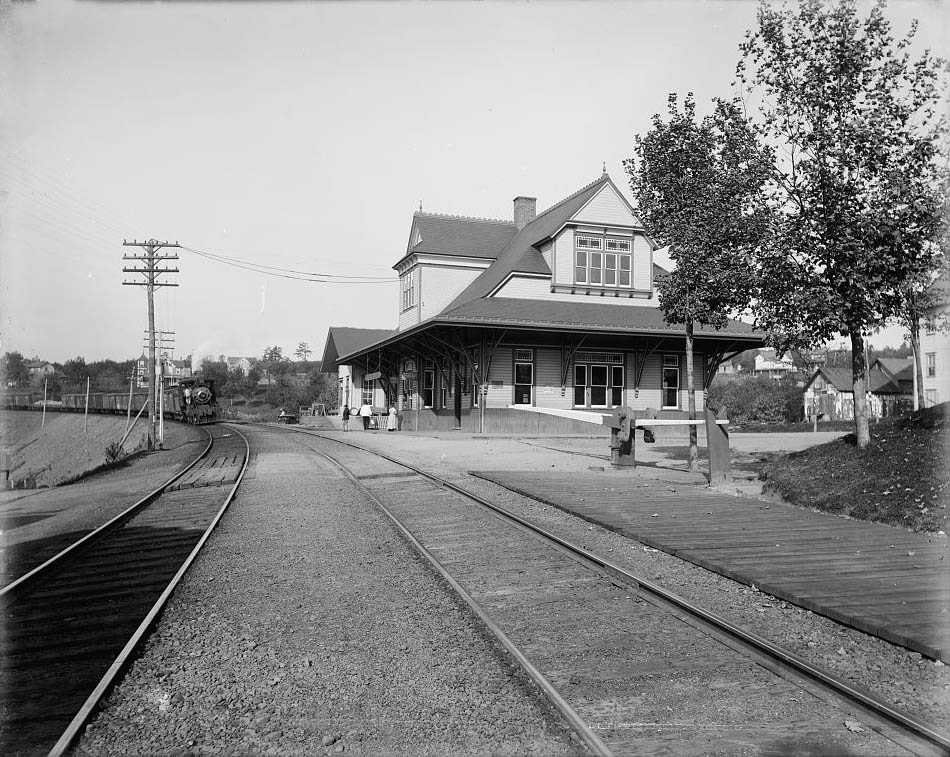
Mt. Pocono station, D.L. & W.R.R., c. 1895

The main line of the Delaware, Lackawanna and Western Railroad passed through the southern end of the borough, providing access from New York City via the terminal at Hoboken, New Jersey. A passenger station was built at the crossing of Pennsylvania Route 611 in 1886. Most of the station was demolished in 1937 when the highway was widened. Regular passenger service to the borough ended in 1965. The D., L. & W. tracks now carry freight trains of the Delaware-Lackawanna Railroad and an occasional excursion train from Steamtown National Historic Site.

=== Bus ===
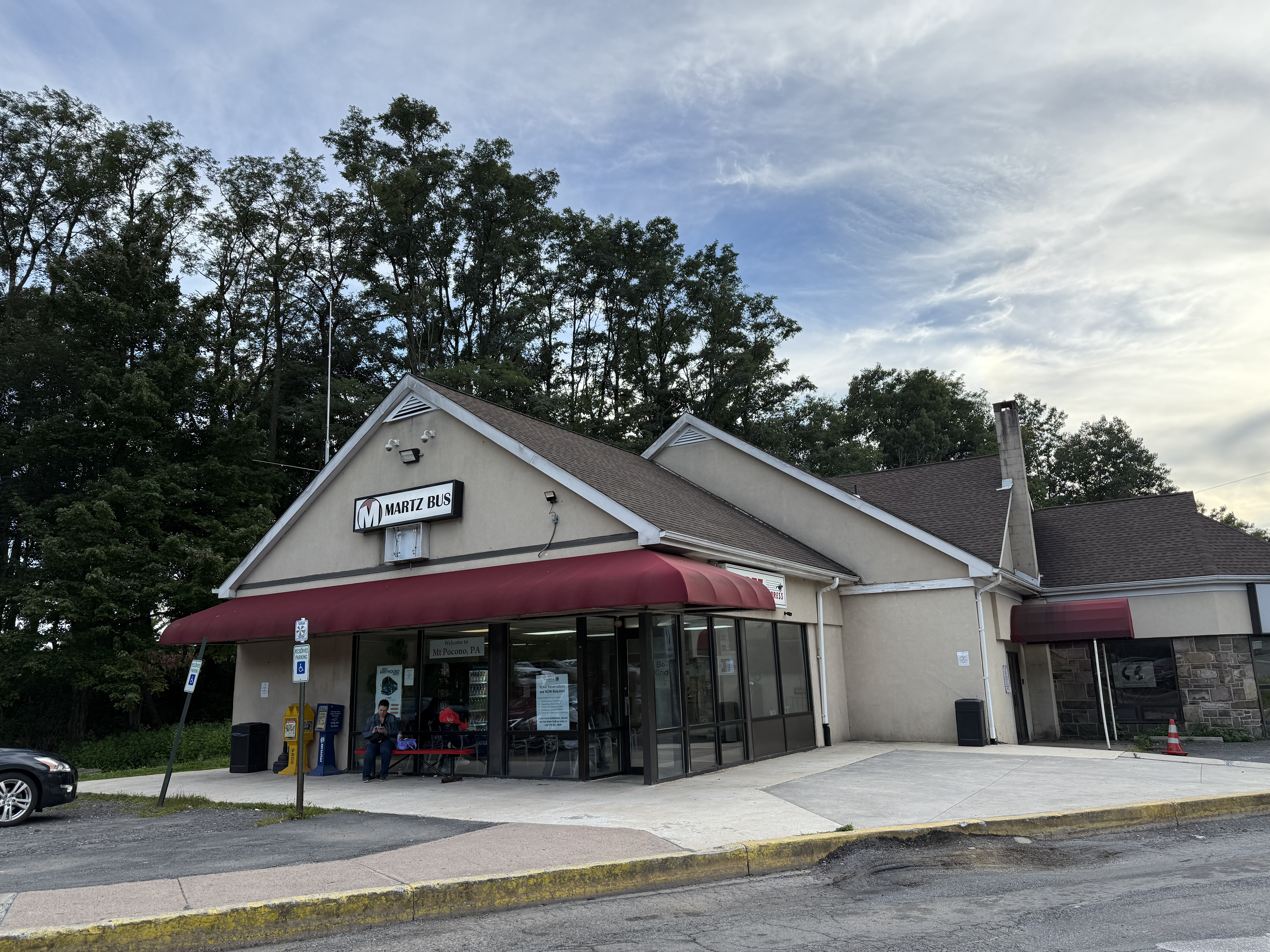
Martz Bus station in Mount Pocono

The Monroe County Transit Authority (MCTA) serves Monroe County with five bus routes. The Authority's Blue Route serves Mount Pocono's Main Street (Pocono Blvd.) with northbound service to Tobyhanna and southbound service to Tannersville and the Bartonsville. Connections to other MCTA routes are provided at the Giant supermarket. Martz Trailways and Greyhound Lines provide intercity bus service to Mount Pocono at the Martz Express bus station, with Martz Trailways connecting Mount Pocono with the Port Authority Bus Terminal in New York City and Greyhound Lines connecting Mount Pocono with Philadelphia and Scranton. There are also various van companies in the Uptown Vans network that provide service to Paterson and New York City.

=== Air ===
Pocono Mountains Regional Airport is located two miles north of the borough.

== Media ==
Pocono Record is a daily newspaper in the Poconos. Its coverage area centers on Stroudsburg and East Stroudsburg and will occasionally cover Mount Pocono news. It currently has fewer than 60 subscribers in Mount Pocono. It is part of the Gannett/USA Today network.

The Pocono Plateau is a publication of the Journal Newspapers located in White Haven, Pennsylvania. It has covered Tobyhanna Township, Coolbaugh Township, and the Mount Pocono Borough for over twenty years. The community newspaper is published monthly or bi-monthly at various times of the year and is distributed free at grocery stores and restaurants in the area.

The Boro community newspaper was originally established in 2018 as an online news and information site for Mount Pocono Borough residents. In February 2020, it began printing a monthly newspaper. In July 2020, it expanded coverage to include adjacent Coolbaugh and Tobyhanna Townships. The Boro is delivered by mail to every home and business in Mount Pocono and distributed at nearly 100 controlled distribution sites throughout the area. Starting in September 2020, it began publishing every other week as The Boro & Towne News and expanded mailing to include residents of Tobyhanna and Coolbaugh.

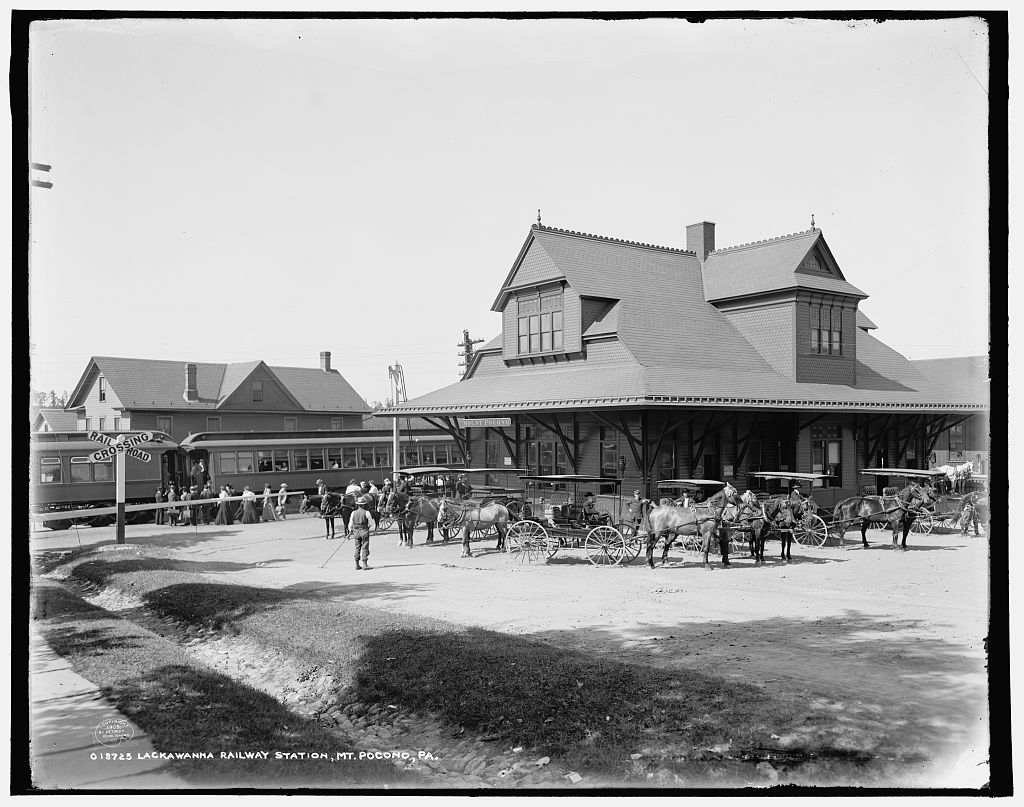
Mount Pocono Station (1886, demolished 1937), c. 1905

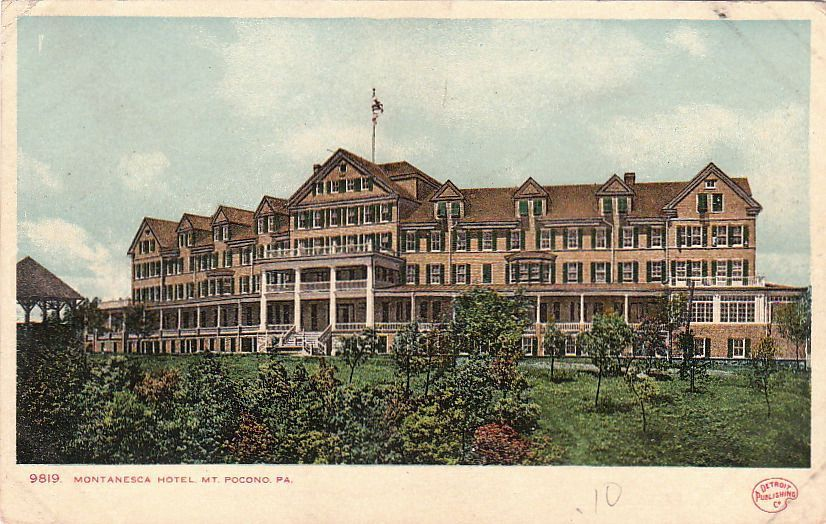
Montanesca Hotel (1901, burned 1911)

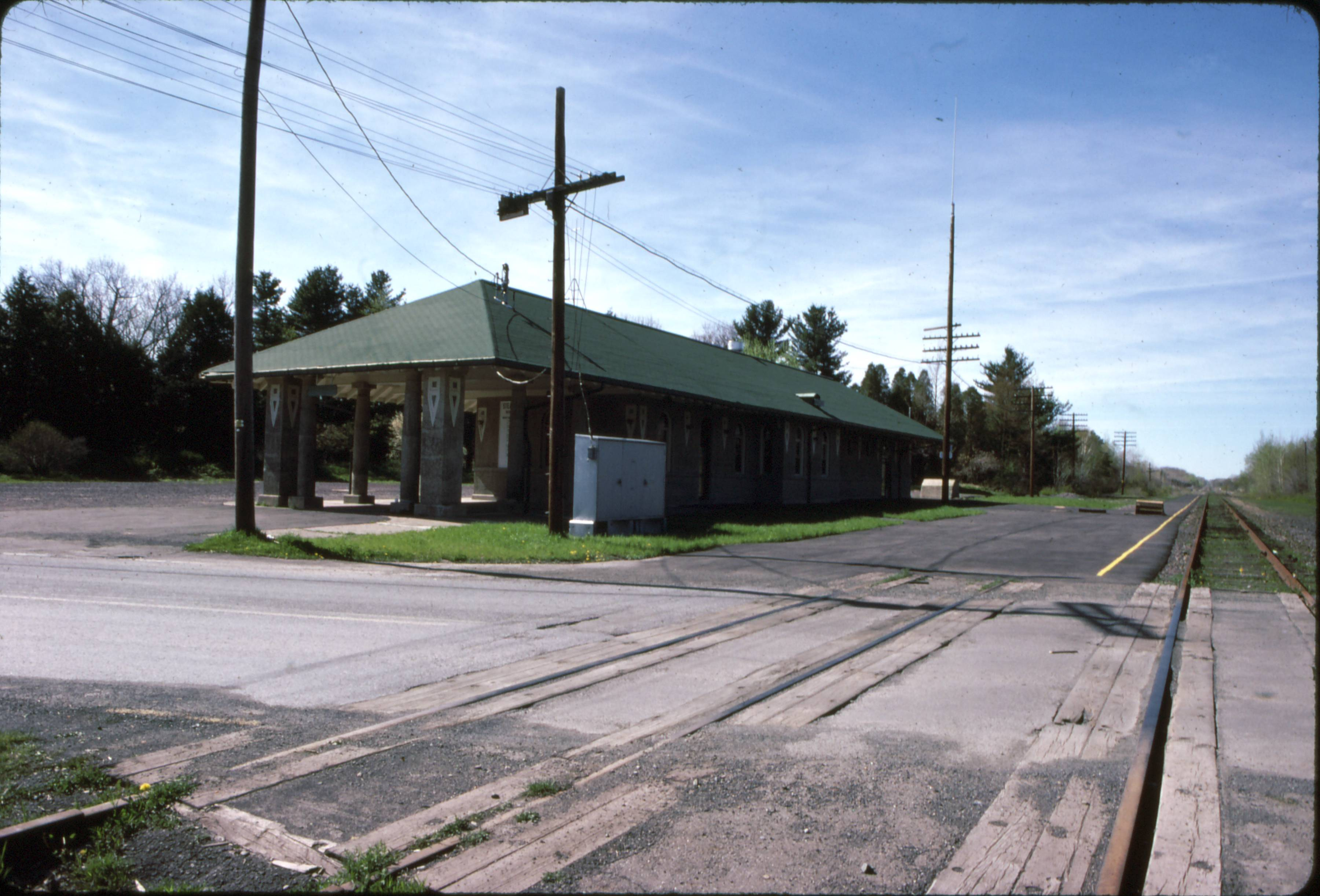
Pocono Summit Station, in 1988

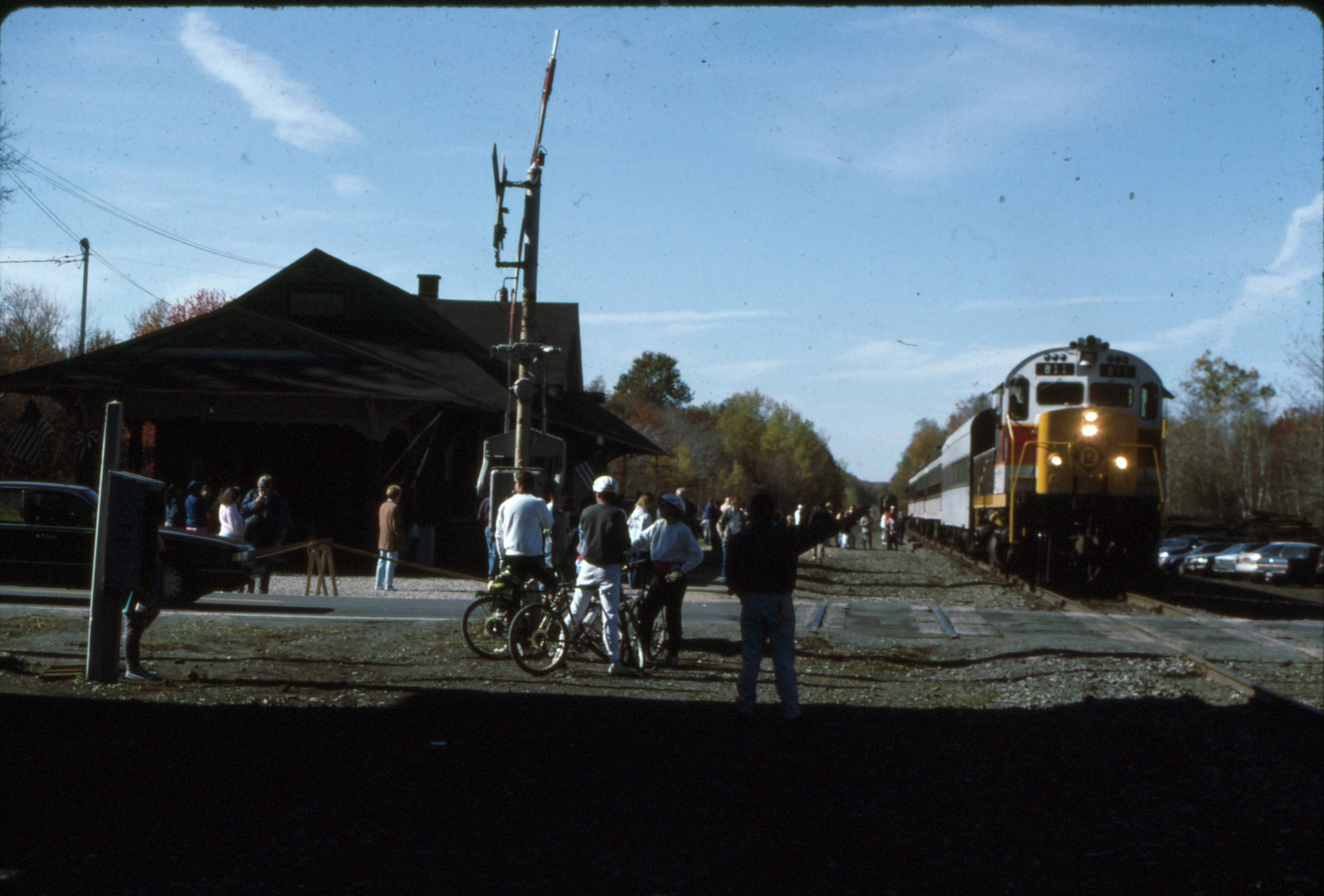
Mount Pocono Station, in 1991

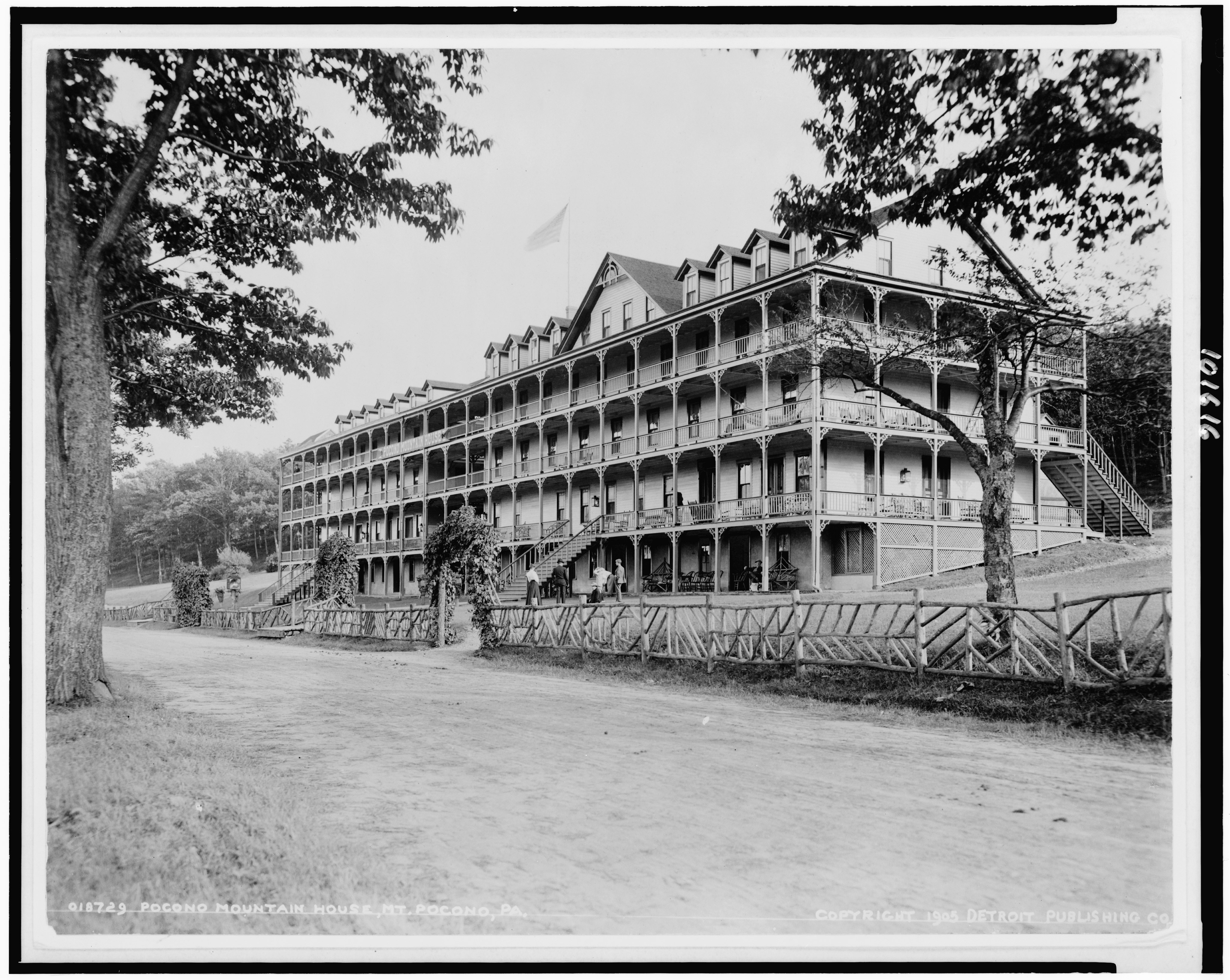
Pocono Mountain House in 1905

== Climate ==
According to the Trewartha climate classification system, Mount Pocono has a temperate Continental climate (Dc) with warm summers (b), cold winters (o) and year-around precipitation (Dcbo). Dcbo climates are characterized by at least one month having an average mean temperature ≤ 32.0 °F (0 °C), four to seven months with an average mean temperature ≥ 50.0 °F (10 °C), all months with an average mean temperature < 72.0 °F (22 °C) and no significant precipitation difference between seasons. Although most summer days are comfortably humid in Mount Pocono, episodes of heat and high humidity can occur, with heat index values > 93 °F (34 °C). Since 1981, the highest air temperature has been 94.0 °F (34 °C) on July 22, 2011, and the highest daily average mean dew point has been 70.7 °F (22 °C), on August 1, 2006. July is the peak month for thunderstorm activity, which correlates with the average warmest month of the year. The average wettest month is October, with added rainfall from tropical storm remnants during the Atlantic hurricane season. Since 1981, the wettest calendar day has been 6.81 inches (173 mm), on September 30, 2010. During the winter months, the plant hardiness zone is 5b, with an average annual extreme minimum air temperature of −10.1 °F (−23 °C). Since 1981, the coldest air temperature has been −21.6 °F (−30 °C), on January 21, 1994. Episodes of extreme cold and wind can occur, with wind chill values < −22 °F (−30 °C). The average snowiest month is January which correlates with the average coldest month of the year. Ice storms and large snowstorms depositing ≥ 12 inches (30 cm) of snow occur nearly every year, particularly during nor'easters from December through March.

Climate data for Mount Pocono, Pennsylvania (Pocono Mountains Municipal Airport), 1991–2020 normals, extremes 1901–present
Month	Jan	Feb	Mar	Apr	May	Jun	Jul	Aug	Sep	Oct	Nov	Dec	Year
Record high °F (°C)	69 (21)	70 (21)	81 (27)	88 (31)	94 (34)	92 (33)	103 (39)	95 (35)	95 (35)	89 (32)	77 (25)	67 (19)	103 (39)
Mean maximum °F (°C)	54.3 (12.4)	53.2 (11.8)	62.7 (17.1)	76.9 (24.9)	83.2 (28.4)	85.7 (29.8)	87.9 (31.1)	85.9 (29.9)	83.1 (28.4)	74.7 (23.7)	65.1 (18.4)	55.6 (13.1)	89.2 (31.8)
Mean daily maximum °F (°C)	30.2 (−1.0)	33.4 (0.8)	41.4 (5.2)	54.6 (12.6)	65.3 (18.5)	73.0 (22.8)	77.7 (25.4)	75.7 (24.3)	68.5 (20.3)	57.1 (13.9)	45.7 (7.6)	34.9 (1.6)	54.8 (12.7)
Daily mean °F (°C)	22.6 (−5.2)	25.2 (−3.8)	32.7 (0.4)	44.4 (6.9)	55.0 (12.8)	63.2 (17.3)	67.9 (19.9)	66.0 (18.9)	59.0 (15.0)	48.0 (8.9)	37.8 (3.2)	28.1 (−2.2)	45.8 (7.7)
Mean daily minimum °F (°C)	15.1 (−9.4)	16.9 (−8.4)	24.0 (−4.4)	34.3 (1.3)	44.6 (7.0)	53.4 (11.9)	58.1 (14.5)	56.3 (13.5)	49.6 (9.8)	38.9 (3.8)	29.8 (−1.2)	21.3 (−5.9)	36.9 (2.7)
Mean minimum °F (°C)	−3.5 (−19.7)	−0.1 (−17.8)	6.1 (−14.4)	21.3 (−5.9)	30.9 (−0.6)	39.0 (3.9)	46.8 (8.2)	45.4 (7.4)	35.5 (1.9)	25.7 (−3.5)	14.0 (−10.0)	3.9 (−15.6)	−5.6 (−20.9)
Record low °F (°C)	−35 (−37)	−25 (−32)	−14 (−26)	0 (−18)	18 (−8)	25 (−4)	34 (1)	31 (−1)	22 (−6)	12 (−11)	−2 (−19)	−22 (−30)	−35 (−37)
Average precipitation inches (mm)	2.98 (76)	2.45 (62)	3.83 (97)	4.24 (108)	4.06 (103)	4.69 (119)	4.73 (120)	4.64 (118)	5.59 (142)	5.15 (131)	4.08 (104)	3.78 (96)	50.22 (1,276)
Average precipitation days (≥ 0.01 in)	11.4	11.6	12.9	13.9	15.6	15.2	15.1	15.1	13.4	13.4	11.4	12.3	161.3
Source: NOAA

== Ecology ==
According to the A. W. Kuchler U.S. potential natural vegetation types, Mount Pocono would have a dominant vegetation type of Northern Hardwood (106) with a dominant vegetation form of Northern hardwood forest (26). The peak spring bloom typically occurs in early-May and peak fall color usually occurs in early-October. The plant hardiness zone is 5b, with an average annual extreme minimum air temperature of −10.1 °F (−23 °C).

== See also ==
- Casino Theatre (Mount Pocono, Pennsylvania)
