= Puryear =

Puryear may refer to:

== People ==
- Bennet Puryear Jr. (1884–1982), United States Marine Corps major general
- Chad Puryear, American teacher and politician
- Eugene Puryear (born 1986), American activist and politician
- Martin Puryear (born 1941), American sculptor
- Pauline Sims Puryear (1900—1971), American social worker and clubwoman
- Richard Puryear (died 1894), African American lynching victim
- Richard Clauselle Puryear (1801–1867), American politician
- Joe Puryear (1973–2010), American mountain climber

== Places ==
- Puryear, Tennessee, United States, a city
- Mordecai Puryear House, a center-hall house in Franklin, Tennessee, United States
