= Kitson Woolen Mill =

- U.S. National Register of Historic Places
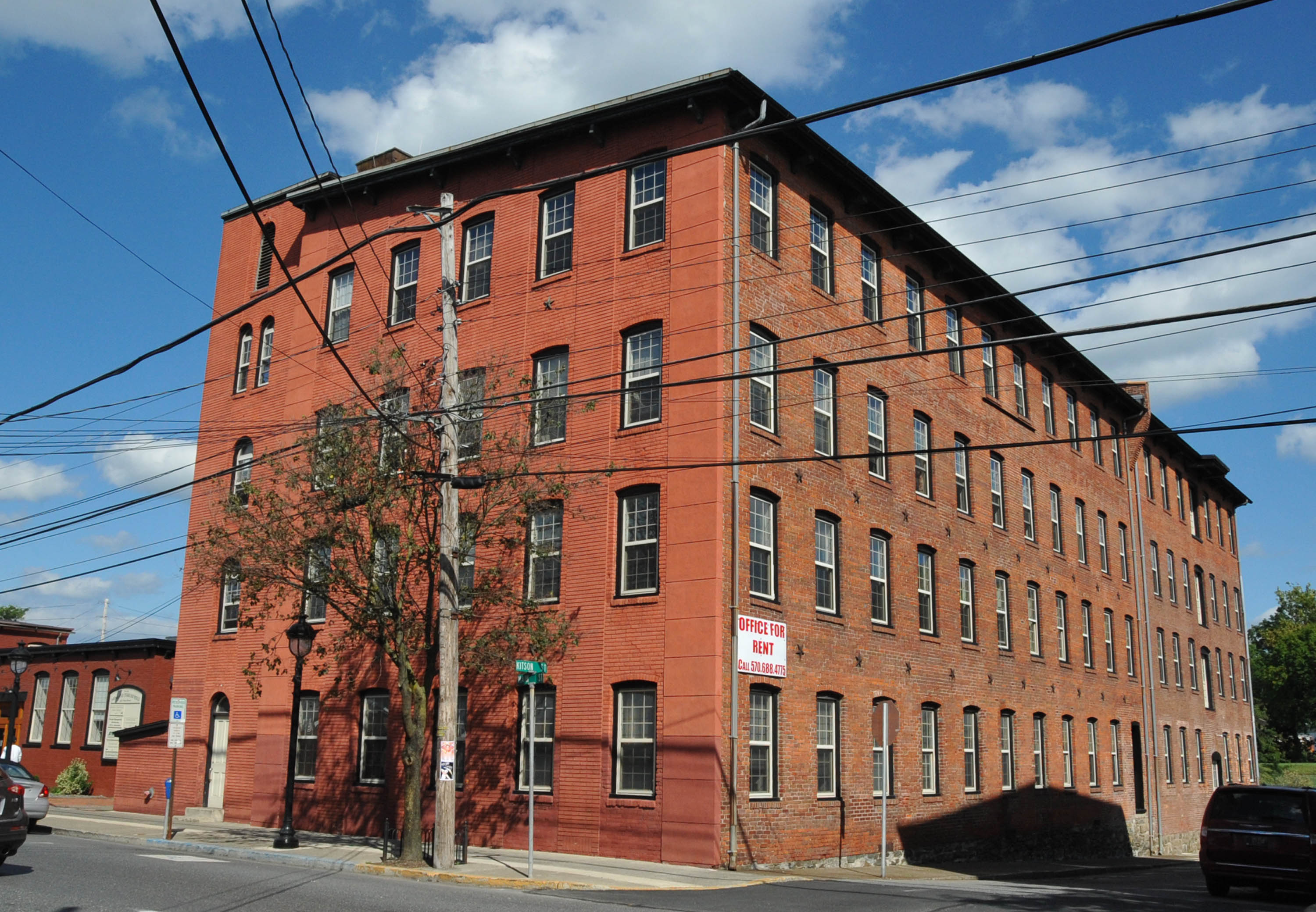

- Location within Pennsylvania Location within the United States
- Location: 411 Main St., Stroudsburg, Pennsylvania
- Coordinates: 40°59′13″N 75°11′23″W
- Area: 3.1 acres (1.3 ha)
- Built: 1893-1904
- Built by: Phillips, M.L.
- NRHP reference No.: 84003501
- Added to NRHP: January 12, 1984

Kitson Woolen Mill, also known as the Holland Thread Company building, is a historic woolen mill complex located at Stroudsburg, Monroe County, Pennsylvania. The complex consists of four brick buildings built between 1893 and 1904. They are arranged in a "U"-shape and consist of the "East Wing," "West Wing," boiler house, and office. The Kitson Woolen Mill was in operation until 1928, after which the mill was occupied by the Holland Thread Company until 1978.

It was added to the National Register of Historic Places in 1984.

== History ==
Jacob Stroud's grist mill was located on or near the site by McMichael's Creek in the late 18th century. In 1865 "Stroudsburg Mills" was established on the site with a new building to weave wool. It closed in 1873. It is not clear whether any of the earlier buildings were incorporated into the current buildings.

Thomas Kitson (1840-1900) worked in woolen mills from an early age in his native England, and immigrated to the United States at age 19, where he worked at a Catskills mill in New York. In partnership with William Wallace he re-established the mill in 1873 on lower Main Street in Stroudsburg. Within ten years Kitson became the sole owner and the mill increased from 13 employees to 115 employees with an annual profit of $400,000. By 1886 the mill produced 14,000 yards of 54 inch wide wool cloth per month that was sold in New York City.

The mill was originally run by water power and the mill race is located under the mill. Partial steam power was added in 1888 and full steam power in 1893. New construction nearly doubled the size of the mill in 1898.

Kitson and the mill are known for setting an unusual world record on May 18, 1898, the shortest time to make a suit of clothes starting from un-sheared sheep. The previous world record was an even 8 hours, set by a Scottish mill. At 6:30 a.m. 6 sheep were brought in to be sheared by six employees. A total of 18 workers sorted, cleaned, dyed, dried, and carded the wool, then spun it into yarn. Cloth, in a black and white checkered pattern, was then woven from the yarn.

The next step in the process was to have the cloth made into a suit. Jacob Marks, a Stroudsburg tailor, sewed the suit in 2½ hours with the help of five assistants. The suit was delivered to Kitson's house in a total of 6 hours and 4 minutes. He then wore the suit to a party at the Washington Hotel, with the participating workers and prominent local businessmen joining in. Lamb was served for dinner.

After Kitson died in 1900, his son, Thomas J. Kitson, took over the business until 1920 when he died. The mill was sold at a Sheriff's sale in January 1930 and stood vacant for a few years. In 1933 the Holland Thread Company acquired the building and operated in it until 1978.
