= Pocono Creek =

River in Pennsylvania, United States

Coordinates: 40.98119°N 75.19703°W

Pocono Creek is a 15.8-mile-long (25.4 km) tributary of Brodhead Creek in the Pocono Mountains in Northeastern Pennsylvania.

Pocono Creek joins Brodhead Creek in Stroudsburg.

Pocono is a Native American name purported to mean "a stream between two mountains".

== See also ==
- List of rivers of Pennsylvania
