= Stroud Mall =

- Location: Stroudsburg, Pennsylvania
- Coordinates: 40.9899°N 75.2240°W
- Opened: 1978
- Developer: Hess's and the Montgomery Development Company
- Owner: CBL & Associates Properties
- Num. of stores: 54
- Num. of anchor tenants: 3
- Floor area: 419,059 sq ft (38,931.9 m^{2})
- Floors: 1
- Parking: 2,100 spaces, parking lot and 2 parking garages
- Public transit: MCTA bus: 101, 203
- Website: https://www.stroud-mall.com/

Stroud Mall is a shopping mall located in Stroudsburg, Pennsylvania. It is located in the Poconos region of Pennsylvania, just a few minutes from the New Jersey border adjacent to Pennsylvania Route 611 and Interstate 80 exit 305. It is anchored by JCPenney, ShopRite, and EFO Furniture Outlet.

== History ==
The mall was first announced in May 1976, to be development by a joint effort of Hess's and the Montgomery Development Company of Plymouth Meeting, Pennsylvania. The mall would feature Hess's and another unnamed department store as anchors, with 40 smaller stores and a twin-screen cinema, with Hess's set to open before the rest of the mall. By October 1976, several tenants had already signed onto the mall including Endicott Johnson, DEB Shops, Kay Jewelers, Piercing Pagoda, Kinney Shoes, and B. Dalton Booksellers. JCPenney would be announced as the likely second anchor in early 1977, and the mall would continue signing more stores through this time, including Waldenbooks, Thom McAn, Foxmoor Casuals, and Stewart's. Hess's would hold its grand opening on July 29, 1977, followed by the mall itself on March 2, 1978. JCPenney, which had officially signed a lease in September 1977, would open later in 1978.

Sears would join the mall with its grand opening on August 3, 1994, as part of $12 million expansion project. The store, like JCPenney, would replace a location in downtown Stroudsburg. The Sears move had been announced as early as 1990 but did not occur until 1994. It was the only two-story anchor in the mall, and featured what at the time was the first escalator to be located in Monroe County. The novelty of the escalator caused quite a stir in local media, and as part of the festivities Sears had reigning Miss Pennsylvania Kirstin Deliz Border on hand for the occasion.

The Bon-Ton would take over Hess's at the mall in 1994, as part of the 20 stores they purchased during the chain's break up. The mall would receive another renovation in 2002.

The then 7-screen Loews theater would close in December 2010, and would reopen as a 12-screen Cinemark theater in November 2011. The Bon-Ton closed all stores, including the Stroud Mall location, in 2018. On November 8, 2018, it was announced the Sears store at Stroud Mall would close by February 2019 as part of a plan to close 40 stores nationwide. ShopRite moved into the mall in November 2019 in the former space of The Bon-Ton, replacing the store in downtown Stroudsburg. EFO Furniture Outlet has opened a store in the mall on January 24, 2020, replacing the first floor of Sears.

== See also ==
- List of shopping malls in Pennsylvania
