= Casino Theatre (Mount Pocono, Pennsylvania) =

Movie house and ice cream shop in Pennsylvania, US

Coordinates: 41.1210°N 75.3555°W

Casino Theatre Entertainment Center, Mount Pocono, Pennsylvania

One of the twin movie theaters at Casino Theatre Entertainment Center, Mount Pocono, Pennsylvania

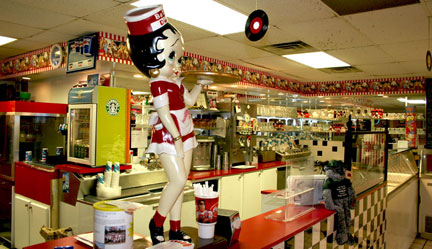
Village Malt Shoppe at Casino Theatre Entertainment Center

Village Malt Shoppe

Village Malt Shoppe

Village Malt Shoppe

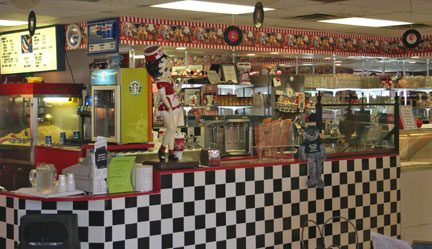
Village Malt Shoppe

The Casino Theatre Entertainment Center was a two-screen movie house and ice cream shop in Mount Pocono, Pennsylvania. This year-round family-owned and operated business, founded in 1975, was built on the site of the Casino dance hall and night club, which was itself established in 1922.

In addition to first-run movies, the Casino housed the Village Malt Shoppe, which features an old-fashioned soda fountain offering ice cream soda, malted milk, milkshake, egg cream and phosphates, as well as a large selection of ice cream flavors.

There was also a redemption game room geared toward younger children, and an 18-hole miniature golf course.

In 2022, following the sale of the Theatre from the family owning it since its opening in 1975 reports emerged that the theatre would be converted into a Vietnamese restaurant by its new owners.

== History ==
The "Casino" name predates the existing Casino Theatre building and business, and goes back to a landmark dance hall built on the same spot in Mount Pocono, Pennsylvania. Several decades later the building was transformed into a movie house, with seats placed on the flat dance floor and the screen on the stage. The "Casino Theatre," complete with British spelling of "theater," was born.

The original one-story 1922 Casino building, originally used as a dance hall and night club, was converted to a movie theater after being purchased by Mrs. H.C. Smith of Stroudsburg.

The theater building was purchased in 1974 by three local couples: George & Sheila Litz of Cresco, and two couples from Pocono Farms, Victor & Diane Genco and John & Ruth Hildebrand. The three families formed a business entity called LIGEND, Inc., from the letters of their last names, and incorporated it with the Commonwealth of Pennsylvania on March 12, 1975.

The families renovated and modernized the vintage structure, opening for business on April 4, 1975, with the addition of an old-fashioned ice cream parlor called the Village Malt Shoppe, with 20 flavors of ice cream. The new decor featured paneling with an old-fashioned newspaper design, along with crisp white curtains and Tiffany-style lamps. The building was also home to two other LIGEND businesses: the Needles N' Things sewing and craft shop and the Early American Gift Shop.

The single 200-seat Casino movie theater reopened that May with a showing of the classic Gone With the Wind.

Less than a year after the grand reopening, disaster struck. On March 11, 1976, the renovated Casino Theatre and neighboring businesses burned to the ground. Operated as a summer business, the movie theater and malt shop were closed for the season at the time. The building had been broken into several times over the winter, fueling speculation about the cause of the fire.

The Casino had been scheduled to open on April 26 with the movie musical 1776 in honor of the United States Bicentennial, and the local bicentennial committee had been planning to sell tickets to the show to raise money for a Fourth of July parade.

Two hours after the first firefighters arrived at the scene, only the brick facade of the old wooden building remained.

The new building opened just four months later, in July 1976, with a new single-screen movie theater and new ice cream parlor. The silver lining of the fire was that the resulting destruction of the original building meant that the new building was built with a slanted floor, allowing a modern movie-going experience instead of the neck-craning involved when watching a film from the flat floor of the old dance hall.

Within just a few years, the Litzes bought out their partners and began expanding the operation. Today, after more than 30 years, the business is still owned and operated by the Litz family, and the Casino is in its second generation of family management. (With the third generation often employed there.)

Over the years, the Litzes added a kitchen, miniature golf course and a game room targeted at pre-teens and younger, with prize redemptions. The 1950s theme of the decor dates to 2004, when a gift shop featuring nostalgia and retro items was added. Items featuring Betty Boop, Elvis Presley, Marilyn Monroe, James Dean, I Love Lucy, and other icons of the 1950s.

For years, the Casino ran second-run movies or classics, permitting the theater to show a greater range of films by showing them for shorter periods of time, as makes sense for a business with a relatively small customer base. But as the population of The Poconos has grown, so has the Casino: The theater was twinned in 2003, when the Casino also started running first-run movies.

The business continues to grow. For years, the Casino was a seasonal business, open for weekends only from mid-March through Memorial Day, then running full-time through the end of September, when it would revert to weekends only through Thanksgiving.

In 2007, the Casino became a year-round operation. With a movie theater, malt shop, sandwich restaurant, children's arcade room, gift shop and miniature golf operation all under one roof, the owners are recasting the business as the Casino Theatre Entertainment Center.

In 2021, the Casino was sold to Steve Tran, a local businessman to allow the then operators of the Casino to retire. Initial reports indicated that Tran intended to keep on the staff with the only noted changes in local papers being the possible addition of Vietnamese food to the menu.

In May 2022, following an extended period of closure since the sale, a local Mount Pocono newspaper reported that the Casino had seen most of its interior removed and replaced, with the owner now indicating that the Casino Theatre would be closed permanently and converted into a new Vietnamese restaurant with the new owner stating "No movies, restaurant only." Confirming the end of the nearly 47 year old business and seeming to contradict earlier statements by the old owners and operators at the time of the sale.
