= Stroud Mansion =

Historic house in Pennsylvania, United States

- U.S. National Register of Historic Places
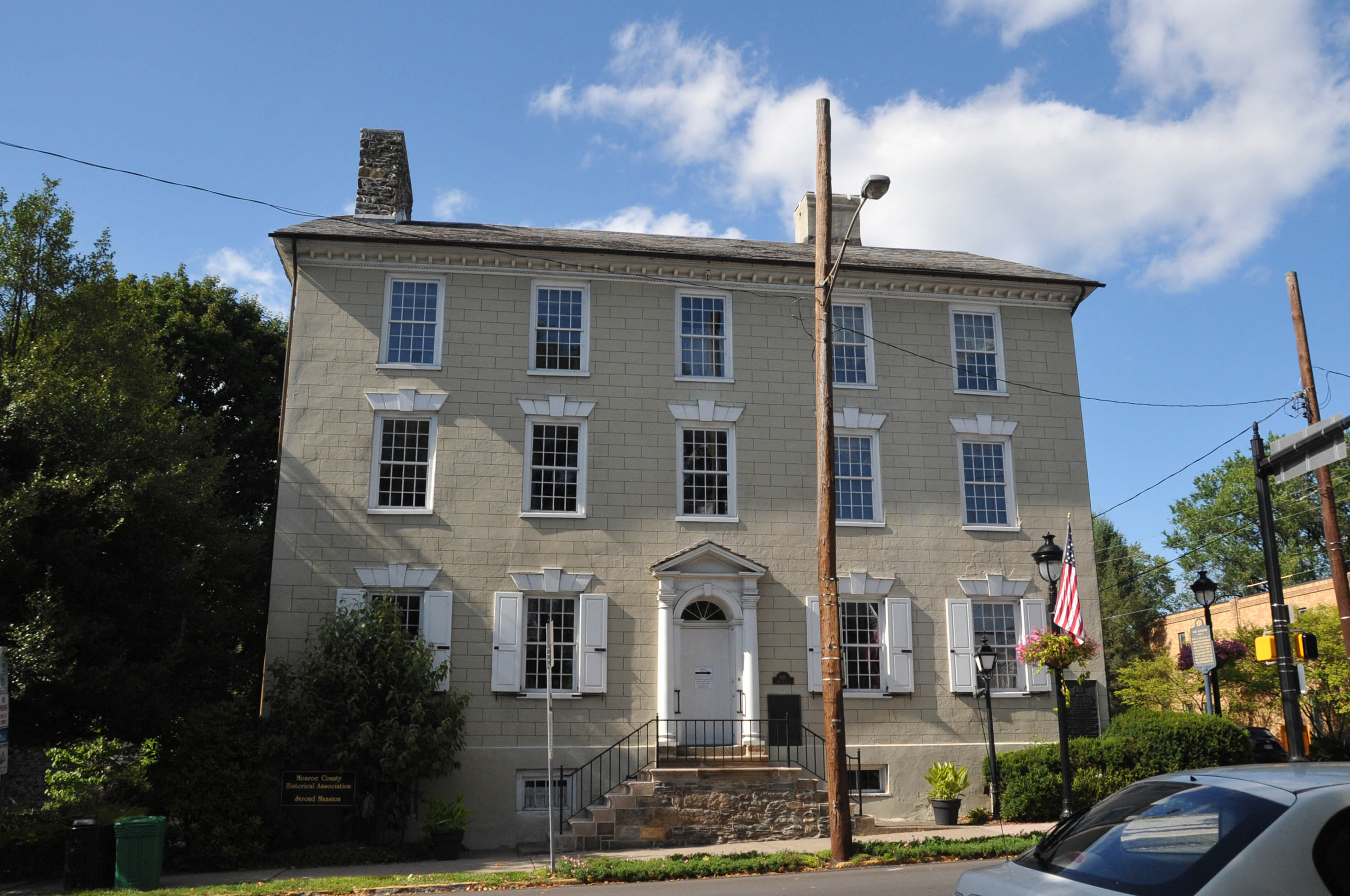

- Location within Pennsylvania Location within the United States
- Interactive map showing the location of Stroud Mansion
- Location: Main and 9th Sts., Stroudsburg, Pennsylvania
- Coordinates: 40°59′4″N 75°11′55″W
- Area: 0.8 acres (0.32 ha)
- Built: 1795
- NRHP reference No.: 79002297
- Added to NRHP: August 1, 1979

Stroud Mansion is an historic house located in Stroudsburg, Monroe County, Pennsylvania.

It was added to the National Register of Historic Places in 1979.

== History and architectural features ==
Built circa 1795, this historic structure is a 3 1/2-story building with a pedimented gable roof and a 2 1/2-story rear wing. The main section measures fifty feet by forty feet, with the rear wing measuring twenty-eight feet by twenty-four feet, four inches.

Built by Stroudsburg's founder Jacob Stroud for his son, John Stroud, it remained in the Stroud family until 1893, although it was leased for a time for use as a store and as a boarding house. It now houses the Monroe County Historical Association.
