= Monroe County Transit Authority =

Bus service in Pennsylvania, United States

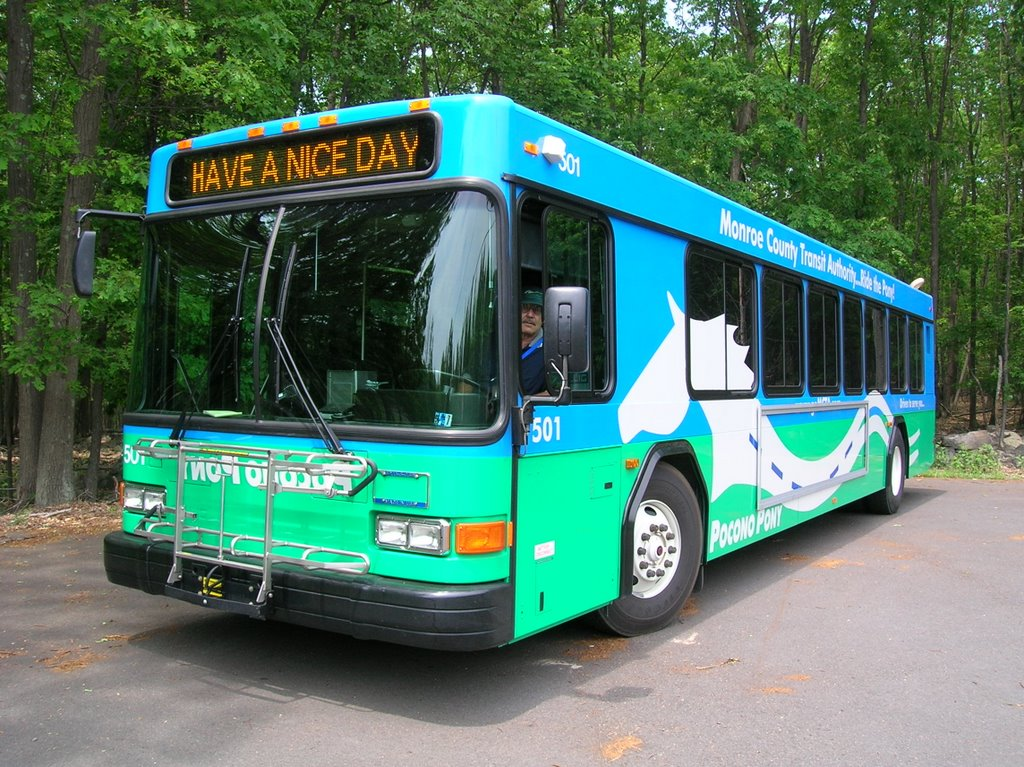
- Founded: 1979
- Headquarters: 1 MCTA Drive; Swiftwater, Pennsylvania
- Locale: Swiftwater, Pennsylvania
- Service area: Monroe County, Pennsylvania
- Service type: Bus, Paratransit
- Routes: 7( 4 local, 2 shuttles, 1 Express)
- Fleet: 14 Fixed Route, 42 Paratransit
- Daily ridership: 1,600
- Website: www.gomcta.com

The Monroe County Transit Authority (MCTA), also known as the Pocono Pony, is a public transportation service that services Monroe County, Pennsylvania. It provides rural and inter-city fixed route bus and paratransit service within the county. MCTA is funded in part by PennDOT, the Federal Transit Administration, local match and farebox revenue.

In 2023, East Stroudsburg was un-designated a metropolitan statistical area and became a micropolitan statistical area. Monroe County Transit Authority is now considered a rural transit system by the Federal Transit Administration.

MCTA had over 297,727 riders in FY2024 on both the fixed route bus and paratransit programs.

== Fixed route service ==
MCTA provides fixed route service along Monroe County's primary roadways. Service is generally hourly during weekdays, varied on Saturday in East Stroudsburg, Stroudsburg, Stroud Township, Bartonsville, Tannersville, Mt. Pocono and Coolbaugh Township. The Red Route provides service to East Stroudsburg University, St. Luke's University Health Network and Lehigh Valley Hospital-Pocono. The Blue Route has service to Northampton Community College, Monroe Campus, the Pocono Premium Outlets in Tannersville, Mt. Pocono and Coolbaugh Township. There is no service on Sunday.

In 2013, MCTA launched a Live Bus View for patrons to view the actual location of the buses. In November 2013, MCTA will be launching a new fare system that will use state of the art contactless fare cards. The new fare cards will be called "MoGo" as in "Miles to Go." Miles is the official mascot of the Monroe County Transit Authority.

In 2014, the Blue bus was extended to go into the new Northampton Community College campus. As the rural area developed a new resort opened up called Kalahari Resort this caused them to bring at least two new bus route, the silver and purple. The silver bus ran as an extension of a blue bus to Kalahari Resort, following the Blue bus on Route 196 and on Route 940. The purple was a trial route that ran from Martz Bus Terminal in Mount Pocono all the way to the Pocono Mountain Library in Tobyhanna. Sadly, still no Saturday service for these new routes.

When the bridge construction in Stroudsburg on Bridge came on June 16, 2016, this caused the buses to create a drastic change due to the heavy traffic conditions on the bus routes. The buses but Orange all run on a reduced route and the silver was made a loop, the purple was cancelled due to reduced ridership. Another bus route had also been able to help feed the commuters in the local area called the Stroudsburg Circular to help people travel through the various areas in East Stroudsburg area via Main Street and Watergate Apartments area. As this happens the system is still trying to work out the bus routing and patterns.

MCTA operates the following routes:

Route	Line Name	Terminals		Places Served	Notes
101	Red Route	St. Luke's Hospital	Eagles Glen/Big Lots	Stroudsburg Weis, Stroud Mall, Stroudsburg, Stroudsburg ShopRite, East Stroudsburg, East Stroudsburg Walmart, Lehigh Valley Hospital-Pocono, East Stroudsburg University	operates Monday-Saturday
102	Blue Route	St. Luke's Hospital	Mountain Center	Giant, Tannersville, Tannersville Weis, Northampton Community College Monroe Campus, Pocono Premium Outlets, Mount Airy Casino Resort, Mt. Pocono, Mt. Pocono Walmart, Mt. Pocono Plaza	operates Monday-Saturday
103	Silver Route	Kalahari	A Pocono Country Place	Mt. Pocono, Mt. Pocono Walmart, Mt. Pocono Plaza	operates Monday-Saturday
204	Green Route	Great Wolf Lodge	Stroud Mall	Pocono, Tannersville, Bartsonville, Stroud	operates Monday-Saturday
402	Eastburg Express	A Pocono Country Place	St. Luke's Hospital	Mt. Pocono Walmart, Sanofi Pasteur, Pocono Premium Outlets, Northampton Community College Monroe Campus, Tannersville Weis, Giant	operates Monday-Friday, single morning trip from A Pocono Country Place to St. Luke's Hospital, continued service to Stroudsburg and East Stroudsburg via Route 101

The Monroe County Transit Authority schedule can be found via Google Transit.

== Shared ride service ==
Curb to curb paratransit service is available at a discounted cost to eligible populations. Examples of eligible groups are senior citizens, 65 years or older, persons with disabilities and Medical Assistance Transportation Program participants.

== Flex routes ==
The Orange, Violet, and Yellow Flex routes provide service in the more rural parts of Monroe County.

== Delaware Water Gap National Recreation Area Transit in the Park ==
MCTA, with funding from a Transit in the Park pilot grant from DEWA, began providing summer weekend service to areas within the park. In 2013, MCTA is providing free weekend service between Memorial Day Weekend through Labor Day Weekend to Delaware Water Gap borough, Shawnee Inn, Smithfield Beach, Fernwood Resort, Bushkill Boat Launch and Dingmans Boat Launch.
