= Pocono Mountains Regional Airport =

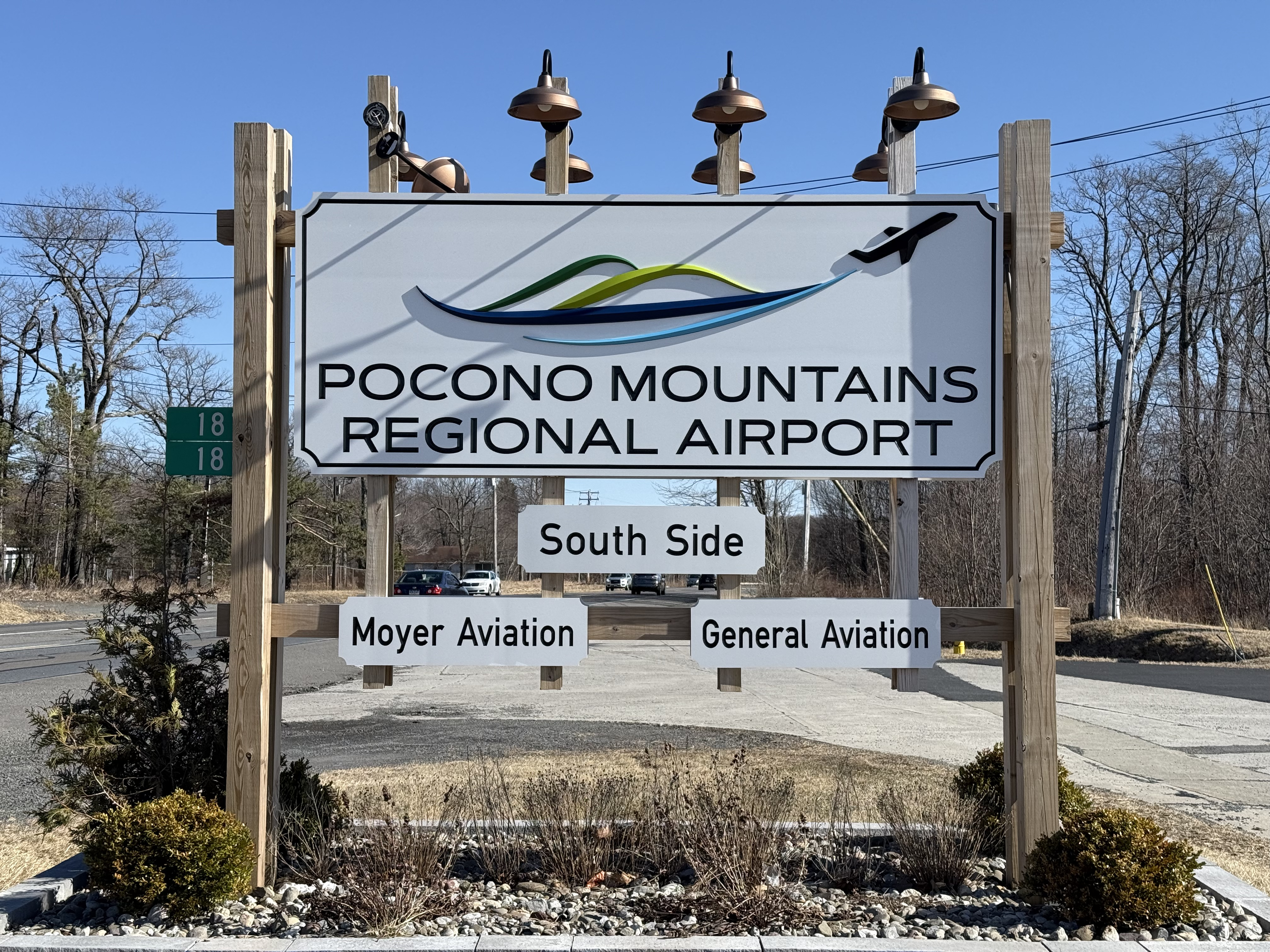
- IATA: MPO; ICAO: KMPO; FAA LID: MPO

Summary
- Airport type: Public
- Owner: Pocono Mountains Regional Airport Authority
- Serves: Mount Pocono, Pennsylvania
- Location: Coolbaugh Township, Monroe County, Pennsylvania
- Elevation AMSL: 1,915 ft / 584 m
- Coordinates: 41°08′16″N 075°22′48″W
- Website: www.MPOairport.com

Map
- Location of airport in Pennsylvania MPO (the United States)

Runways
Direction	Length		Surface
Direction	ft	m	Surface
5/23	4,000	1,219	Asphalt
13/31	5,001	1,524	Asphalt

Statistics (2011)
- Aircraft operations: 19,850
- Based aircraft: 19
- Source: Federal Aviation Administration

Pocono Mountains Regional Airport (IATA: MPO, ICAO: KMPO, FAA LID: MPO) is a public airport two miles northwest of Mount Pocono, in Coolbaugh Township, Monroe County, Pennsylvania. It is owned by the Pocono Mountains Regional Airport Authority. The National Plan of Integrated Airport Systems for 2011–2015 categorized it as a general aviation facility.

== Facilities ==
The airport covers 275 acres (111 ha) at an elevation of 1,915 feet (584 m). It has two asphalt runways: 5/23 is 4,000 by 100 feet (1,219 x 30 m) and 13/31 is 5,001 by 75 feet (1,524 x 23 m).

In the year ending August 31, 2011 the airport had 19,850 aircraft operations, average 54 per day: 98.5% general aviation and 1.5% military. 19 aircraft were then based at the airport: 79% single-engine, 10.5% multi-engine, and 10.5% helicopter.

== See also ==
- List of airports in Pennsylvania
