= Academy Hill Historic District (Andover, Massachusetts) =

Historic district in Massachusetts, United States

- U.S. National Register of Historic Places
- U.S. Historic district
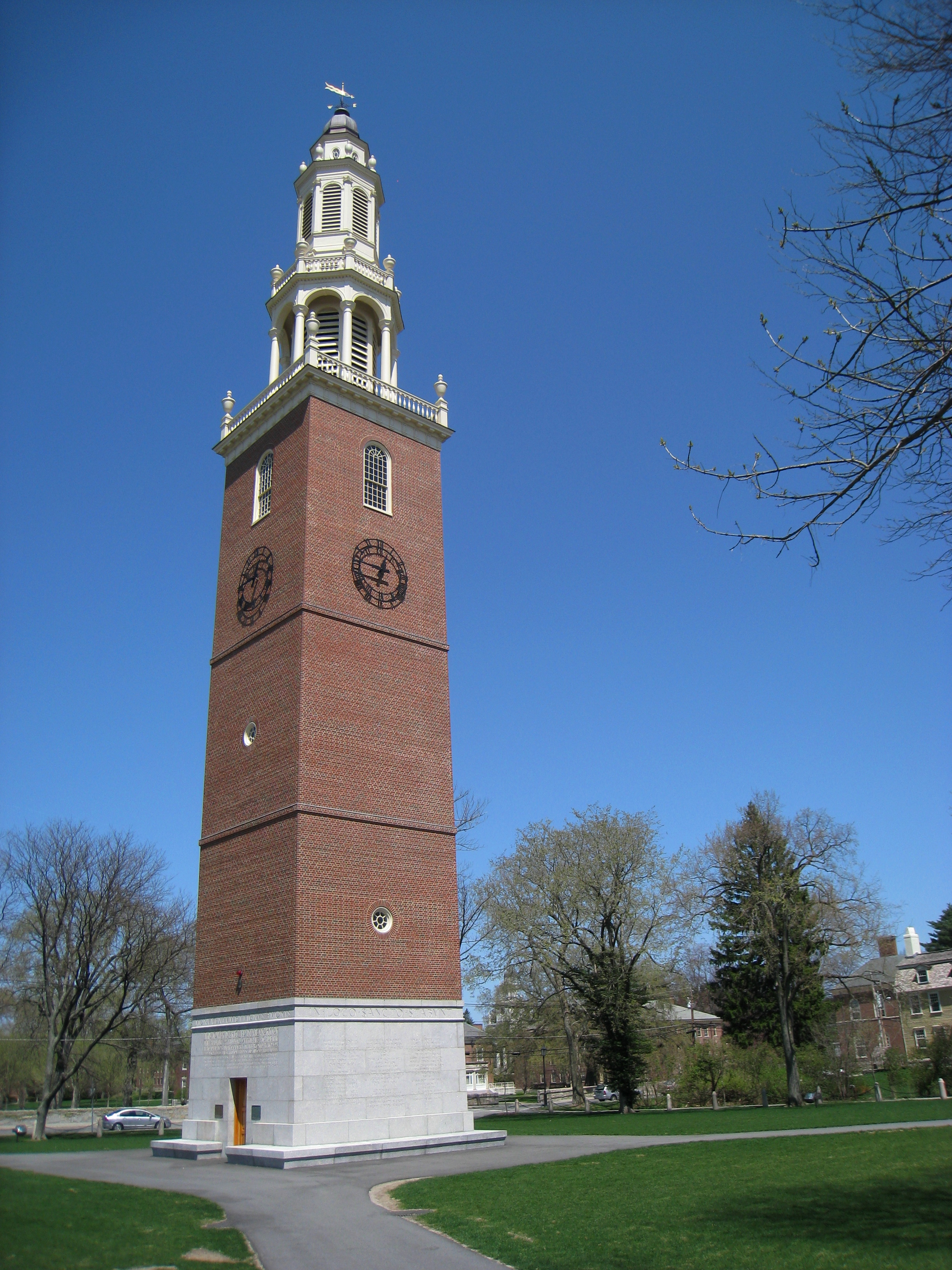
- Phillips Academy; Memorial Bell Tower

- Location within Massachusetts Location within the United States
- Location: Andover, Massachusetts
- Coordinates: 42°38′48″N 71°8′7″W
- Built: 1780
- Architect: Multiple
- Architectural style: Mid 19th Century Revival, Other, Federal
- MPS: Town of Andover MRA
- NRHP reference No.: 82000475
- Added to NRHP: October 7, 1982

The Academy Hill Historic District is a historic district on Massachusetts Route 28 in Andover, Massachusetts. It encompasses the historic campuses of three important 18th and 19th century academic institutions, which shaped not only town but the nation's educational systems.

The first school established in Andover was the Phillips Academy, established in 1778. Its campus includes a number of notable buildings, from two important building phases. The first, between about 1810 and 1830, resulted in the construction of Bulfinch Hall (1819, named for, but not designed by, Charles Bulfinch), Samaritan Hall (1824, at first an infirmary, but later used for other purposes), and the Stowe House (1828, remodeled by Harriet Beecher Stowe in the 1850s, and later used as an inn). The second building phase was in the early decades of the 20th century, when Bell Tower, Morse Hall, and Addison Gallery were built.

The campus of the Andover Theological Seminary (founded 1807) includes the oldest building in the district, Foxcroft Hall, which was built in 1808. Along with Pearson Hall (1818) and Bartlet Hall (1820), it is a fine example of Federalist academic architecture. The latter two buildings underwent some changes, most notably being reduced from four to three stories to better fit the scale of the campus, in the 20th century. The campus also includes the 1809 Phelps House, which housed the first president of the academy, and later Professor Austin Phelps.

The third school in the district is the Abbot Academy, which was founded in 1828 as a women's school. It merged with the Phillips Academy in 1973, but its former central campus retains definition, with three buildings surrounding the "Abbot Circle": Abbot Hall, the original academy building (1829), Draper Hall, a dormitory (1890), and McKeen Hall.

The district was added to the National Register of Historic Places in 1982.

== See also ==
- National Register of Historic Places listings in Andover, Massachusetts
- National Register of Historic Places listings in Essex County, Massachusetts
- Phillips Academy
