= Academy Hill Historic District (Stroudsburg, Pennsylvania) =

Historic district in Pennsylvania, United States

- U.S. National Register of Historic Places
- U.S. Historic district
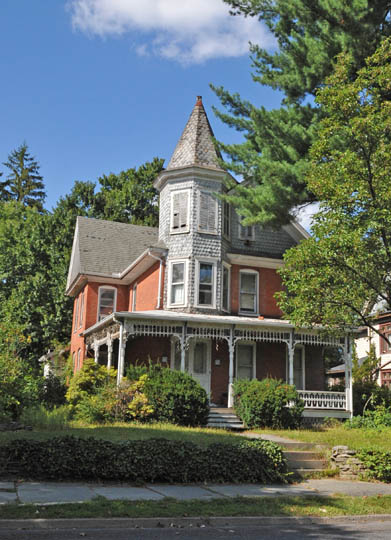

- Location within Pennsylvania Location within the United States
- Interactive map showing the location of Academy Hill Historic District
- Location: Roughly bounded by Sarah, 8th, Fulmer and 5th Sts., Stroudsburg, Pennsylvania
- Coordinates: 40°59′19″N 75°11′42″W
- Area: 42 acres (17 ha)
- Architectural style: Colonial Revival, Bungalow/craftsman, Queen Anne, North Cat, Gavel End Bungalow, Northern Removed Colonial, West Gate Bungalow
- NRHP reference No.: 89002258
- Added to NRHP: January 4, 1990

Academy Hill Historic District is a national historic district located in Stroudsburg, Monroe County, Pennsylvania. Bordered by Sarah, 8th, Fulmer, and 5th streets, the district encompasses 180 contributing buildings in a primarily residential section of Stroudsburg.

The district was added to the National Register of Historic Places in 1988.

== History and architectural features ==
The oldest community in Pennsylvania's Pocono Region, Stroudsburg was incorporated as a borough in 1815 and then designated as the county seat at the time Monroe County was created in 1836. It is also the site of multiple historic homes, the majority of which date from the mid-19th to early 20th century, and which are representative of a number of popular architectural styles of this period, including Colonial Revival, Bungalow / American Craftsman, Queen Anne, North Cat, Gavel End Bungalow, Northern Removed Colonial, and West Gate Bungalow. Eight of the buildings pre-date 1858.

=== Listing of this district on the National Register of Historic Places ===
In November 1988, Janet W. Foster, the associate director of Acroterion in Morristown, New Jersey, completed the nomination form to secure this placement of the Academy Hill Historic District on the National Register of Historic Places. The district was then officially added to the National Register later that same year.
