= Brodhead Creek =

River in the United States

Coordinates: 40°59′23″N 75°08′09″W

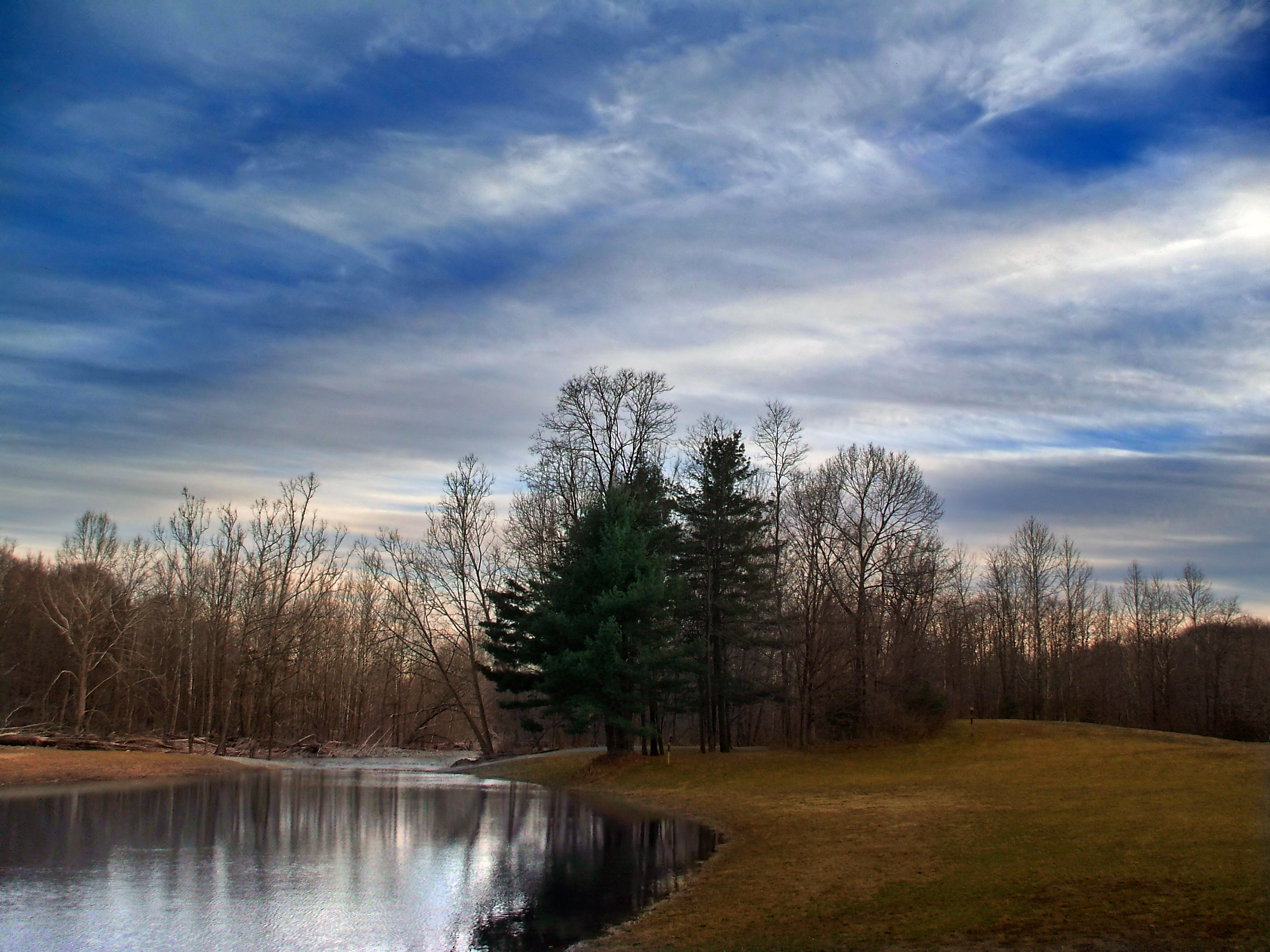
Brodhead Creek Park in Stroud Township near dusk in March 2007

Brodhead Creek is a 21.9-mile-long (35.2 km) tributary of the Delaware River in the Pocono Mountains of Monroe County in Northeastern Pennsylvania.

It is formed by the union of the Middle and Leavitt branches in Barrett Township in Monroe County. The native name was "Analomink." The present name was given for Daniel Brodhead, a prominent early settler. It receives McMichael Creek as it flows south and east into the Delaware River.

The stream flows south, separating the boroughs of Stroudsburg and East Stroudsburg. It covers a basin of 294 sq mi and its maximum discharge was 68,800 cubic feet per second, in 1955.

Brodhead Creek joins the Delaware River at the head of the Delaware Water Gap.

From 1888 to 1944, a coal gasification plant operated at the confluence of Brodhead and McMichael Creeks in Stroudsburg. The operations produced coal tar waste which contaminated the groundwater. The Environmental Protection Agency (EPA) placed the site on the Superfund National Priorities List in 1983. After cleanup, operations and monitoring activities are ongoing. The EPA removed the site from the National Priorities List in 2001.

== See also ==
- List of rivers of Pennsylvania
- List of Superfund sites in Pennsylvania
