= Stroudsburg, Pennsylvania =

Borough in Pennsylvania, US

- Borough
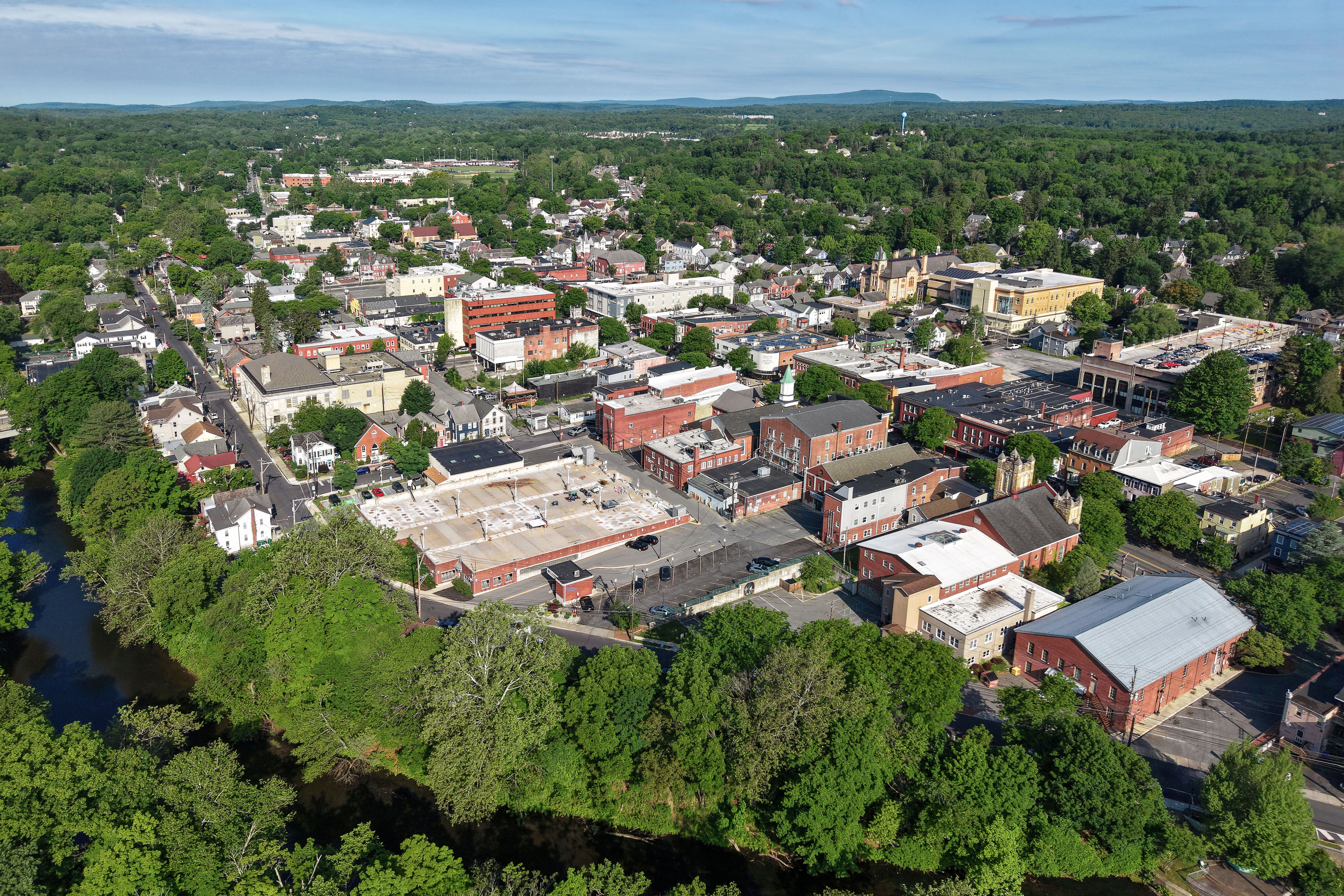
- Downtown Stroudsburg

- Seal

- Location of Stroudsburg in Monroe County, Pennsylvania

- Location of Stroudsburg in Pennsylvania Stroudsburg (the United States)
- Coordinates: 40°59′09″N 75°11′43″W
- Country: United States
- State: Pennsylvania
- County: Monroe

Government
  - Mayor: Ellen Currie (D)

Area
  - Total: 1.74 sq mi (4.51 km^{2})
  - Land: 1.73 sq mi (4.47 km^{2})
  - Water: 0.015 sq mi (0.04 km^{2})
- Elevation: 509 ft (155 m)

Population (2020)
  - Total: 5,927
  - Density: 3,436.7/sq mi (1,326.91/km^{2})
- Time zone: UTC-5 (EST)
  - Summer (DST): UTC-4 (EDT)
- ZIP Code: 18360
- Area codes: 570 and 272
- FIPS code: 42-74888
- Website: http://stroudsburgboro.com

Stroudsburg is a borough in and the county seat of Monroe County, Pennsylvania, United States. It lies within the Poconos region approximately five miles (8 km) from the Delaware Water Gap at the confluence of Brodhead Creek, McMichaels, and Pocono Creeks in Northeastern Pennsylvania. Stroudsburg is part of the East Stroudsburg Metropolitan Statistical Area, which in turn is part of the New York combined statistical area. The population was 5,927 at the 2020 census.

== History ==
=== 18th century ===
Stroudsburg was laid out by Colonel Jacob Stroud in 1799. Stroud's family founded Stroudsburg in the mid-18th century, and the town was incorporated on February 5, 1815.

=== 19th century ===
Stroudsburg was the location of the lynching of Richard Puryear in March 1894. A Black railroad worker accused of murdering a white storekeeper, Puryear was lynched by a mostly white mob after he escaped from prison. Despite a grand jury investigation, no one was charged or convicted for Puryear's murder.

=== 20th century ===
In the late 20th century, the Academy Hill Historic District, Kitson Woolen Mill, Monroe County Courthouse, and Stroud Mansion were each listed on the National Register of Historic Places.

== Geography ==
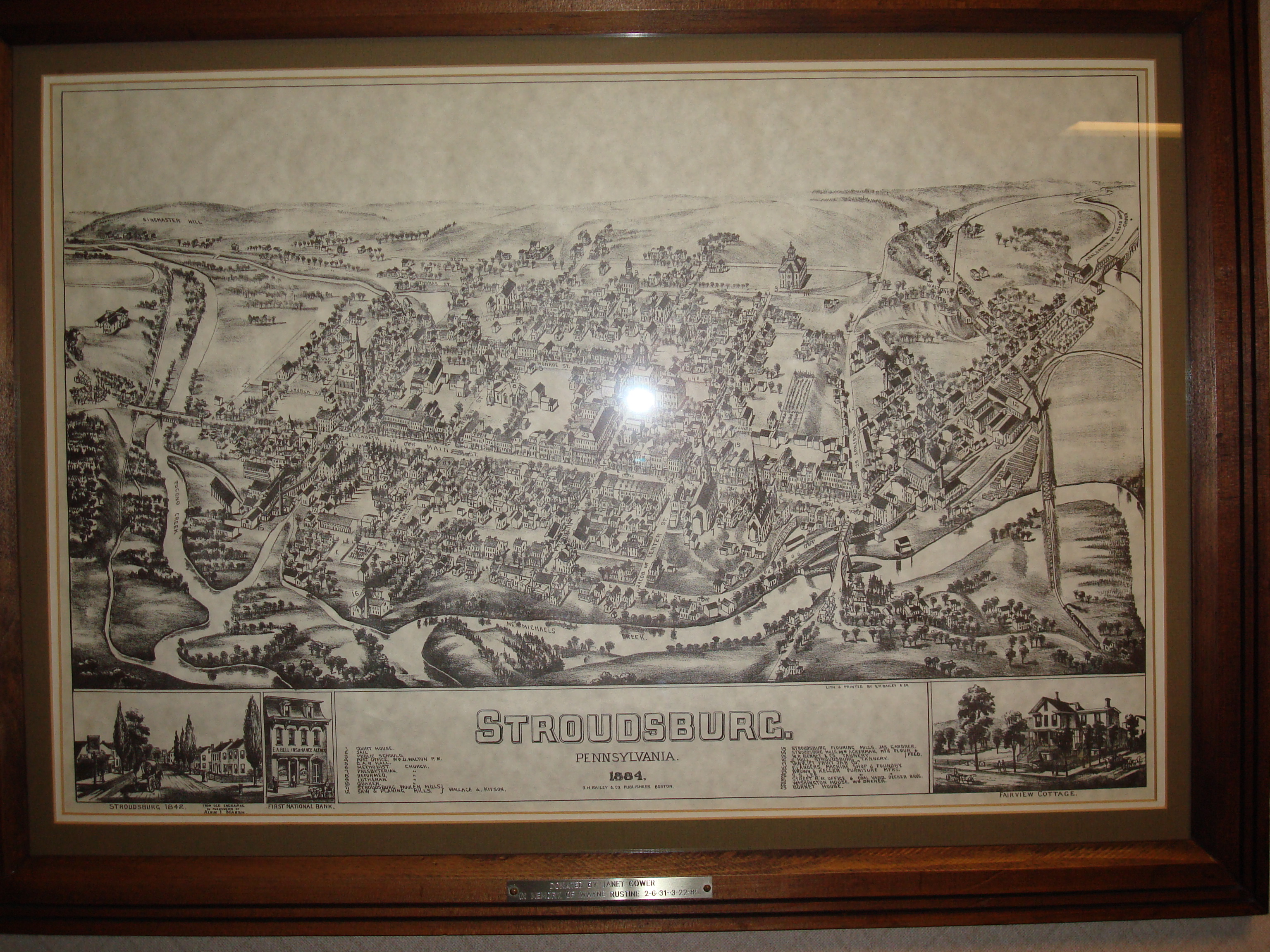
An 1894 map of Stroudsburg

Stroudsburg is located at 40°59′9″N 75°11′43″W (40.985764, -75.195352).

According to the U.S. Census Bureau, the borough has a total area of 1.8 square miles (4.7 km^{2}), of which 1.8 square miles (4.6 km^{2}) is land and 0.04 square mile (0.1 km^{2}) (1.67%) is water.

Stroudsburg is located 38 miles (61 km) north of Allentown and 53 miles (85 km) southeast of Scranton. Stroudsburg's elevation is 500 feet (150 m) above sea level.

Stroudsburg is located in the heart of the Pocono Mountains and serves as the Monroe County seat.

=== Downtown ===
Downtown Stroudsburg is the commercial hub for the surrounding area, serving as the Monroe County seat, and is located just off Interstate 80. It is the only traditional downtown in the area. Downtown Stroudsburg is home to more than 24 restaurants, nine art galleries, three women's clothing stores, numerous antique stores, several general merchandisers, many specialty shops, two hotels, the local YMCA, 11 financial institutions and the core of the legal profession in Monroe County. There are 600 hotel rooms within 2 miles (3.2 km) of Downtown Stroudsburg. Downtown Stroudsburg also features a wide tree lined Main Street with historically rich architecture, plenty of on street parking, several municipal parking lots, one parking garage and another on the drawing board. Currently the total trade area population is about 250,000. This includes all of Monroe and Pike Counties, as well as northern Northampton County and Warren County, New Jersey.

Downtown Stroudsburg is the anchor for the more modern shopping centers that are being built around the area, wanting to be in or near the historic downtown. Businesses include: The Sherman Theater and regional performing arts Center, the MCAC Community Cultural Center, the Monroe County Historical Association, the Pocono Mountains Vacation Bureau, the East Stroudsburg University business accelerator, the Pocono Family YMCA, the US Post Office, the Monroe County Courthouse, the Monroe County Administration Center, the largest regional police force in Pennsylvania, and the Pocono Mountains Chamber of Commerce.

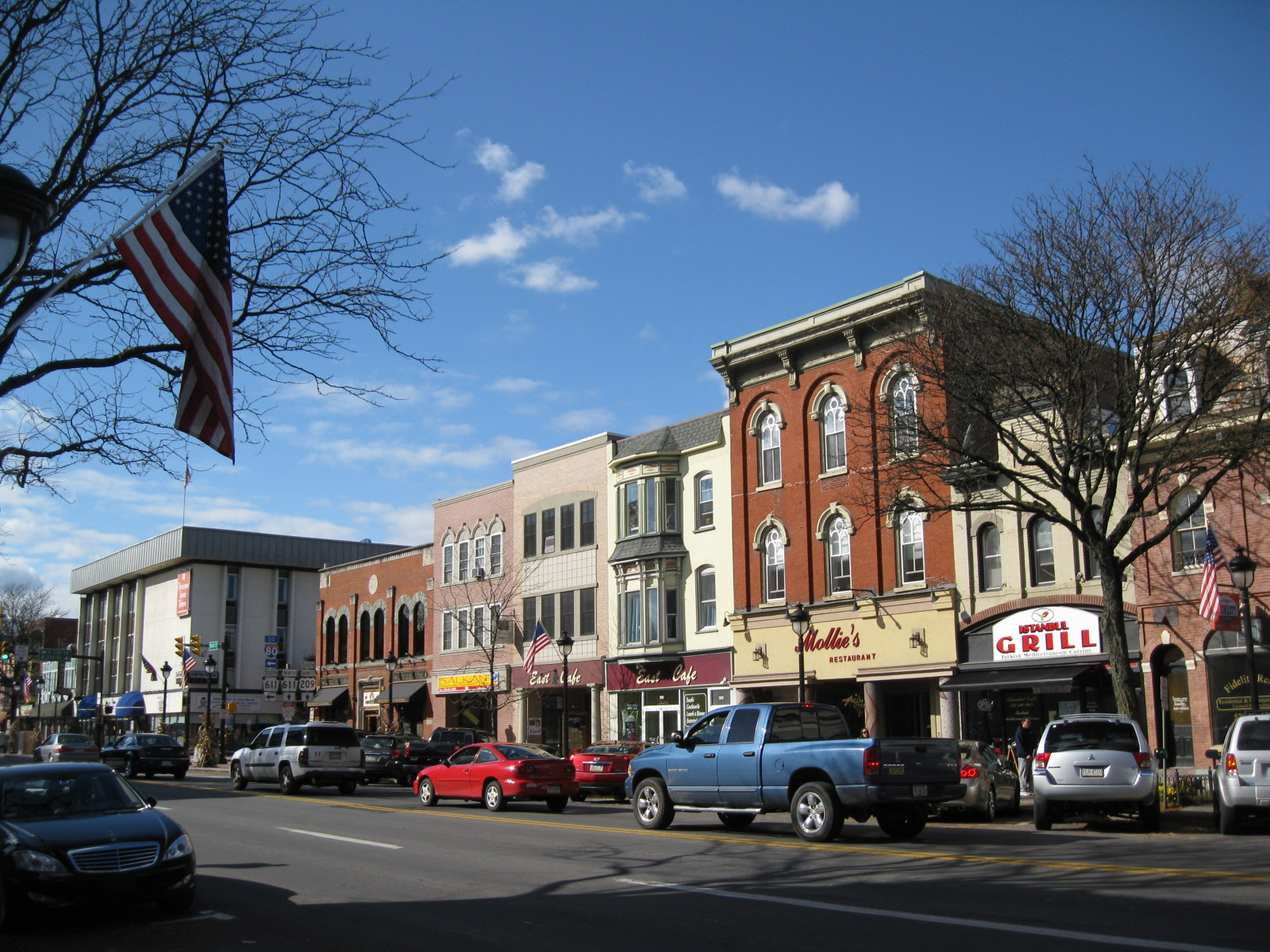
Main Street

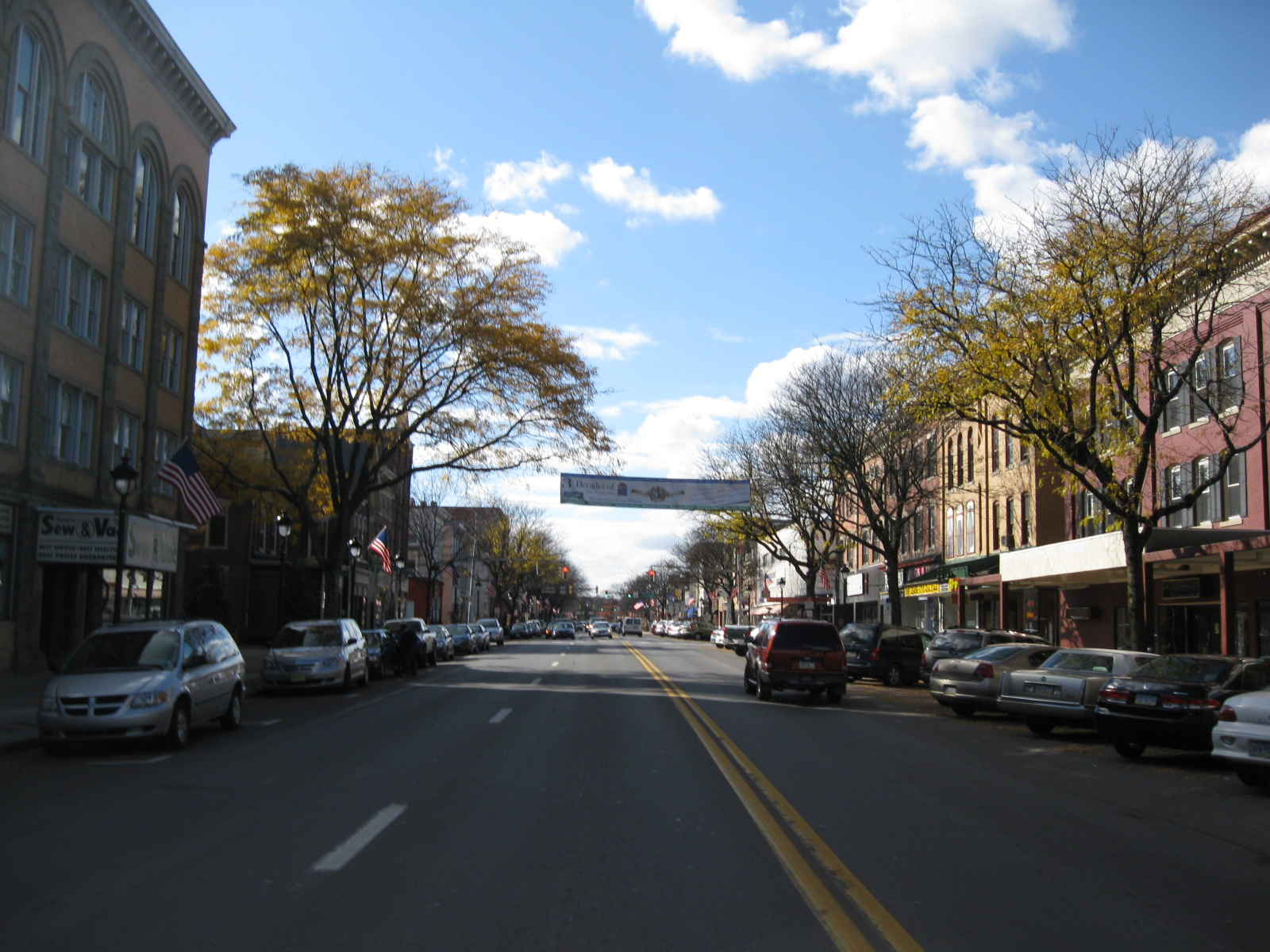
Downtown

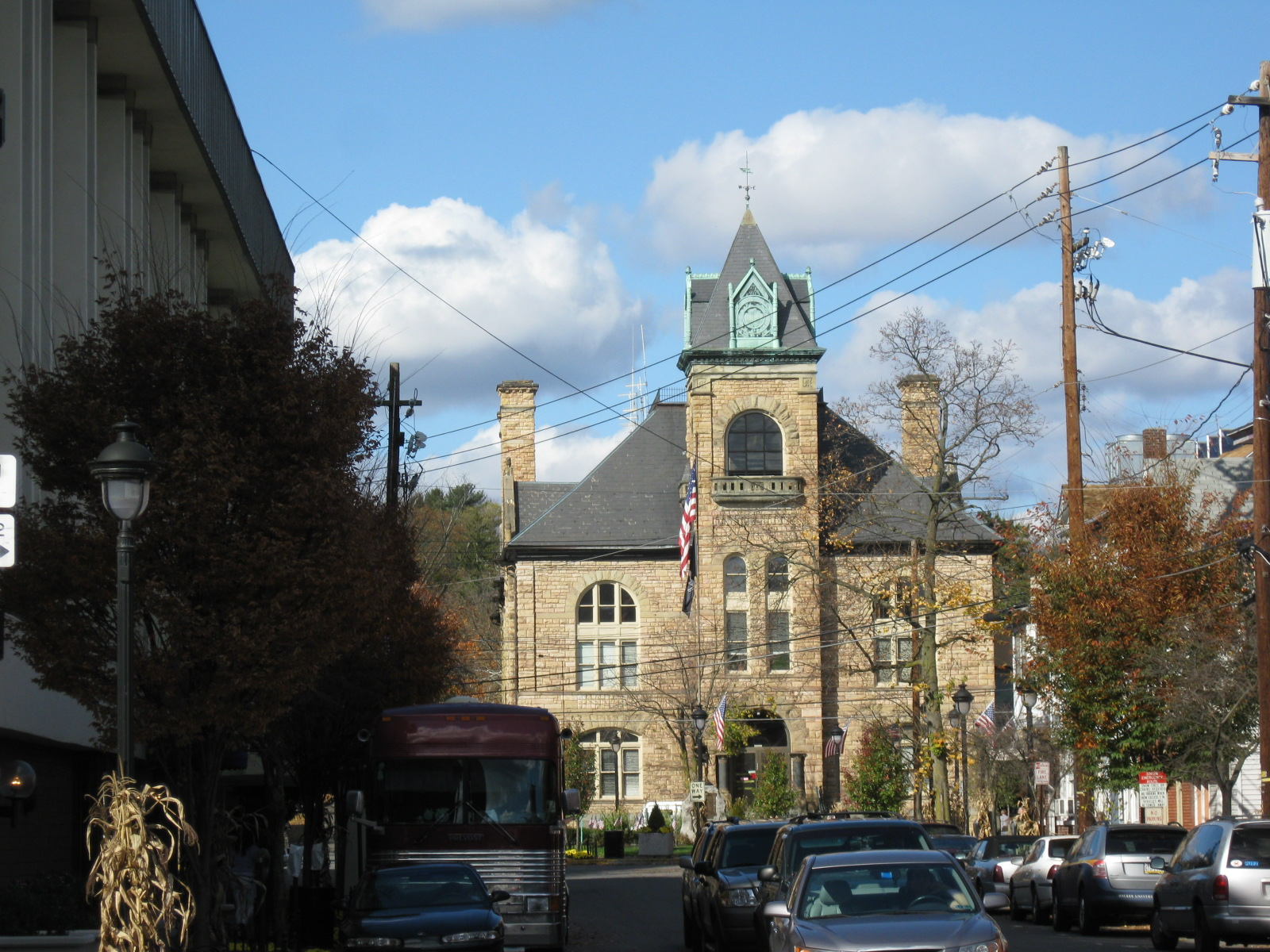
Courthouse

== Demographics ==
Historical population
Census	Pop.	Note	%±
1840	407		—
1850	811		99.3%
1860	1,315		62.1%
1870	1,793		36.3%
1880	1,860		3.7%
1890	2,419		30.1%
1900	3,450		42.6%
1910	4,379		26.9%
1920	5,278		20.5%
1930	5,961		12.9%
1940	6,186		3.8%
1950	6,361		2.8%
1960	6,070		−4.6%
1970	5,451		−10.2%
1980	5,148		−5.6%
1990	5,312		3.2%
2000	5,756		8.4%
2010	5,567		−3.3%
2020	5,927		6.5%
U.S. Decennial Census

As of the 2000 census, there were 5,756 people, 2,422 households, and 1,237 families residing in the borough. The population density was 3,245.1 inhabitants per square mile (1,252.9/km^{2}). There were 2,630 housing units at an average density of 1,482.7 per square mile (572.5/km^{2}). The racial makeup of the borough was 58.05% White, 30.01% African American, 0.21% Native American, 1.89% Asian, 2.26% from other races, and 2.59% from two or more races. Hispanic or Latino of any race were 6.95% of the population.

There were 2,422 households, out of which 25.1% had children under the age of 18 living with them, 34.8% were married couples living together, 13.0% had a female householder with no husband present, and 48.9% were non-families. 34.8% of all households were made up of individuals, and 16.2% had someone living alone who was 65 years of age or older. The average household size was 2.30 and the average family size was 2.98.

The population was spread out, with 21.2% under the age of 18, 15.0% from 18 to 24, 28.3% from 25 to 44, 18.7% from 45 to 64, and 16.8% who were 65 years of age or older. The median age was 35 years. For every 100 females there were 86.8 males. For every 100 females age 18 and over, there were 83.2 males.

The median income for a household in the borough was $32,409, and the median income for a family was $47,500. Males had a median income of $31,952 versus $26,863 for females. The per capita income for the borough was $18,965. About 9.6% of families and 19.3% of the population were below the poverty line, including 20.2% of those under age 18 and 11.3% of those age 65 or over.

== Media ==
Stroudsburg is part of the Scranton/Wilkes-Barre media market. Since 1947, WPCO-840 AM has served the community. Co-owned WSBG-93.5 FM began in 1964. Television stations WBRE-28, WNEP-16, and WYOU-22 each have news bureaus in downtown Stroudsburg. The headquarters of the Pocono Record newspaper is also located in Stroudsburg.

== Infrastructure ==
=== Transportation ===
==== Roads and highways ====
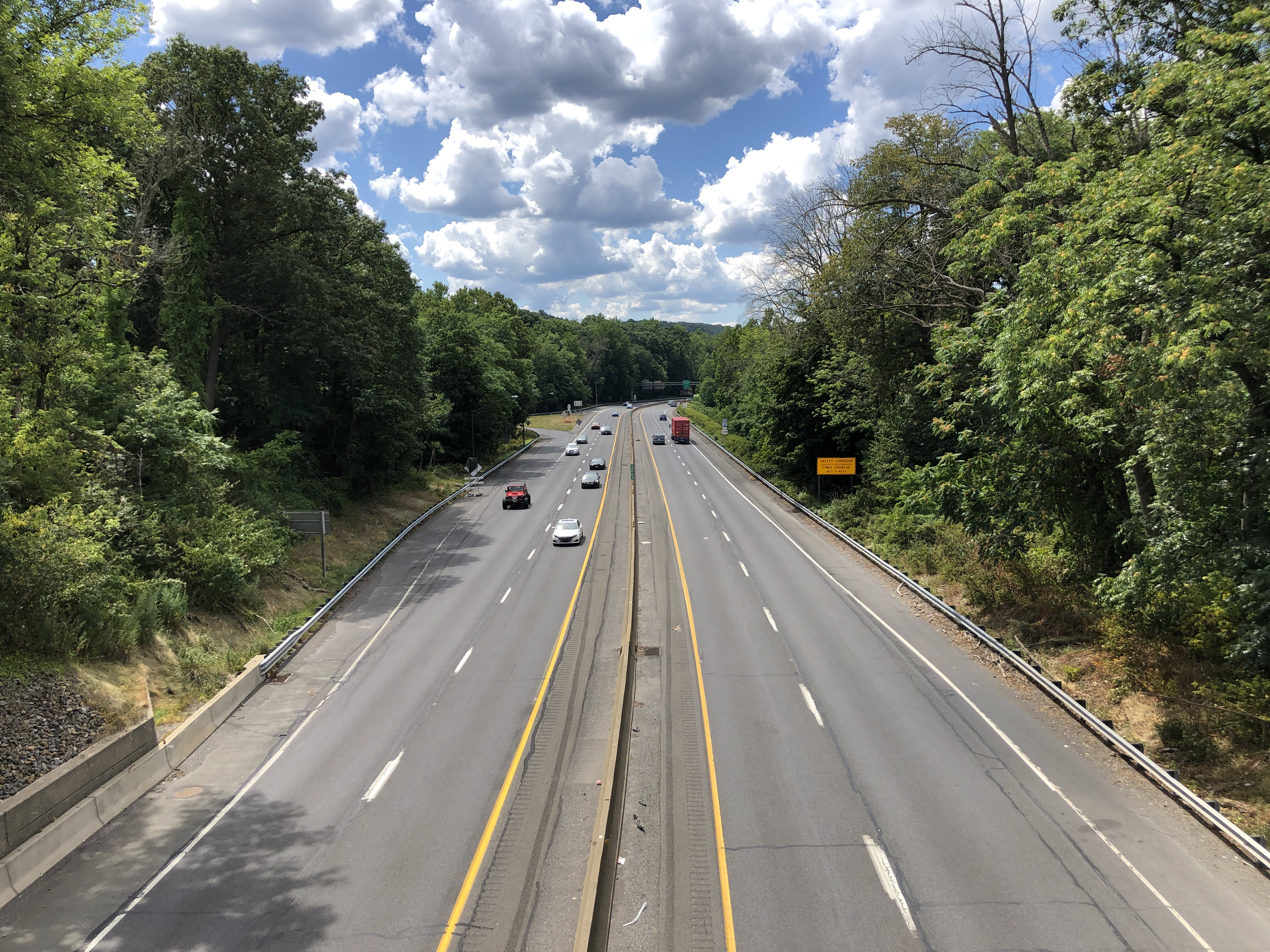
I-80 westbound and US 209 southbound in Stroudsburg

As of 2020, there were 22.68 miles (36.50 km) of public roads in Stroudsburg, of which 7.99 miles (12.86 km) were maintained by the Pennsylvania Department of Transportation (PennDOT) and 14.69 miles (23.64 km) were maintained by the borough.

Interstate 80 and U.S. Route 209 are the most prominent highways serving Stroudsburg. They traverse the borough concurrently via the Keystone Shortway along an east–west alignment across the southern portion of the borough. U.S. Route 209 Business follows Main Street along a southwest–northeast alignment through the center of the borough. Pennsylvania Route 191 follows Broad Street and Fifth Street along a north–south alignment across the eastern part of the borough. Finally, Pennsylvania Route 611 follows Foxtown Hill Road, Park Avenue, Main Street, and Ninth Street along a southeast–northwest alignment through the center of the borough, including a short concurrency with US 209 Business.

==== Public transportation ====
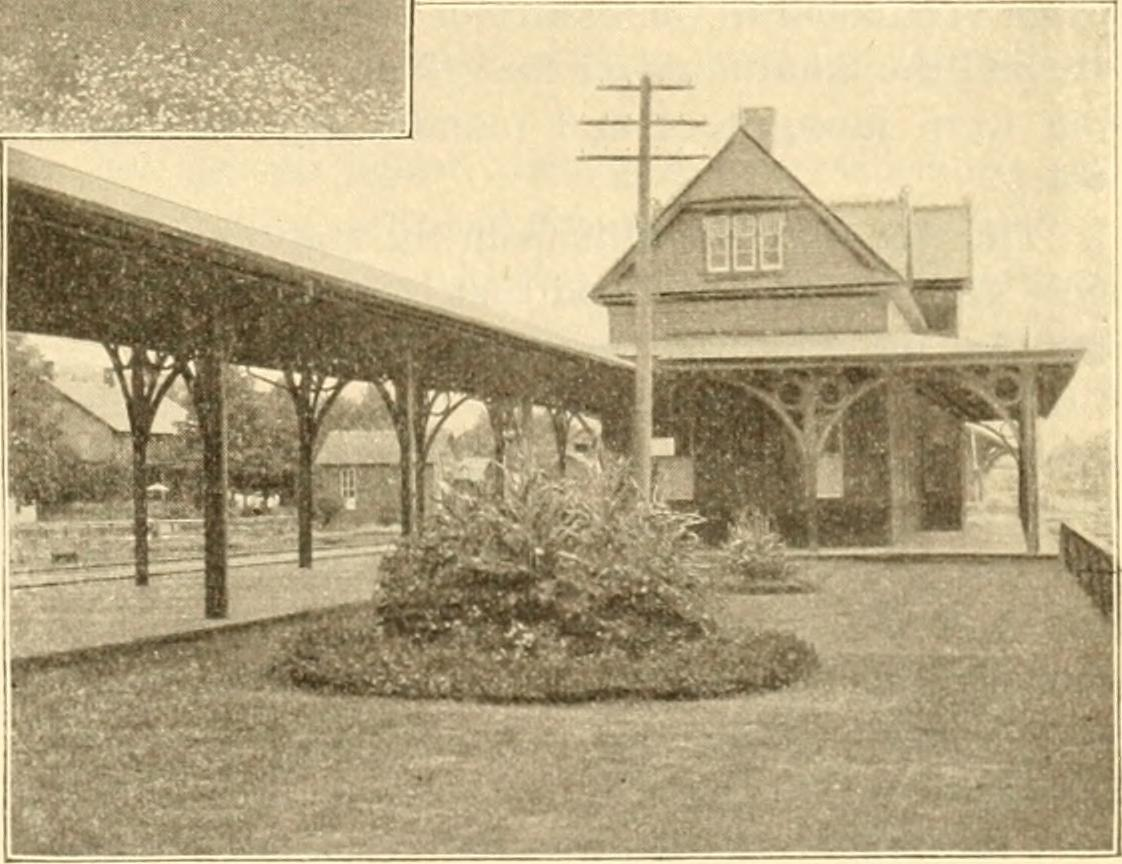
Lackawanna station in the 1890s

The Monroe County Transit Authority (MCTA) serves Monroe County with three bus routes. Stroudsburg is served by MCTA's Blue, Yellow, and Red Routes. Only three of the authority's routes have their hub at the Stroud Mall, the Orange Route goes to Giant in Bartonsville, just northwest of the borough on PA 611 in adjacent Stroud Township. Additional routes include the Silver Route that goes to waterpark and resort Kalahari in addition to the Purple Route. Connections to other MCTA routes are provided at the Stroud Mall.

Until the mid-1960s the Delaware, Lackawanna and Western Railroad and later the Erie Lackawanna Railroad served the town with the Phoebe Snow, the Lake Cities and several other trains. Since the 2010s there have been efforts to restore passenger rail service to New York City, in the Lackawanna Cut-Off Restoration Project. Grants have been committed to bridge restoration to ensure the restoration of train movement.

Martz Bus and Aegean Transportation provide service to NYC, while Uptown Vans partners provide service to Paterson, New Jersey and Upper Manhattan.

=== Utilities ===
PPL Corporation and FirstEnergy subsidiary Met-Ed both provide electricity to Stroudsburg. In the borough, the two companies' service areas overlap and they share utility lines, with the electric provider varying by home or business. Originally, customers could not change the company that maintained the electric line that connected to the home or business, but in 2014, a ruling by the Pennsylvania Utility Commission allowed a business owner to change the owner of the line from Met-Ed to PPL Electric Utilities. UGI Central Penn Gas provides natural gas to Stroudsburg. The Brodhead Creek Regional Authority provides water to Stroudsburg and surrounding areas, with its water supply coming from the Brodhead Creek. The Stroudsburg Borough Sewer Department provides sewer service to the borough, operating a wastewater treatment plant. Trash collection in Stroudsburg is provided by private haulers while recycling collection is provided by the borough.

== Public education ==
The borough is served by the Stroudsburg Area School District. Within this district there are four neighborhood elementary (K-4) schools: Arlington Heights Elementary, B.F. Morey Elementary, Hamilton Elementary, and Stroudsburg Chipperfield Elementary School. There are three other schools within the district: Stroudsburg Middle School (5–7), Stroudsburg Junior High School (8–9), and Stroudsburg High School (10–12). The athletic teams for Stroudsburg High School are called the Mountaineers, and the school colors are maroon and white.

== Politics ==
United States presidential election results for Stroudsburg, Pennsylvania
Year	Republican		Democratic		Third party(ies)	
Year	No.	%	No.	%	No.	%
2024	912	34.93%	1,642	62.89%	57	2.18%
2020	841	31.55%	1,784	66.92%	41	1.54%
2016	778	33.68%	1,432	61.99%	100	4.33%
2012	638	31.18%	1,380	67.45%	28	1.37%
2008	765	32.50%	1,563	66.40%	26	1.10%
2004	857	38.69%	1,343	60.63%	15	0.68%
2000	773	40.77%	1,044	55.06%	79	4.17%

Stroudsburg mayoral election results
Year	Democratic		Republican	
2021	69.54%	726	30.46%	318
2017	66.41%	605	33.59%	306
2015 (Note: Due to the death of Mayor David Deihl, a special election was held.)	52.16%	387	47.84%	355
2013	43.94%	366	56.06%	467
2009 (Note: Mayor Charlie Baughman ran unopposed as a Republican.)	0.00%	0	100.00%	378
2005 (Note: Charlie Baughman won the nomination of both the Democratic and Republican parties.)	56.69%	411	43.31%	314
2001	38.53%	346	61.47%	552

In contrast with its past, Stroudsburg borough is now solidly Democratic, voting for President Joseph R. Biden by over 35 percentage points. Former Mayor Tarah Probst (D) resigned from the office after winning a seat in the Pennsylvania State House of Representatives in the 2022 midterm elections. In December 2022, the City Council appointed Michael Moreno (D) to the office of mayor to fill the remainder of Probst's term, which runs through the 2023 municipal elections. The city council was Democratic controlled, with 6 seats held by Democrats, and 1 seat held by a Democratic/Republican.

== Climate ==
According to the Trewartha climate classification system, Stroudsburg has a Temperate Continental climate with hot summers, cold winters and year-around precipitation (Dcao). Dcao climates are characterized by at least one month having an average mean temperature ≤ 32.0 °F (0 °C), four to seven months with an average mean temperature ≥ 50.0 °F (10 °C), at least one month with an average mean temperature ≥ 72.0 °F (22 °C) and no significant precipitation difference between seasons. Although most summer days are slightly humid in Stroudsburg, episodes of heat and high humidity can occur, with heat index values > 102 °F (39 °C). Since 1981, the highest air temperature has been 100.1 °F (38 °C) on July 22, 2011, and the highest daily average mean dew point was 72.6 °F (23 °C) on August 28, 2018. July is the peak month for thunderstorm activity, which correlates with the average warmest month of the year. The average wettest month is September, which correlates with tropical storm remnants during the peak month of the Atlantic hurricane season. Since 1981, the wettest calendar day has been 6.35 inches (161 mm), on October 8, 2005. During the winter months, the plant hardiness zone is 6b, with an average annual extreme minimum air temperature of −4.8 °F (−20 °C). Since 1981, the coldest air temperature has been −18.1 °F (−28 °C), on January 21, 1994. Episodes of extreme cold and wind can occur, with wind chill values < −16 °F (−27 °C). The average snowiest month is January, which correlates with the average coldest month of the year. Ice storms and large snowstorms depositing ≥ 12 inches (30 cm) of snow occur once every couple of years, particularly during nor’easters from December through February.

Climate data for East Stroudsburg, Pennsylvania (1991–2020 normals, extremes 1911–present)
Month	Jan	Feb	Mar	Apr	May	Jun	Jul	Aug	Sep	Oct	Nov	Dec	Year
Record high °F (°C)	72 (22)	75 (24)	87 (31)	96 (36)	97 (36)	100 (38)	104 (40)	103 (39)	106 (41)	95 (35)	86 (30)	72 (22)	106 (41)
Mean daily maximum °F (°C)	35.8 (2.1)	39.3 (4.1)	48.2 (9.0)	61.9 (16.6)	72.1 (22.3)	79.6 (26.4)	84.3 (29.1)	82.3 (27.9)	74.9 (23.8)	63.0 (17.2)	51.0 (10.6)	40.4 (4.7)	61.1 (16.2)
Daily mean °F (°C)	27.5 (−2.5)	30.0 (−1.1)	38.0 (3.3)	49.5 (9.7)	59.8 (15.4)	67.8 (19.9)	72.7 (22.6)	70.7 (21.5)	63.6 (17.6)	51.7 (10.9)	41.2 (5.1)	32.5 (0.3)	50.4 (10.2)
Mean daily minimum °F (°C)	19.3 (−7.1)	20.6 (−6.3)	27.9 (−2.3)	37.2 (2.9)	47.4 (8.6)	56.1 (13.4)	61.0 (16.1)	59.2 (15.1)	52.3 (11.3)	40.4 (4.7)	31.5 (−0.3)	24.5 (−4.2)	39.8 (4.3)
Record low °F (°C)	−35 (−37)	−21 (−29)	−11 (−24)	10 (−12)	24 (−4)	32 (0)	36 (2)	32 (0)	20 (−7)	14 (−10)	2 (−17)	−14 (−26)	−35 (−37)
Average precipitation inches (mm)	3.78 (96)	3.12 (79)	4.04 (103)	4.31 (109)	4.41 (112)	5.50 (140)	4.71 (120)	4.83 (123)	5.30 (135)	5.24 (133)	3.89 (99)	4.42 (112)	53.55 (1,360)
Average snowfall inches (cm)	11.3 (29)	10.3 (26)	9.5 (24)	0.9 (2.3)	0.0 (0.0)	0.0 (0.0)	0.0 (0.0)	0.0 (0.0)	0.0 (0.0)	0.1 (0.25)	1.5 (3.8)	8.0 (20)	41.6 (106)
Average precipitation days (≥ 0.01 in)	12.7	11.2	11.4	12.4	13.9	12.0	12.3	11.7	9.5	12.0	10.9	12.3	142.3
Average snowy days (≥ 0.1 in)	7.4	6.1	4.3	0.7	0.0	0.0	0.0	0.0	0.0	0.1	1.0	4.9	24.5
Source: NOAA

== Ecology ==
According to the A. W. Kuchler U.S. potential natural vegetation types, Stroudsburg would have a dominant vegetation type of Appalachian Oak (104) with a dominant vegetation form of Eastern Hardwood Forest (25). The peak spring bloom typically occurs in late-April and peak fall color usually occurs in mid-October. The plant hardiness zone is 6b with an average annual extreme minimum air temperature of −4.8 °F (−20 °C).

== Notable people ==
- Bugz Ronin, American record producer and songwriter
- Al Cohn, jazz saxophonist
- George Gorse, art historian
- Sebastian Joseph-Day, football player, Pittsburgh Steelers
- Byron K. Lichtenberg, astronaut who flew on STS-9 and STS-45
- Chris Neild, American football player for the Washington Commanders
- Mike Nikorak, baseball player
- A. Mitchell Palmer, 50th attorney general of the United States
- Richard Puryear, African American railroad worker lynched by a mob in 1894
- Debralee Scott, actress
- Joseph Horace Shull, former U.S. Congressman
- G.E. Smith, musician
- John Summerfield Staples, substitute for President Abraham Lincoln as part of the Enrollment Act of 1863

== In popular culture ==
- Stroudsburg is mentioned in The Office, season 2 episode 12 The Injury, when Michael tells Ryan “Did you go to the one at Stroudsburg? Because they always have yams”.
