= Pocono Record =

Daily newspaper based in Stroudsburg, Pennsylvania

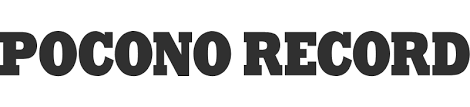
- Logo
- Type: Daily newspaper
- Format: Broadsheet
- Owner: USA Today Co.
- Editor: Kathryne Rubright
- Founded: April 2, 1894 (as the Stroudsburg Daily Times)
- Headquarters: 511 Lenox Street, Stroudsburg, Pennsylvania, 18360 United States
- Circulation: 4,544 Daily; 6,989 Sunday (as of 2018)
- Website: poconorecord.com

The Pocono Record is a daily newspaper published in print and online in Stroudsburg, Pennsylvania, United States.

== History ==
The Pocono Record was founded as the Stroudsburg Daily Times on April 2, 1894. The article "The" was dropped from the newspaper's name in 1989.

In 1946 the newspaper was purchased by James H. Ottaway Sr., becoming the third newspaper in what would become the Ottaway Community Newspapers chain, which was purchased by Dow Jones and Company in the 1980s. Dow Jones was eventually purchased by News Corp.

On September 4, 2013, News Corp sold Dow Jones Local Media Group to Newcastle Investment Corp., an affiliate of Fortress Investment Group, for $87 million. News Corp CEO and former Wall Street Journal editor Robert James Thomson indicated that the newspapers were "not strategically consistent with the emerging portfolio" of the company.

The newspapers were thereafter operated by GateHouse Media, a newspaper group owned by Fortress. GateHouse in turn filed prepackaged Chapter 11 bankruptcy on September 27, 2013, to restructure its debt obligations in order to accommodate the acquisition. Newcastle combined Local Media Group with the post-bankruptcy GateHouse Media later in 2013 to form New Media Investment Group.

New Media Investment Group acquired newspaper conglomerate Gannett in 2019. The combined company adopted the Gannett name and in 2025 renamed itself USA Today Co. The Pocono Record is owned by USA Today Co. as of 2026.

== Market ==
The Pocono Record is the newspaper of record for Monroe County, Pennsylvania. Its coverage area centers on Stroudsburg and East Stroudsburg and includes the area's many small communities. The newspaper also covers parts of Pike, Lackawanna, Wayne and Carbon counties as well as areas of western New Jersey.

The Pocono Record lacks any direct local competitors but competes against newspapers such as the New York Post and New York Daily News. In addition, the Pocono Record competes with regional publications such as the Wilkes-Barre Times-Leader, Scranton Times-Tribune and the Allentown Morning Call.

== Operations ==
The Pocono Record publishes seven days a week. The newspaper is available via home delivery or at newsstands and retail locations throughout the area. The publication announced in 2022 that it would cease delivering newspapers on Saturdays.

=== Newsroom ===
The Pocono Record's newsroom is located in Stroudsburg, along with the newspaper's administrative and sales offices.

=== Website ===
The Pocono Record first went online in the early 1990s. Its website, PoconoRecord.com, is updated daily with the a digital version of the print edition as well as throughout the day with breaking news and updates.

== Sister publications ==
In addition to its flagship daily newspaper, the Pocono Record publishes several other publications:

=== Eastern Poconos Community News ===
The Eastern Poconos Community News, or Community News for short, is mailed free of charge to residents of eastern Monroe County. The weekly paper, which debuted in 1999, features some original material and columns, but relies heavily on reprinting stories from the daily Pocono Record. About 9,700 copies are mailed to residents of Smithfield, Middle Smithfield, Price and Lehman townships.
