= List of United States post offices in Connecticut =

United States post offices operate under the authority of the United States Post Office Department (1792–1971) or the United States Postal Service (since 1971). Historically, post offices were usually placed in a prominent location and many were architecturally distinctive, including notable buildings featuring Beaux-Arts, Art Deco, and Vernacular architecture. However, modern U.S. post offices were generally designed for functionality rather than architectural style.

Following is a list of United States post offices in Connecticut. Notable post offices include individual buildings, whether still in service or not, which have architectural, historical, or community-related significance. Many of these are listed on the National Register of Historic Places (NRHP) or state and local historic registers.

Post office	City	Date built	Image	Architect	Notes	Ref.
United States Post Office–Ansonia Main	Ansonia	1914		Oscar Wenderoth	(Note: Listed on the National Register of Historic Places.)	
United States Post Office–Bridgeport Main	Bridgeport	1934		Louis A. Simon		
United States Post Office (Greenwich, Connecticut)	Greenwich	1915		Louis A. Simon		
U.S. Post Office and Federal Building, now called William R. Cotter Federal Building	Hartford	1931–1933		Malmfeldt, Adams, & Prentice		
United States Post Office–Manchester Main, now Weiss Center	Manchester	1931		James A. Wetmore		
United States Post Office–Meriden Main	Meriden	1907		James Knox Taylor		
Old Middletown Post Office	Middletown	1916		James A. Wetmore		
United States Post Office–Milford Main	Milford	1931		James A. Wetmore		
United States Post Office–Naugatuck Main	Naugatuck	1916		James A. Wetmore		
United States Post Office–New London Main	New London	1932–1934		Payne & Keefe		
United States Post Office–South Norwalk Main	Norwalk	1936		Thomas Harlan Ellett, Louis A. Simon		
United States Post Office–Norwich Main	Norwich	1905		James Knox Taylor		
United States Post Office–Stamford Main	Stamford	1915–1916		Louis A. Simon		
United States Post Office (Westport, Connecticut)	Westport	1935		Lansing C. Holding		
