= Lansing Colton Holden =

Lansing Colton Holden may refer to:

- Lansing C. Holden, an architect
- Lansing Colton Holden Jr., an aviator
