= Lansing Holden =

Lansing Holden may refer to:

- Lansing C. Holden (1858–1930), an architect
- Lansing Colton Holden Jr. (1896–1938), an aviator
