= Gentex =

Gentex or Gentex Corporation may refer to:

- Gentex (standard), a protocol for telegraphs
- Gentex (automotive manufacturer)
- Gentex (military contractor)
