= Watkins-Maxey House =

Historic house in Pennsylvania, United States

- Formerly listed on the U.S. National Register of Historic Places
- Location: 520 Monroe Ave., Scranton, Pennsylvania
- Area: 4 acres (1.6 ha)
- Built: 1895
- Architect: Lansing C. Holden, Bill Lewis
- Architectural style: Renaissance, Chateauesque
- NRHP reference No.: 80003506

Significant dates
- Added to NRHP: 1980
- Removed from NRHP: June 27, 1986

Watkins-Maxey House, also known as Hebrew Day School, was a historic home located at Scranton, Lackawanna County, Pennsylvania. It was built in 1895, and was a Renaissance Revival style dwelling.

It was added to the National Register of Historic Places in 1980. It was delisted in 1986, after being demolished.
