= Klots Throwing Company Mill =

Historic mill in Maryland, USA

- U.S. National Register of Historic Places
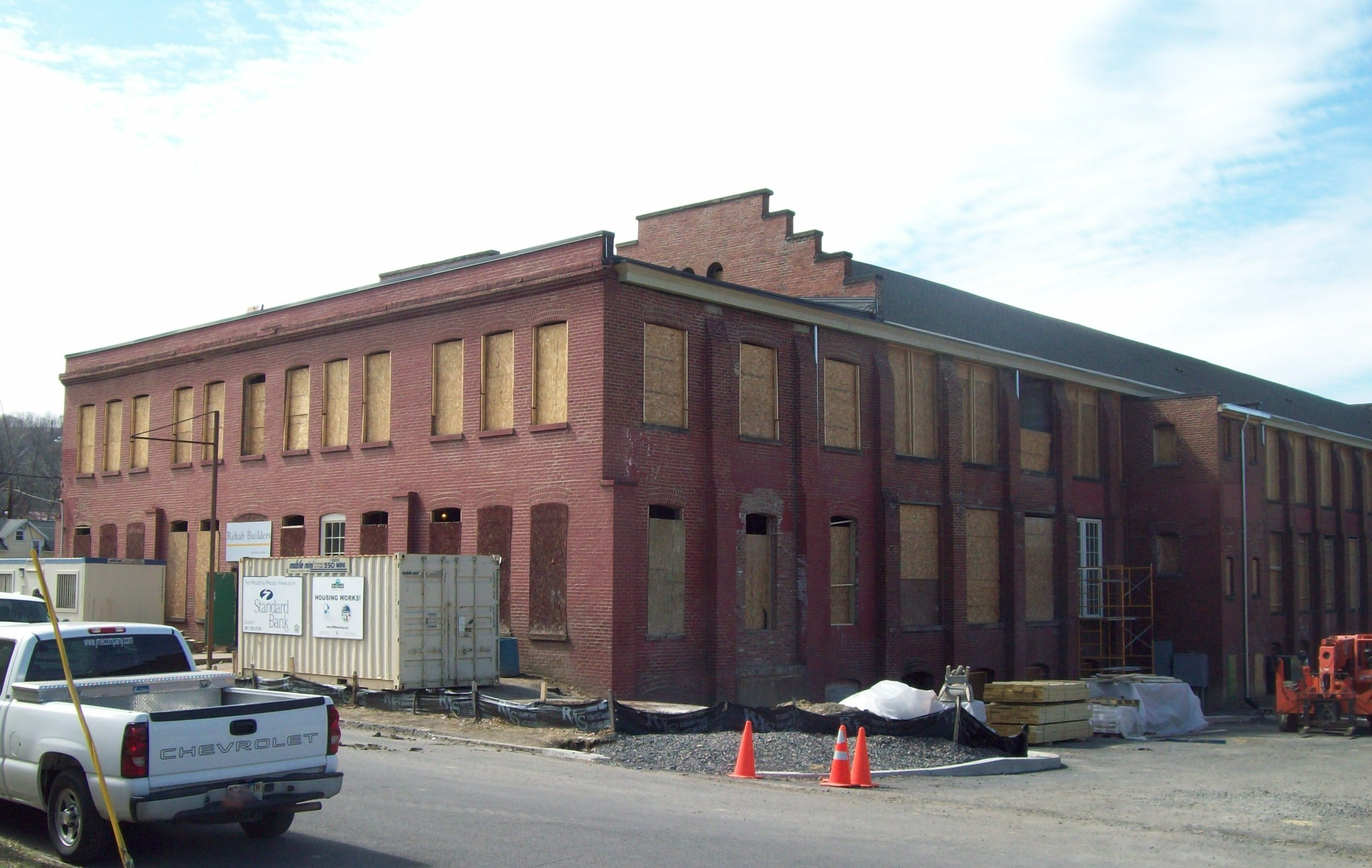
- Klots Throwing Company Mill, March 2011

- Location within Maryland Location within the United States
- Nearest city: 917 Gay St., Cumberland, Maryland
- Coordinates: 39°38′34.38″N 78°45′38.16″W
- Area: 2.4 acres (0.97 ha)
- Built: 1902
- Architect: Lansing C. Holden
- Architectural style: Late 19th And 20th Century Revivals
- NRHP reference No.: 09001282
- Added to NRHP: January 27, 2010

Klots Throwing Company Mill is a historic silk mill located at Cumberland in Allegany County, Maryland, United States. It was built in 1902–1903, and is a long two-story brick building with double-gable roofs and paired stepped parapets. An addition was built in 1909. It was operated by Gentex Corporation and closed in 1972. The building was subsequently used for storage. From 1988 until 2002, the north end of the building housed the Western Maryland Food Bank. The building will be converted to loft apartments.

It was listed on the National Register of Historic Places in 2010.
