= Future Assault Shell Technology helmet =

Combat helmet

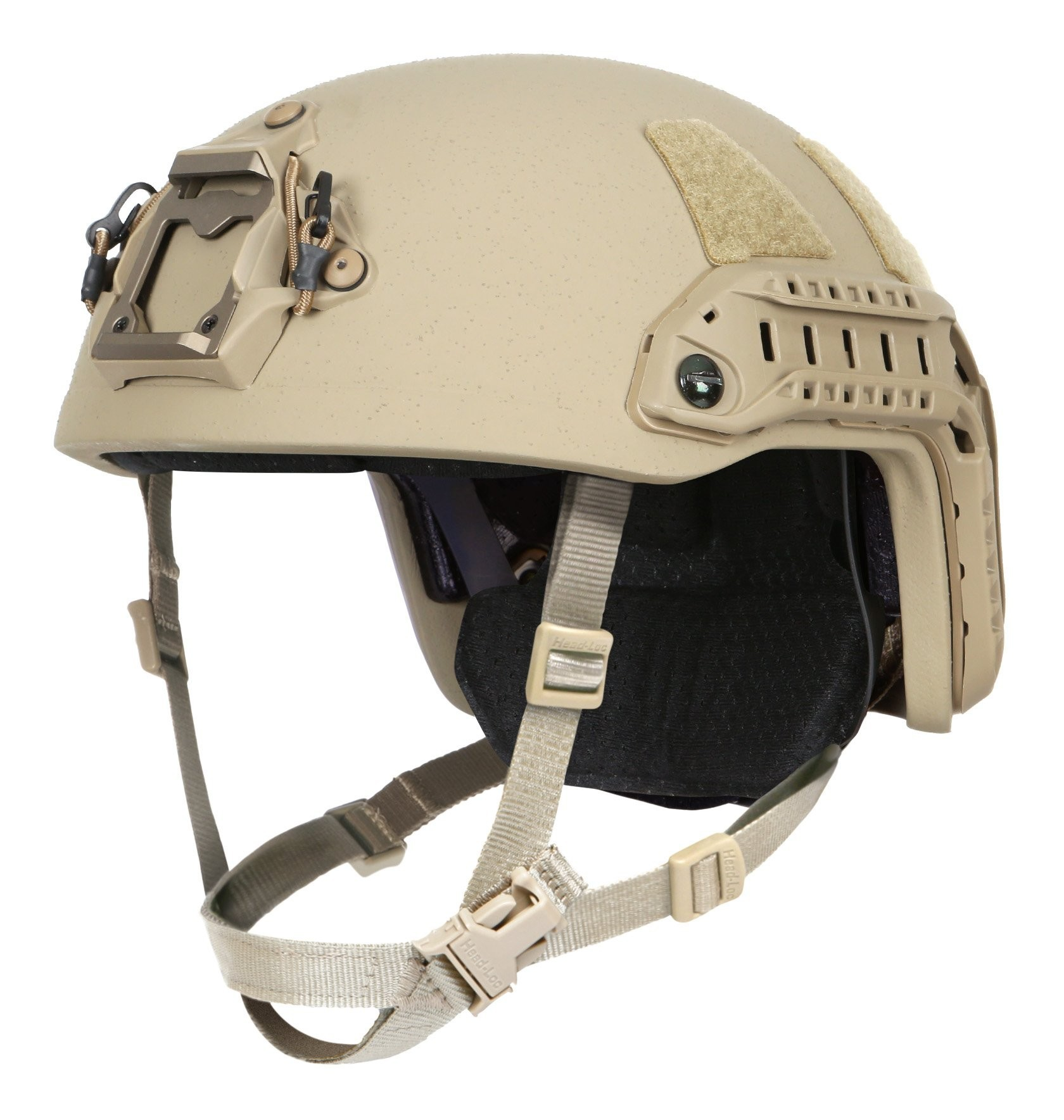
- Ops-Core FAST Helmet
- Type: Combat helmet
- Place of origin: United States

Service history
- In service: 2009–present
- Used by: See Users
- Wars: Global War on Terrorism; War in Afghanistan; Iraq War; War on drugs Syrian Civil War; Kurdish-Turkish War; Second Libyan Civil War; Russo-Ukrainian War

Production history
- Designer: U.S. Army Research Laboratory in collaboration with the U.S. Army Natick Soldier Research, Development and Engineering Center and the Program Executive Office (PEO) Soldier
- Manufacturer: Ops-Core (a part of Gentex)
- Produced: 2007 – present
- Variants: ballistic: FAST Sentry; FAST XP; FAST Maritime (MT); FAST SF; FAST RF1; FAST XR; non-ballistic: FAST Bump (Base Jump); FAST Carbon; FAST SF Carbon Composite

Specifications
- Weight: 667–1592 g (1.47–3.51 lbs)

The Ops-Core Future Assault Shell Technology (FAST) helmet, also known as the FAST helmet, is an American combat helmet used by special operations forces and law enforcement tactical organizations in various countries, as well as the current standard protective headgear of the Norwegian Armed Forces and New Zealand Army.

The FAST helmet series features a distinctive shell shape, with ear cut geometry which extends coverage over the rear occipital bone without load carrier interference, and optimizes weight distribution for increased stability, integration, balance, and comfort. The helmet features various suspension and retention systems, and ARC rails which, similar to picatinny rails, enable users to mount items like helmet lights and cameras.

== History ==
The FAST helmet was developed by the U.S. Army Research Laboratory in collaboration with the U.S. Army Natick Soldier Research, Development and Engineering Center and the Program Executive Office (PEO) Soldier as part of the Army Manufacturing Technology (ManTech) Program, which also led to the development of the Enhanced Combat Helmet (ECH).

The name FAST helmet was coined by a manufacturing company called Ops-Core in 2005. In 2008, Ops-Core showed off their prototype helmet with their Head-Loc™ Helmet Retention System (a.k.a. Head-Loc Retention System) at the 2008 SHOT Show convention. The helmet was publicly revealed in 2009 at the annual SHOT Show. It was issued to U.S. special forces operators deployed in Afghanistan.

In 2019, U.S. Special Operations Command awarded Gentex a contract worth $95 million to supply Ops-Core FAST SF Super High Cut Helmets that were released in 2018.

== Development ==
Compared to standard combat helmets, the FAST helmet offers up to 25% weight reduction and is notable for its early use of ultra-high-molecular-weight polyethylene fibers (UHMWPE) in its design. It was also designed to allow outside features such as wearing communications headsets which can be attached with rail adapters.

=== Design ===
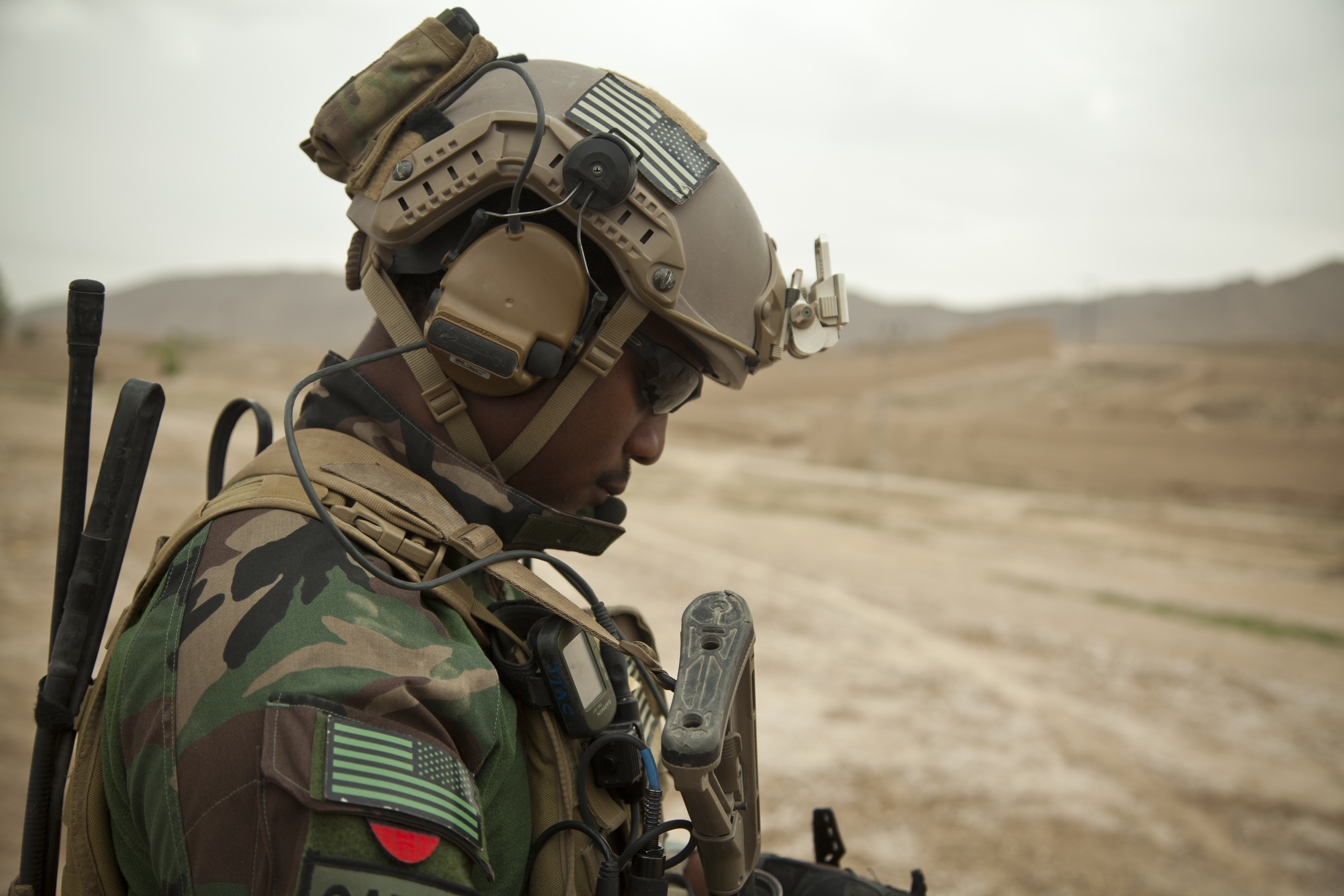
U.S. Marine Raider wearing a FAST Maritime helmet and U.S. Woodland camouflage combat uniform

The FAST helmet ranges in weight from about 667–1592 g (1.47–3.51 lbs). The type of UHMWPE material for the ballistic FAST models provides increased protection against NIJ Level IIIA handgun rounds. It can be fitted with a mounting bracket, patented first in 2014, for accessories like night vision goggles and communications headsets, similar to PASGT and MICH. Users can wear it with different communications headsets with ease and comfort. The Velcro featured on to the helmet also allows for the wearer to attach national flag or the emblem of unit which they belong to, in addition to other IFF (Identification friend or foe) patches such as call sign and blood type.

It has different color options, such as foliage green, black, olive green, ranger green, tan 499, urban grey, MultiCam and desert MARPAT. As well as having mesh and cloth helmet covers in varying camouflage patterns.

The FAST RF1 High Cut Helmet System released in 2021 is a rifle rated ballistic helmet at an average of 3.5 lbs (1592 grams) able to protect against rifle rounds like the 7.62×39mm and 7.62x51mm due to the 0.400" (10.16mm) shell thickness. The different color options are tan 499, ranger green, MultiCam, black, and urban gray.

The FAST XR Helmet System released in 2022 represents an intermediate in protection between the SF line of helmets and the RF1 Helmet System, protecting against 7.62×39mm rifle rounds at a distance of 10 feet, but not against larger rounds such as 7.62×51mm. This is due to having a shell thickness of 0.280" (7.112mm). It is far lighter than the RF1, averaging at only about half a pound heavier than the SF helmet, depending on the type of chinstrap. It is available in Tan 499, Ranger Green, MultiCam, Black, and Urban Gray.

In addition to military and law enforcement, the non-ballistic version of the helmet also has gained considerable popularity among civilian occupations, such as outdoor sportsmen, journalists, disaster relief personnel and other field workers due to its modular design.

== Users ==
The FAST family of helmets are ubiquitous across military, police, and other uniformed services around the world.

=== Current ===
- Algeria: Used by the Algerian special forces.
- Armenia: Mostly used by special forces. Few used by reconnaissance, scout, and infantry divisions. Seen in 2021 Armed Forces of Armenia exercises.
- Austria: 20,000 Sentry XP Mid Cut-type helmets ordered in 2016, adopted by the Austrian Armed Forces in 2017.
- Brazil: Used by the Brazilian Army and the Brazilian Marine Corps.
- Chile: Used by the Special Forces of the Chilean Army.
- Denmark: Used by the Jaeger Corps and other SOKOM units.
- Finland: Worn by Finnish Naval Special Forces Coastal Jaegers and the Guards Jaeger Regiment's urban jaegers as well as other front-line troops.
- Georgia: Used by police and state security special units. DH MK-III made by STC Delta issued to GSOF and other military units.
- Islamic Emirate of Afghanistan: Ex ANA stocks in use by the Islamic Emirate Army and paramilitary special police units including the GCPSU.
- Luxembourg: Standard helmet of Luxembourg Armed Forces.
- Malaysia: In 2016, a contract was signed with Usahawan PSE Sdn Bhd to supply FAST helmets to the Malaysian military under RM45.9 million. The first Malaysian unit issued with the helmet is the 7th Royal Ranger Regiment.
- New Zealand: In 2024, it was announced that as part of the SPPE OPS-CORE Hi cut helmets would be introduced to all soldiers of the New Zealand Army starting with Tranche 1 in July 2024, Tranche 2 will deliver to the remainder of units in Mid 2025. OPS-CORE Fast variants have previously been in use with New Zealand Special Air Service troopers.
- Norway: In 2011, the Norwegian Defense Logistic Organization (NDLO) selected the FAST helmet as the new standard issue protective headgear for the Norwegian Army and National Guard. The decision was made after positive results from rounds of ballistic and safety testing and has been previously fielded by the Norwegian Special Forces in both Afghanistan and Iraq. This replaces the PASGT made by Cato Ringstad.
- Philippines: Different variations of Ops Core FAST. helmets and clone copies are used by different units in the Armed Forces of the Philippines, Philippine National Police, Philippine Coast Guard, Bureau of Corrections, Bureau of Jail Management and Penology and the Bureau of Fire Protection, but the most notable users are the Philippine NAVSOCOM as they are the first unit to use them starting late 2015.
- Poland: FAST Ballistic High Cut helmets used by JW GROM and JW Formoza operators. 50 thousand HP-05 ordered for Polish Army.
- Serbia: FAST helmets used by most Gendarmerie units.
- Sweden: FAST Maritime Helmets used by Särskilda operationsgruppen.
- Turkey: Used by special forces of Turkish Armed Forces, with a reported incident where a Turkish soldier's life was saved when his Ops-Core Sentry-type helmet was shot at in 2015.
- Ukraine: Used by Special Operations Forces.
- United Arab Emirates: The UAE Presidential Guard is equipped with the FAST Ballistic High Cut helmet, announced in 2013.
- United States: Used by special operations forces. FAST XP and FTHS is used by Delta Force. FAST Maritime and FTHS is used by DEVGRU. Navy SEALs have used the LBH with AOR1 shell until it was replaced by FTHS. LBH with AOR2 shell is used by SWCC. AFSOC, Special Forces, 75th Ranger Regiment and Marine Raider Regiment use the FAST Maritime.
  - In use with the LAPD SWAT, where a SWAT officer credited the helmet for saving his life from being shot in the head in 2017.
  - Small number of FAST SF helmets purchased by the FBI SWAT teams.

=== Former ===
- Afghanistan: Used by the Afghan National Army Commando Corps.

== Gallery ==

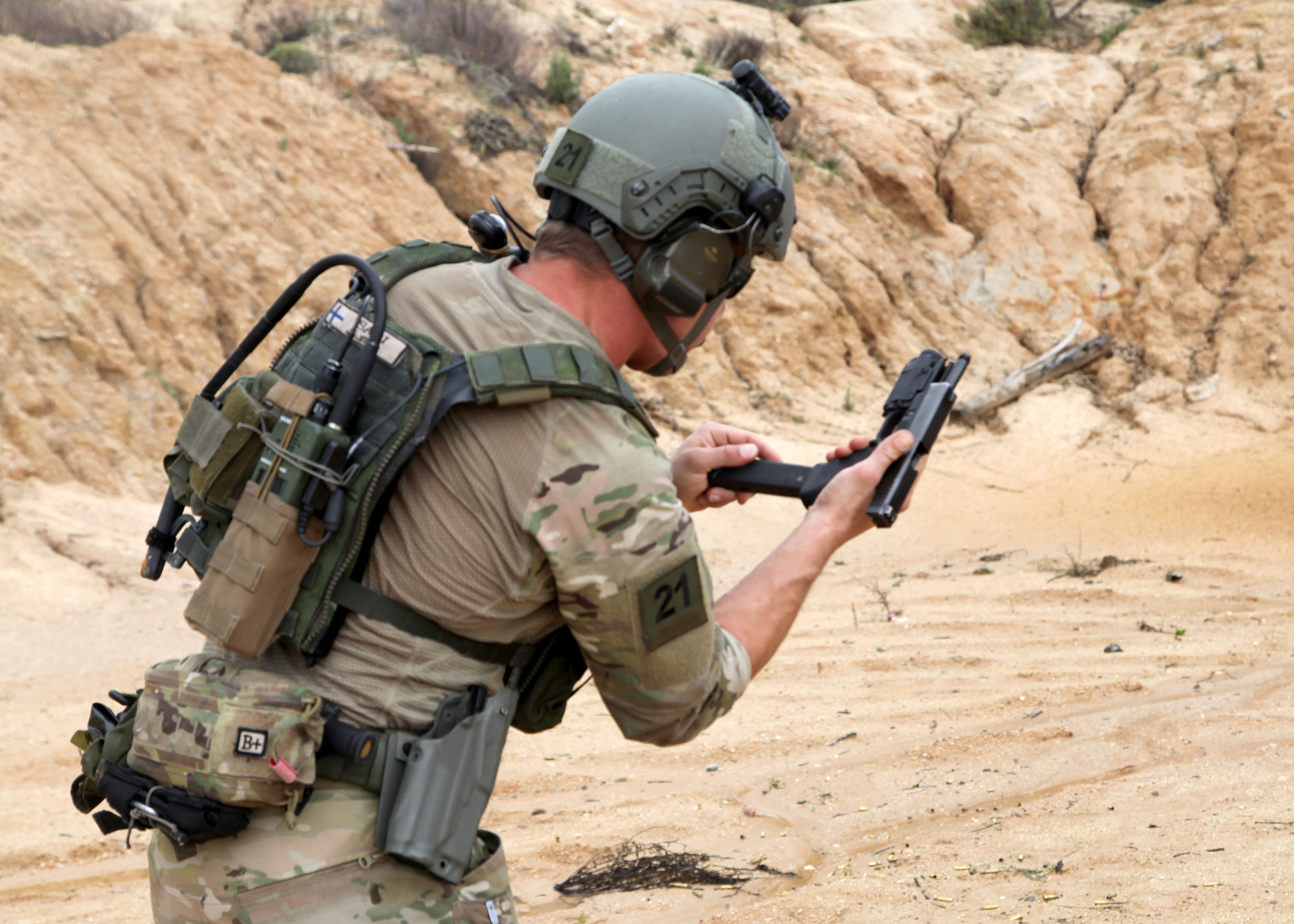

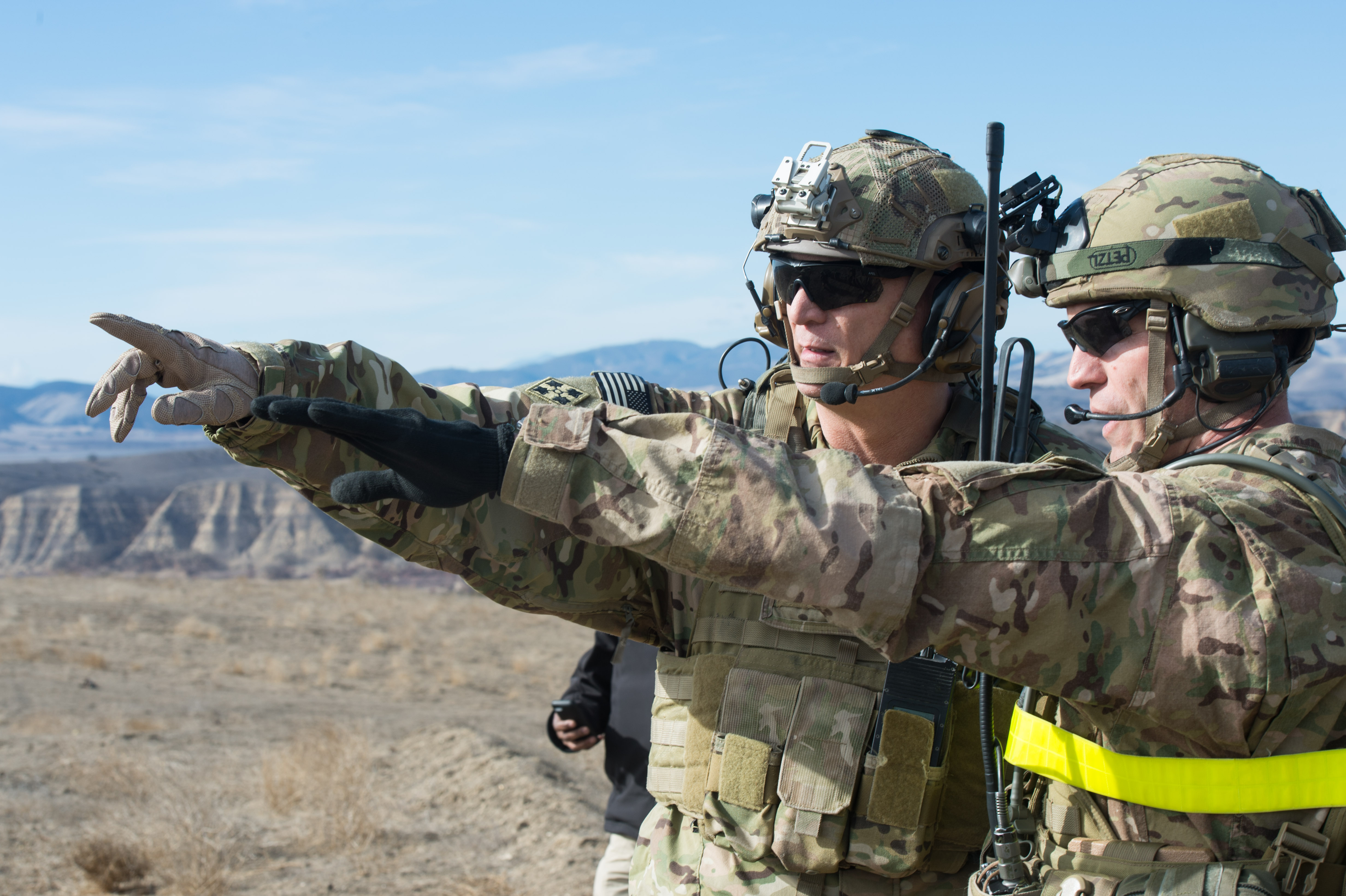

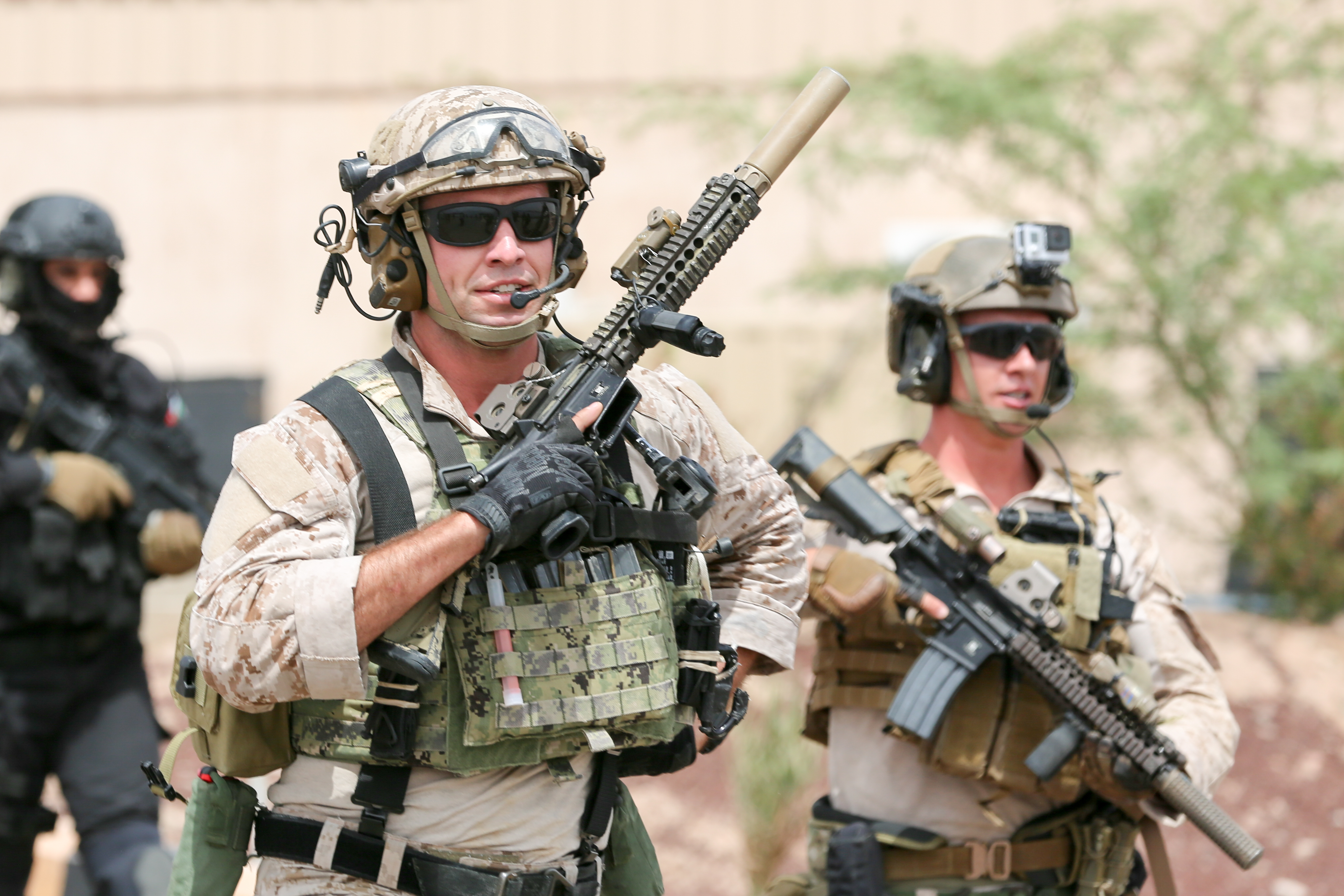

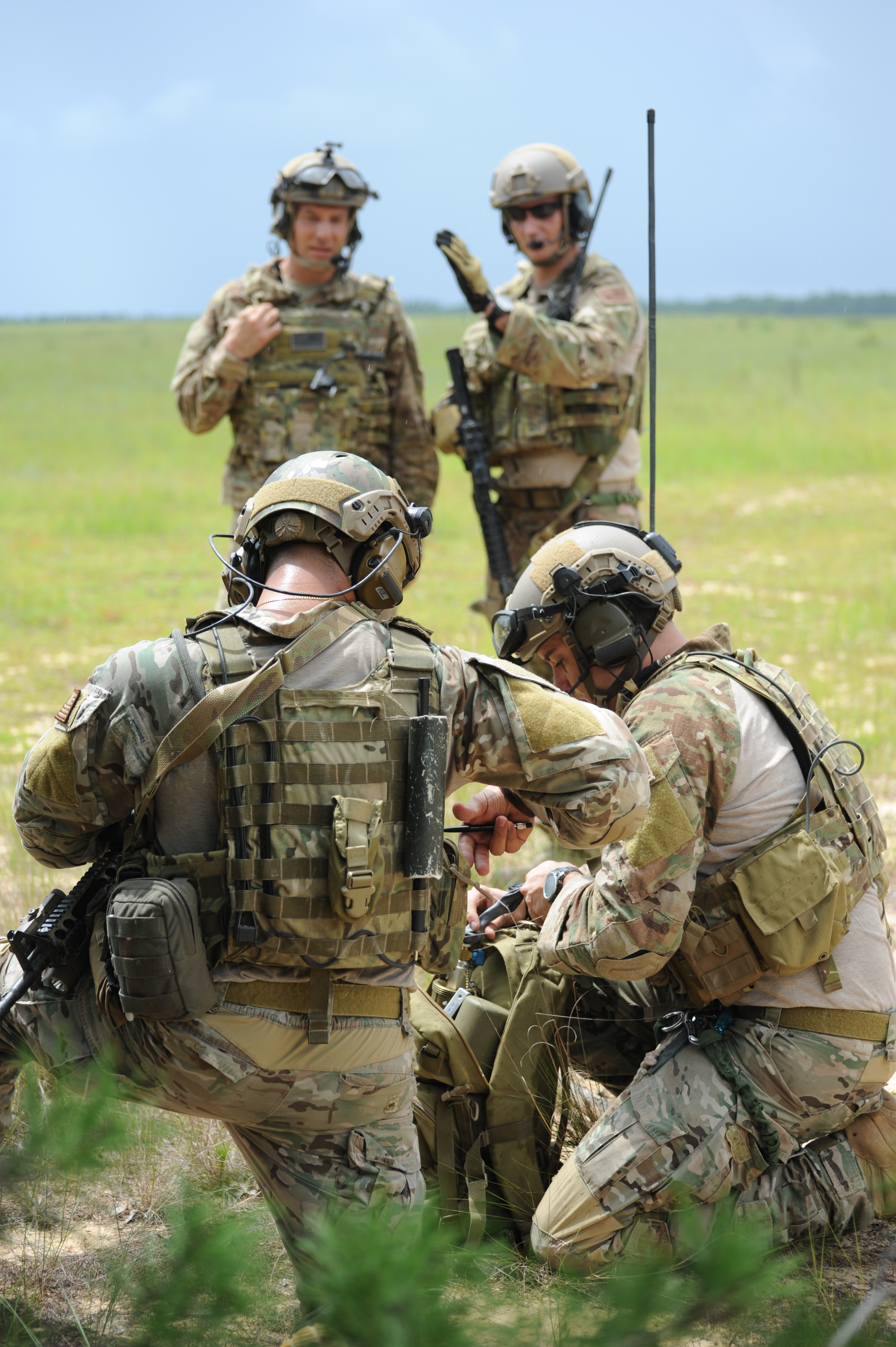

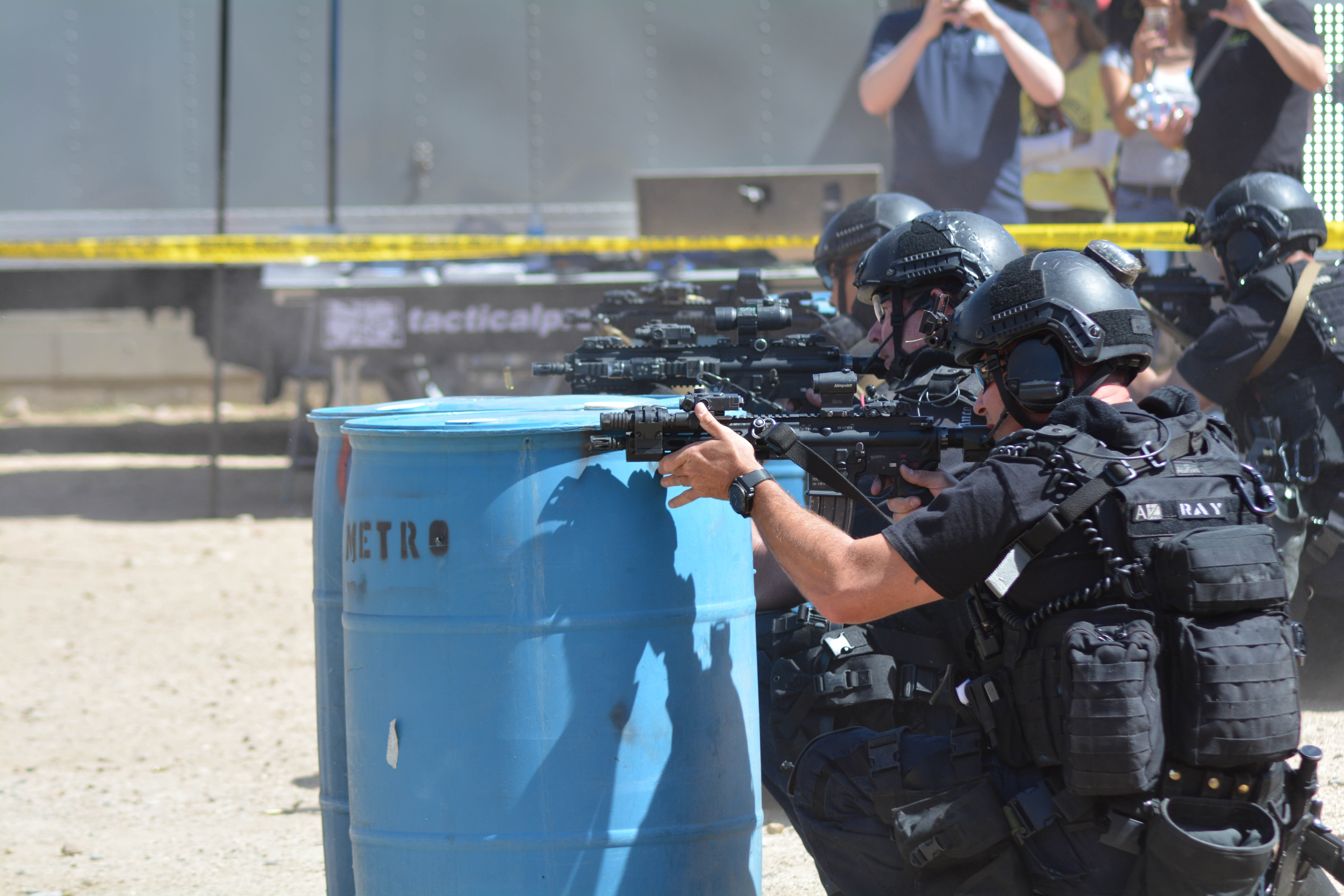

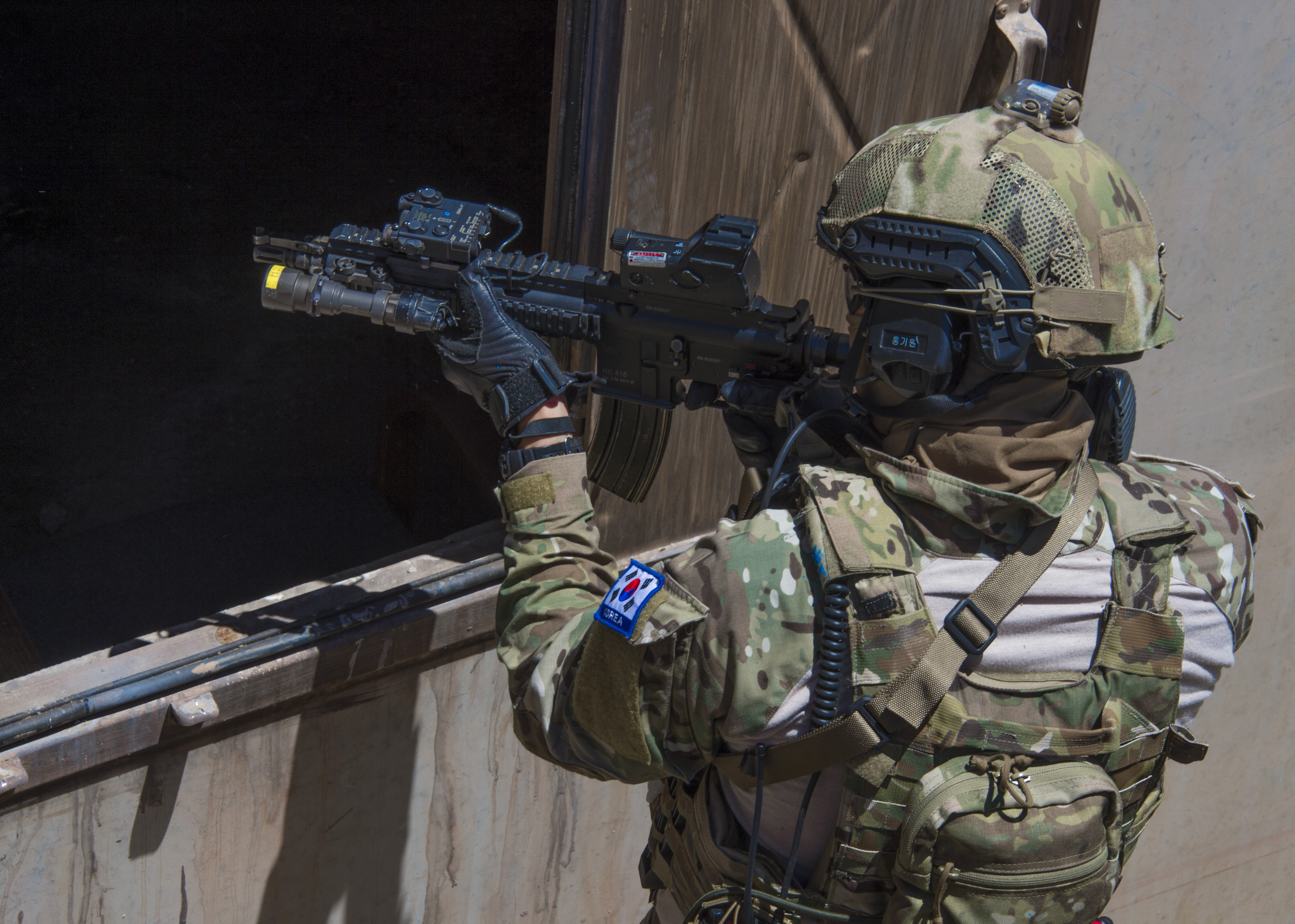

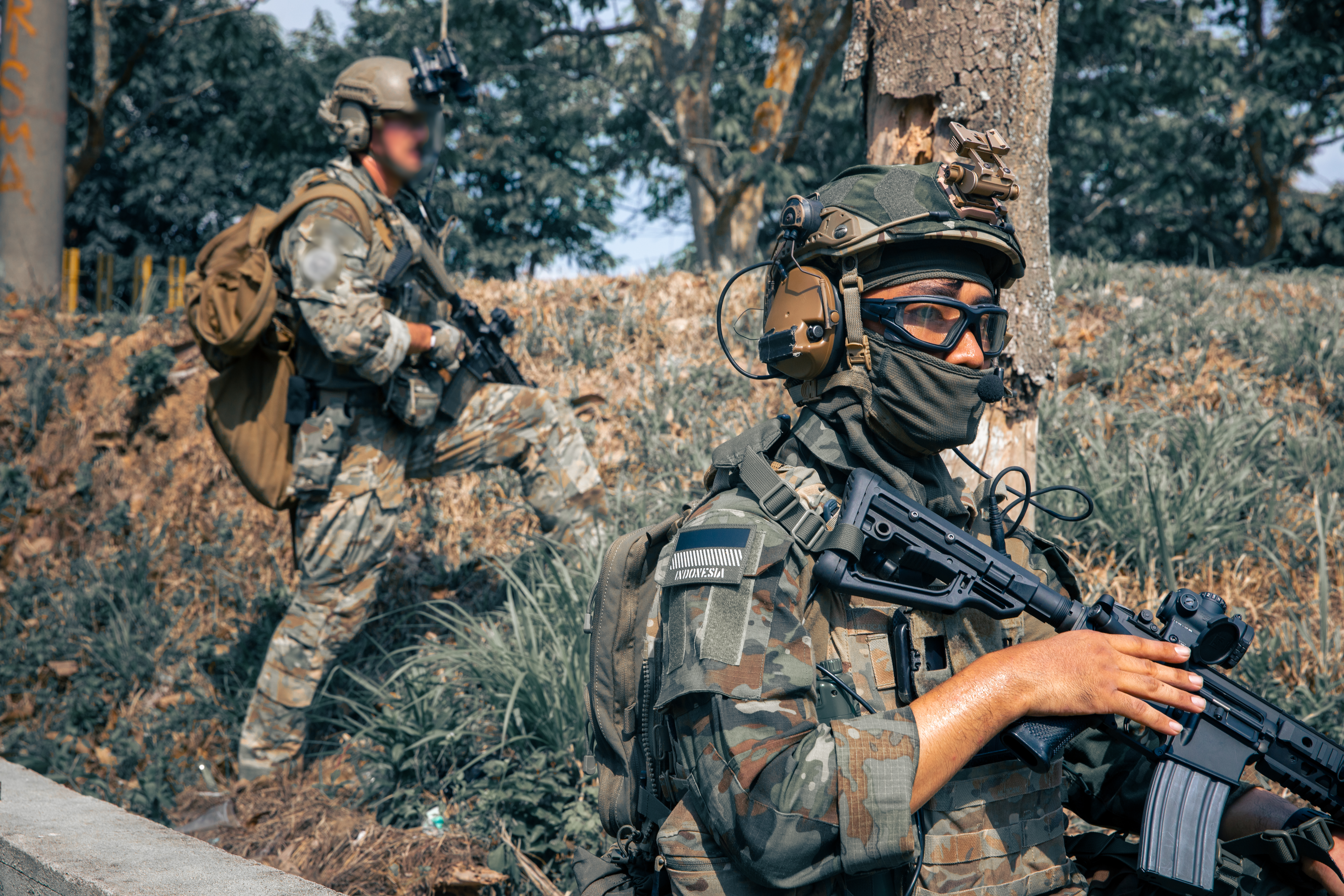

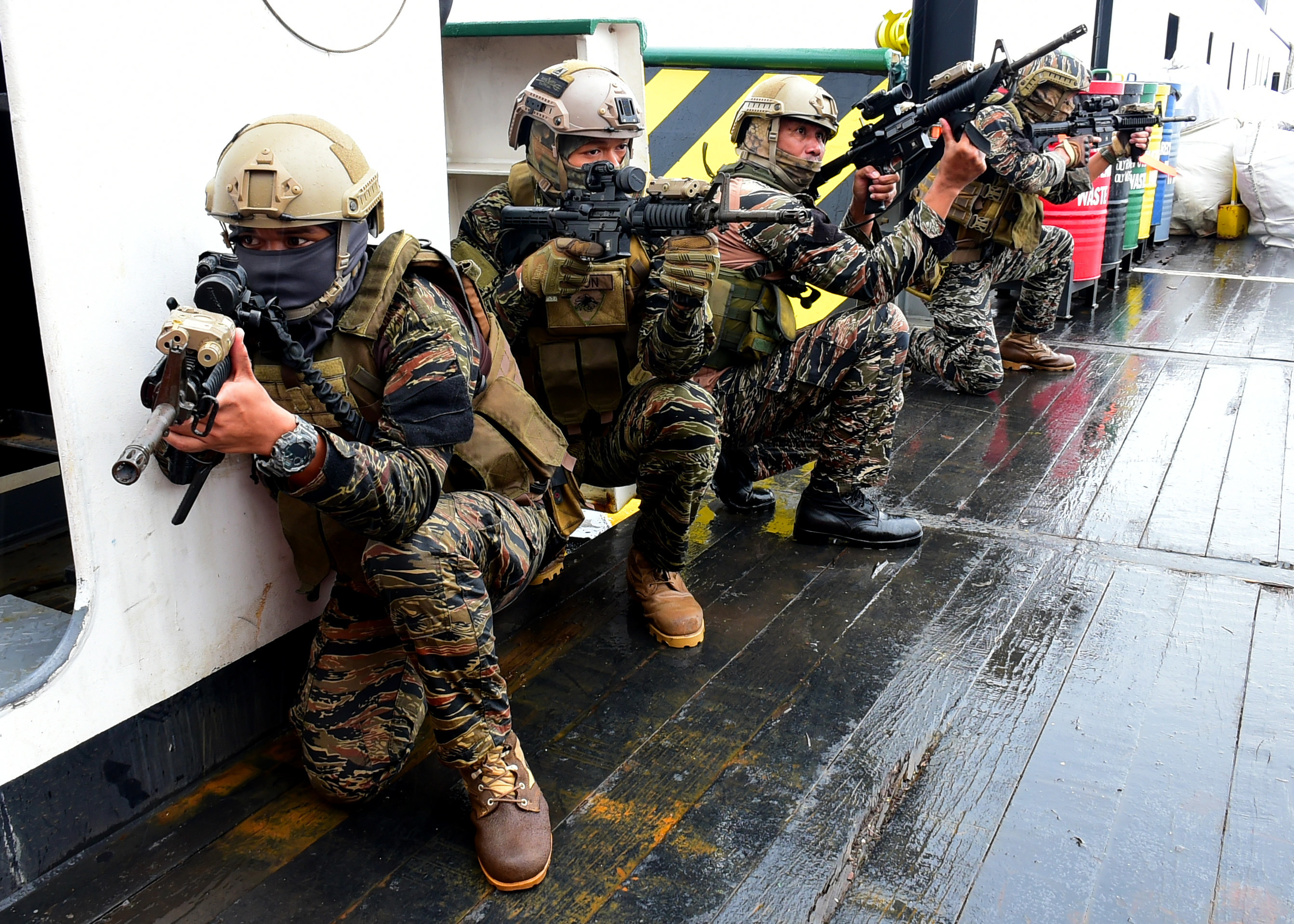

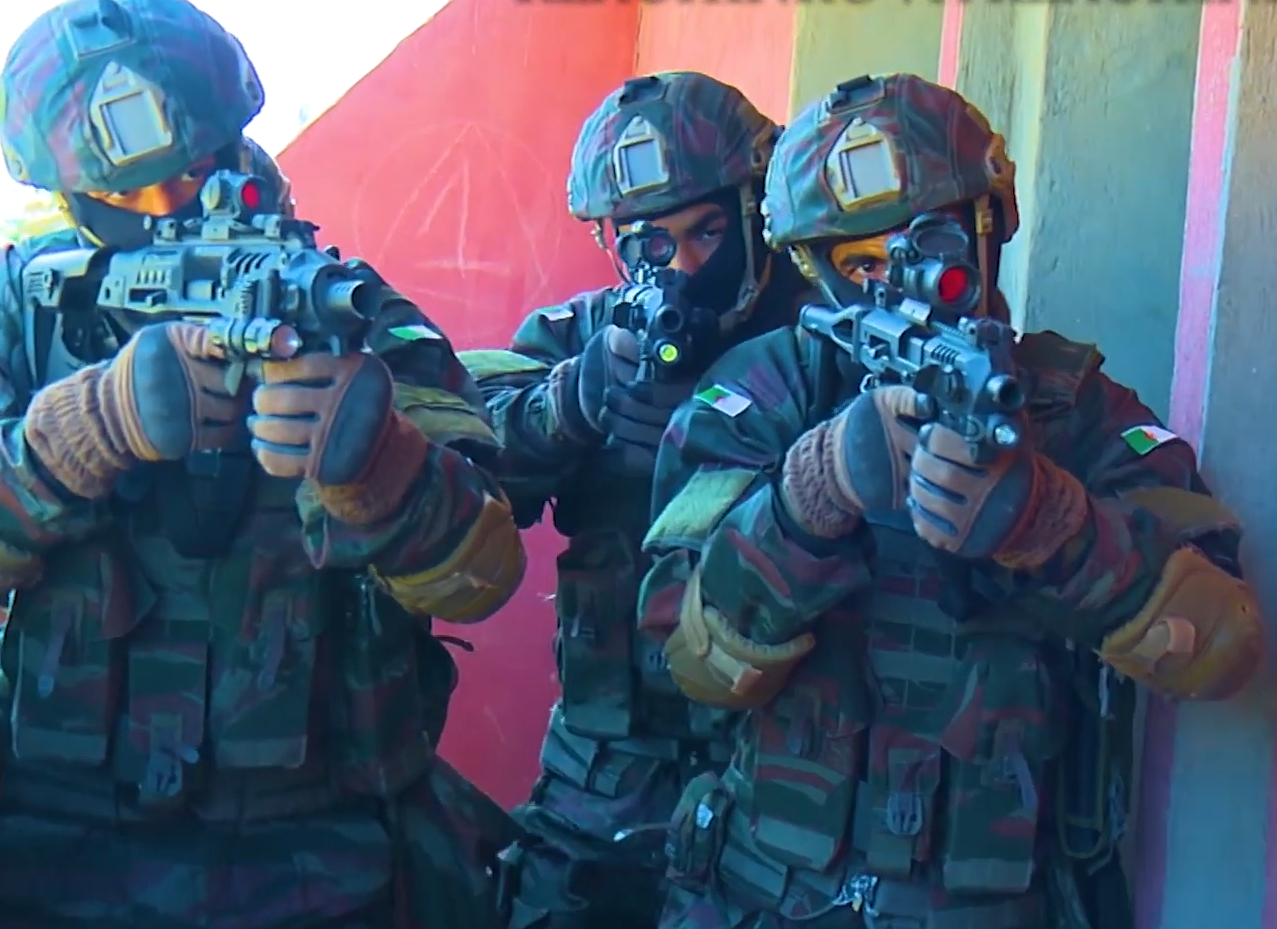

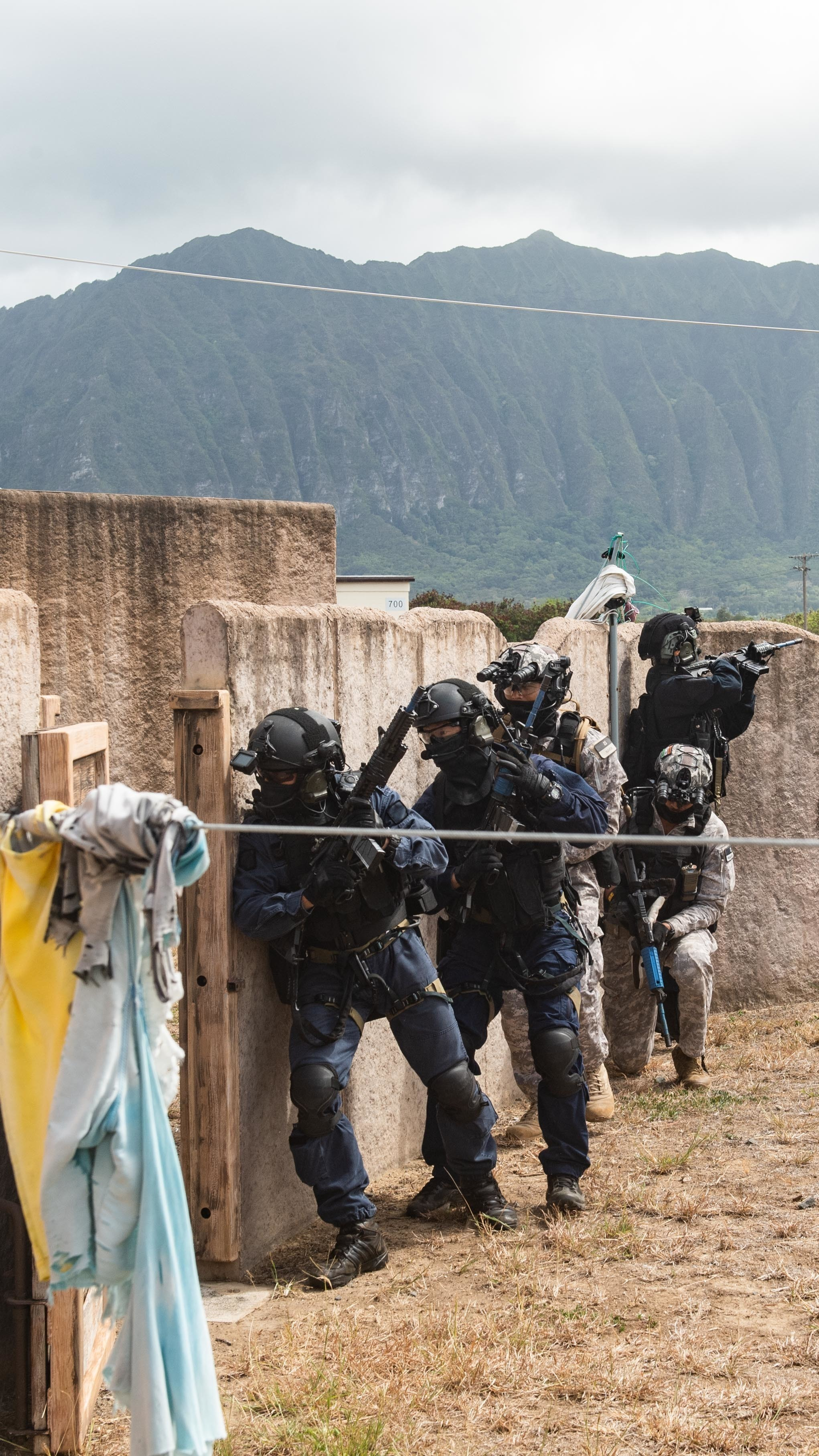

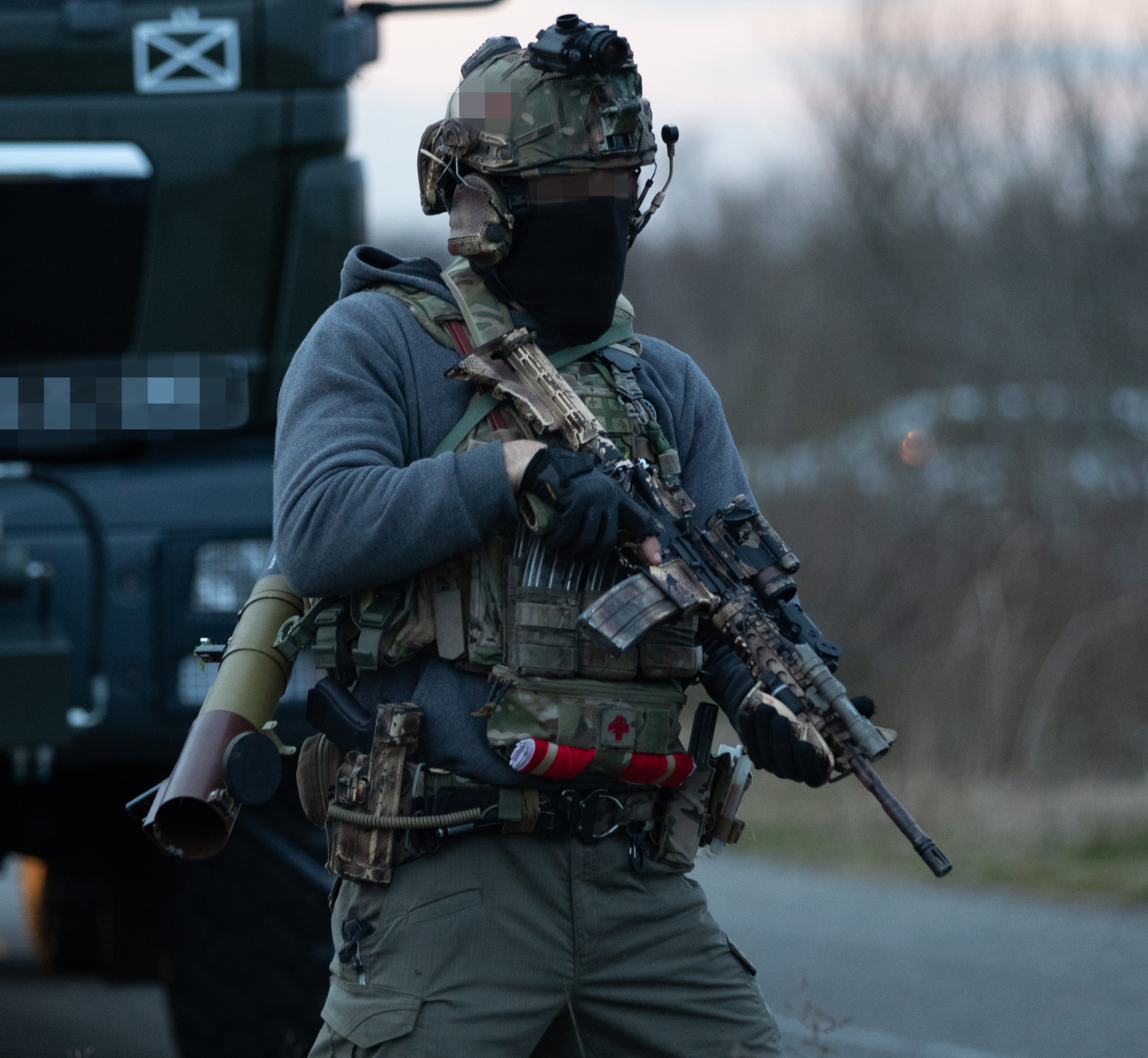

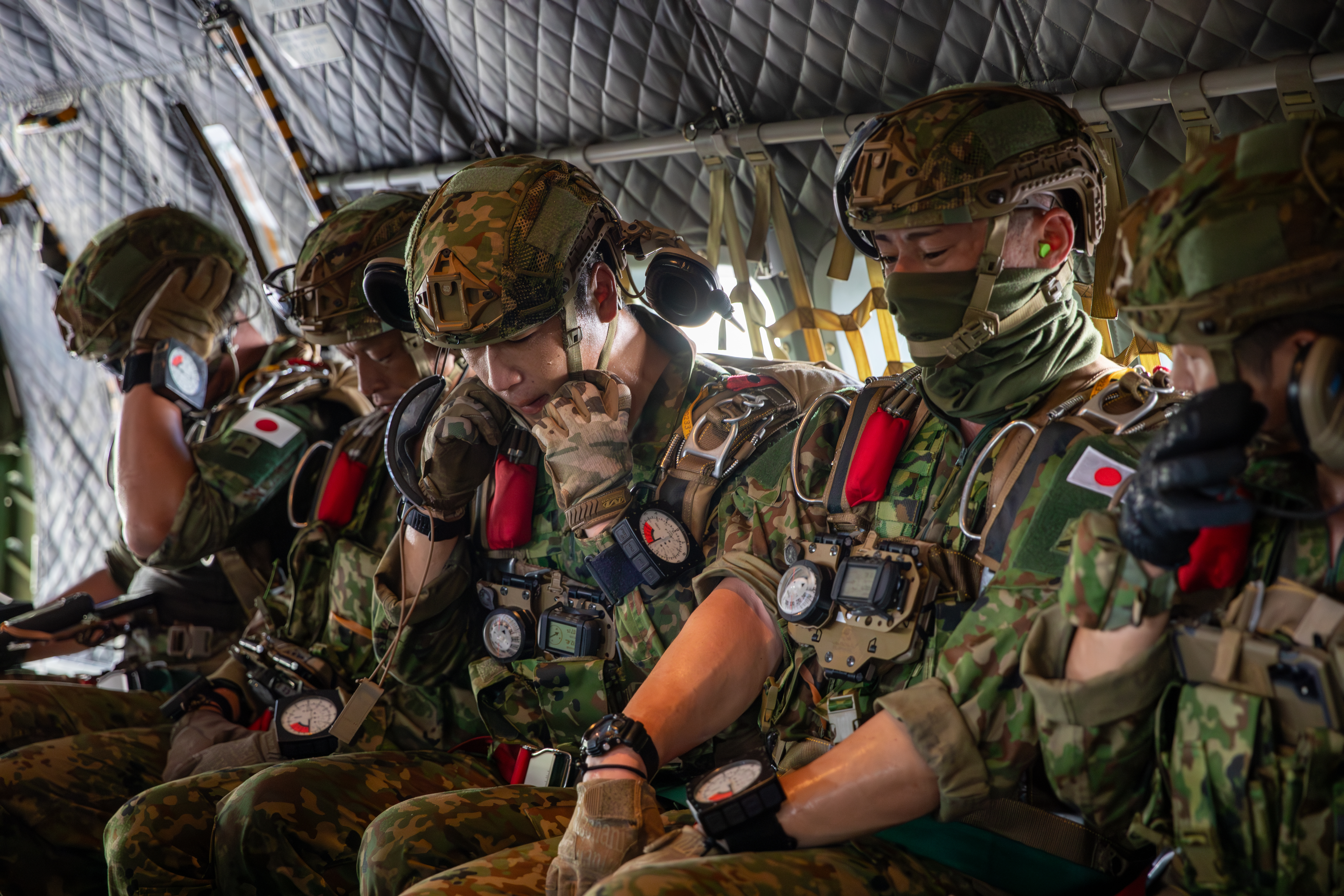

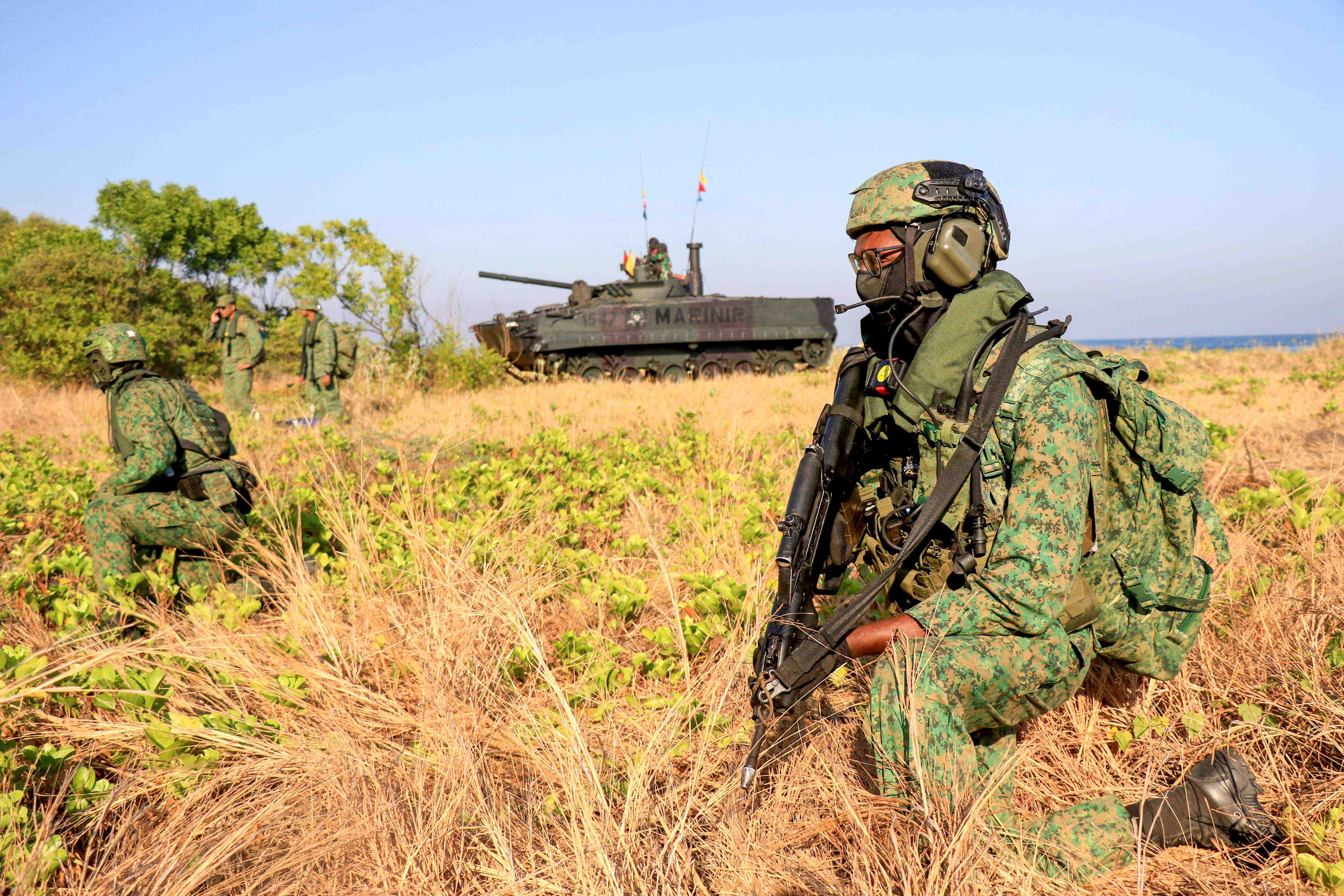
