= Colony Street-West Main Street Historic District =

Historic district in Connecticut, United States

- U.S. National Register of Historic Places
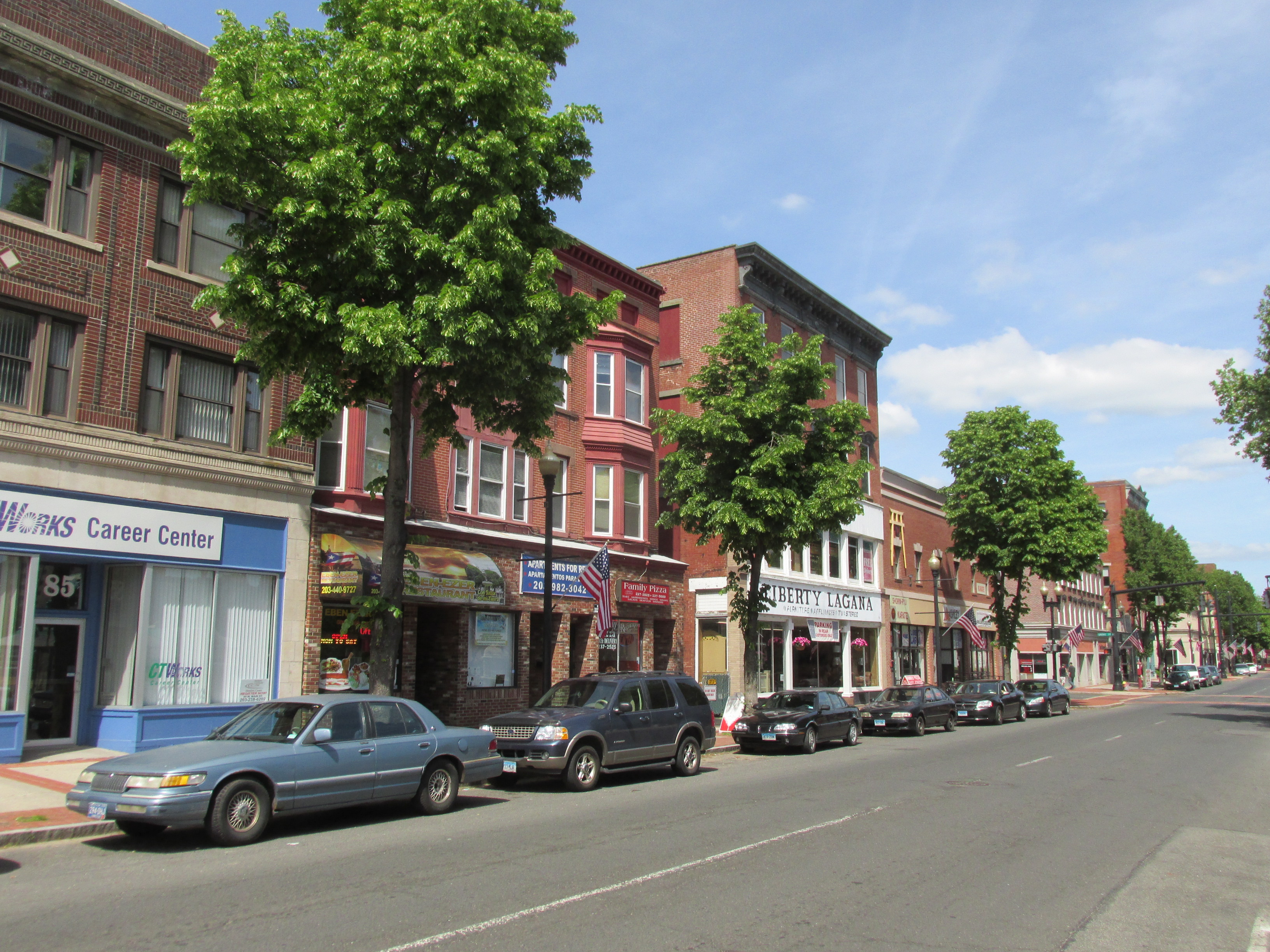
- West Main Street

- Location within Connecticut Location within the United States
- Location: 1-62 Colony, 55 Grove, 1-119 and 82-110 West Main Streets, Meriden, Connecticut
- Area: 11.5 acres (4.7 ha)
- Built by: Lines, H. Wales; Et al.
- Architectural style: Classical Revival, Art Deco, Italianate
- NRHP reference No.: 87001387
- Added to NRHP: September 4, 1987

The Colony Street-West Main Street Historic District encompasses a major section of the historic downtown area of Meriden, Connecticut. Extending north and west from the junction of Colony and West Main Streets, this area was developed commercially after the arrival of the railroad line which runs just to its east. Despite some redevelopment, the historic commercial and mixed residential-commercial buildings convey the appearance of a typical late 19th or early 20th-century downtown. The district was listed on the National Register of Historic Places in 1987. Since its listing, a number of the historic buildings have been demolished.

== Description and history ==
Colony St, Meriden, Connecticut, 1940s

Meriden's early town center was located at the junction of Main and Broad Streets, with West Meriden a lesser center of economic activity. In 1838, the railroad line was run nearer West Meriden (after a protracted battle between competing municipal interests), kicking off a commercial development boom there. Colony Street was by 1875 lined with commercial buildings, many of which were redeveloped later in the 19th century or early 20th century in late Victorian and other styles. West Main Street was developed mainly in the early 20th century, with either single or two-story commercial blocks, or larger mixed residential-commercial buildings in a diversity of styles. The south side of West Main Street was in the mid-20th century subjected to urban renewal, resulting in the demolition of most of the older buildings there.

The historic district extends west along West Main Street as far as the YMCA building and is limited to the north side except for a few buildings on the south side. The district extends north along Colony Street to the Gothic Revival First Congregational Church on the west side, and the former post office on the right. Much of the west side of the street has been redeveloped, while vacant lots now dot the landscape on the east side, where there once was an unbroken line of historic buildings.

== See also ==
- National Register of Historic Places listings in New Haven County, Connecticut
