= United States Post Office–Milford Main =

- US Post Office-Milford Main
- U.S. National Register of Historic Places
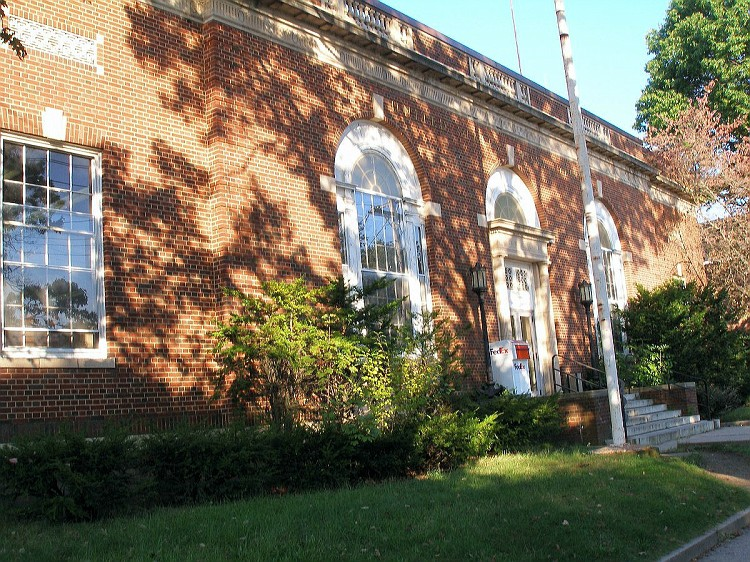

- Location within Connecticut Location within the United States
- Location: 6 West River Street, Milford, Connecticut
- Coordinates: 41°13′27″N 73°3′30″W
- Area: 0.8 acres (0.32 ha)
- Built: 1929
- Architect: Wetmore, James A.
- Architectural style: Colonial Revival, Georgian Revival
- NRHP reference No.: 86002959
- Added to NRHP: September 25, 1986

The U.S. Post Office-Milford Main, also known as Milford Main Post Office, is a historic post office building at 6 West River Street in Milford, Connecticut. It was designed by James A. Wetmore and completed in 1931. It is a fine local example of Classical Revival design, making a significant contribution to a cluster of civic buildings around a triangular park north of Milford's commercial district. The building was listed on the National Register of Historic Places in 1986.

== History ==
Milford's main post office occupies a prominent position, facing west toward the city's triangular green on West River Street. It makes a significant contribution to a cluster of civic buildings around a triangular park north of Milford's commercial district. The post office was designed by James A. Wetmore in 1929 and completed in 1931.

The building was listed on the National Register of Historic Places in September 25, 1986.

== Architecture ==
It is a fine local example of Classical Revival design. The single-story building is a rectangular structure, with a frame of steel and concrete which is faced in red brick and trimmed in limestone. It is covered by a shallow hip roof, which is obscured by a brick parapet above a limestone cornice. The main facade is five bays wide, with the three in the center projecting slightly. The outermost bays have large sash windows, while the outer ones of the projection are topped by half-round windows and have sidelights. The entry is in the center, also topped by a half-rond window, with the doorway framed by round columns and a modest entablature.

Its design is similar to a period post office in Newburyport, Massachusetts, but it is not known if a local architect was involved in its design. Its design was affected by the terms of the 1926 Public Buildings Act, which dictated economic use of materials and harmonization with surrounding structures, which in this case would have included Milford City Hall (completed in 1919 at the north end of the green), but not the adjacent neoclassical state courthouse (not completed until 1936).

== See also ==
- National Register of Historic Places listings in New Haven County, Connecticut
- List of United States post offices
