= Gentex (military contractor) =

American manufacturer of military equipment

- Formerly: Klots Throwing Company, General Textile Mills
- Founded: 1894 in Carbondale, Pennsylvania
- Headquarters: United States
- Website: https://www.gentexcorp.com/

Gentex Corporation is a privately held America-based company that manufactures personal protective equipment, aluminized fabrics, Lifetex fabrics, Clearweld, Filtron, and Precision Polymer Processors for military, special forces, commercial, law enforcement, emergency medical services and first responders.

The company was founded in 1894 in Carbondale, Pennsylvania, initially as a silk manufacturer. Over the years, it evolved into a specialized manufacturer of personal protective equipment (PPE) and communication systems.

== History ==
=== Klots Throwing Company, 1894–1931 ===
The Gentex Corporation began operation as the Klots Throwing Company in Carbondale, Pennsylvania in the late 19th century. Initially located in New York, the silk throwing plant owned by Henry Durrell Klots burned down in 1894. After the fire, Marcus Frieder, bookkeeper for Klots, suggested building in Carbondale to use the untapped workforce of wives and daughters of local coal miners. Henry Klots agreed and named Frieder manager of the new plant and eventually, secretary and general manager of the company. Frieder became president upon the death of Henry Klots in 1914. During World War I, Klots manufactured silk cartridge bags under the direction of President Frieder. However, Rayon was introduced as an alternative to silk in the 1920s, and by the beginning of the Great Depression, the company was forced into bankruptcy.

=== General Textile Mills, 1932–1957 ===
In 1932, Marcus and his son Leonard bought and reorganized Klots, renaming it the General Textile Mills. The Frieders built and purchased several more throwing mills in Maryland, Virginia, West Virginia, and Pennsylvania, making it one of the largest organizations in the silk industry. The Klots Throwing Company Mill at Cumberland, Maryland was listed on the National Register of Historic Places in 2010. The mill at Lonaconing, Maryland operated from 1907 to 1957. By the time Marcus died in 1940 and Leonard assumed the Presidency, the company's ability to weave quality textiles had led to the creation of entirely new and more sophisticated technologies for use in alternative applications.

Upon the entry of the United States into World War II, the company began manufacturing parachutes for the U.S. military. Eventually, it became one of the largest manufacturers of parachutes in the country, producing parachutes for cargo and carrier pigeons, as well as a special aluminized option that could reflect radar. In August 1945, General Textile Mills was awarded the Army-Navy 'E' Award for excellence in wartime production.

During that same period, General Textile Mills began manufacturing its own composite-structure parachute boxes from fiberglass mat impregnated with a polyester resin that would protect packaged parachutes. Following the war, the government approached General Textile Mills to determine the feasibility of using the same composite-structure to manufacture pilot helmets. Due to the advancements in aircraft technology, improved protective headgear was warranted to replace the cloth or leather options used prior to 1948.

General Textile Mills produced its first hard shell helmet using the parachute box technology that same year. The helmet, known as the H-1, was made for the U.S. Navy and the P-1 soon followed for the U.S. Air Force. These technologies were quickly incorporated into helicopter pilot helmets for both military and commercial applications, as well as tank crew helmets.

=== Gentex, 1958–present ===
In 1958, General Textile Mills shortened its name to Gentex. The company continued working to improve and adapt the helmet technology.

Significant advancements in the aircraft industry resulted in the need for oxygen-breathing equipment for life support. In 1969, the Frieders bought Protection, Inc., a helmet manufacturer in Pomona, California. Ten years later, Protection Inc. began to acquire equipment in order to manufacture respiratory products. By 1981, the new branch officially transitioned into Gentex Western Operations focusing on the manufacture of respiratory products. The California operation moved to Rancho Cucamonga in 1992.

In 1972, the company lost their leader of more than 30 years when Leonard P. Frieder Sr. died, leaving his son L. Peter Frieder Jr. to assume the presidency.

Under the direction of the younger Frieder, the company began addressing the need for low-noise, high clarity communications systems for helmets. Gentex bought the Derry, New Hampshire based JMR Systems Corporation in 1977. As a result of this acquisition, Gentex was able to expand its capabilities to include the manufacture of electro-acoustic products. The New Hampshire operation moved to Manchester in 2006.

The creation of the respiratory and electro-acoustic products business units, along with the existing helmet systems division and a group dedicated to the advancement of materials, resulted in the company's ability to produce totally integrated systems for tactical applications. The first production of Gentex ballistic helmet PASGT began during Operation Urgent Fury in 1983 and replaced the Vietnam era M1 steel helmet. By 1987, Gentex was made SPH-4 aviation helmets for the United States Army, which eventually became an industry standard globally.

Old logo

In 2005 Gentex opened a new R&D facility located in Aurora, Illinois. The Visionix business unit specializes in development of helmet mounted information display systems. Gentex Visionix, in partnership with Raytheon Technical Services, is under contract to supply the Gentex-developed Scorpion Helmet Mounted Cueing System to the U.S. Air Force.

== About ==
=== Scope of work ===
Gentex Corporation works closely with international distributors to provide products to international armed forces, and U.S. commercial distributors. Additionally, the company is called upon for specialized projects that require customization of personal protective products for NASA programs, such as the early Space Shuttle missions, and commercial projects, such as Burt Rutan's Scaled Composites and SpaceShipOne repeated launch as part of the race for the Ansari X Prize.

The company holds active industry memberships in such organizations the U.S. Navy League; SAFE Association; National Defense Industrial Manufacturers Association; and Society of Experimental Test Pilots (SETP), which features such distinguished members as Buzz Aldrin, John Glenn and Wally Schirra, and where Gentex presents the annual Tony LeVier Flight Test Safety Award.

The corporation is also past recipient awards from the Defense Logistics Agency (DLA), Philadelphia, Pennsylvania; and the Ben Franklin Technology Partners (BFTP) Innovation Award, Harrisburg and Bethlehem, Pennsylvania.

=== Community involvement ===
Gentex is also a member of the Greater Scranton Chamber of Commerce, Scranton, Pennsylvania; Greater Carbondale Chamber of Commerce, Carbondale, Pennsylvania; Manchester Chamber of Commerce, Manchester, New Hampshire; Greater Derry Chamber of Commerce, Derry, New Hampshire; Inland Empire Economic Partnership, Rancho Cucamonga, California; and Rancho Cucamonga Chamber of Commerce, Rancho Cucamonga, California.

The workforce of approximately 1000 employees, also is focused on the support of local, regional and national community organizations and programs. Gentex Corporation annually recognizes and supports the exceptional work of the charities and non-profit organizations prevalent in the communities where its employees live, work and play. Support includes volunteer efforts by employees and in-kind and monetary contributions. The American Red Cross, United Way, YMCA, Pennsylvania Special Olympics, Ronald McDonald House of Scranton and Pennsylvania's Adopt-A-Highway Program are just a few of the organizations which continually benefit.

== Acquisitions ==
InterSense, which specialized in helmet-mounted displays, was purchased by the company in November 2011.

In January 2012, the company acquired Ops-Core, creator of the Future Assault Shell Technology helmet. In 2014, Gentex Europe acquired Helmet Integrated Systems Ltd in Stranraer, Scotland, UK, a manufacturer of military pilot and emergency services helmets.

The company purchased Voxx International for a reported $175M in April 2025, and in November of that year, the Toronto-based company BioConnect was acquired.
