= United States Post Office (Westport, Connecticut) =

- United States Post Office, Westport, Connecticut
- U.S. National Register of Historic Places
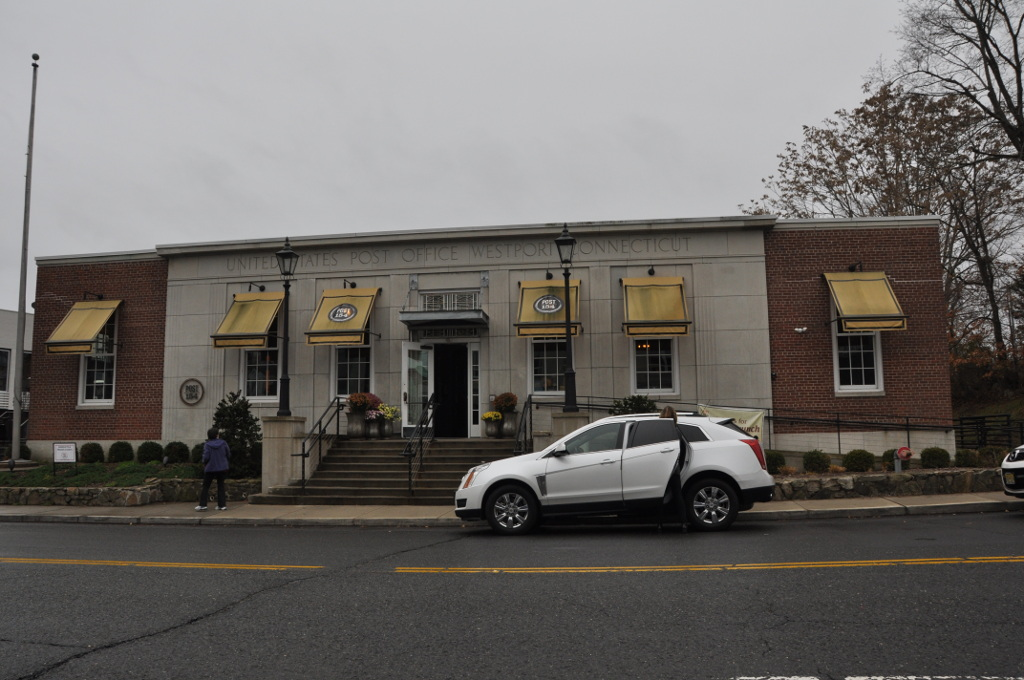
- Westport Post Office

- Location within Connecticut Location within the United States
- Location: 154 Post Road East, Westport, Connecticut
- Coordinates: 41°08′28.44″N 73°21′35.34″W
- Built: 1935
- Architect: Holden, Lansing C.
- Architectural style: Classical Revival, Art Deco
- NRHP reference No.: 12000001
- Added to NRHP: April 3, 2012

The former United States Post Office in Westport, Connecticut is a historic post office building at 154 Post Road East in Westport, Connecticut. The building, built in 1935, is located in Downtown Westport. It was listed on the National Register of Historic Places in 2012.

The building was sold to a private consortium for $2.35 million in May 2011. In August 2013, the building reopened as a restaurant called Post 154. The restaurant, which featured a postal theme, closed in 2016. Since 2017, the building has housed an outlet of the furniture chain Design Within Reach, a retail subsidiary of Herman Miller.

== See also ==
- National Register of Historic Places listings in Fairfield County, Connecticut
- List of United States post offices
