= United States Post Office–Meriden Main =

Historic post office in Meriden, Connecticut

- US Post Office-Meriden Main
- U.S. National Register of Historic Places
- U.S. Historic district – Contributing property
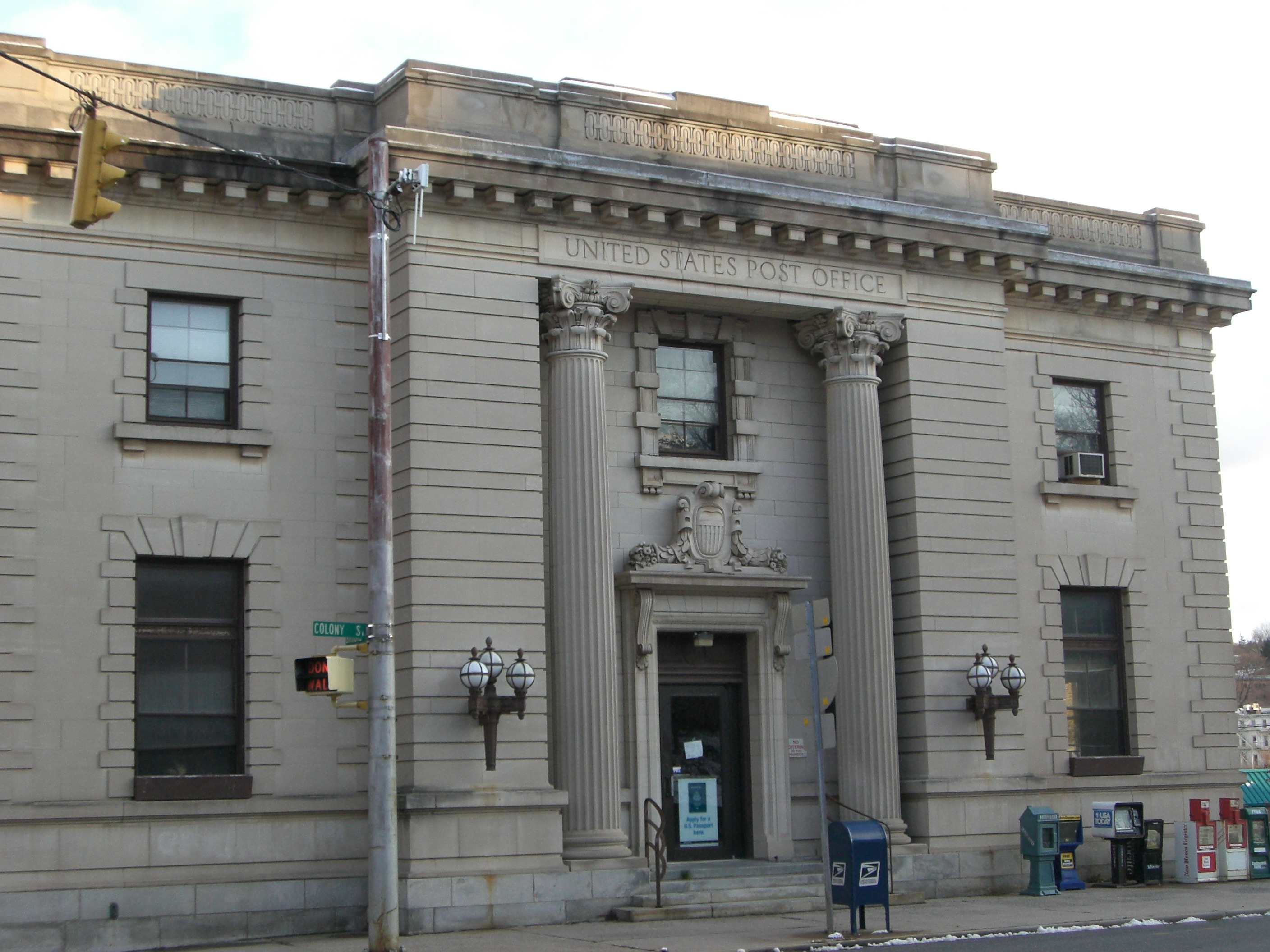

- Location within Connecticut Location within the United States
- Location: 89 North Colony Street, Meriden, Connecticut
- Coordinates: 41°32′25″N 72°48′03″W
- Area: 0.7 acres (0.28 ha)
- Built: 1907
- Architect: Taylor, James Knox; Wetmore, James A.
- Architectural style: Beaux Arts
- Part of: Colony Street-West Main Street Historic District (ID87001387)
- NRHP reference No.: 86000129

Significant dates
- Added to NRHP: January 21, 1986
- Designated CP: September 4, 1987

The former U.S. Post Office-Meriden Main, also known as Meriden Main Post Office, is located at 89 North Colony Street in Meriden, Connecticut. Built in 1907 and extended in 1932, it is a striking local example of Beaux Arts architecture. The building was listed on the National Register of Historic Places in 1986.

== History ==
Meriden's former post office is located on the east side of North Colony Street on the northern fringe of downtown Meriden, at the southeast corner of Brooks Street.

Construction of the building was authorized by Congress in 1907, and the building was completed in 1909 to a design by James Knox Taylor. It no longer houses the city's main post office, which is at 190 Center Street.

It was vacant at the time of its listing on the National Register of Historic Places in January 21, 1986. It is also a contributing property to Colony Street-West Main Street Historic District

== Architecture ==
The building is a striking local example of Beaux Arts architecture, and one of the city's finest architectural landmarks. It is a two-story masonry structure, with a steel frame set on a granite foundation, with walls finished in rusticated and dressed limestone, The main facade is three bays wide, with a projecting center bay housing the entrance, flanked by tall fluted Corinthian columns. Windows on two levels are articulated by quoin blocks, and the entrance has an elaborate cornice with medallion. The building is crowned by a modillioned cornice and stone parapet. The interior lobby space features terrazzo marble flooring and heavy woodwork, with walls adorned by murals depicting Meriden's historic cites.

In 1932 a sympathetic addition was made to the rear by James A. Wetmore.

== See also ==
- National Register of Historic Places listings in New Haven County, Connecticut
- List of United States post offices
