= Gentex (standard) =

International standard for the transmission of telegrams over the Telex network

Gentex is an international standard (ITU F.20) for the transmission of telegrams over the Telex network. It replaces fixed telegraph connections between stations and means instead that the telegraph station that transmits the telegram connects directly to the receiving station and transmits the telegram with a remote typewriter.

The first official Gentex traffic was introduced in 1956 between the Netherlands, Switzerland, West Germany and Austria. Sweden introduced in 1960 as a test Gentexexpedition with the Netherlands. In 1963 the Nordic countries decided to introduce Gentexexpedition between their countries.
