= Lansing Colton Holden Jr. =

American World War I flying ace, architect, illustrator and film director

Lansing Colton Holden, Jr.
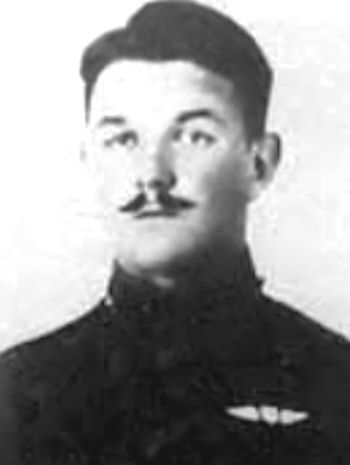
- Lansing Colton Holden, Jr., 1918
- Born: October 8, 1896; Brooklyn, New York City, USA
- Died: November 13, 1938 (aged 42); Vicinity of Sparta, Tennessee, USA
- Spouse: Edith Gillingham
- Children: Lansing Colton Holden III. Penelope Lancaster Holden
- Military career
- Allegiance: France; United States
- Branch: Aéronautique Militaire (France); Air Service, United States Army
- Rank: Lieutenant
- Nickname: Denny
- Units: Aéronautique Militaire: Escadrille N.461; Air Service, United States Army: 95th Aero Squadron; Escadrille Cherifienne
- Conflicts: World War I Rif War
- Awards: Distinguished Service Cross with Oak Leaf Cluster, French Legion d'Honneur
- Other work: Flew for French during Rif War in 1925

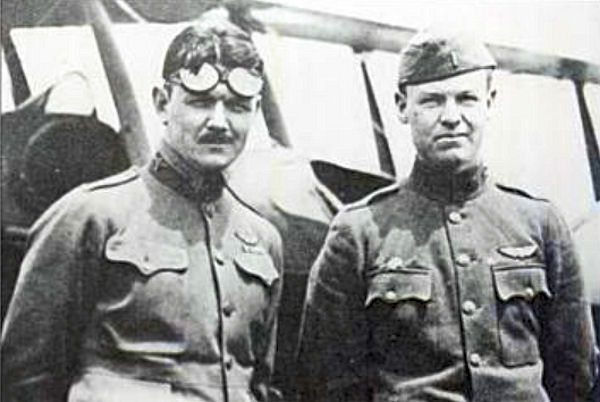
Two American World War I aces, Lieutenants Lansing Holden (95th Aero Squadron, Left) and Zenos R. Miller (27th Aero Squadron) Miller became an ace the same day he was shot down and became POW, 30 July 1918

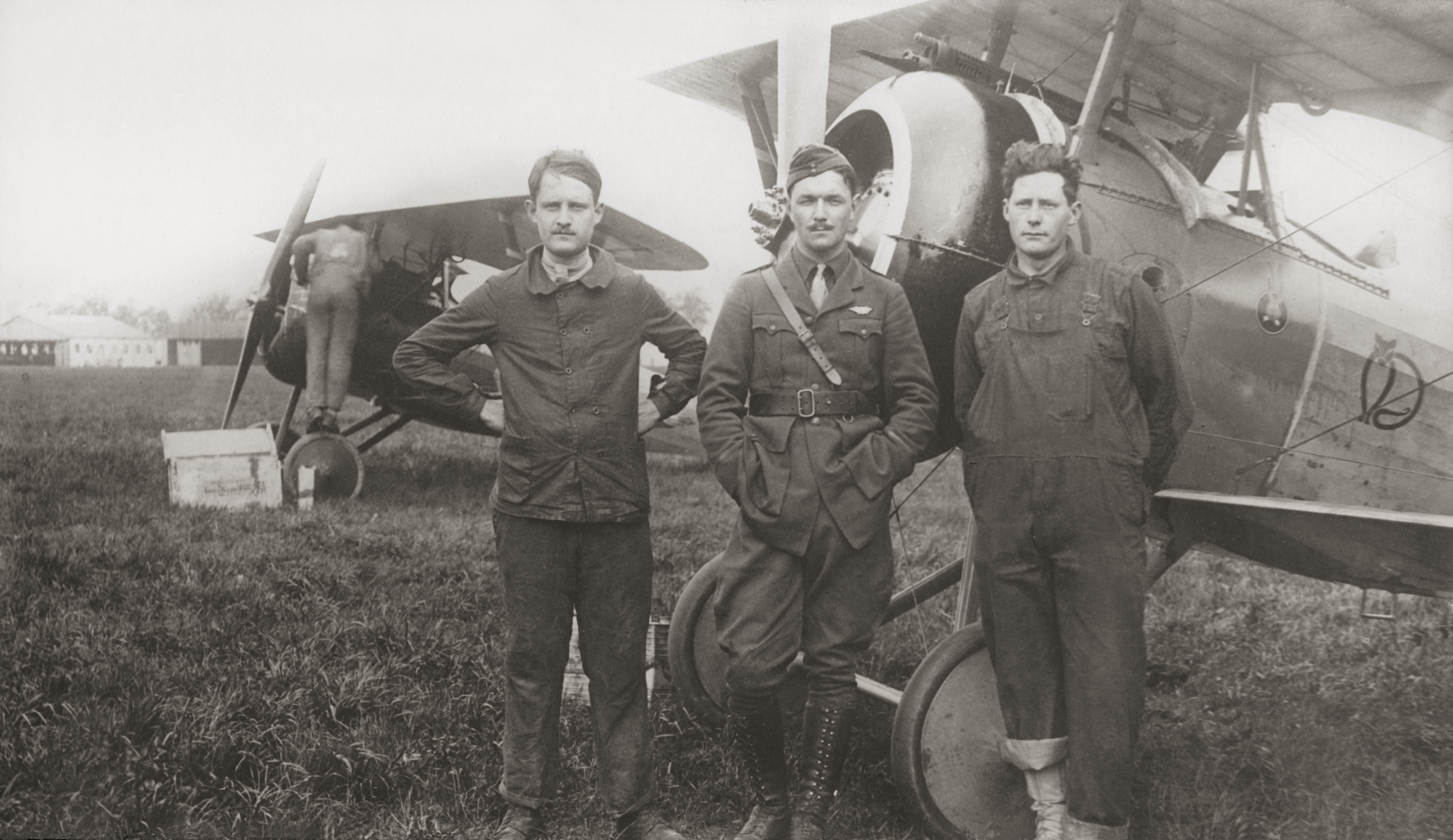
Lansing C. Holden, Jr. (Denny) with mechanics. April–May 1918. Le Bourget, France. Escadrille 471.

Lieutenant Lansing Colton Holden, Jr. (October 8, 1896 – November 13, 1938) was a World War I flying ace credited with seven aerial victories. He was an architect, illustrator, and American film director.

== Early life ==
Lansing "Denny" C. Holden, Jr. was born in New York City, son of Lansing C. Holden and Mrs. Edith Rogers Holden. His father was a prominent architect and president of the Engineering Society in New York for many years. After graduating The Hill School in 1915, he entered Princeton University. At Princeton he was a member of the Flying Corps along with other notable pilots Elliot Springs and George Vaughn.

== World War I service ==
Holden left Princeton and went to France to join the fight. He was originally attached to French aviation's Escadrille 461 in April 1918 to defend Paris against German air attack. He then transferred to the 95th Aero Squadron in July as a Spad XIII pilot. He survived being shot down on 10 August before he scored his first victory on 29 September 1918. After destroying that German observation balloon, it would take him almost a month to score again; on 23 October, Holden teamed with Edward Peck Curtis to down a Fokker D.VII at 1630 hours, and then shot down another balloon solo. Four days later, Holden shot down a Hannover CL. He turned balloon buster again for his last three victories, on 30 October and 3 and 4 November 1918.

== Postwar life ==
At the end of the war Holden returned to Princeton University '19 specializing in fine arts and taking a graduate course in architecture. He pursued architecture at Harvard and won the American Field Service Scholarship for study at the École des Beaux-Arts and moved to France where he completed his architectural studies. In 1924 he married Edith H. Gillingham of Philadelphia, in Paris. The following year, he took up arms again, serving as a captain during the Rif War in Morocco, and winning the Légion d'honneur. and the Croix de Guerre, with palm, by the French Government. He was also decorated by the Spanish Government with the Order of the Moroccan Peace. He returned to New York to begin his architectural career.

In 1932, Merian C. Cooper, a fellow pilot, invited Holden to Hollywood to work on movies, notably with She (1935) as Director, What Every Woman Wants (1934) as associate art director, The Garden of Allah (1936) as color designer, A Star Is Born (1937) as Production Designer, and Pow Wow (1938) as Director. Holden illustrated an unofficial history of the 95th Aero called Squadron 95, written by fellow squadron member Harold Robert Buckley in 1933 The book has been in publication as recently as 1972.

He then returned to New York. He became an officer in the 102nd Observation Squadron, 27th Division, New York National Guard. On 13 November 1938, while attempting a landing in dodgy weather, he crashed to his death near Sparta, Tennessee.

== Honors and awards ==
Text of citation for the Distinguished Service Cross (DSC), as promulgated in General Orders No. 46, War Department, 1919:

The Distinguished Service Cross is presented to Lansing Colton Holden, Jr., First Lieutenant (Air Service), U.S. Army, for extraordinary heroism in action near Montigny, France, October 23, 1918. Lieutenant Holden was ordered to attack several German balloons, reported to be regulating effective artillery fire on our troops. After driving off an enemy plane, encountered before reaching the balloons, he soon came upon five balloons in ascension one kilometer apart. In attacking the first, which proved to be a decoy with a basket, his guns jammed; after clearing them he attacked the second balloon, forcing the observer to jump. His guns again jammed before he could set fire to this balloon. Moving on the third balloon at a height of only 50 meters, he set fire to it and compelled the observer to jump. He was prevented from attacking the two remaining balloons by the further jamming of his machine gun.

Text of citation for the Oak Leaf Cluster for the Distinguished Service Cross (DSC) as promulgated in General Orders No. 46, War Department, 1919:

The Distinguished Service Cross is presented to Lansing Colton Holden, Jr., First Lieutenant (Air Service), U.S. Army, for extraordinary heroism in action near St. Jean de Buzy, France, November 4, 1918. Flying at a low altitude to evade hostile pursuit patrols, Lieutenant Holden attacked a German observation balloon in the face of antiaircraft and machine-gun fire. Although the balloon was being rapidly pulled own, he set fire to it in its nest and also caused much damage to adjacent buildings.

== See also ==
- List of World War I flying aces from the United States
