= Lansing C. Holden =

American architect

Lansing Colton Holden Sr.
- Born: May 2, 1858; Rome, New York, U.S.
- Died: May 15, 1930 (aged 72); Carmel, New York, U.S.
- Education: College of Wooster
- Occupation: Architect

Lansing Colton Holden Sr. (March 2, 1858 – May 15, 1930) was an American architect of the late 19th and early 20th centuries with several works in Scranton, Pennsylvania. He was also involved in architecture for refrigeration.

== Biography ==
Holden was born in 1858 in Rome, New York. His father owned a marble yard in Utica, New York, where he attended public schools. He later attended College of Wooster, at which his brother, Louis E. Holden, later would serve as president. He worked under architect Issac G. Perry, who designed the First Presbyterian Church in Ossining, New York. He also worked with Mills & Greenleaf.

From 1908 until his death he was president of the Bronx Refrigerating Company and of the Tri-Boro Refrigerating Company.

Holden was elected a fellow of the American Institute of Architects in 1912. He served on many committees and was largely responsible for its code of ethics in its present form, and served as president of the New York Chapter. He was a member of the Board of Examiners of the City of New York in 1916, a member of the Board of Standards and Appeals in 1916 – 18, and a director of the Engineers Club.

He had served as the architect of the Delaware-Lackawanna Railroad.

His son, Lansing Colton Holden Jr. was an aviator. His grandson, Lansing C. Holden III, worked as a writer.

Holden died at his summer home at Kent Cliffs in Carmel, New York on May 15, 1930.

== Works ==
Holden designed a variety of buildings, some of which have been listed on the National Register of Historic Places (NRHP). It is believed that he also designed several textile mill buildings in New England but no record of these has been found.

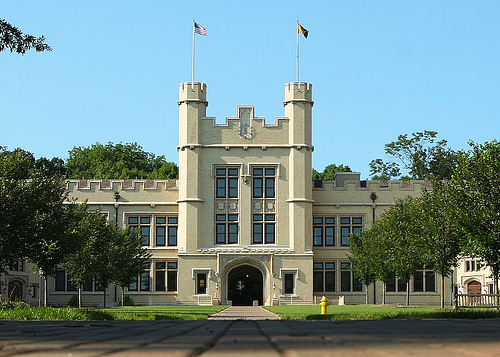
Kauke Hall, College of Wooster

(NRHP)

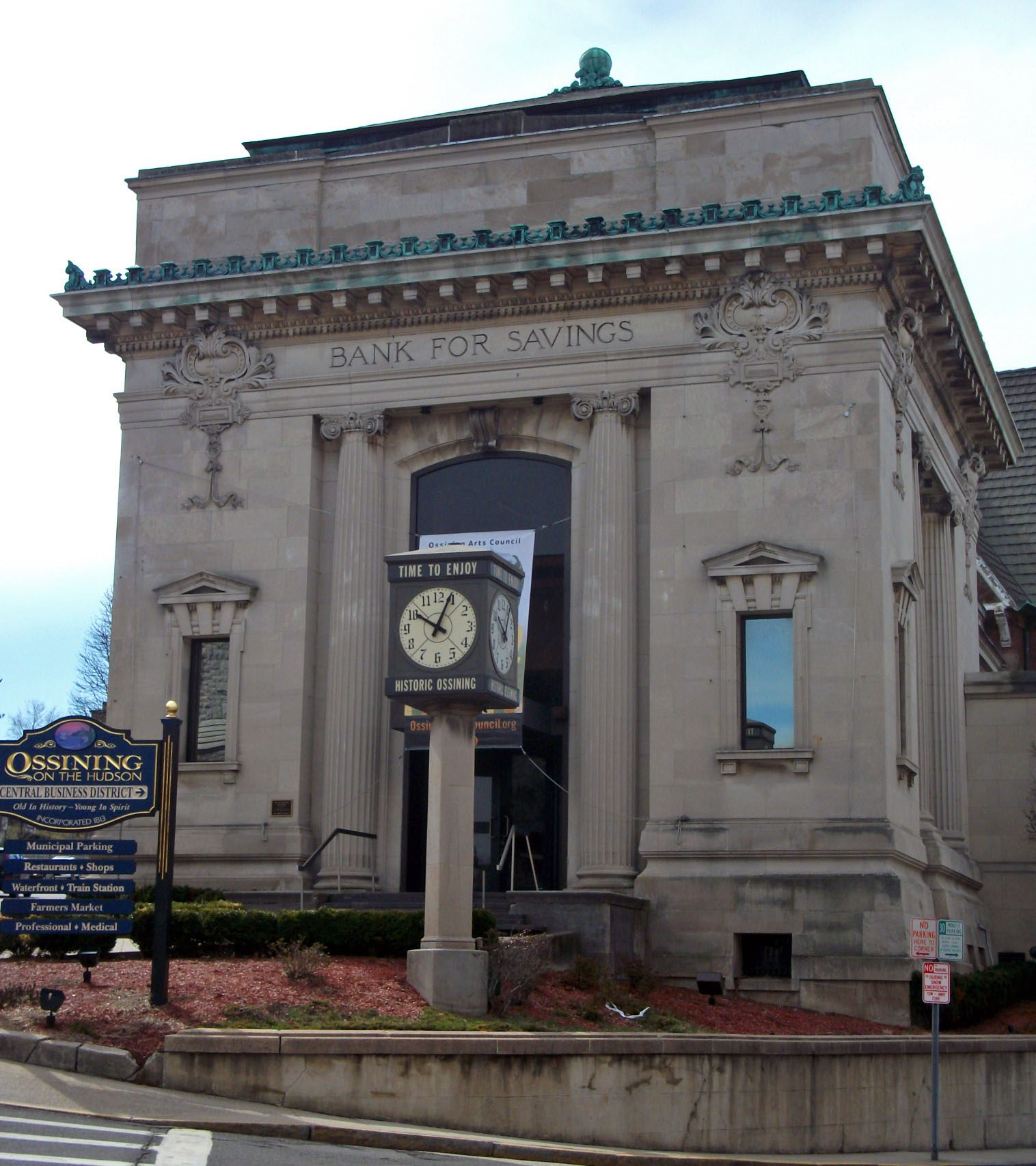
Bank for Savings, Ossining

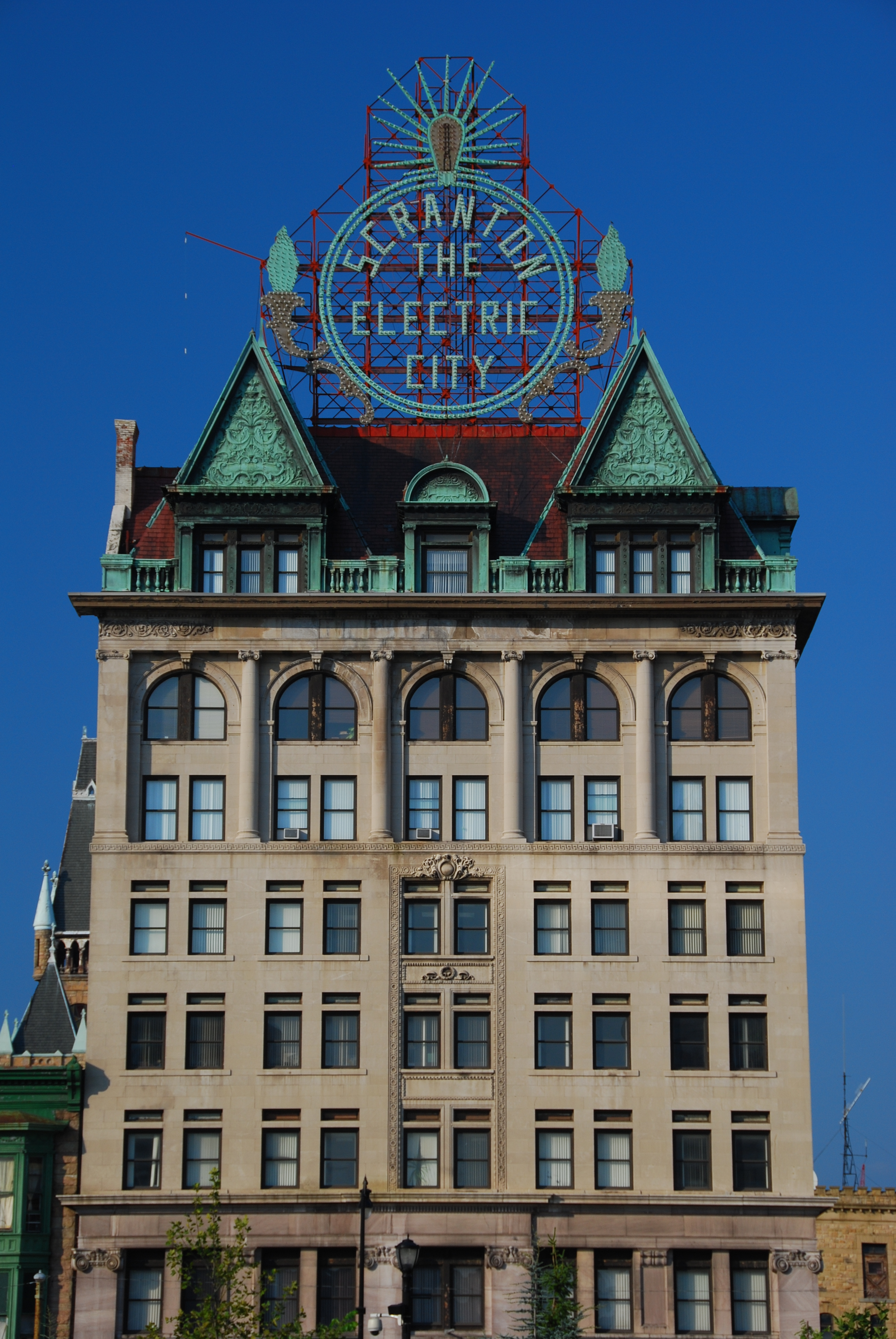
Scranton Electric Building

- 1887-1892: Greene Avenue Baptist Church, now the Antioch Baptist Church (1887-1892), Bedford–Stuyvesant, Brooklyn

Designed in association with Paul F. Higgs in a mixed Romanesque Revival/Queen Anne style

- 1890, Townhouse, Bedford–Stuyvesant, Brooklyn.
- 1894-1896: Connell Building, Scranton, Pennsylvania
- 1895: Watkins-Maxey House, later the Hebrew Day School, Scranton, Pennsylvania demolished and removed from NRHP
- 1896: Scranton Electric Building (originally Scranton Board of Trade), Scranton, Pennsylvania

In modified Beaux Arts style, at eight stories, the city's first "skyscraper,"

- 1897: Scranton Dry Goods (1897), originally Jonas Long's Son's later Oppenheim's, Scranton, Pennsylvania originally a dry goods store and restored as an office building;
- 1900: Lackawanna Iron & Steel Company Administration Building Buffalo, New York
- 1901: Scranton Armory (1901) Romanesque Revival, Scranton, Pennsylvania (NRHP)
- 1902-1904: Covenent (Westminster) Presbyterian Church, Scranton, Pennsylvania

contains nineteen stained glass windows, including works by Tiffany

- 1902-1903: Klots Throwing Company Mill silk mill, Cumberland (NRHP)
- 1902-1912: College of Wooster: Kauke, Scovel, and Severance Hall

Following a new campus plan after a fire in 1901, in the English Collegiate Gothic or Gothic Tudor style

- 1903: Nathan Littauer Hospital (addition), Gloversville, New York
- 1906-1908: Bank for Savings, Ossining, New York (NRHP)
- 1909: Everett N. Blanke House (1909) in Rowayton, Connecticut
- 1912: Bayonne Trust, Bayonne, New Jersey (NRHP)
- 1930: Manhattan Refrigerating Company/Gansevoort Freezing and Cold Storage Company, Meatpacking District, Manhattan, New York City

Cold storage facility: through a series of brine-filled pipes leading from these buildings, the meat wholesaling establishments of the district were able to keep meat cold. Converted to apartments named “The West Coast.” in 1984.

- 1935: United States Post Office (Westport, Connecticut) (NRHP)
- Carbondale New York Company, 173-175 Christopher Street, West Village, Manhattan, warehouse buildings
- Christ Hospital, The Heights, Jersey City, New Jersey (demolished)
- Christian Workers’ Home, Gramercy Park, Manhattan, New York City
- Apartments, NE corner of Lombard and Carlisle Streets, Philadelphia
