= National Register of Historic Places listings in Lackawanna County, Pennsylvania =

Location of Lackawanna County in Pennsylvania

This is a list of the National Register of Historic Places listings in Lackawanna County, Pennsylvania.

This is intended to be a complete list of the properties and districts on the National Register of Historic Places in Lackawanna County, Pennsylvania, United States. The locations of National Register properties and districts for which the latitude and longitude coordinates are included below, may be seen in a map.

There are 38 properties and districts listed on the National Register in the county. One site is further designated as a National Historic Landmark and another is designated as a National Historic Site.

This National Park Service list is complete through NPS recent listings posted September 11, 2026.

== Current listings ==
	Name on the Register	Image	Date listed	Location	City or town	Description
1	Ad-Lin Building	Ad-Lin Building	November 5, 1987 (#87001969)	600 Linden Street; 41°24′29″N 75°39′41″W	Scranton	
2	Albright Memorial Building	Albright Memorial Building	May 22, 1978 (#78002411)	North Washington Avenue and Vine Street; 41°24′39″N 75°39′35″W	Scranton	
3	Bethel AME Church		September 1, 2026 (#100013361)	714-716 N Washington Avenue; 41°24′51″N 75°39′24″W	Scranton	
4	Carbondale City Hall and Courthouse	Carbondale City Hall and Courthouse	January 6, 1983 (#83002248)	One North Main Street; 41°34′20″N 75°30′13″W	Carbondale	
5	Joseph Cassese House	Joseph Cassese House	October 24, 1997 (#97001258)	1000 Clay Avenue; 41°24′47″N 75°38′48″W	Scranton	
6	Central Railroad of New Jersey Freight Station	Central Railroad of New Jersey Freight Station	August 1, 1979 (#79002250)	602 West Lackawanna Avenue; 41°24′42″N 75°40′16″W	Scranton	
7	Century Club of Scranton	Century Club of Scranton	March 28, 1996 (#96000323)	612 Jefferson Avenue; 41°24′42″N 75°39′21″W	Scranton	
8	Delaware, Lackawanna and Western Railroad Station	Delaware, Lackawanna and Western Railroad Station	December 6, 1977 (#77001170)	Lackawanna and Jefferson Avenues; 41°24′19″N 75°39′43″W	Scranton	
9	Delaware, Lackawanna and Western Railroad Yard-Dickson Manufacturing Co. Site	Delaware, Lackawanna and Western Railroad Yard-Dickson Manufacturing Co. Site	November 21, 1990 (#90001739)	Roughly bounded by Cliff Street, Lackawanna Avenue, Mattes Avenue, River Street and the Lackawanna River; 41°24′23″N 75°40′09″W	Scranton	
10	Dickson Works	Dickson Works	May 14, 1979 (#79002251)	225 Vine Street; also 215 Vine Street; 41°24′49″N 75°39′45″W	Scranton	Second address represents a boundary increase approved December 12, 2024.
11	Dime Bank Building	Dime Bank Building	July 14, 1978 (#78002412)	Wyoming Avenue and Spruce Street; 41°24′30″N 75°39′56″W	Scranton	
12	Finch Building	Finch Building	June 14, 1976 (#76001644)	424 Wyoming Avenue; 41°24′42″N 75°39′43″W	Scranton	
13	First Church of Christ, Scientist	First Church of Christ, Scientist	May 9, 1988 (#88000467)	520 Vine Street; 41°24′32″N 75°39′38″W	Scranton	
14	Florence Apartments	Florence Apartments	January 5, 1984 (#84003412)	643 Adams Avenue; 41°24′46″N 75°39′24″W	Scranton	
15	Grand Army of the Republic Building	Grand Army of the Republic Building	May 17, 1984 (#84003416)	303 Linden Street; 41°24′39″N 75°39′55″W	Scranton	
16	Harrison Avenue Bridge	Harrison Avenue Bridge	June 22, 1988 (#88000767)	Legislative Route 5 over Legislative Route 35009, Par–Roaring Brook and railroad 41°24′00″N 75°39′06″W	Scranton	
17	Lackawanna Avenue Commercial Historic District	Lackawanna Avenue Commercial Historic District	November 10, 1983 (#83004215)	Roughly bounded by Adams, Franklin, Bogart Place, and Spruce Streets; 41°24′27″N 75°39′55″W	Scranton	
18	Lackawanna County Courthouse and John Mitchell Monument	Lackawanna County Courthouse and John Mitchell Monument	November 5, 1997 (#97001257)	Bounded by Washington Avenue, Linden Street, Adams Avenue, and Spruce Street; 41°24′29″N 75°39′46″W	Scranton	
19	Lackawanna Iron and Coal Company Furnace	Lackawanna Iron and Coal Company Furnace	September 6, 1991 (#91001126)	159 Cedar Avenue; 41°24′16″N 75°39′45″W	Scranton	
20	Lackawanna Mills and Scranton Button Historic District	Lackawanna Mills and Scranton Button Historic District	May 1, 2017 (#100000942)	Bounded by Cedar & Remington Aves., Cherry & Brook Sts. 41°23′41″N 75°40′30″W	Scranton	
21	James Madison School	James Madison School	June 24, 2009 (#09000463)	528 Quincy Avenue; 41°24′30″N 75°39′11″W	Scranton	Educational Resources of Pennsylvania MPS
22	Masonic Temple and Scottish Rite Cathedral	Masonic Temple and Scottish Rite Cathedral	November 7, 1997 (#97001259)	416–420 North Washington Avenue; 41°24′39″N 75°39′38″W	Scranton	
23	Municipal Building and Central Fire Station, 340	Municipal Building and Central Fire Station, 340	September 11, 1981 (#81000544)	North Washington Avenue and 518 Mulberry Street; 41°24′36″N 75°39′41″W	Scranton	
24	North Scranton Junior High School	North Scranton Junior High School	September 24, 1999 (#99001197)	1539 North Main Avenue; 41°25′42″N 75°38′51″W	Scranton	
25	Terence V. Powderly House	Terence V. Powderly House	October 15, 1966 (#66000667)	614 North Main Street; 41°25′07″N 75°40′30″W	Scranton	
26	St. Luke's Episcopal Church & Throop Memorial Parish House	St. Luke's Episcopal Church & Throop Memorial Parish House	April 10, 2025 (#100011675)	232 Wyoming Avenue; 41°24′34″N 75°39′51″W	Scranton	
27	St. Peter's Cathedral Complex	St. Peter's Cathedral Complex	July 19, 1976 (#76001645)	315 Wyoming Avenue; 41°24′38″N 75°39′50″W	Scranton	
28	Scranton Armory	Scranton Armory	December 22, 1989 (#89002081)	900 Adams Avenue; 41°24′55″N 75°39′10″W	Scranton	
29	Scranton Chamber of Commerce Building	Scranton Chamber of Commerce Building	September 8, 2011 (#11000647)	426 Mulberry Street; 41°24′38″N 75°39′42″W	Scranton	
30	Scranton Electric Building	Scranton Electric Building	April 27, 2023 (#100008866)	507 Linden St. 41°24′32″N 75°39′43″W	Scranton	
31	Scranton Lace Company	Scranton Lace Company	April 16, 2012 (#12000221)	1315 Meylert St. 41°25′36″N 75°39′34″W	Scranton	
32	Silkman House	Silkman House	December 18, 1978 (#78002413)	2006 North Main Avenue; 41°26′17″N 75°39′21″W	Scranton	
33	Steamtown National Historic Site	Steamtown National Historic Site	October 30, 1986 (#01000282)	150 South Washington Avenue; 41°24′26″N 75°40′12″W	Scranton	
34	Stoehr and Fister Building	Stoehr and Fister Building	November 25, 2019 (#100004662)	200 Adams Ave. 41°24′26″N 75°39′44″W	Scranton	
35	Tripp Family Homestead	Tripp Family Homestead	June 19, 1972 (#72001126)	1011 North Main Avenue; 41°25′36″N 75°40′12″W	Scranton	
36	U.S. Post Office and Court House	U.S. Post Office and Court House	January 4, 2018 (#100001953)	235 N Washington Ave. 41°24′31″N 75°39′47″W	Scranton	AKA the William J. Nealon Federal Building and United States Courthouse
37	Waverly Historic District	Waverly Historic District	August 20, 2004 (#04000884)	Roughly centered on Academy Street and Abington Road, including Carbondale Road and Beech, Cole, Church, and Dearborn Streets; 41°31′38″N 75°42′18″W	Waverly Township	
38	Roger Williams Public School No. 10	Roger Williams Public School No. 10	June 13, 1997 (#97000520)	901 Prospect Avenue; 41°23′43″N 75°39′58″W	Scranton	

== Former listings ==
	Name on the Register	Image	Date listed	Date removed	Location	City or town	Description
1	James L. Crawford House		February 8, 1980 (#80003505)	March 9, 1992	313 Monroe Ave.	Scranton	Demolished on November 1, 1991.
2	Dalton House		May 22, 1978 (#78002410)	November 11, 2002	East Main Street	Dalton	Demolished on July 10, 1999.
3	Delaware and Hudson Canal Gravity Railroad Shops		November 30, 1978 (#78002409)	September 15, 1987	91 North Main Street	Carbondale	Demolished in August, 1987.
4	Watkins-Maxey House		June 27, 1980 (#80003506)	June 27, 1986	520 Monroe Avenue	Scranton	

== See also ==
- List of National Historic Landmarks in Pennsylvania
- National Register of Historic Places listings in Pennsylvania
- List of Pennsylvania state historical markers in Lackawanna County
