= List of Pennsylvania state historical markers in Lackawanna County =

Location of Lackawanna County in Pennsylvania

This is a list of the Pennsylvania state historical markers in Lackawanna County.

This is intended to be a complete list of the official state historical markers placed in Lackawanna County, Pennsylvania by the Pennsylvania Historical and Museum Commission (PHMC). The locations of the historical markers, as well as the latitude and longitude coordinates as provided by the PHMC's database, are included below when available. There are 34 historical markers located in Lackawanna County.

== Historical markers ==
Marker title	Image	Date dedicated	Location	Marker type	Topics
Pioneer, The		July 15, 1948	Nay Aug Park at railroad car (on "road" across from Vine St., near Arthur Ave., behind Everhart Mus.), Scranton; 41.400777°N 75.643409°W	Roadside	Railroads, Transportation
1902 Anthracite Coal Strike		October 25, 2002	Adams Ave. side of Courthouse Square (near John Mitchell monument), Scranton; 41.408969°N 75.662412°W	Roadside	Coal, Government & Politics 20th Century, Labor
Anthracite Mine Disaster		October 23, 1994	In front of Throop Borough Bldg., Charles St. & Sanderson Ave., Throop; 41.445926°N 75.620445°W	Roadside	Business & Industry, Coal, Government & Politics 20th Century, Labor
Capoose		December 2, 1947	1030 Providence Rd., at Diamond St., West Scranton; 41.425491°N 75.666232°W	Roadside	Early Settlement, Native American
Carbondale		June 19, 1947	60 S Main St. (Bus. 6), at Housing Authority, Carbondale; 41.570056°N 75.503195°W	Roadside	Cities & Towns, Coal
Carbondale		June 19, 1947	#5 6th Ave., at City Hall (6th Ave. side), Carbondale; 41.57225°N 75.50316°W	Roadside	Cities & Towns, Coal
Carbondale		November 12, 1947	208 Fallbrook St. (PA 106), next to guard rail, N end of Carbondale; 41.58317°N 75.51279°W	Roadside	Cities & Towns, Coal
Coal Miners' and Laborers' Strike		August 3, 2008	SW corner of Lackawanna & Washington Aves., downtown Scranton; 41.406818°N 75.665257°W	City	Coal, Government & Politics 19th Century, Labor
Elder Miller		September 14, 1948	1214 N Abington Rd. (PA 407), at PA 632, Waverly; 41.527979°N 75.705086°W	Roadside	Early Settlement, Education, Religion
First Aid Pioneer		November 8, 1947	Bus. US 6 & PA 107, near bridge next to guardrail, Jermyn; 41.534073°N 75.551958°W	Roadside	Business & Industry, Coal, Medicine & Science, Professions & Vocations
First Electric Cars		September 15, 1948	235 Adams Ave. at Spruce St. (Courthouse Square), Scranton; 41.407373°N 75.662201°W	Roadside	Business & Industry, Electricity, Railroads
Gravity Railroad		January 3, 1999	97 N Main St. (Rt. 6), at entrance to Gravity Park, Carbondale; 41.575226°N 75.497754°W	Roadside	Coal, Railroads, Transportation
Hickory Grove Cemetery		May 3, 2003	273 Miller Rd., just south of Carbondale Road (Rt. 632), Waverly; 41.525372°N 75.69262°W	Roadside	African American, Underground Railroad
Jay Gould		June 19, 1947	River & Locust Ridge (Hwy. 2015) Rds., just S of Thornhurst; 41.17486°N 75.58849°W	Roadside	Business & Industry, Professions & Vocations, Railroads
Jay Gould		June 18, 1947	Bear Lake Rd. (SR 2016), just N of River Rd., Thornhurst; 41.178734°N 75.580819°W	Roadside	Business & Industry, Professions & Vocations, Railroads
Keyser Creek		September 2, 1948	331 N Main St. (SR 3013), 200 yds from Taylor Profess. Plaza, near guardrail, Taylor; 41.38769°N 75.704819°W	Roadside	Early Settlement, Government & Politics, Government & Politics 18th Century, Native American
Lackawanna County		May 25, 1982	512 Spruce St., (betw. N Washington Ave. & Dix Ct.) Courthouse Sq., Scranton; 41.40768°N 75.66341°W	City	Coal, Government & Politics, Government & Politics 19th Century, Native American
Lackawanna Iron		December 4, 1947	at Scranton Iron Furnaces, Cedar Ave. near Lackawanna Ave., (across from Gen. Dynamics) Scranton; 41.403623°N 75.66382°W	Roadside	Business & Industry, Iron, Railroads, Steel
Loretta Perfectus Walsh		November 11, 1995	108 Willow Ave. at Lackawanna Ave. (Hwy. 347), at Am. Legion Post, Olyphant; 41.469809°N 75.605035°W	City	Military, Military Post-Civil War, Women
Munsee Indian Village - PLAQUE		May 1, 1916	843 Providence Rd., on wall near stadium entrance, West Scranton; 41.419777°N 75.665469°W	Plaque	Early Settlement, Native American
Old Forge		July 24, 1947	S. Main St. (SR 3013) at Lonesome Rd., near metal bridge, Old Forge; 41.35925°N 75.74621°W	Roadside	Business & Industry, Cities & Towns
Pennsylvania Gravity		May 7, 1999	E Drinker St., near ramp for I-81, Dunmore; 41.411566°N 75.601046°W	Roadside	Railroads, Transportation
Rev. Jacob M. Koehler (1860-1932)		June 10, 1999	1800 N. Washington Ave., betw. Electric & Columbia, at Scranton State Schl. for Deaf, Scranton; 41.4299°N 75.64159°W	Roadside	Education, Government & Politics, Professions & Vocations, Religion
Rev. William Bishop		July 14, 1948	1124 Price St., at Main Ave., West Scranton; 41.413451°N 75.679227°W	Roadside	Religion
Robert Patrick Casey (1932-2000)		January 9, 2012	memorial park on Washington Ave. near Woodlawn St., Scranton; 41.43342°N 75.64014°W	Roadside	Environment, Government & Politics 20th Century, Governors
Rocky Glen Park		August 9, 2008	Rocky Glen Rd., 1/4 mile off Rt. 502, at old park entrance, Moosic; 41.353789°N 75.708367°W	Roadside	Ethnic & Immigration, Railroads
Scranton		September 7, 1948	PA 307 E of Scranton, (Missing)	Roadside	Cities & Towns, Government & Politics 19th Century, Iron, Steel
Scranton		September 7, 1948	US 6 / I-81 northbound, at mile marker 189.2, just north of exit 187, N of Scranton; 41.44084°N 75.62857°W	Roadside	Cities & Towns, Government & Politics 19th Century, Iron, Steel
Scranton		September 7, 1948	S Main St. at Rundle Ave., W Scranton (near Taylor Shopping Ctr.); 41.39657°N 75.68893°W	Roadside	Cities & Towns
Scranton		March 28, 1951	US 6 / I-81 southbound, near exit 191B, next to guardrail, NE of Scranton; 41.46125°N 75.6668°W	Roadside	Cities & Towns, Government & Politics 19th Century, Iron, Steel
Terence V. Powderly		November 18, 1947	N. Main Ave. & Mears St., West Scranton; 41.41935°N 75.67445°W	Roadside	Government & Politics, Labor
Tripp House, The	Tripp House side Scranton PA	n/a	1011 N. Main Ave. near Scranton Expy., Scranton; 41.42638°N 75.66969°W	Roadside	Government & Politics, Government & Politics 18th Century
Thomas J. Foster		October 5, 1948	Wyoming Ave. near Ash St., Scranton (Missing); 41.41853°N 75.65413°W	Roadside	Education, Government & Politics 19th Century, Labor, Professions & Vocations, Publishing
William W. Scranton (1917–2013)		November 25, 2016	232 Monroe Ave., Scranton; 41.41032°N 75.65312°W	City	Business & Industry, Education, Environment, Government & Politics 20th Century, Governors, Transportation

== See also ==
- List of Pennsylvania state historical markers
- National Register of Historic Places listings in Lackawanna County, Pennsylvania
