= Scranton Cultural Center =

- Masonic Temple and Scottish Rite Cathedral
- U.S. National Register of Historic Places
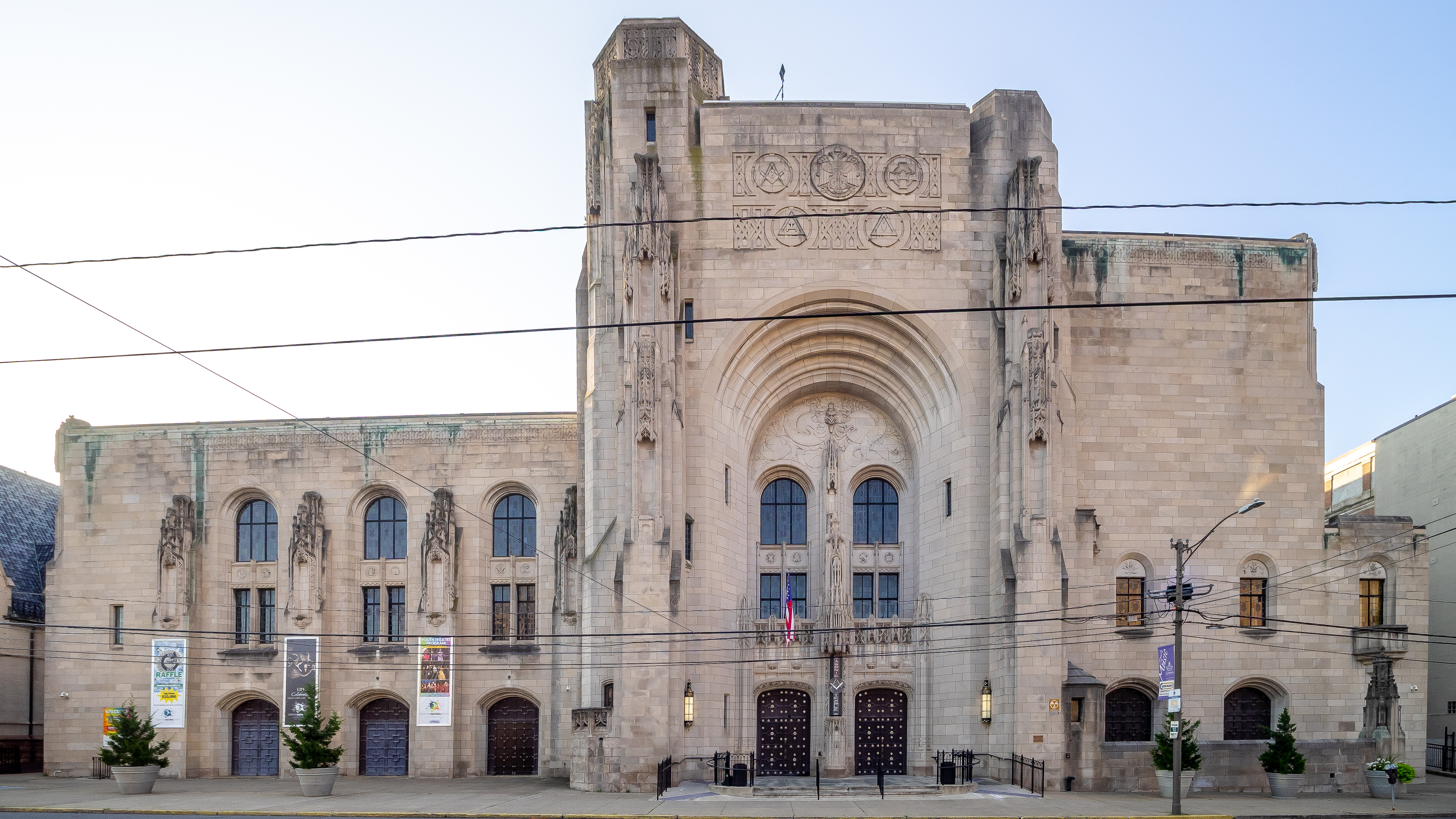
- Scranton Cultural Center at the Masonic Temple

- Location within Pennsylvania Location within the United States
- Location: 416–420 North Washington Avenue; Scranton, Pennsylvania
- Coordinates: 41°24′39″N 75°39′38″W
- Area: less than one acre
- Built: 1928
- Architect: Raymond Hood
- Architectural style: Gothic Revival, Romanesque Revival
- NRHP reference No.: 97001259
- Added to NRHP: November 7, 1997

The Scranton Cultural Center at the Masonic Temple (formerly the Masonic Temple and Scottish Rite Cathedral) is a theatre and cultural center in Scranton, Pennsylvania. The Cultural Center's mission statement is "to rejuvenate a national architectural structure as a regional center for arts, education and community activities appealing to all ages." The Cultural Center hosts national Broadway tours; professional and local musical and dramatic theatre offerings; local, regional and national orchestral and popular music, dance and opera; comedians, lecturers, art exhibits, a children's and performing arts academy and various classes as well as fundraiser galas and special events including proms, luncheons, private parties and is a popular wedding ceremony and reception venue. It is listed on the National Register of Historic Places.

== History ==
Architect Raymond Hood, with Godley & Fouilhoux and Harry V. K. Henderson, designed the Masonic Temple and Scottish Rite Cathedral, which houses the Scranton Cultural Center, the current operating organization for the building. The Masonic Temple is designed in a combination of Gothic Revival architecture and Romanesque Revival—Richardsonian Romanesque with contemporary Art Deco influences. The building was completed in 1930. The temple was designed with a dual nature; it was built to house the Scottish Rite Cathedral and a Masonic lodge while housing spaces (primarily the theater and ballroom) that were intended for public use. The design of the building is a tribute to Freemasonry.

The Masonic Temple houses: The Harry and Jeannette Weinberg Theatre which seats 1,866 for concerts, lectures, national Broadway tours, dance and other entertainment; the Governor Robert P. Casey Library; the Raymond Hood Room (renovated from the original bowling alley); a Junior Ballroom, utilized both as event space and for the Children's and Performing Arts Academy summer and after school programs; a Grand Ballroom which can hold 2,400 for standing room performances and is host to elegant weddings, community fundraisers and galas -it was designed to seat 1,000 for dinner and was the largest ballroom in the region at the time; a "Ladies Parlor" overlooking the Grand Ballroom; Shopland Hall (originally Norman Hall), a 500-seat theatre and lodge hall located on the 4th floor, Craftsmen Hall (originally the gaming and billiard room) on the 3rd Floor as well as Snyder and Gazda Hall (originally Tuscan and Flemish Halls - named for their decor) which serve as the primary Lodge rooms for the Masonic Fraternity. Both the Weinberg Theatre and Shopland Hall are equipped with Austin Organs (numbers 1713 and 1712 respectively). Most of the facility is open for public usage and rental through the year. Visitors to Scranton can visit the Temple and take a tour that highlights the architecture of the building as well as its present-day uses.

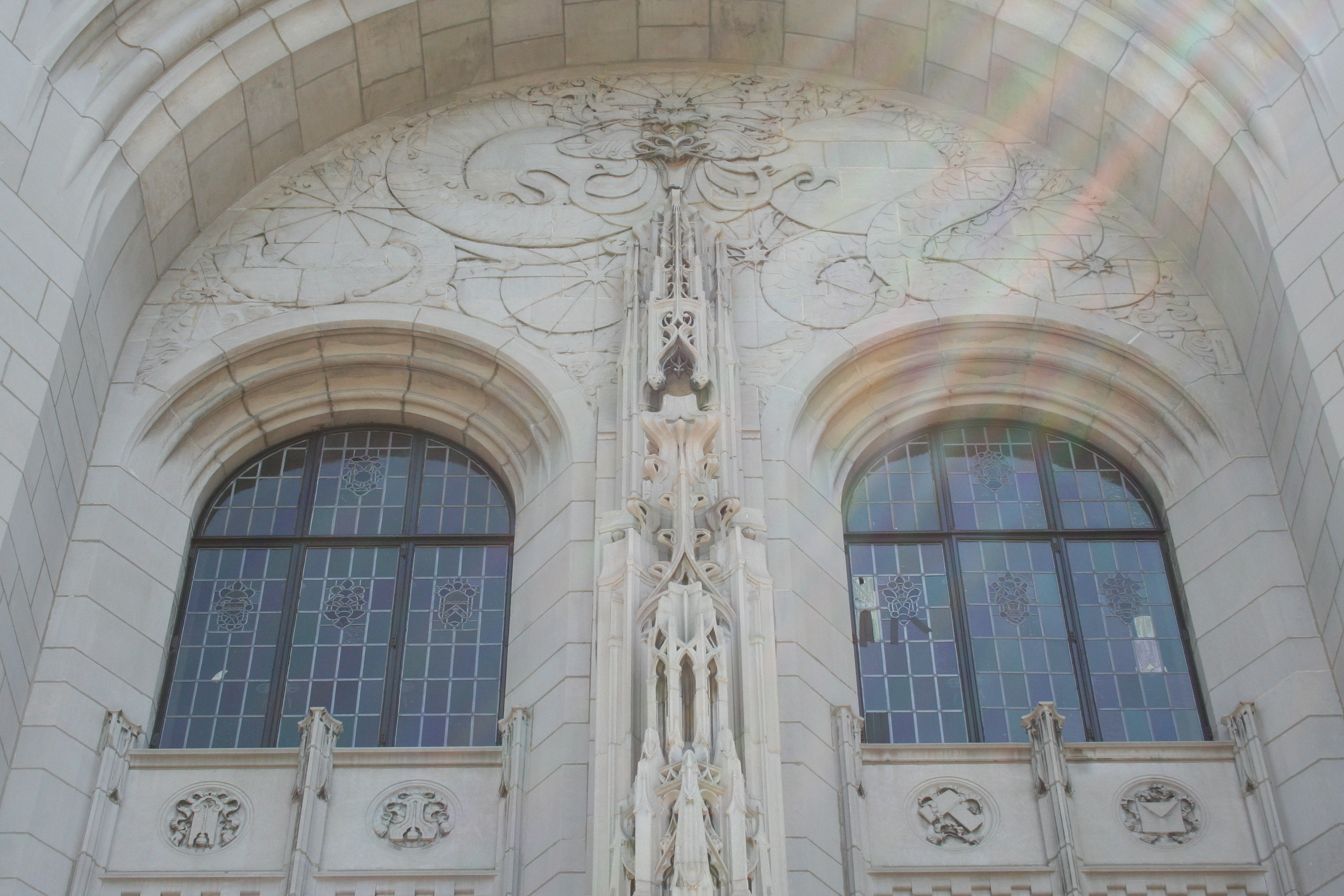
A relief of a dragon above the entrance to the Scranton Cultural Center.

== Performances ==
The Cultural Center features a wide variety of entertainments and programs. It has hosted performances by contemporary musical artists, including Alice Cooper, Jason Mraz, Dave Matthews, N Sync, Breaking Benjamin, Backstreet Boys, and Maroon 5. Performances from Jackson Browne, Lewis Black, Jeff Dunham, Shinedown, George Carlin, and The Amazing Kreskin have entertained in recent years, the venue has played host to the regional Northeastern Pennsylvania Philharmonic Orchestra and many others. The Broadway Theatre League of Northeastern Pennsylvania has produced an annual season of national Broadway tours for over 50 years at the venue, including "Rent," "Cats," "Mamma Mia!," "Les Miserables," "Jersey Boys," and "The Book of Mormon." In December 2014, the Scranton Cultural Center premiered the fully realized stage version of the musical comedy, Harry Connick Jr.'s "The Happy Elf."

== Description ==
Construction of the Masonic Temple and Scottish Rite Cathedral was begun in 1927 on the site of two former mansions. Construction of the building took three years with the Temple inauguration taking place on January 2, 1930 when the first meeting was held in the building; it was formally dedicated in May 1930. The rectangular plan building is clad in coursed ashlars of Indiana limestone supported by the structural steel framework. At approximately 188,000 square feet (17,500 m^{2}), the building houses two theaters, public and masonic meeting rooms and event spaces, a grand ballroom, as well as numerous other offices, rooms and areas. There are ten levels of the building, five of which can be accessed by elevator. The remaining five levels include a storage and dressing room floor, penthouse for elevator equipment and storage, a small light room in the northwest corner of the main core, and a two-level sub-basement sixty feet below the basement floor.

== Masonic symbols ==
Symbols of Masonry can be found throughout the Masonic Temple and Scottish Rite Cathedral, although it may not be apparent to those unfamiliar with the Craft. Shopland Hall, the small theater on the fourth floor, contains many Masonic symbols. An image of the Crusade is depicted above the stage, as well as shield motifs. These are important symbols to the Masonic Fraternity. Two-headed eagles are depicted on the ceiling of the theater. Frederick of Prussia introduced the symbol of the two headed eagle when the Scottish Rite was in its formative stages. The two-headed eagle, along with other symbols of various branches as well as the four cardinal virtues are engraved on the exterior of the building. The Robert P. Casey Library features a quintessential symbol of the Freemasons, a shovel, a pick, and a crowbar, in a glass case. Not only are these three items symbols of Masonry, but they were also used in the ceremonial groundbreaking and the accompanying ceremonial trowel was used in the laying of the cornerstone during the construction of the Masonic Temple. Also in the Casey Library is a grandfather clock that features many Masonic Symbols carved into the wood, including the shovel, pick, and crowbar motif, as well as the symbol of the square and the compass with letter “G” in the center.

== Future ==
The Scranton Cultural Center began a multimillion-dollar restoration project in the mid-1990s. Electrical services were updated and air conditioning was installed for the theatre, grand ballroom, main lobby and lower level. Expanded and ADA compliant restrooms were added and the new Raymond Hood Room were installed in the former bowling lanes space. The ballroom's ornate walls and ceilings were also restored. In 2014, the Junior Ballroom was updated to provide space for the newly begun children and youth theatre program classes and summer camp sessions, including improvements for mobility access. In the spring of 2015, air conditioning was added to Shopland Hall and the third floor lodge rooms. In 2025 LED stage lighting and a new array sound system were installed in the main theatre. Beginning in the spring of 2025 a project to replace roof, gutter, and repair exterior masonry began; the project will also include exterior door and window restorations as well as interior finish repairs to many ornate walls as well as the ceiling and proscenium in the main theatre. Further HVAC upgrades and expansion, plumbing upgrades, as well as updates and continued restoration to the Harry and Jeanette Weinberg Theatre, main organ, and stage house and mechanics are slated for the coming years.

== See also ==
- National Register of Historic Places listings in Lackawanna County, Pennsylvania
