= Terence V. Powderly House =

Historic house in Pennsylvania, United States

- U.S. National Register of Historic Places
- U.S. National Historic Landmark
- Pennsylvania state historical marker
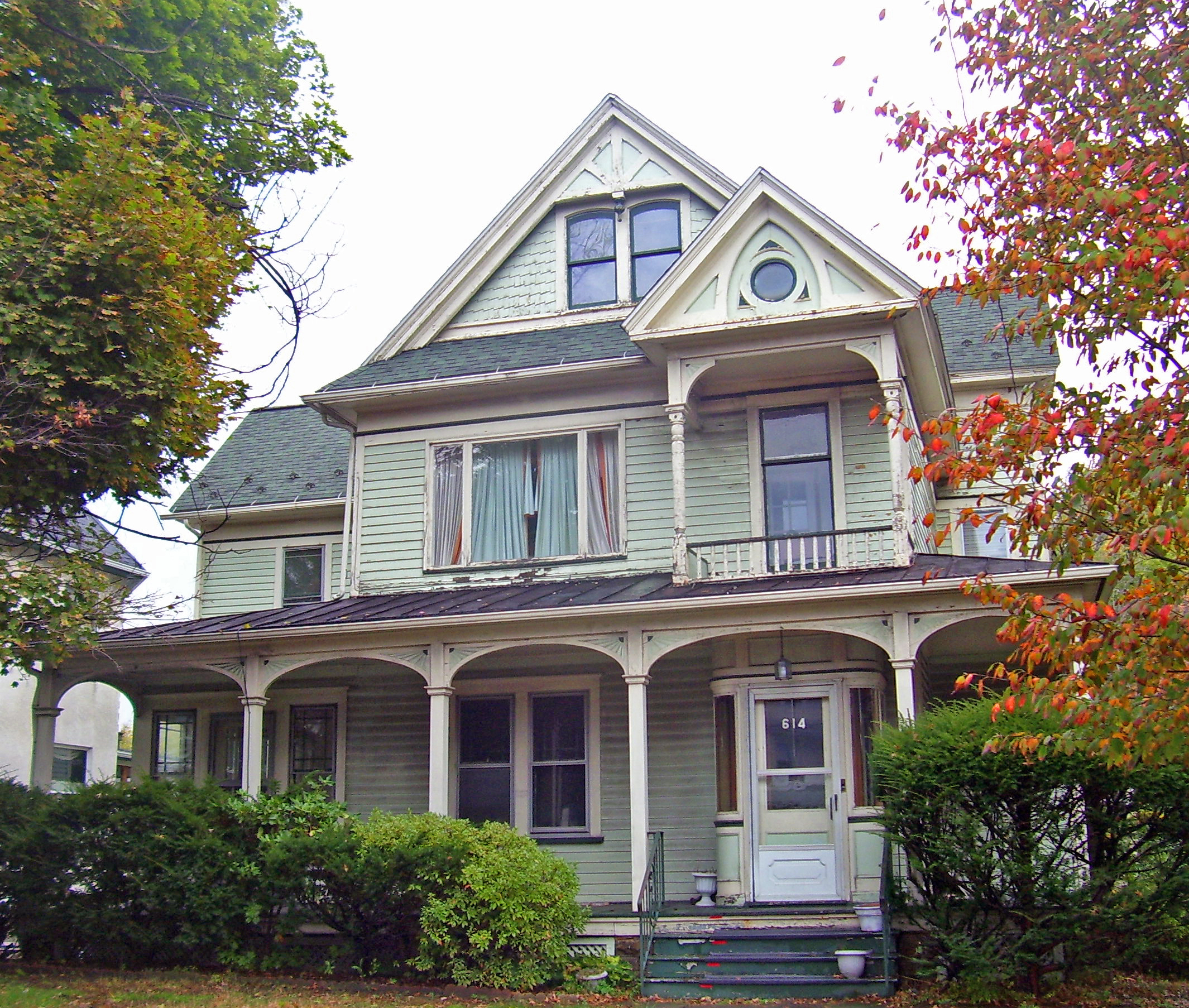
- House in 2007
- Location: 614 N. Main St., Scranton, PA
- Coordinates: 41°25′6″N 75°40′29″W
- Area: less than one acre
- Built: mid 19th century
- Architectural style: Victorian
- NRHP reference No.: 66000667

Significant dates
- Added to NRHP: October 15, 1966
- Designated NHL: May 23, 1966
- Designated PHMC: November 18, 1947

The Terence V. Powderly House is a historic house at 614 North Main Avenue in Scranton, Pennsylvania, United States. It was the home of Terence V. Powderly (1849-1924) from his early life until 1921. During this time he led the Knights of Labor, an early but unsuccessful attempt to establish a broad-based labor union. He also served as mayor of Scranton for several terms. It was designated a National Historic Landmark in 1966. It has remained a private residence and is not open to the public.

== Description and history ==
The Terence V. Powderly House stands on the east side of North Main Avenue. It is a two-story wood-frame structure, built as a single-family residence in a vernacular Victorian style, with a cross-gabled roof on a busy street in a residential neighborhood in an area slightly west of downtown Scranton, looking towards it over the Lackawanna River. The house has one architecturally noteworthy feature, a glass anteentrance to keep out cold weather, not common at that time. Since Powderly's death the house has gone through other owners but has not been substantially altered, other than the conversion of the second floor to an apartment and the addition of a picture window to that unit.

Terence Powderly was a union man from a young age, apprenticing as a machinist. He joined the Machinist and Blacksmiths Union in 1871, and rapidly rose to become its president. As such, he was among the first to lose is job during the economic downturn of the Panic of 1873. Powderly broadened his organizing base, and became a leading figure in the secretive Knights of Labor, which arose in the early 1880s to become one of the largest labor unions of the period. Powderly emphasized non-violent means to gain improvements in working conditions and pay, and the union was also socially progressive for the period, admitting both women and African Americans. In 1886 it effectively collapsed after Powderly refused to support an eight-hour workday, and opposed the more confrontational tactics of one of his ultimately more successful rivals, Samuel Gompers.

== See also ==
- List of National Historic Landmarks in Pennsylvania
- National Register of Historic Places listings in Lackawanna County, Pennsylvania
