= Pennsylvania Paper and Supply Company =

American wholesale supplies company

Pennsylvania Paper and Supply Co.
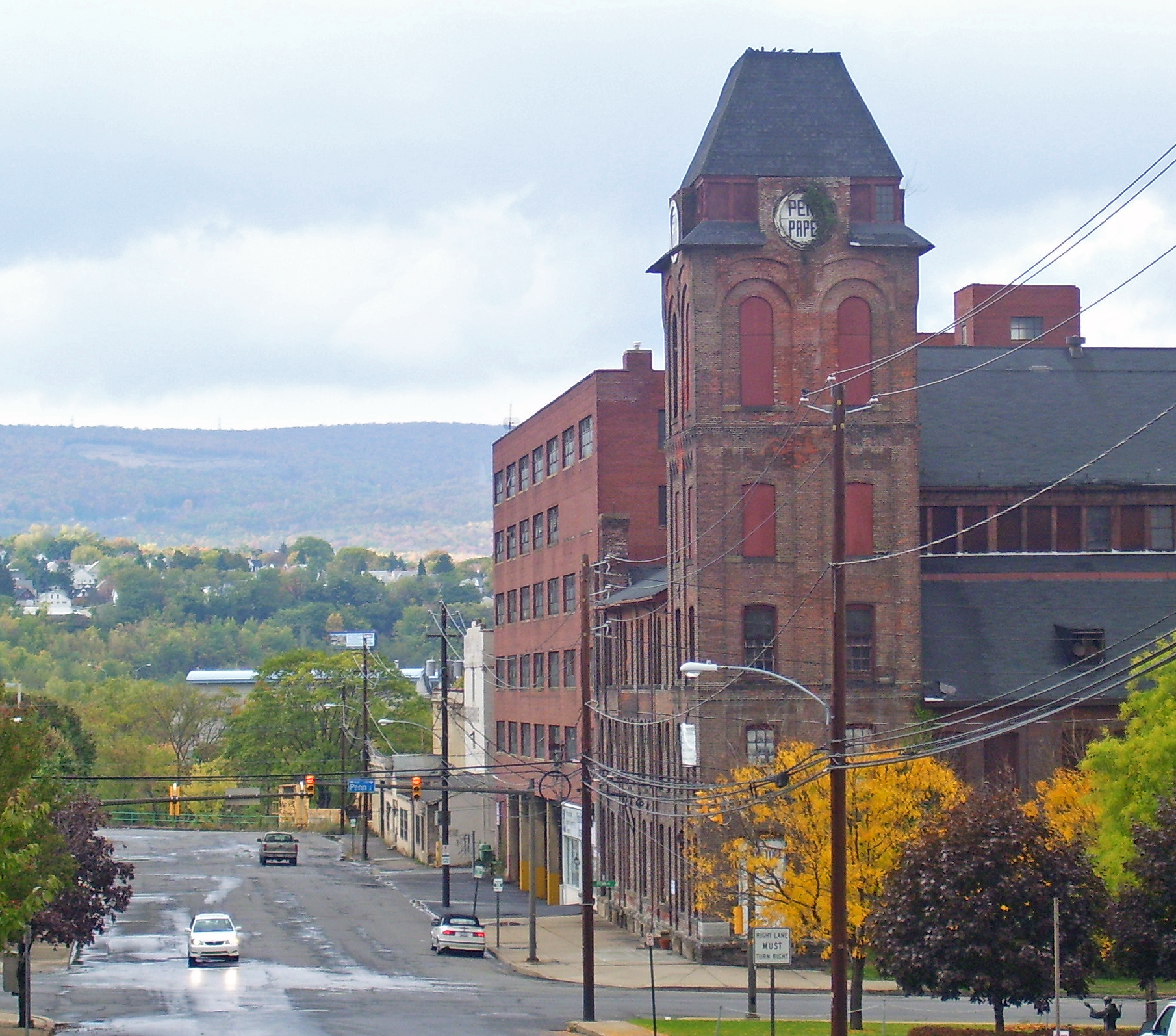
- Pennsylvania Paper and Supply Company tower
- Type: Wholesaling
- Industry: Home & office products
- Founded: 1922
- Founder: Jacob Fink
- Headquarters: Scranton, Pennsylvania
- Key people: Douglas Fink, President & CEO
- Number of employees: 230
- Footnotes; Coordinates 41°24'46"N 75°39'43"W

Pennsylvania Paper and Supply Company, situated in Scranton, Pennsylvania, is a privately owned wholesaler specializing in facilities management, industrial packaging, equipment, and supplies. Established in 1922, it holds the distinction of being one of the oldest businesses in the state still managed by a direct descendant of its founders.

Notably, the company was featured in the American television series, The Office. The iconic exterior shot of its headquarters featured in the show's opening title sequence is widely regarded as one of the most recognizable building images in television history.

== History ==
Jacob Fink started the company in 1922 to supply small grocery stores with paper bags. The business later diversified and added products and services throughout the Great Depression and World War II. The company was formally incorporated in 1951.

Initial ownership of the company was divided into 150 shares of which 44 were owned by Jacob Fink, 51 by his brother Samuel Fink, and 55 by Sam's sister, Pearl Fink. Pearl was listed as the secretary and all three constituted the board of directors. Fink also founded the Scranton Hebrew Day School.

In March 1930, Jacob Fink was seriously injured in an elevator accident at the company's plant while checking stock. Fink filed for worker's compensation as an employee of the company. The insurance company, Hudson Casualty, challenged the claim arguing that Fink, as an officer of the company, was not an eligible employee. A court ruling in 1932 ruled on behalf of the insurance company and Fink was denied the wages.

Jerome Fink, the son of the founder Jacob Fink, took over the business after returning from the Army in 1946. Fink Graduated from Scranton Central High School and attended the University of Scranton. He married his wife, Barbara, in 1958 and the couple had three children: Douglas, Lisa and Stacey. Fink served as president of Congregation Ohev Zedek in Scranton for 35 years and made philanthropic donations to area charities including Jewish Community Center of Scranton, the Jewish Home of Scranton, The Jewish Federation of Northeastern Pennsylvania, St. Francis of Assis Kitchen, and the Scranton Hebrew Day School. Fink died in 2011 at age 84. During his years leading the company, Fink oversaw a merger, an acquisition and a move to the company's present location 215 Vine Street. The larger space allowed for diversification into warehousing and storage.

Douglas Fink, Jerome Fink's son and Jacob's grandson, was named president and CEO in 1993.

In the early 1990s, two longtime competitors were acquired, nearly doubling the company's sales volume.

Although the company sells paper products such as office paper, paper packaging, toilet tissue and paper towels, the majority of its products today are janitorial supplies.

As of 2017 the core paper company employed 50 people with 230 employees in affiliated businesses.

In January 2021, the company purchased American Janitor and Paper Supply Company located on Sanderson Avenue in Scranton. The company celebrated 100 years in business in May 2022 with a ribbon cutting ceremony in front of the Scranton headquarters.

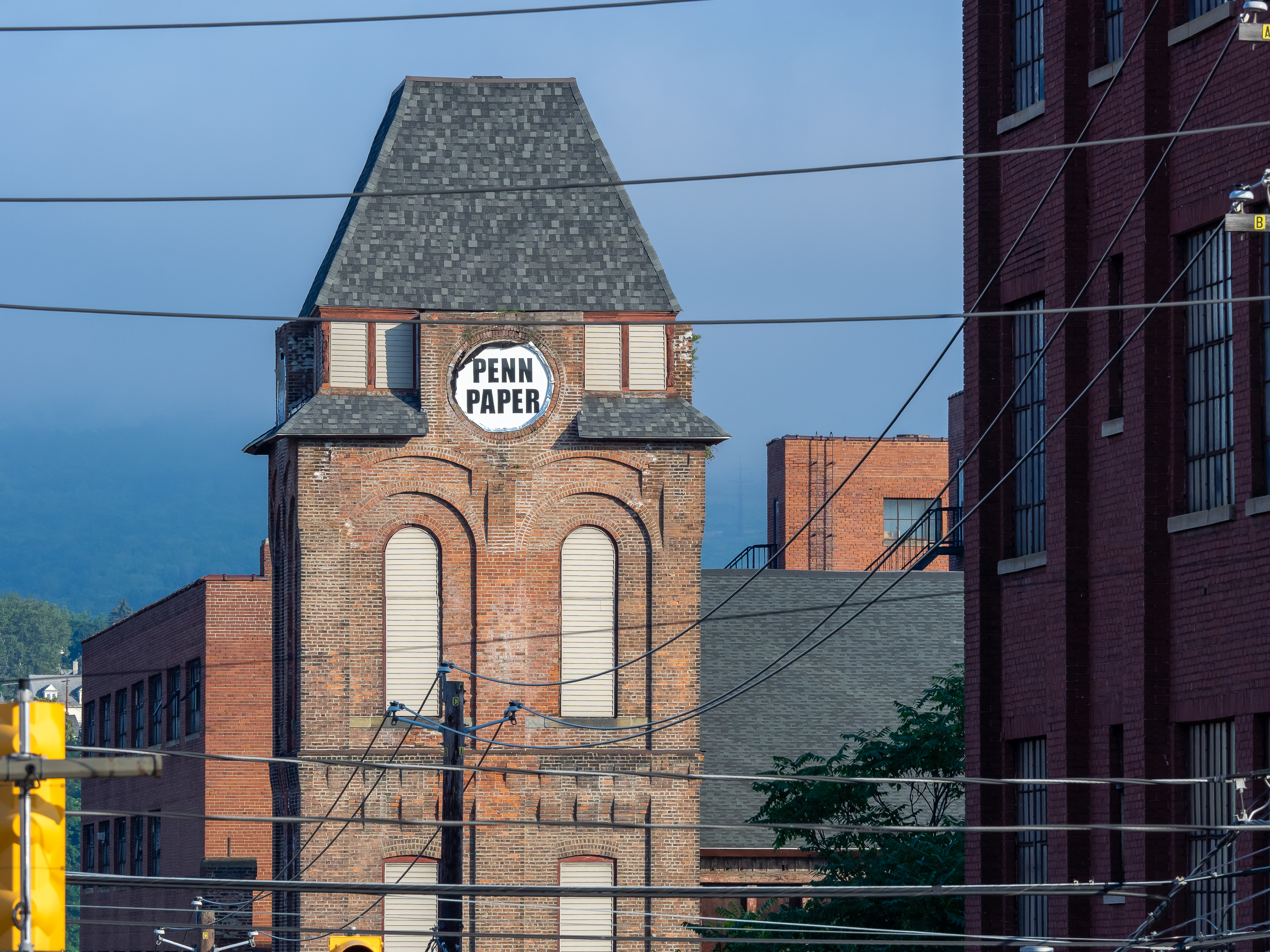
Dickson Warehouse Tower in downtown Scranton, PA

== Buildings and headquarters ==
From 1924 through 1938 Pennsylvania Paper and Supply moved headquarters multiple times from 7th Avenue to Mulberry Street and then 6th Avenue. In 1929 the company moved to a larger warehouse at 440-2-4 North Sixth Ave. in a building that had been previously occupied by Harry Solomon & Company.

The company then moved to the entire block at 12 Lackawanna Avenue from 1938 to 1944. From 1944 to 1970, the company operated from 25 Lackawanna Ave. The roof of the company's original warehouse at 25 Lackawanna Ave. was severely damaged in a wind storm on December 30, 1964.

In 1970 the company moved to its present location at 215 Vine Street, a former A&P bakery known as the Quackenbush Warehouse. In December of 1977, Jerome Fink purchased a series of parcels and buildings adjacent to 215 Vine in downtown Scranton. These included 225 Vine, the Dickson Works building on the corner of Penn Ave. and Vine St. In 1979, the property was entered into the National Register of Historic Places.

The company has been in the same 255,000 square foot building on Vine Street since the 1970s. The outside of the building contains a painted sign on a window welcoming tourists. The main office has a sample table with new products.

== Inspiration for The Office ==
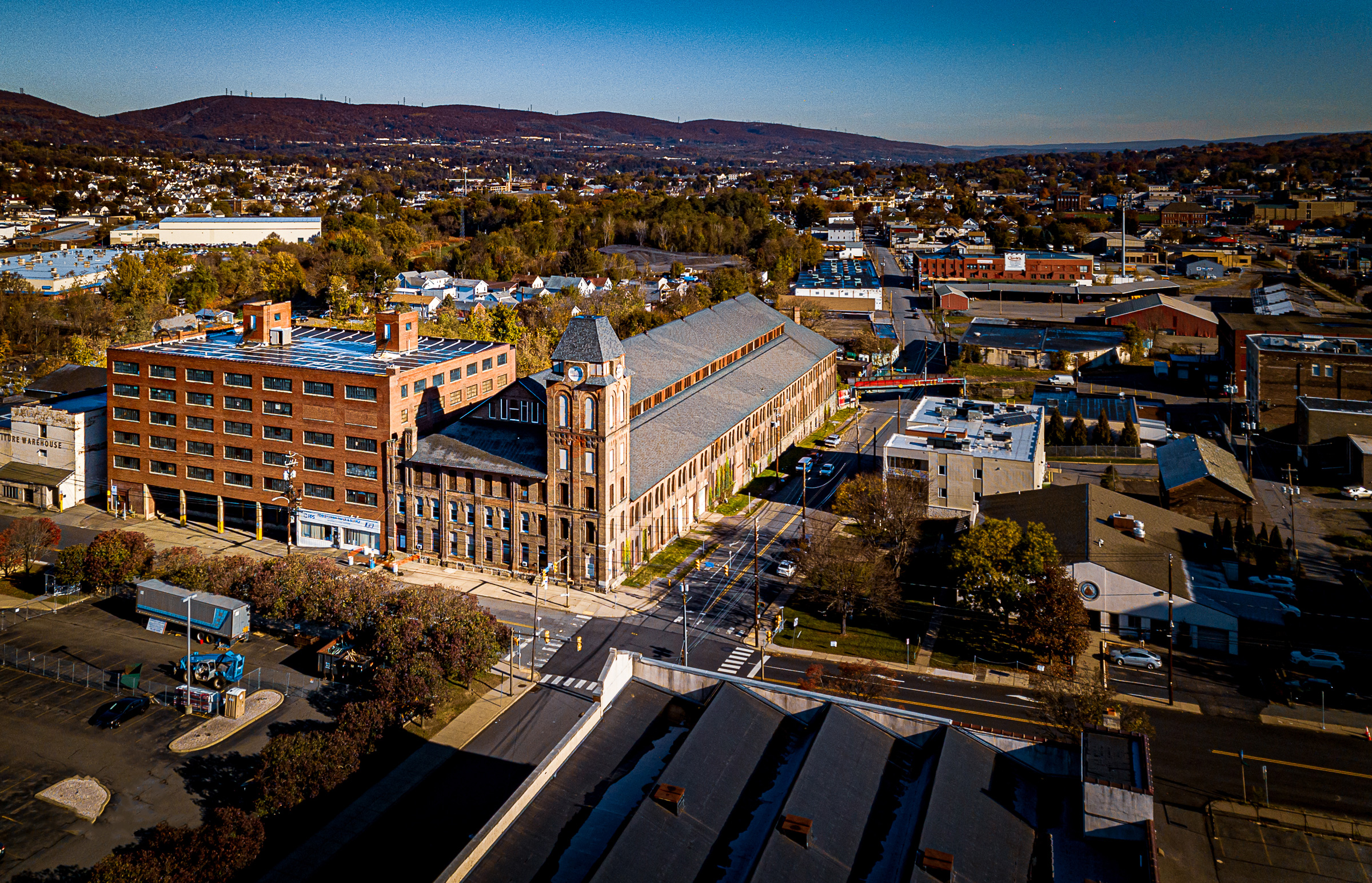
Pennsylvania Paper and Supply Company in Scranton, PA

In 2004 CEO Douglas Fink was contacted by Reveille Productions who were conducting research on paper companies in order to create an American version of a hit British television show. The producers visited Pennsylvania Paper and Supply Company and interviewed members of the company as part of their research.

The opening credits footage was shot in 2004 by actor John Krasinski while researching his role as Jim Halpert. Scranton was chosen as the setting of the show partially because of its believable distance as a regional office of a New York City-based business. The exterior image of the company's tower is considered by videoblocks.com as among the most recognized pieces of stock footage in television history alongside the Brady Bunch house and the restaurant from Seinfeld. The building is annually among the top 10 places to visit for fans of The Office.
