= Scranton Chamber of Commerce Building =

- U.S. National Register of Historic Places
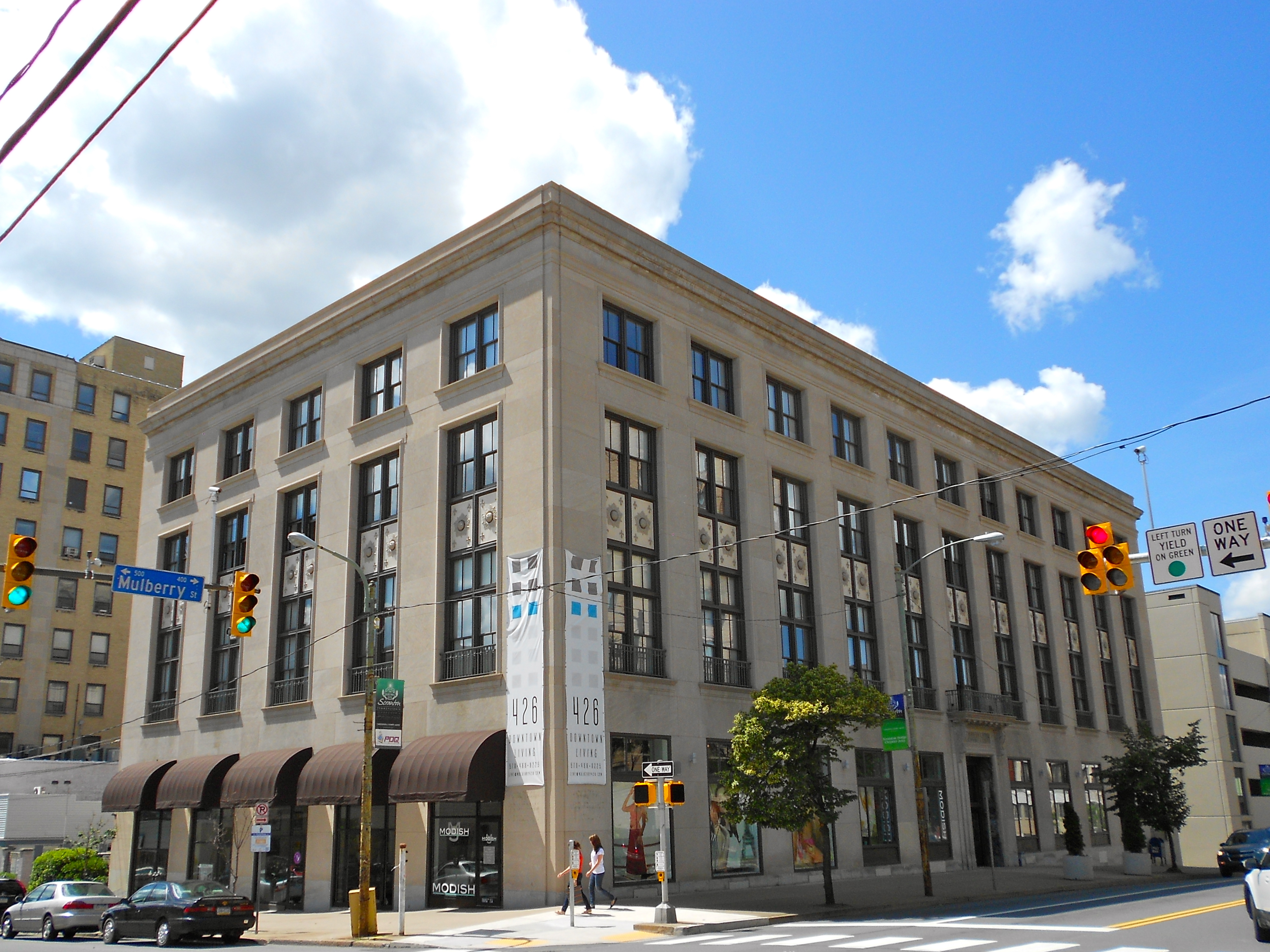

- Location within Pennsylvania Location within the United States
- Location: 426 Mulberry Street, Scranton, Pennsylvania
- Coordinates: 41°24′38″N 75°39′42″W
- Built: 1926, c. 1991
- NRHP reference No.: 11000647
- Added to NRHP: September 8, 2011

Scranton Chamber of Commerce Building is a historic commercial building located at Scranton, Lackawanna County, Pennsylvania. It was built in 1926, and alterations were made around 1991.

It was added to the National Register of Historic Places in 2011.
