= Dickson Works =

- U.S. National Register of Historic Places
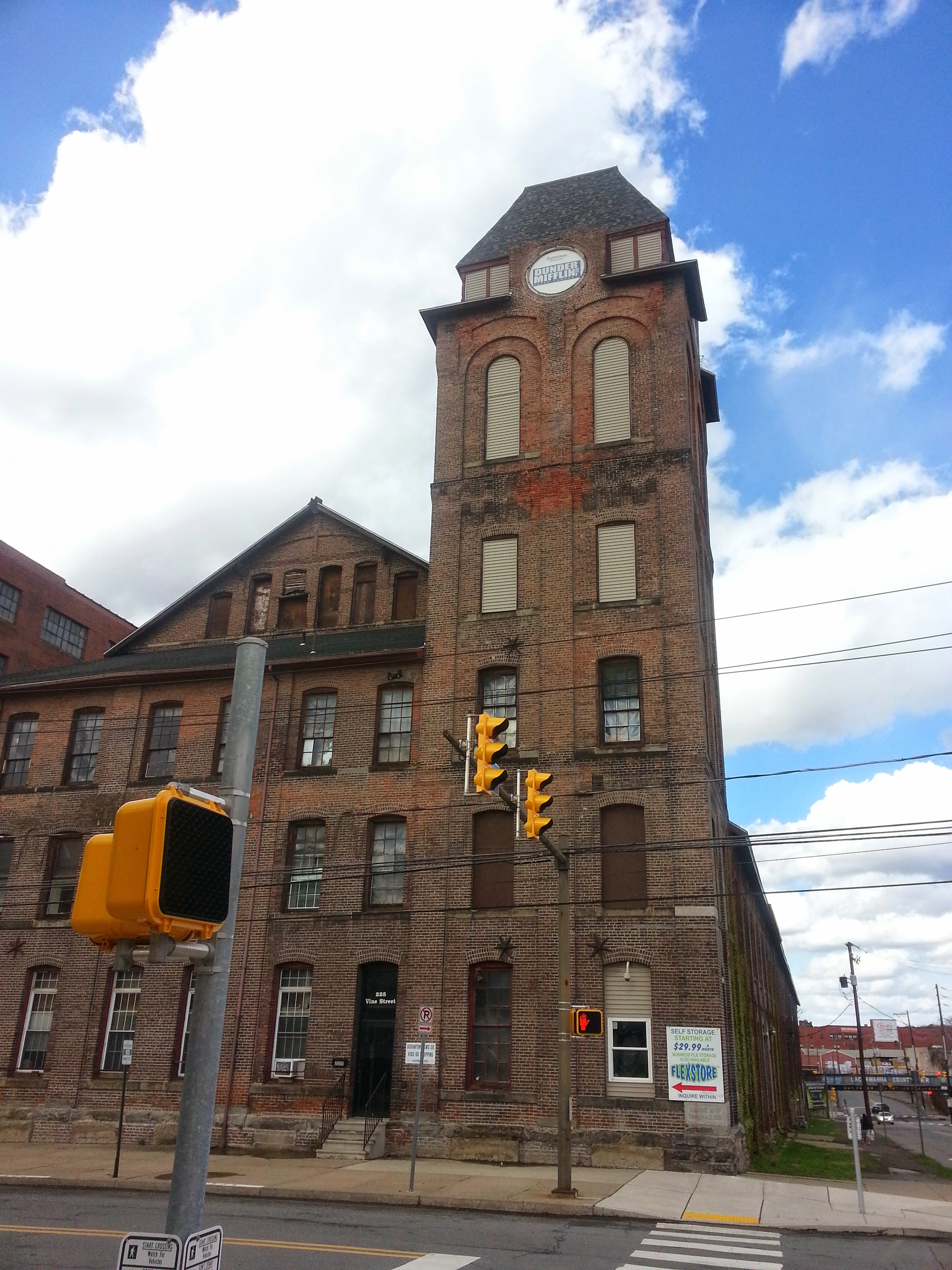
- Dickson Works, May 2014

- Location within Pennsylvania Location within the United States
- Location: 215 & 225 Vine St., Scranton, Pennsylvania
- Coordinates: 41°24′49″N 75°39′45″W
- Area: 1 acre (0.40 ha)
- Built: c. 1856
- NRHP reference No.: 79002251 (original); 100011135 (increase)

Significant dates
- Added to NRHP: May 14, 1979
- Boundary increase: December 12, 2024

Dickson Works, also known as the Stacor Building, is an historic factory building located at 225 Vine Street in Scranton, Pennsylvania, a town in Lackawanna County. It was built about 1856, and is a long three-story, brick industrial building measuring 100 feet by 300 feet. It features a tower measuring 100 feet tall, a double pitched roof with clerestory windows, and shallow segmental arched windows. It once housed the Dickson Works, a shop to repair and manufacture mine machinery and boilers. The Stacor Equipment Company occupied the building in 1963, and manufactured library tables and furniture. The building was listed on the National Register of Historic Places in 1979. The listing was expanded in 2024 to include the adjacent building at 215 Vine Street.

In December 1977, Jerome Fink, then CEO of Pennsylvania Paper & Supply Co., purchased the Dickson works building at 225 Vine Street. It was submitted by Fink to the National Register of Historic Places in March of 1979 and entered into the register in May of the same year.

The Dickson Manufacturing company built locomotives, stationary engines, and boilers. The company also provided materials to railways including gas pipes and fittings, steam and water fittings and engine furnishings.

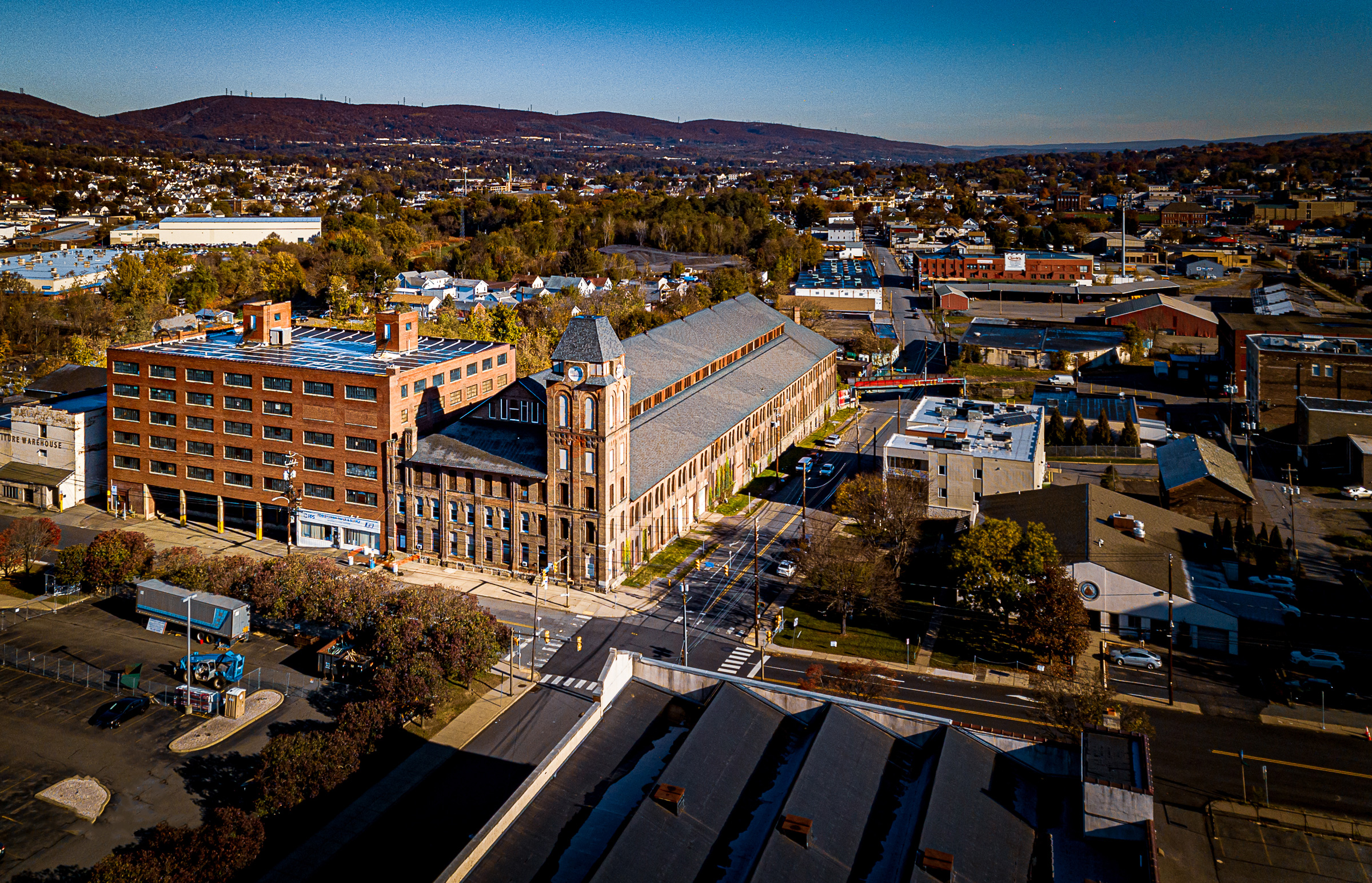
Aerial view of Dickson Works building in downtown Scranton, Pennsylvania.
