= Ad-Lin Building =

- U.S. National Register of Historic Places
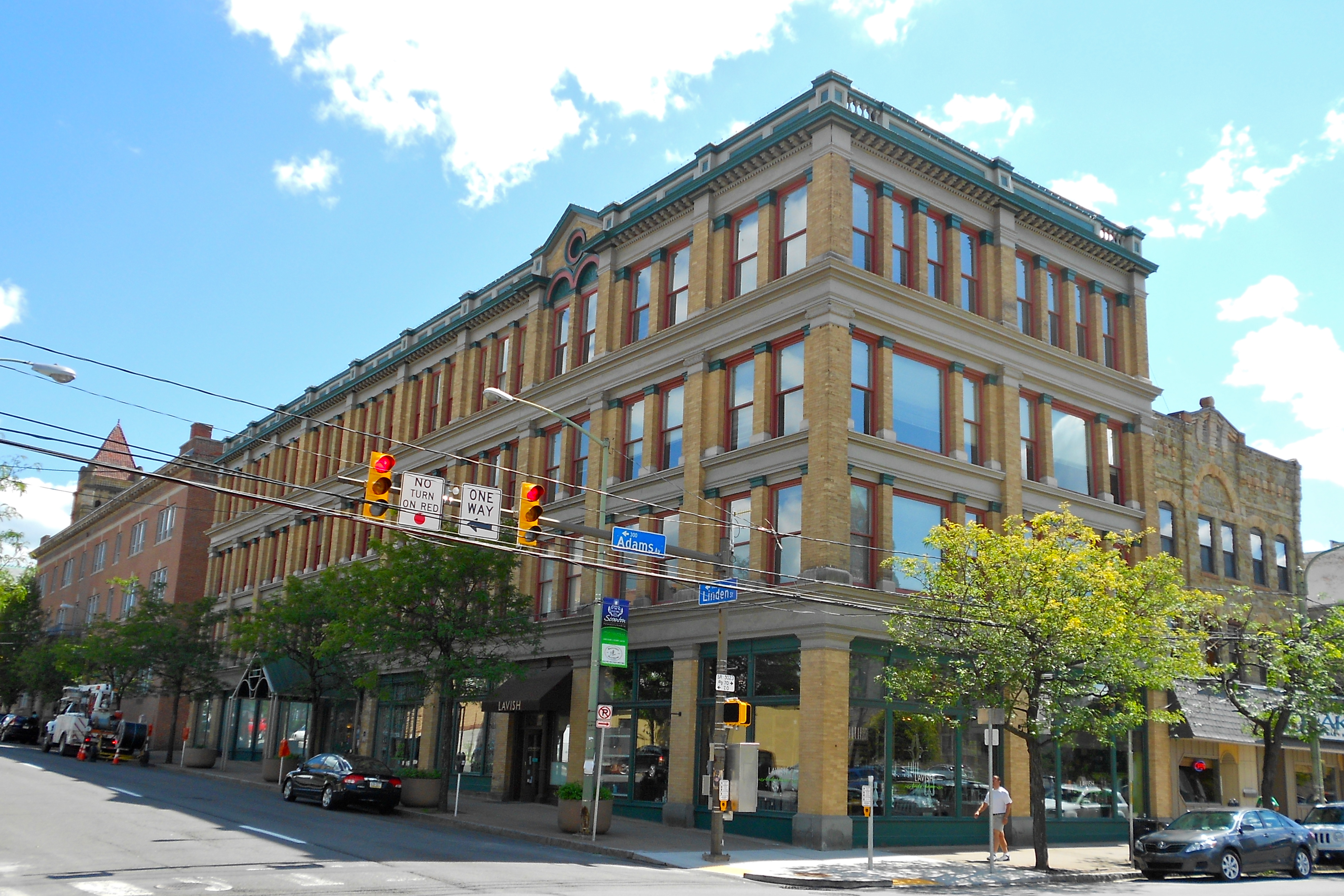
- in 2013

- Location within Pennsylvania Location within the United States
- Location: 600 Linden St., Scranton, Pennsylvania
- Coordinates: 41°24′29″N 75°39′41″W
- Area: 0.2 acres (0.081 ha)
- Built: 1896-1897
- Architectural style: Classical Revival, Other, Commercial Style
- NRHP reference No.: 87001969
- Added to NRHP: November 5, 1987

The Ad-Lin Building, also known as Linden Plaza, is an historic commercial building that is located in Scranton, Lackawanna County, Pennsylvania, United States.

It was added to the National Register of Historic Places in 1984.

== History and architectural features ==
Built in 1896, this historic structure is a four-story, rectangular, brick building with Classical Revival-style design elements. It measures 45 feet by 150 feet and 2 bays by 10 bays. It features large expanses of glass and a projecting metal cornice. The building was rehabilitated in 1985.
