= North Scranton Junior High School =

- U.S. National Register of Historic Places
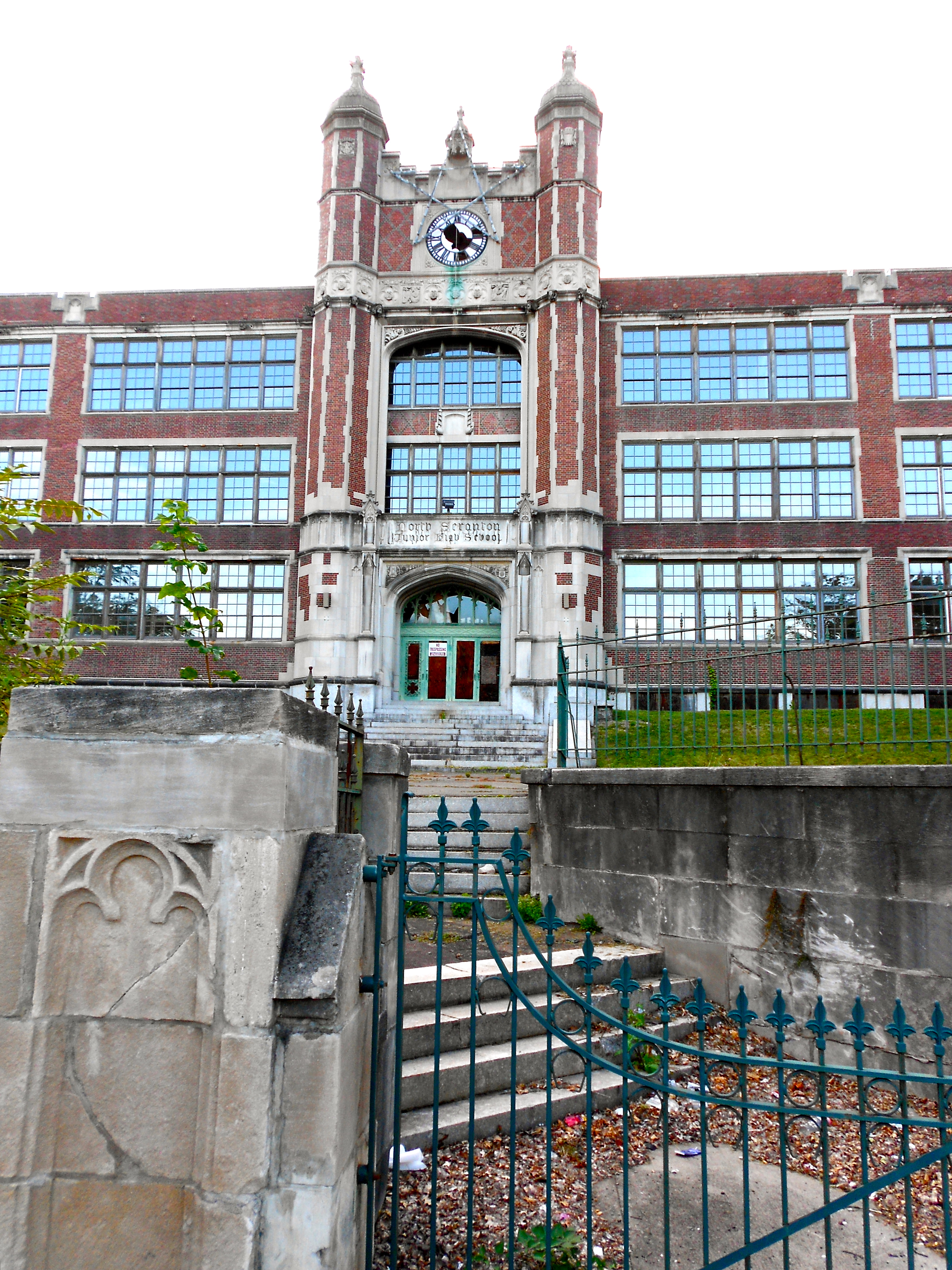
- Main gate in 2013

- Location within Pennsylvania Location within the United States
- Location: 1539 N. Main Ave., Scranton, Pennsylvania
- Coordinates: 41°26′03″N 75°39′44″W
- Area: 4.4 acres (1.8 ha)
- Built: 1922-1924
- Architect: Edson Gilbert; Sinclair & Grigg
- Architectural style: Late Gothic Revival
- NRHP reference No.: 99001197
- Added to NRHP: September 24, 1999

The North Scranton Junior High School is a historic American junior high school building located at Scranton, Lackawanna County, Pennsylvania.

It was listed on the National Register of Historic Places in 1999.

== History and architectural features ==
Built between 1922 and 1924, this historic structure is a three-story, brick and stone building that was designed in the Late Gothic Revival style. It features a four-story clock tower and a tall Gothic arch surrounding the main entrance. The school was abandoned in 1987. In 2015, it re-opened as an apartment building for senior citizens.
