= James L. Crawford House =

Historic house in Pennsylvania, United States

- Formerly listed on the U.S. National Register of Historic Places
- Location within Pennsylvania Location within the United States
- Location: 313 Monroe Ave., Scranton, Pennsylvania
- Area: 0.5 acres (0.20 ha)
- Built: 1898
- Architectural style: Tudor Revival, Modified English Tudor
- NRHP reference No.: 80003505

Significant dates
- Added to NRHP: 1980
- Removed from NRHP: March 9, 1992

James L. Crawford House, also known as Lackawanna County House of Detention, was a historic home located at Scranton, Lackawanna County, Pennsylvania. It was built in 1898, and was a Tudor Revival style dwelling.

It was added to the National Register of Historic Places in 1980. It was delisted in 1992, after being demolished in 1991.
