= Dime Bank Building =

- U.S. National Register of Historic Places
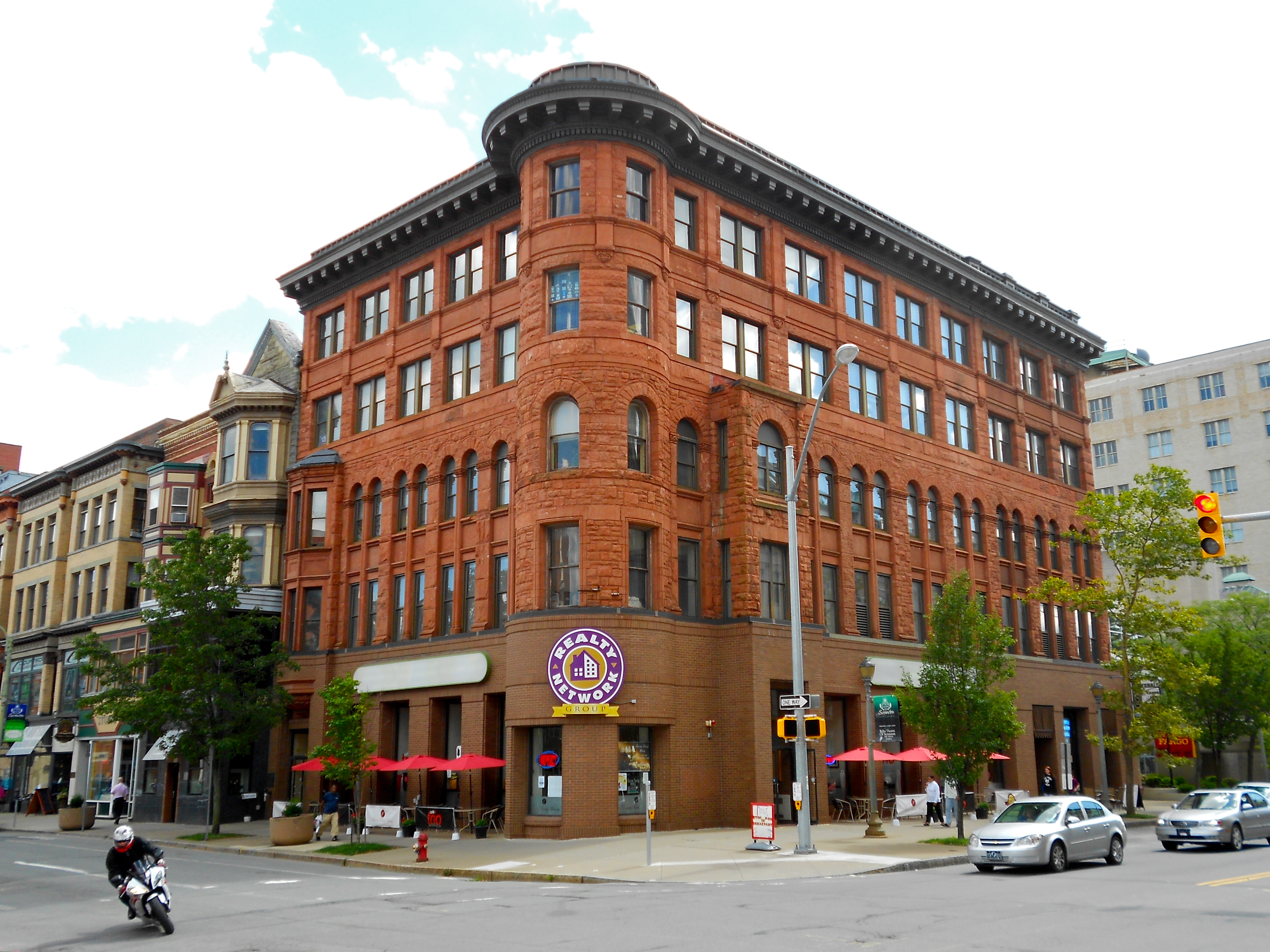
- The Dime Bank building in 2013

- Location within Pennsylvania Location within the United States
- Location: Wyoming Ave. and Biden St., Scranton, Pennsylvania
- Coordinates: 41°24′32″N 75°39′53″W
- Area: 0.8 acres (0.32 ha)
- Built: 1890–1891; 135 years ago, 1908; 118 years ago
- Architectural style: Romanesque, Richardsonian Romanesque
- NRHP reference No.: 78002412
- Added to NRHP: July 14, 1978

Dime Bank Building, also known as the Dime Bank & Trust Company Building, is a historic commercial building located at Scranton, Lackawanna County, Pennsylvania. It is a five-story brick building in the Richardsonian Romanesque style. The original three-story building was built in 1890-1891, and measured 70 by 70 feet (21 by 21 m). Soon after, an additional two-stories were added, as well as a wing measuring 30 by 175 feet (9.1 by 53.3 m). In 1908, the building was again expanded with a concrete and slab fireproof wing. The facade features a delicately ornamented bay window, five-story turret, and three-story rectangular projection terminated at the third floor by a large arched masonry opening.

It was added to the National Register of Historic Places in 1978. It is located in the Lackawanna Avenue Commercial Historic District.

== Gallery ==
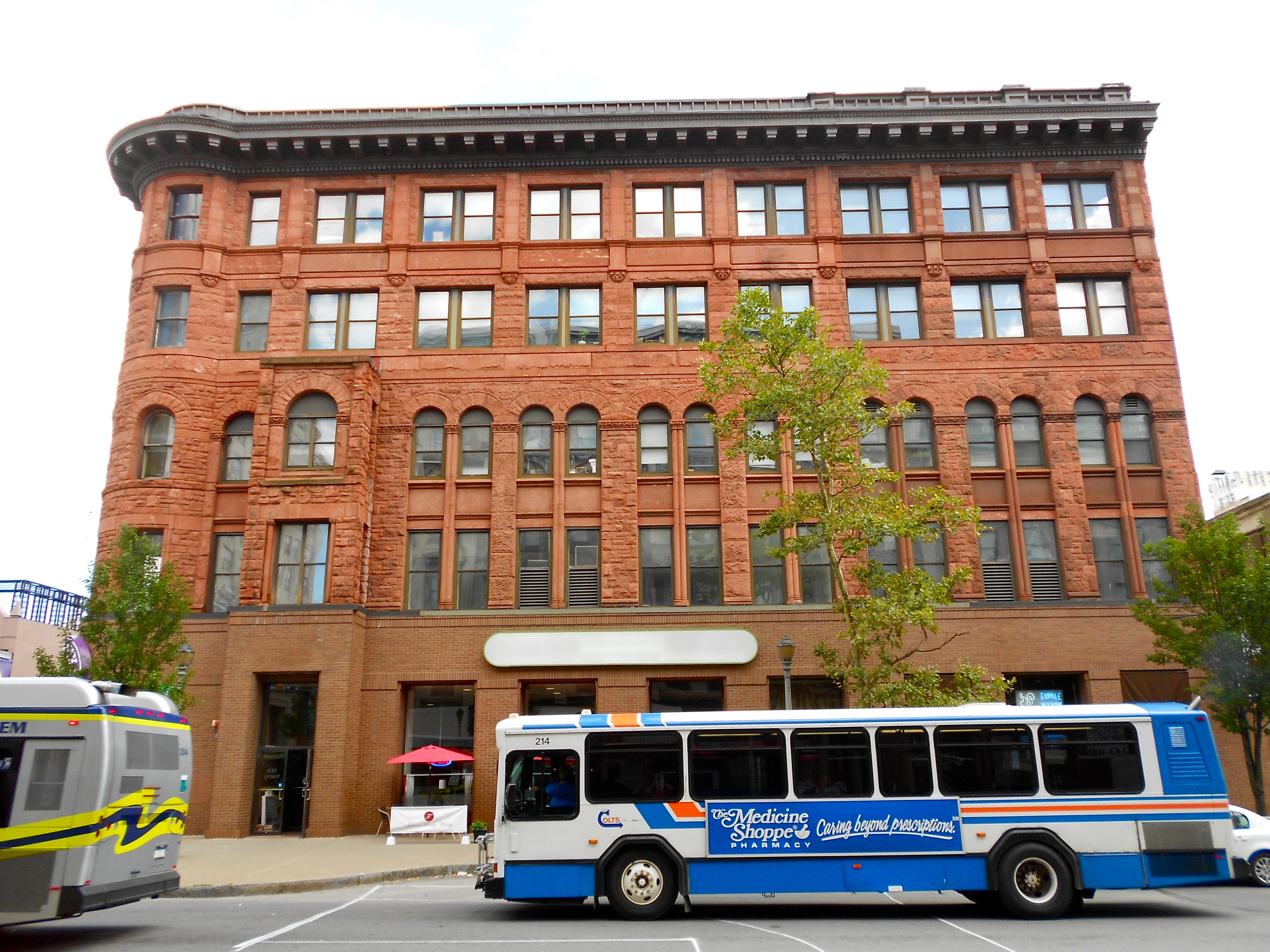
View from the southwest
