= Grand Army of the Republic Building (Scranton, Pennsylvania) =

- U.S. National Register of Historic Places
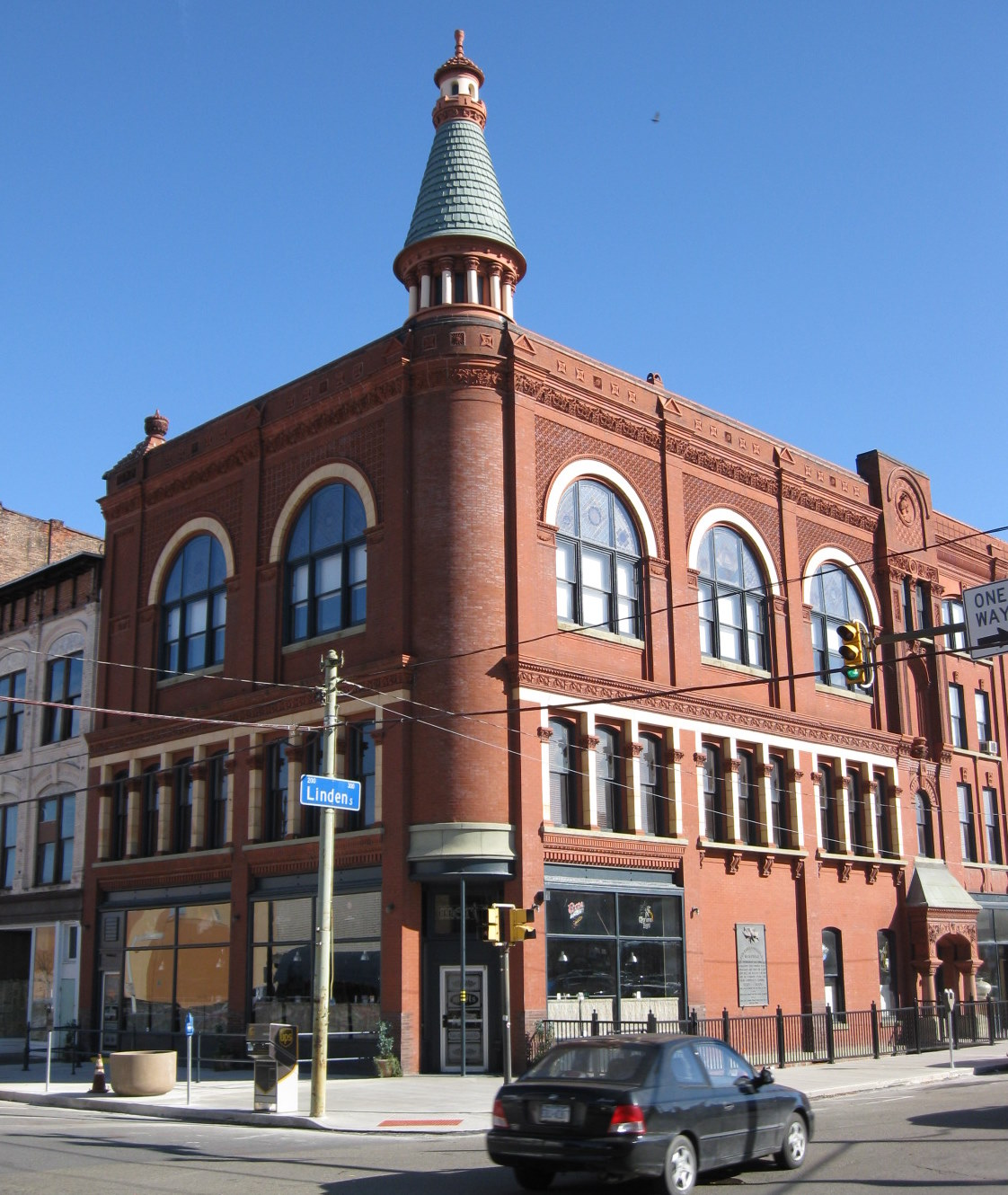
- Grand Army of the Republic Building, November 2009

- Location within Pennsylvania Location within the United States
- Location: 303 Linden St., Scranton, Pennsylvania
- Coordinates: 41°24′39″N 75°39′55″W
- Area: 0.5 acres (0.20 ha)
- Built: 1886
- Architect: Duckworth, John
- Architectural style: Romanesque
- NRHP reference No.: 84003416
- Added to NRHP: May 17, 1984

The Grand Army of the Republic Building is an historic Grand Army of the Republic building, which is located in Scranton, Lackawanna County, Pennsylvania.

It was added to the National Register of Historic Places in 1984.

== History and architectural features ==
Built in 1886, the Grand Army of the Republic Building in Scranton, Pennsylvania is a red brick and granite building that was designed in the Romanesque Revival-style.

It consists of two sections: a three-story with full basement section measuring forty feet by sixty feet, and a forty feet by thirty-four feet section with four stories and a full basement. It features a porch with red granite columns, a carved brick archway, an ornate carved brick cornice, cast stone arches, and corner turret with round cupola and finial rising to a height of ninety feet. It originally housed a hotel and Masonic Temple, but was purchased by the Grand Army of the Republic in 1901.

It was added to the National Register of Historic Places in 1984.

== Gallery ==
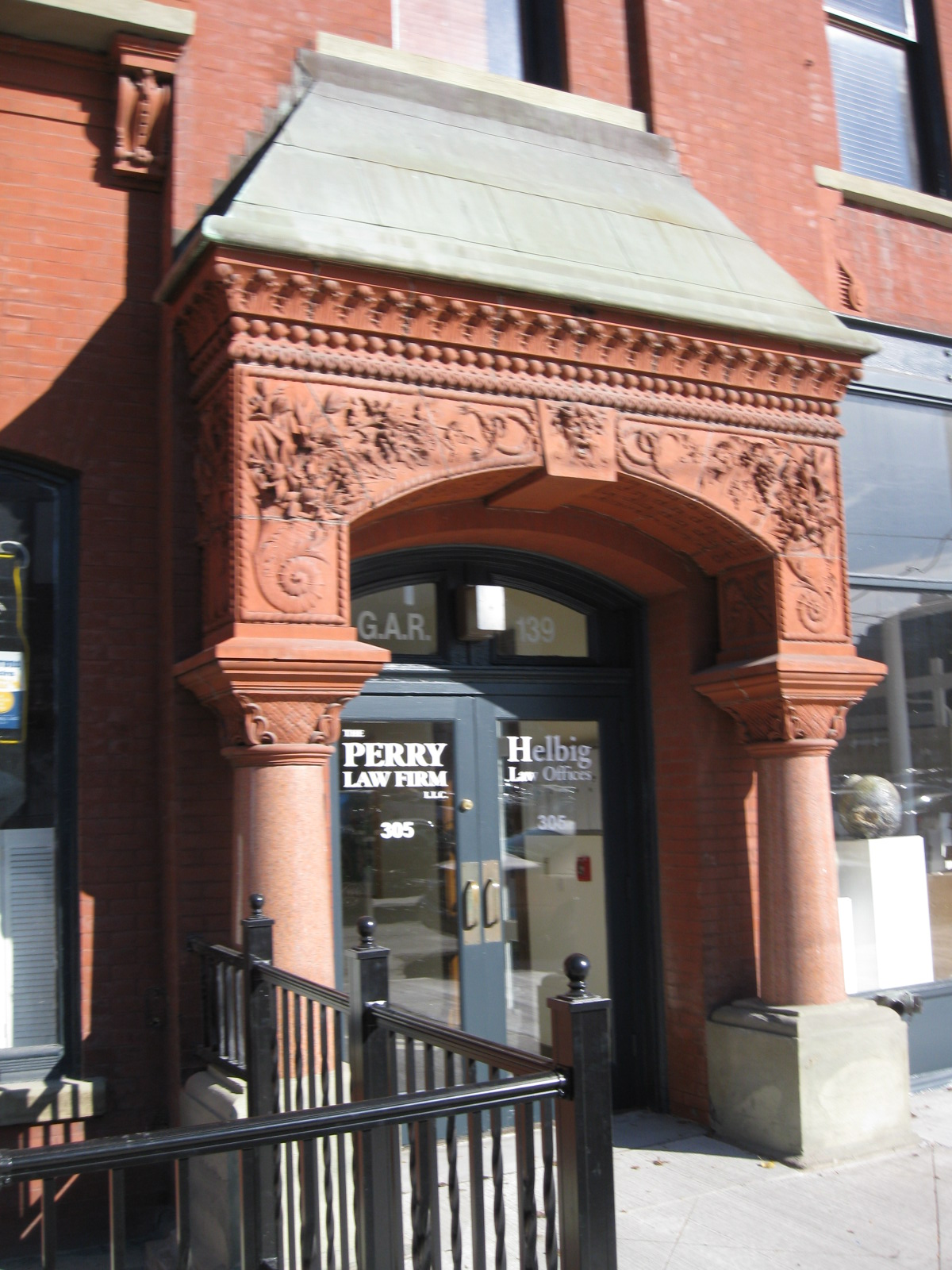
Carved brick doorway

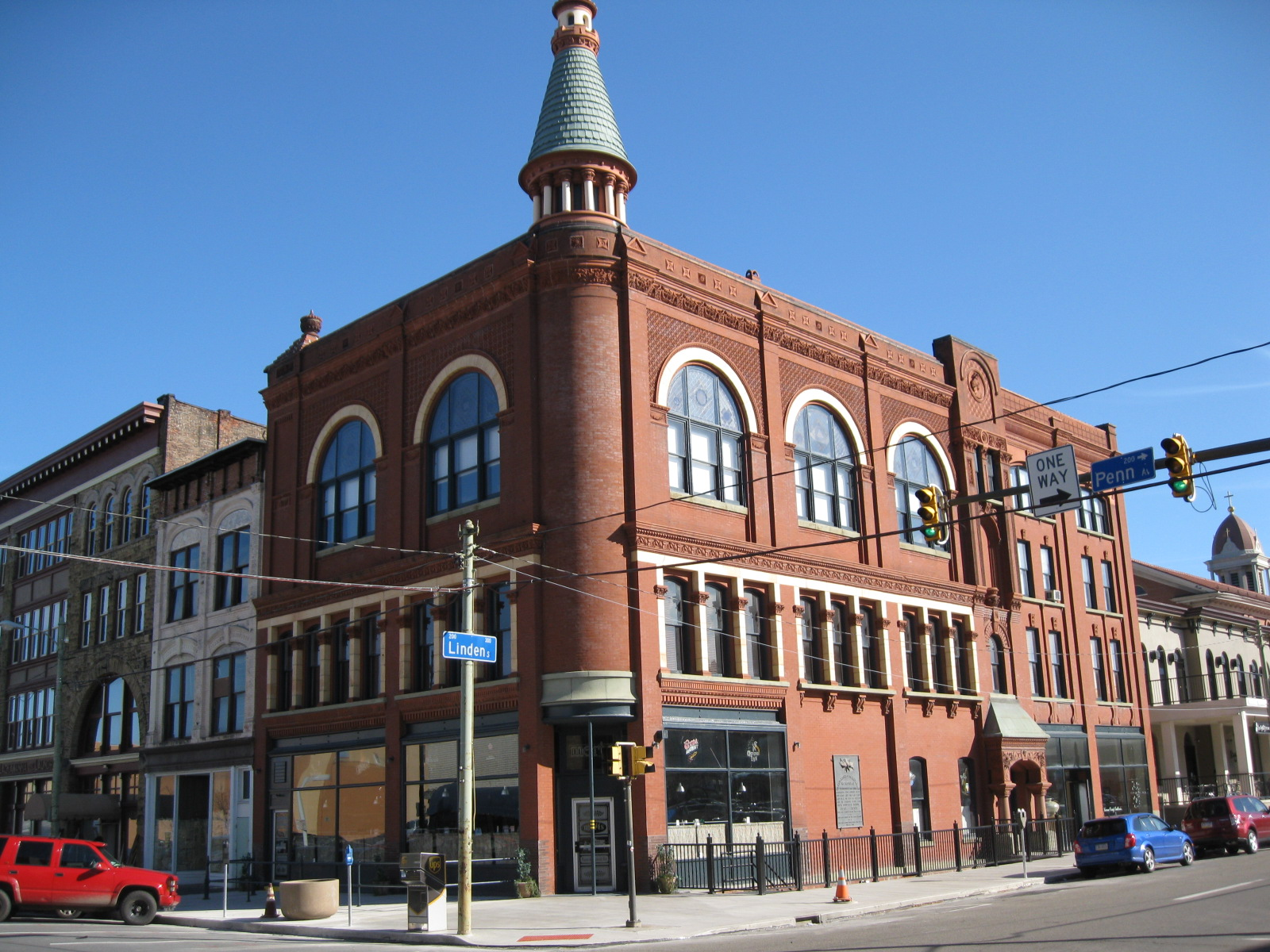
