= Florence Apartments =

- U.S. National Register of Historic Places
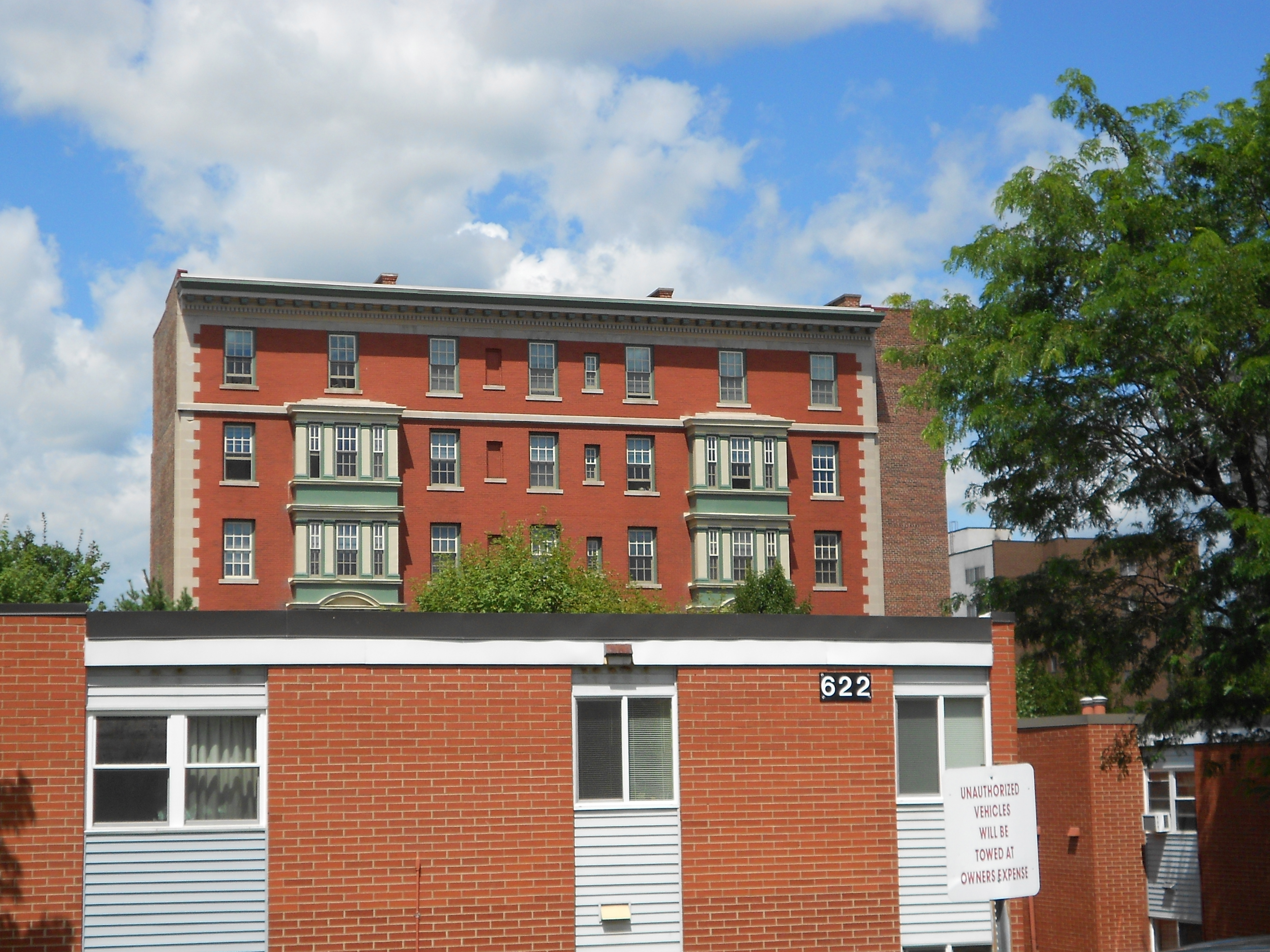
- in 2013 with surrounding low-rise apartments

- Location within Pennsylvania Location within the United States
- Location: 643 Adams Ave., Scranton, Pennsylvania
- Coordinates: 41°24′46″N 75°39′24″W
- Area: 0.6 acres (0.24 ha)
- Built: 1908
- Architect: Kaufman, Edwin
- Architectural style: Colonial Revival
- NRHP reference No.: 84003412
- Added to NRHP: January 5, 1984

Florence Apartments is a historic apartment building located at Scranton, Lackawanna County, Pennsylvania. It was built in 1908, and is a six-story, U-shaped building with Colonial Revival style design details. It has a steel and concrete structure with exterior limestone on the first and second stories and brick above. The front facade features two three-story rectangular bays clad in pressed metal and the main entrance is surrounded by two Tuscan order columns supporting an entablature inscribed with the name "Florence." It was the first multi-story apartment building in Scranton.

It was added to the National Register of Historic Places in 1984.
