= James Madison School =

- U.S. National Register of Historic Places
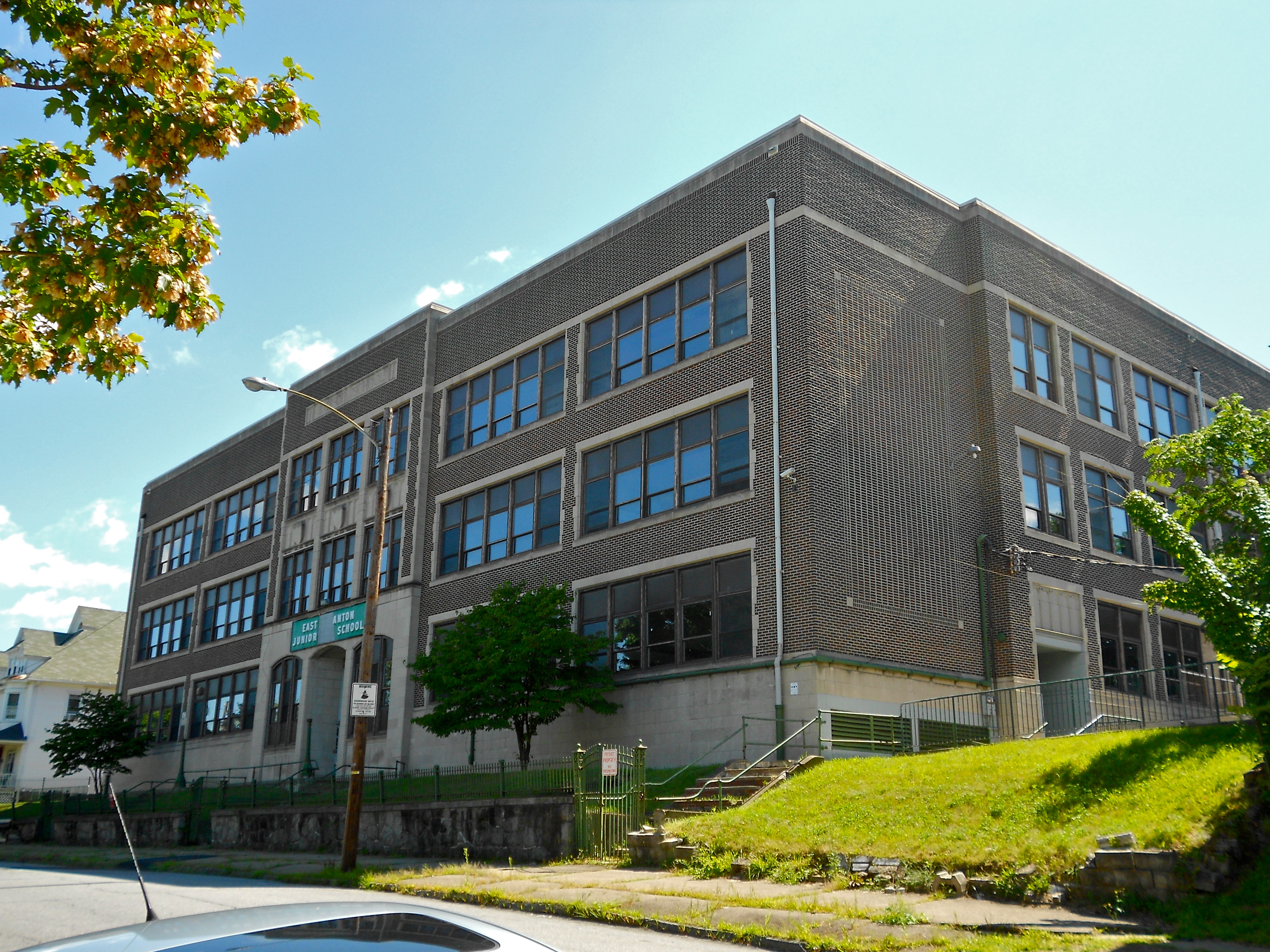
- The former school in 2013

- Location within Pennsylvania Location within the United States
- Location: 528 Quincy Ave., Scranton, Pennsylvania
- Coordinates: 41°24′30″N 75°39′11″W
- Area: less than one acre
- Built: 1927–1928
- Architect: Arthur P. Coon, Alaimo Brothers
- Architectural style: Late Gothic Revival, Classical Revival
- MPS: Educational Resources of Pennsylvania MPS
- NRHP reference No.: 09000463
- Added to NRHP: June 24, 2009

The James Madison School, also known as the East Scranton Intermediate School and East Scranton Junior High School, is an historic school building in Scranton, Lackawanna County, Pennsylvania, United States.

It was added to the National Register of Historic Places in 2009.

== History and architectural features ==
Built between 1927 and 1928, this historic structure is a three-story, C-shaped, steel frame, brick, and reinforced concrete building that was designed in an eclectic, Late Gothic Revival/Classical Revival style. It measures approximately 105 feet by 165 feet and has a flat roof. The building has undergone little alteration since it original construction.

In 2015, the building was renovated to house an early childhood learning program, as well as apartments for graduate students at the University of Scranton.
