= Lackawanna Avenue Commercial Historic District =

Historic district in Pennsylvania, United States

- U.S. National Register of Historic Places
- U.S. Historic district
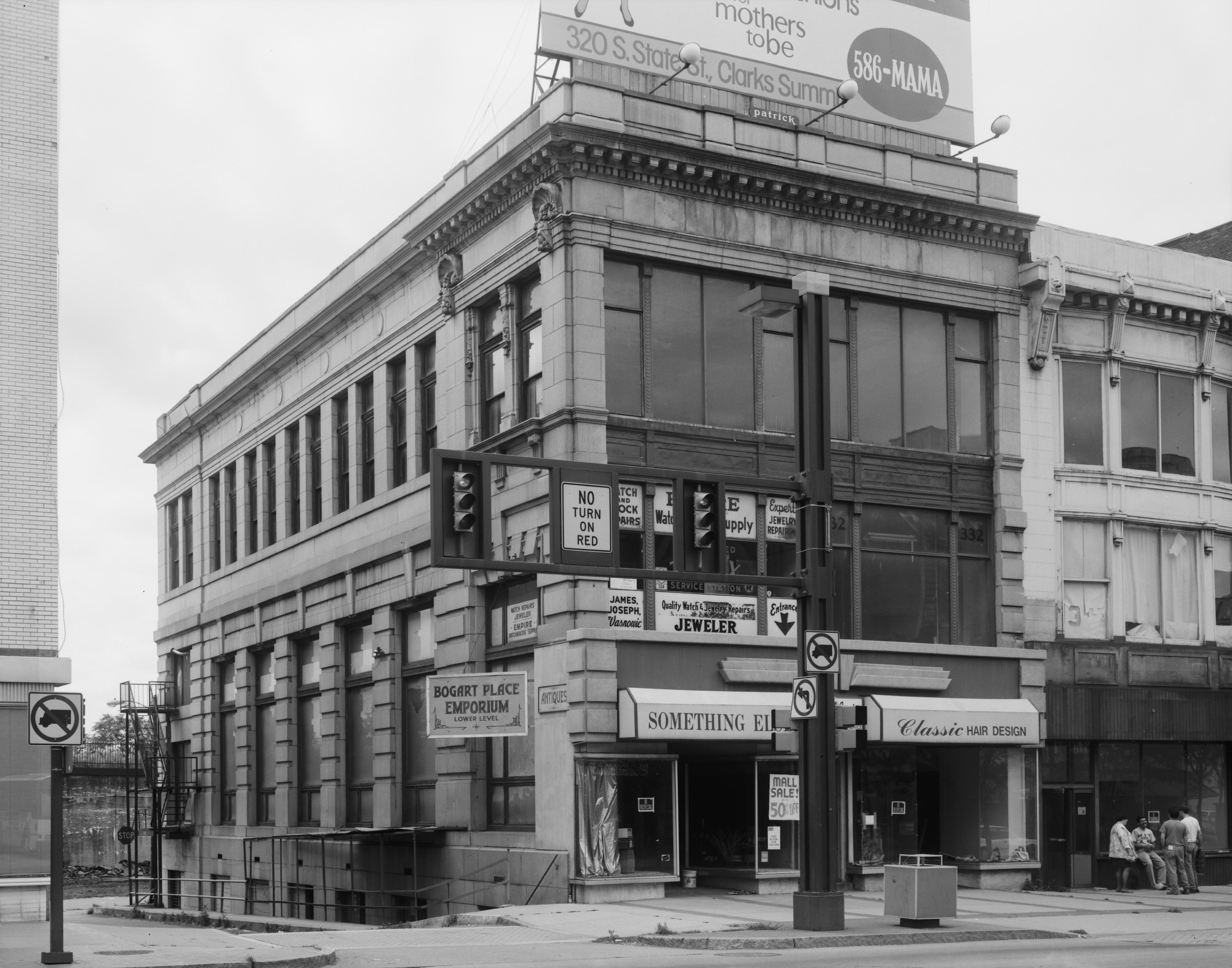
- 332–334 Lackawanna Avenue, Lackawanna Avenue Commercial Historic District, 1989

- Location within Pennsylvania Location within the United States
- Location: Roughly bounded by Adams, Franklin, Bogart Pl., and Biden Sts., Scranton, Pennsylvania
- Coordinates: 41°24′27″N 75°39′55″W
- Area: 18.5 acres (7.5 ha)
- Built: 1860
- Architectural style: Classical Revival, Late Victorian, Art Deco
- NRHP reference No.: 83004215
- Added to NRHP: November 10, 1983

Lackawanna Avenue Commercial Historic District is a national historic district located in Scranton, Lackawanna County, Pennsylvania. It encompasses 69 contributing buildings in a variety of architectural styles, including Late Victorian, Classical Revival, and Art Deco. The buildings are mostly three to four stories in height and three to five bays wide. Located in the district and separately listed is the Dime Bank Building.

It was added to the National Register of Historic Places in 1983.
