= Tripp Family Homestead =

Historic house in Pennsylvania, United States

- U.S. National Register of Historic Places
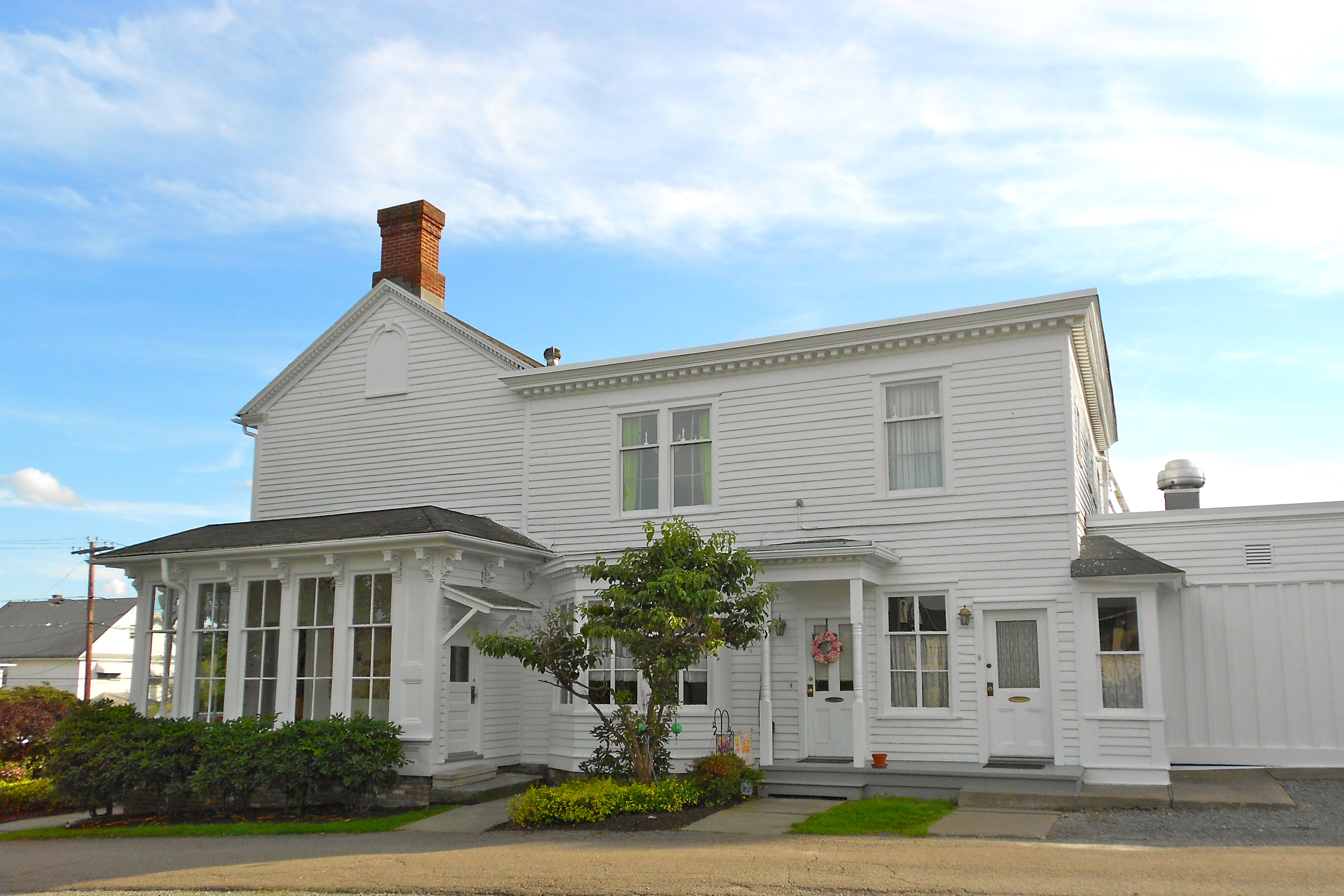

- Location within Pennsylvania Location within the United States
- Location: 1011 N. Main Ave., Scranton, Pennsylvania
- Coordinates: 41°25′36″N 75°40′12″W
- Area: 1 acre (0.40 ha)
- Built: 1812
- Architectural style: Federal
- NRHP reference No.: 72001126
- Added to NRHP: June 19, 1972

The Tripp Family Homestead, also known as the "Tripp House", is an historic house that is located at 1101 N. Main Avenue in Scranton, Lackawanna County, Pennsylvania, United States.

The house was added to the National Register of Historic Places in 1972.

== History and architectural features ==
The oldest portion of the house was built circa 1771 by Isaac Tripp, Scranton's first settler. Isaac Tripp II began later modification circa 1778; Isaac Tripp III further renovated the home in 1812, which left the building in a Federal style. The building stayed in the Tripp family until 1900 and is the oldest building in Lackawanna County. It is open as a special events facility.
