= Greigsville and Pearl Creek Railroad =

New York railroad

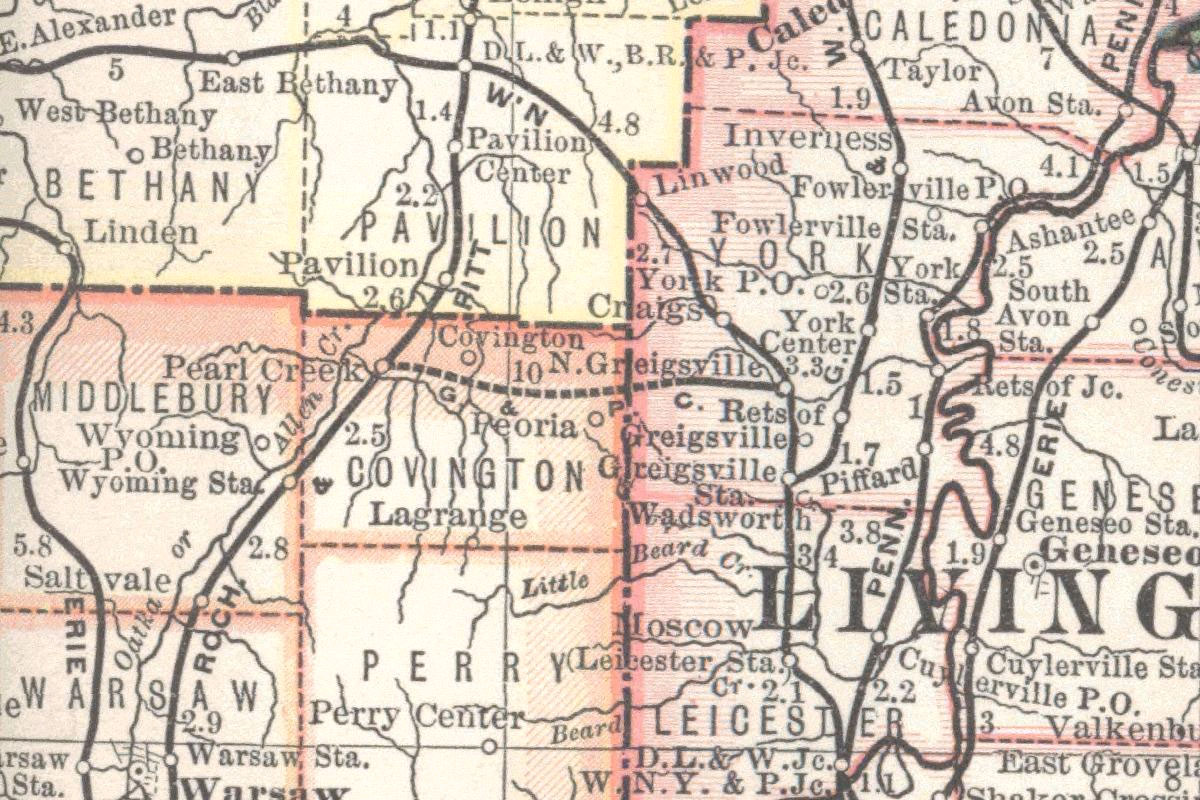
1903 map

The Greigsville and Pearl Creek Railroad was a railroad in the U.S. state of New York. Despite its name, it only existed in the immediate vicinity of Greigsville, a small community in the town of York, and did not reach Pearl Creek, a hamlet in Covington.

== History ==
The company was organized October 1, 1897 and chartered January 26, 1898, to build from the Delaware, Lackawanna and Western Railroad's main line at North Greigsville (present-day Greigsville) west to the Buffalo, Rochester and Pittsburgh Railway at Pearl Creek. Three miles (5 km) were constructed from the DL&W to the Greigsville Salt Mine, but the mine closed in June 1899, and operations were suspended.

The actual location of Greigsville Salt Mine is not clear. Mindat puts the mine on a residential street (Virginia Avenue), but the USGS Topographic map puts the mine at the end of an unnamed road to the northwest. The railroad would have extended past the mine by at least the length of one train, in order to be able to load the entire train from one point.
