= Delaware Valley Railway (1901–1937) =

Former railway in Pennsylvania, the United States

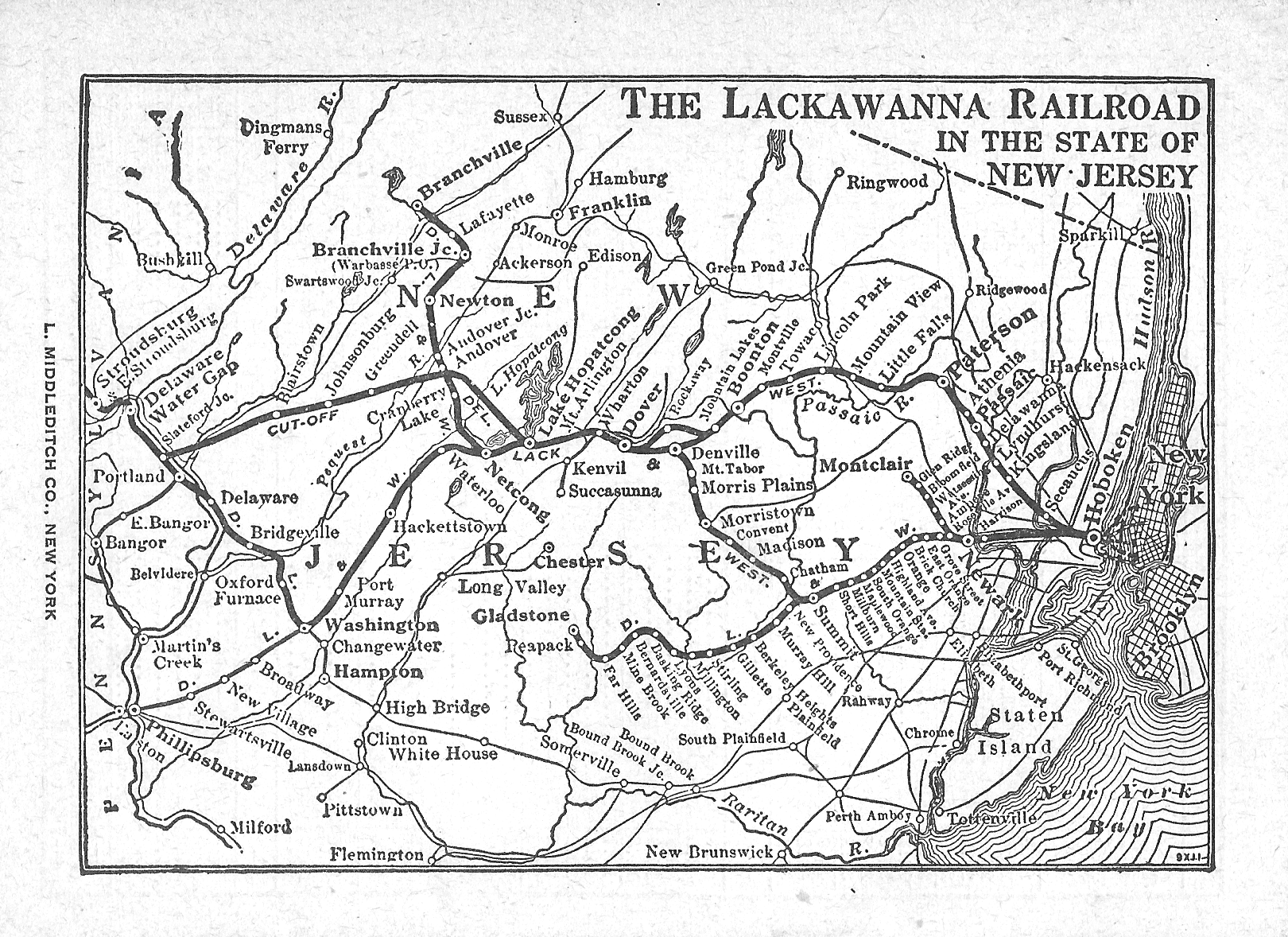
- The DV Railway can be seen near the top left corner on this DL&W map, running from Stroudsburg north to Bushkill.

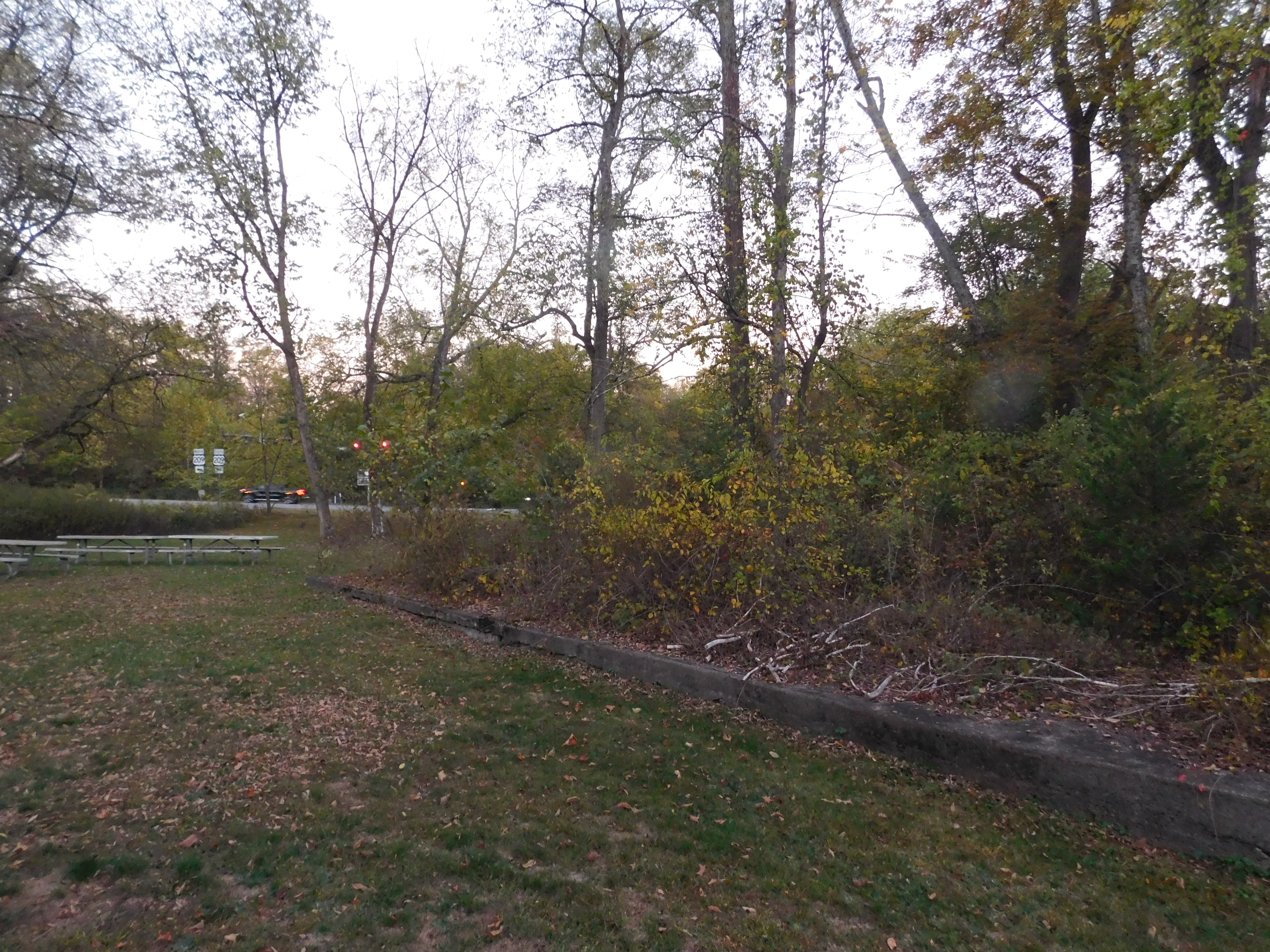
- The former platform of the Bushkill station of the Delaware Valley Railway in October 2025.

Overview
- Locale: Delaware Water Gap north into the Minisink
- Dates of operation: 1901–1937

Technical
- Track gauge: 4 ft 8 1/2 in (1,435 mm) standard gauge
- Length: 12 mi (19.31 km)

The Delaware Valley Railway was an American railroad that ran from East Stroudsburg, Pennsylvania in Monroe County north along the Delaware River Valley to Bushkill in Pike County from 1901 to 1937. The railroad began as a project to link Stroudsburg with Port Jervis, New York to the north, with plans to transport coal to New England via the new link through the Minisink. Initial grading on the route began in the 1890s, but it wasn't until 1901 that the newly organized railroad purchased a locomotive and began construction proper, branching off from the Delaware, Lackawanna, and Western Railroad at East Stroudsburg. Facing a severe financial downturn, the railroad filed with the Interstate Commerce Commission to abandon the line in 1937 after clearing forty dollars in profit in its first two months of the year. Assets were sold off at a price of $30,600.

Part of the former right of way in Bushkill is now a trail within the Delaware Water Gap National Recreation Area administered by the National Park Service called the Railway Avenue Trail.

== Bibliography ==
- Jacques, Michelle; Beljean, John (2017). Delaware Valley Railway: 1901-1937 (Images of Rail). Charleston, South Carolina: Arcadia Publishing. ISBN 9781467126151.
