= Delaware, Lackawanna and Western Railroad =

Former U.S. Class 1 railroad

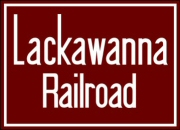
- Map of the rail lines of DL&W Railroad

Overview
- Headquarters: Scranton, Pennsylvania, U.S.
- Reporting mark: DLW
- Locale: Pennsylvania; New York; New Jersey
- Dates of operation: 1851–1960
- Successor: Erie Lackawanna Railroad

Technical
- Track gauge: 4 ft 8 1/2 in (1,435 mm) standard gauge
- Previous gauge: 6 ft (1,829 mm)
- Length: 998 miles (1,606 kilometers)

The Delaware, Lackawanna and Western Railroad, also known as the DL&W or Lackawanna Railroad, was a U.S. Class 1 railroad that connected Buffalo, New York, and Hoboken, New Jersey, and by ferry with New York City, a distance of 395 miles (636 km). The railroad was incorporated in Pennsylvania in 1853 from the merger of two smaller railroads, and was created primarily to provide a means of transport for anthracite coal from the Coal Region in Northeast Pennsylvania to large coal markets in New York City. The railroad gradually expanded both east and west, and eventually linked Buffalo with New York City.

Like most coal-focused railroads in Northeastern Pennsylvania, including Lehigh Valley Railroad, New York, Ontario and Western Railroad, and the Lehigh & New England Railroad, the DL&W was profitable during the first half of the 20th century, but its margins were gradually hurt by declining Pennsylvania coal traffic, especially following the 1959 Knox Mine Disaster and competition from trucks following the expansion of the Interstate Highway System in the 1960s and 1970s. In 1960, the DL&W merged with rival Erie Railroad to form the Erie Lackawanna Railroad that would be taken over by Conrail in 1976.

== History ==
=== Pre-DL&W (1832–1853) ===
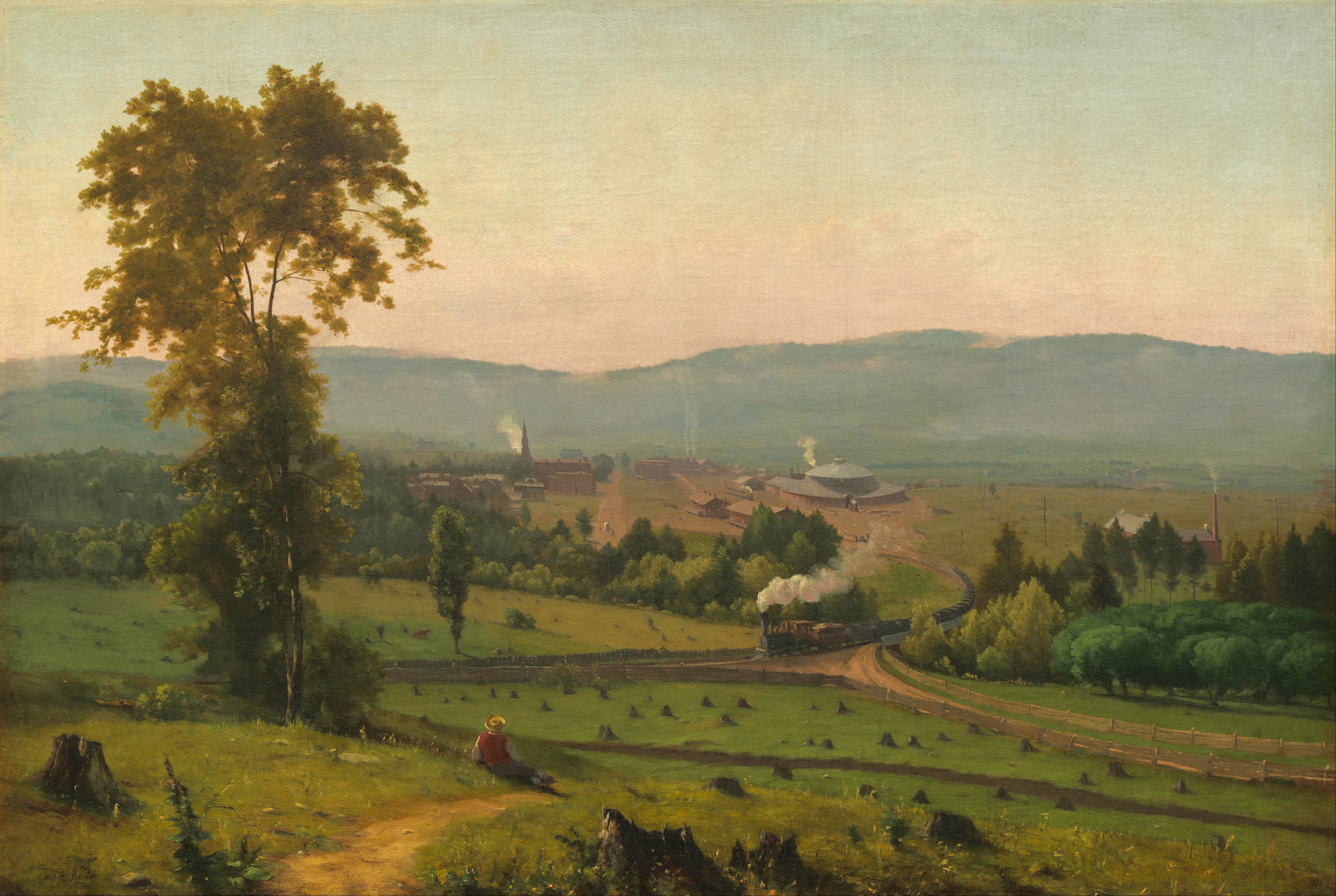
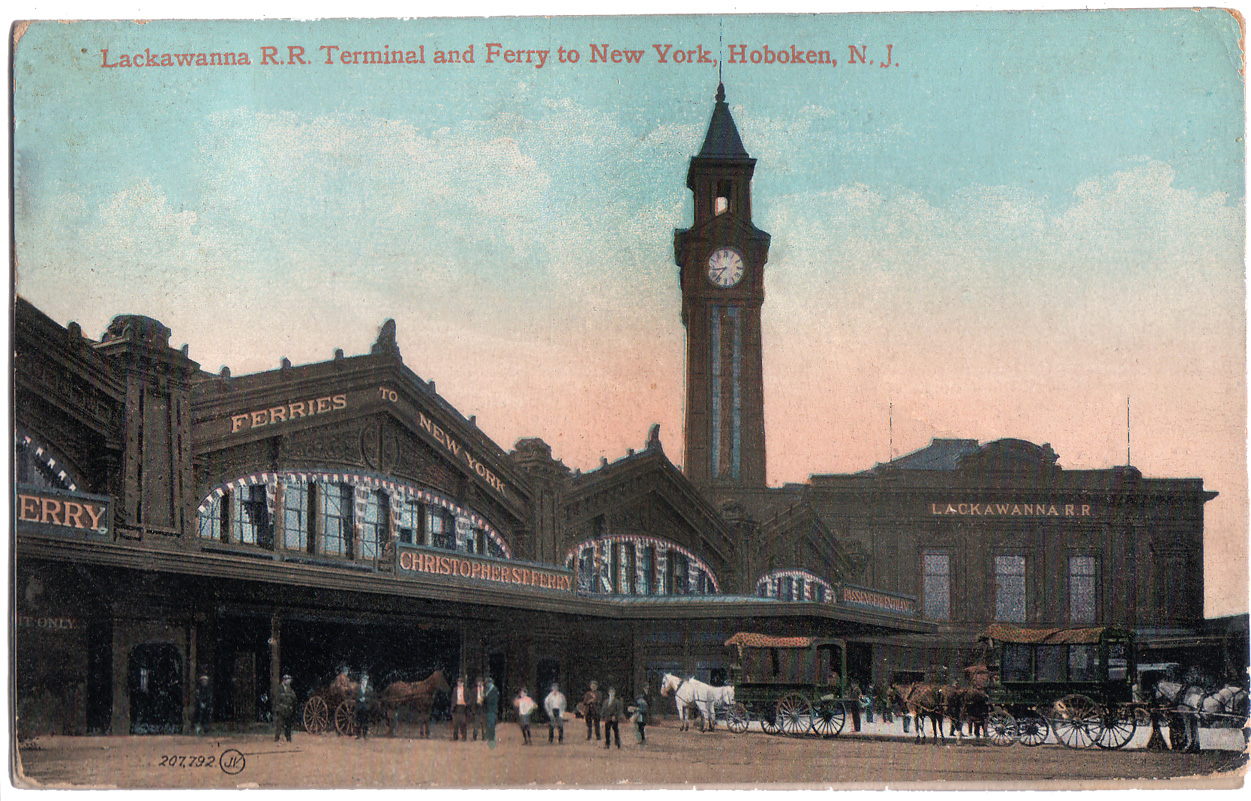
Left: The Lackawanna Valley, a painting by George Inness, depicting a westbound Delaware, Lackawanna and Western Railroad train from Scranton, Pennsylvania, in 1855, four years after the railroad began operations. The roundhouse sits on the present-day site of Steamtown National Historic Site; the forge of Lackawanna Iron & Coal Co. and Lackawanna Avenue are depicted in the background. The portrait is now on display at the National Gallery of Art in Washington, D.C. Right: the railroad's Hoboken Terminal in Hoboken, New Jersey, the last active railroad terminal on the Hudson River, which has been named a nationally-recognized historic site.

Delaware, Lackawanna and Western Railroad was first incorporated as Leggett's Gap Railroad on April 7, 1832, though it was dormant for several years following its incorporation. The company was chartered on March 14, 1849, and organized on January 2, 1850. On April 14, 1851, its name was changed to Lackawanna and Western Railroad. The line opened on December 20, 1851, and ran north from Scranton, Pennsylvania, to Great Bend, Pennsylvania, just south of Pennsylvania's border with New York state. From Great Bend, the railroad obtained trackage rights north and west over the New York and Erie Rail Road to Owego, New York, where it leased the Cayuga and Susquehanna Railroad to Ithaca on Cayuga Lake on April 21, 1855.

The C&S was the reorganized and partially rebuilt Ithaca and Owego Railroad, which had opened on April 1, 1834, and was the oldest part of its system. The whole system was built to 6 ft (1,829 mm) broad gauge, the same as the New York and Erie, although the original I&O was built to standard gauge and converted to wide gauge when rebuilt as the C&S.

The "Delaware and Cobb's Gap Railroad" was chartered December 4, 1850, to build a line from Scranton east to the Delaware River. Before it opened, the Delaware and Cobb's Gap and Lackawanna and Western were consolidated by the Lackawanna Steel Company into one company, the "Delaware, Lackawanna and Western Railroad", on March 11, 1853. On the New Jersey side of the Delaware River, the Warren Railroad was chartered on February 12, 1851, to continue from the bridge over the river southeast to Hampton, on the Central Railroad of New Jersey. That section got its name from Warren County, the county through which it would primarily run.

=== Expansion and profits (1853–1940) ===
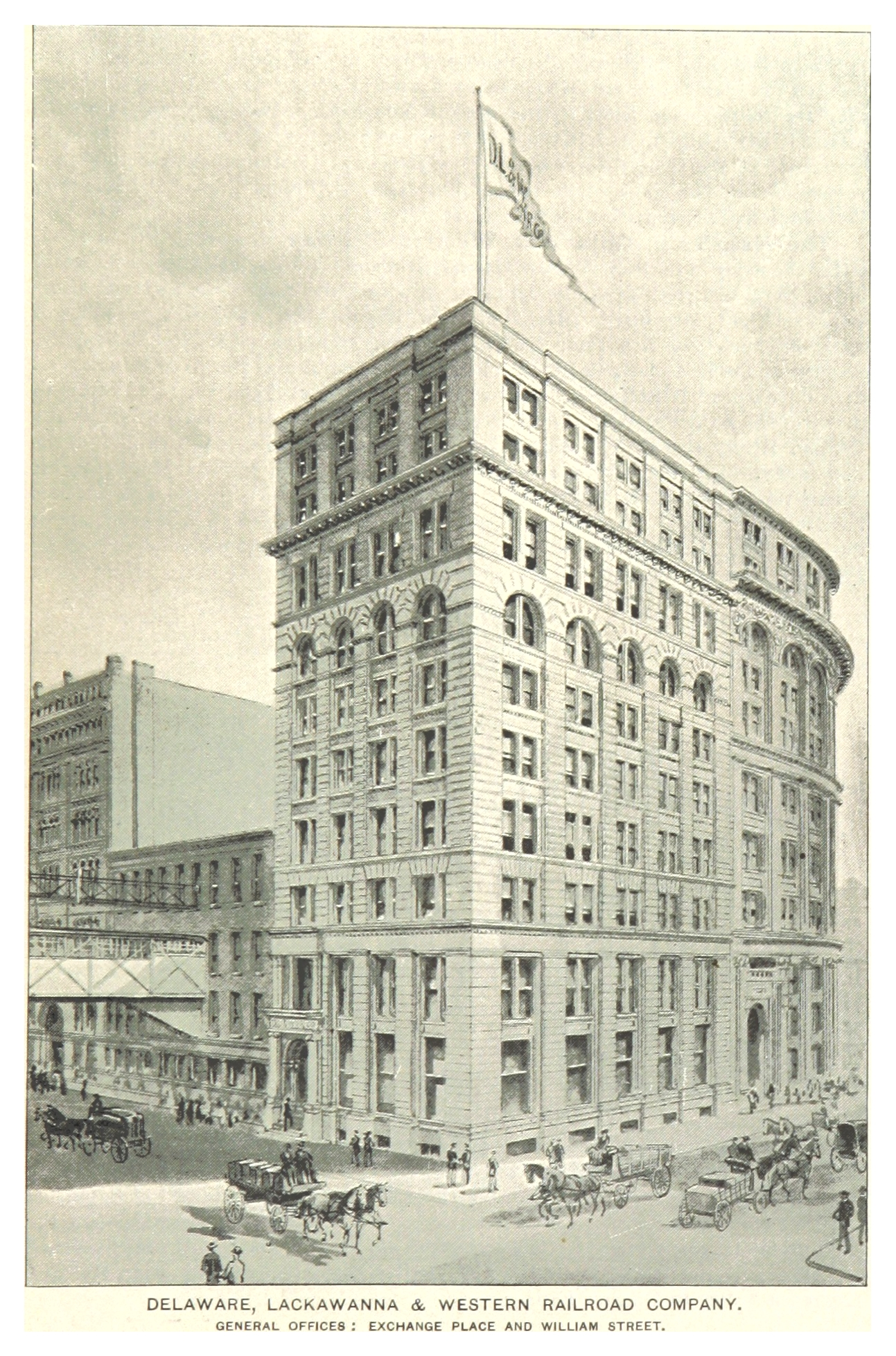
The railroad's offices in Manhattan in 1893

The rest of the line, now known as the Southern Division, opened on May 27, 1856, including the Warren Railroad in New Jersey. A third rail was added to the standard gauge Central Railroad of New Jersey east of Hampton to allow the railroad to run east to Elizabeth via trackage rights (the CNJ was extended in 1864 to Jersey City).

On December 10, 1868, the company acquired the Morris and Essex Railroad unit. In 1945, it was fully merged into the DL&W. This line ran east–west across northern New Jersey, crossing the Warren Railroad at Washington and providing access to Jersey City without depending on the CNJ. The M&E tunnel under Bergen Hill opened in 1876, relieving the Morris and Essex Railroad and its owners, the Delaware, Lackawanna and Western Railroad, from having to use the New York, Lake Erie and Western Railway's tunnel to reach Jersey City. Along with the M&E lease came several branch lines in New Jersey, including the Boonton Line, which opened in 1870 and bypassed Newark for through freight.

The railroad acquired the Syracuse, Binghamton and New York Railroad in 1869 and leased the Oswego and Syracuse Railroad on February 13, 1869. This gave it a branch from Binghamton north and northwest via Syracuse to Oswego, a port on Lake Ontario. The "Greene Railroad" was organized in 1869, opened in 1870, and was immediately leased to the company, providing a short branch off the Oswego line from Chenango Forks to Greene. Also in 1870, the company leased the Utica, Chenango and Susquehanna Valley Railway, continuing this branch north to Utica, with a branch from Richfield Junction to Richfield Springs (fully opened in 1872).

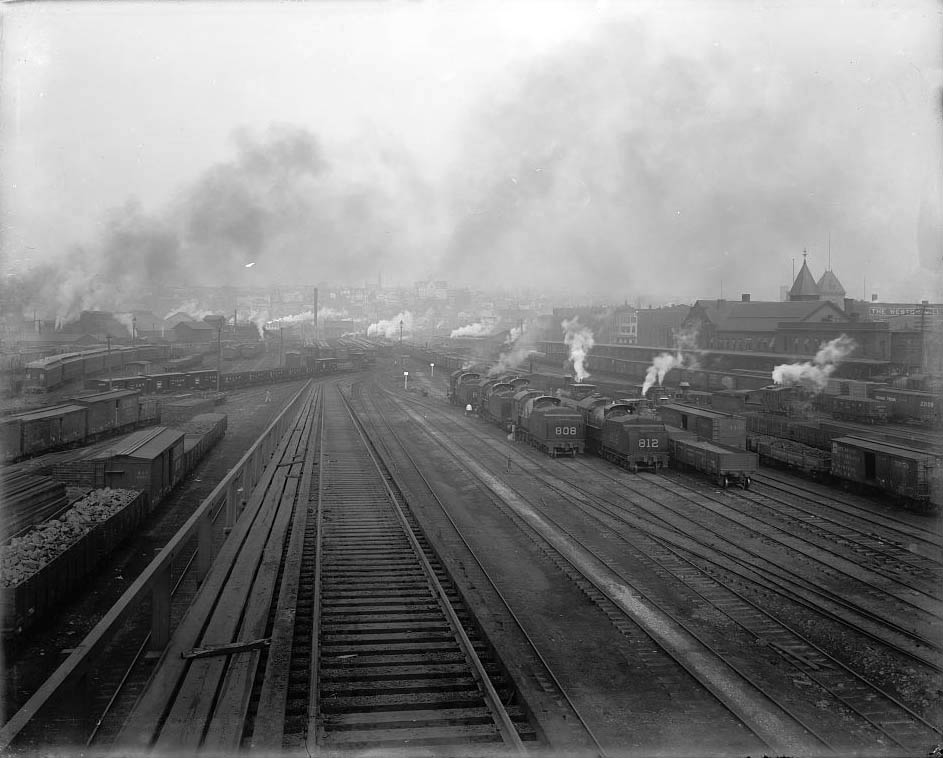
The Delaware, Lackawanna and Western Railroad yards in Scranton, Pennsylvania, a hub of the Pennsylvania coal mining industry, c. 1895

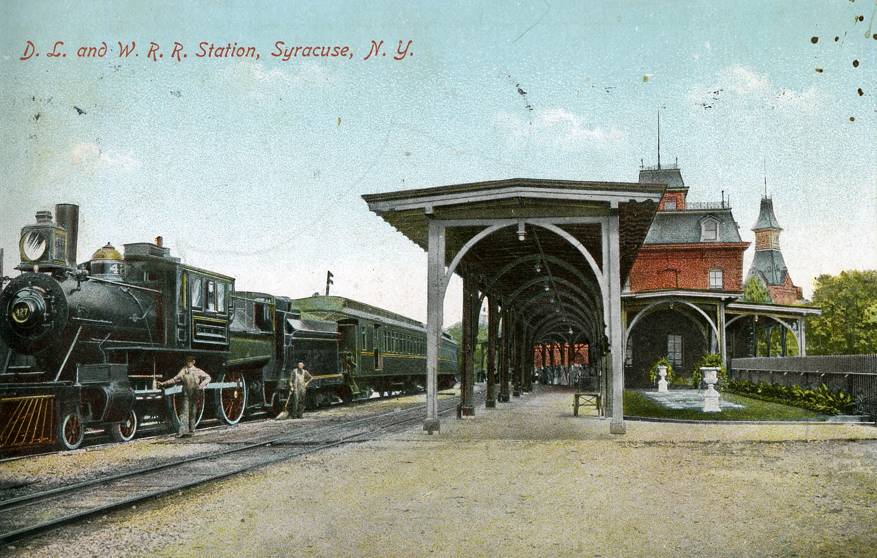
A Delaware, Lackawanna and Western Railroad train at Syracuse station in Syracuse, New York, c. 1910

The "Valley Railroad" was organized March 3, 1869, to connect the end of the original line at Great Bend, Pennsylvania, to Binghamton, New York, avoiding reliance on the Erie. The new line opened on October 1, 1871. By 1873, the company controlled the Lackawanna and Bloomsburg Railroad, a branch from Scranton southwest to Northumberland with trackage rights over the Pennsylvania Railroad's Northern Central Railway to Sunbury. On March 15, 1876, the whole system was re-gauged to standard gauge in one day. The New York, Lackawanna and Western Railroad was chartered on August 26, 1880, and opened on September 17, 1882, to continue the railroad from Binghamton west and northwest to Buffalo. The main line ran to the International Bridge to Ontario, and a branch served downtown Buffalo. A spur from Wayland served Hornellsville (Hornell). On December 1, 1903, the company began operating the Erie and Central New York Railroad, a branch of the Oswego line from Cortland Junction east to Cincinnatus. That same year, it also began to control the Bangor and Portland Railway. By 1909, the company controlled the Bangor and Portland Railway. This line branched from the main line at Portland, southwest to Nazareth, with a branch to Martins Creek. The Delaware Valley Railway was organized with visions of linking the Lackawanna north to the Erie Railroad at Port Jervis, New York beginning with plans in 1893 and construction in 1901. Trains ran north from East Stroudsburg only as far as Bushkill, and the twelve-mile line was abandoned in 1937.

The primary locomotive and car shops were located in Scranton. In 1910 they were enlarged and upgraded at a cost of $2 million, including a massive machine and erecting shop measuring 582 by 342 feet. To handle the increasing roster of coal and other freight cars, new car shops were built outside Scranton at Keyser Valley in 1904. A passenger car shop was added in Kingsland, New Jersey, nine miles from New York City, in 1906.

=== New terminals and realignments ===
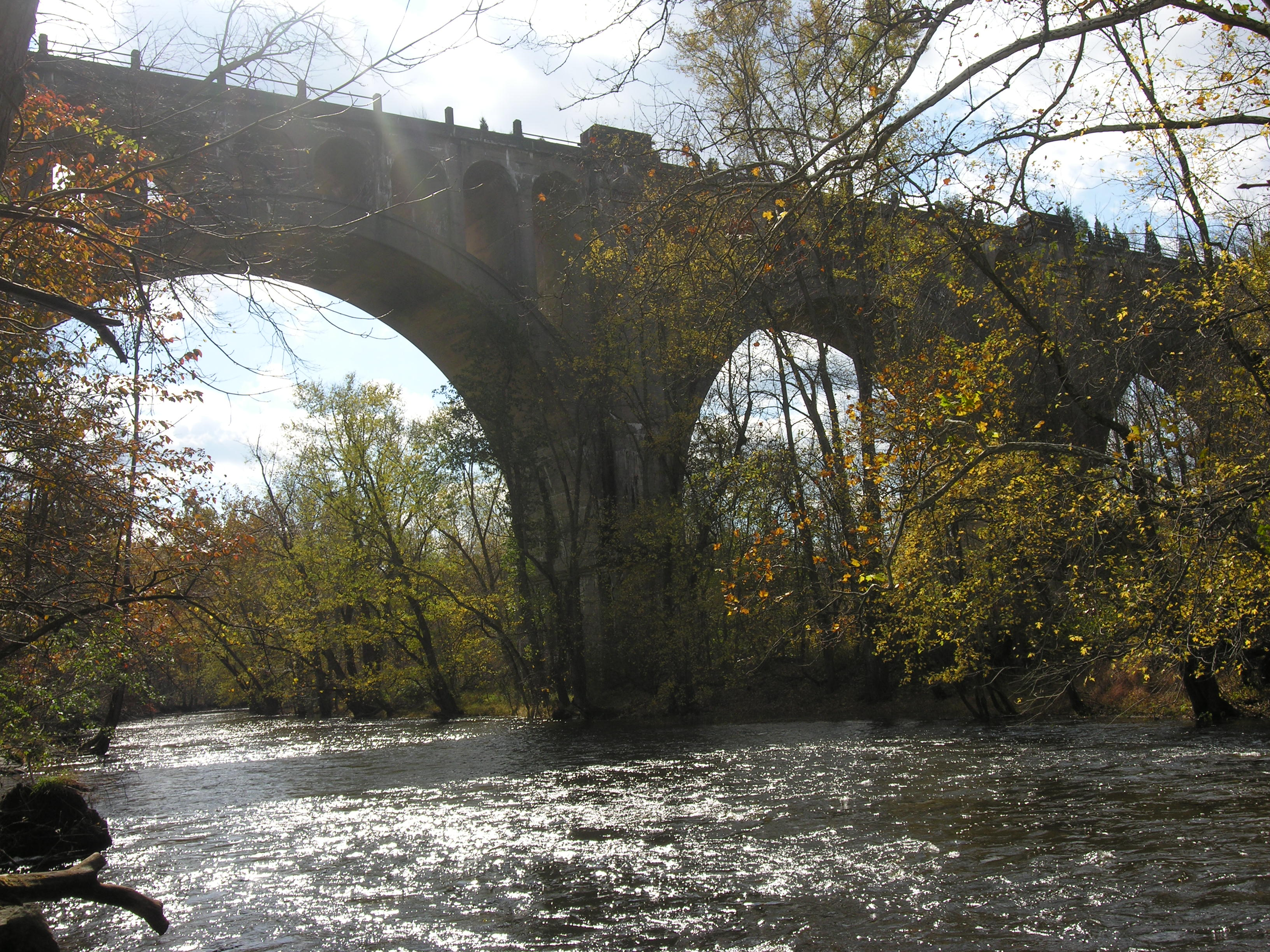
The Paulinskill Viaduct on the Lackawanna Cut-Off in Hainesburg, New Jersey, was the largest concrete bridge in the world when it was completed in 1910

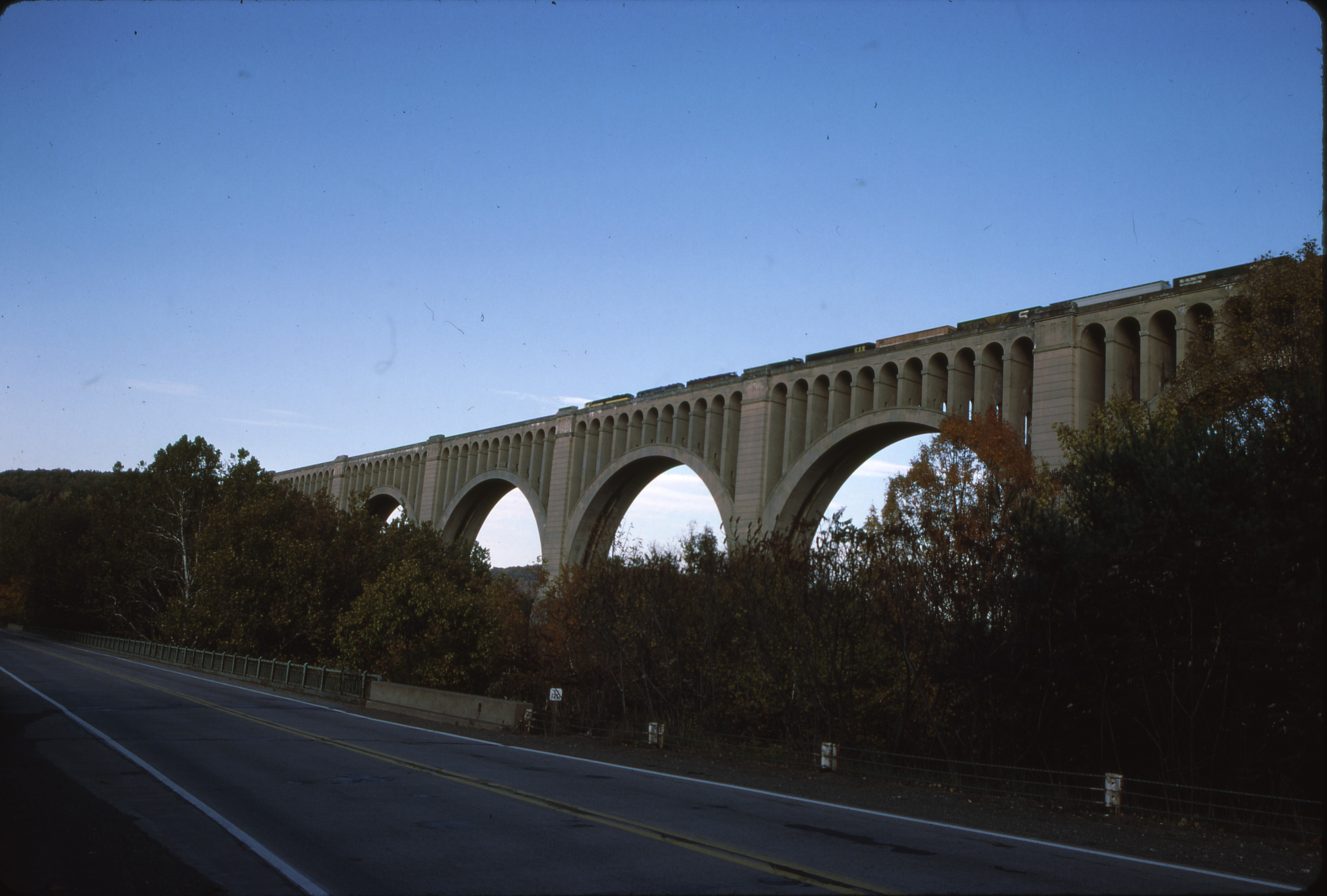
The Tunkhannock Viaduct in Nicholson, Pennsylvania, in October 1988. A Delaware & Hudson Railway train on the bridge is dwarfed by the structure, which stands 240 feet (73 m) above the creek for which it is named

The company built a Beaux-Arts terminal in Hoboken, New Jersey, in 1907, and another Beaux-Arts passenger station (now a Radisson hotel) in Scranton the following year. A new terminal was constructed on the waterfront in Buffalo in 1917.

The "Lackawanna Railroad of New Jersey", chartered on February 7, 1908, to build the Lackawanna Cut-Off (a.k.a. New Jersey Cutoff or Hopatcong-Slateford Cutoff), opened on December 24, 1911. This provided a low-grade cutoff in northwestern New Jersey. The cutoff included the Delaware River Viaduct and the Paulinskill Viaduct, as well as three concrete towers at Port Morris and Greendell in New Jersey and Slateford Junction in Pennsylvania. From 1912 to 1915, the Summit-Hallstead Cutoff (a.k.a. Pennsylvania Cutoff or Nicholson Cutoff) was built to revamp a winding and hilly system between Clarks Summit, Pennsylvania, and Hallstead, Pennsylvania. This rerouting provided another quicker low-grade line between Scranton and Binghamton. The Summit Cutoff included the massive Tunkhannock Viaduct and Martins Creek Viaduct. The Lackawanna's cutoffs had no at-grade crossings with roads or highways, allowing high-speed service.

=== Passenger operations ===
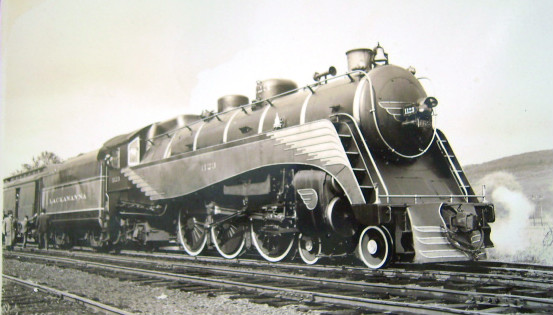
A Delaware, Lackawanna and Western Railroad streamlined steam locomotive in the 1930s

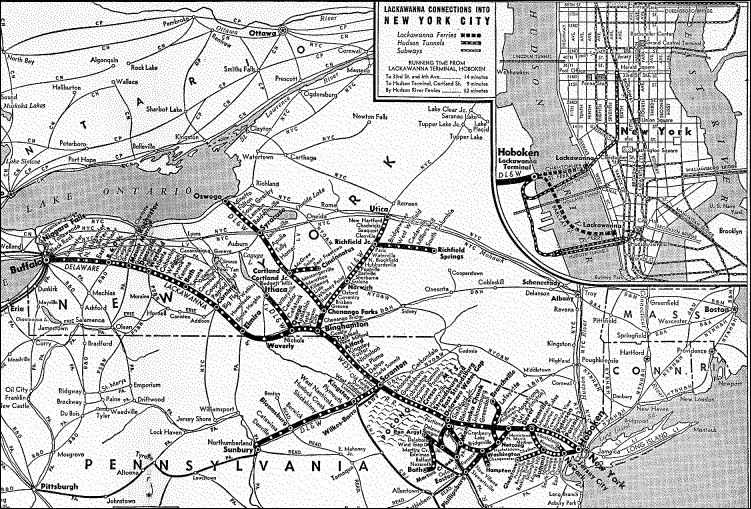
A system map for the railroad, c. 1922

The railroad ran trains from its Hoboken Terminal, its gateway to New York City, to its Scranton, Binghamton, Syracuse, Oswego, and Buffalo stations and to Utica Union Station. Noteworthy among these were:

- Nos. 2 Pocono Express / 5 Twilight (Hoboken to Buffalo with New York Central connections to Chicago)
- Nos. 3 / 6 Phoebe Snow, also known as the Lackawanna Limited (Hoboken-Buffalo)
- Nos. 7 Westerner / 8 New Yorker (Hoboken to Buffalo, with Nickel Plate Nickel Plate Limited connection to Chicago)
- Nos. 10 New York Mail / 15 Owl (Hoboken to Buffalo)
- Nos. 1301 / 1306 Interstate Express (Philadelphia to Syracuse)
- Nos. 1702 Keystone Express / 1705 Pittsburgh Express (Scranton to Pittsburgh)

The railroad also ran commuter operations from the North Jersey suburbs to Hoboken on the Boonton, Gladstone, Montclair and Morristown Lines. Early publicity for the passenger service featured a young woman, Phoebe Snow, who always wore white and kept her clothing clean while riding the "Road of Anthracite", powered by the clean-burning coal known as anthracite.

=== Decline (1940–1960) ===
The most profitable commodity shipped by the railroad was anthracite coal. In 1890 and during 1920–1940, the DL&W shipped upwards of 14% of the state of Pennsylvania's anthracite production. Other profitable freight included dairy products, cattle, lumber, cement, steel and grain. The Pocono Mountains region was one of the most popular vacation destinations in the country—especially among New Yorkers—and several large hotels sat along the line in Northeastern Pennsylvania, generating a large passenger traffic for the Lackawanna. All of this helped justify the railroad's expansion of its double-track mainline to three and in a few places four tracks.

Revenue freight traffic, in millions of net ton-miles
Year	Traffic
1925	4588
1933	2498
1944	5822
1960	2580 thru 16 Oct

Revenue passenger traffic, in millions of passenger-miles
Year	Traffic
1925	671
1933	428
1944	623
1960	226 thru 16 Oct

Changes in the region's economy undercut the railroad, however. The post-World War II boom enjoyed by many U.S. cities bypassed Scranton, Wilkes-Barre and the rest of Lackawanna and Luzerne counties. Fuel oil and natural gas quickly became the preferred energy sources. Silk and other textile industries shrank as jobs moved to the southern U.S. or overseas. The advent of mechanical refrigeration squeezed the business from ice ponds on top of the Poconos. Even the dairy industry changed. The Lackawanna had long enjoyed revenues from milk shipments; many stations had a creamery next to the tracks.

Perhaps the most catastrophic blows to the Lackawanna, however, were dealt by Mother Nature. In August 1955, flooding from Hurricane Diane devastated the Pocono Mountains region, killing 80 people. The floods cut the Lackawanna Railroad in 88 places, destroying 60 miles (97 km) of track, stranding several trains (with a number of passengers aboard) and shutting down the railroad for nearly a month (with temporary speed restrictions prevailing on the damaged sections of railroad for months), causing a total of $8.1 million in damages (equal to $97,350,932 in 2025) and lost revenue. One section, the Old River line (former Warren Railroad), was damaged beyond repair and had to be abandoned altogether. Until the mainline in Pennsylvania reopened, all trains were canceled or rerouted over other railroads. The Lackawanna would never fully recover.

In January 1959, the final nail was driven in the Lackawanna's coffin by the Knox Mine Disaster, which flooded the mines along the Susquehanna River and all but obliterated what was left of the region's anthracite industry.

The Lackawanna Railroad's financial problems were not unique. Rail traffic in the U.S. in general declined after World War II as trucks and automobiles took freight and passenger traffic. Declining freight traffic put the nearby New York, Ontario and Western Railroad and Lehigh & New England Railroad out of business in 1957 and 1961, respectively. Over the next three decades, nearly every major railroad in the Northeastern US would go bankrupt.

=== Erie merger and aftermath (1956–present) ===
==== Erie Lackawanna ====
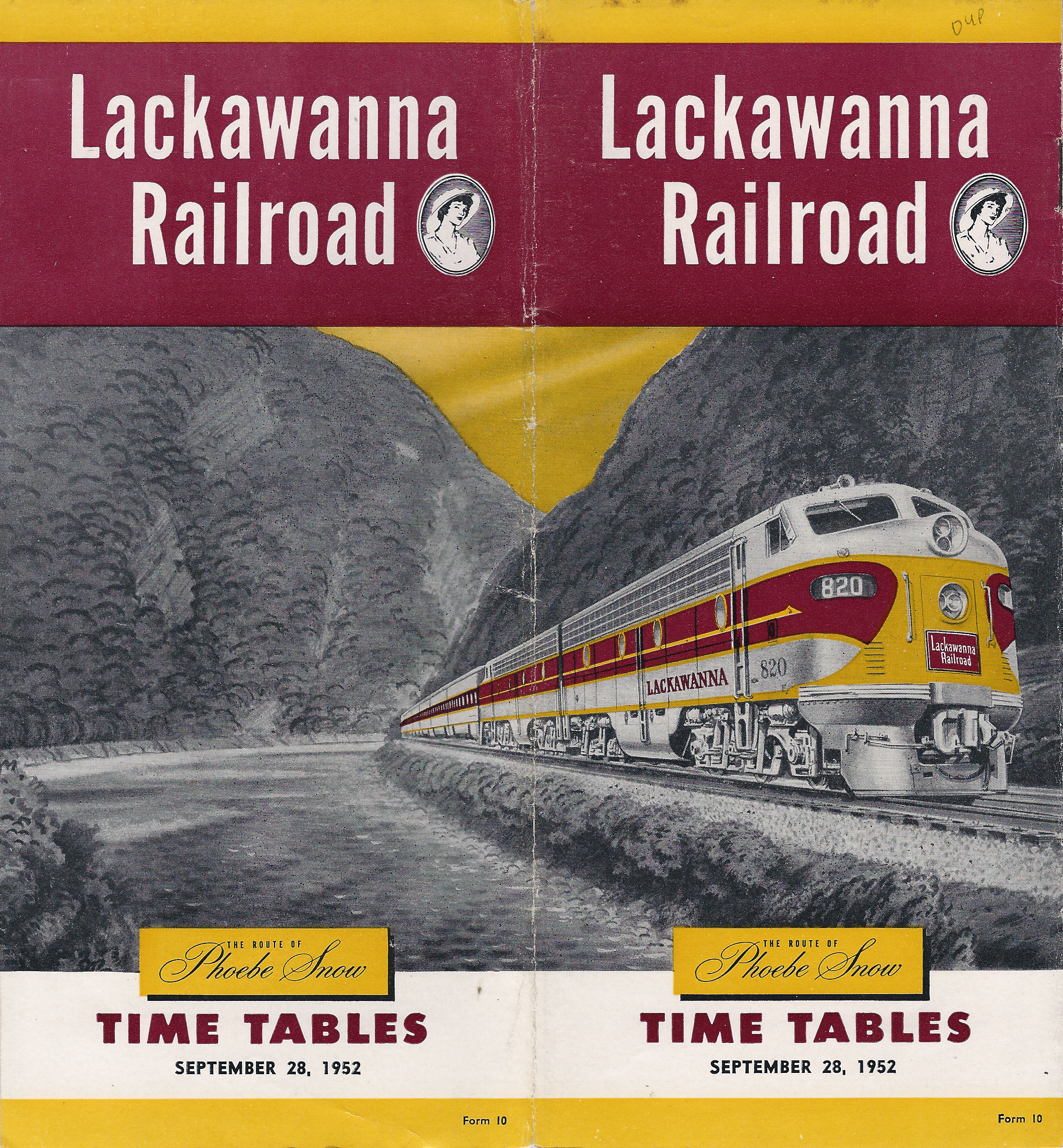
A 1952 timetable showing a streamlined passenger train traveling through the Delaware Water Gap

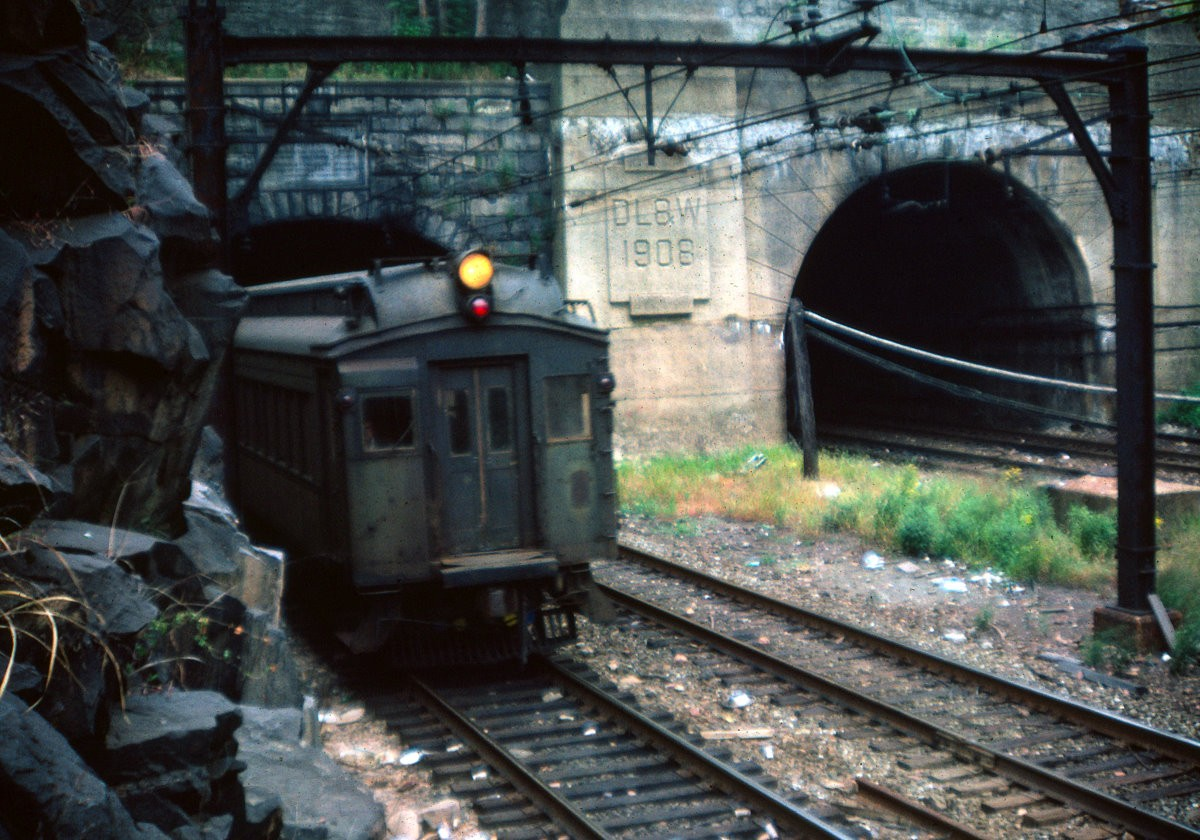
Erie Lackawanna leaving the Bergen Hill Tunnels in 1981

In the wake of Hurricane Diane in 1955, all signs pointed to continued financial decline and eventual bankruptcy for the DL&W. Among other factors, property taxes in New Jersey were a tremendous financial drain on the Lackawanna and other railroads that ran through the state: a situation that would not be remedied for another two decades.

To save his company, Lackawanna president Perry Shoemaker sought a merger with the Nickel Plate Road, a deal that would have created a railroad stretching more than 1,100 miles (1,800 km) from St. Louis, Missouri and Chicago, Illinois to New York City and would have allowed the Lackawanna to retain the 200 miles (320 km) of double-track mainline between Buffalo and Binghamton, New York. The idea had been studied as early as 1920, when William Z. Ripley, a professor of political economics at Harvard University, reported that a merger would have benefited both railroads. Forty years later, however, the Lackawanna was a shadow of its former financial self. Seeing no advantage in an end-to-end merger, Nickel Plate officials also rebuffed attempts by the DL&W, which owned a substantial block of Nickel Plate stock, to place one of its directors on the Nickel Plate board. (The Nickel Plate would later merge with the Norfolk and Western Railroad.)

Shoemaker next turned, in 1956, to aggressive but unsuccessful efforts to obtain joint operating agreements and even potential mergers with the Lehigh Valley Railroad and the Delaware and Hudson Railway.

Finally, Shoemaker sought and won a merger agreement with the Erie Railroad, the DL&W's longtime rival (and closest geographical competitor), forming the Erie Lackawanna Railroad.

The merger was formally consummated on October 17, 1960. Shoemaker drew much criticism for it, and would even second-guess himself after he had retired from railroading. He later claimed to have had a "gentlemen's agreement" with the EL board of directors to take over as president of the new railroad. After he was pushed aside in favor of Erie managers, however, he left in disillusionment and became the president of the Central Railroad of New Jersey in 1962.

Even before the formal merger, growing ties between the Erie and Lackawanna led to the partial abandonment of the Lackawanna's mainline trackage between Binghamton and Buffalo. In 1958, the main line of the DL&W from Binghamton west to near Corning, which closely paralleled the Erie's main line, was abandoned in favor of joint operations, while the Lackawanna Cut-Off in New Jersey was single-tracked in anticipation of the upcoming merger. On the other hand, the Erie's Buffalo, New York and Erie Railroad was dropped from Corning to Livonia in favor of the DL&W's main line. Most passenger service was routed onto the DL&W east of Binghamton, with the DL&W's Hoboken Terminal serving all EL passenger trains. In addition, a short segment of the Boonton Branch by Garret Mountain in Paterson, New Jersey, was sold off to the state of New Jersey to build Interstate 80. Ultimately, the west end of the Boonton Branch was combined with the Erie's Greenwood Lake Branch, while the eastern end was combined with the Erie's main line, which was abandoned through Passaic, New Jersey. Sacrificed was the Boonton Branch, a high-speed freight line thought to be redundant with the Erie's mainline. This would haunt EL management less than a decade later (and Conrail management a decade after that).

Soon after the merger, the new EL management shifted most freight trains to the "Erie side", the former Erie Railroad lines, leaving only a couple of daily freight trains traveling over the Lackawanna side. Passenger train traffic would not be affected, at least not immediately. This traffic pattern would remain in effect for more than ten years—past the discontinuation of passenger service on January 6, 1970—and was completely dependent on the lucrative interchange with the New Haven Railroad at Maybrook, New York. The January 1, 1969 merger of the New Haven Railroad into the Penn Central Railroad changed all this: the New England Gateway was downgraded, and closed on May 8, 1974 by fire damage to the New Haven's Poughkeepsie Bridge, causing dramatic traffic changes for the Lackawanna side. Indeed, as very little on-line freight originated on the Erie side (a route that was more than 20 miles longer than the DL&W route to Binghamton), once the Gateway was closed (eliminating the original justification for shifting traffic to the Erie side) virtually all the EL's freight trains were shifted back to the Lackawanna side. After the New England Gateway closed, EL's management was forced to downgrade the Erie side, and even considered its abandonment west of Port Jervis. In the meantime, the EL was forced to run its long freights over the reconfigured Boonton Line, which east of Mountain View in Wayne, NJ meant running over the Erie's Greenwood Lake Branch, a line that was never intended to carry the level of freight traffic to which the EL would subject it.

In 1972, the Central Railroad of New Jersey abandoned all its operations in Pennsylvania (which by that time were freight-only), causing additional through freights to be run daily between Elizabeth, NJ on the CNJ and Scranton on the EL. The trains, designated as the eastbound SE-98 and the westbound ES-99, travelled via the Lackawanna Cut-Off and were routed via the CNJ's High Bridge Branch. This arrangement ended with the creation of Conrail on April 1, 1976.

During its time, the EL diversified its shipments from the growing Lehigh Valley and also procured a lucrative contract with Chrysler to ship auto components from Mount Pocono, Pennsylvania. The EL also aggressively sought other contracts with suppliers in the area, pioneering what came to be known as intermodal shipping. None of this could compensate for the decline in coal shipments, however, and, as labor costs and taxes rose, the railroad's financial position became increasingly precarious although it was stronger than some railroads in the eastern U.S.

The opening of Interstates I-80, I-380, and I-81 during the early 1970s, which in effect paralleled much of the former Lackawanna mainline east of Binghamton, New York, caused more traffic to be diverted to trucks. This only helped to accelerate the EL's decline. By 1976, it was apparent that the EL was at the end of its tether, and it petitioned to join Conrail: a new regional railroad that was created on April 1, 1976, out of the remnants of seven bankrupt freight railroads in the northeastern U.S.

==== Conrail ====
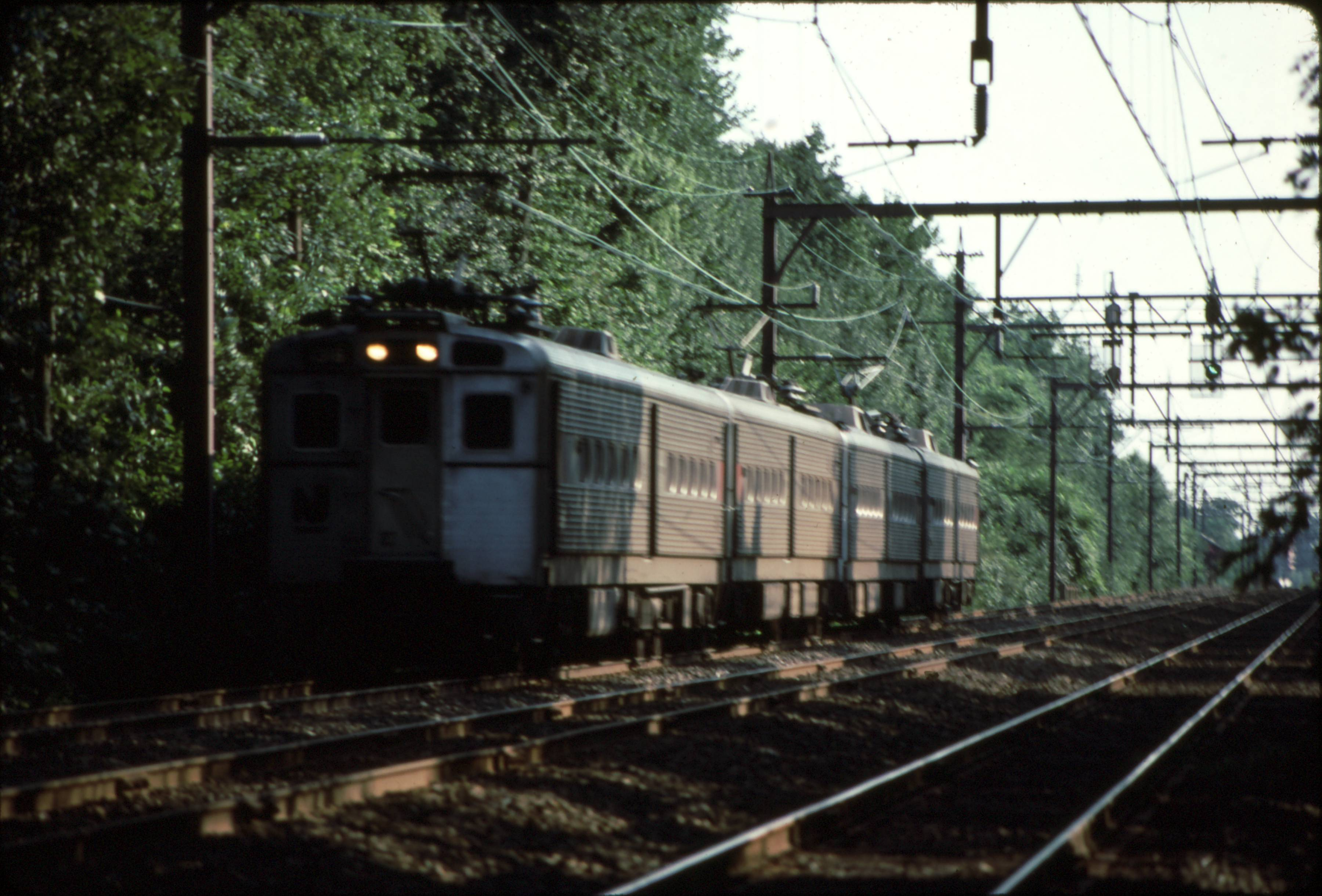
A train on the Morristown Line in South Orange, New Jersey

The EL's rail property was legally conveyed into Conrail on April 1, 1976. Labor contracts limited immediate changes to the freight schedule, but in early 1979, Conrail suspended through freight service on the Lackawanna side. The railroad removed freight traffic from the Hoboken-Binghamton mainline and consolidated the service within its other operating routes. Railroad officials said the primary reasons were the EL's early-1960s severing of the Boonton Branch near Paterson, New Jersey, and the grades over the Pocono Mountains.

The Morristown Line is the only piece of multi-track railroad on the entire 900-mile Lackawanna system that has not been reduced to fewer tracks over the years. It was triple-tracked nearly a century prior, and remains so today.

The Lackawanna Cut-Off was abandoned in 1979 and its rails were removed in 1984. The line between Slateford Junction and Scranton remained in legal limbo for nearly a decade, but was eventually purchased, with a single track left in place. The Lackawanna Cut-Off's right-of-way, on the other hand, was purchased by the state of New Jersey in 2001 from funds approved within a $40 million bond issue in 1989. (A court later set the final price at $21 million, paid to owners Jerry Turco of Kearny, New Jersey and Burton Goldmeier of Hopatcong, New Jersey.) NJ Transit has estimated that it would cost $551 million to restore service to Scranton over the Cut-Off: a price which includes the cost of new trainsets. A 7.3-mile section of the Cut-Off between Port Morris and Andover, New Jersey, which was under construction, was delayed until 2021 due to environmental issues on the Andover station site; the Cut-Off between Port Morris and Andover is slated to re-open for rail passenger service no earlier than 2025.

==== Delaware and Hudson (later Canadian Pacific) ====
In 1979, Conrail sold most of the DL&W in Pennsylvania, with the DL&W main line portion between Scranton and Binghamton (which includes the Nicholson Cutoff) bought by the Delaware and Hudson Railway. The D&H was purchased by the Canadian Pacific Railway in 1991. CPR continued to run this portion of the DL&W main line until 2014, when it sold it to the Norfolk Southern.

==== New York, Susquehanna, and Western ====
The Syracuse and Utica branches north of Binghamton were sold by Conrail to the Delaware Otsego Corp., which operates them as the northern division of the New York, Susquehanna and Western Railway.

==== Norfolk Southern ====
In 1997, Conrail accepted an offer of purchase from CSX Transportation and Norfolk Southern Railway. On June 1, 1999, Norfolk Southern took over many of the Conrail lines in New Jersey, including most of the former DL&W. It also purchased the remnants of the former Bangor & Portland branch in Pennsylvania. Norfolk Southern continues to operate local freights on the lines. In 2014, it purchased the former DL&W main from Taylor, PA to Binghamton, NY from the Canadian Pacific Railway, which it continues to operate to this day.

==== NJ Transit ====
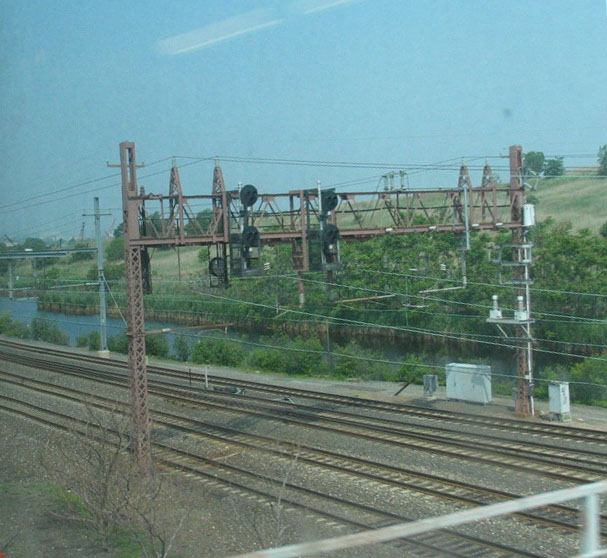
The opening of the Kearny Connection in 1996 provided a direct connection between the railroad's mainline and Amtrak's Northeast Corridor.

NJ Transit Rail Operations took over passenger operations in 1983. The State of New Jersey had subsidized the routes operated by the Erie Lackawanna, and later Conrail. NJ Transit operates over former DL&W trackage on much of the former Morris & Essex Railroad to Gladstone and Hackettstown. In 2002, the transit agency consolidated the Montclair Branch and Boonton Line to create the Montclair-Boonton Line. NJ Transit also operates on the remaining portion (south of Paterson) of the original Boonton Line known as the Main Line. NJ Transit's hub is at Hoboken Terminal.

Trains on the Morristown Line run directly into New York's Pennsylvania Station via the Kearny Connection, opened in 1996. This facilitates part of NJ Transit's popular Midtown Direct service. Formerly, the line ran solely to the DL&W's historic terminal in Hoboken and a transfer to underground rapid transit was required to pass under the Hudson river into Manhattan, or a ferry. This is the only section of former Lackawanna trackage that has more through tracks now than ever before.

==== Pennsylvania Northeast Regional Railroad Authority ====
Since the 1999 breakup of Conrail, the former DL&W main line from Scranton south-east to Slateford in Monroe County has been owned by the Pennsylvania Northeast Regional Railroad Authority (PNRRA). The Delaware-Lackawanna Railroad and Steamtown National Historic Site operates freight trains and tourist trains on this stretch of track, dubbed the Pocono Mainline (or Pocono Main). Under a haulage agreement with Norfolk Southern, the D-L runs unit Canadian grain trains between Scranton and the Harvest States Grain Mill at Pocono Summit, Pennsylvania and wood deliveries to Bestway Enterprises in Cresco. Other commercial customers include Keystone Propane in Tobyhanna. Excursion trains, hauled by visiting Nickel Plate 765 and other locomotives, run from Steamtown to Moscow and Tobyhanna (with infrequent extensions to East Stroudsburg or Delaware Water Gap Station, both on the Pocono Mainline).

The D-L also runs Lackawanna County's tourist trolleys from the Electric City Trolley Museum, under overhead electrified wiring installed on original sections of the Lackawanna and Wyoming Valley Railroad that was also purchased by Lackawanna County. It also runs trains on a remnant of the DL&W Diamond branch in Scranton.

In 2006, the Monroe County and Lackawanna County Railroad Authorities formed the Pennsylvania Northeast Regional Rail Authority to accelerate the resumption of passenger train service between New York City and Scranton.

==== Other remnants ====
===== New York =====
Most of the main line west of Binghamton in New York State has been abandoned, in favor of the Erie's Buffalo line via Hornell. The longest remaining main line sector is Painted Post-Wayland, with shortline service provided by B&H Railroad (Bath & Hammondsport, a division of the Livonia, Avon, and Lakeville Railroad). Shorter main line remnants are Groveland-Greigsville (Genesee & Wyoming) and Lancaster-Depew (Depew, Lancaster & Western). The Richfield Springs branch was scrapped in 1998 after being out of service for years; much of the right of way was purchased in 2009 by Utica, Chenango and Susquehanna Valley LLC of Richfield Springs, New York, which as of 2022 operates a narrow-gauge tourist railway Richfield Springs Scenic Railway on a portion of the line and a walking trail on another section. The Cortland-Cincinnatus Branch, abandoned by Erie Lackawanna in 1960, was partially-rebuilt for an industrial spur about 1999.

===== Pennsylvania =====
As of 2018, the Reading Blue Mountain and Northern operates the former Keyser Valley branch from Scranton to Taylor, as well as the former Bloomsburg branch from Taylor to Coxton Yard in Duryea. The Luzerne and Susquehanna Railway operates the former Bloomsburg branch from Duryea to Kingston. The North Shore Railroad (Pennsylvania) operates the former Bloomsburg branch from Northumberland to Hicks Ferry.

== Gallery ==
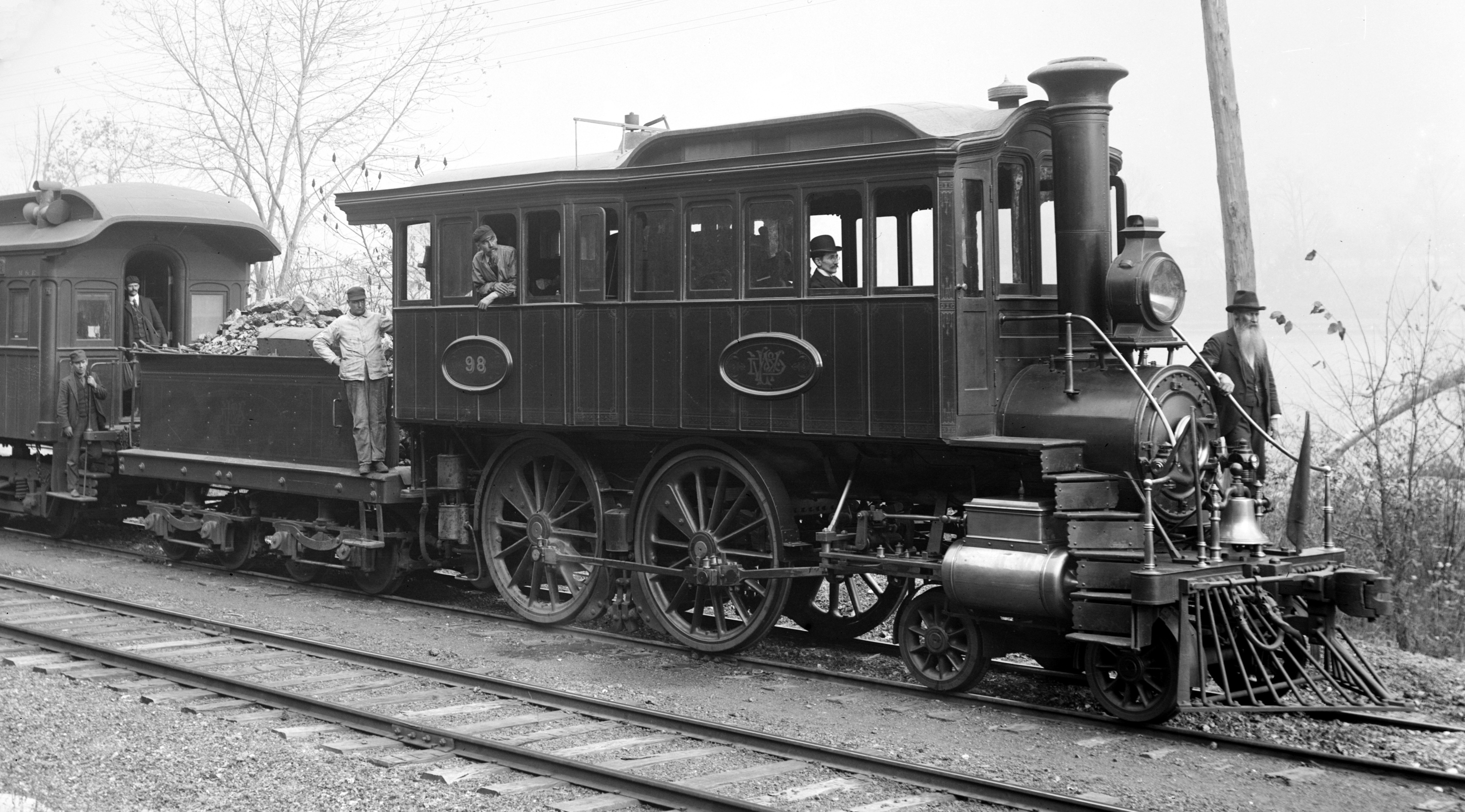
DL&W inspection engine, circa 1900

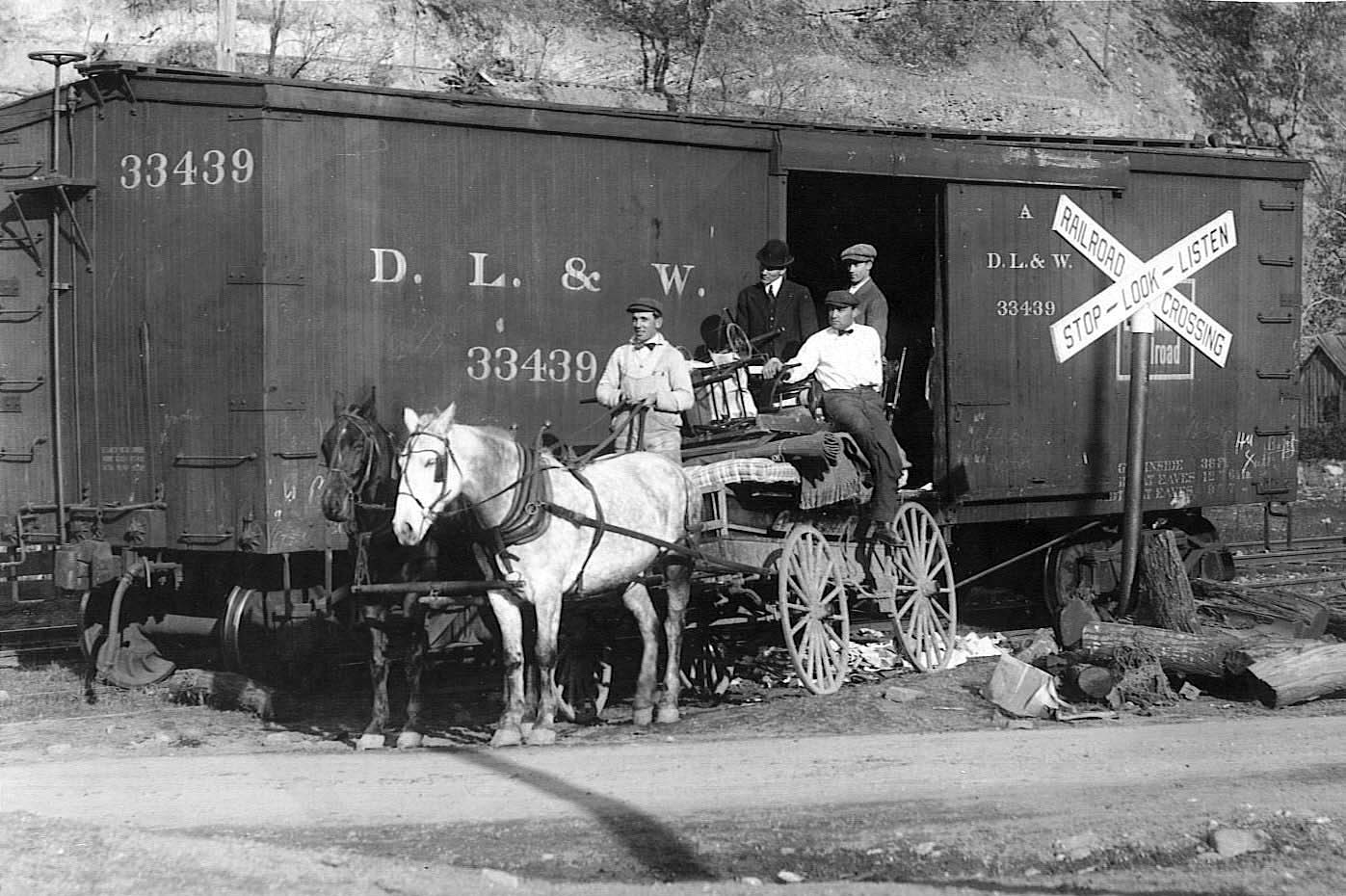
Freight car at a grade crossing, 1900

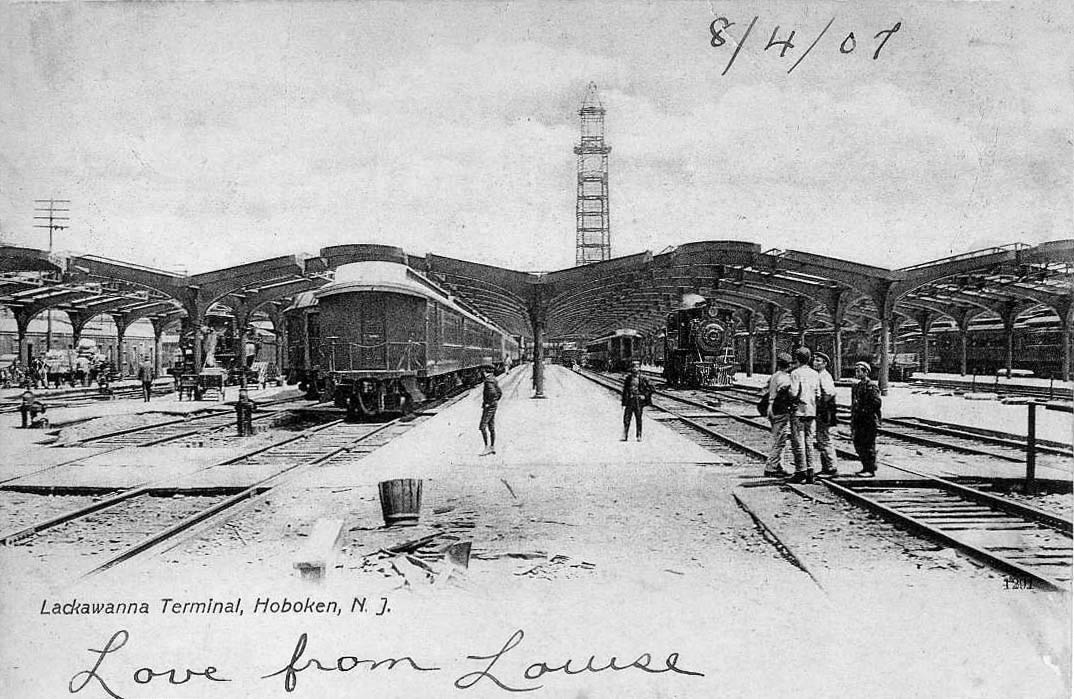
Hoboken Terminal under construction, 1907

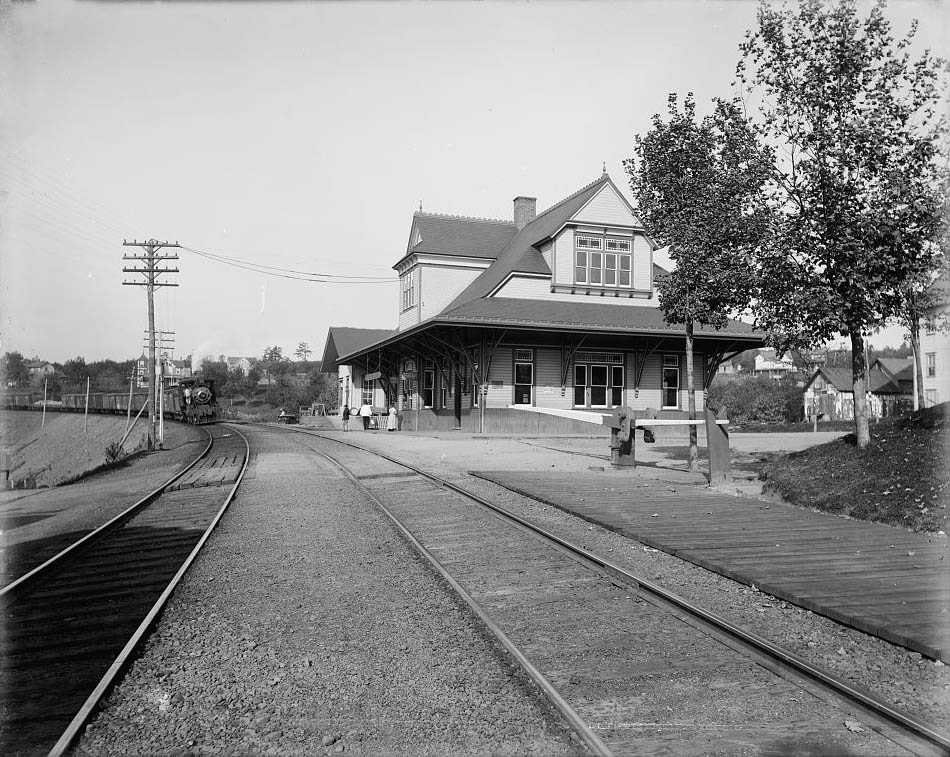
Mount Pocono Station, late 1890s

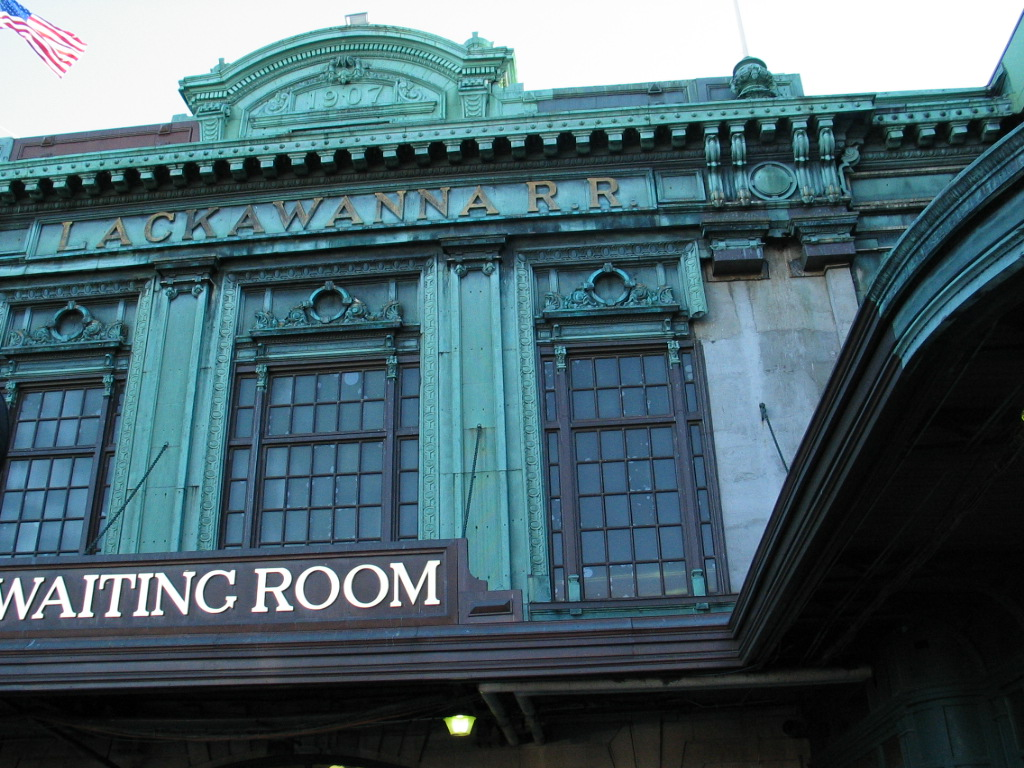
Original Lackawanna R.R. sign at Hoboken Terminal, Hoboken, New Jersey

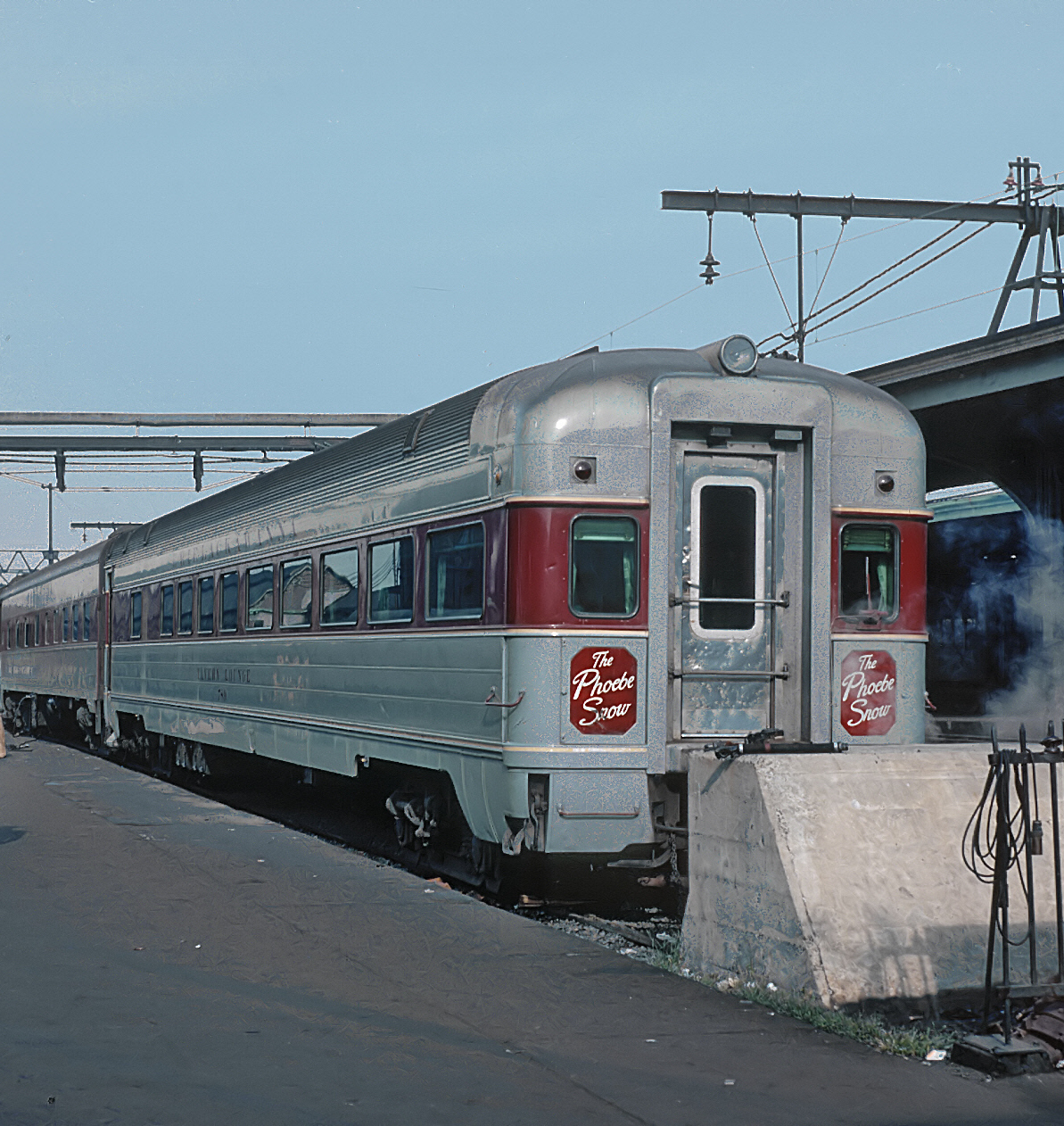
The Phoebe Snow at Hoboken Terminal, 1965

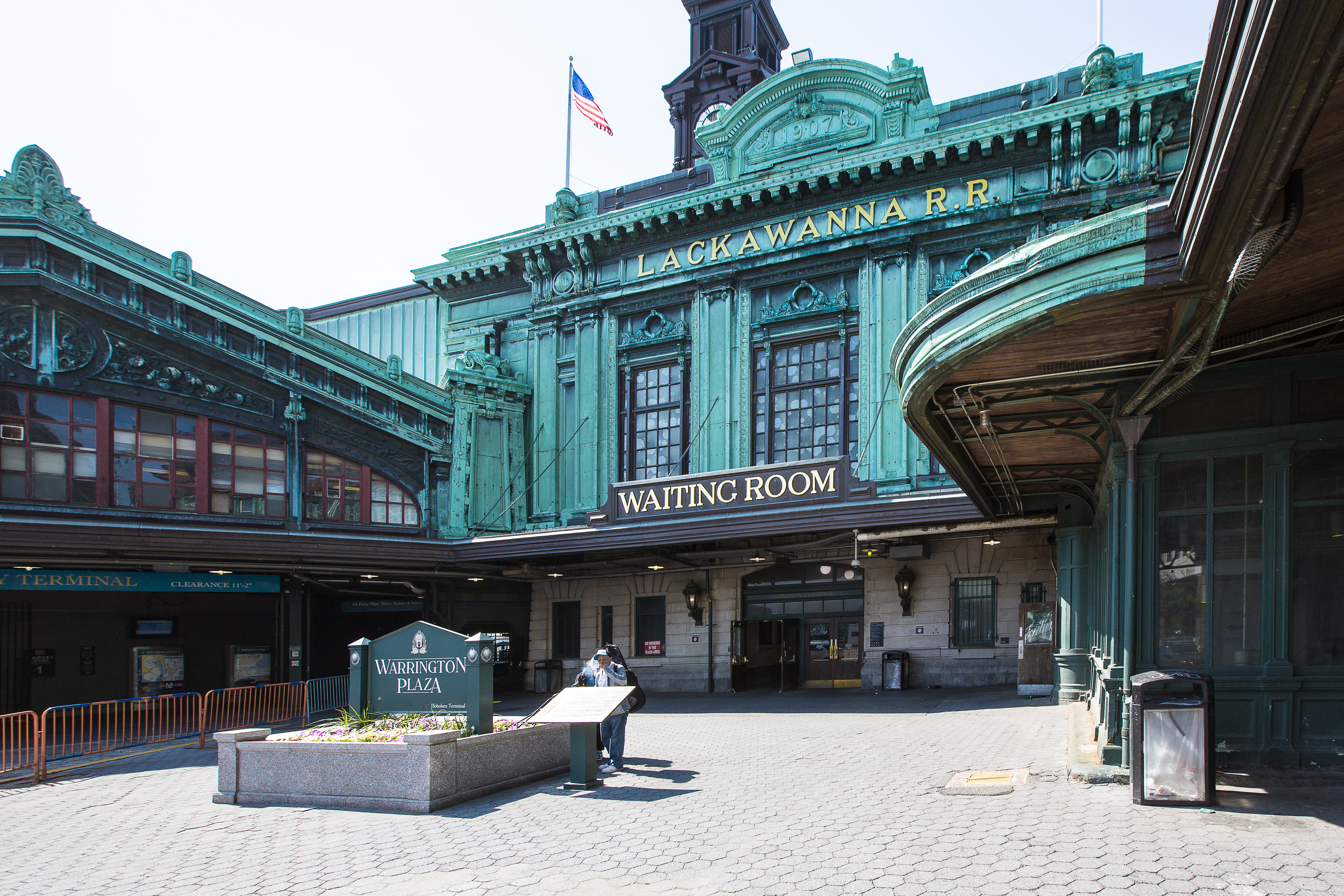
Lackawanna RR terminal building in Hoboken as of 2018

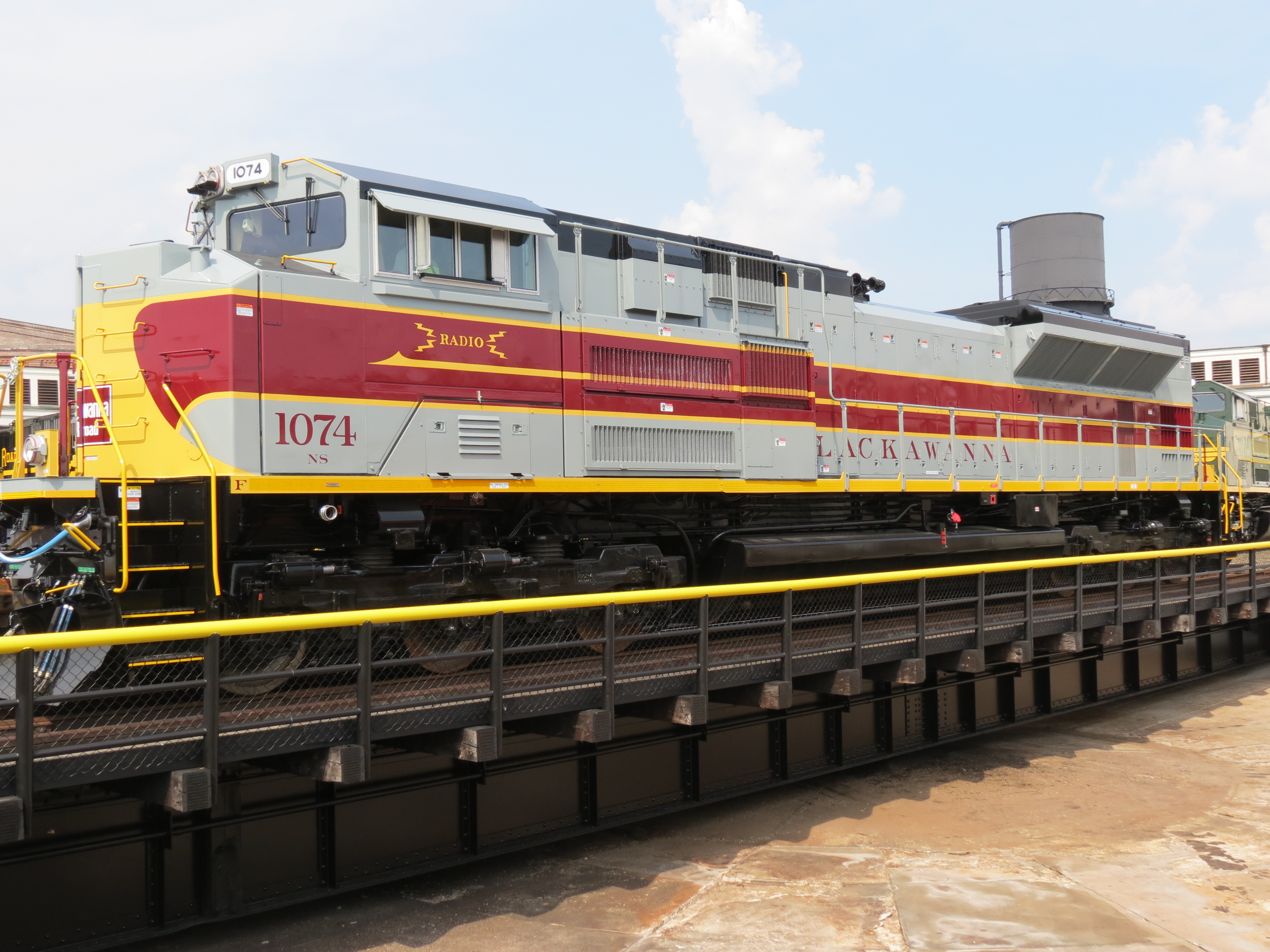
Norfolk Southern NS #1074, an EMD SD70ACe locomotive painted in Lackawanna Railroad livery as part of the NS heritage fleet

== See also ==
- Abraham Burton Cohen
- Boonton Branch
- Lackawanna & Wyoming Valley Railroad
- Sussex Railroad
- Greigsville & Pearl Creek Railroad
- Syracuse & Baldwinsville Railroad
- DL&W 1151 class
