= Silkman =

Silkman may refer to:

- Barry Silkman (born 1952), English footballer
- Silkman House, a historic house located in Pennsylvania, USA
