= Lackawanna County Children's Library =

Historic church in Pennsylvania, United States

- U.S. National Register of Historic Places
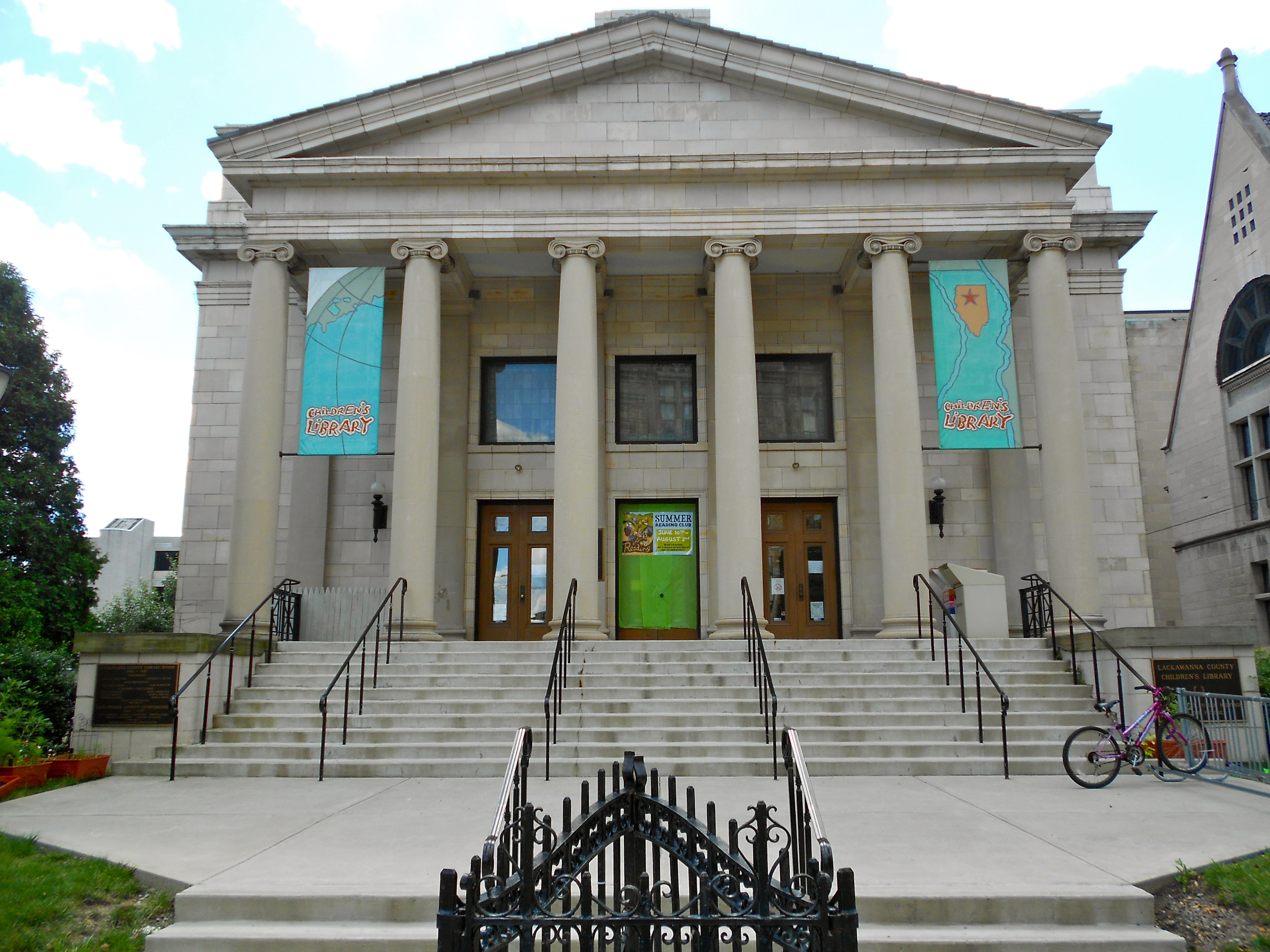
- The former church in 2013

- Location within Pennsylvania Location within the United States
- Location: 520 Vine St., Scranton, Pennsylvania
- Coordinates: 41°24′32″N 75°39′38″W
- Area: 0.3 acres (0.12 ha)
- Built: 1915
- Architect: Albert J. Ward
- Architectural style: Classical Revival
- NRHP reference No.: 88000467
- Added to NRHP: May 9, 1988

The Lackawanna County Children's Library is located in Scranton, Lackawanna County, Pennsylvania, at 520 Vine Street. Built in 1915 as a church, the building is known for its Classical Revival architecture.

== History ==
Established in Boston, Massachusetts by Mary Baker Eddy in 1879, Christian Science would spread to Pennsylvania within ten years. The first major congregation in the state would be formed in Scranton with Judge S. J. Hanna as its pastor. The Hanna family soon moved to Boston, Massachusetts in 1892, where Judge Hanna was to be employed as the editor of the Christian Science Journal. Another notable member of the religion in Scranton was Col. Louis A. Watres, who had served as Lieutenant Governor in Pennsylvania. Hanna and Watres designed and raised the funds to construct Scranton’s own First Church of Christ, Scientist. Designed by Albert J. Ward, the church was constructed from Indiana limestone with stained glass windows decorating the exterior. Wood molding and plaster detailing were highlighted inside of the church. The church formally opened on February 21, 1915.

By 1981, the congregation that attended the First Church of Christ, Scientist had become too small for the church to justify the space they were occupying. The services were moved to a different building on North Washington Ave and the church was put up for sale. Community suggestions for its use ranged from “a museum to a library annex to an art gallery to a performing arts center,” while others wanted “the city to acquire the building for an archive, a place to store the city’s hidden treasures.”

Lackawanna County purchased the former First Church of Christ, Scientist in April 1985 for use as a library. In August 1986, the Lackawanna County Library System received a grant through the Library Development Division of the Pennsylvania Department of Education to remodel the church into a space suitable for a library. When construction began artifacts were discovered in the cornerstone of the building including bibles, a copy of The Christian Science Monitor, and other books. Over the course of the next year, the church was transformed into the Lackawanna County Children’s Library. The building was added to the National Register of Historic Places on May 9, 1988.

== See also ==
- Scranton Public Library
- National Register of Historic Places listings in Lackawanna County, Pennsylvania
- List of former Christian Science churches, societies and buildings
