= Albright Memorial Building =

- Albright Memorial Library
- U.S. National Register of Historic Places
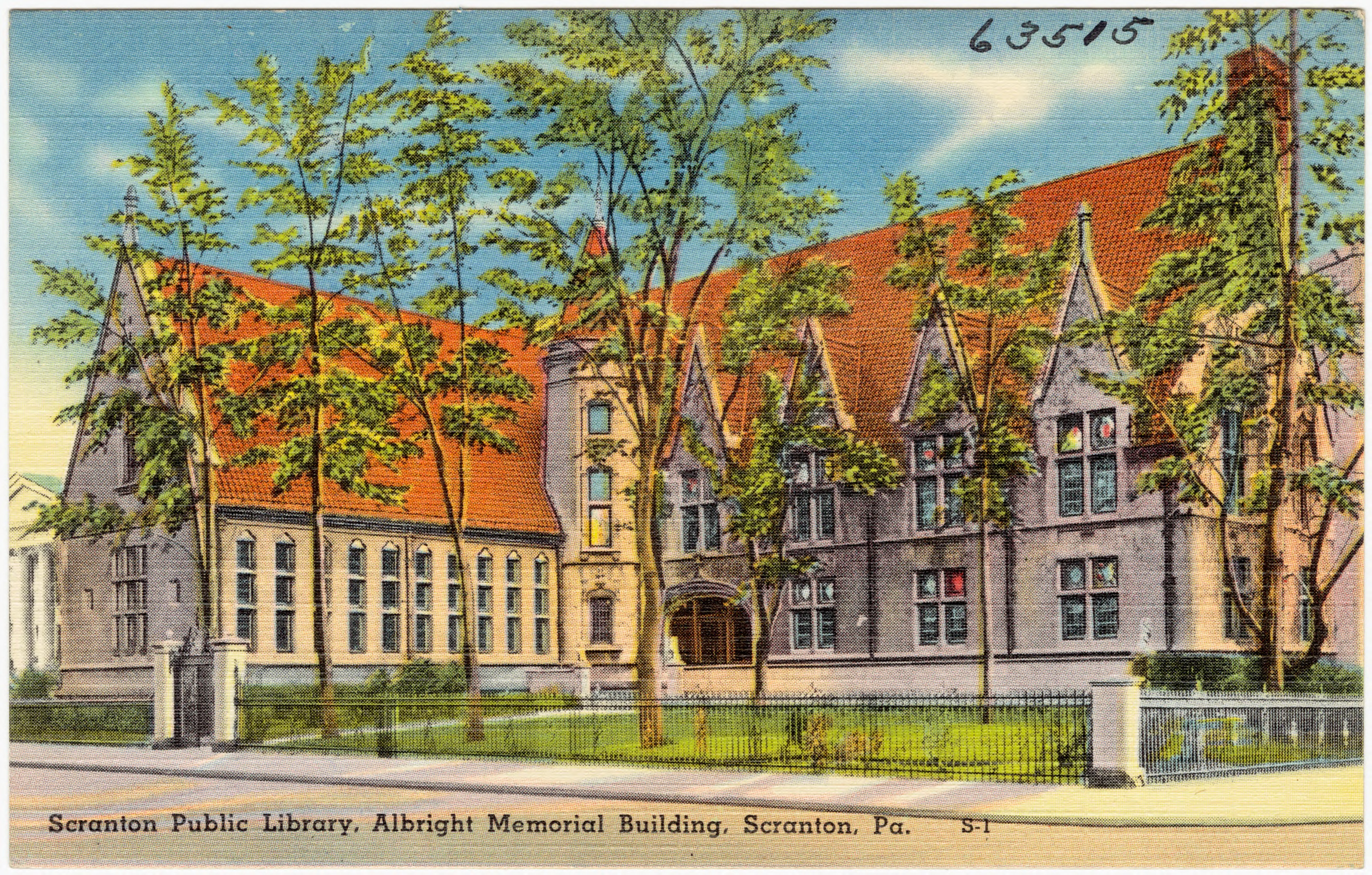
- Library on an old postcard

- Location within Pennsylvania Location within the United States
- Location: 500 Vine St., Scranton, Pennsylvania
- Coordinates: 41°24′39″N 75°39′35″W
- Area: 0.3 acres (0.12 ha)
- Built: c. 1890
- Architect: Green & Wicks
- Architectural style: Renaissance, French Chateau
- NRHP reference No.: 78002411
- Added to NRHP: May 22, 1978

The Albright Memorial Library, also commonly referred to as the Scranton Public Library, is a historic public library located in Scranton, Lackawanna County, Pennsylvania. The library is located on the corner of Vine Street and Washington Avenue. Since the library opened in May 1893, it has served the city of Scranton and the surrounding areas by providing access to books, DVDs, computer services, and more.

== History ==
Joseph J. Albright originally came to the city of Scranton as a general coal sales agent for the Delaware, Lackawanna, and Western Railroad. He would construct a house on the corner of Washington Ave. and Vine St., which he lived in with his wife Elizabeth and their children.

After Joseph and Elizabeth’s deaths, the Albright children reached an agreement with the City of Scranton to donate the land to be used as a library. The original Albright house was demolished in 1890, so the construction of the Albright Memorial Library could begin.

On May 25, 1893, the Scranton Public Library was ready to open two months earlier than originally anticipated. An invite only reception was held that night. During the ceremonies, Harry C. and John Joseph Albright handed over the deed for the ground of the Scranton Public Library to Mayor Connell, who accepted on behalf of the city. The next day, May 26, the library opened to the general public with Henry Carr as the first librarian.

The library collection was originally 10,600 volumes selected by the first librarian Henry Carr. The Scranton Republican reported that this selection covered a “wide range of subjects including works of reference, philosophy, theology, social science, national sciences, useful and fine arts, poetry, drama, essays, fiction, biography travels, history, etc.” By June 15, 1893, over 1500 people had signed up for a library card and continued to grow steadily. Between 200 and 350 books were being checked out daily.

During World War II, the Scranton Public Library participated in the Victory Book Campaign, which encouraged the public to donate gently used or new books to soldiers fighting overseas. Former library director Harold A Wooster was the chairman of the Victory Book Campaign for Lackawanna County in 1942. A direct telephone line for the campaign was even installed in the Albright Memorial Library to help facilitate the donation of books. The library collected the books to prepare them to be shipped to main hubs before being transported to the soldiers. During the 1942 Victory Book Campaign, Lackawanna County collected almost 35,000 books. An additional 6,000 books would be donated during the campaign in 1943.

In April 1985, the Lackawanna County Library System acquired the First Church of Christ, Scientist church located next door to the Albright Memorial Library. The children’s section, which was located on the first floor of the library, would be moved into this building to create the Lackawanna County Children’s Library. The new Children’s Library would open on December 12, 1987.

The Albright Memorial Library has remained open almost continuously from that date in May 1893. Through the years, it has briefly closed during the Spanish Flu Pandemic of 1918 and at various times throughout its history for renovations. On May 22, 1978, the Albright Memorial Building was placed on the National Register of Historic Places. During 2020, the library was completely closed from March through June due to the COVID-19 pandemic It would reopen to the public in mid-June. Today, library services are fully open and available to the public.

== Building Information ==
The Albright Memorial Library was constructed from June 16, 1891 though May 25, 1893. Green and Wicks, an architectural firm from Buffalo, were the architects of the new library, while Conrad Schroeder was responsible for its construction. At the request of John Albright, the exterior of the building was based on the Musee de Cluny, which is located in Paris, France. To achieve this, they used Indiana limestone and Medina stone for exterior and Spanish tiles for the roof. Carvings, including lion statues and owls, decorate the exterior building.

The library’s interior includes intricate oak wood, or similar woods stained to match. The first floor contains three fireplaces made of Italian marble. These seem to be used even though the library was built to be compatible with steam heat and electricity. The first floor contains mosaic Italian marble floors. A notable feature of the second floor are Mycenaean marble pillars that existed surrounding the original overlook into the circulation department. The original railing for this overlook was made of intricate wood designs. During the winter of 1954 through 1955, renovations to the library closed the floor of the reference department. Today, sections of the original railing are displayed on a wall in the Reference Section as decoration.

The grounds of the Albright Memorial Library were originally designed by landscape architect Frederick Law Olmsted. It is designated as Job #1349 under the Olmsted, Olmsted, and Eliot name. The original plans contain a variety of plants and shrubbery. It is unknown if this project was ever completed. If it was completed, it would have been replaced with landscape design adapted to the changing tastes over the course of the early 20th century. The Daughters of the American Revolution donated a dogwood tree, which was planted in the center of the front lawn at the library. In 2001, the gardens were restored to the original Olmsted design using a mix of modern aesthetics and the original plans. This project was funded by an Urban Forestry Grant from the United States Forestry Service. Unfortunately, the landscape surrounding the Albright Memorial Library changed once again due a project to create rainwater cisterns. Today, the area surrounding the Albright Memorial Library is primarily composed of small shrubs, some trees, and flowers.

== Artworks ==
Stained glass windows can be seen in the reference and circulation departments of the Albright Memorial Library. Created by Edwin Ford and Frederick Brooks of Boston, the windows reflect important figures in the history of books through the book bindings they used. Book bindings were designs used to designate a printmaker or owner of a certain work. Ford and Brooks used designs from printers, such as Stephanus Maillet, Sebastian Nivellius, and Melchoir Novesianus, for smaller windows. Designs appearing on books owned by famous patrons of the arts, such as Francis II of France, Queen Elizabeth I, and the arms of Constable Anne de Montmorency, are the basis for statement windows throughout the library.

Four framed paintings are located in public areas at the Albright Memorial Library. The first is a painting of John J. Albright, who is shown seated in a wooden chair with his left hand on the arm of the chair while his head leans on his right hand. Next is a painting of William T. Smith, who was the vice president of the first library board. He is shown seated wearing a black suit and a bowtie. Both of these portraits were done by Theobald Chartran. The final portrait on the second floor of the library depicts Joseph J. Albright, painted by Bayard Henry Tyler. Albright is shown seated while wearing a suit. In the circulation department, a painting by V. Olbert showing three women working on a needle point craft while another woman prepares drinks hangs above a fireplace.

The administrative offices, which occupy the former children’s section of the Albright Memorial Library, contain murals painted by Elizabeth Arthur. Painted between 1933 and 1951, the murals depict scenes from fairytales, classic stories, and images from American History. These include paintings showing Robin Hood, Lassie, the Pony Express, George Washington, and Abraham Lincoln.

== Gallery ==
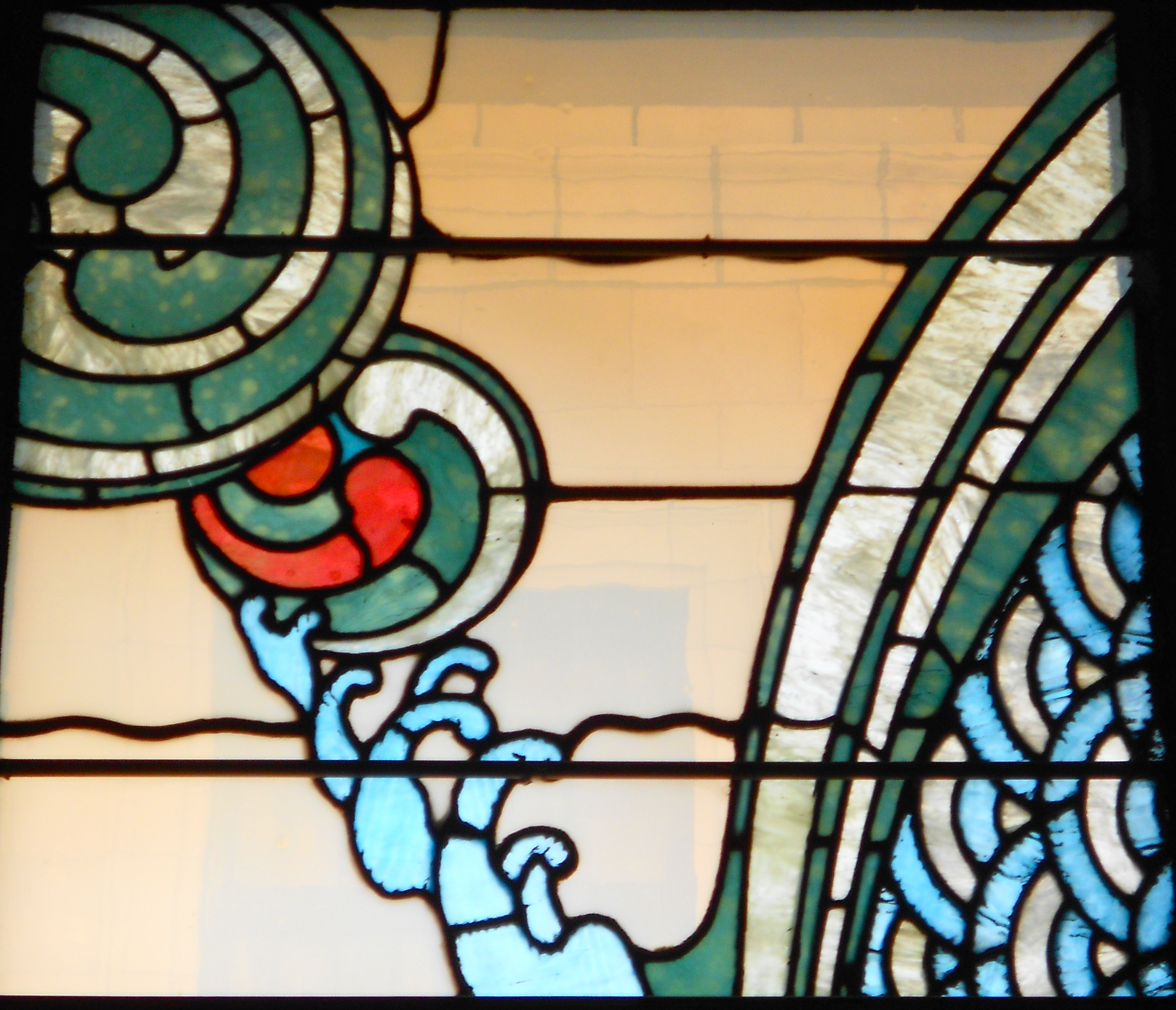
Stained-glass windows

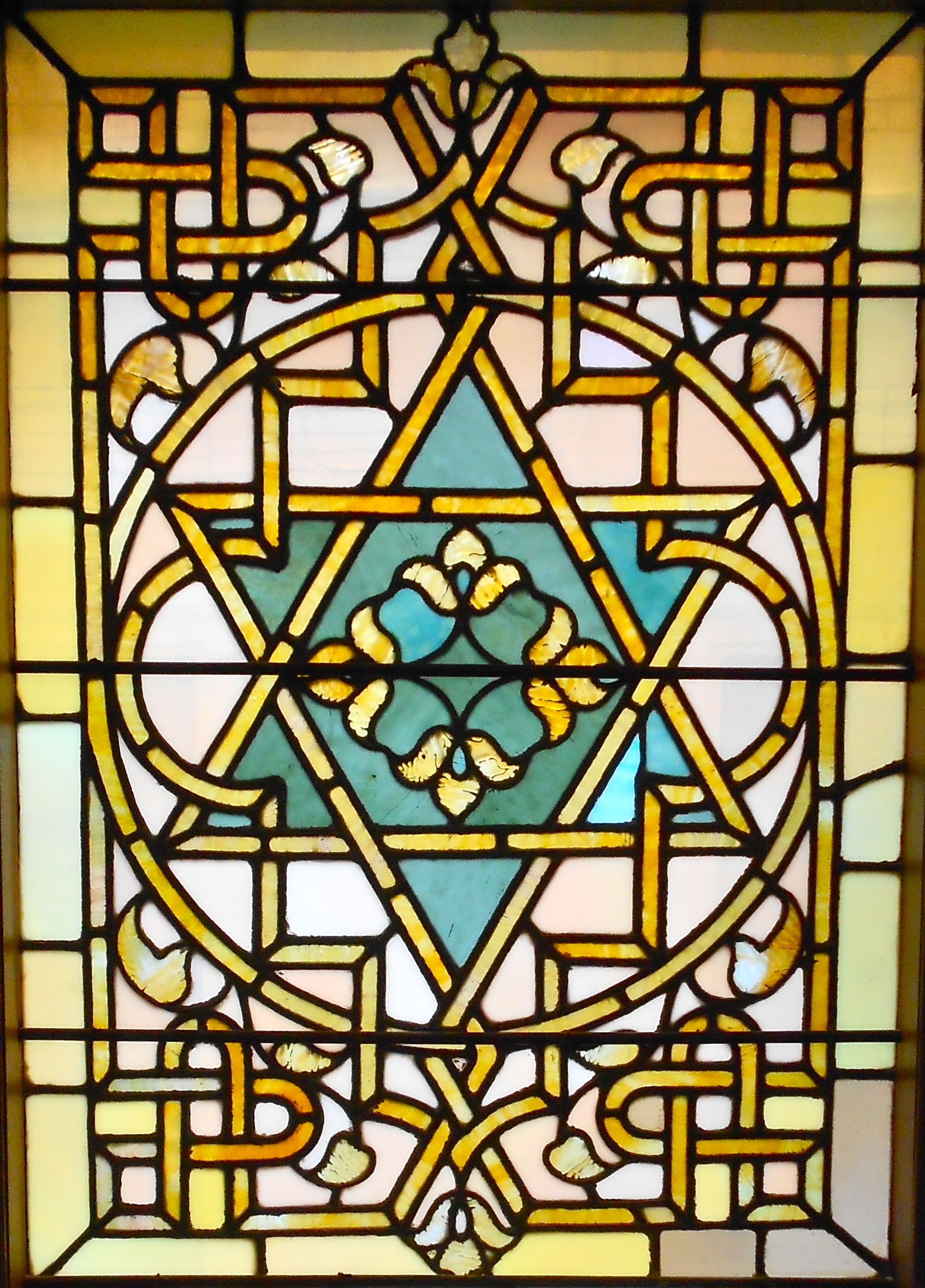

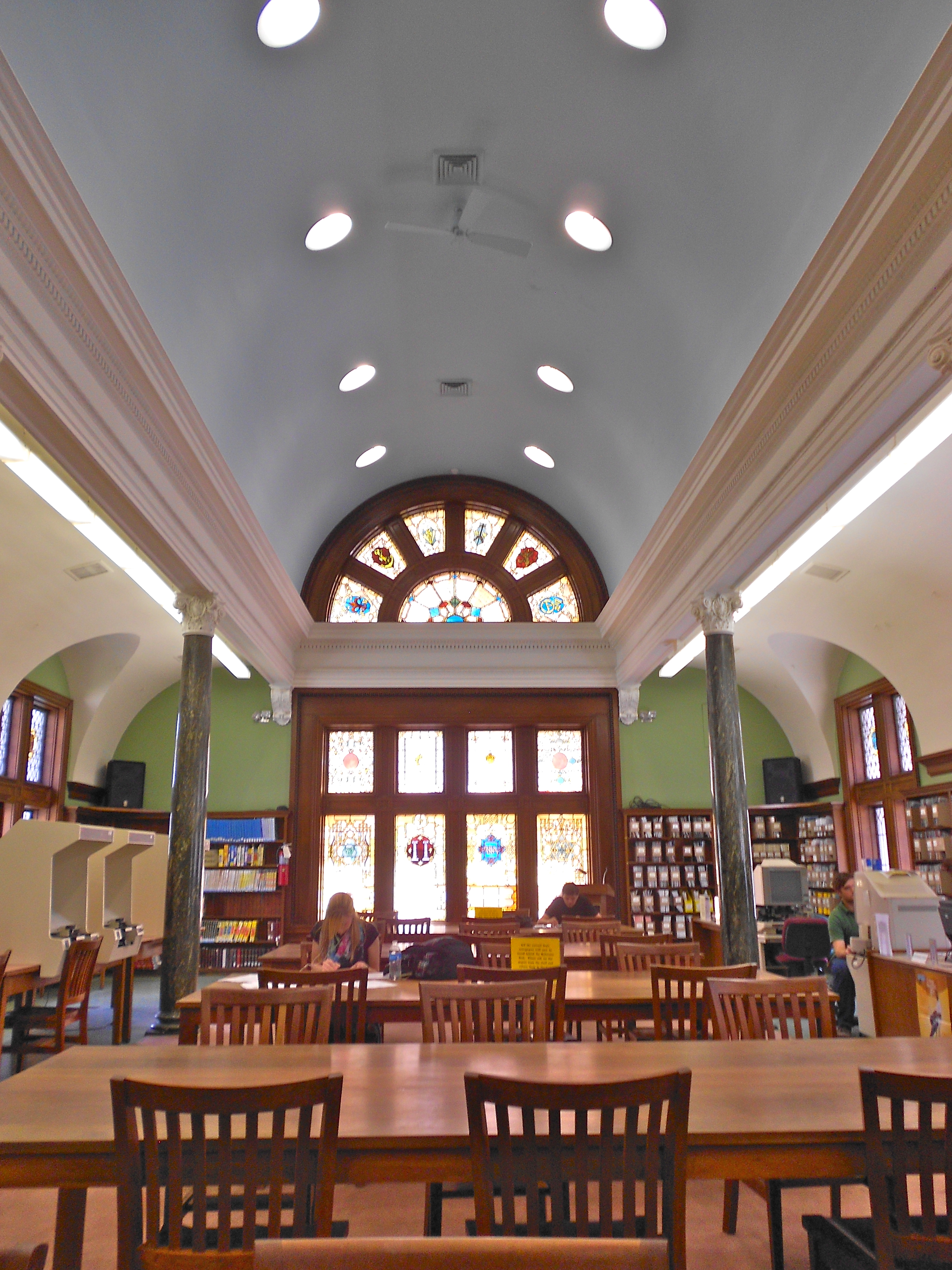
Second floor reading rooms

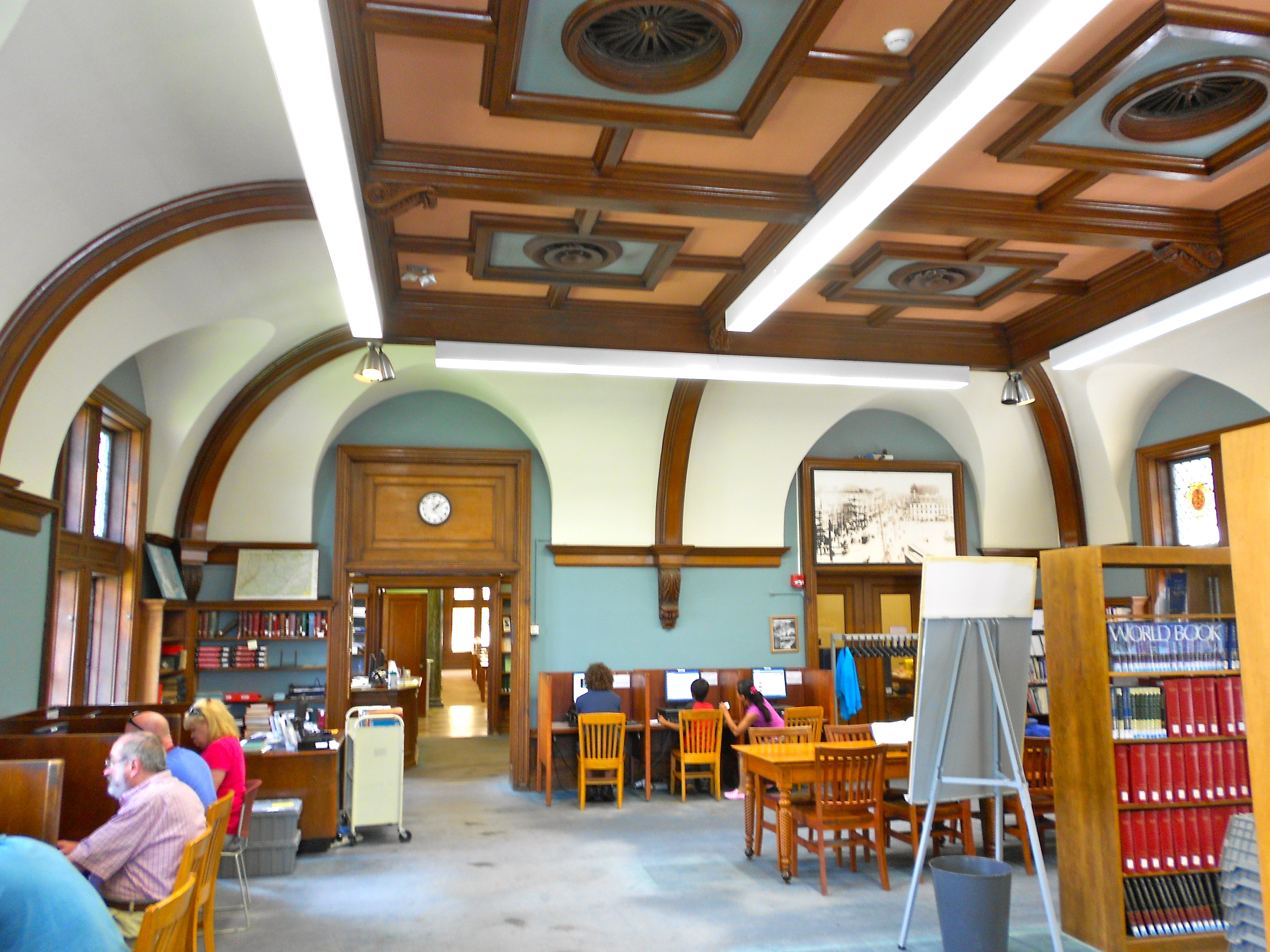

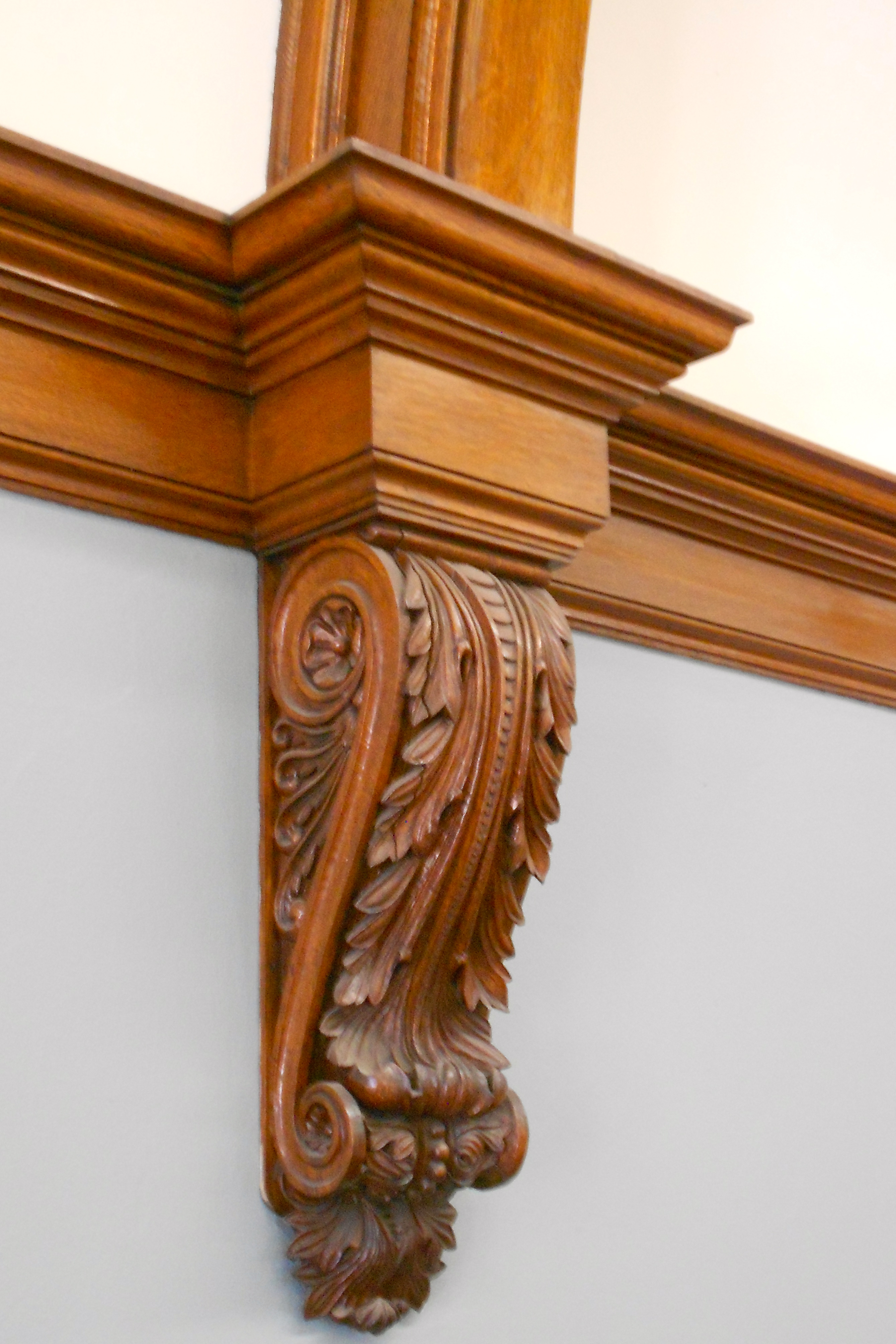
Woodwork

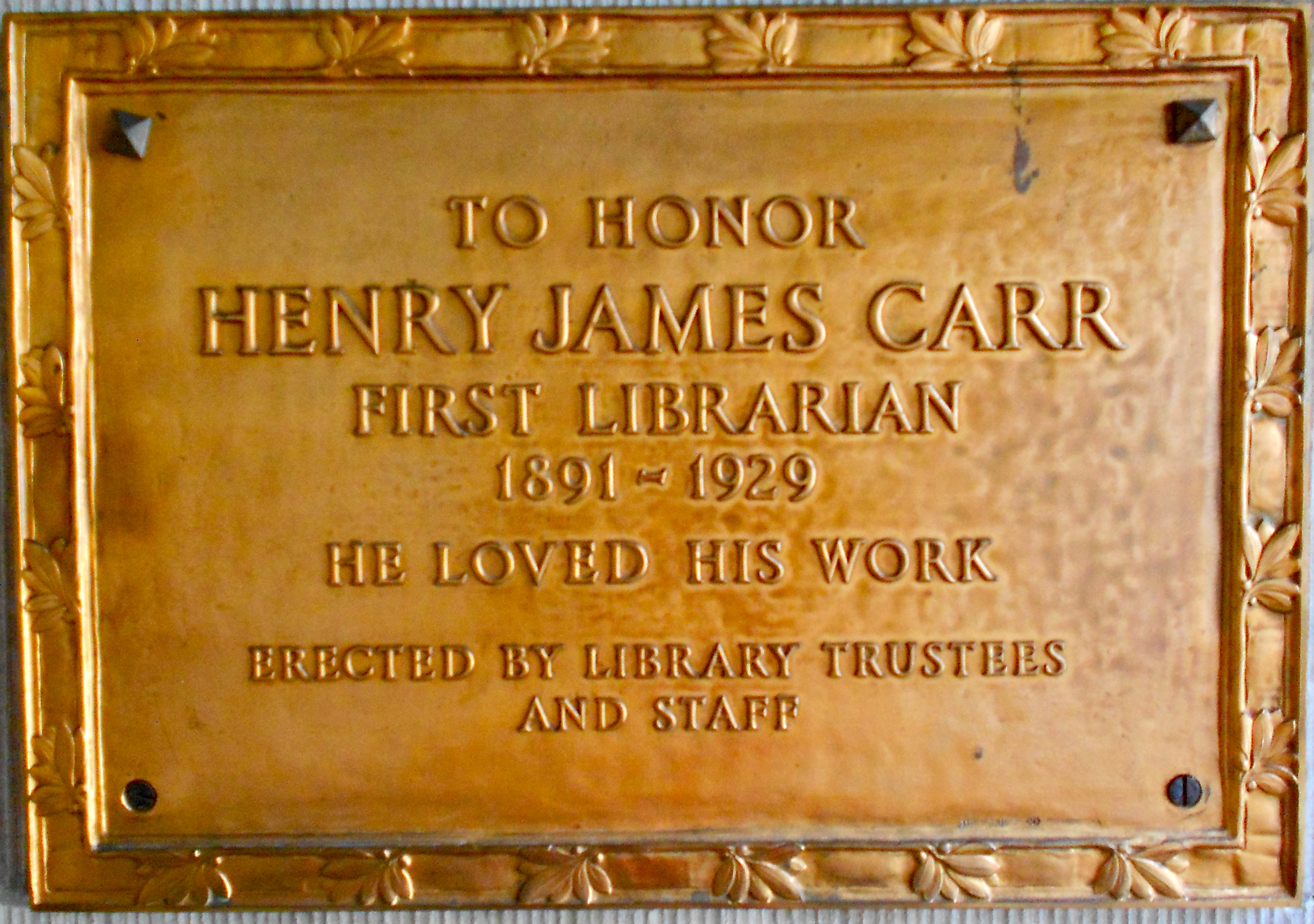
Plaque honoring the first librarian

== Associated Locations ==
- Nancy Kay Holmes Branch Library
- Lackawanna County Children’s Library
- Library Express Bookstore
- Silkman House
