= Silkman House =

Historic house in Pennsylvania, United States

- U.S. National Register of Historic Places
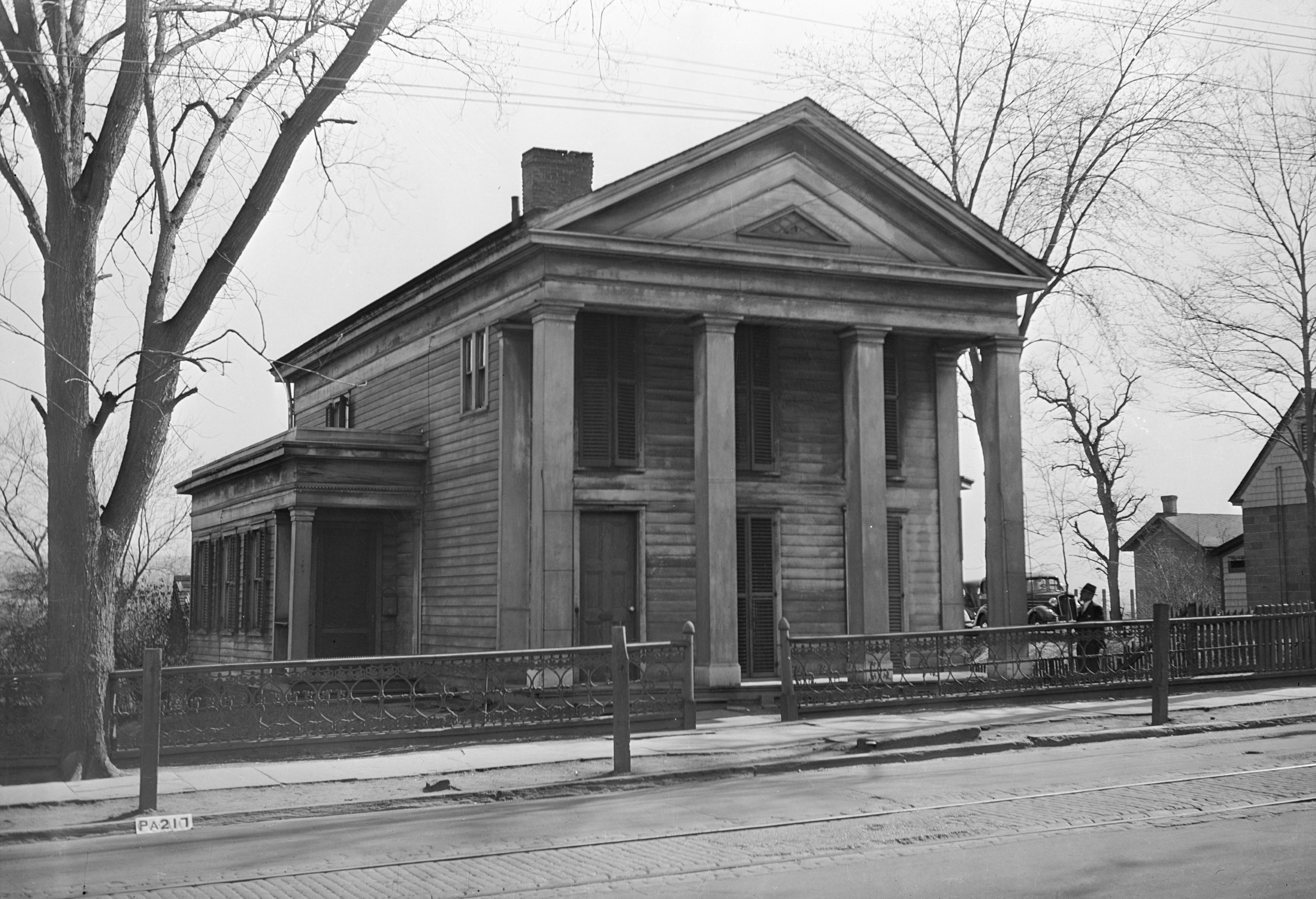
- Silkman House, April 1936

- Location within Pennsylvania Location within the United States
- Location: 2006 N. Main Ave., Scranton, Pennsylvania
- Coordinates: 41°26′17″N 75°39′21″W
- Area: 0.2 acres (0.081 ha)
- Built: 1840
- Architectural style: Greek Revival
- NRHP reference No.: 78002413
- Added to NRHP: December 18, 1978

The Silkman House is located at 2006 Main Ave., Scranton, Lackawanna County, Pennsylvania. Even though it is popularly known as the Providence Branch of the Scranton Public Library, it is currently used as the technical services department of the Lackawanna County Library System and is no longer open to the public.

== History ==
Aaron Burr Silkman constructed the home from trees and wood that originally stood on the property in 1840. As it is still the original structure with only minor renovations, it is considered one of the oldest buildings in the city of Scranton.

Aaron Burr Silkman was descended from John Silkman who arrived from Germany in the 1700s. He would serve in the Revolutionary War. His son, Daniel, would marry Joanna Brundage. She was a descendant of John Winthrop, one of the founding members of the Massachusetts Bay Colony. Daniel's grandchildren, William and Mary, would be some of the first people to live in the Silkman House. Aaron Burr Silkman gave the house to them six years after its construction in 1849. In return Aaron received a farm in Taylor, Pennsylvania. He would live in Scranton for a time before dying in Vineland, New Jersey in 1895.

William and Mary Silkman would raise their family, including a pet parrot, in the house. During renovations items such as hoop skirts, rawhide trunks, handmade barrels, hats, canning supplies, and other family items were discovered. Some of the items, such as an old stove, are still in the house today. The last Silkman to live in the household was Augusta Silkman, who died in 1937. After her death, the property was sold by her heirs to a group of citizens to use the building as a library and cultural center.

On November 1, 1938, the Silkman House was completely restored and set up for use as a branch of the Scranton Public Library. During the ceremonies, remarks were made by Thomas F. Kennedy who represented the Works Progress Administration, Harold A Wooster who was the chief librarian of the Scranton Public Library, and Mayor Fred J. Heuster. It also included a dedication ceremony for the Walter W. Winton Jr. Fountain located inside of the building, and a historical exhibition located on the second floor.

As the a branch of the Scranton Public Library, the Silkman House served the Providence neighborhood of the city of Scranton. It existed until December 2005, when it was closed due to low circulation numbers. At this point the Lackawanna River Corridor Association, an environmental education organization, expanded into the first floor of the building. They had been operating out of the second floor of the Silkman House since 1996 with the Providence Branch Library operating out of the first floor.

On November 10, 2009, the Scranton City Council announced a plan to create the Scranton Public Library Authority that would obtain ownership of the Albright Memorial Library, Green Ridge Branch, and the Silkman House from the city of Scranton. On December 15, 2009, this ordinance would be passed by Scranton City Council by a vote of 3–2 after a public hearing.

The Silkman House began operating as the Tech Services department of the Lackawanna County Library System. It is where books, magazines, DVDs, audiobooks, board games, and more are processed and cataloged for each library in the county. Once this happens, the books are then sent to the libraries of the Lackawanna County Library System to be enjoyed by patrons.

== Building Information ==
The Silkman House was considered an example of true colonial design in the United States, and blueprints of it are located in the National Archives in Washington D. C. Built in 1840, the wooden house is a 2 1/2-story, rectangular frame building in the Neo-Greek Revival style. Originally, the house was surrounded by a wrought iron fence with a grape design. Other exterior features included white painted wooden siding. The columns of the front portico are square rather than the traditional tapered round columns. The interior of the two-story house includes a basement where the kitchen, dining room, and vegetable storage rooms were originally located. The first floor contained living quarters, a pantry, storage areas, and a bedroom, and the second story has the remaining bedrooms and storage areas. Later additions to the home included a nook on the second story and a sun porch.

In 1936, the house was surveyed as part of the Historic American Buildings Survey. As part of this process photographs and floor plans were created. In 1938, renovations funded by the Works Progress Administration with help from consulting architect, Searle H. VonStorch, were completed. The building to opened as the Providence Branch of the Scranton Public Library complete with library stacks and an exhibit space on the second floor in 1938. It was added to the National Register of Historic Places in 1978.
